= Rhythm Methodist =

Studio album by Phil Beer
- Released: 2 May 2005
- Recorded: 2004
- Studio: Riverside Studio
- Genre: Folk
- Length: 57:27
- Label: Hands on Music (2005); Talking Elephant (2008)
- Producer: Phil Beer

Phil Beer chronology
Once in a Blue Moon (2001)	Rhythm Methodist (2005)	Studio (2010)

Rhythm Methodist (typeset as RHYThM METhODIST on the 2005 version) is the fourth studio album by Phil Beer (sixth including the Phil Beer Band studio albums). Recorded at Riverside Studio whilst on a break from Show of Hands, the album is a double album, with disc one, Songs, containing cover versions of songs, whilst disc two, Instrumentals, consists almost entirely of Beer's arrangements of traditional, instrumental pieces. An eclectic array of instruments, influences and guest musicians feature on the album.

It was released in May 2005 by Hands on Music, before an altered re-release occurred in 2008 which features the music on one disc instead of two and a different typeface on the artwork. The album was critically acclaimed, with praise given to Beer's musicianship, skill and singing voice. Due to his return to Show of Hands later in the year, it would take Beer a decade to release a follow-up album, Plays Guitar and Fiddle. Sings a Bit. (2015).

== Background ==
In the early 2000s, Devon-based folk musician Phil Beer formed the Phil Beer Band whilst on hiatus from his successful duo with Steve Knightley, Show of Hands, and recorded two limited edition studio albums with the band, Mandorock and Once in a Blue Moon. However, his priorities with Show of Hands had prevented him from recording a solo album for some time. After Show of Hands were busy recording two separate albums in 2003, The Path and Country Life, and touring in 2004, the duo took a brief break in 2005 which allowed Beer to record a new solo album. Naming the album Rhythm Methodist as a reference to his methodist upbringing, He recorded the album at Riverside Studio, and described it as a "bootleg production" due to its live, low-key sound and release. The original version of the album rendered the album title as RHYThM METhODIST.

== Music ==
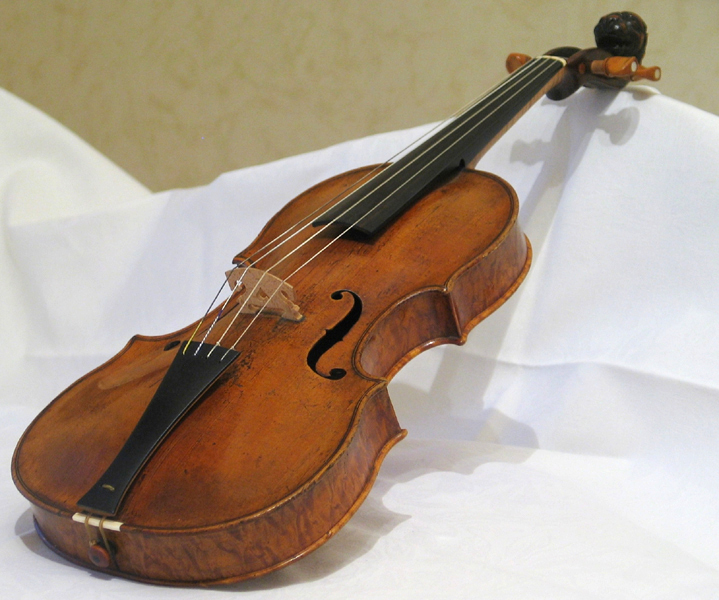
The violin played on the album is a Jacob Stainer model.

Rhythm Methodist is a double album, with the first disc, Songs, containing cover songs and the second disc, Instrumentals, containing instrumentals, all but one of which are traditional. Phil Thomas of The Living Tradition said that, on Songs, Beer "has been let loose with all the 'toys' at his disposal and nobody to gainsay him." Artists covered on the disc include Bob Dylan, Steely Dan and Jackson Browne via Jimmy Cliff. Thomas said that "each song has his individual stamp on it and I reckon these arrangements were a labour of love." The disc opens with his cover of Dylan's "Old Riley", which Beer described as "one of Dylan's 'trad' songs" that was taught to him by Ashley Hutchings. Beer and Hutchings had originally recorded the song together with The Albion Band on their 1990 album.

The idea to cover Jim Webb's "obscure" song "All My Loves Laughter" was originally suggested by Beer's occasional collaborator Chris While to another of his collaborators, Deb Sandland, for her album Semers Water, but Beer liked it and "kept it for himself". Beer had long wanted to record a Steely Dan cover, and "the rain came as if to order" as he covered their song "Fire in the Hole". The fifth track is Gloucestershire poet Frank Mansell's poems, "The Holy Brook", set to music written by Beer's old friend, singer-songwriter Johnny Coppin. His cover of Jimmy Cliff's "Limbo" was the second time he recorded the song, after Show of Hands had recorded it for Out for the Count (1991), although his solo version was described by Beer as being closer to The Neville Brothers' interpretation of the song. The a cappella rendering of Browne's "Our Lady of the Well" as a duet with Deb Sandland, who adds her "dulcet tones". After his cover of the traditional song "Abroad for Pleasure" is Beer's cover of The Band's epic "Acadian Driftwood", described by Thomas as "six minutes or so of real passion."

According to Thomas, disc two, Instrumentals, "has some interesting arrangements of a variety of mostly traditional tunes." Beer plays almost all the instruments on the disc, with cameo appearances from Steve Crickett and Nick Quarmby. The disc opens with "Gloucester Hornpipe/Off to California", the first part of the piece being a tune Beer learnt from Paul Burgess of the Old Swan Band, whilst the second part is a ceilidh standard. "Vive L'Amour/Masters of This Hall", also a traditional piece, is a Breton tune Beer learnt from Johnny Coppin, who himself learnt it from Pierre Bensusan. "Alex Patterson's Return", Beer's only written piece on the album, celebrates Alex Patterson's return from an expedition to the east. "Varso Vienna" is a ceilidh tune whilst "Lizzie's Set" is a jig and a reel featuring, as the title suggests, Lizzie Wescott on fiddle. Beer's version of Linda Thompson's "Telling Me Lies", recorded several years prior to the album at The Patterson Family Farm before being "finally laid to rest" by its inclusion on the album, features rare slide guitar playing from Beer.

"Mampy Moose/Brilliant Pebbles/Philip Brunels" is a live set featuring Gareth Turner on diatonic fiddle; the first two parts of the piece were written and recorded by English reggae/folk band E2, whilst "Philip Brunels" comes from Quebec. The album closes with "Flowers of the Forest/When This Bloody War Is Over", the first part being a traditional tune learnt in Fairport, whilst the second part is a gospel hymn he had learnt to play in a Methodist chapel many years prior. The words of the songs are from the trenches of World War I, and Beer re-recorded the song with Show of Hands for their Centenary of the outbreak of World War I-commemorating album Centenary: Words & Music of the Great War (2014).

== Release ==
Professional ratings
Review scores
Source	Rating
The Living Tradition	(favourable)

Rhythm Methodist was released on 2 May 2005 by independent record label Hands on Music, co-founded by Beer in 1995 for Show of Hands releases. Phil Thomas of The Living Tradition was very positive, saying that "I feel ashamed to admit that I had forgotten that this man has one of the best voices we have in these islands. This release comes as a timely reminder," and that the album contains "terrific musicianship throughout." Beer returned to Show of Hands later in the year, who were releasing their live album As You Were, and in early 2006 the duo recorded their Afro Celt-produced album Witness, released in May of that year.

The album was re-released on 15 December 2008 by Beer's sporadic record label Talking Elephant, who changed the typeface and spacing of the text on the album cover, and put all the music on one disc instead of two. After the album was originally released in 2005, Beer would take some time to release another album; in 2010 he released a box set of older material, Box Set One, before finally releasing his next studio album, Plays Guitar and Fiddle. Sings a Bit. in 2015, ten years after Rhythm Methodist. In 2014, Beer re-recorded "When This Bloody War Is Over" with Show of Hands for their Centenary of the outbreak of World War I-commemorating album Centenary: Words & Music of the Great War (2014).

== Track listing ==
=== Disc one ===
1. "Oid Riley" - 3:47
2. "All My Loves Laughter"
3. "Fire in the Hole" - 3:39
4. "The Holy Brook" - 3:09
5. "Limbo" - 5:20
6. "Our Lady of the Well" - 3:30
7. "Abroad for Pleasure" - 3:29
8. "Acadian Driftwood" - 6:07

=== Disc two ===
1. "Gloucester Hornpipe/Off to California"
2. "Vive I'Amour/Masters of ThisHall" - 3:40
3. "Alex Patterson's Return" - 2:59
4. "Varso Vianna" - 2:47
5. "Lizzies Set" - 3:27
6. "Telling Me Lies" - 5:26
7. "Mampy Moose/Brilliant Pebbles/Philip Brunels" - 3:38
8. "Flowers of the Forest/When This Bloody War Is Over" - 6:49
