= Show of Hands (1987 album) =

Studio album by Show of Hands
- Released: 1987
- Recorded: January 1987
- Studio: Catsley Home, Dorset
- Genre: Folk; English folk
- Label: Self-released
- Producer: Show of Hands

Show of Hands chronology
Show of Hands (1987)	Tall Ships (1990)

Show of Hands is the debut album by English folk duo Show of Hands. The duo formed when Phil Beer took a break from folk rock band The Albion Band, requesting to Steve Knightley that they record a cassette together in Knightley's garage. Knightley, who had recently returned to the duo's native Devon after departing London, agreed, and the duo recorded the album together in January 1987 in Catsley Home, described by Knightley as an outbuilding in the remotest part of Dorset. The album contains twelve compositions, mostly songs by Knightley.

The duo self-released the album in early 1987 on cassette only. It was recorded and released to coincide with their first tour, and was only sold from the duo's concerts. The duo halted their time together as Beer returned The Albion Band, but returned in 1990 with Tall Ships, an album centered on its title track which is a twenty-two-minute adaption of the much shorter song that opens Show of Hands. Both albums, along with Out for the Count (1991), were out of print by 1995, so the duo released the compilation Backlog 1987–1991 (1995) to compile highlights from the three albums. Six songs from Show of Hands feature on the compilation.

== Background and recording ==
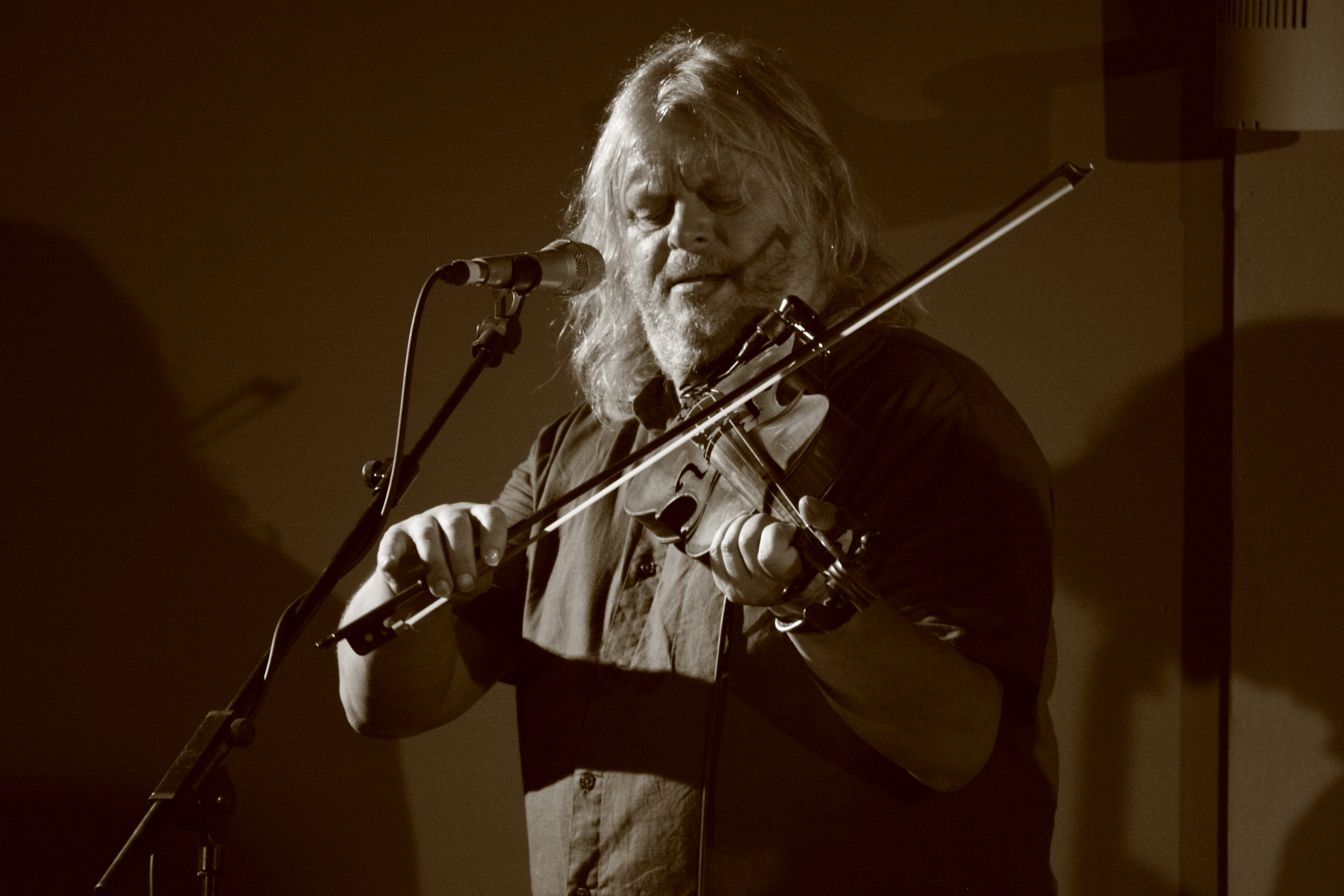
Show of Hands formed when Phil Beer took a break from The Albion Band in 1986–87.

In the early 1980s, Devonian-based folk musicians Steve Knightley and Phil Beer, who had been friends since 1972, briefly joined Paul Downes' band Arizona Smoke Revue. The band was not the duo's first collaboration or with Downes. Beer and Downes had a career together as a duo in the 1970s, releasing albums such as Life Ain't Worth Living (in the Old-Fashioned Way) (1973) and Dance Without Music (1976), whilst Knightley contributed to the duo's live album Live in Concept (1980). Beer was also occasionally play live in Knightley's pub rock bands of the 1980s, Short Stories, The Cheats and Total Strangers, when members of those bands could not appear. However, Beer had joined The Albion Band in 1983, which became his musical priority. Meanwhile, Knightley, who had been living in London for some time, moved back to his native Devon in 1986.

Beer briefly left The Albion Band but returned to them after a hiatus. Regardless, when the band were on a temporary break, he asked Knightley if they wanted to work together as a duo. Knightley recalled that Beer told him "let's go out as a duo: I’ll get some folk club dates and we'll make a little cassette in your back room in Dorset, in the garage." Knightley had been earning Performing Rights Society income from his work on Night Rider, so using money from the income, the duo created a small studio in Catsley Home, described by Knightley as "an outbuilding in the remotest part of Dorset", and recorded the cassette there in January 1987. It was recorded and released to coincide with their first tour.

The album displays twelve compositions, mostly consisting of songs by Knightley. The opening song, "Tall Ships", is a four-minute version of the song that the duo would later adapt into a 22-minute opus for their following album, Tall Ships (1990). The fifth song, "Exile", would later become a live concert staple for the duo, and they have re-recorded it several times, including for their fifth album Lie of the Land (1995) and their compilation Roots: The Best of Show of Hands (2007), as well as on numerous live albums. Some of the songs display a slight folk pop touch, including "See My Baby", which was later re-titled "See My Baby Again".

== Release ==
After the album was recorded in January 1987, the duo held live concerts throughout the rest of the year. Knightley recalled the duo played "25 gigs a year on the folk scene to audiences of twenty people – seventy sometimes, if we were lucky. But it was low key." The album was only sold on cassette at the duo's live performances from early 1987. It was released to coincide with the tour. Being a low-key release, it was not reviewed by any local publications. The touring, nonetheless, gave the duo a small following.

It would be three years until the duo could record a follow-up release, due to Beer's commitments to The Albion Band. The duo eventually recorded another cassette release, Tall Ships, in 1990. The album was centered on an expanded song suite adapted from the first song on Show of Hands. Beer left The Albion Band in 1990, allowing the duo to become a full-time partnership. They recorded a final cassette album, Out for the Count (1991), before they looked "for more work", eventually leading to their first CD release, Show of Hands Live (1992).

By 1995, at which point the duo had become much more successful, Show of Hands, as well as their other two cassette albums, had long since been out of print and were unavailable. Thus, the duo created the compilation album Backlog 1987–1995 (1995) for CD release on their own label Hands on Music. The compilation features what the duo consider to be the highlights of the three cassettes, so that those songs were not unavailable to fans. Six tracks from Show of Hands appear on the compilation, namely "Ah So!", "Solo", "The Last Picture Show", "Homes for Heroes", "See My Baby Again" and "Friends". "Last Picture Show" also featured on Beer's box set release Box Set One (2010), which compiles various rarities from throughout Beer's career.

== Track listing ==
1. "Tall Ships"
2. "Friends"
3. "Last Picture Show"
4. "Ah So"
5. "Exile"
6. "Show of Hands"
7. "Number One"
8. "Homes For Heroes"
9. "I Still Wait"
10. "See My Baby"
11. "Solo"
12. "Sit You Down"

== Song information ==
- "Tall Ships" is a much shorter version than the 22 minute version found on Tall Ships.
- "Last Picture Show" also features on Phil Beer's Box Set One in 2010.
- "Exile", one of the band's more popular songs, was re-recorded for their fifth studio album Lie of the Land and for the new re-recordings on 2007's Roots - The Very Best of Show of Hands.
- "See My Baby" is retitled "See My Baby Again" on Backlog 1987-1991.
