= Yuletracks =

Studio album by multiple artists
- Released: 1986 (vinyl); 2011 (CD)
- Recorded: September 1985 – March 1986
- Genres: Christmas; folk
- Labels: Greenwich Village Records GVR 235 (LP, UK, 1986); Greenwich Village Records GVRCD 235 (CD, UK, 2011)
- Producers: Joe Stead, Martyn Wyndham-Read

Phil Beer chronology
Live in Concept (1980)	Yuletracks (1986)	Show of Hands (1987)

Yuletracks is a studio album released in 1986. A folk music/Christmas music project by Greenwich Village Records, various artists appear on the album, led by Martyn Wyndham-Read (who also was co-producer of the album) and Martin Carthy. Though not all of the albums' artists appear on every track, every artist appears on more than one track. It was recorded in September 1985 to March 1986. It got a re-release on CD in 2011 (its 1986 release was vinyl only). Brian Snelling engineered the album, with George Peckham cutting the album at Portland Studios. Chris Groom was responsible for the albums' artwork and cover.

Almost everyone on the album was in, or has worked with, the Albion Band.

== Track listing ==
1. "O'Little Town of Bethlehem" - 3:16
  - Martyn: Vocals
  - John: Accordion and vocals
  - Martin: Guitar, vocals
  - Sue: Dulcimer, Vocals
2. "Rose of Sharon" - 2:54
  - Martyn: Vocals
  - Maggie: Vocals
  - Martin: Guitars
  - John: Melodeon
3. "On Christmas Night" - 1:36
  - Martyn: Vocals
  - Maggie: Vocals
  - Martin: Guitars, Vocals
  - John: Concertina, Vocals
4. "God Rest Ye Merry Gentleman" - 4:08
  - Martyn: Vocals
  - Maggie: Vocals
  - Martin: Guitars
  - Sue: Dulcimer
5. "Away in a Manager" - 2:49
  - John: Concertina
  - Maggie: Vocals
  - Martin: Guitars
  - Sue: Vocals
6. "We Three Kings" - 3:12
  - Martyn, John and Martin: Vocals
  - John: Accordion
  - Martyn: Guitar
7. "Good King of Wenceslas" - 3:34
  - Martyn: Vocals
  - John: Accordion
  - Martin: Guitars
  - Phil: Fiddle
8. "I Saw Three Ships" - 1:54
  - Maggie: Vocals
  - Martin: Guitars
  - Sue: Vocals, Dulcimer
9. "In the Bleak Midwinter" - 3:10
  - John: Vocal, Concertina
  - Martin: Guitar
10. "Once In Royal David's City" - 4:29
  - Martyn: Vocals
  - Martin: Guitar
  - John: Concertina
  - Phil: Fiddle
11. "Hark, The Herald Angels Sing" - 2:42
  - Martyn: Vocals
  - Martin: Guitar, Vocals
  - John: Melodeon, Concertina, Vocals
  - Maggie: Vocals
  - Phil: Fiddle

With 6 songs on side one and the remaining 5 on side two on the vinyl, the back cover of the CD version maintains the "side one" and "side two" column titles on the back cover, despite the CD being a single sided disc containing the material from both sides.
