= Mandoline (album) =

Studio album by Phil Beer
- Released: 1978/1979
- Genre: Folk
- Label: Greenwich Village

Phil Beer chronology
Dance Without Music (1976)	Mandoline (1978)	Hard Hats (1994)

Mandoline is the debut album by Phil Beer, released in 1978/1979 on Greenwich Village Records. It follows 1976's Dance Without Music, the second album he recorded with Paul Downes. As the title of this album suggests, a theme on the album is the mandolin, an instrument Beer has used in almost all of his work.

The album is scarce. It is unknown how many copies were pressed, but it has never been reissued.

== Track listing ==
1. "Stanleys Favourite / The Brighton"
2. "Dan Tucker / Soldiers Joy"
3. "Two Reels"
4. "Green Rag"
5. "Buddy Can You Spare a Dime"
6. "Joes Hornpipe / Poppy Leaf"
7. "Good King Arthurs Days"
8. "Morning Sky"
9. "Slip Jigs"
10. "Three Pretty Maids"
11. "Jigs"
12. "Up to the Rigs"
13. "Jigs"
14. "Banks of the Barn"

The two tracks entitled "Jigs" are different.
