= Roots: The Best of Show of Hands =

Roots

Greatest hits album by Show of Hands
- Released: 19 November 2007
- Recorded: 1990–2007
- Genre: Folk; English folk; world
- Length: 152:49
- Label: Hands on Music
- Producer: Various; Show of Hands

Show of Hands chronology
Witness (2006)	Roots (2007)	Live at Exeter Phoenix (2008)

Roots, subtitled The Best of Show of Hands is a "best-of"/"greatest hits" album by British folk duo Show of Hands released in 2007, the year of their 20th anniversary as an official collaboration (prior to 1987 they had collaborated several times without the name Show of Hands).

The album has two discs designed to be the best of the band's career. Short Stories (disc one) features some of the band's most popular songs whilst Longdogs (disc two) aimed to feature one track from each of their albums voted for in a poll on the duo's forum Longdogs.

The album received positive reviews such as in Living Tradition, and Spiral Earth.

fRoots reported that the album charted at number 22 in the "Amazon.co.uk Folk/Roots/World 30" in November 2015, described by the magazine as the "non-budget price CD sales from Amazon.co.uk" for folk, roots and world albums from that month.

== Background ==
A previous best-of album, entitled Show of Hands, was released in 2000 by Track Records. This album was also a double album featuring recordings of 25 of their tracks recorded during a soundtrack in 1999, some previously released on Anglicana. Comparing Roots and Show of Hands, they feature almost entirely different songs than each other, and all different versions of those the same.

Some of the song were re-recorded for this album and a lot of the tracks were recorded live (see Inclusion section.) Despite being a best of album, some of the songs also segued into the next, ala Echoes: The Best of Pink Floyd. "Roots" is also represented in its mix form as seen its music video form. Of the duo's twelve studio albums at the time, all but their third Out for the Count were represented in some form.

Short Stories had its tracks picked by the duo whilst disc two Longdogs had its songs picked by the duo's forum Longdogs, achieved by each of their albums (including live albums) where each of their studio and live albums bar Cold Cuts had a poll where the winner from each poll made it onto Longdogs.

== Inclusion ==
- All of the band's studio albums prior to its release are represented in some form or another except for 1991's Out for the Count.
- Four tracks are re-recorded in the studio for the album. These are Cold Frontier's "Are We Alright", "Exile" (the only track from Show of Hands to be included although it was also rerecorded for Lie of the Land and a shorter version of "Tall Ships" is present on Show of Hands), "Santiago" (a live staple dating back to their days with Alianza) and "Crow on the Cradle".
- "Cousin Jack" from Dark Fields is represented in a previously unreleased live version, whilst "The Galway Farmer" from Beat about the Bush is recorded live from the Royal Albert Hall in 2001 (as documented on The Big Gig VHS), as air "Columbus", "You're Mine", "The Blind Fiddler", "The Setting/Mary from Dungloe" and "Be Lucky".
- "Tall Ships" is the full 22 minute version from Tall Ships as opposed to the much shorter version on Show of Hands.
- "Roots" is the shorter, re-arranged remixed version intercute with parts of their live performance at the 33rd Trowbridge Village Pump Festival rather than the album version from Witness.
- The 1993 EP Columbus is represented with its title track, although it is the released live version recorded live at Royal Albert Hall on 24 March 1996.
- "The Bristol Slaver" is mistakenly referred to as a song from Lie of the Land.

== Track listing ==
Short Stories
No.	Title	Original album	Length
1.	"Roots"	2007 remix (originally on Witness, 2006)	4:09
2.	"Are We Alright"	2007 re-recording (originally on Cold Frontier, 2001)	3:04
3.	"Exile"	2007 re-recording (originally on Show of Hands, 1987)	3:47
4.	"Country Life"	Country Life, 2003	3:57
5.	"Widecombe Fair"	Cold Frontier, 2001	3:26
6.	"The Falmouth Packet / Haul Away Joe"	Witness, 2006	5:32
7.	"Santiago"	2007 re-recording (originally from Alianza, 1992)	6:13
8.	"Armadas"	Beat about the Bush, 1994	4:30
9.	"The Blue Cockade"	Beat about the Bush, 1994	6:02
10.	"Crow on the Cradle"	2007 re-recording (originally from Cold Cuts, 2002)	4:28
11.	"The Preacher"	Lie of the Land, 1995	4:25
12.	"Cousin Jack"	Live version (originally from Dark Fields, 1997)	6:50
13.	"Cold Frontier"	Cold Frontier, 2001	4:15
14.	"Hard Shoulder"	Country Life, 2003	5:17
15.	"Captains"	Lie of the Land, 1995	4:03
16.	"The Galway Farmer"	The Big Gig (live), 2001 (originally from Beat about the Bush, 1994)	5:42

Longdogs
No.	Title	Original album	Length
1.	"Columbus (Didn't Find America)"	Live at the Royal Albert Hall (live), 1996 (originally from Columbus EP/single, 1993)	5:13
2.	"You're Mine"	Cold Frontier, 2001	4:02
3.	"The Blind Fiddler"	Live (live), 1994	3:00
4.	"The Setting / Mary from Dungloe"	As You Were (live), 2005	3:54
5.	"The Bristol Slaver"	Dark Fields, 1997	3:52
6.	"Port Isaac"	The Path, 2003	4:23
7.	"The Train / Blackwaterside"	Folk Music, 1998	6:51
8.	"Be Lucky"	As You Were (live), 2005	5:10
9.	"Longdog"	Dark Fields, 1997	2:44
10.	"The Keeper"	Lie of the Land, 1995	5:18
11.	"The Downeaster 'Alexa'"	Covers, 2000	3:10
12.	"The Oak"	Beat about the Bush, 1994	3:03
13.	"Innocents' Song / Gwithian"	Witness, 2006	4:35
14.	"Tall Ships"	Tall Ships, 1990 (Shorter version present on Show of Hands, 1987)	21:56
