= Hard Hats =

Studio album by Phil Beer
- Released: 18 August 1994
- Recorded: 1994
- Studio: FFG Studios, Bredon, Worcestershire; The Old Court
- Genre: Rock; folk rock
- Label: HTD Records
- Producer: Phil Beer

Phil Beer chronology
Mandoline (1979)	Hard Hats (1994)	The Works (1998)

Professional ratings
Review scores
Source	Rating
Allmusic	2/5 stars

Hard Hats is the second studio album by Phil Beer, released in 1994, some 15–16 years after his previous solo album, Mandoline, though between those years he had worked on other albums with Paul Downes amongst other artists.

Being released around the same time as Beat about the Bush by Show of Hands, this album has a rocky edge to it, and was released on CD and cassette. Allmusic rated the album (mistakenly titled as Hard Cats) 2/5 stars but did not give a review.

== Track listing ==
All tracks composed by Phil Beer; except where noted.

1. "Fireman's Song" (Don Bilston)
2. "Chance"
3. "This Far"
4. "Blinded by Love" (Mick Jagger, Keith Richards)
5. "More" (R. Hill)
6. "Blind Fiddler" (Traditional; arranged by Phil Beer)
7. "This Year" (Steve Knightley)
8. "Hard Hats"
9. "She Could Laugh" (Steve Knightley)
10. "Think It Over"
