= Live at Nettlebed =

Live album by Downes and Beer
- Released: 15 December 2008
- Recorded: Early 2007, Nettlebed
- Genre: Folk music
- Length: 49:52
- Label: Talking Elephant

Downes and Beer chronology
| Live in Concept (1980) | Live at Nettlebed (2008) |

Live at Nettlebed is the second live album by Downes and Beer. It is their first album in almost 29 years. Recorded live at one of their rare reunions, in early 2007 at Nettlebed Folk Club.

A BBC article gives a positive review for the album.

== Track listing ==
1. "Intro-Bruce / Coming rains - 6:23
2. "Nancys / Atune set" - 4:20
3. "Call it a Loan" - 5:09
4. "Life goes on - 3:23
5. "Honour and praise" - 5:48
6. "Opinion on Love" - 3:30
7. "Sir Richard's song" -5:19
8. "Both Sexes" - 3:47
9. "Blues in D" - 4:39
10. "Sheath and Knife" - 7:04
11. "There but for Fortune" - 5:11
12. "Go to work on Monday" - 3:23
