= As You Were (Show of Hands album) =

Live album by Show of Hands
- Released: 2005
- Recorded: 3 November–5 December 2004, England
- Venue: Various: Bloomsbury Theatre (London, 3 November); Regal Centre (Worksop, 18 November); Theatre by the Lake (Keswick, 21 November); Landmark Theatre (Ilfracombe, 25 November); Pacific Road Arts Centre (Birkenhead, 26 November); The Lowry (Salford, 27 November); Cheltenham Town Hall (Cheltenham, 28 November); Princess Pavilion (Falmouth, 3 December); Ariel Centre (Totnes, 4 December); Manor Pavilion (Sidmouth, 5 December)
- Genre: Folk; English folk
- Length: 127:05
- Label: Hands on Music
- Producer: Mick Dolan

Show of Hands chronology
Country Life (2003)	As You Were (2005)	Witness (2006)

As You Were is the fourth live album by English acoustic roots duo Show of Hands. Following the release of their acclaimed tenth studio album Country Life in 2003, which itself was promoted by a tour, the duo were named the "Best Live Act" at the 2004 BBC Radio 2 Folk Awards. The live interest in the duo ultimately lead to a greater interest when the band announced their Autumn Tour 2004. The tour itself ran from November–December and included Miranda Sykes as a collaborator, her first collaboration with the duo. With the band's producer and engineer of the era Mick Dolan, the entire tour was recorded onto MiniDisc, with the duo subsequently ploughing through each concert recording the following day to identify the best performances and then collating and working through the "A list again" to find the best tracks to create the live album.

The album was released in 2005 on the duo's own record label Hands on Music. Although it was originally only sold at the duo's live performances and on their online shop, the critical success it became lead the duo to re-release it conventionally. The album was released to critical acclaim, with David Kidman of NetRhythms declaring it a "great set".

== Background and contents ==
In 2003, Show of Hands released two albums, the instrumental release The Path, released to commemorate the silver jubilee of the South West Coast Path, and the acclaimed Country Life. The latter was showcased the duo work on harder-edged songs that were more politically, socially and environmentally concerned, including songs based on rural issues. The title track, a "stirring" and "finely honed rant about the desecration of British country life" and "an acerbic indictment of modern values", brought the band renewed attention. The album itself, described by one journalist as the duo's "most ambitious" and "exciting" release up to that point, was voted the 22nd all-time favourite album by Devonians in a BBC Radio Devon poll in April 2004. Also in 2004, the duo won the BBC Radio 2 Folk Award for "Best Live Act".

Although the duo had toured in promotion of Country Life in both 2003 and 2004, they decided to separate their touring in Autumn 2004 as a separate tour. Following on from their "Best Live Act" accolade, the duo decided to record their fourth live album on the tour. Of the duo's first three live albums, only the last of them, Cold Cuts (2002), was not based around a single concert, instead being a compilation of performances throughout the tour. The duo decided to follow this template for the new album. Despite the Autumn namesake of the tour, it in fact ran from November–December. The tour ran through England for ten concerts between 3 November–5 December, all of which are represented on the album. On the tour, the duo were joined by double bass player and vocalist Miranda Sykes, who would later become the duo's unofficial "third member". The tour was considered by David Kidman of NetRhythms to be a "landmark tour even by the lads' own exacting standards."

== Content ==
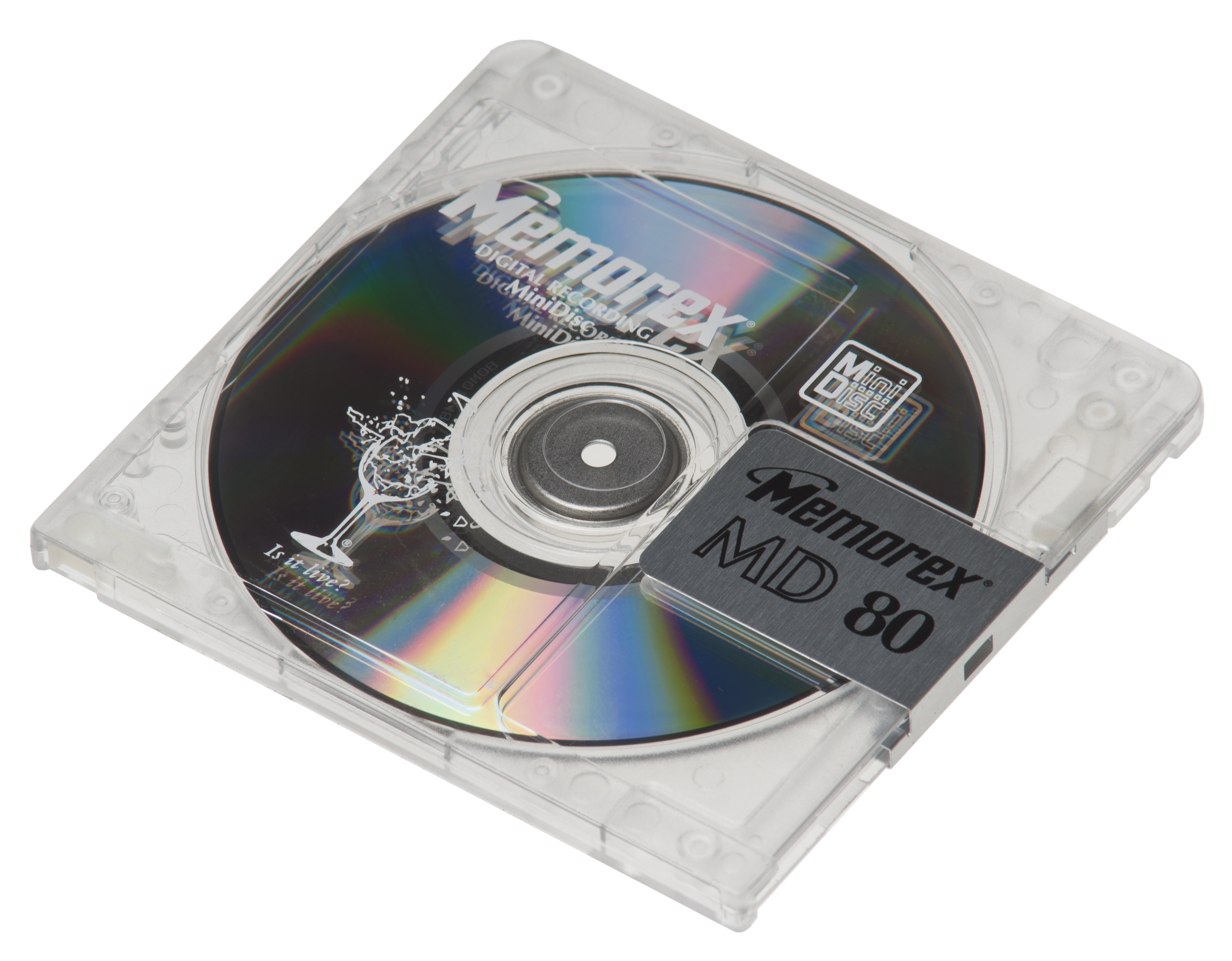
The duo recorded each of the tour's concerts onto MiniDisc before ploughing through them to choose highlights.

The duo recorded the album with the helm of their sporadic producer Dolan on their 2004 winter tour, with Dolan credited as the album's producer. Intended as a "permanent memento" of the tour, Dolan and the duo recorded the entirety of each of their concerts from the tour onto MiniDisc, and then ploughed through each of the concerts the following day to identify the duo's best performances, and then collated and worked through the "A list" of the chosen highlights to find the very best of those performances and then feature those as the album. Sound Performance are credited as "making" the album, whilst Dave Pick mastered the album.

The album contains twenty-two tracks and was the duo's first collaboration with their long time unofficial "third member" Miranda Sykes, who plays double bass and sings. Jenna, who Knightley had recorded the album Western Approaches with earlier in the year, features on vocals and keyboard on "Smile She Said" and "Crooked Man". Knightley's composition "The Train", which had originally featured on Dark Fields (1997), was presented in its fourth version as a medley with "Santiago" and "The Soldier's Joy." One review noted that "even the sometimes-jaded and latterly more-than-slightly-predictable theatricality of Galway Farmer captivates on this occasion."

The album's final song, "Don't Be a Stranger", finishes at 5:05 but in fact runs to 16:28. This is due to the inclusion of a hidden track appearing after three and a half minutes of silence. The hidden track itself is not a single song but snippets of the duo talking between songs, in what is described as "between song banter", combined with short songs. It consists firstly of notes about "Beach Towns", then notes about "The Eclipse", followed by a reprise of "The Galway Farmer", a joke performance of "Paranoid", a reprise of "Be Lucky" and notes about losing things. This was the duo's third hidden track, following the two hidden on Dark Fields (1997) and Folk Music (1998).

== Release ==
The album was released in 2005 on the duo's own record label Hands on Music with the catalogue number HMCD22. It was originally only sold at the duo's live performances and on their website, being intended as a "souvenir recording" solely for the fans attending the concerts. Nonetheless, that the album was well received meant that the duo re-released it for a conventional commercial release, and has since "become an important part of the Show of Hands catalogue."

The album was very well received. Calling it a "handsome release", David Kidman of NetRhythms was very favourable, saying that "Steve and Phil sure have put this release together with care, respectful of their fans and the pleasure it will give them; they've painstakingly listened to recordings made on the tour, and chosen what they consider to be the very best of the performances for inclusion on this set, which is intended as a permanent memento of a landmark tour even by the lads' own exacting standards. Certainly it's the way I'd want to remember them if suddenly and inexplicably all other SoH records were mysteriously erased!". He concluded that "firstly to any SoH devotee this set is self-recommending, whereas secondly to those (are there any?) who haven't yet succumbed it ought to be, so to this latter category of punters I'll just say get yourself along to a SoH gig pronto and snap up a copy of this great set, for after the gig you will definitely want a lasting memento of "as you were" feeling at the time."

The conventional version of the album came to be due to the album's glowing reception. One song from the album, "The Setting / Mary from Dungloe", featured on the duo's retrospective compilation album Roots: The Best of Show of Hands (2007). The song is included on the second disc of the compilation, subtitled Longdogs, whose songs were the winners of individual polls on the duo's former internet forum Longdogs to find the best track on each of the duo's albums.

== Track listing ==
On the back cover, the songs are numbered consecutively from 1 to 22. Disc one lasts 51:10, disc two lasts 75:51.

All songs written by Steve Knightley, except where noted.

=== Disc one ===
1. "Longdog" – 3:25
2. "You're Mine" – 4:38
3. "Willin'" (Lowell George) – 4:06
4. "Mary From Dungloe" (Trad arr. Knightley/Phil Beer) / "The Setting" (Ralph McTell) – 4:02
5. "The Oak" – 4:18
6. "The Blue Cockade" (Trad arr. Knightley/Beer) – 6:05
7. "Crazy Boy" – 5:43
8. "Crow On The Cradle" (Sydney Carter) – 4:37
9. "I Promise You" – 4:39
10. "Maybe" – 4:11
11. "Be Lucky" – 5:26

=== Disc two ===
1. "The Blind Fiddler" (Trad arr. Knightley/Beer) / "Galway Farmer" (Knightley/Beer) – 8:27
2. "Captains" – 4:33
3. "Corrina, Corrina" (Bob Dylan) – 3:38
4. "Smile She Said" – 4:39
5. "Crooked Man" – 4:05
6. "Are We Alright" – 3:31
7. "Cousin Jack" – 6:09
8. "The Train" / "Santiago" / "The Soldier's Joy" (Trad arr. Knightley/Beer) – 11:46
9. "Widecombe Fair" – 4:19
10. "Country Life" – 8:25
11. "Don't Be A Stranger" – 16:18^{*}

^{*} Track 11 is made up of 5:03 of "Don't Be A Stranger", 3:33 of silence and then 7:42 of live between-song banter.

=== Hidden track ===
The mentioned "between song banter" hidden track was made up of...

1. Notes about "beach towns"
2. Notes about "the eclipse"
3. "The Galway Farmer" (Reprise)
4. "Paranoid"
5. "Be Lucky" (Reprise)/Notes about "losing things"

== Personnel ==
- Steve Knightley - vocals, guitar, mandocello, cuatro
- Phil Beer - vocals, guitar, slide guitar, fiddle, mandolin, cuatro
- Miranda Sykes - vocals, double bass
- Jenna Witts - vocals and keyboards on tracks 15 & 16
