= Live 2003 =

Live 2003 may refer to:

- Beer and Sandland Live 2003, a live album by Phil Beer and Deb Sandland
- Live 2003, a live album by Coldplay
