= Show of Hands Live =

Live album by Show of Hands
- Released: 1992
- Recorded: 8 June 1992
- Venue: The Bull Hotel, Bridport
- Genre: Folk; English folk
- Length: 76:01
- Label: The Road Goes to Forever (1994), Hands on Music (1999)
- Producer: Mike Trim

Show of Hands chronology
Alianza (1992)	Show of Hands Live (1992)	Beat about the Bush (1994)

Live (also known as Live '92 and Show of Hands Live) is the first live album by English acoustic roots duo Show of Hands. After the duo had recorded three studio albums on cassette from 1987–1991, the last of these being Out for the Count, the duo set on recording a live album for their first Compact Disc release. They enlisted Mark Trim to engineer and produce a live album of the duo's performance at The Bull Hotel, Bridport, in the duo's native Devon. The album features all sixteen songs from the performance which featured numerous guest musicians, including the band's long-time collaborator Matt Clifford and Beer's sporadic collaborator Paul Downes.

The album was released in 1992 by independent record label The Road Goes on Forever, before falling out of print and being re-released in 1999 by the duo's own record label Hands on Music. It received very favourable reviews from critics, and broke the band into the festival circuit in 1993. The duo also hired Trim to produce their subsequent studio album Beat about the Bush (1994) due to his engineering work on the album. Today, Show of Hands Live is often seen as the duo's first albums, with their three cassette albums being dropped from the duo's "canon". A 2007 poll on the duo's internet forum established "The Blind Fliddler" as fans' favourite track from the album, and it was subsequently included on the duo's best of album Roots: The Best of Show of Hands (2007) as a result.

== Background and gig ==
In 1987, Devonian folk musicians Steve Knightley and Phil Beer formed the duo Show of Hands. The musicians had been friends for a long time and had worked together before. Their first recorded collaboration featured on Beer's first live album with Paul Downes, 1980's Live in Concept. Show of Hands formed whilst Beer was a member of The Albion Band. The duo's first album, Show of Hands, was released on cassette in 1987, followed by Tall Ships in 1990. The two albums were sold only at the duo's live performances. Later on in 1990, Beer left The Albion Band, letting Show of Hands become a full musical partnership, recording the third and final cassette album, Out for the Count in The Old Court in 1991. Although the duo continued to perform live throughout 1992, that same year they formed the band Alianza with Dave Townsend with three exiled Chilean musicians, exploring a fusion between English folk music and Chilean music.

Meanwhile, the duo had yet to record a Compact Disc (CD) release of their own, but opted to release a live album as their first CD release instead of a studio album due to their reputation as a live act. They decided to record one of their live performances, and enlisted record producer and engineer Mark Trim to a produce a live album of the duo's local performance at The Bull Hotel in Bridport, Dorset on 8 June 1992. The hotel has won many awards and is described as "Dorset's Boutique Hotel". An 1877 plaque on the hotel describes it as the "Knight's Bull Hotel". The duo, who had never previously signed to a record label, signed to independent record label The Road Goes on Forever for the live album's release.

== Content ==
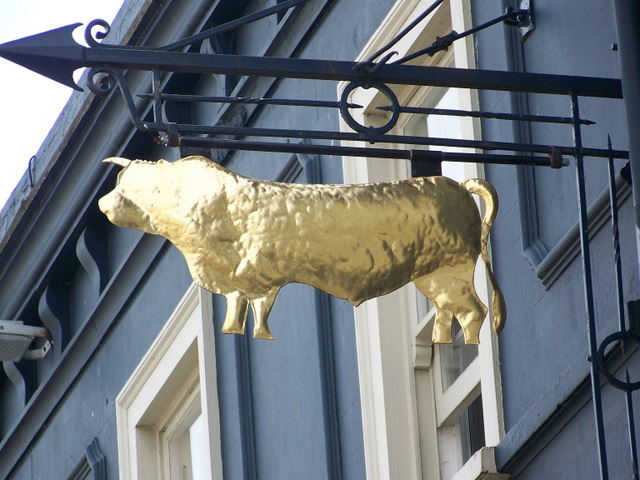
The sign of The Bull Hotel, Bridport, where the album was recorded.

The performance took place on 8 June 1992 at The Bull Hotel in Bridport, a town in Dorset, just 40 miles from the Duo's native Exeter, Devon. In addition to singing the lead vocals, Steve Knightley played the acoustic guitar and cello-mandolin, whilst Phil Beer performed backing vocals, cuatro, fiddle, acoustic guitar and mandolin. Numerous guest musicians played during the performance; Beer's sporadic collaborator Paul Downes played guitar, Mike Silver played guitar and performed backing vocals, Polly Bolton performed vocals whilst the duo's long-time collaborator Mike Clifford performed backing vocals and played the keyboard.

Ten of the songs were written by Knightley alone, whilst one song, "Caught in the Rain", was co-written with Clifford. The remaining five tracks were traditional folk songs. The performance began with two traditional performances, "Silver Dagger" and "The Blind Fiddler". Many of the album's songs had not previously been recorded by the duo, and several have not been recorded since. Some of the songs were also recorded with Alianza at the same time, including Knightley standard "Santiago". The album's fifth song, "Exile", had already established itself as one of the duo's concert standards, originally being recorded for their 1987 debut album before being re-recorded for Lie of the Land (1995). "Santiago" was one of the songs previously not released by the duo, and it has gone on to become a concert standard. "Six O'Clock Waltz" was recorded for their second album Tall Ships (1990) which was already out of print by the time of the release of Show of Hands Live. The original version of the song has never been re-released, and as such as never been released on CD.

== Release ==
Following the concert, the duo spent the rest of June and all of July recording their only album with Alianza, who split up a year after the release of their sole, eponymous album. Meanwhile, later on in 1992, the live album was released by The Road Goes on Forever at a similar time to the Alianza album, which was released on the same record label. The two albums marked the duo's only albums released on the label. The album cover, which featured the names of the duo, was their last album to do so. Meanwhile, the album cover arises confusion as to the album title. It has been referred to as both Show of Hands Live or simply Live, due to the cover featuring "Show of Hands" in a standard typeface whilst "Live" was italicised. Further confusing is that the duo refer to the album by neither name but as Live '92, which is the name given in the liner notes for their best-of album Roots: The Best of Show of Hands (2007). The album was soon out of print, but was re-released in 1999 by the duo's own record label Hands on Music, which was established in 1995.

The album was released to a positive reception, with the duo's website describing the reviews as "excellent". The reviews helped the duo break into the festival circuit in 1993 and later in the year they toured with Ralph McTell on his autumn tour. Mike Trim's recording engineer work on the album was described as "successful" by the duo and it inspired them to hire Trim to produce their subsequent studio album Beat about the Bush (1994), which was their first CD studio album. In 1996, the duo released their second live album Live at the Royal Albert Hall. Reviewing that album for The Living Tradition, Graham Gurrin praised how it only had three of its sixteen tracks in common with Show of Hands Live. The performance of "The Blind Fiddler" from Show of Hands Live was included on the duo's best of album Roots: The Best of Show of Hands (2007). It features on the second disc, subtitled Longdogs, whose songs were chosen by the users of the duo's former internet forum Longdogs being asked to vote for their favourite song from each of the duo's albums, with the winners of each poll forming the disc's track listing. "Yankee Clipper", meanwhile, had featured on the various artist compilation album A Feast of Folk (2001), containing "16 Evergreen Favourites".

== Track listing ==
All songs written by Steve Knightley, except where noted.

1. "Silver Dagger" (Trad) – 4:05
2. "The Blind Fiddler" (Trad) – 4:23
3. "Don’t It Feel Good" – 4:15
4. "I Still Wait" – 5:04
5. "Exile" – 5:06
6. "Yankee Clipper" (Trad) – 3:02
7. "Man Of War" – 4:32
8. "Bonnie Light Horseman" (Trad) – 4:07
9. "I’ll Put a Stake Through His Heart" – 3:38
10. "Low Down in the Broome" (Trad) – 2:59
11. "Six O’Clock Waltz" – 5:37
12. "Sit You Down" – 5:57
13. "Wolf at the Door" – 5:12
14. "Caught in the Rain" (Knightley/Matt Clifford) – 4:38
15. "Santiago" – 7:45
16. "It's All Your Fault" – 5:33

== Personnel ==
- Steve Knightley - cello-mandolin, guitar, vocals
- Phil Beer - backing vocals, cuatro, fiddle, guitar, mandolin
- Polly Bolton – vocals
- Matt Clifford – backing vocals, keyboards
- Paul Downes - guitar
- Mike Silver - backing vocals, guitar
