= Lie of the Land =

Studio album by Show of Hands
- Released: October 1995
- Recorded: July 1995
- Studio: Free for Good Studios, Bradon, Gloucestershire, England
- Genre: Folk; acoustic rock
- Length: 47:40
- Label: Isis CD IS09; Hands on Music HMCD02
- Producer: Gerard O’Farrell

Show of Hands chronology
Beat about the Bush (1994)	Lie of the Land (1995)	Live at the Royal Albert Hall (1996)

Lie of the Land is the fifth studio album by English acoustic roots duo Show of Hands. Following the live band setting of the band's previous album, 1994's Beat about the Bush, the duo sought a simpler sound that featured just themselves, with the duo trying to capture their live sound, which included experimenting with DI units and making the maximum use of pick-ups and pre-amplifiers. The album was produced by Gerard O'Farrell, who by this point had become the band's manager, and recorded in July 1995 in Bredon, Gloucestershire.

It was released in 1995 by Isis Records, before being re-rereleased by the duo's own label Hands on Music re-released the album in 1996 after the original version went out of print. The album was a turning point for the band, featuring major press attention from magazines such as Mojo and Q, the latter naming it "folk album of the year". Oldies.com note that the album was "considered one of that year’s finest folk releases."

== Background ==
After folk musician Phil Beer left The Albion Band in late 1990, it allowed he and Steve Knightley to treat their project Show of Hands as a full-time musical collaboration. Show of Hands' work prior to Beer's departure from The Albion Band consisted of two albums, Show of Hands (1987) and Tall Ships (1990). The newly prioritised Show of Hands recorded Out for the Count at The Old Court in 1991, and released it on cassette that year, sold at the band's live performances. The duo briefly entered a hiatus as Show of Hands to allow to form the Anglo-Chilean band Alianza with Dave Townsend with three Chilean musicians, exploring world music. They released a self-titled album in 1992, becoming Knightley and Beer's first CD release. During the Alianza project, the duo recorded a performance from 8 June 1992 at Bridport's Bull Hotel, working with engineer Mike Trim and released it on The Road Goes on Forever in 1992 as Show of Hands Live, the duo's first CD, but by the time of its release, the band's previous three albums were out of print.

The duo recorded their first, and only, studio album for TWAH! Records, Beat about the Bush, in January 1994, and it was released the following month. Produced by Trim, due to his successful work on Show of Hands Live, he and the duo aimed for an "elusive "radio friendly" folk/roots album that retained the band's live sound whilst adding a rhythm section. Whilst the album did not attract much radio attention as the duo had wanted, it helped make the duo more popular and built upon their fan base. The duo left TWAH! Records and signed to Isis Records, the label which saw the original release of Lie of the Land.

== Recording ==
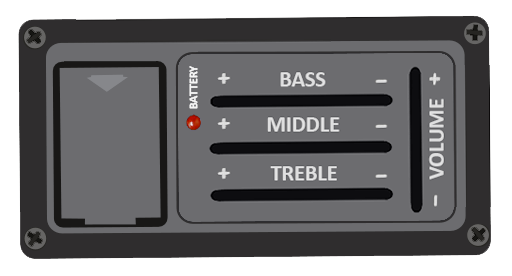
The duo made maximum use of their instrument pre-amplifiers (acoustic guitar pre-amp pictured).

Lie of the Land was recorded in July 1995 at Free for Good Studios, Bredon, near Tewkesbury in Gloucestershire, a studio which belongs to Dave Pick and whose name is often initialised to FFG. This is the first time the duo recorded a studio album outside of Devon or Dorset. The album was then mixed at Sonica Studios, London, in August 1995. There are two traditional tracks on the album and ten Knightley compositions, including a re-recording of "Exile", one of the duo's earlier songs which had featured on their first album.

The album was produced by Gerard O'Farrell, and displays a simpler, stripped-down folk sound, as opposed to the full-band set up that the duo had used on their previous album, Beat about the Bush, which the duo did not see as successful as wanted. On this album, the duo tried to capture their live sound by recording all the instruments using a DI unit. The band had originally hired O'Farrell, an engineer/producer, for their live shows, following the release of Beat About the Bush. By the time he produced Lie of the Land, nonetheless, he was now the duo's manager.

Knightley said in an interview two years later that "normally when people take acoustic instruments into a studio they get the mikes out. Like, 'sorry everyone - that may be what you heard live but now it's going to sound like a PROPER acoustic guitar.' Gerard [O'Farrell] was saying from his point of view the D.I. is what makes us sound different and it can kick in effects at a massive rate. The thump you get from the pickup is what turns the music into acoustic rock." He also later summed up the recording by noting "overdubs were minimal" and that the duo "made maximum use of [their] instrument pickups and pre-amps."

== Release and reception ==
The album was released in October 1995 on the independent record label Isis Records. Later, after releasing the duo's compilation album Backlog 1987–1991, it became was their first studio album to be released on the duo's own label Hands on Music, having re-issued the album. Their debut album, Beat about the Bush, was originally released on TWAH! Records before it was re-released on Hands on Music in 1999. The album cover was designed by Rob O'Connor, who also designed the cover for their previous album, Beat about the Bush. It features John Carpenter, who worked post-retirement teaching Latin at the nearby Beaminster school, with a bird sat on his arm. The album cover was later included in the window display collage featured as the album cover of the duo's compilation album Roots: The Best of Show of Hands (2007), which features four songs from the album, namely "The Preacher", "Captains", "The Keeper" and a re-recording of "Exile".

The album was seen as a turning point, as it was given attention by major publications who gave it praiseful reviews. Bradley Torreano of Allmusic later noted that the album "finally got them noticed by the British press". Mojo said the album created "a powerful, fresh sounding music with both integrity and widespread appeal", while Q magazine called it a "startlingly good" album and went one step further in voting it their "folk album of the year" in 1996. Oldies.com note that the album was "considered one of that year’s finest folk releases." Knightley himself, whilst writing about the album in 2007, acknowledged the album earned them "some excellent critical feedback".

Having by now built up a considerable fanbase through their mailing list, largely due to the success of Lie of the Land, the duo and O’Farrell took the gamble of hiring London’s Royal Albert Hall for a performance on the evening of 24 March 1996. The duo's website biography says that "hiring the hall to the amusement of the media and the cynicism of sceptics they had the last laugh, with a sold out show. It was a huge gamble but the night of March 24, 1996 proved that for this enigmatic, indy duo anything was possible." The performance was released as the band's second live album, Live at the Royal Albert Hall, later on in 1996, and became the duo's best selling album. The duo also released the documentary film Acoustic Workshop on VHS in 1996, described as a "unique insight into the arrangements, instruments and techniques" of the duo's music. "The Man in Green" was included on the various artist compilation album The Best of British Folk (2000).

== Track listing ==
All songs written by Steve Knightley, except where noted.

1. "The Hunter" – 5:03
2. "Unlock Me" – 3:43
3. "The Well" – 3:50
4. "The Keeper" – 5:03
5. "Captains" – 4:04
6. "Weary" – 2:01
7. "Ratcliffe Highway" (Trad arr. Knightley/Phil Beer) – 4:52
8. "Safe As Houses" – 3:19
9. "The Man In Green" – 3:38
10. "The Preacher" – 4:29
11. "M Ferguson" (Trad arr. Knightley/Beer) – 2:10
12. "Exile" – 5:22

== Personnel ==
- Steve Knightley - vocals, cello-mandolin, concertina, cuatro, guitar
- Phil Beer - vocals, bass guitar, cello-mandolin, cuatro, fiddle, guitar, mandolin, viola
- Sarah Allen - whistle
- Matt Clifford - keyboards, piano
- Nick Scott - pipes
