= Mandorock =

Studio album by Phil Beer Band
- Released: 2000
- Genre: Folk; folk rock
- Length: 32:33
- Label: Self-released

Phil Beer Band chronology
The Works (1998)	Mandorock (2000)	Ridgeriders (2001)

Mandorock is a studio album by the Phil Beer Band in 2000. Like the follow-up Once in a Blue Moon it is very rare. Mandorock is the first Phil Beer Band album, and Beer's fifth solo studio album. Mandorock 2000 Live, released in 2009, a live recording from the Phil Beer Band from this era.

The song "Red River Valley" appears on Box Set One (2010). However, in the liner notes for that album, he states the song appears on Once in a Blue Moon, whereas it appears here on this album instead at track 3, not featuring on One in a Blue Moon at all.

== Track listing ==
1. Gold Watch Blues 3:49
2. Devil's Right Hand 3:10
3. Red River Valley 4:46
4. Tamworth Girls 3:11
5. For My Next Trick I'll Need a Volunteer 2:48
6. Brother Don't You Walk Away 3:57
7. Simon Smith and the Amazing Dancing Bear 1:13
8. Music in the Air 2:28
9. Long Distance Love 7:14
10. Gone At Last 4:59

== Personnel ==
- Phil Beer: Fiddle
- Dobro: "Fiddle, Vocals"
