= Live at the Royal Albert Hall (Show of Hands album) =

Live album by Show of Hands
- Released: August 1996
- Recorded: 24 March 1996
- Venues: Royal Albert Hall, London, England
- Genres: Folk; English folk
- Length: 76:23
- Label: Hands on Music
- Producer: Gerard O’Farrell

Show of Hands chronology
Lie of the Land (1995)	Live at the Royal Albert Hall (1996)	Dark Fields (1997)

Live at the Royal Albert Hall is the second live album by English acoustic roots duo Show of Hands. Following the success of their stripped-down fifth studio album Lie of the Land, the duo experienced attention from major publications, who praised the album, and the duo's fan base had built. Nonetheless, the duo were unable to commerce any performances in London. Their duo and their manager and producer Gerard O'Farrell took the gamble of hosting the city's historic Royal Albert Hall for a concert on 24 March 1996. The concert would be an attempt to gather all of the duo's fans and to raise the duo's profile. The duo were ridiculed for booking the hall, with many saying the performance would not sell out. Nonetheless, not only did the performance sell out, but it did so with advance orders, and it raised the duo's profile.

Producer and manager Gerard O'Farrell recorded the event for a live album on the cost of £200, and the duo released it on their own label Hands on Music in August 1996. It was released to positive reviews, with one review stating that it "stands alone as a showcase for the best of the band's repertoire over the last couple of years." The album became the duo's best-selling album to date, a title it would hold for many years, and had sold 4,000-5,000 copies by mid-1997. The duo have since performed at the Royal Albert Hall on three other occasions.

== Background and concert ==
Show of Hands became a collaboration for Devonian folk musicians Steve Knightley and Phil Beer in 1987, although the two had walked together several times before. The duo recorded the cassette-only albums Show of Hands (1987) and Tall Ships (1990) whilst Beer was still a member of The Albion Band, but Beer left The Albion Band in late 1990, allowing Show of Hands to become a full-time partnership. They recorded their last cassette-only album, Out for the Count, in 1991, and formed Anglo-Chilean band Alianza with Dave Townsend with three Chilean musicians, exploring world music. Alianza released a self-titled album in 1992, becoming Knightley and Beer's first CD release. Knightley and Beer soon continued performing as a duo and, with engineer Mike Trim, recorded a performance of Show of Hands from 8 June 1992 at Bridport's Bull Hotel, and released it on The Road Goes on Forever in 1992 as Show of Hands Live, the duo's first CD, but by the time of its release, the band's previous three albums were out of print, leading to it often being referred to as the band's album. (Note: Though the cassette albums have not returned to print, selected tracks from them were released as the compilation Backlog 1987–1991 in 1995.)

The band liked how the live album sounded and hired Mike Trim to produce their first CD studio album, Beat about the Bush, released on TWAH! Records in February 1994, an album that helped build on the band's success, although "despite Mike Trim's best efforts", the album did not receive the radio attention it intended, and the duo simplified their sound for their subsequent album, Lie of the Land, released in 1995 on Isis Records. Prior to the release of Lie of the Land, the band hired Gerard O'Farrell for live performances supporting Beat about the Bush, but he soon became the band's manager, and produced Lie of the Land.

Whilst the duo had gradually built success, Lie of the Land was seen as a major turning point, having been given attention by major publications such as Mojo and Q, the latter naming it "folk album of the year". The duo received more attention and, by early 1996, they had by now built up a considerable fanbase through their mailing list. But despite the escalating fan base, they still could not command any London gigs. Knightley, Beer and manager O’Farrell took the gamble of hiring London's famous Royal Albert Hall for a performance on the evening of 24 March 1996, in attempt to gather all of the duo's fans, and to raise the duo's profile. The duo hired the hall "to the amusement of the media and the cynicism of sceptics" and was considered a huge gamble. Nonetheless, the performance sold out in advance. Selling out the hall was "unprecedented for a folk act." One biography said that the success "proved that for this enigmatic, indy duo anything was possible." Knightley said in 1997 that "people still talk about it in glowing terms." He also noted that "quite a lot of people now know Show Of Hands as 'Those guys who did the Albert Hall'. So it's opened a lot of doors. In India there was a tremendous cachet - we were checked out by people who came to see us just because of having played the Royal Albert Hall. In America as well. So it exceeded all our expectations in that sense." O'Farrell commenced producing the performance as a live album, whose production work on Lie of the Land pleased the duo, who also liked the live sound of their previous live album Show of Hands Live, produced by Mike Trim. The album cost £200 on the night to record.

== Music ==
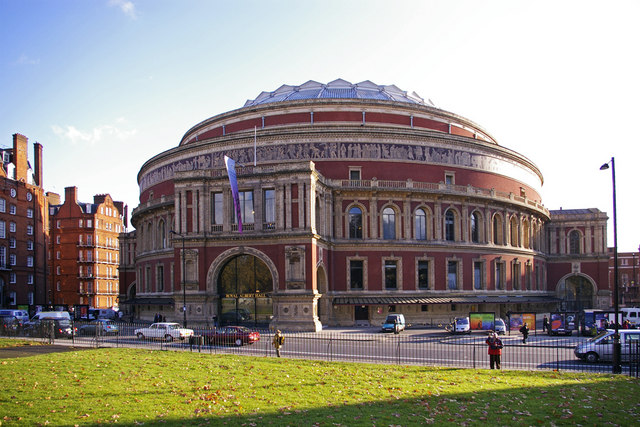
The Royal Albert Hall, where the album was recorded

The show took place on 24 March 1996, and featured various guest musicians. The album is slightly condensed from the performance and slightly re-arranged. The performance opened, as does the album, with "Columbus (Didn't Find America)", the title track of the band's 1993 extended play, written by Knightley during the duo's time with Alianza. The song is a protest song about the Spanish exploitation of the New World. The duo then performed "Day Has Come", a song from Beat about the Bush, but the music had been re-arranged, although the lyrics stayed the same. This was followed by Lie of the Land song "The Preacher", non-album track "Cutthroats, Crooks and Conmen", and two traditional tracks, "The Blue Cockade", which had featured on Beat about the Bush, and "The Soldiers Joy", at which point hints the band will play the "one about the horses" later, referring to "The Galway Farmer".

The band's long-standing live staple "Exile" plays next, which had recently been revisited following its re-recording on Lie of the Land, followed by "The Man in Green", Jacques Brel's "The Dove", "The Well", Lie of the Land opening track "The Hunter", which briefly, near its conclusion, incorporates an excerpt of "In the Jungle". This is followed by "Captains", the traditional track "The Blind Fiddler", and "Santiago", another track that dates from the Alianza days, and features on their only album. The main set closed with "The Galway Farmer", which features a fast fiddle solo from Beer. The song is about is about an Irishman betting on a horse at a race at Cheltenham Racecourse and winning, despite being ridiculed beforehand. After a minute following the performance of the song after the band had left the stage, they returned to the stage to perform an encore of the Cyndi Lauper song "Time After Time", featuring a squeezebox.

Sally Barker sings backing vocals on "Columbus (Didn't Find America)" and "Captains". Vladimir Vega performs pan pipes on "Columbus (Didn't Find America)", including prominently in the intro of the song, as well as on "The Hunter" and "Santiago", also performing backing vocals on the latter with Matt Clifford, who also performed backing vocals on "Columbus (Didn't Find America)" which he also played keyboards on, as well as on "Exile". "The Well" and "The Galway Farmer" feature pipes from Nick Scott, accordion from Sarah Allen and whistle from Biddy Blythe, who also plays flute on "The Galway Farmer".

The duo themselves play a wide range of instruments. Steve Knightley sings lead vocals on all songs, aside from the instrumental "The Soldiers Joy", guitar on eleven of the tracks, cello-mandolin on four of the tracks, cuatro on "The Preacher" and concertina on "Time After Time". Phil Beer sings backing vocals on nine of the tracks, plays the fiddle on five of the tracks, guitar on three tracks, the cello-mandolin on four tracks, cuatro on three tracks and mandolin on "The Hunter".

== Release and reception ==
"A Show of Hands concert at the Albert Hall is always an emotional affair, because the venue has played such a crucial role in their history. Sixteen years ago, the West Country duo of Steve Knightley and Phil Beer found it difficult to get London bookings, and so bravely hired the hall themselves, and proceeded to fill it with their followers."

— Robin Denselow of The Guardian in 2012 talking about the duo's affinity to the Albert Hall.

The performance was success, and the album entered post-production in spring and summer 1996. It was released in August 1996 as the first release of the band's own label, Hands on Music, with the catalogue number HMCD01. The album is slightly condensed from the original performance and some songs are presented in a different order. Living Tradition said the album "stands alone as a showcase for the best of the band's repertoire over the last couple of years." Reviewer Graham Gurrin noted "how well it shows the duo's exceptional abilities as performers. Thinking of Phil Beer as a multi-instrumentalist has become a cliché, but just listen to him play fiddle on "The Blind Fiddler" as if his life depended on it, his elegant cuatro on "Santiago" or the subtlety of his slide guitar work on "The Blue Cockade". The boy is a genius, and Steve Knightley must have been bathing his tonsils in honey for weeks before the gig. His harmonies with Sally Barker on "Captains" should be filed under S for spine-tingling. There is a hint of over-excitement in his voice throughout, which along with the contributions of the various guests gives a bit of an edge to the performances, particularly on stompers like "The Galway Farmer" and "The Hunter"," before praising how the album only has three tracks with the band's other live album, both albums having sixteen tracks.

Steve Knightley said in a 1997 interview that despite the cost of £200 to record on the night, the album "has been a great calling card to send festival promoters. So it exceeded all our expectations in that sense." It became the duo's best selling album, and was reported by Knightley in 1997 as to having sold 4,000-5,000 copies at that time.

The album is sometimes known as 24 March 1996, or 24 March 1996: Show of Hands Live at the Royal Albert Hall, due to the words displayed on the album cover. The album has been referred to as the band's best selling album to date, although this may no longer be true, and their later album Witness (2006) was reported as the duo's best-selling album. The duo subsequent album, 1997's Dark Fields, continuing Lie of the Land's stripped down approach, featured a single in "Crazy Boy", an attempt to further the profile of the duo achieved by the Royal Albert performance. The duo played further performances at the Royal Albert Hall in 2001, 2007 and 2012. The 2001 performance was released as a VHS concert film entitled The Big Gig. It was produced by Carlton who broadcast the film in two parts on television.

== Track listing ==
All songs written by Steve Knightley, except where noted.

1. "Columbus (Didn't Find America)" – 5:15
2. "Day Has Come" – 3:53
3. "The Preacher" – 4:28
4. "Cutthroats, Crooks and Conmen" – 3:27
5. "The Blue Cockade" (Trad arr. Knightley/Phil Beer) – 5:48
6. "The Soldiers Joy" (Trad arr. Knightley/Beer) – 1:35
7. "Exile" – 5:13
8. "The Man in Green" – 3:11
9. "The Dove" (Jacques Brel) – 4:10
10. "The Well" – 3:54
11. "The Hunter" – 4:55
12. "Captains" – 4:15
13. "The Blind Fiddler" (Trad arr. Knightley/Beer) – 3:57
14. "Santiago" – 7:16
15. "Galway Farmer" – 6:44
16. "Time After Time" (Rob Hyman, Cyndi Lauper) – 4:05

== Personnel ==
- Steve Knightley - vocals, cello-mandolin, cuatro, guitar
- Phil Beer - vocals, cello-mandolin, cuatro, fiddle, mandolin
- Matt Clifford - keyboards, vocals
- Sally Barker - vocals
- Sarah Allen - accordion
- Vladimir Vega - Pan pipes, vocals
- Biddy Blyth - flute, whistle
- Nick Scott - pipes
