= Beer and Sandland Live 2003 =

Beer and Sandland 2003

Live album by Phil Beer and Deb Sandland
- Released: 2004
- Recorded: 2003
- Genre: Folk music
- Label: Self-released
- Producer: Phil Beer

Phil Beer chronology
| "Ridgeriders" In Concert (2001) | Beer and Sandland 2003 (2004) | Rhythm Methodist (2004) |

Beer and Sandland Live 2003 is a live album by Phil Beer and occasional collaborator Deb Sandland (also a member of The Phil Beer Band). Released in 2004, it was only sold at the CD stall on Deb Sandland's 2004 tour and for a while thereafter on Show of Hands' mail order. The album was recorded live on Beer and Sandland's tour in 2003. The album was also released to complement Sandland's album My Prayer, which Beer produced and performed on.

== Track listing ==
1. "When You Go Away / Under the Rose"
2. "Hold Back the Tide"
3. "White Tribes"
4. "Varso Vianna"
5. "I Wouldn't Believe Your Radio"
6. "Cruel Sister"
7. "Long Black Veil"
8. "Still Crazy After All These Years"
9. "Leaving Blues"
10. "Broken Arrow"
