= Mandorock 2000 Live =

Live album by The Phil Beer Band
- Released: 15 June 2009
- Recorded: September 2000
- Genre: Folk rock
- Length: 73:03
- Label: Talking Elephant

The Phil Beer Band chronology
Mandorock (2000)	Mandorock 2000 Live (2009)	Ridgeriders (2001)

Mandorock 2000 Live is a live album by Phil Beer with The Phil Beer Band. It is a recording of a live performance of his very scarce album Mandorock at Hutingdon Hall, Worcester in September 2000. Though its most popular release was 2009, it is possible that earlier copies were released in 2000.

== Track listing ==
1. "The Shape I'm In" - 3:17
2. "Goldwatch Blues" - 4:23
3. "Tower of Song" - 4:56
4. "Adieu Sweet Lovely Nancy" - 5:18
5. "Frank And Jessie James" - 4:26
6. "Volcano" - 4:17
7. The Blues Melody: "Leaving Blues"/"Lonesome Whistle" - 8:46
8. "You Can Close Your Eyes" - 3:04
9. Tunes: "Goldrush"/"Jake's Jig"/"Rocky Road To Mylor" - 6:35
10. "Border County Town" - 4:30
11. "Long Distance Love" - 2:31
12. "Dominion Of the Sword" - 3:20
13. "Gone At Last" - 5:21
14. "No Surrender" - 3:58
15. "Ballad Of Henry Lee" - 3:52
16. "Scarecrow" - 4:21

== Personnel ==
- Phil Beer - vocals, guitar, mandolin
- Gareth Turner - melodeon
- Nick Quarmby - bass
- Steve Crickett - drums
- Deb Sandland - vocals
- Charlotte Ayrton - guitar, harmonica

Technical

- Audio Mixers: Mick Dolan; Will Thomas
- Photographer: Ron Hill
