= Live in Concept =

Live album by Downes and Beer
- Released: 1980
- Genre: Folk music
- Label: Roda Records

Downes and Beer chronology
Dance Without Music (1976)	Live in Concept (1980)	Live at Nettlebed (2008)

Live in Concept is the first live album by Downes and Beer, released in 1980. The album sees the band live collaborate with various musicians, including Mike Oldfield (due to Phil Beer's touring with him for Exposed), and also established both The Phil Beer Band who would record in the 2000s, and the first ever Show of Hands released recording, "Half Asleep", although this is a Downes and Beer recording with Steve Knightley guest appearing. This was the last album by the duo until another live album, recorded on one of their rare reunion performances in 2007, was released as Live at Nettlebed the year after. Paul Downes did work with Beer, however, for some Show of Hands performances in the early 1990s, one such performance being released as an album in 1994.

== Track listing ==
The album is a double album.

=== Sides one and two ===
1. "Intro" by Bob Plews - 1:00
2. "Passed You By" (Phil Beer) - 3:24
3. "List for a Sailor"/"Teetoaler Reel" (Traditional) - 3:15
4. "Pavanas" (Gaspan Sans)/"Andalusian Gypsies" (Benny Hill) - 5:24
5. "Cursed Anna" (Johnathon Kelly) - 5:00
6. "Things We Said Today" (John Lennon, Paul McCartney) - 5:13
7. "Across the Hills" (Leon Rosselson) - 4:44
8. "Rough with the Smooth" (Steve Ashley) (featuring Warwick Downes) - 5:22
9. "Do You Like the Battle" (Richard, Pegg) - 5:00

=== Sides three and four ===
1. "Intro" by Stuart Reed - 0:50
2. "Let Me Play" (Downes, Beer) - 3:14
3. "Both Sexes" (Traditional) - 4:15
4. "Them Toad Suckers" (Mason Williams) - 2:00
5. "Ode to Billy Joe" (Bobbie Gentry) - 5:29
6. "Life Goes on" (Paul Downes) - 2:54
7. "Old Fiddler" (Benny Hill) - 3:40
8. "My Canary's Got Circles Under His Eyes" (unknown) - 3:10
9. "Nuages/Sweet Georgia Brown" (unknown) - 4:00
10. "Half Alseep" (featuring Steve Knightley) - 4:10
11. "Fox on the Ruin" (Tony Hazzard) - 4:00
