= Beat about the Bush =

Beat About the Bush

Studio album by Show of Hands
- Released: 19 February 1994
- Recorded: January 1994
- Studio: Wytherston Studios, West Dorset, England, United Kingdom
- Genre: Folk; British folk rock; progressive folk
- Length: 55:20
- Label: Twah! records Twah105 (1994); Hands on Music HMCD08 (1999)
- Producer: Mike Trim

Show of Hands chronology
Show of Hands Live (1992)	Beat About the Bush (1994)	Lie of the Land (1995)

Beat About the Bush is the fourth studio album by English acoustic roots duo Show of Hands. Originally released by Twah! Records in 1994, it was their debut studio album to be released on CD, following the discontinued cassette albums that are Show of Hands from 1987, Tall Ships from 1990 and Out of the Count from 1991. It was their only studio album on Twah! Records, and was subsequently re-released in 1999 on the duo's own label, Hands on Music.

Following Mike Trim's successful recording engineer work on Show of Hands Live, the joint vision on Beat About the Bush was to produce an elusive "radio friendly" folk/roots album that retained the band's live sound whilst adding a rhythm section. However, despite positive critical reception, radio reaction was minimal, and the duo subsequently moved towards a stripped down folk sound, and would not return to bass and percussion until 2006's Witness.

The track "The Galway Farmer" would later be a staple on every live performance by the duo (and Steve Knightley solo). It is one of the band's better known tracks, and would end up being on various other albums in different recordings (such as its appearance on the band's well known live album of their 1996 performance at the Royal Albert Hall, where it closed the main set.) The song "Day Has Come" would be completely re-arranged for future live performance. "The Oak" has continued to be played live amongst other songs on the album, including the traditional "Blue Cockade".

== Background ==
Show of Hands, a duo of Devonian folk musicians Steve Knightley and Phil Beer, formed in 1987. The musicians had known each other for a long time. Their first recorded collaboration featured on Beer's first live album with Paul Downes, 1980's Live in Concept. Show of Hands formed whilst Beer was a member of The Albion Band. The duo's first album, Show of Hands, was released on cassette in 1987, followed by Tall Ships in 1990.

Later on in 1990, Beer left The Albion Band, letting Show of Hands become a full musical partnership, recording another cassette album, Out for the Count in The Old Court in 1991. This was their last cassette album, and marked a hiatus for the duo as they formed the band Alianza with Dave Townshend with three Chilean musicians, exploring world music. For Alianza's only album, released in 1992 on the record label Road Goes on Forever, Knightley wrote tracks Show of Hands would later perform, such as "Santiago", as well as re-recording an older Show of Hands track, "Tall Ships". The band disbanded and the duo returned to performing as Show of Hands. Featuring a contribution from Beer's earlier collaborator Paul Downes, a live performance from the duo from 8 June 1992 at Bridport's Bull Hotel was released on The Road Goes on Forever in 1992 as Show of Hands Live, produced by Mike Trim, and their first album released on CD. Trim's work for the album inspired the duo's next project; on TWAH! Records, the duo prepared for Beat About the Bush, their first CD studio album. Their only studio work in 1993 was the Columbus EP, but the duo would return to the studio to record the new album with Trim in January 1994.

== Music ==
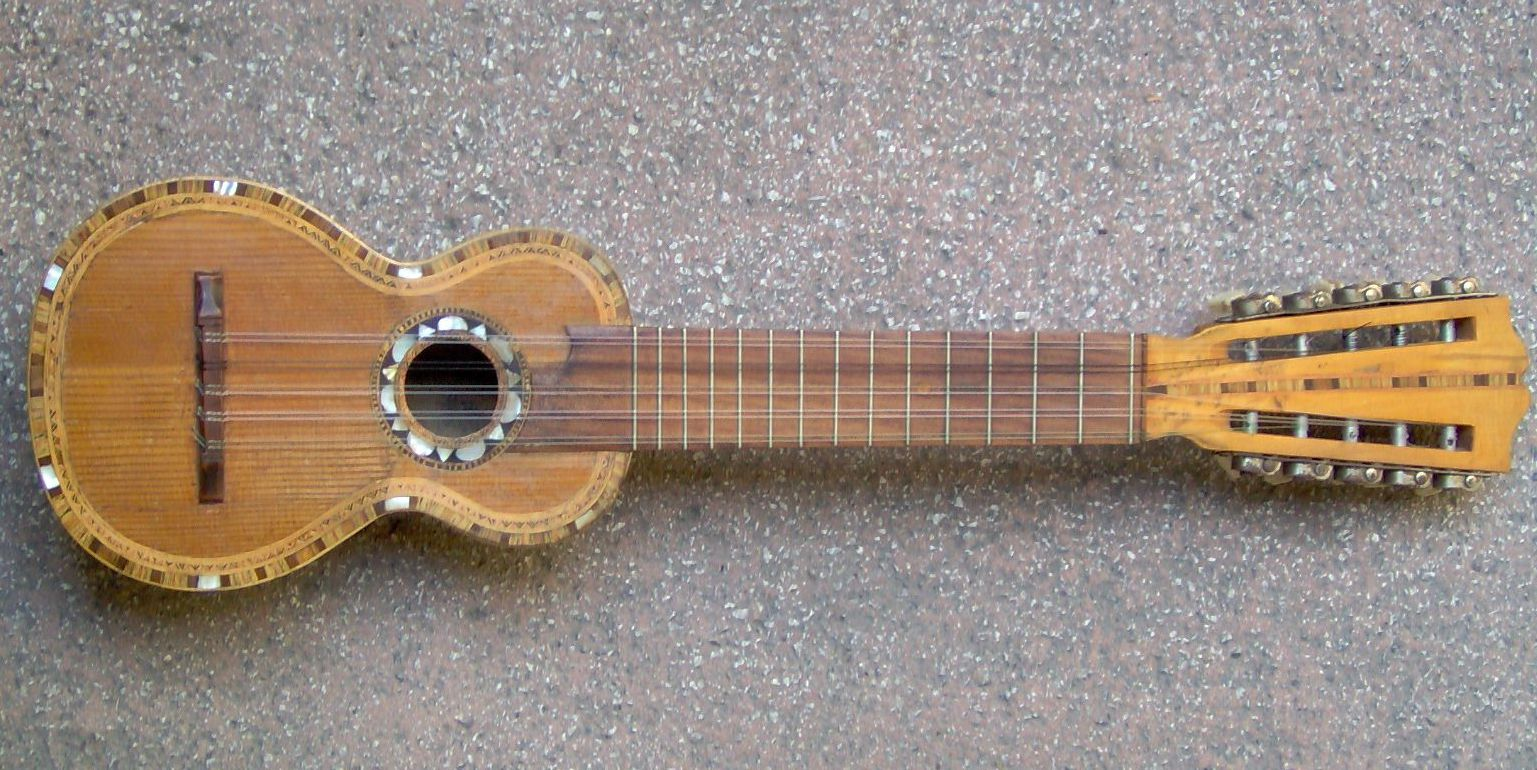
Guest musician Vladimir Vega plays two Andean instruments on the album, including the charango (pictured)

Mike Trim's successful recording engineer work on Show of Hands Live lead to his and the duo's joint vision on Beat About the Bush to produce an elusive "radio friendly" folk/roots album that retained the band's live sound whilst adding a rhythm section. The duo had not experimented with a rhythm section before. Knightley sings and plays acoustic guitar, whilst Beer plays fiddle, mandolin, viola, slide guitar and melodeon on the album and has been credited for being responsible "for a lot of the unseen hard work involved in the development of the material's arrangements." The album also features various guest musicians; Knightley later commented that "lots of friends were drafted for the sessions". The album was recorded in January 1994 at Wytherston Studios, West Dorset.

Nine of the songs are compositions by Knightley, these songs are commentaries on life and lifestyles, some with "the undercurrent of secondary story lines or oblique points, drawn out by a subtle shift of view." Living Tradition noted "Cars" pulls listeners "into this song, berating traffic congestion and the sheer number of vehicles, and are then faced with the questions, "Does anybody walk here? Or anywhere?"." The same publication noted "Class of Seventy Three", "Shadows in the Dark", "Day Has Come" and "The Hook of Love" with their "strong lyrics and melody lines, work well with their given arrangements, variations on folk leaning towards low key, soft rock", comparing the songs to Dolores Keane, Mary Black and Bonnie Raitt. "The Galway Farmer", one of the duo's better known songs, is about an Irishman betting on a horse at a race at Cheltenham Racecourse and winning, despite being ridiculed beforehand. Knightley, who was a part-time teacher, noticed the job's unusual impact on the song, commenting "I taught part time for about four years but I think the impact on the songs was a bit of rigour when it came to facts and figures. I like to know my history and geography. Even when I wrote ["The Galway Farmer"]. I like to know the odds and I like to know the number of jumps." The song has been played live many times by the band. Many of the songs have been re-arranged for live performances, including most notably "Day Has Come", whose musical structure was re-arranged for their 1996 performance at the Royal Albert Hall and further performances of the song. The album also includes four traditional performances.

== Album cover and title ==
The album cover features a photograph of the duo holding up musical instruments covering their faces, photographed by George Wright. In 2007, Steve Knightley recalled of the cover shoot that "after one boozy late night with Ralph McTell, [the duo] were in no state to face the cameras for the CD cover shot the next day. The suggestion to cover [the duo]'s faces with instruments came from George Wright, the photographer and save the world from a sorry spectacle." Visual Image are credited for the sleeve design, whilst Paulyn de Fresnes created the serif titling on the cover. The title of the album, Beat About the Bush, is an English phrase meaning "to prevaricate and avoid coming to the point." The phrase is old and first appeared in the mediaeval poem "Generydes - A Romance in Seven-line Stanzas", circa 1440.

== Release and reception ==
"If you’ve ever been to Cheltenham Racecourse in November, mingled, mixed and shared a drink with our Irish brethren, this song is for you. A Galway farmer crosses the Irish Sea in search of lady luck. He places a £2000 bet on Galway Bay, a 20-1 outsider. Knightley sets up the horse racing spectacle. Show of Hands ramp up the pace and volume as they take us over fences, stumbles, rattling hoofs, misguided choice of horse, then the last furlongs and final sprint. Beer on violin drives the race on and on at an electrifying tempo, as the audience stamp, clap, holler for Galway Bay to hit the finish line first. Pure theatre, excitement and enjoyment is encapsulated in one song."

— Owen Peters of Penny Black Music referring to "The Galway Farmer".

Beat about the Bush was released by Twah! Records on 19 February 1994. Peter Fairbairn of The Living Tradition's review of the album concluded that "the duo work well together and with this mix of their own material plus a fine set of tunes and a couple of traditional songs including a soulful version of "Blue Cockade", Beat About the Bush should appeal to a large and varied range of tastes."

Knightley noted in 2007 that despite Trim's "best efforts" to achieve a radio-friendly sound, "radio reaction was minimal", and as such, another ten years were to pass before the duo "dipped [their] toes once more into the world of bass and percussion", the latter part referring to their 2006 album Witness. During the supporting tour of Beat about the Bush that followed its release, the band met engineer-producer Gerard O'Farrell, whom they hired for their live performances, and he became Show of Hands' manager within the year, producing the duo's subsequent album Lie of the Land in July 1995. It was also following the release of Beat about the Bush that Knightley gave up his job of being a part-time teacher.

The band left TWAH! Records following the album's original release and signed with Isis Records for the band's follow-up album, Lie of the Land, in 1995, which, partly thanks to producer Gerard O'Farrell, features a simpler folk sound than Beat about the Bush. The duo then in 1996 established their own record label, Hands on Music, who have released all of the band's subsequent albums. Twah! Records re-released Beat about the Bush in Germany in 1997, whilst the duo's own label Hands on Music also re-released the album in the UK and worldwide in 1999, alongside Show of Hands Live and Lie of the Lands, as both had been out of print following the disbandment of both Twah! Records and Isis Records.

As the band's prior three, cassette-only albums had been out of print prior to the release of Beat About the Bush, a compilation of several songs from them was released in 1995 as Backlog 1987 –1991. As those original albums still remain out of print, Beat About the Bush is sometimes seen as the duo's debut album. The song "The Galway Farmer" was featured on the 2000 compilation The Best of British Folk.

== Track listing ==
All songs written by Steve Knightley, except where noted.

1. "Beat about the Bush" – 4:41
2. "The Class of Seventy Three" – 3:09
3. "Armadas" – 4:31
4. "Nine Hundred Miles" (Trad) / "Poor Wayfaring Stranger" (Trad) – 4:19
5. "Shadows in the Dark" – 3:51
6. "The Galway Farmer" – 5:48
7. "White Tribes" (Knightley/Matt Clifford) – 2:38
8. "Day Has Come" – 4:39
9. "The Hook of Love" – 4:18
10. "Cars" – 3:55
11. "The Blue Cockade" (Trad) – 6:11
12. "Mr May’s" (Phil Beer) / "Gloucester Hornpipe" (Trad) – 4:06
13. "The Oak" – 3:07

== Personnel ==
- Steve Knightley – vocals, acoustic guitar, cuatro, mandocello, tenor guitar
- Phil Beer – vocals, acoustic guitar, fiddle, mandocello, mandolin, melodeon, slide guitar, Spanish guitar, viola
- Cormac Byrne – bodhran, cajon, percussion
- Biddy Blyth – flute, harp, whistle
- Matt Clifford – piano
- Nick France – drums, tea tray
- Stefean Hannigan – bodhran, uilleann pipes
- Ralph McTell – vocals, mouth harp
- Mike Trim — vocals, acoustic bass guitar, percussion
- Vladimir Vega – vocals, charango, zamponas
- Pete Zorn – acoustic bass guitar, electric bass guitar, saxophone
