= The Path (Show of Hands album) =

Studio album by Show of Hands
- Released: 14 April 2003
- Recorded: 2003
- Genre: Folk; instrumental; ambient
- Length: 45:47
- Label: Hands on Music HMCD18
- Producer: Show Of Hands; Matt Clifford; Mick Dolan

Show of Hands chronology
Cold Cuts (2002)	The Path (2003)	Country Life (2003)

The Path is the tenth studio album by English acoustic roots duo Show of Hands, released in April 2003. The album was conceived as an "instrumental journey" around the South West Coast Path, a 630-mile coastline path opened in 1978 in the duo's native West Country, and a celebration of the coastline's "sights and sounds". It is the band's only completely instrumental album, with each of its songs named after and inspired by different locations on the path. It was a project between Show Of Hands and The South West Coast Path Team, as part of the latter's celebrations for the silver jubilee (25th anniversary) of the path. As such the album is endorsed by various organisations who own different parts of the path, namely The Countryside Agency, The National Trust and English Heritage Commission,.and the music is ambient instrumentals inspired by different locations around the coastline.

The duo hoped that, with the album, listeners would be inspired to discover or rediscover the "endless fascination" of the coast path. The album was released on 14 April 2003 by the duo's own label Hands on Music, a month before they released their following album Country Life. In July 2012, music from The Path featured in several themed videos on a new interactive official website for the South West Coast Path, which attracts some 400,000 hits a year. One track from the album, "Port Isaac", featured on their compilation album Roots: The Best of Show of Hands (2007).

== Background ==
Show of Hands entered the 2000s by recording an album of cover versions, Covers (2000), which presented a stripped down sound with no overdubs or multitracking. They followed this their second concert at the Royal Albert Hall which was filmed for their VHS concert film The Big Gig (2001), which itself was followed by their ninth studio album, Cold Frontier (2001), which was co-produced between the duo and Mick Dolan, engineer for Steve Winwood. Critical praise greeted both releases, and the duo embarked on The Cold Frontier Tour in November 2001, where they played a great deal of unreleased or "rare" material. The band's live album Cold Cuts (2002), which was drawn from material from the tour, was released to positive reviews. The duo began writing for what they planned to be their next album.

The logo of The National Trust, who own some of the path and whose logo features on the album.

Meanwhile, The Countryside Agency were looking to celebrate the silver jubilee (25th anniversary) of the South West Coast Path, a National Trail that remains the longest waymarked long-distance footpath (and one of the longest in the UK). It stretches for 630 miles (1,014 km), running from Minehead in Somerset, along the coasts of Devon and Cornwall, to Poole Harbour in Dorset. It is also one of the more challenging trails as it rises and falls with every river mouth, and its total height climbed has been calculated to be 114,931 ft (35,031 m), almost four times the height of Mount Everest. It has been voted "Britain's Best Walking Route" twice in a row by readers of the Ramblers Walk magazine, and regularly features in lists of the world's best walks.

The South West Coast Path Association formed in 1973, and after being constructed over five years, the path was opened in 1978. To celebrate the silver jubilee of the association in 1998, they set up a fund to raise money for markers at Minehead and South Haven Point, and erected "Path Markers" on the path at Minehead in 2001 and South Haven Point in 2002. To celebrate the silver jubilee of the path's opening, Show of Hands, who had begun work on their tenth album Country Life, were asked by The South West Coast Path Association to create an album of music celebrating the path and the sites that it visits. Show of Hands are from Devon, the only English county to have two coastlines, and the South West Coast Path crosses both of them. As such, it became a local project for the duo. The duo changed their focus from Country Life to the album concerning the coast path's silver jubilee. As different parts of the path are owned by different charities and organisations, namely The National Trust, English Heritage and The Countryside Agency, the album would also be endorsed by those organisations. The duo named the album simply The Path, after the path.

== Music ==
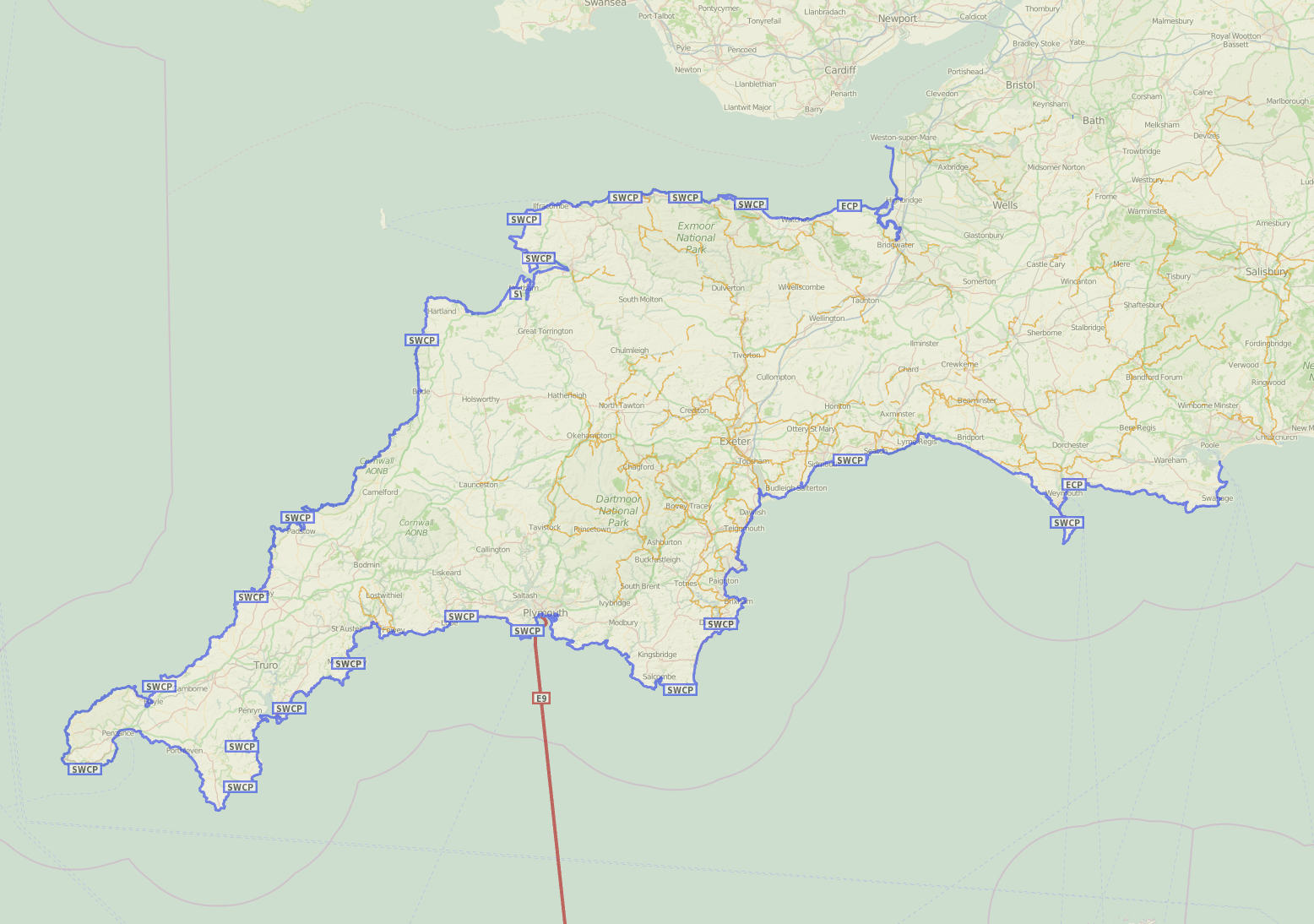
A map of the South West Coast Path.

Unlike the band's previous albums, which feature songs, The Path is completely instrumental, and to date remains their only completely instrumental album. The album is set up as an "instrumental journey" around the coast path, and a celebration of the path's "sights and sounds". Each of the album's sixteen tracks is named after a specific location on the path's track. As such, the album is seen as a concept album. The duo's website states that the album "creates an atmospheric musical portrait of the sea, and the seaside". Whilst the album is folk music, it has also been described as an ambient album. Describing the coast path, the duo noted that "the full 630 mile adventure around the coastline of the southwest peninsula has now become the region's most popular attraction. From the Exmoor National Park to Poole harbour there is no better way to enjoy our dramatic coastline, its wildlife, history and culture," and the duo hoped that, with the album, listeners would be inspired to discover - or rediscover its "endless fascination".

The album is co-produced between Show of Hands, Matt Clifford and Mick Dolan, and all producers wrote music featured on the album, making this a departure from most of the duo's previous albums, which were predominately written by Steve Knightley of the duo. Several of the tracks are instrumental reworkings of older material. Knightley wrote the album's first track, "Foreland Point", whilst the second track, "Braunton Burrows", is adapted from a track from Beer's sporadic collaborator Paul Downes, whilst his composition "Lamorna Cave" was also recorded for the seventh track. Matt Clifford wrote the third track, "Buck's Mills". The fourth track, "Port Isaac", is essentially an instrumental reworking of the duo's earlier song "Cousin Jack", about miners of the Cornish diaspora departing from Port Isaac, which featured on their sixth studio album Dark Fields (1997). The final, sixteenth track, "The Foreland – Reprise", is a reworking of the album's first track, "Foreland Point".

Phil Beer of the duo had previously released the collaborative album Ridgeriders in 1999, a soundtrack to the ITV Meridian television series of the same name presented by Nick Knowles which featured Knowles visiting the ancient trackways of Southern England on a motorcycle. The album, a collaboration between Ashley Hutchings, Chris While, The Albion Band and Julie Matthews, was also a "journey" concept album featuring sixteen songs mostly set in different locations in Southern England, with some of the songs named after the locations, making it similar in some sense to The Path. Ridgeriders was released in June 1999 to positive reviews, including one from Living Tradition who said "interesting concept album with enough interest for those who never saw the series, but for those readers north of the Border, it is very English in feel."

== Release and legacy ==
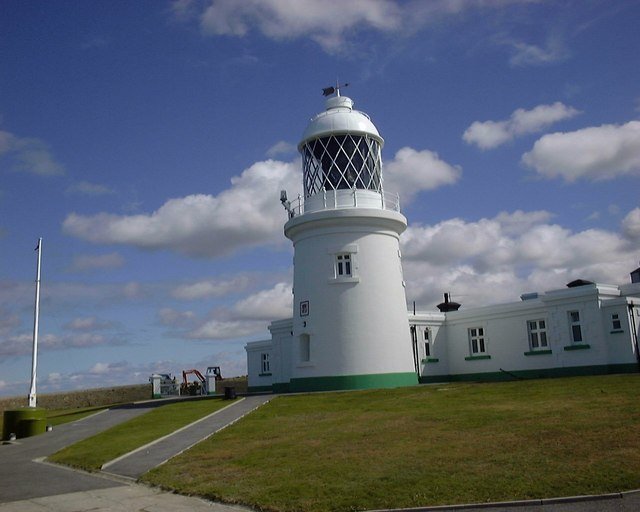
Pendeen Lighthouse (pictured in 2002) features on the album cover.

The Path was released on 14 April 2003 on Compact Disc by the duo's own record label Hands on Music with the catalogue number HMCD18. The album cover features a photograph of Pendeen Lighthouse, which is visited on the path, by Graham Norways. The back cover features the logos for The National Trust, English Heritage and The Countryside Agency. The duo explained that this was because the coast path is mostly funded by The Countryside Agency, whilst a third of the land the path crosses is owned by The National Trust, whilst Pendennis Castle, visited in the path and the name of one of the track's on the album, is within the ownership of English Heritage. The disc face features a map of the coast path. The album was not reviewed by any publications, perhaps due to its low-key release.

After the album's release, the duo returned to work on Country Life, which was released in October 2003. Country Life ironically features a greater focus on rural issues, most notably on its first song, "Country Life", a "stirring" and "finely honed rant about the desecration of British country life" It was packaged with a bonus disc which contained CD-ROM bonus material, including a lyrics section set to "The Exe Estuary" from The Path. The same track was also performed live by Knightley in an acoustic variation for his BBC Radio 4 documentary Open Country in 2010. In July 2012, music from The Path featured in several themed videos on a new interactive official website for the South West Coast Path, which attracts some 400,000 hits a year. One track from the album, "Port Isaac", features on their "best of" compilation album Roots: The Best of Show of Hands (2007). It features on the second disc, subtitled Longdogs, whose tracks were chosen by asking members of the duo's internet forum Longdogs to choose their favourite track from each of their albums via a poll.

== Track listing ==
1. "Foreland Point" (Steve Knightley) – 4:09
2. "Braunton Burrows" (Paul Downes) – 2:27
3. "Buck's Mills" (Matt Clifford) – 2:31
4. "Port Isaac" (Knightley) – 4:29
5. "Carbis Bay" (Phil Beer – 2:46
6. "Land's End" (Knightley) – 3:13
7. "Lamorna Cave" (Downes) – 3:08
8. "Pendennis Castle" (Beer) – 2:27
9. "Charlestown" (Clifford) – 1:46
10. "Rame Head" (Knightley) – 3:32
11. "Hallsands" (Clifford) – 2:31
12. "Paignton" (Knightley) – 1:28
13. "The Exe Estuary" (Knightley) – 3:11
14. "Lyme Regis" (Beer) – 1:18
15. "Golden Cap" (Knightley/Beer) – 4:56
16. "The Foreland - Reprise" (Knightley) – 1:29

== See also ==
- South West Coast Path
- Ridgeriders – a 1999 collaboration album featuring Beer of Show of Hands with a similar concept concerning a journey in the West Country.
- Hands on Music
- South West Coast Path Association
- The Countryside Agency
- English Heritage
