= Ridgeriders =

1999 studio album

Studio album by Phil Beer, Ashley Hutchings and Chris While with The Albion Band and Julie Matthews.
- Released: September 1999; 25 June 2001
- Recorded: 1999; January 1995 ("Close Your Eyes")
- Studios: Tone Deaf Studios, Preston, and Central Studios, Southport
- Genres: Folk; English folk
- Length: 41:31
- Labels: Blueprint records / HTD Records / Talking Elephant

Phil Beer chronology
The Fiddle Collection (1999)	Ridgeriders (1999)	Mandorock (2000)

Ridgeriders is a 1999 studio album based on music from the TV series Ridge Riders. The album is a collaboration album between Phil Beer, Ashley Hutchings and Chris While. It also guest features The Albion Band and Julie Matthews.

The musicians later toured much of the album in January 2001, with one concert subsequently released as "Ridgeriders" In Concert in November 2001.

The album is a concept album, as it is a "journey" album that would be played on a journey around Southern England, making it similar to another of Beer's albums, Show of Hands' The Path.

Similar to Beer's older album The Works, the album's release is of question. Whilst the TV series began in 1994, the album was released in September 1999, and mostly recorded the same year in Preston and Southport. The album was re-released in June 2001 by Talking Elephant, who would release the aforementioned live album later that year.

"Close Your Eyes" was actually recorded in 1995, and appeared on The Albion Band's album Albion Heart that year.

== Critical reception ==
Professional ratings
Review scores
Source	Rating
The Living Tradition	(favourable)

In their positive review, Living Tradition said the album is an "interesting concept album with enough interest for those who never saw the series, but for those readers north of the Border, it is very English in feel."

== Album track listing ==
1. "Shapes of the Landscape" - 2:22
2. "The Work of the Devil" - 2:10
3. "Along the Downs" - 2:29
4. "The Drover's Song" - 2:03
5. "Turnpike Reel" - 2:24
6. "Close Your Eyes" - 3:11
7. "Low Southern Slopes" - 1:54
8. "What Celia Sees" - 2:43
9. "Never Without a Thief or Twain" - 2:12
10. "Along the Pilgrim's Way" - 3:58
11. "Michael Morey's Hump" - 1:58
12. "Mossing We'll Go" - 2:43
13. "Up on the Ridgeway" - 2:24
14. "Smuggler's Road" - 2:58
15. "Betteshanger Treasure" - 2:39
16. "Dorset Cursus" - 3:41

== Personnel ==
- Phil Beer - vocals, acoustic guitar, slide guitar, mandocello, fiddle, mandolin
- Chris While - vocals, acoustic guitar
- Ashley Hutchings - vocals, acoustic bass, electric bass

with

- Joe Broughton - fiddle, mandolin
- Neil Marshall - drums, percussion
- Julie Matthews - keyboards, backing vocals
- Ken Nicol - acoustic guitar, electric guitar, backing vocals
- Simon Nicol - acoustic guitar on "Close Your Eyes"

Technical

- Engineered by Ken Nicol except for tracks 1, 3, 10 & 12, engineered and mixed by Julie Matthews
- Executive producer: Ashley Hutchings
- Mastered by Andy Seward
- Photography by Jeff Wright

== "Ridgeriders" In Concert ==
"Ridgeriders" In Concert

Live album by Phil Beer, Ashley Hutchings and Chris While
- Released: 26 November 2001
- Recorded: January 2001
- Genre: Folk
- Label: Talking Elephant

Phil Beer chronology
Once in a Blue Moon (2001)	"Ridgeriders" In Concert (2001)	Beer and Sandland Live 2003 (2003)

"Ridgeriders" In Concert is a live album released in 2001. It was the first album by Phil Beer to be released on the Talking Elephant label.

=== Track listing ===
1. "Shapes of the Landscape" - 2:37
2. "Row of Pines" - 3:47
3. "The Cursus of Bignor" - 2:00
4. "Mossing We'll Go" - 3:05
5. "Tan Hill Fair" - 4:11
6. "All Seing Stour" - 3:42
7. "What Celia Sees" - 3:26
8. "Rosa" - 3:12
9. "I Am a Humble Bridge" - 3:28
10. "Close Your Eyes" - 2:54
11. "Robber's Roost" - 3:23
12. "Smuggler's Road" - 2:21
13. "Michael Morey's Hump" - 2:22
14. "To Be a Pilgrim" - 3:02
15. "Along the Pilgrim's Way" - 3:43
16. "Up the Crooked Spire/GeneralWard" - 5:09
17. "Ill Omens" - 5:39
18. "High and Wild Places" - 4:31
