= Dance Without Music =

Studio album by Downes & Beer
- Released: 1976
- Genre: Folk music; Celtic music
- Label: Sweet Folk and Country

Downes & Beer chronology
Life Ain't Worth Living (in the Old-Fashioned Way) (1973)	Dance Without Music (1976)

Dance Without Music is the second studio album by British musicians Paul Downes and Phil Beer, and their first under the shorter name of "Downes & Beer", released as a standard 33 rpm 10-track stereo vinyl in 1976 only. Colin Wilson contributes to the album.

It is highly scarce and few copies were pressed. One well known song from the album is "Let Me Play", as also featured on Live in Concept.

== Track listing ==
1. "Dance Without Music"
2. "The Song"
3. "Let Me Play"
4. "Somewhere in the Green"
5. "Sunday Supplement World"
6. "Five Poster Bed"
7. "Take Back Your Pictures"
8. "Flower Girl"
9. "To Be Born Again"
