= Life Ain't Worth Living (in the Old-Fashioned Way) =

Studio album by Paul Downes & Phil Beer
- Released: 1973
- Genre: Folk; Celtic; roots
- Label: Sweet Folk and Country

Paul Downes & Phil Beer chronology
Life Ain't Worth Living (in the Old-Fashioned Way) (1973)	Dance Without Music (1976)

Life Ain't Worth Living (subtitled (in the Old-Fashioned Way)) is the debut album by Downes and Beer, at the time known as simply "Paul Downes & Phil Beer", released in 1973 on stereo vinyl.

== Track listing ==
1. "Peggy and the Soldier"
2. "The Hunting of Arscott and Tetcott/Foxhunter's Jig"
3. "Bonny Bunch of Roses"
4. "Helen and Jan's Favourites"
5. "The Snow It Melts the Soonest"
6. "Banks of Newfoundland"
7. "Spanish Ladies"
8. "Low Down in the Broom"
9. "Marrow Bones"
10. "Macleod's Lament"
11. "Both Sexes"
12. "Tabhair Dom Da Lamh"
13. "Life Ain't Worth Living"
