= Country Life (Show of Hands album) =

Studio album by Show of Hands
- Released: 20 October 2003
- Recorded: Early 2003
- Studio: Riverside Studios, Exeter, Devon
- Genre: Folk; English folk
- Length: 55:31
- Label: Hands on Music
- Producer: Mick Dolan and Show of Hands

Show of Hands chronology
| The Path (2003) | Country Life (2003) | As You Were (2005) |

Country Life is the eleventh studio album by English acoustic roots duo Show of Hands. Released in 2003, it marks a departure for the band, with stronger socially and politically lyrics than the duo's previous albums, as well as showcasing the duo exploring a larger musical palette. Some of the album's lyrics concern rural issues which Knightley had taken to heart in previous years, including in the aftermath of their previous lyrical album Cold Frontier (2001). Prior to the release of Country Life, the duo had released an instrumental album named The Path. Both The Path and Country Life were released close together. The album was packaged in a lavish set which included a bonus disc of demo versions and other bonus material. The album's title track was also promoted by the band's first music video.

The album received a positive reception, with praise greeting the album from the likes of Tom Jewsbury of the BBC, Iain Hazlewood of Spiral Earth, and Jane Brace of The Living Tradition. The album ranked at number 22 in the "Devon's Top 50 Albums" poll organised by BBC Radio Devon in April 2004 to find the all-time favourite albums of Devonians. The duo toured in support of the album from 2003–2005.

== Background and recording ==
After completing and releasing their eighth studio album Cold Frontier (2001), Show of Hands embarked on a nationwide tour in which they played a great deal of unreleased or "rare" material. The band's live album Cold Cuts (2002) was drawn from material from the tour. The tour coincided with the start of writing material for the album. Both the recording of Cold Frontier and the subsequent tour were in an era of several social and political concerns for Knightley, culminating in the more "heavy" lyrics that landed on the album. With a focus on rural issues, Steve Knightley of the duo named the album Country Life. The duo had been commissioned by the National Trust and English Heritage to record an instrumental album to commemorate the 25th anniversary of the South West Coast Path. The resulting album, The Path (2003), was quickly recorded as the duo were preparing for their next canonical album. As such, the duo entered a busy in period in which they were working on two albums. The Path was released on 14 April 2003, by which point Country Life had been recorded at Riverside Studios in Exeter in the early part of 2003. The album was co-produced between Mick Dolan and the duo.

== Music and composition ==
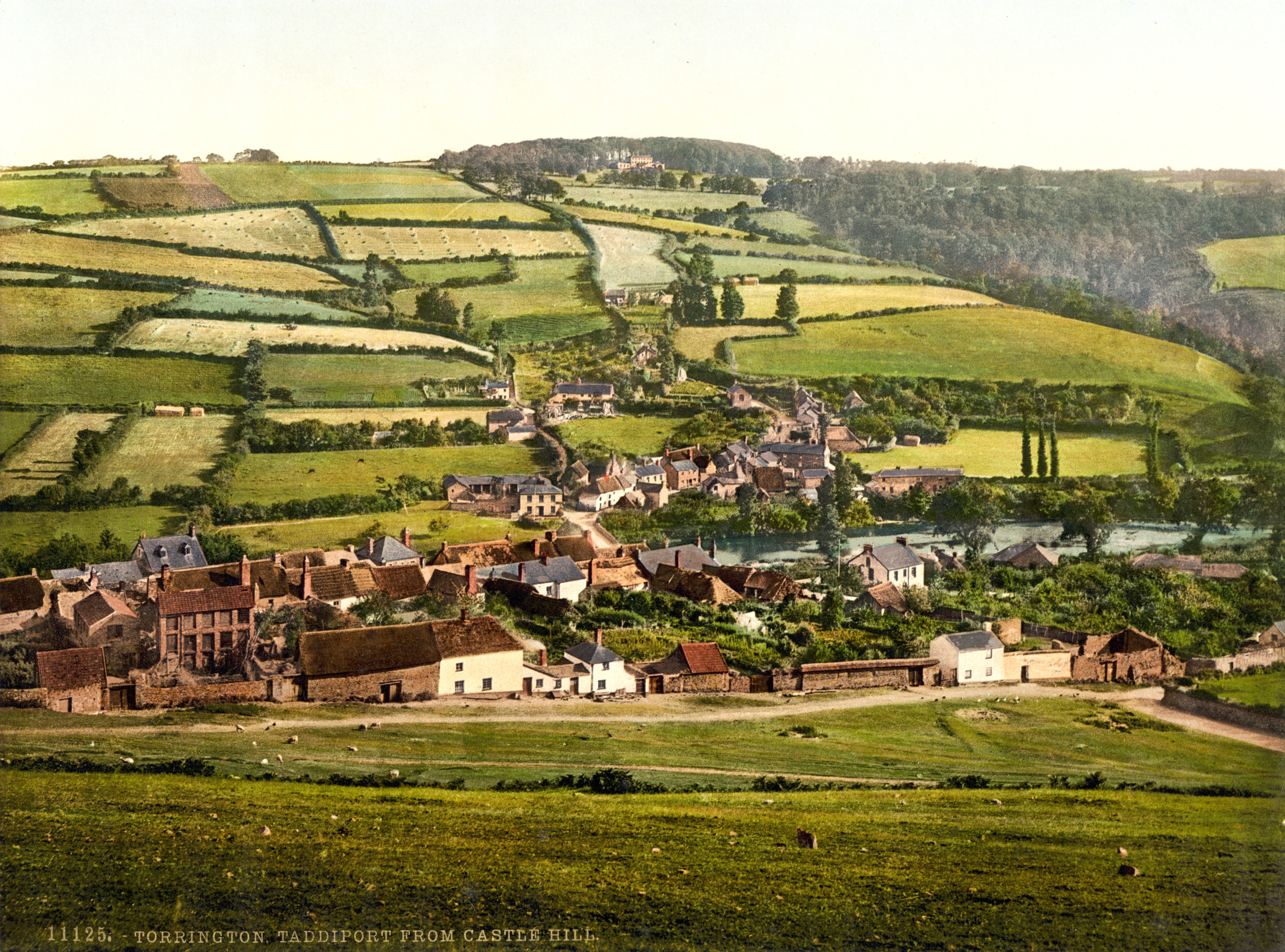
The album's title song is about the desecration of British country life.

At the time of release, Jane Brace of Living Tradition described Country Life as the duo's "most ambitious, exciting and keenly awaited project to date". Iain Hazlewood of Spiral Earth noted "the diversity of musical style, mood and pace on the album is always held in control; as an album it is totally cohesive - nothing unbalances it," and noted the album incorporates elements of Celtic, Spanish, South American, rock and blues, but also that despite this, "they don't fall into the trap of creating 'world' music that isn't rooted to any real place or time. Their place is the West Country and South West of England, their time is anytime they damn well like." Tom Jewsbury of the BBC said the duo "steer ever closer to the mainstream market with this latest studio album. All the usual SOH ingredients are present: soulful vocals, accomplished instrumentation, excellent production, original compositions featuring politically-charged lyrics, the occasional nod to the tradition."

The album contains ten songs written by Steve Knightley, as well as the duo's arrangements of two traditional folk songs and Kelly Joe Phelps's "Tommy", the latter being a "raw tale of schizophrenia" about "a misfit" and featuring Phil Beer's "unusual voice". The title track and album opener, "Country Life", is a "stirring" and "finely honed rant about the desecration of British country life" and "an acerbic indictment of modern values". Inspired by the 2001 United Kingdom foot-and-mouth outbreak, it became something of a break-through recording for the band that has brought their work to a wider audience. The song examines rural poverty and social exclusion from the experiences of an extended family, and was partly born from Knightley's frustration that English rural areas lacked a meaningful musical voice. Steve Knightley had commented that “cities in England have got their voices … The only countryside music bordered on a joke, like the Wurzels." Nonetheless, Knightley does not claim to speak for rural people or to be presenting an "authentic‟ rural voice, with the story told by the particular character of an angry young man.

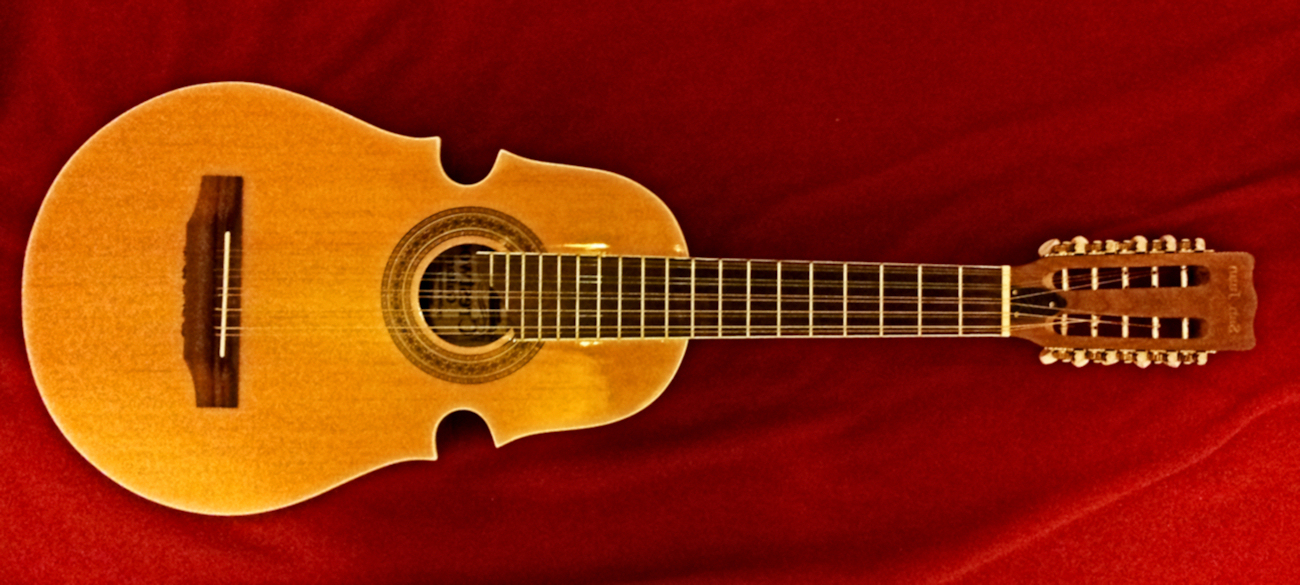
"Reynardine" features Knightley's finger percussion on a cuatro.

The album's mood changes quickly on the second track, "Hard Shoulder", a song about a long-standing friendship. The song was described as "soaked through with the poignancy of hindsight and memory." "Hard Shoulder" is followed by "Suntrap", featuring Spanish guitar playing from Beer, and the poignant and gentle "Smile She Said", which tells of the journey of a relationship in five "exposures". Following this is the traditional song "Reynardine" which music written by Knightley. The song also features Knightley's hallmark finger drumming, this time on the cuatro, which he was taught by exiled Chilean musician Vladamir Vega during their time in Alianza in 1991. The track an unusual pulsating treatment. Knightley's singing on the ballad "Seven Days" is accompanied by young West Country singer Jenna Witts, with whom Knightley and Seth Lakeman recorded the album Western Approaches with the following year. Following the aforementioned cover of "Tommy" are the "jaunty" song "Be Lucky", the traditional folk song "Adieu Sweet Lovely Nancy" which again features Beer on vocals, and had originally been recorded by the duo with Alianza in 1991, and the "gentle" song "I Promise You". Before the album closer "Don't Be a Stranger", which was a former concert closer for the duo, is the upbeat "Red Diesel", about Terry, "the kind of guy that modern society doesn't really have much time for". The track features Knightley's mandocello and Beer's mandolin forming a "foot tapping" rhythm. Terry is a minor criminal who complains that "there ought to be a law for keeping out the yuppies and the grockles".

== Release and reception ==
Professional ratings
Review scores
| Source | Rating |
|---|---|
| BBC | (favourable) |
| The Living Tradition | (favourable) |
| NetRhythms | (favourable) |
| Spiral Earth | (favourable) |

Country Life was commercially released 20 October 2003 on the band's own label Hands on Music with the catalogue number HMCD19, but had already been sold at the duo's concerts since the middle of the year. The album was released as a double disc set, with the album on the first disc (subtitled The Album), and a bonus disc entitled The Demos, which contained demo versions of the album's songs "Country Life", "Hard Shoulder" and "I Promise You". The bonus disc also contained other CD-ROM bonus material, namely the music videos for "Country Life" and their older song "The Train", a photo slideshow set to "I Promise You", a lyrics section set to "The Exe Estuary" from their previous album The Path, live footage from their 2001 performance at the Royal Albert Hall and a downloadable screensaver. The bonus disc prompted the BBC to say the album was "lavishly packaged". Although no singles were released from the album, the title track had a music video produced for it.

Helped to be promoted by a tour in 2003, including a performance at the Trowbridge Village Pump Festival where copies of the album were signed, the album was released to a positive critical reception. Tom Jewsbury of the BBC said the album would "have SOH's mighty fan base in seventh heaven." Iain Hazlewood of Spiral Earth said that "Country Life is one of their defining moments" and "a deceptively complex album, repeated listening reveals a musical and emotional depth that just picks you up and runs off with your imagination. Jane Brace of The Living Tradition said she had "racked [her] brains for a way to describe this band and failed. And therein lies the 'riddle' of Show of Hands. Just when you think you've got a handle on them and decided it's 'acoustic with attitude' or out and out English folk they'll throw in some rock, shades of country, a reel of Celtic, a bit of bluegrass and then recreate the sitar sounds of India in the blink of an eye. They are without a doubt the coolest chameleons I've seen. and the release of Country Life proves they just get better and better. David Kidman of NetRhythms said the album is "another excellent product all round. Probably Show Of Hands' best". He commented that the album "gives us the best of all of SOH's various worlds." Bradley Torreano of Allmusic later noted that the album "was well-received by plaudits and fans alike."

In April 2004, less than a year after the album's release, it was ranked at number 22 in the "Devon's Top 50 Albums" online poll organised by BBC Radio Devon which listed the all-time favourite albums of participating Devonians. The album was the only album on the list by a Devonian artist, and its inclusion surprised Nick Southall of Stylus Magazine, who had not heard of the duo. Touring the album throughout 2003−2005, they won the BBC Radio 2 Folk Award for Best Live Act in 2004. The award was decided by a public vote. Singer and double bass player Miranda Sykes joined them on their Autumn Tour 2004, which spawned the live album As You Were (2005). The title track of Country Life has continued to be played live by the band, it was nominated for "Best Original Song" at the BBC Radio 2 Folk Awards 2005, and featured on the corresponding compilation album. The song became something of a breakthrough recording for the band, bringing them a wider audience. Three songs from the album appear on the band's best-of retrospective compilation album Roots: The Best of Show of Hands (2007), namely "Country Life", "Hard Shoulder and "Cold Frontier".

== Track listing ==
All songs written by Steve Knightley, except where noted.

1. "Country Life" – 3:58
2. "Hard Shoulder" – 5:17
3. "Suntrap" – 3:31
4. "Smile She Said" – 3:52
5. "Reynardine" (lyrics Trad.) – 3:55
6. "Seven Days" (Knightley/Jenna Witts) – 4:05
7. "Tommy" (Kelly Joe Phelps) – 5:39
8. "Be Lucky" – 5:08
9. "Drake" – 3:13
10. "I Promise You" – 3:54
11. "Adieu, Sweet Lovely Nancy" (Trad arr. Knightley/Phil Beer) – 4:08
12. "Red Diesel" – 3:35
13. "Don't Be A Stranger" – 5:10

Many copies come with a bonus 'promo disc' which features demo versions to three of the songs on the album.

1. "Country Life"
2. "Hard Shoulder"
3. "I Promise You"

== Personnel ==
- Steve Knightley - vocals, mandocello, bass guitar, concertina, cuatro, guitar
- Phil Beer - vocals, cuatro, fiddle, guitar, mandocello, melodeon, percussion, slide guitar, Spanish guitar
- Matt Clifford - keyboards, piano
- Mick Dolan - shaker, vocals
- Jenna Witts - vocals, piano
- Paul Wilson - melodeon (track 1)
- Roy Martin - drums (track 1)
- Brian Dickenson - harmonica (track 1)
- Mike "the landlord" Burch - harmonica (track 10)
