= Phil Beer =

English musician

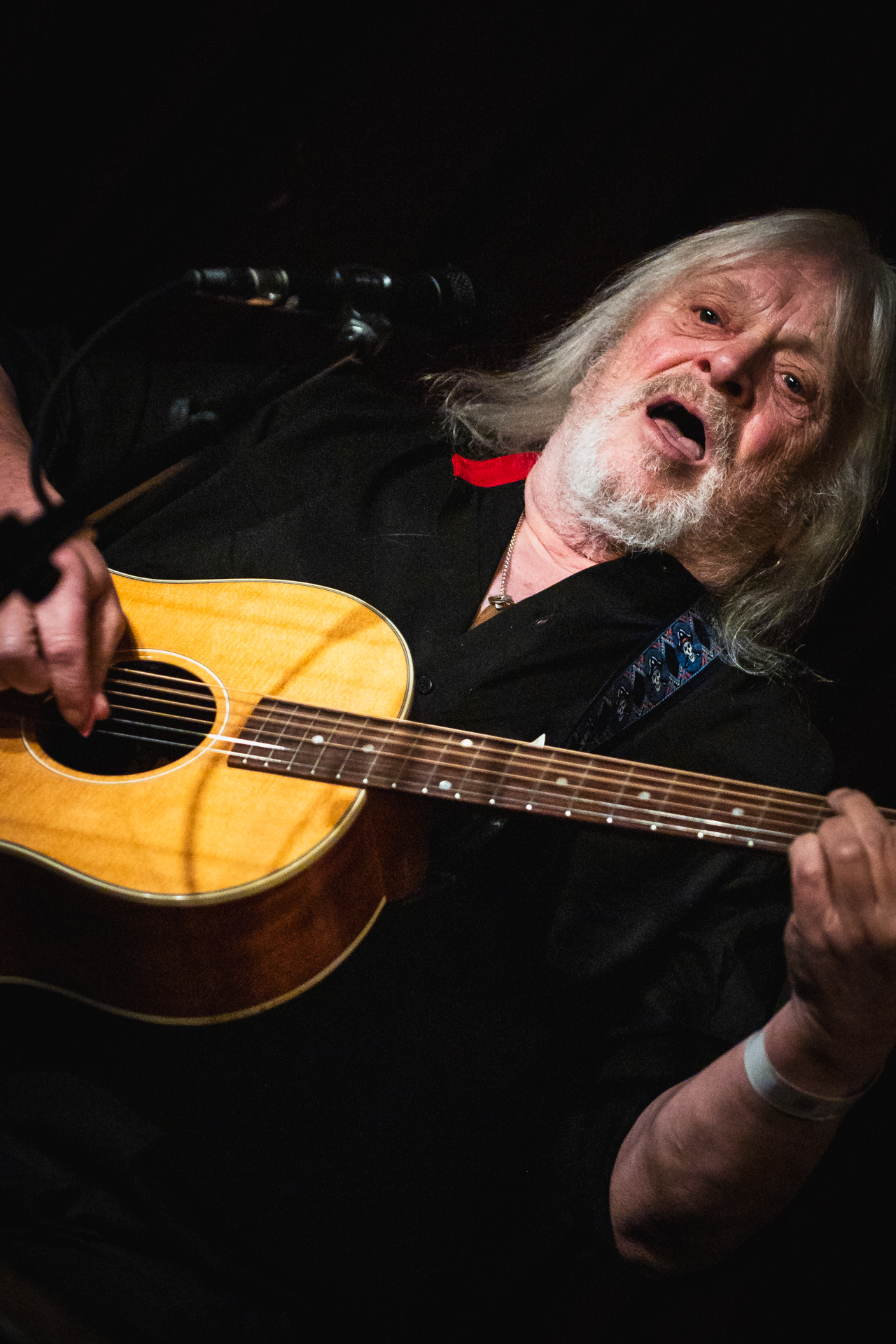
- Beer in 2025

Background information
- Born: 12 May 1953 (age 73); Exminster, Devon, England
- Genres: Folk, roots
- Occupations: Musician, songwriter, composer, producer
- Instruments: Vocals, Guitar, Fiddle, Mandolin, Cuatro, Slide Guitar, Spanish Guitar, Tenor Guitar, Mandocello, Viola
- Years active: 1968–present
- Labels: Hands On, Chudleighroots, Talking Elephant
- Website: philbeer.co.uk

Phil Beer (born 12 May 1953) is an English multi-instrumentalist, composer, producer, and one half of English acoustic roots duo Show of Hands.

== Biography ==
Beer first began to play fiddle, guitar, and mandolin whilst still at school in Teignmouth, Devon. This passion for acoustic music was especially influenced by the Davey Graham album Folk, Blues and Beyond. He played his first gig when he was fourteen in a band called Retrospect with Richard Entwistle, John Allman and Martin Pike and other musicians, and by the time he was sixteen he was performing regularly. Beer worked with Paul Downes as a duo from 1974 and also in the Arizona Smoke Revue 1980. He was a key member of Johnny Coppin's band (ex-Decameron), and together they collaborated with Nigel Mazlyn Jones on his 1979 Sentinel album. He toured with Mike Oldfield in 1979 and also recorded some tracks at Oldfield's Througham studio. Beer joined The Albion Band in 1984 and stayed with them until 1991, touring extensively at home and abroad, and recording many albums. Show of Hands became a full-time partnership from 1991. Beer continues to do session work, most notably on The Rolling Stones' Steel Wheels album, Steve Harley's Poetic Justice and countless other mainstream and less high-profile projects. Recent projects include two albums for folk fiddle player Jackie Oates, two albums for former Spinners singer Mick Groves, an album for folk musician Jez Lowe, an album for singer-songwriter Tom Palmer and an album for north Devon singer Jenna.

In 2015, Beer (alongside his fellow Show of Hands band members Steve Knightley and Miranda Sykes), was awarded an honorary doctorate of music from the University of Plymouth, to commemorate "great distinction in [their] professional lives".

=== Solo albums ===
Beer and frequent collaborator Paul Downes recorded Life Ain't Worth Living in 1973, followed by Dance Without Music in 1976. Shortly before his work with Mike Oldfield for Exposed, Beer released his first solo album in 1978/1979, Mandoline. His next primary solo album didn't come until 1994, Hard Hats. In 1998, his album The Works was released, apparently recorded in 1989 during his time with The Rolling Stones. In 1999, Phil Beer started a project in bringing together the UK's finest folk musicians which resulted in the album The Fiddle Collection. With The Phil Beer Band, the very scarce albums Mandorock and Once in a Blue Moon were released in 2000 and 2001 respectively. On the supporting Mandorock tour, the only commonly available Phil Beer Band album, Mandorock 2000 Live was recorded but not released until 2009. As Hard Hats and The Works were out of print by the 21st century, they were re-released together as Hard Works in 2000. In 2001, he and other former members of The Albion Band released an album called Ridgeriders, which was the soundtrack to a show about South Country tracks airing at the same time. They also toured for the album and this ended in the live album "Ridgeriders" In Concert. He and Deb Sandland also released a live album, Beer and Sandland Live 2003, in 2004. Phil's first proper solo album for some time was released in 2005, Rhythm Methodist. Phil compiled a career-spanning box set, Box Set One, released in 2010.

== Discography ==
- Mandoline (1978)
- Hard Hats (1994)
- The Works (1998)
- Ridgeriders (with Ashley Hutchings and Chris While) (1999)
- Mandorock (with the Phil Beer Band) (2000)
- Mandorock 2000 Live (with the Phil Beer Band) (2000)
- Once in a Blue Moon (2001)
- Phil Beer & Deb Sandland Live 2003 (2004)
- Rhythm Methodist (2004)
- Rhythm Methodist (re-release 2008) Talking Elephant Label.
- Hard Works (compilation of Hard Hats and The Works); 2008. Talking Elephant label.
- Box Set One (a five disc compilation of archive, live and new music and video); 2010
- Plays guitar and fiddle, sings a bit (2014)

=== With The Albion Band ===
- Under the Rose (1984)
- A Christmas Present from The Albion Band (1985)
- Yuletracks (1986) (not Albion Band in name, though almost all of its participants are from The Albion Band. Phil Beer appears on two songs)
- Stella Maris (1987)
- The Wild Side of Town (1987)
- I Got New Shoes (Albion Dance Band) (1988)
- Rockin' Barn Dance (recorded 1988, released 2009)
- Give Me a Saddle, I'll Trade You a Car (1989)
- 1990 (1990)
- Captured/The Unreleased Radio Tapes (1992/1994)

=== With The Band of Love ===
- Folk Fever (2018)

=== With Downes and Beer ===
- Life Ain't Worth Living (1973)
- Dance Without Music (1976)
- Live in Concept (1980)
- Live at Nettlebed (2008, Talking Elephant label)

=== With Johnny Coppin ===
- Roll On Dreamer (1978)
- No Going Back (1979)
- Get Lucky (1982)
- Forest and Vale and High Blue Hill (1983)
- Line of Blue (1985)
- English Morning (1987)
- Edge of Day (1989)
- West Country Christmas (1990)
- Force of the River (1993)
- The Winding Stair (2005)

=== With Show of Hands ===
- Show of Hands (1987)
- Tall Ships/Six O'Clock Waltz (1990)
- Out for the Count (1991)
- Show of Hands Live (1992)
- Beat about the Bush (1994)
- Lie of the Land (1995)
- Dark Fields (1997)
- Folk Music (1998)
- Backlog (1999)
- Show of Hands (2000)
- Covers (2000)
- Cold Frontier (2001)
- The Path (2003)
- Country Life (2003)
- Witness (2006)
- Roots – The Best of Show of Hands (2007)
- Arrogance Ignorance and Greed (2009)
- "Wake The Union" (2012)

== Awards ==
- 2010 BBC Radio 2 Folk Awards – Best Duo (with Steve Knightley)
- 2010 BBC Radio 2 Fold Awards – Best Song Arrogance, Ignorance and Greed
