= Paul Downes =

- Origin: Devon, England
- Genre: Folk
- Occupations: Singer, songwriter, composer, producer
- Instruments: Guitar, mandolin
- Years active: 1968—present
- Formerly of: Arizona Smoke Revue
- Website: pauldownes.co.uk

Paul Downes is an English folk guitarist, singer and composer. He has appeared on eight albums with bands, three solo albums and has over 150 session credits. He has toured every concert venue, theatre and festival in Britain, plus many tours in the US and Europe, as well as appearing in cabaret in the West Indies and newsreading on US radio.

== Biography ==
Born in Exeter, Devon, Downes played classical guitar in his youth. He played a solo recital in Westminster Abbey at the age of 16 and subsequently took up folk music. From the age of 12, his best friend was Steve Knightley; then at 16, they met Phil Beer. After giving up an academic career, he went on the road as half of the folk duo Downes and Beer.

The pair met Bill Zorn, who had just left The Kingston Trio, and formed the Arizona Smoke Revue. When Zorn returned to the states, Downes toured with Pete Seeger before being asked to sit in on the first Joyce Gang gig. The Joyce Gang are an Anglo/Irish roots band with whom Downes has recorded five albums. He still plays with the Joyce Gang and as a solo artist, as well as occasional reunions with Phil Beer and Arizona Smoke Revue.

Downes has recently formed a collaboration with Mick Ryan, several of whose songs he had previously recorded. Downes plays guitar for Ryan's folk opera The Navvy's Wife and they are toured as a duo in 2009.

He is a supporter of Exeter Chiefs.

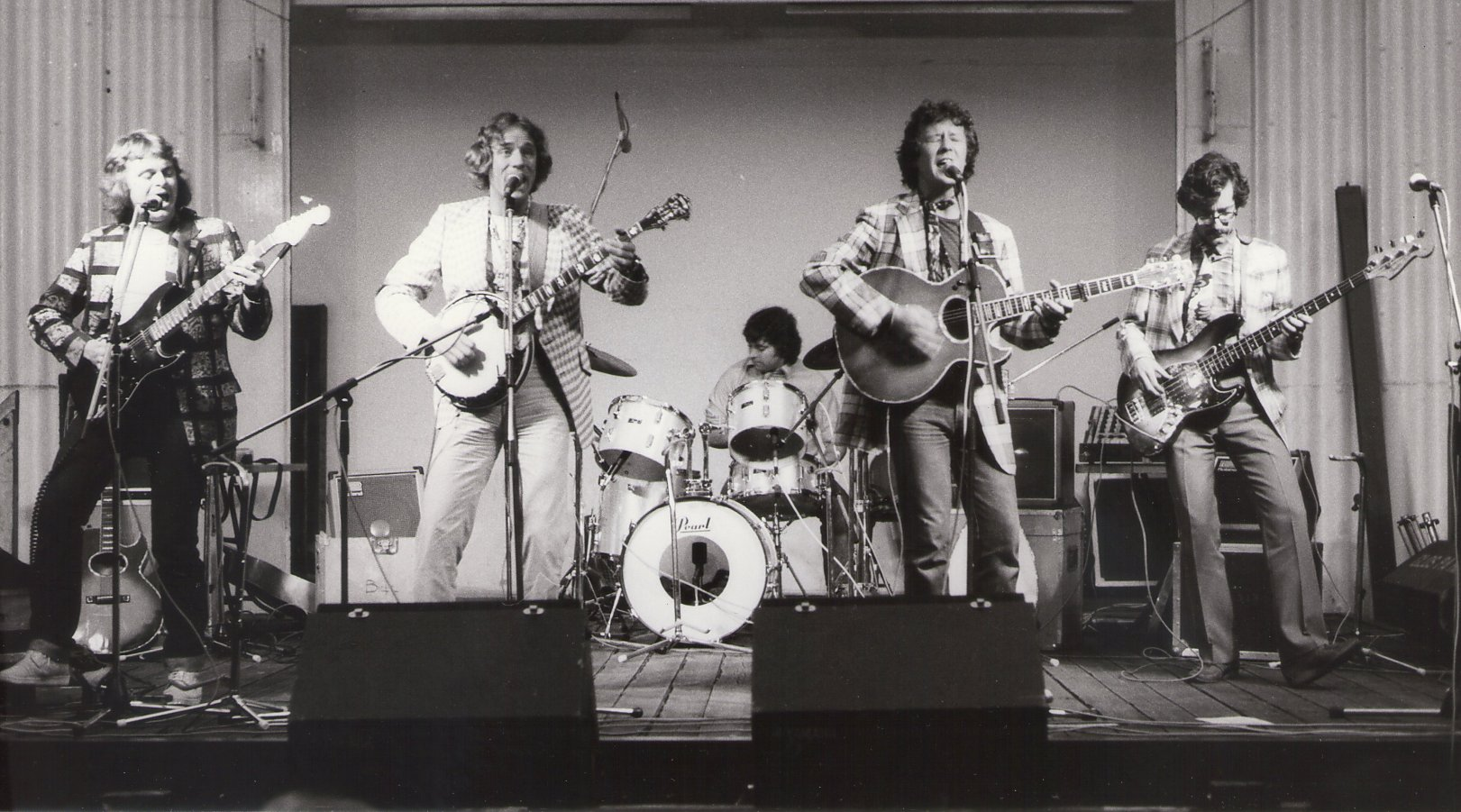
The Arizona Smoke Revue on stage at Greenwich, UK, 1982 (Paul Downes second from right)

== Discography ==
=== Downes and Beer ===
- Life Ain't Worth Living (1973)
- Dance Without Music (1976)
- Live in Concept (1980)
- Live at Nettlebed (2008)

=== Arizona Smoke Revue ===
- Arizona Smoke Revue
- A Thunder in the Horizon
- The Blackwater Boys

=== Joyce Gang ===
- Joyce Gang
- Sober for a Week
- Deadhead Can't Dance
- In Yer Face – Live
- No True Road

=== Solo ===
- Still Life
- Life Goes On
- Directly
- Overdue
- Life Restored (reissue of Still Life and Life Goes On)

=== with Mick Ryan ===
- Grand Conversation
- The Navvy's Wife
