= Miranda Sykes =

English folk singer (born 1978)

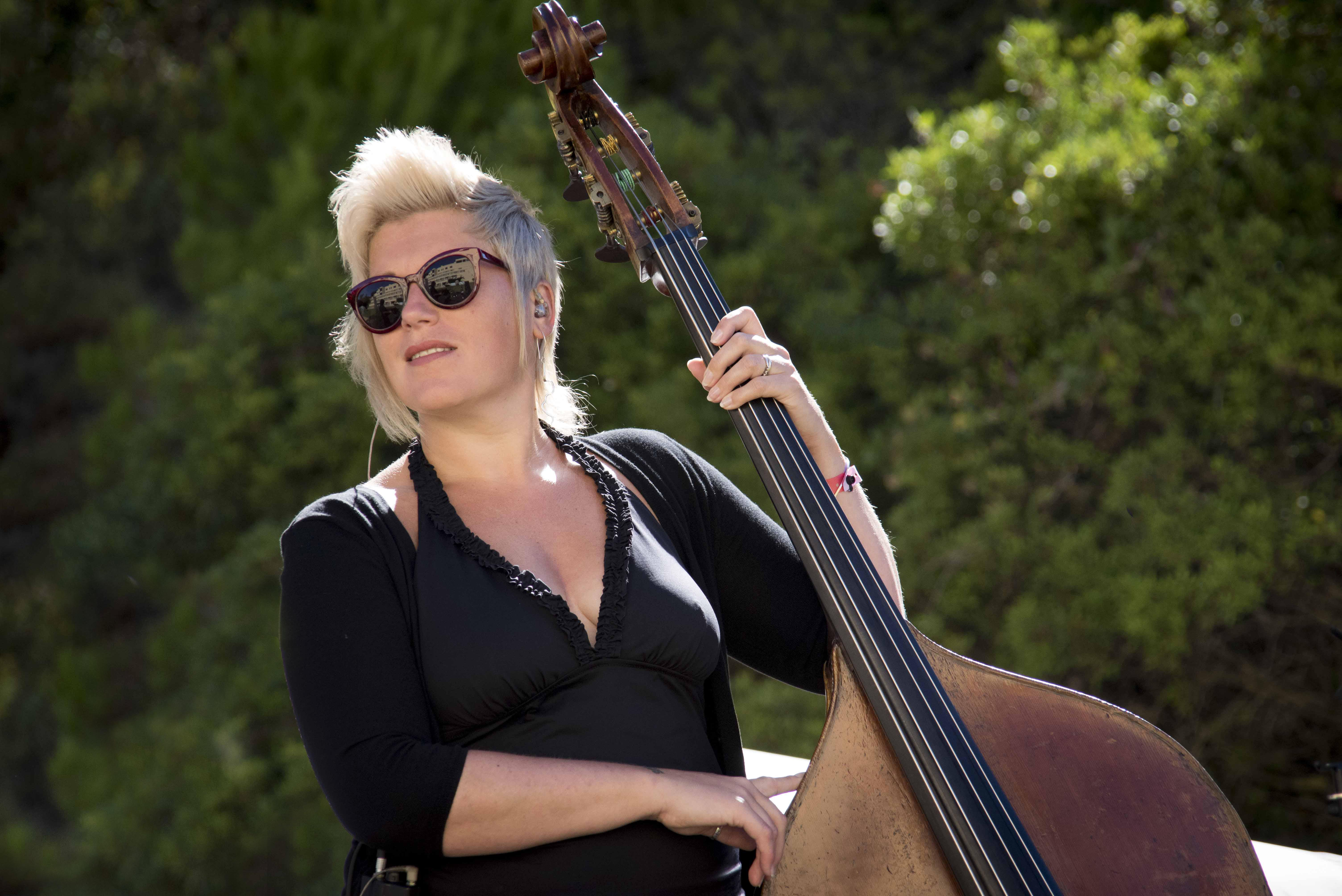
Sykes in 2016

Miranda Sykes (born 1978 in Spalding, Lincolnshire) is an English folk singer, double-bassist and guitarist who performs with Steve Knightley and Phil Beer in the acoustic roots/folk group Show of Hands. As of 2019 she is undertaking solo performances while on maternity leave from the group. She has recorded with Show of Hands and has also performed and recorded as a duo with mandolin player Rex Preston.

== Biography ==
=== Early life and education ===
Sykes was born in Spalding to John and Penny Sykes and was brought up in Pinchbeck, Lincolnshire. Hers was a musical family and she started playing double bass at the age of eight. She was educated at schools in Pinchbeck and Spalding and continued living in Lincolnshire until moving to Devon in 2007. She studied for a BTEC in pop music and completed it remotely while touring with a band.

=== Recording and live performance ===
In 1999, aged 21, she joined the folk-rock band Pressgang as a bass guitarist and toured with them internationally. She performed with Robb Johnson on his 1999 album The Big Wheel, and toured with him and with fiddle and viola player Saskia Tomkins as a trio, releasing three albums together. Subsequently, she joined the band Firebrand, releasing the album Lost Lady Found in 2001.

She toured with Bill Jones' band in 2001, and performed on the band's live album. She then toured with Jones in a trio with Sarah Wright (flute and bodhrán) and subsequently in a duo, featuring on Jones' 2003 CD Two Year Winter.

Sykes toured with The Phil Beer Band from 2003 to 2013 and joined Show of Hands for their performances at summer festivals in 2004. The live album As You Were was recorded during the tour and released in 2005.

Encouraged by melodeon player Gareth Turner, she formed her own band, which included Imogen O’Rourke, Martin Fitzgibbon and Maartin Allcock, releasing an album in 2005.

Sykes worked with John "Rabbit" Bundrick, Sarah Allen and Roy Dodds whilst recording Reg Meuross's album Short Stories in 2004. After touring with Meuross, a second album, Still, was released in 2006.

Sykes toured with Martyn Joseph as a duo in 2007. Joseph's 2007 album, Vegas, featured songs from the tour, on which she played bass.

After performing with Bath band The Scoville Units in 2009, Sykes met mandolin player Rex Preston. They toured as a duo for eight years and released three albums together.

In 2015, Sykes (alongside her fellow Show of Hands band members Steve Knightley and Phil Beer), was awarded an honorary doctorate of music from the University of Plymouth, to commemorate "great distinction in [their] professional lives".

She has toured solo shows to promote her solo albums Borrowed Places (2017) and Behind the Wall (2018).

=== Other work ===
In 2001 she joined The Live Music Now! scheme, which enabled her to get involved in music therapy; she is now a trainer and mentor on the scheme.

=== Personal life ===
She and her husband Dan, who married in 2015, have a son Wilfrid, born in 2018.

== Discography ==
=== As a solo performer ===
- Behind the Wall (CD, album) no label, 2018
- Borrowed Places (CD, album) Hands On Music HMCD44, 2017
- Bliss (CD, album) Hands On Music HMCD24, 2006
- Miranda Sykes Band (CD, album) Irregular Records IRR058, 2005
- Don't Look Down (CD, album) Irregular Records IRR052, 2004

=== with Rex Preston ===
- The Watchmaker's Wife (CD, album) Hands On Music HMCD40, 2016
- Sing A Full Song (CD, album) Hands On Music HMCD37, 2014
- Miranda Sykes & Rex Preston (CD, album) Hands On Music HMCD35, 2012

=== with Show of Hands ===
- Wake the Union (CD, album, Digipak) Hands On Music HMCD36, 2012
- Covers 2 (CD, album, Digipak) Hands On Music HMCD32, 2010
- Witness (CD, album) Hands On Music HMCD23, 2006
- As You Were (2 x CD) Hands On Music HMCD22, 2005
- Arrogance Ignorance and Greed (CD, album) Hands On Music
- Wake the Union (CD, album, Digipak) Hands On Music
- Centenary: Words & Music of the Great War (2 x CD, album) Hands On Music
- The Long Way Home (Show of Hands album) (CD, album) Hands on Music
- Battlefield Dancefloor (CD, album) Hands on Music

=== with Robb Johnson and Saskia Tomkins ===
- 21st Century Blues (CD, album) Irregular Records IRR043, 2001
