= Backlog 2 =

Studio album by Show of Hands
- Released: 4 October 2011
- Recorded: Summer 2011, Suffolk
- Genre: Folk; world
- Length: 79:07
- Label: Hands on Music
- Producer: Mark Tucker

Show of Hands chronology
Covers 2 (2010)	Backlog 2 (2011)	Wake the Union (2012)

Backlog 2 is the fifteenth studio album by Devonian folk duo Show of Hands. Following the release of their limited edition "back to basics" cover album Covers 2 (2010), which was intended for "fans and friends" and released in a limited edition manner in a way that would only appeal to fans and friends, the duo wanted to release an album with fan participation. As the duo had retired many of their older songs from live performances, they asked fans on their internet forum Longdogs to select twenty Show of Hands tracks from 1992–2003 that they would like to hear the duo perform and re-record.

The duo set up in a house studio belonging to friends in Surrey in summer 2011 and recorded eighteen of the twenty selections, three of whom were presented in a "live session". The resulting album, Backlog 2, was released in October 2011 by the duo's own label Hands on Music and was sold only at the duo's concerts and via their website shop. The album is intended as the sequel to their compilation album Backlog 1987–1991 (1995), similarly consisting of material that could have been forgotten. Backlog 2 was not reviewed by publications due to its low-key release but was later ranked at number 13 on WorldMusic.co.uk's list of the "TOP 20 Best World Music Albums of 2011".

== Background and conception ==
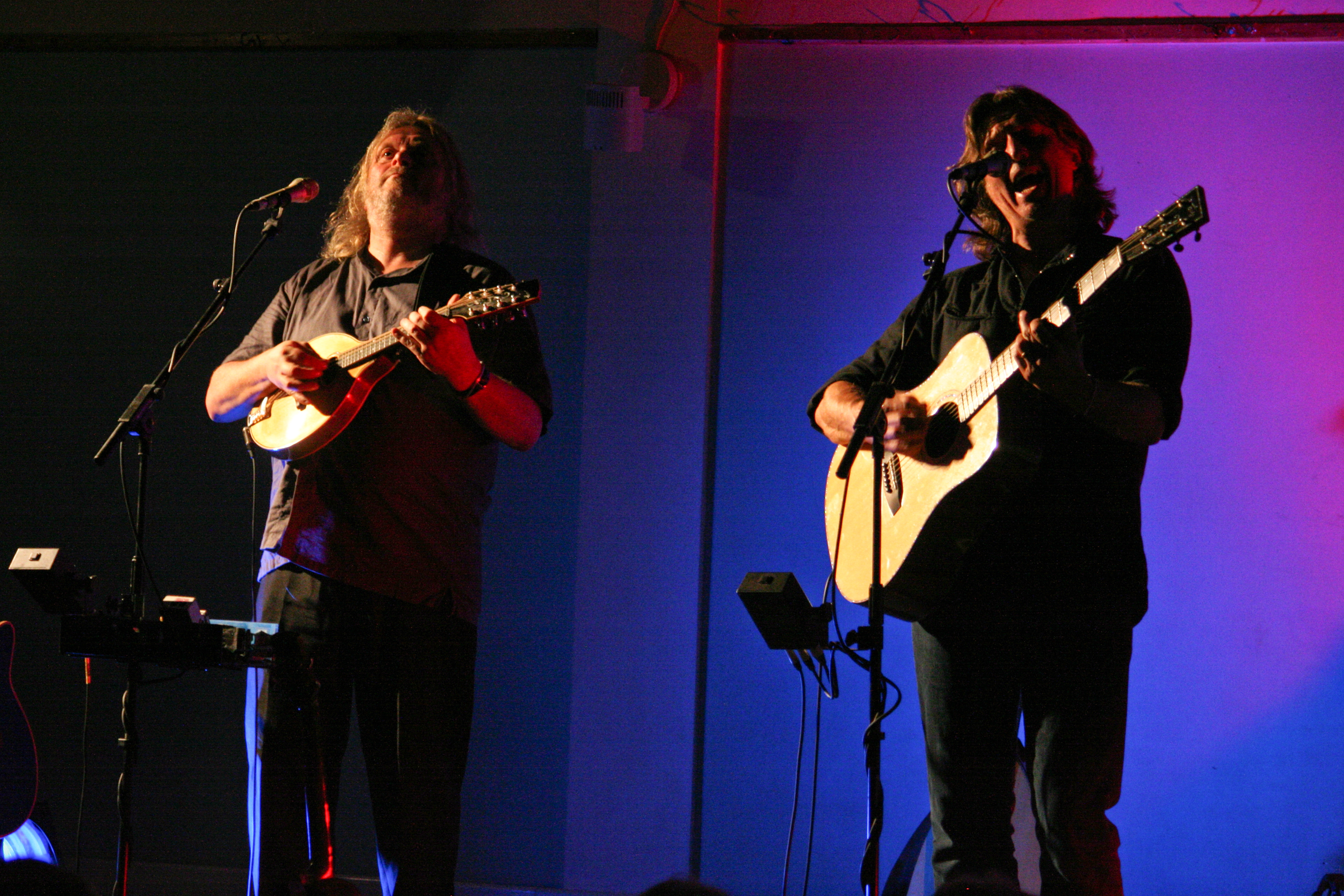
Show of Hands (pictured in 2009).

In 2009, Show of Hands released their fourteenth studio album Arrogance Ignorance and Greed. Produced by Stu Hanna of the English folk duo Megson, with additional production by Mark Tucker, the album followed a painfully emotion period for Steve Knightley where members of his family battled serious illnesses. This led to the album becoming particularly personal and darker than previous Show of Hands albums, aided by Hanna's direct and sharp production. The album was also more politically concerned than prior albums. The album was released to a positive critical reception, many praising the darker tone to the album, although Phil Beer of the duo stated that the album did not sit well with several fans. The album entered the UK Album Chart at number 170, becoming their first album to chart. The duo were not quick to follow the album's success with another album of new material. In late 2010, the duo recorded their second album of cover versions, Covers 2 as a collaboration with Miranda Sykes, ten years after the inaugural Covers album by the duo.

Like the first Covers album, Covers 2 was recorded quickly over the course of seven days in three sessions at Riverside Studios, Exeter, in October 2010. Produced and engineered by the duo's regular producer and engineer Mark Tucker, the album intentionally stays "very close" to the duo's live sound of the duo and Sykes (their "live-trio" sound), and to achieve this, minimal overdubs and few production changes were made to the album. This follows in the footsteps of Covers, which featured no overdubs or production changes at all, and also was a "back to basics" style record when compared to the band's "production" albums of the 2000s, namely Witness and Arrogance Ignorance and Greed, both of which used rhythm sections from guest musicians and experimentation. Cover versions on the album had previously appeared in the duo's live gigs over the previous couple of years, and one critic noted that "collecting them together on an album is a great chance to hear those moments that otherwise would be lost." The album was only released as a limited edition at the duo's concerts and on their website, to show it was for "fans and friends only".

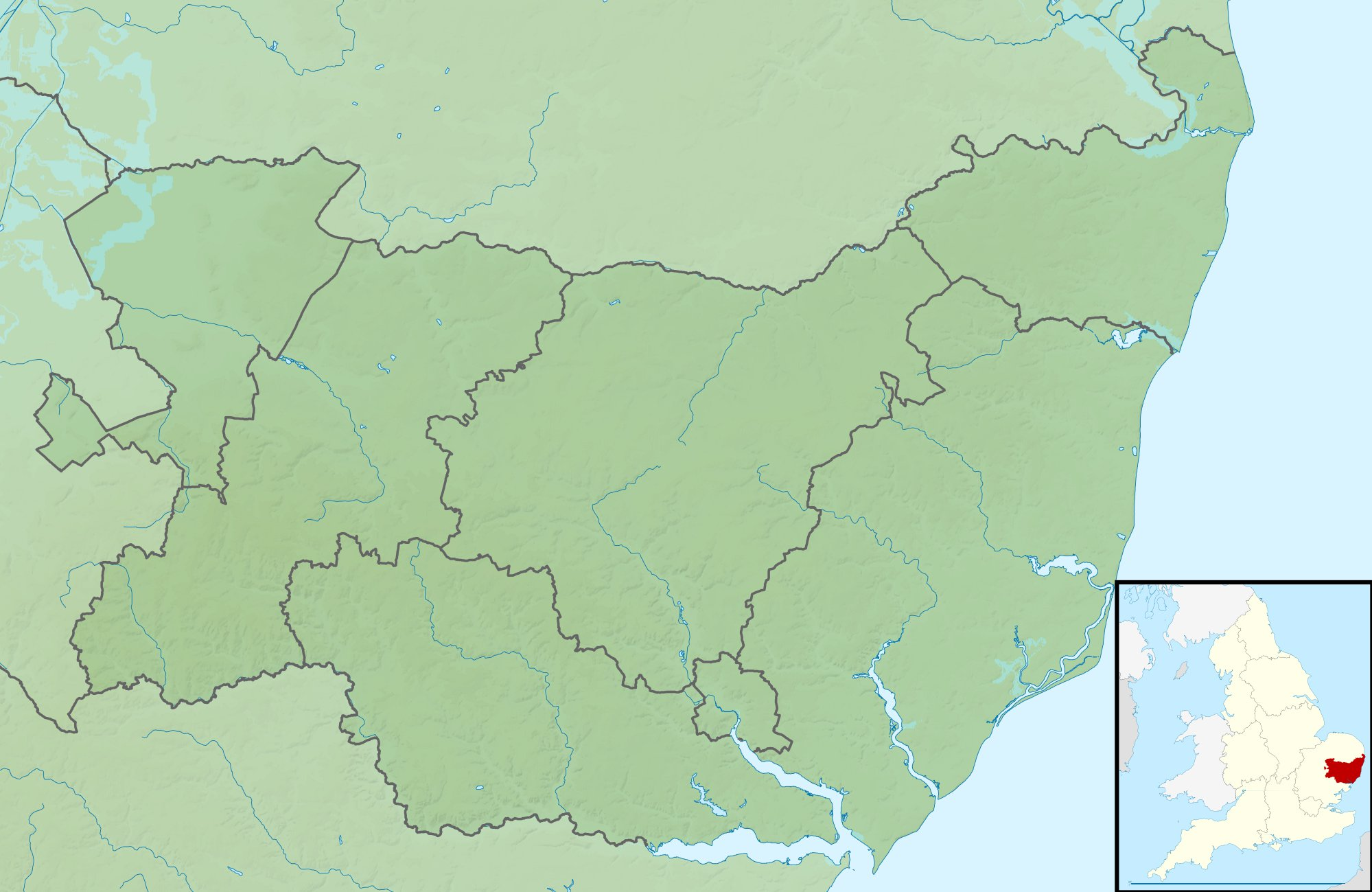
The duo traveled to Suffolk to record the album.

Under the "fans and friends" influence of Covers 2, the duo decided to record an album where their fans would have participation. The duo's live sets over the years had seen numerous songs appear and disappear, and by 2011, many of their older songs had not been played live for many years, and the duo wanted fans to see them reapproach their "forgotten" songs with a new album. Thus, in Summer 2011, the "Longdogs" (members of the duo's former internet forum Longdogs) were asked to select twenty older Show of Hands songs that they would most like to hear performed and re-recorded. Thousands of fans voted. The duo explained that fans created their personal "Top 20" list of songs from the duo's first ten official years of partnership, with instructions to exclude those songs which have already seen numerous outings on different recordings. The duo set up a temporary recording studio in "deepest" Suffolk in the house of the duo's friends Richard and Lin Patterson. Their house was a converted barn. The duo recorded eighteen of the twenty songs for the album in just two days with the help of engineer and producer Mark Tucker. On the second night, the duo hosted a small concert the duo held in the house, referred to as a "house concert". Three of the songs from the concert appear on the second disc instead of studio versions of the same songs. In an even more barebones style than Covers 2, the songs are recorded simply, and feature no extras, effects or overdubs. The duo's earlier album Covers (2000) was recorded the same way.

== Content and release ==
"Backlog 2 is effectively 18 songs captured simply by the two of us with no extras, effects or overdubs."

—Steve Knightley.

The album is a double album, with each disc containing nine songs. The songs re-recorded were originally composed and recorded between 1992–2003, with Worldmusic.co.uk saying the album "features fresh versions of songs that rarely reach the current concert set lists." The first track, "Cold Frontier", was originally the title track for their 2001 album of the same name. "The Bristol Slaver" had featured on Dark Fields (1997) alongside the third track, "High Germany". Re-recorded material from the band's first CD album, Beat about the Bush (1994), was placed on the first disc consecutively with "Captains", "The Oak" and "Armadas" appearing as the fourth to sixth tracks. The second disc features a re-recording of the duo's first single, "Crazy Boy", released from Dark Fields (1997). The disc also features three live songs from the "house concert", namely "Cut-throats, Crooks and Con-men", "Man of War" and "Unlock Me". The former song had never appeared on a studio release by the duo.

The duo chose the album name Backlog 2, identifying the album is a sequel to their compilation album Backlog 1987–1991 (1995). The latter compilation collected highlights from the band's early cassettes which had long been out of print by that point. Backlog 2 was chosen as the name for the new album because, like the compilation, it "archived" songs that could otherwise have been forgotten by the duo. The album was released on 4 October 2011 by the duo's own record label Hands on Music. Like Covers 2, it was only released at the band's concerts and through their website, reflecting the "fans" aspect of the album.

As the album was a low-key release, it was not reviewed by any publications, but was later ranked at number 13 on WorldMusic.co.uk's list of the "TOP 20 Best World Music Albums of 2011". The same website also placed the album's version of "The Bristol Slaver" as the 22nd track in their "WBUK36" playlist, the thirty-sixth playlist used in the website's online radio show WorldBeatUK, presented by the website's editor Glyn Philips. The duo promoted the album with The Backlog Tour in October 2011. Featuring songs featured on the album, it was the duo's first tour for four years that featured only the duo without their regular collaborator Miranda Sykes, although Sykes joined them on the Autumn Tour 2011 that followed it. The Backlog Tour ran for twelve concerts across England from 12–30 October 2011, and was a success as it sold out. A month after release, whilst the duo were undergoing their Autumn tour, they were voted "Best Folk Act" at the inaugural South West Music Awards, whose winners were chosen by venus around the South West of England. In March 2012, the duo played their fourth performance at the Royal Albert Hall, London, during which they also showcased Backlog 2 material.

== Track listing ==
All songs written by Steve Knightley, except where noted.

=== Disc one ===
1. "Cold Frontier" – 4:50
2. "The Bristol Slaver" (Sydney Carter) – 4:37
3. "High Germany" (Leonard Cohen) – 5:43
4. "Captains" – 4:31
5. "The Oak" – 4:12
6. "Armadas" – 4:30
7. "Cold Heart of England" – 3:08
8. "The Preacher" – 4:28
9. "The Warlike Lads of Russia" – 3:57

=== Disc two ===
1. "Crazy Boy" (Cyril Tawney) – 5:40
2. "Cut-throats, Crooks and Con-men" (live) – 5:00
3. "Don't It Feel Good" – 3:43
4. "Man of War" (live) – 4:09
5. "Roaring Water Bay" – 4:04
6. "Sit You Down" – 5:16
7. "Unlock Me" (live) – 3:42
8. "The Man in Green" – 3:07
9. "You're Mine" – 4:27
