= Centenary: Words & Music of the Great War =

Studio album by Show of Hands
- Released: 30 June 2014
- Recorded: 2013−14
- Studios: The Green Room, Devon; Abbey Road Studios, London
- Genres: Folk; poetry
- Length: 78:06
- Labels: Mighty Village; Universal Music
- Producers: Steve Knightley; Mark Tucker

Show of Hands chronology
Wake the Union (2012)	Centenary: Words & Music of the Great War (2014)	The Long Way Home (2015)

Singles from Centenary
- 1. ""The Lads in their Hundreds"" Released: 14 July 2014

Centenary: Words & Music of the Great War is a studio album released in 2014 to commemorate the centenary of the outbreak of World War I. The unique project is a double album by English folk duo Show of Hands; the first disc features war poems recited by Jim Carter and Imelda Staunton set to the duo's music, whilst the second disc features songs inspired by the War, sung instead by Show of Hands' lead singer Steve Knightley.

The album was released on 30 June 2014 on Ian Brown's label Mighty Village, through Universal Music, becoming Show of Hands' first album since 1995 not to be released on their own label Hands on Music. The album contains the single "Lads in their Hundreds", released as a single 14 July 2014. Although not strictly a compilation, the album reached number 13 in the UK Compilation Chart, and became perhaps the duo's best known album.

== Background and development ==
=== Outbreak of World War I and war poetry ===
The July Crisis had culminated in Austria-Hungary declaring war on the Kingdom of Serbia on 28 July 1914. Over the following days and weeks, this and the invasion of Luxembourg and Belgium by the German Empire, led to a succession of other declarations of war that drew the major European powers into a worldwide conflict, the Great War, later to become known as World War I. In the 2010s, leading up to the centenary of the outbreak in 2014, governments in Europe began preparing for a series of official commemorative events to mark the occasion. Other than official memorials, narrative films and music was being created to mark the event.

During World War I, there was a great wave of British war poets, poets who participate in a war and writes about their experiences. The term "war poet" is generally applied especially to those who served during World War I.

=== Centenary ===
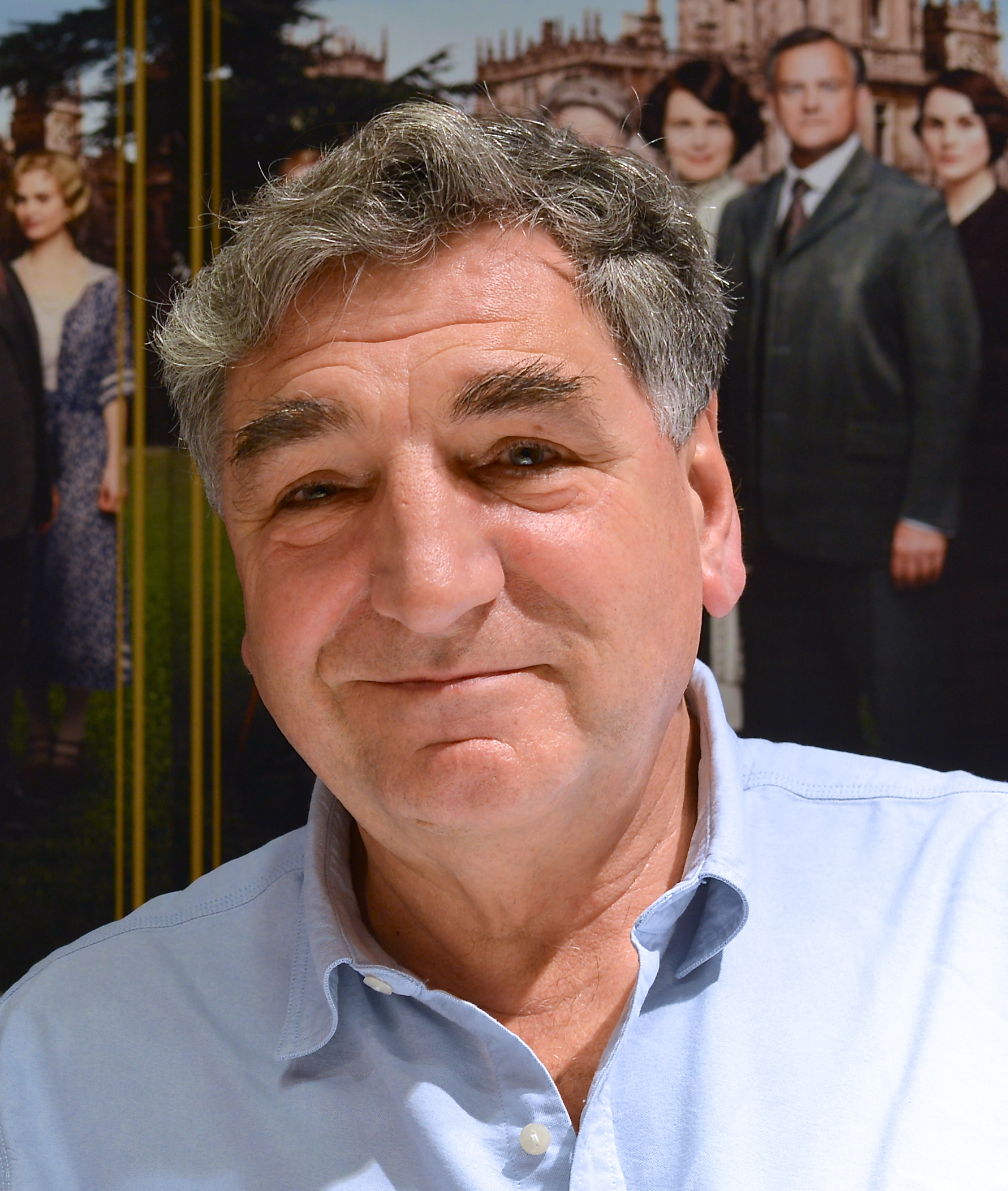
Jim Carter (pictured in 2013) was asked by Knightley to read the poems on the album with his wife Imelda Staunton.

In 2013, Ian Brown, manager of the sea shanty folk group Fisherman's Friends, created plans to commemorate the centenary of the outbreak with a studio album, which would be released on his record label Mighty Village, via major label Universal Music. He asked the Devon-based folk duo Show of Hands (Steve Knightley and Phil Beer) if they would be interested in a major recording project to commemorate the event, and the duo accepted, and began work at Christmas 2013. The duo had recently released their sixteenth studio album Wake the Union (2012) to critical acclaim and toured in promotion of the album throughout 2013.

The duo had decided to create a double album, with two stylistically different discs. The first disc would contain war poems written during World War I, whilst the second disc would comprise songs. Knightley chose not to recite the poems on the first disc himself and instead opted for his old friend, actor Jim Carter and his wife Imelda Staunton.

Knightley and Carter had known each other since around 1980; the two lived in the same flat building in Maida Vale, London, where the two would regularly visit The Warwick Castle pub together. When Knightley moved back from London to his native West Country, the two did not see each other for about five or six years, until Knightley held a benefit concert in Dorset, and invited Carter and his wife Staunton. Carter performed as a magician whilst Staunton sang soul classics. Knightley noted she had an "amazing voice". Knightley and the couple did not cross paths for a great number of years. Show of Hands, and therefore Knightley, had become more popular over the years, whilst Carter's role as an actor became highly prolific, with his best known role being Mr Carson in the ITV drama Downton Abbey (2010−present), whilst Staunton reached similar heights as an actress, well known for her award-winning titular performance in Vera Drake.

After beginning work on Centenary, Knightley approached Carter and Staunton and asked if they could recite poems for the album, and the couple agreed. Carter recalled that he and Knightley had been "out of touch for a few years when, out of the blue, he got in touch [in 2013]: he'd had an idea for the centenary of the First World War, setting poetry to music−and he asked me to read the poems". Carter and Show of Hands had previously collaborated when Carter read "The Wrecker’s Prayer" at the start of Show of Hands' 1990 opus "Tall Ships", from the album of the same name.

== Recording ==
The album was produced and arranged by Knightley with Show of Hands' regular producer Mark Tucker, who recorded and mixed the album at The Green Room, Devon. Jonathan Allen engineer the album with assistance from Matt Jones. Carter and Staunton recorded the poetry at Abbey Road Studios, London. The recordings were then sent to Show of Hands and Tucker in Devon who then spent "three months or so trying to find settings, just themes, just atmospheres, from all of those classic songs". Knightley said that it was a "labour of love", because "sometimes there's a mismatch, and sometimes you record a version of one of those songs and you can't find the poetry to go with, and then occasionally, everything just locks together, and you have this wonderful moment in the studio where people are reduced to tears or of joy and laughter." He further commented that when moments like that happen, "you just have this great moment where you feel very privileged to be part of something".

The duo were also asked "wherever possible" to use instruments such as a tenor guitar and an octave mandolin, due to them being current in World War I. Knightley said that, for example, they "could take 'I Vow to Thee, My Country' played on the solo instrument rather than by an orchestra" and "it would become a bit more plaintive", and that the poem that "just locked together" with it "straight away" was Carter's reading of "The Soldier". Knightley commented that recording the album was a "fascinating three months work".

== Content ==
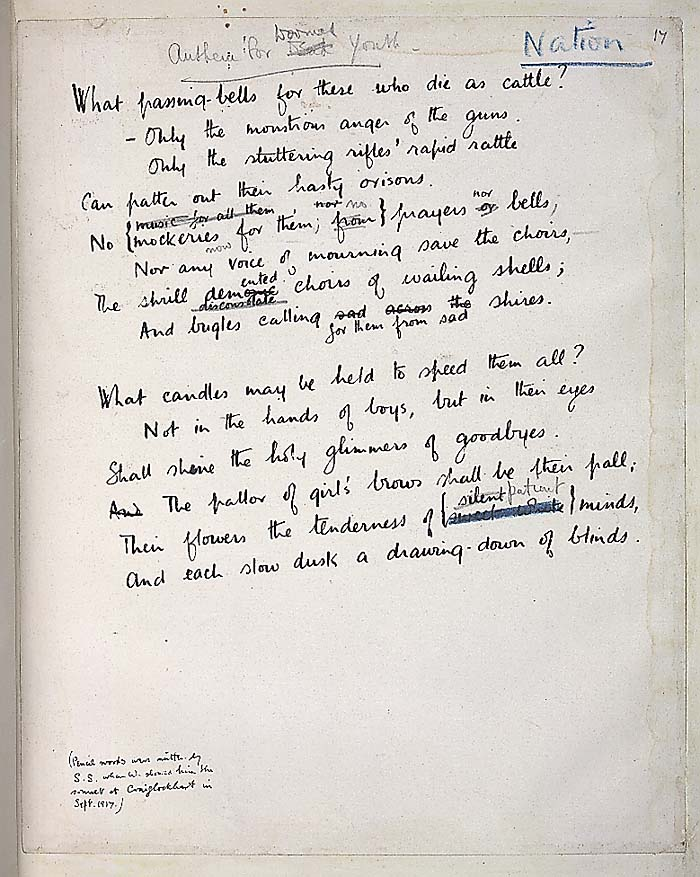
A version of Wilfred Owen's "Anthems for Doomed Youth" (lyrics pictured) opens the album.

The album marks the second time that Show of Hands and Carter had collaborated, as Carter had recited "The Wrecker’s Prayer" at the start of their 1990 opus "Tall Ships", from the album of the same name. Carter also commented that despite being married to Imelda for three decades, they have had few occasions to collaborate and this album was "a very rare opportunity for us to work together". Knightley said Carter "has such distinctive tones with rich overtones that he's brought an incredible sense of Englishness to the album, and−it has to be said−the resonance of Downton and that period."

The first disc, Music and Poetry, features twenty-two of the original war poems set to musical tunes that were well known at the time and played on instruments familiar to those who fought in the war, such as acoustic guitar, concertina, octave-mandolin, harmonica, fiddle, melodeon, piano and double bass. The poems are read by Carter and Staunton, whilst the music is performed by Show of Hands. The selection of poems includes Wilfred Owen's "Anthem for Doomed Youth" and "Dulce et Decorum est", along with works by Siegfried Sassoon and "I Have a Rendezvous with Death, written by Alan Seeger, the uncle of the late folk star Peter Seeger. There are also works by female poets, such as AE Housman's "The Lads in their Hundreds", which dates back to the end of the 19th century and that was reappropiated during World War I. "When This Bloody War is Over" was originally recorded by Beer as part of a medley with traditional piece "Flowers of the Forest" for his solo album Rhythm Methodist (2005). Beer had learnt the song many years prior in a Methodist chapel.

The second disc, Songs Inspired by the Great War, is dominated by songs instead of poetry, with Show of Hands presenting distinctive versions of World War I favourites as well as newer material and songs composed especially for the project inspired by the war. Unlike the first disc, Show of Hands were given a free rein, and on occasion, they took music from the first disc and extended it. Knightley created "Requiem" and his own setting of Housman's "The Lads in their Hundreds", while the duo's occasional collaborator and fellow Topsham songwriter Chris Hoban composed "The Padre" and "Love Will Make the World Go Round" specially for the project. Previous collaborators Jackie Oates and Jim Causley appear on a medley of "Goodbye-ee" and "If You Were the Only Girl in the World" whilst "The Sunshine of Your Smile" features Miranda and Rex Preston. Knightley's composition "The Keeper" ("The Gamekeeper"), played with a mandolin, was re-arranged by Chris Hoban to overlap with the traditional songs "The Keeper" and "The Water is Wide" and features Phil Henry and Hannah Martin. The disc also contains a "beatbox harmonica treatment" of "It's a Long Way to Tipperary". "The Blue Cockade" features the Urban Soul Orchestra, who had accompanied Show of Hands on tour the previous year.

== Release and reception ==
Professional ratings
Review scores
Source	Rating
AAA Music	4/5 stars
The Financial Times	3/5 stars
Folk Radio	favourable
The Guardian	4/5 stars
The Living Tradition	favourable
Press Party	favourable
Spiral Earth	favourable
The Daily Telegraph	3/5 stars

Centenary was released on 30 June 2010 by Brown's record label Mighty Village via Universal Music, becoming Show of Hands' first album since 1995 not to be released by their own record label Hands on Music. The release date of 30 June was the day before the July commemorations began. Its artwork was designed by Stylorogue. On 18 May, a month before the album's release, a radio edit of "The Lads in their Hundreds" was released as a digital download single. A music video for the song was released on 20 June. The general version of the single was released 14 July. Knightley and Carter appeared on ITV breakfast show This Morning on 20 June to promote the album, whilst on 30 July, Knightley appeared on The Mark Radcliffe Folk Show on BBC Radio 2. In November, Knightley and Carter continued to promote the album on the airwaves, being interviewed by Simon Mayo on his BBC Radio 2 show Drivetime on 4 November and Andrew Marr on BBC One's The Andrew Marr Show on 9 November, in addition to a feature on BBC Radio 4's Soul Music on 11 November.

The album was critically acclaimed. Anthony Weightman of AAA Music rated the album four stars out of five and said "the album is a moving insight into being at home and in battle during those dark years. It contains inspired, powerful and extraordinary war poetry and remarkable new music which reflects the emotions of the time." Johnny Whalley of Folk Radio said the album "stimulates such a variety of emotions and fittingly commemorates without glorifying a wasted generation." Kevin T. Ward of The Living Tradition said the album was "creatively crafted with immense skill and sensitivity, rich in range and mood, this is a memorable piece of work of enduring experiential, emotional and educational value." Iain Hazlewood of Spiral Earth said "a hundred years is no time at all, Carter and Staunton make it real and immediate, whilst Show of Hands make it heartfelt." Shire Folk later ranked the album at number 1 on their list of the "Top 10 Albums of 2014". The Daily Telegraph also included it in their unordered list of "The Best Folk Albums of 2014".

The album became a new entry reaching number 4 on Amazon.co.uk's "Hot New Releases" chart alongside Coldplay's Ghost Stories and Kasabian's 48:13. On 6 July 2014, the album debuted on the UK Compilation Chart at number 13. The album fell to number 46 the following week. In its third and final week it charted at number 70. Despite its placement on the UK Compilation Chart, the album itself is not a compilation but a studio album, as all of its contents were recorded specifically for the album. It was included in the chart because it was categorized as a various artists release due to the multiple artists who contribute to the album, and the chart includes all various artist albums regardless of whether they are compilations, studio or live albums. The album became arguably the duo's best known album.

== Track listing ==
=== Disc one: Music and Poetry ===
1. "Anthem for Doomed Youth / The Flowers of the Forest"
2. "Lamplight / The Sunshine of Your Smile"
3. "Concert Party / It's a Long Way to Tipperary"
4. "A Girl’s song / Goodbye-ee"
5. "I Have a Rendezvous With Death / Keep the Home Fires Burning"
6. "The Lads in Their Hundreds / Isca Rose"
7. "To Victory / The Menin Gate / Hanging on the Old Barbed Wire"
8. "Who's for the Game / Love Will Make the World Go Round"
9. "The Silent One / Pack Up Your Troubles (In Your Old Kit Bag)"
10. "Requiem for the Dead of Europe / Roses of Picardy"
11. "The General / Bombed Last Night"
12. "Break of Day in the Trenches / Fred Karno's Army"
13. "The Call / The Padre"
14. "Dulce et Decorum est / Landsend"
15. "Trench Poets / When This Bloody War is Over"
16. "To An Athlete Dying Young / If You Were the Only Girl in the World"
17. "August 1914 / Hallsands"
18. "The Soldier Addresses His Body / I Wore a Tunic"
19. "An Irish Airman Foresees His Death / Cain Mc Slainte"
20. "Slumber Song / Silent Night"
21. "The Soldier / Thaxted"
22. "For the Fallen / Coming Home / Bonnie Light Horseman"

=== Disc two: Songs inspired by the Great War ===
1. "The Gamekeeper"
2. "Goodbye-ee / If You Were the Only Girl in the World / The Lovely Nymph"
3. "The Lads in Their Hundreds"
4. "The Padre"
5. "Coming Home"
6. "It's a Long Way to Tipperary"
7. "The Sunshine of Your Smile"
8. "Silent Night"
9. "Love Will Make The World Go Round"
10. "Goodbye Till The Next Time"
11. "The Blue Cockade"
12. "Requiem"

== Charts ==
Chart (2014)	Peak position
UK Compilation Chart	13

== See also ==
- Songs of the First World War
