= Arrogance Ignorance and Greed =

Studio album by Show of Hands
- Released: 26 October 2009
- Recorded: 2009
- Studio: Riverside Studios, Exeter, Devon
- Genre: Folk; British folk rock
- Length: 52:29
- Label: Hands on Music
- Producer: Stu Hanna

Show of Hands chronology
Witness (2006)	Arrogance Ignorance and Greed (2009)	Covers 2 (2010)

Singles from Dark Fields
- 1. ""Arrogance Ignorance and Greed"" Released: 2010

Arrogance Ignorance and Greed is the fourteenth studio album by English folk duo Show of Hands. Released in 2009 on the band's label Hands on Music, the album was produced by Stu Hanna of the English folk duo Megson, with additional production by Mark Tucker. The album followed an emotionally painful period for Steve Knightley where members of his family battled serious illnesses. This led to the album becoming particularly personal and darker than previous Show of Hands albums, aided by Hanna's direct and sharp production. The album also discusses several social and political concerns, and contains several collaborations with other musicians and vocalists.

The album was released to a positive critical reception, many praising the darker tone to the album, Knightley's lyrics and Hanna's production. Some fans, however, were alienated by the album. The album entered the UK Album Chart at number 170, becoming their first album to chart. The album featured in numerous year-end best albums lists, including Fatea Magazine who named it "Album of the Year 09," and at the BBC Radio 2 Folk Awards 2010, the band won the award for "Best Duo" whilst the album's title song won "Best Original Song".

== Background ==
In 2006, the duo's album Witness had proven unusually successful. The album was produced by Simon Emmerson and Massey of Afro Celt Sound System and featured a crossover African and electronica-influenced sound with the band's typical English folk style. The album marked the first time since Beat about the Bush (1994) that the duo had undertaken experiments with a rhythm section. Although some fans were uncertain of the album's direction, many fans and critics welcomed it and it became the band's best-selling album. The duo toured in 2006–2007, which included a unique "Tour of Topsham" pubs and a 20th anniversary concert at the Royal Albert Hall. Steve Knightley also released his solo album Cruel River (2007).

The duo had decided that their next album would continue the outsider producer motif of Witness, only with a different style. Prior to recording, Knightley endured a couple of painfully emotional years as his mother, brother and young son all battled serious illness. This had great effect on the music he began to write. He recorded a re-recording of his album Track of Words (1999) entitled Track of Words: Retraced for release in mid-2009 and undertook a promotional tour. At the same time, Beer was hooked on seafaring after fulfilling a lifelong dream by crewing on Pegasus in the Tall Ships Race in 2009. The 74 ft Bristol-built wooden cutter – owned by the educational Island Trust – crossed the finishing line in second place in its class after a voyage of 4,500 nautical miles visiting 12 countries. Beer's reclusion from music lead to a more prominent musical part from Knightley, and the duo began work on the album in early 2009. Knightley said that "on this record, it seemed there was a connection between current affairs and personal affairs but I didn't know how to turn it into songs, and so I sort of suddenly found a way." Although the duo had already played four of the songs live, most of them were written in a "rush" in Spring 2009. During the tour's two-week tour of Germany in Spring 2009, Knightley said that although he did not have a lot of songs "in the locker, they all came sort of pouring out with a bit of distance between me and home." Sykes recalled that during the Germany tour, Knightley told her to listen to his new composition "IED", and she cried and was "pretty speechless".

== Recording and music ==
"The appropriately complementary lean, often nervily edgy musical settings enable Steve to pull his lyric punches soberly and make a greater impact than if backed by a more fulsome or glossy production."

—David Kidman of NetRhythms.

The album was produced by Stu Hanna of the band Megson, who brought the album what one review described as "distinctive (cutting) edge of extra-crisp definition", and was recorded at Riverside Studios, Exeter, in 2009. Colin Irwin of the BBC said that "the mix of Knightley’s intense material and Hanna’s brutally direct production gives Show of Hands an almost punk potency" and said the album has an "overriding rawness", whilst Jeanette Leech, also of the BBC, acknowledged the duo "stripped back the Show of Hands sound, evoking a politicised post-folk, pre-punk grittiness." Irwin also observed that Knightley sings "so close to the microphone it feels like he’s climbed right inside your ear," reflecting the album's "inherent darkness". Spiral Earth commented that Hanna "boldly puts Steve's vocal right up in the mix." Mark Tucker also provided additional production on the album.

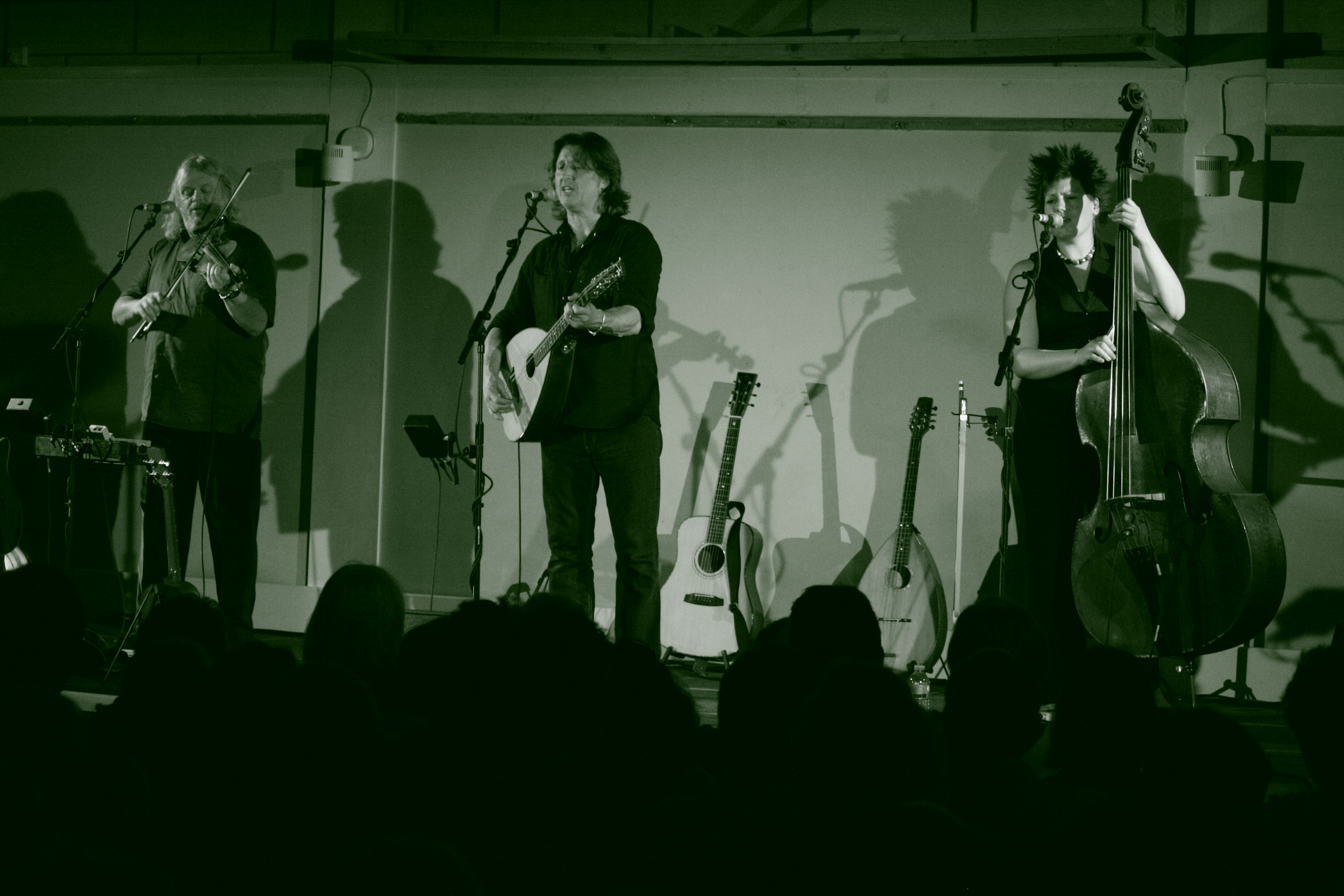
Show of Hands and Miranda Sykes performing live five months before the album's release.

David Kidman of NetRhythms noted that "the overall soundscape" of the album "can actually sound rather stark", even compared to the duo's "more bare-bones-style" from earlier offerings, but noted that "this element carries with it a distinctive (cutting) edge of extra-crisp definition, and it accentuates that additional degree of uneasy bleakness [he] noted in so many of the songs," giving much credit to Stu Hanna for the sound. He also noted that "although it is characterised by the direct, literal potency of the actual lyrics, it's arguably brought out even more in the new gravel-edged textural quality that Steve's singing voice has now developed: a cracked vulnerability, an extra dimension of grainy weariness (at once resigned and resolutely defiant - the fist is definitely clenched), where he seems drained from the personal events he's undergone over the past year." He noted that at times this makes for "a less than comfortable listen and take a bit of getting used to", but that it was "very powerful indeed". Spiral Earth observed that "the songs deal with everything from the global financial meltdown to Darwin's theories, Knightley's ability to conjure a whole gallery of images from a few words is the ongoing delight." The BBC noted the album carried an "inherent darkness" that was the direct result of Knightley's trauma.

The duo's regular collaborator Miranda Sykes appears on the album, performing both the double bass and singing backing vocals. Jackie Oates performs a vocal duet with Knightley on "The Vale" and "The Keys", while Debbie Hanna has a vocal cameo on "IED: Science and Nature" and "Drift". Andy Tween performs "refreshingly lean-etched" drumming and cajon on four tracks, Matt Clifford performs piano on a further two, and the three members of Mawkin: Causley appear on "The Napoli".

=== Composition ===
The album begins with "Lowlands", a traditional song re-arranged by the duo. The song is an a cappella sung by Knightley alone. One commentary noted that the duo had the "temerity" to start the album with the piece, with Knightley's voice being "starkly unaccompanied," whilst another noted that his vocal provides a "deceptively underpowered-seeming opening gambit, and yet before too long you feel it subliminally creeping up on you with the onset of some eerie drone instrumentation, as Steve's voice acquires a breathtaking and disturbing quality." The BBC noted that "Knightley’s boldly coarse delivery of "Lowlands" instantly sets up the mood of rugged wayness that characterises the record." The song is followed by the tongue-in-cheek "Evolution", which primally purveys Knightley's own personal stance on Darwinian theory. The third track, "The Man I Was", is one of the album's most autobiographical and "penetratingly soul-searching" songs. The "biting social comment" of "The Napoli" is a collaboration with Jim Causley and the Delarre Brothers, and features Knightley's "wry observance and his perceptive wit." The song is followed by the duo's cover version of Bob Dylan's "Senor (Tales of Yankee Power)".

The BBC noted that with the sixth track, "IED: Science or Nature", "disease is sinisterly portrayed as an unexploded bomb waiting to be detonated by forces unknown amid ghostly echoes of the traditional song "The Trees They Do Grow High"". "The Vale" has been said to evoke Knightley's mother's wartime evacuation to a Dorset village, whilst the title track, "Arrogance Ignorance and Greed", is a "heartfelt tirade" against bankers and bonuses, MPs and expenses. Beer's electric fiddle sound on the song was inspired by Jackson Browne. "Secret World", sung by Beer, is a cover of the Peter Gabriel song from his album Us (1992). The duo re-recorded the song for their following album Covers 2 (2010). One reviewer observed "something of a lack of Beer's trademark flourishes, the fiddle, slide guitar and his voice on "AIG", hardly surprising considering his activities this year. The unexpected result is a shake up in the trademark SOH sound that will inject fresh variety into their live performances." "The Worried Well" is a gospel-tinged "full-throttle assault" on alternative medicine, whilst the traditional "Keys to Canterbury" is a vocal duet between Knightley and Jackie Oates that has been described as "driving, funky-folk". The last listed song on the album is "Drift", described as a "weird emotional melting-pot that produces the apprehensive daydreaming reverie." The album finishes with an unlisted hidden track on a separate track number, which is officially untitled but often referred to as "Rain Rain Go Away".

== Release and promotion ==
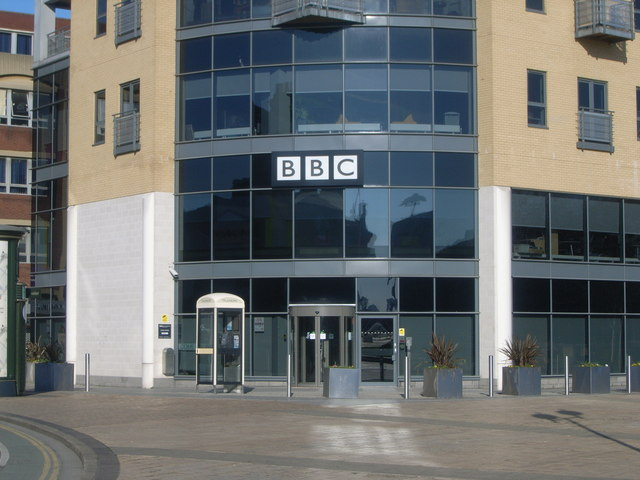
The duo made numerous appearances on local BBC Radio stations across the country to promote the album (BBC Radio office pictured.)

The album was announced in the duo's fan club newsletter of July 2009, and the album quickly became "hotly anticipated". The duo uploaded samples of the album onto their website 29 September 2009. In addition to touring, the duo spent the end of September and much of October promoting the album on radio. The duo were interviewed by John Rockley for his BBC Radio Gloucestershire show on 30 September. Bob Harris played "Evolution" on his BBC Radio 2 show the following day. On 4 October, the duo began their County Town Tour. Mike Harding played a song from the album on his BBC Radio 2 show The Mike Harding Show on 7 October. On 8 October, Knightley was interviewed about the album on Spirit FM's show The Ian Crouch Show. Mike Harding interviewed the duo for 15 October for usage on a later show. On 17 October, Beer was interviewed about the album for BBC Radio Wiltshire and on 18 October by Ian Pearce for BBC Three Counties Radio. On 21 October, John Barnes interviewed Knightley about the album for BBC Radio Lancashire and on 22 October, he appeared on The Paul Franks Show to talk about the album on BBC Radio WM. On both days, Fiona Talkington played songs from the album on BBC Radio 3's Late Junction show. On 23 October, Johnnie Walker played the title track on BBC Radio 2 and declared Show of Hands to be "such a good band". This airing of the song saw the album climb numerous Amazon.co.uk charts. The duo reported on 23 October that it currently charted at number 49 on the "Music Bestsellers (All)" chart", number 3 on the "Music Bestsellers (World & Folk genre)" chart, a rise of 150%, number 12 on the "Hot Future Releases (All)" chart, number 1 on the "Hot Future Releases (World & Folk)" chart and number 9 on the "Movers & Shakers In Music" chart, a rise of 157%.

Besides radio promotion, the album was promoted in other ways. On 7 October, Play.com ran a competition giving 25 fans the chance to win a pair of tickets to see Show Of Hands premiere the album at an exclusive concert in the Gibson Guitar Rooms in Central London on 28 October. The competition closed on 18 October. The album itself was released on 26 October 2009 via the duo's own independent record label Hands on Music with the catalogue number HMCD29. A radio promo CD containing the songs "Evolution", "Arrogance Ignorance and Greed" and "The Man I Was" was distributed to radio stations in 2009. The title song of the album, "Arrogance Ignorance and Greed", was released as its own single two times in 2010, firstly without any other tracks and secondly as a double A-side with "The Keys to Canterbury". It was also featured in The Guardian "F&M Playlist" on 6 November, and a music video was produced for the song which was uploaded to the duo's YouTube channel on 13 November. Knightley also published his fourth songbook, Songbook 4, in 2010, featuring the eleven songs he composed for the album. Jon Richardson played "Senor" on BBC Radio 6 Music on 22 November, whilst "The Keys to Canterbury" featured as the tenth song in the December 2009 playlist for "Ian Anderson's fRoots Radio Show".

== Reception ==
Professional ratings
Review scores
Source	Rating
BBC	favourable
Fatea Magazine	favourable
NetRhythms	favourable
Spiral Earth	4/5 stars

The album was released to a positive critical reception. Colin Irwin of the BBC said the album was "a committed, convincing reinvention of a Brit folk institution" and an "extraordinarily earthy effort" that shows the duo "punching hard". David Kidman of NetRhythms was impressed with the music on the album, although less so with its sequencing, but ultimately considering the album "indispensable". He said that "notwithstanding the overall excellence of the product and its abundance of must-have qualities, the final impression on complete playthroughs still obstinately remains one of an album whose sum is less constantly great than its individual constituent parts. For, although credibly sequenced, it doesn't quite hang together logically; perhaps befitting its coy bonus track (the gentle, quiet backporch-style singalong "Rain Song"), it's a cloudy, mist-ridden enigma from which (I'm convinced) at some unspecified time in the future the fog is destined to suddenly part. It's nevertheless rapidly becoming one of the most indispensable Show Of Hands releases for me." Spiral Earth were very positive in their review, saying that despite the album being the band's twentieth, the duo "still no sign of predictability or laurels being sat upon." Fatea Magazine said that the album was "political, passionate, life affirming – this is folk of true Olympian proportions. If there’s a better written, produced and performed album released this year I’m going to have to commission someone to invent new superlative." On 7 November, The Independent named it "Album of the Week". Whilst playing "Senor" from the album on his BBC Radio 6 Music show, Jon Richardson said "the album is just amazing".

Due to considerable promotion, the album charted at number 170 on the UK Album Chart, their first album to chart. Although the album was met with critical praise, Phil Beer of the duo said the album did not "go down well" with the duo's core audience. The album's new direction and Hanna's production was not to the liking of all the duo's fans, but many of them welcomed the album. The album was included in Mike Ganley's Crooked Road "Top 10 Albums 2009" list, and was a runner-up in the fRoots critics' poll of the top 20 "New Albums of 2009". Fatea Magazine named it "Album of the Year 09". At the Spiral Earth Awards 2010, the duo were nominated for "Best Album", where they finished third, "Best Trad Song" for "The Keys of Canterbury", where they finished second, and "Best Group", where they also finished second. At the BBC Radio 2 Folk Awards 2010, the duo won the award for "Best Duo" and the title song of the album won the award for "Best Original Song". Knightley received the award for the song by poet Ian McMillan. World Music noted that the song "not surprisingly resonated with a lot of the population".

On 3 August 2010, they released an exclusive live version of the song recorded backstage at Cambridge Folk Festival as they met up with Mike Harding of BBC Radio 2. This version was only uploaded on to the BBC's folk blog. In February 2011, the band performed the song on The Andrew Marr Show, where they "serenaded" William Hague with it. In November 2010, the band released their next album, a set of cover versions entitled Covers 2 which featured re-recordings of two of the songs from Arrogance Ignorance and Greed; the title track was recorded in a self-proclaimed "'lite' version" entitled "AIG 2", whilst their cover of Gabriel's "Secret World" was also re-recorded. Independent record label Nascente included "The Keys to Canterbuy" on their various artists compilation album Beginner's Guide to English Folk (2012).

== Track listing ==
All tracks written by Steve Knightley, except where noted.

1. "Lowlands" (Traditional; arranged by Knightley and Phil Beer) – 2:21
2. "Evolution" – 3:26
3. "The Man I Was" – 3:33
4. "The Napoli" – 3:11
5. "Senor (Tales of Yankee Power)" (Bob Dylan) – 4:13
6. "IED: Science or Nature" – 5:00
7. "The Vale" – 4:47
8. "Arrogance Ignorance and Greed" – 3:40
9. "Secret World" (Peter Gabriel) – 5:06
10. "The Worried Well" – 2:13
11. "The Keys of Canterbury" (Traditional; arranged by Knightley) – 3:44
12. "Drift" – 4:57
13. "Rain Rain Go Away" - 2:25
- The thirteenth song is a hidden, untitled track unlisted in the artwork.

== Chart positions ==
=== Album ===
Chart (2009)	Peak position
UK Albums Chart	170

== Personnel ==
Show of Hands

- Steve Knightley, vocals [1–12], guitar [2, 4, 6, 8], tenor guitar [2–3, 5, 7–10], mandocello [1, 3, 11–12], cuatro [5, 9], harmonica [8];
- Phil Beer, vocals [1, 3–4, 8–11], fiddle [2, 5, 7–8, 11], strings [3, 6, 11–12], mandolin [4, 11], mandocello [6], slide guitar [7], guitar [9–10], cuatro [12];

Guest contributors

- Miranda Sykes, vocals [1–4, 6, 8–12], double bass [1–6, 8–12];
- Andy Tween, cajon [2, 11], percussion [2, 11], drums [6, 8];
- Stu Hanna, guitar [2, 8];
- Jim Causley, vocals [4];
- David Delarre, vocals [4], guitar [4];
- James Delarre, vocals [4], fiddle [4];
- Debbie Hanna, vocals [6, 12];
- Matt Clifford, piano [6, 12], Hammond B3 [8], keyboards [8];
- Jackie Oates, vocals [7,11]
