= Covers 2 (Show of Hands album) =

Studio album by Show of Hands with Miranda Sykes
- Released: 17 November 2010
- Recorded: October 2010
- Studio: Riverside Studios, Exeter, Devon
- Genre: Folk; acoustic
- Length: 51:33
- Label: Hands on Music
- Producer: Mark Tucker

Show of Hands with Miranda Sykes chronology
Arrogance Ignorance and Greed (2009)	Covers 2 (2010)	Backlog 2 (2011)

Covers 2 is the fourteenth studio album by British folk duo Show of Hands. An official collaboration with double bassist and vocalist Miranda Sykes, who had been the duo's unofficial third member for six years, it is the duo's second album of cover versions, following Covers (2000). The album was intended for "friends and fans" of the duo, and an attempt to record songs that the duo had played live for some time. The album was produced by Mark Tucker and recorded as a mostly "straightforward" recording with little overdubs or extra production work.

The album was released in mid-November 2010 as a limited-edition album to be sold from the duo's Autumn tour that promoted the album, and was also released for a short time on the duo's website. As such, the album was not released in the shops or as a download. The album was a critical success, with Spiral Earth commending it as "the sound of one of the finest duos in English roots music having a blast".

== Background ==
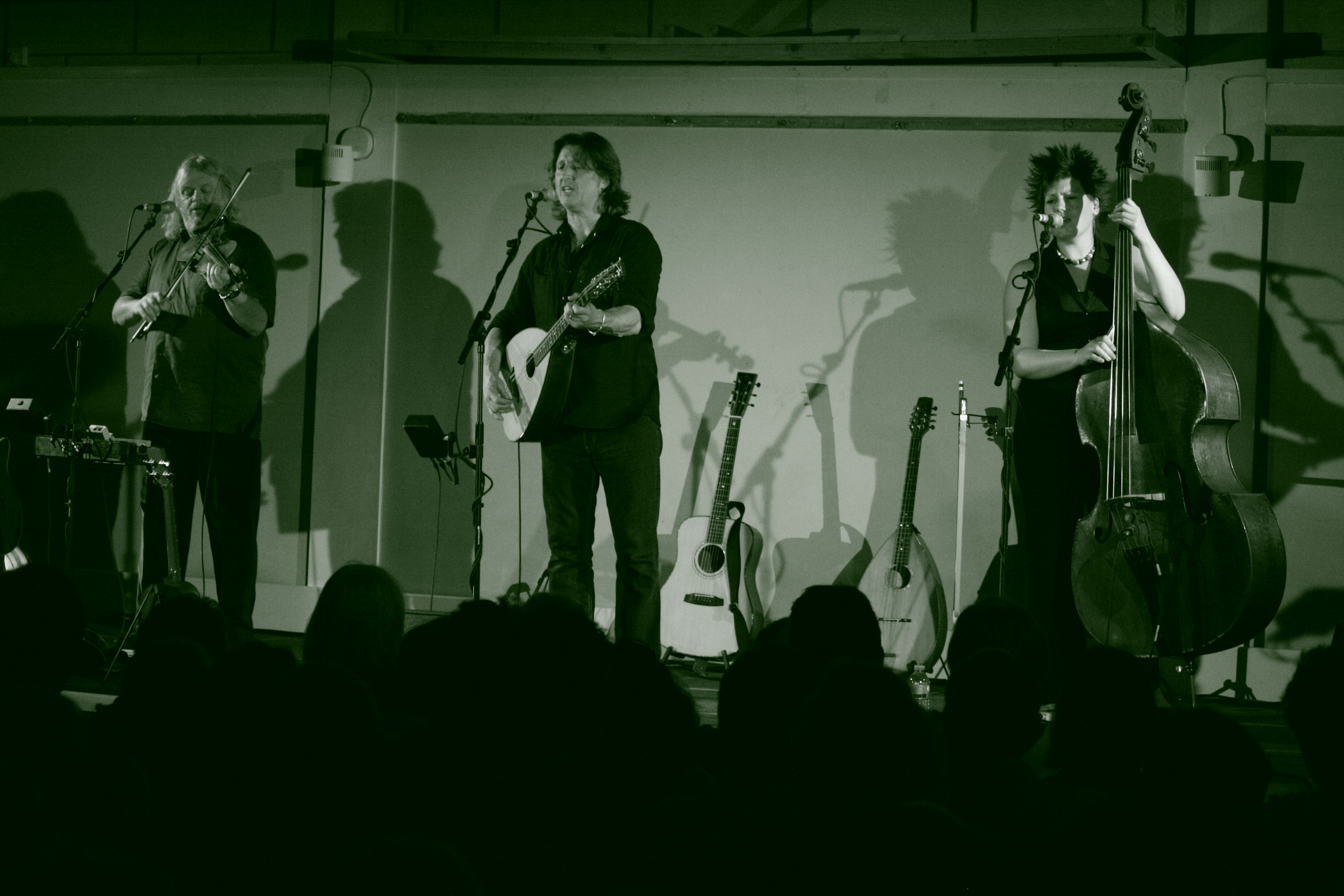
This album is the duo's first studio album to be billed as a collaboration with Miranda Sykes.

In 2009, Show of Hands released their fourteenth studio album Arrogance Ignorance and Greed, produced by Stu Hanna of the English folk duo Megson, with additional production by Mark Tucker. The album followed a painfully emotion period for Steve Knightley where members of his family battled serious illnesses, which led to the album becoming particularly personal and darker than previous Show of Hands albums, aided by Hanna's direct and sharp production. The album was also very politically concerned. The album was released to a positive critical reception, many praising the darker tone to the album, although Phil Beer of the duo stated that the album did not sit well with several fans. The album entered the UK Album Chart at number 170, becoming their first album to chart.

In 2010, the duo performed a live cover version of Don Henley's hit "The Boys of Summer" on the Radcliffe & Maconie show on BBC Radio 6 Music. The performance was acclaimed and prompted the duo to record an album of cover versions, their second after Covers (2000), or third including the traditional folk music release Folk Music (1998). Covers was recorded as a "straightforward" album without any multitracking or overdubs, whilst Folk Music was only released as a limited edition album for the duo's fan club mailing order and at the band's live performances for a short time. Thus, they decided their new album of cover versions should have an influence from both feats. The duo named the album Covers 2 and set for a mid-November release.

== Music ==
"Covers Two is personal collection of sound-check fragments, late-night party pieces and mid-song references finally captured as complete songs. We have tried to be as true as possible to the ‘Live-trio’ format with minimal overdubs and production tweaking. The album was recorded in three sessions in October 2010 at Mick Burch’s Riverside studio in Exeter with the forensic ears of Mark Tucker assessing every note."

— Steve Knightley referring to the album.

The duo said the album was recorded for "friends and fans only". The album contains twelve cover versions and one original track and is intended as a sequel to the band's earlier album Covers (2000). It was recorded over seven days in three sessions at Riverside Studios, Exeter, in October 2010. The album was produced and engineered by the duo's regular producer and engineer Mark Tucker. Whilst the duo's previous two albums featured Miranda Sykes as a large guest contributor, Covers 2 is presented as a collaboration album between the duo and her. The album intentionally stays "very close" to the duo's live sound of the duo and Sykes (their "live-trio" sound), and to achieve this, minimal overdubs and few production changes were made to the album. This follows in the footsteps of Covers, which featured no overdubs or production changes at all, whilst UK Folk Music opted not to refer to the album as folk music but rather acoustic music.

Spiral Earth observed that some of the cover versions were played at the band's live gigs over the previous couple of years, and that "recording them is the right thing to do as they have gone beyond the status of filler material and their versions are something special." They noted that, as the duo "often bring cover versions into their live sets to great audience approval, collecting them together on an album is a great chance to hear those moments that otherwise would be lost." The BBC said the album contained "favourite songs" that exemplify Knightley's admiration or "great pop writers", whilst Bradley Torreano of Allmusic noted the album's "diverse repertoire." Both members of the duo, Steve Knightley and Phil Beer, sing lead vocals fairly across the album. The album opens with a cover of Richard Shindell's "You Stay Here", featuring Syke's "brooding bowed double bass that resonates chillingly beneath Steve's anguished vocals". The cover of Mark Knopfler's "Tunnel of Love" (1980) is "transformed into something completely different", whilst the cover of Tom Robinson"2-4-6-8 Motorway" was described as a "blast" showing the duo "imbue King of El Paso with more Texas menace than a couple of Devon boys have any right to." Their cover of Peter Gabriel's "Secret World", which Gabriel had composed for his album Us (1992), was previously recorded and released by Show of Hands for their previous album Arrogance Ignorance and Greed (2009), before being re-recorded for Covers 2. The album also contains an acoustic re-recording of the title track from Arrogance Ignorance and Greed, with its name changed to "AIG 2" and subtitled "The 'Lite' Version". The song is the only song on the album that is not a cover version, instead being a Knightley composition.

== Release ==
Professional ratings
Review scores
Source	Rating
Spiral Earth	4/5 stars
UK Folk Music	favourable

The duo said to reflect that the album was recorded for "friends and fans only", it would only be sold at the duo's gigs and by mail order, and would not be available through shops or as a download. This follows in the footsteps of their previous album Folk Music (1998), which was also only released in that way. The duo began a small tour in promotion of Covers 2 in November–December 2010 under the unofficial name of "the Autumn tour", which began on 17 November with a performance at Salisbury. The album was first made available when the duo sold the album at the performances, and they would also sign copies at each performance. After the inaugural Salisbury performance, copies were dispatched to those who had pre-ordered the album on the duo's website. The duo's own record label Hands on Music was credited as the album's label.

The tour featured Texan guitarist Rodney Branigan as a support act. On 10 November, the duo appeared on the BBC Radio Cambridge show Sue Dougan in the Afternoon and the BBC Radio Manchester and Lancashire show John Barnes Evening Show to promote the album and tour. Barnes interviewed the duo before they played a song from the album live. On 22 November, the duo added samples of three of the album's tracks to their website. On 26 November, Steve Knightley of the duo appeared on the BBC Radio Bristol show Drivetime with Ben Prater to promote their performance at Bristol's Colston Hall later the same day and to talk about the duo's plans for 2011. Spiral Earth ran a competition in which three winners could win a copy of Covers 2 and see three of the duo's performances on the tour.

Although not many critics reviewed the album because of its limited edition nature, those that did review the album published positive reviews. Iain Hazlewood of Spiral Earth rated the album four stars out of five and said the album is "a refreshing back to basics affair" and concluded that "Covers 2 is the sound of one of the finest duos in English roots music having a blast, it's impossible not to be swept along with them". The magazine also said that the album is "one of those under the radar gems that comes along every so often," and as being "chuffin' marvellous". Pete Fyfe of UK Folk Music told readers: "If this is your first dip into the world of acoustic music (I'm not even going to try using the word 'folk' anymore) then you've come to the right place". A month after the album's release, Beer was nominated for "Musician of the Year" at the 2011 Spiral Earth Awards.

== Track listing ==
Original artists written next to the song title

1. "You Stay Here" – Richard Shindell
2. "Youngstown" – Bruce Springsteen
3. "Dakota" – Stereophonics
4. "Boys of Summer" – Don Henley
5. "The Devil's Right Hand" – Steve Earle
6. "Tunnel of Love" – Dire Straits
7. "Secret World" – Peter Gabriel (A different version than the one featured on Arrogance Ignorance and Greed)
8. "2-4-6-8 Motorway" – Tom Robinson
9. "King of El Paso" – Boz Scaggs
10. "Cocaine Blues" – Rev. Gary Davis
11. "First and Last" – Roscarrock
12. "No Woman, No Cry" – Bob Marley
13. "AIG 2" the ‘lite’ version – Show of Hands (A differently titled re-recording of "Arrogance, Ignorance & Greed")
