= Edgelarks =

English folk music duo

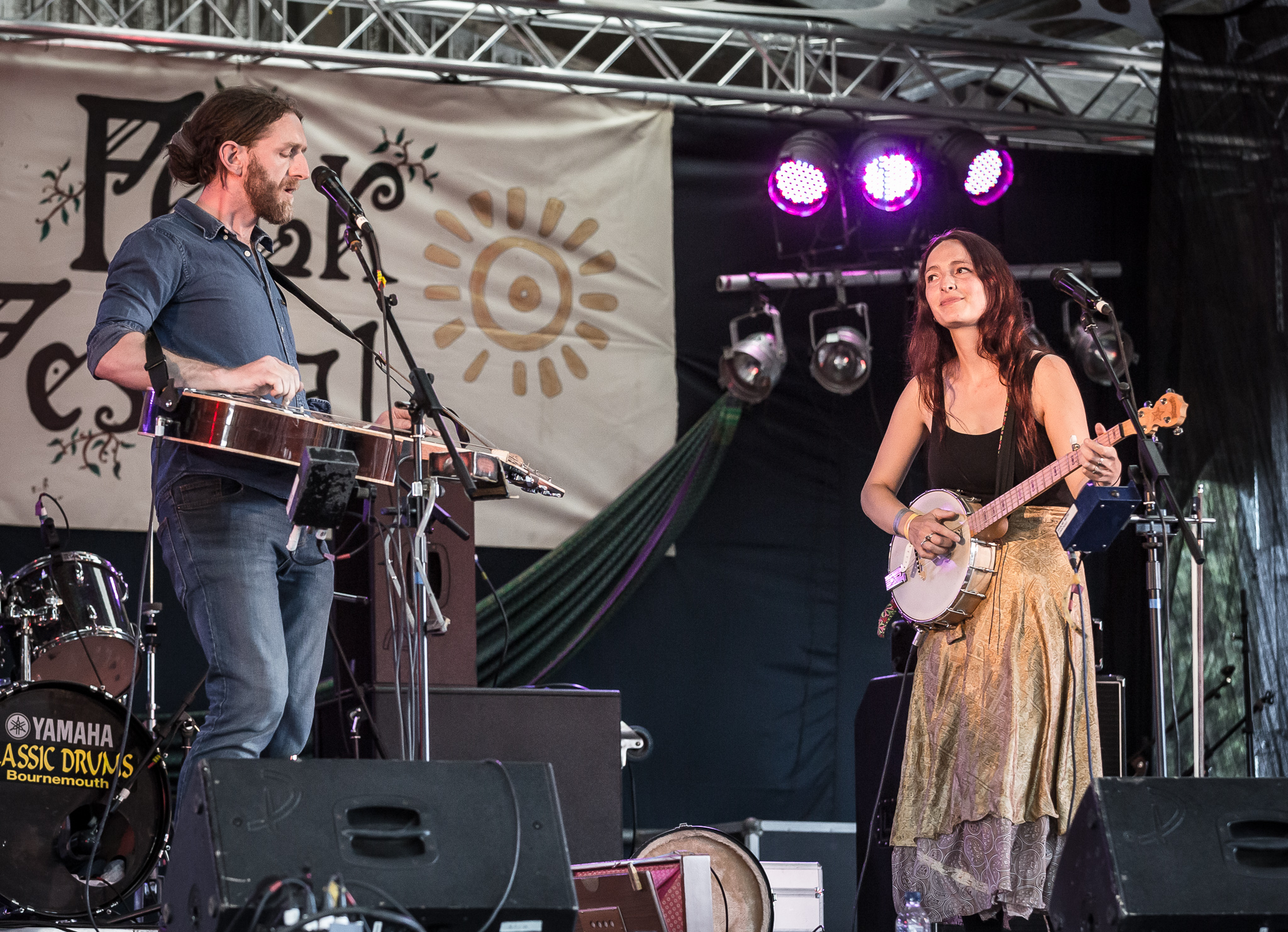
- in August 2021 at the Purbeck Valley Folk Festival

Background information
- Genres: Folk music
- Years active: 2010–present
- Members: Phillip Henry; Hannah Martin

Phillip Henry and Hannah Martin are an English folk music duo. In 2017, they renamed themselves Edgelarks and released an eponymous album.

== Career ==
In 2008, Henry travelled to Calcutta to study under the slide guitarist Pandit Debashish Bhattacharya. When Henry returned, he joined the band The Roots Union, with Martin, which spent three years on the road. The band came to an end in 2010, and Henry and Martin continued working together. They were "discovered" by Show of Hands frontman Steve Knightley who first encountered the duo busking on the seafront during Devon's Sidmouth Folk Week.

The duo won "Best Folk Act" in the 2013 South West Music Awards, Best Duo title in the 2013 Spiral Earth Awards and Best Duo at the 2014 BBC Radio 2 Folk Awards. They have subsequently been nominated a further two times at the BBC Folk Awards, in 2016 and 2018.

Henry and Martin work with Peter Knight's Gigspanner Trio and John Spiers to form the six piece Gigspanner Big Band. They are also members of the folk disco project, The Band of Love.

== Hannah Martin ==
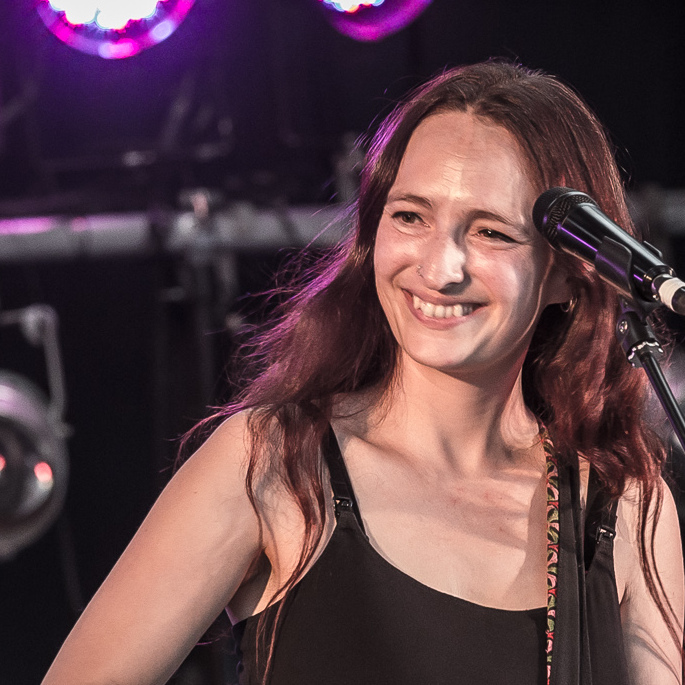
Hannah Martin

Martin is a singer-songwriter and multi-instrumentalist from Devon. Writing on fiddle, viola, and banjo, and drawing on UK traditions, she has been commended by Mike Harding. 2012 saw Martin selected to be part of the National Theatre's War Horse School, working with John Tams, Nancy Kerr, John Kirkpatrick and Chris Parkinson. She was also involved in The Nursery Rhyme Project for the Bristol Old Vic, co-writing and performing in a show exploring one of our oldest oral traditions. She worked with Greg Russell, Nancy Kerr, Tim Yates, and Findlay Napier on the protest song project Shake The Chains.

Martin also performs with Show of Hands' Miranda Sykes in the folk duo SykesMartin.

== Philip Henry ==
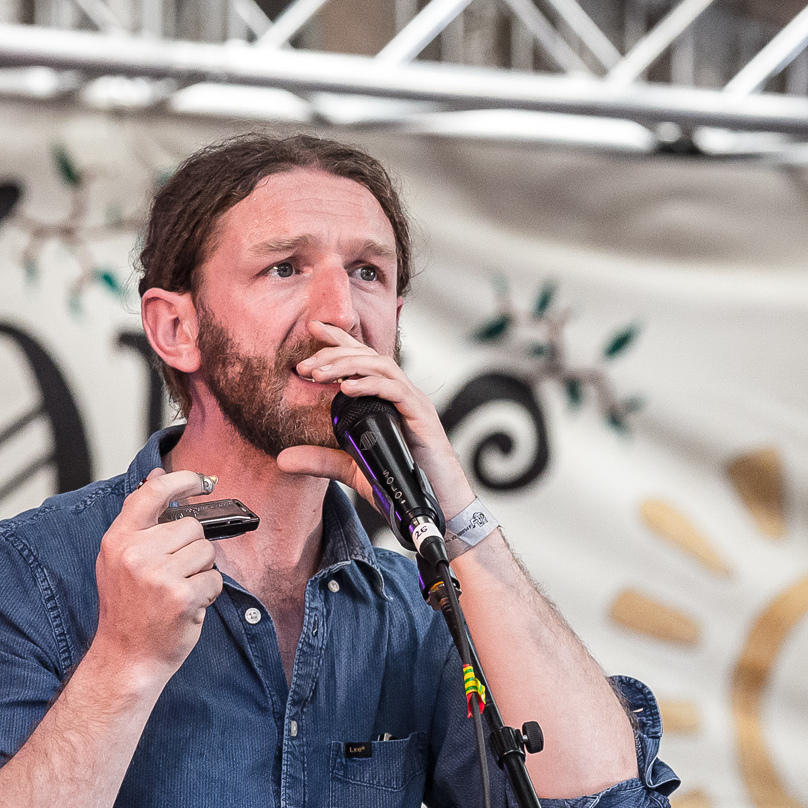
Philip Henry

Henry is a slide guitarist and harmonica player from Lancashire. He has studied the music of the Deep South of America, of the British Isles, and India. He specialises in lap slide guitar while his harmonica style combines country blues and folk styles with beat-boxing.

== Selected discography ==
- Singing The Bones (2011)
- Mynd (2013)
- Live In Calstock (2014)
- Watershed (2015)
- Edgelarks (2017)
- Folk Fever (2018) as The Band of Love
- Feather (2019)
- Henry Martin (2020)

== Awards ==
- Best Duo 2013 Spiral Earth awards
- Best Folk Act 2013 South West Music Awards
- BBC Radio 2 Folk Awards (2014)
