= Wake the Union =

Studio album by Show of Hands
- Released: 15 October 2012
- Recorded: 2012
- Studios: Phil's Music Room, Devon; The Green Room, Devon; Highlands Farm Barn
- Genres: Folk; Americana; English folk
- Length: 56:50
- Label: Hands on Music
- Producer: Mark Tucker

Show of Hands chronology
Backlog 2 (2011)	Wake the Union (2012)	Centenary: Words & Music of the Great War (2014)

Wake the Union is the sixteenth studio album by British folk duo Show of Hands. Although their fifteenth studio album, it is their eighth in their "canon" of studio albums (albums of new, lyrical material still in print). The release follows the successful Arrogance Ignorance and Greed (2009) and the limited edition albums Covers 2 (2010) and Backlog 2 (2011). Recorded and produced by Mark Tucker, the album takes a strong influence from both English and American folk music and was created as a "journey through of [the two countries'] landscapes united by a common tongue and musical heritage". The album again features their unofficial third member Miranda Sykes. The album was also described by Knightley as a direct continuation of Arrogance Ignorance and Greed, although critics saw it as very distinct in its own right. The album was also a 20th anniversary celebration for the duo.

Released in October 2012 by the band's own label Hands on Music, it charted at number 73 in the UK Albums Chart, some 100 higher places than their only other album to chart at the time, Arrogance Ignorance and Greed. It was released to very positive reviews from critics, with some touting it as the duo's best album. The duo toured in promotion of the album from 2012 to 2014, although several songs from the album had debuted live in 2010. A 7-inch single featuring alternative versions of "Aunt Maria" and "King of the World" was released in 2013, whilst a rockumentary documenting the making of the album, Making the Waking, was released as a double-feature DVD release in 2013 with a concert film taken from the album's promotional tour, Live at Shrewsbury, which was a collaboration with the Urban Soul Orchestra.

== Background ==
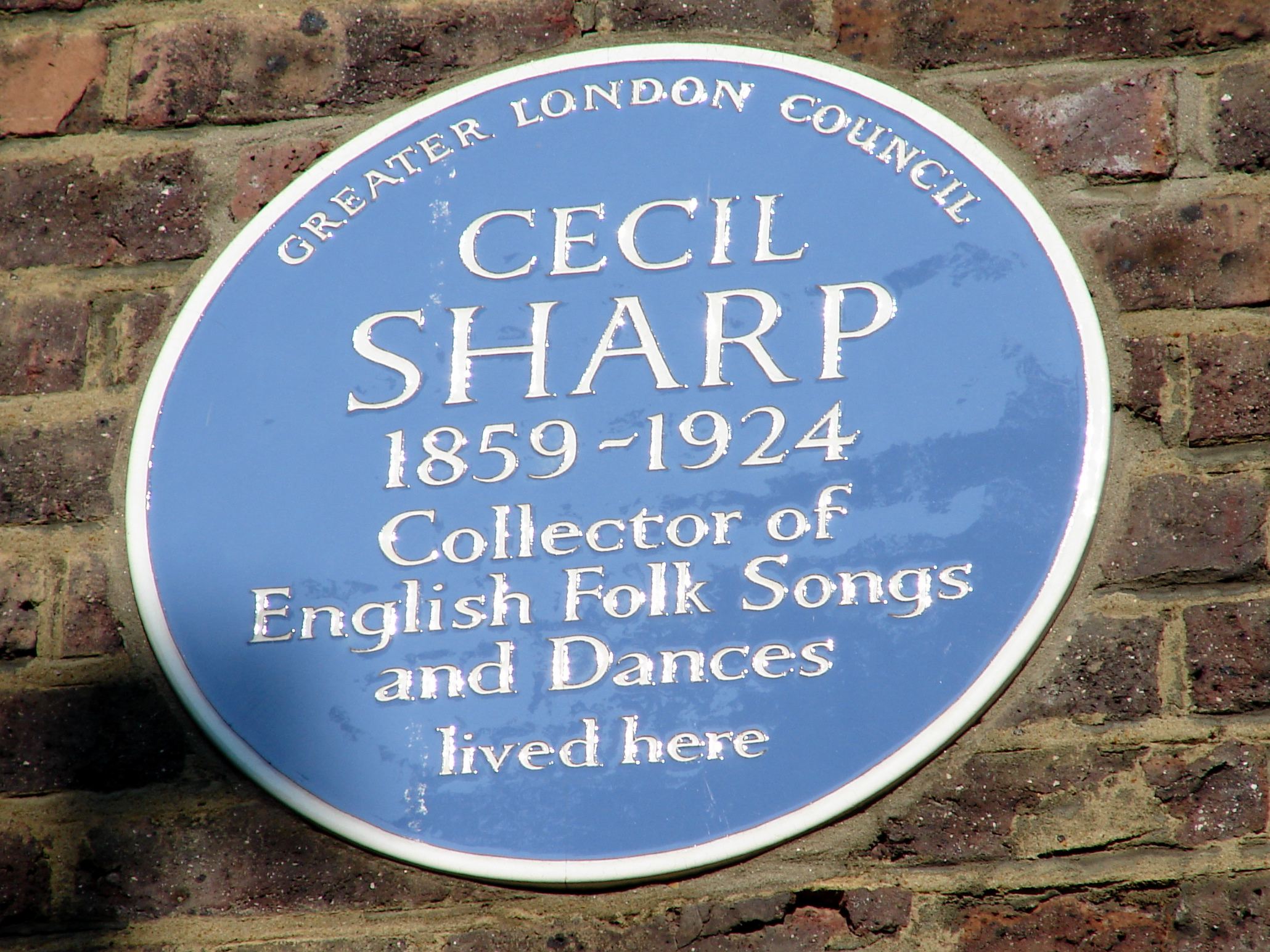
Knightley took part in the Cecil Sharp Project in early 2012 to celebrate Cecil Sharp.

Show of Hands released their fourteenth studio album Arrogance Ignorance and Greed in 2009. The album was the second consecutive release by the band produced by an "outside producer", namely Stu Hanna of the English folk duo Megson, with additional production by Mark Tucker. The album followed a painfully emotion period for Steve Knightley where members of his family battled serious illnesses. This led to the album becoming particularly personal and darker than previous Show of Hands albums, aided by Hanna's direct and sharp production. The album was also very politically concerned. The album was released to a positive critical reception, many praising the darker tone to the album, although Phil Beer of the duo stated that the album did not sit well with several fans. The album entered the UK Album Chart at number 170, becoming their first album to chart. In 2010, the duo recorded their second album of cover versions, Covers 2, for a limited edition release, and recorded a collection of re-recordings of older material, Backlog 2, in 2011.

Meanwhile, the duo had decided to change their sound for their next release, and to take part in the production of the album, something the duo had not done since Country Life (2003). They decided to re-hire Mark Tucker as co-producer. In January 2012, Knightley took part in the Cecil Sharp Project, a commission that included Knightley to create new material based on the life and collections of the founding father of the English folk revival Cecil Sharp. Knightley's musical focus became more evident in its American influence, and this would dominate the following album. After a year away from studio recording in 2011, the band recorded the album in 2012, over three different recording studios; Phil's Music Room in Devon, The Green Room, Devon and Highlands Farm Barn. The album was mastered at Masterblaster Audio Mastering in Canalot Studios, London. The working name of the album was Who Gets to Feel Good, but was later changed to Wake the Union.

== Music and lyrics ==
=== Style ===
The album's musical palette was focused on the folk music of the United Kingdom and the United States.

Produced by Mark Tucker, Wake the Union is a crossover between English folk music and Americana and is a non-narrative concept album about the two countries. Born out of the duo's love of both English and North American acoustic and roots music, the album was described by the duo as taking "a journey through the heart of two landscapes united by a common tongue and musical heritage." The album feature themes and styles that alternate between the two countries. The band's website says that the album sees the duo "weave a touch of folk, a hint of blues and a pinch of country" into the album. UK Folk Music noted that "with more than a touch of Americana liberally sprinkled throughout the recording and images of Dust Bowl tumbleweed blowing about courtesy of sampled instruments," the album could provide the band an American breakthrough. Northern Sky observed that although Knightley is known for his "distinctly English songs, the material on Wake the Union tends to straddle the border of what we now know as Americana in places, but with the band's British acoustic roots still showing." The Financial Times said the album shows the duo return with "less anger and more music ranging from jazz shuffles to slide guitar baiting". Folk Radio also observed that some tracks contain influences of the Cecil Sharp Project, a commission that included Knightley to create new material based on the life and collections of the founding father of the English folk revival Cecil Sharp.

Knightley also stated that the album intentionally carries on where the band's previous Knightley-composed album Arrogance Ignorance and Greed had left off. The album was also described by the duo as their "20th anniversary" album. Whilst the duo had become Show of Hands in 1987, it was not until 1992 that they would record their first canonical album. Concerning the album's lyrics, Folk Radio observed that there is "a liberal sprinkling of death and desertion throughout the songs, but this is folk music, the body count is always high." David Kidman of NetRhythms has said that the album contains "acerbic topical and social commentary through historical storytelling to evocative Americana, throwing in traditional-style folk-romance, matters of the heart and work arising from special projects along the way, all the while meaningfully interweaving key influences and inspirations yet making the resultant creations uniquely their own. And that's a hell of a skill to have developed." The album features numerous guest musicians, including the duo's unofficial "third member" Miranda Sykes on double bass and vocals, alongside Martin Simpson, Seth Lakeman, BJ Cole, Andy Cutting, Bellowhead's Paul Sartin, Cormac Byrne and Leonard Podolak.

=== Composition ===
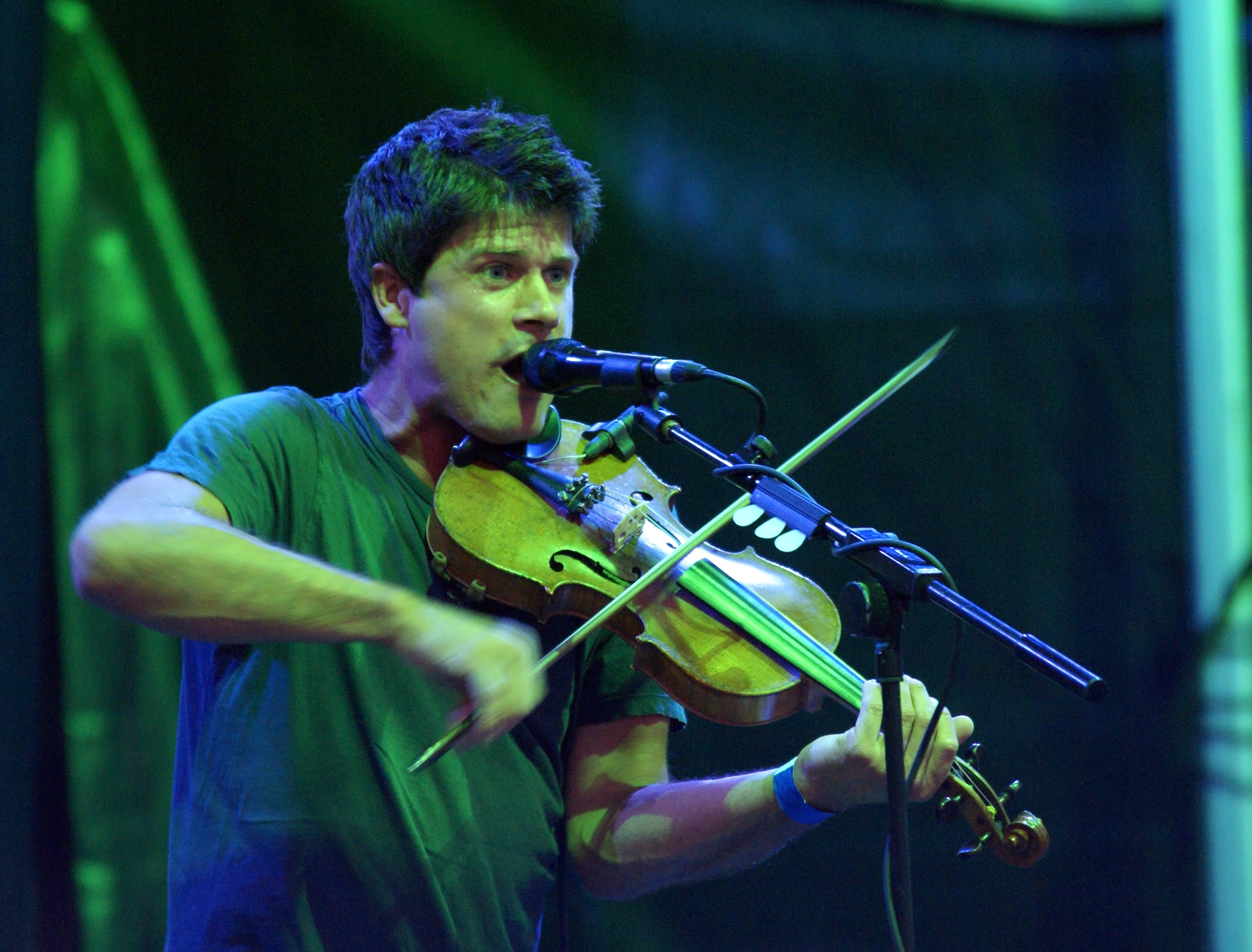
The album's opening song "Haunt You" features and was co-written by Seth Lakeman (pictured).

Co-written between Knightley and the song's guest musician Seth Lakeman, the opening song, "Haunt You", is a "hard-hitting and spiteful" song with "bitter recrimination". The laidback blues-styled "Company Town" is reminiscent of "Buddy Can You Spare A Dime?". It features a jazz shuffle that has been compared to Richard Thompson, and has been described as a lyrical continuation of the themes from Arrogance Ignorance and Greed. The song features Paul Sartin of Bellowhead's Cor Anglais and Paul Downes performing tenor banjo. "Now You Know" showcases the duo's lighter side and was a concert regular for the duo for several years prior to the album's release. David Kidman of NetRhythms described it as "one of Knightley's solid-gold-classic romantic dilemma-songs". "Katrina", written by fellow Topsham songwriter Chris Hoban, is about the tragedy of Hurricane Katrina, and features Leonard Podolak's 5 string banjo and the dobro of Phil Henry creating an ethereal backdrop. The titular river of "Cruel River" is the River Dart and is a re-recording of the song originally featured on Knightley's solo album Cruel River (2007).

"Aunt Maria", which features slide guitar from Martin Simpson, is about the titular Aunt meeting song collector Cecil Sharp. The song originated from Knightley's involvement in Cecil Sharp Project in January 2012, where he developed material with British and American musicians to celebrate Cecil Sharp's Appalachian song gathering. The BBC said that "Maria allows her song to be recorded and her history told, but is uneasy about the difference in class between herself and Sharp, and anxious that she shouldn't be the only one to whom the collector talks. "There's lots more folk like me, sir," Knightly sings as Maria. "Why don't you come and see, sir?"." As with "Katrina", the song features Leonard Podolak performing a 5-string banjo. Sykes interjects two verses from the traditional song "Bonnie Light Horseman" into the album's seventh song "Coming Home", "subtly complicating [the] otherwise simple tale of a family's bad seed." The song is a "telling snapshot of the Afghan war campaign." "Reunion Hill" is about a Civil War window, and is a cover of Richard Shindell's Prairie ballad. "No Man's Land" is a "sparsely-scored genuine-angst-ridden slow-burner" dedicated to the late Jackie Leven.

The tenth track is the duo's cover of Bob Dylan's lesser-known cowboy song "Seven Curses". "Home to a Million Thoughts" is a song of "simple wistful nostalgia" written as a commission for the reopening of Exeter's Royal Albert Memorial Museum. "Who Gets to Feel Good" is a country-waltzer that demonstrates Knightley's" skill in transposing the perils of love to the indigenous American musical idiom". "Stop Copying Me" is a tongue-in-cheek song that turns a suspicious eye on the life virtual and digital. After "King of the World" is the album's concluding song, "Thanks", which was used as the band's concert closer.

== Release and promotion ==
Wake the Union was released on 15 October 2012 by the band's own record label Hands on Music. The album underwent long promotional campaigns. "Now You Know" and "Stop Copying Me" were both first played live in 2010, and became concert standards for the duo. Other songs from this album debuted live in August 2012 during the album's promotional tour, including "Haunt Me", which was performed at Beautiful Days during the same bill that included Lakeman. The album was touted as the duo's "20th anniversary celebration". The duo toured in promotion of the album from 2012 to 2013. The duo made several radio appearances to promote the album, including on Simon Mayo's Drivetime show on BBC Radio 2 on 6 March 2013. In December 2012, the duo appeared on Brooklands Radio's Mainly Folk programme in a special interview feature. "Now You Know" was included on the station's "Mainly Folk Playlist". The duo's performance of "Company Town" on Mark Radcliffe's BBC Radio 2 show was included on the compilation album The Mark Radcliffe Folk Sessions 2013, released in November 2013.

Different versions of the songs "Aunt Maria" and "King of the World" were released as a 7-inch single by Proper Records in 2013. The songs were remixed by their original producer, Mark Tucker, and the single was the duo's first vinyl release. In Autumn 2013, a behind-the-scenes "making of" rockumentary about the album, entitled Making the Waking, was released as a DVD set with a concert film of the duo entitled Live from Shrewsbury. Mark Tucker also provided the role of producer for the documentary. The DVD set, entitled simply Live at Shrewsbury / Making the Waking, was the band's first DVD release since 2007. The Live at Shrewsbury concert is a collaboration between the duo and the Urban Soul Orchestra, who act as the duo's prolific backing band, and was recorded at Shrewsbury Folk Festival. Knightley also released Songbook 5: Wake the Union in 2013 at the start of his solo tour, a songbook containing all fourteen songs he composed for Wake the Union, as well as material from Covers 2, his solo album Live in Somerset, and The Cuatro Tracks bonus material−seven tracks originally written and arranged for cuatro and ukulele.

=== Album cover ===
The A303 road sign is one of the symbols featured on the album cover.

The album cover, created by design agency Stylorogue, and Mark Higenbottam, features a cotton-stringed acoustic guitar adorned with various English and North American symbols, reflecting the English and American themes of the album. The symbols featured vary, such as highway road signs (the signs for U.S. Route 66 and the A303), national flags (the United Kingdom and the United States), other national symbols (such as the Statue of Liberty and the Royal Air Force roundel) as well as folk performers, including Woody Guthrie and his "This machine kills fascists" guitar. Elsewhere in the packaging is photography from Rob O'Connor, and the album's lyrics.

The album cover was highlighted in several reviews. Folk Radio said that a glance at the album cover "leaves no doubt as to [the duo's] intention, there's the Union Jack and the Stars and Stripes, Woody Guthrie's guitar still promising to kill fascists, and you can head west on the highway that's the best, that's either Route 66 or the A303, your choice. This showcasing of both English and American roots to the music is surely no surprise from Phil Beer given his solo and Phil Beer Band output. But it's maybe less expected from Steve Knightley, many of whose strongest songs resonate with a sense of place that is not just English but quintessentially West Country." Northern Sky said that "the cover shot of a well-travelled guitar maps out the journey these songs represent with little or no ambiguity." UK Folk Music commended the album cover as "stunning art design". Grem Devlin of The Living Tradition made note of the album's overall packaging, saying "as usual the packaging is excellent – indeed a lyrics book where us mere mortals can actually read the words without the need for a microscope." The album was a runner-up in fRoots' list of the top five "Best Packaged Albums of 2012".

== Reception ==
Professional ratings
Review scores
Source	Rating
BBC Music	(favourable)
Financial Times	4/5 stars
Folk Radio	(favourable)
The Living Tradition	(favourable)
NetRhythms	(favourable)
Northern Sky	4/5 stars
The Scotsman	4/5 stars
The Daily Telegraph	4/5 stars
UK Folk Music	(10/10)

The album was released to a very favourable critical reception. BBC Music were positive about the album, saying that "it's unlikely to win over many new fans, but those already under the band's wingspan are, once again, richly rewarded with another thought-provoking collection." The Daily Telegraph rated the album with four stars out of five said "The success of Wake The Union is in blending the band's trademark British folk with Americana. Knightley (part of the trio that includes Phil Beer and double bassist Miranda Sykes) describes it as "a journey through the heart of two landscapes united by a common tongue and musical heritage." The Financial Times published a four star review saying "The duo returns with less anger and more music ranging from jazz shuffles to slide guitar baiting."

Folk Radio said that "Wake the Union comes across as a return not just to their musical roots but also to pleasing this core audience. In contrast to AIG, and previous album Witness, both Phil and Steve took a full part in the production of Wake the Union, alongside named producer Mark Tucker. So, whilst the material ranges widely in its geography, the sound is unmistakably that of Devon's finest." David Kidman of NetRhythms concluded that "Wake the Union is definitely another milestone in Show Of Hands' already stunningly illustrious career." Pete Fyfe of UK Folk Music rated the album "unreservedly ten out of ten" and said that "personally for me this album really is a turning point in my appreciation for all things American styled and congratulations must go to the other musicians involved in the project." Norman Chalmers's review for The Scotsman singled out "Haunt You" as a song that readers should download and rated the album four stars out of five. Singer-songwriter Mike Harding said on BBC Radio 2 that "they've made a shedload of great albums...this is their best album," whilst radio DJ and television presenter Simon Mayo said that "Wake the Union is one fine album". Similarly, the album's producer Mark Tucker said the album had been "repeatedly hailed" as "their best yet". The Daily Telegraph included the album in its unordered list of the "Best Folk Music Albums of 2012". In January 2013, the duo were nominated in the Songlines Music Awards.

The album charted at number 73 in the UK Album Chart, becoming their second album to chart after Arrogance Ignorance and Greed, which reached number 170. Earlier in the week, it had charted in the Midweek Charts at number 35. Nonetheless, the duo were not concerned with charting on the UK Album Charts. When asked by Alt Blackpool if they would hope their following album would reach the top 10, Steve Knightley replied: "No, not at all. It doesn't mean anything. People get to number one because the record companies give away one free with every one that's bought so it's a big con. We're more concerned with selling to people at gigs and selling regularly at realistic prices so it's a nice PR thing every now and then but it doesn't mean much."

== Track listing ==
All songs written by Steve Knightley except where noted.

1. "Haunt You" (with Seth Lakeman)
2. "Company Town"
3. "Now You Know"
4. "Katrina" (Chris Hoban)
5. "Cruel River"
6. "Aunt Maria" (with The Cecil Sharp Project)
7. "Coming Home"
8. "Reunion Hill" (Richard Shindell)
9. "No Man's Land"
10. "Seven Curses" (Bob Dylan)
11. "Home to a Million Thoughts"
12. "Who Gets to Feel Good"
13. "Stop Copying Me"
14. "King of the World"
15. "Thanks"

== Charts ==
Chart (2012)	Peak position
UK Albums Chart	73
UK Independent Albums (Official Charts)	14
