= Witness (Show of Hands album) =

Studio album by Show of Hands
- Released: 15 May 2006
- Recorded: January 2006
- Studio: Presshouse Studio, Colyton, Devon
- Genre: Folk; world; worldbeat; world fusion
- Length: 54:56
- Label: Hands on Music
- Producer: Simon Emmerson and Simon ‘Mass’ Massey

Show of Hands chronology
As You Were (2005)	Witness (2006)	Arrogance Ignorance and Greed (2009)

Singles from Dark Fields
- 1. ""Witness" / "If I Needed Someone"" Released: 2006; 2. ""Roots"" Released: 2007

Witness is the twelfth studio album by British folk duo Show of Hands. The album was recorded in January 2006 at Presshouse Studio, Colyton, Devon, and was produced by Simon Emmerson and Simon ‘Mass’ Massey from the Afro Celts, who helped to incorporate elements of traditional African, ambient and electronic dance music with the duo's characteristic folk style. It was the band's first album in twelve years to use a rhythm section. Lyrically, the album addresses communal and heritage values, and was described by the duo's lead singer Steve Knightley as a "cinematic style journey of the West Country." The album features unofficial third member Miranda Sykes on ten of its twelve tracks.

It was released in May 2006 on the band's Hands on Music label, with the catalogue number HMCD23. Although some fans were perplexed by the duo's new direction, many welcomed it and it received a positive reception from critics. Mojo Magazine ranked Witness at number 10 on their best folk albums of 2006 list. The album became the band's best-selling to date. To promote the album, "Witness", "If I Needed Someone" and "Roots" were singles. The latter also had a music video produced, parts of which were filmed at the Trowbridge Village Pump Festival. The duo toured the album from 2006–2007, culminating in a unique "Tour of Topsham" pubs.

== Background and recording ==
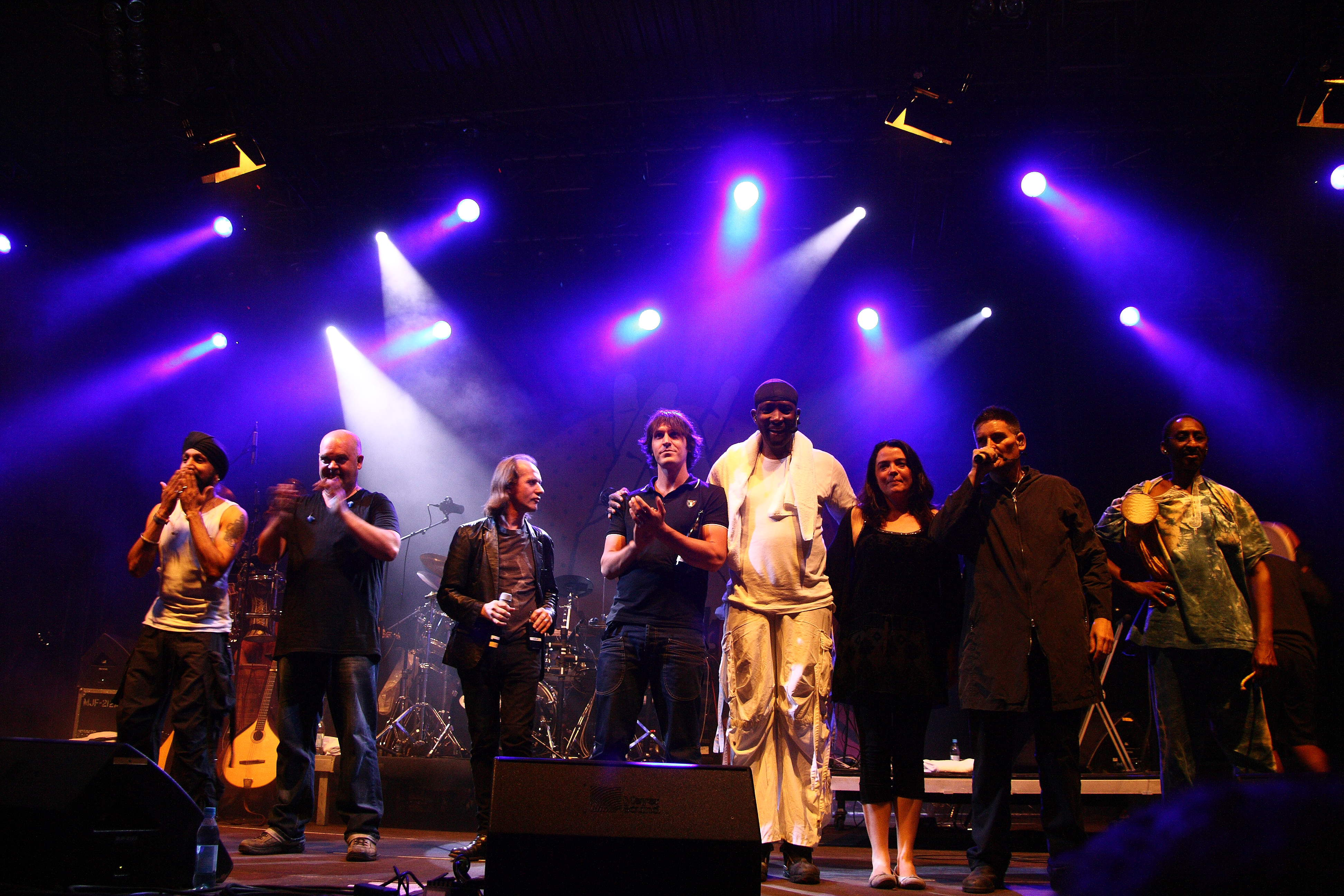
The album was produced by Simon Emmerson and Simon Massey of Afro Celt Sound System (pictured).

Show of Hands had enjoyed in 2003 releasing two albums, the instrumental release The Path and the acclaimed Country Life. Critical praise greeted both releases and the latter brought the band a new wave of attention, with its title song being nominated in the BBC Radio 2 Folk Awards in 2005 and featuring on the accompanying compilation album. That same year, the duo recorded a cover version of The Beatles' "If I Needed Someone" for BBC Radio 2's tribute show and album Rubber Folk, commemorating the 40th anniversary of The Beatles' folk rock album Rubber Soul. Their exposure on Radio 2, the most popular radio station in the United Kingdom, had brought the band the most attention that had up until that point. Country Life was supported by a tour in 2003–04, followed by The Autumn Tour 2004. Miranda Sykes accompanied the band on the tour, playing double bass and performing as a backing vocalist. Although she had collaborated with the band before, the tour marked the first instance of her becoming the unofficial "third member" of Show of Hands. The tour produced the live album As You Were (2005).

For the band's next album, they sought a change in direction, with the duo and Sykes being influenced by numerous other music. They enlisted Simon Emmerson and Simon "Mass" Massey of the multi-genre worldbeat band Afro Celt Sound System to produce their new album. Emmerson, a Grammy-nominated multi-musician, guitarist and DJ, alongside Massey, introduced the band to a more world music and electronic-music influence sound, much mirroring the sound of Afro Celt Sound System, who infuse a wide variation of world music genres, experimenting and electronic technology and instruments. The album was recorded at Presshouse Studio in the small town of Colyton, Devon in January 2006. The album, named Witness, featured Sykes as a full-time unofficial third member, appearing on ten of the album's twelve tracks.

== Music ==
The album marks a departure for the band, featuring the usage of bass and percussion, the second time the band had experimented with them–the first being Beat about the Bush (1994). The album incorporates elements of traditional African, ambient and electronic dance music with the duo's characteristic folk style. Steve Knightley noted "every original song on the CD is a first person narrative or testimonial. Incidents and events are witnessed and recorded and every narrator is a different character. It's really a series of scenes from a cinematic style journey of the West Country." The band's website refers to the album as "the most innovative" studio album the duo had recorded to date, noting the album is Show of Hands "as you've never heard them before". One commentary noted that the album "exemplifies how the digital recording techniques contribute to hybrid musical styles". Phil Beer of the duo said "It's cutting and pasting. You can take something from somewhere and put it anywhere else … so in a chorus of a song if a word sounds funny in one place but fine in another chorus, you cut and paste and see if they dovetail together". [Emmerson] spent hours and hours and hours agonising over where to lay a bell beat: do we put it there or a nanosecond earlier? Because it matters, it actually matters where it falls". The album features numerous guest musicians. Miranda Sykes appears on ten of the album's twelve compositions and features in the album photographs, whilst Massey appears on nine of the tracks, where he is mostly responsible for percussion and drum programming.

"This is where Show of Hands are so damn relevant. From their West Country roots they have picked apart the fabric of our country and are holding up the warp and weft for our inspection. Whether we heed the warning is up to us."

— Ian Hazlewood, Spiral Earth, referring to the lyrics of "Roots".

The album opens with "two punchy, driving songs" which lyrically have been described as "archetypal Steve", both concerning "the intentional desecration of English life of one kind or another". The first song, "Witness", refers to the desecration of life in a commune, whilst the following song "Roots" is an impassioned defence of England's musical heritage and identity, with both songs having been described as showcasing Knightley "venting his anger in lyrics of venom and guts while as ever preaching more tolerance of perfectly reasonable ways of living which just happen to be unorthodox." "Roots" has also been described as being about a "search for identity" "which questions a lot about cultural values, leaving the listener to infer the answers," and as one of Knightley's "acerbic epics". The song was triggered by minister Kim Howells’ comment that his idea of hell was listening to "three Somerset folk singers in the local pub". The chorus of the song is performed by Port Isaac-based shantymen group The Fisherman's Friends. Contrasting the two songs is the third track "The Dive", an "uptempo global workout" about the West Country coastline that has been compared to the Afro Celt Sound System. The song features sounds of the sea at West Bay, Dorset.

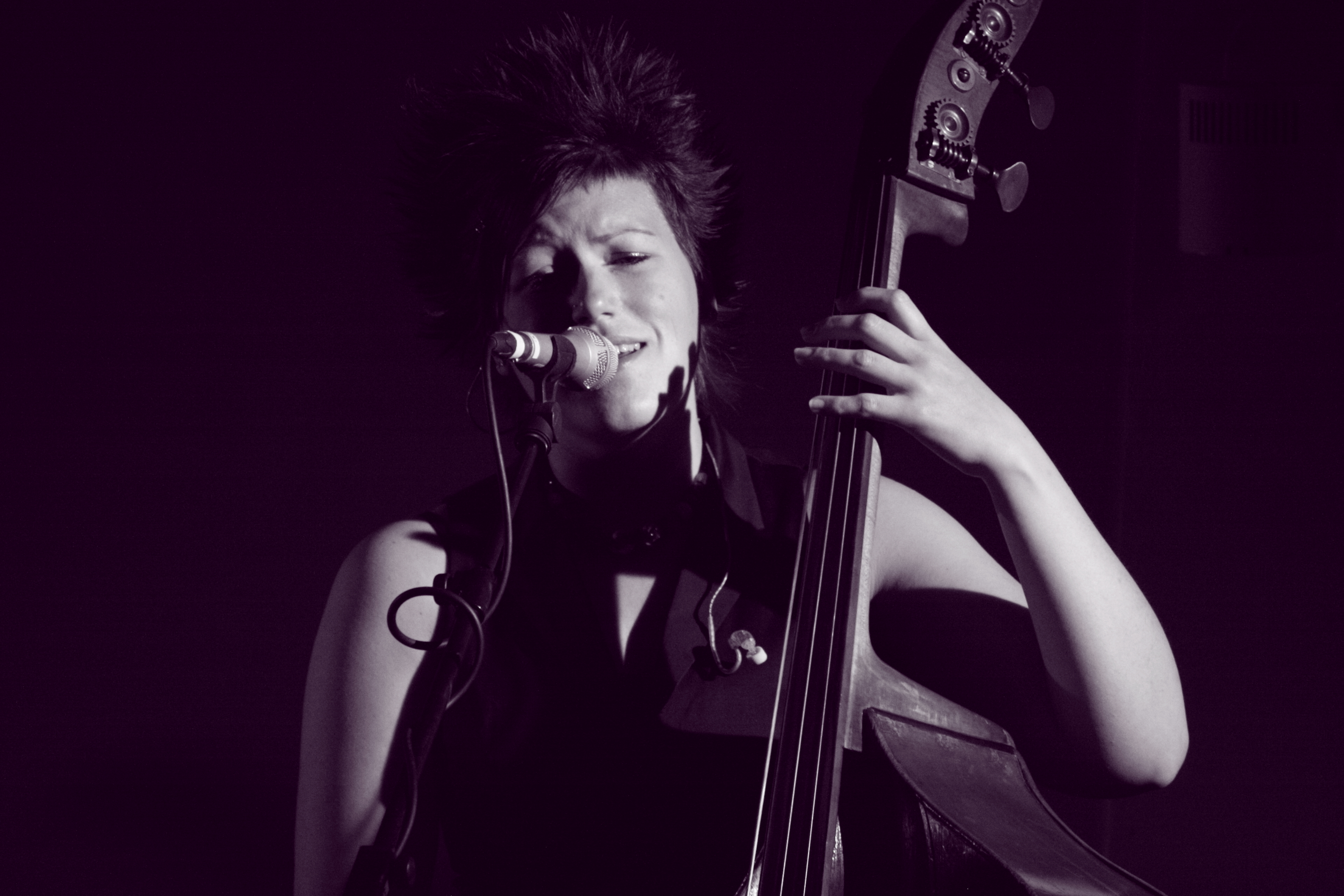
Witness is the first Show of Hands album to feature major contributions from Miranda Sykes (pictured).

"The Falmouth Packet/Haul Away Joe" is a "foot-stomping", "beat-bedecked shanty" sung by Phil Beer. The first part of the piece, "The Falmouth Packet", is an instrumental composed by Beer and recorded originally for his collaborative album The Fiddle Collection (1999). The second part, "Haul Away Joe", is a traditional song arranged by the duo with "ancillary voices" performed by The Fisherman's Friends. "Undertow" is a "bleak tale of hopes and aspirations in small time-life". Beer plays an EBow on the song, giving an "eerie" feel to the song. Massey plays a shaker on the song. The duo's cover of the Beatles' "If I Needed Someone" was originally recorded in 2005 for the BBC Radio 2 show and album Rubber Folk, which celebrated the 40th anniversary of the release of the Beatles' Rubber Soul album. Featuring a distinct Indian music influence, it features British-Indian percussionist Johnny Kalsi playing tablas, shakers and the mazhar. "Innocent's Song" is the duo's "dark" arrangement of Johnny Coppin's musical version of Charles Causley's poem of the same name. "Union Street" was described as "striking" and "sparsely-textured", "telling poignantly of the last letters between a Marine and his wife". The song features the band's frequent collaborator Miranda Sykes singing the lines of the wife. Producer Simon Emmerson is credited for recording the sounds of the A35 road present in "The Bet". The quirky "Scratch" shows "a cynical look at curious addictions". The album's final song, "All I'd Ever Lost", is a "reflection set in the ambient hautings of an attic-room", ending the album on "a highly personal yet truly universal note.

== Release and promotion ==
The album was released on the band's own label Hands on Music on 15 May 2006. The CD version is packaged in a digipak. The duo released two double A-side singles from the album. "Witness" and "If I Needed Someone" were released together as the first single in 2006, and "Roots" was released in 2007 as a double A-side with "Country Life" from the band's previous album Country Life. A music video was filmed for "Roots" in 2006, showing the duo sing the song in several locations. The version of the song in the music video is slightly remixed. Parts of the music video were filmed at the 33rd Trowbridge Village Pump Festival in July 2006, where the duo played the song twice in a row as they did not have enough footage to use from the song's first performance. The music video also shows the band sing the song near the Eden Project in Cornwall. "Roots" became their best-selling single ever, and reached number 4 on the HMV Download Chart. The song also received widespread national airplay from the likes of Radio Caroline and BBC Radio 2 disc jockeys Bob Harris and Johnnie Walker.

The duo toured in promotion of the album from 2006–2007. Following the album tour, the duo undertook a smaller "Tour of Topsham" in March 2007, playing in pubs across Topsham, Devon, before playing their third performance at the Royal Albert Hall in April. A compilation live DVD of performances from the Tour of Topsham was released as Tour of Topsham March 2007 at the end of the year, coinciding with the release of their "best of" retrospective compilation album Roots: The Best of Show of Hands (2007), which features three songs from the album; "Roots", which is presented as the version from the music video, "The Falmouth Packet/Haul Away Joe" and "Innocents' Song / Gwithian". The first two songs appear on the first disc, Short Stories, whilst "Innocents' Song / Gwithian" appears on the second disc, Longdogs, whose track selection was picked after fans of the band were asked to choose their favourite songs from each of the duo's albums on polls created on the band's former internet forum Longdogs. Released exclusively to members of Londogs on 27 December 2008 was a limited edition live album entitled Live at Exeter Phoenix, featuring the duo's performance at Exeter Phoenix from the Witness tour.

== Critical reception ==
Professional ratings
Review scores
Source	Rating
The Living Tradition	favourable
Mojo	4/5 stars
NetRhythms	favourable
Spiral Earth	favourable

The album was released to a favourable reception from critics, praising the crossover sound of the album, the Celts' production and Knightley's lyrics. Gordon Potter of Living Tradition described the album as "another tour de force by Show of Hands, the irrepressible Steve Knightley and Phil Beer, here supported by an impressive selection of backing singers and musicians, who combine to produce an album which is darkly satisfying", and also noted "the whole production is a thoughtful and thought-provoking success," before concluding the album is a "first-class release". NetRhythms said the album is "recognisably classic (and classy) Show Of Hands and at the same time something very fresh and boldly different", noting the album "proves a particularly impressive entry in the Show Of Hands canon" and that the production "sets its own standards and provides an inventive and creative new setting for the Show Of Hands experience we know and love."

Iain Hazlewood of Spiral Earth said "everything has come together perfectly on this recording," noting the production resulted in a "confident enveloping sound", that "the alchemy between [the duo] is in their arrangements, lifting their music away from divides of genre", and that the "sense of place was as strong as ever". Mojo gave the album four out of five stars, and later ranked Witness at number 10 on their best folk albums of 2006 list. Colin Irwin of the publication said that "Steve Knightley's songs have developed such an edge that it's hard to deny them any longer".

It was reported than some fans were unwelcoming of the album's electronic beats, but nonetheless, many fans regarded it as a welcome change, and it became the band's biggest-selling album, overtaking Live at the Royal Albert Hall (1996). Beer said that "the simple point is at the end of the day this album is outselling any others we have made and it's got us a new audience and you could cynically say we've sacrificed some of our old audience to gain a new one." At the BBC Radio 2 Folk Awards 2007, the duo were nominated for "Best Duo", whilst "Roots" was nominated for "Best Original Song". The song also featured on the awards' corresponding compilation album. The duo were also nominated for "Best Duo" and "Best Live Act" in 2008. In November 2006, they were voted the "Greatest Devonians" in Devon County Council's competition, with more than a third of the votes. Other contenders included Sir Francis Drake, Charles Babbage, Agatha Christie and Muse. In February 2007, Knightley, who enjoyed recording Witness at Presshouse Studio, returned to the studio to record his second solo album Cruel River, released later that year.

== Track listing ==
All tracks written by Steve Knightley, except where noted.

1. "Witness" – 3:31
  - Steve Knightley: vocals, acoustic guitar, cuatro
  - Phil Beer: vocals, fiddle, viola, mandolin
  - Seth Lakeman: vocals, tenor guitar
  - Miranda Sykes: vocals, double bass
  - Matt Clifford: keyboards
  - Mass: percussion and drum programming
2. "Roots" – 4:48
  - Steve Knightley: vocals, acoustic guitar, mandocello, cuatro
  - Phil Beer: vocals, fiddle, viola, acoustic slide guitar
  - Fisherman's Friends: 'Haul away' choir
  - Mass: bass, percussion and drum programming
3. "The Dive" – 4:41
  - Steve Knightley: vocals, high strung and low tuned mandocellos
  - Phil Beer: acoustic guitar, fiddle
  - Matt Clifford: piano
  - Miranda Sykes: double bass
  - Paul Wilson: melodeon
  - Mass: Ambience and percussion programming
  - Lyme Bay: The Sea
4. "The Falmouth Packet" (Phil Beer) / "Haul Away Joe" (Trad arr. Knightley/Beer) – 5:36
  - Phil Beer: lead vocals, fiddle, mandolin
  - Steve Knightley: vocals, cuatro
  - Seth Lakeman: tenor guitar
  - Miranda Sykes: double bass
  - Paul Wilson: melodeon
  - Jackie Oates: fiddle
  - Lizzie Westcott: fiddle
  - Mass: percussion and drum programming
5. "Undertow" – 5:18
  - Steve Knightley: vocals, high and low tuned mandocellos, acoustic guitar
  - Phil Beer: EBow, acoustic guitar
  - Miranda Sykes: double bass
  - Matt Clifford: piano
  - Mass: shaker
6. "If I Needed Someone" (George Harrison) – 3:33
  - Steve Knightley: vocals, mandocello, acoustic guitar
  - Phil Beer: vocals, fiddle, melodeon
  - Miranda Sykes: vocals, double bass, cello
  - Johnny Kalsi: tablas, mazhar, shakers
  - Mass: Percussion and drum programming
7. "Innocents’ Song" (poem by Charles Causley, music by Johnny Coppin) / "Gwithian" (Beer) – 4:38
  - Phil Beer: lead vocals, fiddle
  - Steve Knightley: vocals
  - Miranda Sykes: vocals, double bass
8. "Union Street (Last Post)" (Knightley/Matt Clifford) – 4:14
  - Steve Knightley: vocals
  - Miranda Sykes: vocals
  - Matt Clifford: piano
  - Paul Downes: guitar
9. "The Bet" – 4:20
  - Steve Knightley: vocals, acoustic guitar, acoustic bass guitar
  - Phil Beer: cuatro, slide guitar
  - Matt Clifford: keyboards
  - Simon Emmerson: The A35!
10. "Ink Devil" – 5:01
  - Steve Knightley: vocals, acoustic guitar, cuatro
  - Phil Beer: fiddle, mandolin
  - Miranda Sykes: double bass
  - Paul Wilson: melodeon
  - Mass: percussion and drum programming
11. "Scratch" – 3:39
  - Steve Knightley: vocals, acoustic guitar, cuatro
  - Phil Beer: fiddle, mandolin, Dobro
  - Miranda Sykes: double bass
  - Matt Clifford: keyboards
  - Mass: Percussion and drum programming
12. "All I'd Ever Lost" – 5:37
  - Steve Knightley: vocals, low tuned mandocellos
  - Miranda Sykes: double bass, cello
  - Matt Clifford: piano
  - Mass: atmospherics, keyboards and drum programming

== Charts ==
=== Singles ===
Single	Chart (2006)	Peak position
"Roots"	HMV Download Chart	4
