= Sue Dougan =

Northern Irish afternoon presenter

Susan Dougan (born 29 October 1974, in London) is a Northern Irish afternoon presenter on Radio Cambridgeshire on weekday afternoons.

== Personal life ==
Her father was from Northern Ireland and her mother was from Scotland. She grew up in West Belfast during the Troubles in a Catholic household from May 1981. In Belfast she joined the Belfast Community Circus and trained with the Ulster Youth Theatre. In her early teens she had a crush on Phillip Schofield, which awakened her interest in entering the world of media. She studied at the University of Manchester.

She lived in Kent from 2000-5 in Sevenoaks and then Lenham. She met her husband in 2002 on a Sunday morning at Leeds Castle (where he was the special events manager) whilst presenting an outside broadcast. They married in 2005 in Lincoln Cathedral. She enjoys gardening and looking after her three cats in Hertfordshire. In 2011 she had her first child, a boy, and has since taken time out.

== Broadcasting career ==
She presented an hour and half programme on the Radio Royal radio station at the Royal Victoria Hospital in Belfast at the age of 15. At 16, she worked as a presenter on Radio Top Shop in Belfast. At university she worked at Cool FM in Newtownards. After university, she worked at the commercial radio station Rock FM in Preston, Lancashire, then other commercial stations including Radio Mercury and Southern FM.

=== BBC ===
She worked at BBC local radio stations in Lancashire, Northampton (joining in 2000 when living in Sevenoaks) and Sussex. From 2001, she began presenting a three-hour Sunday gardening show. From 2002 to 2005, she was the main evening presenter for BBC local radio in the BBC South area, based at Radio Kent. She joined Radio Cambridgeshire on 9 May 2005 for a three-hour programme from 1 pm. Until 2006, she also drove to Kent every Sunday to present a gardening programme. From 8 April 2007, she presented a two-hour gardening phone-in programme on Sunday mornings from 10 am, which finished on 20 December 2009, when Catherine Carr took over. In early 2008 her weekday programme moved to 12.30 – 4 pm, and on 15 November 2010 it moved to noon to 3 pm. This slot is now filled by Jeremy Sallis. Sue does appear on air as a stand in presenter and continues to work at BBC Radio Cambridgeshire.
