= The Long Way Home (Show of Hands album) =

Studio album by Show of Hands
- Released: 15 January 2016
- Recorded: 2015
- Genre: Folk
- Label: Hands on Music

Show of Hands chronology
Centenary: Words & Music of the Great War (2014)	The Long Way Home (2016)	Battlefield Dance Floor (2019)

The Long Way Home is the seventeenth studio album by the folk duo Show of Hands. It was released on 15 January 2016, although copies were available at dates on the autumn tour in 2015.

It reached number 70 on the UK Albums Chart, and number 9 in the UK Independent Albums Chart.

== Reception ==
Professional ratings
Review scores
Source	Rating
Acoustic Magazine	(favourable)
Bright Young Folk	(favourable)
The Daily Telegraph	4/5 stars
Fatea Records	(favourable)
Folk Radio	(favourable)
Folk Worlds	(favourable)
fRoots	(favourable)
The Guardian	4/5 stars
Louder Than War	(8/10)
Songwriting Magazine	4/5 stars

Acoustic Magazine said the album showed the duo "continuing to build an astonishing legacy" and "returning to their roots". They concluded that it "skillfully weaves all the coherent folk themes together to a coherent whole".

The Daily Telegraph ranked the album at number 8 in their list of "The Best Folk Albums of 2016."

== Track listing ==
Taken from album notes:

1. Breme Fell At Hastings (Steve Knightley)
2. Hallows Eve (Chris Hoban)
3. Hambledon Fair (Trad Arr. Knightley) Tune - Portsdown Hill (Knightley)
4. The Long Way Home (Knightley)
5. Keep Hauling (Andrew Cadie)
6. 'Twas On One April's Morning (Trad Arr. Knightley/Phil Beer) Tune - Isca Rose (Knightley)
7. Sweet Bella (Knightley)
8. The Old Lych Way (Chris Hoban)
9. Walk With me (When The Sun Goes Down) (Knightley)
10. Virginia (Trad Arr. Knightley/Beer)
11. John Harrisons' Hands (Dick Gaughan/Brian McNeil)
12. Mesopotamia (Knightley)

== Charts ==
Chart (2016)	Peak position
UK Albums (OCC)	70
UK Independent Albums Chart	9
