= Cruel River =

Studio album by Steve Knightley
- Released: 4 June 2007
- Recorded: February 2007
- Studio: Presshouse Studios, Colyton
- Genre: Folk; English folk
- Label: Hands on Music
- Producer: Steve Knightley and Mark Tucker

Steve Knightley chronology
Track of Words (1999)	Cruel River (2007)	Track of Words − Retraced (2009)

Singles from Cruel River
- 1. "Poppy Day" Released: November 2006

Cruel River is the second solo studio album by English folk singer-songwriter Steve Knightley. Knightley had spent 2006 with Show of Hands, his duo with Phil Beer, recording, releasing and promoting their twelfth album together, Witness, which saw the duo explore a worldbeat sound that departed from their usual English folk sound. The album was a success with critics and most fans, although some were perplexed by its direction. During a break in promoting that album with touring in early 2007, Knightley decided to record his first solo album since 1999. Hiring regular Show of Hands collaborator Mark Tucker to co-produce the album with himself, Knightley recorded the album in Presshouse Studios, Colyton in February 2007. The album explores a stripped-back, minimal English folk sound, similar to that of early Show of Hands. Lyrically, the album tackles dark subject matter.

Released on 4 June 2007 by Show of Hands' own label Hands on Music, the album was a critical success, with one review declaring it "another reminder of his song-writing skills and his fine, distinctive vocals." Knightley would soon return to Show of Hands but ultimately recorded another solo album, Track of Words – Retraced, in 2009. The Show of Hands website considers Cruel River to be "understated yet powerful".

== Background and recording ==
Steve Knightley, best known as one half of the folk duo Show of Hands, had spent the 1990s releasing albums with the duo, but when the duo took a brief break in 1999, he released his first solo album, Track of Words, which featured what the Show of Hands website would later describe as a "more mainstream-sounding" sound than his usual style, or indeed the style of Show of Hands. Knightley spent the majority of his musical career in the 2000s touring and releasing music with Show of Hands, occasionally releasing solo collaboration albums along the way, namely Faith, Folk and Anarchy (2002) with Martyn Joseph and Tom Robinson, Western Approaches (2004) with Seth Lakeman and Jenna Witts, and Bridgerow Sessions with Martyn Joseph (2005). In 2006, Show of Hands released their twelfth studio album Witness. The album was produced by Simon Emmerson and Massey of Afro Celt Sound System and featured a crossover African and electronica-influenced sound with the band's typical English folk style. The album marked the first time since Beat about the Bush (1994) that the duo had undertaken experiments with a rhythm section. Many fans and critics welcomed it and it became the band's best-selling album, although a minority of fans did not welcome the album's new direction.

After the duo had promoted the album between throughout 2006, the album would have more sporadic promotion in 2007, including the "Tour of Topsham" pubs in March 2007. Prior to the tour, in February 2007, the duo took a short break. Having not released a solo album for many years, Knightley took the time to release a solo album. Unlike Show of Hands' more recent musical direction, his solo album would be much more simpler in sound, in a similar style to the duo's older sound. The album was recorded in February 2007 and co-produced by Knightley and Show of Hands' regular collaborator Mark Tucker. The album was recorded at the Presshouse Studio in Colyton, also the studio where Witness was recorded.

== Music and lyrics ==
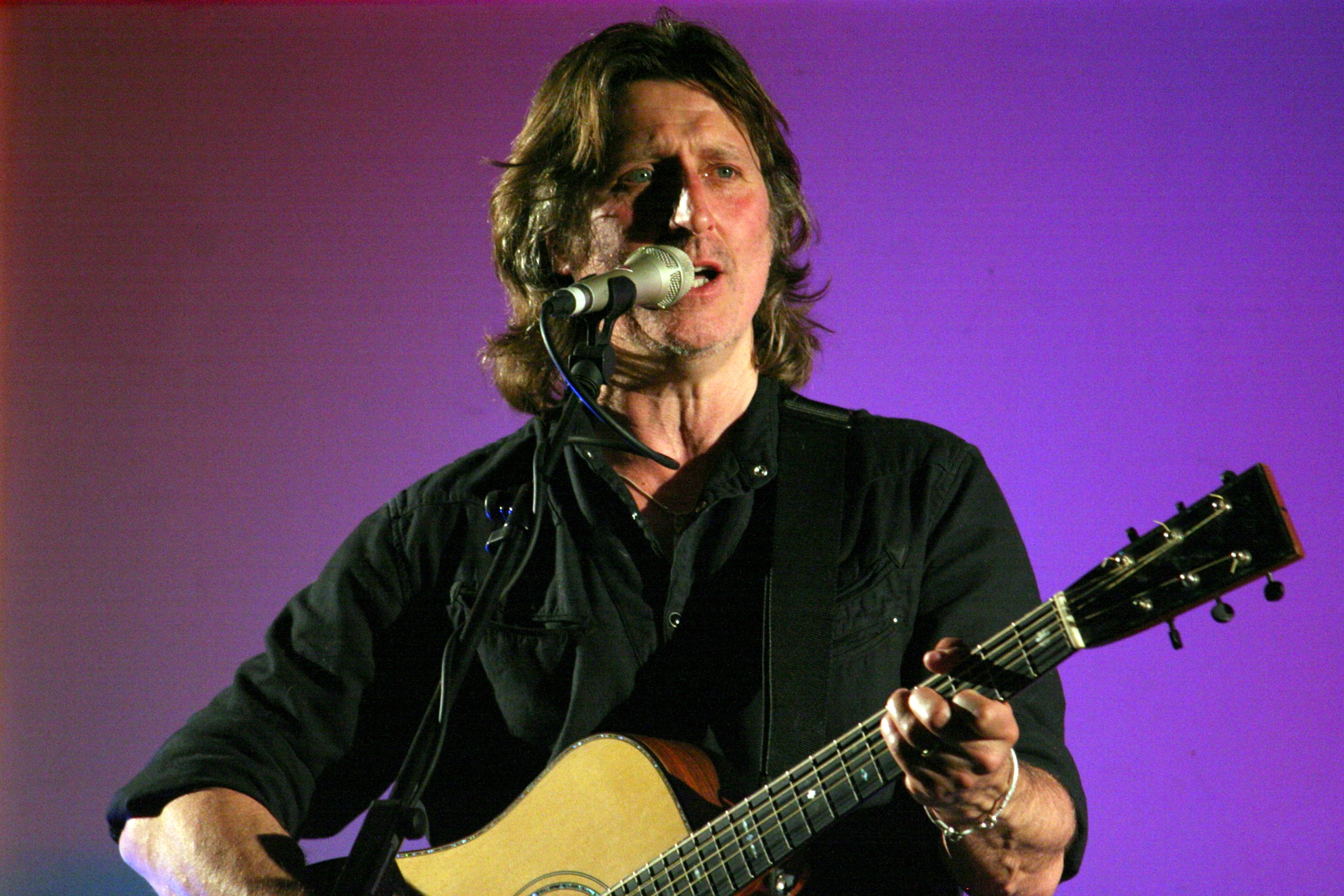
Steve Knightley (pictured in 2009) was in a "particularly creative and productive phase" as he recorded the album.

Released only a year after Show of Hands' Witness, Iain Hazlewood of Cruel River said that the album was recorded as Knightley was in a "particularly creative and productive phase." The album showcases Knightley's vocal strength against stripped back instrumentation, with Grem Devlin of Living Tradition said that most of the tracks contain "the simplest of acoustic accompaniments to his dulcet tones." Lyrically, the album covers the range of human experience and emotion. Hazlewod said that, on the album, Knightley "conjures engaging characters and more often than not let's [sic] them play out their dramas in the Devon landscape. I don't know of any other songwriter that can move from first to third person narratives with such ease, or of one that can bring the natural and cultural landscape to life in such a way." Robin Denselow of The Guardian stated that Knightley dares "to tackle subjects that other songwriters leave well alone." Grem Devlin of Living Tradition said that, with Knightley never being one "to skirt difficult issues," the songs on the album cover "multiple child drownings in the River Dart, the heroin trade, village miscreants, the Iraq War, cattle rustling, faux existentialism," but noted that "despite all the potential for depression in the subject matter, the delivery is uplifting and soothing, especially on the covers." Hazlewod noted that "the new songs explore familiar territory, with his customary insight and social commentary."

=== Composition ===
"When I was a boy living in the middle of Exeter, our local bobby, Geoff Barnsey, became a close friend of the family. His mother ran the village Post Office in Poundsgate, on Dartmoor and we spent many a hot summer's afternoon swimming in the icy waters of the Dart. Geoff's mum was the first to tell me of the local saying "River Dart, river of Dart, every year you claim a heart"—a saying that even today still contains a tragic grain of truth."

—Steve Knightley, talking about the title track

The opening song, "Raining Again", was inspired by when Knightley moved back to Devon from London in 1986 but soon felt the implications of "living eight-hundred feet up the side of a north facing hill". "Poppy Day", released as a single on Poppy Day in 2006, was described by Denselow as a "cleverly written story of a drug dealer working the rural market ("I make my killing down the M4 corridor"), mixed in with a sub-plot about his best mate, fighting through the opium fields in Afghanistan." Hazlewod said the song "chronicles the by-product of the symbol of remembrance—opium that ends up as heroin on our streets." "All Quiet on the Western Front" was written when Knightley "came up with this little guitar passage" on his newly David Oddy-restored, vintage Harmony Sovereign. The fourth song, "Tall Ship Story", seen as epitomising this minimalist ethic of the music, is a tale of the seas sung against a single mandocello and "a bit of fuzz guitar". Knightley said that the piano in "She's Me" "seems to bring out the romantic in [him]" and noted he was "pleased to be able to add this to [their] joint collection." Dave Wood adds his "unique touch" on slide guitar to the track. The title track is about the true, historic tales of children drowning in Knightley's local River Dart. It was re-recorded for Show of Hands' sixteenth studio album Wake the Union (2012).

Knightley noted that he "had to check" with his "learned pal", Simon Emmerson, whether the seventh track, "The Rock", "actually constituted an 'existential' love song or not." He further commented: "It would seem that the moment life-changing advice is offered to another person, it isn't. David, a long time SOH supporter, confirmed this fact after a show up north. History I can do, philosophy I struggle with." "Tout Va Bien?" is a song of "multiple questions". Knightley said" look, it seemed like a good idea at the time. Take a SoH standard, record it in waltz time and sing it in French! If this turns out to be the song that buys the yacht, then the ironies of the music business will finally defeat me. Thanks to Mr. Clifford for the translation and vocal coaching and apologies to any French listeners for the inevitable errors." "Transported" is another tale of West Country rural villainy, whilst his cover of Gary Fjellgaard’s "Caragena Wind" is the first of two cover versions on the album. The official last song, "Crooked Man '07", described as an "old favourite", was previously recorded several times by Show of Hands as "Crooked Man", including on their live album As You Were (2005). Originally written in 2004, Knightley felt that his original version lacked focus and did not really express his rage "at the deceit that led us into the tragedy of this seemingly never-ending foreign campaign," hence his motive to re-record it. A live version of Dire Straits' "Romeo and Juliet" closes the album as a bonus track. One reviewer described he made the latter cover "his own" to the reviewer's "considerable relief".

== Release and reception ==
Professional ratings
Review scores
Source	Rating
The Guardian	3/5 stars
The Living Tradition	(favourable)
Spiral Earth	(favourable)

The album was released on 4 June 2007 on Show of Hands' own record label Hands on Music as the twenty-sixth release on the label. Knightley would return to Show of Hands later in the year, but when the duo took another break in 2009, Knightley recorded another solo album, Track of Words – Retraced, a stripped-back re-recording of his first solo album, Track of Words (1999). The title track of Cruel River was re-recorded by Show of Hands for their sixteenth studio album, Wake the Union (2012).

The album was released to a positive critical reception. Grem Devlin of Living Tradition wrote a positive review, saying that "this collection of songs is a well-balanced showcase of Knightley’s writing talents, with mostly the simplest of acoustic accompaniments to his dulcet tones." He noted that "the total effect is tight and well balanced, as expected from this artiste, and, minor quibbles apart, deserves to further elevate the windswept and interesting one." Ian Hazlewood of Spiral Earth said that "this album covers the range of human experience and emotion, indeed, I'd say that Steve Knightley would find it physically impossible to release an album that was not well-rounded. Likewise the production is understated yet excellent, play it on a high end hi-fi and the relationship between singer, music and listener is delightfully intimate." Robin Denselow of The Guardian rated the album three stars out of five and said that the album was "another reminder of his song-writing skills and his fine, distinctive vocals." He said that Knightley was "not quite in the Richard Thompson league, but he does dare to tackle subjects that other songwriters leave well alone. His speciality is the reality of contemporary English country life, and his best songs are bleak, witty and finely observed," and said that "Poppy Day" was "by far the most original and impressive song here." The Show of Hands website described the album as "understated yet powerful".

== Track listing ==
All tracks written by Steve Knightley, except where noted.

1. "Raining Again"
2. "Poppy Day"
3. "All Quiet on the Western Front"
4. "Tall Ship Story"
5. "She's Gone"
6. "Cruel River"
7. "The Rocks"
8. "Tout Va Bien"
9. "Transported"
10. "Caragana Wind" (Gary Fjellgaard)
11. "Crooked Man '07"
12. "Romeo and Juliet" (live) (Mark Knopfler)
