= John Spencer-Barnes =

- Born: 26 May 1961 (age 65); Dudley, United Kingdom
- Occupations: Radio broadcaster, journalist

John Spencer-Barnes is a radio broadcaster and journalist for the BBC.

He was born in Dudley, England in 1961 and educated at Wolverhampton University.

He began his career as a freelance broadcaster at BRMB in Birmingham and then moved to the experimental BBC service WM Heartlands in East Birmingham between 1989 and 1991.

He was involved in the campaign for community radio and was News Editor of the UK's first community radio station, Wear FM in Sunderland. He later broadcast with the Chiltern Radio Network at Northants 96, Chiltern FM and Severn Sound.

He was the launch manager of Welsh commercial station Radio Maldwyn and 107.9 Huddersfield FM in West Yorkshire. He also spent a period as manager of the commercial radio station at Freetown in Sierra Leone.

In 1994 he became News Editor of 97.4 Rock FM and Red Rose 999 in Preston, Lancashire. While at Rock FM, he co-ordinated the EMAP Radio response to the IRA bombing of Manchester. The bomb had taken Manchester's Key 103 and Piccadilly Magic 1152 off air. He arranged an emergency news service for the Manchester stations and a replacement radio service from a studio in Preston.

His more recent career has been at the BBC where he has broadcast at BBC Hereford and Worcester, BBC Radio Berkshire and was the presenter of the Late Show on BBC Radio Lancashire, which was simulcast to BBC Radio Manchester, for more than a decade. He is now the BBC reporter for Lancaster, Lancashire and Morecambe Bay.

He is a Director of the Maritime Volunteer Service and the Director of Communications for the organisation. He is a Trustee of the search and rescue charity Bay Search & Rescue which operates on the sands of Morecambe Bay and elsewhere in the country. He is also the town crier of St Anne's on the Sea.

In February 2021, it was reported that Spencer-Barnes was moving to a freelance status and would also present a regular slot on the Lancashire station Rossendale Radio.
