= Colin Irwin (journalist) =

British music journalist (1951–2022)

- Born: Colin Lester Irwin; 19 May 1951; Chertsey, Surrey, England
- Died: 3 November 2022 (aged 71)
- Occupations: Music journalist; radio presenter; playwright
- Years active: 1973–2022

Colin Lester Irwin (19 May 1951 – 3 November 2022) was a British music journalist.

== Biography ==
He was born in Chertsey, Surrey, England, and attended Strode's Grammar School in Egham. He studied journalism at Guildford College before working at the Slough Evening Mail, and becoming a patron of folk clubs from the late 1960s. He started writing on a freelance basis for music magazines before joining Melody Maker in 1974, writing mainly about British folk music and interviewing many of the notable performers of the period. He later became features editor and then assistant editor at Melody Maker, leaving in summer 1987 as the magazine moved in a different direction. He became editor of the pop music magazine Number One in the late 1980s and early 1990s. Later, he worked on a freelance basis for magazines including Q and Mojo, as well as magazines covering sport and travel.

He reviewed music for The Guardian, Mojo, The Daily Telegraph, The Independent, fRoots, Planet Sound and Spiral Earth, and was a Mercury Music Prize judge. He also wrote books, starting with biographies of Dire Straits (1994) and Abba (with Tony Calder and Andrew Loog Oldham, 1996). His 2003 book In Search of the Craic details a comic journey around Ireland seeking out pub music sessions, and became a best-seller in Ireland. Subsequent books were In Search of Albion (2005), a similarly light-hearted journey around English traditions and rituals, and Sing When You're Winning (2006), about the history and culture of terrace songs at football matches. His other books included biographies of Neil Young, Leonard Cohen, and Bob Dylan.

Irwin presented music programmes on BBC Radio 2. His play The Corridor has been performed in Surrey and Yorkshire. Other plays he wrote which have been performed on stage in different parts of the country include One of Us Is Lying, When Barry Met Cally and I Am the Way. In 2017, his theatrical music show, She Moved Through the Fair: The Legend of Margaret Barry, co-written with Irish singer Mary McPartlan, debuted at Glasgow's Tron Theatre as part of the Celtic Connections festival.

Irwin died from a suspected heart attack on 3 November 2022, at the age of 71.

== Publications ==
- Dire Straits (Orion Books, 1994)
- Abba: The Name of the Game (with Andrew Oldham and Tony Calder) (Pan, 1996)
- The Rough Guide to World Music (contributor)
- In Search of the Craic: One Man's Pub Crawl Through Irish Music (2004)
- In Search of Albion: From Cornwall to Cumbria – A Ride Through England's Hidden Soul (2005)
- Sing When You're Winning: Search for the Soul of Football (2006)
- Legendary Sessions: Bob Dylan: Highway 61 Revisited (2007)
- Neil Young: A Life in Pictures (2012)
- Leonard Cohen: Still the Man (2015)

== Albums compiled by Irwin ==
- The Very Best of Celtic (Various artists) (2004)
