= Spiral Earth =

- Website type: Music, news and media
- Available in: English
- Creator: Iain Hazlewood
- Editor: Iain Hazlewood
- Website: www.spiralearth.co.uk

Spiral Earth is an online news channel and website, based in Cambridgeshire, England. It covers folk music, roots music and the alternative music scene in the United Kingdom. It is edited by Iain Hazlewood, who founded Spiral Earth in 2004.

Spiral Earth's website includes reviews of CD releases and music festivals and features about music. Its feature writers have included Colin Irwin, former assistant editor of Melody Maker magazine and former editor of Number One magazine, writer and folk musician Andy Letcher, Kirsty Ambler, and Dave Kushar.

It publishes an online guide to UK and European folk, roots, and alternative festivals. This was formerly in association with fRoots magazine.

== Spiral Awards ==
The Spiral Awards took place every year from 2011 to 2015, when Spiral Earth invited the public to vote for the best album (in various categories), and for the best male singer, female singer, duo, group, original song, songwriter, live act, and festival. In 2015, over 34,000 votes were cast.
