= 1994 in music =

This is a list of notable events in music that took place in the year 1994.

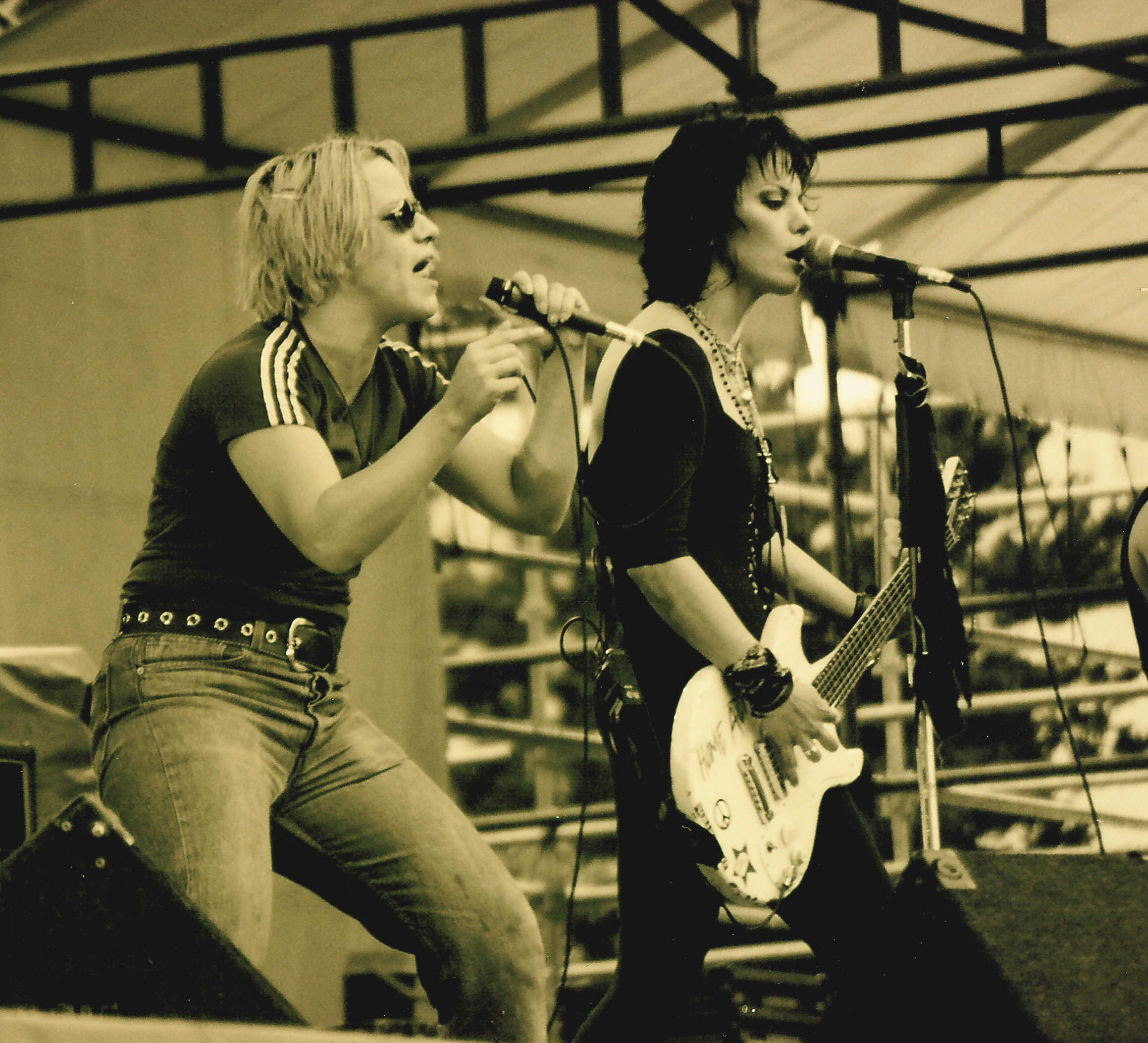
Joan Jett performing at Bumbershoot 1994.

== Specific locations ==
- 1994 in British music
- 1994 in Norwegian music
- 1994 in Scandinavian music
- 1994 in South Korean music

== Specific genres ==
- 1994 in country music
- 1994 in heavy metal music
- 1994 in hip-hop
- 1994 in jazz
- 1994 in Latin music
- 1994 in progressive rock

== Events ==
=== January–February ===
- January 19 – Bryan Adams becomes the first major Western music star to perform in Vietnam since the end of the Vietnam War.
- January 21–February 5 – The Big Day Out festival takes place, again expanding from the previous year's venues to include the Gold Coast, Queensland and Auckland, New Zealand. The festival is headlined by Soundgarden, Ramones and Björk.
- January 25 – Alice in Chains release Jar of Flies which makes its debut at No. 1 on the Billboard 200, becoming the first EP to do so.
- January 29 – The Supremes' Mary Wilson is injured when her Jeep hits a freeway median and flips over just outside Los Angeles. Her 14-year-old son was killed in the accident.
- February 1 – Green Day release their breakthrough album Dookie, ushering in the mid-1990s punk revival. It later achieves diamond certification.
- February 7 – Blind Melon's lead singer Shannon Hoon is forced to leave the American Music Awards ceremony for disruptive behavior. He was later charged with battery, assault, resisting arrest, and destroying a police station phone.
- February 11 – The three surviving members of The Beatles reunite to begin recording additional music for unfinished John Lennon's demos, presented to Paul McCartney by Yoko Ono with Jeff Lynne producing. The track, "Free As A Bird", is released as a single in late 1995 as part of the exhaustive Beatles Anthology project, reaching No. 2 on the UK Singles Chart and No. 6 on the Billboard Hot 100.
- February 14 – Grateful Dead guitarist and frontman Jerry Garcia marries Deborah Koons.
- February 23 – Eddie Van Halen, Chris Isaak, and B.B. King attend the groundbreaking ceremony for the Hard Rock Hotel and Casino in Paradise, Nevada.
- February 26 – The Sanremo Music Festival ends with Aleandro Baldi winning the "Big Artists" category for the song "Passerà".

=== March–April ===
- March 1
  - Selena becomes the first Tejano music singer to win a Grammy Award.
  - Nirvana play their final concert, in Munich.
  - The 36th Annual Grammy Awards are presented in New York, hosted by Garry Shandling. The soundtrack from the 1992 film The Bodyguard wins Album of the Year, while its lead single, Whitney Houston's cover of "I Will Always Love You", wins Record of the Year. The single version of "A Whole New World", performed by Peabo Bryson and Regina Belle, wins Song of the Year. Toni Braxton wins Best New Artist.
  - Frank Sinatra receives the Grammy Legend Award. Sinatra's acceptance speech is cut short. Other artists criticize the producer's decision during the show, and Billy Joel takes extra time to perform his song, "The River of Dreams", noting that he is wasting valuable air time.
- March 3 – In Rome, Nirvana's Kurt Cobain lapses into a coma after overdosing on Rohypnol and champagne.
- March 5 – Grace Slick is arrested for pointing a shotgun at police in her Tiburon, California, home.
- March 7 – The United States Supreme Court decision Campbell v. Acuff-Rose Music, Inc. rules that parody can qualify as fair use. The case was spurred by 2 Live Crew releasing a parody of the Roy Orbison hit "Oh, Pretty Woman" without a license from the publishing firm Acuff-Rose Music.
- March 8 – Nine Inch Nails release their second studio album The Downward Spiral. It would go on to sell over 3 million copies and be credited with helping bring industrial rock music into the mainstream.
- March 13 – Selena releases her final Spanish album Amor Prohibido. Its production had been delayed because of the launch of Selena's fashion clothing line and boutiques, and her "Selena Live!" tour in support of Live!.
- March 18
  - Courtney Love calls the police, fearing that her husband, Nirvana's Kurt Cobain, is suicidal. Police confiscate four guns and 25 boxes of ammunition from Cobain's home.
  - Bassist Darryl Jones replaces Bill Wyman in The Rolling Stones.
- March 30 – Pink Floyd embark on what would be their last world tour before their breakup. The record-breaking tour supports their Division Bell album, with the band playing to 5,500,000 people in 68 cities and grossing over £150,000,000 (US$186,952,500).
- March 31 – Madonna on Late Show with David Letterman: Madonna appears on the Late Show with David Letterman, making headlines with her profanity-laced interview. Robin Williams later describes the segment as a "battle of wits with an unarmed woman."
- April 8 – The body of Kurt Cobain, lead singer of Nirvana, is found. Cobain's death, three days before, is legally declared to be suicide from a self-inflicted gunshot.
  - The Offspring release Smash, which goes on to become the best selling independent album of all time and one of the most influential albums of the 90s.
- April 25
  - Blur releases Parklife, their first album to reach No. 1 in UK, where it was certified quadruple platinum.
  - Adam Horovitz of the Beastie Boys is sentenced to 200 hours of community service for attacking a television cameraman during funeral services for actor River Phoenix in November 1993.
- April 26 – Grace Slick pleads guilty to having pointed a shotgun at police officers on March 5.
- April 27 – The legendary Fillmore club reopens in San Francisco with a concert headlined by The Smashing Pumpkins.
- April 30 – The 39th Eurovision Song Contest takes place in Dublin, Ireland, which becomes the first-ever country to win three consecutive contests. Its winners are Paul Harrington and Charlie McGettigan with "Rock 'N' Roll Kids", written by Brendan Graham. The interval features the first-ever public performance of Riverdance, featuring Michael Flatley and Jean Butler, which developed into the world-famous stage show.

=== May–June ===
- May 2 – A Los Angeles jury finds Michael Bolton, along with co-writer Andy Goldmark and Sony Music Entertainment, guilty of copyright infringement over the song "Love Is a Wonderful Thing". The song is ruled to be too similar to a song of the same name by The Isley Brothers.
- May 3 – The Rolling Stones arrive by yacht to a press conference in New York City to announce the Voodoo Lounge Tour kicking off in the summer.
- May 6
  - Pearl Jam files a complaint against Ticketmaster with the U.S. Justice Department charging that the company has a monopoly on the concert ticket business.
  - To help promote his new album, Alice Cooper releases a three-part comic book that followed the album The Last Temptation.
- May 9–13 – 1994 International Rostrum of Composers
- May 10
  - Tupac Shakur begins serving a 15-day sentence in a county jail for attacking director Allen Hughes on the set of a video shoot.
  - Weezer are introduced to the world with their self-titled debut, often referred to as the Blue Album. It would go on to become one of the most influential records of the 1990s spawning hits "Undone – The Sweater Song", "Buddy Holly" and "Say It Ain't So".
- May 26 – Michael Jackson and Lisa Marie Presley are married in the Dominican Republic.
- May 27 – The Eagles launch the Hell Freezes Over tour in Burbank, California. The reunion tour is the group's first since breaking up in 1980, but much is also made of the band becoming the first to charge over $100 per ticket for arena shows.
- June 7 – Grace Slick is sentenced to 200 hours of community service and three months' worth of Alcoholics Anonymous meetings after a March 5 incident with police officers.
- June 9 – Lisa "Left Eye" Lopes of TLC, in a domestic dispute with partner Andre Rison, sets fire to his shoes; the fire ultimately spreads to the mansion they share and destroys it; she is subsequently charged with arson.
- June 21 – George Michael loses his legal bid in a London court to be released from his contract with Sony Records.
- June 27 – Aerosmith becomes the first major band to premiere a new song on the Internet. Over 10,000 CompuServe subscribers download the free track "Head First" within its first eight days of availability.

=== July–August ===
- July 12–16 – The Yoyo A Go Go punk and indie rock festival opens in Olympia, Washington.
- July 30
  - The Verbier Festival is launched by Martin Engstrom.
  - In keeping with the country's new constitution and the promotion of its native language, Moldova adopts Limba noastră as its new national anthem, replacing the anthem of Romania which was previously in use.
  - Suede announce that guitarist Bernard Butler has left the band following fractious recording sessions for their album Dog Man Star.
- August 9
  - Peter Maxwell Davies conducts the first performance of his fifth symphony at the Royal Albert Hall in London, as part of The Proms.
  - Rich Mullins and "Leave a Legacy" contest winner, 76-year-old Miguel Garcia Massiate, travel to Bogotá, Colombia, with Compassion International. The two men visit the Ciudad Sucre Center where Mullins presented them with over $40,000 that was raised on his summer '94 Ragamuffin Band tour.
  - Decca releases a recording of the 1949 première of Benjamin Britten's Spring Symphony for the first time.
  - Machine Head release their first album Burn My Eyes, which was a big success and becomes Roadrunner Records' best selling debut album.
- August 11 – A compact disc copy of Sting's album Ten Summoner's Tales, released the previous year, becomes the first item securely purchased over the internet; the CD is sold for $12.48 plus shipping and handling fees.
- August 12–14 – Woodstock '94 is held in Saugerties, New York. As with the original 1969 festival, attendance is swelled by a high number of gatecrashers, while heavy rains turn the festival grounds into a sea of mud. Nine Inch Nails, Metallica, Aerosmith, Bob Dylan, Crosby, Stills & Nash, Red Hot Chili Peppers, Peter Gabriel, and Green Day are among the many performers.
- August 23 – Jeff Buckley releases his single, critically acclaimed, full-length studio album Grace.
- August 30
  - Oasis release their debut album Definitely Maybe; it becomes the fastest-selling debut album in British music history at the time.
  - Luis Miguel release Segundo Romance, the best-selling Latin album of the 1990s by a male artist. Four singles from the album were released; two of which reached No. 1 on the Top Latin Songs. It received a Grammy Award and a Billboard Latin Music Award.

=== September–October ===
- September 6
  - José Cura wins the Operalia – International Plácido Domingo Opera Singer Competition.
  - Bad Religion release their eighth studio album (and proper major-label debut) Stranger than Fiction. This proved to be the last to feature founding guitarist/songwriter Brett Gurewitz for seven years, until his return. Gurewitz would be replaced by former Minor Threat / Dag Nasty / Junkyard guitarist Brian Baker, who turned down a touring job for R.E.M. at this time, and eventually becomes a permanent member of Bad Religion.
- September 8 – Richard A. Morse, lead male vocalist of RAM, narrowly escapes a kidnapping by armed men during the band's live performance at the Hotel Oloffson in Port-au-Prince, Haiti; the attempted kidnapping was provoked by the performance of "Fèy", a RAM single banned nationwide by the military authorities.
- September 15 – A 1957 audio tape of John Lennon performing with The Quarrymen on the same night he met Paul McCartney fetches £78,500 at Sotheby's, London.
- October 12 – Jimmy Page and Robert Plant: No Quarter (Unledded) premieres on MTV. The "unplugged" concert special featuring the two former Led Zeppelin bandmates was filmed to accompany the release of the album of the same name.
- October 15 – The 23rd OTI Festival, held at the Teatro Principal in Valencia, Spain, is won by the song "Canción despareja", written by Bibi Albert, and performed by Claudia Carenzio representing Argentina.

=== November–December ===
- November 20 – David Crosby undergoes a seven-hour liver transplant operation in Los Angeles.
- November 30 – The Breeders guitarist Kelley Deal is arrested at her Ohio home after accepting a private-courier package containing four grams of heroin.
- December 2 – Warner Music Group acquires a 49 percent share of Seattle record label Sub Pop in a deal believed to be worth over $30 million.
- December 18 – Paul Oakenfold's legendary Goa Mix is first broadcast in the early hours of this day as a BBC Radio 1 Essential Mix.
- December 19 – Aerosmith opens the 250-seat Mama Kin Music Hall in Boston, co-owned by the group, with a performance.
- December 31 – The twenty-third annual New Year's Rockin' Eve special airs on ABC, with appearances by Melissa Etheridge, The O'Jays, Salt-N-Pepa, Hootie & the Blowfish and Jon Secada.

=== Also in 1994 ===
- Summer – Tony Wilson attempts to revive Factory Records, in collaboration with London Records, as "Factory Too".

== Bands formed ==
- See Musical groups established in 1994

== Bands disbanded ==
- See Musical groups disestablished in 1994

== Bands reformed ==
- See Musical groups reestablished in 1994

== Albums released ==
=== January–March ===
Date		Album	Artist	Notes
J A N U A R Y	4	Music from the Motion Picture Philadelphia	Various Artists	Soundtrack
J A N U A R Y	4	Trashed	Lagwagon	-
J A N U A R Y	10	Get What You Deserve	Sodom	-
J A N U A R Y	11	She'd Give Anything	Boy Howdy	EP
J A N U A R Y	13	Mary Queen of Scots	Eugenius	-
J A N U A R Y	18	Antenna	ZZ Top	-
J A N U A R Y	18	A Constipated Monkey	Kurious	-
J A N U A R Y	18	Dogman	King's X	-
J A N U A R Y	18	Here It Is	Freddie Jackson	-
J A N U A R Y	18	LL77	Lisa Lisa	-
J A N U A R Y	18	Mirror Blue	Richard Thompson	-
J A N U A R Y	18	Total Destruction	Unsane	-
J A N U A R Y	18	Whiskey for the Holy Ghost	Mark Lanegan	-
J A N U A R Y	24	Dubnobasswithmyheadman	Underworld	-
J A N U A R Y	25	Jar of Flies	Alice in Chains	EP
J A N U A R Y	25	Blunted on Reality	Fugees	Debut
J A N U A R Y	25	Best of Bachman–Turner Overdrive Live	Bachman–Turner Overdrive	Live
J A N U A R Y	25	Cleansing	Prong	-
J A N U A R Y	25	Face the Music	NKOTB	-
J A N U A R Y	25	Hips and Makers	Kristin Hersh	-
J A N U A R Y	25	Kickin' It Up	John Michael Montgomery	-
J A N U A R Y	25	Life Lover	Aaron Kwok	Chinese Compilation Album of UFO Record Labels
J A N U A R Y	25	Snuff the Punk	P.O.D.	Debut
J A N U A R Y	25	Too High to Die	Meat Puppets	-
J A N U A R Y	27	Dies Irae	Noir Désir	Live
J A N U A R Y	31	Blackhawk	Blackhawk	-
J A N U A R Y	31	Cross Purposes	Black Sabbath	-
J A N U A R Y	31	Hold on It Hurts	Cornershop	-
J A N U A R Y	31	Under the Pink	Tori Amos	-
F E B R U A R Y	1	Dookie	Green Day	Diamond (10+ million copies sold)
F E B R U A R Y	1	Back at Your Ass for the Nine-4	2 Live Crew	-
F E B R U A R Y	1	Hank Flamingo	Hank Flamingo	-
F E B R U A R Y	1	Reality Bites	Various Artists	Soundtrack
F E B R U A R Y	1	What a Crying Shame	The Mavericks	-
F E B R U A R Y	2	SMAP 005	SMAP	-
F E B R U A R Y	7	Brave	Marillion	-
F E B R U A R Y	7	Motorcade of Generosity	Cake	Debut
F E B R U A R Y	7	Troublegum	Therapy?	-
F E B R U A R Y	7	24 Hour Revenge Therapy	Jawbreaker	-
F E B R U A R Y	8	Brainchild	Circle of Dust	-
F E B R U A R Y	8	For Your Own Special Sweetheart	Jawbox	-
F E B R U A R Y	8	No Doubt About It	Neal McCoy	-
F E B R U A R Y	8	Offering	Animal Bag	-
F E B R U A R Y	8	Paid Vacation	Richard Marx	-
F E B R U A R Y	8	Some Old Bullshit	Beastie Boys	-
F E B R U A R Y	8	Welcome to the Cruel World	Ben Harper	Debut
F E B R U A R Y	9	Dreamspace	Stratovarius	-
F E B R U A R Y	9	Prose Combat	MC Solaar	-
F E B R U A R Y	14	Crooked Rain, Crooked Rain	Pavement	-
F E B R U A R Y	14	Hex	Bark Psychosis	-
F E B R U A R Y	15	Angelfish	Angelfish	North America
F E B R U A R Y	15	Moonlight Becomes You	Willie Nelson	-
F E B R U A R Y	15	Pronounced Jah-Nay	Zhané	Debut
F E B R U A R Y	15	Ungod	Stabbing Westward	Debut
F E B R U A R Y	17	Transilvanian Hunger	Darkthrone	-
F E B R U A R Y	18	Emmerdale	The Cardigans	Debut
F E B R U A R Y	18	I Could Live in Hope	Low	Debut
F E B R U A R Y	21	In the Nightside Eclipse	Emperor	-
F E B R U A R Y	22	Beyond Flavor	Original Flavor	-
F E B R U A R Y	22	Gangsta Funk	5th Ward Boyz	-
F E B R U A R Y	22	Ro Sham Bo	The Grays	Debut
F E B R U A R Y	22	Stereopathetic Soulmanure	Beck	-
F E B R U A R Y	22	What Jail Is Like	The Afghan Whigs	EP
F E B R U A R Y	23	Hide Your Face	hide	Debut
F E B R U A R Y	24	The Principle of Evil Made Flesh	Cradle of Filth	Debut
F E B R U A R Y	28	Shock Me	Red House Painters	EP
F E B R U A R Y	28	Tiger Bay	Saint Etienne	-
F E B R U A R Y	28	Vikingligr Veldi	Enslaved	Debut
M A R C H	1	Robbin' the Hood	Sublime	-
M A R C H	1	Bewitched	Luna	-
M A R C H	1	The Funky Headhunter	M.C. Hammer	-
M A R C H	1	Glow	Raven	-
M A R C H	1	Live at the Acropolis	Yanni	Live
M A R C H	1	Mellow Gold	Beck	-
M A R C H	1	Naïve/Hell to Go	KMFDM	-
M A R C H	1	That Dog	That Dog	Debut
M A R C H	2	The 7th Blues	B'z	Double album
M A R C H	4	A Total Letdown	Babyland	-
M A R C H	7	Hit the Highway	The Proclaimers	-
M A R C H	7	Selected Ambient Works Volume II	Aphex Twin	
M A R C H	8	Backbeat	The Backbeat Band	Soundtrack
M A R C H	8	Brutal Youth	Elvis Costello	-
M A R C H	8	The Downward Spiral	Nine Inch Nails	4× Platinum
M A R C H	8	Hard to Earn	Gang Starr	-
M A R C H	8	Magnified	Failure	-
M A R C H	8	Martinis and Bikinis	Sam Phillips	-
M A R C H	8	Pirate Prude	Helium	Debut EP
M A R C H	8	Point Blank	Nailbomb	Debut
M A R C H	8	Pop Heiress	Chainsaw Kittens	-
M A R C H	8	Ringmaster	Insane Clown Posse	-
M A R C H	8	Superunknown	Soundgarden	5× Platinum
M A R C H	8	Your Filthy Little Mouth	David Lee Roth	-
M A R C H	14	The Door	Charlie Daniels	-
M A R C H	14	Forever Now	Level 42	-
M A R C H	14	Vauxhall and I	Morrissey	-
M A R C H	15	Chant	Benedictine Monks of Santo Domingo de Silos	Canto Gregoriano outside North America; re-release
M A R C H	15	Mötley Crüe	Mötley Crüe	-
M A R C H	15	Son of Altered Beast	Matthew Sweet	EP
M A R C H	15	Unboxed	Sammy Hagar	Greatest Hits +2 new tracks
M A R C H	21	Calculated	Heavens to Betsy	-
M A R C H	21	Essex	Alison Moyet	-
M A R C H	21	Talk	Yes	-
M A R C H	21	Up to Our Hips	The Charlatans	-
M A R C H	22	Longing in Their Hearts	Bonnie Raitt	-
M A R C H	22	Amor Prohibido	Selena	-
M A R C H	22	Woke Up with a Monster	Cheap Trick	-
M A R C H	22	Above the Rim	Various Artists	Soundtrack
M A R C H	22	Brother Sister	Brand New Heavies	-
M A R C H	22	Devil Hopping	Inspiral Carpets	-
M A R C H	22	Far Beyond Driven	Pantera	-
M A R C H	22	Fuck What You Think	Main Source	-
M A R C H	22	Mind Blowin	Vanilla Ice	-
M A R C H	22	Naveed	Our Lady Peace	Debut; Canadian release
M A R C H	22	New Plastic Ideas	Unwound	-
M A R C H	22	Not a Moment Too Soon	Tim McGraw	-
M A R C H	22	The Brian Setzer Orchestra	The Brian Setzer Orchestra	-
M A R C H	24	Black Hand Inn	Running Wild	-
M A R C H	25	True Force	Powerman 5000	Debut EP
M A R C H	28	The Division Bell	Pink Floyd	-
M A R C H	28	Give Out But Don't Give Up	Primal Scream	-
M A R C H	28	Now That's What I Call Music! 27	Various Artists	-
M A R C H	28	The Piano Concerto/MGV	Michael Nyman	-
M A R C H	28	Promenade	The Divine Comedy	-
M A R C H	29	The Crow	Various Artists	-
M A R C H	29	Groove Family Cyco	Infectious Grooves	-
M A R C H	29	Hoist	Phish	Gold
M A R C H	29	Talking Timbuktu	Ali Farka Touré with Ry Cooder	-
M A R C H	29	This Toilet Earth	Gwar	-
M A R C H	?	Panic On	Madder Rose	-
M A R C H	?	Rester vrai	Florent Pagny	-

=== April–June ===
Date		Album	Artist	Notes
A P R I L	1	Lunar Strain	In Flames	Debut
A P R I L	4	Rusty	Rodan	-
A P R I L	4	WhatFunLifeWas	Bedhead	-
A P R I L	4	The White Birch	Codeine	-
A P R I L	5	The Divine Comedy	Milla Jovovich	-
A P R I L	5	Shimmer	Surgery	-
A P R I L	5	Some Change	Boz Scaggs	-
A P R I L	5	To the Death	M.O.P.	-
A P R I L	8	Only One Moon	Prairie Oyster	Canada
A P R I L	8	Smash	The Offspring	6× Platinum and the best-selling independent label album of all time.
A P R I L	11	Crash! Boom! Bang!	Roxette	-
A P R I L	11	Sister Hazel	Sister Hazel	-
A P R I L	12	All-4-One	All-4-One	-
A P R I L	12	The Bleeding	Cannibal Corpse	-
A P R I L	12	Live Through This	Hole	-
A P R I L	12	Weight	Rollins Band	-
A P R I L	12	Sugartooth	Sugartooth	Debut
A P R I L	16	Naaah, Dis Kid Can't Be from Canada?!!	Maestro Fresh-Wes	-
A P R I L	18	Let Love In	Nick Cave and the Bad Seeds	-
A P R I L	18	And She Closed Her Eyes	Stina Nordenstam	-
A P R I L	18	His 'n' Hers	Pulp	-
A P R I L	18	How to Make Friends and Influence People	Terrorvision	-
A P R I L	19	Foolish	Superchunk	-
A P R I L	19	Crookt, Crackt, or Fly	Gastr del Sol	-
A P R I L	19	Illmatic	Nas	Debut
A P R I L	19	In My Wildest Dreams	Kenny Chesney	-
A P R I L	19	Well...	Katey Sagal	-
A P R I L	21	Australian Melodrama	The Triffids	-
A P R I L	25	Anarchy	Chumbawamba	-
A P R I L	25	Mädchen	Lucilectric	Germany
A P R I L	25	Parklife	Blur	-
A P R I L	25	Santa Monica '72	David Bowie	UK, Live
A P R I L	26	American Recordings	Johnny Cash	-
A P R I L	26	A Date with The Smithereens	The Smithereens	-
A P R I L	26	The Fatherless and the Widow	Sixpence None the Richer	-
A P R I L	26	Last Day on Earth	John Cale and Bob Neuwirth	-
A P R I L	26	On Anotha Level	Anotha Level	-
A P R I L	26	Read My Mind	Reba McEntire	-
A P R I L	26	Southernplayalisticadillacmuzik	OutKast	Debut
A P R I L	26	This Is Me	Randy Travis	-
A P R I L	26	Throwing Copper	Live	8× Platinum (US); 7× Platinum (Canada)
A P R I L	26	Yank Crime	Drive Like Jehu	-
A P R I L	29	Life in the Streets	Prince Ital Joe & Marky Mark	-
M A Y	2	1985	Enuff Z'Nuff	-
M A Y	2	Retreat from Memphis	The Mekons	
M A Y	3	Middle Class Revolt	The Fall	-
M A Y	3	The Sweetest Illusion	Basia	-
M A Y	3	Where It All Begins	The Allman Brothers Band	-
M A Y	4	Dark Funeral	Dark Funeral	EP
M A Y	9	Last of the Independents	The Pretenders	-
M A Y	9	The Seventh Sign	Yngwie Malmsteen	Europe
M A Y	9	Far from Home	Traffic	-
M A Y	9	The Very Best of Kenny G	Kenny G	Greatest Hits
M A Y	9	Now I'm a Cowboy	The Auteurs	-
M A Y	9	Fairytales of Slavery	Miranda Sex Garden	-
M A Y	10	Arrive All Over You	Danielle Brisebois	Debut
M A Y	10	Diary	Sunny Day Real Estate	Debut
M A Y	10	Experimental Jet Set, Trash and No Star	Sonic Youth	-
M A Y	10	Four Chords & Several Years Ago	Huey Lewis and The News	Covers of popular songs from the 1950s & '60s
M A Y	10	G. Love and Special Sauce	G. Love & Special Sauce	Gold (US)
M A Y	10	Swamp Ophelia	Indigo Girls	-
M A Y	10	Ten Feet Tall and Bulletproof	Travis Tritt	-
M A Y	10	Weezer	Weezer	Debut; 3× Platinum (US), 2× Platinum (Canada)
M A Y	16	I Say I Say I Say	Erasure	-
M A Y	17	Boingo	Oingo Boingo	-
M A Y	17	New Times	Violent Femmes	-
M A Y	17	A Night in San Francisco	Van Morrison	Live
M A Y	17	Recently	Dave Matthews Band	Live EP
M A Y	17	Storyteller	Crystal Waters	-
M A Y	20	Teenager of the Year	Frank Black	-
M A Y	23	Seal	Seal	aka Seal II
M A Y	23	Street Angel	Stevie Nicks	-
M A Y	23	Lifeforms	Future Sound of London	-
M A Y	24	David Byrne	David Byrne	-
M A Y	24	De Mysteriis Dom Sathanas	Mayhem	-
M A Y	24	Dulcinea	Toad the Wet Sprocket	-
M A Y	24	Everyone Should Be Killed	Anal Cunt	-
M A Y	24	Fruitcakes	Jimmy Buffett	-
M A Y	24	Heart, Soul & a Voice	Jon Secada	-
M A Y	24	Nuttin' But Love	Heavy D & the Boyz	-
M A Y	24	The Sun Rises in the East	Jeru the Damaja	Debut
M A Y	24	The Woman's Boat	Toni Childs	-
M A Y	25	Hai no Diamond	Glay	Debut
M A Y	25	Humanimal	Talisman	-
M A Y	31	199Quad	69 Boyz	-
M A Y	31	Así Es	Gerardo	-
M A Y	31	Fear, Emptiness, Despair	Napalm Death	-
M A Y	31	Goodbye to the Age of Steam	Big Big Train	-
M A Y	31	Ill Communication	Beastie Boys	3× Platinum (US)
M A Y	31	The Lion King: Original Motion Picture Soundtrack	Various Artists	-
M A Y	31	Mortal Kombat: The Album	The Immortals	-
M A Y	31	Way to Blue	Nick Drake	Compilation
M A Y	?	Love, Nancy	Nancy Wilson	-
M A Y	?	Dreamchild	Toyah	-
J U N E	1	76:14	Global Communication	Debut
J U N E	4	Oh My Love	Zard	-
J U N E	6	Balls to Picasso	Bruce Dickinson	Europe; released in US on 26 July
J U N E	6	Bad Boys Inc	Bad Boys Inc	-
J U N E	7	Pride & Glory	Pride & Glory	-
J U N E	7	Purple	Stone Temple Pilots	-
J U N E	7	Gems	Patti LaBelle	-
J U N E	7	Regulate... G Funk Era	Warren G	Debut
J U N E	7	Walk On	Boston	
J U N E	7	When Love Finds You	Vince Gill	-
J U N E	8	Pandora's Toys	Aerosmith (compilation)	-
J U N E	9	On and On	Masaharu Fukuyama	-
J U N E	10	Migratory Birds	Dave Wong	UFO Record Labels
J U N E	13	Amplified Heart	Everything but the Girl	-
J U N E	13	Pomme Fritz	The Orb	-
J U N E	13	Split	Lush	-
J U N E	13	Aria	Asia	-
J U N E	14	Age Ain't Nothing but a Number	Aaliyah	Debut
J U N E	14	Pure and Simple	Joan Jett and the Blackhearts	-
J U N E	14	Simpatico	Velocity Girl	-
J U N E	14	Suicidal for Life	Suicidal Tendencies	-
J U N E	14	Through the Fire	Peabo Bryson	-
J U N E	14	Turn It Upside Down	Spin Doctors	-
J U N E	14	Zingalamaduni	Arrested Development	-
J U N E	15	Deflowered	Pansy Division	-
J U N E	17	Sweet Revenge	Ryuichi Sakamoto	-
J U N E	17	Temple Stone	Ghost	Live
J U N E	20	Carnival of Light	Ride	-
J U N E	20	Genius and Brutality...Taste and Power	Brainbombs	-
J U N E	21	Betty	Helmet	-
J U N E	21	Bee Thousand	Guided by Voices	-
J U N E	21	Super Bad	Terminator X	-
J U N E	21	Creepin on ah Come Up	Bone Thugs-n-Harmony	EP
J U N E	21	Dance Naked	John Mellencamp	-
J U N E	21	Kiss My Ass: Classic Kiss Regrooved	Various Artists	Kiss tribute
J U N E	21	Lead Pipe	Grand Daddy I.U.	-
J U N E	21	Let's Go	Rancid	-
J U N E	22	Surface of Pain	Masquerade	-
J U N E	26	Klaus Schulze Goes Classic	Klaus Schulze	-
J U N E	27	Keb' Mo'	Keb' Mo'	Debut
J U N E	27	One Foot In The Grave	Beck	-
J U N E	27	Rise and Shine	Aswad	-
J U N E	28	Funkdafied	Da Brat	Debut
J U N E	28	Get Up on It	Keith Sweat	-
J U N E	28	MTV Unplugged: Tony Bennett	Tony Bennett	Live
J U N E	28	One Step Ahead of the Spider	MC 900 Ft. Jesus	-
J U N E	28	Same as It Ever Was	House of Pain	-
J U N E	28	Si Te Vas	Jon Secada	-
J U N E	28	Stand By for Pain	Widowmaker	-
J U N E	28	¡Viva Zapata!	7 Year Bitch	-
J U N E	28	Welcome to Sky Valley	Kyuss	-
J U N E	28	Who I Am	Alan Jackson	-
J U N E	30	Love Gone Sour, Suspicion, and Bad Debt	The Clarks	-

=== July–September ===
Date		Album	Artist	Notes
J U L Y	1	Gorgeous George	Edwyn Collins	-
J U L Y	1	Year of the Dog	Wolfstone	-
J U L Y	4	Music for the Jilted Generation	The Prodigy	-
J U L Y	5	Cracked Rear View	Hootie & the Blowfish	Diamond (10 million+ copies sold)
J U L Y	5	DGC Rarities Vol. 1	Various Artists	-
J U L Y	5	Hot Boxing	Magnapop	-
J U L Y	5	I Ain't Movin'	Des'ree	-
J U L Y	5	Liquor in the Front	The Reverend Horton Heat	-
J U L Y	5	Teenage Symphonies to God	Velvet Crush	-
J U L Y	5	Thirty Years of Maximum R&B	The Who	Box set
J U L Y	7	SMAP 006: Sexy Six	SMAP	-
J U L Y	8	Master of the Rings	Helloween	-
J U L Y	11	Voodoo Lounge	The Rolling Stones	-
J U L Y	11	Zopilote Machine	The Mountain Goats	-
J U L Y	12	Cowboys in Love	Riders in the Sky	-
J U L Y	12	Dewdrops in the Garden	Deee-Lite	-
J U L Y	12	Uncle Sam's Curse	Above the Law	-
J U L Y	12	downset.	downset.	Debut
J U L Y	12	Grassroots	311	-
J U L Y	12	Hungry for Stink	L7	-
J U L Y	12	The Kansas Boxed Set	Kansas	Box set
J U L Y	12	The Last Temptation	Alice Cooper	-
J U L Y	12	Tales from the Thousand Lakes	Amorphis	-
J U L Y	13	In the Trees	The Watchmen	Canada
J U L Y	14	Roman Candle	Elliott Smith	-
J U L Y	14	Tierra	L'Arc-en-Ciel	-
J U L Y	15	W.F.O.	Overkill	-
J U L Y	18	Parables for Wooden Ears	Powderfinger	Debut
J U L Y	18	The Space Age Playboys	Warrior Soul	-
J U L Y	18	Terminal Spirit Disease	At the Gates	-
J U L Y	19	Chief Boot Knocka	Sir Mix-a-Lot	-
J U L Y	19	For the Love of Strange Medicine	Steve Perry	-
J U L Y	19	Harbinger	Paula Cole	-
J U L Y	19	It Takes A Thief	Coolio	-
J U L Y	19	Peep This	Jamie Foxx	Debut
J U L Y	19	Portrait of an American Family	Marilyn Manson	Debut
J U L Y	19	Punk in Drublic	NOFX	-
J U L Y	19	We Come Strapped	MC Eiht	-
J U L Y	25	Chocolate Synthesizer	Boredoms	Japan only
J U L Y	25	Pandemonium	Killing Joke	-
J U L Y	25	These Are Not Fall Colors	Lync	-
J U L Y	26	Going Public	Newsboys	-
J U L Y	26	Gringo Honeymoon	Robert Earl Keen	-
J U L Y	26	Inside Out	Fates Warning	-
J U L Y	26	Out of Range	Ani DiFranco	-
J U L Y	26	Pawnshop Guitars	Gilby Clarke	-
J U L Y	27	Adesso	Toshinori Yonekura	-
J U L Y	29	Desire	Aaron Kwok	Chinese UFO Records
J U L Y	?	The Happy Album	The Selecter	-
A U G U S T	1	Now That's What I Call Music! 28	Various Artists	Compilation
A U G U S T	2	Push Comes to Shove	Jackyl	-
A U G U S T	2	Creep wit' Me	Ill Al Skratch	Debut
A U G U S T	2	Love Spit Love	Love Spit Love	Debut
A U G U S T	2	Playtyme Is Over	Immature	-
A U G U S T	2	The Tractors	The Tractors	-
A U G U S T	2	Rotting Piñata	Sponge	-
A U G U S T	2	Whaler	Sophie B. Hawkins	-
A U G U S T	5	Prick	Melvins	-
A U G U S T	8	Frigate	April Wine	-
A U G U S T	8	Snivilisation	Orbital	-
A U G U S T	8	When the Kite String Pops	Acid Bath	Debut
A U G U S T	9	Autogeddon	Julian Cope	-
A U G U S T	9	Burn My Eyes	Machine Head	Debut
A U G U S T	9	Mars Audiac Quintet	Stereolab	-
A U G U S T	9	6 Feet Deep	Gravediggaz	Debut
A U G U S T	10	Living Under June	Jann Arden	Canada
A U G U S T	15	Grace	Jeff Buckley	Europe
A U G U S T	16	After the Storm	Crosby, Stills & Nash	-
A U G U S T	16	Blue House	Marcia Ball	-
A U G U S T	16	Come	Prince	-
A U G U S T	16	Handful of Rain	Savatage	-
A U G U S T	16	Jerky Boys 2	Jerky Boys	-
A U G U S T	16	Maybe You Should Drive	Barenaked Ladies	-
A U G U S T	16	Picture Perfect Morning	Edie Brickell	-
A U G U S T	16	Sleeps with Angels	Neil Young and Crazy Horse	-
A U G U S T	16	Stress: The Extinction Agenda	Organized Konfusion	-
A U G U S T	18	Hard Hats	Phil Beer	-
A U G U S T	19	The Business Trip	Hawkwind	Live
A U G U S T	19	Songs in the Key of Bree	Buck-O-Nine	-
A U G U S T	22	Dummy	Portishead	Debut
A U G U S T	22	Everyone's Got One	Echobelly	UK
A U G U S T	22	Twelve Deadly Cyns...and Then Some	Cyndi Lauper	Compilation + new tracks
A U G U S T	22	Thirsty Work	Status Quo	-
A U G U S T	23	Bakesale	Sebadoh	-
A U G U S T	23	Bust a Nut	Tesla	-
A U G U S T	23	Clumsy	Samiam	-
A U G U S T	23	Cover Girl	Shawn Colvin	-
A U G U S T	23	Ken Mellons	Ken Mellons	-
A U G U S T	23	Muse Sick-n-Hour Mess Age	Public Enemy	-
A U G U S T	23	Natural Born Killers	Various Artists	Produced by Trent Reznor
A U G U S T	23	Natural Ingredients	Luscious Jackson	-
A U G U S T	23	Rhythm of Love	Anita Baker	-
A U G U S T	23	Rubberneck	Toadies	Debut
A U G U S T	23	Stoned & Dethroned	The Jesus and Mary Chain	-
A U G U S T	23	When I Woke	Rusted Root	-
A U G U S T	23	When Fallen Angels Fly	Patty Loveless	-
A U G U S T	23	Without a Sound	Dinosaur Jr.	-
A U G U S T	23	House of Love	Amy Grant	-
A U G U S T	27	Stuck	Puddle of Mudd	-
A U G U S T	30	Definitely Maybe	Oasis	Debut 7× platinum
A U G U S T	30	The Holy Bible	Manic Street Preachers	-
A U G U S T	30	Secret World Live	Peter Gabriel	Live
A U G U S T	30	Down	The Jesus Lizard	-
A U G U S T	30	Days in the Wake	Palace Brothers	-
A U G U S T	30	Segundo Romance	Luis Miguel	-
A U G U S T	30	Fresh soundtrack	Various Artists	-
A U G U S T	30	II	Boyz II Men	-
A U G U S T	30	Twice Removed	Sloan	-
A U G U S T	30	Usher	Usher	Debut
S E P T E M B E R	5	Change Giver	Shed Seven	UK release date; Debut album
S E P T E M B E R	5	Mamouna	Bryan Ferry	-
S E P T E M B E R	6	Ain't Life Grand	Widespread Panic	-
S E P T E M B E R	6	Born Dead	Body Count	-
S E P T E M B E R	6	File Under: Easy Listening	Sugar	-
S E P T E M B E R	6	Flesh	David Gray	-
S E P T E M B E R	6	LAND	Land	-
S E P T E M B E R	6	Stranger than Fiction	Bad Religion	-
S E P T E M B E R	6	The Sporting Life	Diamanda Galás	
S E P T E M B E R	6	U.S.A.	Flatlinerz	-
S E P T E M B E R	12	Universal Mother	Sinéad O'Connor	-
S E P T E M B E R	12	From the Cradle	Eric Clapton	Covers album
S E P T E M B E R	12	D.I. Go Pop	Disco Inferno	-
S E P T E M B E R	12	Disco 2	Pet Shop Boys	Remix album
S E P T E M B E R	12	The Shadowthrone	Satyricon	Remix album
S E P T E M B E R	13	Autopilot	The Samples	-
S E P T E M B E R	13	Break of Dawn	Rob Base & DJ E-Z Rock	-
S E P T E M B E R	13	Flyer	Nanci Griffith	-
S E P T E M B E R	13	Four	Blues Traveler	-
S E P T E M B E R	13	Friendly People	Guttermouth	-
S E P T E M B E R	13	If I Were A Carpenter	Various Artists	Carpenters tribute
S E P T E M B E R	13	John Henry	They Might Be Giants	-
S E P T E M B E R	13	Ready to Die	The Notorious B.I.G.	Debut
S E P T E M B E R	13	Red Hot + Country	Various Artists	Part of Red Hot Benefit series
S E P T E M B E R	13	Release	Cop Shoot Cop	-
S E P T E M B E R	13	Terry McBride & the Ride	McBride & the Ride	-
S E P T E M B E R	13	There's Nothing Wrong with Love	Built to Spill	-
S E P T E M B E R	19	Dos Dedos Mis Amigos	Pop Will Eat Itself	-
S E P T E M B E R	19	Kylie Minogue	Kylie Minogue	-
S E P T E M B E R	19	Vs the Greatest of All Time	Archers of Loaf	EP
S E P T E M B E R	20	I See It Now	Tracy Lawrence	-
S E P T E M B E R	20	Jamie Walters	Jamie Walters	Debut
S E P T E M B E R	20	Mighty Joe Moon	Grant Lee Buffalo	-
S E P T E M B E R	20	Project: Funk da World	Craig Mack	Debut
S E P T E M B E R	20	Whip-Smart	Liz Phair	-
S E P T E M B E R	23	Atofio Hrysafi	Katy Garbi	-
S E P T E M B E R	25	Dis Unu Fi Hear	Beenie Man	-
S E P T E M B E R	25	Speak Squeak Creak	Melt-Banana	-
S E P T E M B E R	26	In the Hot Seat	Emerson, Lake & Palmer	-
S E P T E M B E R	26	My Iron Lung	Radiohead	EP
S E P T E M B E R	26	Protection	Massive Attack	-
S E P T E M B E R	26	The Best Mixes from the Album Debut for All the People Who Don't Buy White Labels	Björk	Remix
S E P T E M B E R	26	Hot Trip to Heaven	Love & Rockets	-
S E P T E M B E R	26	Thug Life: Volume 1	2Pac	-
S E P T E M B E R	27	11 Tracks of Whack	Walter Becker	-
S E P T E M B E R	27	American Thighs	Veruca Salt	Debut
S E P T E M B E R	27	Boomtown	Toby Keith	-
S E P T E M B E R	27	Brandy	Brandy	Debut
S E P T E M B E R	27	Chocolate and Cheese	Ween	-
S E P T E M B E R	27	Deliverance	Corrosion of Conformity	-
S E P T E M B E R	27	Divine Intervention	Slayer	-
S E P T E M B E R	27	The Glory of Gershwin	Larry Adler/Various Artists	Gershwin tribute
S E P T E M B E R	27	The Great Subconscious Club	K's Choice	-
S E P T E M B E R	27	I Love Everybody	Lyle Lovett	-
S E P T E M B E R	27	Kermit Unpigged	The Muppets	-
S E P T E M B E R	27	Monster	R.E.M.	-
S E P T E M B E R	27	Permanent Record: Al in the Box	"Weird Al" Yankovic	Box Set
S E P T E M B E R	27	Pulp Fiction	Various Artists	Soundtrack
S E P T E M B E R	27	Ruby Vroom	Soul Coughing	Debut
S E P T E M B E R	27	Shade Business	PMD	-
S E P T E M B E R	27	Songs	Luther Vandross	-
S E P T E M B E R	27	Under the Table and Dreaming	Dave Matthews Band	Debut
S E P T E M B E R	27	Waitin' on Sundown	Brooks & Dunn	-
S E P T E M B E R	28	The Decline and Fall of Heavenly	Heavenly	-
S E P T E M B E R	30	Greater Art	Lake of Tears	Debut
S E P T E M B E R	30	Welcome to Tomorrow	Snap!	-
S E P T E M B E R	?	Helium	Pram	-

=== October–December ===
Date		Album	Artist	Notes
O C T O B E R
O C T O B E R	1	Overdose	Pizzicato Five	-
O C T O B E R	1	Purgatory Afterglow	Edge of Sanity	-
O C T O B E R	3	No Need to Argue	The Cranberries	7× Platinum (US); 5× Platinum (Canada/Europe)
O C T O B E R	4	Awake	Dream Theater	-
O C T O B E R	4	Christmas Spirit	Donna Summer	Christmas
O C T O B E R	4	Danzig 4	Danzig	-
O C T O B E R	4	Death Row	Accept	-
O C T O B E R	4	Greatest Hits: The Platinum Collection	Barry Manilow	Compilation
O C T O B E R	4	The Icon Is Love	Barry White	-
O C T O B E R	4	Low	Testament	-
O C T O B E R	4	Lucacentric	Lucas	-
O C T O B E R	4	Nativity in Black: A Tribute to Black Sabbath	Various Artists	Black Sabbath tribute
O C T O B E R	4	Night Music	Joe Jackson	-
O C T O B E R	4	Pisces Iscariot	The Smashing Pumpkins	Compilation of B-Sides/Unreleased material
O C T O B E R	4	Question the Answers	The Mighty Mighty Bosstones	-
O C T O B E R	4	Stones in the Road	Mary Chapin Carpenter	-
O C T O B E R	4	Vicious Circle	L.A. Guns	-
O C T O B E R	10	Dog Man Star	Suede	-
O C T O B E R	10	King of the Kill	Annihilator	-
O C T O B E R	10	The Cult	The Cult	-
O C T O B E R	10	Música de Rua	Daniela Mercury	-
O C T O B E R	10	Singin' with the Big Bands	Barry Manilow	-
O C T O B E R	11	Bumpin'	Dis-n-Dat	-
O C T O B E R	11	Clerks	Various Artists	Soundtrack
O C T O B E R	11	Colouz Uv Sound	Simple E	-
O C T O B E R	11	Country 'til I Die	John Anderson	-
O C T O B E R	11	D Generation	D Generation	-
O C T O B E R	11	Korn	Korn	Debut
O C T O B E R	11	Millennium	Front Line Assembly	-
O C T O B E R	11	Orange	The Jon Spencer Blues Explosion	-
O C T O B E R	14	Renaissance: The Mix Collection	Sasha and Digweed	Mix album
O C T O B E R	17	Move Me	Nazareth	-
O C T O B E R	17	The Return of the Space Cowboy	Jamiroquai	UK
O C T O B E R	17	Requiem	Bathory	-
O C T O B E R	17	Steam	East 17	-
O C T O B E R	18	Blowout Comb	Digable Planets	-
O C T O B E R	18	Cross Road	Bon Jovi	Compilation
O C T O B E R	18	The Diary	Scarface	-
O C T O B E R	18	Hold Me Thrill Me Kiss Me	Gloria Estefan	Covers CD
O C T O B E R	18	Genocide & Juice	The Coup	-
O C T O B E R	18	Law of the Jungle	Various artists	Compilation
O C T O B E R	18	Murder Was the Case	Various Artists	Soundtrack
O C T O B E R	18	Promised Land	Queensrÿche	-
O C T O B E R	18	Return to the Valley of The Go-Go's	The Go-Go's	Compilation +3 new tracks
O C T O B E R	18	Scratch the Surface	Sick of It All	-
O C T O B E R	18	Stoner Witch	Melvins	-
O C T O B E R	18	Trailer	Ash	Mini Album
O C T O B E R	18	Word...Life	O.C.	Debut
O C T O B E R	18	Worst Case Scenario	Deus	Debut
O C T O B E R	19	Humanimal Part 2	Talisman	EP
O C T O B E R	20	The Sea and Cake	The Sea and Cake	-
O C T O B E R	21	Future Listening!	Towa Tei	-
O C T O B E R	21	Love or Nothing	Miyuki Nakajima	-
O C T O B E R	21	Tears Laid in Earth	The 3rd and the Mortal	-
O C T O B E R	22	Landscapes	Shun	-
O C T O B E R	22	Neulainen Jerkunen	Absoluuttinen Nollapiste	-
O C T O B E R	23	Burn or Bury	Milk Cult	-
O C T O B E R	24	At Action Park	Shellac	-
O C T O B E R	24	The Best of Chris Rea	Chris Rea	-
O C T O B E R	24	Barangay Apo	Apo Hiking Society	-
O C T O B E R	24	Firin' in Fouta	Baaba Maal	-
O C T O B E R	24	Home	Deep Blue Something	RainMaker release
O C T O B E R	24	Homegrown	Dodgy	-
O C T O B E R	24	Mr. Moonlight	Foreigner	-
O C T O B E R	24	Oyster	Heather Nova	-
O C T O B E R	24	Sacrifice	Gary Numan	-
O C T O B E R	24	Starlite Walker	Silver Jews	-
O C T O B E R	24	Toward the Within	Dead Can Dance	Live
O C T O B E R	25	Bedtime Stories	Madonna	-
O C T O B E R	25	Bright Red	Laurie Anderson	-
O C T O B E R	25	Geek the Girl	Lisa Germano	-
O C T O B E R	25	Hospital	Gary Young	Solo Debut
O C T O B E R	25	Nervous Breakdown	Fu-Schnickens	-
O C T O B E R	25	Resurrection	Common Sense	-
O C T O B E R	25	Slippin' In	Buddy Guy	-
O C T O B E R	25	Time	Mercyful Fate	-
O C T O B E R	25	Turbulent Indigo	Joni Mitchell	-
O C T O B E R	25	Voodoo-U	Lords of Acid	-
O C T O B E R	25	Wildhoney	Tiamat	-
O C T O B E R	26	Dis Is da Drum	Herbie Hancock	
O C T O B E R	26	Mother	Luna Sea	-
O C T O B E R	26	Pokinatcha	MxPx	-
O C T O B E R	26	The Special Collectors Edition	Blur	Compilation of B-Sides
O C T O B E R	27	Personligt	Carola Häggkvist	-
O C T O B E R	28	Gang Affiliated	Gospel Gangstaz	-
O C T O B E R	28	Merry Christmas	Mariah Carey	Christmas songs
O C T O B E R	28	Same Old Tunes	Millencolin	-
O C T O B E R	31	The Best of Sade	Sade	Compilation
O C T O B E R	31	Thank You For The Music	ABBA	Europe; Box Set
O C T O B E R	?	San Francisco	American Music Club	-
N O V E M B E R	1	Amorica	The Black Crowes	-
N O V E M B E R	1	Big Ones	Aerosmith	Compilation
N O V E M B E R	1	The Good, the Bad, and the Argyle	The Bouncing Souls	-
N O V E M B E R	1	Healing Hands of Time	Willie Nelson	-
N O V E M B E R	1	Letters Never Sent	Carly Simon	-
N O V E M B E R	1	Love and Honor	Ricky Van Shelton	-
N O V E M B E R	1	Mighty Morphin Power Rangers the Album: A Rock Adventure	Ron Wasserman	-
N O V E M B E R	1	MTV Unplugged in New York	Nirvana	Live
N O V E M B E R	1	Out in L.A.	Red Hot Chili Peppers	Compilation
N O V E M B E R	1	Planet of da Apes	Da Lench Mob	-
N O V E M B E R	1	Sixteen Stone	Bush	Debut; 6× Platinum
N O V E M B E R	1	Wildflowers	Tom Petty	-
N O V E M B E R	1	Youthanasia	Megadeth	-
N O V E M B E R	3	Giant Robot	Buckethead	-
N O V E M B E R	4	Psyche	PJ & Duncan	-
N O V E M B E R	7	No Quarter: Jimmy Page and Robert Plant Unledded	Page and Plant	Live
N O V E M B E R	7	Fields of Gold: The Best of Sting 1984-1994	Sting	Compilation +2 new tracks
N O V E M B E R	7	Amber	Autechre	
N O V E M B E R	8	A Low Down Dirty Shame	Various Artists	Soundtrack
N O V E M B E R	8	Athos	Stephan Micus	-
N O V E M B E R	8	Endless Summer: Donna Summer's Greatest Hits	Donna Summer	Compilation +2 new tracks
N O V E M B E R	8	Hell Freezes Over	Eagles	Live/Studio
N O V E M B E R	8	Higher Power	Big Audio	-
N O V E M B E R	8	Lookin' Back at Myself	Aaron Tippin	-
N O V E M B E R	8	Lost in the Former West	The Fatima Mansions	-
N O V E M B E R	8	The Main Ingredient	Pete Rock & CL Smooth	-
N O V E M B E R	8	The Most Beautifullest Thing in This World	Keith Murray	-
N O V E M B E R	8	None	Meshuggah	EP
N O V E M B E R	8	Still Climbing	Cinderella	-
N O V E M B E R	8	Woodstock 94	Various Artists	-
N O V E M B E R	14	Bizarre Fruit	M People	-
N O V E M B E R	14	More Pink: The B-Sides	Tori Amos	Australia/New Zealand
N O V E M B E R	14	A Very Special Season	Diana Ross	Christmas
N O V E M B E R	15	Ass, Gas, or Cash (No One Rides for Free)	K-Dee	-
N O V E M B E R	15	CrazySexyCool	TLC	Diamond status, 23 million+ copies sold
N O V E M B E R	15	Duets II	Frank Sinatra	-
N O V E M B E R	15	Fate (with Utha Likumahuwa crying-saxophone and Harvey Malaiholo composer)	Andy Lau	UFO Record Finale
N O V E M B E R	15	Tical	Method Man	-
N O V E M B E R	21	Bonsai Superstar	Brainiac	-
N O V E M B E R	21	Don't Ask	Tina Arena	-
N O V E M B E R	21	Now That's What I Call Music! 29	Various Artists	Compilation
N O V E M B E R	21	Pulse	Megumi Hayashibara	-
N O V E M B E R	21	The Songs of Distant Earth	Mike Oldfield	-
N O V E M B E R	22	Behind Bars	Slick Rick	-
N O V E M B E R	22	The Black Album	Prince	Recorded 1986–'87
N O V E M B E R	22	Bootlegs & B-Sides	Ice Cube	Compilation
N O V E M B E R	22	Box of Fire	Aerosmith	Box Set
N O V E M B E R	22	Dare Iz a Darkside	Redman	-
N O V E M B E R	22	Laura Pausini	Laura Pausini	-
N O V E M B E R	22	Miracles: The Holiday Album	Kenny G	Christmas
N O V E M B E R	22	Niandra LaDes and Usually Just a T-Shirt	John Frusciante	-
N O V E M B E R	22	Vitalogy	Pearl Jam	-
N O V E M B E R	25	Blasphemy Made Flesh	Cryptopsy	-
N O V E M B E R	25	Manhole	Manhole	Debut album
N O V E M B E R	26	Frost	Enslaved	-
N O V E M B E R	28	Haunted Dancehall	The Sabres of Paradise	-
N O V E M B E R	29	The Impossible Bird	Nick Lowe	-
N O V E M B E R	29	My Life	Mary J. Blige	-
N O V E M B E R	30	Live at the BBC	The Beatles	Recorded 1963–65
N O V E M B E R	?	Cardinal	Cardinal	Debut
N O V E M B E R	?	Och du tände stjärnorna	Thorleifs	-
D E C E M B E R	5	Second Coming	The Stone Roses	UK
D E C E M B E R	6	Ambushed	Da Bush Babees	-
D E C E M B E R	6	Non-Fiction	Black Sheep	-
D E C E M B E R	6	The Sweetest Days	Vanessa Williams	-
D E C E M B E R	12	Fishing for Luckies	The Wildhearts	-
D E C E M B E R	12	Rapid City Muscle Car	Cherry Poppin' Daddies	-
D E C E M B E R	13	The Hits	Garth Brooks	Compilation
D E C E M B E R	13	Interview with the Vampire	Various Artists	Soundtrack
D E C E M B E R	13	Maná en Vivo	Maná	Live
D E C E M B E R	20	Keep the Fire Burnin'	Dan Hartman	Compilation +2 new tracks
D E C E M B E R	21	Heavy Metal Hippies	Loudness	-
D E C E M B E R	?	Jimmy Eat World	Jimmy Eat World	Debut

=== Release date unknown ===
- Acoustic - Nitty Gritty Dirt Band
- Answer the Phone, Dummy - Fastbacks
- Big Bad Voodoo Daddy – Big Bad Voodoo Daddy
- Bjesovi – Bjesovi
- Blue Room – Unwritten Law
- The Brooklyn Side – The Bottle Rockets
- Chippy – Various arists
- The Church Within – The Obsessed
- Churn – Seven Mary Three
- Clocking Out Is for Suckers – Drake Tungsten
- Danzón (Dance On) – Arturo Sandoval
- Glum – Giant Sand
- Obaa Sima – Ata Kak
- Dial Hard – Gotthard
- Halo in a Haystack – Converge
- Hellig Usvart – Horde
- I Hope Your Heart Is Not Brittle – Portastatic
- Imagínate – Menudo
- K... jego mać – Sedes
- Mi Forma De Sentir – Pedro Fernández
- MoodSwing – Joshua Redman Quartet
- Naghmet Hob – Najwa Karam
- No, No, No – Dawn Penn
- Parallel Universe – 4hero
- Patashnik – Biosphere
- Peter Frampton – Peter Frampton
- Puno't Dulo – The Dawn
- Quick – Far
- Safe Sex Designer Drugs & the Death of Rock 'N' Roll – Baby Chaos
- Soda Pop * Rip Off – Slant 6
- Songs for the Daily Planet – Todd Snider
- Swept Away – Jesse Colin Young
- Television - Dr. John
- Too Bad Jim – R. L. Burnside
- Tortoise – Tortoise
- Unknown Territory – Dick Dale
- The Walls We Bounce Off Of – John Hartford
- X Man – Andrew Cyrille

== Biggest hit singles ==
The following songs achieved the highest chart positions. in the charts of 1994.

#	Artist	Title	Year	Country	Chart entries
1	Bruce Springsteen	Streets of Philadelphia	1994	(United States)	Austria 1 – Apr 1994, Norway 1 – Feb 1994, Poland 1 – Feb 1994, Germany 1 – Mar 1994, Republic of Ireland 1 – Mar 1994, Oscar in 1993, UK 2 – Mar 1994, Switzerland 2 – Mar 1994, Italy 3 of 1994, France 4 – Feb 1994, Holland 6 – Feb 1994, RYM 6 of 1994, Sweden 7 – Feb 1994, US BB 9 of 1994, Europe 29 of the 1990s, US BB 30 of 1994, Australia 30 of 1994, US CashBox 49 of 1994, POP 63 of 1994, AFI 68, Germany 74 of the 1990s, WXPN 837
2	Bryan Adams & Rod Stewart & Sting	All For Love	1994	(Canada) / (United Kingdom)	US BB 1 of 1994, Sweden 1 – Dec 1993, Austria 1 – Feb 1994, Switzerland 1 – Jan 1994, Norway 1 – Jan 1994, Poland 1 – Dec 1993, Germany 1 – Jan 1994, Republic of Ireland 1 – Jan 1994, Australia 1 for 2 weeks Apr 1994, UK 2 – Jan 1994, Holland 3 – Jan 1994, US BB 9 of 1994, Italy 9 of 1994, Australia 10 of 1994, US CashBox 22 of 1994, POP 25 of 1994, Germany 87 of the 1990s
3	Rednex	Cotton-Eyed Joe	1994	(Sweden)	UK 1 – Dec 1994, US BB 1 of 1995, Holland 1 – Aug 1994, Sweden 1 – Aug 1994, Austria 1 – Oct 1994, Switzerland 1 – Oct 1994, Norway 1 – Oct 1994, Germany 1 – Jan 1995, New Zealand 1 for 6 weeks Mar 1995, POP 1 of 1995, Germany 18 of the 1990s, US BB 25 of 1995, Australia 41 of 1995, Party 54 of 2007, Scrobulate 72 of party
4	All-4-One	I Swear	1994	(United States)	US BB 1 of 1994, Holland 1 – Jul 1994, Austria 1 – Aug 1994, Switzerland 1 – Jul 1994, Germany 1 – Jul 1994, New Zealand 1 for 6 weeks Jul 1994, Australia 1 for 5 weeks Nov 1994, UK 2 – Jun 1994, Norway 2 – Jul 1994, Australia 2 of 1994, US CashBox 3 of 1994, Sweden 3 – Aug 1994, US BB 7 of 1994, Poland 14 – Jul 1994, Germany 39 of the 1990s, OzNet 657
5	Mariah Carey	Without You	1994	(United States)	UK 1 – Feb 1994, Holland 1 – Feb 1994, Sweden 1 – Feb 1994, Austria 1 – Apr 1994, Switzerland 1 – Apr 1994, Poland 1 – Feb 1994, Germany 1 – Mar 1994, Republic of Ireland 1 – Feb 1994, New Zealand 1 for 1 weeks Apr 1994, US BB 3 of 1994, Norway 3 – Mar 1994, US CashBox 15 of 1994, Australia 15 of 1994, Germany 25 of the 1990s, POP 37 of 1994

== Top 40 Chart hit singles ==
Song title	Artist(s)	Release date(s)	US	UK	Highest chart position	Other Chart Performance(s)
"100% Pure Love"	Crystal Waters	April 1994	11	15	2 (Australia)	See chart performance entry
"21st Century (Digital Boy)"	Bad Religion	1994	n/a	41	1 (Hungary)	11 (U.S. Billboard Alternative Airplay - Hungary [Single Top 40]) - 32 (Austria) - 41 (Germany)
"About a Girl (Unplugged)"	Nirvana	October 1994	n/a	185	1 (Iceland)	See chart performance entry
"Absolutely Fabulous"	Pet Shop Boys	June 1994	n/a	6	2 (Australia, New Zealand)	See chart performance entry
"All I Wanna Do"	Sheryl Crow	April 1994	2	4	1 (Australia, Canada)	See chart performance entry
"All I Want for Christmas Is You"	Mariah Carey	October 1994	1	1	1 (26 countries)	See chart performance entry
"Always"	Bon Jovi	September 1994	4	2	1 (6 countries)	See chart performance entry
"Always"	Erasure	April 1994	20	4	1 (Israel, Lithuania)	See chart performance entry
"Amor Prohibido"	Selena	April 1994	n/a	n/a	1 (Mexico)	See chart performance entry
"An Angel"	The Kelly Family	June 1994	n/a	69	1 (Austria)	2 (Austria, Switzerland) - 5 (Ireland) - 40 (Netherlands)
"Another Day"	Whigfield	August 1994	n/a	7	3 (Denmark, Italy)	See chart performance entry
"Any Time, Any Place"	Janet Jackson	May 1994	2	13	2 (United States)	See chart performance entry
"Anytime You Need a Friend"	Mariah Carey	May 1994	12	8	1 (Finland)	See chart performance entry
"Around the World"	East 17	May 1994	n/a	3	1 (Israel)	See chart performance entry
"Away from Home"	Dr. Alban	May 1994	n/a	42	2 (Finland, Netherlands (Dutch Top 40)	See chart performance entry

=== Other chart hit singles ===
- "Baby, Come Back" – Pato Banton & UB40
- "Baby, I Love Your Way" – Big Mountain (#1 Denmark, Spain and Sweden)
- "Back & Forth" – Aaliyah (#5 US)
- "Be Happy" – Mary J. Blige
- "Basket Case" – Green Day (#3 Sweden, #7 UK)
- "Because of Love" – Janet Jackson
- "Bidi Bidi Bom Bom" – Selena (#8 Mexico)
- "Big Yellow Taxi" – Amy Grant
- "Black Hole Sun" – Soundgarden (#1 Iceland, #5 Canada)
- "Buddy Holly" – Weezer
- "Bump n' Grind" – R. Kelly
- "Can You Feel the Love Tonight" – Elton John
- "Carry Me Home" - Gloworm
- "Chains" – Tina Arena (#4 Australia, #6 UK)
- "Cigarettes & Alcohol" – Oasis
- "Circle of Life" – Elton John
- "Closer" – Nine Inch Nails (#3 Australia)
- "Come On You Reds" – The Manchester United Football Squad (#1 UK and Denmark)
- "Cornflake Girl" – Tori Amos
- "Confide in Me" – Kylie Minogue
- "Cotton-Eyed Joe" – Rednex
- "Crazy" – Aerosmith
- "C.R.E.A.M." – Wu-Tang Clan
- "Creep" – TLC
- "Dedicated to the One I Love" – Bitty McLean
- "Dimension Divertida" – Paco Pil (#1 Spain)
- "Dissident" – Pearl Jam
- "Donde Quiera Que Estés" – Barrio Boyzz & Selena
- "Don't Follow" – Alice in Chains
- "Don't Turn Around" – Ace of Base
- "Doop" – Doop
- "Do You Wanna Get Funky" - C+C Music Factory
- "Dreams" – The Cranberries
- "Dreams (Will Come Alive)" – 2 Brothers on the 4th Floor
- "Dromen zijn bedrog" – Marco Borsato (#1 Netherlands)
- "Drop Dead Beautiful" – Six Was Nine (#1 in South Africa, #3 in Iceland)
- "Dry County" – Bon Jovi
- "Eins, Zwei, Polizei" – Mo-Do (#1 Austria, Germany and Italy)
- "Endless Love" – Luther Vandross and Mariah Carey
- "Everybody" – DJ BoBo
- "Everybody Gonfi-Gon" – 2 Cowboys
- "Everybody on the Floor (Pump It)" – Tokyo Ghetto Pussy
- "Everyday" – Phil Collins
- "Everything Changes" – Take That
- "Fade into You" – Mazzy Star
- "Fantastic Voyage" – Coolio
- "Feel the Heat of the Night" – Masterboy
- "Feeling So Real" – Moby
- "Flava In Ya Ear" – Craig Mack
- "Flying High" – Captain Hollywood Project (#3 Europe)
- "Forever Young" - Interactive
- "Found Out About You" – Gin Blossoms (#3 Canada)
- "Fotos y Recuerdos" – Selena
- "Foule sentimentale" – Alain Souchon (#1 France)
- "Funkdafied" – Da Brat
- "Games People Play" – Inner Circle (#4 New Zealand, #7 Sweden and Switzerland)
- "Gin & Juice" – Snoop Doggy Dogg
- "Girl, You'll Be a Woman Soon" - Urge Overkill
- "Girls & Boys" – Blur
- "Give Me All Your Love" – Magic Affair (#3 Finland, #4 Denmark)
- "Gotta Get Away" – The Offspring
- "Happy Nation" – Ace of Base (#1 Denmark, Finland, France, Israel)
- "Here Comes the Hotstepper" – Ini Kamoze (#1 New Zealand and US)
- "Hey Now (Girls Just Want to Have Fun)" - Cyndi Lauper
- "Hold On" - Jamie Walters (#2 Sweden, #3 Norway)
- "Hyper Hyper" – Scooter (#1 Spain, #2 Austria and Germany)
- "I Alone" – Live
- "I Like to Move It" – Reel 2 Real
- "I Show You Secrets" – Pharao (#3 Finland, #5 Austria)
- "I Stay Away" – Alice in Chains
- "I Wanna Be Down" – Brandy
- "If I Only Knew" - Tom Jones
- "I'll Make Love to You" – Boyz II Men
- "I'll Remember" – Madonna
- "I'll Stand by You" – The Pretenders
- "I'll Take You There" - General Public
- "I Love Saturday" - Erasure
- "In Your Room" – Depeche Mode
- "Infected" – Bad Religion
- "Inside" – Stiltskin
- "Inside Your Dreams" – U96 (#1 Finland, #9 Switzerland)
- "Interstate Love Song" – Stone Temple Pilots (#2 Iceland)
- "Is This the Love" – Masterboy
- "It Takes Me Away" – Marusha (#3 Germany)
- "It's Alright" – East 17 (#1 Australia, Ireland and Israel)
- "It's a Rainy Day" – Ice MC
- "I Will Survive (La La La)" - Hermes House Band
- "Je danse le Mia" – IAM
- "Jessie" – Joshua Kadison
- "Juicy" – Notorious B.I.G.
- "La solitudine" – Laura Pausini (#1 Belgium, Italy and Netherlands)
- "Let the Beat Control Your Body" – 2 Unlimited
- "Let the Beat Go On" – Dr. Alban
- "Let the Dream Come True" – DJ BoBo
- "Live Forever" – Oasis
- "Living in Danger" – Ace of Base
- "Longview" – Green Day
- "Look Who's Talking" – Dr Alban (#1 Denmark)
- "Loser" – Beck
- "Lost in America" – Alice Cooper
- "Love Ain't Here Anymore" – Take That
- "Love Is All Around" – Wet Wet Wet (#1 UK)
- "Love Is Strong" – Rolling Stones
- "Love Religion" – U96
- "Love Song" – Mark 'Oh (#5 Germany, #8 Switzerland)
- "Love Spreads" – The Stone Roses
- "Lucky One" – Amy Grant
- "Mädchen" – Lucilectric
- "Mamá Yo Quiero" - King África
- "Mary Jane's Last Dance" – Tom Petty & The Heartbreakers (#5 Canada)
- "Mass Appeal" – Gangstarr
- "(Meet) The Flintstones" – The B-52's
- "Mishale" - Andru Donalds
- "Mmm Mmm Mmm Mmm" – Crash Test Dummies
- "The Most Beautiful Girl in the World" – Prince
- "Move It Up" – Cappella (#6 Finland, Netherlands)
- "Move on Baby" – Cappella (#1 Europe)
- "Mr. Jones" – Counting Crows (#1 Canada)
- "Never Lie" – Immature (#5 US)
- "No Excuses" – Alice in Chains
- "No Good (Start the Dance)" – The Prodigy (#1 Finland, Greece)
- "No More (I Can't Stand It)" – Maxx
- "No Me Queda Mas" – Selena
- "No One" – 2 Unlimited
- "Now and Forever" – Richard Marx (#6 Canada, #7 US)
- "Omen III" – Magic Affair
- "On Bended Knee" – Boyz II Men
- "Only One Road" – Celine Dion
- "Penso Positivo" – Jovanotti (#2 Italy)
- "Please Come Home for Christmas" - Bon Jovi
- "The Real Thing" – 2 Unlimited
- "The Real Thing" – Tony Di Bart
- "Regulate" – Warren G & Nate Dogg
- "Renaissance" - M People
- "Return to Innocence" – Enigma (#1 Ireland, Norway, Sweden, Zimbabwe, #2 Denmark, #3 UK)
- "The Ride" – Basic Element
- "Right Beside You" – Sophie B. Hawkins (#7 Canada, #8 Switzerland)
- "Rock and Roll Dreams Come Through" - Meat Loaf
- "Rock My Heart" – Haddaway (#1 Israel, #4 Finland)
- "Rocks" - Primal Scream
- "Run Away" – Real McCoy (#3 US, #4 Australia, Finland, #5 Zimbabwe)
- "Run to the Sun" – Erasure
- "Sabotage" – Beastie Boys
- "Saturday Night" – Whigfield
- "Secret" – Madonna
- "Seether" – Veruca Salt
- "Self Esteem" – The Offspring (#1 Iceland, Norway, Sweden, #3 Finland)
- "Sensualité" – Axelle Red (#2 France, #6 Belgium)
- "Set the World on Fire" – E-Type
- "Seven Seconds" – Neneh Cherry & Youssou N'dour (#1 Finland, France, Greece, Italy, Switzerland)
- "Shine" – Aswad (#4 Iceland, #5 UK)
- "Shine" – Collective Soul
- "Short Dick Man" – 20 Fingers & Gillette (#1 France, Italy)
- "Si Una Vez" – Selena
- "Sight for Sore Eyes" - M People
- "The Sign" – Ace of Base
- "Sleeping in My Car" – Roxette
- "Somewhere Over the Rainbow" – Marusha
- "Spin the Black Circle" – Pearl Jam
- "Spoonman" – Soundgarden
- "Stay Another Day" – East 17
- "Stay (I Missed You)" – Lisa Loeb
- "Stay Together" – Suede
- "Strani amori" – Laura Pausini
- "Streets of Philadelphia" – Bruce Springsteen
- "Strong Enough" – Sheryl Crow
- "Sukiyaki" – 4 P.M. (#3 Australia, #8 US)
- "Summer in the City" – Joe Cocker
- "Supersonic" – Oasis
- "Sure" – Take That
- "Sure Shot" – Beastie Boys
- "Swamp Thing" – The Grid
- "Sweet Dreams" – La Bouche (#1 Europe)
- "Sweets for My Sweet" – C. J. Lewis (#3 UK)
- "Take a Bow" – Madonna
- "Tears Don't Lie" – Mark 'Oh
- "Techno Cumbia" – Selena
- "There is a Star" – Pharao
- "Things Can Only Get Better" – D Ream
- "Think About the Way" – Ice MC
- "Think Twice" – Celine Dion
- "This D.J." – Warren G
- "This Is the Way" – E-Type
- "Thuggish Ruggish Bone" – Bone Thugs-N-Harmony
- "Touch" – Basic Element (#3 Sweden, #7 Finland, #9 Denmark)
- "Trouble " – Shampoo
- "Turn the Beat Around" – Gloria Estefan
- "Twist and Shout" – Chaka Demus & Pliers
- "U & Me" – Cappella
- "U R the Best Thing (Perfecto Remix)" - D:Ream
- "Undone - The Sweater Song" – Weezer
- "United" – Prince Ital Joe & Marky Mark
- "What's My Name" – Snoop Doggy Dogg
- "Welcome to Paradise" – Green Day
- "Welcome to Tomorrow (Are You Ready?)" – Snap! (#1 Finland, #4 Belgium, #6 UK)
- "What's up" – DJ Miko
- "What's the Frequency, Kenneth?" – R.E.M.
- "Whatta Man" – Salt-n-Pepa & En Vogue
- "When I Come Around" – Green Day
- "When We Dance" - Sting
- "White Dove" - Scorpions
- "Wild Night" – John Mellencamp & Me'shell Ndegeocello
- "Without You" – Mariah Carey
- "Yesterday, When I Was Mad" - Pet Shop Boys
- "You Don't Know How It Feels" - Tom Petty
- "You Mean the World to Me" - Toni Braxton
- "You Want This" – Janet Jackson
- "Zombie" – The Cranberries

== Notable singles ==
Song title	Artist(s)	Release date(s)	Other Chart Performance(s)
"In Your Room"	Depeche Mode	January 1994	See chart performance entry

=== Other Notable singles ===
- "In the Neighbourhood" - Sisters Underground

== Classical music ==
- Thomas Beveridge – Yizkor Requiem
- George Crumb – Quest for guitar, soprano saxophone, harp, double bass, and percussion (two players)
- Richard Danielpour – Cello Concerto
- Mario Davidovsky – Festino for guitar, viola, violoncello, contrabass
- Peter Maxwell Davies – Symphony No. 5
- David Diamond – Trio for violin, clarinet and piano
- Lorenzo Ferrero
  - Paesaggio con figura for small orchestra
  - Portrait for string quartet
- Osvaldo Golijov – The Dreams and Prayers of Isaac the Blind
- Vagn Holmboe – Symphony No. 13, M.362 (begun 1993)
- Guus Janssen – Klotz, for violin, hi-hat and small ensemble
- Karl Jenkins – Adiemus: Songs of Sanctuary
- Wojciech Kilar – Reign Over Us, Christ, for voice and piano
- Oliver Knussen – Horn Concerto
- György Kurtág – Stele
- Morten Lauridsen – O magnum mysterium
- Frederik Magle – Concerto for organ and orchestra The Infinite Second
- Thea Musgrave – Journey through a Japanese Landscape, for marimba and wind
- Tristan Murail – L'esprit des dunes
- Michael Nyman – Concerto for Trombone
- Einojuhani Rautavaara – Symphony No. 7 Angel of Light
- Steve Reich
  - City Life
  - Bagoya Marimbas
- Robert Simpson – String Quintet No. 2 (1991–94)
- Karlheinz Stockhausen – Weltraum (electronic music from Freitag aus Licht)
- Boris Tishchenko – Symphony No. 7
- Charles Wuorinen
  - Lightenings VIII, for soprano and piano
  - Piano Quintet
  - Christes Crosse, for soprano and piano
  - Percussion Quartet
  - Guitar Variations
  - Windfall, for wind ensemble

== Opera ==
- Peter Maxwell Davies – The Doctor of Myddfai
- Jonathan Dove – Siren Song
- Vivian Fine – Memoirs of Uliana Rooney
- Adam Guettel – Floyd Collins
- Nicholas Lens – The Accacha Chronicles Trilogy: Flamma Flamma – The Fire Requiem
- Tobias Picker – Emmeline, libretto by JD McClatchy
- Alice Shields – Apocalypse
- Karlheinz Stockhausen – Freitag aus Licht (completed; not staged until 1996)

== Musical theater ==
- Beauty and the Beast – Broadway production opened at the Palace Theatre and ran for 5461 performances
- Carousel (Rodgers & Hammerstein) – Broadway revival
- Damn Yankees (Richard Adler and Jerry Ross) – Broadway revival
- Grease – Broadway revival
- Show Boat (Jerome Kern and Oscar Hammerstein II) – Broadway revival
- Sunset Boulevard (Andrew Lloyd Webber) – Broadway production opened at the Minskoff Theatre and ran for 977 performances

== Musical films ==
- Aag Aur Chingari
- Andaz, with music by Bappi Lahiri
- Airheads
- Backbeat
- Chaand Kaa Tukdaa, starring Sridevi
- Fear of a Black Hat
- Gandugali, with music by Sadhu Kokila.
- Hated: GG Allin and the Murder Junkies
- Hum Aapke Hain Koun..!, with music by Raamlaxman
- Immortal Beloved, biopic of Ludwig van Beethoven
- The Lion King – animated feature film with songs by Elton John and Tim Rice
- Min fynske barndom, biopic of composer Carl Nielsen
- Sukham Sukhakaram, with music by Ravindra Jain.
- The Swan Princess – animated feature film
- That's Entertainment! III
- Thumbelina – animated feature film.

== Births ==
- January 6 – Catriona Gray, Australian model, presenter, singer and beauty queen
- January 8 – Tanika Anderson, Australian actress, singer and performer (Hi-5)
- January 13 – Asta, Australian singer-songwriter
- January 14 – Kai, Korean singer and dancer (EXO)
- January 18
  - Minzy, South Korean singer, rapper and dancer
  - Jiyoung, South Korean singer and actress
- January 23 – Vera Blue, Australian indie singer-songwriter
- January 28 – Maluma, Colombian singer and rapper
- February 1
  - Skylar Laine, American singer-songwriter
  - Harry Styles, British musician, singer-songwriter, activist, (pop singer of boy band One Direction) (worked with Taylor Swift, Mabel, Stevie Nicks, Kacey Musgraves)
- February 3 – Orla Gartland, Irish singer, songwriter and YouTuber (member of band Fizz)
- February 8 – Nikki Yanofsky, Canadian singer
- February 10 – Seulgi, Korean singer and dancer (Red Velvet)
- February 14
  - Paul Butcher, American actor and singer
  - Becky Hill, English singer and songwriter
- February 16
  - Ava Max, American singer-songwriter
  - Shae, Indonesian actress and singer
- February 17 – Angie Miller, American singer-songwriter and pianist
- February 18 – J-Hope, South Korean rapper, songwriter, dancer and record producer, member of BTS
- February 21 – Wendy, Korean singer (Red Velvet)
- February 22 – Rachael Leahcar, (Italian) Australian multi lingual singer-songwriter, musician, performer, writer, runner, composer, and runner composer (The Voice (Australia)) (team and toured with Delta Goodrem)
- February 23 – Little Simz, English rapper, singer and actress
- February 24 – Earl Sweatshirt, American rapper
- February 28 – Jake Bugg, English singer-songwriter and musician
- March 1 – Justin Bieber, Canadian singer
- March 3
  - Sam Asghari, Iranian-American actor, dancer, fitness guru, businessman, business owner and model (Formerly married & muse to Britney Spears)
  - Hanne Verbruggen, Belgian singer, actress, and television presenter (K3)
- March 10 – Bad Bunny, Puerto Rican Latin trap and reggaeton singer.
- March 11 – Jace Chan, Hong Kong singer and actress
- March 12 – Christina Grimmie, American singer, songwriter, musician, multi-instrumentalist, actress and YouTuber (d. 2016)
- March 14 – Ansel Elgort, American actor, singer and DJ
- March 16 – Camilo, Colombian singer, musician and songwriter. (Married to Evaluna Montaner)
- March 17 – Amber Holcomb, American singer
- March 19 – Fletcher, American actress, singer, and songwriter.
- March 20 – R'Bonney Gabriel, American model, fashion designer and beauty pageant
- March 22 – Dax, Canadian rapper
- March 28
  - Dreezy, American hip hop recording artist, rapper, musician
  - Jackson Wang, Hong Kong rapper
- March 29 – Sulli, singer and actress (d. 2019)
- April 1 – Ella Eyre, English singer-songwriter
- April 4 – Risako Sugaya, Japanese singer
- April 9 – Bladee, Swedish rapper, singer, songwriter, fashion designer and member of the musical group Drain Gang.
- April 11 – Duncan Laurence, Dutch singer-songwriter, winner of Eurovision Song Contest 2019
- April 12
  - Airi Suzuki, Japanese singer
  - Sehun, Korean singer, rapper and actor (EXO)
- April 18 – Aminé, American rapper, singer and songwriter
- April 24 – Jordan Fisher, American singer, dancer and actor
- April 25
  - Sam Fender, English actor, singer-songwriter, musician and activist
  - Maggie Rogers, American singer-songwriter and record producer
- April 26 - Michael Pollack, American songwriter, singer, multi-instrumentalist, and record producer
- May 1 - Kacy Hill, American singer-songwriter, producer and former model
- May 5 – Celeste, American-born British singer
- May 7 - Laurel (musician). British musician
- May 17 – Julie Anne San Jose, Filipina actress, singer, television personality
- May 24 – Dimash Kudaibergen, Kazakh singer, songwriter, and multi-instrumentalist
- May 25 -
  - Royal & the Serpent, American singer and songwriter
  - Nathan Dawe, English DJ and producer (Annie-Marie, Little Mix, Ella Henderson)
- May 28 – Alec Benjamin, American musician
- May 30 - Madeon, French musician, DJ, songwriter, singer and music producer
- May 31 - Lil Aaron, American rapper, singer and songwriter
- June 4 – Olivia Somerlyn, known as LIVVIA, American pop singer-songwriter
- June 14 – Scarlxrd, British rapper and songwriter
- June 18 – Takeoff, American rapper (Migos) (d. 2022)
- June 22 - Louta (musician), Argentine performing musician, producer, songwriter, and disc-jockey
- June 25 - Egor Kreed, Russian rapper
- June 27 - Malinda Kathleen Reese, American stage actress, multi-instrumentalist, and singer-songwriter, comedian, YouTuber, and activist
- July 4
  - Era Istrefi, Kosovar singer
  - Amaarae, Ghanaian-American pop, afrobeat, alte, R&B singer
- July 5 – Sơn Tùng M-TP, Vietnamese singer-songwriter
- July 7
  - Ashton Irwin, Australian drummer and singer-songwriter (5 Seconds of Summer)
- July 9 - SG Lewis, English singer-songwriter, musician and record producer (Tove Lo)
- July 10 – Angel Haze, American rapper and singer
- July 11 – Nina Nesbitt, Scottish singer-songwriter, model, and musician
- July 14 - Bibi Bourelly, German-American singer-songwriter
- July 17 – Kali Uchis, Colombian-American singer-songwriter, record producer, music video director, and fashion designer
- July 31 – Lil Uzi Vert, American rapper, singer, songwriter
- August 2 – Jacob Collier, British musician, singer-songwriter, composer, music producer, and multi-instrumentalist
- August 5 – Donnie, Dutch rapper, singer and songwriter
- August 8 – Lauv (Ari Leff), American singer-songwriter and record producer
- August 9 – King Von, American rapper (d. 2020)
- August 11 – Alejandro Aranda, American singer
- August 16 – Áine Cahill, Irish singer-songwriter
- August 17 – Phoebe Bridgers, American indie rock singer-songwriter, musician and artist
- August 18 – Bobby Andonov, Australian singer-songwriter and actor
- August 22 – Jimilian, Danish singer
- August 28 – Felix Jaehn, German/Dutch DJ and record producer
- August 29 - Courtney Stodden, American media personality, model and singer
- August 30 – Kwon So-hyun, South Korean actress and singer
- August 31 - MoStack British Rapper and Singer (worked with: Anne-Marie)
- September 1 – Bianca Ryan, American singer
- September 12 – RM, South Korean rapper, songwriter and record producer, member of BTS
- September 17
  - Taylor Ware, American singer and yodeler
  - Chen Yihan, Chinese pianist and composer
- September 22
  - Emily Burns, English musician and singer-songwriter
  - G Flip, Australian singer-songwriter, producer, musician, drummer and activist
- September 23 – Zolita, American singer-songwriter, director, photographer and activist
- September 28 – Trevor Daniel, American singer-songwriter
- September 29 – Halsey, American singer-songwriter, artist and activist
- October 1 – Alfredo Olivas, Mexican singer
- October 2 – Shekhinah, South African singer-songwriter
- October 4 – Sarah Aarons, Australian singer, songwriter, musician
- October 15 – Sebastián Yatra, Colombian singer
- October 24 – Krystal Jung, American-South Korean singer (member of Boygenius)
- October 15 – Lil' Kleine, Dutch musician
- October 30 - Maro (Portuguese singer), Portuguese singer and songwriter
- November 3 – Ella Mai, English singer and songwriter
- November 4 – keshi, American singer
- November 6 – Speaker Knockerz, American rapper and record producer (d. 2014)
- November 7
  - Haruna Iikubo, Japanese actress and singer (Morning Musume)
  - Shamir, American singer and songwriter
- November 8 – Lauren Alaina, American country music singer, songwriter and actress
- November 9 – MNEK, British singer-songwriter and record producer
- November 24 – Reece Mastin, winner of The X Factor (Australia), rock-soul-blues singer-songwriter, and musician (English born, Australian)
- November 26 – Emma Portner, American dancer and choreographer
- November 28 – Bonnie Anderson, Australian singer-songwriter
- December 2 – Laura Les, American music producer and singer-songwriter (100 gecs)
- December 13 – Ibeyi (Lisa-Kaindé Diaz and Naomi Diaz), twin French singer-songwriters
- December 17 - Nat Wolf, American actor, musician and singer-songwriter
- December 18 – Slowthai, British rapper
- December 19
  - Michele Bravi, Italian singer
  - Nathan Evans, Scottish musician
- December 21 – Thelma Plum, Aboriginal Australian singer, songwriter, guitarist and musician
- unknown date – Ny Oh, British-born New Zealand folk singer, songwriter, and multi-instrumentalist

== Deaths ==
- January 4 – R. D. Burman, music director, 54
- January 6 – Harold Sumberg, violinist, 88
- January 15
  - Harry Nilsson, singer, songwriter, 52 (heart attack)
  - Georges Cziffra, pianist, 72
- January 22 – Rhett Forrester, American singer-songwriter, 37 (shot)
- January 25 – Bertha Rawlinson, New Zealand opera singer, composer and music teacher, 83
- January 30 – Rudolf Schwarz, conductor, 88
- February 5 – Tiana Lemnitz, operatic soprano, 96
- February 7 – Witold Lutosławski, composer, 81
- February 8 – Raymond Scott, composer and bandleader, 85
- February 19 – Micho Russell, Irish tin whistle player and collector of traditional music and folklore, 79
- February 22 – Papa John Creach, blues violinist, 76
- February 24
  - Jean Sablon, French singer, 87
  - Dinah Shore, singer, actress, 77
- March 3 – Karel Kryl, Czech folk singer, 49
- March 6 – Yvonne Fair, African-American singer, 51
- March 13 – Danny Barker, jazz musician and composer, 85
- March 16 – Nicolas Flagello, composer, 66
- March 18 – Ephraim Lewis, soul and R&B singer, 26
- March 22 – Dan Hartman, singer, 42 (brain tumour)
- March 23 – Donald Swann, pianist, composer and entertainer (Flanders and Swann), 70
- April 5
  - Rowland Greenberg, Norwegian jazz trumpeter, 73
  - Kurt Cobain, singer & guitarist (Nirvana), 27 (self-inflicted shotgun wound)
- April 7 – Lee Brilleaux, British R&B singer (Dr. Feelgood), 41 (cancer)
- April 19 – Larry Davis, blues singer and guitarist, 57
- May 23 – Joe Pass, jazz guitarist, 65 (liver cancer)
- May 25 – Eric Gale, jazz guitarist, 55 (lung cancer)
- May 26 – Sonny Sharrock, jazz guitarist, 53
- May 27 – Red Rodney, bop trumpeter, 66
- May 29 – Oliver Jackson, jazz drummer, 61
- May 31
  - Uzay Heparı, Turkish composer, music producer, songwriter and actor, 24 (motorcycle accident)
  - Herva Nelli, operatic soprano, 85
- June 4
  - Derek Leckenby, guitarist (Herman's Hermits), 51
  - Earle Warren, saxophonist, 79
- June 11 – Robert Beadell, composer, 68
- June 14 – Henry Mancini, composer, 70
- June 15 – Manos Hadjidakis, composer, 68
- June 16 – Kristen Pfaff, bass guitarist (Hole), 27 (heroin overdose)
- June 25
  - Kin Vassy, songwriter, performer, co-lead singer and guitarist of The First Edition 1969–72 (lung cancer), 50
  - DJ Train, producer (smoke inhalation)
- June 29 – Kurt Eichhorn, conductor, 85
- July 2 – Marion Williams, gospel singer, 66
- July 31 – Anne Shelton, British singer, 70
- August 6 – Domenico Modugno, Italian singer and songwriter, 66
- September 2 – Roy Castle, musician and all-round entertainer, 62 (lung cancer)
- September 3 – Major Lance, R&B singer, 55
- September 6
  - Nicky Hopkins, session musician, keyboardist, 50 (complications from intestinal surgery)
  - Max Kaminsky, jazz trumpeter and bandleader, 85
- September 7 – Eric Crozier, librettist, 79
- September 13 – John Stevens, jazz musician
- September 20 – Jule Styne, songwriter, 88
- September 24 – Urmas Alender, singer, 40 (drowned in MS Estonia sinking)
- September 29 – Cheb Hasni, Algerian Raj musician, 26 (murdered)
- October 4 – Danny Gatton, guitarist, 49
- October 19 – Martha Raye, singer and comedian, 88
- October 22
  - Jimmy Miller, record producer, 52
  - Shlomo Carlebach, Jewish songwriter
- October 26 – Wilbert Harrison, R&B singer, pianist, guitarist and harmonica player, 65
- October 27 – Robert White, Motown session guitarist, 57
- October 31
  - Lester Sill, record executive, 76
  - Erling Stordahl, Norwegian singer, 71
- November 4 – Fred "Sonic" Smith, MC5 guitarist, 46 (heart attack)
- November 7 – Shorty Rogers, jazz trumpeter, 70
- November 11 – Elizabeth Maconchy, composer, 87
- November 18 – Cab Calloway, jazz and scat singer, 86
- November 21 – Juancho Rois, Colombian vallenato musician, accordionist, and composer, 35 (plane crash)
- November 28 – Vic Legley, Belgian violist and composer of French birth, 79
- December 8 – Antônio Carlos Jobim, bossa nova composer and songwriter, 67
- December 10 – Garnett Silk, reggae singer, 28 (house fire)
- December 23 - Dan Hamilton, singer (Hamilton, Joe Frank & Reynolds), 48

== Awards ==
- The following artists are inducted into the Rock and Roll Hall of Fame: John Lennon, Elton John, Grateful Dead, The Band, Bob Marley, Duane Eddy, Rod Stewart, and The Animals
- Inductees of the GMA Gospel Music Hall of Fame include Tennessee Ernie Ford

=== Filmfare Awards ===
- Kumar Sanu – Filmfare Best Male Playback Award
- Filmfare Best Music Director Awards – Rahul Dev Burman

=== Grammy Awards ===
- 36th Annual Grammy Awards

=== Country Music Association Awards ===
- 1994 Country Music Association Awards

=== Eurovision Song Contest ===
- Eurovision Song Contest 1994

=== Mercury Music Prize ===
- Elegant Slumming – M People wins.

=== Juno Award ===
- Rascalz – Juno Award Best rap album

== Charts ==
- List of Billboard Hot 100 number ones of 1994
- 1994 in British music#Charts
- List of Oricon number-one singles of 1994

=== KROQ ===
- KROQ Top 106.7 Countdown of 1994

=== Triple J Hottest 100 ===
- Triple J Hottest 100, 1994

== See also ==
- 1994 in British music
- Record labels established in 1994
