= World of Magic =

Single by Pharao

from the album Pharao
- B-side: "Remix"
- Released: 1995
- Genre: Eurodance; trance
- Length: 3:59
- Label: Dance Pool
- Songwriters: Stevie Steve; Alexander Hawking; Marcus Deon Thomas; Tomcat; Kyra
- Producers: Stevie Steve; Alexander Hawking

Pharao singles chronology
"There Is a Star" (1994)	"World of Magic" (1995)	"Temple of Love" (1997)

Music video
- "World of Magic" on YouTube

"World of Magic" is a song recorded by German Eurodance act Pharao, which consists of Indian/German singer Kyra Pharao and American rapper Deon Blue. It was released in 1995, by label Dance Pool, as the third single from their debut album, Pharao (1994). The song became a top-20 hit in Finland, peaking at number 13. Additionally, it reached the top 30 in both Sweden and Germany. On the Eurochart Hot 100, "World of Magic" peaked at number 97 in April 1995.

== Music video ==
The accompanying music video for "World of Magic" was directed by John Clayton. He had previously directed the video for the act's first single, "I Show You Secrets". "World of Magic" was filmed on a beach and in a warehouse located south of London, the UK. It was B-listed on German music television channel VIVA in May 1995 and MTV Europe put it on prime break out rotation same month.

== Track listing ==
- CD maxi
1. "World of Magic" (Magic Radio/Video Mix) – 3:59
2. "World of Magic" (Land Of Unity Mix) – 5:38
3. "World of Magic" (Wizard Mix) – 5:53
4. "World of Magic" (Witchcraft Rave Mix) – 5:52
- CD maxi - Remixes
1. "World of Magic" (Dance Radio Version) – 3:44
2. "World of Magic" (Summer Radio) – 3:56
3. "World of Magic" (Radio Version) – 3:43
4. "World of Magic" (Unicorn Radio Mix) – 3:36
5. "World of Magic" (Trip To Wonderland) – 5:29
6. "World of Magic" (Magical Summer) – 5:40
7. "World of Magic" (Fantasy Mix) – 5:13
8. "World of Magic" (Unicorn Mix) – 5:23

== Charts ==
Chart (1995)	Peak position
Europe (Eurochart Hot 100)	97
Europe (European Dance Radio)	17
Finland (IFPI)	13
Germany (GfK)	28
Sweden (Sverigetopplistan)	22
