= Sedes =

Sedes is Latin for seat.

Sedes may also refer to:

- a bishop's episcopal throne, also known as a cathedra
- SEDES, one of the oldest civic associations and think tanks of Portugal
- Sedes (band), a Polish punk rock band
- an administrative unit in the Kingdom of Hungary, also known as Seat (administrative division)
- Sedes Air Base, a Greek military air base
- Sedevacantists, those who believe that the See of Rome is vacant
