= The Return (Pharao album) =

Studio album by Pharao
- Released: 1998
- Genre: Eurodance

Pharao chronology
Pharao (1994)	The Return (1998)

The Return is a 1998 Eurodance album by German eurodance act Pharao.

== Track listing ==
#	Title	Length
1.	Intro	2:33
2.	Wish I Could Fly	5:55
3.	Bellydancer	2:13
4.	Temple Of Love	4:45
5.	I Can't Wait	5:35
6.	It's A Wonder	4:56
7.	Rainmaker	4:59
8.	You Are My Man	4:01
9.	Valley Of Kings	1:19
10.	Once Upon A Time	4:10
11.	Love Is A Miracle	4:31
12.	Pick Me Up	4:46
13.	Back Home Again	4:04
14.	Silence Is Golden	4:31
15.	Dreams On Golden Wings	4:29
16.	Outro	1:57
