= Hard Works =

Compilation album by Phil Beer

Compilation album by Phil Beer
- Released: 20 November 2000 (First cover); 15 December 2008 (Second cover)
- Recorded: 1994–1998 (or 1989–1994)
- Genre: Folk music
- Length: 89:53
- Label: Talking Elephant

Phil Beer chronology
Rhythm Methodist (2005)	Hard Works (2000)	Box Set One (2010)

Hard Works is a compilation album by Phil Beer released 20 November 2000 and again on 15 December 2008 with a different cover, the album aims at collecting all the tracks from Hard Hats and The Works.

Released on Beer's Talking Elephant label, they said of the album "This double CD release features the two albums “Hard Hats” from 1994 and “The Works” from 1989. This was during the time when Phil was touring with The Rolling Stones and near the beginnings of Show of Hands. Thus this was a great time for Phil and the music reflects this. It reflects the work of a truly talented multi-instrumentalist in depth and gravity and also highlights the more quirky, light nature of his music.". This confused many people, The Works was believed to be released in 1998, but they confused people it was released in 1989.

== Track listing ==
=== Disc one: Hard Hats ===
1. Fireman's Song
2. Blind Fiddler
3. Chance
4. This Year
5. This Far
6. Hard Hats
7. Blinded By Love
8. She Could Laugh
9. More
10. Think It Over
11. Fireman's Song (Acoustic) (Bonus track)

=== Disc two: The Works ===
1. General Ward / Tobins / The Starling
2. Swannee River
3. Staten Island / Soldier's Joy
4. Haste To The Wedding / Mohawk / The Cap Sizun
5. Thomas Morris / Chasing The Jack
6. Michael Turner's Waltz
7. Gypsy Moth
8. Jig / Banish Misfortune
9. Lost In Space / Altan / Teetotalers
10. Flash Company
11. Jenny On The Shore / The Bull
12. Rocky Road To Mylor
