= The Works (Phil Beer album) =

Studio album by Phil Beer
- Released: 1996 / 7 September 1998 (See Release date section)
- Recorded: 1998 or 1989
- Genre: Folk music; instrumental
- Label: HTD

Phil Beer chronology
Hard Hats (1994)	The Works (1996)	Ridgeriders (1999)

The Works was Phil Beer's third studio album, believed to have been released in 1998 (though some sources suggest earlier copies may have been released in 1996) by HTD, who also released his previous album Hard Hats. It features instrumentals.

== Release date ==
The entire album was re-released as CD2 of Hard Works in 2008. This compilation stated the album was from 1989 when he was touring with The Rolling Stones in the Steel Wheels era. This was confusing as the album seems to be released on 7 September 1998, and sources such as Allmusic even state so. It is possible that the 1998 release date marks a re-issue. Some sources suggest a release of the album occurred in 1996, this seems to lean more credence to the notion that the 1998 release date marks a re-issue.

== Reception ==
Professional ratings
Review scores
Source	Rating
The Living Tradition	(favourable)

The Living Tradition said The Works was a "good showcase" for Beer's talents: "Phil is not an acoustic fiddle player as everything is pre-amped to get the sound he wants. In fact he has recorded this himself. There's a good mix of tunes, some traditional, some written by Phil himself, going back some twenty years."

== Track listing ==
1. "General Ward"
2. "Tobins"
3. "Starling"
4. "Swanne River"
5. "Staten Island"
6. "Soldiers Joy"
7. "Haste to the Wedding"
8. "Mohawk"
9. "Cap Sizun"
10. "Thomas"
11. "Morris"
12. "Chasing the Jack"
13. "Michael Turner's Waltz"
14. "Gypsy Mouth"
15. "Jig"
16. "Banish Misfortune"
17. "Lost in Space"
18. "Altan"
19. "Teetotallers"
20. "Flash Company"
21. "Jenny on the Shore"
22. "Bull"
23. "Rocky Road Mylor"

=== Hard Works version ===
In Hard Works, the album remains intact but every two separate tracks from the original appears as one track on Hard Works, three tracks of Hard Works even contains what was three separate tracks in The Works. This totals 10 tracks.

1. "General Ward / Tobins / The Starling"
2. "Swannee River / Staten Island / Soldier's Joy"
3. "Haste to the Wedding / The Mohawk / The Cap Sieun"
4. "Thomas Morris / Chasing the Jack"
5. "Michael Turner's Waltz"
6. "Gypsy Moth / Jig / Banish Misfortune"
7. "Lost in Space / Altan / Teetotalers"
8. "Flash Company"
9. "Jenny on the Shore / The Bull"
10. "Rocky Road to Mylor"
