= Simple E =

American former R&B and hip hop pop singer-songwriter

Erica Williams, better known as Simple E, is an American former R&B and hip hop pop singer-songwriter, whose debut 1994 single "Play My Funk", made the US Billboard R&B chart, and appeared on the Sugar Hill soundtrack.

Simple E was signed to Fox Records, who then released her only album, Colouz Uv Sound on October 11, 1994. Two singles were released, "Blue Jeans" and "Play My Funk", which reached 72 on the Billboard Hot 100. Simple E appeared on Cherokee's 1999 album, I Love You...Me.

== Discography ==
| Year | Title | Chart positions |
| Year | Title | U.S. R&B |
|---|---|---|
| 1994 | Colouz Uv Sound: Released: October 11, 1994; Label: Fox | 88 |
