= Pharao =

German Eurodance band

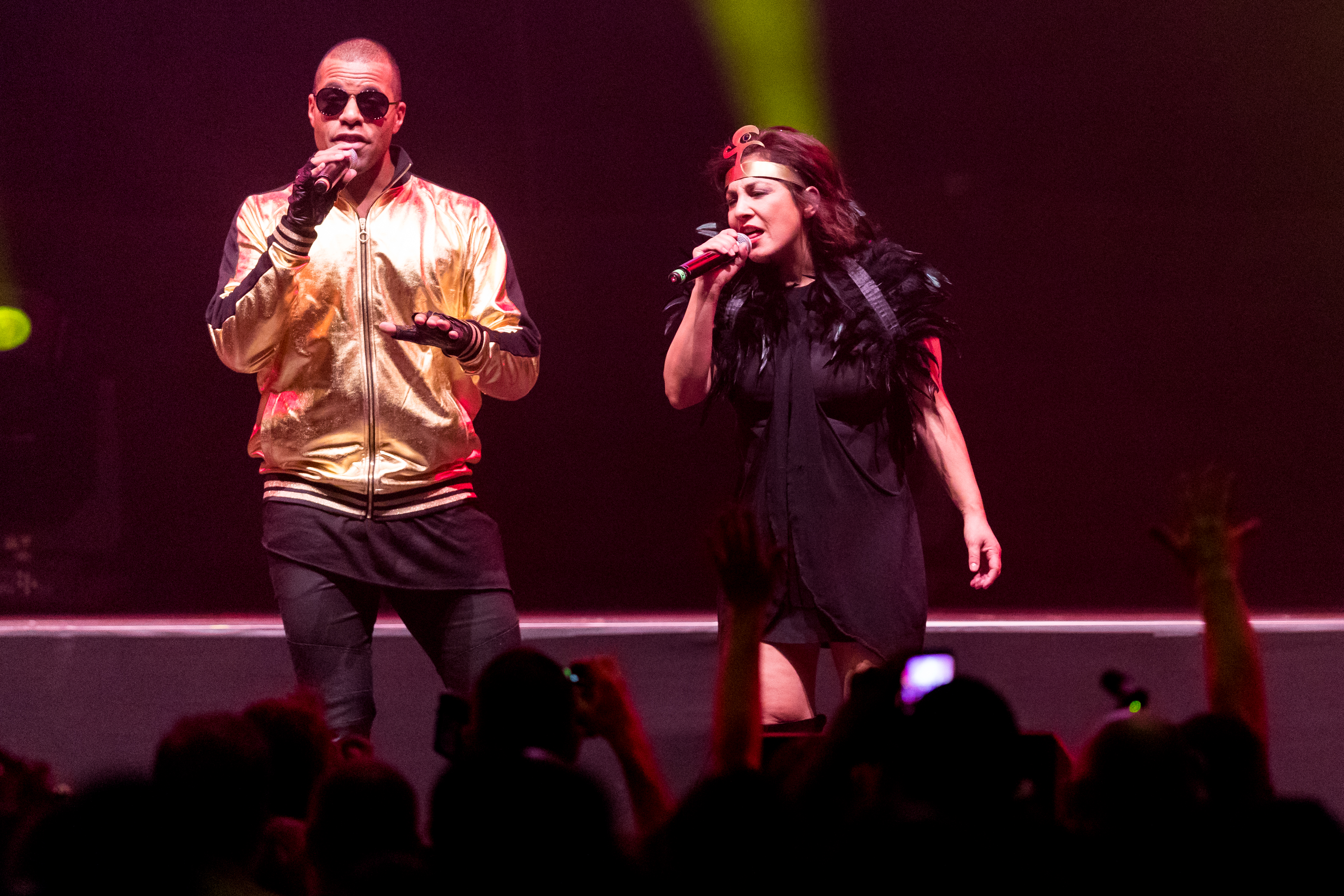
- Pharao; Kyra Pharao and Siam (2017)

Background information
- Origin: Munich, Germany
- Genres: Eurodance; Trance
- Years active: 1994–2001, 2014–present
- Label: Dance Pool
- Members: Kyra Pharao; Siam (Nik Felice); DJ Hi-NRG
- Past members: Deon Blue; Prince Damien

Pharao is a German Eurodance act produced by Alexander Hawking and DJ Stevie Steve. The band was fronted by Egyptian-Indian singer Kyra Pharao (Claudia Banerjee) (born 17 January 1971) and American rapper Deon Blue (born 20 January 1970). Pharao released two studio albums, Pharao (1994) and The Return (1998).

== Musical career ==
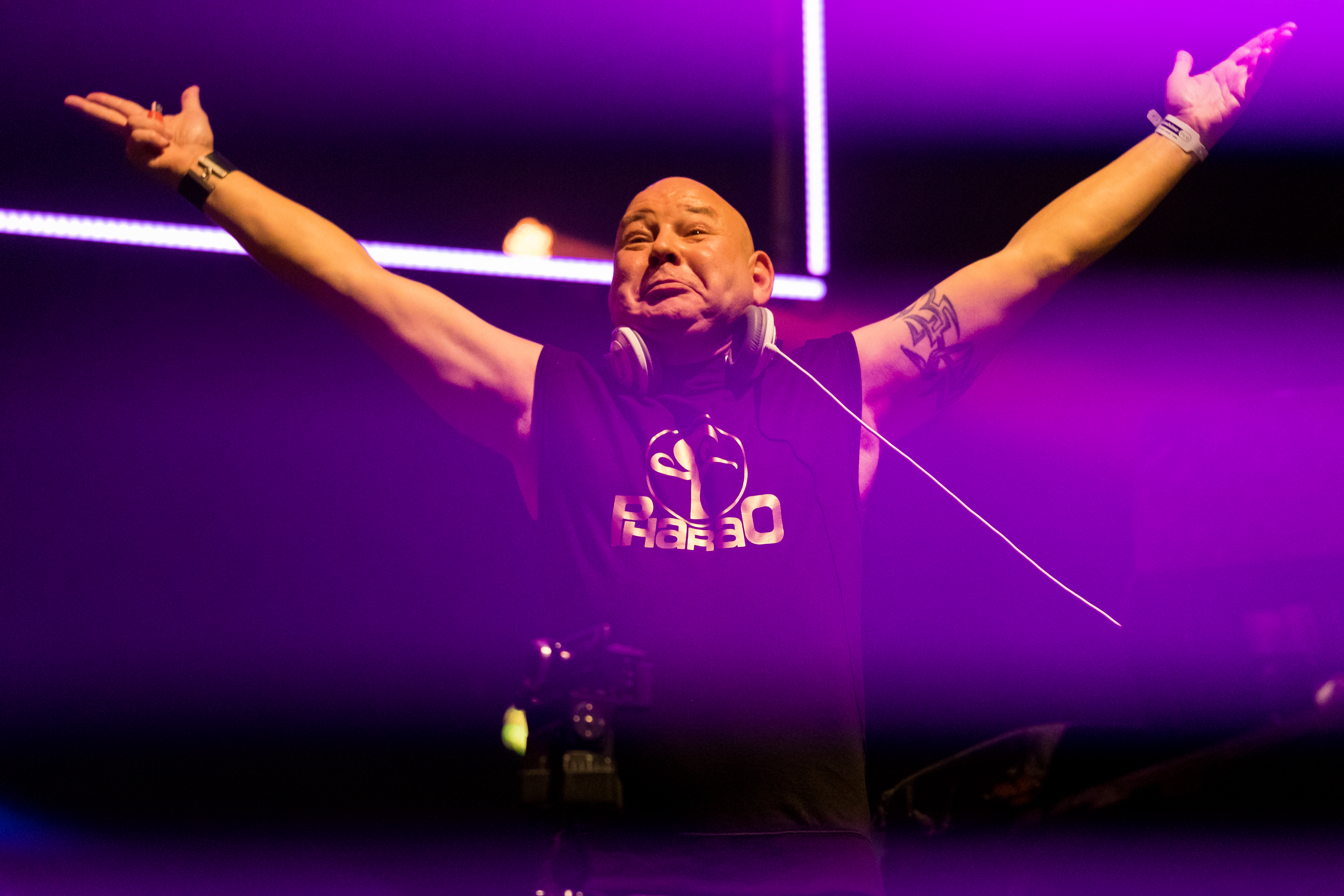
DJ Hi-NRG (2017)

Their debut single "I Show You Secrets" reached No. 6 on the German single Media Control Charts within weeks of its release, eventually earning them a gold disc. The single also charted in other European countries, including Switzerland and Austria. Their second single "There Is a Star" was another hit, reaching No. 8 in the German official singles chart, which earned them another gold disc. "There Is a Star" was also successful in countries such as Switzerland and Sweden, and peaked at No. 43 in the UK Singles Chart. Their debut album, Pharao, reached No. 23 on the German album chart. Their third single "World of Magic" was not quite as successful as the first two singles; however, it entered the Top 30 in both Germany and Sweden.

In 1997, after almost two years of silence, they released their second album, albeit without Deon Blue, who had left the band by then.

The first single, "Temple of Love", from that album peaked at No. 36 on the German singles chart, and reached No. 7 on the Finnish singles chart, among others. Their follow-up single, "Once Upon a Time", did not chart in Germany. Pharao's second album, The Return, was released in early 1998, but despite the band's efforts, it did not achieve the chart success of their previous album.

According to their former management agency, Pharao disbanded in 2001.

However, in 2014, Kyra Pharao returned to front the group and tour with all of their old songs, alongside Prince Damien, who was chosen as the new rapper of Pharao.

In 2015, a compilation album was released under the name "Best Of 1994 - 1998", featuring all songs digitally remastered. It was not released under a record label, so the album is only available at special events and live concerts of the band.

In early 2016, Prince Damien left the group and was replaced by Siam. Prince Damien later embarked on a solo career and won season 13 of Deutschland sucht den Superstar.

== Discography ==
=== Albums ===
- 1994: Pharao
- 1998: The Return
- 2015: Best Of 1994 - 1998

=== Singles ===
Year	Single	Peak chart positions									Certifications (sales thresholds)	Album
Year	Single	AUT	CAN Dance	FIN	GER	NED	SUI	SWE	UK	U.S. Dance	Certifications (sales thresholds)	Album
1994	"I Show You Secrets"	5	10	3	6	—	6	14	85	35	GER: Gold	Pharao
1994	"There Is a Star"	16	7	3	8	43	12	14	43	—	GER: Gold	Pharao
1995	"World of Magic"	—	—	—	28	—	—	22	—	—		Pharao
1997	"Temple of Love"	—	—	7	36	—	—	—	—	—		The Return
1997	"Once Upon a Time"	—	—	—	—	—	—	—	—	—		The Return
"—" denotes releases that did not chart.
