= There Is a Star =

Single by Pharao

from the album Pharao
- B-side: "Remix"
- Released: September 1994
- Genre: Eurodance; trance
- Length: 3:54
- Label: Blow Up (Germany); Dance Pool
- Songwriters: Stevie Steve; Alexander Hawking; Marcus Deon Thomas
- Producers: Stevie Steve; Alexander Hawking

Pharao singles chronology
"I Show You Secrets" (1994)	"There Is a Star" (1994)	"World of Magic" (1995)

Music video
- "There Is a Star" on YouTube

"There Is a Star" is a song recorded by German Eurodance act Pharao, released in September 1994 by the labels Blow Up and Dance Pool as the second single from the act's debut album, Pharao (1994). It is written by producers Stevie Steve and Alexander Hawking with rapper of the act, Marcus Deon Thomas, and commercially the song was presented with the slogan, "Wise men follow stars...". It scored chart success in Finland and Germany, where it peaked at numbers three and eight, respectively. In Canada, the single reached number seven on the Canadian dance chart. The accompanying music video, featuring the act inside an electronic pyramid, was directed by Nigel Simpkiss and filmed in London.

== Chart performance ==
"There Is a Star" was a major hit on the charts in Europe and remains the act's most successful song, along with "I Show You Secrets". It was a top-10 hit in both Finland and Germany. In Finland, it jumped from number 17 to number 4 on 24 December 1994, and peaked at number three four weeks later, on 28 January 1995. It stayed for two weeks at that position and spent a total of 10 weeks within the top 10. In Germany, the single entered as number 30 in November, before dropping to 98 the following week. Then it jumped to its peak position as number eight on 5 December 1994 and spent 17 weeks inside the German Singles Chart.

Additionally, "There Is a Star" entered the top 20 in Austria (16), Sweden (14) and Switzerland (12), and the top 40 in the Netherlands (37) and Scotland (38). On the Eurochart Hot 100, it reached its highest position as number 21 in February 1995, in its eight week on the chart. It also reached number two on the European Dance Radio Chart, becoming the second most-played dance song on European radio stations that week. In the United Kingdom, it ended up at number 43 in its first week on the UK Singles Chart, on February 26, 1995. On the UK Dance Singles Chart, the song fared better, reaching number 30. On the UK Club Chart, it peaked at number 75. Outside Europe, "There Is a Star" peaked at number seven on the RPM Dance/Urban chart in Canada.

The song was awarded with a gold record in Germany, with a sale of 250,000 singles.

== Critical reception ==
In his review, Chuck Campbell from Knoxville News Sentinel felt the act "twirls gleefully through the springy grooves of rave-ish, techno-y modern dance music." James Hamilton from Music Week's RM Dance Update described the song as a "MTV plugged typical bland spacey Euro galloper" in his weekly dance column DJ directory. Johnny Cigarettes from NME viewed it as a "good, old-fashioned Europurp smesh heet. It has a squelchy beat that sounds like a Duracell rabbit punching the crap out of a leather sofa! A damsel-in-distress vocal". He added, "A pop tune that would cause Autechre's baldy purist heads to explode."

== Music video ==
The music video for "There Is a Star" was directed by Nigel Simpkiss and filmed in London, featuring the act performing the song inside what appears to be an electronic pyramid. In the video, singer Kyra Pharao, rapper Deon Thomas and dancers wears gold-coloured clothes. In the rap parts, Thomas performs bare-chested with a snake around his neck. Kyra, wearing her crown, performs on a divan or sitting in a Ball Chair. The white-colored interior inside the pyramid has a spaceship-like feel, with triangle-shaped doors automatically opening or closing, technical equipments and astronauts. The video was A-listed on German music television channel VIVA and received "prime break out" rotation on MTV Europe in December 1994.

== Track listings ==
- 12 single, Germany
1. "There Is a Star" (No. 1 Space Hymn Track) – 6:23
2. "There Is a Star" (Videostar Mix) – 3:54
3. "There Is a Star" (X-Tra Terrestrial Housemix) – 5:07
4. "There Is a Star" (Universe Of Trance) – 5:39
- CD single, 12" maxi - Remixes
1. "There Is a Star" (Interplanetary Fun Mix) – 6:26
2. "There Is a Star" (Galactic Space Race) – 5:59
3. "There Is a Star" (Supernova Mix) – 7:01
- CD maxi, Europe
1. "There Is a Star" (Radiostar Videomix) – 3:54
2. "There Is a Star" (No.1 Space Hymn Track) – 6:23
3. "There Is a Star" (X-Tra Terrestrial Housemix) – 5:07
4. "There Is a Star" (Universe Of Trance) – 5:39

== Charts ==
=== Weekly charts ===
Chart (1994–1995)	Peak position
Austria (Ö3 Austria Top 40)	16
Canada Dance/Urban (RPM)	7
Europe (Eurochart Hot 100)	21
Europe (European Dance Radio)	2
Finland (Suomen virallinen lista)	3
Germany (GfK)	8
Netherlands (Dutch Top 40)	37
Netherlands (Single Top 100)	43
Scotland (OCC)	38
Sweden (Sverigetopplistan)	14
Switzerland (Schweizer Hitparade)	12
UK Singles (OCC)	43
UK Dance (OCC)	30
UK Club Chart (Music Week)	75
UK Pop Tip Club Chart (Music Week)	21

=== Year-end charts ===
Chart (1995)	Position
Netherlands (Dutch Top 40)	314

== Certifications ==
Region	Certification	Certified units/sales
Germany (BVMI)	Gold	250,000^{^}
^{^} Shipments figures based on certification alone.
