= Pharao (album) =

Studio album by Pharao
- Released: November 22, 1994
- Genre: Eurodance

Pharao chronology
Pharao (1994)	The Return (1998)

Professional ratings
Review scores
Source	Rating
Knoxville News Sentinel	3/5 stars

Pharao is the first album of German band Pharao, released on November 22, 1994.

== Track listing ==
1. There Is a Star 3:55
2. King Pharao 3:28
3. I Show You Secrets 4:02
4. World Of Magic 4:10
5. Dance Of The Snake 4:24
6. Eternity 4:50
7. Gold In The Pyramid 4:37
8. Beautiful Flower Of The Bad 1:37
9. We Got The Key 4:43
10. It's Your Way 3:54
11. Rave Like An Egyptian 6:27
12. Christmasland 4:18
13. I Show You Secrets (Unplugged Version) 3:49

== Sales and certifications ==
Certifications for Pharao
Region	Certification	Certified units/sales
Finland (Musiikkituottajat)	Gold	29,492
