= 1994 in South Korean music =

The following is a list of notable events and releases that happened in 1994 in music in South Korea.

== Debuting and disbanded ==
=== Debuting groups ===
- Cool
- Roo'ra
- Toy
- Two Two

=== Soloists ===
- Kim Jin-woo
- J.Y. Park
- Yoon Do-hyun

== Releases in 1994 ==
=== January ===
Date	Title	Artist	Genre(s)

=== February ===
Date	Title	Artist	Genre(s)

=== March ===
Date	Title	Artist	Genre(s)
1	Easy Rock Single 1	Major	Folk rock
9	Kim Jin Woo Vol. 1	Kim Jin Woo	Hip hop

=== April ===
Date	Title	Artist	Genre(s)

=== May ===
Date	Title	Artist	Genre(s)
1	The Return of N.EX.T PART I: The Being	N.EX.T	Heavy metal
2	Two Two	Two Two	K-pop

=== June ===
Date	Title	Artist	Genre(s)
25	Kim Kwang-Seok Fourth	Kim Kwang-seok	Folk rock

=== July ===
Date	Title	Artist	Genre(s)
1	The Reason I Wanted You (너이길 원했던 이유)	Cool	K-pop
—N/a	Guitar And Dance Single 1	J&J	K-pop

=== August ===
Date	Title	Artist	Genre(s)
13	Seo Taiji and Boys III	Seo Taiji and Boys	K-pop

=== September ===
Date	Title	Artist	Genre(s)
1	Blue City	J.Y. Park	K-pop
9	Rhythm Light Beat Black	Deux	Hip hop
15	After A Long Time (그후로 오랫동안)	Shin Seung-hun	
24	The Secret of Color	Lee Seung-chul	Soft rock, Ballad

=== October ===
Date	Title	Artist	Genre(s)
1	Inside My Heart	Toy	Electronica

=== November ===
Date	Title	Artist	Genre(s)
1	Sorrow of Superman (슈퍼맨의 비애)	DJ DOC	Hip hop
1	Again	Sobangcha	Dance pop, Ballad

=== December ===
Date	Title	Artist	Genre(s)
—N/a	In Front of the Post Office in Autumn	Yoon Do-hyun	Folk
