= Colouz Uv Sound =

Studio album by Simple E
- Released: October 11, 1994
- Recorded: 1993–1994
- Genres: R&B, hip hop
- Label: Fox
- Producers: D'wayne Wiggins, Ali Shaheed Muhammad, Mista Lawnge, Terry T

Colouz Uv Sound is the only album by Simple E, released on October 11, 1994, through Fox Records.

The album was mainly produced by Tony! Toni! Toné! member D'wayne Wiggins, but Ali Shaheed Muhammad of A Tribe Called Quest and Mista Lawnge of Black Sheep also produced a song each on the album. Colouz Uv Sound spawned a semi-successful single entitled "Play My Funk", which was her only entry on the Billboard Hot 100 where it peaked at 72. The album itself only reached No. 88 on the Billboard R&B chart. She was soon released from the label due to the poor record sales.

== Track listing ==
1. "Kum Follow Me"- 4:44
2. "Day Ain't Readē"- 4:57
3. "dē Abyss"- 5:22
4. "East Coast / West Coast"- 5:41 (featuring Spice 1)
5. "Rant & Rave"- 4:39
6. "Soul Serchin'"- 2:00
7. "Kinkē Reggae"- 4:10
8. "Neck Work"- 4:10
9. "Paradigmz"- 4:49
10. "Blue Jeans"- 5:37
11. "An Innocent Rage"- 4:25
12. "Realitē"- 3:57
13. "Play My Funk"- 5:21

== Charts ==
Chart (1994)	Peak position
Billboard Top R&B/Hip-Hop Albums	88
