= Drop Dead Beautiful (song) =

1994 single by Six Was Nine

Single by Six Was Nine

from the album Let It Come Your Way
- B-side: "Leaving on the Last Train" (rehearsal tape)
- Released: March 1994
- Studio: Chipping Norton (Oxfordshire, England); London, England
- Length: 4:53 (album version); 3:59 (radio version)
- Label: Virgin
- Songwriters: Mick Leeson; Peter Vale
- Producer: Mike Vernon

Six Was Nine singles chronology
"Drop Dead Beautiful" (1994)	"Surprise, Surprise" (1994)

"Drop Dead Beautiful" is a song by German soul-pop duo Six Was Nine, included as the opening track on their second studio album, Let It Come Your Way (1994). Written by Mick Leeson and Peter Vale and produced by Mike Vernon, the song was released as the album's lead single in March 1994. Although the song stalled at number 51 on the German Singles Chart, it became a top-10 hit in Denmark and Iceland and reached number one in South Africa.

== Background and release ==
Six Was Nine released their debut album, A Few Bold Strokes of the Brush, in 1992, wanting to make it sound like a Londonbeat record. Afterwards, following the advice of Arista Records president Clive Davis, the duo decided to give their sophomore album, Let It Come Your Way, a live soul sound, using American jazz singer Curtis Stigers as an inspiration. For "Drop Dead Beautiful", the duo and their manager, Bernd Hoffmann, sought out the songwriters of Charles & Eddie's international hit "Would I Lie to You?": Mick Leeson and Peter Vale, to make a "quality" track, which German music had not been known for at the time. English record producer Mike Vernon produced the entire album.

Virgin Records released "Drop Dead Beautiful" in Germany in March 1994. The CD single issued in Europe contains the radio version of the track plus a rehearsal demo of "Leaving on the Last Train". A 12-inch single was also distributed in Germany containing the club mix plus two additional remixes of "Drop Dead Beautiful". In the United Kingdom, a CD and cassette single were released on 1 August 1994; the CD format contains the radio, club, and album versions of the track as well as the "Bul Bul" mix.

== Critical reception ==
Reviewing Let It Come Your Way, Music & Media magazine called "Drop Dead Beautiful" "bluesy" with a "subtle drive".

== Chart performance ==
On 23 May 1994, "Drop Dead Beautiful" debuted at number 61 on the German Singles Chart. Over the next six weeks, the song rose and fell within the top 75, and during its seventh week on the chart (11 July), it peaked at number 51. The song remained on the German chart for a further 15 weeks, staying in the top 100 for 23 weeks in total. Despite its low peak, it ended the year at number 96 on the German year-end chart due to its longevity. In June, the song entered the top 10 of the Danish Singles Chart, rising to a peak of number five the following month.

"Drop Dead Beautiful" also became a top-10 hit in Iceland. On 7 July 1994, the single debuted at number 23 on the Íslenski Listinn Topp 40. After rising to number eight the following week, the single peaked at number three during its third week in. It remained on the Icelandic chart for 11 weeks and ended the year as Iceland's 14th-most-successful single. Elsewhere in Europe, the song charted in Sweden, where it spent two nonconsecutive weeks on the Topplistan chart, peaking at number 36 during its second appearance in August 1994. On the Eurochart Hot 100, "Drop Dead Beautiful" reached number 92 on 13 August 1994. Outside Europe, the track became a number-one hit in South Africa, and the song's music video received substantial airplay on Asian music television network Channel [V].

== Track listings ==
- European CD single
1. "Drop Dead Beautiful" (radio version) – 3:59
2. "Leaving on the Last Train" (rehearsal tape) – 3:37
- German 12-inch single

A1. "Drop Dead Beautiful" (club mix) – 4:57
A2. "Drop Dead Beautiful" (Bul Bul mix) – 5:17
B1. "Drop Dead Beautiful" (Ultraworld mix) – 5:09

- UK CD single
1. "Drop Dead Beautiful" (radio version) – 3:59
2. "Drop Dead Beautiful" (club mix) – 4:57
3. "Drop Dead Beautiful" (Bul Bul mix) – 5:17
4. "Drop Dead Beautiful" (album version) – 4:53

== Credits and personnel ==
Credits are taken from the Let It Come Your Way liner notes.

Studios

- Recorded at various studios in London, England, and Chipping Norton Recording Studios (Oxfordshire, England)
- Pre-produced at Bob Ross Studio (Portsmouth, England)
- Mixed at Britannia Row Studios (London, England)
- Mastered at Metropolis Studio (London, England)

Personnel

- Mick Leeson – music, lyrics
- Peter Vale – music, lyrics
- Achim Degen – vocals
- Mike Vernon – background vocals, tambourine production
- George Chandler – background vocals
- Katie Kissoon – background vocals
- Tessa Niles – background vocals
- Lisa Barron – background vocals
- Markus Tiedemann – guitars
- Andy Brown – bass guitar
- Harald Schneck – keyboards
- Bob Ross – additional keyboards, programmes, samples
- Bob Jenkins – drums
- Luís Jardim – percussion
- Rafe McKenna – mixing
- Matt White – mixing assistance
- Adi Winman – mixing assistance
- Terry Medhurst – engineering
- Jamie Lane – engineering
- Tim Young – mastering

== Charts ==
=== Weekly charts ===
Chart (1994)	Peak position
Denmark (IFPI)	5
Europe (Eurochart Hot 100)	92
Europe (European Hit Radio)	25
Iceland (Íslenski Listinn Topp 40)	3
Germany (GfK)	51
South Africa	1
Sweden (Sverigetopplistan)	36

=== Year-end charts ===
Chart (1994)	Position
Germany (Media Control)	96
Iceland (Íslenski Listinn Topp 40)	14

== Release history ==
Region	Date	Format(s)	Label(s)	Ref.
Germany	March 1994	12-inch vinyl; CD	Virgin	
United Kingdom	1 August 1994	CD; cassette	Virgin	
