= Anotha Level =

American hip hop group

- Origin: Los Angeles, California, U.S.
- Genres: West Coast hip hop
- Years active: 1994–1995
- Label: Priority
- Past members: Bambino; Ced Twice; Stenge; Stones; Stix (deceased)

Anotha Level was an American West Coast hip hop group composed of five members: Bambino, Ced Twice, Stenge, Stix and Stones.

== Discography ==
Studio albums

Year	Title	Chart positions	
Year	Title	U.S. R&B	U.S. Heatseekers
1994	On Anotha Level: Released: April 26, 1994; Label: Priority	60	17

Singles

- 1994 – "What's That Cha Say"
- 1994 – "Don't Stimulate"
