= On Anotha Level =

Studio album by Anotha Level
- Released: April 26, 1994
- Recorded: 1993–1994
- Studios: Echo Sound (Los Angeles, CA); Street Knowledge Recording Studio (Los Angeles, CA)
- Genre: West Coast hip hop
- Length: 50:59
- Label: Priority
- Producers: Ice Cube (exec.); Laylaw (also exec.); D-Maq; Stix (co.); Stones (co.)

Singles from On Anotha Level
- 1. "What's That Cha Say" Released: 1994; 2. "Don't Stimulate" Released: 1994

Professional ratings
Review scores
Source	Rating
AllMusic	3/5 stars

On Anotha Level is the only studio album by American West Coast hip hop group Anotha Level. It was released on April 26, 1994 through Priority Records.

== Background ==
Anotha Level was composed of five members: Bambino, Ced Twice, Stenge, Stix and Stones. The group was discovered by Ice Cube, who then got the group a deal with his label Priority Records. The album was executive produced by Ice Cube and Laylaw, with actual production handled by Laylaw, D-Maq and group members Stix and Stones. In addition, Ice Cube was featured on the track "Level-N-Service" and The Pharcyde was featured on "Phat-T".

Despite the involvement from Ice Cube, the album was not a commercial success. It peaked at No. 60 on the U.S. Billboard Top R&B/Hip-Hop Albums on May 28, 1994 and stayed on the chart for nine weeks. It also made it to No. 17 on the Heatseekers Albums chart. The group disbanded later in the year after making their final appearance on the Street Fighter 1994 soundtrack.

== Track listing ==
No.	Title	Length
1.	"Level Lounge"	1:24
2.	"Let Me Take Ya"	4:29
3.	"Just Feelin'"	4:30
4.	"Don't Stimulate"	4:01
5.	"Stimulating"	0:24
6.	"A Question to Ask"	3:36
7.	"Don't Fight It"	3:57
8.	"What's That Cha Say"	4:15
9.	"Swingaz"	1:03
10.	"Caught You Swingin'"	2:54
11.	"On Deck"	4:00
12.	"Level-N-Service" (featuring Ice Cube)	4:48
13.	"Fo Sho Shot"	3:44
14.	"Late"	2:55
15.	"Phat-T" (featuring The Pharcyde)	4:59
Total length:		50:59

Notes

- All songs written by Anotha Level, Lay Law & D-Maq except "Let Me Take Ya" written by Anotha Level, Lay Law, D-Maq & Don Jagwarr, and "Level-N-Service" written by Anotha Level, Lay Law, D-Maq, & Ice Cube.
- All lyrics rapped and written by Bambino, Ced Twice & Stenge

== Personnel ==
- Bambino – main artist, performer
- Ced Twice – main artist, performer
- Stenge – main artist, performer
- Stix – main artist, co-producer
- Stones – main artist, co-producer
- O'Shea Jackson – featured artist (track 12), executive producer
- The Pharcyde – featured artists (track 15)
- Larry Goodman – additional vocals (track 10), mixing, producer, executive producer
- Don Jagwarr – additional vocals (track 2)
- Angela Randle – additional vocals (track 10)
- Tino McIntosh – scratches
- Derrick McDowell – mixing, producer
- Michael Calderon – mixing, engineering
- Bob Moore – mixing, engineering
- Wally Traugott – mastering
- Art Shoji – art direction
- Sherry Etheredge – photography

== Charts ==
Chart (1994)	Peak position
US Top R&B/Hip-Hop Albums (Billboard)	60
US Heatseekers Albums (Billboard)	17
