= Dis Unu Fi Hear =

Studio album by Beenie Man
- Released: September 25, 1994
- Genres: Reggae, dancehall, ragga
- Label: Hightone

Beenie Man chronology
3 Against War (1994)	Dis Unu Fi Hear (1994)	Guns Out (1994)

Professional ratings
Review scores
Source	Rating
Allmusic	4/5 stars

Dis Unu Fi Hear is the fourth studio album by Beenie Man.

== Track listing ==
1. "Show Fi Flop" – 4:06
2. "If She Did Know" – 3:57
3. "Matey Nah Romp" – 3:55
4. "Baby Baby" (featuring Lukie D) – 3:57
5. "Seven Spanish Angels" – 4:07
6. "Make It Tan So Den" – 4:04
7. "Dis Unu Fi Hear" – 3:54
8. "The Big Man" – 3:59
9. "Nobody Is Perfect" (featuring Thriller U) – 4:08
10. "Nuff Things Fi Done" – 3:57
11. "Nuff Things Fi Done Remix" – 4:19
12. "Positive Vibration" – 4:28
