= Chen Yihan =

Chinese pianist and composer

Yihan Chen

Background information
- Born: 1994 (age 31–32); Changzhou, Jiangsu, China
- Genres: Classical
- Occupations: Composer, musician
- Website: www.yihanmusic.com

Yihan Chen (Chinese: 陳逸涵; pinyin: Chén Yìhán; born 1994) is a Chinese pianist and composer living in Plainfield, Indiana.

== Biography ==
He made his debut concert at Hilbert Circle Theater, Indianapolis, on February 26, 2006. At 15 years old, he had written compositions including piano solos and sonatas, piano concerto, string trios and quartets, music for jazz band, concert band and full orchestra. After being in the U.S. for only five months, Chen won both the Young Artist Competition sponsored by the New World Youth Orchestras and Young Composer's Contest sponsored by the University of Indianapolis, and appeared on the front page of The Indianapolis Star, The Lebanon Reporter, Hendricks County Flyer, and Plainfield magazine.

In January 2010, Chen won the senior division of the same competition. In December 2007, he won the Young Artist Competition sponsored by the Carmel Symphony Orchestra.

Chen won the IMTA Hoosier Auditions and the IMTA composition competition in 2008 and 2009, respectively. He has appeared at the Honors Recital of Indiana University Piano Academy for four consecutive years and has won first place of the duet competition in 2008 with Brook Zhang. Chen is the First Prize Winner of the 2010 Young Artist Piano Concerto Competition co-sponsored by the Paducah Symphony Orchestra and Murray State University.

== Works ==
=== 2010 ===
- A Swan for Choir [天鹅（合唱）]
- Reminiscence for Violin and Piano [回忆（小提琴与钢琴）]

=== 2009 ===
- Nian Nu Jiao for Voice Solo [念奴娇（声乐独唱）]
- Wind Quintet [木管五重奏]
- Etude in C # Minor for Piano Solo [升C小调练习曲（钢琴独奏）]
- Etude in D Minor for Piano Solo [D小调练习曲（钢琴独奏）]
- Two Fantasy Pieces for Piano Solo [梦幻曲二首（钢琴独奏）]

1. Dreamscapes [梦境]
2. Whim [心血来潮]

- Two Visions for Piano Solo [影像二首（钢琴独奏）]

1. Reverie [冥想]
2. Delusion [欺骗]

- DK the Barbarian for Trumpet, Horn, and Trombone [野人DK（小号、圆号与长号）
- Dandelion's Epic for Log Drums and Conga Drums [蒲公英史诗（木头鼓与康加鼓）]

=== 2008 ===
- String Trio [弦乐三重奏]
- Dance Under the Bridge for two Alto Saxophones [桥下之舞（中音萨克斯管二重奏）]
- Nostalgia from An Old Notebook for Concert Band [陈年笔记本之怀旧曲（管乐队）]
- The Game of Major Seconds for Piano Solo [大二度的游戏（钢琴独奏）]
- Fugue for Piano Solo [赋格（钢琴独奏）]
- Hallucination for Piano Solo [幻觉（钢琴独奏）]
- Invention for Piano Solo [二部创意曲（钢琴独奏）]

=== 2007 ===
- An Unanswered Question for Flute Solo [无回答的问号（长笛独奏）]
- Piano Concerto in G Minor [G小调钢琴协奏曲]
- The Voyage of the Dawn Treader for Orchestra [晨踏号的航程（管弦乐队）]
- An Unexpected Meeting for Piano Solo [意外的遇会（钢琴独奏）]
- String Quartet [弦乐四重奏]

=== 2006 ===
- The Last Day of School for Horn Solo [放假喽（圆号独奏）]
- The Dance of Water Splash for Piano Solo [水花之舞（钢琴独奏）]
- Prelude for Piano Solo [前奏曲（钢琴独奏）]
- Trio for Violin, Viola, and Cello [三重奏（小提琴、中提琴与大提琴）]
- Duet for Clarinet and Viola [二重奏（单簧管与中提琴）]
- Boss for Jazz Band [老大（爵士乐队）]
- Three Preludes for Piano Solo [前奏曲三首（钢琴独奏）]

1. Prelude [前奏曲]
2. Prelude [前奏曲]
3. Prelude [前奏曲]

- A Man from China for Cello Solo [有一个人来自中国（大提琴独奏）]

=== 2005 ===
- Rondo for Violin and Piano [回旋曲（小提琴与钢琴）]
- A Good Time for Flute Solo [美好时光（长笛独奏）]
- 降A大调奏鸣曲 [Piano Sonata in A Flat Major]
- 云 [Cloud]
- 飘 [Buoyancy]
- 自信 [Confidence]
- 乡野 [Pastorale]
- 大地 [Earth]
- 梵高《星月夜》 [Starry Night (Inspired by the Painting of Vincent van Gogh)]
- 动力 [Force]
- 黄河 [Yellow River]
- 秋日的诗 [An Autumn Poem]
- 香格里拉组曲 [Shangri-la: A Suite for Piano Solo]

1. 水之魅 [Charm of Water]
2. 草之秀 [Grace of Grass]
3. 雪山之神 [Goddess of Snow Mountain]
4. 理想境界 [An Ideal World]

- 鲁宾孙漂流记 [Robinson Crusoe]

=== 2004 ===
- 江南明珠 – 常州 [Gem of River South – Changzhou]
- 贝多芬印象 [Beethoven Impression]
- 中国小品 [Chinese Bagatelle]
- 爵士乐（老大） [Boss (In the Style of Jazz)]
- 夜曲 [Nocturne]
- 夜曲 [Nocturne]
- 浪漫曲 [Romance]
- F大调奏鸣曲 [Piano Sonata in F Major]
- 梦 [Dream]
- 雅典娜 [Athena]
- 维纳斯诞生 [Birth of Venus]
- 都市随想曲 [Metropolitan Capriccio]
- 遐想 [Reverie]
- 保罗•塞尚《圣维克多山》印象 [Mont Sainte-Victoire Impression (Inspired by the Painting of Paul Cézanne)]
- 乔治•比埃尔•修拉《大碗岛星期日》印象 [A Sunday Afternoon on the Island of la Grande Jatte Impression (Inspired by the Painting of Georges Pierre Seurat)]
- 克洛德•莫奈《日出》印象 [Sunrise Impression (inspired by the Painting of Claude Monet)]
- 休闲广场 [Leisure City Square]
- 克洛德•莫奈《睡莲》印象 [Waterlilies Impression (Inspired by the Painting of Claude Monet)]
- 浪漫 [Romance]
- 水乡江南 [River South – Home of Waters]
- 迎接阳光 [Embracing Light]
- D大调奏鸣曲《春天》 [Piano Sonata in D Major, “Spring”]
- 春柳 [Spring Willows]
- 夜曲 [Nocturne]
- 晨 [Dawn]
- 思乡曲 [Nostalgia]

=== 2003 ===
- 船歌 [Barcarolle]
- 快乐的新年 [Joyful New Year]
- 小夜曲 [Serenade]
- 练习曲（林中小溪） [Etude (Stream of Woods)]
- 练习曲（大海） [Etude (Ocean)]
- 月光 [Moonlight]
- 圣诞节组曲 [Christmas Suite]

1. 银色的世界 [A Silver World]
2. 平安夜 [Christmas Eve]
3. 永恒的爱 [Everlasting Love]

- 圆梦 [A Dream Fulfilled]
- 美丽的青岛 [The Beautiful Qingdao]
- 卖火柴的小女孩 [The Little Match Girl]
- 练习曲（暴风雨） [Etude (Tempest)]
