= I Show You Secrets =

Single by Pharao

from the album Pharao
- B-side: "Remix"
- Released: 6 June 1994
- Studio: Next Generation, Munich
- Genre: Eurodance; house; trance
- Length: 4:15
- Label: Dance Pool
- Songwriters: Stevie Steve; Alexander Hawking; Marcus Deon Thomas; Tomcat
- Producers: Stevie Steve; Alexander Hawking

Pharao singles chronology
"I Show You Secrets" (1994)	"There Is a Star" (1994)

Music video
- "I Show You Secrets" on YouTube

"I Show You Secrets" is a song by German Eurodance act Pharao, which consisted of Indian/German singer Kyra Pharao (Claudia Banerjee) and American rapper Deon Blue (Marcus Deon Thomas). It was released in 1994, by Dance Pool label, as the first single from the act's debut album, Pharao (1994), and was well received among music critics, hitting success in many European countries. It was written by Stevie Steve and Alexander Hawking with Deon Thomas and Tomcat, and produced by Steve and Hawking. The single was a top-10 hit in Austria, Finland, Germany, Israel and Switzerland. The music video for "I Show You Secrets" was directed by John Clayton and received A-list rotation on German music television channel VIVA.

== Background and release ==
"I Show You Secrets" was originally made before the concept of Pharao was established. Manager Thomas Wagner, who masterminded the project with producer duo DJ Stevie Steve and Alexander Hawking, told in a 1994 interview, "Everything fell in the right place. My partners had the song. Half Indian/half German singer Kyra Pharao had the right voice, and her name within the context of this mysteriously sounding music plus its lyrical message evoked images of the old Egypt."

== Critical reception ==
The song received positive reviews from music critics. Larry Flick from Billboard magazine wrote, "Pairing of lovely Indian singer Kyra Pharao and rapper Dean Thomas sparks with chemistry. She flutters over a frenetic pop/rave groove with an angelic quality, while Thomas' guttural rhymes are a fine anchor to the track's glossy synths." Pan-European magazine Music & Media remarked that the act "is already rapidly climbing the [German] Media Control charts with an imposing house track with trancy overtones. This comes as no surprise really, as it easily holds its own against some of its more familiar competitors." Music & Media editor Robbert Tilli noted, "The trance element and the softer vocals are absolutely new, while the rapper is still rather edgy."

Steve Baltin from Cash Box wrote, "Utterly pretentious in its opening in a way that you can't help but love, this smash in Germany sounds like some kind of space-age L.S.D. trip through the cosmos." He added, "Going beyond techno, 'I Show You Secrets' is a song that is at least interesting, and while everyone knows what that normally means, it's an accurate word for this song and it's not an insult. Pharao's five-song single tries something new." John Kilgo from The Network Forty named it a "superb dance number".

== Chart performance ==
"I Show You Secrets" was successful on the charts across Europe, in West Asia and North-America. The single reached the top 10 in Austria (5), Finland (3), Germany (6), Israel (5), Switzerland (6), and also peaked at number ten on the RPM Dance/Urban chart in Canada. In the act's native Germany, it peaked at number six for two weeks, after seven weeks within the German Singles Chart. The single spent 24 weeks in total within the chart. Additionally, it was a top-20 hit in Sweden (14), as well as on the Eurochart Hot 100, where it peaked at number 18 in September 1994 after eight weeks on the chart. In Belgium, the single entered the top 50 in Flanders (42), while in the UK, it peaked at number 85 in its first and only week on the UK Singles Chart, on November 6, 1994. "I Show You Secret" was also a small club hit on the RM Club Chart by Music Week, peaking at 81.

The act earned a gold record in Germany, after 250,000 singles were sold.

== Music video ==
The accompanying music video for "I Show You Secrets" was directed by John Clayton and filmed in London. It depicts the act in a basement-like surrounding. Singer Kyra sits on a throne, wearing a crown and with a snake around her neck. Rapper Dean Thomas, shirtless and sometimed with blue sunglasses, stands by her side. They are surrounded by burning fires, wires, dancers performing on a staircase-like stage and a man with an owl. Throughout the video, Egyptian hieroglyphs can be seen several times. The crown Kyra wears was handmade especially for her. "I Show You Secrets" was A-listed on German music television channel VIVA, which was very supportive of the act, in August 1994. One month later, it received "prime break out" rotation on MTV Europe.

== Track listing ==
- 12" vinyl, US

A1. "I Show You Secrets" (Mystery Of Music Mix) — 6:10
A2. "I Show You Secrets" (Radio Version) — 4:15
B1. "I Show You Secrets" (The Secret Mind Of Trance) — 6:10
B2. "I Show You Secrets" (Mystic Instrumental) — 4:55

- CD single, Europe
1. "I Show You Secrets" (Radio Version) — 4:15
2. "I Show You Secrets" (Mystery Of Music Mix) — 6:10
- CD maxi, Germany
1. "I Show You Secrets" (Radio Version) — 4:15
2. "I Show You Secrets" (Mystery Of Music Mix) — 6:10
3. "I Show You Secrets" (The Secret Mind Of Trance) — 6:10
4. "I Show You Secrets" (Mystic Instrumental) — 4:55
- CD maxi (remix 2), Europe
1. "I Show You Secrets" (Unplugged Radio Version) — 3:50
2. "I Show You Secrets" (Sandstorm Remix) — 5:37
3. "I Show You Secrets" (Remix Video Version) — 3:49
4. "I Show You Secrets" (Sandstorm Single Mix) — 3:49

== Charts ==
=== Weekly charts ===
Chart (1994–95)	Peak position
Austria (Ö3 Austria Top 40)	5
Belgium (Ultratop 50 Flanders)	42
Canada Dance/Urban (RPM)	10
Europe (Eurochart Hot 100)	18
Finland (Suomen virallinen lista)	3
Germany (GfK)	6
Israel (Israeli Singles Chart)	5
Netherlands (Dutch Top 40 Tipparade)	3
Netherlands (Dutch Single Tip)	7
Sweden (Sverigetopplistan)	14
Switzerland (Schweizer Hitparade)	6
UK Singles (OCC)	85
UK Club Chart (Music Week)	81
US Dance Club Play (Billboard)	35

=== Year-end charts ===
Chart (1994)	Position
Germany (GfK)	40

== Certifications ==
Region	Certification	Certified units/sales
Germany (BVMI)	Gold	250,000^{^}
^{^} Shipments figures based on certification alone.
