= Sedes (band) =

Polish punk rock band

- Origin: Poland
- Genres: Punk rock
- Years active: 1980–present
- Labels: Silverton
- Members: Młody; Rudy; Wojtek

Sedes is one of the oldest Polish punk rock bands, performing since 1980.

== Members ==
- Młody - vocals, bass guitar
- Rudy – drums
- Wojtek – guitar

== History ==
=== The beginnings ===
Sedes was formed in 1980 in Wrocław. The band started to gain popularity among the Wrocław independent scene and, on a preview called Musical Start, they earned first prize. In 1982, they made their first appearance at the Jarocin festival. In 1983, they were the only punk rock band to play at the festival's main stage.

Sedes' line up changed in 1984. Kucharz left the band and was replaced by Celej, while Maju started to play bass guitar. The band continued to tour, including another performance at the Jarocin festival. In 1985, the band split up.

=== Reunion ===
After many attempts to reunite the band, Młody got the band back together in 1991 with a line up featuring Młody (vocals), Rudy (drums), Para (bass guitar) and Wojtek (guitar). They appeared at Jarocin in 1992 and set off for a tour with Defekt Muzgó, giving over 50 concerts. They released their first album, Wszyscy pokutujemy on MC in 1992. The second record K… jego mać was released in 1993, and the first album was remastered for a CD release.

Shortly thereafter, Para was dismissed from the band and Młody took over as bass player. Later in 1993, an album of live material was released and a year later Sraka praptaka. In late 1995, Sedes set off for a tour with the band, Big Cyc.

Since 1997 and the release of the album, Delirium, the band has limited itself to concert performances. In 2004, a "Best of" album was released, entitled Lekcja Historii.

== Discography ==
- Wszyscy pokutujemy (1992)
- Sedes Muzgó – live (1992, live split with Defekt Muzgó)
- Live (1993, live)
- K... jego mać (1994)
- Sraka praptaka (1995)
- Delirium (1997)
- Lekcja Historii (2004, compilation)
