= Cold Cuts (Show of Hands album) =

Live album by Show of Hands
- Released: 22 July 2002
- Recorded: 2–25 November 2001, England
- Venue: Various: The Bulkeley (Beaumaris, 9 November); The Landmark Theatre (Ilfracombe, 15 November); The Phoenix (Exeter, 25 November); The Arts Centre (Darlington, 6 November); Prince Henry's Grammar School (Otley, 12 November); The Wycombe Swan (High Wycome, 2 November); The Tower Arts (Winchester, 21 November)
- Genre: Folk; English folk
- Length: 63:33
- Label: Hands on Music
- Producer: Mick Dolan

Show of Hands chronology
Cold Frontier (2001)	Cold Cuts (2002)	The Path (2003)

Cold Cuts is the third live album by English acoustic roots duo Show of Hands. Following the duo's successful Royal Albert Hall performance in 2001 which was televised as The Big Gig, the duo released the studio album Cold Frontier in September of that year, which saw the duo use a more basic instrumental set up that what they had grown accustomed to. A critical success, they followed it with The Cold Frontier Tour in November 2001. The tour was unusual in that the duo opted to perform both obscure older material and cover versions in re-arranged formats, in addition to material from Cold Frontier. Many of the tracks had never featured on a Sho of Hands album before. A critical success, the duo and Mick Dolan had recorded performances from the tour for usage as the live album Cold Cuts.

The album was released on 22 July 2002 by the duo's own record label Hands on Music. It reflects the unusual tour's track listing and re-arrangements, and was a critical success, being seen as more than just a souvenir for the tour and being a worthwhile acquisition in its own right. Despite being their sole live album to contain unreleased material, the album is often overlooked by the duo. Unlike other CD-released albums by the duo, none of its songs feature on their retrospective compilation album Roots: The Best of Show of Hands (2007), nor is the album referred to in its booklet.

== Background and tour ==
After releasing their sixth studio album Dark Fields (1997), Show of Hands focused on releasing albums of material by other artists, namely an album of traditional folk music, Folk Music (1998), and an album of contemporary cover versions designed to reflect the duo's contemporary influences, Covers (2000). The latter album presented a stripped down sound with no overdubs or multitracking. They followed this with their second concert at the Royal Albert Hall which was filmed for their VHS concert film The Big Gig – Show of Hands @ The Royal Albert Hall (2001). The film was filmed by ITV franchise holder Carlton Productions, who broadcast it on ITV Carlton as two dedicated half-hour programmes. The performance and television transmission, which themselves were a measure of the reputation the duo had built up until then, had increased interest in the duo. They recorded their ninth studio album, Cold Frontier (2001), which was co-produced between the duo and Mick Dolan, engineer for Steve Winwood, after their previous producer and manager Gerrard O'Farrell left for Australia.

Cold Frontier was their first album composed by Steve Knightley of the duo since Dark Fields. Recorded in early 2001 by the River Exe in Countess Wear, Devon, the album saw the duo return "to a more basic instrumental setup" than what they had grown accustomed to. One description noted that the duo had "created their own unique musical style by combining the narrative strengths of English and Celtic traditional music with instruments and textures from other cultures." The album was critically acclaimed, and they followed this with the seven-date The Cold Frontier Tour in November 2001. The tour was unlike previous tours by the duo; in addition to performing songs from Cold Frontier, the opportunity was taken to revisit older material and showcase some new arrangements of songs from other writers both familiar and unfamiliar. The tour, which was called a "triumph" by one critic, was recorded in part by Mick Dolan for usage as a live album. The duo's previous live albums, Show of Hands Live (1992) and Live at the Royal Albert Hall (1996), both document a single concert each, but the Cold Frontier Tour live album would be a compilation of tracks recorded across the tour. The duo named the album Cold Cuts (cold cuts), both a pun on Cold Frontier and also a reference to "deep cuts", a musical term meaning music that is generally not well known, reflecting the content of the tour and album itself.

== Music ==
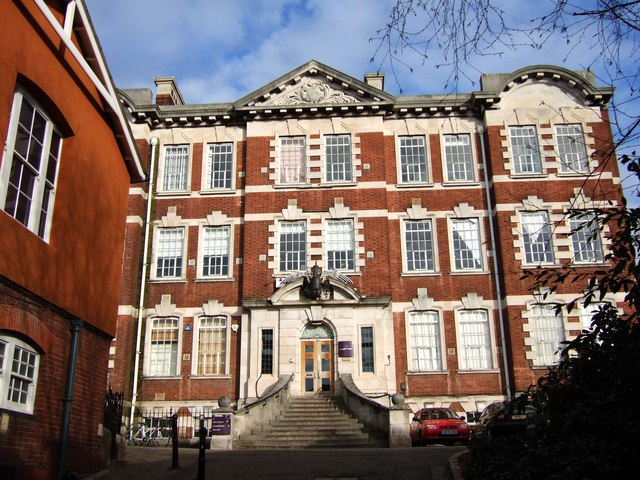
Four of the songs were recorded at The Phoenix, Exeter.

Cold Cuts was recorded over each concert of the tour and, according to the duo, features "the new, the rearranged, and the previously unreleased songs" that they played on the tour. The album features a track list faithful to the material on the tour, featuring songs from Cold Frontier, obscure older material and showcase some new arrangements of songs from other writers both familiar and unfamiliar. Roughly half of the album is cover versions, some of which had been in the duo's repertoire for a while but not all of which had previously been recorded or released onto an album. One review noted that some of the cover versions are "quite radical rethinks", but that "none prove any less than pretty fine as covers go". The cover versions of Free's "My Brother Jake", Leonard Cohen's "First They Take Manhattan" and Mike Lennon's "Rose in the Thorn" have been described as being "surprising choices" upon initial inspection, but that "show Of Hands really make them their own". The "submarine-driven reading" of Cyril Tawney's "Sally Free and Easy" is energetic.

Knightley's own Show of Hands songs on the album has mostly been re-arranged from their original versions. "Faith in You" and "Track of Words" feature pared down settings and revised pace, which puts a different complexion on the songs from their fulsome production on the earlier studio recordings. The latter song was never previously recorded by Show of Hands, originally being the title track on his 1999 album of the same name. An inspired medley, where "The Battle of the Somme" and "Time After Time" frame "The Keeper", features over three songs.

== Release ==
The album was released 22 July 2002 by the duo's own record label Hands on Music, with the catalogue number HMCD17. It was their first album packaged in a digipak since Dark Fields. All of the duo's subsequent albums released on Hands on Music have been released in digipaks. The album was released to a positive critical reception. Dave Kidman of NetRhythms said that "Cold Cuts presents a sequence of live recordings from that tour, and gives a very good indication of the duo's compelling live presence and uniformly high level of instrumental and vocal accomplishment." He was particularly praiseful of the re-arrangements of the duo's own material, and concluded that "all in all, Cold Cuts does its job really well, and in the end represents rather more than just a satisfying add-on tour memento for existing fans, being a worthwhile acquisition for its own sake." Despite the critical favour, the album been somewhat ignored by the duo. No recordings from the album featured on their retrospective compilation album Roots: The Best of Show of Hands (2007). The second disc of that album, subtitled Longdogs, featured one track each from every one of their albums, the specific tracks being chosen by an individual poll on the duo's former internet forum Longdogs. Whilst the rest of the duo's albums are covered, except for the early cassette releases which were effectively replaced with the compilation Backlog 1987–1991 (1995), Cold Cuts was the sole album omitted from the track listing. Additionally, it is also not written about in the liner notes.

== Track listing ==
All songs written by Steve Knightley, except where noted.

1. "Faith in You" – 3:34
2. "Crow on the Cradle" (Sydney Carter) – 3:57
3. "First They Take Manhattan" (Leonard Cohen) – 4:02
4. "Track of Words" – 3:46
5. "Crazy Boy" – 5:39
6. "Lonesome Stockade Blues" (Trad arr. Knightley/Phil Beer/Paul Downes) – 4:13
7. "The Battle of the Somme" (Willie Lawrie arr. Beer) – 1:52
8. "The Keeper" – 2:17
9. "Time After Time" (Rob Hyman, Cyndi Lauper) – 3:22
10. "Sally Free and Easy" (Cyril Tawney) – 5:32
11. "The Rose in the Thorn" (Mike Lennon) – 4:04
12. "My Brother Jake" (Paul Rodgers/Andy Fraser) – 3:14
13. "The Setting" (Ralph McTell) / "Mary from Dungloe" (Trad arr. Knightley/Beer) – 3:40
14. "Tall Ships" – 5:54
15. "The Train" / "Sit You Down" – 8:22

== Recorded ==
All tracks were recorded during November 2001.

- Tracks 1 and 12 at The Bulkeley, Beaumaris (9th Nov)
- Track 2 at the Landmark Theatre, Ilfracombe (15th Nov)
- Tracks 3, 6, 10 and 11 at the Phoenix, Exeter (25th Nov)
- Tracks 4 and 7 at the Arts Centre, Darlington (6th Nov)
- Track 5 at Prince Henry's Grammar School, Otley (12th Nov)
- Tracks 13 and 15 at The Wycombe Swan, High Wycombe (2nd Nov)
- Track 14 at Tower Arts, Winchester (21st Nov)
