= Cold Frontier =

Studio album by Show of Hands
- Released: 3 September 2001
- Recorded: Early 2001
- Studio: By the Countess Wear, River Exe, Exeter, Devon
- Genre: Folk; English folk
- Length: 55:50
- Label: Hands On
- Producer: Show of Hands and Mick Dolan

Show of Hands chronology
Covers (2000)	Cold Frontier (2001)	Cold Cuts (2002)

Cold Frontier is the ninth studio album by the English acoustic roots duo Show of Hands. It was recorded in early 2001 on location by the Countess Wear at the River Exe, Exeter, Devon, with Mick Dolan, engineer for Steve Winwood, co-producing the album with the duo. The album features a stripped-down, acoustic sound. The duo's website says the album is "possibly Show of Hands' finest work so far." The album comes with a full colour twenty-page booklet, all the lyrics, and comments on the background of each track.

The album was released in September 2001 by the band's label Hands on Music. It was released to positive reviews, with David Kidman of NetRhythms calling the album a "triumph".

The supporting promotional tour, "The Cold Frontier Tour", was unusual in that it mixed the album's material with older, lesser-known material from the band and cover versions of songs by artists both well-known and obscure. The tour spawned the acclaimed live album Cold Cuts (2002). The second song on Cold Frontier, "Are We Alright", was re-recorded for the duo's best-of compilation album, Roots: The Best of Show of Hands (2007), which features three other songs from the album. The song itself has become a live staple of the duo.

== Background ==
After releasing Dark Fields (1997), Show of Hands experimented with recording albums of material written by people beside the duo. Folk Music (1998) was a limited edition album feature the band's performances of traditional folk songs, while Covers (2000) featured the band's cover versions that reflect the duo's contemporary musical influences.

Released between the two albums was Steve Knightley's first solo album, Track of Words (1999), whilst Beer worked on several projects, including the concept album Ridgeriders (1999) and a collaborative album centred around the fiddle, The Fiddle Collection (1999). In 2001, they performed their second concert at the Royal Albert Hall which was filmed for their VHS concert film The Big Gig – Show of Hands @ The Royal Albert Hall (2001). The film was filmed by ITV franchise holder Carlton Productions, who broadcast it on ITV Carlton as two dedicated half-hour programmes.

== Recording and music ==
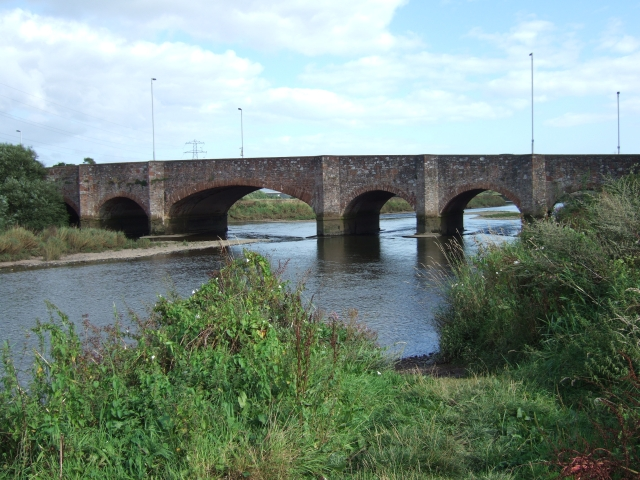
The album was recorded "on location" by the River Exe in Countess Wear.

The album was recorded in early 2001 by the River Exe in Countess Wear, Devon. The album was co-produced between Mick Dolan, engineer for Steve Winwood, and the duo. David Kidman of NetRhythms noted that the album sees the duo return "to a more basic instrumental setup". One description noted that the duo had "created their own unique musical style by combining the narrative strengths of English and Celtic traditional music with instruments and textures from other cultures." The title track and opening song, "Cold Frontier", is about "the memory of a Roman soldier on the fringes of the Empire with integration in today's European Union, whilst "The Flood" is about the flooding in Southern England. "Widecombe Fair" is about revellers, whilst "Come By" is about the "challenges facing farmers."

In 2013, Steve Knightley described "The Flood": "One of the elements that fed into that was the death of people in the process of coming here to find work and while they’re working here, in Morecambe Bay and people who were trapped in the back of trucks. I wrote a song about the floods of people and how we should have an open door policy, wherever possible, if the work is there, and as soon as we started singing it, all these horrible stories from the Mediterranean started, people perishing coming, trying to find their way to us. So you write a song that seems topical, you think it’s got a shelf life that’s limited and then current affairs come round and reinvigorate it again."

== Reception ==
The album was released on 3 September 2001 by the duo's own record label Hands on Music with the catalogue number HMCD13. The album received a positive reception from critics.

The promotional tour that supported the album, The Cold Frontier Tour, ran until the end of November 2001. The tour was unusual for the duo; in addition to performing songs from Cold Frontier, the duo also performed older material that the duo had not played in many years as well as new arrangements of songs from other writers. David Kidman of NetRhythms said that the tour was a "triumph", noting that "in addition to the songs from the album itself opportunity was taken to revisit older material and showcase some new arrangements of songs from other writers both familiar and unfamiliar." The duo recorded the live album Cold Cuts on the tour in November, before releasing the album in July 2002. "Are We Alright" was released as a double A-side single with "Crooked Man" in 2004.

Four songs from the album appear on the band's best-of retrospective compilation album Roots: The Best of Show of Hands (2007), namely a new re-recording of "Are We Alright", "Widecombe Fair", "Cold Frontier" and "You're Mine". The first three tracks appear on the first disc, subtitled Short Stories, whilst "You're Mine" appears on the second disc, subtitled Longdogs, whose songs were decided after fans of the band were asked to choose their favourite songs from each of their albums on individual polls on the band's former internet forum Longdogs, with the winners of each poll appearing on the disc. After the duo were nominated for "Best Duo" and "Best Live Act" at the BBC Radio 2 Folk Awards 2008, the re-recording of "Are We Alright" featured on the corresponding various artists compilation album.

== Track listing ==
All songs written by Steve Knightley, except where noted.

1. "Cold Frontier" – 4:15
2. "Are We Alright" – 3:10
3. "Come By" – 4:58
4. "Northwest Passage" (Stan Rogers) – 3:54
5. "Widecombe Fair" – 3:27
6. "Things I Learnt This Year" – 3:49
7. "You're Mine" – 3:59
8. "Windchanges" – 3:23
9. "Don't Look Now" – 2:43
10. "Sally Free and Easy" (Cyril Tawney) – 5:13
11. "Yeovil Town" – 3:57
12. "Cold Heart of England" – 3:24
13. "The Streets of Forbes" (traditional, arranged by Knightley/Phil Beer) – 3:37
14. "The Flood" – 5:55

== Personnel ==
- Steve Knightley – vocals, cuatro, guitar, mandocello, concertina
- Phil Beer – vocals, cuatro, fiddle, guitar, mandocello, mandolin, viola
- Paul Downes – mandocello, backing vocals (track 6)
- John Redmond – bodhran, backing vocals (track 6)
- Paul Wilson – melodeon, backing vocals (track 6)
