= Tall Ships (album) =

Studio album by Show of Hands
- Released: 1990
- Recorded: 1990
- Genre: Folk; progressive folk
- Label: Self-released
- Producer: Show of Hands

Show of Hands chronology
Show of Hands (1987)	Tall Ships (1990)	Out for the Count (1991)

Tall Ships is the second album by Show of Hands, released in 1990 on cassette only. It contains the band's 22 minute medley "Tall Ships". Songs from the album appear on Backlog 1987-1991, a 1995 album containing songs from the band's earlier material for the first time on CD. This was due to Tall Ships going out of print later in 1990.

Steve Knightley said that "Tall Ships" is set in a small West Country fishing village in the years just after the Napoleonic Wars. Some of "Tall Ships" appears on their debut Show of Hands, albeit in a different recording. The full 22 minute version appears again on Backlog 1987-1991 and Roots - The Very Best of Show of Hands.

The album is sometimes referred to as Tall Ships/Six O Clock Waltz, as "Tall Ships" takes up all of Side A whilst "Six O Clock Waltz" opens Side B.

== Background ==
Show of Hands, a Devon-based folk duo of Steve Knightley and Phil Beer, formed in 1986. Nonetheless, having known each other since 1972, they had performed before hand, for example Knightley's contribution to Beer's first live album with Paul Downes, Live in Concept (1980), and Beer's role in Knightley's pub rock bands of the 1980s, Short Stories, The Cheats and Total Strangers, when members of those bands could not appear. This is in addition to Knightley joining Beer and Downe's early 1980s band Arizona Smoke Revue. Beer joined The Albion Band in 1984, this halting collaborations between the two for a while. Nonetheless, Beer found some free time in 1987 and suggested to Knightley they form a duo.

For the recording their first album, 1987's Show of Hands, they set up their own recording studio, known as Catsley Home. The album was recorded in January 1987 to coincide with their first tour, and was sold on the tour as a cassette. Being such a small-key release, it did not attract any attention from local publications. It, and the tour, did, nonetheless, gained the band a small following. It would be three years, however, until the band could follow up the album, due to Beer losing free time due to The Albion Band recalling after their short hiatus, who recorded albums in each year from 1987 to 1990. Show of Hands successfully regrouped in 1990 to record their second album, centered around an expanded song suite, "Tall Ships", which Knightley had written prior and used with Show of Hands.

== Music ==
Tall Ships was recorded in 1990 in a home studio that the duo had set up. The album, being a cassette only release, is split between Side A and Side B, but on Tall Ships, the two sides are especially distinct due to Side A being filled by "Tall Ships", the 22-minute suite, whilst the other side contains shorter compositions. This template is not unlike several 1970s progressive rock albums.

Steve Knightley said that "Tall Ships" is set in a small West Country fishing village in the years just after the Napoleonic Wars, and tells a story of villages forced by starvation to wreck passing merchant ships, their "decks piled high" with food and stores. The song is a side-fulling suite consisting of ten distinct sections. Part of the song was previously recorded by the duo for their debut album where it opened that album. On Tall Ships, the first part of the composition, "The Wrecker’s Prayer", is a poem read aloud by actor Jim Carter, who was a friend of Knightley and at the time was little known. In addition to the Knightley compositions, the album includes a waltz, "Six O'Clock Waltz".

"Tall Ships", "Domination of the Sword" and "Lovers Never Friends" were chosen as highlights of the album by the duo, due to them including them on their 1995 compilation album Backlog 1987–1991, which features duo-selected highlights of the band's first three, cassette-only albums. On this album, "Lovers Never Friends" is retitled to the grammatically correct "Lovers, Never Friends".

== Release and reception ==
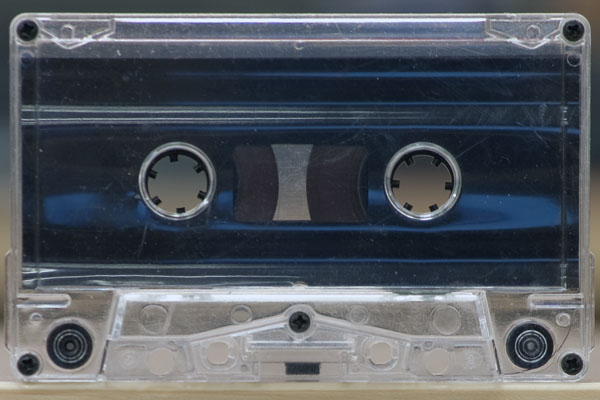
As with its direct predecessor and successor, Tall Ships was only released on cassette.

Much mirroring the release scheme of their first album, Tall Ships was self-released only on cassette in 1990, and sold at the duo's live performances. The band played mostly at mostly pubs and small clubs at the time. The cassette received a favourable reception from attenders, but being a much low-key release, it was not reviewed in any local publications.

Following the album's release, Phil Beer left The Albion Band, allowing Show of Hands to become a full-time musical partnership. They subsequently recorded one final cassette-only album, 1991's Out for the Count, but before they released their first studio CD, release, 1994's Beat about the Bush, they would form the Anglo-Chilean band Alianza for one album in 1992, and record a Show of Hands live performance in 1992 for released in 1994 as Show of Hands Live.

Along with Show of Hands and Out for the Count, Tall Ships never returned to print after its original run in 1990. To keep the availability of music from the cassettes that the band likes most, on their newly established own label Hands on Music, they released a compilation album in 1995 of the name Backlog 1987–1991, which features highlights of the three cassette albums, including three of the six tracks from Tall Ships. For their 2007 best-of compilation album, Roots: The Best of Show of Hands, one track from this album appeared, "Tall Ships", retained in its full 22-minute length at the end of the second disc, this disc being subtitled Longdogs because the songs on it were chosen using the winners in polls on the band's forum Longdogs to find the best songs from each of their albums. In this booklet of Roots: The Best of Show of Hands, the album is referred to as Tall Ships/Six O'Clock Waltz.

== Track listing ==
1. "Tall Ships"
  1. "Wreckers Prayer Part One"
  2. "Tall Ships"
  3. "Spanish Ladies"
  4. "Tall Ships Part One"
  5. "Rambling Sailor"
  6. "Winter's Welcome"
  7. "Storm"
  8. "Wreckers Prayer Part Two"
  9. "Well Bred Clowns"
  10. "Tall Ships Part Two"
2. "Six O Clock Waltz"
3. "Deads Will Roll"
4. "Don't It Feel Good"
5. "Dominion of the Sword"
6. "Lovers Never Friends"
