= Out for the Count =

Studio album by Show of Hands
- Released: 1991
- Recorded: 1991
- Studio: The Old Court
- Genre: Folk
- Label: Self-released

Show of Hands chronology
Tall Ships (1990)	Out for the Count (1991)	Show of Hands Live (1992)

Out for the Count is the third album by Show of Hands. The album follows Phil Beer's departure from The Albion Band in 1990, allowing Show of Hands to become a full-time partnership. Recorded straight to Digital Audio Tape in The Old Court, Devon, in 1991, the duo released the album later on in the year on cassette, becoming the final of their cassette-only releases.

The album was released to a positive reception from concert goers, but as with the duo's previous releases, it did not bring the bang attention from any publications. The duo followed the release with their first CD release, Show of Hands Live (1992). By 1995, Out for the Count and the duo's first two albums were out of print, so the duo released the compilation album Backlog 1987–1991 (1995) containing material from the three albums, including five songs from Out for the Count. It is the only Show of Hands album to not have any of its songs featured on Roots: The Best of Show of Hands, however several of their albums that do have a song featured were re-recorded for the compilation.

== Background and recording ==
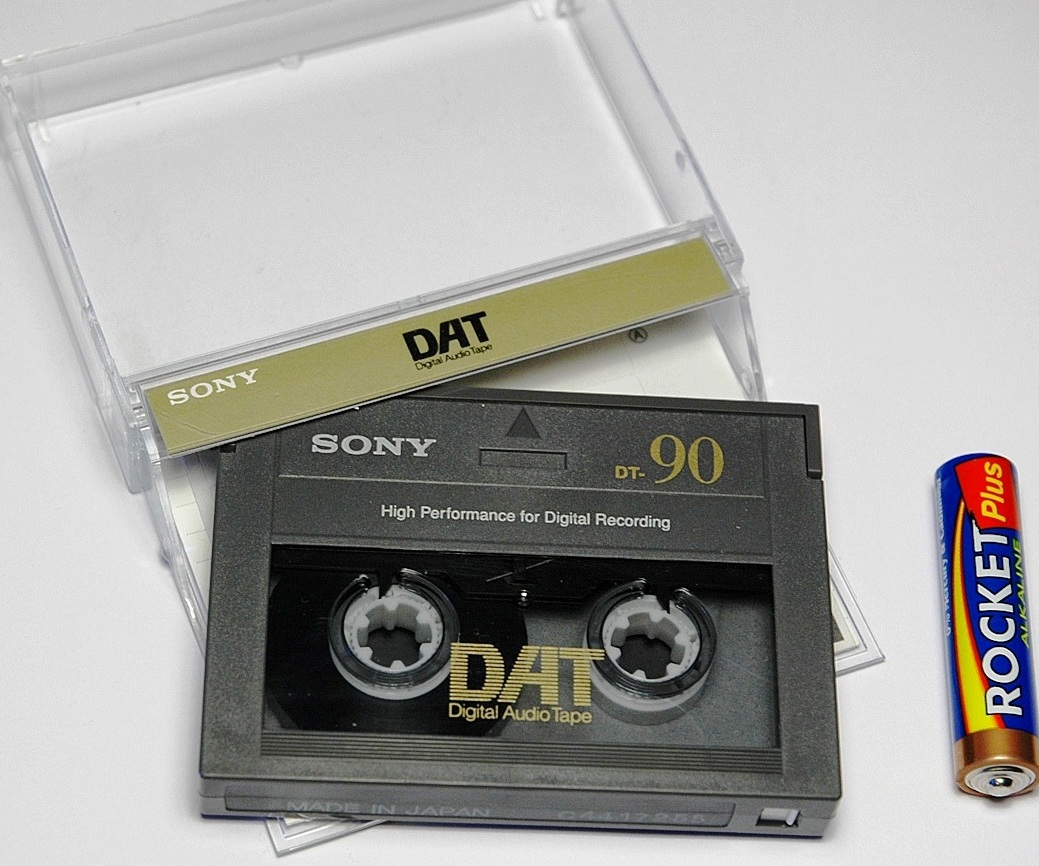
The songs on the album were recorded straight to Digital Audio Tape.

Show of Hands, a Devon-based folk duo of Steve Knightley and Phil Beer, formed in 1986. Nonetheless, having known each other since 1972, they had performed before hand, including when Knightley contributed to Beer's first live album with Paul Downes, Live in Concept (1980), and Beer's role in Knightley's pub rock bands of the 1980s, Short Stories, The Cheats and Total Strangers, when members of those bands could not appear. This is in addition to the duo and Downe's early 1980s band Arizona Smoke Revue. Beer joined The Albion Band in 1984, this halting collaborations between the two for a while. Nonetheless, Beer found some free time in 1987 and suggested to Knightley they form a duo. The duo recorded their first two albums, Show of Hands (1987) and Tall Ships (1990) in small home studios, and sold them only as cassette releases at the duo's concerts.

In 1990, Beer left The Albion Band, allowing Show of Hands to become a full-time musical partnership. The duo set to recording their third album very shortly afterwards. They traveled to The Old Court, Devon, in 1991 to record their third album "by the fire" there. Titled Out for the Count, each of its songs was recorded straight to Digital Audio Tape (DAT) without any overdubs or other studio work, presenting a basic "live" sound. The songs were mostly written by Knightley. "Limbo" is a cover version of a Jimmy Cliff song.

== Release and legacy ==
The album was self-released by the duo in 1991. As with the duo's previous two albums, it was released on cassette, and only sold at the duo's concerts. Being much a low-key release, it was not reviewed by any local publications, but attenders to the concerts greeted the release with praise. Following its release, the duo recorded their first CD studio album and live album, Show of Hands Live, on 8 June 1992 in Bridport. That same year, they also formed the Anglo-Chilean band Alianza who released one album. Out for the Count turned out to be the duo's final cassette release.

By 1995, neither Out for the Count or the duo's first two albums were available any longer, having gone out of print. Show of Hands Live had effectively become their debut album, with it being the earliest album still acknowledged by the duo. To make sure music from the first three albums was still available to fans, they released the compilation album Backlog 1987–1991 (1995) on their own label Hands on Music. The compilation contains what the duo considered to be the best songs from their first three albums. Five songs from Out for the Count feature on the compilation album, namely "The Tramp Stamp/Chasing The Jack", "Limbo", "The Leaving Blues", "Walking in the Rain" and "Pleasures of the Town/Seneca Two-Step". Beer would re-record "Limbo" for his solo album Rhythm Methodist (2005), his version being described as being closer to The Neville Brothers' interpretation of the song.

== Track listing ==
1. "Berlin"
2. "Limbo"
3. "Walking in the Rain"
4. "Tramp Stamp / Chasing the Jack"
5. "Leaving Blues"
6. "Winter Has Gone"
7. "Positively 4th Street"
8. "Pleasures of the Town" / "Seneca Two Step"
9. "Poorman"
10. "Mess Of Blues"

== Personnel ==
- Steve Knightley (vocals, guitar)
- Phil Beer (guitar, fiddles, vocals)
