= Folk music (disambiguation) =

Folk music is a genre of music.

Folk music may also refer to:

- Traditional folk music
- Contemporary folk music, a wide variety of genres that emerged in the mid 20th century and afterwards
- Folk Music (album) by the band Show of Hands
- Folk Music (Far East Movement album)
