= Dark Fields (album) =

Studio album by Show of Hands
- Released: 15 December 1997
- Studios: Airfield Studios, St Merryn, Cornwall, England
- Genres: Folk; English folk
- Length: 60:12
- Label: Hands on Music HMCD03
- Producers: Show Of Hands and Gerard O’Farrell

Show of Hands chronology
Live at the Royal Albert Hall (1996)	Dark Fields (1997)	Folk Music (1998)

Singles from Dark Fields
- 1. "Crazy Boy" Released: Autumn 1997

Dark Fields is the sixth studio album by English acoustic roots duo Show of Hands, released in 1997 on their own label Hands on Music. The album follows the duo's 1996 performance at the Royal Albert Hall in London, a performance which raised their profile. A live album of the performance was released as Live at the Royal Albert Hall in August, becoming the band's best selling album. The duo followed the success with Dark Fields.

Recorded in St Merryn, Dark Fields features Knightley's characteristic West Country-focused lyrics and a "live" sound carried over from their previous studio release Lie of the Land (1995). The album was released in May 1997, received positive reviews from critics. The band also released a single from the album, "Crazy Boy", which was the band's first single.

== Background ==
With their 1995 album Lie of the Land, Devon-based folk duo Show of Hands, consisting of Steve Knightley and Phil Beer, found the most success in their career so far. Whilst that album's predecessor, Beat about the Bush (1994), aimed for radio play by incorporating a full band set up, it did not receive the air play wanted. The duo then sought for a stripped down, more acoustic sound for Lie of the Land which felt more like the duo's live performances. The album was released in 1995 on Isis Records, and unlike their previous album, it found attention from major publications, such as Mojo and Q, with the latter subsequently naming it the "folk album of the year". The duo received more attention and, by early 1996, they had by now built up a considerable fanbase through their mailing list. Knightley, Beer and manager O’Farrell, who had produced Lie of the Land, took the gamble of hiring London's Royal Albert Hall for a performance on the evening of 24 March 1996, in attempt to gather all of the duo's fans, and to raise the duo's profile.

Whilst a certainly ambitious idea, the duo hired the hall "to the amusement of the media and the cynicism of sceptics" and was considered a huge gamble. Nonetheless, the performance sold out in advance. Selling out the hall was unprecedented for a folk act. One biography said that the success "proved that for this enigmatic, indy duo anything was possible." Knightley said in 1997 that "people still talk about it in glowing terms." He also noted that "quite a lot of people now know Show Of Hands as 'Those guys who did the Albert Hall'. So it's opened a lot of doors. In India there was a tremendous cachet - we were checked out by people who came to see us just because of having played the Royal Albert Hall. In America as well. So it exceeded all our expectations in that sense."

O'Farrell commenced producing the performance as a live album, whose production work on Lie of the Land pleased the duo, who also liked the live sound of their previous live album Show of Hands Live, produced by Mike Trim. The album cost £200 on the night to record. The live album was released in August 1996 as Live at the Royal Albert Hall, which became the duo's best-selling album. With this new tinge of success that the strength of the Albert Hall built open, Knightley noted that "it's easier to get in local papers. But we now need to replace that with a story about the music. That's the dilemma." With this in mind, the duo decide it was time "for a new studio recording"., and the duo began work on their sixth album, Dark Fields in 1997.

== Music and lyrics ==
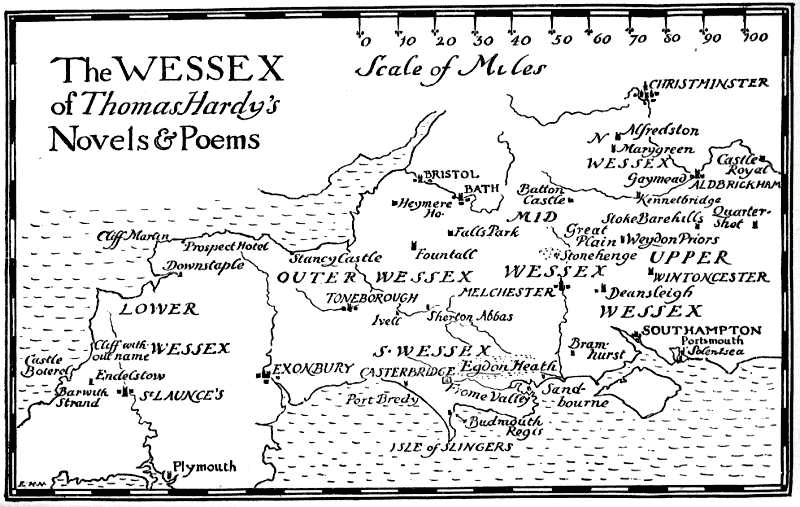
A map of locations in Wessex. Wessex is the subject matter of the album's "Wessex Medley".

The duo co-produced Dark Fields with manager Steve O'Farrell who produced Lie of the Land and Live at the Royal Albert Hall, and recorded it at Joe Partridge's Airfield studios in St Merryn, Cornwall, with the studio commencing recording here due to Knightley's pleasant experience when working on a Mike Silver album at the studio several years prior. Knightley later commented that, "wonderfully equipped and utterly secluded, [the duo] locked themselves away for a week or so" to record the album.

One reviewer noted that "the majority of the subjects [on the album] peopling "Dark Fields" exude Englishness. On one hand there are the misfits - hedonistic teenager, dyed-in-the-wool poacher. Another hand highlights slave traders or recruiting sergeants - murky historical characters trapped by their time. On the third hand, the West Country's exiled miners and heroic emergency servants are given the benefit of Knightley's sympathetic pen. And on the final hand, leavening the proceedings, there are a brace of unrequited love-stories and a terrifyingly competent tune set." Knightley noted in 2007 that the album's production was generally based on the duo's live sound, despite being "more rounded", and also noted that "many of the songs on this album are still concert standards".

"Cousin Jack", the opening track, remains one of the duo's best known and most performed songs. The song is about the Cornish diaspora miners who became known as "Cousin Jacks". The fourth track is a "Wessex Medley". The twelfth track, "High Germany/Molly Oxford", was recorded live at Norwich in spring 1997. It is the first time the duo included a live performance on a studio album. Over half of the tracks on the album are Steve Knightley compositions, the others traditional pieces arranged by the duo, other than a cover version of Bob Dylan's "Farewell Angelina" and Nic Jones' arrangement of "Warlike Lads of Russia", a track described by one reviewer as "just the kind of blatant altruism which Zimmerman of Hibbing notably omitted to display a few years back." "The Bristol Slaver" is about the Bristol slave trade and "Crazy Boy" is about a "bored teenager", whilst "Longdog" is about poachers and "The Shout" is about voluntary emergency services.

The album features numerous guest musicians. Chris While, of Beer's former band The Albion Band, sings vocals on the song "Dark Fields". Matt Clifford also plays keyboards on that track and three others. For the "Wessex Medley", a medley that first consists of Beer's composition "Carrick Roads", then "Plum Pudding", a traditional piece arranged by Knightley and Beer, and finally Beer's "The Rocky Road to Chudleigh", melodeon was provided by Simon Care. The seventh song, "Flora", features percussion by Joe Partridge and backing vocals from Lucy Watkins, Richard Hammond and Paul Banham who also sing backing vocals on "The Shout". The live track, "High Germany"/"Molly Oxford", features vocals from Kate Rusby, fiddle from Chris Wood and melodeon from Andy Cutting.

Of the duo, Steve Knightley sings all lead vocals, as well as playing guitar, cuatro, mandocello, concertina, acoustic bass guitar and mandolin on the album. Meanwhile, Phil Beer sings other vocals and plays guitars, mandolin, fiddle, cuatro, viola and mandocello. This album marks the first two appearances of the song "The Train" on a Show of Hands studio album. Firstly appearing as the album's sixth track, it is featured again in the form of a ten-minute reprise as a hidden track following ten minutes of silence after "High Germany" / "Molly Oxford", the last track on the album. It is the first of three hidden tracks by the duo. The band's following album, Folk music features a new combination of the song with "Blackwaterside". The band's 2002 live album, Cold Cuts features another new combination of the song with "Sit You Down". The band's 2005 live album, As You Were features a new medley which features "The Train" followed by "Santiago" and "The Soldier's Joy".

== Release and reception ==
To try to build on the duo's success, and to promote Dark Fields, the duo agreed to release their first single, choosing the album's eighth track "Crazy Boy", backed with the B-sides "The Train Trilogy" and "Crow on the Cradle". In a 1997 interview, Steve Knightley said "for now we're putting out the present single 'Crazy Boy' to see if we can get an Indie Chart placing or whatever - radio, TV. Maybe that will be the next story, the guys who sold 8,000 singles, or the guys who got to number 50. Whatever. That's the idea for this Autumn." Despite the ambitions, the single failed to chart on the UK Singles Chart. The band would not release any more singles until "Are We Alright"/"Crooked River" in 2004. This excludes the music video produced for 2003's "Country Life", taken from the album of the same name.

Although the "Crazy Boy" single was released in Autumn 1997, Dark Fields was released several months later in December 1997. It was the first time the duo released a studio album anew on their label Hands on Music, who, prior to the release of Dark Fields, had re-released Lie of the Land and released the live album, as well as 1995 compilation album Backlog 1987–1991. Dark Fields was released as a digipak, their first album to do so. This package pleased reviewer Alan Rose. The album cover, which features a silhouette of a wicker man burning in front of a dark sky, was decided by the duo's long time sleeve designer Rob O'Connor and was described by Knightley in 2007 as being "striking". The lyric booklet refers to itself as the Dark Fields Song Book.

Dark Fields was released to positive reviews; Alan Rose of The Living Tradition published a positive review for the album, praising the record and highlighting "The Warlike Lads of Russia" as "rightly honoured" and calling the tune set of the album "terrifyingly competent.". Dake Tuxford of the same publication, in a review for a subsequent album, described Dark Fields as a "winning mix of Knightley's own well-crafted songs, carefully-selected material from the best contemporary songwriters and traditional material," and referring to the record as a "polished" album "whose 'thoughtful lyricism and mood shifts' impressed even the hard-boiled Daily Telegraph reviewer."

The duo toured in promotion of the album, and footage from the tour featured on the duo's 1998 documentary/concert film Stairway to Devon, released on VHS by Hands on Music. The film is self-described as "world music from the West Country". The duo would not release a studio album of new songs until Cold Frontier in September 2001. In the intervening time they recorded an album of traditional songs, Folk Music in September 1998, and an album of cover versions of songs, Covers (2000). "Wessex Medley" from Dark Fields was included on the various artists compilation album A Celebration of English Folk (2008).

== Track listing ==
Tracks written by Steve Knightley, except where noted.

1. "Cousin Jack" – 5:09
2. "Longdog" – 2:45
3. "The Shout" – 4:00
4. "Wessex Medley": "Carrick Roads" (Phil Beer) / "Plum Pudding" (Trad arr. Knightley/Beer) / "The Rocky Road to Chudleigh" (Beer) – 3:40
5. "Dark Fields" – 3:50
6. "The Train" – 3:30
7. "Flora" (Trad arr. Knightley/Beer) – 4:22
8. "Crazy Boy" – 5:40
9. "The Warlike Lads of Russia" (Trad arr. Nic Jones) – 2:21
10. "Farewell Angelina" (Bob Dylan) – 5:02
11. "The Bristol Slaver" – 3:55
12. "High Germany" (trad arr Knightley) / "Molly Oxford" (Trad arr. Chris Wood/Andy Cutting) (Live recording) – 6:24

"The Train (reprise)" - 9:27 (hidden track, follows "High Germany" / "Molly Oxford")

== Personnel ==
- Steve Knightley - vocals, guitar, cuatro, mandocello, concertina, acoustic bass guitar, mandolin
- Phil Beer - vocals, guitars, mandolin, fiddle, cuatro, viola, mandocello
- Matt Clifford - keyboards (tracks 1, 3, 5 and 7)
- Chris While - vocals (track 5)
- Simon Care - melodeon (track 4)
- Joe (he's around somewhere) Partridge - percussion (track 7)
- Lucy Watkins, Richard Hammond, and Paul Banham - vocals (tracks 3 and 7)
- Kate Rusby - vocals (track 12)
- Chris Wood - fiddle (track 12)
- Andy Cutting - melodeon (track 12)
