= Sidmouth Folk Festival =

Annual music and dance festival in Sidmouth, England

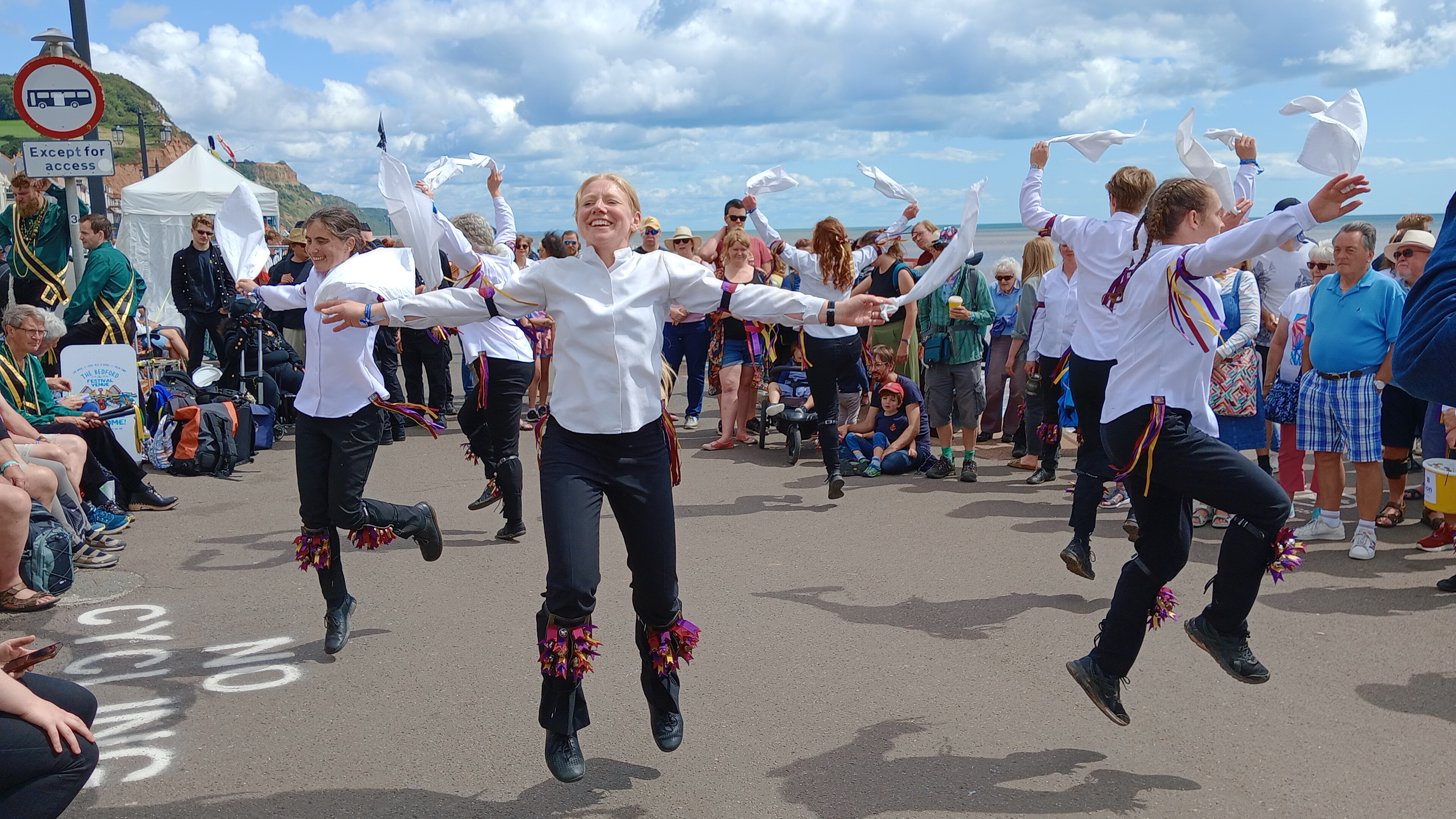
- Pecsætan women's Cotswold Morris side dancing on Sidmouth Esplanade during the 2023 festival
- Status: active
- Genre: Folk music and dance festival
- Frequency: Annually in the first week of August
- Location: Sidmouth
- Coordinates: 50.6793°N 3.2350°W
- Country: United Kingdom
- Founded: 1955; 71 years ago
- Founder: English Folk Dance and Song Society
- Attendance: 65,000
- Capacity: 25,000
- Patrons: Martin Carthy MBE; Show of Hands
- Website: sidmouthfolkfestival.co.uk

There has been a folk festival in the coastal town of Sidmouth in South West England in the first week of August every year since 1955, attracting tens of thousands of visitors to over 700 diverse events.

Sidmouth Folk Festival offers a wide range of activities including major folk concerts, pub sessions, workshops and master classes, social dances and dance displays, family entertainment and many children's musical and craft activities. The Late Night Extra feature is also run at Bulverton on the edge of Sidmouth next to the main campsite.

The festival patron is Martin Carthy.

== History ==
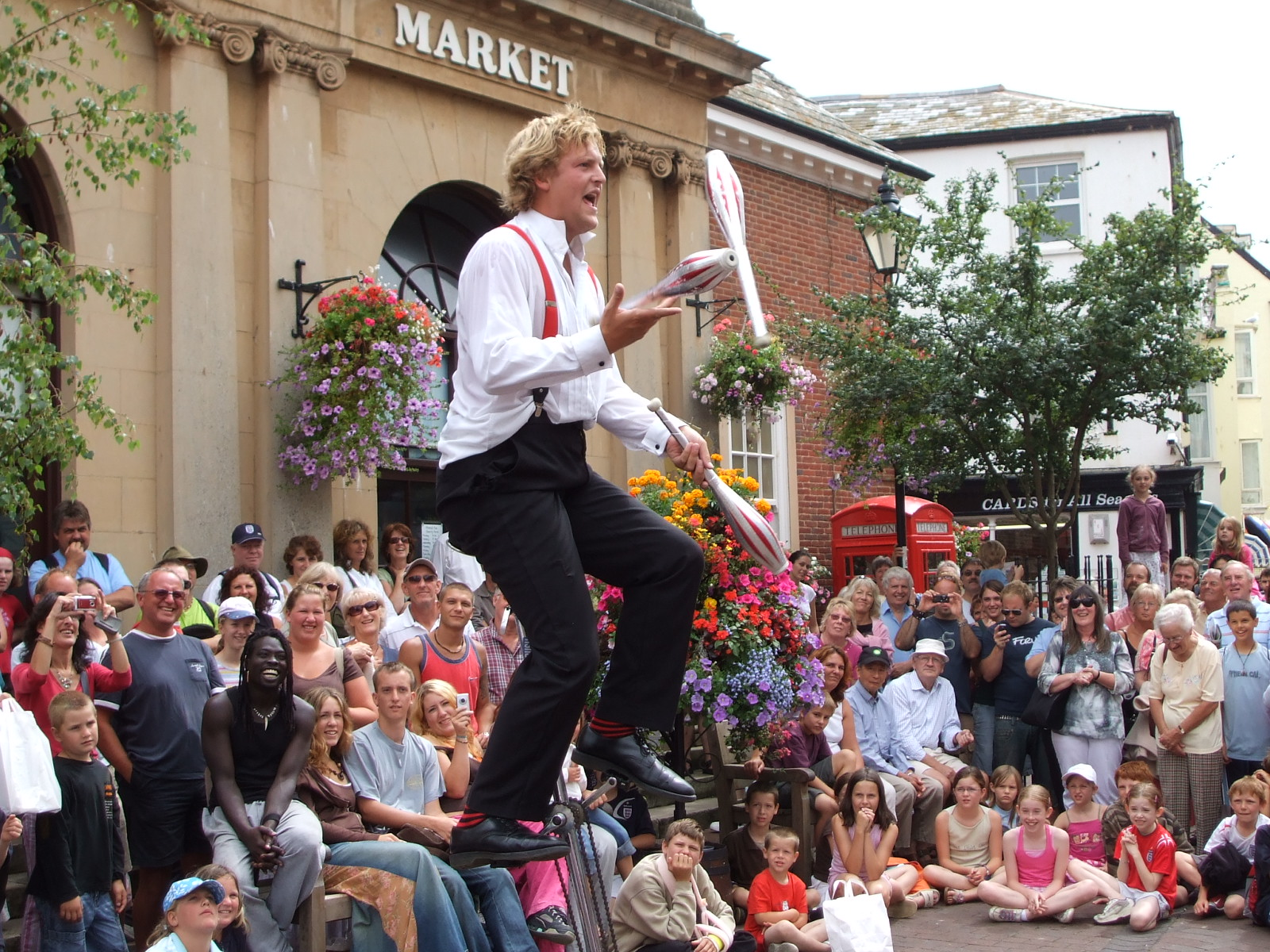
Goronwy Thom performing during Sidmouth Folk Week, 2006

Sidmouth Festival was founded as a folk dance festival in 1955 by the English Folk Dance and Song Society (EFDSS), but gradually expanded to cover ceilidh dancing, music and song, as well as related folk crafts. Over time, the scope also broadened to include performers from abroad, and the festival was renamed the Sidmouth International Folklore Festival.

From 1986, the festival was managed by Mrs Casey Music, who retitled it Sidmouth International Festival. The festival grew to over 65,000 visitors a year. In 1995 it became the birthplace of Shooting Roots, which provided a variety of workshops for young people and has played a key role in nurturing a network of young performers.

In 2004 the festival celebrated its 50th year. Derek Schofield's book, The First Week in August – Fifty Years of the Sidmouth Festival, describing the history of the festival was published.

2004 was also the year in which Mrs Casey Music announced that they would no longer be running the festival. This was due to funding issues brought on in part by the 'rainy year' of 1997 which depleted much of the festival's financial reserves and in part by East Devon District Council withdrawing funding.

For several months, the future of the festival was uncertain, but the grass-roots folkie festival-goers wanted their Sidmouth festival to continue. Various groups of people, individuals and organisations began planning events for 2005 for their own particular aspect of the folk scene, and by November 2004 a steering group had been set up to co-ordinate and publicise these events under the new name of Sidmouth Folk Week. The 2005 event was much smaller than Sidmouth International Festival, it did not use the Arena Showground owing to financial risk involved, had fewer international performers and no season tickets. Nevertheless, it proved a resounding success, and so Sidmouth Folkweek was reborn.

In 2005, Sidmouth FolkWeek Limited was registered as a charity with the object of promoting "... an annual festival of folk arts and other associated events."

The festival's name was changed back to Sidmouth Folk Festival in December 2018.

In 2020 the festival was cancelled due to the COVID-19 pandemic. The festival returned in 2021 although there were no official dance displays.

== Some festival performers ==
The 2022 Folk Festival featured Spiers and Boden, Eddi Reader, Fisherman's Friends, among others.

The 2018 Folk Week featured Fairport Convention, the Ukulele Orchestra of Great Britain, Roger McGough, Show of Hands, and Jackie Oates, among others.

The 2014 festival included performances by Ralph McTell, Steve Knightley, Jim Causley, Jackie Oates, India Electric Co., Phillip Henry & Hannah Martin, Martin Simpson, Alex Kumar, Matt Gordon & Leonard Podolak, festival patron Martin Carthy, and others throughout the week.

The 2013 Sidmouth Folk Week included concerts by Show of Hands with Miranda Sykes, Blowzabella, Colum Sands, the a capella singers Coope, Boyes and Simpson, Tim Eriksen, John Kirkpatrick, Jim Causley, Maddy Prior with Hannah James and Giles Lewin, The Spooky Men's Chorale from Australia, and Jeff Warner from New England in the USA.

The 2007 event featured concerts by Show of Hands, Altan, Liz Ryder, The Spooky Men's Chorale, Eliza Carthy, Nancy Kerr and Vin Garbutt.

The 2006 Sidmouth Folk Week included Blue Murder, Seth Lakeman and Roy Bailey.

== Dance displays ==
The festival includes a programme of dance displays with many morris, sword and other traditional dance teams performing throughout the week.

Grenoside longsword dance performed by Newcastle Kingsmen Sword Dancers at Sidmouth Folk Festival, 2022

Side invited to the 2022 festival included Boss Morris, Campden Morris Dancers, First Class Stamp, Fool's Gambit Morris, Lancashire Wallopers, Leominster Morris, Mortimer's Morris, Newcastle Kingsmen, Rumworth Morris, Seven Champions Molly Dancers, Sheffield Steel Rapper and Sidmouth Mummers.

The sides performed in a range of Dance Spectaculars in Connaught Gardens and the Blackmore Gardens Marquee, and also around the town centre and on the Esplanade.
