= Covers (Show of Hands album) =

Studio album by Show of Hands
- Released: 2000
- Recorded: January 2000
- Studio: Chudleigh Town Hall, Devon
- Genre: Folk; contemporary folk
- Length: 49:32
- Label: Hands on Music
- Producer: Gerard O’Farrell

Show of Hands chronology
Folk Music (1998)	Covers (2000)	Cold Frontier (2001)

Covers is the eighth studio album by English acoustic roots duo Show of Hands. The album was released in 2000 by the duo's own label Hands on Music. The album exclusively features cover versions of thirteen songs by the duo, chosen and recorded to reflect the band's contemporary musical influences. As such, the album contains no Steve Knightley compositions. The album was recorded over two days in Chudleigh Town Hall, Devon, with producer Gerald O'Farrell, and features only "straight performances", with its songs being untouched by post-production or techniques such as overdubbing or double tracking, presenting a "live" sound. The album followed their limited edition release Folk Music (1998), which featured the band's versions of traditional folk songs, and was the duo's first array into creating an album of music without Knightley compositions.

The album was released to a positive critical reception, with Dave Tuxford of Living Tradition was "superbly produced" and that "it's unlikely that you'll be less than impressed." The album's cover version of Billy Joel's "The Downeaster 'Alexa'" was featured on the band's compilation album Roots: The Best of Show of Hands (2007). A follow-up album of cover versions, Covers 2, was recorded with Miranda Sykes and released in November 2010.

== Background ==
In 1996, Show of Hands performed at the Royal Albert Hall, London, with the performance resulting in the live album Live at the Royal Albert Hall. The performance was not expected to be a success, but tickets sold out in advance, and the live album became the band's best-selling album. Steve Knightley of the duo noted that as a result of its success, "it's easier to get in local papers. But we now need to replace that with a story about the music. That's the dilemma." The following album Dark Fields (1997) was ultimately a critical success, despite its single "Crazy Boy" underperforming commercially.

After touring in promotion of Dark Fields, the duo recorded Folk Music (1998), an album featuring the band's new versions of traditional folk songs, released only for a short time at the band's concerts and on their website. The duo had not previously recorded an album of music that did not feature any compositions by Knightley, disregarding the album's rendition of "The Train". Although the album was a limited edition, its concept would prove inspirational on the duo for their next album. With Knightley releasing his solo album Track of Words (1999), Show of Hands did not want to work on another album featuring Knightley's songs so quickly, and instead, the duo decided to record an album of cover versions that reflected the band's increasing number of contemporary influences.

== Recording and music ==
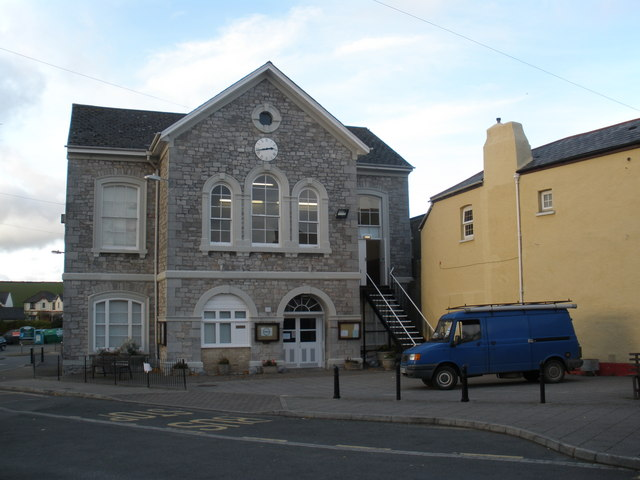
The album was recorded at Chudleigh Town Hall (pictured).

The album was recorded at Chudleigh Town Hall, Devon, over two days in January 2000. Recording with regular producer Gerald O'Farrell, the duo decided on capturing a "live" sound for the album, with no post-production work. The album contains what Knightley described as "straight performances"; the duo set up a small PA system in the hall and recorded into it, with Knightley noting that what "came out on the other end was the finished production". As such, the album contains no multitracking or overdubs, and the duo are the only musicians to feature on the album, becoming their first album not to feature guest musicians.

The album contains thirteen cover versions, chosen by the duo to reflect some of their contemporary musical influences. The album has been described as "eclectic". One of the songs, "Counting is a Pleasure", is a traditional song, featuring Nic Jones' arrangement of the song. The album opens with a "sensitive reading" of Ian Anderson's "Wond'ring Around". Their cover version of Lowell George's "Willin'" was described as "gutsy", whilst their version of Mike Chapman's "lament to a lost love", "No Song to Sing", is complemented by their version of Ralph McTell's "leaving song", "The Setting", which the duo had "skilfully interwoven" with the traditional Celtic piece "Mary from Dungloe". The album concludes with an acoustic version of The Kinks' "Waterloo Sunset".

== Release ==
The album was released in early 2000 on the band's own label Hands on Music with the catalogue number HMCD12. The album's artwork is completely black and white, bar the silver face of the CD. The album received a positive reception from music critics. Dave Tuxford of Living Tradition praised the album as an "eclectic collection ranging from Tom Robinson to Bob Dylan" and noted to readers that "if you're a fan you're bound to enjoy this CD, superbly produced as usual by Gerard O'Farrell. Even if you're not, it's unlikely that you'll be less than impressed."

Following its release, the band returned to recording albums of their own compositions, beginning with Cold Frontier (2001). Nonetheless, in November 2010, they released a follow-up album to Covers entitled Covers 2. The album, a collaboration with Miranda Sykes, was again an attempt to reflect the duo's influences. In 2007, the duo's cover of Billy Joel's "The Downeaster 'Alexa'" from Covers was featured on the band's best-of retrospective compilation album Roots: The Best of Show of Hands. The cover appeared on the second disc, Longdogs, whose track list was decided by fans of the band were asked to choose their favourite songs from each of the duo's albums on polls created on the band's former internet forum Longdogs.

== Track listing ==
1. "Wond'ring Aloud" (Ian Anderson) – 2:08
2. "Rigging It Up Duncannon" (Tom Robinson) – 3:16
3. "Willin'" (Lowell George) – 3:37
4. "No Song To Sing" (Mike Chapman) – 4:49
5. "Corinna Corinna" (Bob Dylan) – 3:01
6. "The Setting" (Ralph McTell) – 3:35
7. "The Downeaster 'Alexa'" (Billy Joel) – 3:08
8. "Fake Plastic Trees" (Thom Yorke) – 4:47
9. "Is Your Love In Vain" (Bob Dylan) – 3:00
10. "Courting Is A Pleasure" (Trad arr. Nic Jones) – 4:59
11. "Roaring Water Bay" (John Richards) – 3:52
12. "Don't Give Up" (Peter Gabriel) – 5:17
13. "Waterloo Sunset" (Ray Davies) – 3:56

== Personnel ==
- Steve Knightley – vocals, mandocello, guitar
- Phil Beer – vocals, fiddle, mandolin, guitar, mandocello
