= Folk Music (album) =

Studio album by Show of Hands
- Released: 1998
- Recorded: September 1998
- Genre: Traditional folk
- Length: 36:24
- Label: Hands on Music
- Producer: Gerard O’Farrell

Show of Hands chronology
Dark Fields (1997)	Folk Music (1998)	Covers (2000)

Folk Music is the seventh studio album by English acoustic roots duo Show of Hands. After the successes of their 1996 Royal Albert Hall performance and their subsequent album Dark Fields (1997), the duo decided to record a limited edition album featuring the duo's renditions of traditional folk music. It was recorded in September 1998 as a project to connect the band to their roots.

It was released as a limited edition release in late 1998 on the band's own label Hands on Music. It was only released via postal order and at the band's concerts and was not reviewed by music press. It was out of print for many years before being re-released in 2015 as a free download to those on the duo's mailing list.

== Background and content ==
After Show of Hands performed an unexpectedly highly successful performance at the Royal Albert Hall in 1996, they released the concert as a live album entitled Live at the Royal Albert Hall, which became the duo's best-selling album. Steve Knightley of the duo noted that as a result of the success of the performance, "it's easier to get in local papers. But we now need to replace that with a story about the music. That's the dilemma." The duo followed the success with Dark Fields (1997), an album which the duo had intended to build on their success. Whilst very much a critical success, the single released from the album, "Crazy Boy", commercially underperformed.

In 1998, the duo promoted Dark Fields with a tour. During the tour, the duo decided that they would not so quickly release a new album of music that the duo had composed. Knightley had begun writing songs, but would use them for his first solo album Track of Words (1999). The duo decided to release a limited edition album of the band's renditions of traditional folk music to "connect them to their roots". The duo recorded the album in September 1998 and were pleased with the results. The album contains ten versions of traditional folk songs, as well as a hidden track featuring a short version of "High Germany", a song that the duo had previously recorded live for their previous album Dark Fields.

Track 10, “The Train” / “Blackwaterside”, includes "The Train". This is the third appearance on a Show of Hands album for the song, following its inclusion on Dark Fields and the 10-minute reprise of the song which takes the form of a hidden track also on Dark Fields. “The Train” / “Blackwaterside” is the only song still available from the album on CD, as it was released on the best-of album Roots.

== Release ==
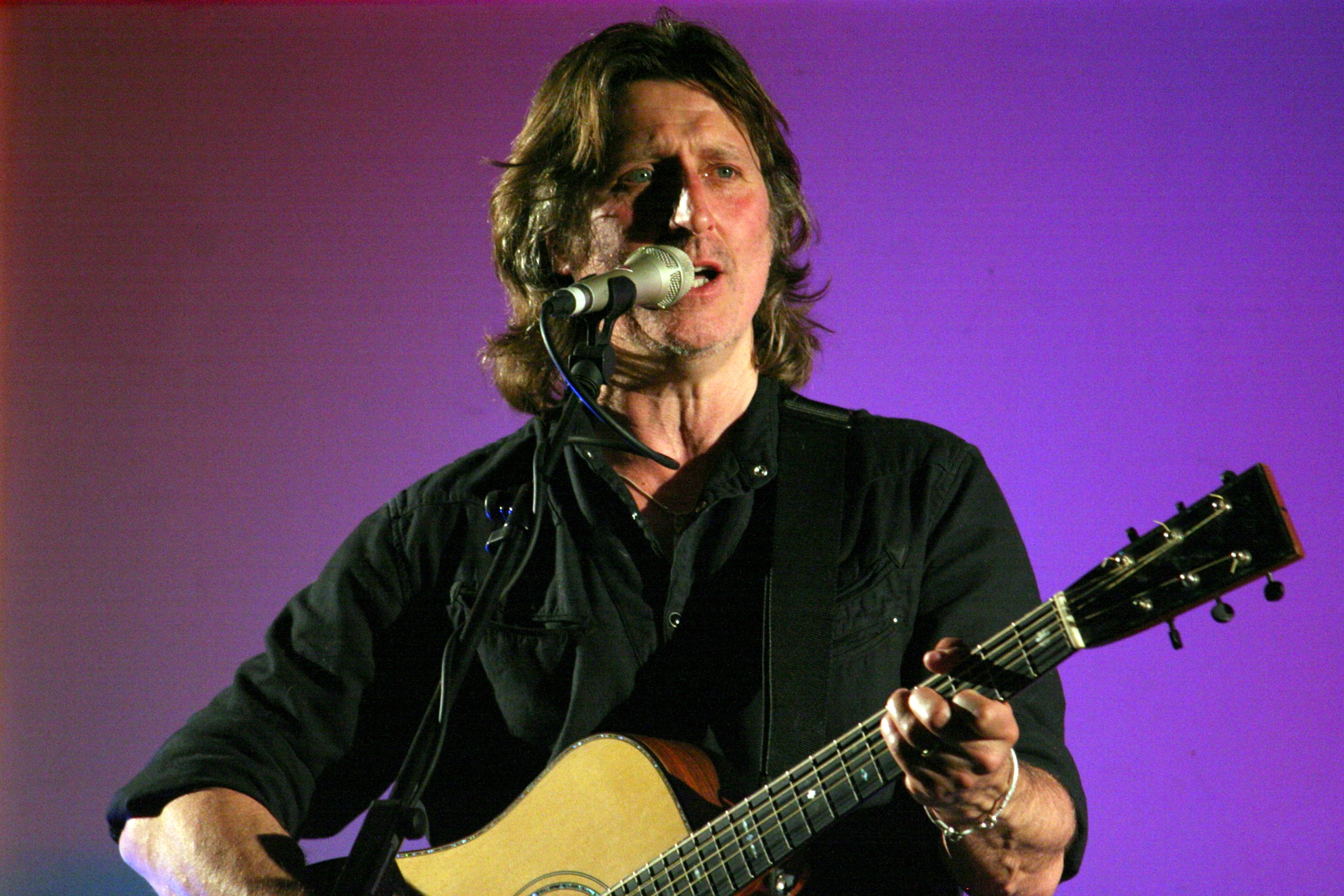
Steve Knightley of the duo (pictured in 2009) found the album successfully connected them to their roots.

The album was released by the duo's own label Hands on Music in late 1998 as a limited edition. It was only ever made available via post order and at the band's concerts, and only for a short time. The unusual release meant that the album was not reviewed by any professional music critics. Nonetheless, the duo said that the concept "to connect them to their roots" worked well.

The duo were not quick to follow the album with another album of the duo's own material. They followed Folk Music with an album of re-recordings of their old material, Anglicana (1999), and an album of contemporary cover versions, Covers (2000), before returning to recording an album of new material with Cold Frontier (2001). During 1999, the duo also undertook solo projects, including Knightley's solo album Track of Words and Beer's projects Ridgeriders and The Fiddle Collection.

The tenth song, "The Train"/"Blackwaterside", was featured on the band's 2007 compilation album Roots: The Best of Show of Hands, becoming the first time music from the album had been available in some eight to nine years. In February 2015, after sixteen years of unavailability, the band re-released Folk Music as a free download to anyone who subscribed to their mailing list.

== Track listing ==
All tracks are traditional arrangements of folk songs by Steve Knightley and Phil Beer, except where noted.

1. “John Riley” – 4:34
2. “Broomfield Hill” – 2:38
3. “All Things Are Quite Silent” – 1:51
4. “Lonesome Stockade Blues” – 4:04
5. “Mary From Dungloe” (arr. Beer) – 3:13
6. “Down In Yon Forest” – 3:37
7. “je ne sais quoi” (Steve Knightley) / “le boeuf anglais” (Gareth Turner) – 1:56
8. “Digging Down” (lyrics by Mark Glover) – 1:49
9. “Matt Hyland” – 3:28
10. “The Train” (Steve Knightley) / “Blackwaterside” – 6:50
11. Hidden track (version of "High Germany") – 2:22

== Personnel ==
- Steve Knightley
- Phil Beer
