= Martyn Joseph =

Welsh musical artist (born 1960)

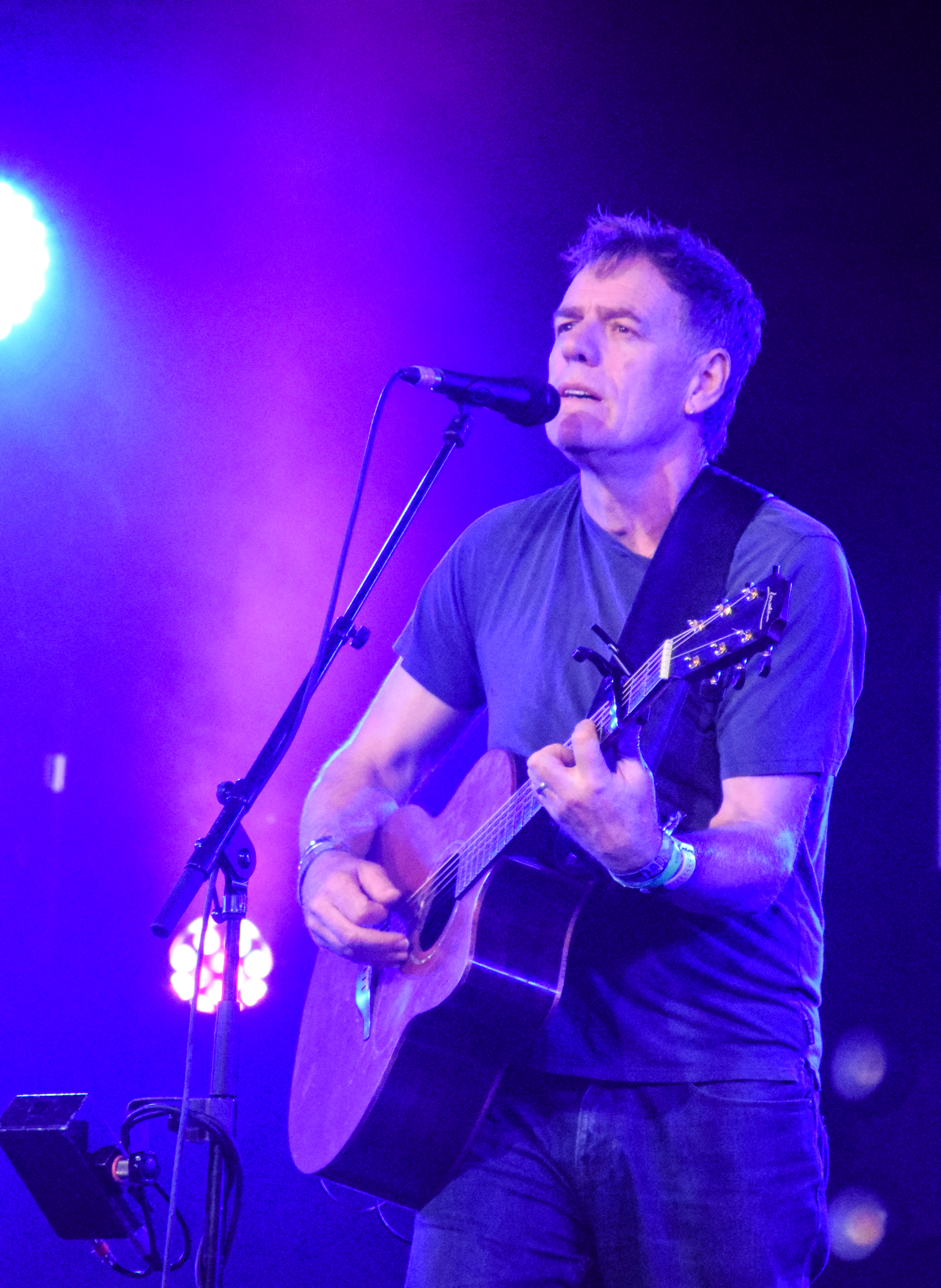
- Performing at Towersey Festival 2018

Background information
- Born: 15 July 1960 (age 66); Penarth, Wales
- Genres: Folk, Celtic
- Occupations: Musician, singer-songwriter
- Instruments: Guitar, harmonica
- Years active: 1983–present
- Label: Pipe,
- Website: martynjoseph.net

Martyn Joseph (born 15 July 1960) is a Welsh singer-songwriter whose music exhibits primarily a brand of Celtic and folk, while his songwriting is often focussed on social lament or protest. From independently releasing his first studio release, I'm Only Beginning, in 1983, Joseph's career has spanned forty years. In 2004, he won the Best Male Artist Category in the BBC Welsh Music Awards.

== Early life ==
Born in Penarth, Wales, Joseph grew up as an avid golfer, having started to play at the age of 10. At 15 years old, he was playing off a handicap of one, and at 17, he became the youngest ever winner of the Glamorganshire Golf Club Championship. He has won that title four times and also played for the County of Glamorgan and in the British Youths and Amateur Championships in the 1980s. Joseph remains a keen amateur golfer and plays with a handicap of four. However, Joseph would gradually focus his career path on music. Growing up, he participated in school eisteddfods and, at his own estimate, he had already written several songs by his early teens.

== Recording career ==
=== Early career (1983–1998) ===
Joseph began recording in 1983, releasing five albums in the 1980s, culminating in his 1989 self-financed An Aching and a Longing (Myrrh Records), which sold 30,000 copies and gained him a large enough following that he was subsequently signed to Sony Records. He made his major label debut with Being There in 1992. It was produced by Ben Wisch, to create more stripped-down arrangements. Joseph worked musically with Pete Brookes, while collaborating with lyricist Stewart Henderson on many of the tracks. A year after the release of Being There, Joseph recorded live versions of the songs featured on the album and released it under the title Undrugged.

His second and final release under Sony, the self-titled Martyn Joseph, was produced by Mick Glossop, whose previous work included albums with The Waterboys. The first single from Martyn Joseph, "Talk About It in the Morning" co-written with Tom Robinson, was released in 1995 and reached the Top 50 in the UK Singles Chart.

Joseph's brief major label career produced four UK Top 75 singles total in the UK, including "Dolphins Make Me Cry (No. 34)", "Working Mother (No. 65)", "Please Sir (No. 43)" and "Talk About it in The Morning (No. 45)" Prior to 2003's Whoever It Was That Brought Me Here Will Have To Take Me Home, Being There and Martyn Joseph were the only albums of his to have been released in the United States.

After being dropped by Sony, he recorded two albums for the UK independent record label Grapevine: Full Colour Black and White and Tangled Souls. His first release under Grapevine featured the fourth track "Ballad of Richard Lewis", a homage to the Welsh labourer and hero better known as Dic Penderyn, who was sentenced to death after leading the Merthyr Rising of 1831. The song would be later included in further albums (including the Thunder and Rainbows compilation, the Don't Talk About Love live album, and Evolved, as a re-recording in a different style) as "Dic Penderyn".

=== Pipe Records (1999–present) ===
In 1999, Joseph established his own label, Pipe Records, citing "creative freedom" and "complete control" as the main advantages granted him that were not possible working under other labels. Drawing from possible past experiences with Sony, Joseph stated, "I'm not dependent on Robbie Williams' diary or Madonna's film schedule for when [my songs] get released." Joseph began publishing work under a new medium, a news magazine entitled The Passport Queue, the name of which was taken from a line in the song "Everything in Heaven". Subscribers of the magazine receive free annual CDs of rare recordings.

In his first release under Pipe Records, Far From Silent, Joseph explored the complications of fame and fortune in the second track "Celebrity". The eighth track, entitled "The Good in Me is Dead", written from the perspective of a Kosovo refugee in light of the Balkan atrocities, reflects Joseph's penchant for writing about social tragedies and injustice. "The prime motive in the instant that I pick up the guitar is a selfish one," Joseph says. "It's because I need to deal with the world. I'm in the world and it's horrible, and what can I do? I'm just getting this stuff out of my system as it were."

Between Far From Silent and his next LP, Joseph came out with several works, the first of which was a 2000 limited edition EP, The Shirley Sessions, which he worked on primarily during a tour with Shirley Bassey gone awry. The next year, in 2001, Joseph compiled a two-disc best-of album entitled Thunder and Rainbows – The Best We Could Find comprising 31 of his previous favourites and two new songs. Following his first best-of compilation, he came out with his second live album, two volumes of recordings under the title Don't Talk About Love 1992 – 2002.

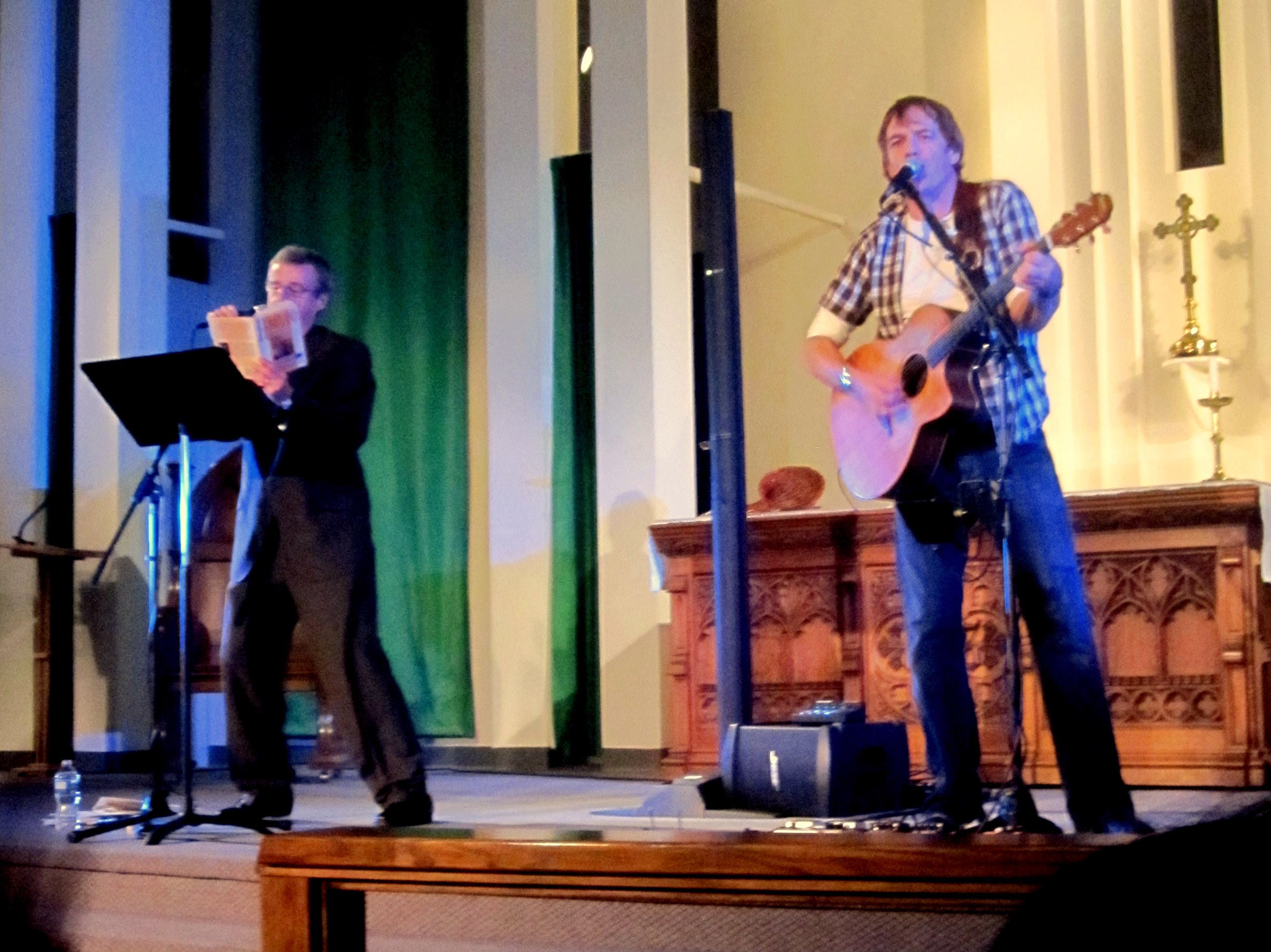
Joseph performing live with lyricist Stewart Henderson.

In November 2003, Joseph released his second LP under Pipe Records, Whoever It Was That Brought Me Here Will Have To Take Me Home. Soon thereafter, Joseph began a serious collaboration with Tom Robinson and Steve Knightley, whom he worked with extensively early in his career. The result was the 2004 release, Faith, Folk and Anarchy, as well as an eventual live accompaniment, Faith, Folk & Anarchy Live. The next year brought three more releases from Joseph. In the midst of the controversial war in Iraq, Joseph's next album, Deep Blue, featured the highly political tracks "Yet Still This Will Not Be" and "How Did We End Up Here". Joseph mused in an interview with a folk music website, "I bet, in his private moments alone, deep down, Tony Blair the person regrets what he did in Iraq". The Bridgerow Sessions and Because We Can..., further collaborated on with Steve Knightley and Stewart Henderson respectively, rounded out the year.

A regular performer at the annual Greenbelt Festival in the United Kingdom, Joseph recorded his 2006 performance and released it as MJGB06. The same year, he came out with his first live effort recorded on DVD, Martyn Joseph Live. A two-day stint in Las Vegas would precede his following LP released in 2007 and would prove to be highly influential, inspiring the album's title, Vegas, and its title-track. Another track on the album, "Kindness", was, on the other hand, inspired by the homeless situation in Toronto, Ontario. The album exhibited a generally edgier sound, featuring electric guitar.

In October 2008, Joseph released Evolved, an album featuring 14 newly recorded tracks of songs in Joseph's previous catalogue, but played in a different style to their original recordings. He felt that the songs found in his albums no longer reflected the manner in which he played them live. The songs were uniquely presented exactly as Joseph played them in studio without any overdubbing or additional instrumentation.

In January 2009, at the height of the Israeli attack on Gaza, Joseph released "Five Sisters", a track paying homage to the five sisters who were killed by an Israeli shell supposedly meant to hit a mosque. Later that year, Joseph released another live album entitled Official Bootleg Series – Volume 1 – Live Cuts 92–08. As the title suggests, the album compiled an assortment of official bootlegs spanning performances from 1992 to 2008. During a 31-date tour of the United Kingdom, beginning in October 2010, Joseph's performances were recorded for a future live DVD release.

Joseph later released Under Lemonade Skies, a 10-track LP.

== Touring ==
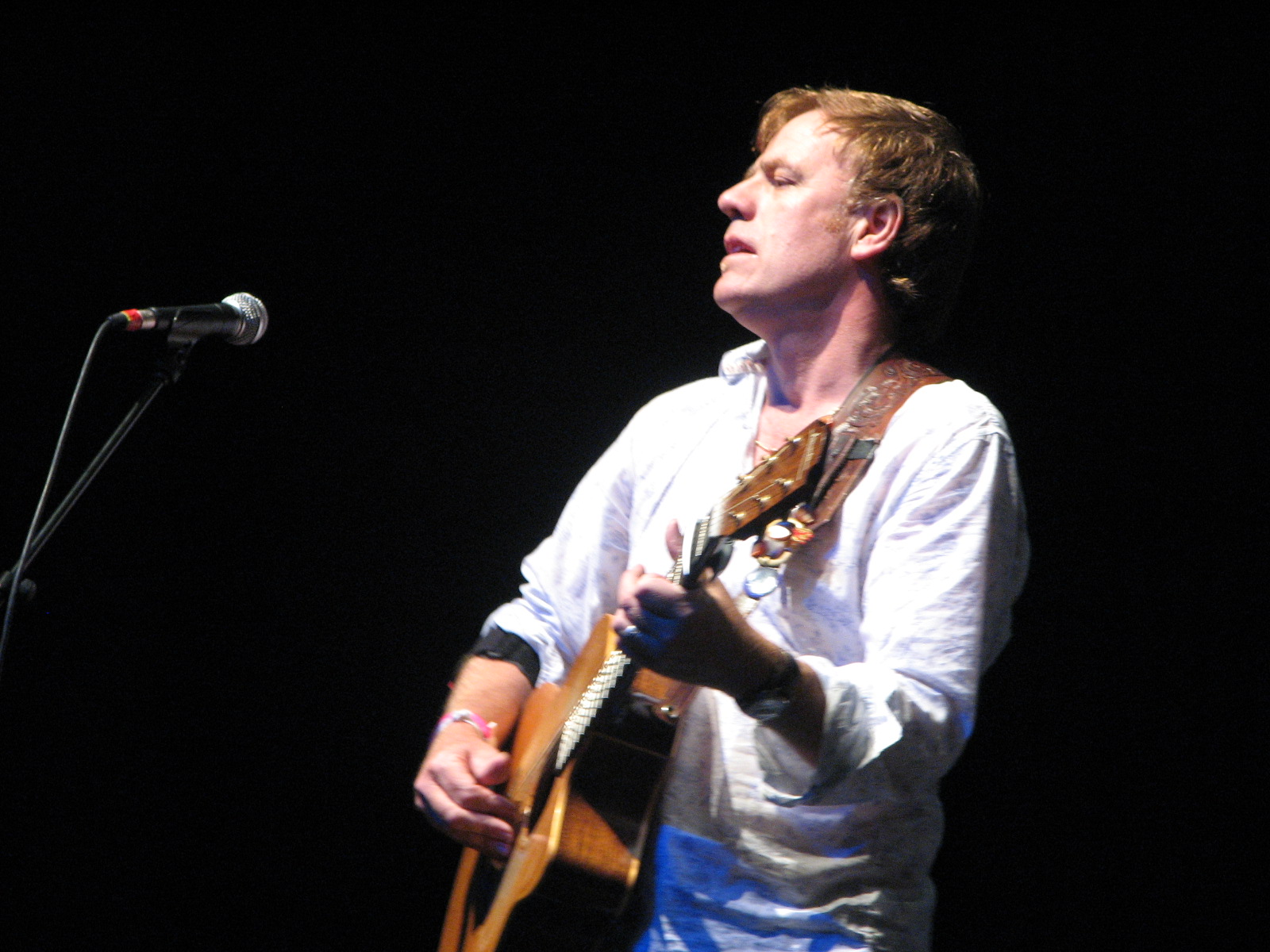
Performing at Greenbelt Festival 2008

Joseph tours as a solo artist in the UK, and in the early 2000s he began touring in Canada and the United States. One of his songs, "All This Time" was borne of a trip through the Canadian wilderness. Of the track's inspiration, Joseph explains, "It humbles you visiting a place like that. Anyone who has an ego problem needs to backpack through Canada for a while." He is also a regular performer at major Canadian folk festivals, including the Vancouver and Edmonton Folk Music Festivals, and at the annual Greenbelt Festival in the UK.

Joseph has performed as a support act for a variety of artists, such as Chris de Burgh, Marc Cohn, Joan Armatrading, Art Garfunkel, Janis Ian, and Suzanne Vega. In June 2000, he left a tour with Shirley Bassey after only eight shows over what he described as "rather obvious artistic differences". Prior to the tour, he admitted in an interview with Cross Rhythms, "I've heard that she can be difficult...I figure that [my songs will] paint a slightly different picture to the one she will probably paint so I guess it's a sense of balance, it's a challenge." Having unexpected time on his hands, he recorded an EP entitled The Shirley Sessions, which consisted of several songs written during the tour.

In his early career, he experimented with an accompanied arrangement in his live shows, having been assigned drummer Pete Thomas from the Attractions by his Sony label.

== Activism ==
Spanning his musical career, Joseph has campaigned for causes. Asked in an interview whether he considered himself primarily a musician or activist, Joseph replied, "I can't decide ... I guess it's all part and parcel of the same thing for me." Focusing his attention towards trade justice, third world debt cancellation and human rights, Joseph has been involved with Brazil's MST (Movimento dos Trabalhadores Sem Terra), Amnesty International, Christian Aid, Casa Alianza, the Stephen Lewis Foundation, Jubilee 2000 and Advantage Africa.

In May 2004, in the wake of the 2003 invasion of Iraq, Joseph released a five-track EP, The Great American Novel, with all proceeds designated to War Child. He worked on the recording with regular collaborators Tom Robinson and Steve Knightley.

In 2014 he launched his "Let Yourself Trust", a not-for-profit organisation which aims to challenge what he perceives to be injustice, educating via advocacy, campaigning for human rights, and raising issues otherwise ignored.

== Awards ==
BBC Welsh Music Awards

- Best Male Artist, 2004

2018 Folk Alliance International Awards

- Spirit of Folk Award

2019 Wales Music Awards

- Best English Language Song - Here Come The Young

== Discography ==
=== Studio albums ===
- I'm Only Beginning (1983)
- Nobody's Fool (1984)
- Sold Out (1985)
- Ballads...In Quieter Moments (1987)
- Treasure the Questions (1988)
- Being There (1992)
- Martyn Joseph (1995)
- Full Colour Black And White (1996)
- Tangled Souls (1998)
- Far From Silent (1999)
- Whoever It Was That Brought Me Here Will Have To Take Me Home (2003)
- Run to Cover (2004)
- Deep Blue (2005)
- Vegas (September 2007)
- Evolved (October 2008)
- Under Lemonade Skies (October 2010)
- Broken Peace (October 2010)
- Songs for the Coming Home (October 2012)
- Tires Rushing By in the Rain (October 2013)
- Kiss The World Beautiful - Songs for the Let Yourself Trust (June 2014)
- Sanctuary (October 2015)
- Sanctuary Acoustic (May 2016)
- Here Come The Young (January 2019)
- Days Of Decision: A Tribute to Phil Ochs (January 2020)
- 1960 (November 2021)
- 1960 Acoustic (November 2022) (Includes Live DVD)
- This Is What I Want To Say (January 2024)
- Troubled Horses (November 2025)
- Revolved & Evolved (November 2026)

=== Live albums ===
- An Aching and a Longing (1989)
- Undrugged/Being There (1993)
- Live at St. David's Hall Cardiff (1995) (free for new members of artist's fan mag)
- Don't Talk About Love 1992 – 2002 (Volume 1, 2001)
- Don't Talk About Love 1992 – 2002 (Volume 2, 2002)
- Faith, Folk & Anarchy Live (2004)
- Live in Toronto (2006) (available as an mp3 download only from artist website)
- Martyn Joseph Live (2006, DVD)
- MJGB06 – Live Greenbelt 2006 (2007)
- Official Bootleg Series – Vol 1 – Live Cuts 92-08 (2009)
- Live at the Brook – 07.11.10 – Official bootleg – Vol 2 (2011)
- Live in Hansbeke, Belgium – May 2013 – Official bootleg – Vol 3 (2014)
- Live in Derby, England - 2017 - Official Bootleg - Vol 4 (2017)
- Across Germany LIVE (2019) (available as an mp3 download only from artist website)
- Live at St. David's Hall - Cardiff 7/2/23 (2023)

=== Compilations ===
- Thunder and Rainbows – The Best We Could Find: 1988–2000 (Two-disc, 2000)

=== EPs ===
- The Shirley Sessions (2000)
- The Great American Novel (2003)
- When We Get Through This (2020)
- Chapel Porth Beach (2024)

=== Collaborations ===
- Faith, Folk, And Anarchy (2004, with Tom Robinson & Steve Knightley)
- The Bridgerow Sessions (2005, with Steve Knightley)
- Because We Can... (2005, music and poetry recorded with Stewart Henderson)
- Because We Can...Again (2009, music and poetry recorded with Stewart Henderson)
- Kiss The World Beautiful - Vol. II (2019)
