= Show of Hands =

English acoustic roots/folk duo

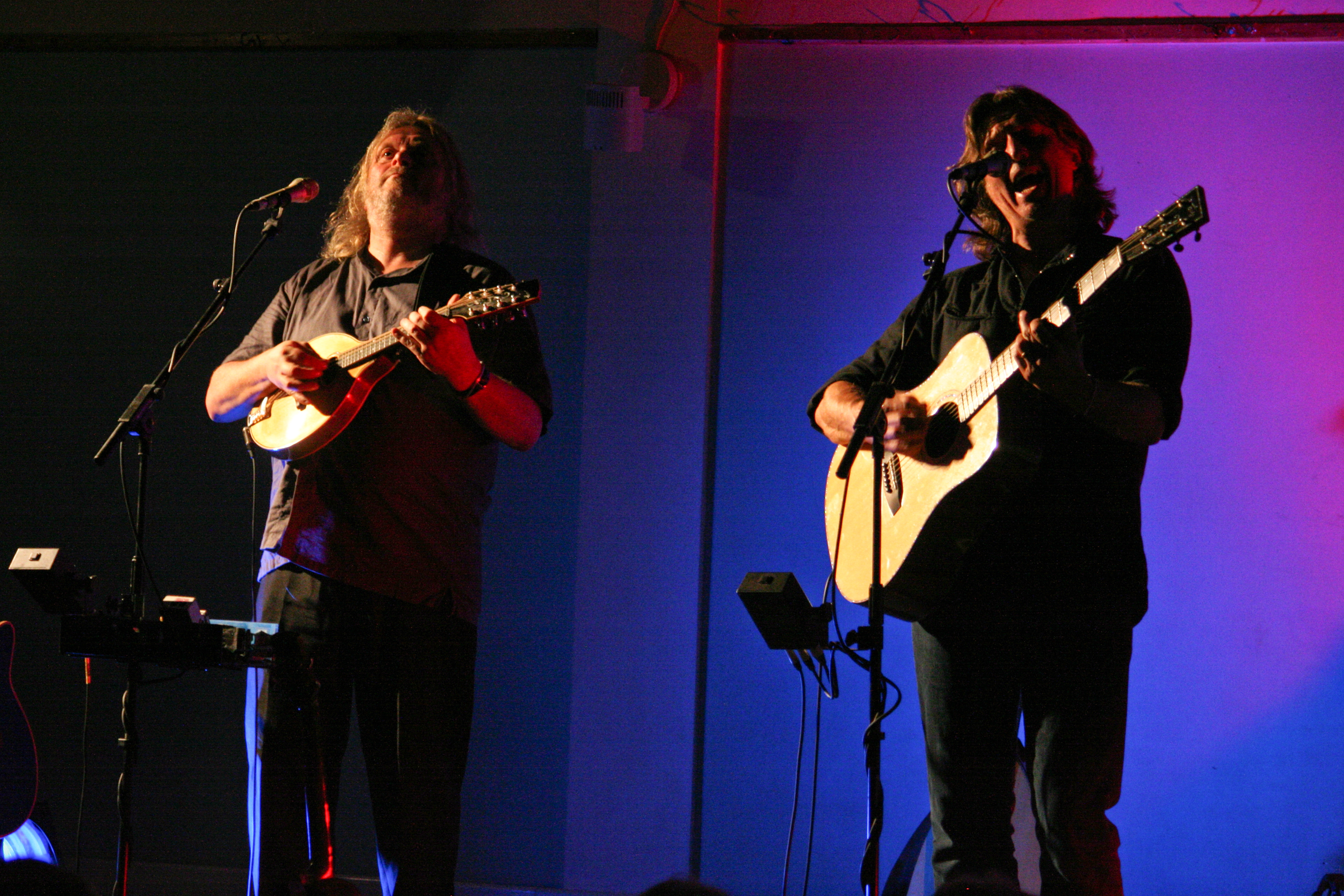
- Show of Hands performing at Harberton, Devon in 2009 (photo: Brian Marks)

Background information
- Origin: Devon, England
- Genres: Roots, folk, acoustic
- Years active: 1987–2024
- Label: Hands On
- Members: Steve Knightley; Phil Beer; Miranda Sykes; Cormac Byrne
- Website: showofhands.co.uk

Show of Hands is an English acoustic roots/folk duo formed in 1986 by singer-songwriter Steve Knightley (guitars, mandolin, mandocello, cuatro) and composer and multi-instrumentalist Phil Beer (vocals, guitars, violin, viola, mandolin, mandocello). Joined by singer and double-bassist Miranda Sykes for a tour in 2004, Show of Hands continued to regularly perform as a trio with Sykes, as well as in their original format. The line-up was further expanded in 2019 by the addition of Irish percussionist Cormac Byrne. As of 2024 the band are on hiatus.

Known for their songs with rousing choruses that address contemporary social issues, (notably their "singalong attack on the bankers," Arrogance Ignorance and Greed) these often illustrate current concerns through historical narratives and have earned Knightley the label the 'Gravel voiced spokesman of the rural poor'. Rooted in English traditional music the songs are shot through with diverse influences from music across the world, including the blues, Americana, and Latin rhythms. Nominating Knightley as 'songwriter of the '90s,' Tom Robinson of BBC Radio 6 noted that the songs spring from "the soil of the West Country," where, as Robin Denselow writes in the Guardian, "Beer and Knightley have become folk heroes".

Widely recognised as pioneers in the folk/roots arena, both for their enduring emphasis on stagecraft and their radical business model, Show of Hands are noted for the high level of professionalism they bring to their performances, whether in a small club or the Royal Albert Hall. Their "much vaunted cottage industry," set up Show of Hands as an independent concern before the internet made this common practice. Beer and Knightley, with their then manager, Gerard O'Farrell, built on their close relationship with their growing and "devoted" fanbase to create a completely self-contained way of working. This included their record label and production company Hands On Music, that gave them control of their consistently 'classy' output.

Show of Hands have received widespread critical acclaim over their 30 album (and continuing) career, and in 2006 were voted "Greatest Devonians Ever" in a poll run by Devon Country Council beating Sir Francis Drake, Agatha Christie and Chris Martin amongst others to the title.

== History ==
1980s: The beginning

Offered a gig at the Wimborne Festival in 1986, Steve Knightley called on his old friends Warwick Downes (double bass) and Martin Bradley (concertina) to join him. They performed as Show of Hands, a name chosen by Knightley who liked its democratic implications. Another of Knightley's old friends, Phil Beer, resided in the audience. Impressed by the quality of Knightley's self-penned songs (Exile in particular), Beer suggested they form a duo and offered to try and get them some gigs.

The pair had first met in the early 70's when both were in their early teens and performing on the thriving Devon folk circuit. Beer was gigging extensively with Colin Wilson (guitar) in their duo 'Odd Folk'. Knightley, in 'Gawain', was working his way through the Penguin Book of English Folk Songs, with Paul Downes (Warwick's brother) on guitar and John 'Bat' Evans on fiddle. At this time Knightley began experimenting with writing his own songs.

Relocating to Coventry to study politics and history at Lanchester Polytechnic College, Knightley started a folk club there. Beer and Downes, gigging as a duo were frequent visitors. Continuing his studies at Sussex University, Knightley formed a duo with Warwick Downes, during which time he penned his narrative folk 'opera' Tall Ships. This he later performed on Richard Digance's Capital Radio show, with his then neighbour, the actor Jim Carter (who plays Mr Carson in Downton Abbey) reading the opening poem, 'The Wrecker's Prayer'.

Throughout the late 1970s and early 1980s Beer and Knightley would stand in as needed in each other's bands when they were playing in London. Here Knightley "stormed the indie rock circuit" In four bands The Cheats', 'Total Strangers', 'Short Stories' and 'The West' and Beer gigged with folk legends Johnny Coppin, Ashley Hutchings' The Albion Band, Mike Oldfield and his own 'The Arizona Smoke Revue'.

In 1986, Knightley moved to rural Dorset with his first wife Simone to run the remote 'Catsley House' as a whole-food guest-house. Here, in January 1987, following their fateful Wimborne Festival meeting, Beer and Knightley set up in a studio above the garage to record the songs that as Show of Hands they were now honing live.

Their first release, Show of Hands (on cassette only), sold out over the course of their live shows. Playing every gig on the folk circuit they knew well from their teenage years, they realised that audiences tend to favour familiarity over novelty. So, the pair initially slipped original songs into a set of folk standards. But by the end of the decade the folk standards barely featured in their shows. This is testimony to Knightley's ability to write original songs that become instant classics. For instance, The Galway Farmer has appeared in at least one list of traditional Irish tunes though Knightley wrote it in 1994.

=== 1990s ===
1990s: Sowing the seeds of a 'grass-roots' phenomenon

Show of Hands kicked off the 1990s with the release of Tall Ships. Again, on cassette only and recorded at the Catsley House home studio, it featured the recording of Knightley's epic folk-suite that had first aired on Capital Radio. This too sold out at gigs.

Taken on in 1991 by local agent Peter Wilson, he secured bookings for the duo in hundreds of venues up and down the South Coast. Here in the dockers' and bikers' pubs Show of Hands learnt how to successfully compete with the darts and the TV to grow a loyal audience beyond their usual folk crowd.

Knightley's years performing in tough London pubs and bars and Beer's folk/rock experience of venues throughout Europe began to pay off. "We were playing loud and hard. People would still be clapping, and we'd be already counting in the next tune. Sometimes we'd have to tone it down a touch in the folk clubs, but it was great grounding for festival gigs." 'Nailing it' live, Show of Hands were building firm foundations for their famously close relationship with their audience as the 1990s dawned. And in 1991, as their gigging schedule became increasingly hectic, Beer left 'The Albion Band' to concentrate full-time on Show of Hands.

Out for the Count, also on cassette, followed the same year. Recorded at Beer's Old Court Studio in Gloucestershire, it again quickly sold out at gigs. Displaying their trust in the people who came to see them, Show of Hands would simply put the cassettes in a tub and say: "If you'd like one, take one, but bung in a fiver."

Early collaboration

A chance call from Roger Watson from the Southern Arts Development Project (TAPS) in 1992 resulted in Beer and Knightley's collaboration with three exiled Chilean musicians. Together with Dave Townsend on fiddle and concertina, they joined Sergio Avila, Mauricio Venegas and Vladimir Vega to create the band 'Alianza'.

Working with the Chileans on the 'Alianza' tour and album of the same name had a profound impact on Beer and Knightley. Whilst informing their rhythmic language and musical sensibility, it also inspired them to add the cuatro to their repertoire. The Chileans' awareness of music's power to educate and inform (and the risks that they took to perform it), hit home with Beer and Knightley. "In our society people can make political statements in song and no one will threaten you. But for them, just getting together and playing ordinary folk songs (meant) risking arrest, imprisonment and exile."

First CD releases

Beer and Knightley continued performing as Show of Hands whilst also touring with 'Alianza' and in June 1992 their performance at the Bull's Head in Bridport was recorded live by Mike Trim who'd signed the duo to his RGF record label. Show of Hands Live '92 was their first CD release. It secured them slots on the following year's festival circuit and a 60-date tour support with Ralph McTell.

Where the 'Alianza' tour had introduced Beer and Knightley to arts centre audiences in the South of England, the gigs with McTell took them to large theatre audiences across the country. McTell advised them to "stop doing endless gigs," to group them into coherent touring periods underpinned by a concept – and with a new record to promote!

In January 1994, Show of Hands recorded Beat About the Bush (Isis records 1994, Hands On Music 1999), in Wytherstone Studios, West Dorset, again produced by Mike Trim. Released in February, the album featured a large line-up of guest musicians, including a rhythm section that the prevailing wisdom deemed necessary for a more radio friendly sound.

A new business model

The Beat About The Bush tour took in over a hundred gigs from Land's End to the Scottish Borders. Halfway through, Australian maverick and musician Gerard O'Farrell joined as sound engineer. Realising that the normal music business practice involving agents, fixed fees and using house PAs at each gig wasn't doing the band or the venues any favours, O'Farrell took up the reins as manager and agent. With Beer and Knightley, he set up a new business model that was to become a template for musicians everywhere.

Show of Hands would book the gigs in-house, turn up with their own PA and lighting system and even provide their own rider. They'd refuse a fee and instead take a percentage of the door. All the venue had to do was sell the tickets. In taking on the financial risk, Show of Hands avoided possibly antagonistic relationships with the venues and also empowered a host of music-loving amateur promoters, many of whom have built careers booking major artists in large concert venues.

Forming a close-knit expert touring team, they also removed the anxieties of potentially poor sound and inadequate lighting. Show of Hands would take typical folk performances to a new level, ensuring a professional performance scenario that both they and their audiences could rely on.

As the band continued to build up their grass-roots fan base and growing a mailing list that received news of their forthcoming gigs, their 'cottage industry' approach began to pay off.

In 1996, O'Farrell, Beer and Knightley set up the label 'Hands On Music', to take care of Show of Hands' recording, distribution and publishing needs. From the outset, O'Farrell and Hands On Music bucked the trend in usual music business practice by positively applauding music sharing in line with the available technology.

A newsletter went out in 1997 encouraging the copying of albums onto cassette and handing them out to friends. Later, after a crash course to learn all things internet, O'Farrell set up the band's website, made Show of Hands' music and footage freely available and gave downloading a hearty thumbs up.

In 2001 O'Farrell returned with his family to Australia where he continued to run the website. Vaughan Pearce, then in charge of the band's merchandising, took on the role of manager. He would focus on the agency side of the business, whilst his wife Gwen, a former major record company executive, would soon join him to run the Hands On Music label. A deal with Proper in 2001 ensured mainstream distribution for Show of Hands releases.

International gigs

Throughout the 1990s the duo performed in Australia, Hong Kong, the US, Canada, Indonesia and India – experiences that opened their ears to yet more instrumental textures and songwriting themes. Under Vaughan and Gwen's steady stewardship the duo re-focused their attention on their British audiences and their festival and concert profile grew accordingly.

"A formidable partnership"

1994 saw the release of Show of Hands first compilation album. Favourite tracks from the first three cassettes were repackaged on CD: Backlog 1987–1991. (Isis 1994)

Demonstrating their commitment to their audience and to music itself, Show of Hands embarked on their first 'workshop tour' in February 1995. In this they shared their experience of composing, performing and the music business with fans and fellow musicians alike.

In amongst festival gigs, and before performing to 18,000 at Copredy in August, Show of Hands recorded their next studio album Lie of the Land (Isis 1995, Hands On Music 1996). O'Farrell producing, plugged the instruments straight into the desk to capture a pared down 'live' sound. Released in October 1995, the album received 4-stars and a 'startlingly good' from Q, becoming their folk record of the year in '96. Mojo said the album created "a powerful, fresh sounding music with both integrity and widespread appeal" whilst The Telegraph was moved to mention Show of Hands' "formidable partnership".

Lie of the Land's album cover by Rob O'Connor beautifully underpinned the band's connection with their rural roots whilst setting the bar high for the look of the growing Show of Hands 'brand'. An old friend from Knightley's Coventry days, O'Connor had taken on the duo's various design requirements since producing the artwork for their debut CD Show of Hands Live. O'Connor's graphic design company 'Stylorouge' became world-famous for its award-winning work, and his design aesthetic espouses Show of Hands' reputation for high quality in every aspect of their output.

Selling out the Royal Albert Hall

Despite their increasing critical acclaim and burgeoning fan base, in the mid-1990s Show of Hands were finding gigs in the capital hard to come by. With the help of software designer Richard Patterson and festival organiser Steve Heap their solution was to book the Royal Albert Hall for a gig on 24 March 1996. This secured them mainstream media coverage, including an interview on Richard and Judy's morning TV show and news features on Sky News and BBC TV.

Against the odds, (and the expectations of the RAH management), the show sold out. Show of Hands' fans turned up from all over the country. That year, Sue Morley and friends set up a formal fan club, with an internet forum 'Longdogs' (the name taken from the Show of Hands' song) following in 1998.

As of April 2023 the band has returned six times to the iconic London venue, (including on 8 April 2007, with their third performance there celebrating 15 years together), performing to large crowds on each occasion. Each show at the RAH celebrates the previous five years of musical collaborations and features appearances from musician friends. Guests have included established names such as Ralph McTell, Johnnie Jones, Tom Robinson, Martyn Joseph and American singer-songwriter, Richard Shindell.

The Albert Hall shows have also given a platform to newcomers such as Jackie Oates, Phillip Henry & Hannah Martin, Jenna Witts and in 2001, making their first major public appearance, Port Isaac's Fisherman's Friends. Carlton Television filmed the 2001 show for a live music 'special' and Knightley proposed (to Clare, now his wife) from the stage.

A recording of their debut RAH gig, Live at the Royal Albert Hall swiftly became their best-selling album to that date. It was released on CD in August 1996 on Show of Hands' own Hands On Music.

Paying it forward

As well as carrying on with sharing their music for free, Show of Hands also continue to share their expertise in workshop tours across the world and to give new acts a break by booking them as their supporting artists. By warmly introducing their guest artists themselves at each gig, and including them in a spot in their performance, Show of Hands aim to ensure that new artists are taken to heart by their audiences.

Their Five Days in May tour in 1997 featured Kate Rusby on her first major solo venture. The tour culminated with a show at the Shepherds Bush Empire. Both separately and as Show of Hands Knightley and Beer continue to mentor and give touring opportunities to new artists, including Seth Lakeman, Jenna Witts, Jackie Oates, Megan Henwood, India Electric Company, Jim Causley, and Phillip Henry & Hannah Martin. Knightley has gone on to collaborate with Lakeman and their co-written Haunt You opened Show of Hands 2012 album, Wake the Union.

End of the 1990s

Filming for a full-length feature documentary on Show of Hands began in February 1997. Called Stairway to Devon and directed by Rob O'Connor, it includes Show of Hands' appearance at Glastonbury that year.

The album Dark Fields was recorded in Cornwall and released in December 1997, (Hands On Music) following Show of Hands' first single release Crazy Boy (Hands On Music), earlier in the Autumn. It featured songs by Knightley rooted in the area, including the notable Cornish diaspora anthem Cousin Jack – an 'instant classic' that is now taught in schools throughout the Duchy and remains a popular live number.

Celebrating the music that had inspired them in the first place, Show of Hands released Folk Music (Hands On Music) in 1998, an album of traditional songs and a reworking of Knightley's composition The Train/Blackwater Side in traditional English style. That year also saw the debut of the band's annual Abbotsbury Festival, a day featuring performances by Show of Hands and illustrious guest artists in the Dorset town's lush Sub-Tropical Garden.

=== 2000s ===
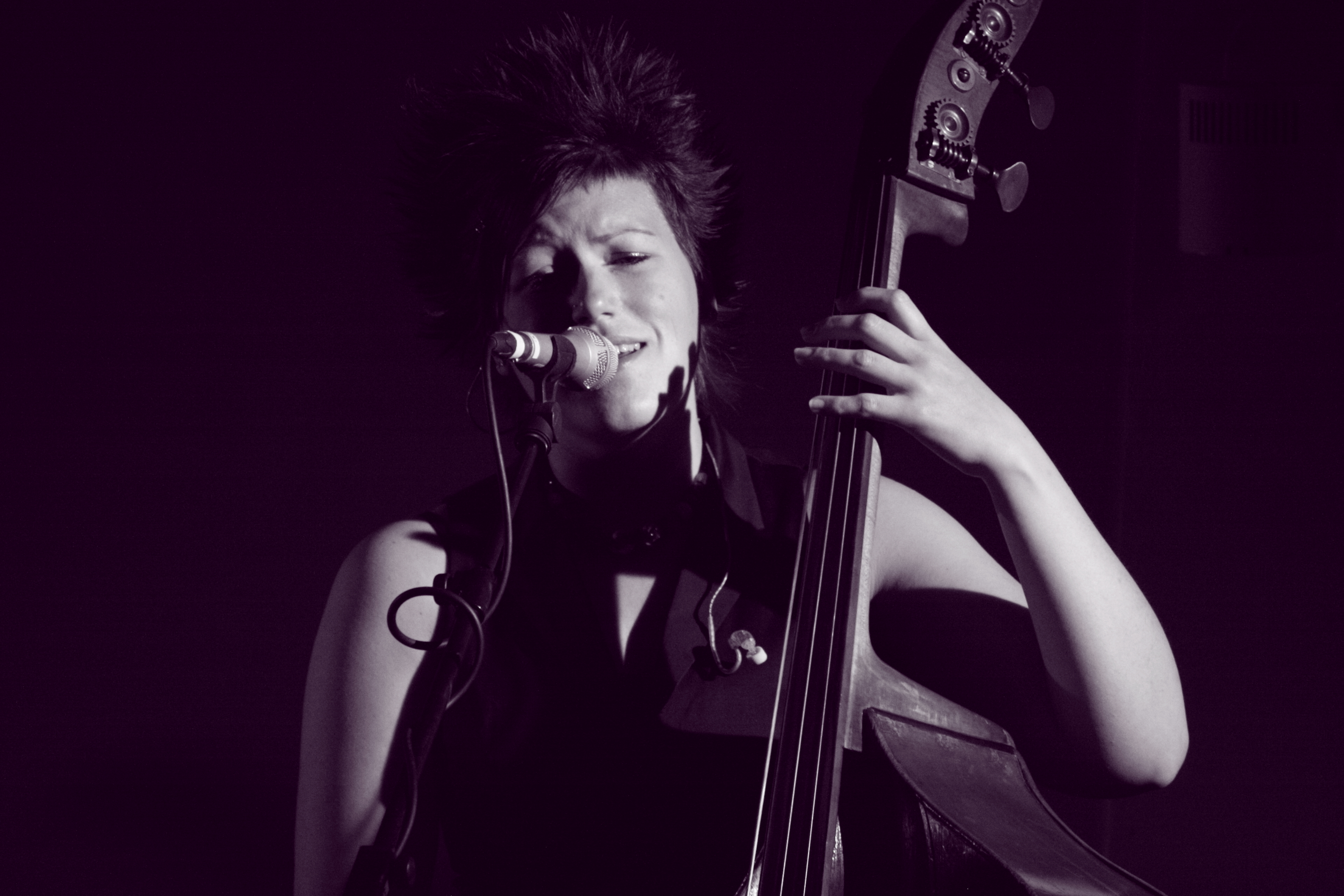
Miranda Sykes at Harberton Village Hall in 2009 (photo: Brian Marks)

==== Recognition and mainstream success ====
As the millennium dawned Show of Hands entered a recording period. First up was Covers (Hands On Music 2000), an album covering songs they loved from genres other than folk. Tracks from artists as diverse as Thom Yorke, Peter Gabriel, Lowell George and Bob Dylan are given a folk inspired nuance.

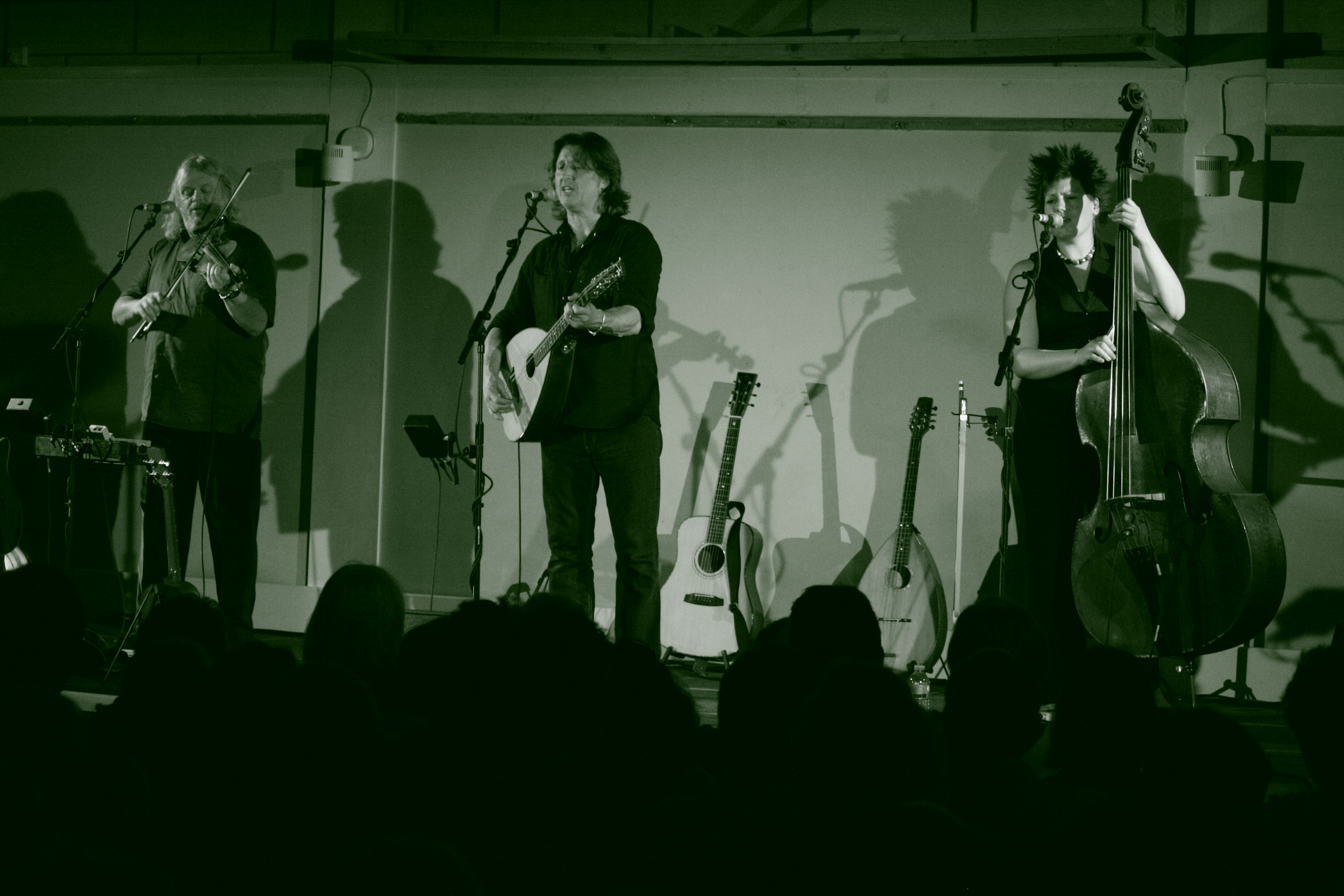
Show of Hands as a trio, in 2009 (photo: Brian Marks)

Next, Cold Frontier, (Hands On Music) in 2001 shows Knightley's 'deft hand' in confronting contemporary issues through historical narrative. Conveyed in memorable songs, such as ''The Flood'' and the title track itself, his call to our common humanity is particularly effective. Cold Frontierwas the first album to be recorded by Mick Dolan, who took responsibility for the Show of Hands sound after producer/manager Gerard O'Farrell returned to his native Australia. At the Cambridge Folk Festival that year, their CD sales outstripped those of every other artist.

2002's Cold Cuts(Hands On Music) features live performances of overlooked songs from Show of Hands' extensive back catalogue, all given new arrangements. Their fresh approach is also applied to covers, including Leonard Cohen's ''First They Take Manhattan.''

The Path, released in 2003 is Show of Hands' first instrumental album. Celebrating the silver jubilee of The South West Path, all the tracks are inspired by and relate to specific places along the famous coastal trail, creating an atmospheric musical portrait of each location. Country Life (Hands On Music) was released in October that same year.

==== The gravel-voiced spokesman of the rural poor ====
Knightley's talent for nailing social issues in song is razor-sharp on ''Country Life'' (Hands On Music 2003). It was not just the title track "an anthem on the bleak realities of rural England" that exposed the harshness of local rural life and the album gained mainstream media acclaim – including from Andrew Marr. It landed Show of Hands a spot on BBC Five Live and Farming Today with Knightley becoming known as 'The gravel-voiced spokesman of the rural poor'. The seamless blend of folk, Latin, Celtic and subtle blues influences fuelled their tagline, 'world music from the West Country' and was labeled a revelation by Uncut magazine

Double bassist and singer Miranda Sykes joined Show of Hands for the ''Country Life'' tour in the Autumn of 2004, featuring on the live double album this spawned – As You Were(Hands On Music). Released in 2005 it comprised 22 tracks recorded at various venues during the autumn tour. Knightley and Beer both assert that her outstanding contribution was transformative. They were no longer a 'blokey duo'. Sykes became the unofficial 'third member' of Show of Hands and from now on the band would perform as a trio as well as the original duo.

=== 2010s and 2020s ===
In 2024, Show of Hands completed their final tour "Full Circle", ending at Exeter Cathedral. The band are now on hiatus.

== Songwriting ==
Due to the demands of the bass, and the sonic possibilities of the third harmony provided by Sykes' "almost ethereal" and "captivating" vocals, Beer and Knightley changed the way they worked. They'd become used to Knightley pitching up with a song and improvising together as they worked on the arrangement during a sound-check. They would then take audience reactions into account as they honed the song during live performances. "

With the bass rooting the chords and more complex vocal harmonies, the arrangements now had to be worked out beforehand. "There had to be," say Beer and Knightley, "less winging it and more structure". Paradoxically both find that the clearly defined structure and the grounding that the bass provides liberates their musical improvisation. Released from having to root a song themselves – and knowing precisely where it's going – frees them to fully explore the musical possibilities in each moment.

As for the songwriting itself, Knightley sees his output as broadly falling into four categories, "the emotional landscape American singer-songwriter approach, the up-tempo Irishy thing, the rural storytelling ballads and the big, angry, shouty sort of songs". In September 2016 he set himself a 'song a week' challenge, writing one of each over the month, which included the new crowd favourite, ''Make The Right Noises.''

Knightley might be inspired by a sound, a phrase, a place, a rhythm or a melody he hears in his head. In true folk tradition he excels in writing songs that are rooted in place yet have universal resonance. Likewise, his historical narratives and folk ballads bring history smack bang into the present with timeless contemporary meaning. Beer's and later Sykes', brilliant musicality bring the themes to life, realising them in an almost filmic way.

Knightley has co-written a number of songs with long-time friend, pianist and producer Matt Clifford. Clifford's close relationship with The Rolling Stones and Mick Jagger in particular led to Beer playing mandolin on the band's Steel Wheels CD and to Knightley playing the guitar and mandocello on Jagger's 2001 solo outing ''Goddess in the Doorway''. Knightley also co-wrote The Dohl Foundation's 2017 single Mother Tongue with Johnny Kalsi (who also recorded with Show of Hands) and writes for folk/reggae band E2 and West Country rock band Willie and the Bandits. Show of Hands also collaborate with the English folk roots and reggae inspired band 'Edward ll.' (Previously known as Edward 2nd. and the Red Hot Polkas).

== Awards and nominations ==
In 2004, Show of Hands won the 'Best Live Act' award at the BBC Radio 2 Folk Awards, the only award voted for by the public.

The following year Show of Hands was nominated for 'Best Duo' whilst the title track on Country Life was nominated for 'Best Original Song'. They were also part of the Oysterband Big Session group that won the 'Best Group' award.

Again, nominated for the BBC Radio 2 Folk Awards Best Duo in 2007, Roots (featured on their album Witness – Hands On Music 2006) was also nominated for Best Original song. Show of Hands was also nominated for Best Duo and Best Live Act in 2008.

2009's "Arrogance, Ignorance and Greed" (Hands On Music) won the award for 'Best Song' at the 2010 BBC2 Folk Awards, with Show of Hands winning 'Best Duo'.

Voted 'Greatest Ever Devonians' in a 2006 competition run by Devon County Council, Show of Hands beat Sir Francis Drake, Agatha Christie, Captain Scott, Muse and Chris Martin amongst others to the title.

=== World music from the West Country ===
It was at the Folk Awards that Beer and Knightley fell into conversation with musician/producer and Afro Celt Sound System co-founder Simon Emmerson. Emmerson, and fellow Afro Celt Simon 'Mass' Massey subsequently brought their huge Afro Celt sample library into play as they produced Witnessreleased in May 2006 (Hands On Music).

Whilst warmly embracing the sensual African rhythms and the world and ambient music influences of the producers, Show of Hands' sound remains unmistakably their own. The world in their 'world music from the West Country' just got a little wider. Witness Show of Hands 9th. studio album was released to critical acclaim: Mojo gave the album four out of five stars, ranking Witness at number 10 on their best folk albums of 2006 list. Whilst music journalist Colin Irwin said that "Steve Knightley's songs have developed such an edge that it's hard to deny them any longer". Becoming the band's best-selling album to date, Witness introduced Show of Hands to a new world music audience. The band went on to play at WOMAD in 2008 and a further 22 festivals that year. WOMAD founder Peter Gabriel called Show of Hands "one of the great English bands".

=== Controversy ===
Featured on Witness, Show of Hands' song "Roots", was released as a single in 2008. A rousing riposte to Kim Howells' 2001 remark "the idea of listening to three Somerset folk singers sounds like hell" (when he had been Under Secretary of State for Culture and Sport), the song calls for a celebration of British culture in all its diversity. However, it was misappropriated by the British National Party (BNP). Beer and Knightley forced the BNP to stop using the track and helped to launch "Folk Against Fascism", giving "Roots" to the movement's eponymous 2010 double album. "Roots" also appeared on the compilation album The Best of British Folk.

Roots: The Best of Show of Hands was also the title of their 2007 double album, the tracks on which were voted for by their fans.

=== "Arrogance, Ignorance and Greed" and mainstream success ===
On the title track of 2009's Arrogance, Ignorance and Greed (Hands On Music 2009), Show of Hands gave voice to the public outrage with bankers and the ensuing crisis. "You're on your yacht/we're on our knees/with your arrogance and ignorance and greed." With Megson's Stuart Hanna producing, his pared-down post-punk aesthetic delivered on the raw immediacy of the album's material.

If Country Life had flagged them up as an 'issues' band, AIG carried those colours, slap bang into the mainstream. The accompanying guerrilla-filmed video features huge images of Beer, Knightley and Sykes performing the song projected high onto the edifices of the city's banks whilst monkey-masked graffiti artists work Banksy style below. It 'went viral' on YouTube.

Both the award-winning title track and others from the album received widespread radio airplay, glowing reviews in the mainstream press (including 4 stars in the Financial Times from David Honigman) and landed Show of Hands a slot on the Andrew Marr Show.

=== Back to basics ===
Whilst AIG garnered mainstream success, Show of Hands' core fans found they missed the familiar smooth production and the subtle metaphors with contemporary meaning in Knightley's historical narratives. Show of Hands responded with Backlog 2 (Hands On Music) in 2011. The double album featured Show of Hands songs from 1991 to 2003 as voted for by their fans via the Longdogs forum. Recorded as if live, it had the immediacy and warmth of a Show of Hands gig. It followed on from 2010s Covers 2 (Hands On Music) release. The album was credited to Show of Hands with Miranda Sykes, the first time Sykes received a leading album credit. Following the album's release, the band toured with Texan guitarist Rodney Branigan. 2010 also saw previously unreleased Show of Hands compositions mostly before 1987 on Beer's box set, Box Set One.

2014's Centenary (Universal Music), featuring instrumental settings of World War 1 poetry, used instrumentation typical of the Edwardian period. Original commemorative songs by Show of Hands met their audience's continuing demand for Knightley's way with a narrative. Centenary entered the 'UK compilation album charts at no. 13 and received widespread acclaim in the mainstream media.

To mark the centenary of the Battle of the Somme, Show of Hands played Centenary live in Exeter Cathedral with Jim Carter and Imelda Staunton reading the poetry. The evening was recorded and released as Centenary Live at Exeter Cathedral in 2016 (Hands On Music).

=== The Long Way Home ===
2016's The Long Way Home, saw a return of Beer and Knightley to their roots. Unlike 2012's American roots inspired 'Wake the Union' described as "where the A303 meets Route 66," The Long Way Home "more Devonian than American", barely detours from the A303. Both albums were produced by the band and long-time Show of Hands fellow traveller, Mark Tucker.

=== Playing live – and for charity ===
With the freedom afforded by their business model and a steadfastly loyal following, Show of Hands can and do play anywhere from village halls to festivals and concert hall bastions of culture. For example, in July 2008 Show of Hands played at the first folk proms concert in the Welsh Proms season in St Davids Hall, Cardiff and in the same month at the Evolve 08 festival in Lodmoor Park, Weymouth, along with Miranda Sykes. Knightley returned to the Trowbridge Village Pump Festival in July 2009 without Beer, due to Beer's sailing at the time. He played songs from his then-new solo album Track of Words – Retraced. Show of Hands returned to the festival in July 2010 with both members. Ships also feature, from Show of Hands' performance on the upper deck of The Phoenix, a three-masted ship that sailed up to Topsham on the High Spring Tide in 2001, to gigs on a Rhine and Danube River Cruise in 2016 and 2017.

Whether appearing as a duo or a trio, Show of Hands continue to feature guest musicians, many of whom guest on their recorded output, like long-term friend and Rolling Stones' session man, Matt Clifford, (keyboards, accordion) and their great friend and mentor Ralph McTell.

Their flexibility in playing live enables them to respond easily to requests for gigs 'in support of...' and Show of Hands have raised money for local causes, such as keeping a rural post-office open, as well as global issues, including those relating to education and health.

=== No Secrets ===
A deluxe, in-depth photographic book No Secrets (Flood Gallery 2017) details Show of Hands' extraordinary career and their prolific output. Told in part in their own words, No Secrets features photographs, artwork and stories made public for the first time.

No Secrets is also the title of the single released on 21 April 2017 (Hands On Music). It follows the book's publication to mark Show of Hands fifth triumph at the Royal Albert Hall the week before.

Autumn 2017 saw the band starting work on their latest studio album Joint Venture and continuing to explore new sonic landscapes in their ongoing musical collaborations.

== Festival patrons ==
Show of Hands are patrons of the Sidmouth Folk Festival and St. Ives Festival and are also honorary patrons of the Royal Albert Memorial Museum in Exeter and Torrington's Plough Arts Centre. Knightley is also patron of the Costa Del Folk festival and, along with Oysterband's John Jones, Shrewsbury Folk Festival.

== Discography ==
=== Studio albums ===
- Show of Hands (1987)
- Tall Ships (1990)
- Out for the Count (1991)
- Beat about the Bush (1994)
- Lie of the Land (1995)
- Dark Fields (1997)
- Folk Music (1998)
- Backlog (1999)
- Covers (2000)
- Cold Frontier (2001)
- The Path (2003)
- Country Life (2003)
- Witness (2006)
- Arrogance Ignorance and Greed (2009) (UK Albums Chart: #170)
- Covers 2 (2010)
- Backlog 2 (2011)
- Wake the Union (2012) (UK Albums Chart: #73)
- Centenary: Words & Music of the Great War (2014) (UK Compilation Chart: #13)
- The Long Way Home (2016) (UK Albums Chart: #70)
- Battlefield Dance Floor (2019) (UK Albums Chart: #48)
- Now We Are Four (2020)
- Singled Out (2021)

=== Collaboration album ===
- Alianza (1992)
- The Dog Show Sessions Live (2023)

=== Live albums ===
- Live '92 (1994)
- Live at the Royal Albert Hall (1996)
- Cold Cuts (2002)
- As You Were (2005)
- Live at Exeter Phoenix (2008)
- Centenary Live at Exeter Cathedral (2016)
- Full Circle Live (2024)

=== Compilations ===
- Backlog 1987–1991 (1995)
- Anglicana (1999)
- No Song to Sing (2000)
- Show of Hands (2000)
- Roots: The Best of Show of Hands (2007)
- Roots 2 (2023)

=== Singles ===
- Columbus EP (1995)
- "Crazy Boy" (1997) (from Dark Fields)
- "Are We Alright" / "Crooked Man" (2004) (non-album single)
- "Witness" / "If I Needed Someone" (2006) (from Witness)
- "Roots" / "Country Life" (2007) (from Witness) (HMV Download Chart: #4)
- "Arrogance Ignorance and Greed" (2010) (from Arrogance Ignorance and Greed)
- "Arrogance Ignorance and Greed" / "Evolution" / "The Man I Was" (2010) (from Arrogance Ignorance and Greed)
- "Arrogance Ignorance and Greed" / "The Keys of Canterbury" (2010) (from Arrogance Ignorance and Greed)
- "Company Town" / "Now You Know"
- "Aunt Maria" / "King of the World"

=== Videos and DVDs ===
- Acoustic Workshop (1996)
- Stairway To Devon (1998)
- The Big Gig (2001)
- Show of Hands on Film – The Video Collection (2004)
- Tour of Topsham (2007)
- Show of Hands with the Urban Soul Orchestra – Live at Shrewsbury Folk Festival + Making the Waking (2013)
