= Track of Words =

Studio album by Steve Knightley
- Released: 1999
- Genre: Folk
- Label: Hands on Music HMCD10
- Producer: Matt Clifford with Gerard O'Farrell

Steve Knightley chronology
| Track of Words (1999) | Cruel River (2007) |

Track of Words is a 1999 solo album by singer-songwriter Steve Knightley.

A lost album of sorts, which was re-recorded by Knightley and co-producer/engineer Mark Tucker. The re-recorded album was released as Track of Words – Retraced in 2009. Retraced was included in Mike Ganley's Crooked Road "Top 10 Albums 2009" list.

== Track listing ==
All songs written by Steve Knightley, except where noted.

1. "Ahh! (Running Away)" – 4:10
2. "You're Mine" – 4:26
3. "Rush Of Blood" (Knightley/Matt Clifford) – 3:51
4. "Castaway" (Knightley/Clifford) – 4:05
5. "Track Of Words" – 3:46
6. "Faith In You" – 2:54
7. "The Cold Heart Of England" – 3:53
8. "Don't Look Now" – 4:14
9. "Face In The Frame" – 3:50
10. "It Wasn't You" – 3:36
11. "Caught In The Rain" (Knightley/Clifford) – 4:05
12. "Pain Away" – 3:55
13. "Broken" – 6:17

== Personnel ==
- Steve Knightley – lead vocals, acoustic guitar, cello-mandolin
- Matt Clifford – keyboards, percussion, and all other noises, backing vocals on track 11
- Paul Wassif – acoustic and electric guitars, dobro on tracks 7 and 10
- Polly Bolton – backing vocals on tracks 2 and 11
