= Steve Knightley =

English singer, songwriter and acoustic musician (born 1954)

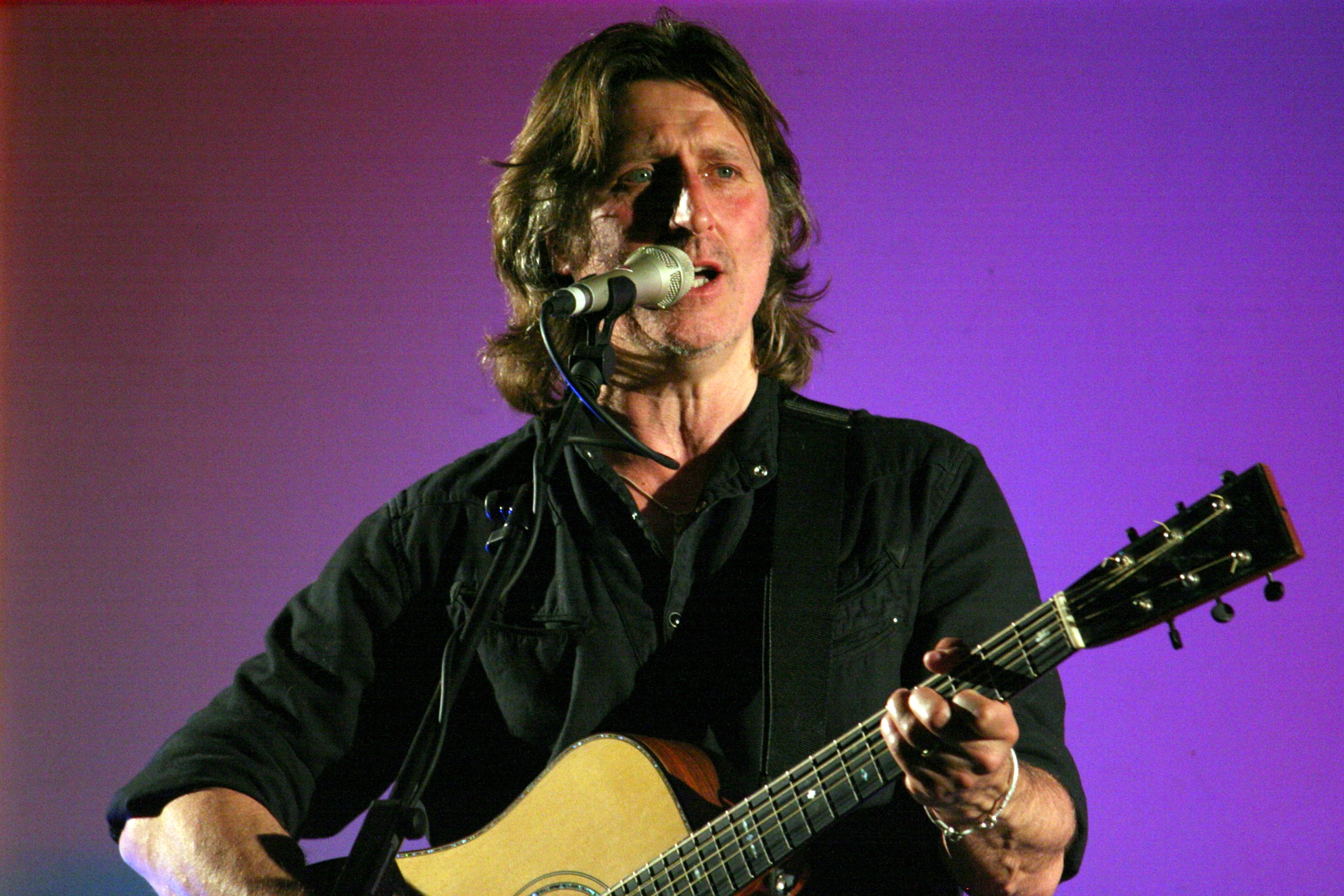
- Steve Knightley performing at Harberton Village Hall, Devon, 20 May 2009

Background information
- Born: 30 April 1954 (age 72); Southampton, England
- Genres: Roots music, folk-rock, folk music
- Occupations: Musician, songwriter, record producer,
- Instruments: Vocals, guitar, mandocello, cuatro mandolin, tenor guitar
- Years active: 1990–present

Steve Knightley (born 1954) is an English singer, songwriter and acoustic musician. Since 1992 he has been one half of folk/roots duo Show of Hands along with Phil Beer. Knightley was named "Songwriter of the Nineties" by BBC Radio 6 Music in 2012.

== Personal life ==
Knightley was born in Southampton in 1954 of English, Irish and Scottish descent. His grandfathers were both soldiers. When he was five his family moved to Exeter. At 13 the family moved again to nearby Exmouth. Apart from spells away in Coventry, Brighton, London and rural Dorset, he remains a resident of East Devon where he lives with his wife Clare, a local medical doctor, and their three children.

== Career ==
At fourteen Knightley began playing acoustic guitar at Exmouth Grammar School. It was there he met long-time friend and musical collaborator Paul Downes. Knightley was attracted to folk music after hearing his older step-brother's Joan Baez records. Together with Downes they began playing songs from the Penguin Book of English Folk Songs. They were also drawn to the repertoire of Martin Carthy and Dave Swarbrick after seeing them in concert at the Sidmouth Folk Festival. In 1970 they formed the trio 'Gawain' and, along with fiddler John 'Bat' Evans, were regulars on the thriving Devon folk scene for three years or so, meeting Phil Beer in the process. Downes then left for Brighton where he formed a professional partnership with Beer, touring for the next seven years.

By now, Knightley had moved to Coventry, where he both studied Politics and History at the Lanchester Polytechnic and started and played at a thriving folk club. Downes and Beer were constant visitors to the city and began playing the songs that by now Knightley was beginning to pen.

He then completed a postgraduate certificate in education at Sussex University near Brighton. While attending the university, Knightley teamed up with double bass player Warwick Downes, and for two years the duo performed around the Brighton area.

From 1979 to 1985, Knightley lived in London, working as a supply teacher and performing regularly on the pub rock circuit with his three bands Short Stories, The Cheats and Total Strangers. On occasions Beer would stand in for absent band members, and Knightley returned the favour by playing bass (under the pseudonym "Gene Vogel") for the Arizona Smoke Revue, the group Beer was in at the time.

Knightley left London in 1985 and moved to rural Dorset, where he opened a guest house. He also worked as a supply teacher at Beaminster School, and gave guitar lessons, most notably to PJ Harvey. The following year, Knightley met up again with Beer, who was then a member of the Albion Band. When Beer's commitments would allow, the two performed as a duo and began laying the groundwork for what would become the Show of Hands' first recordings.

Beer left the Albion Band in 1991, and from then on the two appeared regularly as Show of Hands in pubs, clubs and bars. In 1992, the duo got together with a group of exiled Chilean musicians, and toured and released an album under the name Alianza. Knightley continued working at Beaminster as a part-time teacher of media studies, history and music until 1994, when he left to concentrate on his music career.

In 2015, Knightley (alongside his fellow Show of Hands band members Phil Beer and Miranda Sykes), was awarded an honorary doctorate of music from the University of Plymouth, to commemorate "great distinction in [their] professional lives".

== Other ==
Knightley is Patron of Shrewsbury Folk Festival, Sidmouth Folk Week, St Ives Festival, and the Village Pump folk festival. In 2012, he was named "Songwriter of the Nineties" by Tom Robinson for BBC Radio 6 Music.

== Discography ==
- Track of Words (1999)
- Faith, Folk and Anarchy (with Martyn Joseph and Tom Robinson) (2002)
- Western Approaches (with Seth Lakeman and Jenna Witts) (2004)
- Bridgerow Sessions (with Martyn Joseph) (2005)
- Cruel River (2007)
- Track of Words – Retraced (2009)
- Live in Somerset (2011)
- Off the beaten track (2014)
- All at Sea (2016)
- Roadworks Songs and Stories Part II (2019)
- The Winter Yards (2024)
- Positively Folk Street (2025)

=== Alianza ===
- Alianza (1992)

=== Show of Hands ===
- See Show of Hands
