= 2021 Rugby World Cup squads =

The 2021 Rugby World Cup was an international rugby union tournament held in New Zealand from 8 October until 12 November 2022. Twelve national teams competed, and each brought a 32-player squad containing no regulated number of players per-position to the tournament. The tournament was administered by World Rugby, to whom each team submitted their finalised squad.

The numbers of caps for each player do not include any matches played after the start of tournament.

== Overview ==
Below is a table listing all the head coaches and captains for each nation.

Team	Coach	Captain
Australia	(Australia) Jay Tregonning	Shannon Parry
Canada	(France) Kévin Rouet	Sophie de Goede
England	(England) Simon Middleton	Sarah Hunter
Fiji	(Fiji) Senirusi Seruvakula	Sereima Leweniqila
France	(France) Thomas Darracq	Gaëlle Hermet
Italy	(Italy) Andrea Di Giandomenico	Elisa Giordano
Japan	(Canada) Lesley McKenzie	Saki Minami
New Zealand	(New Zealand) Wayne Smith	Ruahei Demant & Kennedy Simon
Scotland	(Scotland) Bryan Easson	Rachel Malcolm
South Africa	(South Africa) Stanley Raubenheimer	Nolusindiso Booi
United States	(England) Rob Cain	Kate Zackary
Wales	(Wales) Ioan Cunningham	Siwan Lillicrap

== Pool A ==
=== Australia ===
Australia named their final 32-player squad on 7 September 2022.

Player	Position	Caps	Club/Province
Ashley Marsters	Hooker	17	(Victoria (state)) Melbourne Rebels
Tania Naden	Hooker	0	(Australian Capital Territory) ACT Brumbies
Adiana Talakai	Hooker	5	(New South Wales) NSW Waratahs
Bree-Anna Cheatham	Prop	1	Queensland Reds
Eva Karpani	Prop	9	(New South Wales) NSW Waratahs
Bridie O'Gorman	Prop	7	(New South Wales) NSW Waratahs
Liz Patu	Prop	29	Queensland Reds
Emily Robinson	Prop	13	(New South Wales) NSW Waratahs
Madison Schuck	Prop	5	Queensland Reds
Atasi Lafai	Lock	4	(New South Wales) NSW Waratahs
Kaitlan Leaney	Lock	7	(New South Wales) NSW Waratahs
Michaela Leonard	Lock	11	(Australian Capital Territory) ACT Brumbies
Sera Naiqama	Lock	3	(New South Wales) NSW Waratahs
Emily Chancellor	Back row	12	(New South Wales) NSW Waratahs
Piper Duck	Back row	7	(New South Wales) NSW Waratahs
Grace Hamilton	Back row	21	(New South Wales) NSW Waratahs
Grace Kemp	Back row	2	(Australian Capital Territory) ACT Brumbies
Shannon Parry (c)	Back row	19	Queensland Reds
Iliseva Batibasaga	Scrum-Half	22	(New South Wales) NSW Waratahs
Layne Morgan	Scrum-Half	7	(New South Wales) NSW Waratahs
Arabella McKenzie	Fly-half	11	(New South Wales) NSW Waratahs
Trilleen Pomare	Fly-half	18	(Western Australia) Western Force
Georgina Friedrichs	Centre	7	(New South Wales) NSW Waratahs
Siokapesi Palu	Centre	1	(Australian Capital Territory) ACT Brumbies
Cecilia Smith	Centre	4	Queensland Reds
Sharni Williams	Centre	19	Australia Sevens
Mahalia Murphy	Wing	17	(New South Wales) NSW Waratahs
Maya Stewart	Wing	0	(New South Wales) NSW Waratahs
Bienne Terita	Wing	1	Australia Sevens
Ivania Wong	Wing	5	Queensland Reds
Lori Cramer	Fullback	11	(New South Wales) NSW Waratahs
Pauline Piliae-Rasabale	Fullback	7	(New South Wales) NSW Waratahs

=== New Zealand ===
New Zealand named their final 32-player squad on 13 September 2022.

Player	Position	Caps	Club/Province
Luka Connor	Hooker	8	(New Zealand) Chiefs / Bay of Plenty Volcanix
Natalie Delamere	Hooker	2	(New Zealand) Matatū / Bay of Plenty Volcanix
Georgia Ponsonby	Hooker	6	(New Zealand) Matatū / Canterbury
Tanya Kalounivale	Prop	4	(New Zealand) Chiefs / Waikato
Phillipa Love	Prop	19	(New Zealand) Matatū / Canterbury
Krystal Murray	Prop	4	(New Zealand) Blues / Northland
Amy Rule	Prop	6	(New Zealand) Matatū / Canterbury
Awhina Tangen-Wainohu	Prop	1	(New Zealand) Chiefs / Waikato
Santo Taumata	Prop	1	(New Zealand) Chiefs / Bay of Plenty Volcanix
Chelsea Bremner	Lock	5	(New Zealand) Matatū / Canterbury
Joanah Ngan-Woo	Lock	10	(New Zealand) Hurricanes / Wellington
Maiakawanakaulani Roos	Lock	7	(New Zealand) Blues / Auckland Storm
Alana Bremner	Back row	8	(New Zealand) Matatū / Canterbury
Sarah Hirini	Back row	10	(New Zealand) Hurricanes / Manawatū Cyclones
Charmaine McMenamin	Back row	27	(New Zealand) Blues / Auckland Storm
Liana Mikaele-Tu'u	Back row	6	(New Zealand) Blues / Auckland Storm
Kendra Reynolds	Back row	5	(New Zealand) Matatū / Bay of Plenty Volcanix
Kennedy Simon (cc)	Back row	10	(New Zealand) Chiefs / Waikato
Ariana Bayler	Scrum-Half	5	(New Zealand) Chiefs / Waikato
Kendra Cocksedge	Scrum-Half	61	(New Zealand) Matatū / Canterbury
Arihiana Marino-Tauhinu	Scrum-Half	9	(New Zealand) Chiefs / Counties Manukau
Ruahei Demant (cc)	Fly-half	20	(New Zealand) Blues / Auckland Storm
Hazel Tubic	Fly-half	16	(New Zealand) Chiefs / Counties Manukau
Sylvia Brunt	Centre	4	(New Zealand) Blues / Auckland Storm
Amy du Plessis	Centre	3	(New Zealand) Matatū / Canterbury
Theresa Fitzpatrick	Centre	12	(New Zealand) Blues / Auckland Storm
Stacey Fluhler	Outside Back	20	(New Zealand) Chiefs / Waikato
Renee Holmes	Outside Back	4	(New Zealand) Matatū / Waikato
Ayesha Leti-I'iga	Outside Back	17	(New Zealand) Hurricanes / Wellington
Ruby Tui	Outside Back	4	(New Zealand) Chiefs / Counties Manukau
Renee Wickliffe	Outside Back	44	(New Zealand) Chiefs / Bay of Plenty Volcanix
Portia Woodman	Outside Back	18	(New Zealand) Chiefs / Northland

=== Scotland ===
Scotland named their final 32-player squad on 15 September 2022.

^{1}On 17 October Choe Rollie left the squad through injury. No replacement was called up.

Player	Position	Caps	Club/Province
Leah Bartlett	Prop	18	(England) Loughborough Lightning
Christine Belisle	Prop	18	(England) Loughborough Lightning
Sarah Bonar	Lock	31	(England) Harlequins
Elliann Clarke	Prop	1	(Scotland) Edinburgh University
Katie Dougan	Prop	16	(England) Gloucester-Hartpury
Evie Gallagher	Back row	13	(England) University of Worcester Warriors
Jade Konkel-Roberts	Back row	53	(England) Harlequins
Rachel Malcolm (c)	Back row	30	(England) Loughborough Lightning
Rachel McLachlan	Back row	29	(England) Sale Sharks
Louise McMillan	Lock	37	(England) Saracens
Lyndsay O'Donnell	Lock	16	(England) University of Worcester Warriors
Lana Skeldon	Hooker	54	(England) University of Worcester Warriors
Jodie Rettie	Hooker	17	(England) Saracens
Emma Wassell	Lock	57	(England) Loughborough Lightning
Molly Wright	Hooker	15	(England) Sale Sharks
Anne Young	Back row	2	(Scotland) Heriot's Rugby
Shona Campbell	Wing	7	(Scotland) Edinburgh University
Megan Gaffney	Wing	44	(England) Loughborough Lightning
Coreen Grant	Centre	1	(England) Saracens
Sarah Law	Fly-half	52	(England) Sale Sharks
Rhona Lloyd	Wing	39	(France) Stade Bordelais
Caity Mattinson	Scrum-half	6	(England) University of Worcester Warriors
Mairi McDonald	Scrum-half	8	(Scotland) Hillhead Jordanhill
Liz Musgrove	Wing	10	(Scotland) Watsonians
Helen Nelson (vc)	Fly-half	43	(England) Loughborough Lightning
Emma Orr	Centre	4	(Scotland) Biggar RFC
^{1}Chloe Rollie	Fullback	50	(England) Exeter Chiefs
Eilidh Sinclair	Wing	18	(England) Exeter Chiefs
Hannah Smith	Centre	34	(Scotland) Watsonians
Meryl Smith	Wing	3	(Scotland) Edinburgh University
Lisa Thomson	Centre	46	(England) Sale Sharks
Evie Wills	Fly-half	3	(Scotland) Hillhead Jordanhill

=== Wales ===
Wales named their final 32-player squad on 21 September 2022.

^{1}On 12 October Alisha Butchers was released from the squad following a knee injury sustained in Wales' match against Scotland. No replacement was initially called up.

^{2}On 26 October Kate Williams was called up to the Wales squad.

Player	Position	Caps	Club/Province
Keira Bevan	Scrum-half	44	(England) Bristol Bears
Lleucu George	Centre	10	(England) Gloucester-Hartpury
Hannah Jones (vc)	Centre	39	(England) Gloucester-Hartpury
Jasmine Joyce	Wing	27	(England) Bristol Bears
Kerin Lake	Centre	38	(England) Gloucester-Hartpury
Lisa Neumann	Wing	27	(England) Gloucester-Hartpury
Ffion Lewis	Scrum-half	24	(England) University of Worcester Warriors
Lowri Norkett	Centre	2	(England) University of Worcester Warriors
Kayleigh Powell	Fullback	11	(England) Bristol Bears
Elinor Snowsill	Fly-half	67	(England) Bristol Bears
Niamh Terry	Fly-half	7	(England) University of Worcester Warriors
Megan Webb	Centre	9	(England) Bristol Bears
Robyn Wilkins	Fly-half	59	(England) Exeter Chiefs
Carys Williams-Morris	Centre	2	(England) Loughborough Lightning
^{1}Alisha Butchers	Back row	38	(England) Bristol Bears
Alex Callender	Back row	19	(England) University of Worcester Warriors
Gwen Crabb	Lock	25	(England) Gloucester-Hartpury
Georgia Evans	Lock	12	(England) Saracens
Kat Evans	Hooker	3	(England) Saracens
Abbie Fleming	Back row	4	(England) Exeter Chiefs
Cerys Hale	Prop	40	(England) Gloucester-Hartpury
Sioned Harries	Back row	65	(England) University of Worcester Warriors
Cara Hope	Prop	21	(England) Gloucester-Hartpury
Natalia John	Lock	29	(England) University of Worcester Warriors
Kelsey Jones	Hooker	14	(England) Gloucester-Hartpury
Bethan Lewis	Back row	29	(England) Gloucester-Hartpury
Gwenllian Pyrs	Prop	21	(England) Bristol Bears
Donna Rose	Prop	12	(England) Saracens
Siwan Lillicrap (c)	Back row	47	(England) Gloucester-Hartpury
Carys Phillips	Hooker	60	(England) University of Worcester Warriors
Caryl Thomas	Prop	60	(England) University of Worcester Warriors
Sisilia Tuipulotu	Prop	4	(England) Gloucester-Hartpury
^{2}Kate Williams	Back row	0	(New Zealand) Blues / North Harbour

== Pool B ==
=== Canada ===
Canada named their final 32-player squad on 31 August 2022.

^{1}On 5 October Laura Russell was ruled out of the tournament through injury. She was replaced by Pamphinette Buisa.

^{2}On 20 October Taylor Perry and Brianna Miller were both ruled out of the remainder of the tournament through injury. Veronica Harrigan joined the squad.

Player	Position	Caps	Club/Province
Alexandra Tessier	Centre	35	(Quebec) Sainte-Anne-de-Bellevue RFC
Alex Ellis	Prop	9	(England) Saracens
Alysha Corrigan	Wing	9	(England) Saracens
Anaïs Holly	Wing	16	(Quebec) Town of Mont-Royal RFC
^{2}Brianna Miller	Scrum-half	31	(Quebec) Sainte-Anne-de-Bellevue RFC
Brittany Kassil	Hooker	27	(Ontario) Guelph Redcoats
Courtney Holtkamp	Back row	19	(Alberta) Red Deer Titans
DaLeaka Menin	Prop	37	(England) Exeter Chiefs
Elissa Alarie	Fullback	41	(British Columbia) Westshore RFC
Emily Tuttosi	Hooker	10	(England) Exeter Chiefs
Emma Taylor	Lock	12	(Nova Scotia) Halifax Rugby Club
Fabiola Forteza	Back row	13	(Quebec) Club de rugby de Québec
Gabrielle Senft	Back row	10	(England) Exeter Chiefs
Gillian Boag	Hooker	11	(British Columbia) Capilano RFC
Julia Schell	Fly-half	4	(British Columbia) Castaway Wanderers
Justine Pelletier	Fly-half	10	(Quebec) Club de rugby de Québec
Karen Paquin	Back row	32	(France) Stade Bordelais
^{1}Laura Russell	Hooker	44	(Ontario) Toronto Nomads
Maddy Grant	Centre	0	(Ontario) University of Ottawa
Marie Thibault	Scrum-half	0	(Quebec) Club de rugby de Québec
McKinley Hunt	Lock	9	(England) Exeter Chiefs
Mikiela Nelson	Prop	4	(British Columbia) Capilano RFC
Ngalula Fuamba	Back row	8	(Quebec) Town of Mont-Royal RFC
Olivia DeMerchant	Prop	49	(Nova Scotia) Halifax Tars RFC
Paige Farries	Wing	19	(England) University of Worcester Warriors
^{1}Pamphinette Buisa	Wing		(Ontario) Ottawa Irish
Sabrina Poulin	Wing	9	(Quebec) Town of Mont-Royal RFC
Sara Kaljuvee	Centre	12	(Ontario) Toronto Scottish
Sara Svoboda	Back row	13	(England) Loughborough Lightning
Sarah-Maude Lachance	Fly-half	2	(France) Section Paloise
Sophie de Goede (c)	Back row	14	(British Columbia) Castaway Wanderers RFC
^{2}Taylor Perry	Fly-half	11	(Ontario) Oakville Crusaders
Tyson Beukeboom	Lock	49	(British Columbia) Cowichan RFC
^{2}Veronica Harrigan	Hooker	2	(Ontario) Brantford Harlequins

Maya Montiel, Cindy Nelles, Abby Duguid, Janna Slevinsky, Renee Gonzalez and Chloe Daniels were selected as non-travelling reserves.

=== Italy ===
Italy named their final 32-player squad on 21 September 2022.

Player	Position	Caps	Club/Province
Francesca Barro	Prop	1	(Veneto) Valsugana Rugby Padova
Lucia Gai	Prop	84	(Veneto) Valsugana Rugby Padova
Gaia Maris	Prop	12	(England) Wasps
Michela Merlo	Prop	11	(Emilia-Romagna) Rugby Colorno
Sara Seye	Prop	8	(Lombardy) Rugby Calvisano
Emanuela Stecca	Prop	3	(Veneto) Villorba Rugby
Silvia Turani	Prop	20	(England) Exeter Chiefs
Melissa Bettoni	Hooker	72	(France) Stade Rennais
Vittoria Vecchini	Hooker	11	(Veneto) Valsugana Rugby Padova
Giordana Duca	Lock	31	(Veneto) Valsugana Rugby Padova
Valeria Fedrighi	Lock	36	(France) Stade Toulousain
Isabella Locatelli	Lock	34	(Emilia-Romagna) Rugby Colorno
Sara Tounesi	Lock	24	(England) Sale Sharks
Ilaria Arrighetti	Back row	56	(France) Stade Rennais
Giada Franco	Back row	24	(Emilia-Romagna) Rugby Colorno
Elisa Giordano (c)	Back row	56	(Veneto) Valsugana Rugby Padova
Francesca Sgorbini	Back row	13	(France) ASM Romagnat
Beatrice Veronese	Back row	12	(Veneto) Valsugana Rugby Padova
Sara Barattin	Scrum-half	107	(Veneto) Villorba Rugby
Sofia Stefan	Scrum-half	69	(Veneto) Valsugana Rugby Padova
Veronica Madia	Fly-half	32	(Emilia-Romagna) Rugby Colorno
Emma Stevanin	Fly-half	2	(Veneto) Valsugana Rugby Padova
Beatrice Capomaggi	Centre	4	(Veneto) Villorba Rugby
Alyssa D'Inca'	Centre	10	(Veneto) Villorba Rugby
Beatrice Rigoni	Centre	57	(Veneto) Valsugana Rugby Padova
Michela Sillari	Centre	70	(Veneto) Valsugana Rugby Padova
Manuela Furlan	Outside Back	88	(Veneto) Villorba Rugby
Francesca Granzotto	Outside Back	2	(Lazio) Unione Rugby Capitolina
Maria Magatti	Outside Back	46	(Lombardy) CUS Milano Rugby
Aura Muzzo	Outside Back	27	(Veneto) Villorba Rugby
Vittoria Ostuni Minuzzi	Outside Back	16	(Veneto) Valsugana Rugby Padova
Sofia Rolfi	Outside Back	0	(Emilia-Romagna) Rugby Colorno

=== Japan ===
Japan named their final 32-player squad on 13 September 2022.

Player	Position	Caps	Club/Province
Sachiko Kato	Prop	11	(Tokyo) Yokogawa Musashino Artemi-Stars
Wako Kitano	Prop	6	(Mie Prefecture) Mie Pearls
Hinata Komaki	Hooker	3	(Tokyo) Nippon Sport Science University
Yuka Sadaka	Prop	13	(Aomori Prefecture) Hirosaki Sakura Ovals
Saki Minami (c)	Prop	26	(Tokyo) Yokogawa Musashino Artemi-Stars
Makoto Lavemai	Prop	18	(Tokyo) Yokogawa Musashino Artemi-Stars
Kotomi Taniguchi	Hooker	4	(Mie Prefecture) Mie Pearls
Nijiho Nagata	Hooker	9	(Chiba Prefecture) International Budo University
Masami Kawamura	Lock	3	(Ibaraki Prefecture) RKU Rugby Ryugasaki Grace
Yuna Sato	Lock	7	Tokyo Sankyu Phoenix
Maki Takano	Lock	17	(Tokyo) Yokogawa Musashino Artemi-Stars
Kie Tamai	Lock	14	(Mie Prefecture) Mie Pearls
Otoka Yoshimura	Lock	5	(Tokyo) Rissho University
Sakurako Korai	Back row	2	(Tokyo) Nippon Sport Science University
Seina Saito	Back row	32	(Mie Prefecture) Mie Pearls
Misaki Suzuki	Back row	30	Tokyo Sankyu Phoenix
Iroha Nagata	Back row	16	(Saitama Prefecture) Arukas Queen Kumagaya
Kyoko Hosokawa	Back row	8	(Mie Prefecture) Mie Pearls
Ayano Nagai	Back row	11	(Kanagawa Prefecture) Yokohama TKM
Megumi Abe	Scrum-half	11	(Saitama Prefecture) Arukas Queen Kumagaya
Moe Tsukui	Scrum-half	19	(Tokyo) Yokogawa Musashino Artemi-Stars
Ayasa Otsuka	Fly-half	10	(Ibaraki Prefecture) RKU Rugby Ryugasaki Grace
Minori Yamamoto	Fly-half	21	(Mie Prefecture) Mie Pearls
Komachi Imakugi	Wing	10	(Tokyo) Rissho University
Hinano Nagura	Wing	11	(Tokyo) Yokogawa Musashino Artemi-Stars
Yuki Ito	Wing	12	(Mie Prefecture) Mie Pearls
Ayaka Suzuki	Wing	18	(Saitama Prefecture) Arukas Queen Kumagaya
Shione Nakayama	Centre	8	(Tokyo) Yokogawa Musashino Artemi-Stars
Mana Furuta	Centre	15	Tokyo Sankyu Phoenix
Ria Anoku	Fullback	7	(Mie Prefecture) Mie Pearls
Ai Hirayama	Fullback	5	(Kanagawa Prefecture) National Defense Academy of Japan
Rinka Matsuda	Fullback	6	(Tokyo) Nippon Sport Science University

=== United States ===
The United States named their final 32-player squad on 16 September 2022.

Player	Position	Caps	Club/Province
Alev Kelter	Fullback	16	(England) Saracens
Bridget Kahele	Scrum-half	2	(Massachusetts) Beantown RFC
Carly Waters	Scrum-half	10	(England) Sale Sharks
Catie Benson	Prop	28	(England) Sale Sharks
Charli Jacoby	Prop	12	(England) Exeter Chiefs
Charlotte Clapp	Wing	3	(England) Saracens
Elizabeth Cairns	Back row	18	(California) Life West Gladiatrix
Erica Jarrell	Prop	0	(Massachusetts) Beantown RFC
Eti Haungatau	Centre	4	(Missouri) Lindenwood University
Evelyn Ashenbrucker	Lock	4	(California) San Diego Surfers
Gabby Cantorna	Fly-half	13	(England) Exeter Chiefs
Georgie Perris-Redding	Back row	3	(England) Sale Sharks
Hallie Taufo'ou	Lock	7	(England) Loughborough Lightning
Hope Rogers	Prop	36	(England) Exeter Chiefs
Jennine Detiveaux	Wing	11	(England) Exeter Chiefs
Jenny Kronish	Lock	4	(England) Harlequins
Jett Hayward	Hooker	0	(California) Life West Gladiatrix
Joanna Kitlinski	Hooker	19	(England) Sale Sharks
Jordan Matyas	Lock	21	(United States) USA Sevens
Katana Howard	Centre	11	(England) Sale Sharks
Kate Zackary (c)	Back row	22	(England) Exeter Chiefs
Kathryn Johnson	Back row	6	(Minnesota) Twin Cities Amazons
Kathryn Treder	Hooker	5	(Massachusetts) Beantown RFC
Kristine Sommer	Lock	19	(Washington (state)) Seattle Rugby Club
Maya Learned	Prop	7	(England) Gloucester-Hartpury RFC
McKenzie Hawkins	Fly-half	8	(California) Life West Gladiatrix
Megan Foster	Fly-half	9	(England) Exeter Chiefs
Meya Bizer	Fullback	21	(Massachusetts) Beantown RFC
Nick James	Prop	20	(England) Sale Sharks
Olivia Ortiz	Scrum-half	11	Colorado Gray Wolves
Rachel Johnson	Back row	13	(England) Exeter Chiefs
Tess Feury	Fullback	11	(England) Wasps

Alycia Washington, Rachel Ehrecke, Bulou Mataitoga and Saher Hamdan were named as non-travelling reserves.

== Pool C ==
=== England ===
England named their final 32-player squad on 20 September 2022.

^{1}On 22 October Laura Keates withdrew from the squad due to injury. They were replaced by Detysha Harper.

Player	Position	Caps	Club/Province
Zoe Aldcroft	Lock	32	(England) Gloucester-Hartpury
Sarah Bern	Prop	46	(England) Bristol Bears
Hannah Botterman	Prop	30	(England) Saracens
Shaunagh Brown	Prop	27	(England) Harlequins
Poppy Cleall	Back row	57	(England) Saracens
Amy Cokayne	Hooker	64	(England) Harlequins
Vickii Cornborough	Prop	70	(England) Harlequins
Lark Davies	Hooker	41	(England) Bristol Bears
Rosie Galligan	Lock	7	(England) Harlequins
^{1}Detysha Harper	Prop	5	(England) Loughborough Lightning
Sarah Hunter (c)	Back row	135	(England) Loughborough Lightning
Sadia Kabeya	Back row	4	(England) Loughborough Lightning
^{1}Laura Keates	Prop	50	(England) University of Worcester Warriors
Alex Matthews	Back row	51	(England) Gloucester-Hartpury
Maud Muir	Prop	11	(England) Gloucester-Hartpury
Cath O'Donnell	Lock	20	(England) Loughborough Lightning
Marlie Packer	Back row	84	(England) Saracens
Connie Powell	Hooker	5	(England) Gloucester-Hartpury
Morwenna Talling	Lock	4	(England) Loughborough Lightning
Abbie Ward	Lock	56	(England) Bristol Bears
Holly Aitchison	Fly-half	10	(England) Saracens
Jess Breach	Wing	23	(England) Saracens
Abby Dow	Wing	24	(England) Wasps
Zoe Harrison	Fly-half	40	(England) Saracens
Tatyana Heard	Centre	5	(England) Gloucester-Hartpury
Leanne Infante	Scrum-half	52	(England) Saracens
Ellie Kildunne	Wing	25	(England) Harlequins
Claudia MacDonald	Scrum-half	20	(England) Exeter Chiefs
Sarah McKenna	Fullback	42	(England) Saracens
Lucy Packer	Scrum-half	5	(England) Harlequins
Helena Rowland	Fly-half	17	(England) Loughborough Lightning
Emily Scarratt (vc)	Centre	103	(England) Loughborough Lightning
Lydia Thompson	Wing	54	(England) University of Worcester Warriors

=== Fiji ===
Fiji named their final 32-player squad on 21 September 2022.

Player	Position	Caps	Club/Province
Joma Rubuti	Prop	11	(Fiji) Fijiana Drua
Bitila Tawake	Hooker	5	(Fiji) Fijiana Drua
Mereoni Vonosere	Prop	2	(Fiji) Fijiana Drua
Asinate Serevi	Lock	2	Unattatched
Sulita Waisega	Lock	3	(Netherlands) Haagsche Rugby Club
Karalaini Naisewa	Back row	6	(Fiji) Fijiana Drua
Ema Adivitaloga	Back row	6	(Fiji) Fijiana Drua
Sereima Leweniqila (c)	Back row	8	(Fiji) Fijiana Drua
Ana Maria Roqica	Scrum-half	3	(Fiji) Fijiana Sevens
Merewalesi Rokouono	Fly-half	8	(Fiji) Fijiana Drua
Vitalina Naikore	Wing	6	(Fiji) Fijiana Drua
Akanisi Sokoiwasa	Centre	0	(Fiji) Fijiana Sevens
Raijieli Laqeretabua	Centre	5	(Fiji) Fijiana Drua
Ilisapeci Delaiwau	Wing	3	(Fiji) Nadi
Alowesi Nakoci	Wing	3	(Fiji) Fijiana Sevens
Jiowana Sauto	Hooker	4	(Fiji) Fijiana Drua
Iris Verebalavu	Prop	0	(Australia) ACT Brumbies
Bulou Vasuturaga	Prop	3	(Fiji) Suva
Merevesi Ofakimalino	Lock	5	(Fiji) Fijiana Drua
Akosita Ravato	Back row	3	(Fiji) Fijiana Drua
Rusila Nagasau	Back row	5	(Fiji) Fijiana Sevens
Timaima Ravisa	Fullback	4	(Fiji) Fijiana Drua
Roela Radiniyavuni	Fullback	4	(Fiji) Fijiana Drua
Siteri Rasolea	Prop	0	Unattatched
Vika Matarugu	Hooker	7	(Fiji) Fijiana Drua
Raijieli Daveua	Lock	0	(Fiji) Fijiana Sevens
Kolora Lomani	Fly-half	4	(Fiji) Fijiana Drua
Melaia Matanatabu	Centre	4	(Fiji) Fijiana Drua
Ana Maria Naimisa	Wing	1	(Fiji) Fijiana Sevens
Talei Wilson	Centre	3	(Australia) ACT Brumbies
Sesenieli Donu	Centre	1	(Fiji) Fijiana Sevens
Lavena Cavuru	Scrum-half	4	(Fiji) Fijiana Sevens

=== France ===
France named their final 32-player squad on 11 September 2022

^{1}On 17 October Laure Sansus withdrew from the squad through injury. She was replaced by Marie Dupouy.

Player	Position	Caps	Club/Province
Julie Annery	Back row	26	(Île-de-France) Stade Français Paris
Rose Bernadou	Prop	8	(Occitania (administrative region)) Montpellier RC
Emilie Boulard	Fullback	13	(Île-de-France) RC Chilly Mazarin
Pauline Bourdon	Scrum-half	38	(Occitania (administrative region)) Stade Toulousain Rugby
Yllana Brosseau	Prop	6	(Nouvelle-Aquitaine) Stade Bordelais
Alexandra Chambon	Scrum-half	6	(Auvergne-Rhône-Alpes) FC Grenoble Amazones
Annaëlle Deshayes	Prop	35	(Auvergne-Rhône-Alpes) Lyon Olympique Universitaire
Célia Domain	Prop	4	(Occitania (administrative region)) Blagnac Rugby Féminin
Caroline Drouin	Fly-half	25	(Brittany) Stade Rennais Rugby
^{1}Marie Dupouy	Centre	1	(Occitania (administrative region)) Blagnac Rugby Féminin
Charlotte Escudero	Back row	1	(Occitania (administrative region)) Blagnac Rugby Féminin
Madoussou Fall	Lock	18	(Nouvelle-Aquitaine) Stade Bordelais
Manae Feleu	Lock	3	(Auvergne-Rhône-Alpes) FC Grenoble Amazones
Céline Ferer	Flanker	53	(Occitania (administrative region)) Stade Toulousain Rugby
Maëlle Filopon	Centre	15	(Occitania (administrative region)) Stade Toulousain Rugby
Joanna Grisez	Wing	0	(Île-de-France) AC Bobigny 93 Rugby
Emeline Gros	Back row	17	(Occitania (administrative region)) Montpellier RC
Gaëlle Hermet (c)	Back row	44	(Occitania (administrative region)) Stade Toulousain Rugby
Chloé Jacquet	Fullback	10	(Auvergne-Rhône-Alpes) Lyon Olympique Universitaire
Clara Joyeux	Prop	31	(Occitania (administrative region)) Blagnac Rugby Féminin
Assia Khalfaoui	Prop	4	(Nouvelle-Aquitaine) Stade Bordelais
Coco Lindelauf	Prop	9	(Occitania (administrative region)) Blagnac Rugby Féminin
Mélissande Llorens	Wing	5	(Occitania (administrative region)) Blagnac Rugby Féminin
Marjorie Mayans	Back row	48	(Occitania (administrative region)) Blagnac Rugby Féminin
Marine Ménager	Wing	31	(Occitania (administrative region)) Montpellier RC
Romane Ménager	Back row	49	(Occitania (administrative region)) Montpellier RC
Safi N'Diaye	Back row	85	(Occitania (administrative region)) Montpellier RC
Lina Queyroi	Fly-half	2	(Occitania (administrative region)) Blagnac Rugby Féminin
^{1}Laure Sansus	Scrum-half	30	(Occitania (administrative region)) Stade Toulousain Rugby
Agathe Sochat	Hooker	36	(Nouvelle-Aquitaine) Stade Bordelais
Laure Touyé	Hooker	22	(Occitania (administrative region)) Montpellier RC
Jessy Trémoulière	Fullback	71	(Auvergne-Rhône-Alpes) ASM Romagnat Rugby Féminin
Gabrielle Vernier	Centre	26	(Occitania (administrative region)) Blagnac Rugby Féminin

=== South Africa ===
South Africa named their final 32-player squad on 21 September 2022.

Player	Position	Caps	Club/Province
Sanelisiwe Charlie	Prop	4	(South Africa) EP Queens
Babalwa Latsha	Prop	17	(South Africa) DHL Western Province
Monica Mazibukwana	Prop	3	(South Africa) EP Queens
Azisa Mkiva	Prop	1	(South Africa) DHL Western Province
Yonela Ngxingolo	Prop	18	(South Africa) Border Ladies
Asithandile Ntoyanto	Prop	12	(South Africa) Border Ladies
Roseline Botes	Hooker	5	(South Africa) DHL Western Province
Micke Günter	Hooker	3	(South Africa) Cell C Sharks Women
Lindelwa Gwala	Hooker	18	(South Africa) Cell C Sharks Women
Nolusindiso Booi (c)	Lock	30	(South Africa) DHL Western Province
Lerato Makua	Lock	5	(South Africa) Blue Bulls Women
Nompumelelo Mathe	Lock	8	(South Africa) Cell C Sharks Women
Catha Jacobs	Lock	7	(South Africa) Blue Bulls Women
Lusanda Dumke	Back row	15	(South Africa) Border Ladies
Aseza Hele	Back row	13	(South Africa) Boland Dames
Sinazo Mcatshulwa	Back row	15	(South Africa) DHL Western Province
Sizophila Solontsi	Back row	13	(South Africa) Cell C Sharks Women
Rights Mkhari	Back row	8	(South Africa) Blue Bulls Women
Tayla Kinsey	Scrum-half	21	(South Africa) Cell C Sharks Women
Rumandi Potgieter	Scrum-half	3	(South Africa) Blue Bulls Women
Unam Tose	Scrum-half	11	(South Africa) Border Ladies
Libbie Janse van Rensburg	Fly-half	10	(South Africa) Blue Bulls Women
Zenay Jordaan	Fly-half	34	(South Africa) EP Queens
Jakkie Cilliers	Centre	2	(South Africa) Blue Bulls Women
Zintle Mpupha	Centre	15	(South Africa) DHL Western Province
Aphiwe Ngwevu	Centre	12	(South Africa) Border Ladies
Chumisa Qawe	Centre	9	(South Africa) DHL Western Province
Nomawethu Mabenge	Outside Back	9	(South Africa) EP Queens
Chuma Qawe	Outside Back	3	(South Africa) DHL Western Province
Eloise Webb	Outside Back	7	(South Africa) Border Ladies
Simamkele Namba	Outside Back	6	(South Africa) DHL Western Province
Nadine Roos	Outside Back	8	(South Africa) Blue Bulls Women

== Statistics ==
All statistics relate to the initial 32-man squads named prior to the start of the tournament on 8 October 2022 and do not include players who joined a squad during the tournament.

- Six squads included no players based outside their home country: Australia, New Zealand, England, France, Japan and South Africa
- The squads with the fewest players playing domestically are Wales (zero) and Scotland (nine)

=== Player representation by club ===
The 384 participating players, 2 players unattached, represented 84 different club sides and 3 national sevens programs. The sides with the most players selected are below:

Players	Clubs
18	(Australia) NSW Waratahs, (England) Gloucester-Hartpury, (England) Saracens
17	(England) Exeter Chiefs, (Fiji) Fijiana Drua
15	(England) Loughborough Lightning, (England) University of Worcester Warriors
12	(New Zealand) Chiefs Manawa
11	(England) Sale Sharks, (Italy) Valsugana Rugby Padova
10	(England) Bristol Bears, (New Zealand) Matatū, (South Africa) DHL Western Province
9	(England) Harlequins
8	(France) Blagnac Rugby Féminin, (Fiji) Fijiana Sevens, (Japan) MIE Pearls

=== Players representation by league ===
League	Players	Percent
Premier 15s (England)	116	30.2%
Super W (Australia) (Fiji)	49	12.8%
Élite 1 (France)	39	10.2%
Super Rugby Aupiki (New Zealand)	32	8.3%
Women's Premier Division (South Africa)	32	8.3%
Japan Women's Rugby Championship	32	8.3%
Serie A Division 1 (Italy)	23	6.0%
National Sevens Squads (Australia) (Fiji) (United States)	11	2.9%
Women's Premier League Rugby (United States)	10	2.6%
Super Ligue Féminine (Quebec)	8	2.1%
Other	30	7.8%
Unattatched	2	0.5%
Total	384	—

=== Squad Caps ===
Nation	Caps	Most capped player	Least capped player
Australia	302	Liz Patu (29)	Tania Naden (0) Maya Stewart (0)
Canada	569	Olivia DeMerchant (49) Tyson Beukeboom (49)	Maddy Grant (0) Marie Thibault (0)
England	1214	Sarah Hunter (135)	Sadia Kabeya (4) Morwenna Talling (4)
Fiji	123	Joma Rubuti (11)	Akanisi Sokoiwasa (0) Iris Verebalavu (0) Siteri Rasolea (0) Raijieli Daveua (0)
France	771	Safi N'Diaye (85)	Joanna Grisez (0)
Italy	1038	Sara Barattin (107)	Sofia Rolfi (0)
Japan	388	Seina Saito (32)	Sakurako Korai (2)
New Zealand	360	Kendra Cocksedge (61)	Awhina Tangen-Wainohu (1) Santo Taumata (1)
Scotland	775	Emma Wassell (57)	Elliann Clarke (1) Coreen Grant (1)
South Africa	352	Zenay Jordaan (34)	Azisa Mkiva (1)
United States	374	Hope Rogers (36)	Erica Jarrell (0) Jett Hayward (0)
Wales	869	Elinor Snowsill (67)	Lowri Norkett (2) Carys Williams-Morris (2)
