= 2021 Rugby World Cup warm-up matches =

The 2021 Rugby World Cup warm-up matches were a series of rugby union international test matches played to prepare teams for the 2021 Rugby World Cup, which were held in New Zealand in October and November 2022. They involved the 12 teams qualified for the World Cup, with Spain also included. The 2022 Laurie O'Reilly Cup was contested as part of the fixtures. They were held at a variety of venues from 24 July to 24 September 2022.

== Matches ==
=== 24 July ===
24 July 2022
14:45 JST (UTC+09)

Japan	15–6	South Africa
Try: Saito (2) 9' m, 64' c Con: Imakugi (0/1); Yamamoto (1/1) 65'; Pen: Yamamoto (1/1) 69'	Report	Pen: Janse van Rensburg (2/2) 12', 21

Kamaishi Recovery Memorial Stadium, Kamaishi
Referee: Amber McLachlan (Australia)

Team details

FB	15	Rinka Matsuda
RW	14	Mikasa Isogai
OC	13	Mana Furuta
IC	12	Shione Nakayama	(substituted off) 54'
LW	11	Hinano Nagura
FH	10	Komachi Imakugi
SH	9	Megumi Abe
N8	8	Sora Konishi	(substituted off) 40'
OF	7	Iroha Nagata	(substituted off) 69'
BF	6	Seina Saito
RL	5	Otoka Yoshimura	(substituted off) 56'
LL	4	Kie Tamai
TP	3	Wako Kitano	(substituted off) 56'
HK	2	Nijiho Nagata	(substituted off) 58'
LP	1	Saki Minami (c)	(substituted off) 59'
Replacements:
PR	16	Makoto Lavemai	(substituted on) 59'
HK	17	Misaki Suzuki	(substituted on) 58'
PR	18	Yuka Sadaka	(substituted on) 56'
LK	19	Masami Kawamura	(substituted on) 56'
FL	20	Ayano Nagai	(substituted on) 40'
SH	21	Kotono Yasuo
FH	22	Minori Yamamoto	(substituted on) 54'
FL	23	Sakurako Korai	(substituted on) 69'
Coach:
(Canada) Lesley McKenzie

FB	15	Nadine Roos
RW	14	Nomawethu Mabenge
OC	13	Zintle Mphupa
IC	12	Aphiwe Ngwevu	(substituted off) 60'
LW	11	Simamkele Namba	(substituted off) 69'
FH	10	Libbe Janse van Rensburg
SH	9	Rumandi Potgieter	(substituted off) 56'
N8	8	Aseza Hele	(substituted off) 46'
BF	7	Sinazo Mcatshulwa
OF	6	Lusandra Dumke
RL	5	Lerato Makua
LL	4	Nolusindiso Booi (c)	(substituted off) 48'
TP	3	Babalwa Latsha	(substituted off) 56'
HK	2	Lindelwa Gwala	(substituted off) 56'
LP	1	Yonela Ngxingolo	(substituted off) 61'
Replacements:
HK	16	Micke Gunter	(substituted on) 56'
PR	17	Sanelisiwe Charlie	(substituted on) 61'
PR	18	Monica Mazibukwana	(substituted on) 56'
FL	19	Rights Mkhari	(substituted on) 48'
FL	20	Nokubonga Siko	(substituted on) 46'
SH	21	Unam Tose	(substituted on) 56'
FH	22	Tayla Kinsey	(substituted on) 69'
FL	23	Chumisa Qawe	(substituted on) 60'
Coach:
(South Africa) Stanley Raubenheimer

Assistant referees:
Shuhei Kubo (Japan)
Ano Kuwai (Japan)

Notes:

- Rumandi Potgieter and Monica Mazibukwana (South Africa) made their international debuts.

24 July 2022
15:00 PDT (UTC-07)

Canada	34–24	Italy
Try: Farries (2) 7' m, 69' m Kaljuvee 19' c Tuttosi 43' c de Goede 48' c Con: Miller (3/5) 19', 43', 48'; Pen: de Goede (1/1) 77'	Report	Try: Ostuni Minuzzi 9' c Magatti 41' m Tounesi 57' m Giordano 74' c Pen: Sillari (2/4) 9', 74'

Starlight Stadium, Langford
Referee: Sara Cox (England)

Team details

FB	15	Elissa Alarie
RW	14	Sabrina Poulin
OC	13	Maddy Grant	(substituted off) 54'
IC	12	Sara Kaljuvee
LW	11	Paige Farries
FH	10	Julia Schell
SH	9	Brianna Miller	(substituted off) 65'
N8	8	Sophie de Goede (c)
OF	7	Fabiola Forteza	(substituted off) 60'
BF	6	Courtney Holtkamp	(substituted off) 71'
RL	5	Tyson Beukeboom	(substituted off) 40'
LL	4	Emma Taylor
TP	3	DaLeaka Menin	(substituted off) 61'
HK	2	Emily Tuttosi	(substituted off) 65'
LP	1	Olivia DeMerchant	(substituted off) 54'
Replacements:
HK	16	Gillian Boag	(substituted on) 65'
PR	17	Brittany Kassil	(substituted on) 54'
PR	18	Maya Montiel	(substituted on) 61'
LK	19	McKinley Hunt	(substituted on) 40'
FL	20	Karen Paquin	(substituted on) 60'
FL	21	Gabrielle Senft	(substituted on) 71'
SH	22	Justine Pelletier	(substituted on) 65'
CE	23	Alex Tessier	(substituted on) 54'
Coach:
(Canada) Kévin Rouet

FB	15	Vittoria Ostuni Minuzzi
RW	14	Aura Muzzo	(substituted off) 59'
OC	13	Michela Sillari
IC	12	Beatrice Rigoni
LW	11	Maria Magatti
FH	10	Veronica Madia	(substituted off) 71'
SH	9	Sofia Stefan	(substituted off) 71'
N8	8	Elisa Giordano (c)
OF	7	Beatrice Veronese	(substituted off) 65'
BF	6	Ilaria Arrighetti
RL	5	Giordana Duca
LL	4	Sara Tounesi	(substituted off) 61'
TP	3	Lucia Gai	(substituted off) 40'
HK	2	Melissa Bettoni	(substituted off) 71'
LP	1	Silvia Turani	(substituted off) 71'
Replacements:
HK	16	Vittoria Vecchini	(substituted on) 71'
PR	17	Gaia Maris	(substituted on) 40'
PR	18	Sara Seye	(substituted on) 71'
LK	19	Valeria Fedrighi	(substituted on) 61'
FL	20	Giada Franco	(substituted on) 65'
SH	21	Francesca Granzotto	(substituted on) 71'
FH	22	Alyssa D'Inca	(substituted on) 71'
FL	23	Manuela Furlan	(substituted on) 59'
Coach:
(Italy) Andrea Di Giandomenico

Assistant referees:
Julianne Zussman (Canada)
Kat Roche (USA)
Television match official:
Chris Assmus (Canada)

=== 30 July ===
30 July 2022

Japan	10–20	South Africa
Try: Otsuka 4' m Saito 80' m	Report	Try: Malinga (2) 33' m, 35' c Namba 77' m Con: Janse van Rensburg (1/3) 36'; Pen: Janse van Rensburg (1/1) 58'

Kumagaya Rugby Ground, Kumagaya
Referee: Maggie Cogger-Orr (New Zealand)

Team details

FB	15	Ria Anoku
RW	14	Hinano Nagura
OC	13	Mana Furuta
IC	12	Minori Yamamoto
LW	11	Riho Kurogi
FH	10	Ayasa Otsuka
SH	9	Megumi Abe
N8	8	Mateitoga Bogidraumainadave
OF	7	Iroha Nagata
BF	6	Seina Saito
RL	5	Masami Kawamura
LL	4	Kie Tamai
TP	3	Yuka Sadaka
HK	2	Nijiho Nagata
LP	1	Makoto Lavemai
Replacements:
PR	16	Saki Minami
HK	17	Misaki Suzuki
PR	18	Wako Kitano
LK	19	Otoka Yoshimura
FL	20	Ayano Nagai
SH	21	Kotono Yasuo
FH	22	Ayaka Suzuki
FL	23	Yuki Ito
Coach:
(Canada) Lesley McKenzie

FB	15	Nadine Roos
RW	14	Simamkele Namba
OC	13	Zintle Mphupa
IC	12	Aphiwe Ngwevu
LW	11	Ayanda Malinga
FH	10	Libbe Janse van Rensburg
SH	9	Tayla Kinsey
N8	8	Sizophila Solontsi
BF	7	Sinazo Mcatshulwa
OF	6	Lusandra Dumke
RL	5	Rights Mkhari
LL	4	Nolusindiso Booi (c)
TP	3	Babalwa Latsha
HK	2	Lindelwa Gwala
LP	1	Asithandile Ntoyanto
Replacements:
HK	16	Micke Gunter
PR	17	Yonela Ngxingolo
PR	18	Monica Mazibukwana
FL	19	Catha Jacobs
FL	20	Aseza Hele
SH	21	Unam Tose
FH	22	Chumisa Qawe
FL	23	Nomawethu Mabenge
Coach:
(South Africa) Stanley Raubenheimer

Assistant referees:
Shuhei Kubo (Japan)
Ano Kuwai (Japan

=== 13 August ===
13 August 2022
13:00 SAST (UTC+02)

South Africa	44–5	Spain
Try: Malinga (2) 13' c, 67' c Namba 36' c Roos 56' c Botes 62' c Con: Janse van Rensburg (5/5) 13', 36', 56', 62', 67'; Pen: Janse van Rensburg (3/3) 18', 27', 77'	Report	Try: Carmona 80' m Con: Ducher (0/1)

Ellis Park Stadium, Johannesburg
Referee: Clara Munarini (Italy)

Team details

FB	15	Nadine Roos
RW	14	Ayanda Malinga
OC	13	Zintle Mphupa	(substituted off) 68'
IC	12	Chumisa Qawe	(substituted off) 54'
LW	11	Simamkele Namba
FH	10	Libbe Janse van Rensburg
SH	9	Unam Tose	(substituted off) 60'
N8	8	Aseza Hele	(substituted off) 51'
BF	7	Rights Mkhari
OF	6	Sizophila Solontsi
RL	5	Catha Jacobs
LL	4	Nolusindiso Booi (c)
TP	3	Babalwa Latsha	(substituted off) 60'
HK	2	Lindelwa Gwala	(substituted off) 51'
LP	1	Asithandile Ntoyanto	(substituted off) 51'
Replacements:
HK	16	Roseline Botes	(substituted on) 51'
PR	17	Yonela Ngxingolo	(substituted on) 51'
PR	18	Monica Mazibukwana	(substituted on) 60'
LK	19	Lerato Makua
FL	20	Lusanda Dumke	(substituted on) 51'
SH	21	Rumandi Potgieter	(substituted on) 60'
FH	22	Zenay Jordaan	(substituted on) 54'
FL	23	Chuma Qawe	(substituted on) 68'
Coach:
(South Africa) Stanley Raubenheimer

FB	15	Cristina Lopez		(substituted off) 39'
RW	14	Marta Carmona
OC	13	Alba Vinuesa		(substituted off) 61'
IC	12	Lea Ducher
LW	11	Clara Piquero
FH	10	Inés Bueso-Inchausti
SH	9	Lucia Diaz		(substituted off) 48'
N8	8	Lourdes Alameda
OF	7	Maria Calvo
BF	6	Carmen Rodera		(substituted off) 54'
RL	5	Mónica Castelo		(substituted off) 37'
LL	4	Anna Puig
TP	3	Laura Delgado (c)		(substituted off) 59'
HK	2	Cristina Blanco		(substituted off) 48'
LP	1	Marta Estelles		(substituted off) 54'
Replacements:
PR	16	Maria del Castillo		(substituted on) 54'
HK	17	Maria de la Huertas Roman		(substituted on) 48'
PR	18	Sidorella Bracic		(substituted on) 59'
LK	19	Carmen Castellucci		(substituted on) 37'
FL	20	Alba Capell		(substituted on) 54'
SH	21	Julia Castro		(substituted on) 48'
FH	Blanca Ruiz		(substituted on) 39'
FL	23	Zahia Pérez		(substituted on) 61'
Coach:
(Spain) José Antonio Barro

Assistant Referees:
Aurélie Groizeleau (France)
Doriane Domenjo (France)
Television match official:
Ian Tempest (England)

=== 19 August ===
19 August 2022
15:00 SAST (UTC+02)

South Africa	37–14	Spain
Try: Botes 9' m Mabenge 39' m Mcatshulwa 46' c Roos 55' c Dumke 69' c Con: Jordaan (1/3) 46'; Janse van Rensburg (2/2) 55', 69'; Drop: Janse van Rensburg (2) 65', 80'	Report	Try: Penalty try 18'; Capell 22' c Con: Bueso-Inchausti (1/1) 23'

Fanie du Toit Stadium, Potchefstroom
Referee: Aurélie Groizeleau (France)

Team details

FB	15	Nadine Roos
RW	14	Nomawethu Mabenge	(yellow card) 58'
OC	13	Zintle Mphupa
IC	12	Aphiwe Ngwevu
LW	11	Simamkele Namba
FH	10	Zenay Jordaan		(substituted off) 52'
SH	9	Unam Tose		(substituted off) 52'
N8	8	Aseza Hele		(substituted off) 65'
BF	7	Sinazo Mcatshulwa
OF	6	Lusanda Dumke
RL	5	Catha Jacobs	(yellow card) 18'	(substituted off) 55'
LL	4	Lerato Makua	(yellow card) 31'
TP	3	Babalwa Latsha (c)
HK	2	Roseline Botes		(substituted off) 60'
LP	1	Yonela Ngxingolo
Replacements:
HK	16	Lindelwa Gwala		(substituted on) 60'
PR	17	Sanelisiwe Charlie
PR	18	Azisa Mkiva
LK	19	Nompumelelo Mathe		(substituted on) 55'
FL	20	Sizophila Solontsi		(substituted on) 65'
SH	21	Rumandi Potgieter		(substituted on) 52'
FH	22	Libbe Janse van Rensburg		(substituted on) 52'
FL	23	Chuma Qawe
Coach:
(South Africa) Stanley Raubenheimer

FB	15	Claudia Peña
RW	14	Alba Vinuesa
OC	13	Zahia Pérez
IC	12	Iciar Pozo
LW	11	Marta Carmona		(substituted off) 64'
FH	10	Inés Bueso-Inchausti		(substituted off) 60'
SH	9	Julia Castro		(substituted off) 50'
N8	8	Lourdes Alameda
OF	7	Alba Capell		(substituted off) 72'
BF	6	Maria Calvo (c)
RL	5	Mónica Castelo
LL	4	Kasandra Sylla		(substituted off) 49'
TP	3	Sidorella Bracic		(substituted off) 49'
HK	2	Cristina Blanco		(substituted off) 46'
LP	1	Marta Estelles		(substituted off) 60'
Replacements:
PR	16	Aleuzenev Cid		(substituted on) 60'
HK	17	Marieta Roman		(substituted on) 46'
PR	18	Laura Delgado		(substituted on) 49'
LK	19	Anna Puig		(substituted on) 49'
FL	20	Lucia Gayoso		(substituted on) 72'
SH	21	Lucia Diaz		(substituted on) 50'
FH	22	Blanca Ruiz		(substituted on) 60'
WG	23	Clara Piquero	(yellow card) 68'	(substituted on) 64'
Coach:
(Spain) José Antonio Barro

Assistant referees:
Aimee Barrett-Theron (South Africa)
Doriane Domenjo (France)
Television match official:
Ian Tempest (England)

=== 20 August ===
20 August 2022
19:00 JST (UTC+09)

Japan	22–57	Ireland
Try: Suzuki 3' c Imakugi 5' m Lavemai 62' c Con: Otsuka (2/3) 3', 63'; Pen: Otsuka (1/1) 11'	Report	Try: Jones (3) 16' c, 41' m, 53' c Doyle 22' m Dalton 40' c Deely 56' c Pearse 68' m Scuffil-McCabe 71' c Hooban 79' c Con: O'Brien (6/9) 17', 40', 54', 69', 73', 80'

Shizuoka Stadium, Fukuroi
Referee: Lauren Jenner (New Zealand)

Team details

FB	15	Ria Anoku
RW	14	Riho Kurogi
OC	13	Rinka Matsuda
IC	12	Shione Nakayama		(substituted off) 62'
LW	11	Komachi Imakugi
FH	10	Ayasa Otsuka
SH	9	Moe Tsukui		(substituted off) 59'
N8	8	Ayano Nagai		(substituted off) 50'
OF	7	Kyoko Hosokawa		(substituted off) 66'
BF	6	Misaki Suzuki
RL	5	Maki Takano		(substituted off) 73'
LL	4	Kie Tamai	(yellow card) 80'
TP	3	Yuka Sadaka		(substituted off) 40'
HK	2	Nijiho Nagata		(substituted off) 68'
LP	1	Saki Minami (c)		(substituted off) 59'
Replacements:
PR	16	Hinata Komaki		(substituted on) 59'
HK	17	Kotomi Taniguchi		(substituted on) 68'
PR	18	Makoto Lavemai		(substituted on) 40'
LK	19	Masami Kawamura		(substituted on) 66'
FL	20	Seina Saito		(substituted on) 50'
SH	21	Megumi Abe		(substituted on) 59'
FH	22	Minori Yamamoto		(substituted on) 62'
LK	23	Sakurako Korai		(substituted on) 73'
Coach:
(Canada) Lesley McKenzie

FB	15	Méabh Deely
RW	14	Natasja Behan
OC	13	Aoife Dalton
IC	12	Enya Breen
LW	11	Aoife Doyle	(substituted off) 62'
FH	10	Dannah O'Brien
SH	9	Ailsa Hughes	(substituted off) 62'
N8	8	Hannah O'Connor	(substituted off) 51'
OF	7	Edel McMahon
BF	6	Dorothy Wall
RL	5	Sam Monaghan
LL	4	Nichola Fryday (c)	(substituted off) 72'
TP	3	Katie O'Dwyer	(substituted off) 51'
HK	2	Neve Jones	(substituted off) 67'
LP	1	Linda Djougang	(substituted off) 67'
Replacements:
HK	16	Emma Hooban	(substituted on) 67'
PR	17	Chloe Pearse	(substituted on) 67'
PR	18	Christy Haney	(substituted on) 51'
LK	19	Taryn Schultzer	(substituted on) 72'
FL	20	Grace Moore	(substituted on) 51'
SH	21	Nicole Cronin	(substituted on) 62'
FH	22	Leah Tarpey	(substituted on) 63'
WG	23	Molly Scuffil-McCabe	(substituted on) 62'
Coach:
(Ireland) Greg McWilliams

Assistant referees:
Tasuku Kawahara (Japan)
Eri Kamimura (Japan)

Notes

- Dannah O'Brien, Aoife Dalton, Natasja Behan, Méabh Deely, Taryn Schultzer and Leah Tarpey (Ireland) made their international debuts.

20 August 2022
19:05 NZST (UTC+12)

New Zealand	52–5	Australia
Try: Demant (2) 17' c, 49' c Ngan-Woo 23' m du Plessis 30' c Cocksedge 32' c Leti-I'iga (2) 45' c, 55' m Connor 75' c Con: Cocksedge (3/4) 14', 29', 45'; Holmes (3/4) 32', 49', 75'	Report	Try: Duck 80' m Con: McKenzie (0/1)

Rugby League Park, Christchurch
Referee: Maggie Cogger-Orr (New Zealand)

Team details

FB	15	Renee Holmes
RW	14	Ruby Tui
OC	13	Amy du Plessis	(substituted off) 70'
IC	12	Theresa Fitzpatrick	(substituted off) 76'
LW	11	Ayesha Leti-I'iga
FH	10	Ruahei Demant (c)
SH	9	Kendra Cocksedge	(substituted off) 46'
N8	8	Charmaine McMenamin	(substituted off) 53'
OF	7	Kennedy Simon (c)
BF	6	Alana Bremner
RL	5	Chelsea Bremner
LL	4	Joanah Ngan-Woo	(substituted off) 60'
TP	3	Tanya Kalounivale	(substituted off) 47'
HK	2	Georgia Ponsonby	(substituted off) 47'
LP	1	Phillipa Love	(substituted off) 47'
Replacements:
HK	16	Luka Connor	(substituted on) 47'
PR	17	Awhina Tangen-Wainohu	(substituted on) 47'
PR	18	Amy Rule	(substituted on) 47'
LK	19	Tafito Lafaele	(substituted on) 60'
FL	20	Kendra Reynolds	(substituted on) 53'
SH	21	Tyla Nathan-Wong	(substituted on) 46'
CE	22	Sylvia Brunt	(substituted on) 70'
CE	23	Hazel Tubic	(substituted on) 76'
Coach:
(New Zealand) Wayne Smith

FB	15	Pauline Piliae-Rasabale
RW	14	Mahalia Murphy	(substituted off) 57'
OC	13	Georgie Friedrichs
IC	12	Cecilia Smith	(substituted off) 51'
LW	11	Ivania Wong
FH	10	Arabella McKenzie
SH	9	Iliseva Batibasaga	(substituted off) 60'
N8	8	Grace Kemp
OF	7	Shannon Parry (c)	(substituted off) 59'
BF	6	Emily Chancellor
RL	5	Kaitlan Leaney	(substituted off) 59'
LL	4	Michaela Leonard
TP	3	Bridie O'Gorman	(substituted off) 59'
HK	2	Ashley Marsters	(substituted off) 51'
LP	1	Bree-Anna Cheatham	(substituted off) 51'
Replacements:
HK	16	Adiana Talakai	(substituted on) 51'
PR	17	Emily Robinson	(substituted on) 51'
PR	18	Asoiva Karpani	(substituted on) 59'
LK	19	Atasi Lafai	(substituted on) 59'
FL	20	Piper Duck	(substituted on) 59'
SH	21	Layne Morgan	(substituted on) 60'
CE	22	Trilleen Pomare	(substituted on) 51'
FB	23	Lori Cramer	(substituted on) 57'
Coach:
(Australia) Jay Tregonning

Assistant referees:
Amber McLachlan (Australia)
Tyler Miller (Australia)
Television match official:
Lee Jeffrey (New Zealand)

Notes:

- Awhina Tangen-Wainohu and Tyla Nathan-Wong (New Zealand) and Bree-Anna Cheatham (Australia) made their international debuts.
- With this win New Zealand retained the Laurie O'Reilly Cup

=== 27 August ===
27 August 2022
12:15 ACST (UTC+09:30)

Australia	14–22	New Zealand
Try: Terita (2) 11' c, 80' c Con: McKenzie (2/2) 12', 81'	Report	Try: Connor 25' c Ngan-Woo 51' c Reynolds 64' m Con: Demant (2/3) 27', 52'; Pen: Demant (1/1) 20'

Adelaide Oval, Adelaide
Referee: Amber McLachlan (Australia)

Team details

FB	15	Pauline Piliae-Rasabale		(substituted off) 69'
RW	14	Bienne Terita
OC	13	Georgie Friedrichs
IC	12	Siokapesi Palu
LW	11	Ivania Wong		(substituted off) 53'
FH	10	Arabella McKenzie
SH	9	Iliseva Batibasaga		(substituted off) 67'
N8	8	Grace Hamilton
OF	7	Shannon Parry (c)		(substituted off) 67'
BF	6	Emily Chancellor
RL	5	Michaela Leonard		(substituted off) 60'
LL	4	Atasi Lafai	(yellow card) 28'
TP	3	Asoiva Karpani		(substituted off) 33'	(substituted on) 77'
HK	2	Adiana Talakai		(substituted off) 55'
LP	1	Liz Patu		(substituted off) 33'
Replacements:
HK	16	Ashley Marsters		(substituted on) 55'
PR	17	Emily Robinson		(substituted on) 33'	(substituted off) 77'
PR	18	Bridie O'Gorman		(substituted on) 33'
LK	19	Kaitlan Leaney		(substituted on) 60'
FL	20	Piper Duck		(substituted on) 67'
SH	21	Layne Morgan		(substituted on) 67'
FH	22	Trilleen Pomare		(substituted on) 53'
FB	23	Lori Cramer		(substituted on) 69'
Coach:
(Australia) Jay Tregonning

FB	15	Grace Steinmetz
RW	14	Ruby Tui
OC	13	Sylvia Brunt
IC	12	Chelsea Semple	(yellow card) 12'	(substituted off) 24'
LW	11	Ayesha Leti-I'iga
FH	10	Ruahei Demant (c)
SH	9	Ariana Bayler		(substituted off) 50'
N8	8	Kennedy Simon (c)		(substituted off) 29'
OF	7	Kendra Reynolds
BF	6	Alana Bremner
RL	5	Joanah Ngan-Woo		(substituted off) 60'
LL	4	Maiakawanakaulani Roos
TP	3	Tanya Kalounivale		(substituted off) 46'
HK	2	Luka Connor		(substituted off) 61'
LP	1	Phillipa Love		(substituted off) 50'
Replacements:
HK	16	Natalie Delamere		(substituted on) 61'
PR	17	Krystal Murray		(substituted on) 50'
PR	18	Santo Taumata		(substituted on) 46'
LK	19	Chelsea Bremner		(substituted on) 60'
FL	20	Charmaine McMenamin		(substituted on) 29'
SH	21	Arihiana Marino-Tauhinu		(substituted on) 50'
FB	22	Renee Holmes
FB	23	Hazel Tubic		(substituted on) 24'
Coach:
(New Zealand) Wayne Smith

Assistant referees:
Maggie Cogger-Orr (New Zealand)
Tyler Miller (Australia)
Television match official:
Lee Jeffrey (New Zealand)

Notes:

- Grace Steinmetz and Santo Taumata (New Zealand) and Siokapesi Palu and Bienne Terita (Australia) made their international debuts

27 August 2022
19:00 JST (UTC+09)

Japan	29–10	Ireland
Try: Otsuka 16' m Matsuda (2) 34' c, 55' m Nagura 49' m Kato 65' c Con: Otsuka (2/5) 35', 66'	Report	Try: Behan 3' m O'Dwyer 59' m Con: O'Brien (0/2)

Prince Chichibu Memorial Stadium, Tokyo
Referee: Lauren Jenner (New Zealand)

Team details

FB	15	Rinka Matsuda
RW	14	Hinano Nagura
OC	13	Mana Furuta
IC	12	Shione Nakayama	(substituted off) 77'
LW	11	Komachi Imakugi
FH	10	Ayasa Otsuka
SH	9	Megumi Abe	(substituted off) 64'
N8	8	Ayano Nagai	(substituted off) 55'
OF	7	Iroha Nagata
BF	6	Seina Saito
RL	5	Maki Takano	(substituted off) 50'
LL	4	Yuna Sato	(substituted off) 64'
TP	3	Yuka Sadaka	(substituted off) 50'
HK	2	Nijiho Nagata	(substituted off) 60'
LP	1	Saki Minami (c)	(substituted off) 50'
Replacements:
HK	16	Makoto Lavemai	(substituted on) 60'
PR	17	Kotomi Taniguchi	(substituted on) 50'
PR	18	Sachiko Kato	(substituted on) 50'
LK	19	Kie Tamai	(substituted on) 50'
LK	20	Otoka Yoshimura	(substituted on) 64'
SH	21	Moe Tsukui	(substituted on) 64'
CE	22	Minori Yamamoto	(substituted on) 77'
FL	23	Kyoko Hosokawa	(substituted on) 55'
Coach:
(Canada) Lesley McKenzie

FB	15	Méabh Deely
RW	14	Natasja Behan	(substituted off) 74'
OC	13	Aoife Dalton	(substituted off) 76'
IC	12	Enya Breen
LW	11	Aoife Doyle
FH	10	Dannah O'Brien
SH	9	Ailsa Hughes	(substituted off) 56'
N8	8	Grace Moore
OF	7	Edel McMahon
BF	6	Jo Brown	(substituted off) 74'
RL	5	Nichola Fryday (c)
LL	4	Hannah O'Connor	(substituted off) 74'
TP	3	Linda Djougang	(substituted off) 69'
HK	2	Neve Jones	(substituted off) 69'
LP	1	Laura Feely	(substituted off) 46'
Replacements:
HK	16	Emma Hooban	(substituted on) 69'
PR	17	Chloe Pearse	(substituted on) 69'
PR	18	Katie O'Dwyer	(substituted on) 46'
LK	19	Taryn Schultzer	(substituted on) 74'
FL	20	Jess Keating	(substituted on) 74'
FH	21	Molly Scuffil-McCabe	(substituted on) 74'
SH	22	Leah Tarpey	(substituted on) 56'
WG	23	Emma Tilly	(substituted on) 74'
Coach:
(Ireland) Greg McWilliams

Assistant referees:
Tasuku Kawahara (Japan)
Eri Kamimura (Japan)

Notes:

- Jo Brown and Emma Tilly (Ireland) made their international debuts.
- Brown had previously represented England, but switched international her allegiance to Ireland prior to this match

27 August 2022
16:00 BST (UTC+01)

Scotland	17–21	United States
Try: Skeldon 6' c Lloyd 18' c Con: Nelson (2/2) 8', 19'; Pen: Nelson 42'	Report	Try: Rogers (2) 16' m, 63' m Zackary 18' m Con: Cantorna (0/2); Kelter (0/1); Pen: Kelter (1/1) 12'; Cantorna (1/1) 25'

Edinburgh Rugby Stadium, Edinburgh
Referee: Joy Neville (Ireland)

Team details

FB	15	Chloe Rollie
RW	14	Rhona Lloyd
OC	13	Emma Orr
IC	12	Lisa Thomson
LW	11	Hannah Smith	(substituted off) 70'
FH	10	Helen Nelson	(substituted off) 61'
SH	9	Caity Mattinson	(substituted off) 61'
N8	8	Evie Gallagher	(substituted off) 40'
OF	7	Louise McMillan
BF	6	Rachel Malcolm (c)
RL	5	Sarah Bonar	(substituted off) 56'
LL	4	Emma Wassell
TP	3	Christine Belisle	(substituted off) 44'
HK	2	Lana Skeldon	(substituted off) 56'
LP	1	Molly Wright	(substituted off) 44'
Replacements:
PR	16	Jodie Rettie	(substituted on) 56'
HK	17	Leah Bartlett	(substituted on) 44'
PR	18	Elliann Clark	(substituted on) 44'
LK	19	Rachel McLachlan	(substituted on) 56'
FL	20	Jade Konkel	(substituted on) 40'
SH	21	Mairi McDonald	(substituted on) 61'
FH	22	Meryl Smith	(substituted on) 61'
WG	23	Shona Campbell	(substituted on) 70'
Coach:
(Scotland) Bryan Easson

FB	15	Alev Kelter
RW	14	Jennine Detiveaux
OC	13	Eti Haungatau	(substituted off) 59'
IC	12	Katana Howard	(substituted off) 64'
LW	11	Lotte Clapp
FH	10	Gabby Cantorna
SH	9	Olivia Ortiz	(substituted off) 72'
N8	8	Kate Zackary (c)
OF	7	Rachel Johnson
BF	6	Jordan Matyas	(substituted off) 72'
RL	5	Jenny Kronish	(substituted off) 59'
LL	4	Hallie Taufo'ou
TP	3	Nick James	(substituted off) 65'
HK	2	Joanna Kitlinski
LP	1	Hope Rogers	(substituted off) 72'
Replacements:
HK	16	Jett Hayward
PR	17	Catie Benson	(substituted on) 72'
PR	18	Charli Jacoby	(substituted on) 65'
LK	19	Evi Ashenbrucker	(substituted on) 59'
FL	20	Georgie Perris-Redding	(substituted on) 72'
SH	21	Carly Waters	(substituted on) 72'
CE	22	Meya Bizer	(substituted on) 59'
CE	23	Tess Feury	(substituted on) 64'
Coach:
(United States) Rob Cain

Assistant referees:
Hollie Davidson (Scotland)
Nikki O'Donnell (England)
Television match official:
Ben Whitehouse (Wales)

27 August 2022
17:00 ADT (UTC-03)

Canada	31–3	Wales
Try: Farries (2) 18' c, 43' c Forteza 23' m Grant 35' m Pelletier 68' c Con: Miller (2/3) 20', 44' de Goede (1/2) 69'	Report	Pen: Snowsill (1/1) 9'

Wanderers Grounds, Halifax
Referee: Aimee Barrett-Theron (South Africa)

Team details

FB	15	Elissa Alarie
RW	14	Paige Farries
OC	13	Sara Kaljuvee
IC	12	Alexandra Tessier	(substituted off) 68'
LW	11	Maddy Grant
FH	10	Taylor Perry
SH	9	Brianna Miller	(substituted off) 58'
N8	8	Sophie de Goede (c)
OF	7	Karen Paquin	(substituted off) 70'
BF	6	Fabiola Forteza
RL	5	Tyson Beukeboom
LL	4	Courtney Holtkamp	(substituted off) 50'
TP	3	DaLeaka Menin	(substituted off) 50'
HK	2	Emily Tuttosi	(substituted off) 50'
LP	1	Olivia DeMerchant	(substituted off) 40'
Replacements:
HK	16	Laura Russell	(substituted on) 50'
PR	17	Brittany Kassil	(substituted on) 40'
PR	18	Alex Ellis	(substituted on) 50'
LK	19	Emma Taylor	(substituted on) 50'
FL	20	Ngalula Fuamba	(substituted on) 47'
SH	21	Sara Svoboda	(substituted on) 70'
FH	22	Justine Pelletier	(substituted on) 58'
FL	23	Julia Schell	(substituted on) 68'
Coach:
(Canada) Kevin Rouet

FB	15	Kayleigh Powell
RW	14	Jasmine Joyce	(substituted off) 52'
OC	13	Carys Williams-Morris
IC	12	Hannah Jones (c)
LW	11	Lowri Norkett
FH	10	Elinor Snowsill	(substituted off) 60'
SH	9	Ffion Lewis	(substituted off) 70'
N8	8	Sioned Harries
OF	7	Manon Johnes	(substituted off) 46'
BF	6	Beth Lewis
RL	5	Natalia John	(substituted off) 40'
LL	4	Abbie Fleming
TP	3	Donna Rose	(substituted off) 60'
HK	2	Kat Evans	(substituted off) 45'
LP	1	Cara Hope	(substituted off) 45'
Replacements:
HK	16	Kelsey Jones	(substituted on) 45'
PR	17	Caryl Thomas	(substituted on) 45'
PR	18	Sisilia Tuipulotu	(substituted on) 60'
LK	19	Georgia Evans	(substituted on) 40'
FL	20	Siwan Lillicrap	(substituted on) 46'
SH	21	Eloise Hayward	(substituted on) 70'
FH	22	Lleucu George	(substituted on) 60'
WG	23	Caitlin Lewis	(substituted on) 52'
Coach:
(Wales) Ioan Cunningham

Assistant referees:
Julianne Zussman (Canada)
Kat Roche (United States)
Television match official:
Chris Assmus (Canada)

=== 3 September ===
3 September 2022
15:00 BST (UTC+01)

England	52–14	United States
Try: Hunt 4' m Breach (2) 7' c, 32' c Cokayne (2) 22' c, 56' m MacDonald (2) 28' c, 49' c Kildunne 72' c Con: Scarratt (5/7) 9', 24', 29', 33', 51'; Harrison (1/1) 74'	Report	Try: Rogers 67' c Penalty try 71'; Con: Cantorna (1/1) 68'

Sandy Park, Exeter
Attendance: 10,907
Referee: Aurélie Groizeleau (France)

Team details

FB	15	Ellie Kildunne
RW	14	Jess Breach
OC	13	Emily Scarratt (c)		(substituted off) 61'
IC	12	Tatyana Heard		(substituted off) 61'
LW	11	Claudia MacDonald
FH	10	Zoe Harrison
SH	9	Natasha Hunt		(substituted off) 40'
N8	8	Poppy Cleall		(substituted off) 53'
OF	7	Sadia Kabeya
BF	6	Zoe Aldcroft
RL	5	Catherine O'Donnell
LL	4	Rosie Galligan		(substituted off) 75'
TP	3	Bryony Cleall		(substituted off) 54'	(substituted on) 75'
HK	2	Amy Cokayne		(substituted off) 57'
LP	1	Hannah Botterman		(substituted off) 57'
Replacements:
PR	16	Connie Powell		(substituted on) 57'
HK	17	Maud Muir		(substituted on) 57'
PR	18	Shaunagh Brown	(yellow card) 69'	(substituted on) 54'
LK	19	Morwena Talling
FL	20	Victoria Fleetwood		(substituted on) 53'
SH	21	Leanne Infante		(substituted on) 40'
FH	22	Helena Rowland	(yellow card) 71'	(substituted on) 61'
CE	23	Holly Aitchison		(substituted on) 61'
Coach:
(England) Simon Middleton

FB	15	Alev Kelter
RW	14	Jennine Detiveaux
OC	13	Meya Bizer
IC	12	Katana Howard		(substituted off) 45'
LW	11	Lotte Clapp
FH	10	Gabby Cantorna		(substituted off) 74'
SH	9	Olivia Ortiz		(substituted off) 55'
N8	8	Kate Zackary (c)
OF	7	Georgie Perris-Redding
BF	6	Rachel Johnson		(substituted off) 74'
RL	5	Kristine Sommer		(substituted off) 60'
LL	4	Hallie Taufo'ou	(yellow card) 21'
TP	3	Nick James		(substituted off) 53'
HK	2	Joanna Kitlinski		(substituted off) 75'
LP	1	Hope Rogers		(substituted off) 71'
Replacements:
HK	16	Kathryn Treder		(substituted on) 75'
PR	17	Catie Benson		(substituted on) 71'
PR	18	Charli Jacoby		(substituted on) 53'
LK	19	Evi Ashenbrucker		(substituted on) 60'
FL	20	Elizabeth Cairns		(substituted on) 74'
SH	21	Carly Waters		(substituted on) 55'
FH	22	Megan Foster		(substituted on) 74'
WG	23	Tess Feury		(substituted on) 45'
Coach:
(United States) Rob Cain

Player of the Match:
Claudia MacDonald (England)

Assistant referees:
Doriane Domenjo (France)
Maria Beatrice Benvenuti (Italy)
Television match official:
Ben Whitehouse (Wales)

Notes:

- With this win, England women equalled the record for the most consecutive wins by a test rugby team.

3 September 2022
18:00 CEST (UTC+02)

France	21–0	Italy
Try: Sansus 6' c Ferer 13' c Deshayes 23' c Con: Drouin (3/3) 7', 14', 23'	Report

Stade des Arboras, Nice
Referee: Sara Cox (England)

Team details

FB	15	Émilie Boulard
RW	14	Mélissande Llorens
OC	13	Maëlle Filopon	(substituted off) 64'
IC	12	Chloé Jacquet
LW	11	Marine Ménager
FH	10	Caroline Drouin	(substituted off) 72'
SH	9	Laure Sansus	(substituted off) 57'
N8	8	Romane Ménager
OF	7	Gaëlle Hermet (c)	(substituted off) 51'
BF	6	Charlotte Escudero
RL	5	Madoussou Fall	(substituted off) 70'
LL	4	Céline Ferer
TP	3	Clara Joyeux	(substituted off) 57'
HK	2	Agathe Sochat	(substituted off) 57'
LP	1	Annaëlle Deshayes	(substituted off) 57'
Replacements:
HK	16	Célia Domain	(substituted on) 57'
PR	17	Coco Lindelauf	(substituted on) 57'
PR	18	Rose Bernadou	(substituted on) 57'
LK	19	Safi N'Diaye	(substituted on) 70'
FL	20	Julie Annery	(substituted on) 51'
SH	21	Pauline Bourdon	(substituted on) 57'
FH	22	Lina Queyroi	(substituted on) 64'
CE	23	Gabrielle Vernier	(substituted on) 72'
Coach:
Thomas Darracq Hayraud

FB	15	Manuela Furlan (c)
RW	14	Aura Muzzo
OC	13	Michela Sillari		(substituted off) 45'
IC	12	Alyssa D'Incà		(substituted off) 67'
LW	11	Maria Magatti	(yellow card) 35'
FH	10	Beatrice Rigoni
SH	9	Sara Barattin		(substituted off) 58'
N8	8	Elisa Giordano
OF	7	Giada Franco		(substituted off) 49'
BF	6	Ilaria Arrighetti		(substituted off) 65'
RL	5	Giordana Duca
LL	4	Valeria Fedrighi
TP	3	Lucia Gai		(substituted off) 63'
HK	2	Melissa Bettoni		(substituted off) 63'
LP	1	Silvia Turani		(substituted off) 63'
Replacements:
HK	16	Vittoria Vecchini		(substituted on) 63'
PR	17	Gaia Maris		(substituted on) 63'
PR	18	Sara Seye		(substituted on) 63'
LK	19	Isabella Locatelli		(substituted on) 65'
FL	20	Francesca Sgorbini		(substituted on) 49'
SH	21	Sofia Stefan		(substituted on) 58'
FH	22	Emma Stevanin		(substituted on) 67'
CE	23	Vittoria Ostuni Minuzzi		(substituted on) 45'
Coach:
Andrea Di Giandomenico

Assistant referees:
Nikki O'Donnell (England)
Holly Wood (England)
Television match official:
Ian Tempest (England)

=== 9 September ===
9 September 2022
19:00 CEST (UTC+02)

Italy	26–19	France
Try: Bettoni 34' m Sillari 38' c Ostuni Minuzzi 45' c Penalty try 75'; Con: Rigoni (2/3) 40', 47'	Report	Try: Fall 5' c R. Ménager 30' c Llorens 69' m Con: Drouin (2/3) 9', 31'

Stadio del Rugby, Biella
Referee: Joy Neville (Ireland)

Team details

FB	15	Vittoria Ostuni Minuzzi
RW	14	Aura Muzzo
OC	13	Michela Sillari	(substituted off) 40'
IC	12	Beatrice Rigoni
LW	11	Maria Magatti	(substituted off) 67'
FH	10	Veronica Madia	(substituted off) 78'
SH	9	Sofia Stefan
N8	8	Elisa Giordano
OF	7	Francesca Sgorbini	(substituted off) 63'
BF	6	Isabella Locatelli	(substituted off) 53'
RL	5	Giordana Duca
LL	4	Valeria Fedrighi
TP	3	Lucia Gai	(substituted off) 60'
HK	2	Melissa Bettoni (c)	(substituted off) 67'
LP	1	Gaia Maris
Replacements:
HK	16	Vittoria Vecchini	(substituted on) 67'
PR	17	Emanuela Stecca
PR	18	Sara Seye	(substituted on) 60'
LK	19	Sara Tounesi	(substituted on) 63'
FL	20	Giada Franco	(substituted on) 53'
SH	21	Francesca Granzotto	(substituted on) 67'
FH	22	Emma Stevanin	(substituted on) 78'
CE	23	Alyssa D'Incà	(substituted on) 40'
Coach:
Andrea Di Giandomenico

FB	15	Chloé Jacquet
RW	14	Mélissande Llorens
OC	13	Marine Ménager		(substituted off) 45'
IC	12	Caroline Drouin		(substituted off) 67'
LW	11	Émilie Boulard
FH	10	Lina Queyroi	(yellow card) 75'
SH	9	Pauline Bourdon		(substituted off) 47'
N8	8	Romane Ménager
OF	7	Emeline Gros		(substituted off) 57'
BF	6	Manae Feleu
RL	5	Madoussou Fall
LL	4	Céline Ferer
TP	3	Rose Bernadou		(substituted off) 40'
HK	2	Agathe Sochat (c)		(substituted off) 47'
LP	1	Annaëlle Deshayes		(substituted off) 61'
Replacements:
HK	16	Laure Touyé		(substituted on) 47'
PR	17	Yllana Brosseau		(substituted on) 61'
PR	18	Clara Joyeux		(substituted on) 40'
LK	19	Audrey Forlani
FL	20	Marjorie Mayans		(substituted on) 57'
SH	21	Laure Sansus		(substituted on) 47'
FH	22	Jessy Trémoulière
CE	23	Caroline Boujard
Coach:
Thomas Darracq

Assistant referees:
Nikki O'Donnell (England)
Holly Wood (England)
Television match official:
Ian Tempest (England

=== 11 September ===
11 September 2022
15:00 BST (UTC+01)

Scotland	N/A (Cancelled)	Spain

Edinburgh Rugby Stadium, Edinburgh
Referee: Sara Cox (England)

Notes

- This match was cancelled as a result of the death of Queen Elizabeth II.

=== 14 September ===
14 September 2022
19:30 BST (UTC+01)

England	73–7	Wales
Try: Rowland (3) 8' c, 46' m, 58' c Scarratt (2) 21' c, 53' c Packer 27' c Penalty try 36'; Kildunne 41' m Cokayne 42' c Botterman 65' c Matthews 74' c Con: Scarratt (5/7) 9', 22', 28', 43', 55'; Rowland (2/2) 58', 65'; Reed (1/1) 75'	Report	Try: Crabb 15'; Con: Snowsill (1/1) 15'

Ashton Gate Stadium, Bristol
Attendance: 11,691
Referee: Aurélie Groizeleau (France)

Team details

FB	15	Ellie Kildunne
RW	14	Lydia Thompson
OC	13	Emily Scarratt	(substituted off) 57'
IC	12	Helena Rowland	(substituted off) 70'
LW	11	Sarah McKenna
FH	10	Zoe Harrison	(substituted off) 57'
SH	9	Lucy Packer	(substituted off) 57'
N8	8	Sarah Hunter (c)	(substituted off) 57'
OF	7	Marlie Packer	(substituted off) 56'
BF	6	Alex Matthews
RL	5	Abbie Ward
LL	4	Zoe Aldcroft
TP	3	Sarah Bern	(substituted off) 56'
HK	2	Lark Davies	(substituted off) 35'
LP	1	Vickii Cornborough	(substituted off) 56'
Replacements:
HK	16	Amy Cokayne	(substituted on) 35'
PR	17	Hannah Botterman	(substituted on) 56'
PR	18	Maud Muir	(substituted on) 56'
LK	19	Sarah Beckett	(substituted on) 56'
FL	20	Poppy Cleall	(substituted on) 57'
SH	21	Claudia MacDonald	(substituted on) 57'
FH	22	Amber Reed	(substituted on) 57'
FB	23	Holly Aitchison	(substituted on) 57'
Coach:
Simon Middleton

FB	15	Niamh Terry	(substituted off) 57'
RW	14	Lowri Norkett
OC	13	Carys Williams-Morris
IC	12	Hannah Jones (c)
LW	11	Jasmine Joyce
FH	10	Elinor Snowsill	(substituted off) 51'
SH	9	Ffion Lewis	(substituted off) 40'
N8	8	Sioned Harries	(substituted off) 51'
OF	7	Alex Callender
BF	6	Alisha Butchers
RL	5	Gwen Crabb
LL	4	Natalia John	(substituted off) 40'
TP	3	Cerys Hale	(substituted off) 51'
HK	2	Carys Phillips	(substituted off) 59'
LP	1	Gwenllian Pyrs
Replacements:
HK	16	Kelsey Jones	(substituted on) 59'
PR	17	Caryl Thomas
PR	18	Sisilia Tuipulotu	(substituted on) 51'
LK	19	Siwan Lillicrap	(substituted on) 40'
FL	20	Bethan Lewis	(substituted on) 51'
SH	21	Keira Bevan	(substituted on) 40'
FH	22	Lleucu George	(substituted on) 51'
CE	23	Megan Webb	(substituted on) 57'
Coach:
Ioan Cunningham

Assistant referees:
Joy Neville (Ireland)
Doriane Domenjo (France)
Television match official:
Olly Hodges (Ireland)

=== 16 September ===
16 September 2022
19:00 FJT (UTC+12)

Fiji	32–10	Wahine Māori
Try: Rubuti 5' m Radiniyavuni 11' m Naikore (3) 19' m, 29' m, 45' m Nakoci 62' c Con: Rokouono (1/6) 63'	Report	Try: Paraone 7' m Hohepa 37' m

HFC Bank Stadium, Suva

Team details

FB	15	Roela Radiniyavuni
RW	14	Ilisapeci Delaiwau
OC	13	Talei Wilson
IC	12	Vani Arei
LW	11	Vitalina Naikore
FH	10	Merewalesi Rokouono
SH	9	Ana Maria Roqica
N8	8	Sereima Leweniqila
OF	7	Ema Adivitaloga
BF	6	Karalaini Waisewa
RL	5	Sulita Waisega
LL	4	Asinate Serevi
TP	3	Mereoni Vonosere
HK	2	Bitila Tawake (c)
LP	1	Joma Rubuti
Replacements:
HK	16	Jiowana Sauto
PR	17	Iris Verebalavu
PR	18	Bulou Vasuturaga
LK	19	Merevesi Ofakimalino
FL	20	Akosita Ravato
SH	21	Fulori Nabura
FL	22	Timaima Ravisa
CE	23	Kolora Lomani
Coach:
Senirusi Seruvakula

Notes:

- Alowesi Nakoci was not named in the original matchday squad but went on to feature in the match.

=== 23 September ===
23 September 2022
18:00 FJT (UTC+12)

Fiji	7–24	Canada
Try: Sokoiwasa 52' c Con: Rokouono 52'	Report	Try: Kaljuvee 42' c Grant 57' m Beukeboom 62' m Boag 78' c Con: Miller (2/4) 43', 78'

HFC Bank Stadium, Suva

Team details

FB	15	Alowesi Nakoci
RW	14	Ana Naimasi
OC	13	Sesenieli Donu
IC	12	Raijieli Laqeretabua
LW	11	Vitalina Naikore
FH	10	Merewalesi Rokouono
SH	9	Lavena Cavuru
N8	8	Sereima Leweniqila (c)
OF	7	Ema Adivitaloga
BF	6	Karalaini Waisewa
RL	5	Merevesi Ofakimalino
LL	4	Asinate Serevi
TP	3	Mereoni Vonosere
HK	2	Bitila Tawake
LP	1	Joma Rubuti
Replacements:
HK	16	Jiowana Sauto
PR	17	Iris Verebalavu
PR	18	Bulou Vasuturaga
LK	19	Raijieli Daveua
FL	20	Rusila Nagasau
FH	21	Kolora Lomani
CE	22	Akanisi Sokoiwasa
WG	23	Roela Radiniyavuni
Coach:
Senirusi Seruvakula

FB	15	Elissa Alarie
RW	14	Maddy Grant
OC	13	Anaïs Holly
IC	12	Sara Kaljuvee
LW	11	Alysha Corrigan
FH	10	Julia Schell
SH	9	Brianna Miller
N8	8	Sophie de Goede (c)
OF	7	Karen Paquin
BF	6	Fabiola Forteza
RL	5	McKinley Hunt
LL	4	Courtney Holtkamp
TP	3	DaLeaka Menin
HK	2	Emily Tuttosi
LP	1	Brittany Kassil
Replacements:
HK	16	Gillian Boag
PR	17	Mikiela Nelson
PR	18	Alex Ellis
LK	19	Tyson Beukeboom
LK	20	Emma Taylor
FL	21	Gabrielle Senft
CE	22	Alexandra Tessier
WG	23	Taylor Perry
Coach:
Kévin Rouet

=== 24 September ===
24 September 2022
16:30 NZST (UTC+12)

New Zealand	95–12	Japan
Try: Cocksedge (2) 5' c, 8' c Woodman (7) 11'm, 14'c, 25'c, 41'm, 51'c, 54'c, 78'c Connor 16' c Hirini 33' m Holmes 45' c du Plessis 62' m Fluhler 67' m Tui 76' c Con: Cocksedge (5/5) 6', 9', 18', 46', 53'; Holmes (4/9) 15', 26', 55', 79'; Marino-Tauhinu (1/1) 77'	Report	Try: Saito 37' c Sadaka 58' m Con: Hirayama (1/1) 38'; Otsuka (0/1)

Eden Park, Auckland

Team details

FB	15	Renee Holmes
RW	14	Portia Woodman
OC	13	Amy du Plessis
IC	12	Theresa Fitzpatrick	(substituted off) 47'
LW	11	Ruby Tui
FH	10	Ruahei Demant (c)	(substituted off) 57'
SH	9	Kendra Cocksedge	(substituted off) 57'
N8	8	Charmaine McMenamin
OF	7	Sarah Hirini	(substituted off) 47'
BF	6	Liana Mikaele-Tu'u
RL	5	Chelsea Bremner	(substituted off) 61'
LL	4	Joanah Ngan-Woo
TP	3	Amy Rule	(substituted off) 57'
HK	2	Luka Connor	(substituted off) 57'
LP	1	Phillipa Love	(substituted off) 47'
Replacements:
HK	16	Georgia Ponsonby	(substituted on) 57'
PR	17	Awhina Tangen-Wainohu	(substituted on) 47'
PR	18	Santo Taumata	(substituted on) 57'
LK	19	Maiakawanakaulani Roos	(substituted on) 61'
FL	20	Kendra Reynolds	(substituted on) 47'
FH	21	Arihiana Marino-Tauhinu	(substituted on) 57'
CE	22	Stacey Fluhler	(substituted on) 47'
WG	23	Hazel Tubic	(substituted on) 57'
Coach:
Wayne Smith

FB	15	Ai Hirayama	(substituted off) 47'
RW	14	Hinano Nagura
OC	13	Mana Furuta	(substituted off) 64'
IC	12	Shione Nakayama
LW	11	Rinka Matsuda
FH	10	Ayasa Otsuka
SH	9	Megumi Abe
N8	8	Ayano Nagai
OF	7	Kyoko Hosokawa	(substituted off) 54'
BF	6	Seina Saito
RL	5	Maki Takano
LL	4	Yuna Sato	(substituted off) 62'
TP	3	Makoto Lavemai	(substituted off) 40'
HK	2	Nijiho Nagata	(substituted off) 54'
LP	1	Saki Minami (c)	(substituted off) 54'
Replacements:
PR	16	Sachiko Kato	(substituted on) 40'
HK	17	Kotomi Taniguchi	(substituted on) 54'
PR	18	Yuka Sadaka	(substituted on) 54'
LK	19	Kie Tamai	(substituted on) 62'
LK	20	Iroha Nagata	(substituted on) 54'
FL	21	Moe Tsukui
CE	22	Komachi Imakugi	(substituted on) 47'
WG	23	Yuki Ito	(substituted on) 64'
Coach:
Lesley McKenzie
