= 2021 Rugby World Cup Pool B =

Pool B of the 2021 Rugby World Cup began on 9 October 2022. The pool includes Canada and inaugural champions the United States, who finished 5th and 4th respectively in 2017. They are joined by Italy, who qualified as champions of the European Qualification Tournament, and by Japan, who qualified as the highest Asian team in the World Rankings following the cancellation of Asia Qualifying.

== Standings ==
Key to colours in pool tables
Advanced to the quarter-finals as one of the top two teams in a pool
Advanced to the quarter-finals as one of the two best third place teams

Pos	Team	Pld	W	D	L	PF	PA	PD	T	B	Pts
1	Canada	3	3	0	0	92	31	+61	16	3	15
2	Italy	3	2	0	1	55	40	+15	8	1	9
3	United States	3	1	0	2	54	68	−14	8	1	5
4	Japan	3	0	0	3	30	92	−62	5	0	0

== United States vs Italy ==
9 October 2022
12:45 NZDT (UTC+13)

United States	10–22	Italy (1 BP)
Try: Taufo'ou 3' m Kronish 57' m	Report	Try: Ostuni Minuzzi 39' c Muzzo (2) 51 m, 63' m Magatti 70' m Con: Sillari (1/4) 39'

Northland Events Centre, Whangārei
Referee: Hollie Davidson (Scotland)

Team details

FB	15	Alev Kelter
RW	14	Jennine Detiveaux
OC	13	Eti Haungatau
IC	12	Katana Howard	(substituted off) 64'
LW	11	Lotte Clapp
FH	10	Gabby Cantorna
SH	9	Carly Waters	(substituted off) 54'
N8	8	Kate Zackary (c)
OF	7	Rachel Johnson
BF	6	Jordan Matyas
RL	5	Jenny Kronish	(substituted off) 54'
LL	4	Hallie Taufo'ou	(substituted off) 40'
TP	3	Nick James	(substituted off) 68'
HK	2	Joanna Kitlinski
LP	1	Hope Rogers	(substituted off) 78'
Replacements:
HK	16	Kathryn Treder
PR	17	Catherine Benson	(substituted in) 78'
PR	18	Charli Jacoby	(substituted in) 68'
LK	19	Kristine Sommer	(substituted in) 40'
FL	20	Georgie Perris-Redding	(substituted in) 64'
SH	21	Olivia Ortiz	(substituted in) 64'
CE	22	Meya Bizer	(substituted in) 64'
WG	23	Tess Feury
Coach:
(England) Rob Cain

FB	15	Vittoria Ostuni Minuzzi	(yellow card) 57'
RW	14	Aura Muzzo
OC	13	Michela Sillari
IC	12	Beatrice Rigoni
LW	11	Maria Magatti
FH	10	Veronica Madia		(substituted off) 70'
SH	9	Sofia Stefan
N8	8	Elisa Giordano (c)
OF	7	Giada Franco		(substituted off) 71'
BF	6	Ilara Arrighetti		(substituted off) 3'
RL	5	Sara Tounesi		(substituted off) 71'
LL	4	Valeria Fedrighi
TP	3	Lucia Gai		(substituted off) 79'
HK	2	Melissa Bettoni		(substituted off) 79'
LP	1	Silvia Turani		(substituted off) 79'
Replacements:
HK	16	Vittoria Vecchini		(substituted in) 79'
PR	17	Gaia Maris		(substituted in) 79'
PR	18	Sara Seye		(substituted in) 79'
LK	19	Beatrice Veronsese		(substituted in) 71'
FL	20	Isabella Locatelli		(substituted in) 3'
FL	21	Franceca Sgorbini		(substituted in) 71'
SH	22	Sara Barattin		(substituted in) 70'
WG	23	Alyssa D'Incà
Coach:
(Italy) Andrea Di Giandomenico

Player of the Match:
Giada Franco (Italy)

Assistant referees:
Julianne Zussman (Canada)
Tyler Miller (Australia)
Television match official:
Ben Whitehouse (Wales)

Notes:

- This was Italy's first win over the United States.
- Giordana Duca was originally named as a lock for Italy, but withdrew before kickoff due to injury. She was replaced by Sara Tounesi while Beatrice Veronese took Tounesi's place onto the bench.

== Japan vs Canada ==
9 October 2022
15:15 NZDT (UTC+13)

Japan	5–41	Canada (1 BP)
Try: Takano 6' m	Report	Try: Farries 2' m Tuttosi (3) 15' c, 29' m, 50' c Miller (2) 24' m, 35' m Nelson 66' c Con: Miller (1/2) 16' de Goede (2/5) 51', 67'

Northland Events Centre, Whangārei
Referee: Joy Neville (Ireland)

Team details

FB	15	Rinka Matsuda
RW	14	Hinano Nagura
OC	13	Mana Furuta
IC	12	Shione Nakayama	(substituted off) 57'
LW	11	Komachi Imakugi
FH	10	Ayasa Otsuka
SH	9	Megumi Abe	(substituted off) 65'
N8	8	Ayano Nagai	(substituted off) 55'
OF	7	Iroha Nagata
BF	6	Seina Saito
RL	5	Maki Takano	(substituted off) 60'
LL	4	Yuna Sato	(substituted off) 51'
TP	3	Sachiko Kato	(substituted off) 65'
HK	2	Nijiho Nagata	(substituted off) 70'
LP	1	Saki Minami (c)	(substituted off) 48'
Replacements:
HK	16	Hinata Komaki	(substituted in) 70'
PR	17	Misaki Suzuki	(substituted in) 48'
PR	18	Makoto Lavemai	(substituted in) 65'
LK	19	Kie Tamai	(substituted in) 51'
FL	20	Otoka Yoshimura	(substituted in) 60'
SH	21	Moe Tsukui	(substituted in) 65'
FH	22	Minori Yamamoto	(substituted in) 57'
FL	23	Kyoko Hosokawa	(substituted in) 55'
Coach:
(Canada) Lesley McKenzie

FB	15	Elissa Alarie
RW	14	Maddy Grant
OC	13	Sara Kaljuvee
IC	12	Alex Tessier
LW	11	Paige Farries
FH	10	Julia Schell	(substituted off) 74'
SH	9	Brianna Miller	(substituted off) 52'
N8	8	Sophie de Goede (c)
OF	7	Karen Paquin	(substituted off) 58'
BF	6	Fabiola Forteza
RL	5	Tyson Beukeboom	(substituted off) 54'
LL	4	Courtney Holtkamp	(substituted off) 67'
TP	3	DaLeaka Menin	(substituted off) 51'
HK	2	Emily Tuttosi	(substituted off) 51'
LP	1	Brittany Kassil	(substituted off) 51'
Replacements:
HK	16	Gillian Boag	(substituted in) 51'
PR	17	Mikiela Nelson	(substituted in) 51'
PR	18	Alex Ellis	(substituted in) 51'
LK	19	Ngalula Fuamba	(substituted in) 54'
LK	20	Emma Taylor	(substituted in) 67'
FL	21	Gabby Senft	(substituted in) 58'
SH	22	Justine Pelletier	(substituted in) 51'
WG	23	Anaïs Holly	(substituted in) 74'
Coach:
(France) Kévin Rouet

Player of the Match:
Emily Tuttosi (Canada)

Assistant referees:
Amber McLachlan (Australia)
Doriane Domenjo (France)
Television match official:
Lee Jeffrey (New Zealand)

Notes:

- This was Canada's 150th test match.
- Taylor Perry was originally named at fly-half for Canada, but withdrew due to injury. Julia Schell was promoted from the bench while Anaïs Holly took Schell's place on the bench.

== United States vs Japan ==
15 October 2022
17:30 NZDT (UTC+13)

(1 BP) United States	30–17	Japan
Try: Kitlinski 45' m Kelter 55' m Cairns 62' c Detiveaux 70' c Con: Kelter (2/2) 63', 71'; Pen: Cantorna (1/1) 22'; Kelter (1/1) 80' +2	Report	Try: Abe 4' m Nagura 53' m Imakugi 77' c Con: Imakugi (1/1) 78'

Northland Events Centre, Whangārei
Referee: Amber McLachlan (Australia)

Team details

FB	15	Meya Bizer		(substituted off) 56'
RW	14	Jennine Detiveaux
OC	13	Eti Haungatau
IC	12	Alev Kelter
LW	11	Tess Feury
FH	10	Gabby Cantorna		(substituted off) 77'
SH	9	Olivia Ortiz		(substituted off) 56'
N8	8	Kate Zackary (c)
OF	7	Rachel Johnson
BF	6	Kathryn Johnson	(yellow card) 14'	(substituted off) 59'
RL	5	Evelyn Ashenbrucker		(substituted off) 77'
LL	4	Kristine Sommer
TP	3	Charli Jacoby		(substituted off) 56'
HK	2	Joanna Kitlinski		(substituted off) 77'
LP	1	Hope Rogers		(substituted off) 77'
Replacements:
HK	16	Kathryn Treder		(substituted in) 77'
PR	17	Catherine Benson		(substituted in) 77'
PR	18	Nick James		(substituted in) 56'
LK	19	Jenny Kronish		(substituted in) 77'
FL	20	Elizabeth Cairns		(substituted in) 59'
SH	21	Carly Waters		(substituted in) 56'
FH	22	Megan Foster		(substituted in) 77'
WG	23	Lotte Clapp		(substituted in) 56'
Coach:
(England) Rob Cain

FB	15	Rinka Matsuda		(substituted off) 71'
RW	14	Hinano Nagura
OC	13	Mana Furuta
IC	12	Minori Yamamoto
LW	11	Komachi Imakugi	(yellow card) 80+3'
FH	10	Ayasa Otsuka
SH	9	Megumi Abe		(substituted off) 63'
N8	8	Seina Saito
OF	7	Kyoko Hosokawa		(substituted off) 59'
BF	6	Iroha Nagata
RL	5	Maki Takano		(substituted off) 63'
LL	4	Yuna Sato		(substituted off) 63'
TP	3	Sachiko Kato		(substituted off) 72'
HK	2	Kotomi Taniguchi		(substituted off) 61'
LP	1	Saki Minami (c)		(substituted off) 63'
Replacements:
HK	16	Hinata Komaki		(substituted in) 72'
PR	17	Nijiho Nagata		(substituted in) 61'
PR	18	Wako Kitano		(substituted in) 63'
LK	19	Kie Tamai		(substituted in) 63'
FL	20	Otoka Yoshimura		(substituted in) 63'
SH	21	Moe Tsukui		(substituted in) 63'
CE	22	Ria Anoku		(substituted in) 71'
FL	23	Ayano Nagai		(substituted in) 59'
Coach:
(Canada) Lesley McKenzie

Player of the Match:
Kate Zackary (United States)

Assistant referees:
Maggie Cogger-Orr (New Zealand)
Beatrice Benvenuti (Italy)
Television match official:
Ian Tempest (England)

== Italy vs Canada ==
16 October 2022
12:45 NZDT (UTC+13)

Italy	12–22	Canada (1 BP)
Try: Ostuni Minuzzi 1' m Giordano 80' c Con: Sillari (1/2) 80+1'	Report	Try: Farries 18' c Kaljuvee 50' m Tuttosi (2) 36' m, 56' m Con: Miller (1/3) 19'

Waitakere Stadium, Auckland
Referee: Sara Cox (England)

Team details

FB	15	Vittoria Ostuni Minuzzi
RW	14	Aura Muzzo
OC	13	Michela Sillari
IC	12	Beatrice Rigoni
LW	11	Maria Magatti
FH	10	Veronica Madia
SH	9	Sofia Stefan	(substituted off) 62'
N8	8	Elisa Giordano (c)
OF	7	Giada Franco	(substituted off) 72'
BF	6	Beatrice Veronese	(substituted off) 47'
RL	5	Giordana Duca
LL	4	Valeria Fedrighi
TP	3	Sara Seye	(substituted off) 64'
HK	2	Melissa Bettoni
LP	1	Silvia Turani
Replacements:
HK	16	Vittoria Vecchini
PR	17	Gaia Maris	(substituted in) 64'
PR	18	Emanuela Stecca
LK	19	Isabella Locatelli	(substituted in) 72'
FL	20	Francesca Sgorbini	(substituted in) 47'
SH	21	Sara Barattin	(substituted in) 62'
CE	22	Alyssa D'Incà	(substituted in) 66'
FL	23	Francesca Granzotto
Coach:
(Italy) Andrea Di Giandomenico

FB	15	Elissa Alarie
RW	14	Maddy Grant
OC	13	Sara Kaljuvee
IC	12	Alex Tessier
LW	11	Paige Farries
FH	10	Julia Schell
SH	9	Brianna Miller		(substituted off) 64'
N8	8	Sophie de Goede (c)
OF	7	Sara Svoboda
BF	6	Fabiola Forteza
RL	5	Tyson Beukeboom		(substituted off) 52'
LL	4	Courtney Holtkamp		(substituted off) 64'
TP	3	DaLeaka Menin		(substituted off) 72'
HK	2	Emily Tuttosi		(substituted off) 68'
LP	1	Olivia DeMerchant		(substituted off) 54'
Replacements:
HK	16	Gillian Boag		(substituted in) 68'
PR	17	Brittany Kassil		(substituted in) 54'
PR	18	Alex Ellis		(substituted in) 72'
LK	19	McKinley Hunt		(substituted in) 53'
LK	20	Emma Taylor	(yellow card) 66'	(substituted in) 64'
FL	21	Karen Paquin		(substituted in) 40'
SH	22	Justine Pelletier		(substituted in) 64'
WG	23	Alysha Corrigan
Coach:
(France) Kévin Rouet

Assistant referees:
Aurélie Groizeleau (France)
Doriane Domenjo (France)
Television match official:
Lee Jeffrey (New Zealand)

Notes:

- Olivia DeMerchant (Canada) earned her 50th test cap.
- Sara Tounesi was originally named on Italy's bench at 19, but withdrew before kickoff due to injury. Francesca Granzotto came onto the bench at 23, pushing everyone between 19 and 23 down a number.

== Japan vs Italy ==
23 October 2022
12:45 NZDT (UTC+13)

Japan	8–21	Italy
Try: Hosokawa 30' m Pen: Otsuka (1/1) 49'	Report	Try: Magatti 9' m Bettoni 78' c Con: Sillari (1/1) 80'; Pen: Sillari (3/3) 37', 54', 67'

Waitakere Stadium, Auckland
Referee: Maggie Cogger-Orr (New Zealand)

Team details

FB	15	Rinka Matsuda
RW	14	Hinano Nagura
OC	13	Mana Furuta
IC	12	Minori Yamamoto		(substituted off) 56'
LW	11	Komachi Imakugi	(yellow card) 63'	(substituted off) 74'
FH	10	Ayasa Otsuka
SH	9	Megumi Abe		(substituted off) 43'
N8	8	Seina Saito
OF	7	Iroha Nagata
BF	6	Kyoko Hosokawa		(substituted off) 67'
RL	5	Maki Takano		(substituted off) 58'
LL	4	Yuna Sato		(substituted off) 53'
TP	3	Sachiko Kato		(substituted off) 54'
HK	2	Kotomi Taniguchi
LP	1	Saki Minami (c)		(substituted off) 61'
Replacements:
HK	16	Hinata Komaki
PR	17	Makoto Lavemai		(substituted in) 61'
PR	18	Otoka Yoshimura		(substituted in) 54'
LK	19	Masami Kawamura		(substituted in) 53'
FL	20	Sakurako Korai		(substituted in) 67'
SH	21	Moe Tsukui		(substituted in) 43'
CE	22	Shione Nakayama		(substituted in) 56'
FL	23	Ria Anoku		(substituted in) 74'
Coach:
(Canada) Lesley McKenzie

FB	15	Vittoria Ostuni Minuzzi
RW	14	Aura Muzzo
OC	13	Michela Sillari
IC	12	Beatrice Rigoni
LW	11	Maria Magatti
FH	10	Veronica Madia
SH	9	Sara Barattin	(substituted off) 73'
N8	8	Elisa Giordano (c)
OF	7	Giada Franco
BF	6	Francesca Sgorbini
RL	5	Giordana Duca
LL	4	Sara Tounesi	(substituted off) 73'
TP	3	Sara Seye
HK	2	Melissa Bettoni
LP	1	Silvia Turani
Replacements:
HK	16	Vittoria Vecchini
PR	17	Gaia Maris
PR	18	Emanuela Stecca
LK	19	Valeria Fedrighi	(substituted in) 73'
FL	20	Isabella Locatelli
FL	21	Beatrice Veronese	(substituted in) 73'
SH	22	Sofia Stefan	(substituted in) 73'
WG	23	Alyssa D'Incà
Coach:
(Italy) Andrea Di Giandomenico

Assistant referees:
Hollie Davidson (Scotland)
Tyler Miller (Australia)
Television match official:
Ben Whitehouse (Wales)

== Canada vs United States ==
23 October 2022
15:15 NZDT (UTC+13)

(1 BP) Canada	29–14	United States
Try: Tuttosi 6' m Tessier 15' c Farries 37' c DeMerchant 60' m Nelson 80+1' m Con: de Goede (2/4) 16', 39'	Report	Try: Kelter 19' c Zackary 71' c Con: Kelter (2/2) 21', 72'

Waitakere Stadium, Auckland
Referee: Aimee Barrett-Theron (South Africa)

Team details

FB	15	Elissa Alarie
RW	14	Maddy Grant
OC	13	Alysha Corrigan
IC	12	Sara Kaljuvee			(substituted off) 73'
LW	11	Paige Farries	57' to 68'
FH	10	Alex Tessier	(substituted off) 78'
SH	9	Justine Pelletier
N8	8	Sophie de Goede (c)	(substituted off) 62'
OF	7	Sara Svoboda
BF	6	Karen Paquin
RL	5	McKinley Hunt	(substituted off) 62'
LL	4	Courtney Holtkamp	(substituted off) 40'
TP	3	DaLeaka Menin	(substituted off) 51'
HK	2	Emily Tuttosi	(substituted off) 62'
LP	1	Brittany Kassil	(substituted off) 55'
Replacements:
HK	16	Gillian Boag	(substituted in) 62'
PR	17	Mikiela Nelson	(substituted in) 55'
PR	18	Olivia DeMerchant	(substituted in) 51'
LK	19	Ngalula Fuamba	(substituted in) 40'
LK	20	Tyson Beukeboom	(substituted in) 62'
FL	21	Gabby Senft	(substituted in) 62'
SH	22	Anaïs Holly	(substituted in) 57'	(substituted off) 68'	(substituted in) 73'
FH	23	Julia Schell	(substituted in) 78'
Coach:
(France) Kévin Rouet

FB	15	Tess Feury
RW	14	Jennine Detiveaux
OC	13	Eti Haungatau	(substituted off) 68'
IC	12	Alev Kelter
LW	11	Lotte Clapp
FH	10	Gabby Cantorna	(substituted off) 70'
SH	9	Carly Waters	(substituted off) 60'
N8	8	Kate Zackary (c)
OF	7	Rachel Johnson
BF	6	Kathryn Johnson	(substituted off) 68'
RL	5	Evelyn Ashenbrucker	(substituted off) 68'
LL	4	Kristine Sommer
TP	3	Nick James	(substituted off) 55'
HK	2	Joanna Kitlinski	(substituted off) 68'
LP	1	Hope Rogers	(substituted off) 68'
Replacements:
HK	16	Kathryn Treder	(substituted in) 68'
PR	17	Catherine Benson	(substituted in) 68'
PR	18	Charli Jacoby	(substituted in) 55'
LK	19	Jenny Kronish	(substituted in) 68'
FL	20	Elizabeth Cairns	(substituted in) 68'
SH	21	Bridget Kahele	(substituted in) 60'
CE	22	Katana Howard	(substituted in) 70'
FB	23	Meya Bizer	(substituted in) 68'
Coach:
(England) Rob Cain

Player of the Match:
Alysha Corrigan (Canada)

Assistant referees:
Joy Neville (Ireland)
Doriane Domenjo (France)
Television match official:
Ian Tempest (England)
