= Marie Thibault =

Canadian rugby player (born 1998)

- Born: 7 January 1998 (age 28)
- Height: 1.66 m (5 ft 5 in)

Rugby union career
- Position: Outside Centre
Senior career
Years	Team	Apps	(Points)
2020–	Stade Bordelais		(0)
International career
Years	Team	Apps	(Points)
2018–Present	Canada		(0)

Marie Thibault (born 7 January 1998) is a Canadian rugby union player.

Thibault plays for Club de rugby de Québec. She made her international debut for Canada against England on 18 November 2018 at Doncaster. In 2020, She signed for French club Stade Bordelais. Thibault has returned to Canada to play club rugby for Club de Rugby de Quebec.

Thibault was named in Canada's squad for the delayed 2021 Rugby World Cup in New Zealand.
