= Makoto Lavemai =

Japanese rugby union player (born 1997)

- Born: 2 July 1997 (age 29) Fukuoka, Japan
- Height: 1.63 m (5 ft 4 in)
- Weight: 73 kg (161 lb)
- School: Fukuoka High School

Rugby union career
- Position: Prop
International career
Years	Team	Apps	(Points)
2017–	Japan	20	(0)

Makoto Lavemai (ラベマイまこと, born Makoto Ebuchi, July 2, 1997) is a Japanese women's rugby union player. She plays as a tighthead prop. She played for Yokogawa Musashino Artemi Stars. She competed for Japan at the 2017 and 2021 Women's Rugby World Cups.

== Early life ==
Lavemai was born in Fukuoka, Japan on 2 July 1997. She graduated from Fukuoka High School in 2016, and entered Aoyama Gakuin University, where she was he first female member of the otherwise all male rugby club. She graduated from Aoyama Gakuin University in 2020, and went to work at Toppan Printing.

== Rugby career ==
Lavemai competed for Japan at the 2017 Women's Rugby World Cup in Ireland. In 2021, She played in Japan's autumn test match against Ireland in November. They were narrowly defeated 15–12.

Lavemai joined the Brumbies for the 2022 Super W season, along with Sakura Fifteens teammate, Mana Furuta. She played against Ireland again in August 2022. Despite a four-point margin at half-time; Ireland managed to make a comeback to outscore Japan by 50 points.

In September 2022, Lavemai started in Japan's historic match against the Black Ferns ahead of the World Cup. Japan were trounced 95–12 with the Black Ferns scoring 15 tries. She also competed at the delayed 2021 Rugby World Cup in New Zealand. She featured in the matches against Canada and Italy in the pool stage.

== Family ==
Lavemai's husband is the Tongan rugby player, Sione Lavemai.
