= Fukuoka Prefectural Fukuoka High School =

Coordinates: 33°35′58″N 130°25′06″E

- 福岡県立福岡高等学校
- Fukuoka City, Fukuoka Prefecture; Japan

Information
- Type: Public secondary
- Opened: 1917
- Grades: 10–12
- Gender: Co-educational
- Classes: 30
- Campus type: urban
- Website: http://fukuoka.fku.ed.jp/ (in Japanese)

Fukuoka Prefectural Fukuoka High School (福岡県立福岡高等学校, Fukuoka Kenritsu Fukuoka Kōtōgakkō) is a co-educational public senior high school located in Hakata ward, Fukuoka city, Fukuoka prefecture, Japan. It is often called "Fukkō" (福高) for short. Note, however, that there are several high schools with similar names in Saitama Prefecture in Eastern Japan and Iwate Prefecture in Northern Japan, Toyama Prefecture in central Japan.

== Outline ==
The majority of Fukuoka High School students attend four-year universities after graduating from FHS. This school has one of the top reputations among public high schools in Fukuoka Prefecture (along with Shuyukan Senior High School and Chikushigaoka High School) because a large number of graduates continue on to Kyushu University, one of the top public universities in Japan.

== History ==
Fukuoka High School was founded in 1917 under the former Japanese educational system in which children went directly to high school after graduating from elementary school. It was not until 1924 that separate facilities were constructed—until then, students shared use of the buildings at Shuyukan high school for classes. The original buildings were made of wood, and they burned down in 1927. Following the fire, the school was reconstructed in stone and cement; those buildings have remained in use until today.

== Notable alumni ==
- Tetsu Nakamura
