= Megan Webb =

Wales international rugby union player

- Born: 9 January 2001 (age 25) Bridgend, South Wales
- Height: 1.7 m (5.6 ft)
- Weight: 71.82 kg (11.310 st)
- University: University of South Wales

Rugby union career
- Position: Centre
Senior career
Years	Team	Apps	(Points)
2017-2019	Cardiff Blues		
International career
Years	Team	Apps	(Points)
2019–present	Wales	8	
- Correct as of 27 May 2021

Megan Webb (born 9 January 2001) is a Welsh Rugby Union player who plays centre for the Wales women's national rugby union team. She made her debut for the Wales national team in 2019 and was part of the squad for the 2021 Women's Six Nations Championship.

== Club career ==
Webb began playing rugby as a child, first for Bridgend Athletic and then on turning 14 for Cardiff Harlequins under-18s. She represented Wales at under-18 level, and has played regional rugby for Cardiff Blues.

== International career ==
Webb made her Wales senior debut in November 2019 against Spain, and appeared in further matches against Ireland and Scotland during the 2019 Autumn Internationals, as well as the double header Barbarians fixtures at the Principality Stadium.

She made her Women's Six Nations debut against France in February 2020.

Webb has won eight caps in her rugby career to date. She was selected in Wales squad for the 2021 Rugby World Cup in New Zealand.

== Personal life ==
Webb attended Bryntirion Comprehensive before joining the University of South Wales to study nursing. During the COVID-19 pandemic, she worked as a healthcare assistant on the NHS frontline.

Rugby is prevalent within her family. Her first cousins include Leicester Tigers back-row Tommy Reffell, and Wales and Ospreys scrum-half Rhys Webb.
