= Yuka Sadaka =

- Born: 2 November 1994 (age 32)
- Height: 167 cm (5 ft 6 in)
- Weight: 88 kg (194 lb; 13 st 12 lb)

Rugby union career
- Position: Prop
Senior career
Years	Team	Apps	(Points)
- Hirosaki Sakura Ovals
International career
Years	Team	Apps	(Points)
2014–	Japan	20	(5)

Yuka Sadaka (born 2 November 1994) is a Japanese rugby union player. She competed for Japan at the 2021 Rugby World Cup.

== Rugby career ==
Sadaka started playing rugby in her first year of junior high school.

She earned her first cap for Japan in May 2014 in the Asian Championship match against Hong Kong.

In 2022, she scored one of two tries in the Sakura's historic match against the Black Ferns before the World Cup. She was selected in Japan's squad for the delayed 2021 Rugby World Cup in New Zealand.

She featured for Japan at the inaugural WXV 2 tournament in 2023.
