= Minori Yamamoto (rugby union) =

Japan international rugby union player

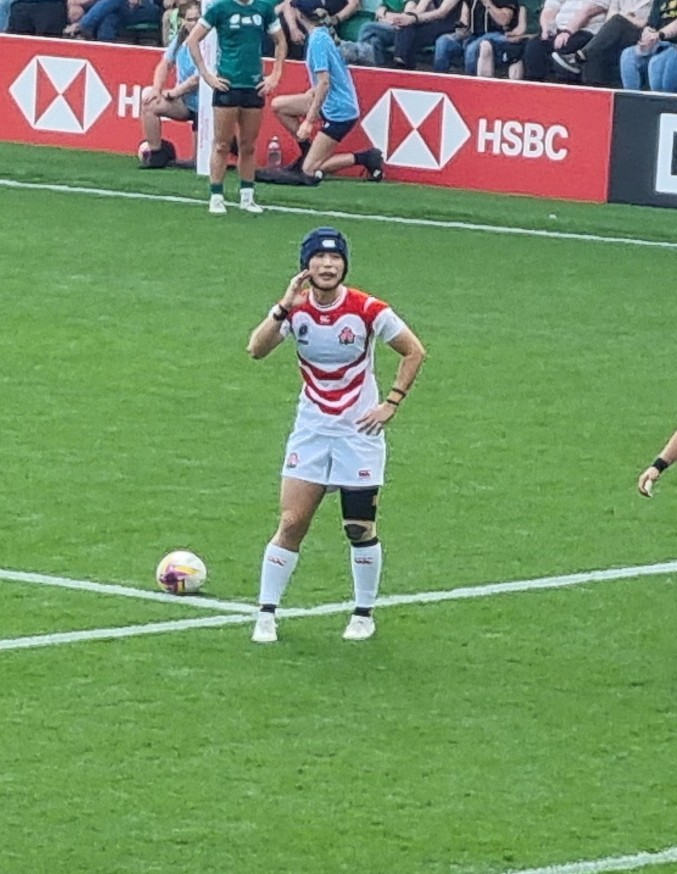
- Born: 9 December 1996 (age 29) Yokohama, Japan
- Height: 169 cm (5 ft 7 in)
- Weight: 72 kg (159 lb; 11 st 5 lb)
- School: Tokai University Sagami High School
- University: Nippon Sport Science University

Rugby union career
- Position: Fly-half
- Current team: Yokohama TKM
Senior career
Years	Team	Apps	(Points)
2019–2021	Mie Pearls		(0)
2021–2023	Worcester Warriors	29	(47)
2023–2024	Sale Sharks Women	9	(5)
2024–	Yokohama TKM		(0)
International career
Years	Team	Apps	(Points)
2017–	Japan	41	(35)

Minori Yamamoto (山本実 born 9 December 1996) is a Japanese rugby union and sevens player. She plays fly-half for Japan internationally and for Sale Sharks in Premiership Women's Ruby. She competed at the 2017, 2021 and 2025 Women's Rugby World Cups.

== Early life ==
Yamamoto was born in Aoba Ward, Yokohama City in the Kanagawa Prefecture.

== Rugby career ==
Yamamoto competed for Japan at the 2017 Rugby World Cup and started in every match. She played for Mie Pearls. She later played for Worcester Warriors in 2021.

Yamamoto kicked a conversion and a penalty to help her side beat South Africa in their warm-up match ahead of the 2021 World Cup. She competed for Japan at the delayed 2021 Rugby World Cup that was held in New Zealand.

On 8 December 2023, Sale Sharks announced that Yamamoto had signed for the club following the withdrawal of Worcester Warriors from the league. She received her first start for the Sharks in their game against the Saracens in 2024. She departed Sale at the end of the 2023–24 season. On 1 August 2024 she joined her hometown team Yokohama TKM.

She was named in the Sakura fifteens squad for their tour to the United States. She eventually featured in her sides 39–33 victory over the Eagles in Los Angeles on 26 April 2025. On 28 July 2025, she was named in the Japanese side to the Women's Rugby World Cup in England.
