= Michela Sillari =

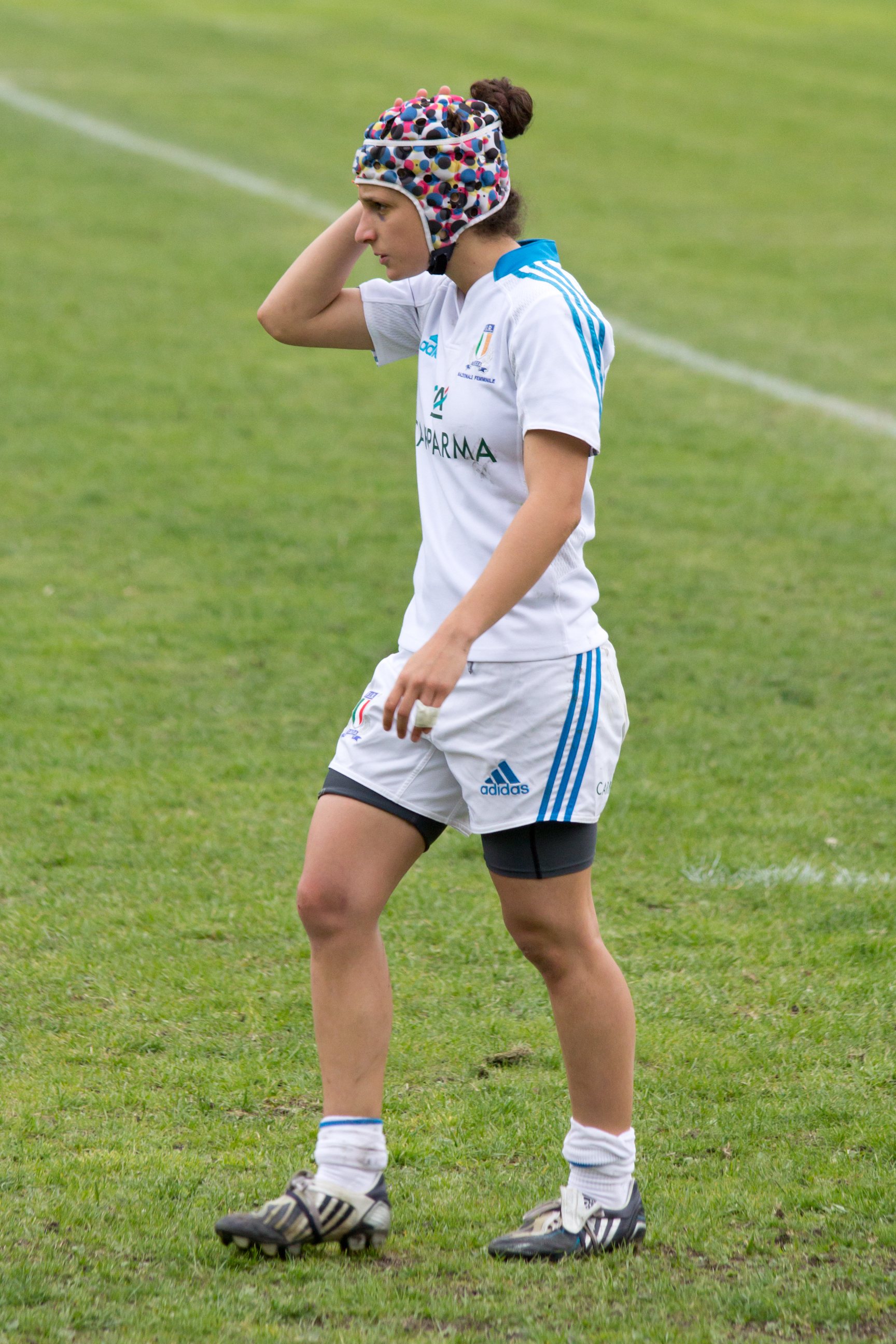
- Sillari in 2013
- Born: 23 February 1993 (age 33) Parma, Italy
- Height: 165 cm (5 ft 5 in)
- Weight: 60 kg (132 lb; 9 st 6 lb)
- Occupation: civil engineer

Rugby union career
- Position: Centre
Senior career
Years	Team	Apps	(Points)
2011–16	Rugby Colorno		(0)
2016–17	Aylesford Bulls		(0)
2017–19	Rugby Colorno		(0)
2019–	Valsugana		(0)
International career
Years	Team	Apps	(Points)
2012–	Italy	94	(309)
- Correct as of 2025-09-24

Michela Sillari (born 23 February 1993) is an Italian rugby union player. She plays Centre for Italy internationally and for Valsugana Rugby Padova at club level. She has competed in two Rugby World Cup's, in 2017 and in the delayed 2021 tournament.

As of April 2025, Sillari is the best international scorer for Italy still in activity, and the second best overall after the retired Veronica Schiavon.

== Rugby career ==
Sillari started playing rugby at the age of seven, she first played for Amatori Parma's youth team and then moved on to play for the Rugby Noceto Football Club, and then for Lupe Piacenza. She played for Rugby Colorno from 2011 to 2016.

Sillari made her test debut for Italy against England on 12 February in Recco in the 2012 Women's Six Nations Championship.

In 2016 she joined Aylesford Bulls, who later merged with Harlequins in 2017, and went on to win the 2016–17 Women's Premiership season. She then returned to Rugby Colorno in 2017, and made the Italian squad for the 2017 Women's Rugby World Cup in Ireland.

On 23 April 2022, Sillari was named Player of the Match in Italy's Six Nations win over Scotland, she scored ten of her side's 20 points. On 9 September, leading up to the Rugby World Cup, Sillari scored a try in her side's 26–19 victory over France in a warm-up match. She was selected in Italy's squad for the delayed 2021 Rugby World Cup in New Zealand.

She was named in the Italian side for the 2025 Women's Six Nations Championship. On 11 August, she was named in the Italian squad to the Women's Rugby World Cup in England.
