= Ai Hirayama =

Japan international rugby union player

- Born: 7 May 1992 (age 34)
- Height: 156 cm (5 ft 1 in)
- Weight: 60 kg (132 lb; 9 st 6 lb)

Rugby union career
- Position: Fullback
International career
Years	Team	Apps	(Points)
2019–	Japan	5	(0)

Ai Hirayama (born 7 May 1992) is a Japanese rugby union player. She competed for Japan at the 2021 Rugby World Cup.

== Early life and career ==
Hirayama played basketball at Kiryu Commercial High School, after graduating from high school in 2011 she joined the Japan Self-Defense Force at the age of 20. She only started playing rugby at the age of 21.

== Rugby career ==
On 16 November 2019, Hirayama earned her first cap for Japan as a starter against Italy during her sides European tour.

In 2022, she was selected for Japan's squad to the delayed 2021 Rugby World Cup in New Zealand.
