= Rumandi Potgieter =

South African rugby union player

- Born: 5 October 1997 (age 29)
- Height: 169 cm (5 ft 7 in)
- Weight: 72 kg (159 lb)

Rugby union career
- Position: scrum-half
- Current team: Golden Lions
Senior career
Years	Team	Apps	(Points)
2022	Blue Bulls		
2023–2025	Bulls Daisies		
2026–	Golden Lions		
International career
Years	Team	Apps	(Points)
2022–	South Africa	17	(0)
- Correct as of 22 March 2025

Rumandi Potgieter (born 5 October 1997) is a South African international rugby union player, playing in the position of scrum-half.

== Biography ==
Rumandi Potgieter was born on the 5 October 1997. In 2022 she played for the Bulls Daisies club in Pretoria. Taiyo-seimei Japan Rugby Challenge Series 2022 debut.

She had only three caps for the national team when she was selected in September 2022 to represent her country at the Rugby World Cup in New Zealand.

Potgieter signed for the Golden Lions Women in February 2026.
