= Unam Tose =

South African rugby union and sevens player

- Born: 3 May 2000 (age 26)
- Height: 151 cm (4 ft 11 in)
- Weight: 60 kg (132 lb)

Rugby union career
- Position: Scrum-half
Senior career
Years	Team	Apps	(Points)
- Border Bulldogs
2023–	Bulls Daisies		
International career
Years	Team	Apps	(Points)
2019–	South Africa	29	(15)
- Correct as of 22 September 2025

Unam Tose (born 3 May 2000), is a South African international rugby union player playing as a scrum-half.

== Biographie ==
Unam Tose was born on 3 May 2000.

In 2022, she plays for the Border Bulldogs. She had 11 caps for South Africa when she was selected in September 2022 to play in the World Cup in New Zealand.

She was named in the Springbok Women's squad to the 2025 Women's Rugby World Cup that will be held in England.
