= Nicole James =

American rugby union player

- Born: January 20, 1989 (age 37)
- Height: 1.72 m (5 ft 7 1/2 in)
- Weight: 103 kg (227 lb; 16 st 3 lb)

Rugby union career
- Position: Prop
Senior career
Years	Team	Apps	(Points)
- Sale Sharks
International career
Years	Team	Apps	(Points)
2017	United States	16	(-)

Nicole James (born January 20, 1989) is an American rugby union player. She debuted for the United States at the 2017 Women's Rugby World Cup in Ireland. She was uncapped when she was selected for the World Cup.

James attended Texas A&M University. She plays for the Houston Athletic Rugby Club, is a player-coach for SHARCs and coaches the Woodlands Youth Rugby Club Girls and the Texas A&M Women’s Rugby Team.

James was named in the Eagles squad for the 2022 Pacific Four Series in New Zealand. She was selected in the Eagles squad for the 2021 Rugby World Cup in New Zealand.
