= Yuki Ito (rugby union) =

Japan international rugby union player

- Born: 24 October 1996 (age 30)
- Height: 163 cm (5 ft 4 in)
- Weight: 63 kg (139 lb; 9 st 13 lb)

Rugby union career
- Position: Wing
Senior career
Years	Team	Apps	(Points)
- Mie Pearls
International career
Years	Team	Apps	(Points)
2015–	Japan	12	(0)

Yuki Ito (born 24 October 1996) is a Japanese rugby union and sevens player. She competed for Japan at the 2021 Rugby World Cup.

== Early life and career ==
Ito began practicing judo at the age of four, and also took part in classical ballet and gymnastics. She participated in judo until junior high school. After graduating from Chikushi High School in 2015, she entered Nippon Sport Science University.

In 2015, she represented Japan's under-20 women's sevens team at the Asia Rugby U20 Sevens Series tournament in Johor Bahru, Malaysia.

== Rugby career ==
She competed for Japan in the 2017 Rugby World Cup qualification rounds for Asia and Oceania in 2016.

Ito joined Mie Pearls after graduating from Nippon Sport Science University in 2019.

In 2022, she was selected for the Japanese squad to the delayed 2021 Rugby World Cup in New Zealand.

== Personal life ==
Her younger brother, Daisuke, is also a rugby player. She joined the Administration Division at Sumitomo Wiring Systems in 2019.
