= Simamkele Namba =

South African rugby union and sevens player

- Born: 3 October 1998 (age 28)
- Height: 1.52 m (5 ft 0 in)
- Weight: 72 kg (159 lb)

Rugby union career
- Position: Outside Back
Senior career
Years	Team	Apps	(Points)
	Western Province		(0)
International career
Years	Team	Apps	(Points)
	South Africa	12	(45)
National sevens team
Years	Team		Comps
2022	South Africa		4

Simamkele Namba (born 3 October 1998) is a South African rugby union and sevens player. She has represented South Africa internationally in rugby sevens and fifteens.

== Rugby career ==
Namba represented South Africa at the 2022 Rugby World Cup Sevens in Cape Town. She was selected in South Africa's women's fifteens team for the Rugby World Cup in New Zealand.
