= Shione Nakayama =

Japan international rugby union player

- Born: 18 January 1999 (age 27)
- Height: 170 cm (5 ft 7 in)
- Weight: 71 kg (157 lb; 11 st 3 lb)

Rugby union career
- Position(s): Wing, Center
Senior career
Years	Team	Apps	(Points)
- Yokogawa Musashino Artemi-Stars
International career
Years	Team	Apps	(Points)
2016–	Japan	9	(0)

Shione Nakayama (born 18 January 1999) is a Japanese rugby union player. She competed for Japan at the 2021 Rugby World Cup.

== Career ==
Nakayama graduated from Miyazaki Kita High School in 2013 and then enrolled at Nippon Sport Science University.

On 8 May 2016, she made her Test debut for Japan against Hong Kong in the Asia Rugby Women's Championship.

Nakayama graduated from Nippon Sport Science University in 2017 and joined Yokogawa Musashino Artemi-Stars.

In 2022, she was selected in Japan's squad to the delayed Rugby World Cup in New Zealand.
