= Ria Anoku =

- Born: 2 October 1996 (age 30)
- Height: 160 cm (5 ft 3 in)
- Weight: 60 kg (132 lb; 9 st 6 lb)

Rugby union career
- Position: Fullback
Senior career
Years	Team	Apps	(Points)
- Mie Pearls
International career
Years	Team	Apps	(Points)
2019–	Japan	9	(0)
2025–	Japan		

Ria Anoku (born 2 October 1996) is a Japanese rugby union player. She competed for Japan at the 2021 Rugby World Cup.

== Early life ==
After graduating from Kobe Kohoku High School in 2015, she enrolled at Nippon Sport Science University.

== Rugby career ==
=== XVs ===
Anoku plays for Mie Pearls. On 13 July 2019, she started in her international debut for Japan against Australia during her team's tour of Australia.

In 2021, she appeared for the Sakura fifteens side in their 15–12 loss to Ireland in Dublin.

In 2022, she was selected in the Japanese squad for the delayed 2021 Rugby World Cup in New Zealand. She featured for Japan in their pool game against the United States.

=== Sevens ===
Anoku made her international debut for the Japanese women's national sevens team during the Perth leg of the 2024–25 SVNS.

== Personal life ==
Anoku's older brother, Shota, previously played club rugby for Urayasu D-Rocks. She graduated from Nippon Sport Science University in 2019, and joined Sumitomo Wiring Systems.
