= Saki Minami =

Japanese rugby union player

- Born: 18 November 1995 (age 30)
- Height: 1.63 m (5 ft 4 in)
- Weight: 67 kg (148 lb)

Rugby union career
- Position: Loose Forward
Senior career
| Years | Team | Apps | (Points) |
| 2018–2023 | Yokogawa Musashino Artemi-Stars | 0 | (0) |
International career
| Years | Team | Apps | (Points) |
| 2015– | Japan | 26 | (0) |

Saki Minami (born 18 November 1995) is a Japanese rugby union player. She plays Prop for Japan internationally. She competed at the 2017 and 2021 Rugby World Cups.

== Rugby career ==
In 2016, she scored a try in Japan's win against Hong Kong in the Asia Rugby Women's Championship.

Minami competed at the 2017 Rugby World Cup in Ireland. She captained the Sakura XVs side in their test against the Wallaroos in July 2019. At the end of 2019 she was named as a reserve for the Barbarians women's side that played Wales.

In 2022, Minami played for the Yokogawa Musashino Artemi-Stars club in Tokyo. She was captain of the Japan side that successfully ended their Australian tour unbeaten in 2022.

She captained the Sakura's side in her 26th test on 24 September 2022, it was a historic occasion as it was the first-ever match between Japan and the Black Ferns. She also led the Sakura's at the delayed 2021 Rugby World Cup in New Zealand.
