= Kie Tamai =

- Born: 24 October 1992 (age 34)
- Height: 168 cm (5 ft 6 in)
- Weight: 76 kg (168 lb; 12 st 0 lb)

Rugby union career
- Position: Prop
Senior career
Years	Team	Apps	(Points)
2016–2023	Mie Pearls		
2023–2025	Trailfinders		
International career
Years	Team	Apps	(Points)
2019–2023	Japan	16	(0)

Kie Tamai (born 24 October 1992) is a former Japanese rugby union player. She competed for Japan at the 2021 Rugby World Cup.

== Early life and career ==
Tamai initially played basketball from elementary to high school. In her senior year of high school, she was invited by the rugby coach to try out the sport, and has been playing rugby ever since.

She graduated from Matsusaka High School in 2010 and then entered Kwansei Gakuin University. She joined the university's rugby club with over 100 male members as the only female player.

After graduating from Kwansei Gakuin University, she worked as an English teacher at a junior high school. After working for a private company, she joined Pasona in 2019.

== Rugby career ==
Tamai joined the newly formed, Mie Pearls, in 2016 while also working as an English teacher at a junior high school.

On 13 July 2019, she earned her first cap for Japan as a starter against Australia during her sides tour of Australia.

In July 2022, she captained Japan in a test match against South Africa. She was subsequently selected in Japan's squad for the delayed 2021 Rugby World Cup in New Zealand.

Tamai joined Ealing Trailfinders in the Premiership Women's Rugby competition in 2023.
