= Brianna Miller =

Canadian rugby union player

- Born: 18 September 1991 (age 35)
- Height: 1.66 m (5 ft 5 in)
- Weight: 58 kg (128 lb)

Rugby union career
- Position(s): Scrumhalf, Fullback
International career
Years	Team	Apps	(Points)
2016–Present	Canada	34	(14)

Brianna Miller (born 18 September 1991) is a Canadian rugby union player.

Miller competed for Canada at the delayed 2021 Rugby World Cup in New Zealand. She was later ruled out for the remainder of the World Cup after she sustained significant internal injuries in the match against Italy; she had scored two tries in Canada's opening match against Japan.
