= Rinka Matsuda =

Japanese rugby union and sevens player

- Born: 5 December 2001 (age 24) Tokyo, Japan
- Height: 170 cm (5 ft 7 in)
- Weight: 73 kg (161 lb; 11 st 7 lb)

Rugby union career
- Position: Fullback
Senior career
Years	Team	Apps	(Points)
2024–	Tokyo Sankyu Phoenix		(0)
International career
Years	Team	Apps	(Points)
2022–	Japan	14	(20)
National sevens team
Years	Team		Comps
2019–Present	Japan		

Rinka Matsuda (born 5 December 2001) is a Japanese rugby union and sevens player. She competed for Japan at the 2021 and 2025 Women's Rugby World Cups. She represented the Japanese women's sevens team at the 2024 Summer Olympics.

== Rugby career ==
=== Sevens ===
In 2019, Matsuda was just a 17 year old third-year high school student when she made her international sevens debut. It was at the Japan leg of the 2018–19 Women's Sevens Series in Kitakyushu, she started in all three of Japan's matches.

She was initially expected to make her Olympic debut in her home city for the 2020 Olympics, but was replaced a week before the Games due to injury.

In 2023, She was a member of the side that won a silver medal at the delayed 2022 Asian Games in Hangzhou, China. She competed for Japan at the 2024 Summer Olympics in Paris.

=== XVs ===
In 2022, She scored a try in Japan's historic 29–10 win over Ireland ahead of the World Cup. She competed for Japan at the delayed 2021 Rugby World Cup in New Zealand.

She was selected in the Sakura fifteens squad for their tour to the United States in April 2025. On 28 July 2025, she was named in the Japanese side to the Women's Rugby World Cup in England.

== Personal life ==
Her father is former Japanese international, Tsutomu Matsuda, who represented Japan in fifteens and sevens.
