= Maki Takano =

Japan international rugby union player

- Born: 17 August 1995 (age 31)
- Height: 169 cm (5 ft 7 in)
- Weight: 69 kg (152 lb; 10 st 12 lb)

Rugby union career
- Position(s): Lock, Loose Forward
Senior career
Years	Team	Apps	(Points)
- Tokyo Sankyu Phoenix
- Yokogawa Musashino Artemi-Stars
Provincial / State sides
Years	Team	Apps	(Points)
2019	Wellington	4	(0)
International career
Years	Team	Apps	(Points)
2015–	Japan	20	
National sevens team
Years	Team		Comps
	Japan 7s		4

Maki Takano (born 17 August 1995) is a Japanese rugby union player. She competed for Japan at the 2017 and 2021 Rugby World Cups.

== Early life and career ==
Takano attended the Rural Rugby School. After graduating from Kosei Gakuen Girls' High School in 2014, she entered Nippon Sport Science University. Her older brother, Yuhei, is also a rugby player.

== Rugby career ==
Takano participated in the 2015 Asia Rugby Championship where Japan clinched their first championship title, she scored Japan's first try in their victory against Hong Kong.

In 2017, she was selected for the Japan women's national rugby union team for the Rugby World Cup in Ireland. She has also competed for the Japan's women's national sevens team.

After graduating from Nippon Sport Science University in 2018, she joined Yokogawa Musashino Artemi-Stars.

In 2022, she was selected for Japan's squad to the delayed 2021 Rugby World Cup in New Zealand. She scored Japan's only try against Canada in their opening match of the World Cup.
