= Maddy Grant =

Canadian rugby union player

- Born: 12 March 2001 (age 25)
- Height: 1.80 m (5 ft 11 in)
- Weight: 85 kg (187 lb)

Rugby union career
- Position: Back Row
- Current team: Harlequins
Senior career
Years	Team	Apps	(Points)
2024-	Harlequins	5	(5)
- Correct as of 24 January 2026
International career
Years	Team	Apps	(Points)
2022–	Canada	22	
- Correct as of 24 January 2025

Madison Kate Grant (born 12 March 2001) is a Canadian rugby union player. She competed for Canada at the delayed 2021 Rugby World Cup in New Zealand. She featured in the semifinal against England, and in the third place final against France.

In December 2024 she joined Harlequins as a medical joker to replace fellow Canadian Sara Svoboda.
