= Seina Saito =

Japanese rugby union player (born 1992)

- Born: 30 May 1992 (age 34)
- Height: 1.64 m (5 ft 5 in)
- Weight: 73 kg (161 lb)

Rugby union career
- Position: Flanker
Senior career
Years	Team	Apps	(Points)
	Mie Pearls		(0)
Super Rugby
Years	Team	Apps	(Points)
2024	Chiefs Manawa	5	(10)
International career
Years	Team	Apps	(Points)
2012–	Japan	53	(105)

Seina Saito (born 30 May 1992) is a Japanese rugby union and rugby sevens player. She plays flanker for the Japan women's national rugby union team. She competed at the 2017, 2021 and the 2025 Women's Rugby World Cups.

== Early life ==
Saito was born in Tondabayashi City, Osaka on 30 May 1992.

She attended Shitennoji Habikigaoka High School, and then the Osaka University of Physical Education.

In 2015, she had a short stint in Christchurch as part of an International Rugby Programme where she played for Canterbury University.

== Domestic career ==
Saito played for the Mie Pearls. On 28 November 2023, it was revealed that she had signed with the Chiefs Manawa for the 2024 Super Rugby Aupiki season.

== International career ==
She competed at the 2016 Asia Rugby Women's Championship. She later captained the Japanese squad to the 2017 Rugby World Cup in Ireland.

In 2019, Saito was one of the first two Japanese players invited to join the Woman's Barbarians team for their tour of Europe, playing in the team that beat the Woman's Wales team.

Saito scored a try for Japan in their historic clash against the Black Ferns at Eden Park ahead of the World Cup in 2022. She competed at the delayed 2021 Rugby World Cup that was held in New Zealand.

On 28 July 2025, she was named in the Japanese side to the Women's Rugby World Cup in England.
