= Eti Haungatau =

- Born: 25 September 2000 (age 26) Sacramento, California
- Height: 5 ft 7 in (170 cm)
- Weight: 256 lb (116 kg)

Rugby union career
- Position(s): Center (XV), Center (7s)
International career
Years	Team	Apps	(Points)
2019–Present	United States	9	(5)
National sevens team
Years	Team		Comps
2019–Present	United States		5 (0)

Eti Haungatau (born 25 September 2000) is an American rugby union player, currently playing for Sale Sharks in the Allianz Premier 15s.

== Personal life ==
Haungatau has been playing rugby since she was nine years old. She is the niece of 2016 Olympian, Joanne Fa'avesi, and is a cousin of another 2016 Olympian, Folau Niua.

== Rugby career ==
In 2019, Haungatau scored two tries for the Eagles against a Barbarians side in April. She made her international debut for the Eagles fifteens against England at the Super Series in June. She later debuted for the Eagles sevens at the USA Women's Sevens in October.

Haungatau was selected in the United States squad for the 2021 Rugby World Cup in New Zealand. In 2023, She was named in the Eagles traveling squad for their test against Spain, and for the 2023 Pacific Four Series. She scored a try in her sides hard-fought victory over Spain, they won 20–14.
