= Hinano Nagura =

Japan international rugby union player

- Born: 22 March 1997 (age 29)
- Height: 170 cm (5 ft 7 in)
- Weight: 71 kg (157 lb; 11 st 3 lb)

Rugby union career
- Position(s): Wing, Center
Senior career
Years	Team	Apps	(Points)
- Yokogawa Musashino Artemi-Stars
International career
Years	Team	Apps	(Points)
2019–	Japan	14	(5)

Hinano Nagura (born 22 March 1997) is a Japanese rugby union player. She competed for Japan at the 2021 Rugby World Cup.

== Early life ==
Nagura graduated from Kobe Kohoku High School in 2015. She attended Nippon Sport Science University where she graduated in 2019.

== Rugby career ==
In 2018, Nagura led a Japanese women's development sevens side at the Fiji Coral Coast Sevens in Sigatoka.

She joined the Yokogawa Musashino Artemi-Stars after graduating from Nippon Sport Science University.

On 13 July 2019, she started in her international debut for Japan against Australia during her side's tour of Australia.

In 2022, Nagura featured in the Sakura's 29–10 victory over Ireland in the final match of a two-test series at Chichibunomiya Stadium in Tokyo. She was selected for the Japanese squad to the delayed Rugby World Cup in New Zealand. She scored a try in Japan's 30–17 loss to the United States in their pool game.
