= Kyoko Hosokawa =

Japan international rugby union player

- Born: 8 July 1999 (age 27)
- Height: 164 cm (5 ft 5 in)
- Weight: 71 kg (157 lb; 11 st 3 lb)

Rugby union career
- Position: Loose Forward
Senior career
Years	Team	Apps	(Points)
2022–	Mie Pearls		
International career
Years	Team	Apps	(Points)
2019–	Japan	18	(10)

Kyoko Hosokawa (born 8 July 1999) is a Japanese rugby union player. She has competed for Japan at the 2021 and 2025 Women's Rugby World Cups.

== Early career ==
Hosokawa played tennis until junior high school and graduated from Kobe Kohoku High School in 2018. She then enrolled at Nippon Sport Science University.

== Rugby career ==
Hosokawa made her international debut for Japan on 13 July 2019, she started in the match against the Wallaroos during their Australian tour.

She joined the Mie Pearls in 2022 after graduating from Nippon Sport Science University. She scored a try in Japan's 12–10 victory against Australia at Bond University in May 2022. The win meant that the Sakura's finished their tour of Australia unbeaten. In September that year, she was selected for Japan's squad to the delayed 2021 Rugby World Cup in New Zealand. She scored her sides only try in their final pool game loss to Italy.

On 28 July 2025, she was named in the Japanese side to the Women's Rugby World Cup in England.
