= Ngalula Fuamba =

Canadian rugby player (born 1994)

- Born: 28 November 1994 (age 31)
- Height: 1.75 m (5 ft 9 in)

Rugby union career
- Position: Lock
International career
Years	Team	Apps	(Points)
	Canada	13	(0)

Ngalula Fuamba (born 28 November 1994) is a Canadian rugby union player.

Fuamba competed for Canada at the delayed 2021 Rugby World Cup in New Zealand. She featured against the Eagles in the quarterfinals, and against England in the semifinal stage.
