= Komachi Imakugi =

Japan international rugby union player

- Born: 6 January 2002 (age 24)
- Height: 158 cm (5 ft 2 in)
- Weight: 60 kg (132 lb; 9 st 6 lb)

Rugby union career
- Position: Wing
Senior career
| Years | Team | Apps | (Points) |
| | Arukas Queen Kumagaya | | (0) |
International career
| Years | Team | Apps | (Points) |
| 2019– | Japan | 33 | (32) |

Komachi Imakugi (born 6 January 2002) is a Japanese rugby union player. She competed for Japan at the 2021 and 2025 Women's Rugby World Cups.

== Early life ==
Imakugi played tag rugby in elementary school, she started playing rugby at Otowa Junior High School. She played club rugby for Kyoto Joinus. She graduated from Iwamichisuikan High School in 2020, she then entered Rissho University.

== Rugby career ==
On 13 July 2019, she made her international debut for Japan against Australia in their Australian tour. She was still in her third year of High School when she earned her first cap. She got her second cap in the last game of the two-test series, Australia won both games.

In August 2022, Ireland toured Japan in a two-test series. She scored a try in the first test despite her side being trounced 57–22. She also featured in the second test which Japan won after defeating Ireland 29–10. Imakugi was selected for Japan's squad to the delayed 2021 Rugby World Cup that was held in New Zealand. She scored a try and kicked the conversion against the United States in their pool match, Japan lost 30–17.

In April 2025, she played her 30th test against the United States at Wallis Annenberg Stadium in Los Angeles. On 28 July, she was named in the Sakura's squad to the Women's Rugby World Cup in England.
