= Misaki Suzuki =

Japan international rugby union player

- Born: 9 April 1992 (age 34)
- Height: 1.63 m (5 ft 4 in)
- Weight: 64 kg (141 lb)

Rugby union career
- Position: Forward
Amateur team(s)
Years	Team	Apps	(Points)
	Auckland Marist		(0)
Senior career
Years	Team	Apps	(Points)
	Tokyo Sankyu Phoenix		(0)
Provincial / State sides
Years	Team	Apps	(Points)
2018	Auckland	7	(0)
International career
Years	Team	Apps	(Points)
2010–	Japan	31	(0)
National sevens team
Years	Team		Comps
2010–	Japan		4

Misaki Suzuki (born 9 April 1992) is a Japanese rugby union player. She plays for Japan internationally and at club level for Tokyo Sankyu Phoenix. She has competed for Japan at the 2017 and 2021 Rugby World Cups.

== Early career ==
Suzuki was born in Kanagawa Prefecture and started playing rugby at 13 in her first year of junior high school. She graduated from Funabashi Municipal High School in Chiba Prefecture in 2011 and entered Kanto Gakuin University. After graduating from Kanto Gakuin University in 2015, she joined NTT Facilities.

== Rugby career ==
=== 2010–13 ===
Suzuki was selected to represent Japan in rugby sevens at the 2010 Asian Games in Guangzhou, China where they finished in fifth place. She also represented Japan in fifteens that same year.

In 2012, she became the captain of Japan's 15-a-side women's national team. She was named in Japan's sevens squad for the 2013 Rugby World Cup Sevens in Moscow, Russia.

=== 2017–18 ===
Suzuki was part of the Japanese squad that won the 2017 Asia Rugby Women's Championship, she played in the second test against Hong Kong. She was then selected to play on the side for the 2017 Rugby World Cup in Ireland. In 2018, she played for Auckland in the Farah Palmer Cup.

=== 2022 ===
Suzuki was named in the Sakura Fifteens team to tour Australia in April. She came off the bench in the match against Australia, her side stunned the Wallaroos 12–10. She then captained the Sakuras five days later against an Australian Barbarians side, and scored the match winning try to help her team win 24–10. Japan hosted South Africa and Ireland in July and August. Suzuki was named on the bench in both games against the Springbok Women. In August, she started at blind-side Flanker in the first of two tests against Ireland, her side went down 22–57.

Suzuki was selected to represent Japan at the delayed Rugby World Cup in New Zealand. She came off the bench in her sole World Cup appearance in the Sakuras opening match against Canada, she played at Prop.
