= Mana Furuta =

Japan international rugby union player

- Born: 16 November 1997 (age 28)
- Height: 1.67 m (5 ft 6 in)
- Weight: 68 kg (150 lb)

Rugby union career
- Position: Centre
Senior career
Years	Team	Apps	(Points)
2020	Arukas Queen Kumagaya		(0)
2021	Tokyo Sankyu Phoenix		(0)
Super Rugby
Years	Team	Apps	(Points)
2022	Brumbies Women		(0)
International career
Years	Team	Apps	(Points)
2016–	Japan	39	(15)
National sevens team
Years	Team		Comps
- Japan

Mana Furuta (古田真菜 born 16 November 1997) is a Japanese rugby union and sevens player. She plays centre for the Japan women's national rugby union team. She competed for Japan at the 2021 and 2025 Women's Rugby World Cups.

== Early career ==
Furuta is a native of Fukuoka Prefecture and her father also played rugby.

== Rugby career ==
Furuta debuted for Japan at the age of 18 during the 2016 Asia Rugby Championship. She missed the 2017 Rugby World Cup, but returned to the team in 2019.

In November 2021, she was part of the team that was announced for the end-of-year tour of Europe, where she scored her first test try in her sides narrow defeat to Ireland.

In 2020, she began her professional career playing for Arukas Queen Kumagaya's sevens team. She then joined Tokyo Sankyu Phoenix in 2021 and was on loan to the Brumbies Women in 2022. She was chosen by her teammates for the Helen Taylor Award after an outstanding season for the Brumbies.

She featured for Japan at the delayed 2021 Rugby World Cup that was held in New Zealand.

In 2023, she was named in the Sakura XV's side for the Asia Rugby Championship in Kazakhstan. She was a member of the side that narrowly beat Italy for the first time in September. In October, she was selected for the side for the inaugural 2023 WXV 2 tournament in South Africa.

2024 saw her make the Sakura's squad again for the Asia Rugby Championship in Hong Kong.

In 2025, she was named in the Sakura fifteens squad for their tour to the United States. She eventually started in the test against the Eagles in Los Angeles on 26 April 2025, they won 39–33. On 28 July 2025, she was named in the Japanese side to the Women's Rugby World Cup in England.
