= 2023 Pacific Four Series squads =

The 2023 Pacific Four Series is the 3rd edition of the Pacific Four Series, an annual rugby union competition sanctioned by World Rugby and contested by the national teams of Australia, Canada, New Zealand and the United States. The Black Ferns are the defending Champions having won their first title in 2022.

Note: Number of caps are indicated as of the first match of the tournament (1 April 2023).

== Australia ==
The Wallaroos announced their 31-player squad for the Pacific Four Series on 15 June.

Player	Position	Date of birth (age)	Caps	Club
Ashley Marsters	Hooker	2 November 1993 (aged 29)	20	(Australia) Melbourne Rebels
Tania Naden	Hooker	20 February 1992 (aged 31)	3	(Australia) ACT Brumbies
Adiana Talakai	Hooker	24 February 1999 (aged 24)	10	(Australia) NSW Waratahs
Bree-Anna Cheatham	Prop	29 March 1997 (aged 26)	2	(Australia) Queensland Reds
Bridie O'Gorman	Prop	8 December 1998 (aged 24)	12	(Australia) NSW Waratahs
Eva Karpani	Prop	18 June 1996 (aged 26)	14	(Australia) NSW Waratahs
Emily Robinson	Prop	6 February 1993 (aged 30)	19	(Australia) NSW Waratahs
Madison Schuck	Prop	8 October 1991 (aged 31)	5	(Australia) Queensland Reds
Annabelle Codey	Lock	3 February 1997 (aged 26)	3	(Australia) Queensland Reds
Kaitlan Leaney	Lock	10 October 2000 (aged 22)	8	(England) Harlequins
Michaela Leonard	Lock	6 March 1995 (aged 28)	15	(Australia) Western Force
Sera Naiqama	Lock	26 July 1995 (aged 27)	7	(Australia) NSW Waratahs
Emily Chancellor	Loose forward	20 August 1991 (aged 31)	16	(England) Harlequins
Piper Duck (c)	Loose forward	2 April 2001 (aged 21)	10	(Australia) NSW Waratahs
Grace Hamilton	Loose forward	4 March 1992 (aged 31)	26	(Australia) NSW Waratahs
Leilani Nathan	Loose forward	20 July 2000 (aged 22)	uncapped	(Australia) NSW Waratahs
Siokapesi Palu	Loose forward	15 October 1996 (aged 26)	2	(Australia) ACT Brumbies
Tabua Tuinakauvadra	Loose forward	27 December 2002 (aged 20)	1	(Australia) ACT Brumbies
Jasmin Huriwai	Scrum-half	27 September 1993 (aged 29)	1	(Australia) ACT Brumbies
Layne Morgan	Scrum-half	20 April 1999 (aged 23)	12	(Australia) NSW Waratahs
Carys Dallinger	Fly-half	30 April 2000 (aged 22)	1	(Australia) Queensland Reds
Arabella McKenzie	Fly-half	1 March 1999 (aged 24)	15	(England) Harlequins
Faitala Moleka	Fly-half	29 January 2005 (aged 18)	1	(Australia) ACT Brumbies
Georgina Friedrichs	Centre	14 April 1995 (aged 27)	12	(Australia) NSW Waratahs
Trilleen Pomare	Centre	5 April 1993 (aged 29)	21	(Australia) Western Force
Cecilia Smith	Centre	13 March 1994 (aged 29)	6	(Australia) Queensland Reds
Ivania Wong	Wing	23 September 1997 (aged 25)	8	(Australia) Queensland Reds
Desiree Miller	Wing	13 January 2002 (aged 21)	uncapped	(Australia) NSW Waratahs
Maya Stewart	Wing	14 March 2000 (aged 23)	2	(Australia) NSW Waratahs
Alana Elisaia	Outside back	26 April 1996 (aged 26)	2	(Australia) Queensland Reds
Lori Cramer	Utility back	8 March 1993 (aged 30)	15	(England) Exeter Chiefs

== Canada ==
On 15 March, Kevin Rouet named a 30-player squad for their Spain tour and for the Pacific Four Series opener against the United States in Madrid. On 3 July, Canada announced their 30-member squad for the Pacific Four Series matches in Ottawa.

Notes:

‡ Indicates players that were not selected for the second leg. new — indicates players that joined the team in the second leg.

Player	Position	Date of birth (age)	Club
Gillian Boag	Hooker	19 February 1995 (aged 28)	(Canada) Capilano RFC
Mya Brubacher new	Hooker		(Canada) Kingston Panthers / (Canada) Queen's University
Sara Cline new	Hooker	21 May 1997 (aged 25)	(Canada) Leprechaun Tigers
Holly Phillips ‡	Hooker		(England) Bristol Bears
Emily Tuttosi	Hooker	21 September 1995 (aged 27)	(England) Exeter Chiefs
Olivia DeMerchant new	Prop	16 February 1991 (aged 32)	(Canada) Halifax Tars RFC
Alexandria Ellis	Prop	1 August 1995 (aged 27)	(England) Saracens
Brittany Kassil ‡	Prop	14 March 1991 (aged 32)	(Canada) Guelph Redcoats RFC
DaLeaka Menin	Prop	16 June 1995 (aged 27)	(England) Exeter Chiefs
Maya Montiel ‡	Prop		(England) Saracens
Zoe Williams ‡	Prop		(Canada) Westshore RFC / (Canada) University of Victoria
Cassandra Tuffnail ‡	Prop		(England) Richmond
Tyson Beukeboom	Lock	10 March 1991 (aged 32)	(Canada) Cowichan RFC
McKinley Hunt new	Lock	5 January 1997 (aged 26)	(Canada) Aurora Barbarians
Ashlynn Smith new	Lock		(Canada) University of Calgary
Emma Taylor	Lock	9 July 1992 (aged 30)	(Canada) Halifax Tars RFC
Pamphinette Buisa ‡	Back row	28 December 1996 (aged 26)	(Canada) Ottawa Irish
Sophie de Goede	Back row	30 June 1999 (aged 23)	(Canada) Castaway Wanderers RFC
Marie-Pier Fauteux ‡	Back row		(Canada) Club de rugby de Québec / (Canada) Université Laval
Fabiola Forteza	Back row	4 August 1995 (aged 27)	(France) Stade Bordelais
Courtney Holtkamp	Back row	25 April 1999 (aged 23)	(Canada) Red Deer Titans Rugby
Laetitia Royer	Back row	9 February 1991 (aged 32)	(France) ASM Romagnat
Gabrielle Senft new	Back row	13 June 1997 (aged 25)	(England) Exeter Chiefs
Sara Svoboda	Back row	3 February 1995 (aged 28)	(England) Loughborough Lightning
Olivia Apps new	Scrum-half	1 December 1998 (aged 24)	(Canada) Lindsay RFC
Justine Blatt-Janmaat ‡	Scrum-half		(Canada) Westshore RFC / (Canada) University of Victoria
Justine Pelletier	Scrum-half	27 February 2001 (aged 22)	(France) Stade Bordelais
Claire Gallagher new	Fly-half		(Canada) Aurora Barbarians / (Canada) University of Ottawa
Sarah-Maude Lachance	Fly-half	7 December 1998 (aged 24)	(France) Lons Section Paloise
Julia Schell	Fly-half	13 July 1996 (aged 26)	(Canada) Castaway Wanderers RFC
Alex Tessier ‡	Fly-half	3 September 1993 (aged 29)	(Canada) Sainte-Anne-de-Bellevue RFC
Fancy Bermudez	Centre	27 May 2002 (aged 20)	(Canada) Westshore RFC
Audrey Champagne ‡	Centre		(Canada) Club de rugby de Québec / (Canada) Université Laval
Mahalia Robinson ‡	Centre		(Canada) TMRRFC / (Canada) Concordia Université
Shoshanah Seumanutafa new	Centre		(Canada) University of British Columbia
Sara Kaljuvee	Centre	7 February 1993 (aged 30)	(Canada) Toronto Scottish RFC / (Canada) Westshore RFC
Paige Farries	Wing	12 August 1994 (aged 28)	(England) Worcester Warriors
Sabrina Poulin	Wing	3 October 1992 (aged 30)	(Canada) TMRRFC / (Spain) Eibar Rugby Taldea
Florence Symonds new	Wing	20 May 2002 (aged 20)	(Canada) University of British Columbia
Alysha Corrigan new	Fullback	5 January 1997 (aged 26)	(Canada) CRFC
Madison Grant new	Outside back	12 March 2001 (aged 22)	(Canada) Cornwall Claymores
Renee Gonzalez ‡	Outside back	14 July 1998 (aged 24)	(Canada) Westshore RFC / (Canada) University of Victoria

== New Zealand ==
The Black Ferns named their 30-member squad on 7 June.

Player	Position	Date of birth (age)	Caps	Club / Province
Luka Connor	Hooker	24 September 1996 (aged 26)	14	(New Zealand) Chiefs Manawa / Bay of Plenty
Grace Gago	Hooker	5 May 1998 (aged 24)	uncapped	(New Zealand) Blues / Counties Manukau
Georgia Ponsonby	Hooker	14 December 1999 (aged 23)	13	(New Zealand) Matatū / Canterbury
Kate Henwood	Prop	28 January 1989 (aged 34)	uncapped	(New Zealand) Chiefs Manawa / Bay of Plenty
Philippa Love	Prop	8 April 1990 (aged 32)	25	(New Zealand) Matatū / Canterbury
Krystal Murray	Prop	16 June 1993 (aged 29)	9	(New Zealand) Hurricanes Poua / Northland
Amy Rule	Prop	15 July 2000 (aged 22)	12	(New Zealand) Matatū / Canterbury
Esther Faiaoga-Tilo	Prop	26 September 1994 (aged 28)	uncapped	(New Zealand) Blues / Waikato
Tanya Kalounivale	Prop	20 January 1999 (aged 24)	6	(New Zealand) Chiefs Manawa / Waikato
Chelsea Bremner	Lock	11 April 1995 (aged 27)	12	(New Zealand) Matatū / Canterbury
Joanah Ngan-Woo	Lock	15 December 1995 (aged 27)	17	(New Zealand) Hurricanes Poua / Wellington
Maiakawanakaulani Roos	Lock	27 July 2001 (aged 21)	14	(New Zealand) Blues / Auckland
Alana Bremner	Loose forward	10 February 1997 (aged 26)	13	(New Zealand) Matatū / Canterbury
Lucy Jenkins	Loose forward	30 November 2000 (aged 22)	uncapped	(New Zealand) Matatū / Canterbury
Kendra Reynolds	Loose forward	25 January 1993 (aged 30)	9	(New Zealand) Matatū / Bay of Plenty
Kennedy Simon (cc)	Loose forward	1 October 1996 (aged 26)	13	(New Zealand) Chiefs Manawa / Waikato
Liana Mikaele-Tu'u	Loose forward	2 March 2002 (aged 21)	11	(New Zealand) Blues / Auckland
Arihiana Marino-Tauhinu	Scrum-half	29 March 1992 (aged 31)	12	(New Zealand) Chiefs Manawa / Counties Manukau
Iritana Hohaia	Scrum-half	1 March 2000 (aged 23)	uncapped	(New Zealand) Hurricanes Poua / Taranaki
Ruahei Demant (cc)	First five-eighth	21 April 1995 (aged 27)	26	(New Zealand) Blues / Auckland
Rosie Kelly	First five-eighth	16 January 2000 (aged 23)	uncapped	(New Zealand) Matatū / Canterbury
Grace Brooker	Centre	20 June 1999 (aged 23)	3	(New Zealand) Matatū / Canterbury
Sylvia Brunt	Centre	1 January 2004 (aged 19)	7	(New Zealand) Blues / Auckland
Amy du Plessis	Centre	7 July 1999 (aged 23)	7	(New Zealand) Matatū / Canterbury
Kelsey Teneti	Centre	12 May 2003 (aged 19)	1	(New Zealand) Waikato
Renee Holmes	Outside back	21 December 1999 (aged 23)	10	(New Zealand) Matatū / Waikato
Ayesha Leti-I'iga	Outside back	3 January 1999 (aged 24)	21	(New Zealand) Hurricanes Poua / Wellington
Mererangi Paul	Outside back	29 October 1998 (aged 24)	uncapped	(New Zealand) Chiefs Manawa / Counties Manukau
Katelyn Vaha'akolo	Outside back	18 April 2000 (aged 22)	uncapped	(New Zealand) Blues / Auckland
Tenika Willison	Outside back	7 December 1997 (aged 25)	uncapped	(New Zealand) Chiefs Manawa / Waikato

== United States ==
On 1 March, the Eagles named their 30-player traveling roster for their Spain tour and for the Pacific Four Series opener against Canada. On 17 June interim Head Coach, Rich Ashfield, named his 30-member squad for the second leg of the Pacific Four series.

Notes:

‡ Indicates players that were not selected for the second leg. new — indicates players that joined the team in the second leg.

Player	Position	Date of birth (age)	Caps	Club
Jett Hayward	Hooker	22 April 1997 (aged 25)	uncapped	(United States) Life West Gladiatrix
Joanna Kitlinski ‡	Hooker	5 July 1988 (aged 34)		(England) Sale Sharks
Kathryn Treder	Hooker	13 March 1996 (aged 27)		(England) DMP Sharks
Joanne Fa'avesi new	Front row	5 February 1992 (aged 31)		USA Sevens
Tiara A'au	Prop		uncapped	(United States) New York Rugby Club
Catie Benson	Prop	10 February 1992 (aged 31)		(England) Sale Sharks
Charli Jacoby	Prop	9 October 1989 (aged 33)		(England) Exeter Chiefs
Erica Jarrell new	Prop	25 February 1999 (aged 24)	uncapped	(United States) Beantown RFC
Maya Learned ‡	Prop	1 January 1996 (aged 27)		(England) Gloucester-Hartpury
Hope Rogers	Prop	7 January 1993 (aged 30)		(England) Exeter Chiefs
Keia Mae Sagapiolu	Prop	12 May 2000 (aged 22)	uncapped	(United States) Central Washington University
Evelyn Ashenbrucker	Lock	6 August 1990 (aged 32)		(United States) San Diego Surfers
Jenny Kronish ‡	Lock	27 December 1996 (aged 26)		(England) Harlequins
Megan Neyen ‡	Lock		uncapped	(United States) Beantown RFC
Hallie Taufo'ou new	Lock	26 May 1994 (aged 28)		(United States) Beantown RFC
Alycia Washington	Lock	18 November 1990 (aged 32)		(England) Sale Sharks
Tahlia Brody	Back row	10 September 1994 (aged 28)	uncapped	(England) Cheltenham Tigers
Rachel Ehrecke	Back row	6 December 1999 (aged 23)		(England) DMP Sharks
Sophia Haley ‡	Back row	15 May 2000 (aged 22)	uncapped	(United States) Dartmouth College
Rachel Johnson	Back row	5 February 1991 (aged 32)		(England) Exeter Chiefs
Georgie Perris-Redding	Back row	1 October 1997 (aged 25)		(England) Sale Sharks
Paluvava'u Freda Tafuna new	Back row		uncapped	(United States) Lindenwood University
Kate Zackary (c)	Back row	26 July 1989 (aged 33)		(England) Exeter Chiefs
Olivia Ortiz	Scrum-half	23 October 1997 (aged 25)		(England) DMP Sharks
Taina Tukuafu new	Scrum-half	18 August 2001 (aged 21)	uncapped	(United States) Lindenwood University
Carly Waters	Scrum-half	19 December 1995 (aged 27)		(England) Sale Sharks
Kristin Bitter	Fly-half		uncapped	(United States) Dartmouth College
McKenzie Hawkins	Fly-half	8 January 1997 (aged 26)		(United States) Colorado Greywolves
Meya Bizer ‡	Centre	10 May 1993 (aged 29)		(England) DMP Sharks
Gabby Cantorna ‡	Centre	2 August 1995 (aged 27)		(England) Exeter Chiefs
Eti Haungatau	Centre	25 September 2000 (aged 22)		(England) Sale Sharks
Emily Henrich new	Centre	10 November 1999 (aged 23)		(United States) Dartmouth College
Summer Harris-Jones	Outside back	27 June 1996 (aged 26)	uncapped	USA Sevens
Lotte Clapp	Outside back	13 January 1995 (aged 28)		(England) Saracens
Autumn Czaplicki ‡	Outside back	4 November 1999 (aged 23)	uncapped	USA Sevens
Jennine Detiveaux new	Outside back	12 October 1993 (aged 29)		(United States) Knoxville Minx
Tess Feury	Outside back	15 March 1996 (aged 27)		(England) DMP Sharks
Bulou Mataitoga	Outside back	8 April 1994 (aged 28)		(England) Loughborough Lightning
