= 2021 Pacific Four Series =

Tournament details
- Host: United States
- Date: 1 – 5 November 2021
- Countries: Canada; United States

Final positions
- Champions: Canada (1st title)

Tournament statistics
- Matches played: 2
- Tries scored: 7 (3.5 per match)
- Top scorer(s): (Canada) Sophie de Goede (16)
- Most tries: (Canada) Karen Paquin (2)

The 2021 Pacific Four Series was the first edition of the Pacific Four Series. The soft launch of the competition involved only Canada and the United States contesting two matches in Glendale, Colorado. The winner was determined on aggregate score. Canada won the two matches on an aggregate of 22–41.

Australia and New Zealand were initially confirmed to join the competition, but because of the COVID-19 pandemic, World Rugby decided to go ahead with the soft launch with Australia and New Zealand joining in 2022.

== Results ==
=== Day 1 ===
1 November 2021
18:00 MDT (UTC−06:00)

United States	9–15	Canada
Pen: Foster (3/4) 23', 43', 58'		Try: Gonzalez 18' m Paquin 35' c Con: de Goede (1/1) 36'; Pen: de Goede (1/1) 61'

Infinity Park, Glendale
Referee: Julianne Zussman (Canada)

Team details

FB	15	McKenzie Hawkins
RW	14	Tess Feury	(substituted off) 55'
OC	13	Alev Kelter
IC	12	Gabby Cantorna
LW	11	Sarah Levy
FH	10	Megan Foster	(substituted off) 68'
SH	9	Carly Waters	(substituted off) 55'
N8	8	Kate Zackary (c)
OF	7	Rachel Johnson
BF	6	Rachel Ehrecke	(substituted off) 61'
RL	5	Alycia Washington
LL	4	Jenny Kronish	(substituted off) 54'
TP	3	Charli Jacoby	(substituted off) 54'
HK	2	Joanna Kitlinski	(substituted off) 62'
LP	1	Hope Rogers	(substituted off) 71'
Replacements:
HK	16	Saher Hamdan	(substituted on) 62'
PR	17	Maya Learned	(substituted on) 54'
PR	18	Nick James	(substituted on) 71'
LK	19	Kristine Sommer	(substituted on) 54'
FL	20	Elizabeth Cairns	(substituted on) 61'
SH	21	Olivia Ortiz	(substituted on) 55'
FH	22	Joanne Fa'avesi	(substituted on) 68'
FB	23	Ilona Maher	(substituted on) 55'
Coach:
Rob Cain

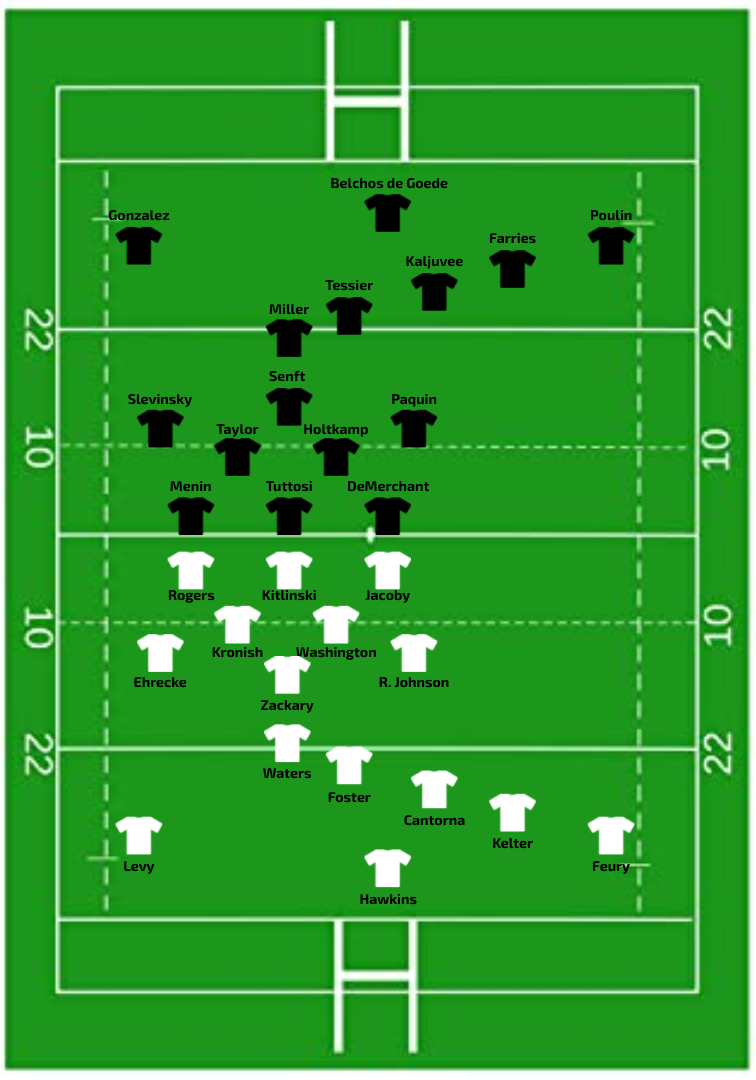

FB	15	Emily Belchos de Geode
RW	14	Renee Gonzalez	(substituted off) 67'
OC	13	Paige Farries
IC	12	Sara Kaljuvee	(substituted off) 69'
LW	11	Sabrina Poulin
FH	10	Alexandra Tessier
SH	9	Brianna Miller	(substituted off) 69'
N8	8	Gabby Senft
OF	7	Karen Paquin
BF	6	Janna Slevinsky	(substituted off) 4'
RL	5	Emma Taylor
LL	4	Courtney Holtkamp	(substituted off) 55'
TP	3	DaLeaka Menin	(substituted off) 61'
HK	2	Emily Tuttosi	(substituted off) 54'
LP	1	Olivia DeMerchant (c)	(substituted off) 54'
Replacements:
HK	16	Gillian Boag	(substituted on) 54'
PR	17	Brittany Kassil	(substituted on) 54'
PR	18	Alexandra Ellis	(substituted on) 61'
LK	19	Tyson Beukeboom	(substituted on) 55'
N8	20	Sophie de Goede	(substituted on) 4'
SH	21	Justine Pelletier	(substituted on) 69'
FH	22	Nakisa Levale	(substituted on) 69'
FB	23	Sarah-Maude Lachance	(substituted on) 67'
Coach:
Sandro Fiorino

Player of the Match: Sophie de Goede (Canada)

=== Day 2 ===
5 November 2021
18:00 MDT (UTC−06:00)

United States	13–26	Canada
Try: Zackary 2' c Con: Cantorna (1/1) 3'; Pen: Cantorna (2/2) 28', 44'		Try: de Goede 5' c Holtkamp 9' m Ellis 30' c Paquin 69' c Con: de Goede (3/4) 7', 32', 71'

Infinity Park, Glendale
Referee: Kat Roche (United States)

Team details

FB	15	McKenzie Hawkins		(substituted off) 56'
RW	14	Ilona Maher
OC	13	Alev Kelter
IC	12	Katana Howard		(substituted off) 56'
LW	11	Bulou Mataitoga
FH	10	Gabby Cantorna		(substituted off) 69'
SH	9	Carly Waters		(substituted off) 56'
N8	8	Kate Zackary (c)
OF	7	Rachel Johnson
BF	6	Elizabeth Cairns	(yellow card) 38' to 48'	(substituted off) 56'
RL	5	Kristine Sommer
LL	4	Jenny Kronish		(substituted off) 48'
TP	3	Nick James		(substituted off) 48'
HK	2	Saher Hamdan
LP	1	Hope Rogers		(substituted off) 75'
Replacements:
HK	16	Catherine Benson		(substituted on) 75'
PR	17	Charli Jacoby		(substituted on) 48'
PR	18	Maya Learned		(substituted on) 69'
LK	19	Hallie Taufo'ou		(substituted on) 48'
FL	20	Kathryn Johnson		(substituted on) 56'
SH	21	Olivia Ortiz		(substituted on) 56'
FH	22	Amy Bonté		(substituted on) 56'
FB	23	Kayla Canett		(substituted on) 56'
Coach:
Rob Cain

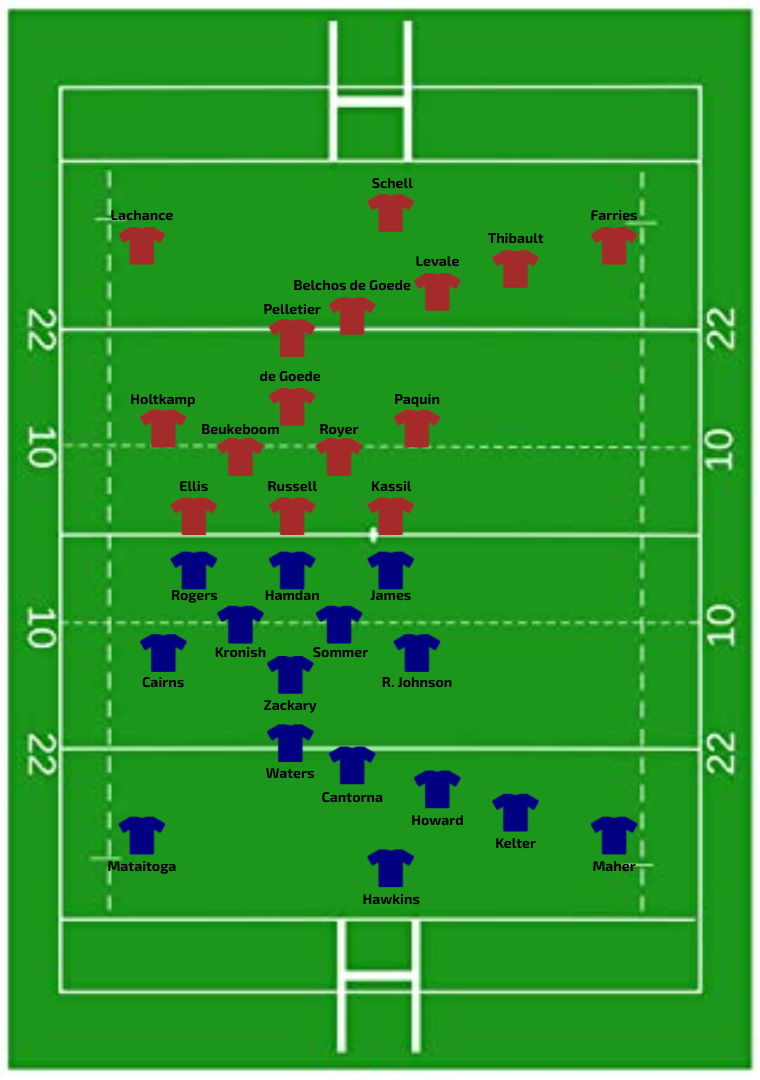

FB	15	Julia Schell
RW	14	Sarah-Maude Lachance		(substituted off) 56'
OC	13	Marie Thibault
IC	12	Nakisa Levale		(substituted on) 52'
LW	11	Paige Farries
FH	10	Emily Belchos de Goede
SH	9	Justine Pelletier		(substituted on) 52'
N8	8	Sophie de Goede
OF	7	Karen Paquin
BF	6	Courtney Holtkamp
RL	5	Tyson Beukeboom		(substituted off) 70'
LL	4	Laetitia Royer	(yellow card) 50' to 60'	(yellow card) 64' (yellow-red card)
TP	3	Alexandra Ellis		(substituted off) 47'
HK	2	Laura Russell		(substituted off) 47'
LP	1	Brittany Kassil		(substituted off) 47'
Replacements:
HK	16	Veronica Harrigan		(substituted on) 47'
PR	17	Mikiela Nelson		(substituted on) 47'
PR	18	Emma Taylor		(substituted on) 70'
LK	19	DaLeaka Menin		(substituted on) 47'
FL	20	Gabby Senft
SH	21	Alexandra Tessier		(substituted on) 52'
FH	22	Brianna Miller		(substituted on) 52'
FB	23	Renee Gonzalez		(substituted on) 56'
Coach:
Sandro Fiorino

Player of the Match: Karen Paquin (Canada)

== Player statistics ==
=== Points ===
Rank	Name	Team	Points
1	Sophie de Goede	Canada	16
2	Karen Paquin	Canada	10
3	Megan Foster	United States	9
4	Gabby Cantorna	United States	8
5	Alexandra Ellis	Canada	5
5	Renee Gonzalez	Canada	5
5	Courtney Holtkamp	Canada	5
5	Kate Zackary	United States	5

=== Tries ===
Rank	Name	Team	Tries
1	Karen Paquin	Canada	2
2	Sophie de Goede	Canada	1
2	Alexandra Ellis	Canada	1
2	Renee Gonzalez	Canada	1
2	Courtney Holtkamp	Canada	1
2	Kate Zackary	United States	1
