= History of women's rugby union matches between Canada and the United States =

Canada and the United States played the first-ever women's test outside of Europe in Victoria, British Columbia on 14 November 1987. They have played each other 48 times since their first game, with Canada winning 29 matches and the Eagles only 19. They have met at three Rugby World Cup's on four occasions — 1998, 2010, and twice at the delayed 2021 Rugby World Cup that was held in New Zealand in 2022.

The USA won nine consecutive matches from 1987 to 1999, whereas Canada have exceeded that feat by beating their North American rivals 11 times in a row since November 2019. The fixture also holds the attendance record for a standalone women's rugby match in North America, which was set in Ottawa on 1 August 2025, when Canada defeated the United States in front of a crowd of 11,453.

== Summary ==
=== Overall ===
Details	Played	Won by Canada	Won by United States	Drawn	Canada points	United States points
In Canada	16	8	8	0	314	323
In the United States	23	15	8	0	477	270
Neutral venue	9	6	3	0	215	146
Overall	48	29	19	0	1,006	739

=== Record ===
Note: Date shown in brackets indicates when the record was or last set.

Record	Canada	United States
Longest winning streak	11 (20 November 2019–Present)	9 (14 Nov 1987–13 Oct 1999)
Largest points for
Home	51 (15 April 2014)	29 (14 August 2013)
Away	52 (24 November 2019)	60 (12 June 1993)
Neutral venue	50 (1 April 2023)	46 (12 May 1998)
Largest winning margin
Home	46 (15 April 2014)	16 (8 August 1988)
Away	43 (28 April 2024)	57 (12 June 1993)
Neutral venue	33 (1 April 2023)	40 (12 May 1998)

== Results ==
No.	Date	Venue	Score	Winner	Competition
1	14 November 1987	Victoria, British Columbia	3 – 22	United States	
2	8 August 1988	Saranac Lake, New York	26 – 10	United States	
3	3 September 1989	Edmonton, Alberta	3 – 28	United States	
4	13 September 1992	Blaine, Minnesota	13 – 12	United States	
5	12 June 1993	Markham, Ontario	3 – 60	United States	1993 Canada Cup
6	14 September 1996	Edmonton, Alberta	14 – 22	United States	1996 Canada Cup
7	6 July 1997	Ajax, Ontario	12 – 21	United States	
8	12 May 1998	Amsterdam, Netherlands	6 – 46	United States	1998 Rugby World Cup semi-final
9	8 August 1999	Saranac Lake, New York	16 – 11	United States	
10	13 October 1999	Palmerston North, New Zealand	18 – 15	Canada	Triangular '99
11	6 June 2000	New York City	10 – 17	Canada	
12	30 September 2000	Winnipeg, Manitoba	9 – 15	United States	2000 Canada Cup
13	7 July 2001	Twin Elm Park, Ottawa	23 – 3	Canada	2001 Summer International
14	5 August 2001	Saranac Lake, New York	22 – 21	United States	2001 Summer International
15	20 June 2003	Thunderbird Stadium, Vancouver	18 – 13	Canada	2003 Churchill Cup
16	19 June 2004	Edmonton, Alberta	10 – 29	United States	2004 Churchill Cup third place play-off
17	10 June 2006	Boulder, Colorado	25 – 10	United States	2006 Summer International
18	13 June 2006	Boulder, Colorado	18 – 20	Canada	2006 Summer International
19	27 August 2007	Blaine, Minnesota	5 – 18	Canada	2007 Summer International
20	29 August 2007	Blaine, Minnesota	7 – 45	Canada	2007 Summer International
21	26 August 2008	Molesey Road, Esher, England	15 – 0	Canada	2008 Nations Cup
22	27 June 2009	Infinity Park, Glendale	17 – 25	Canada	
23	19 August 2009	Appleby College, Oakville	10 – 15	United States	2009 Nations Cup
24	12 January 2010	Lakeland, Florida	8 – 18	Canada	
25	16 January 2010	Lakeland, Florida	11 – 10	Canada	
26	14 June 2010	Shawnigan Lake School, Vancouver Island	14 – 8	Canada	2010 Summer International
27	16 June 2010	Bear Mountain Stadium, Langford	34 – 22	Canada	2010 Summer International
28	5 September 2010	Surrey Sports Park, Guildford, England	20 – 23	United States	2010 Rugby World Cup fifth place play-off
29	5 August 2011	Chatham-Kent, Ontario	35 – 17	Canada	2011 Nations Cup
30	4 August 2013	University of Northern Colorado, Greenley	29 – 17	United States	2013 Nations Cup
31	15 April 2014	Shawnigan Lake School, Vancouver Island	51 – 7	Canada	2014 Summer International
32	19 April 2014	Westhills Stadium, Langford	14 – 10	Canada	2014 Summer International
33	1 July 2015	Red Deer Titans Rugby Park, Red Deer	28 – 36	United States	
34	5 July 2016	Regional Athletic Complex, Salt Lake City	33 – 5	Canada	2016 Women's Rugby Super Series
35	28 March 2017	Chula Vista, San Diego	5 – 39	Canada	
36	1 April 2017	Chula Vista, San Diego	10 – 37	Canada	
37	10 July 2019	Chula Vista, San Diego	18 – 20	United States	2019 Women's Rugby Super Series
38	20 November 2019	Chula Vista, San Diego	0 – 19	Canada	2019 Autumn International
39	24 November 2019	Chula Vista, San Diego	27 – 52	Canada	2019 Autumn International
40	1 November 2021	Infinity Park, Glendale	9 – 15	Canada	2021 Pacific Four Series
41	5 November 2021	Infinity Park, Glendale	13 – 26	Canada	2021 Pacific Four Series
42	6 June 2022	Tauranga Domain, Tauranga, New Zealand	36 – 5	Canada	2022 Pacific Four Series
43	23 October 2022	The Trusts Arena, Auckland, New Zealand	29 – 14	Canada	2021 Rugby World Cup pool stage
44	30 October 2022	The Trusts Arena, Auckland, New Zealand	32 – 11	Canada	2021 Rugby World Cup quarter-final
45	1 April 2023	Estadio Nacional Complutense, Madrid, Spain	50 – 17	Canada	2023 Pacific Four Series
46	28 April 2024	Dignity Health Sports Park, Carson	7 – 50	Canada	2024 Pacific Four Series
47	2 May 2025	CPKC Stadium, Kansas City	14 – 26	Canada	2025 Pacific Four Series
48	1 August 2025	TD Place Stadium, Ottawa	42 – 10	Canada	2025 Rugby World Cup warm-up
