= History of women's rugby union matches between Canada and England =

Canada women and England women first competed against each other in 1993 in the Canada Cup. It is a rivalry that has been largely dominated by England, who have won 34 of the 38 games contested with a single draw. All three of Canada’s wins have been in the United States. They have notably played each other in the 2014 Women's Rugby World Cup final, as well as semi-finals of the 2002, 2006 and 2021 editions.

England and Canada clashed again in a second World Cup final in the 2025 edition with hosts, England, winning the tournament for their third title.

== Summary ==
=== Overall ===
Details	Played	Won by Canada	Won by England	Drawn	Canada points	England points
In Canada	13	2	11	0	168	288
In England	15	0	14	1	168	637
Neutral venue	13	3	9	1	171	343
Overall	41	5	34	2	507	1,268

=== Record ===
Note: Date shown in brackets indicates when the record was or last set.

Record	Canada	England
Longest winning streak	2 (30 Jul 2013–13 Nov 2013), (16-23 Oct 2026)	17 (10 Jun 1993–30 Jul 2013)
Largest points for
Home	19 (13 August 2011)	79 (17 November 2017)
Away	26 (19 September 2026)	41 (13 August 2011)
Neutral venue	52 (1 July 2016)	72 (5 May 1996)
Largest winning margin
Home	9 (23 October 2026)	74 (17 November 2017)
Away	N/A	24 (27 September 2000, 13 June 2004)
Neutral venue	35 (1 July 2016)	66 (5 May 1998)

== Results ==
No.	Date	Venue	Score	Winner	Competition
1	10 June 1993	Ajax Wanderers, Ajax	8 – 12	England	1993 Canada Cup
2	17 April 1994	Gala, Scotland	24 – 10	England	1994 Women's Rugby World Cup Quarter-Final
3	5 May 1998	Amsterdam, Netherlands	6 – 72	England	1998 Women's Rugby World Cup
4	16 May 1998	Amsterdam, Netherlands	15 – 31	England	1998 Women's Rugby World Cup Play-Off for 3rd Place
5	27 September 2000	Winnipeg	10 – 34	England	2000 Canada Cup
6	21 May 2002	Girona, Barcelona, Spain	10 – 53	England	2002 Women's Rugby World Cup Semi-Final
7	14 June 2003	Thunderbird Stadium, Vancouver	5 – 10	England	2003 Women's Churchill Cup
8	28 June 2003	Thunderbird Stadium, Vancouver	18 – 23	England	2003 Women's Churchill Cup Final
9	13 June 2004	Calgary Rugby Park, Calgary	11 – 35	England	2004 Women's Churchill Cup
10	14 November 2004	Richmond, London	45 – 5	England	2004 Autumn International
11	17 November 2004	Reading	41 – 3	England	2004 Autumn International
12	12 September 2006	Ellerslie Rugby Park, Edmonton	6 – 10	England	2006 Women's Rugby World Cup Semi-Final
13	24 August 2008	Molesey Road, Esher	43 – 9	England	2008 Nations Cup
14	29 August 2008	Molesey Road, Esher	24 – 0	England	
15	22 August 2009	Fletcher's Field, Toronto	0 – 22	England	2009 Nations Cup
16	9 August 2011	Appleby College, Oakville	10 – 22	England	2011 Nations Cup
17	13 August 2011	Appleby College, Oakville	19 – 41	England	2011 Nations Cup Final
18	30 July 2013	University of Northern Colorado, Greenley, United States	29 – 25	Canada	2013 Nations Cup
19	10 August 2013	Infinity Park, Glendale, United States	27 – 13	Canada	2013 Nations Cup Final
20	13 November 2013	Twickenham Stoop, London	32 – 3	England	2013 Autumn International
21	9 August 2014	CNR, Marcoussis, France	13 – 13	draw	2014 Women's Rugby World Cup
22	17 August 2014	Stade Jean-Bouin, Paris, France	21 – 9	England	2014 Women's Rugby World Cup Final
23	5 July 2015	Ellerslie Rugby Park, Edmonton	14 – 15	England	2015 Women's Rugby Super Series
24	1 July 2016	Regional Athletic Complex, Salt Lake City, United States	52 – 17	Canada	2016 Women's Rugby Super Series
25	26 November 2016	Twickenham Stadium, London	39 – 6	England	2016 Autumn International
26	13 June 2017	Rugby League Park, Christchurch, New Zealand	20 – 27	England	2017 Women's Rugby World Cup warm-up
27	17 November 2017	Barnet Copthall, London	79 – 5	England	2017 Autumn International
28	21 November 2017	Twickenham Stoop, London	49 – 12	England	2017 Autumn International
29	25 November 2017	Twickenham Stadium, London	69 – 19	England	2017 Autumn International
30	18 November 2018	Castle Park, Doncaster	27 – 19	England	2018 Autumn International
31	6 July 2019	Chula Vista, San Diego, United States	17 – 19	England	2019 Women's Rugby Super Series
32	14 November 2021	Twickenham Stoop, London	51 – 12	England	2021 Autumn International
33	5 November 2022	Eden Park, Auckland, New Zealand	19 – 26	England	2021 Rugby World Cup Semi-Final
34	23 September 2023	Sandy Park, Exeter	50 – 24	England	Test series
35	30 September 2023	Barnet Copthall, London	29 – 12	England	Test series
36	27 October 2023	Forsyth Barr Stadium, Dunedin, New Zealand	45 – 12	England	2023 WXV 1
37	12 October 2024	BC Place, Vancouver	21 – 12	England	2024 WXV 1
38	27 September 2025	Twickenham Stadium, London	33 – 13	England	2025 Rugby World Cup final
39	19 September 2026	Sandy Park, Exeter	26 – 26	draw	2026 WXV Global Series
40	16 October 2026	BMO Field, Toronto	24 – 21	Canada	2026 WXV Global Series
41	23 October 2026	TD Place Stadium, Ottawa	31 – 22	Canada	2026 WXV Global Series
