= History of women's rugby union matches between South Africa and the United States =

South Africa and United States have played 6 games against each other, with the United States winning 5, South Africa winning 1 and a draw between the 0 sides.

Their first match-up was at the 2009 Nations Cup in Canada, with the United States winning (39–0) in their pool game.

== Summary ==
=== Overall ===
Details	Played	Won by South Africa	Won by United States	Drawn	South Africa points	United States points
In South Africa	2	1	1	0	53	47
In the United States	2	0	2	0	31	93
Neutral venue	4	1	3	0	52	128
Overall	8	2	5	0	136	268

=== Record ===
Note: Date shown in brackets indicates when the record was or last set.

Record	South Africa	United States
Longest winning streak	1 (4 July 2026–11 July 2026)	4 (13 August 201–Present)
Largest points for
Home	13 (4 July 2026)	56 (10 August 2013)
Away	N/A	7 (11 July 2026)
Neutral venue	3 (9 August 2011)	39 (16 August 2009)
Largest winning margin
Home	13 (4 July 2026)	56 (10 August 2013)
Away	N/A	N/A
Neutral venue	3 (9 August 2011)	39 (16 August 2009)

== Results ==
No.	Date	Venue	Score	Winner	Competition
1	16 August 2009	Appleby College, Oakville, Canada	0–39	United States	2009 Nations Cup
2	9 August 2011	Oakville, Ontario	23–26	South Africa	2011 Nations Cup
3	13 August 2011	Oakville, Ontario	29–9	United States	2011 Nations Cup
4	7 August 2013	University of Northern Colorado, Colorado, United States	32–22	United States	2013 Nations Cup
5	10 August 2013	University of Northern Colorado, Colorado, United States	61–5	United States	2013 Nations Cup
6	30 March 2024	Trailfinders Sports Ground, Ealing, England	38–17	United States	2024 women's rugby union internationals
7	3 July 2026	Ellis Park Stadium, Johannesburg	34–21	South Africa	2026 women's rugby union internationals
8	10 July 2026	Loftus Versfeld Stadium, Pretoria	19–26	United States	2026 women's rugby union internationals
