= History of women's rugby union matches between Australia and Canada =

Australia and Canada first played against each other on 6 June 2014 in Tauranga, New Zealand. They have met on seven occasions with Canada winning every match.

== Summary ==
=== Overall ===
Details	Played	Won by Australia	Won by Canada	Drawn	Australia points	Canada points
In Australia	2	0	2	0	21	78
In Canada	1	0	1	0	7	45
Neutral venue	6	0	6	0	32	202
Overall	9	0	9	0	60	325

=== Record ===
Note: Date shown in brackets indicates when the record was or last set.

Record	Australia	Canada
Longest winning streak	N/A	9 (16 Jun 2014–Present)
Largest points for
Home	14 (11 May 2024)	45 (14 July 2023)
Away	7 (14 July 2023)	45 (23 May 2025)
Neutral venue	12 (26 August 2017)	46 (13 September 2025)
Largest winning margin
Home	N/A	38 (14 July 2023)
Away	N/A	38 (23 May 2025)
Neutral venue	N/A	41 (13 September 2025)

== Results ==
No.	Date	Venue	Score	Winner	Event
1	16 June 2014	Tauranga, New Zealand	0 – 22	Canada	2014 Women's Rugby World Cup warm-up
2	17 June 2017	Smallbone Park, Rotorua, New Zealand	5 – 45	Canada	2017 Women's International Rugby Series
3	26 August 2017	Billings Park UCD, Dublin, Ireland	12 – 43	Canada	2017 Women's Rugby World Cup
4	18 June 2022	Semenoff Stadium, Whangārei, New Zealand	10 – 22	Canada	2022 Pacific Four Series
5	14 July 2023	TD Place, Ottawa	45 – 7	Canada	2023 Pacific Four Series
6	11 May 2024	Sydney Football Stadium, Sydney	14 – 33	Canada	2024 Pacific Four Series
7	23 May 2025	Lang Park, Brisbane	45 – 7	Canada	2025 Pacific Four Series
8	15 September 2025	Ashton Gate (stadium), Bristol	46 – 5	Canada	2025 Women's Rugby World Cup
9	11 April 2026	Heart Health Park, Sacramento	24 – 0	Canada	2026 Pacific Four Series
