= History of women's rugby union matches between Canada and France =

Canada women and France women played 17 games against each other, with France winning 9 matches. Their first match-up was during the inaugural 1996 Canada Cup in Edmonton, Canada winning 34–3. They have met at five World Cups — three times for the Third Place game (2002, 2006, 2021 editions) and once in the semi-finals in 2014. Their most recent clash was at the inaugural WXV1 in 2023.

== Summary ==
=== Overall ===
Details	Played	Won by Canada	Won by France	Drawn	Canada points	France points
In Canada	4	2	2	0	95	56
In France	8	3	8	0	72	139
Neutral venue	7	4	3	0	118	156
Overall	19	9	10	0	285	351

=== Record ===
Note: Date shown in brackets indicates when the record was or last set.

Record	Canada	France
Longest winning streak	4 (9 Jul 2016–12 Nov 2022)	5 (25 May 2002–18 Nov 2009)
Largest points for
Home	34 (11 September 1996)	29 (11 November 2005)
Away	19 (2 November 2013)	17 (17 September 2006)
Neutral venue	36 (2 July 2019)	41 (25 May 2002)
Largest winning margin
Home	31 (11 September 1996)	29 (11 November 2005)
Away	9 (18 November 2009)	9 (17 September 2006)
Neutral venue	19 (9 July 2016)	36 (12 November 2022)

== Results ==
No.	Date	Venue	Score	Winner	Competition
1	1996 September 11	Edmonton	34–3	Canada	1996 Canada Cup
2	1998 May 9	Amsterdam, Netherlands	9––7	Canada	1998 Women's Rugby World Cup
3	2002 May 25	Barcelona, Spain	41––7	France	2002 Women's Rugby World Cup
4	2005 November 11	Nantes	13––5	France	
5	2005 November 11	Nanterre	29––0	France	
6	2006 September 17	Commonwealth Stadium, Edmonton	8––17	France	2006 Women's Rugby World Cup
7	2009 August 16	Oakville	7––12	France	2009 Nations Cup
8	2009 November 18	Dijon	14––5	Canada	
9	2009 November 18	Stade de France, Saint-Denis	22––0	France	
10	2010 August 28	Surrey Sports Park, Guildford, England	23––8	France	2010 Women's Rugby World Cup
11	2011 November 2	Pontarlier	27––19	France	
12	2013 November 5	Amnéville	6––11	Canada	
13	2014 August 13	Stade Jean-Bouin, Paris	16––18	Canada	2014 Women's Rugby World Cup
14	2016 July 9	Regional Athletic Complex, Salt Lake City, Utah, USA	29––10	Canada	2016 Women's Rugby Super Series
15	2019 July 2	Chula Vista, San Diego, USA	36––19	Canada	2019 Women's Rugby Super Series
16	2022 November 12	Eden Park, Auckland, New Zealand	36––0	France	2021 Women's Rugby World Cup
17	2023 November 4	Mount Smart Stadium, Auckland, New Zealand	29––20	Canada	2023 WXV 1
18	2024 September 29	BC Place, Vancouver	46––24	Canada	2024 WXV 1
19	2026 September 26	Stade Marcel-Deflandre, La Rochelle	21––5	France	2026 WXV
