= Renee Gonzalez =

- Born: 14 July 1998 (age 28)
- Height: 1.67 m (5 ft 6 in)
- Weight: 75 kg (165 lb)

Rugby union career
- Position(s): Wing, Centre
International career
Years	Team	Apps	(Points)
	Canada		(0)
National sevens team
Years	Team		Comps
2021–Present	Canada		

Renee Gonzalez (born 14 July 1998) is a Canadian rugby player. She plays sevens rugby and fifteens for Canada internationally.

== Rugby career ==
=== 2022 ===
Gonzalez competed for Canada's sevens team at the 2022 Commonwealth Games in Birmingham. Her side lost to New Zealand in the bronze medal match to finish in fourth place.

=== 2023 ===
Gonzalez was named in Canada's fifteens squad for their test against the Springbok women and for the Pacific Four Series. She scored a try in Canada's 66–7 thrashing of South Africa in Madrid, Spain.
