= Women's Nations Cup (rugby union) =

International sporting competition

- Sport: Rugby union
- Founded: 2008
- Folded: 2013
- Replaced by: Super Series
- No. of teams: 2008: 3; 2009: 5; 2011-2013: 4
- Country: Canada; England; South Africa; United States
- Last champion: Canada (2013)

The Women's Nations Cup was an international women's rugby union series organised jointly by the RFUW (England), USA Rugby and Rugby Canada. It was played from 2008 to 2013, during the summers, with rotating host locations. Guest teams from France, Wales and South Africa occasionally took part. There were separate tournaments for U20 and senior sides.

The first tournaments took place in July 2008, with the U20 competition at Appleby College, Oakville, Ontario, Canada, followed in August by the senior tournament at Esher, London, England.

It was succeeded in 2015 by the Super Series.

== Winners ==
=== U20 ===
- 2008 - England (in Canada)
- 2009 - England (in England)
- 2011 - England (in USA)
- 2013 - Canada (in England)

=== Senior ===
- 2008 - England (in England)
- 2009 - England (in Canada)
- 2011 - England (in Canada)
- 2013 - Canada (in USA)

== See also ==
- Women's international rugby - includes all women's international match results
- IRB Nations Cup
