= Lucy Jenkins =

NZ international rugby union player

- Born: 30 November 2000 (age 25) Kirwee, Canterbury, New Zealand
- Height: 1.68 m (5 ft 6 in)

Rugby union career
- Position: Loose Forward
Amateur team(s)
| Years | Team | Apps | (Points) |
| 2016– | Christchurch | | (0) |
Provincial / State sides
| Years | Team | Apps | (Points) |
| 2017–2023 | Canterbury | 51 | (45) |
Super Rugby
| Years | Team | Apps | (Points) |
| 2022–Present | Matatū | 12 | (20) |
International career
| Years | Team | Apps | (Points) |
| 2023 | New Zealand | 8 | (15) |

Lucy Jenkins (born 30 November 2000) is a New Zealand rugby union player. She plays for Matatū in the Super Rugby Aupiki competition and for Canterbury in the Farah Palmer Cup.

== Early career ==
Jenkins is from Kirwee and started playing rugby at the age of four. She initially played for her father's club, Kirwee, before playing for West Melton. She studied at the University of Canterbury towards a degree in sports coaching, while working for her father as a wardrobe builder.

== Rugby career ==
Jenkins played club rugby for Christchurch; she joined the club as a 15-year-old when her mother was the physio. She made her Farah Palmer Cup debut for Canterbury in 2017 as a 16-year-old. In 2022, she scored a hat-trick for Christchurch and helped them win their 12th back-to-back title. She competed for Canterbury in the 2022 Farah Palmer Cup season and started in their opening match against Wellington.

Jenkins was named to Matatū's squad for their inaugural season of Super Rugby Aupiki in November 2021. She was named to start in Matatū's first game of the inaugural season as they faced Chiefs Manawa in Hamilton; her side went down 15–17. In the second round, she moved to start at 6 after playing in the openside the previous week.

At the start of the 2023 Super Rugby Aupiki season, Jenkins scored her first try for Matatū in their first-ever win in the competition; they narrowly beat the Blues 33–31 in Dunedin. She scored her second try in her side's 38–46 loss to Chiefs Manawa. She was named to the starting lineup for Matatū's grand final clash with Chiefs Manawa; her side defeated the defending champions to claim their first title. On 17 April 2023, Jenkins was listed among the 34 players who were handed Black Ferns contracts in their buildup ahead of the 2025 Rugby World Cup.

Jenkins was named to the Black Ferns 30-player squad to compete in the Pacific Four Series and O'Reilly Cup. She made her international debut against Canada on 8 July at Ottawa; her side secured an overwhelming 52–21 victory.

In 2025, she was named in the Black Ferns XVs side for the trial match against the Black Ferns on July 5 in Whangārei.
