= Kelsey Teneti =

New Zealand rugby union player

- Born: 12 May 2003 (age 23)
- Height: 1.7 m (5 ft 7 in)
- Weight: 78 kg (172 lb)
- School: Hamilton Girls' High School

Rugby union career
- Position: Centre
Amateur team(s)
Years	Team	Apps	(Points)
	Hamilton Old Boys'		(0)
Provincial / State sides
Years	Team	Apps	(Points)
	Waikato		(0)
International career
Years	Team	Apps	(Points)
2022–	New Zealand	3	(5)
National sevens team
Years	Team		Comps
2022–present	New Zealand		40 apps 56 tries 280 points
Medal record
Representing New Zealand
Women's rugby sevens
Olympic Games
Gold medal – first place	2024 Paris	Team competition

Kelsey Teneti (born 12 May 2003) is a contracted New Zealand rugby sevens and rugby union player. She plays primarily as a centre and represents New Zealand in both the fifteens and sevens formats of the game.

== Early life ==
Teneti was born on 12 May 2003 to Louise (nee Lexmond)and Kelvin Teneti. Her grandfather, Whetu Teneti, played rugby for East Coast in 1971 and 1973, while father played rugby for Poverty Bay in 1985 and 1988. Her mother played hockey for Poverty Bay.

Teneti attended her final two years at Hamilton Girls' High School. She was an age-grade field hockey player, representing Poverty Bay in all grades. From the age of 13, she also represented New Zealand Māori in both the Under-21 and senior women's teams.

In waka ama, she won the New Zealand national sprints J16 singles title and secured national and world titles in her six-man and double-hull events with her Horouta team. She capped this off with a world title in the six-man long-distance race in Australia in 2016.

Teneti was also the national judo champion in 2013 in both the +36 kg and Open Junior Girls categories.

== Rugby career ==
Teneti was introduced to rugby by former New Zealand representative Trish Hina, who started an academy at Lytton High School in Gisborne.

She continued playing rugby while attending Hamilton Girls' High School, during which she played for Waikato in the Farah Palmer Cup in 2020 and 2021.

In 2021, she was named in the Chiefs Manawa squad for their historic match against the Blues at Eden Park in April.

That same year, Teneti received several accolades, including the Waitomo Chiefs Rookie of the Year, Waikato Supporters Club Farah Palmer Cup Back of the Year, and the Waitomo Group Farah Palmer Cup Player of the Year. She was also nominated for the NZRPA Women’s Young Player of the Year award in 2021.

In 2022, Teneti was contracted to the Black Ferns Sevens straight out of high school at the age of 18, and she made her debut at the Dubai round of the HSBC World Rugby Sevens Series in December 2022. She was featured in the 86th edition of the Rugby Almanack as the most promising player of the year.

Teneti was also called up as an injury replacement for the Black Ferns squad during the 2022 Pacific Four Series. She made her international debut on 6 June 2022 against Australia in Tauranga.

In 2023, Teneti was named in the Black Ferns squad for the 2023 Pacific Four Series and the Laurie O'Reilly Cup. In July, she scored a try in the Black Ferns’ 52–21 victory over Canada at the Pacific Four Series in Ottawa.

In May 2025, she helped the Black Ferns 7s win the Sevens World Championship title in Los Angeles. She was named in the Black Ferns XVs side for the trial match against the Black Ferns on 5 July in Whangārei.
