= Jett Hayward =

American rugby union player (born 1997)

- Born: 22 April 1997 (age 29) Santa Clara, California, United States
- Height: 5 ft 8 in (173 cm)
- Weight: 180 lb (82 kg)

Rugby union career
- Position: Hooker
Provincial / State sides
Years	Team	Apps	(Points)
2024–	Tasman Mako	3	(7)
Super Rugby
Years	Team	Apps	(Points)
2025	Matatū	1	(0)
International career
Years	Team	Apps	(Points)
2023	United States	1	(0)

Jett Hayward (born (22 April 1997) is an American rugby union player. She plays for the United States internationally and for Matatū in the Super Rugby Aupiki competition. She has played for Life West Gladiatrix in the WPL. She represented the U.S. at the delayed 2021 Rugby World Cup.

== Early career ==
Hayward is a Program Coordinator & Special Projects Associate at Stanford Impact Labs. She attended Stanford University where she began her rugby; she graduated in 2019 with a bachelor's degree in International Relations.

== Rugby career ==
Hayward was selected in the Eagles squad for the delayed 2021 Rugby World Cup in New Zealand.

In 2023, She was named in the Eagles traveling squad for their test against Spain, and for the 2023 Pacific Four Series. She made her test debut for the Eagles against Spain in Madrid.

She played for Tasman Mako in the Farah Palmer Cup in 2024.

In 2025, Hayward joined New Zealand club, Matatū, in the Super Rugby Aupiki competition. On the 1st of March she made her Super Rugby Aupiki debut from off the bench in their match against Chiefs Manawa.
