= Emma Taylor (rugby union) =

Canadian rugby union player

- Born: 9 July 1992 (age 34) Nova Scotia
- Height: 185 cm (6 ft 1 in)

Rugby union career
- Position: Lock
- Current team: Trailfinders
Senior career
Years	Team	Apps	(Points)
2021–2024	Saracens		(0)
International career
Years	Team	Apps	(Points)
2015–Present	Canada	19	(9)

Emma Gabrielle Taylor (born 9 July 1992) is a Canadian rugby union player. She competes for Canada internationally and for Saracens in the Premiership Women's Rugby competition.

== Family and early years ==
Taylor's paternal grandmother was Mi’kmaq, and her maternal grandparents grew up in West Bay, Cape Breton, part of the We’koqma’q First Nations.

Taylor played for Nova Scotia Keltics under-18, under-20, and senior teams. She graduated from St. Francis Xavier with a Business Degree in 2015 and was also their star forward. She played club rugby for Halifax RFC. She joined Irving Shipbuilding after graduating from St. Francis Xavier. She also completed her master's in project management at Michael Smurfit Graduate Business School in Dublin.

== Rugby career ==
In June 2015, she made her test debut for Canada against the Black Ferns at the Super Series in Alberta. She later moved to Ireland for three years before moving back to Canada in 2019. She scored her first international try against the United States in the 2019 Can-Am Series. In 2021, she signed with the Saracens.

Taylor was part of the Canadian side that defeated the Wallaroos in the Pacific Four Series ahead of the World Cup. She competed for Canada at the delayed 2021 Rugby World Cup in New Zealand. She featured in the Pool games against Japan and Italy. Her last World Cup match was in the third place final against France.

In 2023, She was named in Canada's squad for their test against the Springbok women and for the Pacific Four Series. She was named on the bench for Canada's match against South Africa in Madrid, Spain. In July, she featured in her sides 21–52 loss to the Black Ferns at the Pacific Series in Ottawa.

Taylor returned to Saracens for the 2023–24 Premiership Women's Rugby season.
