= Charli Jacoby =

American rugby union player

- Born: October 9, 1989 (age 37) Carol Stream, Illinois, United States
- Height: 5 ft 11 in (180 cm)
- Weight: 225 lb (102 kg; 16 st 1 lb)

Rugby union career
- Position: Prop
Senior career
| Years | Team | Apps | (Points) |
| 2021–22 | Loughborough Lightning | 20 | (0) |
| 2022 | Exeter Chiefs | | (0) |
Super Rugby
| Years | Team | Apps | (Points) |
| 2024–Present | Queensland Reds | 4 | (5) |
International career
| Years | Team | Apps | (Points) |
| 2019–Present | United States | 37 | (10) |

Charli Jacoby (born October 9, 1989) is an American rugby union player. She plays Prop for the United States internationally and for Exeter Chiefs in the Premier 15s.

== Rugby career ==
Jacoby made her international debut for the United States against England in June 2019. She moved to England in September 2021 to play for Loughborough Lightning and made 20 appearances for them. In November 2021, She was named in the starting line-up in the first match against Canada at the 2021 Pacific Four Series.

Jacoby featured for the USA Falcons against the Wales XV's team in March 2022. Her side made a second-half comeback to win 31–23 in Wales Six Nations warm-up. After the 2021–22 Premier 15s season, she joined Exeter Chiefs and is due to make her debut after the World Cup.

Jacoby came off the bench in the Eagles 52–14 loss to England in a warm-up match before the World Cup. She was selected in the Eagles squad for the delayed 2021 Rugby World Cup in New Zealand.

In 2024 she became the first American to play in Australia's Super Rugby Women's competition when she signed with the Queensland Reds for the 2024 season.

She played in the test against Japan in Los Angeles on April 26, 2025, the Eagles lost the closely contested game 33–39. On July 17, she was named in the Eagles squad for the 2025 Women's Rugby World Cup.
