= Summer Harris-Jones =

- Born: 27 June 1996 (age 30)
- Height: 1.72 m (5 ft 8 in)
- Weight: 76 kg (168 lb)

Rugby union career
- Position: Outside Back
International career
Years	Team	Apps	(Points)
2023	United States	1	(0)

Summer Harris-Jones (born 27 June 1996) is an American rugby union player.

Harris-Jones was named in the Eagles traveling squad for their test against Spain, and for the 2023 Pacific Four Series. She made her Eagles debut against Spain in Madrid.
