= Esther Faiaoga-Tilo =

- Born: 26 September 1994 (age 32)
- Height: 167 cm (5 ft 6 in)

Rugby union career
- Position: Prop
Provincial / State sides
Years	Team	Apps	(Points)
2018–2023	Waikato	34	(20)
Super Rugby
Years	Team	Apps	(Points)
2022	Hurricanes Poua	2	(0)
2023	Blues Women	2	(0)
2025–	Hurricanes Poua		(0)
International career
Years	Team	Apps	(Points)
2023	New Zealand	1	(0)

Esther Faiaoga-Tilo (born 26 September 1994) is a New Zealand rugby union player. She plays for the Blues Women in the Super Rugby Aupiki competition.

== Rugby career ==
Faiaoga-Tilo played for Hurricanes Poua in the inaugural season of Super Rugby Aupiki in 2022. She then moved up north after she was released by Hurricanes Poua to try-out for the Blues. The Blues initially overlooked her, but after encouragement from some of her former teammates she decided to attend an open training session for the Blues where she impressed enough to receive a mid-season callup for 2023.

Faiaoga-Tilo was named in the Black Ferns 30-player squad as an injury cover to compete in the Pacific Four Series and O’Reilly Cup. She started in her international debut against the United States on 14 July 2023, at Ottawa.

On 23 September 2023, she was named in the Black Ferns XV's team to play the Manusina XV's side at the Navigation Homes Stadium in Pukekohe. She scored a try in the match as her side won 38–12.
