= Sabrina Poulin =

Canadian rugby union player

- Born: 3 October 1992 (age 34)
- Height: 1.63 m (5 ft 4 in)
- Weight: 65 kg (143 lb)

Rugby union career
- Position: Wing
International career
Years	Team	Apps	(Points)
	Canada	12	(0)
National sevens team
Years	Team		Comps
- Canada

Sabrina Poulin (born 3 October 1992) is a Canadian rugby union player. She has represented Canada in sevens and fifteens at an international level.

== Rugby career ==
=== 2021–22 ===
Poulin competed for the Canadian sevens team at the 2021 Canada Women's Sevens in Vancouver and Edmonton. In 2022, She was named in Canada's fifteens's team for the delayed 2021 Rugby World Cup in New Zealand.

=== 2023 ===
Poulin was named in Canada's squad for their test against the Springbok women and for the Pacific Four Series. She scored a try in Canada's 66–7 thrashing of South Africa in Madrid, Spain. She started in her sides Pacific Four loss to the Black Ferns, they went down 21–52.
