= Fancy Bermudez =

Canadian rugby union and sevens player

- Born: 27 May 2002 (age 24) Edmonton, Alberta
- Height: 1.62 m (5 ft 4 in)
- Weight: 75 kg (165 lb)

Rugby union career
- Position: Outside Back
International career
| Years | Team | Apps | (Points) |
| 2023– | Canada | 19 | (45) |
National sevens team
| Years | Team | | Comps |
- Canada
Medal record
Women's rugby sevens
Representing Canada
Olympics
| Silver medal – second place | 2024 Paris | Team competition |
Women's rugby union
Representing Canada
World Cup
| Silver medal – second place | 2025 England | Team competition |

Fancy Bermudez Chavez (born 27 May 2002) is a Canadian rugby union player. She competed for the Canadian sevens team at the 2022 Rugby World Cup Sevens, and made her international debut for the fifteens team in 2023. She won a silver medal at the 2024 Summer Olympics.

== Rugby career ==
Bermudez was named in Canada's sevens squad and competed at the 2022 Commonwealth Games in Birmingham. Her side lost to New Zealand in the bronze medal match to finish in fourth place.

Bermudez also competed for Canada at the 2022 Rugby World Cup Sevens in Cape Town. They placed sixth overall after losing to Fiji in the fifth place final.

She was named in Canada's squad for their test against the Springbok women and for the Pacific Four Series. She made her test debut for Canada against South Africa in Madrid, Spain; she scored a hat-trick in her sides 66–7 victory. She started in her sides Pacific Four loss to the Black Ferns, they went down 21–52.

She was chosen for the 2024 Summer Olympics in Paris, France. The team won a silver medal, coming from 0–12 behind to defeat Australia 21–12 in the semi-finals, before losing the final to New Zealand.

Bermudez was selected in Canada's squad for the 2025 Pacific Four Series. In July, she made the selection into Canada's Rugby World Cup squad.
