= Maya Learned =

US international rugby union player

- Born: January 1, 1996 (age 30)
- Height: 5 ft 11 in (180 cm)
- Weight: 195 lb (88 kg)

Rugby union career
- Position: Prop
Senior career
Years	Team	Apps	(Points)
2021–2023	Gloucester-Hartpury	11	(1)
2025–	Denver Onyx	1	(1)
International career
Years	Team	Apps	(Points)
2019–Present	United States	20	(0)

Maya Learned (born January 1, 1996) is an American rugby union player. She plays at Prop for the United States internationally and recently joined Denver Onyx for the inaugural season of Women's Elite Rugby. She previously played for Gloucester-Hartpury in the Premier 15s.

== Rugby career ==
Learned was a High School and Junior All-American, she later played for Harvard University. She is proficient on both sides of the scrum and has also played Lock for the Glendale Merlins.

She made her international debut for the United States against Canada in November 2019. She signed with Gloucester-Hartpury in 2021. She later extended her contract to the 2022–2023 Premier 15s season.

In June 2022, she was named in the Eagles squad for the Pacific Four Series in New Zealand. She came off the bench and featured in all three matches against Canada, Australia, and New Zealand. She was selected in the Eagles squad for the delayed 2021 Rugby World Cup in New Zealand.

Learned was named in the Eagles traveling squad for their test against Spain, and for the 2023 Pacific Four Series. She was named on the bench in the Eagles 20–14 win against Spain.

In 2025, she joined the Denver Onyx squad for the inaugural season of the Women's Elite Rugby competition. She played in the test against Japan in Los Angeles on April 26, the Eagles lost the closely contested game 33–39. On July 17, she was named in the Eagles squad for the 2025 Women's Rugby World Cup.
