= Sarah-Maude Lachance =

Canadian rugby union player (born 1988)

- Born: 7 December 1998 (age 27) Victoriaville, Quebec
- Height: 1.78 m (5 ft 10 in)
- Weight: 68 kg (150 lb)

Rugby union career
- Position: Fly-half
- Current team: Stade Bordelais
Senior career
Years	Team	Apps	(Points)
2020-2023	Section Paloise	23	(55)
2023-	Stade Bordelais	11	(35)
International career
Years	Team	Apps	(Points)
2021–Present	Canada	12	(25)
Medal record
Women's rugby union
Representing Canada
World Cup
Silver medal – second place	2025 England	Team competition

Sarah-Maude Lachance (born 7 December 1998) is a Canadian rugby union player. She plays at Fly-half for Canada and for Stade Bordelais.

== Rugby career ==
Lachance began her career with the Vulkins of Cégep of Victoriaville, before joining Université Laval's Rouge et Or in 2019, where she studied physiotherapy. In 2020, she joined Lons Section Paloise.

Lachance was named in the Canadian squad for the inaugural 2021 Pacific Four Series against the United States.

In 2022, she competed for Canada at the delayed 2021 Rugby World Cup in New Zealand.

Lachance was named in Canada's squad for their test against the Springbok women and for the 2023 Pacific Four Series. She scored two tries in Canada's 66–7 thrashing of South Africa in Madrid, Spain.

In 2023, she joined Stade Bordelais and won the Elite 1 championship in June 2024.

She was selected in the Canadian side for the 2025 Pacific Four Series. In July 2025, she made the selection into Canada's Rugby World Cup squad.

== Personal life ==
Her partner is Carla Arbez, who is also a rugby player.
