= Olivia Ortiz (rugby union) =

US international rugby union player

- Born: October 23, 1997 (age 29) Grand Haven, Michigan
- Height: 4 ft 11 in (150 cm)
- Weight: 135 lb (61 kg)

Rugby union career
- Position: Scrumhalf
Senior career
Years	Team	Apps	(Points)
	Colorado Gray Wolves		(0)
2023–2024	Exeter Chiefs		(0)
2024–	Sale Sharks Women		(0)
International career
Years	Team	Apps	(Points)
2019–	United States	30	(10)

Olivia Ortiz (born October 23, 1997) is an American rugby union player. She is a scrumhalf for Sale Sharks Women in the Premiership Women's Rugby competition and the US Eagles internationally.

== Rugby career ==
Ortiz made her international debut for the United States against England in June 2019.

In 2022, Ortiz was named in the starting line-up in the warm-up match against Scotland, which the Eagles won in a closely contested match. She also started in the game against England in Exeter, the Red Roses heavily defeated the Eagles 52–14 ahead of the World Cup.

Ortiz was selected in the Eagles squad for the delayed 2021 Rugby World Cup in New Zealand.

In 2023, She was named in the Eagles traveling squad for their test against Spain, and for the 2023 Pacific Four Series. She was in the starting line-up when her side beat Spain 20–14. She joined Exeter Chiefs for the 2023–24 Premiership Women's Rugby season.

She started in the Eagles 33–39 loss to Japan in Los Angeles on April 26, 2025. On July 17, she was selected for the Eagles side to the 2025 Women's Rugby World Cup that will be held in England.
