= Carly Waters =

US international rugby union player

- Born: December 19, 1995 (age 30) Downingtown, Pennsylvania, United States
- Height: 5 ft 2 in (157 cm)
- Weight: 145 lb (66 kg)

Rugby union career
- Position: Scrumhalf
Senior career
Years	Team	Apps	(Points)
2021–2022	Saracens	16	(0)
2022–	Sale Sharks	0	(0)
2025–	Denver Onyx	1	(0)
International career
Years	Team	Apps	(Points)
2018–Present	United States	23	(0)

Carly Waters (born December 19, 1995) is an American rugby union player. She is a Scrumhalf for the United States and for Sale Sharks in the Premier 15s. She competed for the Eagles at the 2021 Rugby World Cup.

== Rugby career ==
Waters began playing rugby in 2010 in High School as a full-back and went on to win three national titles for Penn State. She previously played for the Colorado Gray Wolves in the Women's Premier League in the U.S before signing with Saracens in the Premier 15s in England for the 2021–22 season. She was one of 43 players who took part in the Eagles three-week training camp in mid-June 2021.

Waters made her international debut for the United States against New Zealand at Chicago in November 2018.

She was selected in the Eagles squad for the 2021 Rugby World Cup in New Zealand. After the World Cup she will be joining Sale Sharks for the 2022–23 Premier 15s season.

In 2023, She was named in the Eagles traveling squad for their test against Spain, and for the 2023 Pacific Four Series. She was named on the bench in the Eagles 20–14 win against Spain.

In 2025, she joined Denver Onyx for the inaugural season of the U.S. based Women's Elite Rugby competition.
