= 2023 Pacific Four Series =

2023 rugby union competition

Tournament details
- Hosts: Spain; Australia; Canada
- Date: 1 April–14 July 2023
- Countries: Australia; Canada; New Zealand; United States

Final positions
- Champions: New Zealand (2nd title)
- Runner-up: Canada
- Laurie O'Reilly Cup: New Zealand

Tournament statistics
- Matches played: 6
- Tries scored: 57 (9.5 per match)
- Top scorer(s): (Canada) Sophie de Goede (41)
- Most tries: (Canada) Tyson Beukeboom (4) (New Zealand) Mererangi Paul (4)

The 2023 Pacific Four Series was the third edition of the Pacific Four Series, an international women's rugby union tournament that served as one of the principal qualification routes for the top two tiers of WXV. The tournament was hosted by Spain, Australia and Canada.

The series took place over three months. The first round saw Canada and the United States play the opening match in Madrid on 1 April 2023, followed by Australia hosting New Zealand on 29 June 2023 in Brisbane. The series concluded in Canada with all four teams competing over two weekends in early July for the title.

New Zealand retained their Pacific Four Series title after a comeback victory over the United States in Ottawa.

== Participants ==
Nation	Head coach	Captain
Australia	(Australia) Jay Tregonning	Michaela Leonard
Canada	(France) Kevin Rouet	Sophie de Goede
New Zealand	(New Zealand) Allan Bunting	Kennedy Simon Ruahei Demant
United States	(United States) Rich Ashfield (Interim)	Kate Zackary

== Format ==
Six matches were played over three months in a round-robin format.

== Table ==
Pos	Team	Pld	W	D	L	PF	PA	PD	TF	TA	TB	LB	Pts
1	New Zealand	3	3	0	0	141	38	+103	22	5	3	0	15
2	Canada	3	2	0	1	116	76	+40	18	11	2	0	10
3	Australia	3	1	0	2	65	112	−47	10	18	1	0	5
4	United States	3	0	0	3	51	147	−96	7	23	0	0	0

== Fixtures ==
=== Round 1 ===
1 April 2023
17:00 CEST (UTC+2)

(1 BP) Canada	50–17	United States
Try: Tuttosi 9' c Poulin (2) 23' c, 36' m Bermudez 40' c Lachance 49' c Beukeboom 59' c Taylor 69' m Boag 76' m Con: de Goede (5/8) 11', 24', 40' +1, 50', 60'	Report	Try: Rogers 54' c Clapp 66' c Con: Cantorna (1/1) 54'; Hawkins (1/1) 67'; Pen: Cantorna (1/1) 39'

Estadio Nacional Complutense, Madrid
Referee: Amber McLachlan (Australia)

FB	15	Sabrina Poulin
RW	14	Sarah-Maude Lachance
OC	13	Fancy Bermudez
IC	12	Sara Kaljuvee (substituted off) 74'
LW	11	Paige Farries
FH	10	Alex Tessier (substituted off) 61'
SH	9	Justine Pelletier (substituted off) 63'
N8	8	Sophie de Goede (c)
OF	7	Sara Svoboda (yellow card) 54' to 67'
BF	6	Fabiola Forteza (yellow card) 72' to end'
RL	5	Courtney Holtkamp (substituted off) 56'
LL	4	Tyson Beukeboom (substituted off) 76'
TP	3	DaLeaka Menin (substituted off) 68'
HK	2	Emily Tuttosi (substituted off) 69'
LP	1	Brittany Kassil (substituted off) 45'
Replacements:
HK	16	Gillian Boag (substituted on) 69'
PR	17	Maya Montiel (substituted on) 45'
PR	18	Alex Ellis (substituted on) 68'
LK	19	Emma Taylor (substituted on) 76'
FL	20	Marie-Pier Fauteux (substituted on) 56'
FL	21	Pamphinette Buisa (substituted on) 63'
CE	22	Mahalia Robinson (substituted on) 74'
FB	23	Julia Schell (substituted on) 61'
Coach:
(France) Kévin Rouet

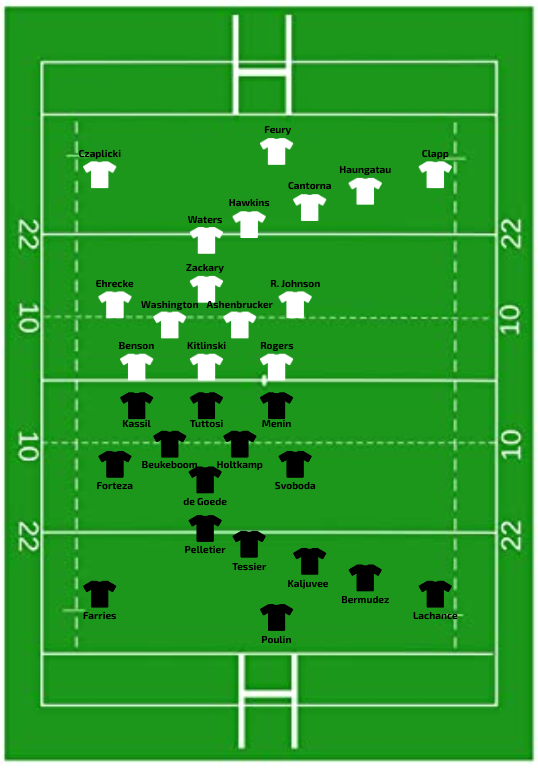

FB	15	Tess Feury
RW	14	Autumn Czaplicki (yellow card) 75' to end'
OC	13	Eti Haungatau	(substituted off) 72'
IC	12	Gabby Cantorna	(substituted off) 58'
LW	11	Lotte Clapp
FH	10	McKenzie Hawkins
SH	9	Carly Waters	(substituted off) 62'
N8	8	Kate Zackary (c) (yellow card) 74' to end'
OF	7	Rachel Johnson
BF	6	Rachel Ehrecke	(substituted off) 57'
RL	5	Alycia Washington	(substituted off) 68'
LL	4	Evelyn Ashenbrucker
TP	3	Catherine Benson	(substituted off) 72'
HK	2	Joanna Kitlinski	(substituted off) 57'
LP	1	Hope Rogers	(substituted off) 62'
Replacements:
HK	16	Jett Hayward	(substituted on) 57'
PR	17	Maya Learned	(substituted on) 62'
PR	18	Tiara A'au	(substituted on) 72'
LK	19	Megan Neyen	(substituted on) 68'
FL	20	Georgie Perris-Redding	(substituted on) 57'
SH	21	Olivia Ortiz	(substituted on) 62'
CE	22	Kristin Bitter	(substituted on) 58'
FB	23	Bulou Mataitoga	(substituted on) 72'
Coach:
(United States) Richard Ashfield

Player of the Match:
Sophie de Goede (Canada)

Assistant referees:
Aurélie Groizeleau (France)
Maria Martinez (Spain)
Television match official:
Stefano Rosini (Italy)

Notes:

- Tiara A'au made her test debut for the Eagles.

29 June 2023
19:00 AEST (UTC+10)

Australia	0–50	New Zealand (1 BP)
	Report	Try: Kalounivale 12' c Brunt (2) 24' c, 34' c Paul (2) 38' m, 42' m C. Bremner 55' c A. Bremner 75' c Hohaia 80' +1 m Con: Holmes (4/6) 13', 25', 35', 56'; Willison (1/2) 75'

Kayo Stadium, Redcliffe
Attendance: 7,055
Referee: Aimee Barrett-Theron (South Africa)

FB	15	Faitala Moleka
RW	14	Maya Stewart	(substituted off) 59'
OC	13	Georgina Friedrichs
IC	12	Cecilia Smith
LW	11	Ivania Wong
FH	10	Carys Dallinger	(substituted off) 48'
SH	9	Layne Morgan	(substituted off) 67'
N8	8	Grace Hamilton
OF	7	Ashley Marsters
BF	6	Kaitlan Leaney	(substituted off) 51'
RL	5	Annabelle Codey	(substituted off) 52'
LL	4	Michaela Leonard (c)
TP	3	Eva Karpani	(substituted off) 56'
HK	2	Tania Naden	(substituted off) 72'
LP	1	Bree-Anna Cheatham	(substituted off) 51'
Replacements:
HK	16	Madison Schuck	(substituted on) 72'
PR	17	Emily Robinson	(substituted on) 51'
PR	18	Bridie O'Gorman	(substituted on) 56'
LK	19	Sera Naiqama	(substituted on) 52'
N8	20	Emily Chancellor	(substituted on) 51'
SH	21	Jasmin Huriwai	(substituted on) 67'
CE	22	Arabella McKenzie	(substituted on) 48'
FB	23	Alana Elisaia	(substituted on) 59'
Coach:
(Australia) Jay Tregonning

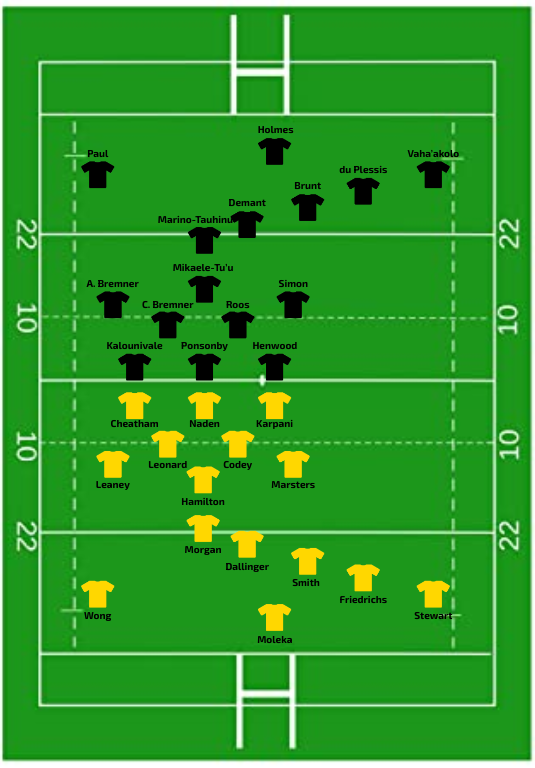

FB	15	Renee Holmes	(substituted off) 60'
RW	14	Mererangi Paul
OC	13	Amy du Plessis
IC	12	Sylvia Brunt	(substituted off) 51'
LW	11	Katelyn Vaha'akolo
FH	10	Ruahei Demant (cc)
SH	9	Arihiana Marino-Tauhinu	(substituted off) 51'
N8	8	Liana Mikaele-Tu'u
OF	7	Kennedy Simon (cc)	(substituted off) 65'
BF	6	Alana Bremner
RL	5	Chelsea Bremner	(substituted off) 56'
LL	4	Maia Roos
TP	3	Tanya Kalounivale	(substituted off) 45'
HK	2	Georgia Ponsonby	(substituted off) 45'
LP	1	Kate Henwood	(substituted off) 45'
Replacements:
HK	16	Luka Connor	(substituted on) 45'
PR	17	Krystal Murray	(substituted on) 45'
PR	18	Amy Rule	(substituted on) 45'
LK	19	Joanah Ngan-Woo	(substituted on) 56'
N8	20	Kendra Reynolds	(substituted on) 65'
SH	21	Iritana Hohaia	(substituted on) 51'
CE	22	Rosie Kelly	(substituted on) 51'
FB	23	Tenika Willison	(substituted on) 60'
Coach:
(New Zealand) Allan Bunting

Player of the Match:
Sylvia Brunt (New Zealand)

Assistant referees:
Amber McLachlan (Australia)
Natarsha Ganley (New Zealand)
Television match official:
Cholm Johnson (Australia)

Notes:

- Rosie Kelly, Tenika Willison, Kate Henwood, Mererangi Paul, Iritana Hohaia and Katelyn Vaha’akolo (all New Zealand) made their international debuts.

=== Round 2 ===
8 July 2023
16:00 EDT (UTC-4)

(1 BP) Australia	58–17	United States
Try: Hamilton 15' c Karpani (2) 21' m, 35' c Talakai 39' m Stewart (3) 47' c, 58' m, 77' c Wong 55' c Friedrichs 62' m Con: Smith (4/6) 16', 36', 49', 56'; Lori Cramer (0/2); McKenzie (1/1) 78'; Pen: Smith (1/1) 40' +2	Report	Try: Ashenbrucker 31' m Detiveaux (2) 50' c, 72' m Con: Hawkins (1/3) 51'

TD Place Stadium, Ottawa
Referee: Julianne Zussman (Canada)

FB	15	Lori Cramer	(substituted off) 65'
RW	14	Maya Stewart
OC	13	Georgina Friedrichs
IC	12	Cecilia Smith	(substituted off) 59'
LW	11	Ivania Wong	(substituted off) 69'
FH	10	Arabella McKenzie
SH	9	Layne Morgan
N8	8	Grace Hamilton	(substituted off) 61'
OF	7	Emily Chancellor
BF	6	Ashley Marsters	(substituted off) 52'
RL	5	Kaitlan Leaney
LL	4	Michaela Leonard (c)
TP	3	Eva Karpani	(substituted off) 52'
HK	2	Adiana Talakai	(substituted off) 49'
LP	1	Bree-Anna Cheatham	(substituted off) 52'
Replacements:
HK	16	Tania Naden	(substituted on) 49'
PR	17	Emily Robinson	(substituted on) 52'
PR	18	Bridie O’Gorman	(substituted on) 52'
LK	19	Sera Naiqama	(substituted on) 52'
N8	20	Tabua Tuinakauvadra	(substituted on) 61'
SH	21	Jasmin Huriwai	(substituted on) 65'
CE	22	Trilleen Pomare	(substituted on) 59'
FB	23	Alana Elisaia	(substituted on) 69'
Coach:
(Australia) Jay Tregonning

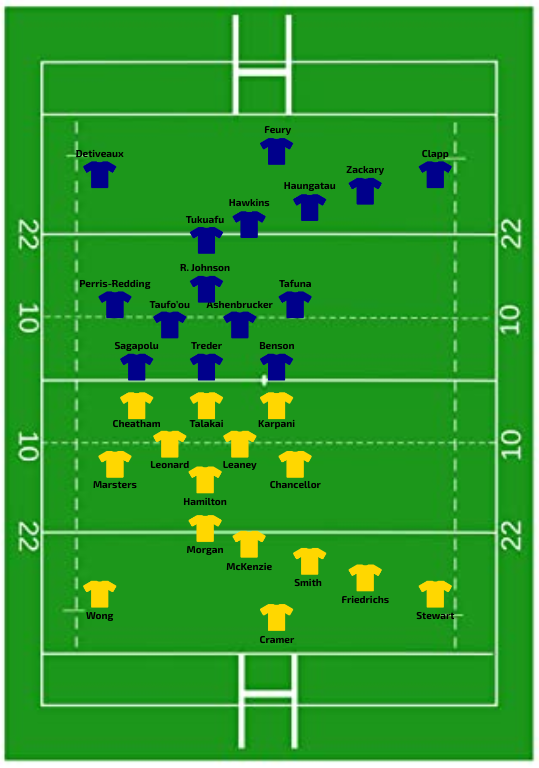

FB	15	Tess Feury
RW	14	Jennine Detiveaux
OC	13	Kate Zackary (c)
IC	12	Eti Haungatau	(substituted off) 53'
LW	11	Lotte Clapp
FH	10	McKenzie Hawkins	(substituted off) 74'
SH	9	Taina Tukuafu	(substituted off) 52'
N8	8	Rachel Johnson
OF	7	Georgie Perris-Redding
BF	6	Paluvava'u Freda Tafuna	(substituted off) 65'
RL	5	Hallie Taufo'ou	(substituted off) 63'
LL	4	Evelyn Ashenbrucker
TP	3	Keia Mae Sagapolu	(substituted off) 54'
HK	2	Kathryn Treder	(substituted off) 61'
LP	1	Catherine Benson	(substituted off) 61'
Replacements:
HK	16	Jett Hayward	(substituted on) 61'
PR	17	Charli Jacoby	(substituted on) 54'
PR	18	Mona Tupou	(substituted on) 61'
LK	19	Rachel Ehrecke	(substituted on) 63'
N8	20	Tahlia Brody	(substituted on) 65'
SH	21	Carly Waters	(substituted on) 52'
CE	22	Joanne Fa'avesi	(substituted on) 53'
FB	23	Meya Bizer	(substituted on) 74'
Interim Coach:
(United States) Richard Ashfield

Player of the Match:
Eva Karpani (Australia)

Assistant referees:
Shanda Assmus (Canada)
Kristine Lovatt (Canada)
Television match official:
Andrew Hosie (Canada)

Notes:

- Paluvava'u Freda Tafuna, Taina Tukuafu and Mona Tupou (all United States) made their international debuts.

8 July 2023
19:00 EDT (UTC-4)

Canada	21–52	New Zealand (1 BP)
Try: de Goede 33' c Forteza 38' c DeMerchant 53' c Con: de Goede (3/3) 35', 39', 54'	Report	Try: Connor 2' c Demant 14' c Paul (2) 19' c, 57' m du Plessis (2) 45' c, 74' c Holmes 62' c Teneti 79' m Con: Holmes (6/8) 3', 15', 19', 46', 63', 75'; Pen: Holmes (0/1)

TD Place Stadium, Ottawa
Attendance: 10,092
Referee: Sara Cox (England)

FB	15	Sabrina Poulin
RW	14	Florence Symonds
OC	13	Fancy Bermudez
IC	12	Sara Kaljuvee		(substituted off) 64'
LW	11	Paige Farries
FH	10	Julia Schell		(substituted off) 52'
SH	9	Justine Pelletier		(substituted off) 71'
N8	8	Sophie de Goede (c)	(yellow card) 77' to end'
OF	7	Fabiola Forteza
BF	6	Gabby Senft		(substituted off) 49'
RL	5	Courtney Holtkamp
LL	4	Tyson Beukeboom		(substituted off) 67'
TP	3	DaLeaka Menin		(substituted off) 60'
HK	2	Emily Tuttosi		(substituted off) 71'
LP	1	Olivia DeMerchant		(substituted off) 65'
Replacements:
HK	16	Gillian Boag		(substituted on) 71'
PR	17	McKinley Hunt		(substituted on) 65'
PR	18	Alex Ellis		(substituted on) 60'
LK	19	Emma Taylor		(substituted on) 67'
N8	20	Sara Svoboda		(substituted on) 49'
SH	21	Olivia Apps		(substituted on) 71'
FH	22	Claire Gallagher		(substituted on) 52'
FB	23	Shoshanah Seumanutafa		(substituted on) 64'
Coach:
(France) Kévin Rouet

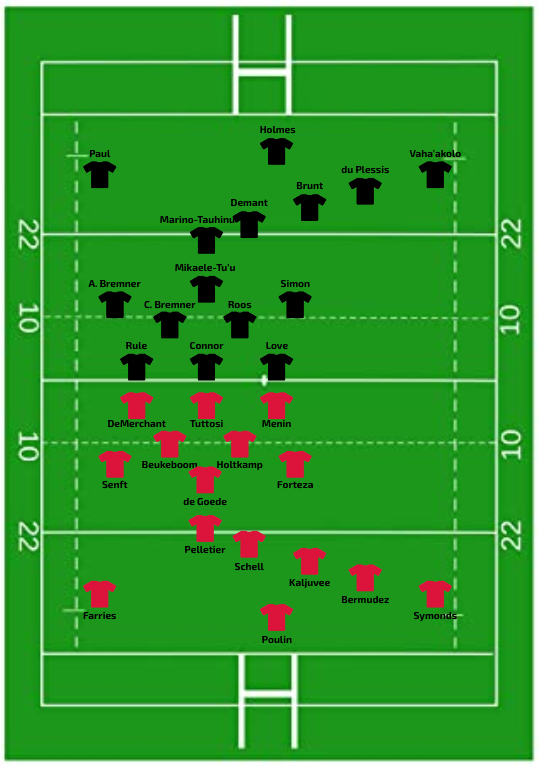

FB	15	Renee Holmes
RW	14	Mererangi Paul
OC	13	Amy du Plessis
IC	12	Sylvia Brunt	(substituted off) 71'
LW	11	Katelyn Vaha'akolo	(substituted off) 51'
FH	10	Ruahei Demant (cc)
SH	9	Arihiana Marino-Tauhinu	(substituted off) 56'
N8	8	Liana Mikaele-Tu'u	(substituted off) 65'
OF	7	Kennedy Simon (cc)
BF	6	Alana Bremner	(substituted off) 51'
RL	5	Chelsea Bremner
LL	4	Maiakawanakaulani Roos
TP	3	Amy Rule	(substituted off) 46'
HK	2	Luka Connor	(substituted off) 37'
LP	1	Philippa Love	(substituted off) 46'
Replacements:
HK	16	Georgia Ponsonby	(substituted on) 37'
PR	17	Kate Henwood	(substituted on) 46'
PR	18	Tanya Kalounivale	(substituted on) 46'
LK	19	Lucy Jenkins	(substituted on) 51'
N8	20	Kendra Reynolds	(substituted on) 65'
SH	21	Iritana Hohaia	(substituted on) 56'
FH	22	Rosie Kelly	(substituted on) 71'
FB	23	Kelsey Teneti	(substituted on) 51'
Coach:
(New Zealand) Allan Bunting

Player of the Match:
Amy du Plessis (New Zealand)

Assistant referees:
Amelia Luciano (United States)
Jenny Lui (United States)
Television match official:
Andrew McMenemy (Scotland)

Notes:

- Florence Symonds, Olivia Apps, Claire Gallagher (all Canada) and Lucy Jenkins (New Zealand) made their international debuts.

=== Round 3 ===
14 July 2023
16:00 EDT (UTC-4)

(1 BP) New Zealand	39–17	United States
Try: Gago 8' m Marino-Tauhinu 47' c Love 58' c Mikaele-Tu'u 67' c Demant 73' m du Plessis 80' m Con: Rosie Kelly (0/1); Holmes (3/5) 48', 59', 68'; Pen: Holmes (1/1) 50'	Report	Try: Tafuna 3' c Johnson 24' c Con: Hawkins (2/2) 4', 25'; Pen: Hawkins (1/1) 40'

TD Place Stadium, Ottawa
Attendance: 1,000
Referee: Julianne Zussman (Canada)

FB	15	Tenika Willison		(substituted off) 40'
RW	14	Kelsey Teneti
OC	13	Amy du Plessis
IC	12	Grace Brooker
LW	11	Grace Steinmetz		(substituted off) 40'
FH	10	Rosie Kelly
SH	9	Iritana Hohaia	(red card) 3'
N8	8	Liana Mikaele-Tu'u	(yellow card) 39' to 49'
OF	7	Kendra Reynolds		(substituted off) 49'
BF	6	Lucy Jenkins
RL	5	Maiakawanakaulani Roos (c)
LL	4	Joanah Ngan-Woo		(substituted off) 40'
TP	3	Amy Rule		(substituted off) 45'
HK	2	Grace Gago		(substituted off) 40'
LP	1	Esther Faiaoga-Tilo		(substituted off) 45'
Replacements:
HK	16	Georgia Ponsonby		(substituted on) 40'
PR	17	Phillipa Love		(substituted on) 45'
PR	18	Tanya Kalounivale		(substituted on) 45'
LK	19	Chelsea Bremner		(substituted on) 40'
N8	20	Kennedy Simon		(substituted on) 49'
SH	21	Arihiana Marino-Tauhinu		(substituted on) 40'
FH	22	Ruahei Demant
FB	23	Renee Holmes		(substituted on) 40'
Coach:
(New Zealand) Allan Bunting

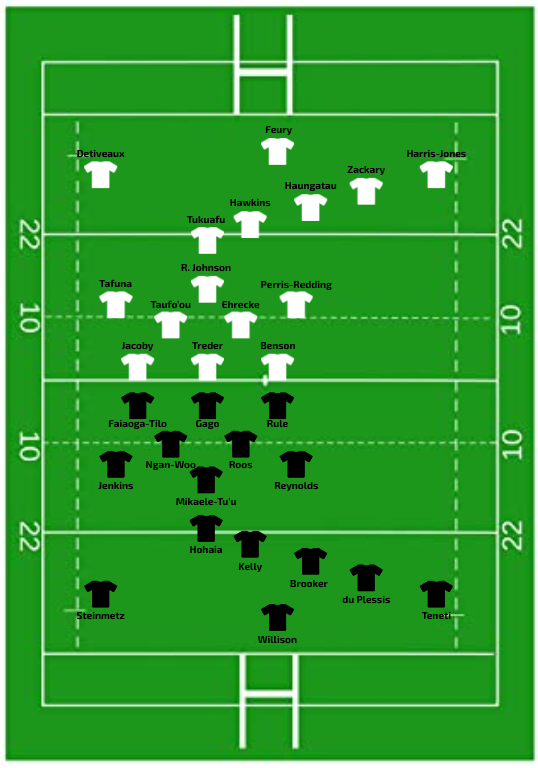

FB	15	Tess Feury
RW	14	Jennine Detiveaux
OC	13	Kate Zackary (c)
IC	12	Eti Haungatau		(substituted off) 52'
LW	11	Summer Harris-Jones		(substituted off) 74'
FH	10	McKenzie Hawkins
SH	9	Taina Tukuafu		(substituted off) 63'
N8	8	Rachel Johnson
OF	7	Georgie Perris-Redding	(yellow card) 7' to 17'	(substituted off) 75'
BF	6	Paluvava'u Freda Tafuna		(substituted off) 57'
RL	5	Hallie Taufo'ou
LL	4	Rachel Ehrecke		(substituted off) 70'
TP	3	Charli Jacoby		(substituted off) 63'
HK	2	Kathryn Treder
LP	1	Catherine Benson		(substituted off) 48'	(substituted on) 60'	(substituted off) 75'
Replacements:
HK	16	Jett Hayward		(substituted on) 75'
PR	17	Mona Tupou		(substituted on) 48'	(substituted off) 60'	(substituted on) 75'
PR	18	Tiara A’au		(substituted on) 63'
LK	19	Evelyn Ashenbrucker		(substituted on) 57'
N8	20	Erica Jarrell		(substituted on) 70'
SH	21	Olivia Ortiz		(substituted on) 63'
CE	22	Joanne Fa'avesi		(substituted on) 52'
FB	23	Meya Bizer		(substituted on) 74'
Coach:
(United States) Richard Ashfield

Player of the Match:
Ruahei Demant (New Zealand)

Assistant referees:
Shanda Assmus (Canada)
Kristine Lovatt (Canada)
Television match official:
Chris Assmus (Canada)

Notes:

- Esther Faiaoga-Tilo, Grace Gago (both New Zealand) and Erica Jarrell (United States) made their international debuts.
- At the age 21, Maiakawanakaulani Roos became the youngest ever player to captain New Zealand.

14 July 2023
19:00 EDT (UTC-4)

Canada	45–7	Australia
Try: de Goede (2) 16' c, 40' c Lachance 29' m Beukeboom (3) 35' c, 51' c, 68' m Gallagher 45' c Con: de Goede (5/7) 17', 36', 40' +1, 46', 52'	Report	Try: Marsters 22' c Con: Cramer (1/1) 23'

TD Place Stadium, Ottawa
Referee: Sara Cox (England)

FB	15	Maddy Grant	(substituted off) 65'
RW	14	Sarah-Maude Lachance
OC	13	Alysha Corrigan	(substituted off) 49'
IC	12	Sara Kaljuvee	(substituted off) 61'
LW	11	Paige Farries
FH	10	Claire Gallagher
SH	9	Justine Pelletier
N8	8	Sophie de Goede (c)
OF	7	Fabiola Forteza
BF	6	Sara Svoboda	(substituted off) 56'
RL	5	Courtney Holtkamp
LL	4	Tyson Beukeboom	(substituted off) 69'
TP	3	DaLeaka Menin	(substituted off) 60'
HK	2	Emily Tuttosi	(substituted off) 60'
LP	1	McKinley Hunt	(substituted off) 65'
Replacements:
HK	16	Mya Brubacher	(substituted on) 65'
PR	17	Sara Cline	(substituted on) 60'
PR	18	Alexandria Ellis	(substituted on) 60'
LK	19	Laetitia Royer	(substituted on) 69'
N8	20	Gabrielle Senft	(substituted on) 56'
SH	21	Olivia Apps	(substituted on) 61'
CE	22	Shoshanah Seumanutafa	(substituted on) 65'
FB	23	Fancy Bermudez	(substituted on) 49'
Coach:
(France) Kévin Rouet

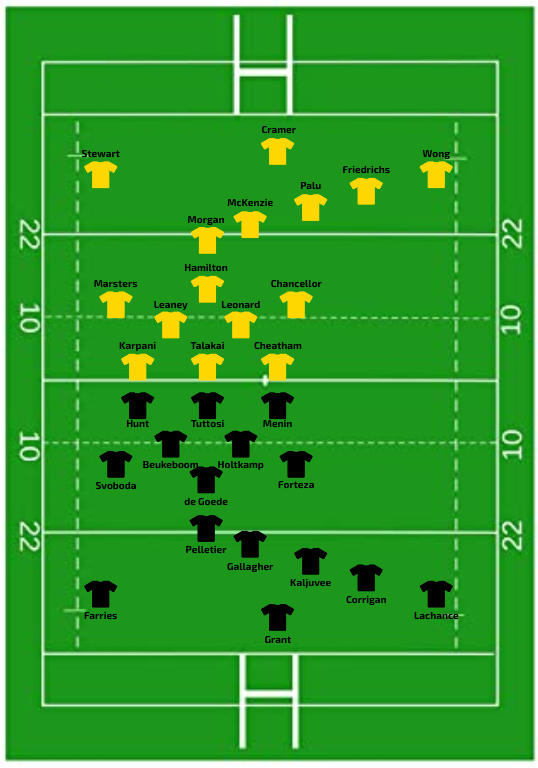

FB	15	Lori Cramer
RW	14	Maya Stewart
OC	13	Georgina Friedrichs
IC	12	Siokapesi Palu	(substituted off) 49'
LW	11	Ivania Wong	(substituted off) 69'
FH	10	Arabella McKenzie
SH	9	Layne Morgan	(substituted off) 65'
N8	8	Grace Hamilton	(substituted off) 60'
OF	7	Emily Chancellor
BF	6	Ashley Marsters	(substituted off) 53' (substituted on) 60'
RL	5	Kaitlan Leaney	(substituted off) 60'
LL	4	Michaela Leonard (c)
TP	3	Eva Karpani	(substituted off) 60'	(yellow card) 50' to 60'
HK	2	Adiana Talakai	(substituted off) 53'
LP	1	Bree-Anna Cheatham	(substituted off) 69'	(yellow card) 57' to 67'
Replacements:
HK	16	Tania Naden	(substituted on) 53'
PR	17	Madison Schuck	(substituted on) 57'
PR	18	Bridie O’Gorman	(substituted on) 53'
LK	19	Sera Naiqama	(substituted on) 60'
N8	20	Tabua Tuinakauvadra	(substituted on) 60'
SH	21	Jasmin Huriwai	(substituted on) 65'
CE	22	Trilleen Pomare	(substituted on) 49'
FB	23	Alana Elisaia	(substituted on) 69'
Coach:
(Australia) Jay Tregonning

Player of the Match:
Tyson Beukeboom (Canada)

Assistant referees:
Amelia Luciano (United States)
Jenny Lui (United States)
Television match official:
Andrew McMenemy (Scotland)

Notes:

- Mya Brubacher, Sara Cline and Shoshanah Seumanutafa (Canada) made their international debuts.

== Player statistics ==
=== Most points ===
Rank	Name	Team	Points
1	Sophie de Goede	Canada	41
2	Renee Holmes	New Zealand	34
3	Tyson Beukeboom	Canada	20
3	Mererangi Paul	New Zealand	20
5	Maya Stewart	Australia	15
6	McKenzie Hawkins	United States	11
6	Cecilia Smith	Australia	11
8	Sylvia Brunt	New Zealand	10
8	Ruahei Demant	New Zealand	10
8	Jennine Detiveaux	United States	10
8	Amy du Plessis	New Zealand	10
8	Eva Karpani	Australia	10
8	Sarah-Maude Lachance	Canada	10
8	Sabrina Poulin	Canada	10

=== Most tries ===
Rank	Name	Team	Tries
1	Tyson Beukeboom	Canada	4
1	Mererangi Paul	New Zealand	4
2	Sophie de Goede	Canada	3
2	Maya Stewart	Australia	3
4	Sylvia Brunt	New Zealand	2
4	Ruahei Demant	New Zealand	2
4	Jennine Detiveaux	United States	2
4	Amy du Plessis	New Zealand	2
4	Eva Karpani	Australia	2
4	Sarah-Maude Lachance	Canada	2
4	Sabrina Poulin	Canada	2

== See also ==
- 2023 Laurie O'Reilly Cup
