= Catherine Benson =

American rugby union player

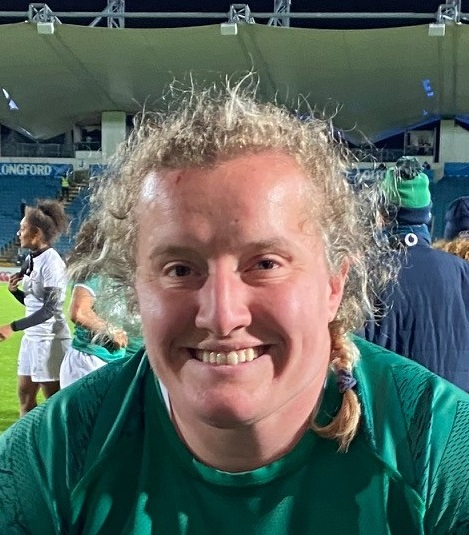
- Benson, after the Eagles match against Ireland in Dublin on December 4, 2021.
- Born: February 10, 1992 (age 34)
- Height: 5 ft 8 in (173 cm)
- Weight: 210 lb (95 kg)
- School: Iroquois High School
- University: Pennsylvania State University

Rugby union career
- Position: Prop
Senior career
| Years | Team | Apps | (Points) |
| 2021–2025 | Sale Sharks | 0 | (0) |
| 2025– | Boston Banshees | 2 | (0) |
International career
| Years | Team | Apps | (Points) |
| 2016– | United States | 47 | (5) |

Catherine Benson (born February 10, 1992) is an American rugby union player. She competed for the United States at the 2017, 2021 and 2025 Women's Rugby World Cups.

== Rugby career ==
Benson debuted for the United States in 2016. She was selected for the squad to the 2017 Women's Rugby World Cup in Ireland. She also played at the 2016 Women's Rugby Super Series in Salt Lake City, Utah.

In 2021, she joined Sale Sharks Women in Premiership Women's Rugby, at the time known as Premier 15s.

She was named in the Eagles squad for the 2022 Pacific Four Series in New Zealand. She was selected in the Eagles squad for the delayed 2021 Rugby World Cup in New Zealand.

Benson made the Eagles traveling squad for their test against Spain, and for the 2023 Pacific Four Series. She was named on the bench in the Eagles 20–14 win against Spain.

On February 18, 2025, she was named in the Boston Banshees squad for the inaugural season of the Women's Elite Rugby competition. On March 5, it was announced she would be leaving Sale Sharks.

On July 17, she was named in the Eagles squad for the 2025 Women's Rugby World Cup.
