= Gabby Cantorna =

American rugby union player

- Born: August 2, 1995 (age 31) Madison, Wisconsin, U.S.
- Height: 5 ft 6 in (168 cm)
- Weight: 172 lb (78 kg; 12 st 4 lb)

Rugby union career
- Position(s): Center, Fly half
Senior career
Years	Team	Apps	(Points)
2020–	Exeter Chiefs	70	(335)
International career
Years	Team	Apps	(Points)
2018–	United States	35	(78)

Gabriella Cantorna (born August 2, 1995) is an American rugby union player. She plays for the United States and for Exeter Chiefs in the Premier 15s. She has competed for the Eagles at the 2021 and 2025 Women's Rugby World Cups.

== Rugby career ==
Cantorna grew up in Pennsylvania and began playing rugby at the age of 14. She went to Pennsylvania State University and won four National College Championships. In 2017 she was awarded the D1 Elite National Championship MVP award.

Cantorna made her international debut for the United States against New Zealand in 2018 during the Eagles Autumn Internationals. In 2020, She signed a one-year contract with the Exeter Chiefs.

Cantorna was named in the Eagles squad for the 2022 Pacific Four Series in New Zealand. She was selected in the Eagles squad for the 2021 Rugby World Cup in New Zealand.

In 2023, She was named in the Eagles traveling squad for their test against Spain, and for the 2023 Pacific Four Series. She successfully kicked five points in her sides 20–14 win over Spain.

On July 17, 2025, she was selected in the Eagles side to the 2025 Women's Rugby World Cup that will be held in England.
