= DaLeaka Menin =

Canada international rugby union player (born 1995)

- Born: 16 June 1995 (age 31) Vulcan, Alberta, Canada
- Height: 1.72 m (5 ft 8 in)
- Weight: 90 kg (198 lb)

Rugby union career
- Position: Prop
- Current team: Exeter Chiefs
Senior career
Years	Team	Apps	(Points)
	Loughborough Lightning		(0)
2021–	Exeter Chiefs	38	(25)
International career
Years	Team	Apps	(Points)
2015–	Canada	69	(55)
- Correct as of 2025-09-27
Medal record
Women's rugby union
Representing Canada
World Cup
Silver medal – second place	2025 England	Team competition

DaLeaka Lilly Menin (born 16 June 1995) is a Canadian rugby union player. She plays at Prop for Canada internationally and for Exeter Chiefs Women in the Premiership Women's Rugby competition.

== Rugby career ==
Menin played for the Calgary Dinos for five years, scoring 23 tries on the team. She has received numerous merits including the U-Sports Rookie of the Year award in the 2013–2014 season and the U-Sports players of the year award in 2016–2017.

She competed for Canada at the 2017 Women's Rugby World Cup in Ireland. Menin made her debut against the New Zealand Black Ferns side in 2015 where the Canadian side lost 40–22. She is primarily known for playing tighthead prop but can also play loosehead prop.

Menin was selected in Canada's squad for the deferred 2021 Rugby World Cup in New Zealand. She started every game at the Rugby World Cup at tighthead prop.

In 2023, she was named in Canada's squad for their test against the Springbok women and for the 2023 Pacific Four Series. She started in Canada's 66–7 thrashing of South Africa in Madrid, Spain. In July 2023, she started in her sides Pacific Four loss to the Black Ferns, they went down 21–52.

She was selected in Canada's squad for the 2025 Pacific Four Series. On 24 July, she was selected in the Canadian side to the Rugby World Cup.
