= Courtney Holtkamp =

Canadian rugby union player

Courtney O'Donnell
- Born: 25 April 1999 (age 27)
- Height: 5 ft 11 in (180 cm)

Rugby union career
- Position: Back row
Senior career
Years	Team	Apps	(Points)
2020–2021	Loughborough Lightning		(0)
International career
Years	Team	Apps	(Points)
2017–Present	Canada	53	(40)
Medal record
Women's rugby union
Representing Canada
World Cup
Silver medal – second place	2025 England	Team competition

Courtney O'Donnell (née Holtkamp; born 25 April 1999) is a Canadian rugby union player. She plays in the Back row for Canada, and competed at the delayed 2021 Rugby World Cup.

== Rugby career ==
O'Donnell debuted internationally for Canada at the age of 18 against England in November 2017 at Allianz Park.

In 2020, She signed with Loughborough Lightning for the Premier 15s 2020–21 season. She plays for the Red Deer Titans and has appeared for the University of Alberta Pandas.

She competed for Canada at the delayed 2021 Rugby World Cup in New Zealand. She played against the Eagles in their quarterfinal encounter. She also started in the semifinal against England, and in the third place final against France.

In 2023, She was named in Canada's squad for their test against the Springbok women and for the Pacific Four Series. She started in Canada's 66–7 thrashing of South Africa in Madrid, Spain. In July 2023, she started in her sides Pacific Four loss to the Black Ferns, they went down 21–52.

O'Donnell was selected in Canada's squad for the 2025 Pacific Four Series. She was named in the Canadian side to the Rugby World Cup in England.
