= 2008 Nations Cup (women's rugby union) =

2008 Women's Nation's Cup
- Countries: Canada; England; United States; Wales
- Champions: England (U20 & Senior)
- Runners-up: Canada (U20 & Senior)
- Matches played: 7

The Nations Cup tournament was played for the first time at Esher RFC, England, in August 2008. An Under-20 version also took place in Canada a month before.

This was the first of what is planned to be a regular tournament involving major Northern Hemisphere women's rugby nations. The first event was originally promoted as including England, USA, Canada, Wales and France - but by the time the match schedule was published only the first three nations had confirmed their participation. The U20 had similar withdrawals, being eventually limited to only Canada, England and Wales.

England dominated both tournaments, only being pushed close by the USA in the opening game of the senior tournament. The USA were unable to maintain this performance against Canada, however, losing their fourth successive international against their North American rivals (their worst run ever) to finish third overall. For Canada, despite the heavy defeat to England, runners-up spot confirmed their position in the top four of women's rugby.

== Under 20 Nations Cup 2008 (Appleby College, Oakville, Canada) ==
=== Final table ===
Pos	Team	Pld	W	D	L	PF	PA	PD	Pts
1	England U20	2	2	0	0	45	8	+37	4
2	Canada U20	2	1	0	1	27	31	−4	2
3	Wales U20	2	0	0	2	3	36	−33	0

==== Points scoring ====
4 points awarded for a win, 2 points for a draw, no points for a loss. 1 bonus point awarded for scoring four or more tries and 1 bonus point for losing by less than 7 points.

=== Results ===
11 July 2008

Canada U20	5–31	England U20

Oakville, Ontario

14 July 2008

Canada U20	22–0	Wales U20

Oakville, Ontario

16 July 2008

England U20	14–3	Wales U20

Oakville, Ontario

=== Final ===
19 July 2008

Canada U20	7–30	England U20

Oakville, Ontario

== Nations Cup 2008 (Esher RFC, England) ==
=== Final table ===
Pos	Team	Pld	W	D	L	PF	PA	PD	Pts
1	England	2	2	0	0	60	23	+37	4
2	Canada	2	1	0	1	24	43	−19	2
3	United States	2	0	0	2	14	32	−18	0

=== Results ===
2008-08-22

England	17–14	United States

Esher, England

2008-08-24

England	43–9	Canada

Esher, England

2008-08-26

Canada	15–0	United States

Esher, England

== See also ==
- Women's international rugby

Preceded by	Nations Cup; 2008; England	Succeeded by Nations Cup 2009
