= Pacific Four Series =

International women's rugby union competition

- Current season, competition or edition: 2026 Pacific Four Series
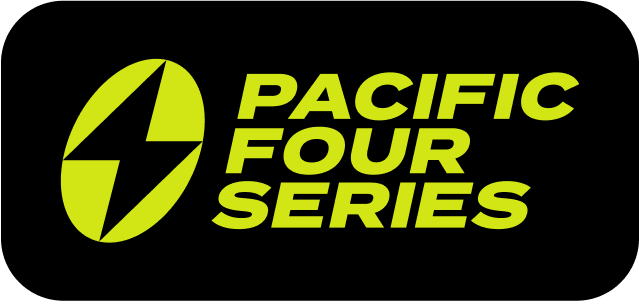
- Sport: Rugby union
- Founded: 2021
- No. of teams: 4
- Country: Australia Canada New Zealand United States New Zealand
- Most recent champion: New Zealand (2026)
- Most titles: New Zealand (4 titles)

The Pacific Four Series is an international rugby union competition that is sanctioned by World Rugby. It is contested between four women's national teams — Australia, Canada, New Zealand, and the United States. It began in 2021 and was initially contested between Canada and the United States. They were later joined by Australia and New Zealand in 2022.

== History ==
The Pacific Four Series was announced as a cross-regional tournament that serve as a qualifier for Oceania Rugby and Rugby Americas North (RAN) to the WXV competition that officially launched in 2023. Australia, Canada, New Zealand and the United States were announced as the competing teams for the tournament.

Australia and New Zealand were unable to join the inaugural competition in 2021 due to the COVID-19 pandemic. However, World Rugby decided to proceed with the soft launch with only Canada and the United States. Canada won the initial tournament after two rounds of play.

New Zealand won the 2022 Pacific Four Series after defeating the United States 50–6 in the final match. New Zealand retained the series title in 2023. In 2024, Canada won their first-ever test against the Black Ferns and claimed their second title.

== Results ==
Year	Host(s)	Winner	Runner-up
2021	United States	Canada	United States
2022	New Zealand	New Zealand	Canada
2023	Various	New Zealand	Canada
2024	Various	Canada	New Zealand
2025	Various	New Zealand	Canada
2026	Various	New Zealand	Canada

=== Team records ===
Team	Winner	Runner-up	3rd	4th
Australia			2 (2023, 2025)	3 (2022, 2024, 2026)
Canada	2 (2021, 2024)	4 (2022, 2023, 2025, 2026)		
New Zealand	4 (2022, 2023, 2025, 2026)	1 (2024)		
United States		1 (2021)	3 (2022, 2024, 2026)	2 (2023, 2025)

== Player statistics ==
As of 2026.

=== Points ===
Rank	Name	Team	Points	Tries	Con.	Pen.	Drop
1	Sophie de Goede	Canada	108	7	32	3	0
2	Renee Holmes	New Zealand	92	4	33	2	0
3	Mererangi Paul	New Zealand	70	14	0	0	0
4	Hope Rogers	United States	60	12	0	0	0
5	Ruahei Demant	New Zealand	50	3	16	1	0

Key: Con = Conversions. Pen = Penalties. Drop = Drop Goals.

=== Tries ===
Rank	Name	Team	Tries
1	Mererangi Paul	New Zealand	14
2	Hope Rogers	United States	12
3	Katelyn Vaha'akolo	New Zealand	8
4	Sylvia Brunt	New Zealand	7
4	Sophie de Goede	Canada	7
4	Portia Woodman-Wickliffe	New Zealand	7

== See also ==
- Women's international rugby - includes all women's international match results
