= Kate Zackary =

American rugby union player

- Full name: Katherine Zackary
- Born: July 26, 1989 (age 37) Garden City, Kansas, U.S.
- Height: 1.72 m (5 ft 8 in)
- Weight: 79 kg (174 lb)

Rugby union career
- Position: Back Row
- Current team: Trailfinders Women
Senior career
Years	Team	Apps	(Points)
2020–2023	Exeter Chiefs		(0)
2023–	Trailfinders		(0)
International career
Years	Team	Apps	(Points)
2016-	United States	49	(40)
National sevens team
Years	Team		Comps
2016-	United States		
Medal record
Women's rugby sevens
Representing United States
Pan American Games
Silver medal – second place	2015 Toronto	Team competition

Katherine Zackary (born July 26, 1989) is an American rugby union and sevens player. She debuted for the United States in 2016 and for the sevens team in 2014. She won a silver medal at the 2015 Pan American Games as a member of the United States women's national rugby sevens team.

== Early career ==
Zackary attended Salina South High School and Benedictine College where she initially played soccer. She attended college on a soccer scholarship and it was there that she saw rugby. She played rugby for the Benedictine Saints.

== Rugby career ==
In 2014 she quit her job working in a gym to train full-time with the women's Eagles sevens team.

Zackary joined Exeter Chiefs Women's team in 2020, but left to join Trailfinders Women in 2023. Trailfinders compete in the Premiership Women's Rugby, the top tier of women's professional rugby in England.

In 2022, she was named in the Eagles squad for the Pacific Four Series in New Zealand. She was named in the Eagles fifteens squad to the 2021 Rugby World Cup in New Zealand.

Zackary was named in the Eagles traveling squad for their test against Spain, and for the 2023 Pacific Four Series. She was in the starting line-up when her side beat Spain 20–14.

She led the Eagles in a closely contested test match against Japan in Los Angeles on April 26, 2025, her side lost 33–39. On July 17, she was selected for the Eagles side to the 2025 Women's Rugby World Cup that will be held in England.
