= Joanne Fa'avesi =

American rugby sevens player

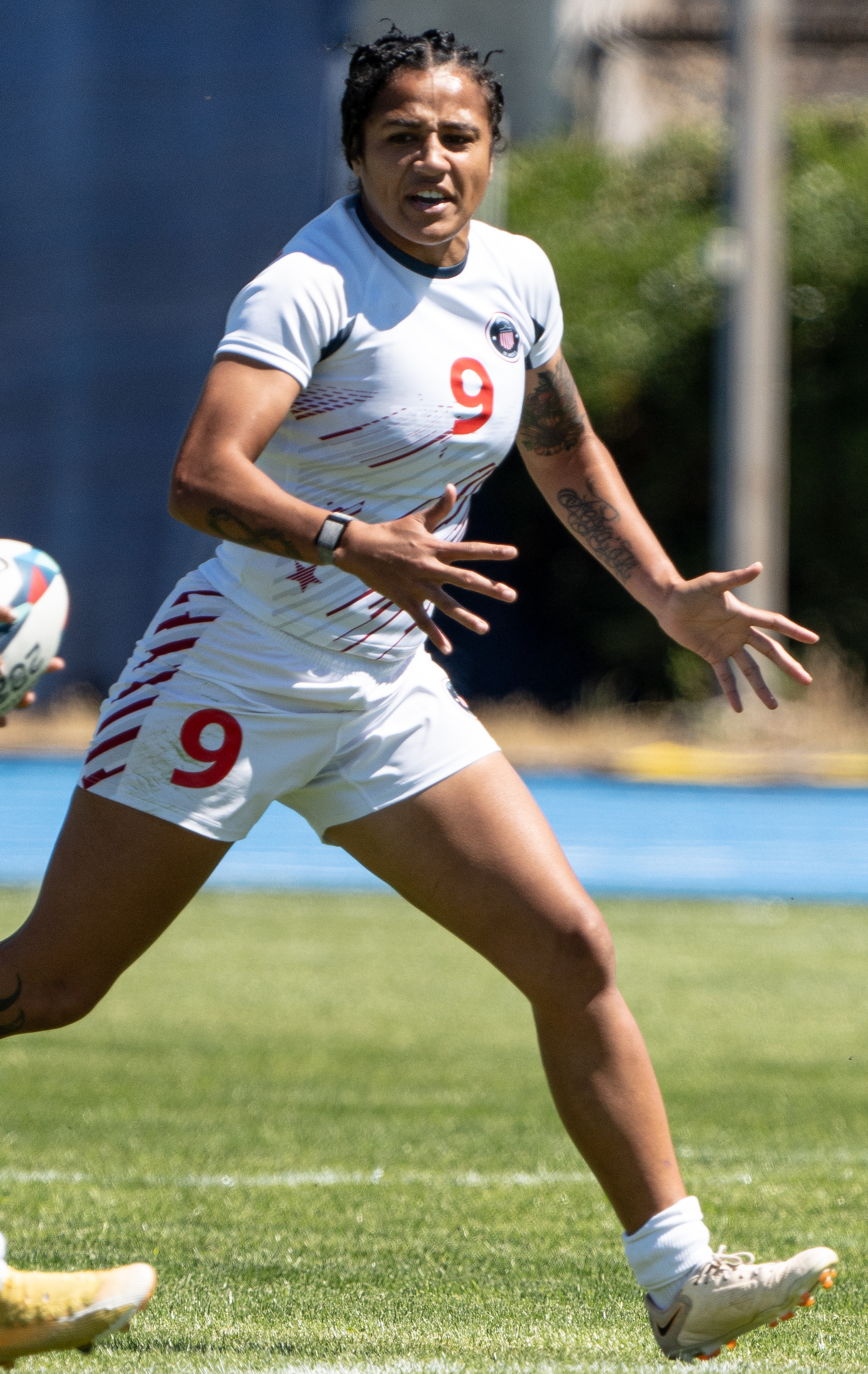
- Fa'avesi at the 2023 Pan American Games
- Born: February 5, 1992 (age 34) Salinas, California, U.S.
- Height: 5 ft 6 in (1.68 m)
- Weight: 155 lb (70 kg)

Rugby union career
- Position(s): Hooker, Prop (7s)
International career
| Years | Team | Apps | (Points) |
| 2016– | United States | 10 | (0) |
National sevens team
| Years | Team | | Comps |
| 2014– | United States | | |
- Military career
- Allegiance: United States
- Branch: United States Army
- Service years: 2017–present
- Rank: Sergeant
Medal record
Women's rugby sevens
Representing United States
Pan American Games
| Gold medal – first place | 2023 Santiago | Team competition |
| Silver medal – second place | 2015 Toronto | Team competition |

Joanne "Nana" Fa'avesi (born February 5, 1992) is an American rugby sevens player. She won a silver medal at the 2015 Pan American Games as a member of the United States women's national rugby sevens team.

== Early life ==
Fa'avesi grew up in Sacramento and is the youngest of seven children. She is of Tongan descent.

== Rugby career ==
Fa’avesi was part of the United States women's sevens team that won a silver medal at the 2015 Pan American Games in Toronto. She went on to compete in the 2016 Summer Olympics.

She featured for the U.S. women's sevens at the 2018 Rugby World Cup Sevens that was held in San Francisco.

She was selected to represent the United States at the 2022 Rugby World Cup Sevens in Cape Town. In 2023, she took home a gold medal after the Eagles women's sevens side won the Pan American Games.

She was named in the Eagles XVs side on July 17 to the 2025 Women's Rugby World Cup.
