= 2013 Nations Cup (women's rugby union) =

2013 Women's Nation's Cup
- Countries: Canada; England; South Africa; United States
- Champions: Canada; Canada (U20)
- Runners-up: England; United States (U20)
- Matches played: 10

The fourth Nations Cup tournament was played at the University of Northern Colorado, USA during July and August 2013 following on from the Under-20s competition which took place at Trent College, Long Eaton, England in early July. The tournaments included teams from the United States, South Africa, England and Canada.

This tournament was succeeded by the Women's Rugby Super Series.

== Nations Cup 2013 (University of Northern Colorado) ==
=== Final table ===
Position	Nation	Games				Points		Bonus points		Table points
Position	Nation	played	won	drawn	lost	for	against	Tries	Losing	Table points
1	Canada	3	2	0	1	99	69	2	0	10
2	England	3	2	0	1	79	67	1	1	10
3	United States	3	2	0	1	82	75	2	0	10
4	South Africa	3	0	0	3	54	103	1	1	2

==== Points scoring ====
4 points awarded for a win, 2 points for a draw, no points for a loss. 1 bonus point awarded for scoring four or more tries and 1 bonus point for losing by less than 7 points.

=== Results ===
30 July 2013

Canada	29–25	England

University of Northern Colorado

30 July 2013

United States	32–22	South Africa

University of Northern Colorado

4 August 2013

England	18–17	South Africa

University of Northern Colorado

4 August 2013

United States	29–17	Canada

University of Northern Colorado

7 August 2013

Canada	53–15	South Africa

University of Northern Colorado

7 August 2013

United States	21–36	England

University of Northern Colorado

Third place

10 August 2013

United States	61–5	South Africa

Infinity Park, Glendale, Colorado

Final

10 August 2013

Canada	27–13	England

Infinity Park, Glendale, Colorado

== Under 20 Nations Cup 2013 (Trent College, Long Eaton) ==
Sara Svoboda, 18, from Belleville, Ontario, Canada, raised money to take the trip to England. Her team U20 from Canada won the Cup.

=== Final table ===
Position	Nation	Games				Points		Table points
Position	Nation	played	won	drawn	lost	for	against	Table points
1	Canada U20	3	3	0	0	103	30	6
2	USA U20	3	2	0	1	86	47	4
3	South Africa U20	3	1	0	2	29	103	2
4	England U20	3	0	0	3	54	112	0

=== Results ===
11 July 2013

England U20	22–24	South Africa U20

Trent College, Long Eaton

11 July 2013

Canada U20	25–15	United States U20

Trent College, Long Eaton

14 July 2013

United States U20	44–5	South Africa U20

Trent College, Long Eaton

14 July 2013

England U20	15–41	Canada U20

Trent College, Long Eaton

17 July 2013

England U20	17–27	United States U20

Trent College, Long Eaton

17 July 2013

Canada U20	37–0	South Africa U20

Trent College, Long Eaton

Third place

20 July 2013

England U20	27–3	South Africa U20

Trent College, Long Eaton

Final

20 July 2013

Canada U20	27–3	United States U20

Trent College, Long Eaton

== See also ==
- Women's international rugby

Preceded by Nations Cup 2011	Nations Cup; 2013; Canada	Succeeded by Super Series 2015
