= 2009 Nations Cup (women's rugby union) =

Rugby Tournament

2009 Women's Nation's Cup
- Countries: Canada; England; France; South Africa; United States; Wales
- Champions: England (U20 & Senior)
- Runners-up: United States (U20 & Senior)
- Matches played: 18

The second Nations Cup tournament was played at Appleby College in Oakville, Ontario, Canada, in August 2009. An Under-20 version also took place in England a month before. The second tournament again included Canada, England and the USA, but these nations were joined by France for the first time.

== Under 20 Nations Cup 2009 (Brunel University, London) ==
=== Final table ===
Position	Nation	Games				Points		Bonus points		Table points
Position	Nation	played	won	drawn	lost	for	against	Tries	Losing	Table points
1	England U20	3	3	0	0	116	10	2	0	14
2	USA U20	3	2	0	1	52	63	1	0	9
3	Wales U20	3	1	0	2	22	47	0	1	5
4	Canada U20	3	0	0	3	31	102	1	1	2

==== Points scoring ====
4 points awarded for a win, 2 points for a draw, no points for a loss. 1 bonus point awarded for scoring four or more tries and 1 bonus point for losing by less than 7 points.

=== Results ===
9 July 2009

USA U20	7–3	Wales U20

Brunel University, London

9 July 2009

England U20	47–0	Canada U20

Brunel University, London

12 July 2009

Canada U20	11–16	Wales U20

Brunel University, London

12 July 2009

England U20	40–7	USA U20

Brunel University, London

15 July 2009

Canada U20	20–38	USA U20

Brunel University, London

15 July 2009

England U20	29–3	Wales U20

Brunel University, London

=== Third place ===
18 July 2009

Canada U20	12–10	Wales U20

Brunel University, London

=== Final ===
18 July 2009

England U20	110–0	USA U20

Brunel University, London

== Nations Cup 2009 (Appleby College, Oakville, Canada) ==
=== Final table ===
Position	Nation	Games				Points		Bonus points		Table points
Position	Nation	played	won	drawn	lost	for	against	Tries	Losing	Table points
1	England	4	4	0	0	126	15	4	0	20
2	United States	4	2	1	1	76	61	1	0	11
3	France	4	1	2	1	52	82	0	0	8
4	Canada	4	1	0	3	52	66	1	2	7
5	South Africa	4	0	1	3	34	116	0	0	2

=== Results ===
10 August 2009

France	17–17	South Africa
Tries: Sandrine Legros, Gabrielle Mutis; Con: Aurelie Bailon (2); Pen: Aurelie Bailon		Tries: Marlize Jordaan (2); Con: Zandile Nojoko (2); Pen: Zandile Nojoko

Oakville, Ontario

10 August 2009

England	36–7	United States
Tries: Fiona Pocock (2), Emily Scarratt (2), Sarah Beale, Joanna McGilchrist; Con: Katy Mclean (3)		Try: Amy Daniels; Con: Steph Bruce

Oakville, Ontario

13 August 2009

England	43–8	France
Tries: Katherine Merchant (3), Emily Scarratt (2), Danielle Waterman, Alice Richardson; Con: Katy Mclean 2		Try: Emilie Moreaux; Pen: Christelle Le Duff

Oakville, Ontario

13 August 2009

Canada	35–17	South Africa
Tries: Marlene Donaldson, Brooke Hilditch, Ashley Patzer, Laura Stoughton, Brittany Waters; Con: Ashley Patzer; Pen: Ashley Patzer		Tries: Natasha Hofmeester, Zandile Nojoko; Con: Zandile Nojoko (2); Pen: Zandile Nojoko

Oakville, Ontario

16 August 2009

South Africa	0–39	United States
		Tries: Victoria Folayan (2), Phaidra Knight (2), Christy Ringgenberg, Beckett Royce; Con: Christy Ringgenberg (4)

Oakville, Ontario

16 August 2009

Canada	7–12	France
Try: Barbara Mervin; Con: Anna Schnell		Pen: Aurelie Bailon (4)

Oakville, Ontario

19 August 2009

England	25–0	South Africa
Tries: Charlotte Barras (2), Rachael Burford, Katherine Merchant; Con: Alice Richardson; Pen: Alice Richardson

Oakville, Ontario

19 August 2009

Canada	10–15	United States
Tries: Tara Eckert, Brittany Waters		Tries: Emilie Bydwell, Amy Daniels; Con: Steph Bruce; Pen: Steph Bruce

Oakville, Ontario

22 August 2009

France	15–15	United States
Tries: Celine Allainmat(2), Céline Barthelemy		Tries: Victoria Folayan, Lynelle Kugler, Christy Ringgenberg

Fletcher's Fields, Toronto

22 August 2009

Canada	0–22	England
		Tries: Fiona Pocock, Rachael Burford, Sarah Hunter, Katherine Merchant; Con: Katy Mclean

Fletcher's Fields, Toronto

== See also ==
- Women's international rugby

Preceded by Nations Cup 2008	Nations Cup; 2009; England	Succeeded by Nations Cup 2011
