= 2011 Nations Cup (women's rugby union) =

2011 Women's Nation's Cup
- Countries: Canada; England; South Africa; United States
- Champions: England (U20 & Senior)
- Runners-up: United States (U20); Canada (Senior)
- Matches played: 16

The third Nations Cup tournament was played at Appleby College and Chatham-Kent in Ontario, Canada, in August 2011 following on from an Under-20 version which took place in California a month before. The tournaments included teams representing the USA, South Africa, England and Canada. England retained both titles.

For USA, Canada and South Africa these were the first internationals they had played since the World Cup. Although the final results in both tournaments were as expected, in the senior event England trailed to both USA and Canada before turning the games round - in the case of the USA game from the final play of the game after 7 minutes of added injury time. Canada led 5-3 at half time in the group game before conceding four second-half tries.

All teams used the group phase of the tournament to try out different formations, selecting their strongest available starting XVs in the finals.

== Under 20 Nations Cup 2011 (Santa Barbara, California) ==
=== Final table ===
Pos	Team	Pld	W	D	L	PF	PA	PD	Pts
1	England U20	3	3	0	0	144	7	+137	12
2	USA U20	3	2	0	1	40	45	−5	8
3	Canada U20	3	1	0	2	32	63	−31	4
4	South Africa U20	3	0	0	3	17	118	−101	0

==== Points scoring ====
4 points awarded for a win, 2 points for a draw, no points for a loss. 1 bonus point awarded for scoring four or more tries and 1 bonus point for losing by less than 7 points.

=== Results ===
14 July 2011

Canada U20	0–41	England U20
	Video and match report	Tries: Natasha Jones 6'; Katie Mason 10'; Rebecca Hughes 21', 79'; Hannah Gallagher 32', 51'; Ceri Large 82'; Cons: Amber Reed 6', 80', 82'

Storke Field, Santa Barbara

14 July 2011

USA U20	27–3	South Africa U20
Tries: Anderson 29'; Washington 35'; Naber 73'; Larson 79'; Cons: Bizer 73', 79'; Pen: Bizer 20'	Video	Pen: Pienaar 18'

Storke Field, Santa Barbara

17 July 2011

Canada U20	27–7	South Africa U20
Tries: Farella 15', 46', 53'; Harvey 64'; DeMerchant 78'; Conv: Harvey 54'	Video	Try: Pieenar 57'; Conv: Pieenar 57'

Storke Field, Santa Barbara

17 July 2011

USA U20	0–37	England U20
	Video	Tries: Davidson 15', 55', 67'; Hughes 21'; Roberts 31'; Mills 41'; Gallagher (77'); Conv: Large 42'

Storke Field, Santa Barbara

20 July 2011

England U20	66–7	South Africa U20
Tries: Gallagher (2); Wilson Hardy; Cleall; Peedle (2); Demaine; E Scott; Matthews (2); Hughes; Davidson; Cons: E Scott (3)	Video	Try: Van Slicht; Conv: Pienaar

Storke Field, Santa Barbara

20 July 2011

USA U20	15–5	Canada U20
	Video

Storke Field, Santa Barbara

Third place

23 July 2011

Canada U20	32–5	South Africa U20
Tries: Thompson; Vestby; Siefert; Orr; Pegg; Delaney; Cons: Vestby (2)	Video

Harder Stadium, Santa Barbara

Final

23 July 2011

USA U20	11–48	England U20
	Video	Tries: Hughes (2); Fletcher; Gallagher (3); Jones; Davidson; Cons: Reed (4)

Harder Stadium, Santa Barbara

== Nations Cup 2011 (Appleby College, Oakville, Canada) ==
=== Final table ===
Position	Nation	Games				Points		Bonus points		Table points
Position	Nation	played	won	drawn	lost	for	against	Tries	Losing	Table points
1	England	3	3	0	0	83	29	1	0	13
2	Canada	3	2	0	1	97	56	2	0	10
3	South Africa	3	1	0	2	51	113	1	0	5
4	United States	3	0	0	3	51	75	0	2	2

=== Results ===
2 August 2011

Canada	52–17	South Africa

Oakville, Ontario

2 August 2011

England	15–11	United States

Oakville, Ontario

5 August 2011

England	46–8	South Africa

Chatham-Kent, Ontario

5 August 2011

Canada	35–17	United States

Chatham-Kent, Ontario

9 August 2011

United States	23–26	South Africa

Oakville, Ontario

9 August 2011

Canada	10–22	England

Oakville, Ontario

Third place

13 August 2011

United States	29–9	South Africa

Oakville, Ontario

Final

13 August 2011

Canada	19–41	England

Oakville, Ontario

== See also ==
- Women's international rugby

Preceded by Nations Cup 2009	Nations Cup; 2011; England	Succeeded by Nations Cup 2013
