= Canada women's national rugby union team =

Canada
- Nicknames: Canucks; Maple Leafs
- Union: Rugby Canada
- Head coach: Kévin Rouet
- Captain: Alex Tessier
First colours	Second colours

World Rugby ranking
- Current: 2 (as of 2 October 2025)
- Highest: 2 (2016, 2024–)

First international
- Canada 3–22 United States (Victoria, British Columbia, Canada; 14 November 1987)

Biggest win
- Canada 98–0 Hong Kong (Dublin, Ireland; 9 August 2017)

Biggest defeat
- Canada 3–88 New Zealand (Edmonton, Canada; 8 September 1996)

World Cup
- Appearances: 9 (First in 1991)
- Best result: Runners-up (2014, 2025)
- Website: rugby.ca/en Rugby Canada

Women's World Rugby Rankings Top 20 rankings as of 6 April 2026
Rank	Change*	Team	Points
1	Steady	England	98.09
2	Steady	Canada	91.53
3	Steady	New Zealand	89.85
4	Steady	France	83.60
5	Steady	Ireland	78.20
6	Steady	Scotland	77.39
7	Steady	Australia	75.46
8	Steady	United States	72.90
9	Steady	Italy	72.37
10	Steady	South Africa	71.62
11	Steady	Japan	69.72
12	Steady	Wales	66.13
13	Steady	Fiji	63.98
14	Steady	Spain	62.42
15	Steady	Samoa	59.72
16	Steady	Hong Kong	57.56
17	Steady	Netherlands	57.42
18	Steady	Russia	55.10
19	Steady	Kazakhstan	53.88
20	▲1	Germany	51.10
*Change from the previous week

The Canada women's national rugby union team represents Canada in international rugby union competitions. They are overseen by Rugby Canada, the governing body of rugby union in Canada.

== History ==
The Canadian women's program began to develop in the 1980s with the first match being played in 1987 in Victoria, British Columbia against another international rugby start-up, the United States. It was the first women's international test match that was played outside of Europe.

In 1991, Canada competed in the inaugural Women's Rugby World Cup in Wales. The team finished in fifth place after defeating Spain 19–4 in the Plate final. Canada has appeared in every World Cup since 1991.

Canada were finalists at the 2014 Rugby World Cup. They were drawn in the same pool with eventual winners, England. They had a 13 all draw during the pool stage before meeting in the final, Canada lost 21–9 and were runners-up.

In 2022, Canada finished fourth after losing to France in the third place final at the delayed 2021 Rugby World Cup.

== Competitive record ==
=== Women's Rugby World Cup ===
Champions Runners-up Third place Tournament played fully or partially on home soil

World Cup record
Year	Round	Position	Pld	W	D	L	PF	PA	Squad
(Wales) 1991	Plate winners	5th	5	3	1	1	80	37	Squad
(Scotland) 1994	Shield finalists	6th	5	2	0	3	105	46	Squad
(Netherlands) 1998	Fourth place	4th	5	2	0	3	52	163	Squad
(Spain) 2002	Fourth place	4th	4	2	0	2	85	94	Squad
(Canada) 2006	Fourth place	4th	5	2	0	3	145	98	Squad
(England) 2010	Fifth place play-off	6th	5	3	0	2	146	66	Squad
(France) 2014	Runners-up	2nd	5	3	1	1	113	62	Squad
(Ireland) 2017	Fifth place play-off	5th	5	4	0	1	213	60	Squad
(New Zealand) 2021	Fourth place	4th	6	4	0	2	143	104	Squad
(England) 2025	Runners-up	2nd	6	5	0	1	240	83	Squad
(Australia) 2029	Qualified								
(United States) 2033	To be determined								
Total	Runners-up	10/10	51	30	2	19	1,322	813	—N/a

== Head-to-head record ==
=== Overall ===
(Full internationals only; Correct as of 23 October 2026)

Rugby: Canada internationals 1987-
Opponent	First game	Played	Won	Drawn	Lost	Percentage
Australia	2014	9	9	0	0	100.00%
England	1993	41	5	2	34	12.5%
Fiji	2022	2	2	0	0	100.00%
France	1996	19	9	0	10	47.37%
Hong Kong	2017	1	1	0	0	100.00%
Ireland	2002	5	4	0	1	80.00%
Italy	1991	3	3	0	0	100.00%
Japan	1994	2	2	0	0	100.00%
Kazakhstan	1994	2	2	0	0	100.00%
Netherlands	1998	1	1	0	0	100.00%
New Zealand	1991	21	2	1	18	9.52%
Samoa	2014	1	1	0	0	100.00%
Scotland	1994	9	8	0	1	88.89%
South Africa	2009	6	6	0	0	100.00%
Sweden	2010	1	1	0	0	100.00%
Soviet Union	1991	1	1	0	0	100.00%
Spain	2006	3	3	0	0	100.00%
United States	1987	49	30	0	19	61.22%
Wales	1991	15	11	2	2	73.33%
Summary	1987	191	101	5	85	52.88%

== Players ==
=== Current squad ===
On 24 July 2025, Kévin Rouet announced Canada's 32-player squad for the 2025 Rugby World Cup.

^{1} On 15 August 2025, Pamphinette Buisa was ruled out of the World Cup after sustaining an injury in a warm-up match against Ireland. She was replaced by Julia Omokhuale.

Note: The age and number of caps listed for each player is as of 22 August 2025, the first day of the tournament.

Player	Position	Date of birth (age)	Caps	Club/province
Gillian Boag	Hooker	19 February 1995 (aged 30)	32	(Canada) Capilano RFC
Taylor McKnight	Hooker	5 April 2003 (aged 22)	1	(Canada) University of Guelph / Aurora Barbarians
Emily Tuttosi	Hooker	21 September 1995 (aged 29)	34	(England) Exeter Chiefs / (Canada) Calgary Hornets
Olivia DeMerchant	Prop	16 February 1991 (aged 34)	60	(Canada) Halifax Tars RFC
McKinley Hunt	Prop	5 January 1997 (aged 28)	32	(England) Saracens / (Canada) Aurora Barbarians
Brittany Kassil	Prop	14 March 1991 (aged 34)	46	(Canada) Guelph Goats
DaLeaka Menin	Prop	16 June 1995 (aged 30)	63	(England) Exeter Chiefs / (Canada) Calgary Hornets
Maya Montiel	Prop	11 October 1999 (aged 25)	5	(England) Saracens
Mikiela Nelson	Prop	27 November 1997 (aged 27)	10	(England) Exeter Chiefs / (Canada) Capilano RFC
Tyson Beukeboom	Second row	10 March 1991 (aged 34)	77	(Canada) Cowichan Piggies / Aurora Barbarians
Caroline Crossley	Second row	19 April 1998 (aged 27)	7	(Canada) Castaway Wanderers
Courtney O'Donnell	Second row	25 April 1999 (aged 26)	46	(Canada) Red Deer Titans Rugby
Julia Omokhuale^{1}	Second row	9 July 2001 (aged 24)	7	(England) Saracens / (Canada) Calgary Irish
Rachel Smith	Second row	7 April 2001 (aged 24)	3	(Canada) University of British Columbia
Pamphinette Buisa^{1}	Back row	28 December 1996 (aged 28)	17	(Canada) Ottawa Irish
Sophie de Goede	Back row	30 June 1999 (aged 26)	35	(England) Saracens / (Canada) Castaway Wanderers
Fabiola Forteza	Back row	4 August 1995 (aged 30)	35	(France) Stade Bordelais Women
Karen Paquin	Back row	3 August 1987 (aged 38)	45	(Canada) Club de rugby de Quebec
Laetitia Royer	Back row	9 February 1991 (aged 34)	18	(England) Saracens / (Canada) Saint-Anne-de-Bellevue RFC
Gabby Senft	Back row	13 June 1997 (aged 28)	32	(England) Saracens / (Canada) Castaway Wanderers
Olivia Apps	Scrum-half	1 December 1998 (aged 26)	18	(England) Saracens / (Canada) Lindsay RFC
Justine Pelletier	Scrum-half	27 February 1996 (aged 29)	37	(France) Stade Bordelais Women
Claire Gallagher	Fly-half	20 April 2000 (aged 25)	18	(England) Trailfinders
Taylor Perry	Fly-half	23 July 2000 (aged 25)	15	(England) Exeter Chiefs / (Canada) Oakville Crusaders
Alex Tessier (c)	Fly-half	3 September 1993 (aged 31)	59	(England) Exeter Chiefs / (Canada) Saint-Anne-de-Bellevue RFC
Alysha Corrigan	Centre	25 January 1997 (aged 28)	21	(England) Saracens
Shoshanah Seumanutafa	Centre	17 September 1999 (aged 25)	18	(New Zealand) Chiefs Manawa
Fancy Bermudez	Wing	27 May 2002 (aged 23)	18	(England) Saracens / (Canada) Westshore RFC
Paige Farries	Wing	12 August 1994 (aged 31)	40	(England) Saracens
Asia Hogan-Rochester	Wing	20 April 1999 (aged 26)	3	(Canada) Toronto Nomads / Westshore RFC
Florence Symonds	Wing	20 May 2002 (aged 23)	12	(Canada) University of British Columbia
Sarah-Maude Lachance	Fullback	7 December 1998 (aged 26)	10	(France) Stade Bordelais Women
Julia Schell	Fullback	13 July 1997 (aged 28)	26	(England) Trailfinders / (Canada) Castaway Wanderers

=== Notable players ===
- Heather Moyse is the first Canadian woman to be inducted into the World Rugby Hall of Fame in 2016. She has represented Canada in rugby, cycling and bobsleigh; She won two gold medals at the Winter Olympics in 2010 and 2014. She has made 22 international appearances for Canada in 15s and has been to two Women's Rugby World Cups in 2006 and 2010. She also helped Canada finish in second place at the 2013 Rugby World Cup Sevens in Russia.

=== Award winners ===
The following Canada players have been recognised at the World Rugby Awards since 2001:

World Rugby 15s Player of the Year
Year	Nominees	Winners
2014	Magali Harvey	Magali Harvey
2014	Kelly Russell	Magali Harvey
2022	Sophie de Goede	—
2024	Alex Tessier	—
2025	Sophie de Goede (2)	Sophie de Goede

World Rugby 15s Dream Team of the Year
Year	No.	Players
2021	7.	Karen Paquin
2022	2.	Emily Tuttosi
2022	8.	Sophie de Goede
2024	5.	Laetitia Royer
2024	7.	Sophie de Goede (2)
2024	12.	Alex Tessier
2025	2.	Emily Tuttosi (2)
2025	4.	Sophie de Goede (3)
2025	9.	Justine Pelletier

== Honours ==
- Women's Rugby World Cup

Runners-up (2): 2014, 2025

- WXV 1

Runners-up (1): 2023

- Pacific Four Series

Champions (2): 2021, 2024
Runners-up (3): 2022, 2023, 2025

- Women's Super Series

Champions (1): 2016

- Women's Nations Cup

Champions (1): 2013
Runners-up (2): 2008, 2011

== Attendance ==
The highest attended matches played in Canada.

Rank	Attendance	Opponent	Date	Venue	Location	Ref.
1	18,621	England	16 October 2026	BMO Field	Toronto	
2	13,117	England	23 October 2026	TD Place Stadium	Ottawa	
3	11,453	United States	1 August 2025	TD Place Stadium	Ottawa	
4	10,092	New Zealand	10 July 2023	TD Place Stadium	Ottawa	
