= 2021 Rugby World Cup Pool A =

Pool A of the 2021 Rugby World Cup began on 8 October 2022. The pool includes hosts and five-time and defending champions New Zealand, Australia and Wales. Australia and Wales finished sixth and seventh respectively in 2017. They are joined by Scotland, the winners of the Final Qualification Tournament.

== Standings ==
Key to colours in pool tables
Advanced to the quarter-finals as one of the top two teams in a pool
Advanced to the quarter-finals as one of the two best third place teams

Pos	Team	Pld	W	D	L	PF	PA	PD	T	B	Pts
1	New Zealand	3	3	0	0	154	29	+125	26	3	15
2	Australia	3	2	0	1	44	60	−16	6	0	8
3	Wales	3	1	0	2	37	84	−47	5	1	5
4	Scotland	3	0	0	3	27	89	−62	5	2	2

All times are local New Zealand Daylight Time (UTC+13)

== Australia vs New Zealand ==
8 October 2022
17:45 NZDT (UTC+13)

Australia	17–41	New Zealand (1 BP)
Try: Terita (2) 13' m, 28' m Wong 16' c Con: McKenzie (1/3) 18'	Report	Try: Ngan-Woo 31' c Woodman (3) 36' m, 47' m, 61' c Tangen-Wainohu 56' c Tui (2) 68' m, 74' m Con: Cocksedge (1/1) 33'; Holmes (2/4) 57', 62'

Eden Park, Auckland
Attendance: 34,235 (Note: The total attendance was 34,235, which was recorded for all 3 matches)
Referee: Aimee Barrett-Theron (South Africa)

Team details

FB	15	Pauline Piliae-Rasabale		(substituted off) 62'
RW	14	Bienne Terita
OC	13	Georgie Friedrichs
IC	12	Sharni Williams
LW	11	Ivania Wong	(yellow card) 52'
FH	10	Arabella McKenzie
SH	9	Iliseva Batibasaga		(substituted off) 57'
N8	8	Grace Hamilton		49' to 63'
OF	7	Shannon Parry (c)	(yellow card) 53'
BF	6	Emily Chancellor
RL	5	Atasi Lafai		(substituted off) 63'
LL	4	Sera Naiqama		(substituted off) 53'
TP	3	Bridie O'Gorman		(substituted off) 61'
HK	2	Adiana Talakai		(substituted off) 49'
LP	1	Liz Patu		(substituted off) 53'
Replacements:
HK	16	Ashley Marsters		(substituted in) 49'
PR	17	Emily Robinson		(substituted in) 53'
PR	18	Asoiva Karpani		(substituted in) 61'
LK	19	Michaela Leonard		(substituted in) 53'
FL	20	Grace Kemp		(substituted in) 49'
SH	21	Layne Morgan		(substituted in) 57'
FH	22	Trilleen Pomare		(substituted in) 61'
WG	23	Lori Cramer		(substituted in) 62'
Coach:
(Australia) Jay Tregonning

FB	15	Renee Holmes	(substituted off) 61'
RW	14	Ruby Tui
OC	13	Stacey Fluhler	(substituted off) 66'
IC	12	Amy du Plessis
LW	11	Portia Woodman
FH	10	Ruahei Demant (c)
SH	9	Kendra Cocksedge	(substituted off) 67'
N8	8	Liana Mikaele-Tu'u
OF	7	Sarah Hirini
BF	6	Charmaine McMenamin	(substituted off) 57'
RL	5	Chelsea Bremner
LL	4	Joanah Ngan-Woo	(substituted off) 49'
TP	3	Amy Rule	(substituted off) 56'
HK	2	Luka Connor	(substituted off) 49'
LP	1	Phillipa Love	(substituted off) 49'
Replacements:
HK	16	Georgia Ponsonby	(substituted in) 49'
PR	17	Awhina Tangen-Wainohu	(substituted in) 49'
PR	18	Santo Taumata	(substituted in) 56'
LK	19	Maia Roos	(substituted in) 49'
FL	20	Kendra Reynolds	(substituted in) 57'
SH	21	Arihiana Marino-Tauhinu	(substituted in) 67'
FH	22	Hazel Tubic	(substituted in) 66'
WG	23	Sylvia Brunt	(substituted in) 61'
Coach:
(New Zealand) Wayne Smith

Player of the Match:
Ruby Tui (New Zealand)

Assistant referees:
Kat Roche (United States)
Doriane Domenjo (France)
Television match official:
Ian Tempest (England)

== Wales vs Scotland ==
9 October 2022
17:45 NZDT (UTC+13)

Wales	18–15	Scotland (1 BP)
Try: Butchers 6' c Powell 34' m Con: Snowsill (1/2) 7'; Pen: Snowsill (1/2) 13'; Bevan (1/1) 80+6'	Report	Try: Skeldon 28' m Gaffney (2) 66' m, 79' m

Northland Events Centre, Whangārei
Referee: Clara Munarini (Italy)

Team details

FB	15	Kayleigh Powell
RW	14	Jasmine Joyce	(yellow card) 77'
OC	13	Megan Webb
IC	12	Hannah Jones (c)
LW	11	Lisa Neumann		(substituted off) 76'
FH	10	Elinor Snowsill		(substituted off) 76'
SH	9	Ffion Lewis		(substituted off) 53'
N8	8	Sioned Harries
OF	7	Alex Callender		(substituted off) 59'
BF	6	Alisha Butchers		(substituted off) 69'
RL	5	Georgia Evans		(substituted off) 55'
LL	4	Natalia John
TP	3	Donna Rose		(substituted off) 55'
HK	2	Carys Phillips		(substituted off) 63'
LP	1	Cara Hope	(yellow card) 65'	(substituted off) 76'
Replacements:
HK	16	Kelsey Jones		(substituted in) 63'
PR	17	Caryl Thomas		(substituted in) 76'
PR	18	Cerys Hale		(substituted in) 55'
LK	19	Siwan Lillicrap		(substituted in) 55'
FL	20	Bethan Lewis		(substituted in) 69'
SH	21	Keira Bevan		(substituted in) 53'
FH	22	Robyn Wilkins		(substituted in) 76'
WG	23	Lowri Norkett		(substituted in) 76'
Coach:
(Wales) Ioan Cunningham

FB	15	Chloe Rollie
RW	14	Rhona Lloyd
OC	13	Hannah Smith
IC	12	Lisa Thomson
LW	11	Megan Gaffney
FH	10	Helen Nelson
SH	9	Caity Mattinson
N8	8	Jade Konkel-Roberts
OF	7	Louise McMillan	(substituted off) 47'
BF	6	Rachel Malcolm (c)
RL	5	Sarah Bonar
LL	4	Emma Wassell
TP	3	Christine Belisle
HK	2	Lana Skeldon
LP	1	Molly Wright	(substituted off) 64'
Replacements:
HK	16	Jodie Rettie		(substituted in) 65'
PR	17	Leah Bartlett	(substituted in) 64'
PR	18	Elliann Clarke
LK	19	Lyndsay O'Donnell
FL	20	Eilidh Sinclair	(substituted in) 47'	(substituted off) 65'
SH	21	Mairi McDonald
FH	22	Meryl Smith
WG	23	Shona Campbell
Coach:
(Scotland) Bryan Easson

Player of the Match:
Elinor Snowsill (Wales)

Assistant referees:
Julianne Zussman (Canada)
Tyler Miller (Australia)
Television match official:
Chris Assmus (Canada)

== Scotland vs Australia ==
15 October 2022
15:00 NZDT (UTC+13)

(1 BP) Scotland	12–14	Australia
Try: Skeldon 9' m Penalty try 27'	Report	Try: Terita 59' c Marsters 73' c Con: Cramer (2/2) 61', 75'

Northland Events Centre, Whangārei
Referee: Lauren Jenner (New Zealand)

Team details

FB	15	Chloe Rollie	(substituted off) 38'
RW	14	Rhona Lloyd
OC	13	Emma Orr
IC	12	Lisa Thomson
LW	11	Hannah Smith
FH	10	Helen Nelson	(substituted off) 71'
SH	9	Caity Mattinson
N8	8	Jade Konkel-Roberts
OF	7	Rachel McLachlan	(substituted off) 75'
BF	6	Rachel Malcolm (c)
RL	5	Sarah Bonar
LL	4	Emma Wassell
TP	3	Christine Belisle	(substituted off) 54'
HK	2	Lana Skeldon
LP	1	Molly Wright	(substituted off) 61'
Replacements:
HK	16	Jodie Rettie	(substituted in) 75'
PR	17	Leah Bartlett	(substituted in) 61'
PR	18	Elliann Clarke	(substituted in) 54'
LK	19	Lyndsay O'Donnell
SH	20	Mairi McDonald
FH	21	Sarah Law	(substituted in) 71'
CE	22	Evie Wills
FB	23	Shona Campbell	(substituted in) 38'
Coach:
(Scotland) Bryan Easson

FB	15	Lori Cramer
RW	14	Bienne Terita		(substituted off) 78'
OC	13	Georgie Friedrichs
IC	12	Sharni Williams		(substituted off) 68'
LW	11	Maya Stewart		(substituted off) 71'
FH	10	Arabella McKenzie
SH	9	Iliseva Batibasaga		(substituted off) 68'
N8	8	Grace Hamilton
OF	7	Shannon Parry (c)		(substituted off) 61'
BF	6	Emily Chancellor
RL	5	Atasi Lafai		(substituted off) 67'
LL	4	Sera Naiqama
TP	3	Asoiva Karpani		(substituted off) 61'
HK	2	Adiana Talakai	(yellow card) 34' (yellow-red card) 80+1'
LP	1	Liz Patu		(substituted off) 62'
Replacements:
HK	16	Ashley Marsters	(red card) 76'	(substituted in) 68'
PR	17	Emily Robinson		(substituted in) 63'
PR	18	Bridie O'Gorman		(substituted in) 61'
LK	19	Grace Kemp		(substituted in) 68'
FL	20	Piper Duck		(substituted in) 61'
SH	21	Layne Morgan		(substituted in) 68'
FH	22	Trilleen Pomare		(substituted in) 68'
FB	23	Pauline Piliae-Rasabale		(substituted in) 71'
Coach:
(Australia) Jay Tregonning

Player of the Match:
Asoiva Karpani (Australia)

Assistant referees:
Aimee Barrett-Theron (South Africa)
Kat Roche (United States)
Television match official:
Lee Jeffrey (New Zealand)

Notes:

- Maya Stewart (Australia) made her international debut.

== Wales vs New Zealand ==
16 October 2022
15:15 NZDT (UTC+13)

Wales	12–56	New Zealand (1 BP)
Try: F. Lewis 40+1' c Harries 78' m Con: Snowsill (1/1) 40+2'	Report	Try: C. Bremner 17' m Woodman (2) 20' m, 28' c Brunt (2) 25' m, 49' m Roos 41' c Fitzpatrick 44' m Murray 57' c Demant 72' m Tui 80+1' m Con: Demant (3/8) 29', 42', 58'

Waitakere Stadium, Auckland
Referee: Hollie Davidson (Scotland)

Team details

FB	15	Kayleigh Powell
RW	14	Jasmine Joyce
OC	13	Megan Webb
IC	12	Hannah Jones	(substituted off) 59'
LW	11	Lisa Neumann
FH	10	Elinor Snowsill	(substituted off) 68'
SH	9	Ffion Lewis	(substituted off) 59'
N8	8	Sioned Harries
OF	7	Bethan Lewis
BF	6	Gwen Crabb
RL	5	Natalia John	(substituted off) 46'
LL	4	Siwan Lillicrap (c)	(substituted off) 70'
TP	3	Donna Rose	(substituted off) 62'
HK	2	Kelsey Jones	(substituted off) 70'
LP	1	Cara Hope	(substituted off) 62'
Replacements:
HK	16	Katherine Evans	(substituted in) 70'
PR	17	Caryl Thomas	(substituted in) 62'
PR	18	Sisilia Tuipulotu	(substituted in) 62'
LK	19	Abbie Fleming	(substituted in) 70'
FL	20	Alex Callender	(substituted in) 46'
SH	21	Keira Bevan	(substituted in) 59'
FH	22	Robyn Wilkins	(substituted in) 68'
CE	23	Kerin Lake	(substituted in) 59'
Coach:
(Wales) Ioan Cunningham

FB	15	Ruby Tui
RW	14	Renee Wickliffe
OC	13	Sylvia Brunt		(substituted off) 57'
IC	12	Theresa Fitzpatrick		(substituted off) 68'
LW	11	Portia Woodman
FH	10	Ruahei Demant (c)
SH	9	Ariana Bayler		(substituted off) 66'
N8	8	Charmaine McMenamin	(yellow card) 75'
OF	7	Kendra Reynolds
BF	6	Alana Bremner		(substituted off) 40'
RL	5	Chelsea Bremner
LL	4	Maia Roos
TP	3	Tanya Kalounivale		(substituted off) 47'
HK	2	Georgia Ponsonby		(substituted off) 53'
LP	1	Awhina Tangen-Wainohu		(substituted off) 53'
Replacements:
HK	16	Luka Connor		(substituted in) 53'
PR	17	Krystal Murray		(substituted in) 53'
PR	18	Santo Taumata		(substituted in) 47'
LK	19	Joanah Ngan-Woo		(substituted in) 66'
FL	20	Sarah Hirini	(yellow card) 70'	(substituted in) 40'
SH	21	Kendra Cocksedge		(substituted in) 66'
CE	22	Amy du Plessis		(substituted in) 57'
FH	23	Hazel Tubic		(substituted in) 68'
Coach:
(New Zealand) Wayne Smith

Player of the Match:
Ruahei Demant (New Zealand)

Assistant referees:
Julianne Zussman (Canada)
Tyler Miller (New Zealand)
Television match official:
Chris Assmus (Canada)

== Australia vs Wales ==
22 October 2022
14:15 NZDT (UTC+13)

Australia	13–7	Wales (1 BP)
Try: Batibasaga 5' c Con: Cramer (1/1) 6'; Pen: Cramer (2/2) 40+1', 78'	Report	Try: Harries 23' c Con: Snowsill (1/1) 25'

Northland Events Centre, Whangārei
Referee: Sara Cox (England)

Team details

FB	15	Lori Cramer
RW	14	Bienne Terita
OC	13	Georgie Friedrichs
IC	12	Sharni Williams		(substituted off) 56'
LW	11	Ivania Wong		(substituted off) 62'
FH	10	Arabella McKenzie
SH	9	Iliseva Batibasaga		(substituted off) 56'
N8	8	Grace Hamilton
OF	7	Shannon Parry (c)		(substituted off) 62'
BF	6	Emily Chancellor
RL	5	Atasi Lafai
LL	4	Michaela Leonard		(substituted off) 62'
TP	3	Bridie O'Gorman		(substituted off) 52'
HK	2	Adiana Talakai		(substituted off) 58'
LP	1	Liz Patu		(substituted off) 52'
Replacements:
HK	16	Tania Naden		(substituted in) 58'
PR	17	Emily Robinson		(substituted in) 52'
PR	18	Asoiva Karpani		(substituted in) 52'
LK	19	Grace Kemp	(yellow card) 70'	(substituted in) 62'
FL	20	Piper Duck		(substituted in) 62'
SH	21	Layne Morgan		(substituted in) 56'
FH	22	Trilleen Pomare		(substituted in) 56'
FB	23	Pauline Piliae-Rasabale		(substituted in) 62'
Coach:
(Australia) Jay Tregonning

FB	15	Niamh Terry	(substituted off) 63'
RW	14	Jasmine Joyce
OC	13	Carys Williams-Morris
IC	12	Hannah Jones (c)
LW	11	Lisa Neumann
FH	10	Elinor Snowsill	(substituted off) 70'
SH	9	Ffion Lewis	(substituted off) 50'
N8	8	Sioned Harries
OF	7	Alex Callender	(substituted off) 74'
BF	6	Bethan Lewis
RL	5	Gwen Crabb
LL	4	Natalia John	(substituted off) 50'
TP	3	Cerys Hale	(substituted off) 58'
HK	2	Kelsey Jones	(substituted off) 53'
LP	1	Cara Hope	(substituted off) 57'
Replacements:
HK	16	Carys Phillips	(substituted in) 52'
PR	17	Caryl Thomas	(substituted in) 57'
PR	18	Sisilia Tuipulotu	(substituted in) 58'
LK	19	Georgia Evans	(substituted in) 50'
LK	20	Siwan Lillicrap	(substituted in) 74'
SH	21	Keira Bevan	(substituted in) 50'
FH	22	Robyn Wilkins	(substituted in) 70'
CE	23	Kerin Lake	(substituted in) 63'
Coach:
(Wales) Ioan Cunningham

Assistant referees:
Julianne Zussman (Canada)
Beatrice Benvenuti (Italy)
Television match official:
Ian Tempest (England)

Notes:

- Siwan Lillicrap (Wales) earned her 50th test cap.

== New Zealand vs Scotland ==
22 October 2022
16:45 NZDT (UTC+13)

(1 BP) New Zealand	57–0	Scotland
Try: Holmes (2) 2' m, 72' m Leti-I'iga 10' m Hirini 12' c Mikaele-Tu'u 17' c Fitzpatrick 30' c Wickliffe (2) 34' c, 39' c Roos 53' c Con: Holmes (6/8) 13', 18', 31', 35', 40', 54'	Report

Northland Events Centre, Whangārei
Referee: Aurélie Groizeleau (France)

Team details

FB	15	Renee Holmes
RW	14	Renee Wickliffe
OC	13	Amy du Plessis
IC	12	Theresa Fitzpatrick
LW	11	Ayesha Leti-I'iga		(substituted off) 48'
FH	10	Hazel Tubic
SH	9	Arihiana Marino-Tauhinu (c)		(substituted off) 46'
N8	8	Liana Mikaele-Tu'u
OF	7	Sarah Hirini			(substituted off) 76'
BF	6	Alana Bremner		(substituted off) 61'
RL	5	Maia Roos
LL	4	Joanah Ngan-Woo		(substituted off) 55'
TP	3	Amy Rule		(substituted off) 55'	(substituted in) 76'
HK	2	Georgia Ponsonby		(substituted off) 46'
LP	1	Phillipa Love		(substituted off) 46'
Replacements:
HK	16	Natalie Delamere		(substituted in) 46'
PR	17	Krystal Murray		(substituted in) 46'
PR	18	Tanya Kalounivale	(yellow card) 63'	(substituted in) 55'
LK	19	Chelsea Bremner		(substituted in) 55'
FL	20	Kendra Reynolds		(substituted in) 63'
SH	21	Kendra Cocksedge		(substituted in) 46'
CE	22	Sylvia Brunt		(substituted in) 48'
FH	23	Ruahei Demant
Coach:
(New Zealand) Wayne Smith

FB	15	Shona Campbell
RW	14	Rhona Lloyd	(substituted off) 63'
OC	13	Emma Orr
IC	12	Lisa Thomson
LW	11	Hannah Smith
FH	10	Helen Nelson	(substituted off) 66'
SH	9	Caity Mattinson	(substituted off) 55'
N8	8	Jade Konkel-Roberts
OF	7	Rachel McLachlan	(substituted off) 63'
BF	6	Rachel Malcolm (c)	(substituted off) 70'
RL	5	Sarah Bonar	(substituted off) 70'
LL	4	Emma Wassell
TP	3	Christine Belisle	(substituted off) 55'
HK	2	Lana Skeldon
LP	1	Molly Wright	(substituted off) 63'
Replacements:
HK	16	Jodie Rettie	(substituted in) 70'
PR	17	Leah Bartlett	(substituted in) 63'
PR	18	Katie Dougan	(substituted in) 55'
LK	19	Lyndsay O'Donnell	(substituted in) 70'
FL	20	Louise McMillan	(substituted in) 63'
SH	21	Mairi McDonald	(substituted in) 55'
CE	22	Meryl Smith	(substituted in) 67'
WG	23	Liz Musgrove	(substituted in) 63'
Coach:
(Scotland) Bryan Easson

Player of the Match:
Theresa Fitzpatrick (New Zealand)

Assistant referees:
Clara Munarini (Italy)
Kat Roche (United States)
Television match official:
Chris Assmus (Canada)
