= 2021 Rugby World Cup final =

Women's rugby union event in New Zealand

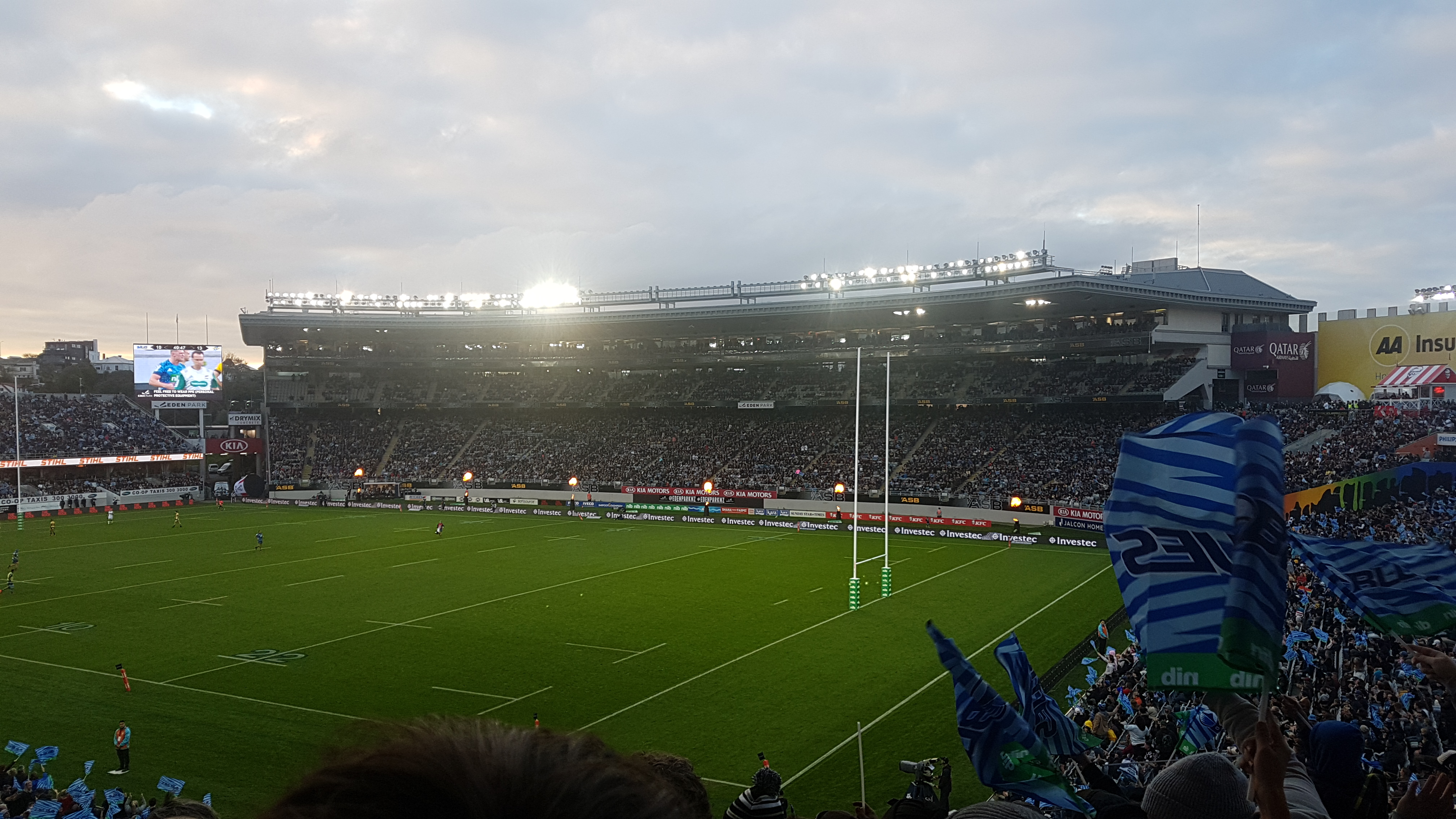
- Eden Park, the match venue (pictured here during the Blues vs Hurricanes match in the 2020 Super Rugby Aotearoa season)
- Event: 2021 Rugby World Cup
England	New Zealand
(England)	(New Zealand)
31	34
- Date: 12 November 2022
- Venue: Eden Park, Auckland
- Player of the Match: Ruahei Demant (New Zealand)
- Referee: Hollie Davidson (Scotland)
- Attendance: 42,579

The 2021 Rugby World Cup final was the final match of the 2021 Rugby World Cup, the ninth edition of the women's Rugby World Cup and the seventh organised by World Rugby for women's national rugby union teams. The match was contested between two-time champions England, and hosts and five-time and defending champions New Zealand on 12 November 2022 at Eden Park in Auckland, New Zealand, postponed from the previous year. This was the fifth time that these two nations met in a Rugby World Cup final, following the 2002, 2006, 2010 and 2017 editions. New Zealand won the Rugby World Cup for a record sixth time, beating England 34–31. New Zealand captain Ruahei Demant was named the player of the match.

== Background ==
The 2021 Rugby World Cup, the ninth edition of the women's Rugby World Cup, was held in New Zealand between 8 October and 12 November 2022, postponed from 18 September to 18 October 2021. Twelve teams contested the final tournament, playing 26 matches. The top seven placed teams from the 2017 World Cup automatically qualified for the tournament, while the remaining five spots were decided in qualifying rounds between 9 August 2019 and 21 February 2022 from 23 teams.

Teams were divided into three pools of four teams, with each team playing each other once in a round-robin format. The top two teams in each pool, plus the two best-ranked third-placed teams, qualified for the quarter-finals, the first time the quarter-finals appeared in the Women's World Cup since 2002. Rights to host the final was awarded to Eden Park, the national stadium of New Zealand that had previously hosted men's Rugby World Cup finals in 1987 and 2011, making it the first venue to host finals in men's and women's Rugby World Cups. It also played host to three pool games on opening day, as well as the semi-finals and third place play-off.

England won the tournament on two previous occasions in 1994 and 2014, with New Zealand having won on a record five occasions, in 1998, 2002, 2006, 2010 and 2017. At least one of England and New Zealand have appeared in every Rugby World Cup final, often competing against each other; on only one occasion (the first World Cup in 1991) has neither team been champion. The 2021 final was the 30th match between England and New Zealand. They first played against each other in Burnham, New Zealand, in 1997 where New Zealand won 67–0 (England's biggest defeat); since then, England had won 10 meetings, 18 previous matches were won by New Zealand, and a single game had been drawn in Esher, England, in 2011. (Note: See List of New Zealand women's national rugby union team matches)

Having a long rivalry and being the undisputed strongest teams in the world, the nations met previously in five of the past six World Cups, four of which were finals. The most recent match between them before the 2021 World Cup was played at Franklin's Gardens in Northampton, England, on 7 November 2021, with England winning 56–15 (New Zealand's biggest defeat); they had also played a week earlier, which was at the time New Zealand's biggest defeat. England had won their last 30 test matches, a world record run, since they last lost to New Zealand in July 2019, while New Zealand had been unbeaten since a record four consecutive losses which involved their last two meetings with England. In the World Rugby rankings at the start of the competition, England was ranked first and New Zealand was ranked second.

== Route to the final ==
=== England ===
England's route to the final
	Opponent	Result
Pool stage	Fiji	84–19
Pool stage	France	13–7
Pool stage	South Africa	75–0
QF	Australia	41–5
SF	Canada	26–19

England qualified automatically for the tournament by world ranking, entering as favourites. They competed in Pool C in the pool stage, against another automatic qualifier in France, and two regional champions, Fiji and South Africa, considered unknown quantities.

England's first pool match was against Fiji. Described as an "annihilation", eleven different England players got on the score sheet, though Fiji held their own in the first half, scoring two tries (a third would come at the very end of the match). England's early lead challenged come halftime, but they responded in the second half with ten tries, dominant in possession.

In a more competitive match, England next faced France, in a game less exciting than both teams usually deliver. With the pitchside ambulances said to be busier than most of the players in the first half, France went down important players early on and set to defense; England was constantly in attack but unimpressive at finishing. In the final ten minutes, England confirmed their win.

Having already confirmed their position at the top of Pool C, England's final match was against South Africa. Winless South Africa needed to defeat England to reach the third position in the pool and potentially advance, but England scored 13 tries to no response; they took the most tries, most points-for, and greatest points difference of all teams in the pool stage. (Note: See also Pool rankings)

In the knockout stage, England played their quarter-final against Australia, runners-up of their pool. In a match marked by handling errors, England's dominance in the scrum helped them to a confident win, scoring routinely throughout the match, with Australia scoring a single unconverted try just before halftime. England's semi-final saw them play Canada, who had also won their pool, in a more difficult match; though they were never behind in the scores, England became exposed defensively and, uncommonly, in set pieces as Canada played well throughout. England ultimately won by seven points to advance to the final following what The Telegraph described as "one of the greatest contests of all time, men's or women's."

=== New Zealand ===
New Zealand's route to the final
	Opponent	Result
Pool stage	Australia	41–17
Pool stage	Wales	56–12
Pool stage	Scotland	57–0
QF	Wales	55–3
SF	France	25–24

New Zealand qualified automatically for the tournament both as the 2017 champions and as the host nation. They competed in Pool A in the pool stage, against fellow automatic qualifiers Australia and Wales, and European Qualification Tournament runner-up Scotland.

The opening game of the tournament saw New Zealand run to a confident win over Australia after falling behind by three tries and 17 points in the first half; two answering tries in the first half, followed by Australia seeing two players sent to the sin bin at the same time at the start of the second half, set up New Zealand for a comeback, scoring a further five tries without Australia getting over the try line again.

Their next match saw them defeat Wales in a dominant game; though taking 17 minutes to open scoring, New Zealand scored three more times in the next ten minutes to end the first half 22 points up before Wales responded in the first minute of the second half; New Zealand immediately scored once more, and twice again in the next ten minutes, continuing through the second half. Wales got a second try minutes from full-time, with New Zealand also scoring one last time in response.

New Zealand had secured the top position in Pool A before playing its final match, which was against Scotland, considered a much weaker team. Scotland had lost both of its previous matches and would need to defeat New Zealand to come third in the pool, which could lead to advancement depending on the final standings of all pools. New Zealand opened scoring two minutes in, and would score seven tries in the first half; a more subdued second half saw only two New Zealand tries, with Scotland kept off the score sheet completely.

In their quarter-final, New Zealand encountered Wales once more, as the second-best third-placed team from the pools. The match played out much like their pool stage meeting, with New Zealand "demolishing" Wales, though the team was fierce in defence to prevent a larger points gap. New Zealand's semi-final was a tight match against France, a pool stage runner-up; France opened scoring and though New Zealand responded they were still seven points down at halftime. They took the lead with two second-half tries and a penalty kick, hanging on as France leveled the tries. France went down a player in the 70th minute, but New Zealand failed to capitalise, with France getting the last chance to score, from a penalty kick in the last minute; kicked wide, New Zealand won by a point.

== Match ==
=== Summary ===
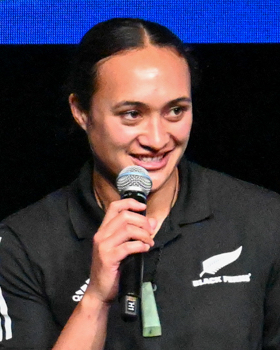
New Zealand captain Ruahei Demant was named player of the match

At the start of play, England established the dominance they would have in the opening minutes of the game; the first try was scored by English fullback Ellie Kildunne in the third minute and was converted by kicker Emily Scarratt. Play moved to inside the England 22-metre line after restart. Though New Zealand won a penalty in the sixth minute and elected to kick for goal, it did not go over; their subsequent restart escaped the clutches of their right-sided players and went into touch, with play ending up inside New Zealand's 22. Their captain, Ruahei Demant, managed to run the ball into the England half, threatening the defence, until New Zealand conceded a penalty. England chose to take a line-out, kicking close to the try line and winning the throw, then playing a ruck and maul to successfully push over the line for Amy Cokayne to score in the 13th minute, with Scarratt also converting this for England to lead by 14 points in as many minutes.

Play returned to New Zealand, with winger Portia Woodman, bolstered by advantage play after an England knock on, running for a try but being pushed into touch near the line by a Lydia Thompson tackle. Woodman stayed down off the pitch as the referee looked to restart play, with England winning the ball off New Zealand and kicking it downfield; medics and video referee intervened in the 17th minute, taking Woodman off due to a head injury and showing that the first point of contact in Thompson's tackle was her head. Thompson was shown a red card and sent off. Ayesha Leti-I'iga replaced Woodman.

A minute later, New Zealand scored their first try of the match, winning a maul themselves to send Georgia Ponsonby over the line, converted by Renee Holmes. Handling errors then saw New Zealand lose the ball to England, who repeated the play of their second try to score a third, this time by Marlie Packer, though Scarratt missed the conversion. England then knocked on, allowing New Zealand to copy their try attempt; though New Zealand could not push their maul forward this time, a pass wide allowed Leti-I'iga, with space in Thompson's absence, to receive the ball and dive over the line in the 25th minute. Holmes successfully converted the try.

Restart saw messy play, with both teams losing possession, before England pushed forward by the try line but lost the ball again due to Zoe Aldcroft dropping the ball for a knock on as she went down; play continued with New Zealand opting for a scrum, though medics intervened, assessing the still-down Aldcroft on the pitch before taking her off with a head injury in the 27th minute. She was replaced by Catherine O'Donnell and New Zealand took their scrum. England found some form again, pushing a maul towards the try line before New Zealand players collapsed it, with England then trying to play the advantage with a pass; Holmes intercepted the pass and ran the length of the pitch, eventually grounding the ball, though the referee had been blowing her whistle for the duration to signal to return the ball to England for the maul collapse. England took the penalty with another maul and drove it over the line in the 32nd minute, Cokayne supplying her second try and Scarratt her third conversion.

England continued with strong play for the remainder of the first half, seeing a quick ball return after handling errors by New Zealand and then a penalty from scrum discipline; though England won a line-out by the try line, New Zealand won the ball and began to pass it down their line towards the left. England held them in the centre, but gave away advantage play in the process, and New Zealand eventually got the ball to the left and England's gap in defence for Leti-I'iga to make another run. Though England's defence caught her, New Zealand had the previous advantage and chose to take a line-out; as they pushed their maul towards the try line, Amy Rule spun off the back of it with the ball to cross the line and ground it. In the last touch of the first half, Holmes did not manage the conversion.

Returning from half time, England replaced captain Sarah Hunter with Poppy Cleall, leaving Scaratt as captain on the pitch. Looking to make further headway into the point deficit, New Zealand made creative plays in the first minute, Stacey Fluhler and Holmes working together to get the ball over in the 41st minute, though Holmes again missed the goal. In play after the restart, Scarratt fought to win the ball back for England, but it was given back to New Zealand after England error. England struggled to regain possession or break forward when they had it and turned to defensive play within their own half as New Zealand continued to push. A New Zealand knock-on gave them some reprise, though also coming with interchanges to freshen the Black Ferns; England failed to kick the ball as they intended and lost possession. They still caused New Zealand problems in the centre, but the Black Ferns passed to the left again and, only a few minutes after coming on, Krystal Murray managed to get the ball over the line in the 49th minute, sending New Zealand into the lead for the first time.

Lucy Packer, England scrum-half who herself was only added to the start list on the morning of the final, was taken off in the 52nd minute, replaced by Claudia MacDonald, just as England set up to take a scrum. New Zealand broke the scrum, conceding the penalty to England, who chose another line-out; in a recreation of their second try, England drove the maul over the line for a third Cokayne try, taking the lead back, though Scarratt missed the conversion. New Zealand's right winger, Ruby Tui, started asserting her position more and began pushing attacks down the pitch, though England responded better on New Zealand's right (their left) side and took the ball back after several unsuccessful plays. A series of mistakes saw possession change hands several times, and several scrums awarded, for about ten minutes around the hour mark. England's Abbie Ward, having taken much of the slack on England's right side (New Zealand's left) after Thompson's early departure, began to noticeably tire and was targeted in attacks, while New Zealand started putting on more replacements and England held out.

The deadlock appeared to be broken in the 65th minute as Abby Dow made a long run out for England, but she was pushed out by New Zealand co-captain Kennedy Simon; video referee found that while Simon had hit Dow's head with her own, contact started with her shoulder, and so it was mitigated and Simon was only sent to the sin bin for ten minutes rather than getting sent off. After being helped up by medics, Dow continued to play for a few minutes, before she could be replaced by Tatyana Heard and go off for a head injury assessment; Dow was the only player to pass the assessment and be allowed to return to the pitch, which she did in the 77th minute. MacDonald tried to make the most of equal numbers by pushing down the centre, but slow play saw a power struggle between the teams in the middle of the pitch, with England eventually conceding a line out to New Zealand; the Black Ferns played to their left side to again send Leti-I'iga over for a try, retaking the lead but still failing to convert.

In the last ten minutes, New Zealand made their final replacement shortly before England replaced their Front Row and Simon was reinstated from the sin bin. England made their first asserted attacking play for a while, but lost possession, and Dow came back on for Heard. In the final minutes of the game, England won several penalties in New Zealand's half. With seconds left on the clock, England chose to push for a try rather than kick for goal, which would have tied the scores and taken the match to extra time. They managed to take the line-out close to the try line, but New Zealand challenged for the ball in the air and won it, taking it to the ground to bring end of play.

=== Details ===
12 November 2022
19:30 NZDT (UTC+13)

England	31–34	New Zealand
Try: Kildunne 3' c Cokayne (3) 13' c, 32' c, 54' m M. Packer 21' m Con: Scarratt (3/5) 4', 15', 33'	Report	Try: Ponsonby 18' c Leti-I'iga (2) 25' c, 71' m Rule 40' m Fluhler 41' m Murray 49' m Con: Holmes (2/6) 20', 26'

Eden Park, Auckland
Attendance: 42,579
Referee: Hollie Davidson (Scotland)

FB	15	Ellie Kildunne
RW	14	Lydia Thompson	(red card) 18'
OC	13	Emily Scarratt
IC	12	Holly Aitchison
LW	11	Abby Dow		67' to 77'
FH	10	Zoe Harrison
SH	9	Lucy Packer		(substituted off) 50'
N8	8	Sarah Hunter (c)		(substituted off) 41'
OF	7	Marlie Packer		(substituted off) 50'
BF	6	Alex Matthews
RL	5	Abbie Ward
LL	4	Zoe Aldcroft		(substituted off) 27'
TP	3	Sarah Bern		(substituted off) 73'
HK	2	Amy Cokayne		(substituted off) 73'
LP	1	Vickii Cornborough		(substituted off) 73'
Replacements:
HK	16	Lark Davies		(substituted on) 73'
PR	17	Maud Muir		(substituted on) 73'
PR	18	Shaunagh Brown		(substituted on) 73'
LK	19	Catherine O'Donnell		(substituted on) 27'
N8	20	Poppy Cleall		(substituted on) 41'
FL	21	Sadia Kabeya		(substituted on) 50'
SH	22	Claudia MacDonald		(substituted on) 50'
CE	23	Tatyana Heard		(substituted on) 67'	(substituted off) 77'
Coach:
(England) Simon Middleton

FB	15	Renee Holmes
RW	14	Ruby Tui
OC	13	Stacey Fluhler		(substituted off) 71'
IC	12	Theresa Fitzpatrick
LW	11	Portia Woodman		(substituted off) 17'
FH	10	Ruahei Demant (c)
SH	9	Kendra Cocksedge
N8	8	Charmaine McMenamin		(substituted off) 50'
OF	7	Sarah Hirini
BF	6	Alana Bremner
RL	5	Chelsea Bremner
LL	4	Maia Roos		(substituted off) 63'
TP	3	Amy Rule		(substituted off) 62'
HK	2	Georgia Ponsonby		(substituted off) 46'
LP	1	Phillipa Love		(substituted off) 46'
Replacements:
HK	16	Luka Connor		(substituted on) 46'
PR	17	Krystal Murray		(substituted on) 46'
PR	18	Santo Taumata		(substituted on) 62'
LK	19	Joanah Ngan-Woo		(substituted on) 63'
FL	20	Kennedy Simon (c)	(yellow card) 65'	(substituted on) 50'
SH	21	Ariana Bayler
FH	22	Hazel Tubic		(substituted on) 71'
WG	23	Ayesha Leti-I'iga		(substituted on) 17'
Coach:
(New Zealand) Wayne Smith

Player of the Match:
Ruahei Demant (New Zealand)

Assistant referees:
Aimee Barrett-Theron (South Africa)
Aurélie Groizeleau (France)
Television match official:
Ben Whitehouse (Wales)

Notes:

- Lucy Packer (England) came into the starting line-up on the day of the match due to an injury to Leanne Infante.

== Aftermath ==
The early red card to England's Thompson left the team down a player for most of the match before eventually losing; the rest of the team said afterwards that they did not blame her for the loss, with captain Hunter saying it was up to the players on the pitch to deliver and, though the England side "left no stone unturned, [they] left everything on the pitch", that New Zealand found a way and they did not. Coach Simon Middleton said in his interview after the match that the red card "didn't help", elaborating that it made a tough contest tougher but that he was proud of the England performance and recognised New Zealand's skill. Men's coach Eddie Jones was also asked about it, and compared red cards in recent years to electric car chargers, saying that they are suddenly everywhere and it is no longer impossible to win a match after receiving one early on. Jones also posited "Who beats New Zealand at Eden Park?" Former England player Victoria Fleetwood instead opined that the red card was the deciding factor, and that England would have certainly won had it not been given.

Former player and World Cup winner Katherine Merchant criticised the medical staff at the game for not immediately removing Dow from the field when she was visibly affected by head injury, with the medics reportedly unsure if she had been unconscious. The Rugby Football Union chief executive Bill Sweeney had questioned the medics at the game on the incident, noting that they said they spent a minute to review footage before taking the player off, with Sweeney arguing that as a precaution players should, and usually are, taken off immediately for the head injury assessment.

Popular New Zealand news website Stuff argued that, despite criticisms towards some of the major calls by the referees in the game (particularly the head impact caused by a New Zealand player only receiving a yellow card despite the earlier red and a late penalty try not being awarded to England for New Zealand interference by the try line), the officials "handled the huge occasion with aplomb".

== See also ==
- List of Rugby World Cup red cards
