= 2022 Laurie O'Reilly Cup =

2022 rugby union competition

Tournament details
- Date: 20–27 August 2022
- Countries: Australia; New Zealand
- Teams: 2

Final positions
- Champions: New Zealand

Tournament statistics
- Matches played: 2
- Tries scored: 14 (7 per match)
- Top scorer(s): Ruahei Demant (17 points)
- Most tries: Ruahei Demant; Joanah Ngan-Woo; Ayesha Leti-I'iga; Luka Connor; Bienne Terita (2 tries each)

The 2022 Laurie O'Reilly Cup was the 13th edition of the competition. The matches were played on 20 and 27 August, with both Australia and New Zealand hosting one match each.

After a two-year absence due to the COVID-19 pandemic, it was confirmed that the competition would return. The first test was played in Christchurch at the Orangetheory Stadium on 20 August 2022. The second test was played in a curtain raiser to the Wallabies and Springboks test in Adelaide on 27 August 2022.

The Black Ferns won the first test in Christchurch with an overwhelming 52–5 score and retained the O'Reilly Cup. They won the series after winning the second test in a hard-fought match, the game ended 14–22.

== Table ==
| Pos. | Nation | Games | | | | Points | | |
| Pos. | Nation | Played | Won | Drawn | Lost | For | Against | Diff. |
|---|---|---|---|---|---|---|---|---|
| 1 | New Zealand | 2 | 2 | 0 | 0 | 74 | 19 | +55 |
| 2 | Australia | 2 | 0 | 0 | 2 | 19 | 74 | –55 |

== Fixtures ==
=== First match ===
| Test: 1497 | 20 August 2022 | New Zealand | 52–5 | Australia | Orangetheory Stadium, Christchurch |
| | 19:05 NZST (UTC+12) | Try: Ruahei Demant (2) 17' c, 49' c Joanah Ngan-Woo 23' m Amy du Plessis 30' c Kendra Cocksedge 32' c Ayesha Leti-I'iga (2) 45' c, 55' m Luka Connor 75' c Con: Kendra Cocksedge (3/4) 14', 29', 45'; Renee Holmes (3/4) 32', 49', 75' | Report | Try: Piper Duck 80' m Con: Arabella McKenzie (0/1) | Referee: Maggie Cogger-Orr (New Zealand) |

| FB | 15 | Renee Holmes |
| RW | 14 | Ruby Tui |
| OC | 13 | Amy du Plessis | (substituted off) 70' |
| IC | 12 | Theresa Fitzpatrick | (substituted off) 76' |
| LW | 11 | Ayesha Leti-I'iga |
| FH | 10 | Ruahei Demant (cc) |
| SH | 9 | Kendra Cocksedge | (substituted off) 46' |
| N8 | 8 | Charmaine McMenamin | (substituted off) 53' |
| BF | 7 | Kennedy Simon (cc) |
| OF | 6 | Alana Bremner |
| RL | 5 | Chelsea Bremner |
| LL | 4 | Joanah Ngan-Woo | (substituted off) 60' |
| TP | 3 | Tanya Kalounivale | (substituted off) 47' |
| HK | 2 | Georgia Ponsonby | (substituted off) 47' |
| LP | 1 | Pip Love | (substituted off) 47' |
| Replacements: |
| HK | 16 | Luka Connor | (substituted on) 47' |
| PR | 17 | Awhina Tangen-Wainohu | (substituted on) 47' |
| PR | 18 | Amy Rule | (substituted on) 47' |
| LK | 19 | Tafito Lafaele | (substituted on) 60' |
| FL | 20 | Kendra Reynolds | (substituted on) 53' |
| SH | 21 | Tyla Nathan-Wong | (substituted on) 46' |
| CE | 22 | Sylvia Brunt | (substituted on) 70' |
| CE | 23 | Hazel Tubic | (substituted on) 76' |
| Coach: |
| (New Zealand) Wayne Smith |

| FB | 15 | Pauline Piliae-Rasabale |
| RW | 14 | Mahalia Murphy | (substituted off) 57' |
| OC | 13 | Georgina Friedrichs |
| IC | 12 | Cecilia Smith | (substituted off) 51' |
| LW | 11 | Ivania Wong |
| FH | 10 | Arabella McKenzie |
| SH | 9 | Iliseva Batibasaga | (substituted off) 60' |
| N8 | 8 | Grace Kemp |
| BF | 7 | Shannon Parry (c) | (substituted off) 59' |
| OF | 6 | Emily Chancellor |
| RL | 5 | Kaitlan Leaney | (substituted off) 59' |
| LL | 4 | Michaela Leonard |
| TP | 3 | Bridie O'Gorman | (substituted off) 59' |
| HK | 2 | Ashley Marsters | (substituted off) 51' |
| LP | 1 | Bree-Anna Cheatham | (substituted off) 51' |
| Replacements: |
| HK | 16 | Adiana Talakai | (substituted on) 51' |
| PR | 17 | Emily Robinson | (substituted on) 51' |
| PR | 18 | Eva Karpani | (substituted on) 59' |
| LK | 19 | Atasi Lafai | (substituted on) 59' |
| FL | 20 | Piper Duck | (substituted on) 59' |
| SH | 21 | Layne Morgan | (substituted on) 60' |
| CE | 22 | Trilleen Pomare | (substituted on) 51' |
| FB | 23 | Lori Cramer | (substituted on) 57' |
| Coach: |
| (Australia) Jay Tregonning |

Assistant referees:
(Australia) Amber McLachlin
(Australia) Tyler Miller
Television match official:
(New Zealand) Lee Jeffery

Notes:

- Awhina Tangen-Wainohu and Tyla Nathan-Wong of the Black Ferns, and Bree-Anna Cheatham (Australia) made their international debuts.
- Charmaine McMenamin (New Zealand) returns for her first test match since 2019.
- New Zealand win their 21st test match against the Wallaroos.
- New Zealand and Australia haven't played for the O’Reilly Cup since 2019.

=== Second match ===
| Test: 1501 | 27 August 2022 | Australia | 14–22 | New Zealand | Adelaide Oval, Adelaide |
| | 14:45 NZST (UTC+12) | Try: Bienne Terita (2) 11' c, 80' c Con: Arabella McKenzie (2/2) 12', 81' | Report | Try: Luka Connor 25' c Joanah Ngan-Woo 51' c Kendra Reynolds 64' m Con: Ruahei Demant (2/3) 27', 52'; Pen: Ruahei Demant (1/1) 20' | Referee: (Australia) Amber McLachlan |

| FB | 15 | Pauline Piliae-Rasabale | | (substituted off) 69' |
| RW | 14 | Bienne Terita |
| OC | 13 | Georgina Friedrichs |
| IC | 12 | Siokapesi Palu |
| LW | 11 | Ivania Wong | | (substituted off) 53' |
| FH | 10 | Arabella McKenzie |
| SH | 9 | Iliseva Batibasaga | | (substituted off) 67' |
| N8 | 8 | Grace Hamilton |
| BF | 7 | Shannon Parry (c) | | (substituted off) 67' |
| OF | 6 | Emily Chancellor |
| RL | 5 | Michaela Leonard | | (substituted off) 60' |
| LL | 4 | Atasi Lafai | (yellow card) 28' to 38' |
| TP | 3 | Eva Karpani | | (substituted off) 33' (substituted on) 77' |
| HK | 2 | Adiana Talakai | | (substituted off) 55' |
| LP | 1 | Liz Patu | | (substituted off) 33' |
| Replacements: |
| HK | 16 | Ashley Marsters | | (substituted on) 55' |
| PR | 17 | Emily Robinson | | (substituted on) 33' (substituted off) 77' |
| PR | 18 | Bridie O'Gorman | | (substituted on) 33' |
| LK | 19 | Kaitlan Leaney | | (substituted on) 60' |
| LF | 20 | Piper Duck | | (substituted on) 67' |
| SH | 21 | Layne Morgan | | (substituted on) 67' |
| FH | 22 | Trilleen Pomare | | (substituted on) 53' |
| FB | 23 | Lori Cramer | | (substituted on) 69' |
| Coach: |
| (Australia) Jay Tregonning |

| FB | 15 | Grace Steinmetz |
| RW | 14 | Ruby Tui |
| OC | 13 | Sylvia Brunt |
| IC | 12 | Chelsea Semple | (yellow card) 12' to 22' | (substituted off) 24' |
| LW | 11 | Ayesha Leti-I'iga |
| FH | 10 | Ruahei Demant (cc) |
| SH | 9 | Ariana Bayler | | (substituted off) 50' |
| N8 | 8 | Kennedy Simon (cc) | | (substituted off) 29' |
| BF | 7 | Kendra Reynolds |
| OF | 6 | Alana Bremner |
| RL | 5 | Joanah Ngan-Woo | | (substituted off) 60' |
| LL | 4 | Maiakawanakaulani Roos |
| TP | 3 | Tanya Kalounivale | | (substituted off) 46' |
| HK | 2 | Luka Connor | | (substituted off) 61' |
| LP | 1 | Pip Love | | (substituted off) 50' |
| Replacements: |
| HK | 16 | Natalie Delamere | | (substituted on) 61' |
| PR | 17 | Krystal Murray | | (substituted on) 50' |
| PR | 18 | Santo Taumata | | (substituted on) 46' |
| LK | 19 | Chelsea Bremner | | (substituted on) 60' |
| FL | 20 | Charmaine McMenamin | | (substituted on) 29' |
| SH | 21 | Arihiana Marino-Tauhinu | | (substituted on) 50' |
| OB | 22 | Renee Holmes |
| IB | 23 | Hazel Tubic | | (substituted on) 24' |
| Coach: |
| (New Zealand) Wayne Smith |

Assistant referees:
(New Zealand) Maggie Cogger-Orr
(Australia) Tyler Miller
Television match official:
(New Zealand) Lee Jeffery

Notes:

- This will be the 22nd Test between New Zealand and Australia, the Black Ferns have won every Test between the nations.
- Ariana Bayler (New Zealand) gets her first start at Scrum-half, her previous four Tests were off the bench.
- Grace Steinmetz made her test debut, while Santo Taumata made her international debut for the Black Ferns.
- Siokapesi Palu and Bienne Terita made their international debuts for the Wallaroos.

== Squads ==
=== Australia ===
On 2 August, head coach Jay Tregonning named a 32-player squad for the 2022 Laurie O'Reilly Cup.

Head coach: (Australia) Jay Tregonning

| Player | Super Club | Caps |
|---|---|---|
| Iliseva Batibasaga | NSW Waratahs | 20 |
| Emily Chancellor | NSW Waratahs | 10 |
| Bree-Anna Cheatham | Queensland Reds | new cap |
| Lori Cramer | NSW Waratahs | 9 |
| Piper Duck | NSW Waratahs | 5 |
| Georgina Friedrichs | NSW Waratahs | 5 |
| Grace Hamilton | NSW Waratahs | 20 |
| Eva Karpani | NSW Waratahs | 7 |
| Grace Kemp | Brumbies | 1 |
| Atasi Lafai | NSW Waratahs | 2 |
| Kaitlan Leaney | NSW Waratahs | 5 |
| Michaela Leonard | Brumbies | 9 |
| Ashley Marsters | Melbourne Rebels | 15 |
| Arabella McKenzie | NSW Waratahs | 9 |
| Layne Morgan | NSW Waratahs | 5 |
| Mahalia Murphy | NSW Waratahs | 16 |
| Tania Naden | Brumbies | new cap |
| Sera Naiqama | NSW Waratahs | 3 |
| Bridie O'Gorman | NSW Waratahs | 5 |
| Siokapesi Palu | Brumbies | new cap |
| Shannon Parry | Queensland Reds | 17 |
| Liz Patu | Queensland Reds | 28 |
| Pauline Piliae-Rasabale | NSW Waratahs | 5 |
| Trilleen Pomare | Western Force | 16 |
| Emily Robinson | NSW Waratahs | 11 |
| Madison Schuck | Queensland Reds | 5 |
| Cecilia Smith | Queensland Reds | 3 |
| Maya Stewart | NSW Waratahs | new cap |
| Adiana Talakai | NSW Waratahs | 3 |
| Bienne Terita | Australian Sevens | new cap |
| Melanie Wilks | Queensland Reds | new cap |
| Ivania Wong | Queensland Reds | 3 |

=== New Zealand ===
On 2 August, head coach Wayne Smith named a 33-player squad for the 2022 Laurie O'Reilly Cup.

Head coach: (New Zealand) Wayne Smith

| Player | Position | Age | Super Club | Province | Caps |
|---|---|---|---|---|---|
| Luka Connor | Hooker | 25 | Chiefs Manawa | Bay of Plenty | 6 |
| Natalie Delamere | Hooker | 25 | Matatū | Bay of Plenty | 1 |
| Georgia Ponsonby | Hooker | 22 | Matatū | Canterbury | 5 |
| Tanya Kalounivale | Prop | 23 | Chiefs Manawa | Waikato | 2 |
| Pip Love | Prop | 32 | Matatū | Canterbury | 17 |
| Krystal Murray | Prop | 29 | Blues | Northland | 3 |
| Amy Rule | Prop | 22 | Matatū | Canterbury | 5 |
| Awhina Tangen-Wainohu | Prop | 24 | Chiefs Manawa | Waikato | new cap |
| Santo Taumata | Prop | 19 | Chiefs Manawa | Bay of Plenty | new cap |
| Chelsea Bremner | Lock | 27 | Matatū | Canterbury | 3 |
| Joanah Ngan-Woo | Lock | 26 | Hurricanes Poua | Wellington | 8 |
| Maiakawanakaulani Roos | Lock | 21 | Blues | Auckland | 6 |
| Alana Bremner | Loose forward | 25 | Matatū | Canterbury | 6 |
| Tafito Lafaele | Loose forward | 21 | Blues | Auckland | 2 |
| Charmaine McMenamin | Loose forward | 32 | Blues | Auckland | 25 |
| Kaipo Olsen-Baker | Loose forward | 19 | Hurricanes Poua | Manawatu | 2 |
| Kendra Reynolds | Loose forward | 29 | Matatū | Bay of Plenty | 3 |
| Kennedy Simon | Loose forward | 25 | Chiefs Manawa | Waikato | 8 |
| Ariana Bayler | Halfback | 25 | Chiefs Manawa | Waikato | 4 |
| Kendra Cocksedge | Halfback | 34 | Matatū | Canterbury | 60 |
| Arihiana Marino-Tauhinu | Halfback | 30 | Chiefs Manawa | Counties Manukau | 8 |
| Sylvia Brunt | Inside Back | 18 | – | Auckland | 2 |
| Ruahei Demant | Inside Back | 27 | Blues | Auckland | 15 |
| Amy du Plessis | Inside Back | 23 | Matatū | Canterbury | 2 |
| Theresa Fitzpatrick | Inside Back | 27 | Blues | Auckland | 11 |
| Chelsea Semple | Inside Back | 29 | Chiefs Manawa | Waikato | 28 |
| Victoria Subritzky-Nafatali | Inside Back | 30 | – | Otago | 19 |
| Hazel Tubic | Inside Back | 31 | Chiefs Manawa | Counties Manukau | 14 |
| Renee Holmes | Outside Back | 22 | Matatū | Waikato | 3 |
| Ayesha Leti-I'iga | Outside Back | 23 | Hurricanes Poua | Wellington | 15 |
| Tyla Nathan-Wong | Outside Back | 28 | Blues | Northland | new cap |
| Grace Steinmetz | Outside Back | 24 | Matatū | Canterbury | 0 |
| Ruby Tui | Outside Back | 30 | Chiefs Manawa | Counties Manukau | 2 |

== Broadcast ==
All the O’Reilly Cup matches were broadcast live on Sky.
