= 2023 Laurie O'Reilly Cup =

2023 rugby union competition

Tournament details
- Date: 29 June & 30 September
- Countries: Australia; New Zealand
- Teams: 2

Tournament statistics
- Matches played: 2
- Tries scored: 15 (7.5 per match)
- Top scorer(s): Sylvia Brunt (15)
- Most tries: Sylvia Brunt (3)

The 2023 Laurie O'Reilly Cup was the 14th edition of the rugby union competition. Australia hosted the Black Ferns in the first O’Reilly Cup match on 29 June in Brisbane, it also doubled as a Pacific Four Series test. The second match took place in Hamilton, New Zealand on 30 September.

The Black Ferns retained the O’Reilly Cup after winning both tests.

== Table ==
Pos.	Nation	Games				Points			Tries	
Pos.	Nation	Played	Won	Drawn	Lost	For	Against	Diff.	For	Against
1	New Zealand	2	2	0	0	93	3	+90	15	0
2	Australia	2	0	0	2	3	93	–90	0	15

== Fixtures ==
=== Test 1 ===
29 June 2023
19:00 AEST (UTC+10)

Australia	0–50	New Zealand
		Try: Mererangi Paul (2); Sylvia Brunt (2); Tanya Kalounivale; Chelsea Bremner; Alana Bremner; Iritana Hohaia; Con: Renee Holmes (4/6); Tenika Willison (1/2)

Kayo Stadium, Brisbane
Referee: Aimee Barrett-Theron (SARU)

FB	15	Faitala Moleka
RW	14	Maya Stewart
OC	13	Georgina Friedrichs
IC	12	Cecilia Smith
LW	11	Ivania Wong
FH	10	Carys Dallinger
SH	9	Layne Morgan
N8	8	Grace Hamilton
OF	7	Ashley Marsters
BF	6	Kaitlan Leaney
RL	5	Annabelle Codey
LL	4	Michaela Leonard (c)
TP	3	Eva Karpani
HK	2	Tania Naden
LP	1	Bree-Anna Cheatham
Replacements:
HK	16	Madison Schuck
PR	17	Emily Robinson
PR	18	Bridie O'Gorman
LK	19	Sera Naiqama
N8	20	Emily Chancellor
SH	21	Jasmin Huriwai
CE	22	Arabella McKenzie
FB	23	Alana Elisaia
Coach:
(Australia) Jay Tregonning

FB	15	Renee Holmes
RW	14	Mererangi Paul
OC	13	Amy du Plessis
IC	12	Sylvia Brunt
LW	11	Katelyn Vaha'akolo
FH	10	Ruahei Demant (cc)
SH	9	Arihiana Marino-Tauhinu
N8	8	Liana Mikaele-Tu'u
OF	7	Kennedy Simon (cc)
BF	6	Alana Bremner
RL	5	Chelsea Bremner
LL	4	Maia Roos
TP	3	Tanya Kalounivale
HK	2	Georgia Ponsonby
LP	1	Kate Henwood
Replacements:
HK	16	Luka Connor
PR	17	Krystal Murray
PR	18	Amy Rule
LK	19	Joanah Ngan-Woo
N8	20	Kendra Reynolds
SH	21	Iritana Hohaia
CE	22	Rosie Kelly
FB	23	Tenika Willison
Coach:
(New Zealand) Allan Bunting

Player of the Match:

Assistant referees:
Amber McLachlan (Australia)
Natarsha Ganley (New Zealand)
Television match official:

Notes:

- Rosie Kelly, Tenika Willison, Kate Henwood, Mererangi Paul, Iritana Hohaia and Katelyn Vaha’akolo of the Black Ferns made their international debuts.

=== Test 2 ===
30 September 2023
17:35 NZDT (UTC+13)

New Zealand	43–3	Australia
Try: Krystal Murray 10'; Patricia Maliepo 19'; Katelyn Vaha'akolo (2) 28', 33'; Sylvia Brunt 38'; Lucy Jenkins 76'; Martha Mataele 80'; Con: Ruahei Demant (3/5) 11', 20', 40'; Rosie Kelly (1/2) 77'		Pen: Carys Dallinger 42'

Waikato Stadium, Hamilton
Referee: Kat Roche (USA)

FB	15	Patricia Maliepo
RW	14	Mererangi Paul
OC	13	Amy du Plessis
IC	12	Sylvia Brunt
LW	11	Katelyn Vaha'akolo
FH	10	Ruahei Demant
SH	9	Arihiana Marino-Tauhinu
N8	8	Liana Mikaele-Tu'u
OF	7	Kennedy Simon
BF	6	Alana Bremner
RL	5	Charmaine Smith
LL	4	Maiakawanakaulani Roos
TP	3	Amy Rule
HK	2	Georgia Ponsonby
LP	1	Krystal Murray
Replacements:
HK	16	Luka Connor
PR	17	Chryss Viliko
PR	18	Tanya Kalounivale
LK	19	Lucy Jenkins
N8	20	Layla Sae
SH	21	Iritana Hohaia
CE	22	Rosie Kelly
FB	23	Martha Mataele
Coach:
(New Zealand) Allan Bunting

FB	15	Lori Cramer
RW	14	Maya Stewart
OC	13	Georgina Friedrichs
IC	12	Trilleen Pomare
LW	11	Ivania Wong
FH	10	Carys Dallinger
SH	9	Layne Morgan
N8	8	Ashley Marsters
OF	7	Emily Chancellor
BF	6	Kaitlan Leaney
RL	5	Michaela Leonard (c)
LL	4	Sera Naiqama
TP	3	Eva Karpani
HK	2	Adiana Talakai
LP	1	Bree-Anna Cheatham
Replacements:
HK	16	Tania Naden
PR	17	Emily Robinson
PR	18	Bridie O'Gorman
LK	19	Leilani Nathan
N8	20	Tabua Tuinakauvadra
SH	21	Jasmin Huriwai
CE	22	Cecilia Smith
FB	23	Faitala Moleka
Coach:
(Australia) Jay Tregonning

Player of the Match:

Assistant referees:
Natarsha Ganley (New Zealand)
Tyler Miller (Australia)
Television match official:

Aaron Paterson (New Zealand)

Notes:

- Chryss Viliko, Layla Sae and Martha Mataele made their Black Ferns test debuts.
- Leilani Nathan of the Wallaroos also made her debut.

== Squads ==
=== Australia ===
Wallaroos coach, Jay Tregonning, confirmed a 31-player squad for the Pacific Four Series and O'Reilly Cup.

Player	Age	Club	Caps
Adiana Talakai	24	NSW Waratahs	10
Alana Elisaia	29	Queensland Reds	2
Annabelle Codey	26	Queensland Reds	3
Arabella McKenzie	24	Harlequins	15
Ashley Marsters	29	Melbourne Rebels	20
Bree-Anna Cheatham	26	Queensland Reds	2
Bridie O'Gorman	24	NSW Waratahs	12
Carys Dallinger	23	Queensland Reds	1
Cecilia Smith	29	Queensland Reds	6
Desirée Miller	21	NSW Waratahs	uncapped
Emily Chancellor	31	Harlequins	16
Emily Robinson	30	NSW Waratahs	19
Eva Karpani	26	NSW Waratahs	14
Faitala Moleka	18	ACT Brumbies	1
Georgina Friedrichs	28	NSW Waratahs	12
Grace Hamilton	31	NSW Waratahs	26
Ivania Wong	25	Queensland Reds	8
Jasmin Huriwai	29	ACT Brumbies	1
Kaitlan Leaney	22	Harlequins	8
Layne Morgan	24	NSW Waratahs	12
Leilani Nathan	22	NSW Waratahs	uncapped
Lori Cramer	30	Exeter Chiefs	15
Madison Schuck	31	Queensland Reds	5
Maya Stewart	23	NSW Waratahs	2
Michaela Leonard	28	Western Force	15
Piper Duck (c)	22	NSW Waratahs	10
Sera Naiqama	27	NSW Waratahs	7
Siokapesi Palu	28	ACT Brumbies	2
Tabua Tuinakauvadra	20	ACT Brumbies	1
Tania Naden	31	ACT Brumbies	3
Trilleen Pomare	30	Western Force	21

=== New Zealand ===
Black Ferns Director of Rugby, Allan Bunting, named a 30-player squad to compete in the Pacific Four Series and O’Reilly Cup.

Player	Position	Test Caps	Super Club	Province	Age
Kate Henwood	Loosehead Prop	new cap	Chiefs Manawa	Bay of Plenty	34
Krystal Murray	Loosehead Prop	9	Hurricanes Poua	Northland	29
Philippa Love	Loosehead Prop	25	Matatū	Canterbury	33
Georgia Ponsonby	Hooker	13	Matatū	Canterbury	22
Grace Gago	Hooker	new cap	Blues	Counties Manukau	25
Luka Connor	Hooker	14	Chiefs Manawa	Bay of Plenty	26
Amy Rule	Tighthead Prop	12	Matatū	Canterbury	22
Esther Faiaoga-Tilo	Tighthead Prop	new cap	Blues	Waikato	28
Tanya Kalounivale	Tighthead Prop	6	Chiefs Manawa	Waikato	23
Chelsea Bremner	Lock	12	Matatū	Canterbury	27
Joanah Ngan-Woo	Lock	17	Hurricanes Poua	Wellington	26
Maiakawanakaulani Roos	Lock	14	Blues	Auckland	21
Alana Bremner	Loose Forward	13	Matatū	Canterbury	26
Kendra Reynolds	Loose Forward	9	Matatū	Bay of Plenty	29
Kennedy Simon (cc)	Loose Forward	13	Chiefs Manawa	Waikato	25
Liana Mikaele-Tu'u	Loose Forward	11	Blues	Auckland	20
Lucy Jenkins	Loose Forward	new cap	Matatū	Canterbury	22
Arihiana Marino-Tauhinu	Scrum-half	11	Chiefs Manawa	Counties Manukau	30
Iritana Hohaia	Scrum-half	new cap	Hurricanes Poua	Taranaki	23
Rosie Kelly	First Five-Eighths	new cap	Matatū	Canterbury	23
Ruahei Demant (cc)	First Five-Eighths	27	Blues	Auckland	27
Amy du Plessis	Midfield	7	Matatū	Canterbury	23
Grace Brooker	Midfield	3	Matatū	Canterbury	24
Kelsey Teneti	Midfield	1	—	Waikato	20
Sylvia Brunt	Midfield	7	Blues	Auckland	19
Ayesha Leti-I'iga	Outside Back	21	Hurricanes Poua	Wellington	24
Katelyn Vaha'akolo	Outside Back	new cap	Blues	Auckland	23
Mererangi Paul	Outside Back	new cap	Chiefs Manawa	Counties Manukau	24
Renee Holmes	Outside Back	10	Matatū	Waikato	23
Tenika Willison	Outside Back	new cap	Chiefs Manawa	Waikato	25

== See also ==
- 2023 Pacific Four Series
