= Australia women at the Rugby World Cup =

The Australian women's national rugby union team, also known as the Wallaroos, did not compete in the first two Rugby World Cups in 1991 and 1994. They made their first World Cup appearance in 1998, in the Netherlands, and finished in fifth place. The Wallaroos have competed in every tournament since their debut. They made the semi-finals for the first time in 2010 and finished with their best result of third place after defeating France (22-8) in the bronze medal match.

Australia will host their first Women's Rugby World Cup in 2029.

== By position ==
Rugby World Cup
Year	Round	Pos	GP	W	D	L	PF	PA
(Wales) 1991	Did not enter							
(Scotland) 1994	Did not enter							
(Netherlands) 1998	Plate final	5th	5	3	0	2	84	70
(Spain) 2002	Fifth play-off	5th	4	3	0	1	80	41
(Canada) 2006	Plate semi-final	7th	5	2	0	3	114	89
(England) 2010	Third play-off	Third	5	3	0	2	115	38
(France) 2014	Plate semi-final	7th	5	3	0	2	104	49
(Ireland) 2017	Fifth play-off	6th	5	2	0	3	94	149
(New Zealand) 2021	Quarter-final	5th*	4	2	0	2	49	101
(England) 2025	Quarter-final	—	4	1	1	2	116	124
(Australia) 2029	Automatically qualified as host							
(United States) 2033	TBD							
Total	7/9	3rd^{†}	37	19	1	17	756	661
Champion Runner-up Third place Fourth: * Tied placing ^{†} Best placing / Home venue

== 1998 Rugby World Cup ==
2 May 1998

Australia	21–0	Ireland

Amsterdam

5 May 1998

Australia	8–10	France

Amsterdam

Team	Won	Drawn	Lost	For	Against	Ladder
France	2	0	0	33	14	4th
Australia	1	0	1	29	10	5th
Kazakhstan	1	0	1	18	29	12th
Ireland	0	0	2	6	33	13th

=== Knockout stage ===
9 May 1998

Australia	13–30	England

Amsterdam

12 May 1998

Australia	17–15	Spain

Amsterdam

16 May 1998

Australia	25–15	Scotland

Amsterdam

== 2002 Rugby World Cup ==
13 May 2002

Australia	30–0	Wales

Sant Boi de Llobregat, Barcelona

18 May 2002

Australia	3–36	New Zealand

Cornellà de Llobregat, Barcelona

Position	Nation	Games				Points		Table points	Overall ranking
Position	Nation	played	won	drawn	lost	for	against	Table points	Overall ranking
1	New Zealand	2	2	0	0	153	3	6	1st
2	Australia	2	1	0	1	33	36	4	8th
3	Wales	2	1	0	1	77	30	4	9th
4	Germany	2	0	0	2	0	194	2	16th

=== Knockout stage ===
21 May 2002

Australia	17–5	United States

Girona, Barcelona

25 May 2002

Australia	30–0	Scotland

Girona, Barcelona

== 2006 Rugby World Cup ==
31 August 2006

Australia	68–12	South Africa

Ellerslie Rugby Park, Edmonton

4 September 2006

Australia	10–24	France

Ellerslie Rugby Park, Edmonton

8 September 2006

Australia	6–10	United States

Ellerslie Rugby Park, Edmonton

Pool B ⇔ Pool C

Pool	Team	Won	Drawn	Lost	For	Against	Points
B	England	3	0	0	119	16	14
C	France	2	0	1	75	37	10
C	United States	2	0	1	34	35	9
B	Australia	1	0	2	88	42	6
B	Ireland	1	0	2	48	67	5
C	South Africa	0	0	3	20	179	0

=== Knockout stage ===
12 September 2006

Australia	12–29	United States

St. Albert Rugby Park, St. Albert

16 September 2006

Australia	18–14	Ireland

Ellerslie Rugby Park, Edmonton

== 2010 Rugby World Cup ==
20 August 2010

Australia	26–12	Wales

Surrey Sports Park, Guildford, South East England

24 August 2010

Australia	5–32	New Zealand

Surrey Sports Park, Guildford, South East England

28 August 2010

Australia	62–0	South Africa

Surrey Sports Park, Guildford, South East England

Po	Nation	Pl	Wo	Dr	Lo	Pf	Pa	Pd	Tf	Ta	Bp	Tp
1	New Zealand	3	3	0	0	128	16	+112	22	2	3	15
2	Australia	3	2	0	1	93	44	+49	14	8	2	10
3	South Africa	3	1	0	2	18	127	−109	3	19	0	4
4	Wales	3	0	0	3	30	82	−52	4	14	1	1

=== Knockout stage ===
1 September 2010

Australia	0–15	England

Twickenham Stoop

5 September 2010

Australia	22–8	France

Twickenham Stoop

== 2014 Rugby World Cup ==
1 August 2014

Australia	26–3	South Africa

CNR, Marcoussis Pitch 1

5 August 2014

Australia	25–3	Wales

CNR, Marcoussis Pitch 2

9 August 2014

Australia	3–17	France

CNR, Marcoussis Pitch 1

Team	Pld	W	D	L	TF	PF	PA	+/−	BP	Pts
France	3	3	0	0	15	98	6	+92	2	14
Australia	3	2	0	1	6	54	23	+31	0	8
Wales	3	1	0	2	4	38	54	−16	1	5
South Africa	3	0	0	3	0	9	116	−107	0	0

=== Knockout stage ===
13 August 2014

Australia	20–23	United States

CNR, Marcoussis Pitch 1

17 August 2014

Australia	30–3	Wales

CNR, Marcoussis Pitch 1

== 2017 Rugby World Cup ==
9 August 2017

Australia	17–19	Ireland

UCD Bowl, Dublin

13 August 2017

Australia	0–48	France

UCD Bowl, Dublin

17 August 2017

Australia	29–15	Japan

Billings Park UCD, Dublin

Team	Pld	W	D	L	TF	PF	PA	+/−	BP	Pts
France	3	3	0	0	23	141	19	+122	2	14
Ireland	3	2	0	1	7	48	52	−4	0	8
Australia	3	1	0	2	8	46	82	−36	2	6
Japan	3	0	0	3	7	43	125	−82	0	0

=== Knockout stage ===
22 August 2017

Australia	36–24	Ireland

Kingspan Stadium, Belfast

26 August 2017

Australia	12–43	Canada

Queen's University Belfast

== 2021 Rugby World Cup ==
8 October 2022

Australia	17–41	New Zealand

Eden Park, Auckland

15 October 2022

Australia	14–12	Scotland

Northland Events Centre, Whangārei

22 October 2022

Australia	13–7	Wales

Northland Events Centre, Whangārei

Pos	Team	Pld	W	D	L	PF	PA	PD	T	B	Pts
1	New Zealand	3	3	0	0	154	29	+125	26	3	15
2	Australia	3	2	0	1	44	60	−16	6	0	8
3	Wales	3	1	0	2	37	84	−47	5	1	5
4	Scotland	3	0	0	3	27	89	−62	5	2	2

=== Knockout stage ===
30 October 2022

Australia	5–41	England

Waitakere Stadium, Auckland

== 2025 Rugby World Cup ==
23 August 2025

(1 BP) Australia	73–0	Samoa

Salford Community Stadium, Manchester

30 August 2025

(1 BP) United States	31–31	Australia (1 BP)

York Community Stadium, York

6 September 2025

(1 BP) England	47–7	Australia

Brighton & Hove Albion Stadium, Brighton

Pos	Team	Pld	W	D	L	PF	PA	PD	TF	TA	TB	LB	Pts	
1	England (H)	3	3	0	0	208	17	+191	32	2	3	0	15	Advance to knockout stage
2	Australia	3	1	1	1	111	78	+33	17	12	2	0	8	Advance to knockout stage
3	United States	3	1	1	1	98	100	−2	16	16	2	0	8	
4	Samoa	3	0	0	3	3	225	−222	0	35	0	0	0	

Source: World Rugby
(H) Host

=== Knockout stage ===
13 September 2025

Canada	46–5	Australia

Ashton Gate Stadium, Bristol

== Overall record ==
Overall record against all nations in the World Cup:

Country	P	W	D	L	PF	PA	±	Win %
Canada	2	0	0	2	17	89	–72	0%
England	4	0	0	4	25	133	–108	0%
France	5	1	0	4	43	107	–64	20%
Japan	1	1	0	0	29	15	+14	100%
Ireland	4	3	0	1	92	57	+35	75%
New Zealand	3	0	0	3	25	109	–84	0%
Samoa	1	1	0	0	73	0	+73	100%
Scotland	3	3	0	0	69	27	+42	100%
South Africa	3	3	0	0	156	15	+141	100%
Spain	1	1	0	0	17	15	+2	100%
United States	5	1	1	3	86	98	–12	20%
Wales	5	5	0	0	124	25	+99	100%
Total	37	19	1	17	756	690	+66	51.35%
