= Sarah Bonar =

Scottish rugby union player (born 1994)

- Born: 9 February 1994 (age 32) Aberdeen
- Height: 180 cm (5 ft 11 in)
- Weight: 77 kg (170 lb; 12 st 2 lb)

Rugby union career
- Position: Lock
Senior career
Years	Team	Apps	(Points)
2017–2020	Loughborough Lightning	24	(20)
2020–2021	Gloucester-Hartpury	4	(10)
2021–	Harlequins	41	(15)
- Correct as of 2 July 2025
International career
Years	Team	Apps	(Points)
2016–	Scotland	51	(25)
- Correct as of 26 September 2025

Sarah Bonar (born 9 February 1994) is a Scottish international rugby union player. She plays as a Lock. She has 50 caps for the Scotland women's national rugby union team.

== Personal life ==
Bonar graduated from Loughborough University. She serves in the Royal Air Force, and also teaches geography.

== Rugby career ==
Bonar competed at the 2017, 2020, and 2022 Six Nations Championship's. In September 2022, she competed at the delayed 2021 Rugby World Cup which took place in New Zealand.

At the club level, she plays for Harlequins. She was named in Scotland's squad for the 2025 Six Nations Championship. She also made the Scottish side for the Women's Rugby World Cup in England.
