= Arihiana Marino-Tauhinu =

- Born: 29 March 1992 (age 34) Kawakawa, New Zealand
- Height: 1.61 m (5 ft 3 in)
- Weight: 74 kg (163 lb)

Rugby union career
- Position: Halfback
Provincial / State sides
Years	Team	Apps	(Points)
2013–Present	Counties Manukau	69	(250)
2011–2012	Auckland	9	(10)
Super Rugby
Years	Team	Apps	(Points)
2021–2024	Chiefs Manawa	16	(10)
International career
Years	Team	Apps	(Points)
2019–	New Zealand	20	(12)
Medal record
Representing New Zealand
Women's rugby union
Rugby World Cup
Gold medal – first place	2021 New Zealand	Team competition

Arihiana Marino-Tauhinu (born 29 March 1992) is a New Zealand rugby union player. She was part of the Black Ferns team that won the 2021 Rugby World Cup. She also plays for Chiefs Manawa in the Super Rugby Aupiki competition.

== Personal life ==
Marino-Tauhinu is from the Te Uri Taniwha, Ngāti Hineira, Ngāpuhi and Ngai Tāhuhu iwi. She has played for the Kiwi Ferns, the Aotearoa Maori sevens team and touch rugby at age grade level and for the Maori.

== Rugby career ==
=== 2011–17 ===
Marino-Tauhinu played for Auckland in 2011 and 2012 before appearing for Counties Manukau when they rejoined the Farah Palmer Cup competition in 2013. She made the Black Ferns 2015 and 2017 squads but never played in any games.

=== 2019 ===
In 2019, she was offered a Black Ferns contract and featured in all of their six test matches. She made her international debut for New Zealand on 28 June 2019 against Canada at San Diego. She later appeared for the Black Ferns Development XV's team that took part in the Oceania Rugby Women's Championship in Fiji.

=== 2021 ===
In May 2021 she was Chiefs halfback in their historic match against the Blues in the first-ever women's Super Rugby match at Eden Park. In November that year she officially joined the Chiefs for the inaugural Super Rugby Aupiki season for 2022.

=== 2022 ===
Marino-Tauhinu was named in the Black Ferns squad for the 2022 Pacific Four Series. She scored her first international test try against the United States in the Pacific series. She was reselected for the team for the August test series against the Wallaroos for the Laurie O'Reilly Cup.

Marino-Tauhinu was selected for the Black Ferns 2021 Rugby World Cup 32-player squad.

=== 2023 ===
Marino-Tauhinu was named in the Black Ferns squad, for the Pacific Four Series and O’Reilly Cup. In July, she started in her sides 21–52 victory over Canada at the Pacific Four Series in Ottawa.
