= Bienne Terita =

Australia international rugby union player

- Born: 16 May 2003 (age 23) Sydney
- Height: 1.7 m (5 ft 7 in)
- Weight: 83 kg (183 lb)
- School: SEDA College NSW

Rugby union career
- Position: Wing
Super Rugby
Years	Team	Apps	(Points)
2025	ACT Brumbies		(0)
International career
Years	Team	Apps	(Points)
2022	Australia	1	(10)
National sevens team
Years	Team		Comps
2022	Australia		2

Bienne Terita (born 16 May 2003) is an Australian rugby union and sevens player. She competed for Australia at the delayed 2021 Rugby World Cup in New Zealand and for the Australian women's sevens team at the 2024 Summer Olympics.

== Rugby career ==
Terita captained the Australian Youth Sevens team at the 2019 World Schools Sevens tournament in New Zealand. She was also named MVP of the tournament.

Terita was named in the Australian sevens team for the 2021–22 Sevens Series. She made her senior debut for Australia at the 2022 Spain Sevens in Málaga. She featured at the Canadian Sevens in Langford, British Columbia. She scored a try in her sides 58–0 victory over Mexico. She played at the France Sevens in Toulouse. She helped her side beat South Africa 50–0 in their opening match.

Terita missed out on selection for the Commonwealth Games so she made a move to fifteens with the World Cup in sight. She was named in the Australian squad for a two-test series against the Black Ferns for the O'Reilly Cup. She was named in the starting line-up in the second test against New Zealand and made her debut on 27 August 2022 in Adelaide. Terita scored two tries on debut.

Terita was selected in the Wallaroos side again for the delayed 2022 Rugby World Cup in New Zealand.

In 2024, She was selected in the Australian women's sevens side for the Summer Olympics in Paris. She joined the ACT Brumbies for the 2025 Super Rugby Women's season.
