= Tanya Kalounivale =

NZ international rugby union player (born 1999)

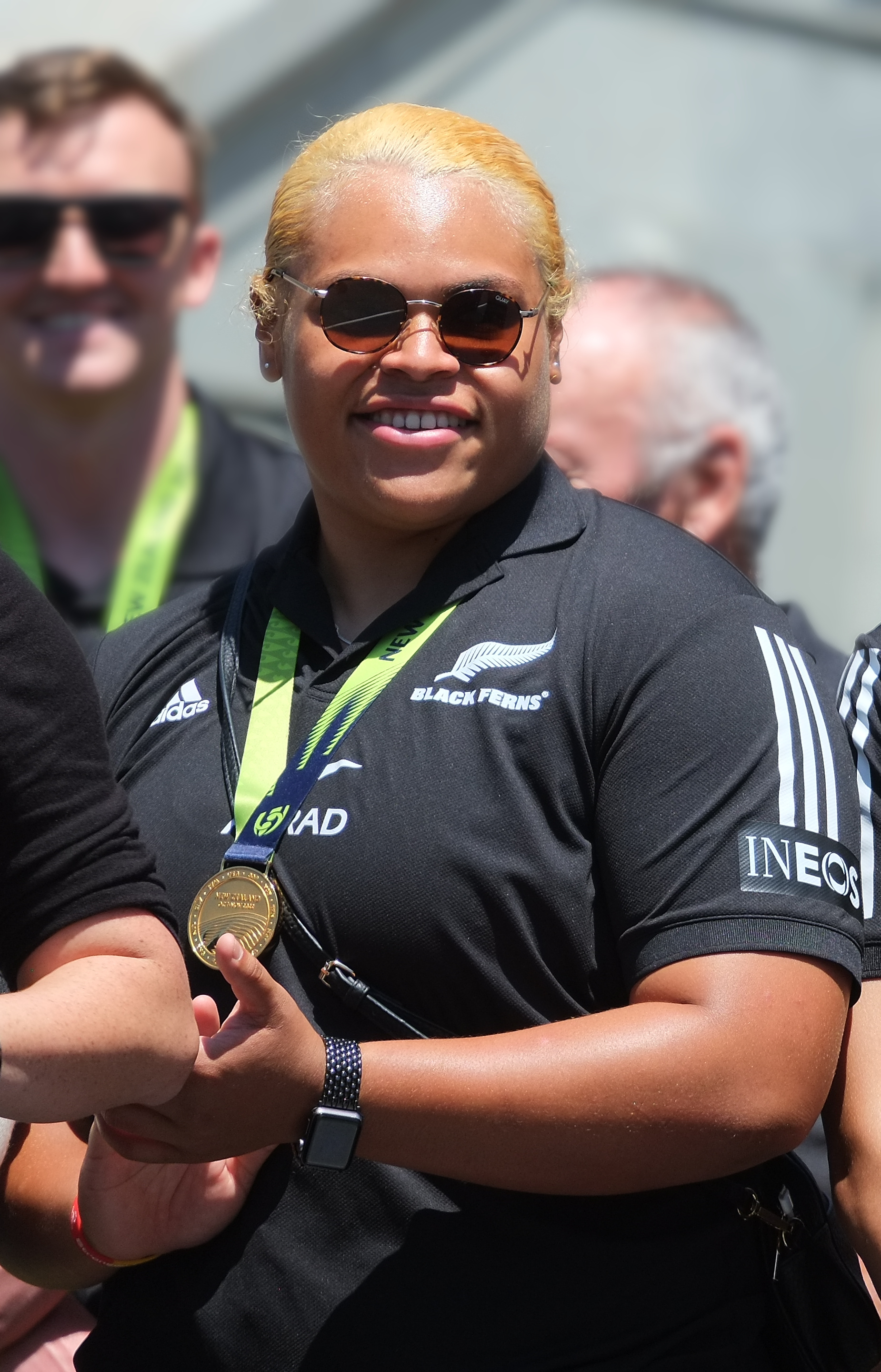
- Kalounivale in 2022
- Born: 20 January 1999 (age 27) Fiji
- Height: 1.78 m (5 ft 10 in)
- Weight: 129 kg (20 st 4 lb)

Rugby union career
- Position: Prop
Provincial / State sides
Years	Team	Apps	(Points)
2017–2023	Waikato	32	(35)
Super Rugby
Years	Team	Apps	(Points)
2021–	Chiefs Manawa	17	(20)
International career
Years	Team	Apps	(Points)
2022–	New Zealand	27	(15)
Medal record
Representing New Zealand
Women's rugby union
Rugby World Cup
Gold medal – first place	2021 New Zealand	Team competition
Bronze medal – third place	2025 England	Team competition

Tanya Kalounivale (born 20 January 1999) is a Fijian-born New Zealand rugby union player. She plays at tighthead prop for Waikato and Manurewa Rugby Football Club. She was part of the Black Ferns champion 2021 Rugby World Cup squad. She plays for Chiefs Manawa in the Super Rugby Aupiki competition.

== Rugby career ==
Kalounivale attended Suva Grammar School in Fiji. She made her debut for Waikato in 2017.

In May 2021, Kalounivale played for the Chiefs against the Blues in the first-ever women's Super Rugby match at Eden Park, the Chiefs won 39–12. In November, she was named in the Chiefs squad for the inaugural season of Super Rugby Aupiki.

Kalounivale was selected for the Black Ferns squad to tour England and France, although she did not play in any matches.

She made her international debut on 6 June against Australia at Tauranga at the 2022 Pacific Four Series. She scored a try on debut which was later ruled out.

In August, She was named in the team again for a two-test series against the Wallaroos for the Laurie O'Reilly Cup. She was selected for the Black Ferns 2021 Rugby World Cup 32-player squad.

In 2023, Kalounivale scored her first Super Rugby Aupiki try in Chiefs Manawa's opening round victory against Hurricanes Poua. She scored two tries in her sides Super Rugby Aupiki final loss to Matatū.

In June 2023, she made the selection for the Black Ferns 30-player squad to compete in the Pacific Four Series and O’Reilly Cup. She featured in her sides 21–52 victory over Canada at the Pacific Series in Ottawa in July.

In July 2025, she was named in the Black Ferns side to the Women's Rugby World Cup in England.
