= Emily Chancellor =

Australia international rugby union player (born 1991)

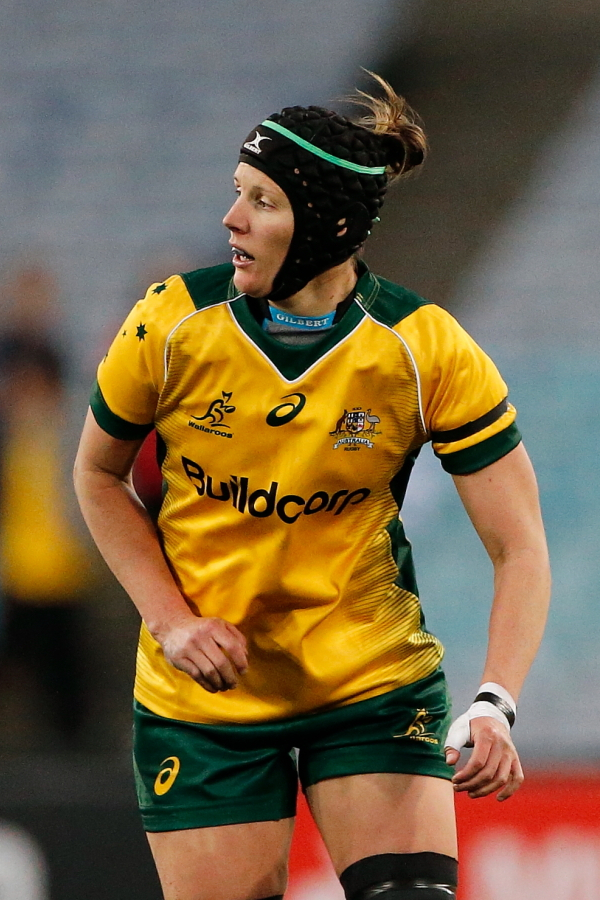
- Emily Chancellor in her international debut against New Zealand, August 2018
- Born: 20 August 1991 (age 35) Sydney
- Height: 1.7 m (5 ft 7 in)
- Weight: 73 kg (161 lb)
- School: SCEGGS Darlinghurst

Rugby union career
- Position: Flanker
Senior career
Years	Team	Apps	(Points)
2022–2023	Harlequins		(0)
2023–2024	Mie Pearls		(0)
2015–Present	Sydney University F.C.		(0)
Super Rugby
Years	Team	Apps	(Points)
2019–Present	NSW Waratahs	26	(20)
International career
Years	Team	Apps	(Points)
2018–Present	Australia	34	(10)

Emily Chancellor (born 20 August 1991) is an Australian rugby union player. She plays in the loose forwards for Australia internationally, and for the NSW Waratahs in the Super W competition. She competed for Australia at the delayed 2021 Rugby World Cup; she then joined Harlequins in the Premier 15s.

== Rugby career ==
=== 2018 ===
Chancellor made her international debut for the Wallaroos on 18 August 2018 against New Zealand in a Bledisloe double header at the ANZ Stadium in Sydney. She was named Wallaroos Player of Year in 2018.

=== 2022 ===
Chancellor was named in the Australian squad for test matches against Fiji and Japan in May 2022. She was then named in the squad for the 2022 Pacific Four Series. She started against the Black Ferns in the opening match of the Pacific Four series on 6 June.

Chancellor also made the Wallaroos squad for the two-test series against the Black Ferns for the Laurie O'Reilly Cup. She was selected in the team again for the delayed 2022 Rugby World Cup in New Zealand. Following the World Cup, she joined English club, the Harlequins, in the Premier 15s.

=== 2023 ===
Chancellor returned to the Wallaroos side for the 2023 Pacific Four Series, and the O'Reilly Cup.

=== 2024 ===
Chancellor ruptured her ACL in Round 1 of Super Rugby Women's in 2024 and spent the rest of the year rehabbing her injury.

=== 2025 ===
Chancellor made her return for the NSW Waratahs during the preseason fixtures and went on to play all games in the 2025 Super W season with the NSW Waratahs who claimed their 7th Championship title in April. Chancellor returned for the Wallaroos against Fijiana in Suva in May where she was named Vice Captain of the national side.

She was named in the Wallaroos squad for the 2025 Women's Rugby World Cup in England.
