= Tania Naden =

Australia international rugby union player

- Born: 20 February 1992 (age 34) Canberra
- Height: 1.64 m (5 ft 5 in)
- Weight: 83 kg (183 lb)
- School: Erindale College

Rugby union career
- Position: Hooker
Super Rugby
| Years | Team | Apps | (Points) |
| 2018 – present | Brumbies | | (0) |
International career
| Years | Team | Apps | (Points) |
| 2022 – present | Australia | 27 | (10) |

Tania Naden (born 20 February 1992) is an Australian rugby union player. She represents Australia at an international level, and plays for the Brumbies in the Super W competition. With her touch and rugby sevens background, she stands out with her blistering pace and skill.

== Rugby career ==
Naden first played rugby in 2017, she was asked by a friend to play for a local team in Canberra and was hooked from first game.

Naden has been with the Brumbies since the inaugural Super W season in 2018. She spent the 2021 season recovering from an ACL injury she received the year before. She made her first starting appearance in the second round of the 2022 season against the Melbourne Rebels.

In 2022, Naden played for the Australian Barbarians team against Japan, in the latter's Australian tour. She was named in the Wallaroos squad for the Rugby World Cup in New Zealand. She was named on the bench following Ashley Masters suspension and made her international debut against Wales at the World Cup.

Naden was selected again in the Wallaroos side for the 2023 Pacific Four Series, and the O'Reilly Cup. In 2024, she scored a hat-trick for the Brumbies against the Western Force in round five of the regular season.

In August 2025, she was named in the Australia squad for the 2025 Women's Rugby World Cup.
