= Trilleen Pomare =

Australian rugby league and union footballer

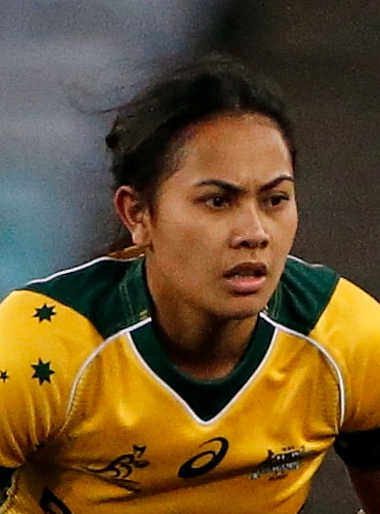
- Pomare playing for Australia against New Zealand, August 2018
- Born: 5 April 1993 (age 33)
- Height: 1.65 m (5 ft 5 in)
- Weight: 69 kg (152 lb)

Rugby union career
- Position: Fly-half
Super Rugby
Years	Team	Apps	(Points)
2018–Present	Western Force	30	(0)
International career
Years	Team	Apps	(Points)
2017–2025	Australia	43	(15)

Trilleen Pomare (born 5 April 1993) is an Australian rugby union player. She competed for Australia at the 2017, 2021 and 2025 Women's Rugby World Cups. She plays at Fly-half for the Wallaroos and the Western Force in Super W.

== Rugby career ==
Pomare made her international debut for Australia against Ireland at the 2017 Women's Rugby World Cup. In 2019 she was selected in the Australian squad that faced Japan in a two test series. She was later named in the squad again for a two-test series against New Zealand.

In 2022, Pomare featured for the Wallaroos in test matches against Fiji and Japan. She was named in Australia's squad for the 2022 Pacific Four Series in New Zealand. She made the Wallaroos squad for a two-test series against the Black Ferns at the Laurie O'Reilly Cup. She was selected in the team again for the delayed 2022 Rugby World Cup in New Zealand.

Pomare made the Wallaroos side for the 2023 Pacific Four Series, and the O'Reilly Cup.

In 2025, she was called into the Wallaroos side for the Women's Rugby World Cup in England. On 15 October, she announced her retirement from international rugby.
