= Adiana Talakai =

Australia international rugby union player

- Born: 24 February 1999 (age 27) Sydney
- Height: 1.75 m (5 ft 9 in)
- Weight: 97 kg (15 st 4 lb)
- School: Our Lady of the Sacred Heart College
- Notable relative(s): Sam Talakai (brother), Chris Talakai (brother)

Rugby union career
- Position: Hooker
Senior career
Years	Team	Apps	(Points)
	NSW Waratahs		(0)
International career
Years	Team	Apps	(Points)
2022–Present	Australia	21	(25)

Adiana Talakai (born 24 February 1999) is an Australian rugby union player. She plays at Hooker for the NSW Waratahs in the Super W competition and for Australia internationally. She was part of Australia's squad that competed at the 2022 Rugby World Cup.

== Rugby career ==
Talakai started on her international debut for Australia against Fiji on 6 May 2022 at the Suncorp Stadium in Brisbane. She came off the bench in her second test appearance against Japan at the Bond Sports Park in the Gold Coast on 10 May.

Talakai was named in the squad for the 2022 Pacific Four Series. She started against the Black Ferns in the opening match of the Pacific Four series on 6 June. She was named in the Wallaroos squad for a two-test series against the Black Ferns at the Laurie O'Reilly Cup.

Talakai made the Wallaroos side again for the delayed 2022 Rugby World Cup in New Zealand.

Talakai was selected in the Wallaroos side for the 2023 Pacific Four Series, and the O'Reilly Cup.

In August 2025, she was named in the Australia squad for the 2025 Women's Rugby World Cup.
