= Iliseva Batibasaga =

- Born: 23 March 1985 (age 41)
- Height: 1.64 m (5 ft 5 in)
- Weight: 68 kg (150 lb)

Rugby union career
- Position: Scrumhalf
Senior career
Years	Team	Apps	(Points)
	Waratahs		(0)
International career
Years	Team	Apps	(Points)
2006–2022	Australia	26	(0)
National sevens team
Years	Team		Comps
- Australia

Iliseva Batibasaga (born 23 March 1985) is a former Fijian-Australian rugby union player. She represented Australia in 27 tests between 2006 and 2022.

Batibasaga was named in the Wallaroos side for the 2006 Rugby World Cup in Canada. She was also a member of the squad to the 2010 Rugby World Cup that finished in third place. She was part of the Australian women's sevens team at the 2013 Sevens World Cup in Moscow.

In 2022, She was named in Australia's squad for the Pacific Four Series in New Zealand. She was also named in the side for the two-test series against the Black Ferns for the O'Reilly Cup.

Batibasaga also made the Wallaroos for the delayed 2022 Rugby World Cup in New Zealand. She announced her retirement from international rugby in December.

== Personal life ==
Batibasaga is a cousin of Nemani Nadolo, Chris Kuridrani, Tevita Kuridrani and former Wallaby Lote Tuqiri. She works as an Early Childhood Teacher.
