= Layne Morgan =

Australia international rugby union & league player (born 1999)

- Born: 20 April 1999 (age 27) Newcastle, NSW
- Height: 1.66 m (5 ft 5 in)
- Weight: 68 kg (10 st 10 lb)
- School: St Paul's Catholic College, Booragul

Rugby union career
- Position: Scrum-half
Super Rugby
Years	Team	Apps	(Points)
2018–2024	NSW Waratahs		(0)
2025	Queensland Reds		(0)
International career
Years	Team	Apps	(Points)
2022–25	Australia	37	(10)
- Rugby league career

Playing information
- Position: Halfback
Club
Years	Team	Pld	T	G	FG	P
2026–	Parramatta Eels	5	0	0	0	0
- As of 13 November 2026

Layne Morgan (born 20 April 1999) is an Australian rugby league, rugby union and sevens player. She currently plays for Parramatta Eels in the NRLW competition.

She has played scrum-half for Australia, and the NSW Waratahs in the Super W competition. She represented the Wallaroos at the 2021 Rugby World Cup.

== Early career ==
Morgan attended St Paul's Catholic College in Booragul, New South Wales. She was selected for the Australian Youth Sevens squad for the 2017 Commonwealth Youth Games in The Bahamas.

== Rugby career ==
On 6 May 2022, she made her international debut for Australia against Fiji. She later played in the test match against Japan.

Morgan was named in Australia's squad for the 2022 Pacific Four Series in New Zealand. She was named in the Wallaroos squad for a two-test series against the Black Ferns at the Laurie O'Reilly Cup. She was selected in the team again for the delayed 2022 Rugby World Cup in New Zealand.

Morgan made the Wallaroos side for the 2023 Pacific Four Series, and the O'Reilly Cup.

She was named in the Wallaroos squad for the 2025 Women's Rugby World Cup in England.

=== 2026 ===
On 23 January 2026 it was reported that she had signed for Parramatta Eels in the NRLW on a 2-year deal
