= Emily Robinson (rugby union, born 1993) =

Australia international rugby union player

- Born: 6 February 1993 (age 33)
- Height: 1.67 m (5 ft 6 in)
- Weight: 85 kg (187 lb)

Rugby union career
- Position: Prop
Super Rugby
Years	Team	Apps	(Points)
2018–	NSW Waratahs	33	(0)
International career
Years	Team	Apps	(Points)
2016–present	Australia	19	(0)

Emily Robinson (born 6 February 1993) is an Australian rugby union player. She competed for Australia at the 2017 and 2021 Rugby World Cup's. She plays for the NSW Waratahs in the Super Rugby Women's competition.

== Rugby career ==
Robinson made her international debut for Australia against New Zealand in 2016. She was selected to represent Australia at the 2017 Rugby World Cup in Ireland.

She was a member of the NSW Waratahs inaugural 2018 and 2019 Super W winning sides. She sustained a neck injury during training and was ruled out for the 2020 Super W season.

In 2022, She was named in the Wallaroos squad for a two-test series against the Black Ferns at the Laurie O'Reilly Cup. Robinson was selected in the Wallaroos side again for the delayed 2021 Rugby World Cup in New Zealand.

She made the Wallaroos squad for the 2023 Pacific Four Series, and the O'Reilly Cup.

In 2025, she scored a try in the Waratahs victory over the Queensland Reds as they claimed their sixth Super Rugby Women's title.
