= Ivania Wong =

Australia international rugby union & PNG international rugby league player

- Born: 23 September 1997 (age 29) Rabaul, Papua New Guinea
- Height: 1.53 m (5 ft 0 in)
- Weight: 63 kg (9 st 13 lb)
- School: Balmoral State High School

Rugby union career
- Position: Wing
Senior career
Years	Team	Apps	(Points)
	Queensland Reds		(0)
International career
Years	Team	Apps	(Points)
2022	Australia	8	(0)
- Rugby league career

Playing information
- Position: Wing
Representative
Years	Team	Pld	T	G	FG	P
2026	PNG Prime Minister's XIII	1	0	0	0	0
2026	Papua New Guinea	2	1	0	0	4

Ivania Wong (born 23 September 1997) is a Papua New Guinea-born Australian rugby union & rugby league player. She plays Wing for the Wallaroos internationally and for the Queensland Reds in the Super W competition. She competed for Australia at the delayed 2021 Rugby World Cup.

== Early life and education ==
Wong was born in Rabaul, East New Britain Province, Papua New Guinea. She moved to Brisbane with her parents at the age of eight. Upon moving to Australia, she learned English as a second language and played a variety of sports from primary school to high school.

== Rugby career ==
=== 2022 ===
Wong started in her international debut for Australia against Fiji on 6 May 2022 at the Suncorp Stadium in Brisbane. She also started against Japan in her second test cap for the Wallaroos on 10 May at the Bond Sports Park in the Gold Coast.

Wong was named in the Australian squad for the 2022 Pacific Four Series. She started against the Black Ferns in the opening match of the Pacific Four series on 6 June. She was later named in the Wallaroos squad for a two-test series against the Black Ferns at the Laurie O'Reilly Cup. She was selected in the team again for the delayed 2022 Rugby World Cup in New Zealand.

=== 2023 ===
In the Wallaroos first game of the year, Wong scored the last try in her sides victory over Fiji on 20 May at the Allianz Stadium. She was selected in the Wallaroos side for the 2023 Pacific Four Series, and the O'Reilly Cup.

=== 2026 ===
She made her PNG Prime Minister's XIII début on 3 October 2026 in the 6-66 defeat to Prime Minister's XIII in Port Moresby.

She made her Papua New Guinea international début in the 2026 Rugby League World Cup 58-4 win over France on 17 October 2026, scoring one try.
