= Georgina Friedrichs =

Australian rugby sevens player

- Full name: Georgie Friedrichs
- Born: 14 April 1995 (age 31)
- Height: 1.65 m (5 ft 5 in)
- Weight: 66 kg (146 lb)

Rugby union career
- Position: Centre
Super Rugby
Years	Team	Apps	(Points)
2019	Queensland Reds		(0)
2020–Present	Waratahs		(0)
International career
Years	Team	Apps	(Points)
2022–	Australia	38	(25)
National sevens team
Years	Team		Comps
2016–	Australia		
Medal record
Women's rugby sevens
Representing Australia
Commonwealth Games
Silver medal – second place	2018 Gold Coast	Team

Georgina Friedrichs (born 14 April 1995) is an Australian rugby sevens and union player. She has represented Australia in sevens and fifteens internationally, and competed at the 2021 Rugby World Cup in New Zealand. She also plays for the NSW Waratahs in the Super W competition.

== Early life ==
Friedrichs was born in Zimbabwe and moved with her family to Toowoomba in Queensland when she was eight.

== Rugby career ==
Friedrichs made her debut for the Australian sevens team at the 2016 Canada Sevens in Langford. She was named as a reserve on the sevens team for the 2018 Commonwealth Games. She spent three years on the sevens team before a hip injury sidelined her for several months.

In 2019, She switched to fifteens and made her debut for Queensland Women against the Brumbies in the Super W season.

Friedrichs made her international test debut for the Australian fifteens team on 6 May 2022 against Fiji. She was named in Australia's squad for the 2022 Pacific Four Series in New Zealand. She was also called up to the Wallaroos squad for a two-test series against the Black Ferns at the Laurie O'Reilly Cup.

Friedrichs was selected in the team again for the delayed 2021 Rugby World Cup in New Zealand.

In 2023, she was named as the Wallaroos Player of the Year for 2022. She was selected in the Wallaroos side for the 2023 Pacific Four Series, and the O'Reilly Cup. She scored a try against the USA and featured in her sides loss to Canada.

In 2025, she was called into the Wallaroos side for the Women's Rugby World Cup in England.
