= Sera Naiqama =

Australia international rugby union player

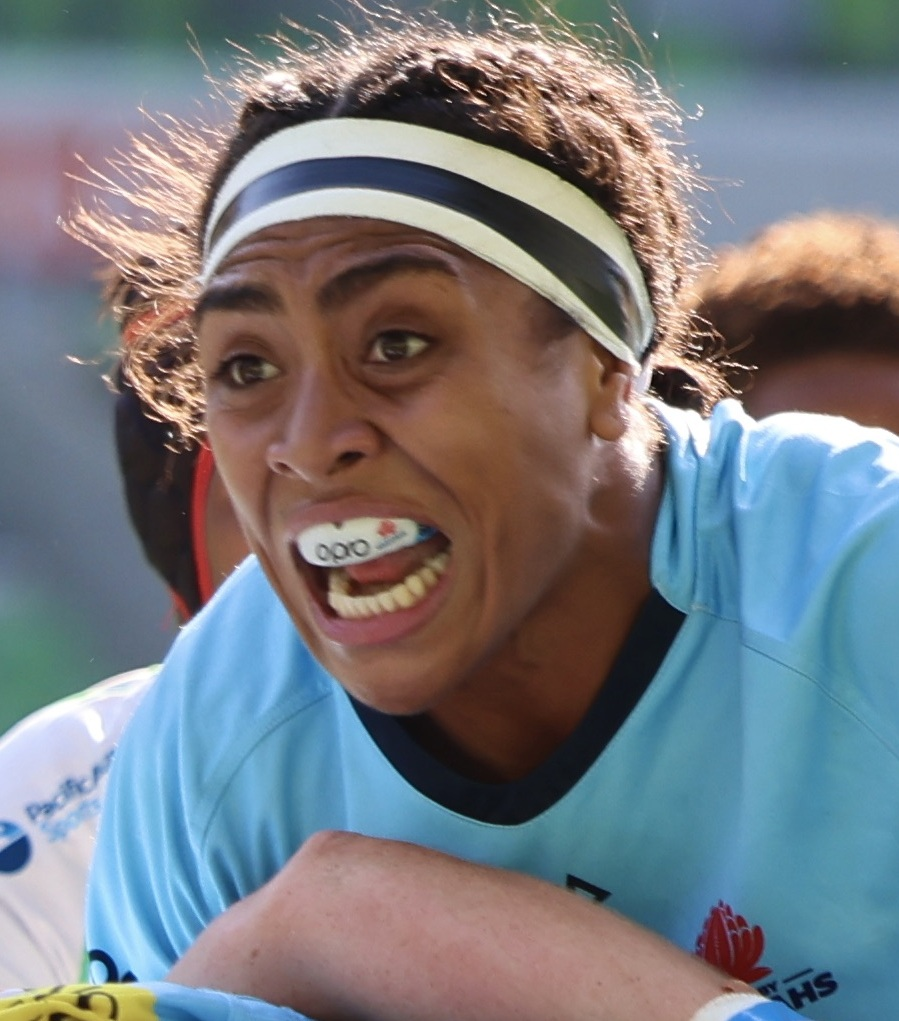
- Born: 26 July 1995 (age 31) Sydney, New South Wales, Australia
- Height: 1.83 m (6 ft 0 in)
- Weight: 82 kg (12 st 13 lb)
- School: Endeavour Sports High School
- Notable relative(s): Kevin Naiqama (brother); Wes Naiqama (brother)

Rugby union career
- Position: Lock
Super Rugby
| Years | Team | Apps | (Points) |
| 2019–2024 | NSW Waratahs | | (0) |
| 2023 | Matatū | 4 | (0) |
| 2025– | Western Force | 0 | (0) |
International career
| Years | Team | Apps | (Points) |
| 2022–2023 | Australia | 13 | (0) |

Sera Naiqama (born 26 July 1995) is an Australian rugby union player. She plays Lock for the Wallaroos at an international level, and for the NSW Waratahs in the Super W competition. She competed for Australia at the delayed 2021 Rugby World Cup.

== Personal life ==
Naiqama is the younger sister of NRL and Fijian rugby league internationals Kevin and Wes Naiqama.

== Rugby career ==
Naiqama debuted for the NSW Waratahs in the Super W competition in 2019. Later in November that year, she played for Australia A against the Black Ferns Development team at the Oceania Rugby Women's Championship in Fiji.

In 2022, she made her test debut for Australia on 6 May against Fiji. She came off the bench in the Wallaroos test match against Japan four days later.

She was named in Australia's squad for the 2022 Pacific Four Series in New Zealand. She was named in the Wallaroos squad for a two-test series against the Black Ferns at the Laurie O'Reilly Cup. She was selected in the team again for the delayed 2021 Rugby World Cup in New Zealand.

Naiqama signed with Matatū for the 2023 Super Rugby Aupiki season. She made the Wallaroos side for the 2023 Pacific Four Series, and the O'Reilly Cup.

In December 2025, she re-signed with the Force for the 2026 Super Rugby Women's season.
