= Bridie O'Gorman =

Australia international rugby union player

- Born: 8 December 1998 (age 27) Sydney
- Height: 1.73 m (5 ft 8 in)
- Weight: 90 kg (198 lb)
- School: Tara Anglican School for Girls

Rugby union career
- Position: Prop
Senior career
Years	Team	Apps	(Points)
	NSW Waratahs	33	(15)
International career
Years	Team	Apps	(Points)
2022–	Australia	37	(5)

Bridie O’Gorman (born 8 December 1998) is an Australian rugby union player. She plays Prop for Australia internationally, and for the NSW Waratahs in the Super W competition. She represented the Wallaroos at the 2021 Rugby World Cup.

== Rugby career ==
O'Gorman made her international debut for Australia against Fiji on 6 May 2022 at the Suncorp Stadium in Brisbane. She also featured against Japan in her second appearance for the Wallaroos a few days later. She was named in the squad for the 2022 Pacific Four Series. She started against the Black Ferns in the opening match of the Pacific Four series on 6 June.

O'Gorman was named in the Wallaroos squad for a two-test series against the Black Ferns at the Laurie O'Reilly Cup. She was selected in the team again for the delayed 2022 Rugby World Cup in New Zealand.

O'Gorman once again, made the Wallaroos side for the 2023 Pacific Four Series, and the O'Reilly Cup.

She was named in the Wallaroos squad for the 2025 Women's Rugby World Cup in England.
