= Theresa Setefano =

New Zealand rugby union player

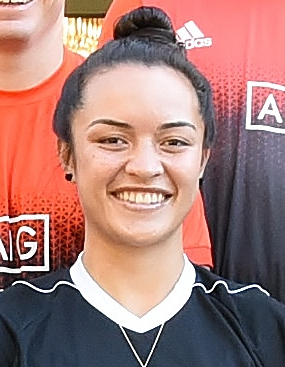
- Setefano in 2017
- Full name: Theresa Matauaina Fitzpatrick
- Born: 25 February 1995 (age 31)
- Height: 168 cm (5 ft 6 in)
- Weight: 75 kg (165 lb)
- Notable relative: Sulu Fitzpatrick (sister)

Rugby union career
- Position: Centre
Provincial / State sides
Years	Team	Apps	(Points)
2014–2022	Auckland	27	(80)
Super Rugby
Years	Team	Apps	(Points)
2022	Blues Women	2	(0)
International career
Years	Team	Apps	(Points)
2017–	New Zealand	25	(40)
National sevens team
Years	Team		Comps
2016–Present	New Zealand		186 apps
Medal record
Representing New Zealand
Women's rugby union
Women's Rugby World Cup
Gold medal – first place	2017 Ireland	Team competition
Gold medal – first place	2021 New Zealand	Team competition
Bronze medal – third place	2025 England	Team competition
Women's rugby sevens
Olympic Games
Gold medal – first place	2024 Paris	Team competition
Gold medal – first place	2020 Tokyo	Team competition
Silver medal – second place	2016 Rio de Janeiro	Team competition
Commonwealth Games
Gold medal – first place	2018 Gold Coast	Team competition
Bronze medal – third place	2022 Birmingham	Team competition
Rugby World Cup Sevens
Gold medal – first place	2018 San Francisco	Team competition

Theresa Matauaina Setefano (née Fitzpatrick; born 25 February 1995) is a New Zealand rugby union player. She was a member of the Black Ferns champion 2017 and 2021 Rugby World Cup squads. She has also represented New Zealand in rugby sevens; she won gold medals at the 2018 Rugby World Cup Sevens, 2018 Commonwealth Games, 2020 Summer Olympics in Tokyo and at the 2024 Summer Olympics in Paris. She played for the Blues Women in the 2022 Super Rugby Aupiki season.

Since her marriage in December 2023, she has used the surname, Setefano.

== Early life ==
Theresa Matauaina Fitzpatrick was born on 25 February 1995 to Greg and Faalogo Rosemary Fitzpatrick.

== Rugby career ==
=== 2016 ===
Setefano represents New Zealand in rugby sevens. She made her sevens debut at the 2016 USA Women's Sevens. She was named in the sevens squad for the 2016 Summer Olympics.

=== 2017–2020 ===
Setefano was named in the 2017 Women's Rugby World Cup squad and was part of the winning team of the 2019 Women's Rugby Super Series.

=== 2020 Tokyo Olympic Games ===
In July 2021, she was a member of the New Zealand team that won the gold medal in the women's event at the 2020 Summer Olympics.

On 3 November 2021, She was named in the Blues squad for the inaugural Super Rugby Aupiki competition.

=== 2022 ===
Setefano was named in the Blues starting line up for their first game against Matatū, they won 21–10. She also started in their 0–35 thrashing by the Chiefs Manawa in the final round.

Setefano was named in the Black Ferns Sevens squad for the 2022 Commonwealth Games in Birmingham. She won a bronze medal at the Commonwealth Games.

In August 2022, she was selected in Black Ferns XV's team for the test series against Australia for the Laurie O'Reilly Cup. She made the Black Ferns 32-player squad for the delayed 2021 Rugby World Cup. She scored a try in the second pool game against Wales. Her second try came in the final pool game against Scotland. Setefano also scored a try in the Black Ferns nail-biting semifinal clash with France as they fought their way into the final.

=== 2024–25 ===
After taking a break from rugby through most of 2023 she was named in February 2024 in the Black Fern Sevens squad for the remainder of the 2023–24 season.

On 20 June 2024 it was announced that she had been selected as a member of the New Zealand Women's Rugby Sevens team for the Paris Olympics. The team won the gold medal, defeating Canada 19–12 in the final to give both her and New Zealand back-to-back Olympic gold medals.

In July 2025, she was named in the Black Ferns squad to the Women's Rugby World Cup.

== Personal life ==
Setefano undertakes medical studies at the University of Auckland.

In Rarotonga in the Cook Islands on 22 December 2023 Setefano married Ryan Quentin Setefano. Setefano played 166 premier games for Marist St Pats rugby team and was head coach of the club's women's team for eight seasons. In 2023, he was appointed the assistant coach to Wellington Pride women's rugby team during their 2023 Farah Palmer Cup campaign.

Her older sister, Sulu Fitzpatrick is a New Zealand netball international. The Fitzpatrick sisters both represented New Zealand at the 2022 Commonwealth Games.

Two of Setefano's uncles, Olo Brown and Tana Umaga, were New Zealand rugby union internationals.
