= Ariana Bayler =

New Zealand rugby player

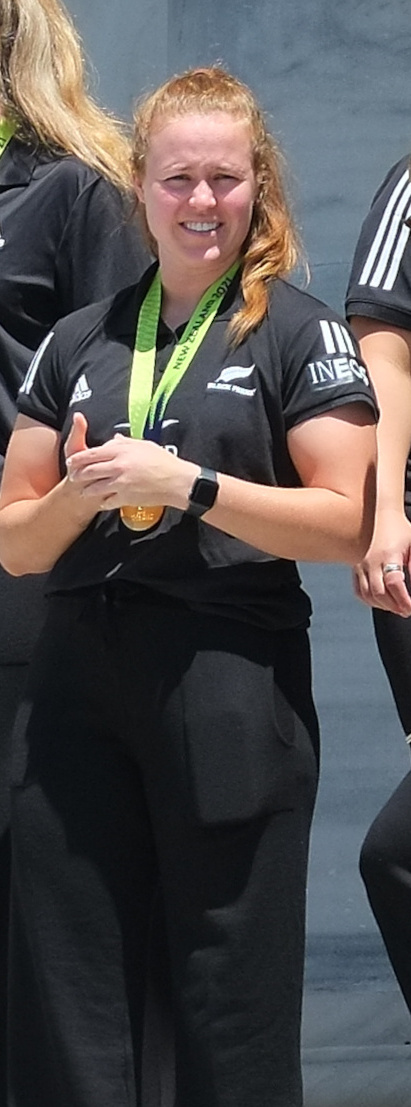
- Born: 14 December 1996 (age 29) Waihi, New Zealand
- Height: 1.65 m (5 ft 5 in)
- Weight: 60 kg (132 lb)

Rugby union career
- Position: Halfback
Provincial / State sides
Years	Team	Apps	(Points)
2013–Present	Waikato	59	(106)
Super Rugby
Years	Team	Apps	(Points)
2021; 2024–Present	Chiefs Manawa	16	(11)
2023	Blues Women	5	(0)
International career
Years	Team	Apps	(Points)
2021–	New Zealand	8	(0)
Medal record
Representing New Zealand
Women's rugby union
Rugby World Cup
Gold medal – first place	2021 New Zealand	Team competition

Ariana Bayler (born 14 December 1996) is a New Zealand rugby union player. She plays for the Black Ferns internationally and was a member of their 2021 Rugby World Cup champion squad. She also plays for Chiefs Manawa in the Super Rugby Aupiki competition and represents Waikato provincially.

== Rugby career ==
Bayler attended Hamilton Girls' High School and made her Farah Palmer Cup debut for Waikato as a 16-year-old in 2013. She has suffered three ACL injuries in her career since 2015.

In 2020, she played for the New Zealand Barbarians against the Black Ferns and then later for the Probables against the Possibles.

Bayler was named in the Black Ferns squad for their end of year tour of England and France; she featured in all four test matches. She made her international debut in the Black Ferns 100th test match, she came off the bench against England in Exeter on 31 October 2021.

The Chiefs named her in their squad for the inaugural season of Super Rugby Aupiki. Bayler was also in the initial team that beat the Blues at Eden Park in the historic first women's Super Rugby match in New Zealand.

Bayler was named in the Black Ferns squad for the 2022 Pacific Four Series. She was recalled into the squad for the August test series against the Wallaroos for the Laurie O'Reilly Cup. She was selected for the Black Ferns 2021 Rugby World Cup 32-player squad.
