= Awhina Tangen-Wainohu =

NZ international rugby union player

- Born: 16 December 1997 (age 28)
- Height: 1.72 m (5 ft 8 in)
- Weight: 95 kg (209 lb)

Rugby union career
- Position: Prop
Provincial / State sides
Years	Team	Apps	(Points)
2017	Hawke's Bay	6	(0)
2018–2022	Waikato	20	(35)
- Correct as of 19 June 2026
Super Rugby
Years	Team	Apps	(Points)
2021–2023	Chiefs Manawa	6	(0)
2025	Blues Women	8	(0)
- Correct as of 19 June 2026
International career
Years	Team	Apps	(Points)
2022–2025	New Zealand	10	(5)
- Correct as of 19 June 2026
Medal record
Representing New Zealand
Women's rugby union
Rugby World Cup
Gold medal – first place	2021 New Zealand	Team competition
Bronze medal – third place	2025 England	Team competition

Awhina Tangen-Wainohu (born 16 December 1997) is a retired New Zealand rugby union player. She represented New Zealand at international level and was a member of their 2021 Rugby World Cup champion squad. She played for Chiefs Manawa and Blues Women in the Super Rugby Aupiki competition and for Hawke's Bay and Waikato in the Farah Palmer Cup.

== Rugby career ==
=== 2021 ===
Tangen-Wainohu was named in the Chiefs team that played the Blues women in the first-ever women's super rugby match at Eden Park on 1 May 2021. She was later selected for the Chiefs Manawa squad for the inaugural 2022 Super Rugby Aupiki season.

=== 2022 ===
On August, Tangen-Wainohu was named in the Black Ferns squad for the Laurie O’Reilly Cup Test series. She made her international debut for New Zealand on 20 August against Australia at the Orangetheory Stadium in Christchurch.

Tangen-Wainohu was also selected for the 32-player squad to the delayed 2021 Rugby World Cup. She scored her first try against the Wallaroos in the opening match of the World Cup.

=== 2023–25 ===
On 17 April, She was given a fulltime Black Ferns contract for the first time as New Zealand Rugby announced the 34-contracted-players for the year.

In July 2025, she was named in the Black Ferns side to the Women's Rugby World Cup in England.

=== 2026 ===
In May 2026, Tangen-Wainohu was forced to retire due to a career-ending neck injury.
