= Phillipa Love =

NZ international rugby union player

- Born: 8 April 1990 (age 36) Southbridge, Canterbury, New Zealand
- Height: 1.73 m (5 ft 8 in)
- Weight: 90 kg (198 lb)

Rugby union career
- Position: Prop
Provincial / State sides
Years	Team	Apps	(Points)
2015–2023	Canterbury	55	(85)
Super Rugby
Years	Team	Apps	(Points)
2022–Present	Matatū	13	(10)
International career
Years	Team	Apps	(Points)
2014–	New Zealand	28	(10)
Medal record
Representing New Zealand
Women's rugby union
Rugby World Cup
Gold medal – first place	2021 New Zealand	Team competition

Phillipa "Pip" Love (born 8 April 1990) is a New Zealand rugby union player. She plays for the Black Ferns internationally and was a member of their 2021 Rugby World Cup champion squad. She also plays for Matatū in the Super Rugby Aupiki competition and represents Canterbury provincially.

== Rugby career ==
=== 2014–2016 ===
Love made her debut for New Zealand against Canada on 14 June 2014 at Whakatāne. She was overlooked altogether in 2015. She was recalled to the Black Ferns in 2016 for their Northern Hemisphere tour, but ruptured her ACL during training and was ruled out for six months.

=== 2017 ===
In 2017, she earned her second cap against Canada, but was not named in the World Cup squad. She featured in the test match against the United States in 2018 at Chicago. Love was selected for the 2019 Women's Rugby Super Series at San Diego and played in every game. She played for the Black Ferns against a New Zealand Barbarians team in 2020 at Trafalgar Park in Nelson, New Zealand.

=== 2021–2022 ===
Love was named in the Black Ferns squad for the European tour of England and France for 2021. She signed with Matatū for the inaugural Super Rugby Aupiki season in 2022.

Love was selected for the Black Ferns squad for the 2022 Pacific Four Series. In August, she made the team again for a two-test series against the Wallaroos for the Laurie O'Reilly Cup. She was selected for the Black Ferns 32-player squad for the 2021 Rugby World Cup.

=== 2023 ===
Love was selected in the Black Ferns 30-player squad to compete in the Pacific Four Series and O’Reilly Cup. In July, she made the starting line up in her sides 21–52 victory over Canada at the Pacific Four Series in Ottawa.
