= Amy Rule =

NZ international rugby union player (born 2000)

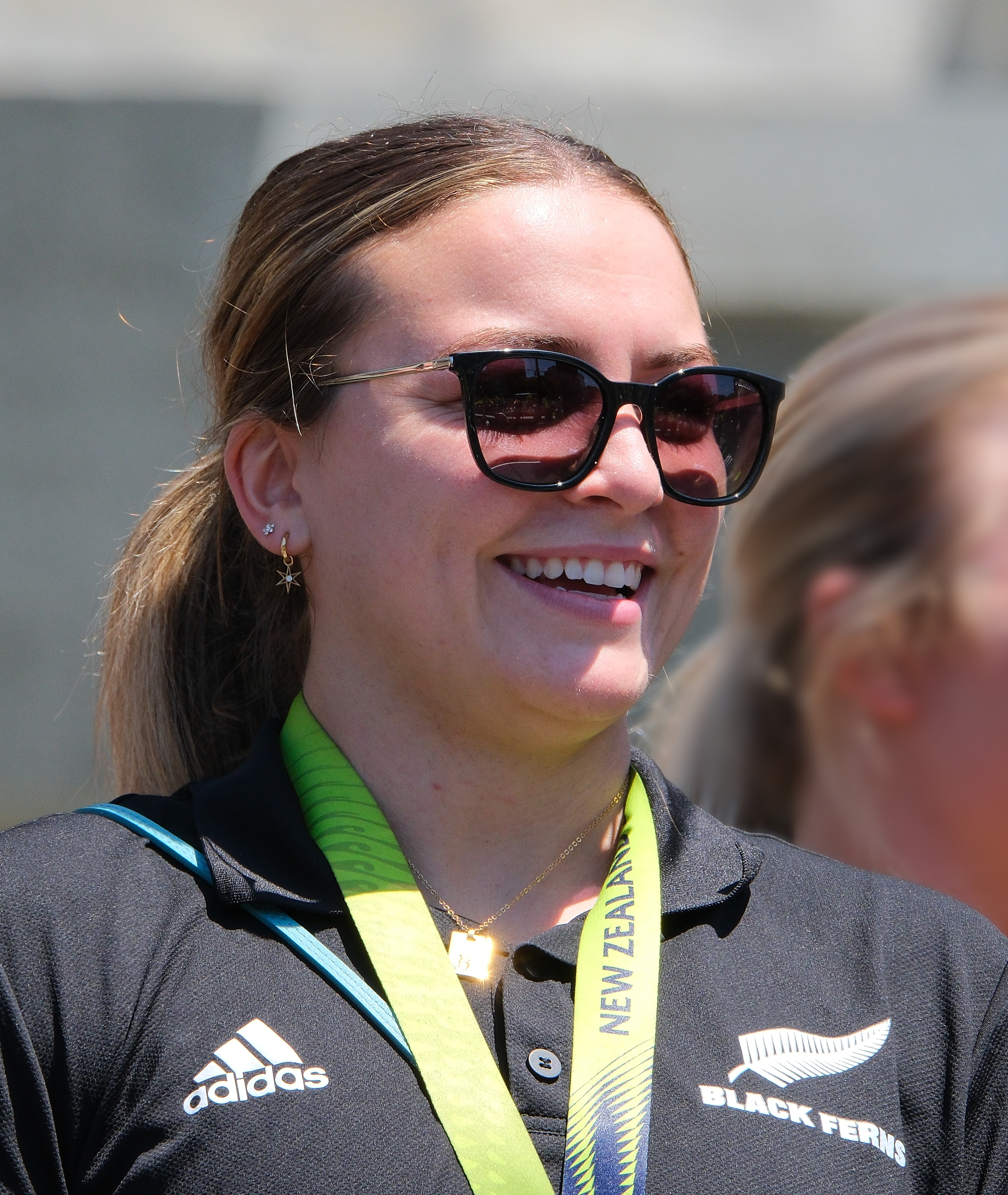
- Rule in 2022
- Born: Amy McKenzie Rule; 15 July 2000 (age 26) Lumsden, New Zealand
- Height: 1.69 m (5 ft 7 in)
- Weight: 99 kg (218 lb)

Rugby union career
- Position: Prop
Senior career
Years	Team	Apps	(Points)
2025–	Exeter Chiefs		(0)
Provincial / State sides
Years	Team	Apps	(Points)
2018	Otago	6	(0)
2019–2025	Canterbury	30	(20)
Super Rugby
Years	Team	Apps	(Points)
2022–2025	Matatū	14	(15)
International career
Years	Team	Apps	(Points)
2021–	New Zealand	34	(10)
Medal record
Women's rugby union
Representing New Zealand
Rugby World Cup
Gold medal – first place	2021 New Zealand	Team competition
Bronze medal – third place	2025 England	Team competition

Amy McKenzie Rule (born 15 July 2000) is a New Zealand rugby union player. She plays for the Black Ferns internationally and was a member of their 2021 Rugby World Cup champion squad. She also plays for Matatū in the Super Rugby Aupiki competition and represents Canterbury provincially.

== Rugby career ==
Rule only took up rugby in her final year at Aparima College; although her school did not have a rugby team, she was allowed to play for Central Southland College or any team that needed another player. After High School, she moved to Christchurch in 2019 for University. She played for Canterbury in the Farah Palmer Cup.

=== 2019–2020 ===
In 2019, she was selected in the New Zealand Development XV's team that competed at the Oceania Rugby Women's Championship. She played for the New Zealand Barbarians against the Black Ferns in 2020.

=== 2021 ===
Rule was selected for the Black Ferns Autumn International Tour. She made her international debut for New Zealand on their Northern Tour, against England on 7 November at Northampton. She signed with Matatū for the inaugural Super Rugby Aupiki.

=== 2022 ===
Rule was selected for the Black Ferns squad for the 2022 Pacific Four Series. She was recalled into the squad for a two-test series against the Wallaroos for the Laurie O'Reilly Cup in August. A month later she was selected for the Black Ferns 2021 Rugby World Cup 32-player squad.

Rule scored a try against Wales in the quarterfinals of the deferred World Cup. In the World Cup final against England, she scored a try from the back of a maul just before half-time.

=== 2023 ===
Rule scored the first try for her side in the final of the 2023 Aupiki season which helped shift the momentum for Matatū against Chiefs Manawa in their first title win.

In July, she made the Black Ferns starting line up in the 21–52 victory over Canada at the Pacific Four Series in Ottawa.

On 15 November, she re-signed with Matatū for her third season of Super Rugby Aupiki.

=== 2025 ===
In June 2025, Exeter Chiefs Women announced that they had signed Rule for the 2025–26 Premiership Women's Rugby season, she was the first capped Black Fern to sign for a team in Premiership Women's Rugby. In July 2025, she was named in the Black Ferns side to the Women's Rugby World Cup in England.
