= Ashley Marsters =

Australia international rugby union & league player

- Born: 2 November 1993 (age 33) Rarotonga, Cook Islands
- Height: 1.65 m (5 ft 5 in)
- Weight: 86 kg (13 st 8 lb)

Rugby union career
- Position: Hooker
Super Rugby
Years	Team	Apps	(Points)
2018–2024	Melbourne Rebels	27	(20)
2025	Western Force		(0)
International career
Years	Team	Apps	(Points)
2014–25	Australia	45	(65)
- Rugby league career

Playing information
- Position: Prop, Second-row
Club
Years	Team	Pld	T	G	FG	P
2026–	North Queensland Cowboys	9	3	0	0	12
- As of 13 November 2026

Ashley Marsters (born 2 November 1993) is an Australian rugby union & rugby league player. She has played Hooker internationally for Australia, and for the Western Force in the Super Rugby Women's competition. She has represented Australia at the 2014 and 2021 Rugby World Cups. She currently plays as prop or second-row for North Queensland Cowboys in the NRLW.

== Rugby union career ==
Marsters primarily played as a hooker or flanker, but has also played in every position in the game which includes all three front row positions in the same game. She was selected for the Australian squad and played as a Centre at the 2014 Women's Rugby World Cup in France.

She made her Super W debut against the Western Force in March 2018. She played for Australia A at the 2019 Oceania Rugby Women's Championship in Fiji.

She was named in the Wallaroos squad for test matches against Fiji and Japan in May 2022. She was then selected for the 2022 Pacific Four Series competition that was held in New Zealand. She came off the bench against the Black Ferns in the opening match of the Pacific Four series on 6 June.

Marsters made the Wallaroos squad for a two-test series against the Black Ferns at the Laurie O'Reilly Cup. She was subsequently selected in the team again for the delayed 2022 Rugby World Cup in New Zealand.

In 2023, she made the Wallaroos side for the Pacific Four Series, and the O'Reilly Cup. She started in the final two games of the Pacific Series against the United States and Canada, she scored her sides only try against the latter.

In 2024, she became the most capped Wallaroos’ player in history during the WXV 2 tournament in Cape Town in October.

She signed with the Western Force for the 2025 Super Rugby Women's season. She was named in the Wallaroos squad for the 2025 Women's Rugby World Cup in England.

== Rugby league ==
=== North Queensland Cowboys Women ===
On 6 May 2026 it was reported that she had signed for North Queensland Cowboys in the NRLW

== Personal life ==
In March 2026, Marsters starred in the reality TV sports game show Rivals: Sport vs. Sport representing "Team Rugby Union". Her teammates included Joseph-Aukuso Sua'ali'i, Desiree Miller, and Harry Wilson.
