= Georgia Ponsonby =

New Zealand rugby union player (born 1999)

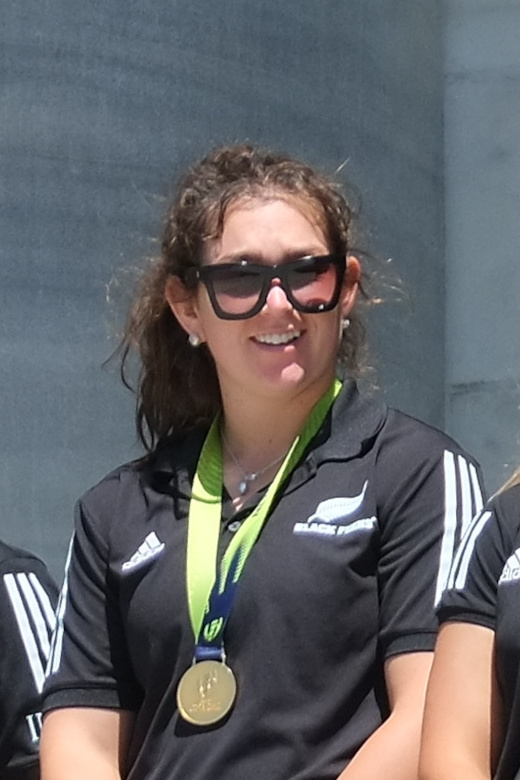
- Ponsonby in 2022
- Born: 14 December 1999 (age 26)
- Height: 1.73 m (5 ft 8 in)
- Weight: 88 kg (194 lb)

Rugby union career
- Position: Hooker
Senior career
Years	Team	Apps	(Points)
2025–	Trailfinders		(20)
Provincial / State sides
Years	Team	Apps	(Points)
2017	Manawatu	6	(5)
2018–2023	Canterbury	39	(45)
Super Rugby
Years	Team	Apps	(Points)
2022–	Matatū	23	(30)
International career
Years	Team	Apps	(Points)
2021–	New Zealand	48	(30)
Medal record
Representing New Zealand
Women's rugby union
Rugby World Cup
Gold medal – first place	2021 New Zealand	Team competition
Bronze medal – third place	2025 England	Team competition

Georgia Ponsonby (born 14 December 1999) is a New Zealand rugby union player. She represents New Zealand internationally and was a member of their 2021 Rugby World Cup champion squad. She also plays for Matatū in the Super Rugby Aupiki competition and represents Canterbury provincially.

== Rugby career ==
Ponsonby attended Feilding High School. She made her debut for Manawatu in the Farah Palmer Cup in 2017. She received a scholarship and went to Lincoln University in Canterbury. She played two seasons for Canterbury at Number 8 before switching to Hooker in 2020.

In 2021, she was selected for the Black Ferns tour of England and France, but only played in the two test matches against France. She made her Black Ferns test debut off the bench against France in Pau on 13 November. She earned her second cap in the second test match against France.

She signed with Matatū for the inaugural Super Rugby Aupiki season in 2022.

Ponsonby was selected for the Black Ferns squad for the 2022 Pacific Four Series. She made the team again for a two-test series against the Wallaroos for the Laurie O'Reilly Cup in August. She was selected in the Black Ferns squad for the delayed 2021 Rugby World Cup. She scored the first try against England in the World Cup final.

In July 2023, she featured in the Black Ferns 21–52 victory over Canada at the Pacific Four Series in Ottawa.

In July 2025, she was named in the Black Ferns side to the Women's Rugby World Cup in England.

In June 2025, it was announced that she would join Premiership Women's Rugby club Trailfinders Women from the 2025–26 season.
