= Joanah Ngan-Woo =

NZ international rugby union player

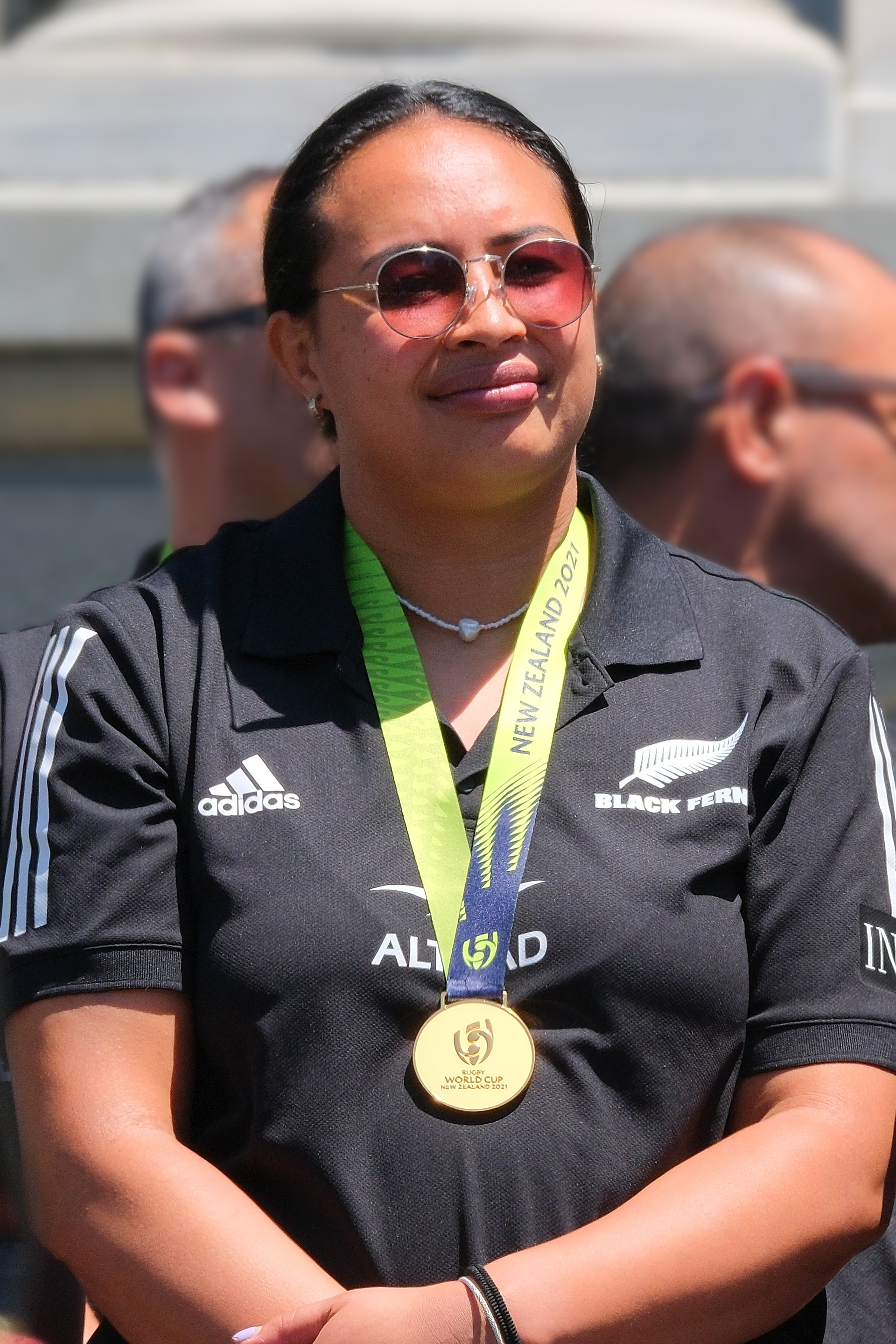
- Ngan-Woo with Rugby World Cup medal in 2022
- Born: 15 December 1995 (age 30) Wellington, New Zealand
- Height: 1.82 m (6 ft 0 in)
- Weight: 88 kg (194 lb)

Rugby union career
- Position: Lock
Provincial / State sides
Years	Team	Apps	(Points)
2013–Present	Wellington	69	(105)
Super Rugby
Years	Team	Apps	(Points)
2022–Present	Hurricanes Poua	12	(15)
International career
Years	Team	Apps	(Points)
2019–2023	New Zealand	19	(20)
Medal record
Women's rugby union
Representing New Zealand
Rugby World Cup
Gold medal – first place	2021 New Zealand	Team competition

Joanah Ngan-Woo (born 15 December 1995) is a New Zealand rugby union player. She plays Lock for the Black Ferns and was a member of their 2021 Rugby World Cup champion squad. She plays for Hurricanes Poua in the Super Rugby Aupiki competition and for Wellington provincially.

== Personal life ==
Ngan-Woo is of Chinese and Samoan descent. Her great-grandfather migrated from China to Samoa. She took up rugby in Year 9 at St Catherine's College in 2009 and was soon promoted to the Oriental Rongotai seniors while still a schoolgirl. She has a Bachelor of Arts in Social Policy and Education from Victoria University and also completed a Masters in International Relations in 2019.

== Rugby career ==
Ngan-Woo was one of 28 players who were the first to receive a professional contract with the Black Ferns in 2018.

She made her Black Ferns test debut against the United States on 2 July 2019 in the Women's Rugby Super Series in San Diego. She later earned her second cap against England. Ngan-Woo scored her first international try against Australia on 10 August 2019 at Perth. The Black Ferns thrashed the Wallaroos 47–10.

Ngan-Woo was selected for the Black Ferns 2021 Europe tour, she played in the second test match against England and in the first test match against France.

In 2022, she signed with the Hurricanes Poua for the inaugural season of Super Rugby Aupiki and scored the first ever Hurricanes Poua try against Chiefs Manawa in Hamilton.

She was named for the Black Ferns squad for the 2022 Pacific Four Series. She was selected again for the two-test series against the Wallaroos for the Laurie O'Reilly Cup in August where she scored tries in both tests.

Ngan-Woo made the Black Ferns 32-player squad for the 2021 Rugby World Cup. She became the first ever Black Fern forward to score a try in a Rugby World Cup. In the World Cup final, she made the winning play as she stole the ball from England's line-out throw.

In 2023, she recommitted to Hurricanes Poua for a second season.
