= Santo Taumata =

- Born: 5 February 2003 (age 23)
- Height: 178 cm (5 ft 10 in)
- Weight: 110 kg (243 lb; 17 st 5 lb)

Rugby union career
- Position: Prop
Provincial / State sides
Years	Team	Apps	(Points)
2021–2024	Bay of Plenty	13	(0)
Super Rugby
Years	Team	Apps	(Points)
2022–2025	Chiefs Manawa	9	(0)
2026-	Matatū	6	(0)
International career
Years	Team	Apps	(Points)
2022	New Zealand	13	(0)
Medal record
Representing New Zealand
Women's rugby union
Rugby World Cup
Gold medal – first place	2021 New Zealand	Team competition

Santo Taumata (born 5 February 2003) is a New Zealand rugby union player. She plays for the Black Ferns internationally and was a member of their 2021 Rugby World Cup champion squad. She also plays for the Chiefs Manawa in the Super Rugby Aupiki competition and for Bay of Plenty provincially.

== Rugby career ==
=== 2022 ===
Taumata was selected for the Chiefs Manawa squad for the inaugural 2022 Super Rugby Aupiki season. She was awarded the Emerging Player of the Year for her efforts in the 2022 Farah Palmer Cup season and was also Female Club Player of the Year at the 2022 Zespri Bay of Plenty Rugby Awards.

Taumata was named in the Black Ferns squad for the Laurie O’Reilly Cup Test series against Australia. She made her international debut on 27 August 2022 in Adelaide. She was later selected for the 2021 Rugby World Cup 32-player squad.

=== 2023 ===
In 2023, She re-signed with the Chiefs Manawa for a second year. On 17 April, She was given a fulltime Black Ferns contract for the first time as New Zealand Rugby announced the 34-contracted-players for the year.
