= Jay Tregonning =

Australian rugby union coach (born 1978)

- Born: 13 February 1978 (age 48) Wollongong, NSW, Australia
- Occupation: Former Wallaroos Head Coach

Rugby union career
- Position(s): Hooker for NSW U19 and U21, and Shute Shield
International career
Years	Team	Apps	(Points)
	Australia U19		(0)
Coaching career
- Years: Team
- 2007: NSW Country Cockatoos
- 2014: Australia Women's (assistant coach)
- 2015: Australian Schools Barbarians
- 2016–21: Australia School's
- 2018–19: Kyuden Voltex forwards coach (JRLO)
- 2021–Present: Australia Women's (head coach)

Jay Tregonning (born 13 February 1978) is an Australian rugby union coach. He was previously the Head Coach of the Australian women's national rugby union team (the Wallaroos) from 2021 - 2023. He has been the most successful Wallaroos coach so far in history, leaving them fifth in the world ranking at the end of 2023, the highest spot they have held since 2020. His second last game with the Wallaroos was a historic 29-20 victory over world No. 3 France on October 27, 2023, during Round 2 of the inaugural WXV 1 tournament at Forsyth Barr Stadium in Dunedin, New Zealand.

== Coaching career ==
Tregonning was the Wallaroos assistant coach at the 2014 Rugby World Cup in France. He has served as an Assistant Coach in the Australian Schools and the Under 18's program., where he was part of the coaching staff of the Australian Schoolboys team that beat the New Zealand Schoolboys and broke a seven-year losing streak in 2019.

Tregonning was appointed as the Wallaroos Head Coach in September 2021 following the resignation of Dwayne Nestor. He coached the Wallaroos at the 2021 Rugby World Cup in New Zealand where they reached the quarter-final.

Tregonning was re-signed as the Wallaroos head coach for the 2023 season.
