= 2022 Pacific Four Series squads =

The 2022 Pacific Four Series is the 2nd edition of the Pacific Four Series, an annual rugby union competition contested by Australia, Canada, New Zealand and the United States. New Zealand and Australia are joining the competition for the first time, they were expected to compete in 2021, but due to the COVID-19 pandemic, World Rugby decided to go ahead with a soft launch.

Note: Number of caps are indicated as of the first match of the tournament (6 June 2022).

== Australia ==
The Wallaroos announced their 32-player squad for the 2022 Pacific Four Series on 19 May.

Player	Position	Date of birth (age)	Caps	Club
Ashley Marsters	Hooker	2 November 1993 (aged 28)	12	(Australia) Melbourne Rebels
Tiarna Molloy	Hooker	8 November 1998 (aged 23)	uncapped	(Australia) Queensland Reds
Adiana Talakai	Hooker	24 February 1999 (aged 23)	2	(Australia) NSW Waratahs
Bree-Anna Cheatham	Prop	29 March 1997 (aged 25)	uncapped	(Australia) Queensland Reds
Asoiva (Eva) Karpani	Prop	18 June 1996 (aged 25)	4	(Australia) NSW Waratahs
Bridie O'Gorman	Prop	8 December 1998 (aged 23)	2	(Australia) NSW Waratahs
Liz Patu	Prop	15 July 1989 (aged 32)	25	(Australia) Queensland Reds
Madison Schuck	Prop	8 October 1991 (aged 30)	2	(Australia) Queensland Reds
Annabelle Codey	Lock	3 February 1997 (aged 25)	uncapped	(Australia) Queensland Reds
Grace Kemp	Lock	8 June 2001 (aged 20)	uncapped	(Australia) ACT Brumbies
Kaitlan Leaney	Lock	10 October 2000 (aged 21)	2	(Australia) NSW Waratahs
Michaela Leonard	Lock	6 March 1995 (aged 27)	5	(Australia) ACT Brumbies
Sera Naiqama	Lock	26 July 1995 (aged 26)	2	(Australia) NSW Waratahs
Emily Chancellor	Loose forward	20 August 1991 (aged 30)	8	(Australia) NSW Waratahs
Piper Duck	Loose forward	2 April 2001 (aged 21)	2	(Australia) NSW Waratahs
Grace Hamilton	Loose forward	4 March 1992 (aged 30)	17	(Australia) NSW Waratahs
Tamika Jones	Loose forward	13 June 2003 (aged 18)	uncapped	(Australia) Western Force
Siokapesi Palu	Loose forward	15 October 1996 (aged 25)	uncapped	(Australia) ACT Brumbies
Shannon Parry	Loose forward	27 October 1989 (aged 32)	14	(Australia) Queensland Reds
Iliseva Batibasaga	Scrum-half	23 March 1985 (aged 37)	17	(Australia) NSW Waratahs
Layne Morgan	Scrum-half	20 April 1999 (aged 23)	2	(Australia) NSW Waratahs
Arabella McKenzie	Fly-half	1 March 1999 (aged 23)	6	(Australia) NSW Waratahs
Georgina Friedrichs	Centre	14 April 1995 (aged 27)	2	(Australia) NSW Waratahs
Jemima McCalman	Centre	26 May 1999 (aged 23)	2	(Australia) ACT Brumbies
Trilleen Pomare	Centre	5 April 1993 (aged 29)	13	(Australia) Western Force
Cecilia Smith	Centre	13 March 1994 (aged 28)	uncapped	(Australia) Queensland Reds
Lillyann Mason-Spice	Wing		uncapped	(Australia) ACT Brumbies
Ivania Wong	Wing	23 September 1997 (aged 24)	2	(Australia) Queensland Reds
Lori Cramer	Utility back	8 March 1993 (aged 29)	6	(Australia) NSW Waratahs
Mahalia Murphy	Utility back	19 January 1994 (aged 28)	13	(Australia) NSW Waratahs
Pauline Piliae-Rasabale	Utility back	3 February 1992 (aged 30)	2	(Australia) NSW Waratahs
Melanie Wilks	Utility back	13 January 2000 (aged 22)	uncapped	(Australia) Queensland Reds

== Canada ==
Kevin Rouet named Canada's 32-player squad for the 2022 Pacific Four Series on 11 May.

Player	Position	Date of birth (age)	Club
Veronica Harrigan	Hooker		(Canada) Brantford Harlequins
Laura Russell	Hooker	10 November 1988 (aged 33)	(Canada) Toronto Nomads
Emily Tuttosi	Hooker	21 September 1995 (aged 26)	(England) Exeter Chiefs
Olivia DeMerchant	Prop	16 February 1991 (aged 31)	(Canada) Halifax Tars RFC
Alex Ellis	Prop	1 August 1995 (aged 26)	(England) Saracens
Brittany Kassil	Prop	14 March 1991 (aged 31)	(Canada) Guelph Redcoats
DaLeaka Menin	Prop	16 June 1995 (aged 26)	(England) Exeter Chiefs
Mikiela Nelson	Prop	27 November 1997 (aged 24)	(Canada) Capilano RFC
Tyson Beukeboom	Lock	10 March 1991 (aged 31)	(Canada) Cowichan RFC
McKinley Hunt	Lock	5 January 1997 (aged 25)	(England) Exeter Chiefs
Emma Taylor	Lock	9 July 1992 (aged 29)	(England) Saracens
Pamphinette Buisa	Back row	28 December 1996 (aged 25)	(Canada) Ottawa Irish
Sophie de Goede	Back row	30 June 1999 (aged 22)	(Canada) Castaway Wanderers RFC
Courtney Holtkamp	Back row	25 April 1999 (aged 23)	(England) Loughborough Lightning
Karen Paquin	Back row	3 August 1987 (aged 34)	(France) Stade Bordelais
Gabrielle Senft	Back row	13 June 1997 (aged 24)	(Canada) Castaway Wanderers RFC
Sara Svoboda	Back row	3 February 1995 (aged 27)	(England) Loughborough Lightning
Abby Duguid	Forward		(England) Loughborough Lightning
Maya Montiel	Forward		(Canada) University of Ottawa
Brianna Miller	Scrum-half	18 September 1991 (aged 30)	(Canada) Sainte-Anne-de-Bellevue RFC
Chloe Daniels	Scrum-half	27 April 2003 (aged 19)	(Canada) Aurora Barbarians
Justine Pelletier	Scrum-half	27 February 2001 (aged 21)	(France) Stade Bordelais
Anaïs Holly	Fly-half	10 December 1992 (aged 29)	(Canada) Town of Mont-Royal R.F.C.
Taylor Perry	Fly-half	23 July 2000 (aged 21)	(Canada) Oakville Crusaders
Alexandra Tessier	Fly-half	3 September 1993 (aged 28)	(Canada) Sainte-Anne-de-Bellevue RFC
Sara Kaljuvee	Centre	7 February 1993 (aged 29)	(Canada) Toronto Scottish RFC
Paige Farries	Wing	12 August 1994 (aged 27)	(England) Worcester Warriors
Sabrina Poulin	Wing	3 October 1992 (aged 29)	(France) Stade Rennais
Alysha Corrigan	Fullback	5 January 1997 (aged 25)	(England) Saracens
Elissa Alarie	Fullback	31 January 1986 (aged 36)	(Canada) Braves de Trois-Rivières
Renee Gonzalez	Utility back	14 July 1998 (aged 23)	(Canada) Westshore RFC
Maddy Grant	Utility back	12 March 2001 (aged 21)	(Canada) University of Ottawa

== New Zealand ==
The Black Ferns named their 31-player squad for the series on 4 May. On 19 May, the Black Ferns made three changes to their line-up, Renee Wickliffe, Hazel Tubic and Kelsey Teneti joined the squad with Sylvia Brunt named as a travelling reserve. Patricia Maliepo was replaced due to concussion, while Grace Steinmetz and Carla Hohepa withdrew from the squad because of foot injuries.

Player	Position	Date of birth (age)	Caps	Club / Province
Luka Connor	Hooker	24 September 1996 (aged 25)	4	(New Zealand) Chiefs Manawa / Bay of Plenty
Natalie Delamere	Hooker	9 November 1996 (aged 25)	uncapped	(New Zealand) Matatū / Bay of Plenty
Georgia Ponsonby	Hooker	14 December 1999 (aged 22)	2	(New Zealand) Matatū / Canterbury
Lucy Anderson	Prop	18 May 1991 (aged 31)	uncapped	(New Zealand) Matatū / Canterbury
Tanya Kalounivale	Prop	20 January 1999 (aged 23)	uncapped	(New Zealand) Chiefs Manawa / Waikato
Pip Love	Prop	8 April 1990 (aged 32)	15	(New Zealand) Matatū / Canterbury
Angel Mulu	Prop	21 November 1999 (aged 22)	uncapped	(New Zealand) Chiefs Manawa / Bay of Plenty
Krystal Murray	Prop	16 June 1993 (aged 28)	1	(New Zealand) Blues / Northland
Leilani Perese	Prop	1 January 1993 (aged 29)	11	(New Zealand) Counties Manukau
Amy Rule	Prop	15 July 2000 (aged 21)	3	(New Zealand) Matatū / Canterbury
Chelsea Bremner	Lock	11 April 1995 (aged 27)	uncapped	(New Zealand) Matatū / Canterbury
Joanah Ngan-Woo	Lock	15 December 1995 (aged 26)	5	(New Zealand) Hurricanes Poua / Wellington
Maiakawanakaulani Roos	Lock	27 July 2001 (aged 20)	3	(New Zealand) Blues / Auckland
Alana Bremner	Loose forward	10 February 1997 (aged 25)	3	(New Zealand) Matatū / Canterbury
Tafito Lafaele	Loose forward	17 February 2001 (aged 21)	uncapped	(New Zealand) Blues / Auckland
Liana Mikaele-Tu'u	Loose forward	2 March 2002 (aged 20)	4	(New Zealand) Blues / Auckland
Kaipo Olsen-Baker	Loose forward	1 May 2002 (aged 20)	uncapped	(New Zealand) Hurricanes Poua / Manawatu
Kendra Reynolds	Loose forward	25 January 1993 (aged 29)	1	(New Zealand) Matatū / Bay of Plenty
Ariana Bayler	Scrum-half	14 December 1996 (aged 25)	4	(New Zealand) Chiefs Manawa / Waikato
Kendra Cocksedge	Scrum-half	1 July 1988 (aged 33)	57	(New Zealand) Matatū / Canterbury
Arihiana Marino-Tauhinu	Scrum-half	29 March 1992 (aged 30)	6	(New Zealand) Chiefs Manawa / Counties Manukau
Ruahei Demant (c)	Inside back	21 April 1995 (aged 27)	15	(New Zealand) Blues / Auckland
Amy du Plessis	Inside back	7 July 1999 (aged 22)	uncapped	(New Zealand) Matatū / Canterbury
Carla Hohepa	Inside back	27 July 1985 (aged 36)	28	(New Zealand) Chiefs Manawa / Waikato
Patricia Maliepo	Inside back	13 March 2003 (aged 19)	3	(New Zealand) Blues / Auckland
Chelsea Semple	Inside back	7 November 1992 (aged 29)	26	(New Zealand) Chiefs Manawa / Waikato
Renee Holmes	Outside back	21 December 1999 (aged 22)	1	(New Zealand) Matatū / Waikato
Ayesha Leti-I'iga	Outside back	3 January 1999 (aged 23)	12	(New Zealand) Hurricanes Poua / Wellington
Cheyelle Robins-Reti	Outside back	9 March 1997 (aged 25)	3	(New Zealand) Hurricanes Poua / Waikato
Grace Steinmetz	Outside back	16 January 1998 (aged 24)	uncapped	(New Zealand) Matatū / Canterbury
Ruby Tui	Outside back	13 December 1991 (aged 30)	uncapped	(New Zealand) Chiefs Manawa / Counties Manukau
Renee Wickliffe	Outside back	30 May 1987 (aged 35)	43	(New Zealand) Chiefs Manawa
Hazel Tubic	Outside back	31 December 1990 (aged 31)	11	(New Zealand) Chiefs Manawa
Kelsey Teneti	Outside back	12 May 2003 (aged 19)	uncapped	Black Ferns 7s

== United States ==
The Eagles named their 28-player traveling roster for the Pacific Four Series on 9 May. On 29 May, the Eagles called up Elizabeth Cairns to replace Jenny Kronish due to an unfortunate injury she sustained during a club game, Shelby Lin, McKenzie Hawkins, Amy Talei Bonté and Sam Sullivan were also called up to join the squad. Kate Zackary, Hope Rogers, Rachel Johnson, Carly Waters, Megan Foster, Gabby Cantorna, Alev Kelter, Charlotte Clapp and Jennine Detiveaux were all unavailable due to commitments to their respective clubs for the Allianz Premier 15s final on June 3. They later joined the squad after the Allianz Premier 15s final.

Notes:

(*) denotes replacements. † Unavailable players.

Player	Position	Date of birth (age)	Club
Joanna Kitlinski	Hooker	5 July 1988 (aged 33)	(England) Sale Sharks
Kathryn Treder	Hooker	13 March 1996 (aged 26)	(United States) Beantown RFC
Catie Benson	Prop	10 February 1992 (aged 30)	(England) Sale Sharks
Charli Jacoby	Prop	9 October 1989 (aged 32)	(England) Loughborough Lightning
Nick James	Prop	20 January 1989 (aged 33)	(England) Sale Sharks
Maya Learned	Prop	1 January 1996 (aged 26)	(England) Gloucester-Hartpury
Hope Rogers †	Prop / Hooker	7 January 1993 (aged 29)	(England) Exeter Chiefs
Evelyn Ashenbrucker	Lock	6 August 1990 (aged 31)	(United States) San Diego Surfers
Jenny Kronish †	Lock	27 December 1996 (aged 25)	(England) Harlequins
Kristine Sommer	Lock	2 October 1990 (aged 31)	(England) Gloucester-Hartpury
Jordan Matyas	Lock / Back row	2 July 1993 (aged 28)	USA 7s
Hallie Taufo'ou	Lock / Back row	26 May 1994 (aged 28)	(England) Loughborough Lightning
Elizabeth Cairns *	Flanker	23 October 1992 (aged 29)	(United States) Life West Gladiatrix
Rachel Johnson †	Flanker	5 February 1991 (aged 31)	(England) Exeter Chiefs
Georgie Perris-Redding	Flanker	1 October 1997 (aged 24)	(England) Sale Sharks
Kathryn Johnson	Number 8	25 October 1991 (aged 30)	(United States) Twin Cities Amazons
Kate Zackary †	Number 8	26 July 1989 (aged 32)	(England) Exeter Chiefs
Bridget Kahele	Scrum-half	1 August 1996 (aged 25)	(United States) Beantown RFC
Shelby Lin *	Scrum-half	1 January 1990 (aged 32)	(United States) Berkeley All Blues
Carly Waters †	Scrum-half	19 December 1995 (aged 26)	(England) Saracens
Gabby Cantorna †	Fly-half	2 August 1995 (aged 26)	(England) Exeter Chiefs
Megan Foster †	Fly-half	24 April 1992 (aged 30)	(England) Exeter Chiefs
McKenzie Hawkins *	Fly-half	8 January 1997 (aged 25)	(United States) Life West Gladiatrix
Amy Talei Bonté *	Centre	20 October 1990 (aged 31)	(United States) Life West Gladiatrix
Katana Howard	Centre	25 June 1993 (aged 28)	(England) Sale Sharks
Alev Kelter †	Centre	21 March 1991 (aged 31)	(England) Saracens
Emily Henrich	Centre / Wing	10 October 1999 (aged 22)	(United States) Beantown RFC / Dartmouth College
Charlotte Clapp †	Wing	13 January 1995 (aged 27)	(England) Saracens
Jennine Detiveaux †	Wing	12 October 1993 (aged 28)	(England) Exeter Chiefs
Meya Bizer	Fullback	10 May 1993 (aged 29)	(United States) Beantown RFC
Tess Feury	Fullback	15 March 1996 (aged 26)	(United States) New York Rugby Club / Railway Union RFC
Bulou Mataitoga	Fullback	8 April 1994 (aged 28)	(England) Loughborough Lightning
Sam Sullivan *	Fullback	22 May 1998 (aged 24)	(United States) Colorado Gray Wolves
