= 2021 Rugby World Cup knockout stage =

The knockout stage of the 2021 Rugby World Cup began on 29 October 2022 and concluded on 12 November 2022 with the final at Eden Park in Auckland, New Zealand.

== Qualified teams ==
Pool	Winners	Runners-up	Best third-placed teams
A	New Zealand	Australia	Wales
B	Canada	Italy	United States
C	England	France	N/A

== Bracket ==
Quarter-finals
29 October – Whangārei
France	39
Italy	3
29 October – Whangārei
New Zealand	55
Wales	3
30 October – Auckland (Waitakere)
England	41
Australia	5
30 October – Auckland (Waitakere)
Canada	32
United States	11

Semi-finals
5 November – Auckland (Eden)
France	24
New Zealand	25
5 November – Auckland (Eden)
England	26
Canada	19

Final
12 November – Auckland (Eden)
New Zealand	34
England	31
Third place
12 November – Auckland (Eden)
France	36
Canada	0

=== Quarter-finals ===
29 October 2022
16:30 NZDT (UTC+13)

France	39–3	Italy
Try: Grisez (3) 3' c, 68' m, 70' c Penalty try 61'; Touyé 64' c Con: Drouin (2/2) 3', 65'; Queyroi (1/2) 71'; Pen: Drouin (2/2) 40', 55'	Report	Pen: Sillari (1/1) 39'

Northland Events Centre, Whangārei
Referee: Hollie Davidson (Scotland)

FB	15	Émilie Boulard
RW	14	Joanna Grisez
OC	13	Maëlle Filopon	(substituted off) 69'
IC	12	Gabrielle Vernier
LW	11	Marine Ménager
FH	10	Caroline Drouin	(substituted off) 66'
SH	9	Pauline Bourdon	(substituted off) 69'
N8	8	Charlotte Escudero
OF	7	Marjorie Mayans
BF	6	Gaëlle Hermet (c)
RL	5	Madoussou Fall	(substituted off) 55'
LL	4	Céline Ferer	(substituted off) 69'
TP	3	Clara Joyeux	(substituted off) 53'
HK	2	Agathe Sochat	(substituted off) 62'
LP	1	Annaëlle Deshayes	(substituted off) 53'
Replacements:
HK	16	Laure Touyé	(substituted in) 62'
PR	17	Coco Lindelauf	(substituted in) 53'
PR	18	Assia Khalfaoui	(substituted in) 53'
LK	19	Safi N'Diaye	(substituted in) 55'
FL	20	Emeline Gros	(substituted in) 69'
SH	21	Alexandra Chambon	(substituted in) 69'
CE	22	Lina Queyroi	(substituted in) 66'
FB	23	Chloé Jacquet	(substituted in) 69'
Coach:
(France) Thomas Darracq

FB	15	Vittoria Ostuni Minuzzi		(substituted off) 72'
RW	14	Aura Muzzo		(substituted off) 73'
OC	13	Michela Sillari
IC	12	Beatrice Rigoni
LW	11	Maria Magatti	(yellow card) 40'
FH	10	Veronica Madia
SH	9	Sofia Stefan		(substituted off) 65'
N8	8	Elisa Giordano (c)
OF	7	Isabella Locatelli		(substituted off) 50'
BF	6	Francesca Sgorbini		(substituted off) 78'
RL	5	Giordana Duca
LL	4	Valeria Fedrighi
TP	3	Lucia Gai		4' to 17'		(substituted off) 72'
HK	2	Melissa Bettoni		(substituted off) 72'
LP	1	Silvia Turani	(yellow card) 61'
Replacements:
HK	16	Vittoria Vecchini		(substituted in) 72'
PR	17	Gaia Maris			(substituted in) 66'	(substituted off) 72'
PR	18	Sara Seye		(substituted in) 4'	(substituted off) 17'	(substituted in) 72'
LK	19	Michela Merlo		(substituted in) 78'
FL	20	Beatrice Veronese		(substituted in) 50'	(substituted off) 66'	(substituted in) 72'
SH	21	Sara Barattin		(substituted in) 65'
WG	22	Alyssa D'Incà		(substituted in) 73'
FB	23	Manuela Furlan		(substituted in) 72'
Coach:
(Italy) Andrea Di Giandomenico

Player of the Match:
Émilie Boulard (France)

Assistant referees:
Amber McLachlan (Australia)
Tyler Miller (Australia)
Television match official:
Ben Whitehouse (Wales)

29 October 2022
19:30 NZDT (UTC+13)

New Zealand	55–3	Wales
Try: Woodman (2) 13' c, 43' c Tui 20' m Hirini 27' c Rule 38' c Connor (2) 49' m, 64' m A. Bremner 56' m Demant 68' m Con: Demant (5/7) 14', 29', 39', 45', 50'	Report	Pen: Bevan (1/1) 16'

Northland Events Centre, Whangārei
Referee: Aimee Barrett-Theron (South Africa)

FB	15	Ruby Tui
RW	14	Portia Woodman
OC	13	Stacey Fluhler	(substituted off) 63'
IC	12	Theresa Fitzpatrick
LW	11	Ayesha Leti-I'iga	(substituted off) 53'
FH	10	Ruahei Demant (c)
SH	9	Kendra Cocksedge	(substituted off) 58'
N8	8	Liana Mikaele-Tu'u
OF	7	Sarah Hirini	(substituted off) 52'
BF	6	Alana Bremner
RL	5	Chelsea Bremner
LL	4	Maia Roos	(substituted off) 62'
TP	3	Amy Rule	(substituted off) 62'
HK	2	Georgia Ponsonby	(substituted off) 47'
LP	1	Phillipa Love	(substituted off) 47'
Replacements:
HK	16	Luka Connor	(substituted in) 47'
PR	17	Krystal Murray	(substituted in) 47'
PR	18	Santo Taumata	(substituted in) 62'
LK	19	Joanah Ngan-Woo	(substituted in) 62'
FL	20	Kennedy Simon	(substituted in) 52'
SH	21	Ariana Bayler	(substituted in) 58'
FH	22	Hazel Tubic	(substituted in) 63'
FB	23	Renee Holmes	(substituted in) 53'
Coach:
(New Zealand) Wayne Smith

FB	15	Jasmine Joyce
RW	14	Lowri Norkett
OC	13	Carys Williams-Morris	(yellow card) 59'
IC	12	Hannah Jones (c)
LW	11	Lisa Neumann
FH	10	Elinor Snowsill		(substituted off) 57'
SH	9	Keira Bevan		(substituted off) 53'
N8	8	Sioned Harries		(substituted off) 40'
OF	7	Alex Callender
BF	6	Bethan Lewis
RL	5	Gwen Crabb
LL	4	Natalia John		(substituted off) 51'
TP	3	Donna Rose		(substituted off) 66'
HK	2	Carys Phillips		(substituted off) 40'
LP	1	Cara Hope		(substituted off) 50'
Replacements:
HK	16	Kelsey Jones		(substituted in) 40'
PR	17	Gwenllian Pyrs		(substituted in) 50'
PR	18	Sisilia Tuipulotu		(substituted in) 66'
LK	19	Georgia Evans		(substituted in) 40'
LK	20	Siwan Lillicrap		(substituted in) 51'
SH	21	Ffion Lewis		(substituted in) 53'
FH	22	Lleucu George	(yellow card) 67'	(substituted in) 57'
CE	23	Megan Webb		(substituted in) 63'
Coach:
(Wales) Ioan Cunningham

Player of the Match:
Theresa Fitzpatrick (New Zealand)

Assistant referees:
Aurélie Groizeleau (France)
Julianne Zussman (Canada)
Television match official:
Chris Assmus (Canada)

Notes:

- Portia Woodman (New Zealand) equalled and subsequently surpassed England's Sue Day as the all-time World Cup top try scorer when she scored her 19th and 20th tries.

30 October 2022
13:30 NZDT (UTC+13)

England	41–5	Australia
Try: Hunter 8' c M. Packer (3) 30' m, 39' c, 80' c Ward 43' m Cokayne 53' m Matthews 65' m Con: Scarratt (2/6) 9', 39'; Rowland (1/1) 80'	Report	Try: Chancellor 40' m

Waitakere Stadium, Auckland
Referee: Maggie Cogger-Orr (New Zealand)

FB	15	Helena Rowland
RW	14	Lydia Thompson
OC	13	Emily Scarratt		(substituted off) 70'
IC	12	Tatyana Heard
LW	11	Abigail Dow
FH	10	Zoe Harrison		(substituted off) 70'
SH	9	Leanne Infante		(substituted off) 62'
N8	8	Sarah Hunter (c)		(substituted off) 54'
OF	7	Marlie Packer
BF	6	Alex Matthews
RL	5	Abbie Ward		(substituted off) 67'
LL	4	Zoe Aldcroft	(yellow card) 16'
TP	3	Sarah Bern		(substituted off) 54'
HK	2	Amy Cokayne		(substituted off) 54'
LP	1	Victoria Cornborough		(substituted off) 54'
Replacements:
HK	16	Lark Davies		(substituted in) 54'
PR	17	Hannah Botterman		(substituted in) 54'
PR	18	Maud Muir		(substituted in) 54'
LK	19	Rosie Galligan		(substituted in) 67'
FL	20	Poppy Cleall		(substituted in) 54'
SH	21	Lucy Packer		(substituted in) 62'
CE	22	Holly Aitchison		(substituted in) 70'
FB	23	Ellie Kildunne		(substituted in) 70'
Coach:
(England) Simon Middleton

FB	15	Pauline Piliae-Rasabale
RW	14	Bienne Terita
OC	13	Georgie Friedrichs		(substituted off) 68'
IC	12	Sharni Williams
LW	11	Lori Cramer		(substituted off) 62'
FH	10	Arabella McKenzie
SH	9	Layne Morgan		(substituted off) 62'
N8	8	Grace Hamilton
OF	7	Shannon Parry (c)	(yellow card) 29'
BF	6	Emily Chancellor		(substituted off) 66'
RL	5	Grace Kemp
LL	4	Michaela Leonard		(substituted off) 55'
TP	3	Bridie O'Gorman		(substituted off) 50'
HK	2	Adiana Talakai		(substituted off) 67'
LP	1	Liz Patu		(substituted off) 50'
Replacements:
HK	16	Tania Naden		(substituted in) 67'
PR	17	Emily Robinson		(substituted in) 50'
PR	18	Asoiva Karpani		(substituted in) 50'
LK	19	Sera Naiqama		(substituted in) 55'
FL	20	Piper Duck		(substituted in) 66'
SH	21	Iliseva Batibasaga		(substituted in) 62'
CE	22	Cecilia Smith		(substituted in) 68'
WG	23	Mahalia Murphy		(substituted in) 62'
Coach:
(Australia) Jay Tregonning

Player of the Match:
Marlie Packer (England)

Assistant referees:
Lauren Jenner (New Zealand)
Kat Roche (United States)
Television match official:
Ben Whitehouse (Wales)

Notes:

- Sarah Hunter earned her 138th test cap, surpassing Rochelle Clark as the most capped England player and most capped female player.
- Sarah Bern (England) earned her 50th test cap.

30 October 2022
16:30 NZDT (UTC+13)

Canada	32–11	United States
Try: Hunt 16' c Paquin 20' m Farries 41' c Tessier 57' c Con: De Goede (3/4) 14', 42', 58'; Pen: De Goede (2/2) 47', 65'	Report	Try: Kitlinski 9' m Pen: Kelter (2/2) 38', 45'

Waitakere Stadium, Auckland
Referee: Joy Neville (Ireland)

FB	15	Elissa Alarie
RW	14	Maddy Grant
OC	13	Alysha Corrigan
IC	12	Sara Kaljuvee	(substituted off) 8'
LW	11	Paige Farries
FH	10	Alexandra Tessier
SH	9	Justine Pelletier
N8	8	Sophie de Goede (c)	(substituted off) 74'
OF	7	Karen Paquin	(substituted off) 71'
BF	6	Fabiola Forteza
RL	5	McKinley Hunt	(substituted off) 51'
LL	4	Courtney Holtkamp	(substituted off) 51'
TP	3	DaLeaka Menin	(substituted in) 62'
HK	2	Emily Tuttosi	(substituted off) 59'
LP	1	Olivia DeMerchant	(substituted off) 59'
Replacements:
HK	16	Gillian Boag	(substituted in) 59'
PR	17	Brittany Kassil	(substituted in) 53'
PR	18	Alex Ellis		(substituted in) 62'
LK	19	Ngalula Fuamba	(substituted in) 51'
LK	20	Tyson Beukeboom	(substituted in) 51'
FL	21	Gabby Senft	(substituted in) 74'
FL	22	Pamphinette Buisa	(substituted in) 71'
FB	23	Anaïs Holly	(substituted in) 8'
Coach:
(France) Kévin Rouet

FB	15	Tess Feury
RW	14	Jennine Detiveaux		(substituted off) 62'
OC	13	Eti Haungatau
IC	12	Alev Kelter	(yellow card) 47'
LW	11	Lotte Clapp
FH	10	Gabby Cantorna		(substituted off) 59'
SH	9	Carly Waters		(substituted off) 51'
N8	8	Kate Zackary (c)
OF	7	Rachel Johnson
BF	6	Kathryn Johnson		(substituted off) 62'
RL	5	Evelyn Ashenbrucker
LL	4	Kristine Sommer		(substituted off) 59'
TP	3	Nick James		(substituted off) 51'
HK	2	Joanna Kitlinski		(substituted off) 68'
LP	1	Hope Rogers		(substituted off) 71'
Replacements:
HK	16	Kathryn Treder		(substituted in) 68'
PR	17	Catherine Benson		(substituted in) 71'
PR	18	Charli Jacoby		(substituted in) 51'
LK	19	Jenny Kronish		(substituted in) 59'
FL	20	Elizabeth Cairns		(substituted in) 62'
SH	21	Bridget Kahele		(substituted in) 51'
CE	22	Katana Howard		(substituted in) 59'
FB	23	Meya Bizer		(substituted in) 62'
Coach:
(England) Rob Cain

Player of the Match:
Karen Paquin (Canada)

Assistant referees:
Sara Cox (England)
Clara Munarini (Italy)
Television match official:
Ian Tempest (England)

== Semi-finals ==
5 November 2022
16:30 NZDT (UTC+13)

Canada	19–26	England
Try: Paquin 19' m Corrigan 35' c Beukeboom 68' c Con: De Goede (2/3) 36', 68'	Report	Try: M. Packer 8' c Dow (2) 15' m, 50' m Con: Scarratt (1/3) 10'; Pen: Scarratt (3/3) 40', 43', 71'

Eden Park, Auckland
Referee: Aimee Barrett-Theron (South Africa)

FB	15	Elissa Alarie
RW	14	Maddy Grant
OC	13	Alysha Corrigan
IC	12	Sara Kaljuvee	(substituted off) 52'
LW	11	Paige Farries
FH	10	Alexandra Tessier
SH	9	Justine Pelletier
N8	8	Sophie de Goede (c)
OF	7	Karen Paquin
BF	6	Fabiola Forteza	(substituted off) 74'
RL	5	McKinley Hunt	(substituted off) 52'
LL	4	Courtney Holtkamp	(substituted off) 52'
TP	3	DaLeaka Menin	(substituted off) 71'
HK	2	Emily Tuttosi	(substituted off) 64'
LP	1	Olivia DeMerchant	(substituted off) 43'
Replacements:
HK	16	Gillian Boag	(substituted in) 64'
PR	17	Brittany Kassil	(substituted in) 43'
PR	18	Alex Ellis	(substituted in) 71'
LK	19	Ngalula Fuamba	(substituted in) 52'
LK	20	Tyson Beukeboom	(substituted in) 52'
FL	21	Gabby Senft
FL	22	Sara Svoboda	(substituted in) 74'
FB	23	Anaïs Holly	(substituted in) 52'
Coach:
(France) Kévin Rouet

FB	15	Helena Rowland		(substituted off) 44'
RW	14	Abigail Dow
OC	13	Emily Scarratt
IC	12	Tatyana Heard		(substituted off) 72'
LW	11	Claudia MacDonald
FH	10	Zoe Harrison
SH	9	Leanne Infante
N8	8	Sarah Hunter (c)		(substituted off) 52'
OF	7	Marlie Packer		(substituted off) 65'
BF	6	Alex Matthews
RL	5	Abbie Ward
LL	4	Zoe Aldcroft
TP	3	Sarah Bern		(substituted off) 69'
HK	2	Amy Cokayne		(substituted off) 69'
LP	1	Vickii Cornborough	(yellow card) 54'	(substituted off) 66'
Replacements:
HK	16	Lark Davies		(substituted in) 69'
PR	17	Maud Muir		(substituted in) 66'
PR	18	Shaunagh Brown		(substituted in) 69'
LK	19	Rosie Galligan
FL	20	Poppy Cleall		(substituted in) 52'
FL	21	Sadia Kabeya		(substituted in) 65'
CE	22	Holly Aitchison		(substituted in) 72'
FB	23	Ellie Kildunne		(substituted in) 44'
Coach:
(England) Simon Middleton

Player of the Match:
Zoe Aldcroft (England)

Assistant referees:
Aurélie Groizeleau (France)
Maggie Cogger-Orr (New Zealand)
Television match official:
Ben Whitehouse (Wales)

Notes:

- This was England's 30th consecutive test victory, and became the first international team to achieve this.

5 November 2022
19:30 NZDT (UTC+13)

New Zealand	25–24	France
Try: Fluhler 35' c Tui 44' m Fitzpatrick 57' c Con: Holmes (1/2) 37'; Demant (1/1) 58'; Pen: Holmes (1/2) 29'; Demant (1/1) 63'	Report	Try: R. Ménager (2) 23' c, 65' c Vernier 40' c Con: Drouin (3/3) 23', 40' +1, 66'; Pen: Drouin (1/2) 7'

Eden Park, Auckland
Referee: Joy Neville (Ireland)

FB	15	Renee Holmes		(substituted off) 59'
RW	14	Ruby Tui
OC	13	Stacey Fluhler
IC	12	Theresa Fitzpatrick
LW	11	Portia Woodman
FH	10	Ruahei Demant (c)
SH	9	Kendra Cocksedge
N8	8	Liana Mikaele-Tu'u		(substituted off) 40'
OF	7	Sarah Hirini
BF	6	Alana Bremner
RL	5	Chelsea Bremner		(substituted off) 74'
LL	4	Maia Roos
TP	3	Amy Rule		(substituted off) 67'
HK	2	Georgia Ponsonby		(substituted off) 50'
LP	1	Phillipa Love		(substituted off) 50'
Replacements:
HK	16	Luka Connor		(substituted in) 50'
PR	17	Krystal Murray		(substituted in) 50'
PR	18	Santo Taumata	(yellow card) 80'	(substituted in) 67'
LK	19	Joanah Ngan-Woo		(substituted in) 74'
FL	20	Kennedy Simon		(substituted in) 40'
SH	21	Ariana Bayler
FH	22	Hazel Tubic
WG	23	Ayesha Leti-I'iga		(substituted in) 59'
Coach:
(New Zealand) Wayne Smith

FB	15	Émilie Boulard
RW	14	Joanna Grisez
OC	13	Maëlle Filopon
IC	12	Gabrielle Vernier
LW	11	Marine Ménager
FH	10	Caroline Drouin
SH	9	Pauline Bourdon
N8	8	Romane Ménager		(substituted off) 64'
OF	7	Charlotte Escudero
BF	6	Gaëlle Hermet (c)
RL	5	Madoussou Fall		(substituted off) 64'
LL	4	Céline Ferer		(substituted off) 67'
TP	3	Clara Joyeux		(substituted off) 52'
HK	2	Agathe Sochat
LP	1	Annaëlle Deshayes		(substituted off) 56'
Replacements:
HK	16	Celia Domain
PR	17	Coco Lindelauf		(substituted in) 56'
PR	18	Assia Khalfaoui		(substituted in) 52'
LK	19	Safi N'Diaye	(yellow card) 69'	(substituted in) 64'
FL	20	Marjorie Mayans		(substituted in) 67'
SH	21	Alexandra Chambon
CE	22	Lina Queyroi
FB	23	Chloé Jacquet		(substituted in) 64'
Coach:
(France) Thomas Darracq

Player of the Match:
Sarah Hirini (New Zealand)

Assistant referees:
Sara Cox (England)
Amber McLachlan (Australia)
Television match official:
Ian Tempest (England)

== Bronze final ==
12 November 2022
16:30 NZDT (UTC+13)

Canada	0–36	France
	Report	Try: Fall 12' c Bourdon 36' c Ménager (2) 41' m, 61' c Deshayes 44' c Con: Drouin (4/5) 13', 37', 45', 62'; Pen: Drouin 21'

Eden Park, Auckland
Referee: Sara Cox (England)

FB	15	Elissa Alarie
RW	14	Maddy Grant
OC	13	Alysha Corrigan
IC	12	Sara Kaljuvee
LW	11	Paige Farries
FH	10	Alexandra Tessier
SH	9	Justine Pelletier
N8	8	Sophie de Goede (c)
OF	7	Karen Paquin
BF	6	Sara Svoboda
RL	5	McKinley Hunt
LL	4	Courtney Holtkamp
TP	3	DaLeaka Menin
HK	2	Emily Tuttosi
LP	1	Olivia DeMerchant
Replacements:
HK	16	Gillian Boag
PR	17	Brittany Kassil
PR	18	Alex Ellis
LK	19	Emma Taylor
LK	20	Tyson Beukeboom
FL	21	Gabby Senft
FL	22	Fabiola Forteza
FB	23	Anaïs Holly
Coach:
(France) Kévin Rouet

FB	15	Émilie Boulard
RW	14	Joanna Grisez
OC	13	Maëlle Filopon
IC	12	Gabrielle Vernier
LW	11	Marine Ménager
FH	10	Caroline Drouin
SH	9	Pauline Bourdon
N8	8	Romane Ménager
OF	7	Charlotte Escudero
BF	6	Gaëlle Hermet (c)
RL	5	Madoussou Fall
LL	4	Céline Ferer
TP	3	Assia Khalfaoui
HK	2	Agathe Sochat
LP	1	Annaëlle Deshayes
Replacements:
HK	16	Laure Touyé
PR	17	Célia Domain
PR	18	Clara Joyeux
LK	19	Safi N'Diaye
FL	20	Marjorie Mayans
SH	21	Alexandra Chambon
CE	22	Jessy Trémoulière
FB	23	Chloé Jacquet
Coach:
(France) Thomas Darracq

Assistant referees:
Joy Neville (Ireland)
Lauren Jenner (New Zealand)
Television match official:
Ian Tempest (England)

== Final ==
12 November 2022
19:30 NZST (UTC+13:00)

England	31–34	New Zealand
Try: Kildunne 3' c Cokayne (3) 13' c, 32' c, 54' m Packer 21' m Con: Scarratt (3/5) 4', 15', 33'	Report	Try: Ponsonby 18' c I'iga 25' c, 71' m Rule 40' m Fluhler 41' m Murray 49' m Con: Holmes (2/6) 20, 26'

Eden Park, Auckland
Attendance: 43,759
Referee: Hollie Davidson (Scotland)

FB	15	Ellie Kildunne
RW	14	Lydia Thompson	(red card) 18'
OC	13	Emily Scarratt
IC	12	Holly Aitchison
LW	11	Abby Dow		66' to 77'
FH	10	Zoe Harrison
SH	9	Lucy Packer		(substituted off) 51'
N8	8	Sarah Hunter (c)		(substituted off) 41'
OF	7	Marlie Packer		(substituted off) 51'
BF	6	Alex Matthews
RL	5	Abbie Ward
LL	4	Zoe Aldcroft		(substituted off) 27'
TP	3	Sarah Bern		(substituted off) 74'
HK	2	Amy Cokayne		(substituted off) 74'
LP	1	Vickii Cornborough		(substituted off) 74'
Replacements:
HK	16	Lark Davies		(substituted in) 74'
PR	17	Maud Muir		(substituted in) 74'
PR	18	Shaunagh Brown		(substituted in) 74'
LK	19	Catherine O'Donnell		(substituted in) 27'
N8	20	Poppy Cleall		(substituted in) 41'
FL	21	Sadia Kabeya		(substituted in) 51'
SH	22	Claudia MacDonald		(substituted in) 51'
CE	23	Tatyana Heard		(substituted in) 66'	(substituted off) 77'
Coach:
(England) Simon Middleton

FB	15	Renee Holmes
RW	14	Ruby Tui
OC	13	Stacey Fluhler		(substituted off) 71'
IC	12	Theresa Fitzpatrick
LW	11	Portia Woodman		(substituted off) 17'
FH	10	Ruahei Demant (c)
SH	9	Kendra Cocksedge
N8	8	Charmaine McMenamin		(substituted off) 51'
OF	7	Sarah Hirini
BF	6	Alana Bremner
RL	5	Chelsea Bremner
LL	4	Maia Roos		(substituted off) 64'
TP	3	Amy Rule		(substituted off) 62'
HK	2	Georgia Ponsonby		(substituted off) 47'
LP	1	Phillipa Love		(substituted off) 47'
Replacements:
HK	16	Luka Connor		(substituted in) 47'
PR	17	Krystal Murray		(substituted in) 47'
PR	18	Santo Taumata		(substituted in) 62'
LK	19	Joanah Ngan-Woo		(substituted in) 64'
FL	20	Kennedy Simon	(yellow card) 65'	(substituted in) 51'
SH	21	Ariana Bayler
FH	22	Hazel Tubic		(substituted in) 71'
WG	23	Ayesha Leti-I'iga		(substituted in) 17'
Coach:
(New Zealand) Wayne Smith

Assistant referees:
Aimee Barrett-Theron (South Africa)
Aurélie Groizeleau (France)
Television match official:
Ben Whitehouse (Wales)
