= 2022 Pacific Four Series =

International women's rugby union competition

Tournament details
- Host: New Zealand
- Date: 6–18 June
- Countries: New Zealand; Australia; United States; Canada

Final positions
- Champions: New Zealand (1st title)
- Runner-up: Canada

Tournament statistics
- Matches played: 6
- Tries scored: 31 (5.17 per match)
- Top scorer(s): (New Zealand) Ayesha Leti-I'iga (25)
- Most tries: (New Zealand) Ayesha Leti-I'iga (5)

The 2022 Pacific Four Series was the second edition of the Pacific Four Series. The competition was hosted by New Zealand from 6 to 18 June. Matches were played at two of the venues which hosted the delayed 2021 Rugby World Cup – The Trusts Arena in West Auckland and the Semenoff Stadium in Whangārei.

New Zealand won their first series title after defeating the United States 50–6 in the final round.

== Format ==
With New Zealand and Australia joining the competition alongside the United States and Canada, six matches were played in a round-robin format.

== Participants ==
Nation	Head coach	Captain
Australia	(Australia) Jay Tregonning	Shannon Parry
Canada	(France) Kevin Rouet	Sophie de Goede
New Zealand	(New Zealand) Wayne Smith	Ruahei Demant
United States	(England) Rob Cain	Kristine Sommer

== Match officials ==
On 1 June World Rugby announced the team of officials selected for the Pacific Four Series in New Zealand. All eight were announced as part of a wider squad of officials for the delayed 2021 Rugby World Cup.

- (New Zealand) Lauren Jenner
- (England) Sara Cox
- (New Zealand) Maggie Cogger-Orr
- (Australia) Amber McLachlan
- (Canada) Julianne Zussman
- (Australia) Tyler Miller
- (Canada) Chris Assmus
- (New Zealand) Lee Jeffrey

== Table ==
Pos	Team	Pld	W	D	L	PF	PA	PD	TF	TA	TB	LB	Pts
1	New Zealand	3	3	0	0	101	16	+85	16	1	3	0	15
2	Canada	3	2	0	1	58	43	+15	9	6	1	0	9
3	United States	3	1	0	2	27	100	−73	2	16	0	0	4
4	Australia	3	0	0	3	34	61	−27	4	8	0	1	1

== Fixtures ==
=== Round 1 ===
6 June 2022
12:15 NZST (UTC+12:00)

Canada (1 BP)	36–5	United States
Try: DeMerchant (2) 5' m, 29' c Buisa (2) 38' m, 52' c Holtkamp 49' m Perry 78' c Con: de Goede (3/6)	Report	Try: Taufo'ou 9' m Con: Hawkins (0/1)

Tauranga Domain, Tauranga
Referee: Lauren Jenner (New Zealand)

LP	1	Brittany Kassil	(substituted off) 65'
HK	2	Veronica Harrigan	(substituted off) 50′'
TP	3	Olivia DeMerchant	(substituted off) 69′'
LL	4	Tyson Beukeboom	(substituted off) 60′'
RL	5	Courtney Holtkamp	(substituted off) 72′'
BF	6	Pamphinette Buisa
OF	7	Sara Svoboda
N8	8	Sophie de Goede (c)
SH	9	Brianna Miller	(substituted off) 72′'
FH	10	Taylor Perry
LW	11	Paige Farries
IC	12	Alex Tessier
OC	13	Sara Kaljuvee	(substituted off) 60′'
RW	14	Sabrina Poulin	(substituted off) 60′'
FB	15	Elissa Alarie
Replacements:
HK	16	Laura Russell	(substituted on) 50′'
PR	17	Mikiela Nelson	(substituted on) 65′'
PR	18	Maya Montiel	(substituted on) 69′'
LK	19	Abby Duguid	(substituted on) 72′'
LK	20	Emma Taylor	(substituted on) 60'
SH	21	Anaїs Holly	(substituted on) 72′'
CE	22	Maddy Grant	(substituted on) 60'
WG	23	Renee Gonzalez	(substituted on) 60'
Coach:
(France) Kévin Rouet

LP	1	Catie Benson	(substituted off) 61′'
HK	2	Joanna Kitlinski	(substituted off) 69′'
TP	3	Nick James	(substituted off) 61′'
LL	4	Kristine Sommer (c)
RL	5	Evelyn Ashenbrucker	(substituted off) 50′'
BF	6	Hallie Taufo'ou
OF	7	Georgie Perris-Redding
N8	8	Kathryn Johnson	(substituted off) 62′'
SH	9	Bridget Kahele	(substituted off) 67′'
FH	10	McKenzie Hawkins	(substituted off) 65′'
LW	11	Tess Feury
IC	12	Katana Howard
OC	13	Bulou Mataitoga
RW	14	Emily Henrich
FB	15	Meya Bizer
Replacements:
HK	16	Kathryn Treder	(substituted on) 69′'
PR	17	Maya Learned	(substituted on) 61′'
PR	18	Charli Jacoby	(substituted on) 61′'
LK	19	Jordan Matyas	(substituted on) 50′'
N8	20	Elizabeth Cairns	(substituted on) 62′'
SH	21	Shelby Lin	(substituted on) 67′'
BK	22	Amy Talei Bonté
BK	23	Sam Sullivan	(substituted on) 65′'
Coach:
(England) Rob Cain

Assistant referees:
Amber McLachlan (Australia)
Tyler Miller (Australia)
Television match official:
Lee Jeffrey (New Zealand)

Notes:

- Maya Montiel of Canada made her international debut.
- Evelyn Ashenbrucker, Georgie Perris-Redding, Bridget Kahele, Shelby Lin and Sam Sullivan of the Eagles made their international debuts.

6 June 2022
14:45 NZST (UTC+12:00)

New Zealand (1 BP)	23–10	Australia
Try: Leti-L'Iga (2) 32' m, 80+1' m A. Bremner 50' m Olsen-Baker 54' m Con: Cocksedge (0/4); Pen: Cocksedge (1/1)		Try: Patu 9' m Con: Cramer (1/1); Pen: Cramer (1/1)

Tauranga Domain, Tauranga
Referee: Sara Cox (England)

LP	1	Krystal Murray	(substituted off) 46'
HK	2	Georgia Ponsonby	(substituted off) 46'
TP	3	Amy Rule	(substituted off) 46'
LL	4	Maiakawanakaulani Roos
RL	5	Chelsea Bremner	(substituted off) 53'
BF	6	Alana Bremner
OF	7	Kendra Reynolds	(substituted off) 63'
N8	8	Kaipo Olsen-Baker
SH	9	Kendra Cocksedge
FH	10	Ruahei Demant (c)
LW	11	Ayesha Leti-I'iga
IC	12	Chelsea Semple	(substituted off) 45'
OC	13	Kelsey Teneti
RW	14	Ruby Tui
FB	15	Renee Holmes	(substituted off) 65'
Replacements:
HK	16	Luka Connor	(substituted on) 46'
PR	17	Angel Mulu	(substituted on) 46'
PR	18	Tanya Kalounivale	(substituted on) 46'
LK	19	Joanah Ngan-Woo	(substituted on) 53'
LF	20	Tafito Lafaele	(substituted on) 63'
SH	21	Arihiana Marino-Tauhinu
OB	22	Hazel Tubic	(substituted on) 45'
OB	23	Cheyelle Robins-Reti	(substituted on) 65'
Coach:
(New Zealand) Wayne Smith

LP	1	Liz Patu	(substituted off) 56'
HK	2	Adiana Talakai	(substituted off) 21'
TP	3	Bridie O'Gorman	(substituted off) 56'
LL	4	Michaela Leonard
RL	5	Kaitlan Leaney	(substituted off) 71'
BF	6	Emily Chancellor	(substituted off) 63'
OF	7	Shannon Parry (c)
N8	8	Grace Hamilton
SH	9	Iliseva Batibasaga	(substituted off) 56'
FH	10	Trilleen Pomare
LW	11	Ivania Wong	(substituted off) 71'
IC	12	Pauline Piliae-Rasabale	(substituted off) 56'
OC	13	Georgina Friedrichs
RW	14	Mahalia Murphy
FB	15	Lori Cramer
Replacements:
HK	16	Ashley Marsters	(substituted on) 21'
PR	17	Madison Schuck	(substituted on) 56'
PR	18	Eva Karpani	(substituted on) 56'
LK	19	Annabelle Codey	(substituted on) 71'
LF	20	Piper Duck	(substituted on) 63'
SH	21	Layne Morgan	(substituted on) 56'
CE	22	Cecilia Smith	(substituted on) 71'
FH	23	Arabella McKenzie	(substituted on) 56'
Coach:
(Australia) Jay Tregonning

Assistant referees:
Julianne Zussman (Canada)
Maggie Cogger-Orr (New Zealand)
Television match official:
Chris Assmus (Canada)

Notes:

- Ruahei Demant captained the Black Ferns for the first time.
- Kendra Cocksedge became the most capped Black Fern with 58 caps, it was her 50th consecutive Test.
- Annabelle Codey and Cecilia Smith made their Wallaroos test debut.

=== Round 2 ===
12 June 2022
12:45 NZST (UTC+12:00)

United States	16–14	Australia
Try: Rogers 35' m Con: Cantorna (1/1); Pen: Cantorna (3/3)		Try: Friedrichs 60' m Marsters 71' m Con: Cramer (2/2)

The Trusts Arena, West Auckland
Referee: Maggie Cogger-Orr (New Zealand)

LP	1	Hope Rogers	(substituted off) 56'
HK	2	Joanna Kitlinski
TP	3	Nick James	(substituted off) 56'
LL	4	Jordan Matyas
RL	5	Hallie Taufo'ou	(substituted off) 68'
BF	6	Elizabeth Cairns	(substituted off) 66'
OF	7	Rachel Johnson
N8	8	Kate Zackary (c)
SH	9	Bridget Kahele	(substituted off) 72'
FH	10	Gabby Cantorna	(substituted off) 73'
LW	11	Jennine Detiveaux
IC	12	Katana Howard
OC	13	Alev Kelter
RW	14	Charlotte Clapp
FB	15	Bulou Mataitoga
Replacements:
HK	16	Kathryn Treder
PR	17	Maya Learned	(substituted on) 56'
PR	18	Charli Jacoby	(substituted on) 56'
LK	19	Kristine Sommer	(substituted on) 68'
LF	20	Kathryn Johnson	(substituted on) 66'
SH	21	Carly Waters	(substituted on) 72'
FH	22	Megan Foster	(substituted on) 73'
FB	23	Tess Feury
Coach:
(England) Rob Cain

LP	1	Liz Patu	(substituted off) 46'
HK	2	Ashley Marsters	(substituted off) 72'
TP	3	Bridie O'Gorman	(substituted off) 46'
LL	4	Michaela Leonard
RL	5	Kaitlan Leaney	(substituted off) 71'
BF	6	Emily Chancellor	(substituted off) 56'	(yellow card) 32' to 42'
OF	7	Shannon Parry (c)
N8	8	Grace Hamilton
SH	9	Iliseva Batibasaga	(substituted off) 56'
FH	10	Trilleen Pomare	(substituted off) 66'
LW	11	Jemima McCalman
IC	12	Pauline Piliae-Rasabale	(substituted off) 48'
OC	13	Georgina Friedrichs
RW	14	Mahalia Murphy
FB	15	Lori Cramer
Replacements:
HK	16	Tiarna Molloy	(substituted on) 72'
PR	17	Madison Schuck	(substituted on) 46'
PR	18	Eva Karpani	(substituted on) 46'
LK	19	Annabelle Codey	(substituted on) 71'
LF	20	Piper Duck	(substituted on) 56'
SH	21	Layne Morgan	(substituted on) 56'
CE	22	Cecilia Smith	(substituted on) 66'
FH	23	Arabella McKenzie	(substituted on) 48'
Coach:
(Australia) Jay Tregonning

Player of the Match:
Hope Rogers
Assistant referees:
Julianne Zussman (Canada)
Chris Assmus (Canada)
Television match official:
Lee Jeffrey (New Zealand)

Notes:

- Charlotte Clapp made her test debut for the Eagles, she previously played for England's fifteens and sevens teams.
- Ashley Marsters and Jemima McCalman were named in the starting line-up to replace Liz Patu and Ivania Wong who were ruled out due to injury. Tiarna Molloy made her test debut for the Wallaroos.

12 June 2022
14:45 NZST (UTC+12:00)

Canada	0–28	New Zealand (1 BP)
		Try: Tui (2) 47' m, 77' m Roos 62' m C. Bremner 75' m Con: Tubic (0/1); Demant (1/3); Pen: Tubic (2/2)

The Trusts Arena, West Auckland
Referee: Amber McLachlan (Australia)

LP	1	Olivia DeMerchant	(substituted off) 57'
HK	2	Emily Tuttosi	(substituted off) 38' (substituted on) 40' (substituted off) 69'
TP	3	DaLeaka Menin	(substituted off) 78'
LL	4	Tyson Beukeboom	(substituted off) 52'
RL	5	Courtney Holtkamp	(substituted off) 58'
BF	6	Pamphinette Buisa
OF	7	Sara Svoboda
N8	8	Sophie de Goede (c)
SH	9	Brianna Miller	(substituted off) 61'
FH	10	Taylor Perry
LW	11	Paige Farries	(substituted off) 74'
IC	12	Alex Tessier
OC	13	Sara Kaljuvee
RW	14	Renee Gonzalez	(substituted off) 46'
FB	15	Elissa Alarie
Replacements:
HK	16	Veronica Harrigan	(substituted on) 38' (substituted off) 40' (substituted on) 69'
PR	17	Brittany Kassil	(substituted on) 57'
PR	18	Maya Montiel	(substituted on) 78'
LK	19	Abby Duguid	(substituted on) 58'
LK	20	McKinley Hunt	(substituted on) 52'
SH	21	Anaїs Holly	(substituted on) 74'
FH	22	Maddy Grant	(substituted on) 61'
FB	23	Alysha Corrigan	(substituted on) 46'
Coach:
(France) Kevin Rouet

LP	1	Pip Love	(substituted off) 51'
HK	2	Luka Connor	(substituted off) 51'
TP	3	Tanya Kalounivale	(substituted off) 51'	(yellow card) 30' to 40'
LL	4	Maiakawanakaulani Roos
RL	5	Joanah Ngan-Woo	(substituted off) 66'
BF	6	Alana Bremner
OF	7	Tafito Lafaele	(substituted off) 55'
N8	8	Kaipo Olsen-Baker		(yellow card) 53' to 63'
SH	9	Kendra Cocksedge	(substituted off) 61'
FH	10	Hazel Tubic	(substituted off) 51'
LW	11	Ayesha Leti-I'iga
IC	12	Ruahei Demant (c)
OC	13	Amy du Plessis
RW	14	Ruby Tui
FB	15	Cheyelle Robins-Reti	(substituted off) 63'
Replacements:
HK	16	Georgia Ponsonby	(substituted on) 51'
PR	17	Angel Mulu	(substituted on) 51'
PR	18	Amy Rule	(substituted on) 51'
LK	19	Chelsea Bremner	(substituted on) 66'
LF	20	Liana Mikaele-Tu'u	(substituted on) 55'
SH	21	Arihiana Marino-Tauhinu	(substituted on) 61'
CE	22	Sylvia Brunt	(substituted on) 51'
FH	23	Renee Wickliffe	(substituted on) 63'
Coach:
(New Zealand) Wayne Smith

Assistant referees:
Lauren Jenner (New Zealand)
Tyler Miller (Australia)
Television match official:
Sara Cox (England)

Notes:

- Sylvia Brunt and Amy du Plessis made their Black Ferns test debuts.

=== Round 3 ===
18 June 2022
13:30 NZST (UTC+12:00)

Australia (1 BP)	10–22	Canada
Try: Marsters 4' m Con: Cramer (1/1); Pen: Cramer (1/1)		Try: Tuttosi 39' m Pelletier 45' m Ellis 78' m Con: de Goede (2/3); Pen: de Goede (1/1)

Semenoff Stadium, Whangārei
Referee: Lauren Jenner (New Zealand)

LP	1	Liz Patu	(substituted off) 51' (substituted on) 74'
HK	2	Ashley Marsters
TP	3	Bridie O'Gorman	(substituted off) 51'
LL	4	Michaela Leonard
RL	5	Kaitlan Leaney	(substituted off) 51'
BF	6	Piper Duck	(substituted off) 74'
OF	7	Shannon Parry (c)
N8	8	Grace Hamilton	(substituted off) 51'
SH	9	Layne Morgan	(substituted off) 51'
FH	10	Arabella McKenzie
LW	11	Lori Cramer
IC	12	Cecilia Smith	(substituted off) 51'
OC	13	Georgina Friedrichs
RW	14	Jemima McCalman	(substituted off) 56'
FB	15	Pauline Piliae-Rasabale
Replacements:
HK	16	Tiarna Molloy
PR	17	Madison Schuck	(substituted on) 51'	(yellow card) 71' to end'
PR	18	Eva Karpani	(substituted on) 51'
LK	19	Sera Naiqama	(substituted on) 51'
LF	20	Grace Kemp	(substituted on) 51'
SH	21	Iliseva Batibasaga	(substituted on) 51'
FH	22	Trilleen Pomare	(substituted on) 51'
FB	23	Mahalia Murphy	(substituted on) 56'
Coach:
(Australia) Jay Tregonning

LP	1	Olivia DeMerchant	(substituted off) 49'
HK	2	Emily Tuttosi	(substituted off) 58'
TP	3	DaLeaka Menin	(substituted off) 58'
LL	4	Tyson Beukeboom	(substituted off) 45'
RL	5	Abby Duguid	(substituted off) 45'
BF	6	Gabrielle Senft	(substituted off) 65'
OF	7	Pamphinette Buisa
N8	8	Sophie de Goede (c)
SH	9	Justine Pelletier	(substituted off) 59'
FH	10	Taylor Perry
LW	11	Paige Farries
IC	12	Alex Tessier	(substituted off) 69'
OC	13	Sara Kaljuvee
RW	14	Alysha Corrigan
FB	15	Elissa Alarie
Replacements:
HK	16	Laura Russell	(substituted on) 58'
PR	17	Brittany Kassil	(substituted on) 49'
PR	18	Alex Ellis	(substituted on) 58'
LK	19	Emma Taylor	(substituted on) 45'
LF	20	McKinley Hunt	(substituted on) 45'
SH	21	Sara Svoboda	(substituted on) 65'
CE	22	Brianna Miller	(substituted on) 59'
FH	23	Maddy Grant	(substituted on) 69'
Coach:
(France) Kevin Rouet

Assistant referees:
Sara Cox (England)
Maggie Cogger-Orr (New Zealand)
Television match official:
Lee Jeffrey (New Zealand)

Notes:

- Piper Duck, Layne Morgan and Cecilia Smith of the Wallaroos got their first test starts while Grace Kemp made her test debut.
- Abby Duguid of Canada made her first test start.

18 June 2022
16:00 NZST (UTC+12:00)

New Zealand (1 BP)	50–6	United States
Try: Leti-I'iga (3) 2' m, 23' m, 59' m Marino-Tauhinu 6' m Holmes 31' m Brunt 40' m Reynolds 51' m Wickliffe 78' m Con: Demant (1/3); Holmes (1/1); Tubic (3/4)		Pen: Foster (2/2)

Semenoff Stadium, Whangārei
Referee: Julianne Zussman (Canada)

LP	1	Pip Love	(substituted off) 40'
HK	2	Natalie Delamere	(substituted off) 49'
TP	3	Leilani Perese	(substituted off) 40'
LL	4	Joanah Ngan-Woo
RL	5	Chelsea Bremner
BF	6	Alana Bremner
OF	7	Kendra Reynolds	(substituted off) 53'
N8	8	Liana Mikaele-Tu'u
SH	9	Arihiana Marino-Tauhinu	(substituted off) 61'
FH	10	Ruahei Demant (c)	(substituted off) 32'
LW	11	Ayesha Leti-I'iga
IC	12	Sylvia Brunt
OC	13	Amy du Plessis	(substituted off) 53'
RW	14	Renee Wickliffe
FB	15	Renee Holmes
Replacements:
HK	16	Georgia Ponsonby	(substituted on) 49'
PR	17	Krystal Murray	(substituted on) 40'	(yellow card) 74' to end'
PR	18	Lucy Anderson	(substituted on) 40'
LK	19	Maia Roos	(substituted on) 53'
LF	20	Tafito Lafaele
SH	21	Kendra Cocksedge	(substituted on) 61'
CE	22	Chelsea Semple	(substituted on) 53'
FB	23	Hazel Tubic	(substituted on) 32'
Coach:
(New Zealand) Wayne Smith

LP	1	Hope Rogers	(substituted off) 66'
HK	2	Joanna Kitlinski	(substituted off) 66'
TP	3	Nick James	(substituted off) 52'
LL	4	Jordan Matyas
RL	5	Kristine Sommer	(substituted off) 62'
BF	6	Elizabeth Cairns	(substituted off) 48'
OF	7	Rachel Johnson
N8	8	Kate Zackary (c)
SH	9	Carly Waters	(substituted off) 62'
FH	10	Megan Foster	(substituted off) 57'
LW	11	Charlotte Clapp
IC	12	Katana Howard	(substituted off) 60'
OC	13	Alev Kelter
RW	14	Tess Feury
FB	15	Bulou Mataitoga
Replacements:
HK	16	Kathryn Treder	(substituted on) 66'
PR	17	Maya Learned	(substituted on) 66'
PR	18	Charli Jacoby	(substituted on) 52'
LK	19	Evelyn Ashenbrucker	(substituted on) 62'
LF	20	Georgie Perris-Redding	(substituted on) 48'
SH	21	Bridget Kahele	(substituted on) 62'
FH	22	Gabby Cantorna	(substituted on) 57'
FB	23	Meya Bizer	(substituted on) 60'
Coach:
(England) Rob Cain

Assistant referees:
Amber McLachlan (Australia)
Tyler Miller (Australia)
Television match official:
Chris Assmus (Canada)

Notes:

- For the Black Ferns, Natalie Delamere and Lucy Anderson made their test debut with Sylvia Brunt getting her first start.

== Player statistics ==
=== Most points ===
Rank	Name	Team	Points
1	Ayesha Leti-I'iga	New Zealand	25
2	Lori Cramer	Australia	14
3	Sophie de Goede	Canada	13
4	Hazel Tubic	New Zealand	12
5	Gabby Cantorna	United States	11
6	Pamphinette Buisa	Canada	10
6	Olivia DeMerchant	Canada	10
6	Ashley Marsters	Australia	10
6	Ruby Tui	New Zealand	10
10	Renee Holmes	New Zealand	7

=== Most tries ===
Rank	Name	Team	Tries
1	Ayesha Leti-I'iga	New Zealand	5
2	Pamphinette Buisa	Canada	2
2	Olivia DeMerchant	Canada	2
2	Ashley Marsters	Australia	2
2	Ruby Tui	New Zealand	2
6	18 players		1

== Broadcast ==
All the Pacific Four Series matches were broadcast live in New Zealand on Spark Sport.
