= Elizabeth Cairns =

Elizabeth Cairns may refer to:

- Elizabeth Cairns (memoirist) (1685–1714), Scottish Calvinist lay preacher and memoirist
- Elizabeth Cairns (rugby union) (born 1992), American rugby union player
