= Veronica Harrigan =

Canadian rugby union player

- Height: 5 ft 7 in (170 cm)

Rugby union career
- Position: Hooker
Senior career
Years	Team	Apps	(Points)
	Brantford Harlequins		(0)
International career
Years	Team	Apps	(Points)
2022	Canada	13	(0)

Veronica Harrigan is a Canadian rugby union player. She plays at Hooker for Canada and the Brantford Harlequins.

== Rugby career ==
Harrigan began her rugby career in Grade 9 at Medway High School. She made the Ontario 7s U18 team in Grade 10. She studied Sociology and Criminology at King's University College.

In 2017, She was selected in Canada's November Series against England.

Harrigan was named in the Canadian team that competed in the Pacific Four Series in New Zealand. She was called into the Canadian squad for the delayed 2021 Rugby World Cup as a late replacement for Laura Russell, who had been ruled out due to injury before the tournament began.

=== Suspension ===
In 2022, Harrigan received a two-month suspension from World Rugby after testing positive for the banned substance spironolactone. The drug was administered by her family physician without obtaining a therapeutic use exemption, although the violation was deemed unintentional. She was cleared to play again on October 4.
