= Lillyann Mason-Spice =

Rugby union career
- Position: Wing
Senior career
Years	Team	Apps	(Points)
	Brumbies		(0)
International career
Years	Team	Apps	(Points)
	Australia		(0)

Lillyann Mason-Spice is an Australian rugby union player. She plays for the Brumbies in the Super W competition.

== Biography ==
In 2019, Mason-Spice was selected to represent Australian A at the Oceania Rugby Championship in Fiji. She scored a try for the side in their win against Samoa.

In 2022, Mason-Spice represented the Australian Barbarians team against Japan who were on tour in Australia. She was later named in the Australian squad for the 2022 Pacific Four Series in New Zealand.
