= Amy Bonté =

American rugby union player (born 1990)

- Full name: Amy Talei Bonté
- Born: November 20, 1990 (age 35)
- Height: 5 ft 7 in (1.70 m)
- Weight: 155 lb (70 kg)

Rugby union career
- Position: Center
International career
Years	Team	Apps	(Points)
2015–Present	United States	9	(0)

Amy Talei Bonté (born November 20, 1990) is an American rugby union player. She made her international debut for the United States against New Zealand in July 2015.

In 2021, Bonté featured for the Eagles against Canada in the second match of the Pacific Four Series. She was named in the Eagles squad for their November test series.

Bonté was called into the Eagles squad for the 2022 Pacific Four Series in New Zealand.
