= Madison Schuck =

Australia international rugby union player

- Born: 8 October 1991 (age 35) Brisbane
- Height: 1.66 m (5 ft 5 in)
- Weight: 76 kg (168 lb)
- School: Alexandra Hills State High School

Rugby union career
- Position: Prop
Senior career
Years	Team	Apps	(Points)
	Queensland Reds		(0)
International career
Years	Team	Apps	(Points)
2022	Australia	5	(0)

Madison Schuck (born 8 October 1991) is an Australian rugby union player. She plays Prop for Australia internationally, and for the Queensland Reds in the Super W competition.

== Rugby career ==
=== 2022 ===
Schuck was one of eleven players who made their international debut for Australia against Fiji on 6 May 2022 at the Suncorp Stadium in Brisbane. She then started in her second appearance against Japan at the Bond Sports Park in Gold Coast.

Schuck was named in the Wallaroos squad for the 2022 Pacific Four Series. She came off the bench against the Black Ferns in the opening match of the Pacific Four series on 6 June. She was later named in the Wallaroos squad for a two-test series against the Black Ferns at the Laurie O'Reilly Cup.

Schuck was also selected in the Wallaroos side for the delayed 2022 Rugby World Cup in New Zealand.

=== 2023 ===
Schuck made the Wallaroos side again for the 2023 Pacific Four Series, and the O'Reilly Cup.
