= Elizabeth Cairns (memoirist) =

Scottish memoirist (1685–1741)

Elizabeth Cairns (1685 – 1741) was a working-class Scottish Calvinist lay preacher and memoirist.

Cairns was born in Blackford, the daughter of an impoverished Scottish Covenanter shepherd. From the age of five she and her sister needed to look after sheep without supervision. At different times she worked as a shepherd, servant and schoolteacher. Her memoirs recorded her life as a spiritual journey, in which she was sustained by mystical and visionary encounters.

== Works ==
- Memoirs of the life of Elizabeth Cairns written by herself some years before her death; and now taken from her own original copy with great care and diligence . Glasgow: printed for, and sold by John Greig sadler there, and at Edinburgh, Perth and Stirling. 1762.
