= Gillian Florence =

Canadian rugby union player

- Born: 30 April 1975 (age 51) Hudson, Quebec
- School: Hudson High; John Abbott College
- University: McGill University
- Occupation: Technical writer

Rugby union career
- Position: Flanker
Youth career
- 1987–1992: Hudson High
Amateur team(s)
Years	Team	Apps	(Points)
1989–2011	Ste. Anne de Bellevue RFC		(0)
1992?–1994?	Lady Islanders		(0)
1995–1996	McGill Marlets		(0)
2017–	Nova Scotia Keltics		(0)
Provincial / State sides
Years	Team	Apps	(Points)
1993–2011	Quebec		(0)
International career
Years	Team	Apps	(Points)
1994–2011	Canada	67	(0)
Coaching career
- Years: Team
- 2008–?: McGill Marlets
- 2012–2013: Ste. Anne de Bellevue RFC

Gillian Florence (born 30 April 1975) is a former Canadian rugby union player who has participated in five Rugby World Cups (1994, 1998, 2002, 2006, and 2010). Starting out as a prop on the national team, she became one of Canada's top flankers.

== Rugby career ==
Florence first started playing rugby in high school (1987–1992) in Grade ten and John Abbott College (1992–1994). She made her international debut at the 1994 Women's Rugby World Cup in Scotland, at the age of 18, and retired in 2011. She represented Quebec for eighteen years and played for Ste. Anne de Bellevue for twenty-two years.

Having played one season with McGill University in 1995–1996, her national schedule conflicted with the university team's schedule.

She was a member of the World XV that played against the New Zealand Black Ferns in 2003.

Florence became an assistant coach for the McGill Marlets in 2008, a decade after graduating.

In 2011, Florence, along with Brooke Hilditch and Megan Gibbs protested Canada's "pay-to-play" system for women in non-World Cup years by refusing to pay the $2,900 to play in the 2011 Nations Cup. After retiring, she coached her club, Ste Anne de Bellevue, in 2012 and 2013. She is now on the Monty Heald Fund committee which aims to eliminate the "pay to play" experience.

She returned to the rugby pitch in 2017 and suited up for the Nova Scotia Keltics.

== Honours ==
- 1995 CIS All-Conference honours
- 1998 named one of McGill's top 20 athletes of all time (McGill Tribune)
- 1994 World Cup game MVP at her test debut
- 2003 All World team
- 2017 Rugby Canada Hall of Fame inductee (first woman in the hall of fame)
- 2018 John Abbott College Hall of Fame inductee

An annual Rugby Canada award is named in her honour and is given to a "player who best represents the qualities of Canadian rugby as voted by her teammates." Recipients include Andrea Burk (2014), Barbara Mervin (2015), Julianne Zussman (2016), Kelly Russell (2017), Laura Russell (2018) and Olivia DeMerchant (2019).

== Personal life ==
In 1998, she graduated from McGill University with a bachelor's degree in Education. In Montreal she worked for Caterpillar, for Ultra Electronics in Nova Scotia, and now Kinduct in Halifax. She moved to rural Nova Scotia when she was eight months pregnant. She lives with her partner, firefighter Aaron Graham, is mother of two children.
