= Lucy Anderson (rugby union) =

New Zealand rugby union player

- Born: 18 May 1991 (age 35)
- Height: 1.76 m (5 ft 9 in)
- Weight: 95 kg (209 lb)

Rugby union career
- Position: Prop
Provincial / State sides
Years	Team	Apps	(Points)
2011, 2013	Otago	12	(15)
2014–2022	Canterbury	65	(115)
Super Rugby
Years	Team	Apps	(Points)
2022	Matatū	3	(0)
International career
Years	Team	Apps	(Points)
2022	New Zealand	1	(0)

Lucy Anderson (born 18 May 1991) is a New Zealand rugby union player.

== Career ==
Anderson injured her right knee skiing in 2007 and had to have a full reconstruction of her ACL joint. In 2012, she had cartilage taken out of her right knee and her left knee also had a full ACL reconstruction because of a rugby injury.

Outside of rugby, Anderson worked in the occupational therapy department at Christchurch Hospital. During her time playing for Canterbury, she has played in the midfield before switching to the back row, and then to the front row. She had been in the Black Ferns wider training squad since she was 19, but had never made the side.

Anderson was named in the Matatū squad for the inaugural 2022 Super Rugby Aupiki season. She was selected for the Black Ferns squad for the 2022 Pacific Four Series. She made her international debut on 18 June 2022 against the United States at Whangārei.
