= Jordan Matyas =

American rugby union player

- Born: July 2, 1993 (age 33)
- Height: 6 ft 0 in (183 cm)
- Weight: 195 lb (88 kg)
- School: Centennial High School
- University: Brigham Young University

Rugby union career
- Position: Loose forward (Number 8)
International career
| Years | Team | Apps | (Points) |
| 2016 | United States | 18 | (0) |
National sevens team
| Years | Team | | Comps |
| 2017 | United States | | |

Jordan Matyas borned Gray in July 2, 1993 is an American rugby union player.

== Background ==
Matyas attended Brigham Young University where she majored in Exercise Science.

== Rugby career ==
=== 2016–17 ===
Originally from Canada, she made her debut for the United States in 2016. She was named in the Eagles 2017 Women's Rugby World Cup squad.

=== 2022 ===
In 2022, Matyas was named in the Eagles squad for the Pacific Four Series in New Zealand. She was later named in the Eagles squad to the 2021 Rugby World Cup in New Zealand.

== Private life ==
In April 2018, Jordan Matyas became engaged to Ryan Matyas, a United States international rugby union and rugby sevens player. The couple married later that year, in August. On June 7, 2025, the couple announced the birth of their son on their Instagram accounts.
