= Tafito Lafaele =

NZ international rugby union & league player

- Born: 17 February 2001 (age 25) Auckland, New Zealand
- Height: 1.75 m (5 ft 9 in)
- Weight: 87 kg (13 st 10 lb)
- School: Botany Downs Secondary College

Rugby union career
- Position: Flanker
Amateur team(s)
Years	Team	Apps	(Points)
	Papatoetoe		(0)
Provincial / State sides
Years	Team	Apps	(Points)
2019–2022	Auckland Storm	12	(15)
Super Rugby
Years	Team	Apps	(Points)
2022–2024	Blues Women	11	(20)
2026–	Blues Women		
International career
Years	Team	Apps	(Points)
2022	New Zealand	2	(0)
- Rugby league career

Playing information
- Position: Prop, Second-row
Club
Years	Team	Pld	T	G	FG	P
2023–25	Brisbane Broncos	14	1	0	0	4
- As of 13 November 2026

Tafito Lafaele (born 17 February 2001) is a New Zealand rugby league & rugby union player. She made her Black Ferns test debut in 2022. She played for the Blues Women in the Super Rugby Aupiki competition and represented Auckland provincially. She joined the Brisbane Broncos NRLW squad in 2023, making her debut on August 27 against the Canberra Raiders.

== Background ==
Lafaele attended Botany Downs Secondary College where she participated in athletics, volleyball, basketball, netball and sevens.

== Rugby career ==
=== 2019–21 ===
Lafaele debuted for the Auckland Storm in the 2019 Farah Palmer Cup. In 2021 she played for the Moana Pasifika Sevens team against the Black Ferns and Black Ferns Sevens.

On 3 November 2021, Lafaele was named in the Blues squad for the inaugural Super Rugby Aupiki competition. She was named in the Blues starting line up for their first game against Matatū, they won 21–10. She also started in their 0–35 thrashing by the Chiefs Manawa in the final round.

=== 2022 ===
Lafaele was named in the Black Ferns squad for the 2022 Pacific Four Series. She made her international debut on 6 June against Australia at Tauranga at the Pacific Four Series. She was recalled into the team for the August test series against the Wallaroos for the Laurie O'Reilly Cup.
