= Tyson Beukeboom =

Canadian rugby union player (born 1991)

- Born: 10 March 1991 (age 35) Edmonton, Alberta, Canada
- Height: 1.82 m (6 ft 0 in)
- Weight: 78 kg (172 lb)
- University: St. Francis Xavier University
- Notable relative: Jeff Beukeboom (father)

Rugby union career
- Position: Lock
- Current team: Trailfinders Women
Amateur team(s)
Years	Team	Apps	(Points)
–	Aurora Barbarians		
–	St. Francis X-Women		
Senior career
Years	Team	Apps	(Points)
2023-	Trailfinders Women		
International career
Years	Team	Apps	(Points)
2013–present	Canada	83	(75)
- Correct as of 2025-09-27
Medal record
Women's rugby union
Representing Canada
World Cup
Silver medal – second place	2014 France	Team competition
Silver medal – second place	2025 England	Team competition

Tyson Taylor Beukeboom (born 10 March 1991) is a Canadian rugby union player. She has represented Canada at four consecutive Rugby World Cups, starting with the silver medal-winning squad of 2014; and also at the 2017, 2021, and 2025 tournaments.

== Early life ==
Beukeboom is the daughter of former NHL ice hockey player Jeff Beukeboom. She was born in Edmonton, Alberta, during her father's fifth season with the Edmonton Oilers. She attended St. Francis Xavier University.

== Rugby career ==
In 2012, Beukeboom was named the CIS Female Athlete of the Year. She made her debut as a member of Canada‘s national team at the 2013 Nations Cup, and was a member of Canada's squad at the 2014 Rugby World Cup in France where her side were runners-up.

Beukeboom was selected in Canada's squad for the 2017 Rugby World Cup in Ireland. In 2018, she earned her 33rd cap against England in Doncaster.

Beukeboom was named in the Canadian squad for the 2021 Rugby World Cup that was delayed to 2022 due to the COVID-19 pandemic. In 2023, She was named in Canada's squad for their test against the Springbok women and for the Pacific Four Series. She started in Canada's 66–7 thrashing of South Africa in Madrid, Spain.

In July 2023, she started in her side's Pacific Four loss to the Black Ferns, they went down 21–52. Beukeboom scored a hat-trick in her 60th appearance, against Australia in her side's final match of the series.

In 2024, she made her 68th test appearance and surpassed former Canadian international, Gillian Florence, as the most capped Canadian women's rugby player.

She was selected in Canada's squad for the 2025 Pacific Four Series. In July 2025, she was named in the Canadian side to the Rugby World Cup in England.
