= Bridget Kahele =

- Born: 1 August 1996 (age 30) Aldie, Virginia, United States
- Height: 5 ft 6 in (168 cm)
- Weight: 154 lb (70 kg)

Rugby union career
- Position: Scrumhalf
International career
| Years | Team | Apps | (Points) |
| 2022 | United States | 3 | (0) |

Bridget Kahele (born 1 August 1996) is an American rugby union player. She debuted for the Eagles in 2022 and competed at the 2021 Rugby World Cup.

== Rugby career ==
Kahele was named in the United States squad to the 2022 Pacific Four Series in New Zealand. She made her international debut against Canada in the opening game of the tournament. She also started in their narrow 16–14 victory over Australia in her second appearance. She came off the bench when the Eagles faced the Black Ferns in her third match.

Kahele was selected in the Eagles squad for the delayed 2021 Rugby World Cup in New Zealand.
