= Liz Patu =

Australian rugby union player (born 1989)

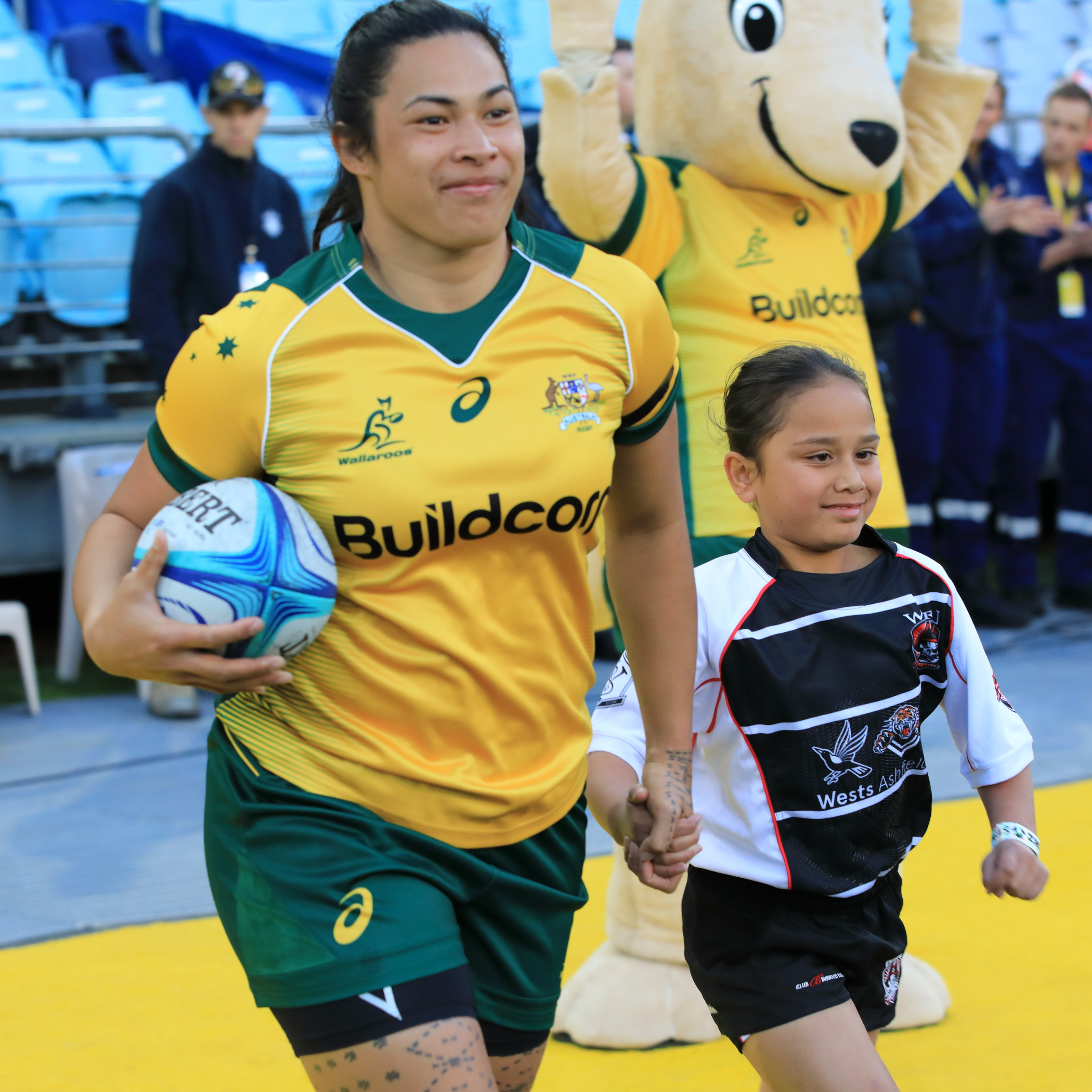
- Liz Patu walking onto the pitch to play against New Zealand, August 2018
- Born: 15 July 1989 (age 37) Auckland, New Zealand
- Height: 1.68 m (5 ft 6 in)
- Weight: 94 kg (207 lb)

Rugby union career
- Position: Prop
Senior career
Years	Team	Apps	(Points)
	Queensland Reds		(0)
International career
Years	Team	Apps	(Points)
2014–2022	Australia	33	(0)

Liz Patu (born 15 July 1989) is an Australian rugby union player. She appeared in three Rugby World Cups for Australia, in 2014, 2017 and at the delayed 2021 tournament. She played Prop for the Queensland Reds in the Super W competition.

== Early life ==
Patu was born in Auckland but was raised in her native Samoa. She later migrated to Australia in 2004.

== Rugby career ==
Patu She made her international debut against New Zealand in 2014. She was selected for the Wallaroos 2014 Rugby World Cup squad. She also competed at the 2017 Rugby World Cup in Ireland.

Patu played against Japan who had not played a game since 2017. In 2018 she was named as captain ahead of their Test series against New Zealand. She featured again for Australia in 2019 against New Zealand in two test matches.

In 2019 Patu was given a six-week ban for biting Wallaroos team-mate Rebecca Clough in a Super W match.

Patu was named in Australia's squad for the 2022 Pacific Four Series in New Zealand. She was named in the Wallaroos squad for a two-test series against the Black Ferns for the Laurie O'Reilly Cup.

Patu appeared in her third, and final, Rugby World Cup when she was selected in the team for the delayed tournament in New Zealand. She later announced her retirement from the Wallaroos in December.
