= Megan Foster =

- Born: April 24, 1992 (age 34) Davis, California, United States
- Height: 5 ft 7 in (170 cm)
- Weight: 150 lb (68 kg)

Rugby union career
- Position: Flyhalf
Senior career
Years	Team	Apps	(Points)
2021–Present	Exeter Chiefs	11	(62)
International career
Years	Team	Apps	(Points)
2016–Present	United States	11	(0)
National sevens team
Years	Team		Comps
2017	United States		

Megan Foster (born April 24, 1992) is an American rugby union player. She is a Flyhalf for the United States and Exeter Chiefs.

Foster played soccer for Chico State University before deciding to give rugby a try, She later switched to rugby in her second year of college.

Foster made her debut for the Eagles against Canada in the 2016 Women's Rugby Super Series in July. She also debuted for the Eagles sevens team at the Dubai sevens in 2017. In 2021, She joined Exeter Chiefs in the Premier 15s. She previously played for the San Diego Surfers in the Women's Premier League. She was named in the Eagles 2021 Autumn tour and played against Canada, England, and Ireland.

Foster was selected in the Eagles squad for the 2021 Rugby World Cup in New Zealand.
