= Grace Hamilton (rugby) =

Australian rugby union and rugby league footballer

Personal information
- Born: 4 March 1992 (age 34) Orange, New South Wales, Australia
- Height: 177 cm (5 ft 10 in)
- Weight: 77 kg (12 st 2 lb)

Playing information

Rugby union
- Position: Flanker
Club
Years	Team	Pld	T	G	FG	P
2018–	NSW Waratahs	14	8	0	0	40
Representative
Years	Team	Pld	T	G	FG	P
2016–19	Australia	26	0	0	0	0

Rugby league
- Position: Prop
Club
Years	Team	Pld	T	G	FG	P
2020–23	Sydney Roosters	10	0	0	0	0
- Source: RLP As of 6 November 2026

Grace Hamilton (born 4 March 1992) is an Australian rugby union and rugby league footballer who captained Australia internationally, and the NSW Waratahs in the Super W. She competed at the 2017 and 2021 Rugby World Cup's. She is currently in the St George Illawarra Dragons squad in the NRL Women's Premiership.

== Background ==
Hamilton was born in Orange, New South Wales and raised in Panuara. She began playing rugby union as a university exchange student in the United States.

== Rugby union career ==
In 2014, Hamilton played for the ACT Brumbies and the University of Sydney. In 2016, Hamilton made her Test debut for Australia on their tour of New Zealand.

In 2017, Hamilton represented Australia at the 2017 Women's Rugby World Cup in Ireland, where Australia finished in sixth place.

In 2018, Hamilton was a member of the NSW Waratahs inaugural Super W-winning squad, starting in their final win over the Queensland Reds. She was later a member of the Waratahs' victorious 2019 and 2020 Super W sides.

Hamilton was named in Australia's squad for the 2022 Pacific Four Series in New Zealand. She later made the Wallaroos squad for a two-test series against the Black Ferns at the Laurie O'Reilly Cup. She was selected in the team again for the delayed 2022 Rugby World Cup in New Zealand.

Hamilton made the Wallaroos side for the 2023 Pacific Four Series, and the O'Reilly Cup.

== Rugby league career ==
On 23 September 2020, due to the cancellation of a number of rugby union Tests due to the COVID-19 pandemic, Hamilton switched to rugby league, joining the Sydney Roosters NRL Women's Premiership team.

In Round 2 of the 2020 NRL Women's season, she made her debut for the Roosters in a 22–12 win over the New Zealand Warriors. On 25 October 2020, she came off the bench in the Roosters' 10–20 Grand Final loss to the Brisbane Broncos.

She joined St. George Illawarra Dragons at the start of the 2025 season on a one-year deal, and was released at the end of the season.
