= Hazel Tubic =

New Zealand rugby union player

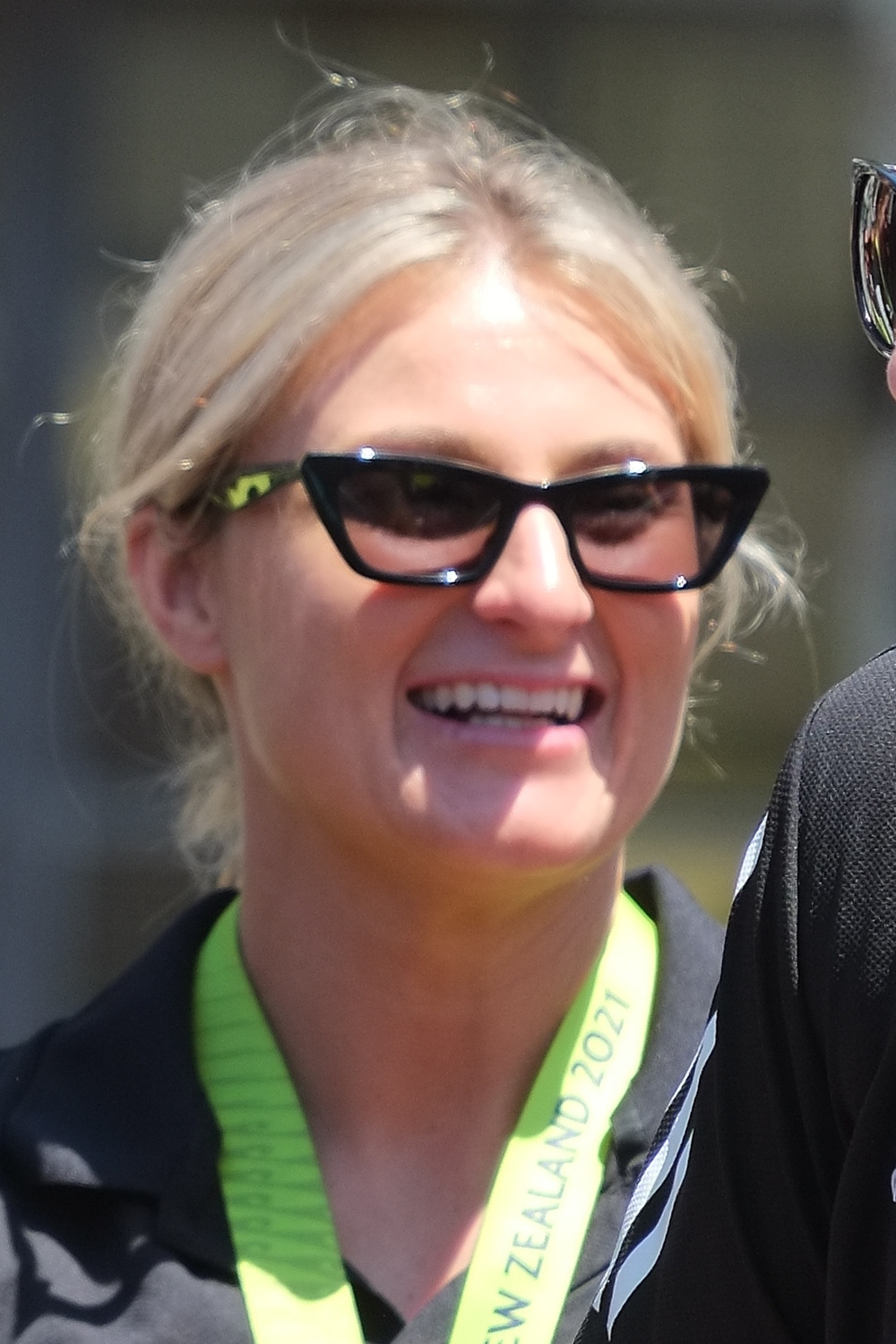
- Tubic in 2022
- Born: 31 December 1990 (age 35)
- Height: 1.65 m (5 ft 5 in)
- Weight: 70 kg (11 st 0 lb)

Rugby union career
- Position: Full Back
Provincial / State sides
Years	Team	Apps	(Points)
2009–2012	Auckland	18	(91)
2013–present	Counties Manukau Heat	59	(497)
Super Rugby
Years	Team	Apps	(Points)
2021–2025	Chiefs Manawa	15	(59)
2026–	Blues	3	(0)
International career
Years	Team	Apps	(Points)
2011–2022	New Zealand	24	(26)
National sevens team
Years	Team		Comps
–	New Zealand 7s		
Medal record
Women's rugby union
Representing New Zealand
Women's Rugby World Cup
Gold medal – first place	2017 Ireland	Team competition
Gold medal – first place	2021 New Zealand	Team competition

Hazel Tubic (born 31 December 1990) is a New Zealand–based rugby union player. She represents New Zealand internationally and was a member of their 2017 and 2021 Rugby World Cup champion sides. She plays for Blues in the Super Rugby Aupiki competition.

== Rugby career ==
=== 2011–2017 ===
Tubic made her test debut for the Black Ferns in 2011 against England. She has also represented New Zealand in rugby sevens. She was named in the squad for the 2017 Women's Rugby World Cup.

=== 2022–2023 ===
Tubic was named in the Chiefs squad for the inaugural season of Super Rugby Aupiki in 2022. She was called in as an injury replacement for the Black Ferns squad to the 2022 Pacific Four Series. In August, she was recalled into the team for the two-test series against Australia for the Laurie O'Reilly Cup.

Tubic made the Black Ferns 32-player squad for the 2021 Rugby World Cup. She rejoined Chiefs Manawa for the 2024 Super Rugby Aupiki season.
