= Katana Howard =

US international rugby union player

- Born: 25 June 1993 (age 33) Hopkins, Minnesota, United States
- Height: 5 ft 6 in (168 cm)
- Weight: 179 lb (81 kg)

Rugby union career
- Position(s): Center, fly-half
Senior career
Years	Team	Apps	(Points)
2021–	Sale Sharks		(0)
International career
Years	Team	Apps	(Points)
2019–	United States	18	(0)

Katana Howard (born 25 June 1993) is an American rugby union player. She plays at center and fly-half for the United States Eagles internationally and for Sale Sharks in the Premier 15s.

Howard made her international debut for the Eagles against England in the opening match of the 2019 Super Series. She signed with Sale Sharks in 2021.

In March 2022, Howard featured for a USA Falcons team against Wales; her side made a second-half comeback to win 31–23. She was later named in the Eagles team for the 2022 Pacific Four Series that was hosted by New Zealand.

Howard was selected in the Eagles squad for the delayed Rugby World Cup in New Zealand. She started in the Eagles loss to Italy in their first World Cup match.
