= Shannon Parry =

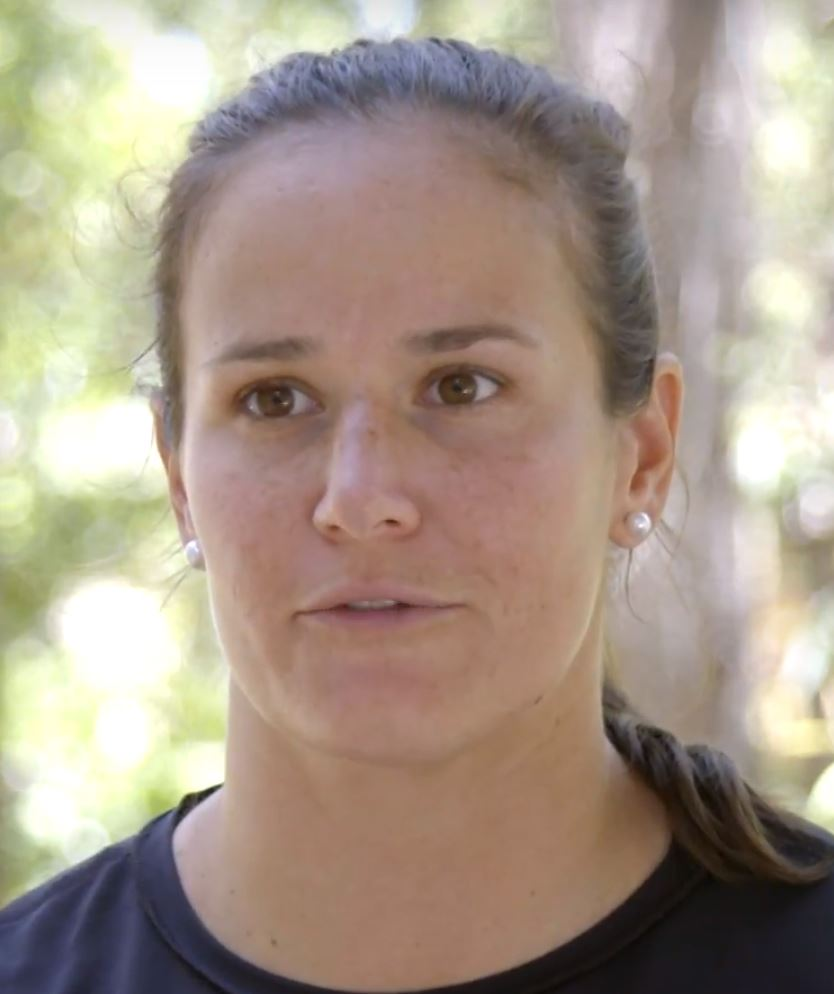
- Parry in 2018
- Born: 27 October 1989 (age 37) Brisbane, Queensland, Australia
- Height: 1.7 m (5 ft 7 in)
- Weight: 70 kg (154 lb)

Rugby union career
- Position: Flanker
International career
Years	Team	Apps	(Points)
2010–23	Australia	24	(0)
National sevens team
Years	Team		Comps
2013–Present	Australia		17
Medal record
Women's rugby sevens
Representing Australia
Olympic Games
Gold medal – first place	2016 Rio de Janeiro	Team competition
Commonwealth Games
Silver medal – second place	2018 Gold Coast	Team competition

Shannon Michelle Parry OAM (born 27 October 1989) is a former Australian rugby player. She represented Australia in 24 tests and appeared in four Rugby World Cup's, in 2010, 2014, 2017 and 2021. She won a gold medal at the 2016 Summer Olympics in Rio, and also competed at the Tokyo Olympics in 2021.

== Rugby career ==
=== 2010–13 ===
Parry was a member of the Wallaroos squad at the 2010 Rugby World Cup that finished in third place. She made her test debut in the tournament in her sides opening game against Wales. She was named in the Australian sevens squad to the 2013 Rugby World Cup Sevens in Moscow, they went into the tournament as defending champions.

=== 2014–18 ===
Parry was in Australia's 2014 Women's Rugby World Cup squad. She was co-captain of Australia's team at the 2016 Olympics, defeating New Zealand in the final to win the inaugural Olympic gold medal in the sport.

In 2017, Parry was named Captain of the Wallaroos squad. She won a silver medal as part of the sevens team at the 2018 Commonwealth Games in the Gold Coast.

=== 2020–22 ===
Parry was named in the Australia squad for the Rugby sevens at the 2020 Summer Olympics. The team came second in the pool round but then lost to Fiji 14-12 in the quarterfinals.

Parry was named in Australia's squad for the 2022 Pacific Four Series in New Zealand. She then made the Wallaroos squad for a two-test series against the Black Ferns at the Laurie O'Reilly Cup. She was selected in the team again for the delayed 2022 Rugby World Cup in New Zealand.

=== 2023 ===
Parry announced her retirement from rugby on 15 May. Her 13 year career ended on a winning note after her sides 22–5 victory over Fiji at the Allianz Stadium.
