= Meya Bizer =

- Born: May 10, 1993 (age 33)
- Height: 1.73 m (5 ft 8 in)
- Weight: 72 kg (159 lb)

Rugby union career
- Position(s): Back (7s), Full back (XV)
International career
Years	Team	Apps	(Points)
2012–Present	United States	27	(0)
National sevens team
Years	Team		Comps
2013–Present	United States		13

Meya Bizer (born May 10, 1993) is an American rugby union and sevens player.

== Biography ==
Bizer participated in football, lacrosse, track and field and soccer in high school. It was here that she was introduced to rugby. She has a bachelor's degree in psychology.

Bizer made her debut for the United States against France in 2012. She made her international sevens debut for the Eagles sevens team in the Sevens Series at the 2013 Guangzhou Sevens. She was selected for the Eagles squad for the 2014 Women's Rugby World Cup in France.

Bizer was named in the Eagles squad for the 2022 Pacific Four Series in New Zealand. She was named in the Eagles fifteens squad to the 2021 Rugby World Cup in New Zealand.

Bizer signed with the DMP Sharks for the 2022–2023 season. She was named in the Eagles traveling squad for their test against Spain, and for the 2023 Pacific Four Series. She was in the starting line-up when her side beat Spain 20–14.
