= Kristine Sommer =

American rugby union player

- Born: October 2, 1990 (age 36)
- Height: 5 ft 9 in (175 cm)
- Weight: 160 lb (73 kg)
- School: Palmdale High School
- University: University of California, Santa Barbara

Rugby union career
- Position: Back row (Flanker)
International career
Years	Team	Apps	(Points)
2012–2022	United States	25	(0)

Kristine Sommer (born October 2, 1990) is a former American rugby union and sevens player. She represented the United States at the 2017 and 2021 Rugby World Cup's.

== Background ==
Sommer graduated with a degree in chemistry from the University of California, Santa Barbara. She played for the Seattle Saracens.

== Rugby career ==
Sommer made her sevens debut for the US sevens team in 2016. A year later, she made her test debut for the United States fifteens team in 2017. She was named in the Eagles 2017 Women's Rugby World Cup squad.

Sommer played for the Harlequins and Gloucester-Hartpury in the Premier 15s.

Sommer was named in the Eagles squad for the 2022 Pacific Four Series in New Zealand. She was later selected in the Eagles squad for the 2021 Rugby World Cup in New Zealand.

In 2023, She announced her retirement from both sevens and fifteens.
