= Ayesha Leti-I'iga =

NZ international rugby union player

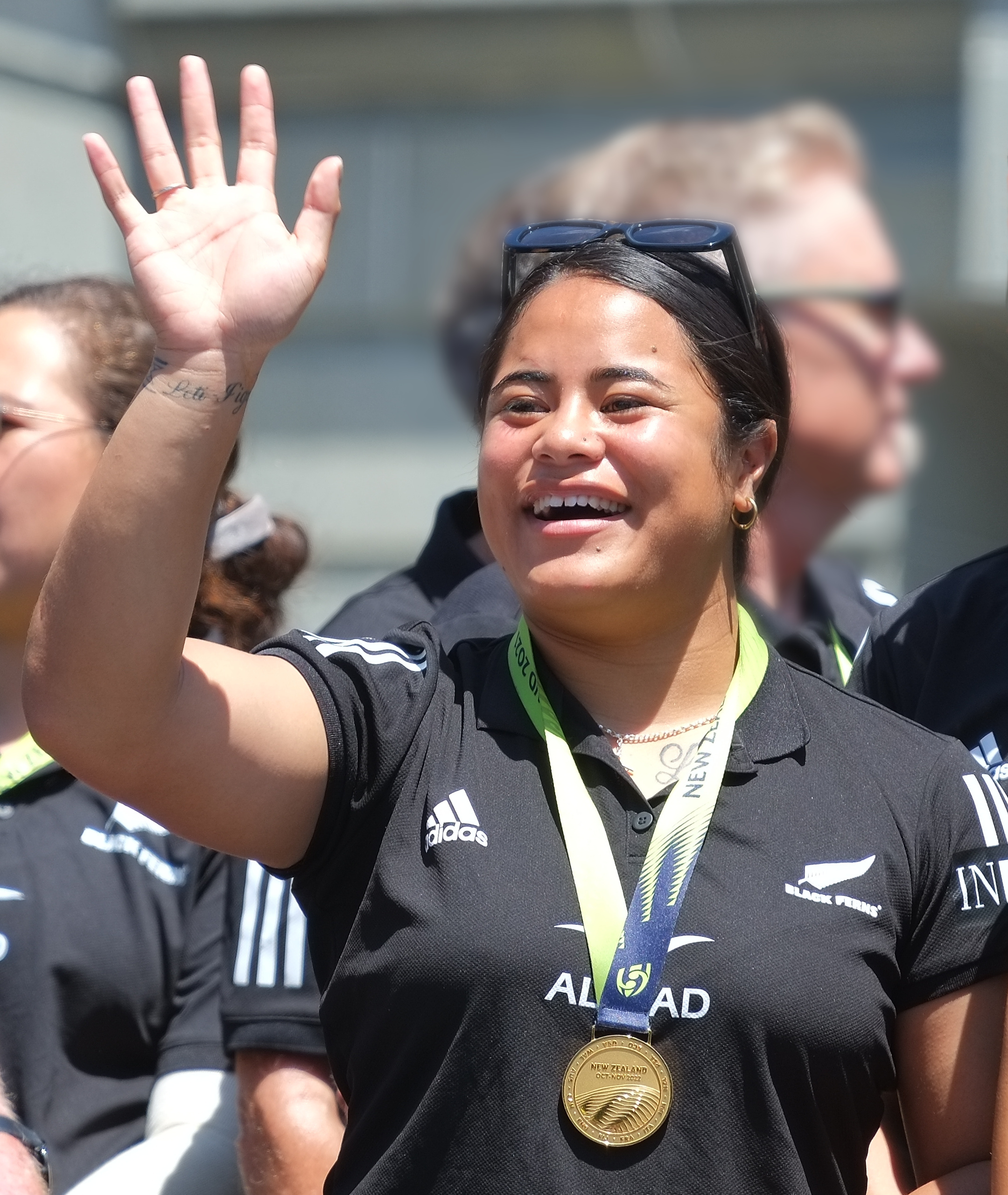
- Leti-I'iga in 2022
- Born: 3 January 1999 (age 27) Tauranga, New Zealand
- Height: 1.66 m (5 ft 5 in)
- Weight: 79 kg (174 lb)

Rugby union career
- Position: Wing
Provincial / State sides
Years	Team	Apps	(Points)
2015–2022	Wellington	43	(280)
Super Rugby
Years	Team	Apps	(Points)
2022–	Hurricanes Poua	12	(30)
International career
Years	Team	Apps	(Points)
2018–	New Zealand	30	(105)
Medal record
Women's rugby union
Representing New Zealand
Rugby World Cup
Gold medal – first place	2021 New Zealand	Tournament
Bronze medal – third place	2025 England	Team competition

Ayesha Leti-I'iga (born 3 January 1999) is a New Zealand rugby union player. She plays for Hurricanes Poua in the Super Rugby Aupiki competition, and for Wellington in the Farah Palmer Cup. She also represents New Zealand internationally and was a member of their 2021 Rugby World Cup champion squad.

== Rugby career ==
Leti-I'iga made her debut for Wellington in 2015 at the age of 16 and since then has scored 51 tries in 38 games. She also plays for Wellington club Oriental Rongotai and has scored 159 tries in 62 games for them.

=== 2018–2019 ===
Leti-I'iga made her test debut for New Zealand on 3 November 2018, she came off the bench against the United States at Chicago. She featured in all of the games at the 2019 Women's Rugby Super Series in San Diego. She also helped the Black Ferns maintain their unbeaten record against Australia later that year.

=== 2021 ===
Leti-I'iga was a standout for the Black Ferns in their unsuccessful tour of England and France in 2021, she played in three of the four test matches.

=== 2022 ===
Leti-I'iga signed with the Hurricanes Poua for the inaugural season of Super Rugby Aupiki.

Leti-I'iga was selected for the Black Ferns squad for the 2022 Pacific Four Series. She scored a brace of tries against the Wallaroos. Leti-I'iga scored a hat trick in the final match of the series against the Eagles. She was recalled into the Black Ferns squad for the August test series against Australia for the Laurie O'Reilly Cup.

In September 2022, she made the Black Ferns 32-player squad for the deferred 2021 Rugby World Cup. She scored a try in the final pool game against Scotland. In the World Cup final she scored a brace of tries against England and helped the Black Ferns win their sixth title.

=== 2023–25 ===
Leti-I'iga re-signed with Hurricanes Poua for their second season. On 27 November, it was announced that she was not considered for selection due to injury and will sit out the 2024 Super Rugby Aupiki season.

In July 2025, she was named in the Black Ferns squad to the Women's Rugby World Cup.
