= Chelsea Bremner =

New Zealand rugby union player

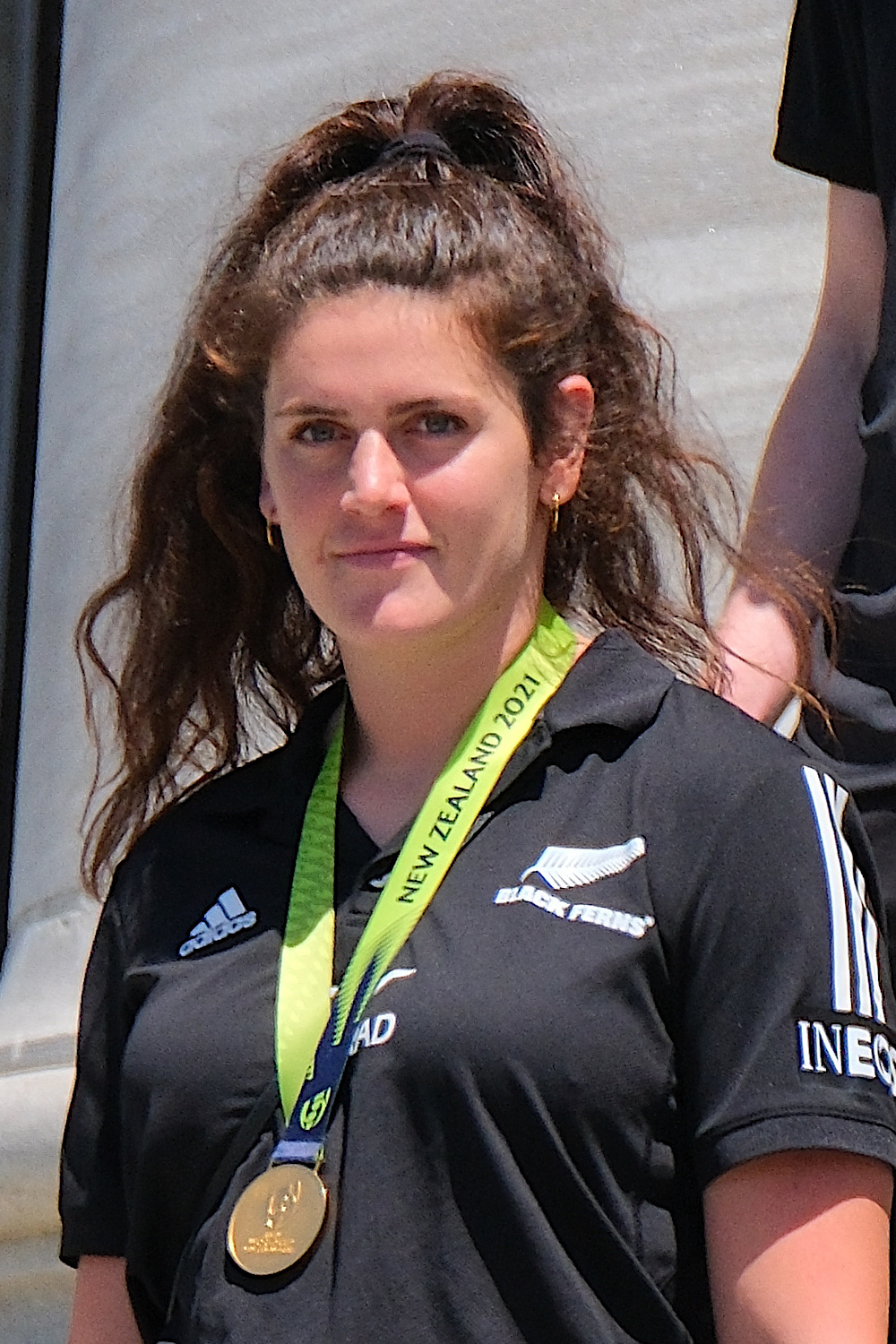
- Bremner in 2022
- Born: 11 April 1995 (age 31)
- Height: 1.81 m (5 ft 11 in)
- Weight: 88 kg (194 lb)
- Notable relative: Alana Bremner (sister)

Rugby union career
- Position: Lock
Provincial / State sides
Years	Team	Apps	(Points)
2016–2023	Canterbury	50	(20)
Super Rugby
Years	Team	Apps	(Points)
2022; 2025	Matatū	3	(0)
2023–2024	Chiefs Manawa	10	(5)
International career
Years	Team	Apps	(Points)
2020–	New Zealand	24	(15)
Medal record
Women's rugby union
Representing New Zealand
Rugby World Cup
Gold medal – first place	2021 New Zealand	Team competition
Bronze medal – third place	2025 England	Team competition

Chelsea Bremner (born 11 April 1995) is a New Zealand rugby union player. She plays for the Black Ferns internationally and was a member of their 2021 Rugby World Cup champion squad. She previously played for Matatū in 2022, but now plays for the Chiefs Manawa in the Super Rugby Aupiki competition. She represents Canterbury at a provincial level.

== Personal life ==
Bremner is a school teacher at Hornby High School. She also coaches the boys' rugby team. She began her sporting career in netball, and only took up rugby in 2015.

== Rugby career ==
=== 2019 ===
In 2019, she was named the Farah Palmer Cup Player of the Year. She was named in the New Zealand Development XV for the 2019 Oceania Rugby Women's Championship in Fiji, where she played in all three games.

=== 2020 ===
Bremner and her younger sister, Alana have both played 50 games for Lincoln University in 2020. She was part of the Canterbury team that won their fourth consecutive Farah Palmer Cup title in 2020.

Bremner made her Black Ferns debut on 14 November 2020 against the New Zealand Barbarians at Waitakere. She earned her second cap in the second match against the Barbarians at Nelson.

=== 2021–22 ===
In November 2021, Bremner signed with Matatū for the inaugural season of Super Rugby Aupiki.

Bremner was named in the Black Ferns squad for the 2022 Pacific Four Series. She made her international debut against Australia on 6 June 2022 at Tauranga. She made the team again for a two-test series against the Wallaroos for the Laurie O'Reilly Cup in August.

Bremner was selected for the Black Ferns 2021 Rugby World Cup 32-player squad. She scored the opening try against Wales in their second pool game.

=== 2023–25 ===
In 2023, She transferred from Matatū and signed with the Chiefs Manawa for the second year of the Super Rugby Aupiki competition. She scored her first try on her debut for Chiefs Manawa in their first round victory over Hurricanes Poua.

Bremner was named among the 34 contracted players for the Black Ferns as they prepared for the 2025 Rugby World Cup that was to be held in England. In July, she made the starting line up in her sides 21–52 victory over Canada at the Pacific Four Series in Ottawa.

In July 2025, she was named in the Black Ferns side to the Women's Rugby World Cup.
