= Maya Montiel =

Canadian rugby union player (born 1999)

- Born: 11 October 1999 (age 27)
- Height: 1.77 m (5 ft 10 in)
- Weight: 85 kg (187 lb)

Rugby union career
- Position: Loosehead Prop
- Current team: Saracens
Senior career
Years	Team	Apps	(Points)
2023–present	Saracens	–	(–)
International career
Years	Team	Apps	(Points)
2022–present	Canada	6	(0)
- Correct as of 27 September 2025
Medal record
Women's rugby union
Representing Canada
World Cup
Silver medal – second place	2025 England	Team competition

Maya Montiel (born 11 October 1999) is a Canadian rugby union player. She currently plays as a loosehead prop for Saracens in Premiership Women's Rugby, the top-flight competition of women's rugby union in England, and for Canada at international level.

== Rugby career ==
Maya first competed for Canada in June 2022 against the USA. She joined Saracens in 2023.

On 24 July 2025, she was named in the Canadian side to the Rugby World Cup in England.
