= Alana Bremner =

New Zealand rugby union player

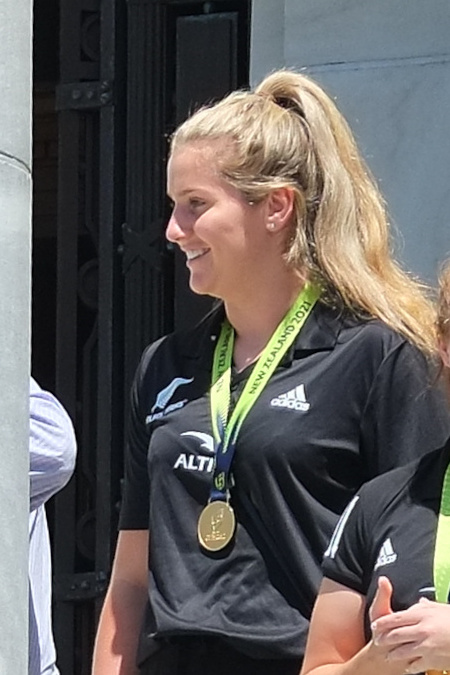
- Bremner in 2022
- Born: 10 February 1997 (age 29) Christchurch, New Zealand
- Height: 1.78 m (5 ft 10 in)
- Weight: 77 kg (170 lb)
- Notable relative: Chelsea Bremner (sister)

Rugby union career
- Position: Loose forward
Senior career
Years	Team	Apps	(Points)
2025–	Trailfinders		(5)
Provincial / State sides
Years	Team	Apps	(Points)
2014–2023	Canterbury	64	(85)
Super Rugby
Years	Team	Apps	(Points)
2022–2025	Matatū	14	(10)
International career
Years	Team	Apps	(Points)
2021–	New Zealand	35	(25)
Medal record
Women's rugby union
Representing New Zealand
Rugby World Cup
Gold medal – first place	2021 New Zealand	Team competition
Bronze medal – third place	2025 England	Team competition

Alana Bremner (born 10 February 1997) is a New Zealand rugby union player. She plays for the Trailfinders Women in the Premiership Women's Rugby competition. She previously played for Matatū in the Super Rugby Aupiki competition and for Canterbury provincially. She also represents New Zealand internationally and was a member of their 2021 Rugby World Cup champion squad.

== Rugby career ==
=== 2020 ===
Bremner had a breakthrough season in 2020, she led her side to their fourth consecutive Farah Palmer Cup title and was the leading try scorer for the season with eight tries.

Bremner was the first woman to play 50 matches for Lincoln University, and earned 50 caps for Canterbury. She played three matches for the New Zealand Development side at the 2019 Oceania Rugby Women's Championship in Fiji. In 2020, she captained the New Zealand Barbarians in the two-match series against the Black Ferns. Her older sister, Chelsea, made her Black Ferns debut in the first match.

=== 2021–22 ===
Bremner was named in the Black Ferns squad for the European tour of England and France in 2021. She made her international debut against England on 31 October 2021 at Exeter, it was the Black Ferns 100th test match. She also scored her first Test try in the match. She also played in the second test match against France.

At the end of 2021, Bremner was selected for Matatū for the inaugural 2022 Super Rugby Aupiki season.

Bremner and her sister, Chelsea, were named in the Black Ferns squad for the 2022 Pacific Four Series. She scored a try in the first match against the Wallaroos. She was recalled into the team for the August two-test series against the Wallaroos for the Laurie O'Reilly Cup.

Bremner was selected for the Black Ferns 2021 Rugby World Cup 32-player squad. She scored a try against Wales in the quarterfinals. She was a part of the Black Ferns team that were crowned champions for the sixth time.

=== 2023–25 ===
Bremner re-signed with Matatū for the 2023 season. She was part of Matatū's team that won their first Super Rugby Aupiki title after defeating Chiefs Manawa in the final. On 17 April, she was one of 34 players who received Black Ferns contracts.

In July, she was in the starting line up in her sides 21–52 victory over Canada at the Pacific Four Series in Ottawa. She was named in the Black Ferns side to the Rugby World Cup in England.

In June 2025, it was announced that she would join Premiership Women's Rugby club Trailfinders Women from the 2025–26 season.
