= Joanna Kitlinski =

US international rugby union player

- Born: July 5, 1988 (age 38)
- Height: 1.7 m (5 ft 7 in)
- Weight: 170 lb (77 kg)

Rugby union career
- Position: Hooker
Senior career
| Years | Team | Apps | (Points) |
| 2021 | Exeter Chiefs | | (0) |
| 2022 | Sale Sharks | | (0) |
International career
| Years | Team | Apps | (Points) |
| 2015–Present | United States | 19 | (0) |

Joanna Kitlinski (born July 5, 1988) is an American rugby union player. Kitlinski plays for Sale Sharks in the Premier 15s. She previously played for Exeter Chiefs in 2021.

== Biography ==
Kitlinski ran track and cross-country in high school. She began playing rugby at Grand Valley State University when her roommate invited her to practice.

Kitlinski played on the Collegiate All-American team from 2010 to 2011. She then competed in the Women's Premier League for the Glendale Merlins, she won three national titles and was MVP in 2015. She debuted for the United States in July 2015 against Canada.

Kitlinski was named in the Eagles squad for the 2022 Pacific Four Series in New Zealand. She was selected in the Eagles squad for the 2021 Rugby World Cup in New Zealand.
