= Alex Ellis (rugby union) =

Canadian rugby union player (born 1995)

- Born: 1 August 1995 (age 31) Ontario
- Height: 1.77 m (5 ft 10 in)

Rugby union career
- Position: Front line
- Current team: Stade Villeneuvois LM
Senior career
| Years | Team | Apps | (Points) |
| 2024– | Stade Villeneuvois LM | | (0) |
International career
| Years | Team | Apps | (Points) |
| 2017– | Canada | 28 | (0) |
- Correct as of 2024-12-19

Alexandria Ellis (born on August 1, 1995, in Ottawa, Ontario) is a Canadian rugby union player who plays as a prop. She has represented Canada at the international level since 2017, participated in the woman’s World Cup 2021 that was played in 2022 earning 28 caps as of December 2024. She is an international player who previously played for Saracens Women in England, where she won an Premiership cup in 2022, and has recently moved to France, where she currently plays for Stade Villeneuvois LM.

Ellis began her rugby career with Barrhaven Scottish RFC, followed by Algonquin College, the University of Ottawa Gee-Gees, and Rugby Quebec at the provincial level, where she also earned women’s championship titles with Algonquin in 2014, the university of Ottawa in 2017 and Rugby Quebec 2016 and 2017.

In 2018, she signed with Saracens Women in England, later joining Stade Français Paris in 2023 before moving to Stade Villeneuvois LM in France in 2024.

Internationally, Ellis has been a key player for Canada, participating in major tournaments such as the 2021 Rugby World Cup in New Zealand and the Pacific Four Series in 2024 when Canada historically beat the black ferns in Christchurch newzealand.

== Rugby career ==
Ellis competed for Canada at the 2021 Rugby World Cup in New Zealand. She played against USA in the quarterfinal. She then featured in the semifinal against England, and in the third place final against France.

In 2023, She was named in Canada's traveling squad for their test against South Africa and for the Pacific Four Series. In July, she featured in her sides 21–52 loss to the Black Ferns at the Pacific Series in Ottawa.

She was selected in Canada's squad for the 2025 Pacific Four Series.
