= Sara Svoboda =

Canadian rugby union player

- Born: 3 February 1995 (age 31)
- Height: 5 ft 10 in (178 cm)

Rugby union career
- Position: Back row
Senior career
Years	Team	Apps	(Points)
2020–Present	Loughborough Lightning		(0)
International career
Years	Team	Apps	(Points)
	Canada	21	(0)

Sara Svoboda (born 3 February 1995) is a Canadian rugby union player. She plays in the Back row for Canada and Loughborough Lightning.

== Rugby career ==
Svoboda graduated from Centennial Secondary School. Her rugby career began with the Belleville Bulldogs minis program, she also progressed through their junior and senior ranks. She was a member of the U20 Canada team in the 2013 Nations Cup.

She represented McMaster University in Hamilton where she was studying kinesiology.

Svoboda competed for Canada at the delayed 2021 Rugby World Cup in New Zealand. She featured in the semifinal loss to England, and started in the third place final against France.

In 2023, She was named in Canada's squad for their test against the Springbok women and for the Pacific Four Series. She scored a try in Canada's 66–7 victory over South Africa in Madrid, Spain.

== Personal life ==
Svoboda's father, Paul, captained the Canadian Cougars rugby league team that played the US in 1993. Her uncle Karl Svoboda played and captained Canada's Men's Team from 1985 to 1995, including at the first three Rugby World Cups. Her twin sister, Katie, is also capped for the senior women's team having made her debut in 2016, while her younger sister Tia is an up-and-coming player.
