= Alysha Corrigan =

Canadian rugby union and sevens player

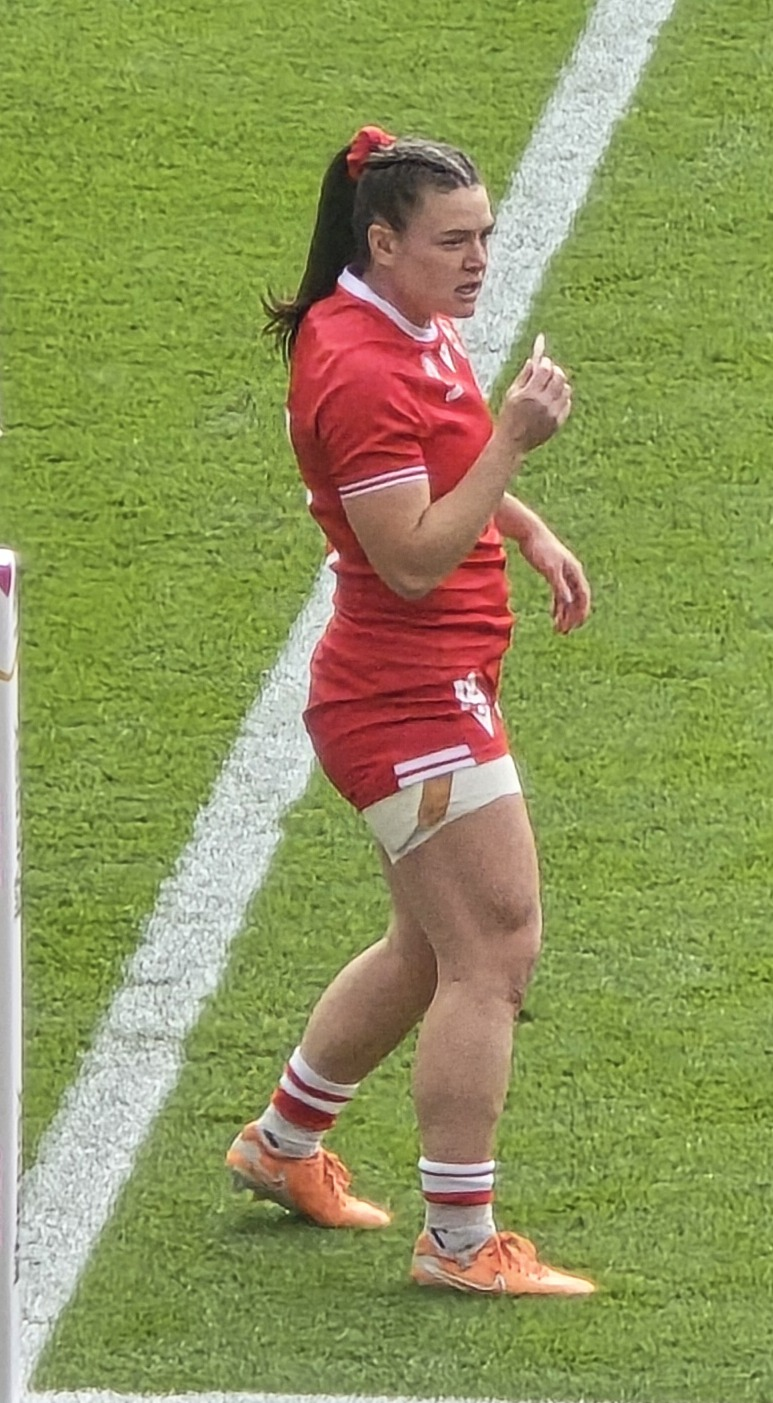
- Corrigan in 2025 Women's Rugby World Cup final
- Born: 25 January 1997 (age 29) Charlottetown, Prince Edward Island
- Height: 167 cm (5 ft 6 in)
- Weight: 70 kg (154 lb)
- University: University of Prince Edward Island

Rugby union career
- Position(s): Centre, Wing
- Current team: Saracens
Senior career
| Years | Team | Apps | (Points) |
| 2021-2022, 2024- | Saracens | 41 | (110) |
International career
| Years | Team | Apps | (Points) |
| 2018- | Canada | 26 | (50) |
National sevens team
| Years | Team | | Comps |
| 2018- | Canada 7s | | |
Medal record
Women's rugby sevens
Representing Canada
Olympics
| Silver medal – second place | 2024 Paris | Team competition |
Pan American Games
| Silver medal – second place | 2023 Santiago | Team competition |
Women's rugby union
Representing Canada
World Cup
| Silver medal – second place | 2025 England | Team competition |

Alysha Corrigan (born 25 January 1997) is a Canadian rugby union and sevens athlete. She won a silver medal at the 2024 Summer Olympics and has represented Canada at numerous international series, including the 2021 Rugby World Cup and 2025 Rugby World Cup. She currently plays for Saracens of Premiership Women's Rugby, winning the PWR Final in 2026.

== Rugby career ==
Corrigan began playing rugby in grade 11 and was introduced to the sport by her older sister Sidney. She was named to Canada's 2023 Pan American Games team in October, she won a silver medal at the tournament.

In July 2024, Corrigan was named to Canada's 2024 Olympic team for rugby sevens. The team won a silver medal, coming from 0–12 behind to defeat Australia 21–12 in the semi-finals, before losing the final to New Zealand.

She plays for English club, Saracens, in the Premiership Women's Rugby competition. She re-signed with the club at the start of the 2024–25 season having previously played for them in 2022.

Corrigan was selected in Canada's fifteens squad for the 2025 Pacific Four Series, scoring in Canada's draw against the Black Ferns in Christchurch.

In July 2025 she joined Canada's Rugby World Cup squad, helping Canada to a second place finish. In 400 minutes, Corrigan scored 4 tries and led outside backs at the tournament with 14 line breaks. After the World Cup, she joined Saracens and made an immediate impact in PWR, scoring 5 tries in four straight games. At the spring 2026 international break she rejoined Canada for the Pacific Four series where Canada finished second. Corrigan and Saracens would later go on an unbeaten streak to win the PWR Final with a group of Canadian players making significant contributions.

Corrigan rejoined Canada after the summer break for the 2026 WXV Global Series, but returned to Canada without appearing due to an injury. She would recover in time to appear in Canada's home portion of the series, scoring an important 43rd minute try as Canada's comeback victory ended England's 41-game unbeaten streak on October 16 in Toronto.
