= McKinley Hunt =

Canadian rugby union player (born 1997)

- Born: 5 January 1997 (age 29) King City, Ontario
- Height: 1.78 m (5 ft 10 in)
- Weight: 90 kg (198 lb)
- School: Country Day School

Rugby union career
- Position(s): Loosehead Prop, Lock
Senior career
Years	Team	Apps	(Points)
2020–2022	Exeter Chiefs	–	(–)
2023–2025	Saracens	–	(–)
International career
Years	Team	Apps	(Points)
2017–2025	Canada	38	(64)
- Correct as of 16 December 2025
Medal record
Women's rugby union
Representing Canada
World Cup
Silver medal – second place	2025 England	Team competition

McKinley Louise Dickson Hunt (born 5 January 1997) is a Canadian rugby union player. Finishing her career as a loosehead prop for Saracens in Premiership Women's Rugby, the top-flight competition of women's rugby union in England, and with Canada at the 2025 World Cup.

== Rugby career ==
Hunt competed for Canada at the delayed 2021 Rugby World Cup in New Zealand. She scored a try against the Eagles in their quarterfinal encounter. She then featured in the semi-final against England, and in the third place final against France.

In July 2023, she featured in her side's 21–52 loss to the Black Ferns at the Pacific Series in Ottawa.

She was selected in Canada's squad for the 2025 Pacific Four Series. On 24 July, she was named in the Canadian side to the Rugby World Cup in England.She played in all Canada's matches at RWC 2025, scoring two tries against Wales, one against Scotland, and one against Australia. Following the RWC Hunt retired from professional rugby to pursue a teaching career at St. Anne's School in Aurora, Ontario.
