= Anaïs Holly =

- Born: 10 December 1992 (age 33)
- Height: 1.70 m (5 ft 7 in)

Rugby union career
- Position: Fly-half
International career
Years	Team	Apps	(Points)
	Canada	22	(0)

Anaїs Isabelle Holly (born 10 December 1992) is a Canadian rugby union player. She plays for Town of Mont-Royal RFC.

Holly made her international debut for Canada in 2016. She competed for Canada at the 2021 Rugby World Cup in New Zealand. She played against the Eagles in their quarterfinal encounter. She also featured in the semifinal against England, and in the third place final against France.
