= Elizabeth Cairns (rugby union) =

American rugby union player (born 1992)

- Born: October 23, 1992 (age 34)
- Height: 5 ft 7 in (170 cm)
- Weight: 160 lb (73 kg)

Rugby union career
- Position: Flanker
International career
Years	Team	Apps	(Points)
2015–Present	United States	15	(0)

Elizabeth Cairns (born October 23, 1992) is an American rugby union player. She made her international debut for the United States in June 2015 against England.

Cairns was named in the Eagles squad for the 2019 Women’s Rugby Super Series.

Cairns came off the bench and scored a try in their Autumn International against Ireland in 2021. She later featured in their 89–0 trouncing by England.

Cairns was named in the Eagles squad for the 2022 Pacific Four Series in New Zealand. She started against the Wallaroos in their 16–14 win in Auckland. She was named in the starting line-up against the Black Ferns in Whangārei. She was selected in the Eagles squad for the 2021 Rugby World Cup in New Zealand.
