= Kévin Rouet =

- Born: 1 December 1986 (age 39) Colombes, France

Rugby union career
Coaching career
- Years: Team
- 2022–: Canada Women's XV's

Kévin Rouet (born 01 December 1986) is a French rugby union coach. He is currently the head coach of the Canada women's national rugby union team.

== Biography ==
Rouet was born in Colombes, he played in the amateur divisions in France before migrating to Quebec, Canada in 2009 aged 22. He studied mechanical engineering at Ecole Nationale Superieure d’Arts et Metiers (ENSAM) de Bordeaux in France and then completed a project management degree at the University of Quebec. He then worked for a bridge construction company, Canam Engineering.

=== Coaching career ===
He coached the women's teams at Laval University, Rugby Quebec and Stade Bordelais. He first joined the Canadian women's fifteens team in 2019 as an assistant coach under former head coach, Sandro Fiorino. In March 2022, He was named as the new head coach of the Canada women's national rugby union team.
