= Evelyn Ashenbrucker =

- Born: 6 August 1990 (age 36)
- Height: 5 ft 10 in (178 cm)
- Weight: 180 lb (82 kg)

Rugby union career
- Position: Lock
Senior career
Years	Team	Apps	(Points)
	San Diego Surfers		(0)
International career
Years	Team	Apps	(Points)
2022–	United States	8	(0)

Evelyn Ashenbrucker (born 6 August 1990) is an American rugby union player. She plays at Lock for the United States internationally and for the San Diego Surfers in the WPL.

== Rugby career ==
Ashenbrucker was selected in the Eagles squad for the delayed 2021 Rugby World Cup in New Zealand.

In 2023, She was named in the Eagles traveling squad for their test against Spain, and for the 2023 Pacific Four Series. She was in the starting line-up when her side beat Spain 20–14.
