= Brittany Kassil =

Canadian rugby union player

- Born: 14 March 1991 (age 35) Mississauga, Ontario, Canada
- Height: 1.8 m (5 ft 11 in)
- Weight: 85 kg (187 lb)

Rugby union career
- Position: Loosehead Prop
Senior career
Years	Team	Apps	(Points)
	Guelph Goats		(0)
International career
Years	Team	Apps	(Points)
2017–Present	Canada	53	(15)
- Correct as of 2025-09-27
Medal record
Women's rugby union
Representing Canada
World Cup
Silver medal – second place	2025 England	Team competition

Brittany Lena Elizabeth Kassil (born 14 March 1991) is a Canadian rugby union player. She plays Prop for Canada and competed at the 2017 and 2021 Rugby World Cup's.

== Personal life ==
Kassil was born in Mississauga, Ontario, and lived in Markham before moving with her family to Guelph in Grade 7. She attended Centennial Collegiate Vocational Institute and was introduced to rugby by friends. She also played for the University of Guelph Gryphons women's team. Kassil wears a size US 10 rugby boot.

== Rugby career ==
Kassil made her international debut for Canada in 2017 at the Can-Am Series. She was subsequently selected in their World Cup squad that year.

Kassil competed for Canada at the delayed 2021 Rugby World Cup in New Zealand.

In 2023, She was named in Canada's squad for their test against the Springbok women and for the Pacific Four Series. She started in Canada's 66–7 thrashing of South Africa in Madrid, Spain.

She was selected in Canada's squad for the 2025 Pacific Four Series. On 24 July 2025, she was named in the Canadian squad to the Rugby World Cup.
