= Laura Russell =

- Born: November 10, 1988 (age 38)
- Height: 1.78 m (5 ft 10 in)
- Weight: 84 kg (185 lb)
- University: University of Western Ontario
- Notable relative: Kelly Russell (sister)

Rugby union career
- Position: Prop
Amateur team(s)
Years	Team	Apps	(Points)
–	Toronto Nomads		
–	Western Mustangs		
–	Barbarian F.C.		
International career
Years	Team	Apps	(Points)
–	Canada	53	
- Correct as of 2018-11-16
Medal record
Women's rugby union
Representing Canada
World Cup
Silver medal – second place	2014 France	Team competition

Laura Russell (born November 10, 1988) is a Canadian rugby union player.

== Rugby career ==
Laura and her sister Kelly, represented Canada at the 2014 Women's Rugby World Cup. They were also in the squad that toured New Zealand in June 2014. In 2016, she was named the Rugby Canada Senior Women's Player of the Year. She took over the captaincy of the national team from her sister Kelly Russell.

Russell also represents the national women's sevens team on the Rugby Canada Black, Indigenous, and People of Colour Working Group which was established on July 17, 2020.

In 2022, Laura married long-term partner, Ray Barkwill. Barkwill also played for Rugby Canada from 2012 to 2019.

In 2022, Russell was initially named in Canada's squad to the Rugby World Cup in New Zealand. She was later ruled out of the tournament due to an injury.

== Awards and recognition ==
- 2018, Rugby Canada Gillian Florence Award
