= Olivia DeMerchant =

Canada international rugby union player

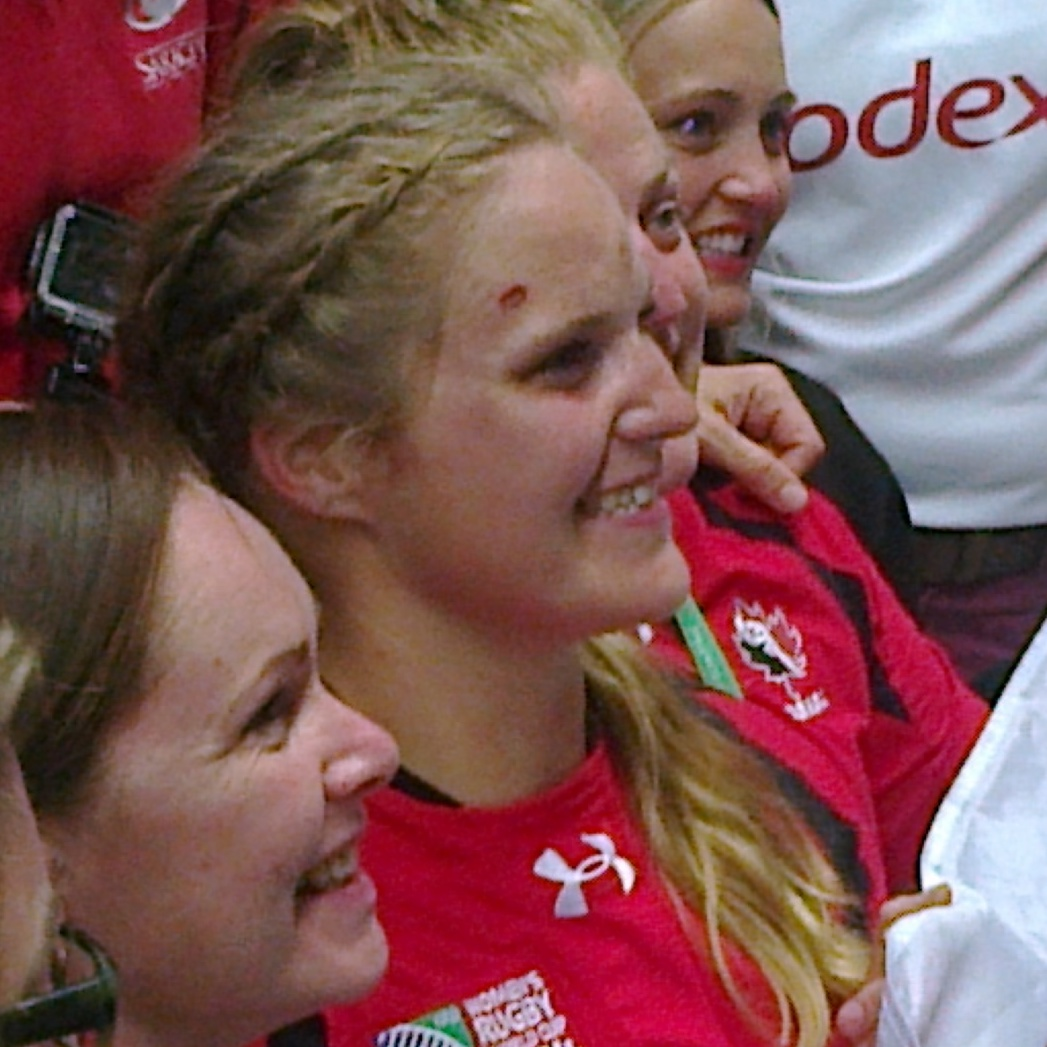
- DeMerchant in 2014
- Born: 16 February 1991 (age 35) New Brunswick
- Height: 1.75 m (5 ft 9 in)
- Weight: 90 kg (198 lb)
- University: St. Francis Xavier University

Rugby union career
- Position: Prop
Amateur team(s)
Years	Team	Apps	(Points)
2009?–2013?, 2018	St. Francis X-Women		(0)
	Woodstock Wildmen		(0)
2018?–	Fredericton Loyalists		(0)
Senior career
Years	Team	Apps	(Points)
2016–2018	Saracens	-	(0)
International career
Years	Team	Apps	(Points)
2011	Canada Under-20	-	(0)
2014–Present	Canada	65	(65)
- Correct as of 2025-09-27
Medal record
Women's rugby union
Representing Canada
World Cup
Silver medal – second place	2014 France	Team competition
Silver medal – second place	2025 England	Team competition

Olivia DeMerchant (born 16 February 1991) is a Canadian rugby union player. She has represented Canada at the 2014, 2017, 2021 and 2025 Women's Rugby World Cups.

== Rugby career ==
In 2011, DeMerchant played for the Canadian women's under-20 team. She represented Canada at the 2014 Women's Rugby World Cup.

DeMerchant played four seasons for St. Francis Xavier University where she studied. She subsequently returned, after playing with the Saracens Ladies in 2016–2018, and played her final year of eligibility in the 2018 season.

DeMerchant was selected in Canada's squad for the 2021 Rugby World Cup in New Zealand.

In 2023, she scored a try against the Black Ferns in her sides 21–52 defeat at the Pacific Four Series in Ottawa. The match earned her her 55th cap and she now sits third all-time for Canada alongside Maria Gallo.

On 24 July 2025, she was named in the Canadian squad to the Rugby World Cup.

== Canadian Football ==
DeMerchant began playing women's tackle football with the Capital Area Lady Gladiators of the Maritime Women's Football League in 2015. She dominated on both offense and defense from the running back and defensive end positions. She earned a Maritime Women's Football League Offensive All-Star award and 2015 Offense Player of the Year with the Lady Gladiators.

== Awards and recognition ==
- 2019, Rugby Canada Player of the Year (15s).
- 2019, Rugby Canada Gillian Florence Award.
