= 2012 end-of-year women's rugby union tests =

The 2012 end-of-year women's rugby union tests is a series of women's rugby union matches. For the second year in a row, New Zealand toured the Northern Hemisphere by playing three test matches against England. Black Ferns will try to revenge the double defeat suffered last year, when they were only able to get an 8–8 draw on final test day.

As a trial run for 2014 Women's Rugby World Cup, United States faced Italy for the first time ever and France during a seven-day period.

== England vs France ==
3 November 2012

England	23 - 13	France
Tries: Ruth Laybourn 32'; Joanne Watmore 44'; Fiona Davidson 75'; Con: Amber Reed 44'; Pens: Amber Reed 3', 15'		Try: Jessy Trémoulière 7'; Con: Aurélie Bailon 7'; Pens: Jessy Trémoulière 2'; Aurélie Bailon 65'

Molesey Road, Esher, Surrey
Referee: Terry Hall (England)

ENGLAND:
FB	15	Danielle Waterman
RW	14	Francesca Matthews
OC	13	Claire Allan
IC	12	Amber Reed	(substituted off) 60'
LW	11	Ruth Laybourn	(substituted off) 41'
FH	10	Alice Richardson
SH	9	Natasha Hunt	(substituted off) 60'
N8	8	Sarah Hunter (C)
OF	7	Jane Leonard
BF	6	Heather Fisher	(yellow card) 58' to 68'
RL	5	Emily Braund	(substituted off) 45'
LL	4	Rowena Burnfield	(substituted off) 45'
TP	3	Kate Newton	(substituted off) 41'
HK	2	Emma Croker	(substituted off) 41'
LP	1	Rosemarie Crowley	(substituted off) 41'
Replacements:
HK	16	Victoria Fleetwood	(substituted on) 41'
PR	17	Rochelle Clark	(substituted on) 41'
PR	18	Laura Keates	(substituted on) 41'
LK	19	Isabelle Noel-Smith	(substituted on) 45'
FL	20	Tamara Taylor	(substituted on) 45'
SH	21	Fiona Davidson	(substituted on) 60'
CE	22	Ceri Large	(substituted on) 60'
WG	23	Joanne Watmore	(substituted on) 41'
Coach:
(England) Gary Street

FRANCE:
FB	15	Jessy Trémoulière	(substituted off) 60'
RW	14	Elodie Guiglion
OC	13	Céline Héguy
IC	12	Audrey Parra
LW	11	Julie Billes	(yellow card) 27' to 37' (substituted off) 45'
FH	10	Aurélie Bailon
SH	9	Marie-Alice Yahé (C)	(substituted off) 48'
N8	8	Safi N'Diaye
OF	7	Coumba Diallo
BF	6	Manon André	(substituted off) 49'
RL	5	Assa Koïta
LL	4	Sandra Rabier	(substituted off) 45'
TP	3	Christelle Chobet	(substituted off) 50'
HK	2	Laëtitia Salles	(substituted off) 45'
LP	1	Julie Duval	(substituted off) 45'
Replacements:
HK	16	Mélanie Busques	(substituted on) 45'
PR	17	Hélène Ezanno	(substituted on) 45'
PR	18	Marjorie Vaz	(substituted on) 50'
LK	19	Marine De Nadaï	(substituted on) 45'
FL	20	Laëtitia Grand	(substituted on) 49'
SH	21	Laurène Camoin	(substituted on) 48'
WG	22	Camille Grassineau	(substituted on) 45'
FB	23	Sandra Métier	(substituted on) 60'
Coach:
(France) Christian Galonnier

Assistant referees:
n/a
n/a
Assessor:
n/a

== Italy vs United States ==
18 November 2012

Italy	20 - 34	United States
Tries: Flavia Severin 52'; Michela Sillari 58'; Cons: Veronica Schiavon 52', 58'; Pens: Veronica Schiavon 68', 76'		Tries: Kate Daley 4'; Stacey Bridges 16'; Jamie Burke 26'; Amy Daniels 50'; Valerie Griffeth 75'; Cons: Sadie Anderson 16', 26', 50'; Pen: Sadie Anderson 43'

Centro di preparazione olimpica Giulio Onesti, Roma
Referee: Claire Hodnett (England)

ITALY:
FB	15	Manuela Furlan
RW	14	Maria Diletta Veronese	(substituted off) 49'
OC	13	Maria Grazia Cioffi
IC	12	Paola Zangirolami	(substituted off) 70'
LW	11	Chiara Castellarin	(substituted off) 75'
FH	10	Veronica Schiavon
SH	9	Sara Barattin
N8	8	Flavia Severin
OF	7	Silvia Gaudino (C)
BF	6	Cecilia Zublena	(substituted off) 67'
RL	5	Alice Trevisan
LL	4	Valentina Ruzza	(substituted off) 41'
TP	3	Lucia Gai	(substituted off) 75'
HK	2	Debora Ballarini	(substituted off) 67'
LP	1	Anita Nespoli	(substituted off) 41'
Replacements:
HK	16	Awa Coulibaly	(substituted on) 67'
PR	17	Melissa Bettoni	(substituted on) 41'
PR	18	Marta Ferrari	(substituted on) 75'
LK	19	Cristina Molic	(substituted on) 67'
FL	20	Michela Este	(substituted on) 41'
SH	21	Vanessa Chindamo	(substituted on) 75'
FH	22	Michela Tondinelli	(substituted on) 70'
WG	23	Michela Sillari	(substituted on) 49'
Coach:
(Italy) Andrea Di Giandomenico

UNITED STATES:
FB	15	Kimber Rozier
RW	14	Ashley Kmiecik
OC	13	Amy Daniels	(substituted off) 61'
IC	12	Samantha Pankey
LW	11	San Juanita Moreno
FH	10	Sadie Anderson	(substituted off) 75'
SH	9	Caroline White	(substituted off) 41'
N8	8	Kate Daley
OF	7	Lynelle Kugler	(substituted off) 41'
BF	6	Shaina Turley
RL	5	Sharon Blaney	(substituted off) 61'
LL	4	Stacey Bridges
TP	3	Jamie Burke (C)	(substituted off) 54'
HK	2	Kittery Wagner	(substituted off) 67'
LP	1	Sarah Chobot	(substituted off) 48'
Replacements:
HK	16	Katy Augustyn	(substituted on) 67'
PR	17	Sarah Wilson	(substituted on) 54'
PR	18	Naima Reddick	(substituted on) 48'
LK	19	Rose Miesner	(substituted on) 61'
FL	20	Mel Denham	(substituted on) 41'
SH	21	Jennifer Lui	(substituted on) 41'
FH	22	Hannah Stolba	(substituted on) 75'
WG	23	Valerie Griffeth	(substituted on) 61'
Coach:
(United States) Pete Steinberg

Assistant referees:
Barbara Guastini (Italy)
Federica Guerzoni (Italy)
Assessor:
Beatrice Benvenuti (Italy)

== France vs United States (1st match) ==
21 November 2012

France	13 - 0	United States
Tries: penalty try 63'; Con: Sandra Métier 63'; Pens: Jessy Trémoulière 35', 45'

Stade Marcel Garcin, Orléans, Loiret
Referee: Christine Bigaran (France)

FRANCE:
FB	15	Jessy Trémoulière	(substituted off) 55'
RW	14	Céline Héguy	17' to 27'
OC	13	Lucille Godiveau
IC	12	Sandra Métier
LW	11	Cécilia Saubusse
FH	10	Audrey Parra
SH	9	Laurène Camoin	(substituted off) 68'
N8	8	Manon André
OF	7	Laëtitia Grand
BF	6	Lucie Canal
RL	5	Lenaig Corson
LL	4	Sandra Rabier
TP	3	Elodie Portaries	(substituted off) 60'
HK	2	Gaëlle Mignot (C)	(substituted off) 73'
LP	1	Aurélie Vernhet	(substituted off) 73'
Replacements:
HK	16	Hélène Ezanno	(substituted on) 73'
PR	17	Laëtitia Salles	(substituted on) 73'
LK	18	Assa Koïta	(substituted on) 60'
LK	19	Christelle Chobet
FL	20	Coumba Diallo
SH	21	Marie-Alice Yahé	(substituted on) 68'
FH	22	Aurélie Bailon
WG	23	Camille Grassineau	(substituted on) 17' (substituted off) 27' (substituted on) 55'
Coach:
(France) Christian Galonnier

UNITED STATES:
FB	15	Kimber Rozier
RW	14	Kaelene Lundstrum	(substituted off) 6'
OC	13	Ashley Kmiecik	(yellow card) 54' to 64'
IC	12	Samantha Pankey
LW	11	Meya Bizer	17' to 27'
FH	10	Hannah Stolba	(substituted off) 41'
SH	9	Jennifer Lui	(substituted off) 73'
N8	8	Mel Denham
OF	7	Lynelle Kugler
BF	6	Laura Miller
RL	5	Sharon Blaney	(substituted off) 63'
LL	4	Rose Miesner	(substituted off) 54'
TP	3	Jamie Burke (C)	(substituted off) 52'
HK	2	Katy Augustyn	(substituted off) 60'
LP	1	Naima Reddick	(substituted off) 60'
Replacements:
HK	16	Kittery Wagner	(substituted on) 60'
PR	17	Sarah Wilson	(substituted on) 52'
PR	18	Sarah Chobot	(substituted on) 60'
LK	19	Stacey Bridges	(substituted on) 63'
FL	20	Shaina Turley	(substituted on) 54'
SH	21	Caroline White	(substituted on) 73'
FH	22	Sadie Anderson	(substituted on) 17' (substituted off) 27' (substituted on) 41'
WG	23	Amy Daniels	(substituted on) 6'
Coach:
(United States) Pete Steinberg

Assistant referees:
n/a
n/a
Assessor:
n/a

== England vs New Zealand (1st match) ==
24 November 2012

England	16 - 13	New Zealand
Tries: Sarah Hunter 55'; Katherine Merchant 68'; Pens: Katy McLean 28'; Emily Scarratt 61'		Tries: Casey Robertson 32'; Kendra Cocksedge 41'; Pen: Kelly Brazier 35'

Molesey Road, Esher, Surrey
Referee: Clare Hodnett (England)

ENGLAND:
FB	15	Danielle Waterman	(substituted off) 8'
RW	14	Katherine Merchant	(substituted off) 74'
OC	13	Emily Scarratt
IC	12	Alice Richardson
LW	11	Michaela Staniford
FH	10	Katy McLean (C)
SH	9	Natasha Hunt	(substituted off) 41'
N8	8	Sarah Hunter
OF	7	Marlie Packer	(substituted off) 52'
BF	6	Heather Fisher
RL	5	Rowena Burnfield
LL	4	Tamara Taylor
TP	3	Laura Keates	(substituted off) 52'
HK	2	Victoria Fleetwood	(substituted off) 54'
LP	1	Rochelle Clark	(substituted off) 52'
Replacements:
HK	16	Emma Croker	(substituted on) 54'
PR	17	Rosemarie Crowley	(substituted on) 52'
LK	18	Sophie Hemming	(substituted on) 52'
LK	19	Emily Braund	(substituted on) 74'
FL	20	Alexandra Matthews	(substituted on) 52'
SH	21	Georgina Gulliver	(substituted on) 41' (substituted off) 52'
WG	22	Francesca Matthews	(substituted on) 52'
WG	23	Joanne Watmore	(substituted on) 8'
Coach:
(England) Gary Street

NEW ZEALAND:
FB	15	Selica Winiata
RW	14	Halie Hurring	(substituted off) 70'
OC	13	Claire Richardson
IC	12	Kelly Brazier
LW	11	Shakira Baker
FH	10	Kendra Cocksedge	(substituted off) 61'
SH	9	Emma Jensen
N8	8	Casey Robertson	(substituted off) 65'
OF	7	Justine Lavea
BF	6	Aroha Savage
RL	5	Rawinia Everitt
LL	4	Eloise Blackwell	(substituted off) 74'
TP	3	Kathleen Wilton	(substituted off) 41'
HK	2	Fiao’o Fa’amausili (C)
LP	1	Ruth McKay	(substituted off) 61'
Replacements:
HK	16	Karina Stowers	(substituted on) 61'
PR	17	Stephanie Te Ohaere-Fox	(substituted on) 41' (substituted off) 73'
PR	18	Aleisha Nelson	(substituted on) 73'
LK	19	Jackie Patea	(substituted on) 74'
FL	20	Lydia Crossman	(substituted on) 55' (yellow card) 60' to 70'
SH	21	Zoey Berry
FH	22	Victoria Subritzky-Nafatali	(substituted on) 61'
WG	23	Hazel Tubic	(substituted on) 70'
Coach:
(New Zealand) Brian Evans

Assistant referees:
Phil Bowers (England)
Ken Morgan (England)
Assessor:
Fergus Kirby (England)

== France vs United States (2nd match) ==
24 November 2012

France	27 - 3	United States
Tries: Camille Grassineau 34'; Hélène Ezanno 46'; Safi N'Diaye 76'; Cons: Aurélie Bailon 34', 46', 76'; Pens: Aurélie Bailon 26', 29'		Pen: Amelia Bizer 49'

Stade de France, Saint-Denis, Seine-Saint-Denis
Referee: Clare Daniels (England)

FRANCE:
FB	15	Audrey Parra	(substituted off) 59'
RW	14	Elodie Guiglion
OC	13	Lucille Godiveau
IC	12	Sandra Métier	(substituted off) 49'
LW	11	Camille Grassineau
FH	10	Aurélie Bailon
SH	9	Marie-Alice Yahé (C)
N8	8	Safi N'Diaye
OF	7	Laëtitia Grand	(yellow card) 48' to 58' (substituted off) 58'
BF	6	Coumba Diallo
RL	5	Assa Koïta	(substituted off) 64'
LL	4	Marine De Nadaï
TP	3	Christelle Chobet
HK	2	Laëtitia Salles	(substituted off) 52'
LP	1	Hélène Ezanno	(substituted off) 70'
Replacements:
HK	16	Gaëlle Mignot	(substituted on) 52'
PR	17	Aurélie Vernhet	(substituted on) 70'
LK	18	Elodie Portaries
LK	19	Sandra Rabier	(substituted on) 64'
FL	20	Manon André	(substituted on) 58'
CE	21	Céline Héguy	(substituted on) 49'
FB	22	Jessy Trémoulière	(substituted on) 59'
SH	23	Laurène Camoin
Coach:
(France) Christian Galonnier

UNITED STATES:
FB	15	Kimber Rozier	(substituted off) 74'
RW	14	San Juanita Moreno
OC	13	Amelia Bizer
IC	12	Amy Daniels	(substituted off) 64'
LW	11	Ashley Kmiecik
FH	10	Sadie Anderson
SH	9	Caroline White	(substituted off) 41'
N8	8	Kate Daley	(substituted off) 31' (substituted on) 37'
OF	7	Lynelle Kugler
BF	6	Shaina Turley	(substituted off) 66'
RL	5	Sharon Blaney	(substituted off) 74'
LL	4	Stacey Bridges
TP	3	Jamie Burke (C)	(yellow card) 27' to 37' (substituted off) 74'
HK	2	Kittery Wagner	(substituted off) 57'
LP	1	Sarah Chobot	(substituted off) 62'
Replacements:
HK	16	Katy Augustyn	(substituted on) 57'
PR	17	Sarah Wilson	(substituted on) 31' (substituted off) 37' (substituted on) 74'
PR	18	Naima Reddick	(substituted on) 62'
LK	19	Rose Miesner	(substituted on) 74'
N8	20	Mel Denham	(substituted on) 66'
SH	21	Jennifer Lui	(substituted on) 41'
FH	22	Hannah Stolba	(substituted on) 74'
WG	23	Valerie Griffeth	(substituted on) 64'
Coach:
(United States) Pete Steinberg

Assistant referees:
n/a
n/a
Assessor:
n/a

== England vs New Zealand (2nd match) ==
27 November 2012

England	17 - 8	New Zealand
Tries: Hannah Gallagher 18'; Joanne Watmore 74'; Cons: Emily Scarratt 18', 74'; Pen: Emily Scarratt 6'		Try: Shakira Baker 14'; Pen: Kelly Brazier 49'

Aldershot Military Stadium, Aldershot, Hampshire
Referee: Clare Daniels (England)

ENGLAND:
FB	15	Emily Scarratt
RW	14	Francesca Matthews
OC	13	Joanne Watmore
IC	12	Amber Reed	(substituted off) 60'
LW	11	Michaela Staniford
FH	10	Alice Richardson	(substituted off) 60'
SH	9	Natasha Hunt	(substituted off) 78'
N8	8	Sarah Hunter (C)	(substituted off) 56'
OF	7	Hannah Gallagher (yellow card) 65' to 75'
BF	6	Alexandra Matthews
RL	5	Emily Braund
LL	4	Tamara Taylor	(substituted off) 52'
TP	3	Sophie Hemming	(substituted off) 52'
HK	2	Emma Croker	(substituted off) 56'
LP	1	Rosemarie Crowley	(substituted off) 52'
Replacements:
HK	16	Victoria Fleetwood	(substituted on) 56'
PR	17	Rochelle Clark	(substituted on) 52'
PR	18	Laura Keates	(substituted on) 52'
LK	19	Rowena Burnfield	(substituted on) 52'
FL	20	Marlie Packer	(substituted on) 56'
SH	21	La Toya Mason	(substituted on) 78'
CE	22	Ceri Large	(substituted on) 60'
FH	23	Katy McLean	(substituted on) 60' (yellow card) 79' to 80+'
Coach:
(England) Gary Street

NEW ZEALAND:
FB	15	Selica Winiata
RW	14	Hazel Tubic	(substituted off) 72'
OC	13	Claire Richardson
IC	12	Kelly Brazier
LW	11	Shakira Baker
FH	10	Kendra Cocksedge	(substituted off) 67'
SH	9	Emma Jensen	(substituted off) 72'
N8	8	Casey Robertson
OF	7	Justine Lavea
BF	6	Aroha Savage	(substituted off) 78'
RL	5	Rawinia Everitt
LL	4	Eloise Blackwell	(substituted off) 78'
TP	3	Kathleen Wilton	(substituted off) 41'
HK	2	Fiao’o Fa’amausili (C)
LP	1	Karina Stowers	(substituted off) 41'
Replacements:
HK	16	Ruth McKay	(substituted on) 41'
PR	17	Stephanie Te Ohaere-Fox	(substituted on) 41' (substituted off) 67'
PR	18	Aleisha Nelson	(substituted on) 67'
LK	19	Jackie Patea	(substituted on) 78'
FL	20	Lydia Crossman	(substituted on) 78'
SH	21	Zoey Berry	(substituted on) 72'
CE	22	Teresa Te Tamaki	(substituted on) 67'
WG	23	Halie Hurring	(substituted on) 72'
Coach:
(New Zealand) Brian Evans

Assistant referees:
Sara Cox (England)
Tim Bailey (England)
Assessor:
Keith Page (England)

== England vs New Zealand (3rd match) ==
1 December 2012

England	32 - 23	New Zealand
Tries: Katherine Merchant 8', 23'; Emily Scarratt 12'; Rosemarie Crowley 33'; Joanne Watmore 47'; Cons: Emily Scarratt 12', 33'; Pen: Emily Scarratt 55'		Tries: Rawinia Everitt 17'; Selica Winiata 40'; Kendra Cocksedge 69'; Con: Kelly Brazier 17'; Pens: Kelly Brazier 31', 42'

Twickenham Stadium, London
Referee: Sherry Trumbull (Canada)

ENGLAND:
FB	15	Emily Scarratt
RW	14	Katherine Merchant
OC	13	Joanne Watmore
IC	12	Alice Richardson	(substituted off) 77'
LW	11	Michaela Staniford	(substituted off) 55'
FH	10	Katy McLean (C)
SH	9	Natasha Hunt	(substituted off) 71'
N8	8	Sarah Hunter	(substituted off) 67'
OF	7	Marlie Packer	(substituted off) 55'
BF	6	Heather Fisher	(yellow card) 40' to 50'
RL	5	Rowena Burnfield
LL	4	Tamara Taylor
TP	3	Laura Keates	(substituted off) 49'
HK	2	Victoria Fleetwood	(substituted off) 41'
LP	1	Rosemarie Crowley	(substituted off) 49'
Replacements:
HK	16	Emma Croker	(substituted on) 41'
PR	17	Sophie Hemming	(substituted on) 49'
PR	18	Rochelle Clark	(substituted on) 49'
LK	19	Emily Braund	(substituted on) 67'
FL	20	Hannah Gallagher	(substituted on) 55'
SH	21	La Toya Mason	(substituted on) 71'
CE	22	Amber Reed	(substituted on) 77'
WG	23	Francesca Matthews	(substituted on) 55'
Coach:
(England) Gary Street

NEW ZEALAND:
FB	15	Kelly Brazier
RW	14	Selica Winiata
OC	13	Shakira Baker
IC	12	Claire Richardson
LW	11	Hazel Tubic	(substituted off) 41'
FH	10	Kendra Cocksedge
SH	9	Emma Jensen	(substituted off) 60'
N8	8	Casey Robertson	(substituted off) 49'
OF	7	Justine Lavea
BF	6	Aroha Savage	(yellow card) 46' to 56'
RL	5	Rawinia Everitt
LL	4	Eloise Blackwell	(substituted off) 60'
TP	3	Stephanie Te Ohaere-Fox	(substituted off) 53'
HK	2	Fiao’o Fa’amausili (C)
LP	1	Ruth McKay	(substituted off) 72'
Replacements:
HK	16	Karina Stowers	(substituted on) 72'
PR	17	Kathleen Wilton	(substituted on) 53' (substituted off) 77'
PR	18	Aleisha Nelson	(substituted on) 77'
LK	19	Jackie Patea	(substituted on) 60'
FL	20	Lydia Crossman	(substituted on) 49'
SH	21	Teresa Te Tamaki	(substituted on) 60'
CE	22	Anika Tiplady
WG	23	Halie Hurring	(substituted on) 41'
Coach:
(New Zealand) Brian Evans

Assistant referees:
Philip Davies (England)
Dino Maddern (England)
Assessor:
Steve Leyshon (England)

== Italy vs Spain ==
9 December 2012

Italy	29 - 12	Spain
Tries: Maria Diletta Veronese 1', 54'; Alice Trevisan 7'; Sofia Stefan 67'; Cons: Veronica Schiavon 1', 7', 67'; Pen: Veronica Schiavon 30'		Tries: Diana Gassó 77'; Rocío García 80'; Con: Marina Bravo 77'

Centro di preparazione olimpica Giulio Onesti, Roma
Referee: Clare Daniels (England)

ITALY:
FB	15	Manuela Furlan
RW	14	Sofia Stefan	(substituted off) 76'
OC	13	Michella Sillari
IC	12	Paola Zangirolami
LW	11	Maria Diletta Veronese	(substituted off) 64'
FH	10	Veronica Schiavon
SH	9	Sara Barattin
N8	8	Flavia Severin	(substituted off) 73'
OF	7	Silvia Gaudino (C)
BF	6	Michela Este
RL	5	Alice Trevisan	(substituted off) 73'
LL	4	Cristina Molic
TP	3	Lucia Gai	(substituted off) 73'
HK	2	Sara Zanon	(substituted off) 65'
LP	1	Melissa Bettoni	(substituted off) 73'
Replacements:
HK	16	Debora Ballarini	(substituted on) 73'
PR	17	Marta Ferrari	(substituted on) 65'
PR	18	Awa Coulibaly	(substituted on) 73'
LK	19	Alessia Pantarotto	(substituted on) 73'
FL	20	Giuliana Campanella	(substituted on) 73'
SH	21	Vanessa Chindamo	(substituted on) 64'
FH	22	Michela Tondinelli	(substituted on) 76'
CE	23	Maria Grazia Cioffi
Coach:
(Italy) Andrea Di Giandomenico

SPAIN:
FB	15	Julia Plá	(substituted off) 70'
RW	14	Elisabeth Martínez
OC	13	Marina Bravo (C)
IC	12	Patricia García
LW	11	Ana Vanesa Rial	(substituted off) 41'
FH	10	Irene Schiavon	(substituted off) 62'
SH	9	Marta Cabané
N8	8	Ana María Aigneren
OF	7	Diana Gassó	(substituted off) 70'
BF	6	Sara De La Llama	(yellow card) 5' to 15'
RL	5	Rocío García
LL	4	Lía Bailán
TP	3	Nerea Otxoa	(substituted off) 60'
HK	2	Aroa González
LP	1	María del Carmen Sequedo	(substituted off) 55'
Replacements:
PR	16	Isabel Rico	(substituted on) 60'
CE	17	Elena Roca	(substituted on) 62'
FL	18	Paula Medín
FB	19	Isis Velasco
SH	20	Anna Arnau	(substituted on) 41'
WG	21	Berta García	(substituted on) 70'
CE	22	Laura Esbrí	(substituted on) 70'
PR	23	María Casado	(substituted on) 55'
Coach:
(Spain) Inés Etxegibel

Assistant referees:
Monia Salvini (Italy)
Federica Guerzoni (Italy)
Assessor:
n/a
