= 2013 mid-year women's rugby union tests =

The 2013 mid-year women's rugby union tests were a series of women's rugby union matches played through June and July around the world.

United States looked to avenge two losses suffered to France during last year's European tour in Orléans and Paris.

As a part of a three-year test series agreement between New Zealand Rugby Union and Rugby Football Union, New Zealand will play against England its first match at home since 2007, when the team challenged Australia. The first test will be the curtain-raiser to the Blues – Chiefs Investec Super Rugby match and will be broadcast live on Sky in New Zealand.

For England and United States, the matches were warm-ups ahead of the 2013 Nations Cup in Denver, Colorado.

== United States vs France (1st match) ==
7 June 2013

United States	13 - 10	France
Try: Sarah Chobot 55'; Con: Sadie Anderson 55'; Pens: Sadie Anderson 30', 44'		Tries: Jessy Trémoulière 9'; Joanna Sainlo 25'

Oxnard College Soccer Stadium, Oxnard, California
Referee: Nicky Inwood (New Zealand)

UNITED STATES:
FB	15	Sadie Anderson
RW	14	Erica Cavanaugh	(substituted off) 76'
OC	13	Meya Bizer	(substituted off) 41'
IC	12	Megan Bonny
LW	11	Ryan Carlyle
FH	10	Hannah Stolba
SH	9	Jossy Tseng
N8	8	Shaina Turley (C)
OF	7	Lynelle Kugler
BF	6	Stacey Bridges
RL	5	Molly Kinsella	(substituted off) 60'
LL	4	Sarah Walsh	(substituted off) 71'
TP	3	Jamie Burke	(substituted off) 74'
HK	2	Kittery Wagner	(substituted off) 69'
LP	1	Sarah Chobot	(substituted off) 67'
Replacements:
HK	16	Katy Augustyn	(substituted in) 69'
PR	17	Jessica Davis	(substituted in) 74'
PR	18	Naima Reddick	(substituted in) 67'
LK	19	Kristin Zdancewicz	(substituted in) 71'
FL	20	Kate Daley	(substituted in) 60'
SH	21	Carrie White
FH	22	Anne Peterson	(substituted in) 41'
WG	23	Amanda Street	(substituted in) 76'
Coach:
(United States) Pete Steinberg

FRANCE:
FB	15	Jessy Trémoulière
RW	14	Clémence Rousseau	(substituted off) 57'
OC	13	Sandra Métier
IC	12	Lucille Godiveau
LW	11	Céline Heguy
FH	10	Sandrine Agricole
SH	9	Marie-Alice Yahé (C)	(substituted off) 64'
N8	8	Sophie Pin
OF	7	Manon André
BF	6	Coumba Diallo	(substituted off) 67'
RL	5	Lénaïg Corson	(substituted off) 67'
LL	4	Sandra Rabier
TP	3	Christelle Chobet	(substituted off) 57'
HK	2	Joanna Sainlo	(yellow card) 52' to 62' (substituted off) 62'
LP	1	Lisa Arricastre	(substituted off) 41'
Replacements:
HK	16	Gaëlle Mignot	(substituted in) 62'
PR	17	Hélène Ezanno	(substituted in) 41'
PR	18	Elodie Portaries	(substituted in) 57'
LK	19	Assa Koïta	(substituted in) 67'
FL	20	Laëtitia Grand	(substituted in) 67'
SH	21	Yanna Rivoalen	(substituted in) 64'
FH	22	Läurelin Fourcade	(substituted in) 57'
CE	23	Aurélie Bailon
Coach:
(France) Christian Galonnier

Assistant referees:
n/a
n/a
Assessor:
n/a

== United States vs France (2nd match) ==
11 June 2013

United States	25 - 27	France
Tries: Sharon Blaney 42', 79'; Kate Daley 58'; Cons: Sadie Anderson 58', 79'; Pens: Sadie Anderson 20', 51'		Tries: Laëtitia Estève 9'; Assa Koïta 30'; Con: Aurélie Bailon 30'; Pens: Aurélie Bailon 7', 25', 65', 70', 76'

Oxnard College Soccer Stadium, Oxnard, California
Referee: Olivia Nigh (United States)

UNITED STATES:
FB	15	Meya Bizer
RW	14	Amanda Street
OC	13	Erin Overcash	(substituted off) 40'
IC	12	Anne Peterson
LW	11	Ashley Kmiecik (C)
FH	10	Sadie Anderson
SH	9	Carrie White	(substituted off) 58'
N8	8	Kate Daley
OF	7	Kristin Zdancewicz	(yellow card) 60' to 70'
BF	6	Mel Denham	(substituted off) 58'
RL	5	Sharon Blaney
LL	4	Sarah Walsh	(substituted off) 78'
TP	3	Jessica Davis	(substituted off) 50'
HK	2	Kittery Wagner	(substituted off) 64'
LP	1	Naima Reddick	(substituted off) 70'
Replacements:
HK	16	Devin Keller	(substituted in) 64'
PR	17	Hope Rogers	(substituted in) 50'
PR	18	Jamie Burke	(substituted in) 70'
LK	19	Carmen Farmer	(substituted in) 78'
FL	20	Shaina Turley	(substituted in) 58'
SH	21	Jennifer Lui	(substituted in) 58'
FB	22	Hannah Stolba
CE	23	Megan Bonny	(substituted in) 40'
Coach:
(United States) Pete Steinberg

FRANCE:
FB	15	Audrey Parra
RW	14	Läurelin Fourcade
OC	13	Sandra Métier
IC	12	Lucille Godiveau	(substituted off) 40'
LW	11	Laëtitia Estève
FH	10	Aurélie Bailon
SH	9	Yanna Rivoalen	(substituted off) 70'
N8	8	Safi N'Diaye
OF	7	Manon André	(substituted off) 68'
BF	6	Laëtitia Grand
RL	5	Assa Koïta
LL	4	Sandra Rabier	(substituted off) 64'
TP	3	Elodie Portaries	(substituted off) 51'
HK	2	Gaëlle Mignot (C)	(substituted off) 76'
LP	1	Hélène Ezanno	(substituted off) 50'
Replacements:
HK	16	Joanna Sainlo	(substituted in) 76'
PR	17	Lisa Arricastre	(substituted in) 50'
PR	18	Christelle Chobet	(substituted in) 51'
LK	19	Lénaïg Corson	(substituted in) 64'
FL	20	Coumba Diallo	(substituted in) 68'
SH	21	Marie-Alice Yahé	(substituted in) 70'
WG	22	Clémence Rousseau
FH	23	Sandrine Agricole	(substituted in) 40'
Coach:
(France) Christian Galonnier

Assistant referees:
n/a
n/a
Assessor:
n/a

== United States vs France (3rd match) ==
14 June 2013

United States	12 - 18	France
Tries: Ashley Kmiecik 31'; Erica Cavanaugh 75'; Con: Sadie Anderson 31'		Tries: Safi N'Diaye 19'; Gaëlle Mignot 63'; Con: Aurélie Bailon 19'; Pens: Aurélie Bailon 52', 55'

StubHub Center, Carson, California
Referee: Nicky Inwood (New Zealand)

UNITED STATES:
FB	15	Meya Bizer
RW	14	Erica Cavanaugh
OC	13	Megan Bonny	(substituted off) 60'
IC	12	Anne Peterson
LW	11	Ashley Kmiecik
FH	10	Sadie Anderson
SH	9	Jossy Tseng
N8	8	Shaina Turley (C)
OF	7	Lynelle Kugler
BF	6	Stacey Bridges
RL	5	Sarah Walsh	(substituted off) 60'
LL	4	Sharon Blaney	(substituted off) 50'
TP	3	Jamie Burke
HK	2	Katy Augustyn	(substituted off) 50'
LP	1	Sarah Chobot	(substituted off) 70'
Replacements:
HK	16	Kittery Wagner	(substituted in) 50'
PR	17	Hope Rogers	(substituted in) 70'
PR	18	Naima Reddick
LK	19	Kristin Zdancewicz	(substituted in) 60'
FL	20	Kate Daley	(substituted in) 50'
SH	21	Carrie White
FH	22	Hannah Stolba	(substituted in) 60'
CE	23	Amanda Street
Coach:
(United States) Pete Steinberg

FRANCE:
FB	15	Jessy Trémoulière
RW	14	Läurelin Fourcade
OC	13	Sandrine Agricole	(substituted off) 75'
IC	12	Lucille Godiveau
LW	11	Céline Heguy	(substituted off) 54'
FH	10	Aurélie Bailon
SH	9	Marie-Alice Yahé (C)	(substituted off) 77'
N8	8	Safi N'Diaye
OF	7	Laëtitia Grand	(substituted off) 40'
BF	6	Coumba Diallo
RL	5	Assa Koïta	(substituted off) 58'
LL	4	Sandra Rabier
TP	3	Christelle Chobet	(substituted off) 75'
HK	2	Gaëlle Mignot	(substituted off) 75'
LP	1	Hélène Ezanno	(substituted off) 75'
Replacements:
HK	16	Joanna Sainlo	(substituted in) 75'
PR	17	Lisa Arricastre	(substituted in) 75'
PR	18	Elodie Portaries	(substituted in) 75'
LK	19	Lénaïg Corson	(substituted in) 58'
FL	20	Sophie Pin	(substituted in) 40'
SH	21	Yanna Rivoalen	(substituted in) 77'
WG	22	Clémence Rousseau	(substituted in) 54'
CE	23	Audrey Parra	(substituted in) 75'
Coach:
(France) Christian Galonnier

Assistant referees:
n/a
n/a
Assessor:
n/a

== New Zealand vs England (1st match) ==
13 July 2013

New Zealand	29 - 10	England
Tries: Portia Woodman 23'; Amiria Rule 74'; Justine Lavea 77'; Con: Kelly Brazier 77'; Pens: Kelly Brazier 15', 43', 65', 71'		Try: Marlie Packer 33'; Con: Emily Scarratt 33'; Pen: Emily Scarratt 46'

Eden Park, Auckland, New Zealand
Referee: Nicky Inwood (New Zealand)

NEW ZEALAND:
FB	15	Victoria Grant
RW	14	Portia Woodman
OC	13	Claire Richardson	(substituted off) 76'
IC	12	Amiria Rule
LW	11	Renee Wickcliffe	(substituted off) 79'
FH	10	Kelly Brazier
SH	9	Kendra Cocksedge	(substituted off) 51'
N8	8	Casey Robertson
OF	7	Justine Lavea	(substituted off) 79'
BF	6	Aroha Savage	(substituted off) 68'
RL	5	Vita Dryden
LL	4	Rawinia Everitt
TP	3	Melodie Bosman	(substituted off) 51'
HK	2	Fiao’o Fa’amausili (C)	(substituted off) 67'
LP	1	Ruth McKay	(substituted off) 61'
Replacements:
HK	16	Karina Stowers	(substituted in) 67'
PR	17	Kathleen Wilton	(substituted in) 61'
PR	18	Stephanie Te Ohaere-Fox	(substituted in) 51'
LK	19	Jackie Patea	(substituted in) 68'
FL	20	Charmaine McMenamin	(substituted in) 79'
SH	21	Emma Jensen	(substituted in) 51'
FH	22	Chelsea Alley	(substituted in) 76'
WG	23	Selica Winiata	(substituted in) 79'
Coach:
(New Zealand) Brian Evans

ENGLAND:
FB	15	Emily Scarratt
RW	14	Katherine Merchant
OC	13	Rachael Burford
IC	12	Amber Reed	(substituted off) 70'
LW	11	Kay Wilson	(substituted off) 62'
FH	10	Katy McLean
SH	9	La Toya Mason	(substituted off) 60'
N8	8	Sarah Hunter (C)
OF	7	Marlie Packer	(substituted off) 61'
BF	6	Alexandra Matthews	(substituted off) 40'
RL	5	Tamara Taylor
LL	4	Joanna McGilchrist
TP	3	Sophie Hemming	(substituted off) 70'
HK	2	Emma Croker	(substituted off) 53'
LP	1	Rochelle Clark	(substituted off) 60'
Replacements:
HK	16	Victoria Fleetwood	(substituted in) 53'
PR	17	Laura Keates	(substituted in) 60'
PR	18	Kate Newton	(substituted in) 70'
LK	19	Emily Braund	(substituted in) 61'
FL	20	Isabelle Noel-Smith	(substituted in) 40'
SH	21	Natasha Hunt	(substituted in) 60'
FH	22	Ceri Large	(substituted in) 70'
WG	23	Michaela Staniford	(substituted in) 62'
Coach:
(England) Gary Street

Assistant referees:
Clare Daniels (England)
Jessica Beard (New Zealand)
Assessor:
n/a

== New Zealand vs England (2nd match) ==
16 July 2013

New Zealand	14 - 9	England
Tries: Portia Woodman 63'; Selica Winiata 80'+2'; Cons: Kelly Brazier 63', 80'+2'		Pens: Katy McLean 10', 30', 77'

Waikato Stadium, Hamilton, New Zealand
Referee: Clare Daniels (England)

NEW ZEALAND:
FB	15	Selica Winiata
RW	14	Portia Woodman
OC	13	Claire Richardson
IC	12	Amiria Rule
LW	11	Renee Wickliffe
FH	10	Kelly Brazier
SH	9	Emma Jensen	(substituted off) 68'
N8	8	Casey Robertson
OF	7	Justine Lavea
BF	6	Rawinia Everitt
RL	5	Vita Dryden
LL	4	Jackie Patea	(substituted off) 50'
TP	3	Melodie Bosman	(substituted off) 40'
HK	2	Fiao’o Fa’amausili (C)	(substituted off) 63'
LP	1	Ruth McKay	(substituted off) 50'
Replacements:
HK	16	Karina Stowers	(substituted in) 63'
PR	17	Kathleen Wilton	(substituted in) 50'
PR	18	Stephanie Te Ohaere-Fox	(substituted in) 40'
LK	19	Eloise Blackwell	(substituted in) 50'
FL	20	Charmaine McMenamin
FL	21	Kendra Cocksedge	(substituted in) 68'
CE	22	Chelsea Alley
CE	23	Mele Hufanga
Coach:
(New Zealand) Brian Evans

ENGLAND:
FB	15	Kay Wilson
RW	14	Francesca Matthews
OC	13	Emily Scarratt
IC	12	Rachael Burford
LW	11	Michaela Staniford	(substituted off) 65'
FH	10	Katy McLean
SH	9	Natasha Hunt	(substituted off) 54'
N8	8	Harriet Millar-Mills
OF	7	Marlie Packer
BF	6	Sarah Hunter (C)	(substituted off) 54'
RL	5	Emily Braund
LL	4	Joanna McGilchrist	(yellow card) 13' to 23'
TP	3	Sophie Hemming	(substituted off) 65'
HK	2	Victoria Fleetwood	(substituted off) 65'
LP	1	Laura Keates
Replacements:
HK	16	Emma Croker	(substituted in) 65'
PR	17	Kate Newton
PR	18	Rochelle Clark	(substituted in) 65'
LK	19	Tamara Taylor
FL	20	Alexandra Matthews	(substituted in) 54'
SH	21	La Toya Mason	(substituted in) 54'
FH	22	Ceri Large
WG	23	Sally Tuson	(substituted in) 65'
Coach:
(England) Gary Street

Assistant referees:
Nicky Inwood (New Zealand)
Lee Jeffrey (New Zealand)
Assessor:
n/a

== New Zealand vs England (3rd match) ==
20 July 2013

New Zealand	29 - 8	England
Tries: Claire Richardson 7'; Aroha Savage 25'; Selica Winiata 53'; Kendra Cocksedge 78'; Cons: Kelly Brazier 7', 25'; Kendra Cocksedge 78'; Pen: Kelly Brazier 16'		Try: Rochelle Clark 45'; Pen: Katy McLean 6'

ECOlight Stadium, Pukekohe, New Zealand
Referee: Nicky Inwood (New Zealand)

NEW ZEALAND:
FB	15	Selica Winiata
RW	14	Portia Woodman	(substituted in) 76'
OC	13	Claire Richardson	(substituted in) ??'
IC	12	Amiria Rule
LW	11	Renee Wickliffe
FH	10	Kelly Brazier
SH	9	Emma Jensen	(substituted in) ??'
N8	8	Casey Robertson
OF	7	Charmaine McMenamin
BF	6	Aroha Savage	(substituted in) ??'
RL	5	Vita Dryden	(substituted in) ??'
LL	4	Rawinia Everitt
TP	3	Stephanie Te Ohaere-Fox	(substituted in) ??'
HK	2	Fiao’o Fa’amausili (C)
LP	1	Kathleen Wilton	(substituted in) ??'
Replacements:
HK	16	Karina Stowers
PR	17	Ruth McKay	(substituted in) ??'
PR	18	Melodie Bosman	(substituted in) ??'
LK	19	Eloise Blackwell	(substituted in) ??'
FL	20	Justine Lavea	(substituted in) ??'
FL	21	Kendra Cocksedge	(substituted in) ??'
CE	22	Chelsea Alley	(substituted in) ??'
CE	23	Onjeurlina Leiataua	(substituted in) 76'
Coach:
(New Zealand) Brian Evans

ENGLAND:
FB	15	Kay Wilson
RW	14	Katherine Merchant	(substituted off) 77'
OC	13	Amber Reed
IC	12	Rachael Burford	(substituted off) 77'
LW	11	Michaela Staniford	(substituted off) 52'
FH	10	Katy McLean
SH	9	La Toya Mason
N8	8	Sarah Hunter (C)
OF	7	Marlie Packer
BF	6	Alexandra Matthews	(substituted off) 64'
RL	5	Tamara Taylor
LL	4	Joanna McGilchrist	(substituted off) 64'
TP	3	Sophie Hemming	(substituted off) 46'
HK	2	Victoria Fleetwood	(substituted off) 52'
LP	1	Rochelle Clark	(substituted off) 72'
Replacements:
HK	16	Emma Croker	(substituted in) 52'
PR	17	Laura Keates	(substituted in) 46'
PR	18	Kate Newton	(substituted in) 72'
LK	19	Emily Braund	(substituted in) 64'
FL	20	Harriet Millar-Mills	(substituted in) 64' (yellow card) 76' to 80'
FH	21	Ceri Large	(substituted in) 77'
WG	22	Francesca Matthews	(substituted in) 77'
WG	23	Sally Tuson	(substituted in) 52'
Coach:
(England) Gary Street

Assistant referees:
Clare Daniels (England)
Chelsea Gurr (New Zealand)
Assessor:
n/a

== See also ==
- Women's international rugby union
- 2012 end-of-year women's rugby union tests
