= List of France women's national rugby union team matches =

The following is a list of France women's national rugby union team international matches.

== Overall ==
France's overall international match record against all nations, updated to 27 September 2025, is as follows:

| | Games Played | Won | Drawn | Lost | Percentage of wins |
| Total | 291 | 197 | 5 | 89 | 67.7% |

== 1982–1989 ==
| Test | Date | France | Score | Opponent | Venue | Event |
|---|---|---|---|---|---|---|
| 1 | 13 June 1982 | France | 4–0 | Netherlands | Utrecht | First women's test |
| 2 | 5 June 1983 | France | 10–0 | Netherlands | La Teste-de-Buch | |
| 3 | 27 May 1984 | France | 3–0 | Netherlands | Hilversum | |
| 4 | 2 June 1985 | France | 20–0 | Netherlands | Bourg-en-Bresse | |
| 5 | 22 June 1985 | France | 0–0 | Italy | Riccione | |
| 6 | 19 April 1986 | France | 14–8 | Great Britain | Richmond Athletic Park | |
| 7 | 1 May 1986 | France | 0–10 | Netherlands | Enschede | |
| 8 | 18 May 1986 | France | 12–0 | Italy | Bardos | |
| 9 | 2 May 1987 | France | 28–6 | Great Britain | Chalon-sur-Saône | |
| 10 | 17 May 1987 | France | 16–4 | Italy | Rome | |
| 11 | 31 May 1987 | France | 22–3 | Netherlands | Chalon-sur-Saône | |
| 12 | 21 May 1988 | France | 13–3 | Netherlands | Bourg-en-Bresse | 1988 European Cup |
| 13 | 22 May 1988 | France | 16–3 | Italy | Bourg-en-Bresse | 1988 European Cup |
| 14 | 23 May 1988 | France | 8–6 | Great Britain | Bourg-en-Bresse | 1988 European Cup |
| 15 | 27 November 1988 | France | 66–0 | Belgium | Brussels, Belgium | |
| 16 | 4 March 1989 | France | 0–13 | Great Britain | Rosslyn Park, London | |
| 17 | 2 May 1989 | France | 28–0 | Spain | Unknown | |

== 1990–1995 ==
| Test | Date | France | Score | Opponent | Venue | Event |
|---|---|---|---|---|---|---|
| 18 | 14 April 1990 | France | 10–0 | Netherlands | Unknown | |
| 19 | 6 April 1991 | France | 62–0 | Japan | Aberavon, Wales | 1991 Rugby World Cup |
| 20 | 8 April 1991 | France | 37–0 | Sweden | Glamorgan Wanderers | 1991 Rugby World Cup |
| 21 | 12 April 1991 | France | 0–13 | England | Cardiff Arms Park, Wales | 1991 Rugby World Cup |
| 22 | 13 June 1992 | France | 14–10 | Spain | Bon-Encontre, France | |
| 23 | 15 November 1992 | France | 24–0 | Netherlands | Fécamp, France | |
| 24 | 4 April 1993 | France | 24–0 | Italy | Rovigo, Italy | |
| 25 | 18 February 1994 | France | 8–32 | England | Wolverhampton, England | |
| 26 | 15 April 1994 | France | 31–0 | Ireland | West of Scotland RFC | 1994 Rugby World Cup |
| 27 | 17 April 1994 | France | 99–0 | Japan | Edinburgh Academicals RFC | 1994 Rugby World Cup |
| 28 | 20 April 1994 | France | 6–18 | England | Gala | 1994 Rugby World Cup |
| 29 | 24 April 1994 | France | 27–0 | Wales | Edinburgh Academicals RFC | 1994 Rugby World Cup |
| 30 | 5 March 1995 | France | 39–10 | Ireland | Dublin, Ireland | |
| 31 | 12 April 1995 | France | 17–0 | Netherlands | Treviso, Italy | 1995 FIRA |
| 32 | 16 April 1995 | France | 6–22 | Spain | Treviso, Italy | 1995 FIRA |

== 1996 ==
| Test | Date | France | Score | Opponent | Venue | Event |
|---|---|---|---|---|---|---|
| 33 | 18 February 1996 | France | 6–15 | England | Villard-Bonnot, France | |
| 34 | 8 April 1996 | France | 53–0 | Italy | Madrid, Spain | 1996 FIRA |
| 35 | 14 April 1996 | France | 15–10 | Spain | Madrid, Spain | 1996 FIRA |
| 36 | 8 September 1996 | France | 16–39 | United States | Edmonton, Canada | 1996 Canada Cup |
| 37 | 11 September 1996 | France | 3–34 | Canada | Edmonton, Canada | 1996 Canada Cup |
| 38 | 14 September 1996 | France | 0–109 | New Zealand | Edmonton, Canada | 1996 Canada Cup |

== 1997 ==
| Test | Date | France | Score | Opponent | Venue | Event |
|---|---|---|---|---|---|---|
| 39 | 23 February 1997 | France | 17–15 | England | Northampton, England | |
| 40 | 2 April 1997 | France | 58–18 | Germany | Nice, France | 1997 FIRA |
| 41 | 4 April 1997 | France | 10–15 | England | Nice, France | 1997 FIRA |
| 42 | 6 April 1997 | France | 8–25 | Spain | Nice, France | 1997 FIRA |

== 1998 ==
| Test | Date | France | Score | Opponent | Venue | Event |
|---|---|---|---|---|---|---|
| 43 | 1 February 1998 | France | 5–13 | England | Villeneuve-d'Ascq, Lille | |
| 44 | 21 February 1998 | France | 3–19 | Scotland | Raeburn Place, Edinburgh | |
| 45 | 2 May 1998 | France | 23–6 | Kazakhstan | Amsterdam | 1998 Rugby World Cup |
| 46 | 5 May 1998 | France | 10–8 | Australia | Amsterdam | 1998 Rugby World Cup |
| 47 | 9 May 1998 | France | 7–9 | Canada | Amsterdam | 1998 Rugby World Cup |
| 48 | 12 May 1998 | France | 7–27 | Scotland | Amsterdam | 1998 Rugby World Cup |
| 49 | 16 May 1998 | France | 9–22 | Spain | Amsterdam | 1998 Rugby World Cup |

== 1999 ==
| Test | Date | France | Score | Opponent | Venue | Event |
|---|---|---|---|---|---|---|
| 50 | 7 February 1999 | France | 24–0 | Ireland | Dublin, Ireland | 1999 Five Nations |
| 51 | 5 March 1999 | France | 34–5 | Wales | Savigny-en-Barley | 1999 Five Nations |
| 52 | 21 March 1999 | France | 8–13 | England | Worcester, England | 1999 Five Nations |
| 53 | 9 April 1999 | France | 48–18 | Scotland | Melun, France | 1999 Five Nations |
| 54 | 19 April 1999 | France | 28–0 | Kazakhstan | Belluno, Italy | 1999 FIRA |
| 55 | 21 April 1999 | France | 19–0 | England | Belluno, Italy | 1999 FIRA |
| 56 | 24 April 1999 | France | 13–5 | Spain | Belluno, Italy | 1999 FIRA |

== 2000 ==
| Test | Date | France | Score | Opponent | Venue | Event |
|---|---|---|---|---|---|---|
| 57 | 4 February 2000 | France | 27–10 | Wales | Swansea, Wales | 2000 Five Nations |
| 58 | 18 February 2000 | France | 8–24 | England | Massy, Paris, France | 2000 Five Nations |
| 59 | 6 March 2000 | France | 10–7 | Scotland | Edinburgh, Scotland | 2000 Five Nations |
| 60 | 18 March 2000 | France | 38–5 | Spain | Dax, France | 2000 Five Nations |
| 61 | 8 May 2000 | France | 41–14 | Ireland | El Ejido, Spain | 2000 FIRA |
| 62 | 10 May 2000 | France | 19–12 | England | Roquetas, Spain | 2000 FIRA |
| 63 | 13 May 2000 | France | 31–0 | Spain | Almería, Spain | 2000 FIRA |

== 2001 ==
| Test | Date | France | Score | Opponent | Venue | Event |
|---|---|---|---|---|---|---|
| 64 | 3 February 2001 | France | 13–0 | Scotland | Stade de France | 2001 Five Nations |
| 65 | 16 February 2001 | France | 53–0 | Ireland | Dublin, Ireland | |
| 66 | 3 March 2001 | France | 0–6 | Spain | Madrid, Spain | 2001 Five Nations |
| 67 | 16 March 2001 | France | 24–3 | Wales | Nanterre, France | 2001 Five Nations |
| 68 | 8 April 2001 | France | 6–50 | England | Northampton | 2001 Five Nations |
| 69 | 6 May 2001 | France | 45–9 | Ireland | Marquette-lez-Lille | 2001 FIRA |
| 70 | 10 May 2001 | France | 6–9 | Scotland | Lille, France | 2001 FIRA |
| 71 | 12 May 2001 | France | 23–34 | England | Lille, France | 2001 FIRA |

== 2002 ==
| Test | Date | France | Score | Opponent | Venue | Event |
|---|---|---|---|---|---|---|
| 72 | 2 February 2002 | France | 24–0 | Spain | Bègles, France | 2002 Six Nations |
| 73 | 15 February 2002 | France | 20–0 | Wales | Brewery Field, Wales | 2002 Six Nations |
| 74 | 1 March 2002 | France | 22–17 | England | Tournon, Lyon, France | 2002 Six Nations |
| 75 | 24 March 2002 | France | 22–12 | Scotland | Inverleith, Scotland | 2002 Six Nations |
| 76 | 5 April 2002 | France | 46–0 | Ireland | Melun, France | 2002 Six Nations |
| 77 | 13 May 2002 | France | 31–12 | Kazakhstan | Barcelona, Spain | 2002 Rugby World Cup |
| 78 | 18 May 2002 | France | 21–9 | United States | Barcelona, Spain | 2002 Rugby World Cup |
| 79 | 21 May 2002 | France | 0–30 | New Zealand | Barcelona, Spain | 2002 Rugby World Cup |
| 80 | 25 May 2002 | France | 41–7 | Canada | Barcelona, Spain | 2002 Rugby World Cup |

== 2003 ==
| Test | Date | France | Score | Opponent | Venue | Event |
|---|---|---|---|---|---|---|
| 81 | 15 February 2003 | France | 0–57 | England | Twickenham, England | 2003 Six Nations |
| 82 | 22 February 2003 | France | 14–19 | Scotland | Évreux, France | 2003 Six Nations |
| 83 | 9 March 2003 | France | 20–0 | Ireland | Limerick, Ireland | 2003 Six Nations |
| 84 | 22 March 2003 | France | 27–7 | Spain | Girona, Spain | 2003 Six Nations |
| 85 | 28 March 2003 | France | 34–7 | Wales | Paris, France | 2003 Six Nations |
| 86 | 1 May 2003 | France | 9–0 | Sweden | Malmö, Sweden | 2003 FIRA |
| 87 | 3 May 2003 | France | 10–16 | Spain | Malmö, Sweden | 2003 FIRA |

== 2004 ==
| Test | Date | France | Score | Opponent | Venue | Event |
|---|---|---|---|---|---|---|
| 88 | 15 February 2004 | France | 22–5 | Ireland | Savigny-sur-Orge | 2004 Six Nations |
| 89 | 21 February 2004 | France | 24–0 | Spain | Perpignan, France | 2004 Six Nations |
| 90 | 7 March 2004 | France | 22–0 | Wales | Cardiff Arms Park | 2004 Six Nations |
| 91 | 21 March 2004 | France | 16–12 | Scotland | Murrayfield, Scotland | 2004 Six Nations |
| 92 | 27 March 2004 | France | 13–12 | England | Bourg-en-Bresse, Lyon | 2004 Six Nations |
| 93 | 1 May 2004 | France | 24–5 | Spain | Castres, France | 2004 FIRA |
| 94 | 5 May 2004 | France | 25–6 | Scotland | Toulouse, France | 2004 FIRA |
| 95 | 8 May 2004 | France | 8–6 | England | Toulouse, France | 2004 FIRA |

== 2005 ==
| Test | Date | France | Score | Opponent | Venue | Event |
|---|---|---|---|---|---|---|
| 96 | 4 February 2005 | France | 22–15 | Scotland | Roubaix, France | 2005 Six Nations |
| 97 | 13 February 2005 | France | 13–10 | England | Imber Court, London | 2005 Six Nations |
| 98 | 25 February 2005 | France | 48–0 | Wales | Bondoufle, Paris | 2005 Six Nations |
| 99 | 13 March 2005 | France | 34–0 | Ireland | Dublin | 2005 Six Nations |
| 100 | 19 March 2005 | France | 39–0 | Spain | San Boï de Llobregat | 2005 Six Nations |
| 101 | 11 November 2005 | France | 13–5 | Canada | Nantes, France | |
| 102 | 11 November 2005 | France | 29–0 | Canada | Nanterre, France | |

== 2006 ==
| Test | Date | France | Score | Opponent | Venue | Event |
|---|---|---|---|---|---|---|
| 103 | 5 February 2006 | France | 23–3 | Scotland | Murrayfield, Scotland | 2006 Six Nations |
| 104 | 10 February 2006 | France | 32–0 | Ireland | Montauban, France | 2006 Six Nations |
| 105 | 25 February 2006 | France | 38–0 | Spain | Saint-Jean-de-Luz | 2006 Six Nations |
| 106 | 11 March 2006 | France | 0–28 | England | Bondoufle, Paris | 2006 Six Nations |
| 107 | 17 March 2006 | France | 10–11 | Wales | Sardis Rd, Pontypridd | 2006 Six Nations |
| 108 | 31 August 2006 | France | 43–0 | Ireland | St. Albert | 2006 Rugby World Cup |
| 109 | 4 September 2006 | France | 24–10 | Australia | Ellerslie Rugby Park | 2006 Rugby World Cup |
| 110 | 8 September 2006 | France | 8–27 | England | St. Albert | 2006 Rugby World Cup |
| 111 | 12 September 2006 | France | 10–40 | New Zealand | Ellerslie Rugby Park | 2006 Rugby World Cup |
| 112 | 17 September 2006 | France | 17–8 | Canada | Commonwealth Stadium | 2006 Rugby World Cup |

== 2007 ==
| Test | Date | France | Score | Opponent | Venue | Event |
|---|---|---|---|---|---|---|
| 113 | 4 February 2007 | France | 37–17 | Italy | Biella, Italy | 2007 Six Nations |
| 114 | 10 February 2007 | France | 13–10 | Ireland | St Mary's RFC, Dublin | 2007 Six Nations |
| 115 | 24 February 2007 | France | 15–0 | Wales | Stade Guy Môquet | 2007 Six Nations |
| 116 | 11 March 2007 | France | 12–38 | England | Old Albanians, St Albans | 2007 Six Nations |
| 117 | 18 March 2007 | France | 18–10 | Scotland | Stade le Bout du Clos | 2007 Six Nations |
| 118 | 28 April 2007 | France | 12–0 | Sweden | Barcelona, Spain | 2007 FIRA |
| 119 | 30 April 2007 | France | 27–8 | Netherlands | Barcelona, Spain | 2007 FIRA |
| 120 | 2 May 2007 | France | 17–10 | Wales | Barcelona, Spain | 2007 FIRA |
| 121 | 5 May 2007 | France | 17–27 | England | Barcelona, Spain | 2007 FIRA |

== 2008 ==
| Test | Date | France | Score | Opponent | Venue | Event |
|---|---|---|---|---|---|---|
| 122 | 3 February 2008 | France | 43–15 | Scotland | Meggetland, Scotland | 2008 Six Nations |
| 123 | 10 February 2008 | France | 26–17 | Ireland | St Gratien, France | 2008 Six Nations |
| 124 | 23 February 2008 | France | 0–31 | England | Bergerac, Agen | 2008 Six Nations |
| 125 | 8 March 2008 | France | 35–6 | Italy | Valence, Lyon | 2008 Six Nations |
| 126 | 15 March 2008 | France | 0–3 | Wales | Taff's Well, Wales | 2008 Six Nations |
| 127 | 17 May 2008 | France | 24–3 | Netherlands | Amsterdam | 2008 FIRA |
| 128 | 20 May 2008 | France | 10–18 | Wales | Leiden, Netherlands | 2008 FIRA |
| 129 | 24 May 2008 | France | 22–22 | Ireland | Amsterdam | 2008 FIRA |

== 2009 ==
| Test | Date | France | Score | Opponent | Venue | Event |
|---|---|---|---|---|---|---|
| 130 | 6 February 2009 | France | 5–7 | Ireland | Ashbourne, County Meath | 2009 Six Nations |
| 131 | 15 February 2009 | France | 25–12 | Scotland | Arras, France | 2009 Six Nations |
| 132 | 28 February 2009 | France | 27–5 | Wales | Montauban, France | 2009 Six Nations |
| 133 | 15 March 2009 | France | 7–52 | England | London Welsh | 2009 Six Nations |
| 134 | 22 March 2009 | France | 14–10 | Italy | Turin, Italy | 2009 Six Nations |
| 135 | 10 August 2009 | France | 17–17 | South Africa | Oakville, Ontario | 2009 Nations Cup |
| 136 | 13 August 2009 | France | 8–43 | England | Oakville, Ontario | 2009 Nations Cup |
| 137 | 16 August 2009 | France | 12–7 | Canada | Oakville, Ontario | 2009 Nations Cup |
| 138 | 22 August 2009 | France | 15–15 | United States | Fletcher's Fields, Canada | 2009 Nations Cup |
| 139 | 18 November 2009 | France | 5–14 | Canada | Dijon, France | |
| 140 | 21 November 2009 | France | 22–0 | Canada | Stade de France | |

== 2010 ==
| Test | Date | France | Score | Opponent | Venue | Event |
|---|---|---|---|---|---|---|
| 141 | 6 February 2010 | France | 8–10 | Scotland | Lasswade, Scotland | 2010 Six Nations |
| 142 | 12 February 2010 | France | 19–9 | Ireland | Stade des Allées, Blois, Loir-et-Cher | 2010 Six Nations |
| 143 | 28 February 2010 | France | 15–3 | Wales | Brewery Field, Wales | 2010 Six Nations |
| 144 | 13 March 2010 | France | 45–14 | Italy | Montpellier, Hérault | 2010 Six Nations |
| 145 | 19 March 2010 | France | 10–11 | England | Rennes, Ille-et-Vilaine | 2010 Six Nations |
| 146 | 20 August 2010 | France | 15–9 | Sweden | Surrey Sports Park, Guildford | 2010 Rugby World Cup |
| 147 | 24 August 2010 | France | 17–10 | Scotland | Surrey Sports Park, Guildford | 2010 Rugby World Cup |
| 148 | 28 August 2010 | France | 23–8 | Canada | Surrey Sports Park, Guildford | 2010 Rugby World Cup |
| 149 | 1 September 2010 | France | 7–45 | New Zealand | Twickenham Stoop | 2010 Rugby World Cup |
| 150 | 5 September 2010 | France | 8–22 | Australia | Twickenham Stoop | 2010 Rugby World Cup |

== 2011 ==
| Test | Date | France | Score | Opponent | Venue | Event |
|---|---|---|---|---|---|---|
| 151 | 4 February 2011 | France | 53–3 | Scotland | Viry-Châtillon | 2011 Six Nations |
| 152 | 11 February 2011 | France | 14–12 | Ireland | Ashbourne, Ireland | 2011 Six Nations |
| 153 | 27 February 2011 | France | 3–16 | England | Sixways Stadium, England | 2011 Six Nations |
| 154 | 13 March 2011 | France | 28–20 | Italy | Benevento | 2011 Six Nations |
| 155 | 19 March 2011 | France | 15–0 | Wales | Bourgoin-Jallieu | 2011 Six Nations |
| 156 | 29 October 2011 | France | 37–0 | Italy | Stade des Arboras, Nice | |
| 157 | 5 November 2011 | France | 16–15 | England | Stade Pierre-de-Coubertin, Châteaurenard | |

== 2012 ==
| Test | Date | France | Score | Opponent | Venue | Event |
|---|---|---|---|---|---|---|
| 158 | 5 February 2012 | France | 32–0 | Italy | Stade Emile Pons, Riom | 2012 Six Nations |
| 159 | 11 February 2012 | France | 8–7 | Ireland | Stade du Hameau, Pau | 2012 Six Nations |
| 160 | 25 February 2012 | France | 23–0 | Scotland | Stirling County | 2012 Six Nations |
| 161 | 11 March 2012 | France | 3–15 | England | Stade Charléty, France | 2012 Six Nations |
| 162 | 18 March 2012 | France | 31–0 | Wales | Cross Keys | 2012 Six Nations |
| 163 | 13 May 2012 | France | 22–19 | Italy | Rovereto, Italy | 2012 FIRA |
| 164 | 16 May 2012 | France | 60–3 | Spain | Rovereto, Italy | 2012 FIRA |
| 165 | 19 May 2012 | France | 25–29 | England | Rovereto, Italy | 2012 FIRA |
| 166 | 3 November 2012 | France | 13–23 | England | Esher | |
| 167 | 21 November 2012 | France | 13–0 | United States | Stade Marcel Garcin, Orléans | |
| 168 | 24 November 2012 | France | 27–3 | United States | Stade de France, Saint-Denis | |

== 2013 ==
| Test | Date | France | Score | Opponent | Venue | Event |
|---|---|---|---|---|---|---|
| 169 | 2 February 2013 | France | 12–13 | Italy | Rovato, Brescia | 2013 Six Nations |
| 170 | 8 February 2013 | France | 32–0 | Wales | Stadium Marcel Levindrey Laon | 2013 Six Nations |
| 171 | 23 February 2013 | France | 30–20 | England | Twickenham | 2013 Six Nations |
| 172 | 8 March 2013 | France | 10–15 | Ireland | Ashbourne | 2013 Six Nations |
| 173 | 15 March 2013 | France | 76–0 | Scotland | Stade Bourillot, Dijon | 2013 Six Nations |
| 174 | 7 June 2013 | France | 10–13 | United States | Oxnard College | |
| 175 | 11 June 2013 | France | 27–25 | United States | Oxnard College | |
| 176 | 14 June 2013 | France | 18–12 | United States | StubHub Center, Carson, California | |
| 177 | 2 November 2013 | France | 27–19 | Canada | Pontarlier, France | |
| 178 | 5 November 2013 | France | 6–11 | Canada | Amnéville, France | |
| 179 | 9 November 2013 | France | 20–40 | England | Twickenham | |

== 2014 ==
| Test | Date | France | Score | Opponent | Venue | Event |
|---|---|---|---|---|---|---|
| 180 | 1 February 2014 | France | 18–6 | England | Stade des Alpes, Grenoble | 2014 Six Nations |
| 181 | 8 February 2014 | France | 29–0 | Italy | Stade Ernest-Argelès, Blagnac | 2014 Six Nations |
| 182 | 23 February 2014 | France | 27–0 | Wales | Talbot Athletic Ground | 2014 Six Nations |
| 183 | 9 March 2014 | France | 69–0 | Scotland | Howthornden, Scotland | 2014 Six Nations |
| 184 | 14 March 2014 | France | 19–15 | Ireland | Stade du Hameau, Pau | 2014 Six Nations |
| 185 | 1 July 2014 | France | 37–3 | Spain | Valladolid, Castile and León | |
| 186 | 5 July 2014 | France | 39–8 | South Africa | Marcoussis | |
| 187 | 1 August 2014 | France | 26–0 | Wales | CNR, Marcoussis Pitch 1 | 2014 Rugby World Cup |
| 188 | 5 August 2014 | France | 55–3 | South Africa | CNR, Marcoussis Pitch 1 | 2014 Rugby World Cup |
| 189 | 9 August 2014 | France | 17–3 | Australia | CNR, Marcoussis Pitch 1 | 2014 Rugby World Cup |
| 190 | 13 August 2014 | France | 16–18 | Canada | Stade Jean-Bouin, Paris | 2014 Rugby World Cup |
| 191 | 17 August 2014 | France | 25–18 | Ireland | Stade Jean-Bouin, Paris | 2014 Rugby World Cup |

== 2015 ==
| Test | Date | France | Score | Opponent | Venue | Event |
|---|---|---|---|---|---|---|
| 192 | 7 February 2015 | France | 42–0 | Scotland | Stade Henri Desgrange, France | 2015 Six Nations |
| 193 | 13 February 2015 | France | 10–5 | Ireland | Ashbourne | 2015 Six Nations |
| 194 | 27 February 2015 | France | 28–7 | Wales | Stade Sapiac, Montauban | 2015 Six Nations |
| 195 | 14 March 2015 | France | 12–17 | Italy | Badia Polesine, Rovigo | 2015 Six Nations |
| 196 | 21 March 2015 | France | 21–15 | England | Twickenham Stoop, England | 2015 Six Nations |
| 197 | 7 November 2015 | France | 11–0 | England | Stade Francis Turcan, Martigues | |

== 2016 ==
| Test | Date | France | Score | Opponent | Venue | Event |
|---|---|---|---|---|---|---|
| 198 | 6 February 2016 | France | 39–0 | Italy | Stade Marcel-Verchère, Bourg-en-Bresse | 2016 Six Nations |
| 199 | 13 February 2016 | France | 18–6 | Ireland | Stade Aimé Giral, Perpignan | 2016 Six Nations |
| 200 | 28 February 2016 | France | 8–10 | Wales | The Gnoll, Neath | 2016 Six Nations |
| 201 | 11 March 2016 | France | 24–0 | Scotland | Broadwood Stadium, Cumbernauld | 2016 Six Nations |
| 202 | 18 March 2016 | France | 17–12 | England | Stade de la Rabine, Vannes | 2016 Six Nations |
| 203 | 1 July 2016 | France | 19–13 | United States | Regional Athletic Complex, Utah | 2016 Super Series |
| 204 | 5 July 2016 | France | 13–17 | England | Regional Athletic Complex, Utah | 2016 Super Series |
| 205 | 9 July 2016 | France | 10–29 | Canada | Regional Athletic Complex, Utah | 2016 Super Series |
| 206 | 9 November 2016 | France | 5–10 | England | Twickenham Stoop, England | |
| 207 | 22 November 2016 | France | 36–10 | United States | Béziers | |
| 208 | 25 November 2016 | France | 31–6 | United States | Montpellier | |

== 2017 ==
| Test | Date | France | Score | Opponent | Venue | Event |
|---|---|---|---|---|---|---|
| 209 | 4 February 2017 | France | 13–26 | England | Twickenham Stadium, England | 2017 Six Nations |
| 210 | 11 February 2017 | France | 55–0 | Scotland | Stade Marcel-Deflandre, France | 2017 Six Nations |
| 211 | 26 February 2017 | France | 10–13 | Ireland | Donnybrook Stadium, Ireland | 2017 Six Nations |
| 212 | 12 March 2017 | France | 28–5 | Italy | Stadio Sergio Lanfranchi, Italy | 2017 Six Nations |
| 213 | 18 March 2017 | France | 39–19 | Wales | Stade Amédée-Domenech, France | 2017 Six Nations |
| 214 | 9 August 2017 | France | 72–14 | Japan | Billings Park UCD, Dublin | 2017 Rugby World Cup |
| 215 | 13 August 2017 | France | 48–0 | Australia | UCD Bowl, Dublin | 2017 Rugby World Cup |
| 216 | 17 August 2017 | France | 21–5 | Ireland | UCD Bowl, Dublin | 2017 Rugby World Cup |
| 217 | 22 August 2017 | France | 3–20 | England | Kingspan Stadium, Belfast | 2017 Rugby World Cup |
| 218 | 26 August 2017 | France | 31–23 | United States | Kingspan Stadium, Belfast | 2017 Rugby World Cup |

== 2018 ==
| Test | Date | France | Score | Opponent | Venue | Event |
|---|---|---|---|---|---|---|
| 219 | 3 February 2018 | France | 24–0 | Ireland | Stade Ernest-Wallon, France | 2018 Six Nations |
| 220 | 10 February 2018 | France | 26–3 | Scotland | Scotstoun Stadium, Scotland | 2018 Six Nations |
| 221 | 24 February 2018 | France | 57–0 | Italy | Stade Furiani, Italy | 2018 Six Nations |
| 222 | 10 March 2018 | France | 18–17 | England | Stade des Alpes, France | 2018 Six Nations |
| 223 | 16 March 2018 | France | 38–3 | Wales | Parc Eirias, Wales | 2018 Six Nations |
| 224 | 9 November 2018 | France | 0–14 | New Zealand | Stade Mayol, France | |
| 225 | 17 November 2018 | France | 30–27 | New Zealand | Stade des Alpes, France | |

== 2019 ==
| Test | Date | France | Score | Opponent | Venue | Event |
|---|---|---|---|---|---|---|
| 226 | 2 February 2019 | France | 52–3 | Wales | Altrad Stadium, France | 2019 Six Nations |
| 227 | 10 February 2019 | France | 26–41 | England | Castle Park Rugby Stadium, England | 2019 Six Nations |
| 228 | 23 February 2019 | France | 41–10 | Scotland | Stadium Lille Métropole, France | 2019 Six Nations |
| 229 | 9 March 2019 | France | 47–17 | Ireland | Donnybrook, Dublin, Ireland | 2019 Six Nations |
| 230 | 17 March 2019 | France | 12–31 | Italy | Stadio Plebiscito, Italy | 2019 Six Nations |
| 231 | 2 July 2019 | France | 19–36 | Canada | Chula Vista, San Diego | 2019 Super Series |
| 232 | 6 July 2019 | France | 25–16 | New Zealand | Chula Vista, San Diego | 2019 Super Series |
| 233 | 10 July 2019 | France | 18–20 | England | Chula Vista, San Diego | 2019 Super Series |
| 234 | 14 July 2019 | France | 53–14 | United States | Chula Vista, San Diego | 2019 Super Series |
| 235 | 9 November 2019 | France | 10–20 | England | Stade Marcel-Michelin, Montferrand | |
| 236 | 16 November 2019 | France | 15–17 | England | Sandy Park, Exeter | |

== 2020 ==
| Test | Date | France | Score | Opponent | Venue | Event |
|---|---|---|---|---|---|---|
| 237 | 2 February 2020 | France | 13–19 | England | Stade du Hameau, Pau | 2020 Six Nations |
| 238 | 8 February 2020 | France | 45–10 | Italy | Stade Beaublanc, Limoges | 2020 Six Nations |
| 239 | 23 February 2020 | France | 50–0 | Wales | Cardiff Arms Park, Wales | 2020 Six Nations |
| 240 | 25 October 2020 | France | 13–13 | Scotland | Scotstoun, Glasgow | 2020 Six Nations |
| 241 | 14 November 2020 | France | 10–33 | England | Stade des Alpes, Grenoble | |
| 242 | 21 November 2020 | France | 23–25 | England | Twickenham | |

== 2021 ==
| Test | Date | France | Score | Opponent | Venue | Event |
|---|---|---|---|---|---|---|
| 243 | 3 April 2021 | France | 53–0 | Wales | Stade de la Rabine, Vannes | 2021 Six Nations |
| 244 | 17 April 2021 | France | 56–15 | Ireland | Donnybrook, Dublin | 2021 Six Nations |
| 245 | 24 April 2021 | France | 6–10 | England | Twickenham Stoop | 2021 Six Nations |
| 246 | 30 April 2021 | France | 15–17 (Note: Play was abandoned after 62 minutes due to floodlight failure. As a result of playing over 60 minutes, England were awarded the win.) | England | Stadium Lille Métropole, Villeneuve-d'Ascq | |
| 247 | 6 November 2021 | France | 46–3 | South Africa | Stade de la Rabine, Vannes | |
| 248 | 13 November 2021 | France | 38–13 | New Zealand | Stade du Hameau, Pau | |
| 249 | 20 November 2021 | France | 29–7 | New Zealand | Stade Pierre-Fabre, Castres | |

== 2022 ==
| Test | Date | France | Score | Opponent | Venue | Event |
|---|---|---|---|---|---|---|
| 250 | 27 March 2022 | France | 39–6 | Italy | Stade des Alpes, Grenoble | 2022 Six Nations |
| 251 | 2 April 2022 | France | 40–5 | Ireland | Stade Ernest Wallon, Toulouse | 2022 Six Nations |
| 252 | 10 April 2022 | France | 28–8 | Scotland | Scotstoun Stadium, Glasgow | 2022 Six Nations |
| 253 | 22 April 2022 | France | 33–5 | Wales | Cardiff Arms Park, Cardiff | 2022 Six Nations |
| 254 | 30 April 2022 | France | 12–24 | England | Stade Jean Dauger, Bayonne | 2022 Six Nations |
| 255 | 3 September 2022 | France | 21–0 | Italy | Stade des Arboras, Nice | |
| 256 | 9 September 2022 | France | 19–26 | Italy | Stadio del Rugby, Biella | |
| 257 | 8 October 2022 | France | 40–5 | South Africa | Eden Park, Auckland | 2021 Rugby World Cup |
| 258 | 15 October 2022 | France | 7–13 | England | Northland Events Centre, Whangārei | 2021 Rugby World Cup |
| 259 | 22 October 2022 | France | 44–0 | Fiji | Northland Events Centre, Whangārei | 2021 Rugby World Cup |
| 260 | 29 October 2022 | France | 39–3 | Italy | Northland Events Centre, Whangārei | 2021 Rugby World Cup |
| 261 | 5 November 2022 | France | 24–25 | New Zealand | Eden Park, Auckland | 2021 Rugby World Cup |
| 262 | 12 November 2022 | France | 36–0 | Canada | Eden Park, Auckland | 2021 Rugby World Cup |

== 2023 ==
| Test | Date | France | Score | Opponent | Venue | Event |
|---|---|---|---|---|---|---|
| 263 | 26 March 2023 | France | 22–12 | Italy | Stadio Sergio Lanfranchi, Parma | 2023 Six Nations |
| 264 | 1 April 2023 | France | 53–3 | Ireland | Musgrave Park, Cork | 2023 Six Nations |
| 265 | 16 April 2023 | France | 55–0 | Scotland | Stade de la Rabine, Vannes | 2023 Six Nations |
| 266 | 23 April 2023 | France | 39–14 | Wales | Stade des Alpes, Grenoble | 2023 Six Nations |
| 267 | 29 April 2023 | France | 33–38 | England | Twickenham Stadium, London | 2023 Six Nations |
| 268 | 21 October 2023 | France | 18–17 | New Zealand | Wellington Regional Stadium, Wellington | 2023 WXV 1 |
| 269 | 28 October 2023 | France | 20–29 | Australia | Forsyth Barr Stadium, Dunedin | 2023 WXV 1 |
| 270 | 4 November 2023 | France | 20–29 | Canada | Mount Smart Stadium, Auckland | 2023 WXV 1 |

== 2024 ==
| Test | Date | Opponent | PF | PA | Venue | Event |
|---|---|---|---|---|---|---|
| 271 | 23 March 2024 | Ireland | 38 | 17 | Stade Marie-Marvingt, Le Mans | 2024 Six Nations |
| 272 | 30 March 2024 | Scotland | 15 | 5 | Edinburgh Rugby Stadium, Edinburgh | 2024 Six Nations |
| 273 | 14 April 2024 | Italy | 38 | 15 | Stade Jean-Bouin, Paris | 2024 Six Nations |
| 274 | 21 April 2024 | Wales | 40 | 0 | Cardiff Arms Park, Cardiff | 2024 Six Nations |
| 275 | 27 April 2024 | England | 21 | 42 | Stade Chaban-Delmas, Bordeaux | 2024 Six Nations |
| 276 | 7 September 2024 | England | 19 | 38 | Kingsholm Stadium, Gloucester | |
| 277 | 29 September 2024 | Canada | 24 | 46 | BC Place, Vancouver | 2024 WXV 1 |
| 278 | 5 October 2024 | United States | 22 | 14 | Langley Events Centre, Langley | 2024 WXV 1 |
| 279 | 12 October 2024 | New Zealand | 14 | 39 | BC Place, Vancouver | 2024 WXV 1 |

== 2025 ==
| Test | Date | Opponent | PF | PA | Venue | Event |
|---|---|---|---|---|---|---|
| 280 | 22 March 2025 | Ireland | 27 | 15 | Ravenhill Stadium, Belfast | 2025 Six Nations |
| 281 | 29 March 2025 | Scotland | 38 | 15 | Stade Marcel-Deflandre, La Rochelle | 2025 Six Nations |
| 282 | 12 April 2025 | Wales | 42 | 12 | Stade Amédée-Domenech, Brive-la-Gaillarde | 2025 Six Nations |
| 283 | 19 April 2025 | Italy | 34 | 21 | Stadio Sergio Lanfranchi, Parma | 2025 Six Nations |
| 284 | 26 April 2025 | England | 42 | 43 | Twickenham Stadium, London | 2025 Six Nations |
| 285 | 9 August 2025 | England | 6 | 40 | Stade André et Guy Boniface, Mont-de-Marsan | 2025 World Cup Warm-Ups |
| 286 | 23 August 2025 | Italy | 24 | 0 | Sandy Park, Exeter | 2025 World Cup |
| 287 | 31 August 2025 | Brazil | 84 | 5 | Franklin's Gardens, Northampton | 2025 World Cup |
| 288 | 7 September 2025 | South Africa | 57 | 10 | Franklin's Gardens, Northampton | 2025 World Cup |
| 289 | 14 September 2025 | Ireland | 18 | 13 | Sandy Park, Exeter | 2025 World Cup |
| 290 | 20 September 2025 | England | 17 | 35 | Ashton Gate, Bristol | 2025 World Cup |
| 291 | 27 September 2025 | New Zealand | 26 | 42 | Twickenham Stadium, London | 2025 World Cup |

== 2026 ==
| Test | Date | Opponent | PF | PA | Venue | Event |
|---|---|---|---|---|---|---|
| 292 | 11 April 2026 | Italy | 40 | 7 | Stade des Alpes, Grenoble | 2026 Six Nations |
| 293 | 18 April 2026 | Wales | 7 | 38 | Cardiff Arms Park, Cardiff | 2026 Six Nations |
| 294 | 25 April 2026 | Ireland | 26 | 7 | Stade Marcel-Michelin, Clermont-Ferrand | 2026 Six Nations |
| 295 | 9 May 2026 | Scotland | TBD | TBD | Edinburgh Rugby Stadium, Edinburgh | 2026 Six Nations |
| 296 | 17 May 2026 | England | TBD | TBD | Stade Atlantique, Bordeaux | 2026 Six Nations |
| 297 | 17 May 2026 | New Zealand | TBD | TBD | Stade de Gerland, Lyon | Home test series (2026 WXV) |
| 298 | 17 May 2026 | Australia | TBD | TBD | Stade Maurice David, Aix-en-Provence | Home test series (2026 WXV) |
| 299 | 17 May 2026 | Canada | TBD | TBD | Stade Marcel-Deflandre, La Rochelle | Home test series (2026 WXV) |
| 300 | 17 October 2026 | New Zealand | TBD | TBD | Waikato Stadium, Hamilton | Away test series (2026 WXV) |
| 301 | 24 October 2026 | New Zealand | TBD | TBD | Okara Park, Whangārei | Away test series (2026 WXV) |
| 302 | 31 October 2026 | New Zealand | TBD | TBD | Te Kaha, Christchurch | Away test series (2026 WXV) |

== Other internationals ==
| Date | France | Score | Opponent | Venue | Event |
|---|---|---|---|---|---|
| 11 April 1994 | France | 77–8 | (Scotland) Scottish Students | West of Scotland RFC | 1994 Rugby World Cup |
| 1996 | France A | 0–32 | Basque Country | Unknown | |
| 2 April 2000 | France A | 22–11 | Italy | Marseille, France | |
| 18 March 2001 | France A | 39–0 | Netherlands | Unknown | |
| 16 February 2002 | France A | 53–5 | Netherlands | Amsterdam, Netherlands | |
| 22 February 2002 | France A | 46–5 | Netherlands | Unknown | |
| 29 March 2003 | France A | 5–25 | Wales A | Paris, France | |
| 5 March 2004 | France A | 8–5 | Wales A | Llanrumney, Wales | |
| 27 March 2004 | France A | 14–32 | England A | Bourg-en-Bresse, France | |
| 12 February 2005 | France A | 6–29 | England A | Imber Court | |
| 26 February 2005 | France A | 12–17 | Netherlands | Amsterdam | |
| 18 March 2006 | France A | 47–7 | Netherlands | Metz, France | |
| 11 February 2007 | France A | 29–5 | Netherlands | Purmerend, Netherlands | |
| 11 March 2007 | France A | 7–21 | England A | Old Albanians, St Albans | |
| 10 February 2008 | France A | 37–7 | Netherlands | St Gratien, France | |
| 23 February 2008 | France A | 0–3 | England A | Bergerac, Agen, France | |
| 15 February 2009 | France A | 61–0 | Scotland Development | Arras, France | |
| 28 February 2009 | France A | 42–0 | Netherlands | Amsterdam | |
| 15 March 2009 | France A | 5–38 | England A | London Welsh | |
| 6 February 2010 | France A | 26–3 | Scotland A | Lasswade, Scotland | |
| 14 February 2010 | France A | 37–3 | Netherlands | Fécamp, France | |
| 19 March 2010 | France A | 20–0 | England A | Rennes, France | |
| 8 May 2010 | France A | 70–0 | Belgium | Longwy, France | 2010 FIRA Trophy |
| 10 May 2010 | France A | 5–22 | Spain | Verdun, France | 2010 FIRA Trophy |
| 12 May 2010 | France A | 5–14 | Netherlands | Metz, France | 2010 FIRA Trophy |
| 15 May 2010 | France A | 35–0 | Russia | Stade de la Meinau, Strasbourg | 2010 FIRA Trophy |
| 30 April 2011 | France A | 40–3 | Sweden | INEF Bastiagueiro | 2011 FIRA Trophy |
| 2 May 2011 | France A | 11–12 | Spain | University of Coruña | 2011 FIRA Trophy |
| 4 May 2011 | France A | 109–3 | Finland | INEF Bastiagueiro | 2011 FIRA Trophy |
| 7 May 2011 | France A | 17–7 | Italy A | University of Coruña | 2011 FIRA Trophy |
| 2 November 2011 | France XV | 14–5 | England XV | Stade Jean-Bouin, Paris | |
