= Samantha Pankey =

American rugby union player

- Born: August 6, 1983 (age 43)
- Height: 1.7 m (5 ft 7 in)
- Weight: 76 kg (168 lb; 12 st 0 lb)

Rugby union career
- Position: Hooker
International career
Years	Team	Apps	(Points)
2011-Present	United States	19	(5)

Samantha Pankey (born August 6, 1983) is an American rugby union player. She made her debut for the United States at the 2011 Nations Cup. She was named in the Eagles 2017 Women's Rugby World Cup squad.

== Early career ==
Pankey attended Buckingham County High School and played basketball, softball and volleyball. She played basketball at East Carolina University where she did a double major in English/Creative writing and Communication/Journalism. She began her rugby career in 2009 after a friend introduced her to the sport.

She currently plays for the San Diego Surfers and previously played for the James River R.F.C, the Washington Furies and the Scion Sirens.
