= Lydia Crossman =

New Zealand rugby player

- Born: 29 September 1986 (age 40)
- Height: 1.72 m (5 ft 8 in)

Rugby union career
- Position: Loose forward
Provincial / State sides
| Years | Team | Apps | (Points) |
| 2007–16 | Auckland | 52 | (70) |
| 2011 | Hawkes Bay | 5 | (0) |
| 2018 | North Harbour | 3 | (0) |
International career
| Years | Team | Apps | (Points) |
| 2011–2012 | New Zealand | 5 | (0) |

Lydia Kerr (nee Crossman) (born 29 September 1986) is a former New Zealand rugby union player.

== Biography ==
Kerr began playing rugby at the age of five. She captained her Epsom Girls' Grammar School rugby team.

Lydia was named in the Black Ferns squad in a three Test tour to England in 2011. She made her international debut on 29 November 2011 against England at Esher.

A year later, Lydia was again selected for the Black Ferns, this time for another three-Test tour of England. She was sin binned in the first test for an infringement. Crossman made her final appearance for New Zealand in the third test of that tour.

In 2016, Kerr was named in a wider training squad.
