= Carmen Farmer =

American rugby player and attorney

- Born: December 4, 1980 (age 45)
- Education: Virginia Tech
- Height: 6 ft 1 in (185 cm)
- Weight: 180 lb (82 kg)

Rugby union career
- Position: Lock
International career
Years	Team	Apps	(Points)
2013	United States		
National sevens team
Years	Team		Comps
2016	United States		

Carmen Farmer (born December 4, 1980) is an American rugby player and attorney. In 2016, she was named to the United States women's national rugby union team for the 2016 Summer Olympics in Rio de Janeiro.

== Early life ==
Farmer grew up in Richmond, Virginia. As a high school student, she played softball, volleyball, and basketball. Farmer attended the Virginia Tech where she received a full scholarship for softball. She was the starting shortstop on the team from 2000 through 2003.

== Career ==
After college, Farmer attended law school at the University of Maryland, graduating in 2006. She then worked as an attorney for the non-profit Eastern Shore Land Conservancy.

=== Rugby player ===
Farmer started playing rugby at age 31 after a friend from Australia recommended she try the sport. Farmer decided to try the sport for fun and found the closest rugby club to where she lived, located in Annapolis, Maryland. In 2012, she began playing 15 player rugby at Severn River in Maryland. The Severn River team reached the national championship game that year where a national team coach approached Farmer. Farmer played her first game for a United States national team in 2013.

By 2014 Farmer was playing rugby sevens and had progressed enough to play for the United States in the World Cup. In April 2015 she moved to Chula Vista, California to train at the national training facility. Farmer was part of the U.S. team that secured a spot in the 2016 Summer Olympics at the 2015 NACRA Sevens Championships. In July 2016, Farmer was chosen for the U.S. Olympic team in Rio de Janeiro. At 6-foot-1, Farmer stands out as a player for her combination of size and speed.
