= Zoey Berry =

New Zealand rugby player

- Born: 1 October 1987 (age 39) Lower Hutt, New Zealand

Rugby union career
- Position: Scrum-half
Provincial / State sides
Years	Team	Apps	(Points)
2007–2009	Otago	12	(2)
2011–2012	Canterbury	15	(13)
International career
Years	Team	Apps	(Points)
2012	New Zealand	1	(0)

Zoey Berry (born 1 October 1987) is a former New Zealand rugby union player. She played 12 years of representative rugby for Canterbury. She made her only appearance for New Zealand on 27 November 2012 against England at Aldershot.

Berry served a four-year ban between 2017 and 2021 in relation to an anti-doping rule violation after testing positive for clenbuterol.
