= Heather Fisher =

England international rugby union player

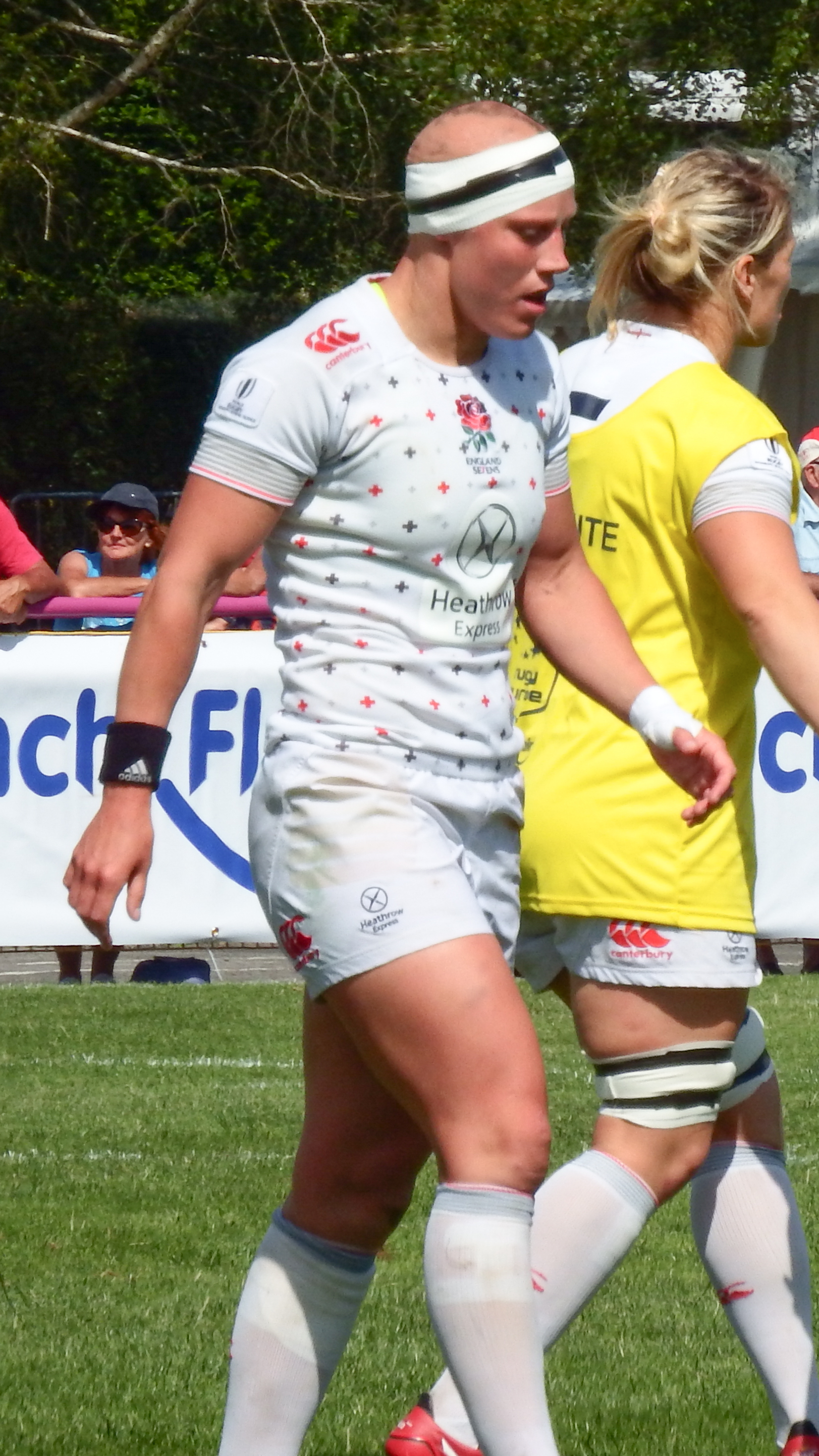
- Full name: Heather Margaret Fisher
- Born: 13 June 1984 (age 42) Birmingham, West Midlands, England
- Height: 1.68 m (5 ft 6 in)
- Weight: 74 kg (163 lb)

Rugby union career
- Position: Flanker
Senior career
Years	Team	Apps	(Points)
- Worcester
International career
Years	Team	Apps	(Points)
2009	England	27	(35)
National sevens teams
Years	Team		Comps
- England
2016	Great Britain 7s		
Medal record
Representing England
Women's rugby sevens
Commonwealth Games
Bronze medal – third place	2018 Gold Coast	Team competition
Women's rugby union
Rugby World Cup
Gold medal – first place	2014 France	Team competition
Silver medal – second place	2010 England	Team competition

Heather Margaret Fisher (born 13 June 1984) is an English rugby union and rugby sevens player. She represented England at the 2010 Women's Rugby World Cup. She was also named in the squad to the 2014 Women's Rugby World Cup.

Fisher made her international rugby debut in 2009 after a stint in bobsledding. She represented Team GB in rugby sevens at the 2016 Summer Olympics. Great Britain lost the rugby sevens bronze medal match to Canada.

She has severe alopecia. She has talked about the discrimination and insults she has faced as a result of having no hair.
