= Christelle Chobet =

French rugby union player

- Born: 22 April 1986 (age 40)
- Height: 1.68 m (5 ft 6 in)
- Weight: 93 kg (205 lb; 14 st 9 lb)

Rugby union career
- Position: Prop
Senior career
Years	Team	Apps	(Points)
- Lons
International career
Years	Team	Apps	(Points)
- France

Christelle Chobet (born 22 April 1986) is a French rugby union player. She represented France at the 2014 Women's Rugby World Cup. She was in the squad that toured the United States in a successful three test series in 2013.
