= Kimber Rozier =

American rugby union player

- Born: July 20, 1989 (age 37)
- Education: University of North Carolina-Chapel Hill
- Height: 5 ft 3 in (160 cm)
- Weight: 135 lb (61 kg)

Rugby union career
- Position: Fly half
Senior career
Years	Team	Apps	(Points)
- Harlequins Ladies
International career
Years	Team	Apps	(Points)
2012	United States	19	
National sevens team
Years	Team		Comps
2013	United States 7s		

Kimber Rozier (born July 20, 1989) is an American rugby union player. She made her debut for the United States in 2012 and for the Eagles sevens at the 2011 Dubai Women's Sevens. She was named in the Eagles 2017 Women's Rugby World Cup squad. She previously competed at the 2014 Women's Rugby World Cup in France.

Rozier plays in the Premier 15s for the Harlequins Ladies. She is a NSCA certified strength and conditioning specialist. She has dual Bachelor’s degrees in Exercise and Sport Science and Spanish. She was part of the Eagles sevens team that won bronze at the 2013 Rugby World Cup Sevens.

She began her rugby career as a freshman in 2007 at the University of North Carolina at Chapel Hill.
