= Melodie Bosman =

New Zealand rugby player

- Born: 26 June 1976 (age 50)
- Height: 1.64 m (5 ft 5 in)
- Weight: 80 kg (176 lb)

Rugby union career
- Position: Prop
Provincial / State sides
| Years | Team | Apps | (Points) |
| 2010–2013 | Canterbury | | (0) |
| 2006 | Hawke's Bay | | (0) |
| 2001–2002, 2004 | Auckland | | (0) |
| 2003 | Waikato | | (0) |
International career
| Years | Team | Apps | (Points) |
| 2004–2013 | New Zealand | 17 | (0) |
Medal record
Representing New Zealand
Women's rugby union
Rugby World Cup
| Gold medal – first place | 2006 Canada | Team competition |
| Gold medal – first place | 2010 England | Team competition |

Melodie Bosman (née Ngatai; born 25 June 1976) is a former New Zealand female rugby union player. She played internationally for New Zealand and provincially for Canterbury.

Bosman has represented several provincial sides; she first played 8 seasons for Waikato before playing for Auckland, Canterbury, Hawke's Bay, and Wellington.

Bosman made her international debut for the Black Ferns on 8 June 2004 against Canada at Vancouver. She was part of two successful Rugby World Cup campaigns when the Black Ferns won the 2006 and 2010 tournaments.

In 2013, Bosman played in the International Series against England winning all three games. She was appointed as Head Coach of the Tasman Mako in the Farah Palmer Cup in 2020.
