= Aurélie Bailon =

French rugby union player

- Born: 16 January 1987 (age 39)

Rugby union career
- Position: Flyhalf
International career
| Years | Team | Apps | (Points) |
| | France | 23 | |

Aurélie Bailon (born 16 January 1987) is a French female rugby union player, who played as Fly-half. She represented France at the 2010 Women's Rugby World Cup. France lost to the Black Ferns in the semi-finals. She returned from injury to play in the 2013 Women's Six Nations Championship match against Ireland.
