= Rawinia Everitt =

New Zealand rugby union and netball player

- Born: 4 September 1986 (age 40) Auckland, New Zealand
- Height: 1.76 m (5 ft 9 in)
- Weight: 81 kg (179 lb)

Rugby union career
- Position: Loose forward
Provincial / State sides
Years	Team	Apps	(Points)
- Counties Manukau
International career
Years	Team	Apps	(Points)
2011–2017	New Zealand	21	(25)
Medal record
Women's rugby union
Representing New Zealand
Women's Rugby World Cup
Gold medal – first place	2017 Ireland	Team competition

Rawinia Everitt (born 4 September 1986 in Auckland) is a New Zealand rugby union and netball player. Everitt played netball in the ANZ Championship for the Northern Mystics from 2008 to 2009.

== Rugby union career ==
She was called into the Black Ferns squad to tour England in 2011. Everitt was also included in the 2014 Women's Rugby World Cup squad. She was named in the 2017 Women's Rugby World Cup squad.
