= Laëtitia Grand =

French rugby union player (born 1990)

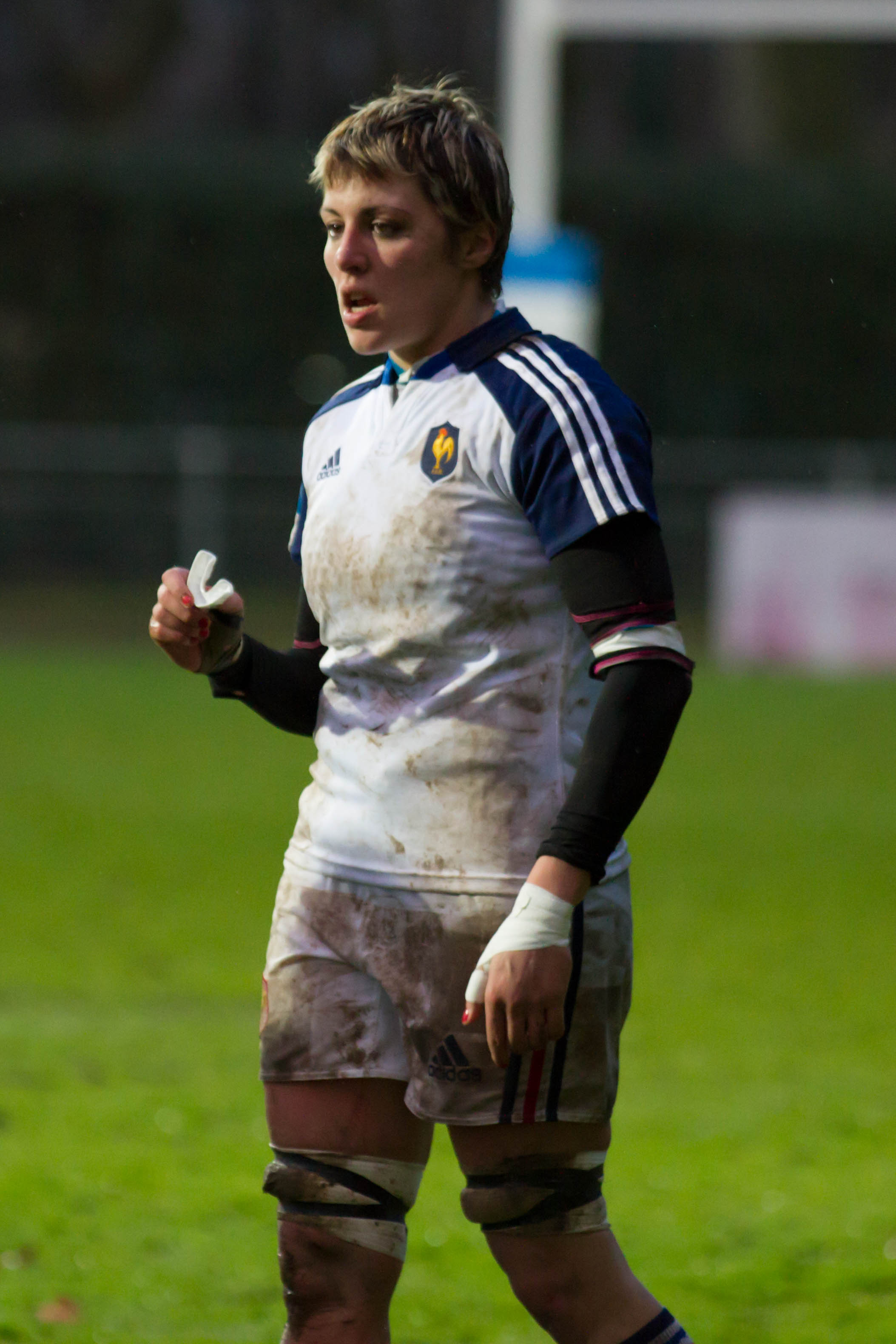
- Grand after France's match against Italy at the 2014 Six Nations.
- Born: 26 July 1990 (age 36)
- Height: 1.75 m (5 ft 9 in)
- Weight: 80 kg (180 lb; 12 st 8 lb)

Rugby union career
- Position: Loose forward
Senior career
Years	Team	Apps	(Points)
- Lons
International career
Years	Team	Apps	(Points)
2012-Present	France		

Laëtitia Grand (born 26 July 1990) is a French rugby union player. She represented France at the 2014 Women's Rugby World Cup and was also a member of the squad that won their fourth Six Nations title in 2014.

Grand also toured the United States in a successful three-test series with France in 2013.
