= Lucille Godiveau =

French rugby union player

- Born: 18 April 1987 (age 39)

Rugby union career
- Position: Centre
Senior career
Years	Team	Apps	(Points)
- AC Bobigny Stade Rennais Rugby AS Bayonne
International career
Years	Team	Apps	(Points)
	France	17	
National sevens team
Years	Team		Comps
- France

Lucille Godiveau (born 18 April 1987) is a French female rugby union player. She represented France at the 2010 Women's Rugby World Cup.

She was a member of the 2013 squad that played Canada and England. She was also named in the French squad in the 2017 Women's Six Nations Championship.
