= Hélène Ezanno =

French rugby union player

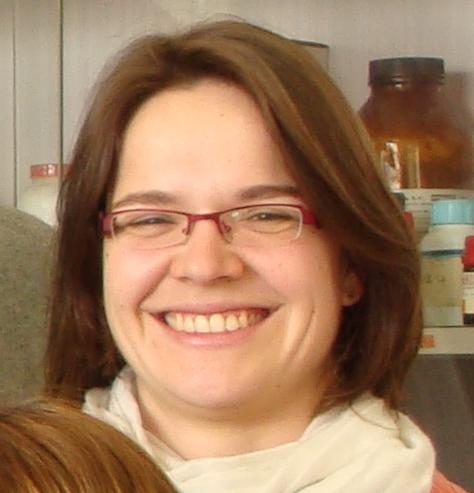
- Born: 28 August 1984 (age 42)
- Height: 1.7 m (5 ft 7 in)
- Weight: 76 kg (168 lb; 12 st 0 lb)

Rugby union career
- Position: Prop
Senior career
| Years | Team | Apps | (Points) |
- Lille
International career
| Years | Team | Apps | (Points) |
- France

Hélène Ezanno (born 28 August 1984) is a French rugby union player. She represented France at the 2014 Women's Rugby World Cup. She was a member of the squad that won their fourth Six Nations title in 2014.

Ezanno was in the squad that toured the United States in a successful three-test series in 2013.
