= Emma Croker =

England international rugby union player

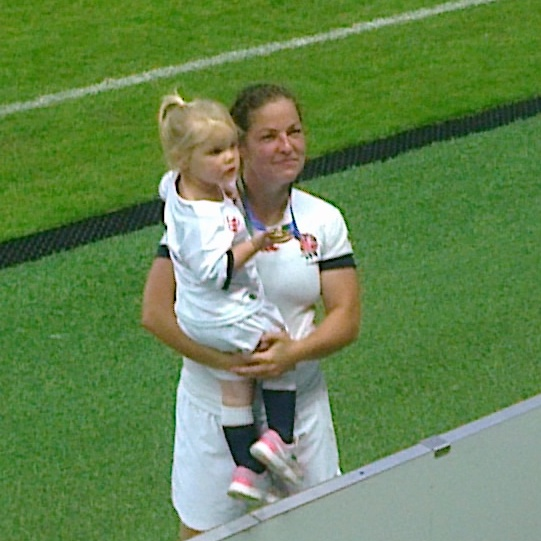
- After the game in France in 2014
- Born: 29 September 1982 (age 44) Chelmsford, Essex, England
- Height: 1.62 m (5 ft 4 in)
- Weight: 72 kg (159 lb; 11 st 5 lb)

Rugby union career
- Position: Hooker
Senior career
Years	Team	Apps	(Points)
- Richmond
International career
Years	Team	Apps	(Points)
2007–2016	England	64	(10)
Medal record
Representing England
Women's rugby union
Rugby World Cup
Gold medal – first place	2014 France	Team competition
Silver medal – second place	2010 England	Team competition

Emma Elizabeth Croker (née Layland; born 29 September 1982) is an English female rugby union player, weight lifter and teacher. She represented England at the 2010 Women's Rugby World Cup and she was chosen for the 2014 Women's Rugby World Cup squad. She previously led the P.E department at Swakeleys School for Girls and is now Director of Sport at Queens College London.

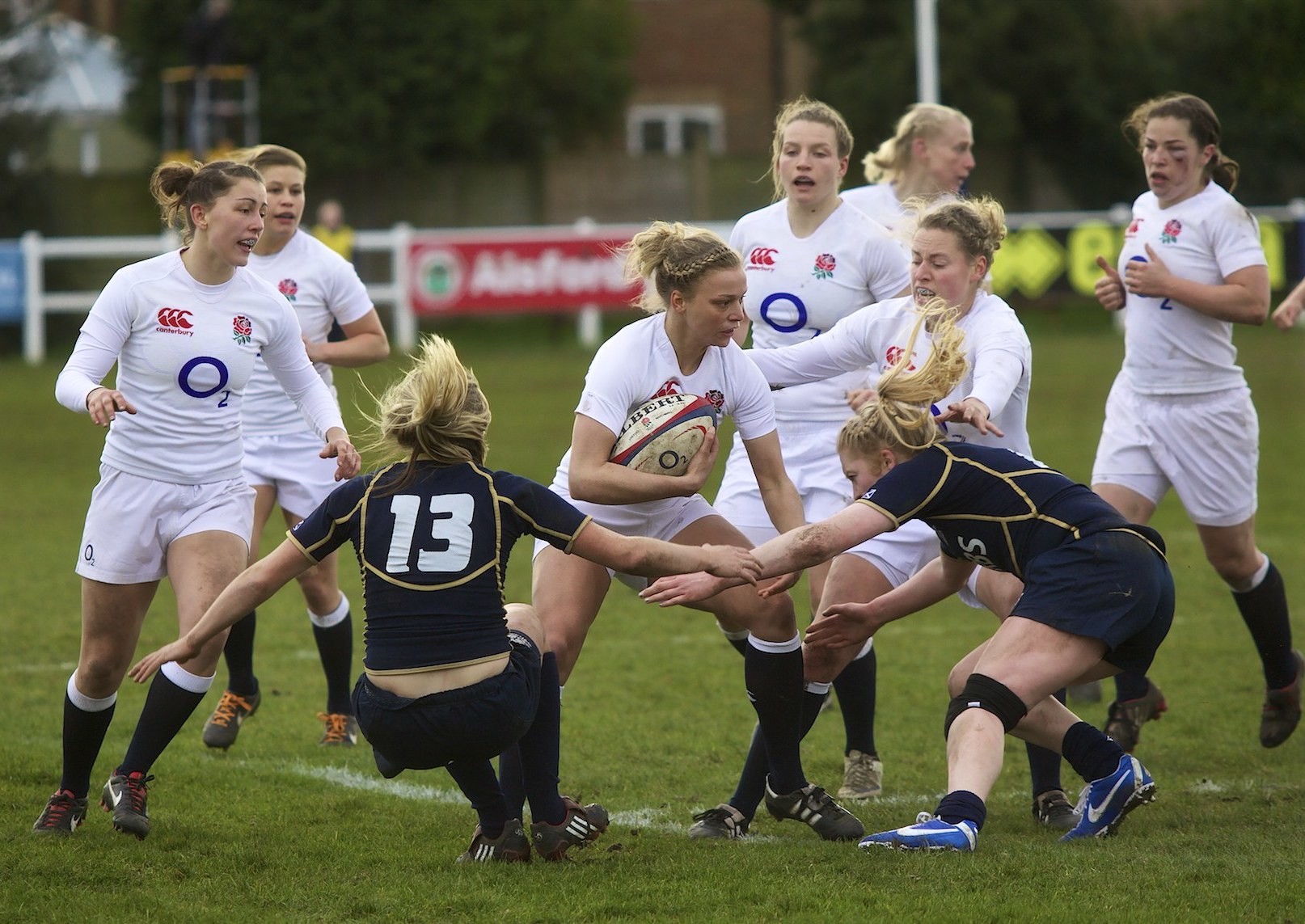
Croker is on the right with a black eye
