= Sandra Rabier =

French rugby union player

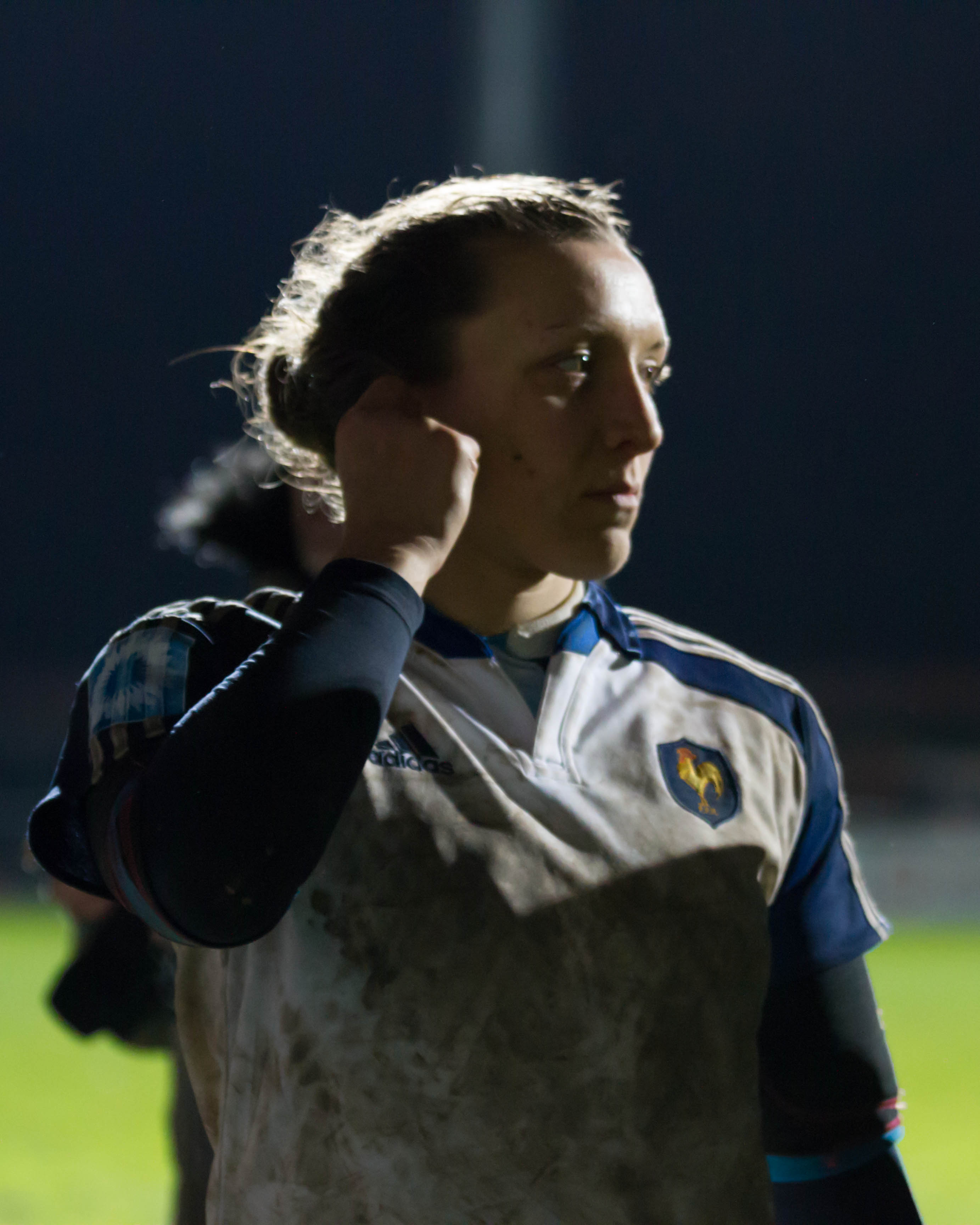
- Born: 1 March 1985 (age 41)
- Height: 1.68 m (5 ft 6 in)
- Weight: 60 kg (130 lb; 9 st 6 lb)

Rugby union career
- Position: No. 8, Lock
International career
Years	Team	Apps	(Points)
	France	26	

Sandra Rabier (born 1 March 1985) is a rugby union player and represents France. She was in the squad in the 2010 Women's Rugby World Cup and was named in the 2014 Women's Rugby World Cup.
