= Manon André =

French rugby union player

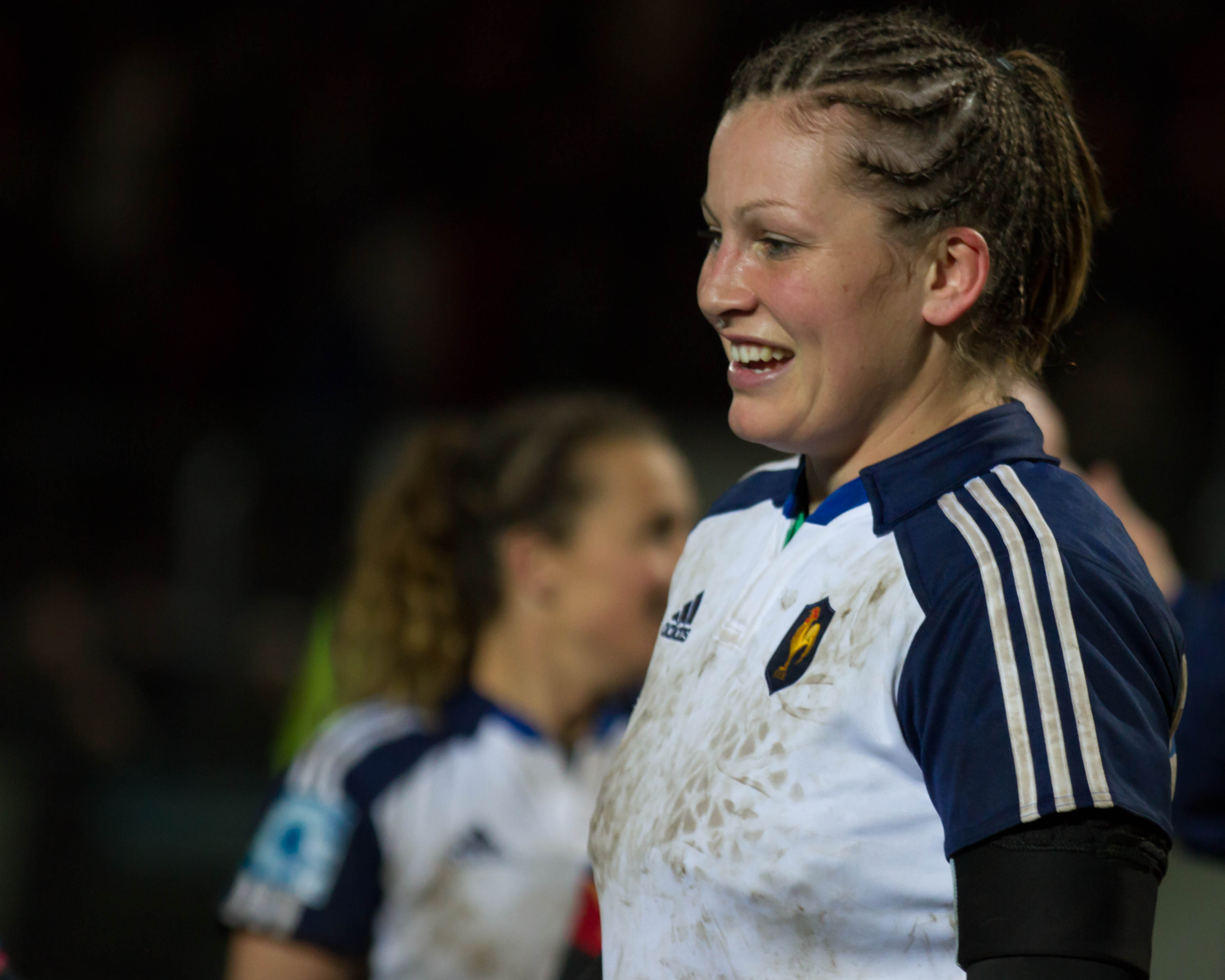
- Manon André at the 2014 Six Nations against Italy.
- Born: 22 September 1986 (age 40)
- Height: 1.8 m (5 ft 11 in)
- Weight: 84 kg (185 lb; 13 st 3 lb)

Rugby union career
- Position: Loose forward
International career
Years	Team	Apps	(Points)
- France

Manon André (born 22 September 1986) is a French rugby union player. She represented France at the 2010 Women's Rugby World Cup and was named in the squad to the 2014 Women's Rugby World Cup.
