= Kathleen Wilton =

- Born: November 10, 1984 (age 42) Palmerston North, New Zealand
- Height: 1.7 m (5 ft 7 in)

Rugby union career
- Position: Prop
Provincial / State sides
Years	Team	Apps	(Points)
2007–2012	Otago		
International career
Years	Team	Apps	(Points)
2007–2014	New Zealand	17	(0)

Kathleen Wilton (born 10 November 1984) is a former rugby union player. She made her Black Ferns debut on 16 October 2007 against Australia. She was selected for the New Zealand squad to the 2014 Women's Rugby World Cup. They lost to Ireland in the pool games, which meant that they did not qualify for the semifinals. She came off the bench in their fifth place final victory over the United States.

== Career ==
In 2008, she had back surgery and missed the rest of the Air New Zealand Cup season. She toured England with the Black Ferns in a three test series in 2012; England eventually won the series. Wilton played in three test matches against a touring England team in 2013. She also featured in the Women's Rugby Series against Australia in 2014.
