= Christian Galonnier =

French rugby union coach

- Born: 6 May 1958 (age 68)

Rugby union career
- Position: -
Coaching career
- Years: Team
- 2010-Present: France
- ?-2005: Czech Republic

Christian Galonnier (born 6 May 1958) is a French rugby union coach. He coached France at the 2010 Women's Rugby World Cup. He coached the French women to victory in their 2014 Women's Six Nations Championship.

He stepped down as coach of the Czech Republic in 2005.
