= Assa Koïta =

French rugby union player

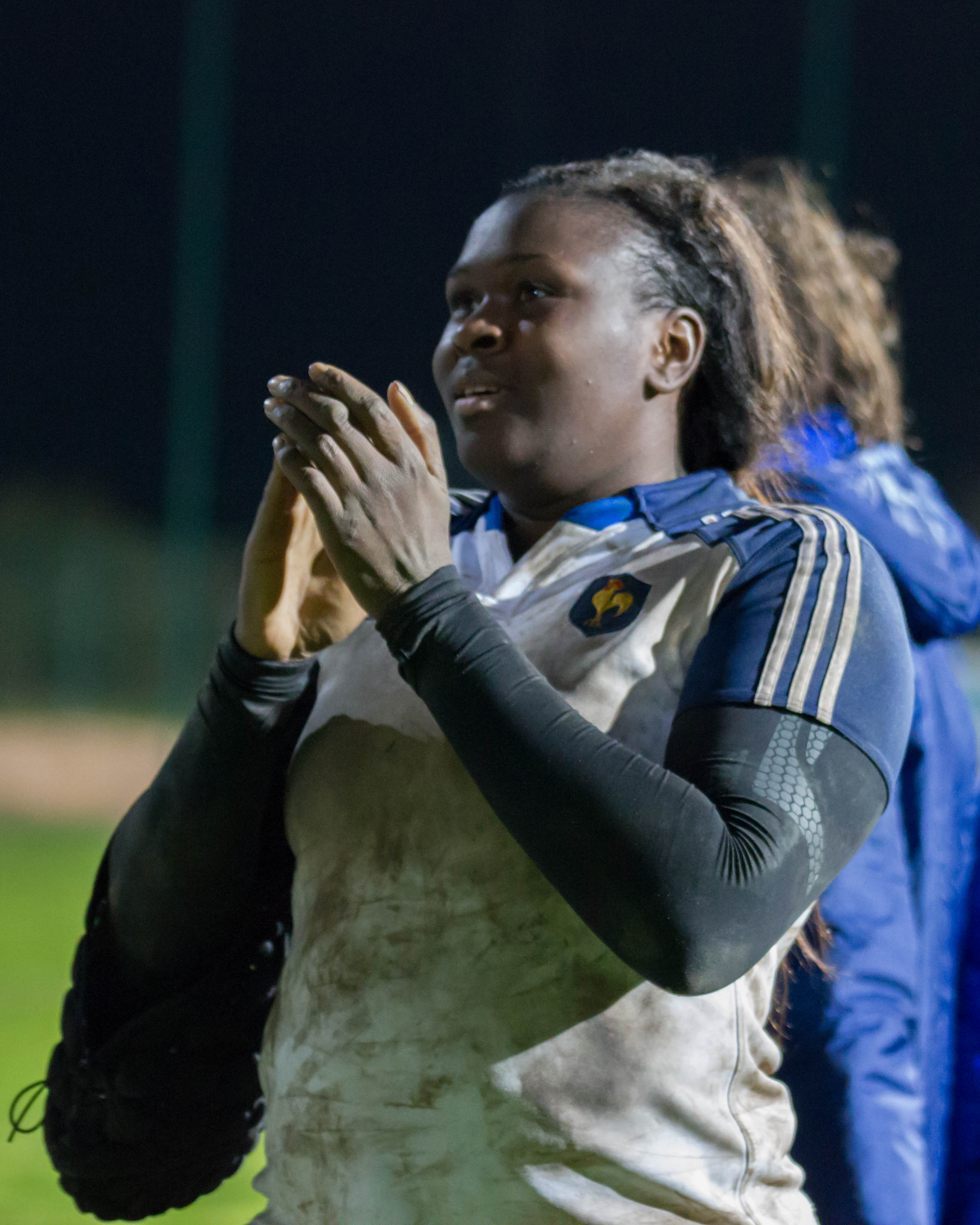
- Born: 28 June 1991 (age 35)
- Height: 1.82 m (5 ft 11 1/2 in)
- Weight: 100 kg (220 lb; 15 st 10 lb)

Rugby union career
- Position: Lock
Senior career
Years	Team	Apps	(Points)
- Bobigny
International career
Years	Team	Apps	(Points)
- France

Assa Koïta (born 28 June 1991 in Vitry-sur-Seine) is a retired French female rugby union player. She played Lock for France and AC Bobigny 93 women's. She played at the 2014 Women's Rugby World Cup and was named to the tournament Dream Team. Koita was a member of the squad that won their fourth Six Nations title in 2014. She announced here retirement in August 2020.

In January 2021, the former international suggested a likely link between her non-selection for the French national team from 2015 and the fact that she chose to wear the veil.
