= Mel Denham =

American rugby union player, and coach

Melanie Denham
- Born: January 24, 1981 (age 45)
- Height: 5 ft 5 in (1.65 m)
- Weight: 162 lb (73 kg; 11.6 st)

Rugby union career
- Position: Flanker
Amateur team(s)
Years	Team	Apps	(Points)
- Beantown
International career
Years	Team	Apps	(Points)
2008–	USA	14	

Mel Denham (born January 24, 1981) is an American rugby union player, and coach.

She played for the United States women's national rugby union team, at the Flanker position. She participated at the 2010 Women's Rugby World Cup. She graduated from Bridgewater State University. She coached at Central Washington University, and Harvard University.
