= Coumba Tombe Diallo =

French rugby union player

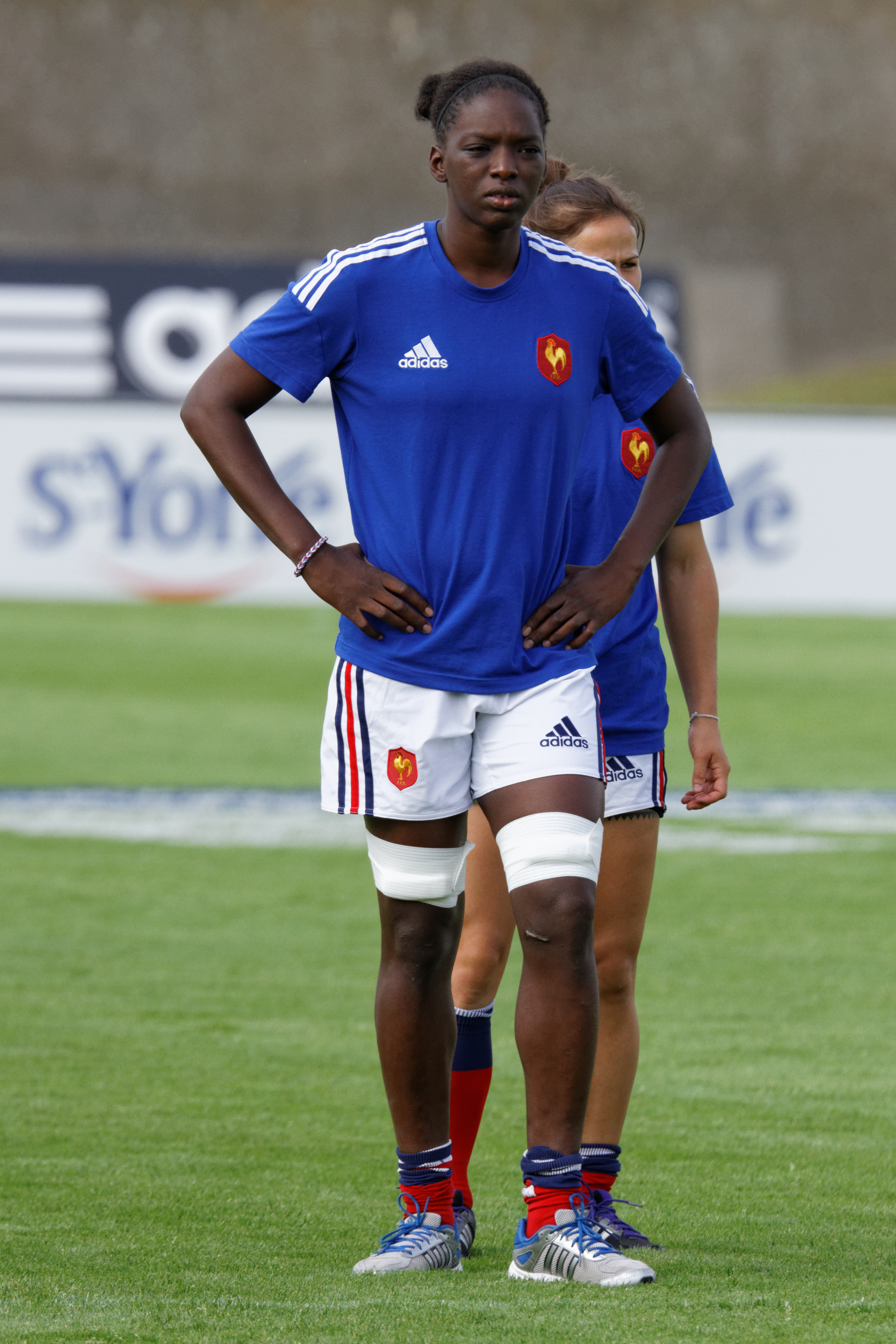
- Diallo during 2014 Women's Rugby World Cup
- Born: 27 September 1990 (age 36)
- Height: 1.8 m (5 ft 11 in)
- Weight: 77 kg (170 lb; 12 st 2 lb)

Rugby union career
- Position: Loose forward
Senior career
Years	Team	Apps	(Points)
- Bobigny
International career
Years	Team	Apps	(Points)
	France	21	

Coumba Tombe Diallo (born 27 September 1990) is a retired French female rugby union player. She represented France at the 2014 Women's Rugby World Cup and was part of the squad that won their fourth Six Nations title in 2014.

She called time on her international career at the end of May 2022, retiring after being capped 50 times for France.
