= Ceri Large =

England international rugby union player

- Born: 11 November 1990 (age 36) Gloucestershire, England
- Weight: 74 kg (163 lb)

Rugby union career
- Position: Flyhalf
Amateur team(s)
Years	Team	Apps	(Points)
–	Drybrook		
Senior career
Years	Team	Apps	(Points)
2010–????	Worcester Valkyries		
????–	Gloucester-Hartpury		
International career
Years	Team	Apps	(Points)
2011–2016	England	52	(57)
Medal record
Representing England
Women's rugby union
Rugby World Cup
Gold medal – first place	2014 France	Team competition

Ceri Ann Large (born 11 November 1990) is an English rugby union player. She made her international debut in 2011 against France. She represented England at the 2014 Women's Rugby World Cup. Large played in every pool game because of her impressive performance, but was replaced in the semi-finals by team captain Katy McLean.
