= Aroha Savage =

NZ international rugby union player

- Born: 11 March 1990 (age 36)
- Height: 1.78 m (5 ft 10 in)
- Weight: 87 kg (192 lb)

Rugby union career
- Position: Loose forward
Provincial / State sides
Years	Team	Apps	(Points)
2007–2012	Auckland	15	(50)
2013–2018	Counties Manukau	29	(59)
2020–2023	Northland	13	(20)
Super Rugby
Years	Team	Apps	(Points)
2022	Blues Women	1	(0)
2023	Hurricanes Poua	3	(0)
International career
Years	Team	Apps	(Points)
2010–2018	New Zealand	33	(20)
Medal record
Women's rugby union
Representing New Zealand
Women's Rugby World Cup
Gold medal – first place	2010 England	Team competition
Gold medal – first place	2017 Ireland	Team competition

Aroha Savage (born 11 March 1990) is a rugby union player. She plays for New Zealand and Auckland. She previously played for the Blues Women in the Super Rugby Aupiki competition. She has competed for the Black Ferns at three Rugby World Cup's — 2010, 2014 and 2017.

== Rugby career ==
=== Provincial ===
Savage debuted for the Auckland Storm in 2007 as a 17-year-old. She helped the Storm to several provincial titles, she then moved to Counties Manukau in 2013 and helped them win the 2016 Farah Palmer Cup title. She later moved to Northland in 2020.

=== International ===
Savage was a member of the 2010 Rugby World Cup winning squad. On 24 August 2010, she made her test debut for the Black Ferns aged 20 against the Wallaroos at the Rugby World Cup.

Savage was in the Black Ferns squad for the 2013 International Series against England.

Savage was named in the squad to the 2014 Women's Rugby World Cup in France. She was also included in the 2017 Women's Rugby World Cup squad.

On 3 November 2021, She was named as captain of the Blues squad for the inaugural Super Rugby Aupiki competition. She started in the Blues 0–35 thrashing by the Chiefs Manawa in the final round.

In 2022, She signed with Hurricanes Poua for the 2023 Super Rugby Aupiki season.
