= Sarah Chobot =

US international rugby union player & coach

- Born: December 19, 1980 (age 45)

Rugby union career
- Position: Prop
International career
Years	Team	Apps	(Points)
	United States	25	(0)
Coaching career
- Years: Team
- 2025–: Denver Onyx (Head Coach)
- 2024: U.S. Women's (Assistant Coach)
- 2023–2024: American Raptors (Head Coach)

Sarah Chobot (born December 19, 1980) is an American rugby union coach and former player. She represented the United States at the 2014 Women's Rugby World Cup.

== Early career ==
Chobot, a Michigan native, played basketball and softball, and also ran track at Mendon High School. She received a heptathlon scholarship for the University of Central Michigan.

== Rugby career ==
=== Playing career ===
She played club rugby for the Minnesota Valkyries, and Glendale Raptors, who since 2017 have been called the Merlins. She first represented the United States women's U-23 national team and then went on four tours with the United States women's national sevens team.

She also represented the United States at the 2014 Women's Rugby World Cup in France.

=== Coaching career ===
She coached the American Raptors, the sole North American team that competed in Super Rugby Americas, from 2023 to 2024. She also started serving as Assistant Coach for the Eagles women in 2024.

In October 2024, Chobot was appointed to be the first head coach of the Denver Onyx, who will compete in the inaugural season of the Women's Elite Rugby competition.
