= Elodie Portaries =

French rugby union player

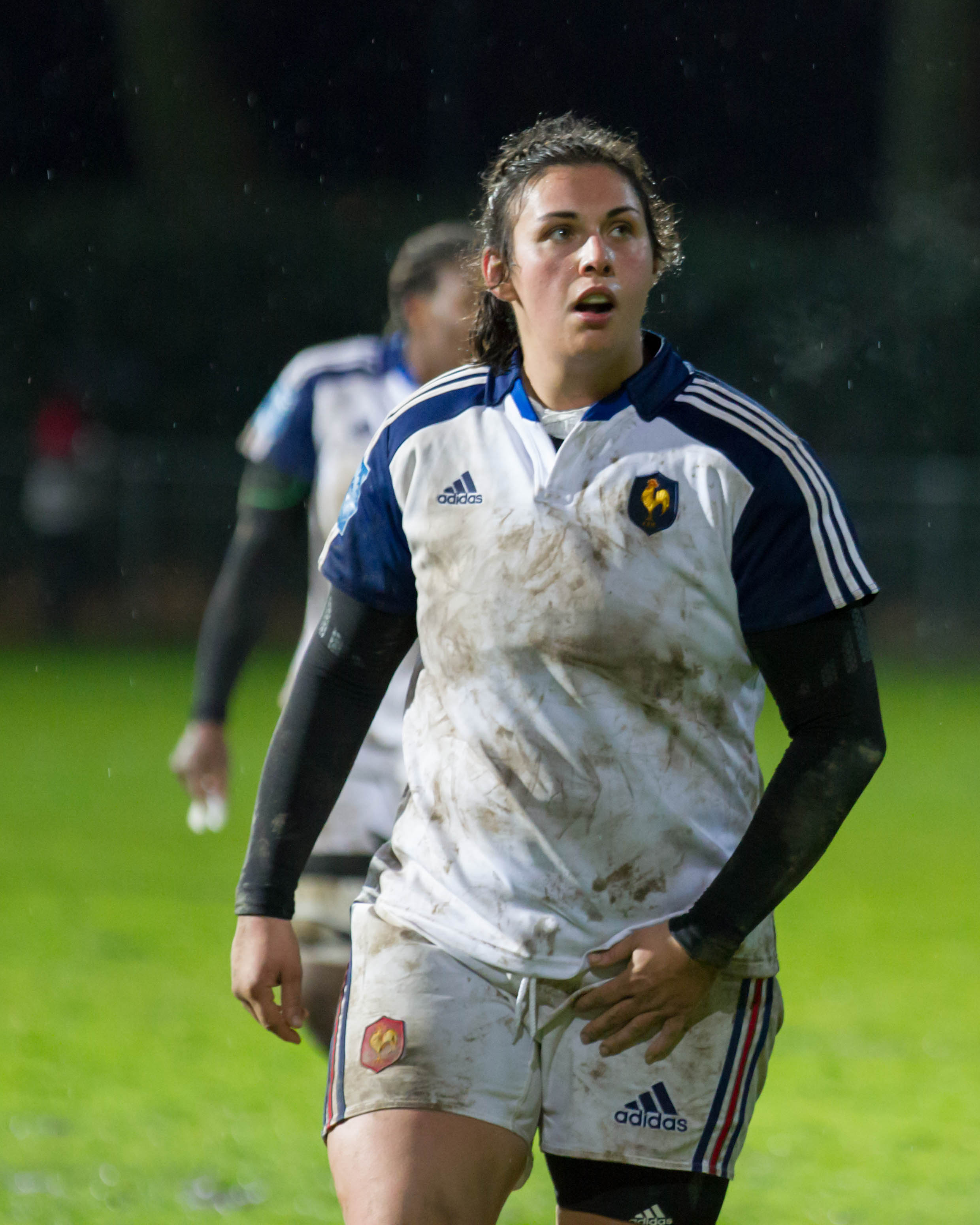
- Portaries at the 2014 Six Nations
- Born: 9 December 1989 (age 36)
- Height: 1.74 m (5 ft 8 1/2 in)
- Weight: 107 kg (236 lb; 16 st 12 lb)

Rugby union career
- Position: Prop
Senior career
Years	Team	Apps	(Points)
- Montpellier
International career
Years	Team	Apps	(Points)
2011-Present	France	25	

Elodie Portaries (born 9 December 1989) is a French rugby union player. She represented France at the 2014 Women's Rugby World Cup. She was a member of the squad that won the Six Nations title in 2014, the fourth time France won the competition.
