= Stacey Bridges =

American rugby union player

- Born: April 23, 1988 (age 38) Waco, Texas, U.S.
- Height: 5 ft 11 in (1.80 m)
- Weight: 178 lb (81 kg; 12 st 10 lb)
- Occupation(s): Assistant Coach Dartmouth Women's Rugby; Professional rugby union player

Rugby union career
- Position: Lock
Amateur team(s)
Years	Team	Apps	(Points)
- Texas A&M
International career
Years	Team	Apps	(Points)
2009-	United States	40	
- USA U-20

Stacey Bridges (born April 23, 1988 in Waco, Texas) is a rugby union player from the United States. She made her debut for the United States on 10 August 2009. She represented the Eagles at the 2010 and 2017 Women's Rugby World Cup's; she was a first alternate during the 2014 Women's Rugby World Cup, training and traveling with the team. She played for 2 years with the USA U-20's. In her senior year of high school she was also an alternate for regionals in powerlifting.

Stacey Bridges was voted 2020 Women's XV Player of the Decade. Stacey Bridges has earned 40 caps, marking the second-most caps earned by a USA Women's Eagle, behind US Rugby Hall of Fame Inductee, Jamie Burke, who has 42. Stacey Bridges played 39 of the 40 international games as an 80-minute lock, likely earning Bridges' the record for most minutes played at the international level by a US Eagle. Bridges is known as an expert in set pieces with special skill maintaining go forward in early phases, as highlighted in the USA Eagles v. Barbarians game in 2019, after which FloRugby dubbed Stacey Bridges the "offload master" and one of the best locks in the world.

As a freshman at Texas A&M, Bridges originally sought out to join the power lifting team. While at an open house she asked some of the rugby girls where the power lifting table was and they were able to convince her to give rugby a try. "I haven't looked back yet," Bridges claims. She credits her college coach Will Riddle and her U-20 coaches Bryn Chivers and Lance Connolly for shaping her into the national team player that she is today. She graduated with a master's degree in Kinesiology from Texas A&M University.

She made her debut for the USA Eagles in August 2009 against England. She is the assistant coach for Dartmouth Women's Rugby.
