= Claire Richardson =

- Born: 2 April 1984 (age 42) Wairoa
- Height: 1.72 m (5 ft 8 in)
- Weight: 79 kg (174 lb)

Rugby union career
- Position: Fullback
Provincial / State sides
Years	Team	Apps	(Points)
2007–2014	Otago	28	(67)
2008–2009	Hawke's Bay	9	(5)
2013	Auckland	8	(29)
International career
Years	Team	Apps	(Points)
2003–2014	New Zealand	24	(54)
Medal record
Women's rugby union
Representing New Zealand
Rugby World Cup
Gold medal – first place	2006 Canada	Team competition

Claire Richardson (born 2 April 1984) is a former rugby union player. She represented New Zealand internationally and provincially for Otago and Hawke's Bay. She was in the squad that won the 2006 Rugby World Cup.

Richardson made her international debut for the Black Ferns on 4 October 2003 against a World XV's team at Auckland. She made her last appearance for the Black Ferns on 17 August 2014 against the United States at the World Cup in Paris.

Richardson scored a hat-trick against hosts, Canada, at the 2006 Rugby World Cup when the Black Ferns ran in ten tries in their 66–7 victory.
