= Audrey Parra =

French rugby union player

- Born: 16 November 1987 (age 38)
- Height: 1.78 m (5 ft 10 in)
- Weight: 76 kg (168 lb)

Rugby union career
- Position: Flyhalf
Senior career
Years	Team	Apps	(Points)
- Montpellier
International career
Years	Team	Apps	(Points)
- France
National sevens team
Years	Team		Comps
- France

Audrey Parra (born 16 November 1987) is a French rugby union player. She represented France at the 2010 Women's Rugby World Cup.
