= Jackie Patea-Fereti =

- Born: September 30, 1986 (age 40) Lower Hutt, New Zealand
- Height: 1.78 m (5 ft 10 in)

Rugby union career
- Position: Lock
Provincial / State sides
Years	Team	Apps	(Points)
2013–Present	Wellington	64	(110)
Super Rugby
Years	Team	Apps	(Points)
2022–Present	Hurricanes Poua	12	(0)
International career
Years	Team	Apps	(Points)
2012–2019	New Zealand	18	(0)

Jackie Patea-Fereti (born 30 September 1986) is a New Zealand rugby union player from the Petone Rugby Club. She played 18 tests for the Black Ferns between 2012 and 2019. She was a member of the 2014 Rugby World Cup squad in France. She also plays for Hurricanes Poua in the Super Rugby Aupiki competition and represents Wellington provincially.

== Rugby career ==
=== 2012–14 ===
Patea-Fereti made her Black Ferns test debut against England on 23 November 2012. She was selected in the New Zealand squad for the 2014 Women's Rugby World Cup.

=== 2018–22 ===
Patea-Fereti was recalled into the Black Ferns squad in 2018 and featured in their two test matches against Australia. In November, she also played in two test matches against France.

Patea-Fereti signed with the Hurricanes for the inaugural Super Rugby Aupiki season in 2022.

=== 2023 ===
Patea-Fereti was named 2023 Hurricanes Poua captain for the second season.
