= Gary Street =

English rugby union player

Gary Street MBE
- Born: 14 November 1967 (age 58) Birmingham, West Midlands, England

Rugby union career
- Position: Scrumhalf
Amateur team(s)
Years	Team	Apps	(Points)
1986-2004	Aston Old Edwardians		
Coaching career
- Years: Team
- 2007-2015: England Women

Gary Street MBE is an English rugby union coach. He coached the England women's national team from 2007, and left his role after England won the Women's Rugby World Cup in 2014.

== Career ==
=== Playing career ===
Street played as a scrum-half for Aston Old Edwardians, Greater Birmingham (over a 20-year period) and North Midlands.

=== Coaching career ===
Street, alongside Nigel Redman, were the pilot coaches for the RFU Academy programme designed by David Shaw in 2000. 8 of the 15 players became full internationals and 5 became World Cup Winners 14 years later. He was an assistant coach to Geoff Richards in 2006. winning his first Six Nations Grand Slam, before taking over as head coach a year later. He coached them to the final of the 2010 Women's Rugby World Cup losing to the Black Ferns in the final.

Under his tutelage they won five Six Nations's in a row, 4 Nations Cup and 4 European Cups. England Women won the 2014 women's World Cup 21-9 against Canada. The assistant coaches were Graham Smith and Simon Middleton. He is currently the most successful English rugby coach in history. Gary was UK overall and High Performance coach of the year 2014. He was awarded Pride of Sport coach of the year and nominated in BBC SPOTY coach of the year. England women's team were awarded Team of the Year. The squad and staff were given Freedom of the Borough of Rugby.

He was Head Coach at Oxford University Women's rugby team with their first ever Twickenham varsity in December 2015 and is now also working for Harlequins RFC . In December 2016, Oxford beat Cambridge 3-0 in the Varsity game at Twickenham and became a Head Coach winner in both Dark Blue and Light Blue, having led Cambridge to victory in 2001.

In 2016/2017, Gary became joint Head Coach with Karen Findlay for Aylesford Bulls Ladies. In their first season they completed the Premiership and Cup double. For the season 2017/2018 they are playing under the Harlequins banner in the inaugural Tyrrells Women's Premier 15s.

Incorporated into his role is Academy Coach Development Officer for Harlequins working with coaches in the developing player programme.
