= Sharon Blaney =

American rugby union player

- Born: May 16, 1979 (age 47) Braintree, Massachusetts, U.S.
- Height: 5 ft 10 in (1.78 m)
- Weight: 190 lb (86 kg; 13 st 8 lb)

Rugby union career
- Position: Lock
Amateur team(s)
Years	Team	Apps	(Points)
	Beantown RFC		(0)
	Oregon Sports Union		(0)
International career
Years	Team	Apps	(Points)
2009-Present	USA	100	(0)

Sharon Blaney (born May 16, 1979 in Braintree, Massachusetts) is an American rugby union player. In 2008 Sharon played with the NRU when they won the NASC. She made her USA Eagles debut against Canada in 2009. She played at the 2010 Women's Rugby World Cup. Blaney was named in the squad to the 2014 Women's Rugby World Cup in France.

Sharon grew up playing soccer and softball, and won numerous awards as a track star in high school.
