= Michaela Staniford =

England international rugby union player

- Born: 11 January 1987 (age 39) High Wycombe, Buckinghamshire
- Height: 1.74 m (5 ft 8 1/2 in)
- Weight: 72 kg (159 lb; 11 st 5 lb)

Rugby union career
- Position: Wing
Senior career
Years	Team	Apps	(Points)
- Henley, Wasps
International career
Years	Team	Apps	(Points)
2005	England	60	
National sevens team
Years	Team		Comps
2009	England		
Medal record
Representing England
Women's rugby union
Rugby World Cup
Silver medal – second place	2010 England	Team competition
Silver medal – second place	2006 Canada	Team competition

Michaela Jane Staniford (born 11 January 1987) is an English female rugby union player. She represented England at the 2006 and 2010 Women's Rugby World Cup. She captained England to the 2013 Rugby World Cup Sevens and was also a key member in the first sevens World Cup in 2009 in Dubai.

Staniford was awarded the IRB Women’s Player of the Year in 2012. She has been married to Emilie Bydwell since 2015.
