= Casey Robertson =

New Zealand rugby union player (born 1981)

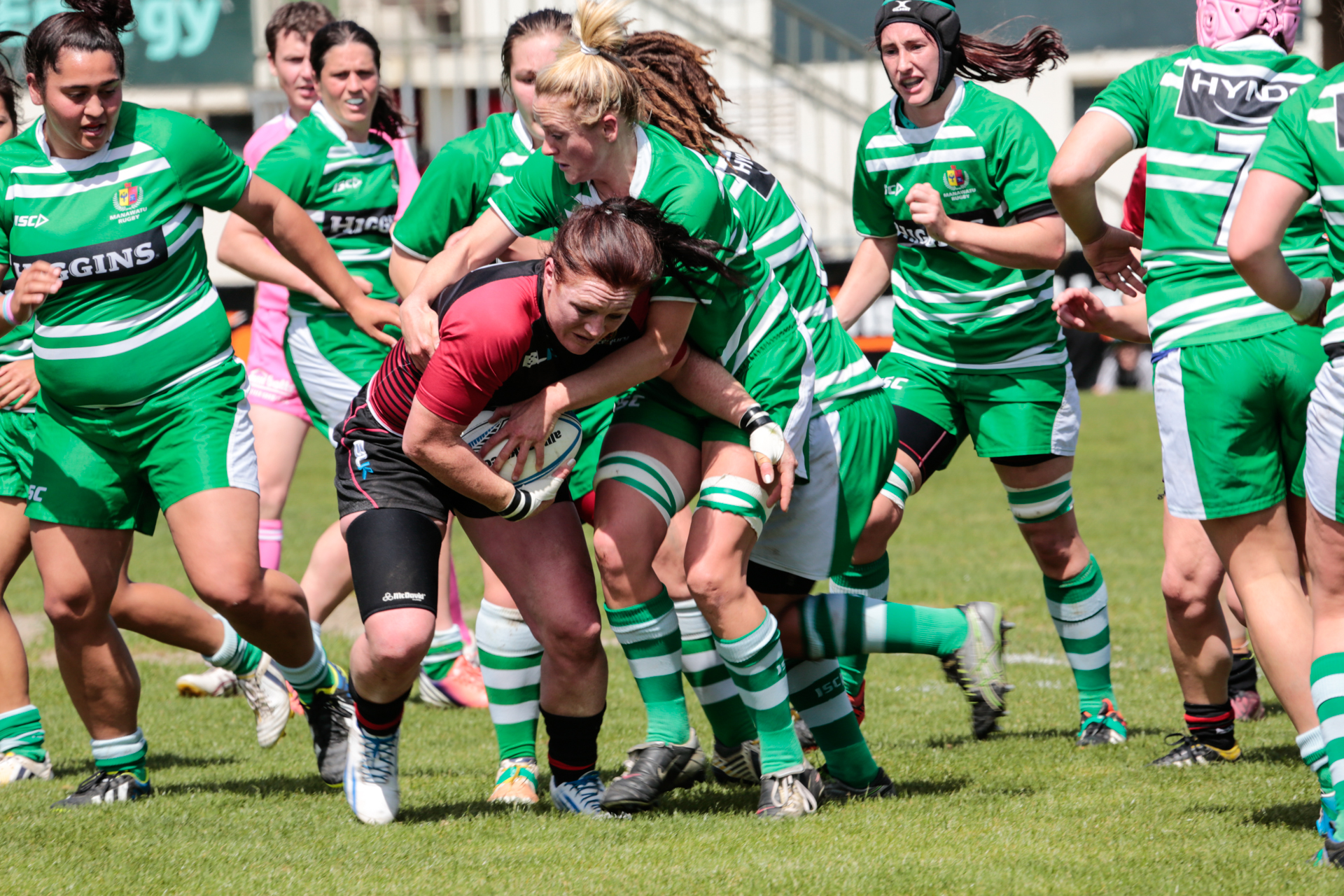
- Robertson (with the ball) playing for Canterbury in 2013.
- Born: 24 February 1981 (age 45)
- Height: 1.74 m (5 ft 9 in)
- Weight: 90 kg (198 lb)

Rugby union career
- Position: Number Eight
Provincial / State sides
Years	Team	Apps	(Points)
1999–2013	Canterbury	32	(60)
1998	Southland		
International career
Years	Team	Apps	(Points)
2002–2014	New Zealand	38	(10)
Medal record
Women's rugby union
Representing New Zealand
Rugby World Cup
Gold medal – first place	2002 Spain	Team competition
Gold medal – first place	2006 Canada	Team competition
Gold medal – first place	2010 England	Team competition

Casey Caldwell (née Robertson; born 24 February 1981) is a former rugby union player for New Zealand. She represented Canterbury and Southland at provincial level.

== Rugby career ==
Robertson played prop before switching to number eight, in 38 tests for the Black Ferns, she had played 16 at prop and 22 as a loose forward.

She made her international debut on 13 May 2002 against Germany at Barcelona.

Robertson was part of the New Zealand sides that won the 2002, 2006, and 2010 Rugby World Cup's.

In July 2013, she was part of the series tour to England. In 2014, she appeared in her fourth World Cup where the Black Ferns finished in their lowest placing of fifth.
