= Naima Reddick =

American rugby union player

- Born: May 26, 1984 (age 42)
- Education: Piedmont High School
- Alma mater: California State University, Chico
- Height: 5 ft 5 in (165 cm)
- Weight: 185 lb (84 kg)

Rugby union career
- Position: Prop
International career
Years	Team	Apps	(Points)
2010-present	United States	13	(-)

Naima Reddick (born May 26, 1984) is an American rugby union player. She debuted for the United States in 2010 against Canada. She was selected for the squad to the 2017 Women's Rugby World Cup in Ireland.

== Early career ==
Reddick started playing rugby at Piedmont High School. She then played for Chico State University for five years. She has played for the Berkeley All Blues, NorCal Triple Threat, Northern United in Porirua, New Zealand and also for the Wellington Pride provincial side, San Francisco Golden Gate RFC and currently for the Seattle Saracens.

She represented the Eagles Under 19 team in 2003 and the Under 23s from 2006 to 2007. She went to the 2010 and 2014 Women's Rugby World Cups.
