= 2014 Women's Six Nations Championship =

Women's rugby union competition

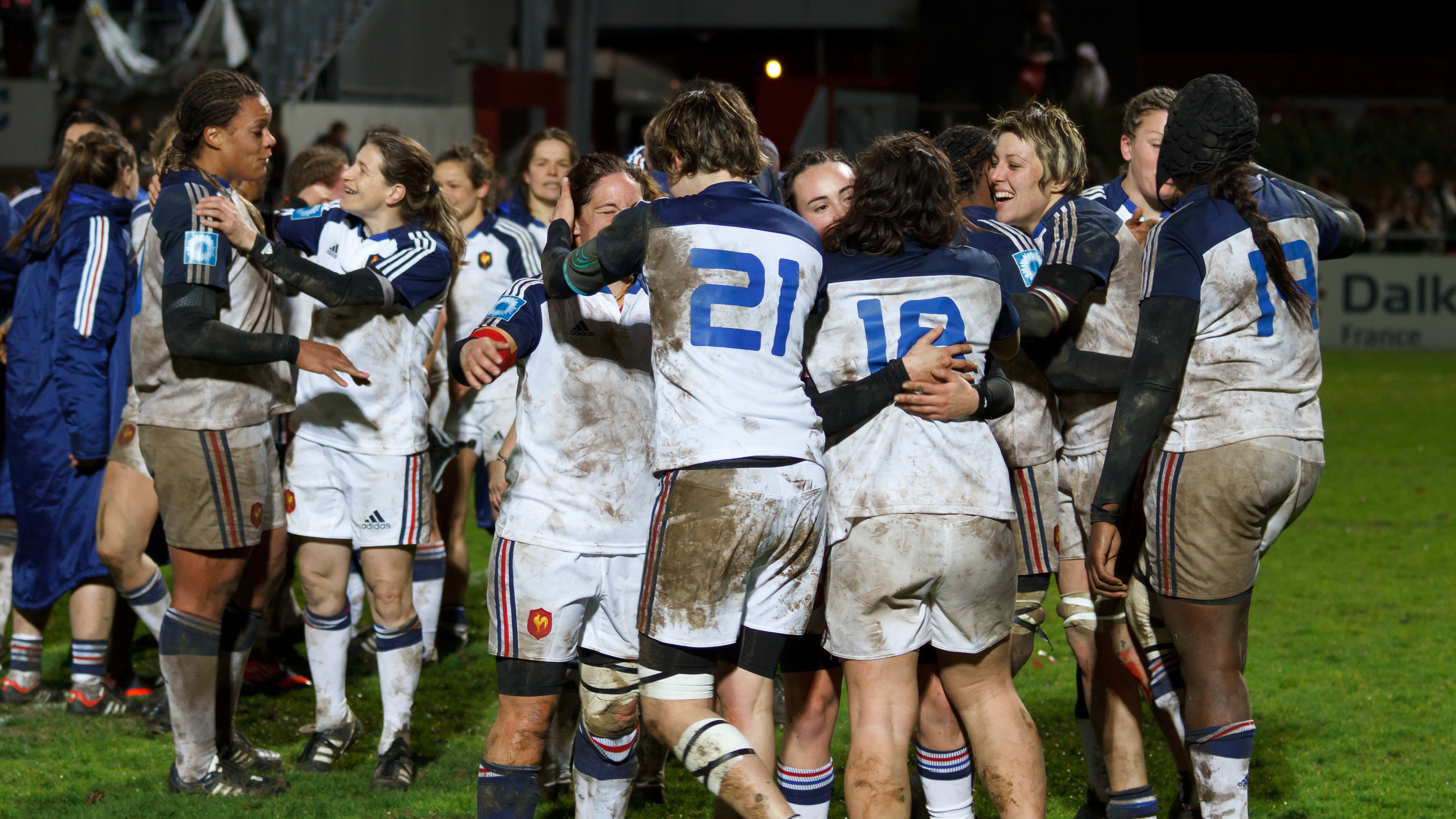
- 2014 W6N - France vs Ita
- Date: February 2014 – March 2014
- Countries: England; France; Ireland; Italy; Scotland; Wales

Tournament statistics
- Champions: France (4th title)
- Grand Slam: France (4th title)
- Triple Crown: England (16th title)
- Matches played: 15
- Tries scored: 82 (5.47 per match)
- Top point scorer: (England) Emily Scarratt (34)
- Top try scorers: (England) Emily Scarratt (4) (France) Marion Lièvre (4)
- Official website: Official website

The 2014 Women's Six Nations Championship, also known as the 2014 RBS Women's Six Nations due to the tournament's sponsorship by the Royal Bank of Scotland, was the 13th series of the Women's Six Nations Championship, an annual women's rugby union competition between six European rugby union national teams. Matches were held in February and March 2014, on the same weekends as the men's tournament, if not always the same day.

The championship was contested by England, France, Ireland, Italy, Scotland and Wales.

== Table ==
Position	Nation	Games				Points				Table points
Position	Nation	Played	Won	Drawn	Lost	For	Against	Difference	Tries	Table points
1	France	5	5	0	0	162	21	+141	25	10
2	England	5	4	0	1	145	31	+114	23	8
3	Ireland	5	3	0	2	137	42	+95	20	6
4	Italy	5	2	0	3	57	108	–51	8	4
5	Wales	5	1	0	4	45	88	–43	5	2
6	Scotland	5	0	0	5	5	261	–256	1	0

== Fixtures and results ==
=== Week 1 ===
31 January 2014

Ireland	59 – 0	Scotland
Tries: Sophie Spence 3', 34', 42'; Alison Miller 9', 23'; Heather O'Brien 20'; Lynne Cantwell 30', 64'; Ailis Egan 52'; Stacey-Lea Kennedy 60'; Claire Molloy 80'; Cons: Nora Stapleton 9'; Jenny Murphy 60'

Archerstown Road, Ashbourne, Leinster
Referee: Claire Hodnett (England)

IRELAND:
FB	15	Jackie Shiels	(substituted off) 64'
RW	14	Hannah Casey
OC	13	Lynne Cantwell
IC	12	Jenny Murphy	(substituted off) 65'
LW	11	Alison Miller
FH	10	Nora Stapleton
SH	9	Amy Davis	(substituted off) 62'
N8	8	Heather O'Brien
OF	7	Claire Molloy
BF	6	Siobhan Fleming	(substituted off) 59'
RL	5	Marie Louise Reilly	(substituted off) 56'
LL	4	Sophie Spence
TP	3	Ailis Egan	(substituted off) 52'
HK	2	Stacey-Lea Kennedy	(substituted off) 59'
LP	1	Fiona Coghlan (C)	(substituted off) 65'
Replacements:
HK	16	Gillian Bourke	(substituted on) 59'
PR	17	Fiona Hayes	(substituted on) 52'
PR	18	Kerrie-Ann Craddock	(substituted on) 65'
LK	19	Orla Fitzsimmons	(substituted on) 56'
FL	20	Paula Fitzpatrick	(substituted on) 59'
SH	21	Larissa Muldoon	(substituted on) 62'
CE	22	Grace Davitt	(substituted on) 65'
FB	23	Niamh Briggs	(substituted on) 64'
Coach:
(Republic of Ireland) Philip Doyle

SCOTLAND:
FB	15	Stephanie Johnston
RW	14	Katy Green	(substituted off) 48'
OC	13	Annabel Sergeant
IC	12	Gillian Inglis
LW	11	Megan Gaffney
FH	10	Lisa Martin	(substituted off) 62'
SH	9	Sarah Law	(substituted off) 41'
N8	8	Lindsay Wheeler
OF	7	Ruth Slaven	(substituted off) 66'
BF	6	Tess Forsberg
RL	5	Deborah McCormack
LL	4	Jade Konkel	(substituted off) 53'
TP	3	Lindsey Smith	(substituted off) 41'
HK	2	Sarah Quick	(substituted off) 41'
LP	1	Tracy Balmer (C)	(substituted off) 64'
Replacements:
HK	16	Nikki McLeod	(substituted on) 41'
PR	17	Lisa Robertson	(substituted on) 64'
PR	18	Heather Lockhart	(substituted on) 41'
LK	19	Emma Wassel	(substituted on) 53'
FL	20	Anna Stodter	(substituted on) 66'
SH	21	Louise Dalgliesh	(substituted on) 41'
FH	22	Tanya Griffiths	(substituted on) 62'
WG	23	Laura Steven	(substituted on) 48'
Coach:
(Scotland) Jules Maxton

Assistant referees:
Ken Henley-Willis (Ireland)
Susan Carty (Ireland)
Assessor:
Michel Lamoulie (France)

1 February 2014

France	18 – 6	England
Tries: Gaëlle Mignot 44', 64'; Con: Jessy Trémoulière 64'; Pen: Sandrine Agricole 33'; Drop: Sandrine Agricole 10'		Pens: Katy McLean 12', 29'

Stade des Alpes, Grenoble, Isère
Referee: Helen O'Reilly (Ireland)

FRANCE:
FB	15	Jessy Trémoulière	(substituted off) 69'
RW	14	Marion Lièvre
OC	13	Shannon Izar
IC	12	Marjorie Mayans	(substituted off) 71'
LW	11	Camille Grassineau
FH	10	Sandrine Agricole
SH	9	Jennyfer Troncy	(substituted off) 73'
N8	8	Safi N'Diaye
OF	7	Coumba Diallo
BF	6	Koumiba Djossouvi
RL	5	Assa Koïta
LL	4	Marine De Nadaï	(substituted off) 60'
TP	3	Elodie Portaries	(substituted off) 65'
HK	2	Gaëlle Mignot (C)	(substituted off) 73'
LP	1	Hélène Ezanno	(substituted off) 71'
Replacements:
HK	16	Laëtitia Salles	(substituted on) 73'
PR	17	Julie Duval	(substituted on) 65'
PR	18	Lise Arricastre	(substituted on) 71'
LK	19	Sandra Rabier	(substituted on) 60'
FL	20	Laëtitia Grand
CE	21	Élodie Poublan	(substituted on) 71'
FB	22	Christelle Le Duff	(substituted on) 69'
SH	23	Yanna Rivoalen	(substituted on) 73'
Coach:
(France) Christian Galonnier

ENGLAND:
FB	15	Kay Wilson
RW	14	Katherine Merchant	(substituted off) 43'
OC	13	Emily Scarratt
IC	12	Rachael Burford
LW	11	Michaela Staniford
FH	10	Katy McLean (C)
SH	9	Natasha Hunt	(substituted off) 60'
N8	8	Sarah Hunter
OF	7	Margaret Alphonsi
BF	6	Marlie Packer	(substituted off) 54'
RL	5	Emily Braund	(substituted off) 60'
LL	4	Tamara Taylor
TP	3	Sophie Hemming	(substituted off) 65'
HK	2	Emma Croker	(substituted off) 54'
LP	1	Rochelle Clark	(substituted off) 65'
Replacements:
HK	16	Victoria Fleetwood	(substituted on) 54'
PR	17	Claire Purdy	(substituted on) 65'
PR	18	Laura Keates	(substituted on) 65'
FL	19	Hannah Gallagher	(substituted on) 54'
LK	20	Rebecca Essex	(substituted on) 60'
SH	21	La Toya Mason	(substituted on) 43'
FH	22	Ceri Large
CE	23	Amber Reed	(substituted on) 60'
Coach:
(England) Gary Street

Assistant referees:
Cédric Jouvenoz (France)
Thomas Chereque (France)
Assessor:
Wayne Erickson (Australia)

2 February 2014

Wales	11 – 12	Italy
Try: Lowri Harries 16'; Pens: Robyn Wilkins 32', 65'		Tries: Melissa Bettoni 61'; Ilaria Arrighetti 76'; Con: Michela Sillari 61'

Talbot Athletic Ground, Port Talbot, West Glamorgan
Referee: Nicky Inwood (New Zealand)

WALES:
FB	15	Dyddgu Hywel	(substituted off) 72'
RW	14	Philippa Tuttiett
OC	13	Elen Evans
IC	12	Robyn Wilkins
LW	11	Laurie Harries	(substituted off) 50'
FH	10	Elinor Snowsill
SH	9	Amy Day
N8	8	Catrina Nicholas
OF	7	Sioned Harries
BF	6	Sian Williams	(substituted off) 45'
RL	5	Nia Davies
LL	4	Jenny Hawkins
TP	3	Catrin Edwards (C)
HK	2	Lowri Harries	(substituted off) 75'
LP	1	Megan York	(substituted off) 45'
Replacements:
HK	16	Carys Phillips	(substituted on) 75'
PR	17	Jenny Davies	(substituted on) 45'
PR	18	Caryl Thomas
LK	19	Delyth Davies
FL	20	Shona Powell Hughes	(substituted on) 45'
SH	21	Sian Moore
CE	22	Rebecca De Filippo	(substituted on) 50'
WG	23	Ffion Bowen	(substituted on) 72'
Coach:
(Wales) Rhys Edwards

ITALY:
FB	15	Manuela Furlan
RW	14	Maria Diletta Veronese
OC	13	Maria Grazia Cioffi
IC	12	Michela Sillari
LW	11	Sofia Stefan
FH	10	Beatrice Rigoni
SH	9	Sara Barattin
N8	8	Silvia Gaudino (C)
OF	7	Ilaria Arrighetti
BF	6	Michela Este
RL	5	Cristina Molic
LL	4	Alice Trevisan
TP	3	Awa Coulibaly
HK	2	Melissa Bettoni
LP	1	Marta Ferrari
Replacements:
HK	16	Debora Ballarini
PR	17	Lucia Cammarano
PR	18	Sara Zanon
LK	19	Alessia Pantarotto
FL	20	Elisa Giordano
	21	n/a
FH	22	Maria Magatti
WG	23	Chiara Buongiorno
Coach:
(Italy) Andrea Di Giandomenico

Assistant referees:
Chris Williams (Wales)
Stuart Kibble (Wales)
Assessor:
n/a

=== Week 2 ===
7 February 2014

Ireland	14 – 6	Wales
Try: Heather O'Brien 62'; Pens: Niamh Briggs 39', 50', 80'		Pens: Robyn Wilkins 17', 25'

Archerstown Road, Ashbourne, Leinster
Referee: Nicky Inwood (New Zealand)

IRELAND:
FB	15	Niamh Briggs
RW	14	Hannah Casey	(substituted off) 69'
OC	13	Lynne Cantwell
IC	12	Jenny Murphy
LW	11	Alison Miller
FH	10	Nora Stapleton
SH	9	Larissa Muldoon
N8	8	Heather O’Brien
OF	7	Claire Molloy
BF	6	Siobhan Fleming
RL	5	Marie-Louise Reilly
LL	4	Sophie Spence
TP	3	Ailis Egan
HK	2	Stacey-Lea Kennedy	(substituted off) 56'
LP	1	Fiona Coghlan (C)
Replacements:
HK	16	Gillian Bourke	(substituted on) 56'
PR	17	Fiona Hayes
PR	18	Kerrie-Ann Craddock
FL	19	Paula Fitzpatrick
SH	20	Amy Davis
WG	21	Ashleigh Baxter	(substituted on) 69'
CE	22	Grace Davitt
FB	23	Jackie Shiels
Coach:
(Republic of Ireland) Philip Doyle

WALES:
FB	15	Dyddgu Hywel
RW	14	Elen Evans
OC	13	Robyn Wilkins
IC	12	Rebecca de Filippo
LW	11	Philippa Tuttiett	(substituted off) 73'
FH	10	Elinor Snowsill
SH	9	Amy Day	(substituted off) 77'
N8	8	Rachel Taylor (C)	(substituted off) 73'
OF	7	Nia Davis
BF	6	Catrina Nicholas	(substituted off) 50'
RL	5	Shona Powell Hughes	(yellow card) 72' to 80+2'
LL	4	Jenny Hawkins
TP	3	Catrin Edwards
HK	2	Lowri Harries	(yellow card) 50' to 50' (substituted off) 77'
LP	1	Megan York	(substituted off) 50'
Replacements:
HK	16	Carys Phillips	(substituted on) 77'
PR	17	Jenny Davies	(substituted on) 50'
PR	18	Caryl Thomas
LK	19	Sian Williams	(substituted on) 73'
FL	20	Sioned Harries	(substituted on) 50'
SH	21	Sian Moore	(substituted on) 77'
WG	22	Laurie Harries	(substituted on) 73'
WG	23	Ffion Bowen
Coach:
(Wales) Rhys Edwards

Assistant referees:
Helen O'Reilly (Ireland)
Aoife McCarthy (Ireland)
Assessor:
n/a

8 February 2014

France	29 – 0	Italy
Tries: Koumiba Djossouvi 23'; Marion Lièvre 51'; Penalty Try 60'; Lise Arricastre 69'; Assa Koïta 75'; Cons: Christelle Le Duff 60'; Jessy Trémoulière 69'

Stade Ernest-Argelès, Blagnac, Haute-Garonne
Referee: Claire Hodnett (England)

FRANCE:
FB	15	Christelle Le Duff	(substituted off) 62'
RW	14	Marion Lièvre
OC	13	Élodie Poublan	(substituted off) 52'
IC	12	Marjorie Mayans
LW	11	Camille Grassineau
FH	10	Sandrine Agricole
SH	9	Jennyfer Troncy	(substituted off) 65'
N8	8	Safi N'Diaye
OF	7	Laëtitia Grand	(substituted off) 65'
BF	6	Koumiba Djossouvi
RL	5	Marine De Nadaï	(substituted off) 46'
LL	4	Sandra Rabier
TP	3	Elodie Portaries	(substituted off) 52'
HK	2	Gaëlle Mignot (C)	(substituted off) 56'
LP	1	Hélène Ezanno	(substituted off) 52'
Replacements:
HK	16	Laëtitia Salles	(substituted on) 56'
PR	17	Julie Duval	(substituted on) 52'
PR	18	Lise Arricastre	(substituted on) 52'
LK	19	Assa Koïta	(substituted on) 46'
FL	20	Manon André	(substituted on) 65'
CE	21	Shannon Izar	(substituted on) 52'
FB	22	Jessy Trémoulière	(substituted on) 62'
SH	23	Yanna Rivoalen	(substituted on) 65'
Coach:
(France) Christian Galonnier

ITALY:
FB	15	Manuela Furlan
RW	14	Maria Diletta Veronese	(substituted off) 71'
OC	13	Maria Grazia Cioffi	(substituted off) 65'
IC	12	Michela Sillari	(substituted off) 56'
LW	11	Sofia Stefan
FH	10	Veronica Schiavon	(substituted off) 69'
SH	9	Sara Barattin
N8	8	Silvia Gaudino (C)
OF	7	Michela Este
BF	6	Ilaria Arrighetti
RL	5	Alessia Pantarotto
LL	4	Alice Trevisan
TP	3	Awa Coulibaly
HK	2	Debora Ballarini	(substituted off) 52'
LP	1	Marta Ferrari
Replacements:
HK	16	Melissa Bettoni	(substituted on) 52'
PR	17	Lucia Cammarano
PR	18	Sara Zanon
	19	n/a
N8	20	Elisa Giordano	(substituted on) 71'
FH	21	Beatrice Rigoni	(substituted on) 56'
CE	22	Maria Magatti	(substituted on) 65'
WG	23	Chiara Buongiorno	(substituted on) 69'
Coach:
(Italy) Andrea Di Giandomenico

Assistant referees:
Maxime Rouquie (France)
Joachim Régis (France)
Assessor:
Carlos Molinari (Argentina)

9 February 2014

Scotland	0 – 63	England
		Tries: Joanna McGilchrist 7'; Amber Reed 15'; Lydia Thompson 24'; Claire Purdy 30'; Sarah Hunter 35'; Katy McLean 49'; Emily Scarratt 55'; Margaret Alphonsi 60'; Claire Allan 65'; Sophie Hemming 70'; Hannah Gallagher 75'; Cons: Katy McLean 30', 35', 49',70'

Rubislaw Playing Fields, Aberdeen
Referee: Christine Bigaran (France)

SCOTLAND:
FB	15	Stephanie Johnston
RW	14	Annabel Sergeant
OC	13	Gillian Inglis
IC	12	Laura Steven
LW	11	Megan Gaffney	(substituted off) 60'
FH	10	Lisa Martin	(substituted off) 60'
SH	9	Louise Dalgliesh	(substituted off) 60'
N8	8	Anna Stodter
OF	7	Tess Forsberg
BF	6	Ruth Slaven
RL	5	Deborah McCormack	(substituted off) 41'
LL	4	Jade Konkel	(substituted off) 41'
TP	3	Tracy Balmer (C)	(substituted off) 60'
HK	2	Sarah Quick	(substituted off) 39'
LP	1	Heather Lockhart	(substituted off) 41'
Replacements:
HK	16	Nikki McLeod	(substituted on) 39'
PR	17	Lindsey Smith	(substituted on) 41'
PR	18	Lisa Robertson	(substituted on) 60'
LK	19	Emma Wassell	(substituted on) 41'
FL	20	Rachael Cook	(substituted on) 41'
SH	21	Sarah Law	(substituted on) 60'
FH	22	Tanya Griffith	(substituted on) 60'
WG	23	Katy Green	(substituted on) 60'
Coach:
(Scotland) Jules Maxton

ENGLAND:
FB	15	Emily Scarratt
RW	14	Lydia Thompson	(substituted off) 41'
OC	13	Amber Reed
IC	12	Rachael Burford	(substituted off) 41'
LW	11	Claire Allan
FH	10	Katy McLean (C)
SH	9	La Toya Mason	(substituted off) 54'
N8	8	Sarah Hunter	(substituted off) 54'
OF	7	Marlie Packer	(substituted off) 54'
BF	6	Hannah Gallagher
RL	5	Joanna McGilchrist
LL	4	Rebecca Essex
TP	3	Laura Keates	(substituted off) 54'
HK	2	Victoria Fleetwood	(substituted off) 41'
LP	1	Claire Purdy	(substituted off) 54'
Replacements:
HK	16	Mercedes Foy	(substituted on) 41'
PR	17	Sophie Hemming	(substituted on) 54'
PR	18	Sasha Acheson	(substituted on) 54'
LK	19	Emily Braund	(substituted on) 54'
FL	20	Margaret Alphonsi	(substituted on) 54'
SH	21	Georgina Gulliver	(substituted on) 54'
FH	22	Ceri Large	(substituted on) 41'
FB	23	Kay Wilson	(substituted on) 41'
Coach:
(England) Gary Street

Assistant referees:
Alex Pratt (Scotland)
Don MacPherson (Scotland)
Assessor:
Wayne Erickson (Australia)

=== Week 3 ===
22 February 2014

England	17 – 10	Ireland
Tries: Sarah Hunter 8'; Kay Wilson 40'; Marlie Packer 60'; Con: Katy McLean 8'		Try: Larissa Muldoon 30'; Con: Niamh Briggs 30'; Pen: Niamh Briggs 24'

Twickenham Stadium, London
Referee: Sherry Trumbull (Canada)

ENGLAND:
FB	15	Emily Scarratt
RW	14	Katherine Merchant
OC	13	Amber Reed
IC	12	Rachael Burford	(substituted off) 71'
LW	11	Kay Wilson	(substituted off) 58'
FH	10	Katy McLean (C)
SH	9	Natasha Hunt	(substituted off) 56'
N8	8	Sarah Hunter
OF	7	Margaret Alphonsi
BF	6	Hannah Gallagher	(substituted off) 46'
RL	5	Joanna McGilchrist	(yellow card) 62' to 72'
LL	4	Rebecca Essex	(substituted off) 51'
TP	3	Sophie Hemming	(substituted off) 58'
HK	2	Emma Croker	(substituted off) 51'
LP	1	Rochelle Clark	(substituted off) 58'
Replacements:
HK	16	Victoria Fleetwood	(substituted on) 51'
PR	17	Laura Keates	(substituted on) 58'
PR	18	Sasha Acheson	(substituted on) 58'
LK	19	Tamara Taylor	(substituted on) 51'
FL	20	Marlie Packer	(substituted on) 46'
SH	21	La Toya Mason	(substituted on) 56'
FH	22	Ceri Large	(substituted on) 71'
WG	23	Lydia Thompson	(substituted on) 58'
Coach:
(England) Gary Street

IRELAND:
FB	15	Niamh Briggs	(substituted off) 51'
RW	14	Ashleigh Baxter	(substituted off) 59'
OC	13	Lynne Cantwell	(yellow card) 72' to 80+2'
IC	12	Jenny Murphy	(substituted off) 52'
LW	11	Alison Miller
FH	10	Nora Stapleton
SH	9	Larissa Muldoon	(substituted off) 75'
N8	8	Heather O'Brien	(yellow card) 79' to 80+9'
OF	7	Claire Molloy
BF	6	Siobhan Fleming
RL	5	Marie Louise Reilly
LL	4	Sophie Spence	(substituted off) 57'
TP	3	Ailis Egan	(substituted off) 74'
HK	2	Gillian Bourke	(substituted off) 60'
LP	1	Fiona Coghlan (C)	(substituted off) 75'
Replacements:
HK	16	Stacey-Lea Kennedy	(substituted on) 60'
PR	17	Fiona Hayes	(substituted on) 74'
PR	18	Kerrie-Ann Craddock	(substituted on) 75'
LK	19	Laura Guest	(substituted on) 57'
SH	20	Amy Davis	(substituted on) 75'
WG	21	Hannah Casey	(substituted on) 59'
CE	22	Grace Davitt	(substituted on) 52'
FB	23	Jackie Shiels	(substituted on) 51'
Coach:
(Republic of Ireland) Philip Doyle

Assistant referees:
Claire Hodnett (England)
Tracey Pettingale (England)
Assessor:
Michel Lamoulie (France)

23 February 2014

Italy	45 – 5	Scotland
Tries: Ilaria Arrighetti 3'; Michela Sillari 10'; Manuela Furlan 21'; Beatrice Rigoni 35', 70'; Sara Barattin 57'; Cons: Veronica Schiavon 3', 10', 21'; Pens: Veronica Schiavon 17', 50', 61'		Try: Annabel Sergeant 79'

Stadio Francesco Casino, Santa Maria Capua Vetere, Caserta
Referee: Christine Bigaran (France)

ITALY:
FB	15	Manuela Furlan
RW	14	Michela Sillari
OC	13	Maria Grazia Cioffi	(substituted off) 71'
IC	12	Beatrice Rigoni	(substituted off) 71'
LW	11	Sofia Stefan	(substituted off) 74'
FH	10	Veronica Schiavon
SH	9	Sara Barattin
N8	8	Silvia Gaudino (C)
OF	7	Cristina Molic
BF	6	Ilaria Arrighetti	(substituted off) 57'
RL	5	Alessia Pantarotto	(substituted off) 56'
LL	4	Alice Trevisan
TP	3	Awa Coulibaly	(substituted off) 74'
HK	2	Melissa Bettoni	(substituted off) 64'
LP	1	Marta Ferrari	(substituted off) 57'
Replacements:
HK	16	Debora Ballarini	(substituted on) 57'
PR	17	Lucia Cammarano	(substituted on) 64'
PR	18	Irene Camapanini	(substituted on) 74'
LK	19	Elisa Giordano	(substituted on) 56'
FL	20	Michela Este	(substituted on) 57'
SH	21	Monica Bruno	(substituted on) 71'
CE	22	Maria Magatti	(substituted on) 71'
WG	23	Chiara Buongiorno	(substituted on) 74'
Coach:
(Italy) Andrea Di Giandomenico

SCOTLAND:
FB	15	Stephanie Johnston
RW	14	Annabel Sergeant
OC	13	Gillian Inglis
IC	12	Laura Steven	(substituted off) 41'
LW	11	Katy Green
FH	10	Lisa Martin	(substituted off) 63'
SH	9	Louise Dalgliesh	(substituted off) 21'
N8	8	Anna Stodter	(substituted off) 54'
OF	7	Tess Forsberg	(substituted off) 54'
BF	6	Ruth Slaven
RL	5	Emma Wassell
LL	4	Deborah McCormack
TP	3	Tracy Balmer (C)	(substituted off) 62'
HK	2	Lindsey Smith	(substituted off) 50'
LP	1	Heather Lockhart	(substituted off) 64'
Replacements:
HK	16	Lana Skeldon	(substituted on) 50'
PR	17	Lisa Robertson	(substituted on) 62'
PR	18	Karen Dunbar	(substituted on) 64'
LK	19	Jade Konkel	(substituted on) 54'
FL	20	Rachael Cook	(substituted on) 54'
SH	21	Sarah Law	(substituted on) 21'
FH	22	Tanya Griffith	(substituted on) 41'
WG	23	Emily Irving	(substituted on) 63'
Coach:
(Scotland) Jules Maxton

Assistant referees:
Maria Beatrice Benvenuti (Italy)
Maria Giovanna Pacifico (Italy)
Assessor:
Kate Todd (United States)

23 February 2014

Wales	0 – 27	France
		Tries: Safi N'Diaye 46'; Sandrine Agricole 62'; Shannon Izar 78'; Marion Lièvre 79'; Cons: Sandrine Agricole 46', 78'; Pen: Sandrine Agricole 35'

Talbot Athletic Ground, Port Talbot, West Glamorgan
Referee: Helen O'Reilly (Ireland)

WALES:
FB	15	Dyddgu Hywel
RW	14	Elen Evans
OC	13	Robyn Wilkins
IC	12	Rebecca de Filippo	(substituted off) 75'
LW	11	Philippa Tuttiett
FH	10	Elinor Snowsill
SH	9	Amy Day	(substituted off) 65'
N8	8	Rachel Taylor (C)
OF	7	Sioned Harries	(substituted off) 65'
BF	6	Catrina Nicholas	(substituted off) 65'
RL	5	Shona Powell Hughes
LL	4	Nia Davies
TP	3	Catrin Edwards	(substituted off) 60'
HK	2	Lowri Harries	(substituted off) 68'
LP	1	Jenny Davies	(substituted off) 51'
Replacements:
HK	16	Carys Phillips	(substituted on) 68'
PR	17	Megan York	(substituted on) 51'
PR	18	Caryl Thomas	(substituted on) 60'
LK	19	Jenny Hawkins	(substituted on) 65'
FL	20	Sian Williams	(substituted on) 65'
SH	21	Sian Moore	(substituted on) 65'
FH	22	Laurie Harries
WG	23	Elli Norkett	(substituted on) 75'
Coach:
(Wales) Rhys Edwards

FRANCE:
FB	15	Christelle Le Duff	(substituted off) 55'
RW	14	Marion Lièvre
OC	13	Shannon Izar
IC	12	Élodie Poublan	(substituted off) 45'
LW	11	Camille Grassineau
FH	10	Sandrine Agricole
SH	9	Jennyfer Troncy	(substituted off) 65'
N8	8	Safi N'Diaye
OF	7	Coumba Diallo
BF	6	Koumiba Djossouvi
RL	5	Assa Koïta	(substituted off) 62'
LL	4	Sandra Rabier	(substituted off) 40'
TP	3	Elodie Portaries	(substituted off) 57'
HK	2	Gaëlle Mignot (C)	(substituted off) 57'
LP	1	Hélène Ezanno	(substituted off) 40'
Replacements:
HK	16	Laëtitia Salles	(substituted on) 57'
PR	17	Julie Duval	(substituted on) 57'
PR	18	Lise Arricastre	(substituted on) 40'
LK	19	Marine De Nadaï	(substituted on) 40'
FL	20	Manon André	(substituted on) 62'
CE	21	Marjorie Mayans	(substituted on) 45'
FB	22	Jessy Trémoulière	(substituted on) 55'
SH	23	Marie-Alice Yahé	(substituted on) 65'
Coach:
(France) Christian Galonnier

Assistant referees:
Greg Morgan (Wales)
Francesca Martin (Wales)
Assessor:
n/a

=== Week 4 ===
7 March 2014

England	35 – 3	Wales
Tries: Emily Scarratt 26', 40'; Kay Wilson 39'; Natasha Brennan 49'; Margaret Alphonsi 73'; Cons: Emily Scarratt 26', 73'; Pens: Emily Scarratt 13', 20'		Pen: Robyn Wilkins 23'

Twickenham Stoop, London
Referee: Jess Beard (New Zealand)

ENGLAND:
FB	15	Emily Scarratt
RW	14	Katherine Merchant
OC	13	Amber Reed
IC	12	Rachael Burford
LW	11	Kay Wilson	(substituted off) 46'
FH	10	Katy McLean (C)	(substituted off) 56'
SH	9	La Toya Mason	(substituted off) 46'
N8	8	Sarah Hunter
OF	7	Margaret Alphonsi
BF	6	Marlie Packer	(substituted off) 59'
RL	5	Tamara Taylor
LL	4	Rebecca Essex	(substituted off) 56'
TP	3	Sophie Hemming	(substituted off) 56'
HK	2	Emma Croker	(substituted off) 46'
LP	1	Rochelle Clark	(substituted off) 56'
Replacements:
HK	16	Victoria Fleetwood	(substituted on) 46'
PR	17	Sasha Acheson	(substituted on) 56'
PR	18	Laura Keates	(substituted on) 56'
LK	19	Joanna McGilchrist	(substituted on) 56'
FL	20	Hannah Gallagher	(substituted on) 59'
SH	21	Natasha Hunt	(substituted on) 46'
FH	22	Ceri Large	(substituted on) 56'
WG	23	Natasha Brennan	(substituted on) 46'
Coach:
(England) Gary Street

WALES:
FB	15	Elen Evans
RW	14	Ffion Bowen	(substituted off) 60'
OC	13	Robyn Wilkins
IC	12	Rebecca de Filippo	(substituted off) 59'
LW	11	Philippa Tuttiett
FH	10	Elinor Snowsill
SH	9	Amy Day	(substituted off) 51'
N8	8	Sioned Harries
OF	7	Nia Davies
BF	6	Catrina Nicholas
RL	5	Shona Powell Hughes	(substituted off) 41'
LL	4	Rachel Taylor (C)
TP	3	Catrin Edwards	(substituted off) 47'
HK	2	Lowri Harries	(substituted off) 41'
LP	1	Jenny Davies	(substituted off) 51'
Replacements:
HK	16	Carys Phillips	(substituted on) 41'
PR	17	Megan York	(substituted on) 51'
PR	18	Caryl Thomas	(substituted on) 47'
LK	19	Jenny Hawkins	(substituted on) 41'
FL	20	Sian Williams
SH	21	Sian Moore	(substituted on) 51'
CE	22	Laurie Harries	(substituted on) 59'
WG	23	Elli Norkett	(substituted on) 60'
Coach:
(Wales) Rhys Edwards

Assistant referees:
Sara Cox (England)
Tracy Pettingale (England)
Assessor:
n/a

8 March 2014

Ireland	39 – 0	Italy
Tries: Claire Molloy 31'; Lynne Cantwell 37'; Alison Miller 49'; Heather O'Brien 63'; Jenny Murphy 78'; Cons: Niamh Briggs 31', 37', 49'; Nora Stapleton 78'; Pens: Niamh Briggs 5', 27'

Aviva Stadium, Dublin
Referee: Leah Berard (United States)

IRELAND:
FB	15	Niamh Briggs	(substituted off) 69'
RW	14	Ashleigh Baxter
OC	13	Lynne Cantwell	(substituted off) 63'
IC	12	Grace Davitt
LW	11	Alison Miller	(substituted off) 69'
FH	10	Nora Stapleton
SH	9	Amy Davis	(substituted off) 60'
N8	8	Heather O'Brien
OF	7	Claire Molloy
BF	6	Siobhan Fleming	(substituted off) 60'
RL	5	Marie-Louise Reilly
LL	4	Sophie Spence
TP	3	Gillian Bourke	(substituted off) 50'
HK	2	Stacey-Lea Kennedy	(substituted off) 76'
LP	1	Fiona Coghlan (C)	(substituted off) 76'
Replacements:
HK	16	Ailis Egan	(substituted on) 50'
PR	17	Fiona Hayes	(substituted on) 76'
PR	18	Kerrie-Ann Craddock	(substituted on) 76'
LK	19	Paula Fitzpatrick	(substituted on) 60'
SH	20	Larissa Muldoon	(substituted on) 60'
WG	21	Hannah Casey	(substituted on) 69'
CE	22	Jenny Murphy	(substituted on) 63'
FB	23	Jackie Shiels	(substituted on) 69'
Coach:
(Republic of Ireland) Philip Doyle

ITALY:
FB	15	Manuela Furlan
RW	14	Maria Diletta Veronese	(substituted off) 61'
OC	13	Michela Sillari	(substituted off) 69'
IC	12	Beatrice Rigoni
LW	11	Maria Grazia Cioffi
FH	10	Veronica Schiavon	(substituted off) 76'
SH	9	Sara Barattin
N8	8	Silvia Gaudino (C)
OF	7	Ilaria Arrighetti	(substituted off) 69'
BF	6	Michela Este
RL	5	Alice Trevisan	(substituted off) 76'
LL	4	Cristina Molic
TP	3	Awa Coulibaly	(substituted off) 69'
HK	2	Melissa Bettoni	(substituted off) 76'
LP	1	Marta Ferrari	(substituted off) 63'
Replacements:
HK	16	Debora Ballarini	(substituted on) 69'
PR	17	Lucia Cammarano	(substituted on) 63'
PR	18	Irene Campanini	(substituted on) 76'
LK	19	Alessia Pantarotto	(substituted on) 76'
FL	20	Elisa Giordano	(substituted on) 69'
CE	21	Maria Magatti	(substituted on) 69'
CE	22	Monica Bruno	(substituted on) 76'
WG	23	Sofia Stefan	(substituted on) 61'
Coach:
(Italy) Andrea Di Giandomenico

Assistant referees:
Helen O'Reilly (Ireland)
Susan Carty (Ireland)
Assessor:
n/a

9 March 2014

Scotland	0 – 69	France
		Tries: Marion Lièvre 2'; Safi N'Diaye 13', 23'; Gaëlle Mignot 32'; Assa Koïta 38'; Camille Grassineau 39'; Lise Arricastre 55'; Laëtitia Salles 64'; Shannon Izar 68'; Koumiba Djossouvi 74'; Jessy Trémoulière 80'; Cons: Sandrine Agricole 13', 23', 38', 39'; Christelle Le Duff 55', 68', 74'

New Hawthornden Stadium, Bonnyrigg, Midlothian
Referee: Amy Perrett (Australia)

SCOTLAND:
FB	15	Stephanie Johnston
RW	14	Annabel Sergeant	(substituted off) 40'
OC	13	Gillian Inglis
IC	12	Laura Steven	(substituted off) 40'
LW	11	Katy Green	(substituted off) 58'
FH	10	Tanya Griffith
SH	9	Sarah Law	(substituted off) 50'
N8	8	Jade Konkel
OF	7	Tess Forsberg	(substituted off) 50'
BF	6	Ruth Slaven
RL	5	Emma Wassell
LL	4	Deborah McCormack
TP	3	Tracy Balmer (C)
HK	2	Lindsey Smith	(substituted off) 40'
LP	1	Heather Lockhart	(substituted off) 70'
Replacements:
HK	16	Lana Skeldon	(substituted on) 40'
PR	17	Karen Dunbar	(substituted on) 70'
PR	18	Lisa Robertson
LK	19	Rachael Cook	(substituted on) 50'
SH	20	Louise Dalgliesh	(substituted on) 50'
FH	21	Lisa Martin	(substituted on) 40'
WG	22	Megan Gaffney	(substituted on) 40'
WG	23	Sarah Smith	(substituted on) 58'
Coach:
(Scotland) Jules Maxton

FRANCE:
FB	15	Christelle Le Duff
RW	14	Marion Lièvre
OC	13	Shannon Izar
IC	12	Marjorie Mayans
LW	11	Camille Grassineau	(substituted off) 40'
FH	10	Sandrine Agricole	(substituted off) 40'
SH	9	Jennyfer Troncy	(substituted off) 59'
N8	8	Safi N'Diaye
OF	7	Coumba Diallo	(substituted off) 55'
BF	6	Koumiba Djossouvi
RL	5	Assa Koïta	(substituted off) 45'
LL	4	Sandra Rabier
TP	3	Elodie Portaries	(substituted off) 35'
HK	2	Gaëlle Mignot (C)	(substituted off) 45'
LP	1	Hélène Ezanno	(substituted off) 39'
Replacements:
HK	16	Laëtitia Salles	(substituted on) 45'
PR	17	Julie Duval	(substituted on) 35'
PR	18	Lise Arricastre	(substituted on) 39'
LK	19	Marine De Nadaï	(substituted on) 45'
FL	20	Laëtitia Grand	(substituted on) 55'
CE	21	Élodie Poublan	(substituted on) 40'
FH	22	Jessy Trémoulière	(substituted on) 40'
WG	23	Yanna Rivoalen	(substituted on) 59'
Coach:
(France) Christian Galonnier

Assistant referees:
Alex Pratt (Scotland)
Mhairi Hay (Scotland)
Assessor:
Kate Todd (United States)

=== Week 5 ===
14 March 2014

France	19 – 15	Ireland
Tries: Marion Lièvre 6'; Elodie Portaries 43'; Shannon Izar 52'; Cons: Sandrine Agricole 43', 52'		Tries: Gillian Bourke 59', 71'; Con: Niamh Briggs 71'; Pen: Niamh Briggs 49'

Stade du Hameau, Pau, Pyrénées-Atlantiques
Referee: Leah Berard (United States)

FRANCE:
FB	15	Christelle Le Duff	(substituted off) 54'
RW	14	Marion Lièvre
OC	13	Shannon Izar	(substituted off) 58'
IC	12	Marjorie Mayans
LW	11	Camille Grassineau
FH	10	Sandrine Agricole
SH	9	Jennyfer Troncy	(substituted off) 75'
N8	8	Safi N'Diaye
OF	7	Coumba Diallo
BF	6	Koumiba Djossouvi	(substituted off) 53'
RL	5	Assa Koïta	(substituted off) 70'
LL	4	Marine De Nadaï
TP	3	Elodie Portaries	(substituted off) 58'
HK	2	Gaëlle Mignot (C)	(substituted off) 53'
LP	1	Hélène Ezanno	(substituted off) 47'
Replacements:
HK	16	Laëtitia Salles	(substituted on) 53'
PR	17	Julie Duval	(substituted on) 58'
PR	18	Lise Arricastre	(substituted on) 47'
LK	19	Sandra Rabier	(substituted on) 70'
FL	20	Laëtitia Grand	(substituted on) 53'
CE	21	Élodie Poublan	(substituted on) 58'
FH	22	Jessy Trémoulière	(substituted on) 54'
SH	23	Yanna Rivoalen	(substituted on) 75'
Coach:
(France) Christian Galonnier

IRELAND:
FB	15	Niamh Briggs
RW	14	Ashleigh Baxter	(substituted off) 70'
OC	13	Lynne Cantwell
IC	12	Jenny Murphy	(substituted off) 65'
LW	11	Alison Miller
FH	10	Nora Stapleton
SH	9	Larissa Muldoon
N8	8	Heather O'Brien
OF	7	Claire Molloy
BF	6	Siobhan Fleming	(substituted off) 60'
RL	5	Marie-Louise Reilly
LL	4	Sophie Spence
TP	3	Ailis Egan	(substituted off) 63'
HK	2	Gillian Bourke
LP	1	Fiona Coghlan (C)
Replacements:
HK	16	Stacey-Lea Kennedy	(substituted on) 63'
PR	17	Fiona Hayes
PR	18	Kerrie-Ann Craddock
LK	19	Paula Fitzpatrick	(substituted on) 60'
SH	20	Amy Davis
CE	21	Grace Davitt	(substituted on) 65'
WG	22	Hannah Casey	(substituted on) 70'
FB	23	Jackie Shiels
Coach:
(Republic of Ireland) Philip Doyle

Assistant referees:
Guillaume Trieux (France)
Didier Mastoumecq (France)
Assessor:
Wayne Erickson (Australia)

16 March 2014

Wales	25 – 0	Scotland
Tries: Nia Davies 1'; Shona Powell Hughes 8'; Philippa Tuttiett 15'; Ffion Bowen 34'; Con: Robyn Wilkins 15'; Pen: Robyn Wilkins 40'

Talbot Athletic Ground, Port Talbot, West Glamorgan
Referee: Sherry Trumbull (Canada)

WALES:
FB	15	Dyddgu Hywel
RW	14	Ffion Bowen
OC	13	Elen Evans
IC	12	Robyn Wilkins
LW	11	Philippa Tuttiett
FH	10	Elinor Snowsill
SH	9	Sian Moore
N8	8	Sioned Harries
OF	7	Nia Davies
BF	6	Rachel Taylor (C)
RL	5	Shona Powell Hughes
LL	4	Jenny Hawkins
TP	3	Catrin Edwards
HK	2	Lowri Harries
LP	1	Jenny Davies
Replacements:
HK	16	Carys Phillips	Substituted on
PR	17	Megan York	Substituted on
PR	18	Caryl Thomas	Substituted on
LK	19	Catrina Nicholas	Substituted on
FL	20	Sian Williams	Substituted on
SH	21	Amy Day	Substituted on
CE	22	Rebecca de Filippo	Substituted on
WG	23	Laurie Harries	Substituted on
Coach:
(Wales) Rhys Edwards

SCOTLAND:
FB	15	Stephanie Johnston
RW	14	Annabel Sergeant
OC	13	Laura Steven
IC	12	Gillian Inglis
LW	11	Megan Gaffney
FH	10	Lisa Martin
SH	9	Sarah Law
N8	8	Jade Konkel
OF	7	Tess Forsberg
BF	6	Rachael Cook
RL	5	Emma Wassell
LL	4	Deborah McCormack
TP	3	Tracy Balmer (C)
HK	2	Lana Skeldon
LP	1	Karen Dunbar
Replacements:
HK	16	Lindsey Smith	Substituted on
PR	17	Heather Lockhart	Substituted on
PR	18	Lisa Robertson
LK	19	Ruth Slaven
FL	20	Lyndsay O'Donnell	Substituted on
SH	21	Louise Dalgliesh	Substituted on
WG	22	Katy Green
WG	23	Sarah Smith
Coach:
(Scotland) Jules Maxton

Assistant referees:
Jason Langdon (Wales)
Francesca Martin (Wales)
Assessor:
n/a

16 March 2014

Italy	0 – 24	England
		Tries: Emily Scarratt 13'; Danielle Waterman 33'; Laura Keates 43'; Amber Reed 70'; Cons: Emily Scarratt 33', 70'

Stadio Giulio e Silvio Pagani, Rovato, Brescia
Referee: Marlize Jordaan (South Africa)

ITALY:
FB	15	Manuela Furlan	(substituted off) 76'
RW	14	Maria Diletta Veronese	(substituted off) 79'
OC	13	Maria Grazia Cioffi
IC	12	Sofia Stefan
LW	11	Michela Sillari
FH	10	Beatrice Rigoni	(substituted off) 20'
SH	9	Sara Barattin
N8	8	Silvia Gaudino (C)
OF	7	Ilaria Arrighetti	(substituted off) 50'
BF	6	Michela Este	(substituted off) 76'
RL	5	Alice Trevisan	(substituted off) 74'
LL	4	Cristina Molic
TP	3	Marta Ferrari	(substituted off) 79'
HK	2	Melissa Bettoni
LP	1	Awa Coulibaly	(substituted off) 68'
Replacements:
HK	16	Debora Ballarini	(substituted on) 79'
PR	17	Lucia Cammarano	(substituted on) 68'
PR	18	Irene Campanini	(substituted on) 76'
LK	19	Alessia Pantarotto	(substituted on) 50'
FL	20	Valentina Ruzza	(substituted on) 74'
SH	21	Monica Bruno	(substituted on) 79'
CE	22	Maria Magatti	(substituted on) 20'
WG	23	Chiara Buongiorno	(substituted on) 76'
Coach:
(Italy) Andrea Di Giandomenico

ENGLAND:
FB	15	Danielle Waterman
RW	14	Katherine Merchant	(substituted off) 40'
OC	13	Emily Scarratt
IC	12	Amber Reed
LW	11	Natasha Brennan
FH	10	Ceri Large	(substituted off) 63'
SH	9	Natasha Hunt	(substituted off) 40'
N8	8	Rebecca Essex
OF	7	Margaret Alphonsi	(substituted off) 63'
BF	6	Sarah Hunter (C)	(substituted off) 63'
RL	5	Tamara Taylor
LL	4	Joanna McGilchrist
TP	3	Laura Keates	(substituted off) 60'
HK	2	Victoria Fleetwood	(substituted off) 60'
LP	1	Rochelle Clark	(substituted off) 40'
Replacements:
HK	16	Mercedes Foy	(substituted on) 60'
PR	17	Claire Purdy	(substituted on) 40'
PR	18	Sophie Hemming	(substituted on) 60'
LK	19	Hannah Gallagher	(substituted on) 63'
FL	20	Marlie Packer	(substituted on) 63'
SH	21	Georgina Gulliver	(substituted on) 40'
FH	22	Katy McLean	(substituted on) 63'
WG	23	Lydia Thompson	(substituted on) 40'
Coach:
(England) Gary Street

Assistant referees:
Barbara Guastini (Italy)
Doranna De Carlini (Italy)
Assessor:
Michel Lamoulie (France)
