= Ffion =

Ffion [ˈfiː.ɔn] is a Welsh feminine given name meaning foxglove.

== People with this name ==
- Aimee-Ffion Edwards, Welsh actress and singer
- Ffion Bowen, Welsh rugby union player
- Ffion Davies, Welsh practitioner of Brazilian jiu-jitsu
- Ffion Hague, wife of former Conservative Party leader and former Foreign Secretary William Hague
- Ffion Morgan, Welsh footballer
- Holly Ffion Humberstone, English singer-songwriter

== Fictional characters ==
- Ffion Foxwell, a character in the Black Mirror episode "The Entire History of You", played by Jodie Whittaker
- DI Ffion Lloyd, a detective in the 2025 Welsh TV series The One That Got Away
- Ffion Morgan, a character in the television series Casualty.
