= Robyn Wilkins =

Wales international rugby union player

- Born: 1 April 1995 (age 31) Bridgend, South Wales
- Height: 5 ft 7 in (1.70 m)
- Weight: 65 kg (143 lb)
- School: Porthcawl Comprehensive School
- University: Cardiff University
- Notable relative: Gwilym Wilkins (father)
- Occupation: Rugby player/ Senior Sport Officer
- Height and weight correct as of 14 April 2021

Rugby union career
- Position(s): Centre, Fly-half, Full-back
- Current team: Sale Sharks Women
Senior career
| Years | Team | Apps | (Points) |
| – | Ospreys | | |
| – | Cardiff Blues Women | | |
| – | Llandaff North RFC | | |
| – | Worcester Warriors | | |
| – | Gloucester-Hartpury | | |
| 2022–2024 | Exeter Chiefs Women | | |
| 2024– | Sale Sharks Women | | |
International career
| Years | Team | Apps | (Points) |
| 2014–present | Wales | 71 | (0) |

Robyn Olivia Wilkins (born 1 April 1995) is a Welsh rugby union player who has played either centre, fly-half or full-back for the Wales women's national rugby union team and Sale Sharks Women in Premiership Women's Rugby.

She made her debut for the Wales national squad in 2014 and has played over 70 matches for the national side. Wilkins played for Ospreys, Cardiff Blues Women and Llandaff North RFC at Welsh regional level before moving to Worcester Warriors in the English Premiership. Before taking a professional contract with the WRU she worked as a science teacher at Bassaleg Comprehensive School in Newport. Alongside her professional contract with the WRU, Wilkins also works for Disability Sport Wales as a Senior Sports Officer and organises the annual Para Sport Festival based in Swansea.

== Personal life and education ==
On 1 April 1995, Wilkins was born in Bridgend in Wales. She is the daughter of the Welsh former one-time international rugby fly-half Gwilym Wilkins. Wilkins plays either as centre, fly-half or full-back in rugby union. She is listed as 5 ft 7 in (1.70 m) and weighs 65 kg (143 lb) according to her biography from the Welsh Rugby Union (WRU) and Eurosport. Wilkins was educated at Porthcawl Comprehensive School from 2006 to 2013 and later matriculated to Cardiff University to study a Bachelor of Science degree in Biomedical Science between 2013 and 2016. She taught science at Bassaleg Comprehensive School in Newport while continuing her rugby career. Before embarking on her teaching career, Wilkins ventured between hospitals in Birmingham and Wales selling radioactive substances to nuclear medicine department in her role working as an account manager for a medical imaging company.

== Early career ==
She began playing rugby around the age of seven or eight while in primary school and at Pyle RFC, having observed her father participate in the sport. Wilkins at first played alongside boys but was segregated approaching adolescence as is common in team sports. Following time away from rugby between the ages of 11 and 15, she learnt Pencoed had a rugby team and played in its Under 18s side at schools before moving to the Ospreys Under 18s squad. Wilkins learnt Wales had a women's rugby union team when she was around 15 or 16. She played as part of the Girls Under 18 Dragons "A" winning team in the 2013 UK Student Games at Abbeydale Sports Ground in Sheffield.

== International career ==
In 2014, Wilkins was called up to the Wales women's national rugby union team, making her international debut against Italy in the first match of the 2014 Women's Six Nations Championship, scoring two penalties. A gain of weight and decrease in fitness as a result of low confidence and motivation affected her performance throughout 2015 but an increase in training reversed all that the following year due to help she received from the WRU's conditioning and strength coach.

Wilkins has played for the Wales national team 71 times since her debut in 2014, reaching the 50 cap milestone against Ireland at the 2021 Women's Six Nations Championship. She played 33 Women's Six Nations matches, scoring two tries and 77 points. Wilkins competed for Wales at the 2014 Women's Rugby World Cup, the 2017 Women's Rugby World Cup and the 2021 Rugby World Cup. She has also played for the Wales women's national rugby sevens team.

Wilkins was selected in Wales squad for the 2021 Rugby World Cup in New Zealand.

She was named in the Welsh side for the 2025 Six Nations Championship on 4 March 2025.

== Club career ==
At the club level, she has played for Ospreys, Cardiff Blues Women and Llandaff North RFC. Wilkins signed for Worcester Warriors Women of Premier 15s in August 2020 having impressed lead coach Sian Moore. Leaving Worcester in 2021, she has since played for Gloucester-Hartpury and then for Exeter Chiefs women, who she signed with ahead of the 2022-23 Premier 15s season. Wilkins was in the Exeter squad that reached the Premiership final with in 2022. In summer 2024, it was announced that Wilkins had signed for northern club Sale Sharks. Whilst teaching at Bassaleg Comprehensive School, Wilkins was a member of Wales' Sisters in Arms programme and helped students at the School build a team in the Urdd WRU sevens competition. Wilkins previously worked for Cardiff Blues' Unstoppables women's campaign.
