= Melissa Bettoni =

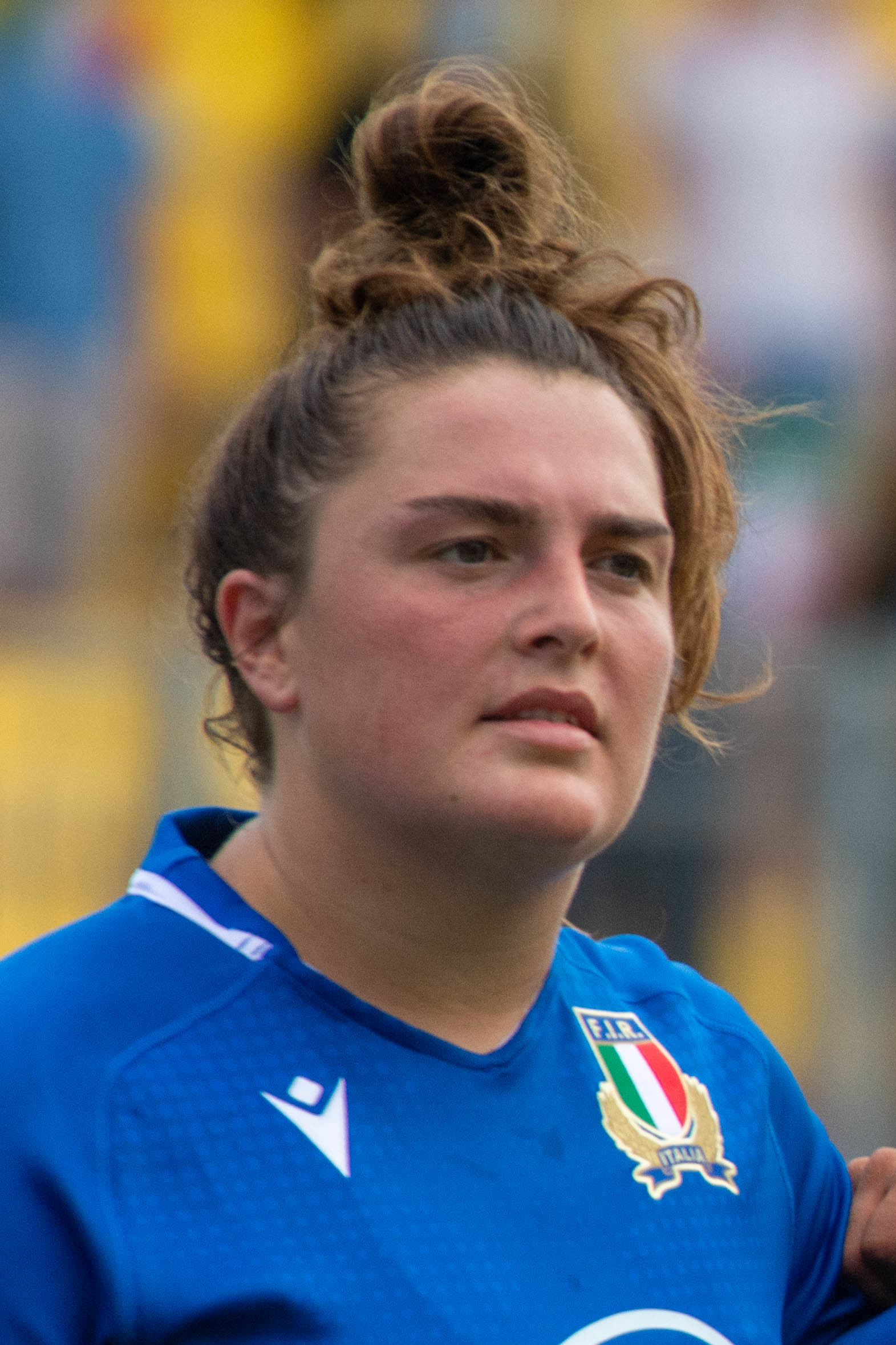
- Bettoni before the RWC 2021 qualification match against Spain
- Born: 7 May 1991 (age 35) Borgosesia, Italy
- Height: 175 cm (5 ft 9 in)
- Weight: 87 kg (192 lb; 13 st 10 lb)

Rugby union career
- Position: Hooker
Amateur team(s)
Years	Team	Apps	(Points)
	Valsesia		(0)
Senior career
Years	Team	Apps	(Points)
2009–2012	Red & Blu		(0)
2012–2013	Grenoble		(0)
2013–2014	Red & Blu		(0)
2014–2022	Stade Rennais		(0)
International career
Years	Team	Apps	(Points)
2011–2022	Italy	76	(70)

Melissa Bettoni (born 7 May 1991) is a former Italian rugby union player. She played Hooker for Italy internationally and for French club, Stade Rennais, before her retirement.

== Rugby career ==
Bettoni was born in Borgosesia, she started playing rugby in 2008 in Piedmont, aged 17 as an agricultural student, with a small club called Valsesia before establishing herself for the Red & Blu Rugby club in the Serie A competition.

On 12 February 2012, She made her test debut together with Michela Sillari in Recco, in a very tough match against England during the Six Nations Championship. In 2012 she made her first appearance for Grenoble before spending a semester in New Zealand.

Having returned to Italy, she became a regular in the national team and was decisive in their 2014 Six Nations win over Wales, she scored a try in the 61st minute which saw the Azzurre make a comeback from 0–8 down with 19 minutes to go.

In 2014, after a further season in Rome, she moved again to France to play for Stade Rennais, alternating her sporting activity with her work as a babysitter; she was part of the team called up by coach Andrea Di Giandomenico for the 2017 Women's Rugby World Cup in Ireland, where Italy finished ninth.

On 9 September 2022, during a warm-up win against France in preparation for the World Cup, Melissa Bettoni took on the role of captain for the first time due to an injury sustained by captain Manuela Furlan.

At the end of the World Cup she retired from rugby which she had announced at the end of her last season in France, to open an Italian restaurant with her French husband; she boasts a total of 76 international matches with 14 tries scored for Italy.

=== Coaching ===
In 2023, Bettoni rejoined Le Azzurre as a forwards coach for the Italy women’s U-20 team.
