= Gaëlle Mignot =

French rugby union player

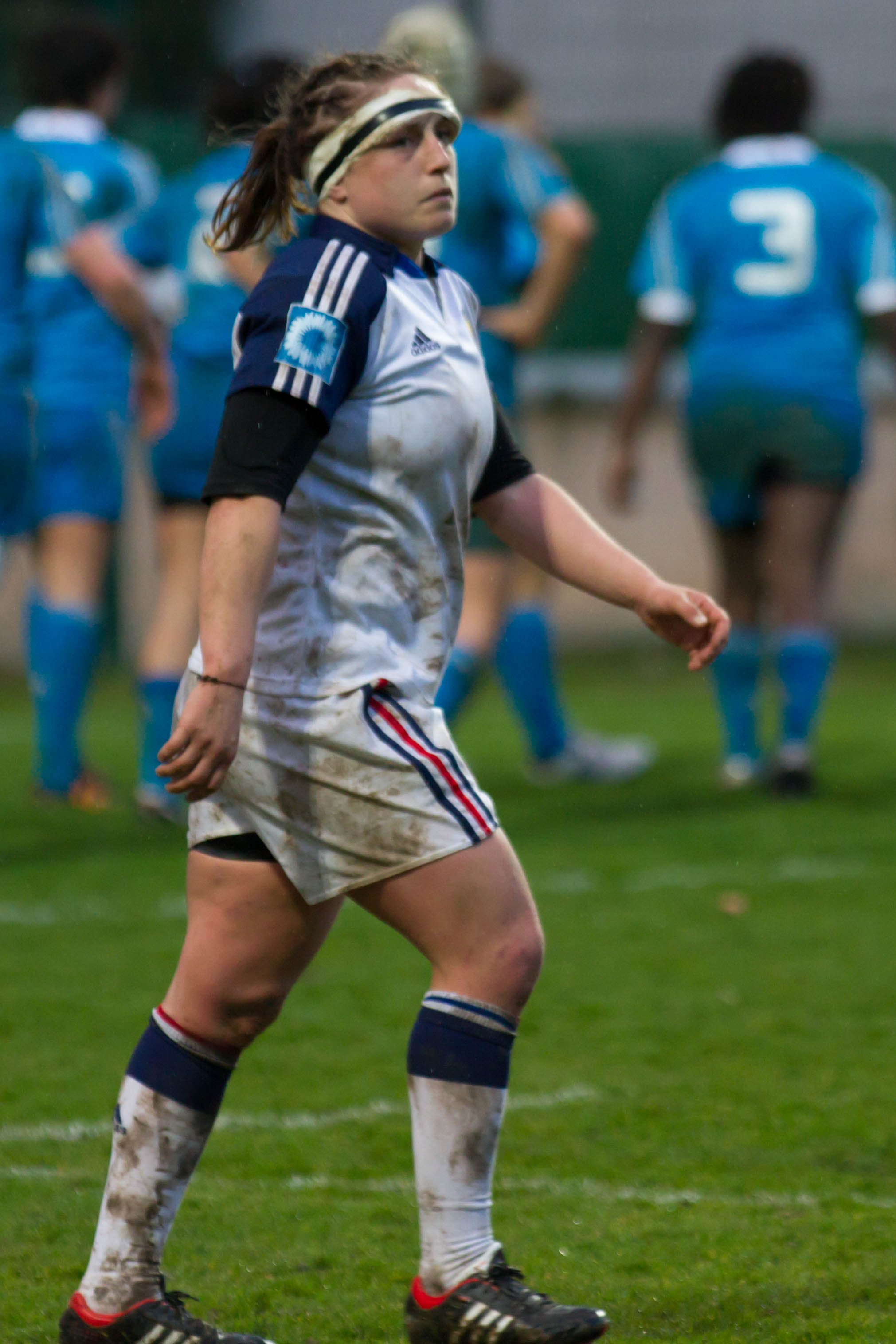
- Mignot with France in 2014
- Born: 26 February 1987 (age 39) Périgueux (Dordogne)
- Height: 1.57 m (5 ft 2 in)
- Weight: 69 kg (152 lb)

Rugby union career
- Position: Hooker
Senior career
Years	Team	Apps	(Points)
2008-2017	Montpellier RC		
2017-2018	Richmond F.C.		
2018-2021	Montpellier RC		
International career
Years	Team	Apps	(Points)
2010-2018	France	70	
Coaching career
- Years: Team
- 2021-: Montpellier HR (espoirs)
- 2022-: France

Gaëlle Mignot (born 26 February 1987) is a French female rugby union player. She represented France at the 2010 Women's Rugby World Cup, and 2014 Women's Rugby World Cup.

She has played the majority of her career for Montpellier (women's rugby union) in the French women's Premier Division. In September 2017 Mignot moved to England and signed for Richmond F.C. to play for the south-west London club in the newly formed Tyrrells Premier League.

Mignot captained the French squad at the 2014 Women's Six Nations Championship and scored two tries in their opening game against England.

In 2019, she was on the first panel to determine the World Rugby women's-15s player-of-the-year award with Melodie Robinson, Danielle Waterman, Will Greenwood, Liza Burgess, Lynne Cantwell, Fiona Coghlan, Jillion Potter, Stephen Jones, and Karl Te Nana.

In May 2022, five months before the World Cup in New Zealand, she was appointed assistant coach of the French National Team, in charge of scrum and contact attitudes. In December 2022, with then coach Thomas Darracq leaving the team, Gaëlle Mignot and David Ortiz were appointed joint head coaches of the team.
