= Koumiba Djossouvi =

French rugby union player

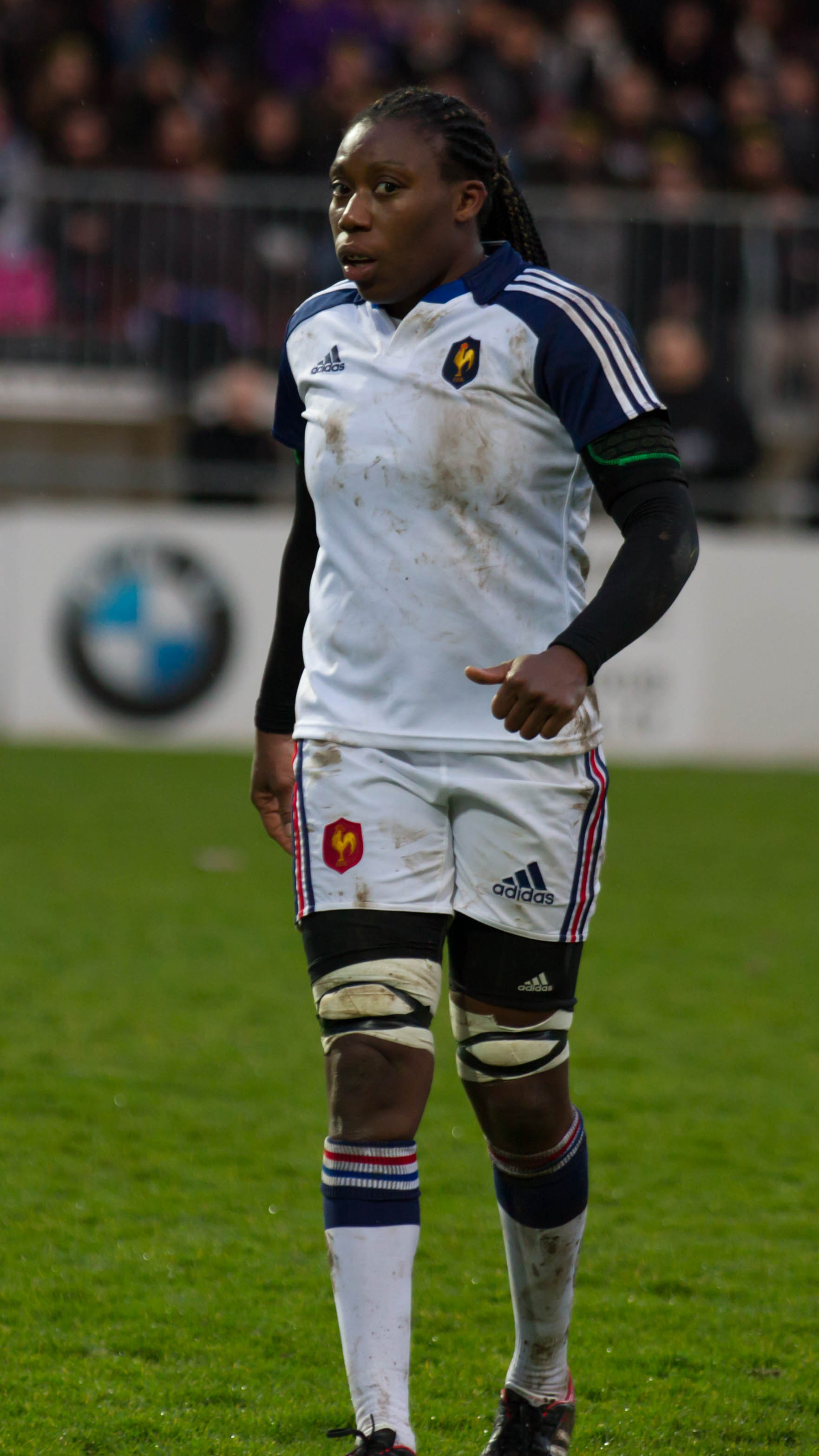
- Born: 2 November 1982 (age 44)
- Height: 1.7 m (5 ft 7 in)
- Weight: 72 kg (159 lb; 11 st 5 lb)

Rugby union career
- Position: Loose forward
Senior career
Years	Team	Apps	(Points)
- Montpellier
International career
Years	Team	Apps	(Points)
2009–present	France		
National sevens team
Years	Team		Comps
2013	France		

Koumiba Djossouvi (born 2 November 1982) is a French female rugby union player who played as loose forward. She represented France at the 2014 Women's Rugby World Cup. She was a member of the squad that won their fourth Six Nations title in 2014.

Djossouvi played at the 2013 Rugby World Cup Sevens.
