= Hannah Casey =

Irish rugby union player

- Born: 20 September 1988 (age 38)
- Height: 1.76 m (5 ft 9 1/2 in)
- Weight: 71 kg (157 lb; 11 st 3 lb)

Rugby union career
- Position: Centre
Amateur team(s)
Years	Team	Apps	(Points)
- Tabard RFC
–	Saracens & Tabard RFC		
–	Ireland The Barbarians		

Hannah Casey (born 20 September 1988) is an Irish rugby union player. She was a member of the Irish squad at the 2014 Women's Rugby World Cup. Also starting player for the invitational Barbarians She made her international debut in Ireland's opening match against Scotland at the 2014 Six Nations Championship.
