= Kerrie-Ann Craddock =

- Born: 30 August 1984 (age 42)
- Height: 1.8 m (5 ft 11 in)
- Weight: 88 kg (194 lb; 13 st 12 lb)

Rugby union career
- Position: Prop
Senior career
Years	Team	Apps	(Points)
2013-Present	Saracens		
International career
Years	Team	Apps	(Points)
2014	Ireland		

Kerrie-Ann Craddock (born 30 August 1984) is a female rugby union player for Ireland. She was a member of the Irish squad to the 2014 Women's Rugby World Cup in France. She made her international debut at the 2014 Women's Six Nations Championship in Ireland's opening match against Scotland. She is a mathematics teacher. She is now teaching at Bideford College.
