= Elli Norkett =

Welsh rugby union player (1996–2017)

- Born: 30 May 1996 Ribchester, Lancashire, England
- Died: 25 February 2017 (aged 20) Neath Port Talbot, Wales
- Height: 1.68 m (5.5 ft)
- Weight: 76 kg (12.0 st)
- University: Cardiff Metropolitan University

Rugby union career
- Position: Winger
Amateur team(s)
Years	Team	Apps	(Points)
2014–16	Neath Athletic		
2016–17	Swansea Ladies		
Senior career
Years	Team	Apps	(Points)
2016–17	Ospreys		
- Correct as of 26 February 2017
International career
Years	Team	Apps	(Points)
2014–17	Wales	4	
- Correct as of 26 February 2017
National sevens team
Years	Team		Comps
2013–17	Wales		

Elli Norkett (30 May 1996 – 25 February 2017) was a Welsh rugby union player who played for Swansea Ladies/Ospreys and the Wales women's national rugby union team. She was the youngest player at the 2014 Women's Rugby World Cup, having made her debut earlier that year in the Six Nations Championship.

== Early life ==
Elli Norkett was born on 30 May 1996 in Ribchester, Lancashire. She attended Mary Immaculate Roman Catholic Primary School in Haverfordwest, Pembrokeshire.

== Sporting career ==
Norkett studied at Cardiff Metropolitan University for bachelor's degree in sports development. While there, she played for the University's teams which competed in the British Universities and Colleges Sport (BUCS) women's rugby competitions. In early 2016, she was part of the Cardiff team that defeated Northumbria University at Twickenham Stadium to win the BUCS rugby union tournament. Afterwards, she spoke of her home to also win the BUCS rugby sevens tournament for her University, and hoped to appear in the International University Sports Federation world rugby sevens later that year.

At a club level, Norkett played for both Neath Athletic and Swansea Ladies, both feeder clubs for Ospreys. During the course of 2017, she played for Swansea.

In rugby sevens, Norkett represented both Wales and the Great Britain students team. She was selected for the Wales women's national rugby union team at the 2014 Women's Rugby World Cup, becoming the youngest player at the tournament. During the course of her career for the senior rugby union squad, she earned four international caps. Her debut was against France earlier that year in the Six Nations Championship when she was brought on as a substitute in the second half.

== Personal life ==
Norkett lived in Llandarcy, Neath Port Talbot. Prior to enrolling at Cardiff Metropolitan University, she attended Neath Port Talbot College, where she was named sportswoman of the year as well as player of the year for both rugby and netball.

== Death ==
On 25 February 2017, Norkett died as a result of a car crash on the A4109, near Glynneath, Neath Port Talbot. She was 20 years old.
