= Sian Williams (rugby union) =

Wales international rugby union footballer

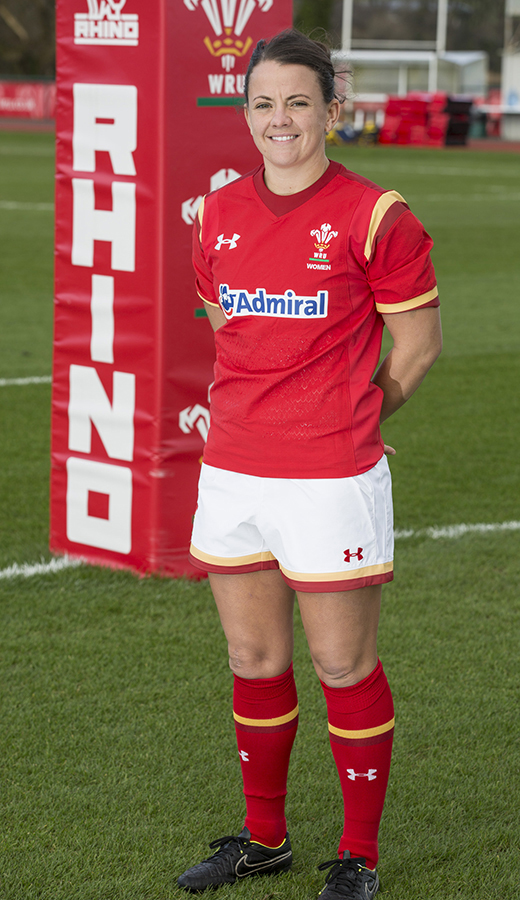
- Sian Williams in 2016
- Born: 26 October 1990 (age 36) Wrexham, Wales
- Height: 1.62 m (5 ft 4 in)
- Weight: 74 kg (11 st 9 lb)

Rugby union career
- Position: Back row
- Current team: Worcester/Newport Gwent Dragons
Amateur team(s)
Years	Team	Apps	(Points)
- Worcester
–	Newport Gwent Dragons		
International career
Years	Team	Apps	(Points)
2011–present	Wales	23	
- Correct as of 2 May 2016

Sian Williams (born 23 October 1990) is a Welsh rugby union player who plays in the back row for Worcester/Newport Gwent Dragons and the Wales women's national rugby union team. She won her first international cap against Scotland in the 2011 Women's Six Nations Championship. She is the younger sister of Wales Rugby League international Rhys Williams who is Wales' all-time top try scorer in that code. In 2016, she was listed as one of BBC's 100 Women.

== Playing career ==
Sian Williams was born in Wrexham, Clwyd on 4 April 1993. As of 2016, her official Wales Rugby Union biography states that she is 1.62 metres (5.3 ft) tall, and weighs 74 kilograms (11.7 st). Williams has been playing rugby since she was eight, when she played with her brothers. She was called up for the Wales women's under-20 national rugby union team, and captained the team in a victory over England in 2011. She made her debut for the Wales women's national rugby union team that same year, playing against Scotland in the 2011 Women's Six Nations Championship.

Outside of rugby, she was a logistics mover with the rank of Senior Aircraftwoman for the Royal Air Force. She had joined the RAF in 2008, and played for the RAF Rugby Union Women's team and the Combined Services' Women teams. That was until 10 February 2016, when it was announced that Williams had signed a professional rugby contract, having been granted elite athlete status by the RAF meaning that she would continue to be employed by the forces while being able to train full-time.

It was the first time any Welsh woman had signed a professional rugby contract. She previously lived in Oxford and would commute three times a week to train with the national team, and twice a week to Worcester to train with her club. Following the signing of the professional contract, Williams was re-located to RAF St Athan, where she could train with Wales head coach Rhys Edwards on a full-time basis for the next two years.
