= Jessy Trémoulière =

French rugby union player

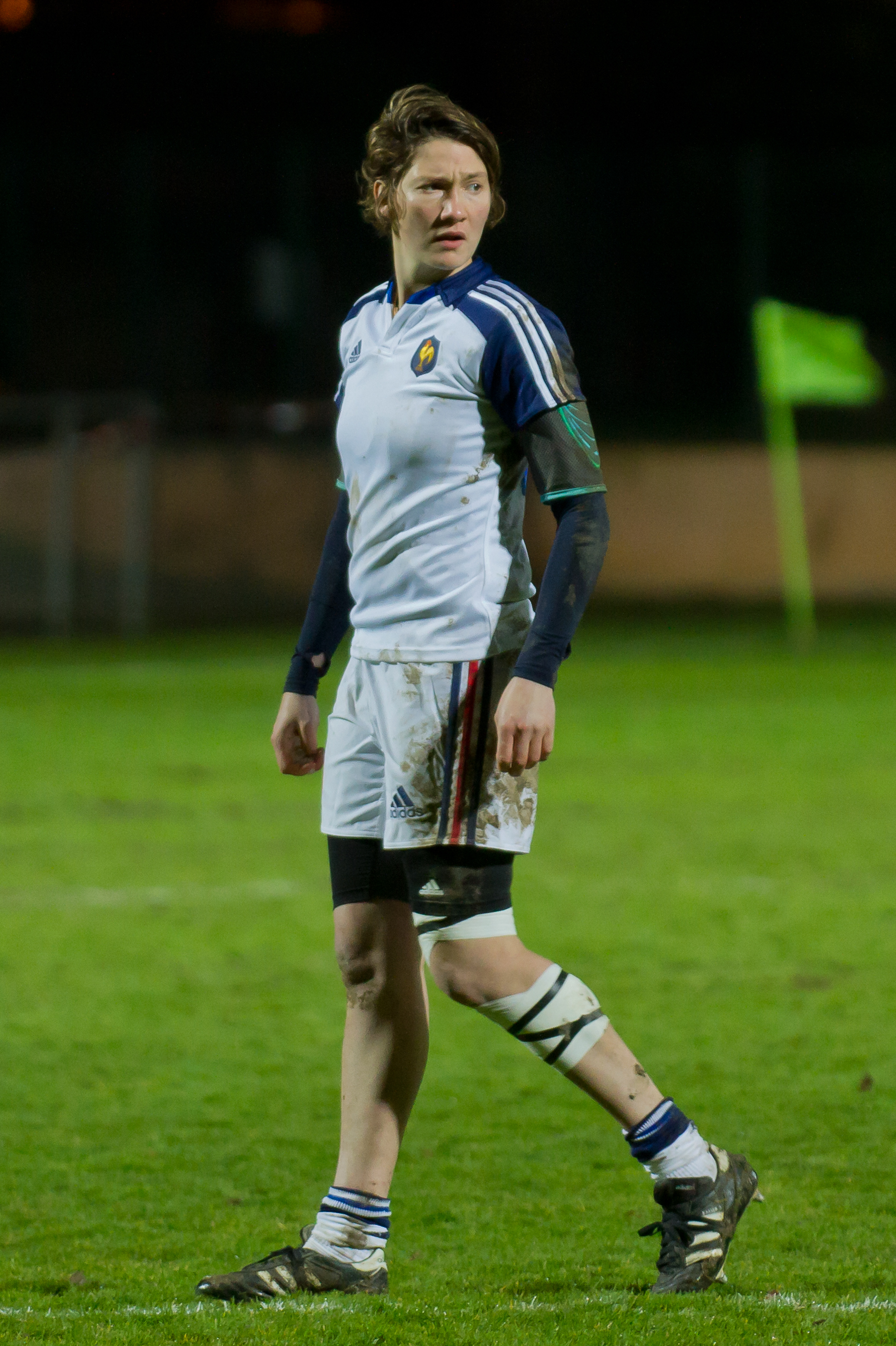
- Trémoulière with France in 2014
- Born: 29 July 1992 (age 34)
- Height: 1.80 m (5 ft 11 in)
- Weight: 73 kg (161 lb)

Rugby union career
- Position: Fullback
- Current team: ASM Romagnat
Senior career
| Years | Team | Apps | (Points) |
| 2008-2010 | ASC Bonnefont | - | (-) |
| 2010-2017 | ASM Romagnat | - | (-) |
| 2017-2019 | Stade Rennais Rugby | - | (-) |
| 2019- | ASM Romagnat | - | (-) |
International career
| Years | Team | Apps | (Points) |
| 2011-2023 | France | 78 | (-) |

Jessy Marie Trémoulière (born 29 July 1992) is a French rugby union player who plays as a fullback. She represented France at the 2014 and 2017 Women's Rugby World Cup. She was a member of the squad that won their fourth Six Nations title in 2014. She was a member of the France women's national rugby sevens team to the 2016 Summer Olympics. She was named player of the year 2018 at the world rugby award.

Trémoulière was named as the Women’s 15s Player of the Decade by World Rugby via a worldwide public vote. In 2022, she was named in France's team for the 2021 Rugby World Cup in New Zealand, played in late 2022 due to delay linked to the COVID-19 pandemic.
