= Marine De Nadaï =

French rugby union player

- Born: 2 June 1988 (age 38)
- Height: 1.83 m (6 ft 0 in)
- Weight: 88 kg (194 lb; 13 st 12 lb)

Rugby union career
- Position: Lock
Senior career
Years	Team	Apps	(Points)
- Montpellier
International career
Years	Team	Apps	(Points)
	France	22	

Marine De Nadaï (born 2 June 1988) is a French rugby union player. She represented France at the 2014 Women's Rugby World Cup. She was a member of the squad that won their fourth Six Nations title in 2014.
