= Gwilym Wilkins =

Wales international rugby union player

- Born: 4 May 1967 (age 59) Parramatta, Sydney, Australia
- Notable relative: Robyn Wilkins (daughter)

Rugby union career
- Position: Wing
International career
Years	Team	Apps	(Points)
1994	Wales	1	(0)

Gwilym Wilkins (born 4 May 1967) is a Welsh former rugby union international.

A winger, Wilkins was capped once for Wales, against Tonga at Nuku A'lofa in 1994. He was one of four new Wales caps blooded in that game, with Wales claiming a record fifth successive away win. His place on the tour only came about through an injury to Llanelli player Ian Jones, having not initially been named on the touring party. He spent most of his career with Bridgend and Aberavon, but also had some experience of club rugby in Australia, where he had been born.

Wilkins is the father of Wales player Robyn Wilkins.

== See also ==
- List of Wales national rugby union players
