= Christelle Le Duff =

French rugby union player

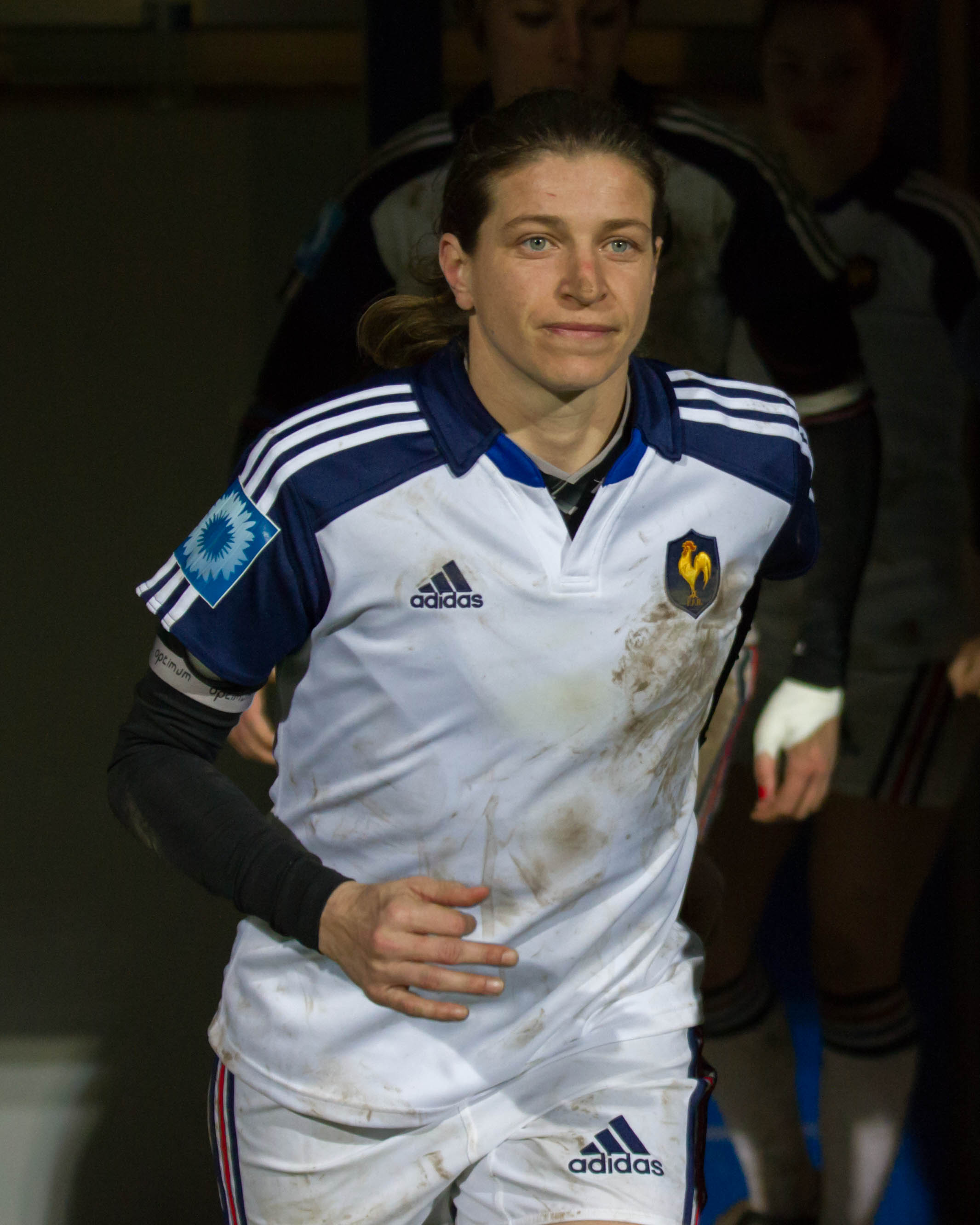
- Le Duff in action against Italy at the 2014 Six Nations
- Born: 21 November 1982 (age 43)
- Height: 1.65 m (5 ft 5 in)
- Weight: 62 kg (137 lb)

Rugby union career
- Position: Flyhalf
Senior career
Years	Team	Apps	(Points)
- USA Perpignan
International career
Years	Team	Apps	(Points)
2001–present	France		
National sevens team
Years	Team		Comps
2011–present	France		

Christelle Le Duff (born 21 November 1982) is a French rugby union player. She represented France at the 2006 Women's Rugby World Cup, and 2014 Women's Rugby World Cup. She was a member of France's 2013 Rugby World Cup Sevens squad.
