= Camille Grassineau =

French rugby union player (born 1990)

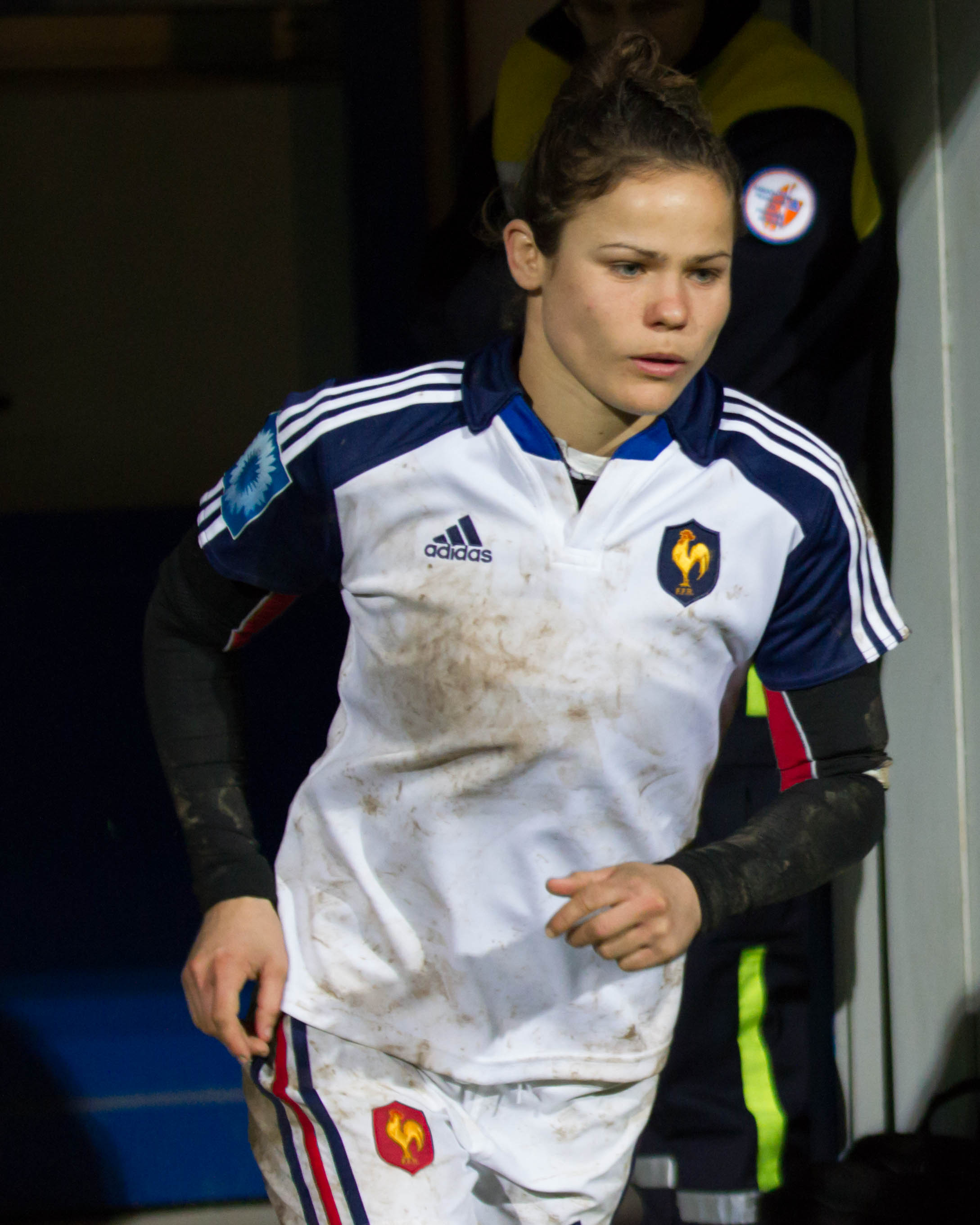
- Grassineau at the 2014 Six Nations
- Born: 10 September 1990 (age 36)
- Height: 1.65 m (5 ft 5 in)
- Weight: 58 kg (128 lb)

Rugby union career
- Position: Wing
Senior career
Years	Team	Apps	(Points)
- Bordeaux
International career
Years	Team	Apps	(Points)
- France
National sevens team
Years	Team		Comps
- France
Medal record
Representing France
Women's rugby sevens
Olympic Games
Silver medal – second place	2020 Tokyo	Team competition
Rugby World Cup Sevens
Bronze medal – third place	2022 Cape Town	Team competition

Camille Grassineau (born 10 September 1990) is a French rugby union player. She represented France at the 2014 Women's Rugby World Cup. She was a member of the squad that won their fourth Six Nations title in 2014.

Grassineau was also a member of the French squad to the 2013 Rugby World Cup Sevens She was selected as a member of the France women's national rugby sevens team to the 2016 Summer Olympics. She was the first woman to score a tri in the olympics since rugby returned to the games.

Grassineau won a bronze medal at the 2022 Rugby World Cup Sevens. She competed for France at the 2024 Summer Olympics.
