= Liza Burgess =

Welsh rugby union player

- Born: Liza Jane Burgess; 24 March 1964 (age 62) Newport, Wales
- Height: 180 cm (5 ft 11 in)
- Weight: 79 kg (174 lb; 12 st 6 lb)
- University: Loughborough University
- Occupation: Assistant Headteacher

Rugby union career
- Position: No. 8
Amateur team(s)
| Years | Team | Apps | (Points) |
| 1983-1987? | Loughborough | | |
| 1987?-1989? | Wasps Ladies | | |
| 1989-1999 | Saracens Women | | |
| 1999?-2006? | Clifton Ladies RFC | | |
International career
| Years | Team | Apps | (Points) |
| 1983-1987 | Great Britain | 6 | |
| 1987-2006 | Wales | 87 | |
Coaching career
- Years: Team
- 2006-: Wales (forwards)
- –: Wales under-20
- –: Gloucester-Hartpury
- 2017-: Barbarians women's team

Official website
- Official WRU Webpage

Liza Jane "Bird" Burgess (born 24 March 1964) is a former Welsh women's rugby union player who was a member of the 2018 World Rugby Hall of Fame class of inductees. Her career spanned three decades, which included participating in Wales' first-ever women's international in 1987, captaining Wales 62 times, playing in four World Cups and coaching in a further two.

== Rugby ==
Burgess' rugby career started at Loughborough University in 1983 (coached by Jim Greenwood) and continued at the Wasps after graduating. In 1986, Buress made her international debut playing for Great Britain against the Netherlands and France. She would then help form the Saracens, playing with the club for a decade and leading the side to the first treble recorded in the women's domestic game (League and Cup in 15s and the National Sevens).

After retiring from playing, Burgess has since coached the Wales women's national rugby union team forwards (and the under-20s national team) and is an assistant at the Gloucester-Hartpury in the Tyrrells Premier 15s. Burgess was also the assistant coach for the inaugural Barbarian women's team in 2017. While teaching in London, she encouraged Maggie Alphonsi to play rugby.

Burgess was the first woman to join the Welsh Rugby Union national council as a member in September 2019. Also in 2019, she was on the first panel to determine the World Rugby women's-15s player-of-the-year award with Melodie Robinson, Danielle Waterman, Will Greenwood, Lynne Cantwell, Fiona Coghlan, Gaëlle Mignot, Jillion Potter, Stephen Jones, and Karl Te Nana.
