= Lise Arricastre =

French rugby union player

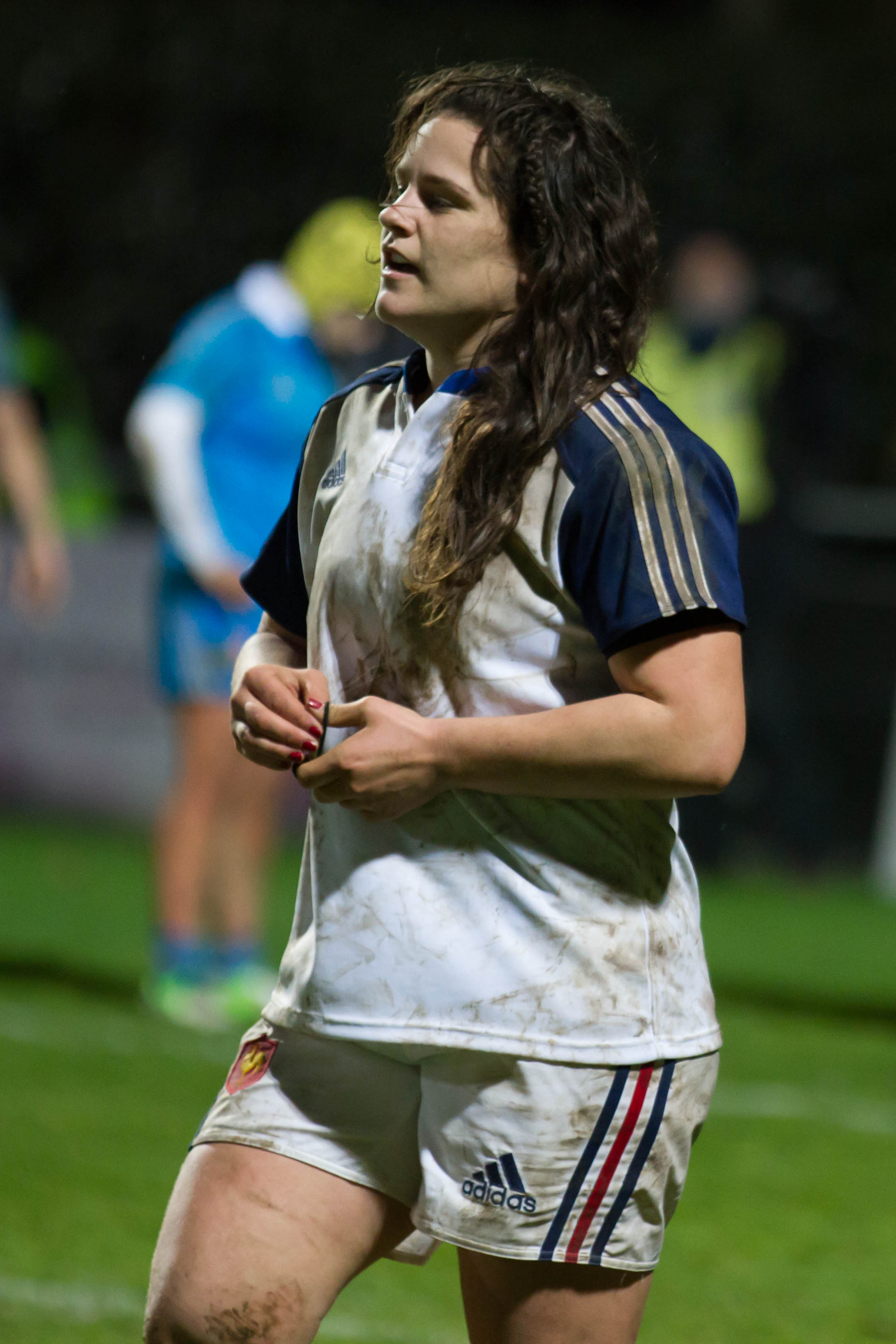
- Arricastre at the 2014 Six Nations.
- Born: 17 June 1991 (age 35)
- Height: 1.65 m (5 ft 5 in)
- Weight: 78 kg (172 lb; 12 st 4 lb)

Rugby union career
- Position: Prop
Senior career
Years	Team	Apps	(Points)
- Lons
International career
Years	Team	Apps	(Points)
- France

Lise Arricastre (born 17 June 1991) is a French rugby union player. She represented France at the 2014 Women's Rugby World Cup. She was a member of the squad that won their fourth Six Nations title in 2014.

Arricastre was in the squad that toured the United States in a successful three-test series in 2013.
