= Safi N'Diaye =

French rugby union player

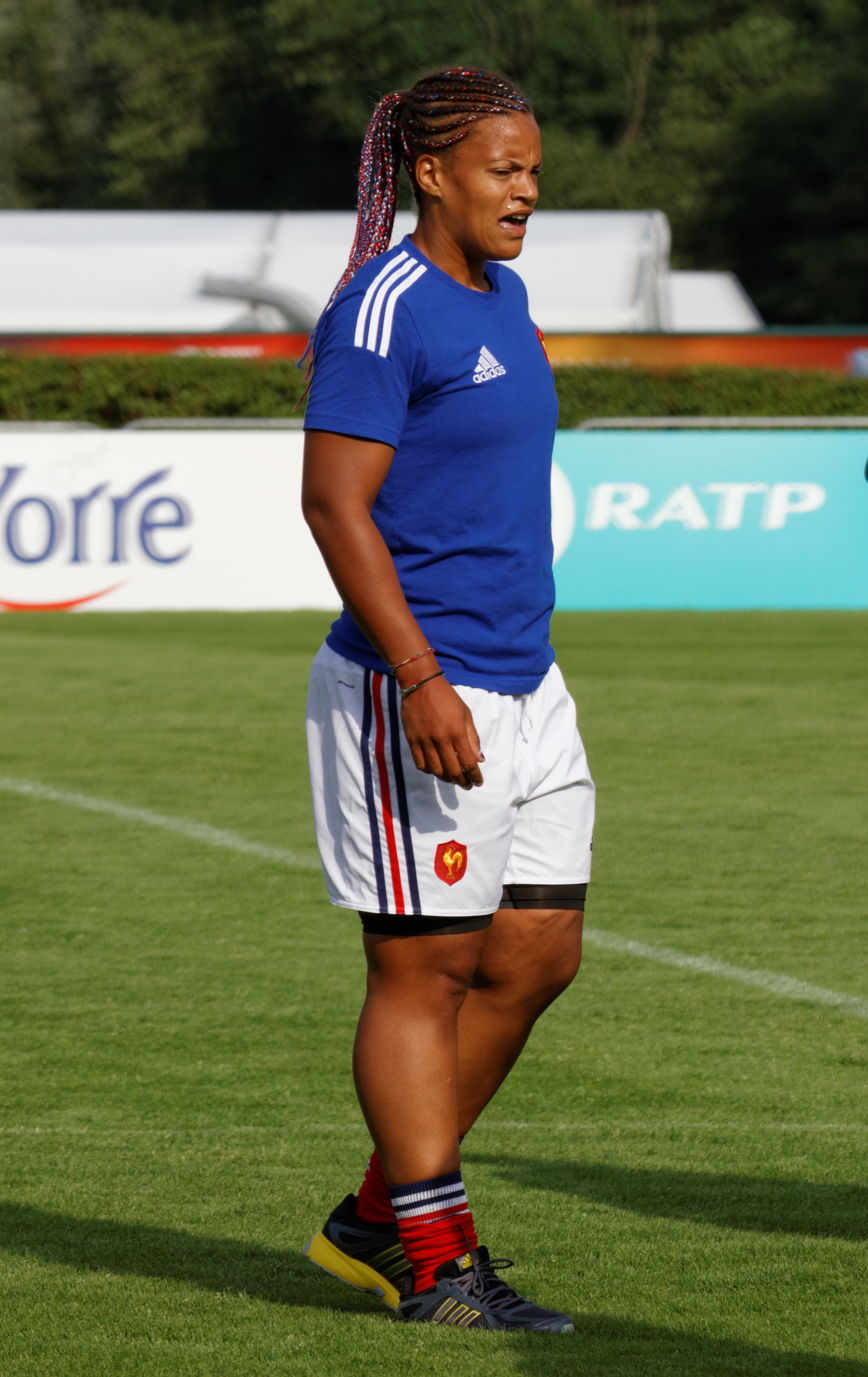
- Safi N'Diaye at the 2014 World Cup
- Born: 16 June 1988 (age 38)
- Height: 1.82 m (5 ft 11 1/2 in)
- Weight: 93 kg (205 lb; 14 st 9 lb)

Rugby union career
- Position: Loose forward
Senior career
Years	Team	Apps	(Points)
2011–Present	Montpellier		(0)
International career
Years	Team	Apps	(Points)
2012–Present	France	85	(0)

Safi N'Diaye (born 16 June 1988) is a French female rugby union player. In the domestic sport, she has won six trophies in the French top flight with Montpellier since making the switch from Castres in 2011. She made her debut for the France team in 2012. She represented France at the 2014 Women's Rugby World Cup and was named to the Dream Team. She was also a member of the squad that won their fourth Six Nations title in 2014.

N'Diaye was named in France's fifteens team for the 2021 Rugby World Cup in New Zealand.
