= Marjorie Mayans =

French rugby union player

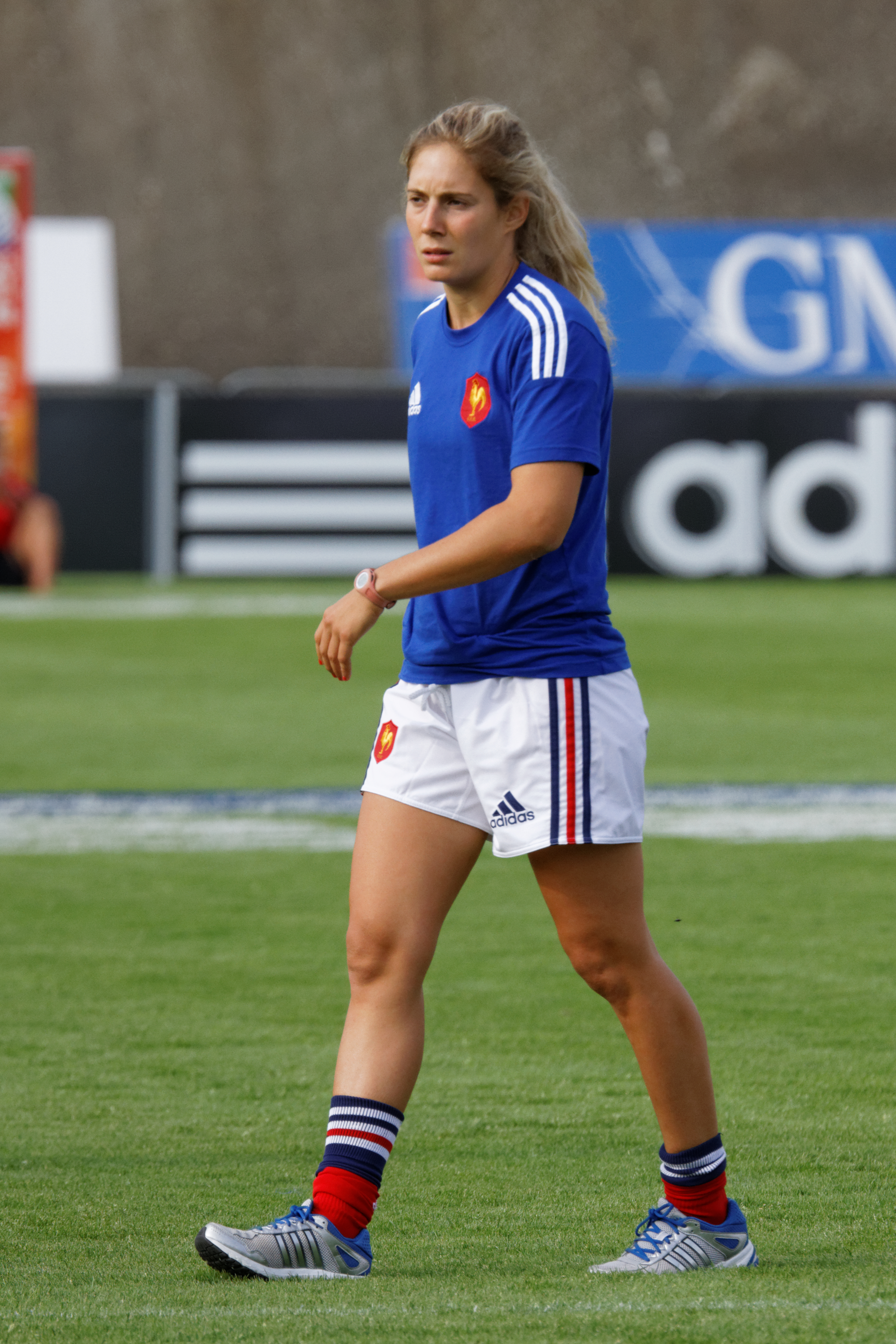
- Born: 17 November 1990 (age 35)
- Height: 1.71 m (5 ft 7 in)
- Weight: 67 kg (148 lb)

Rugby union career
- Position: Centre or Flanker
Senior career
Years	Team	Apps	(Points)
- Saint Orens
International career
Years	Team	Apps	(Points)
	France	50	
National sevens team
Years	Team		Comps
- France

Marjorie Mayans (born 17 November 1990) is a French rugby union player. She represented France at the 2014 Women's Rugby World Cup. She was a member of the squad that won their fourth Six Nations title in 2014. Mayans was also part of the French sevens team at the 2013 Rugby World Cup Sevens.

Mayans, started playing rugby aged nine. Her effective contact work and destructive presence in both defence and attack during her international career has earned her the nickname ‘Queen of the Tackle’.

Mayans was selected as a member of the France women's national rugby sevens team to the 2016 Summer Olympics. She is studying at the Toulouse 1 Capitole University.

Mayans was named in France's fifteens team for the 2021 Rugby World Cup in New Zealand.
