= Shannon Izar =

French rugby union player

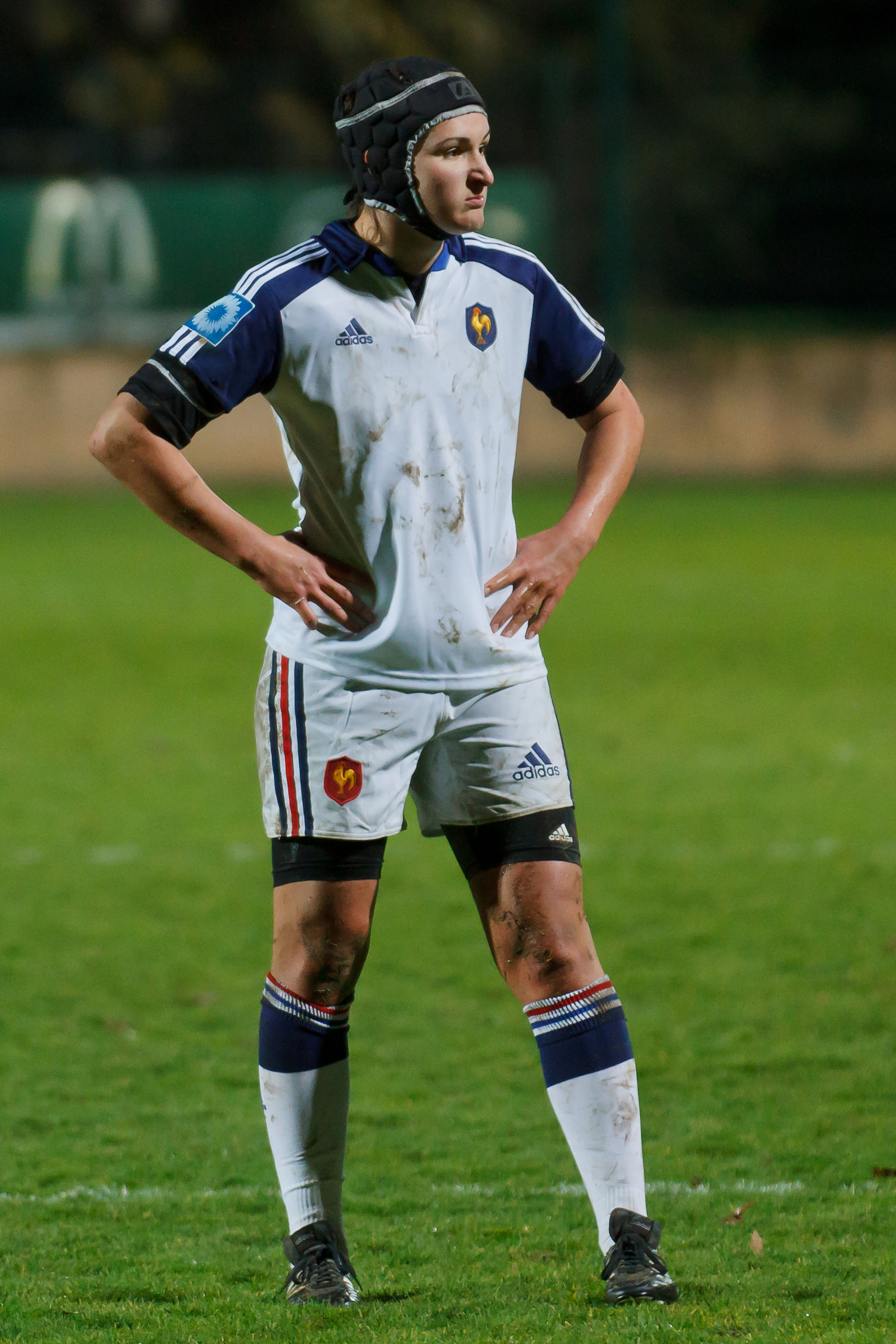
- Izar in 2014
- Full name: Shannon Tifenn Morgane Izar
- Born: 8 May 1993 (age 33) London, England, Great Britain
- Height: 1.72 m (5 ft 8 in)
- Weight: 69 kg (152 lb)

Rugby union career
- Position: Centre
Senior career
Years	Team	Apps	(Points)
2025-	Stade Villeneuvois LM		
International career
Years	Team	Apps	(Points)
- France
National sevens team
Years	Team		Comps
- France
Medal record
Women's rugby sevens
Representing France
Olympic Games
Silver medal – second place	2020 Tokyo	Team competition

Shannon Tifenn Morgane Izar (born 8 May 1993 in London) is a French rugby union player. She has represented France in both codes of the game. She played at the 2014 Women's Rugby World Cup and at the 2013 Rugby World Cup Sevens.

Izar was a member of the squad that won their fourth Six Nations title in 2014. She was selected as a member of the France women's national rugby sevens team to the 2016 Summer Olympics.
