= Melodie Robinson =

NZ international rugby union player, sports journalist & presenter

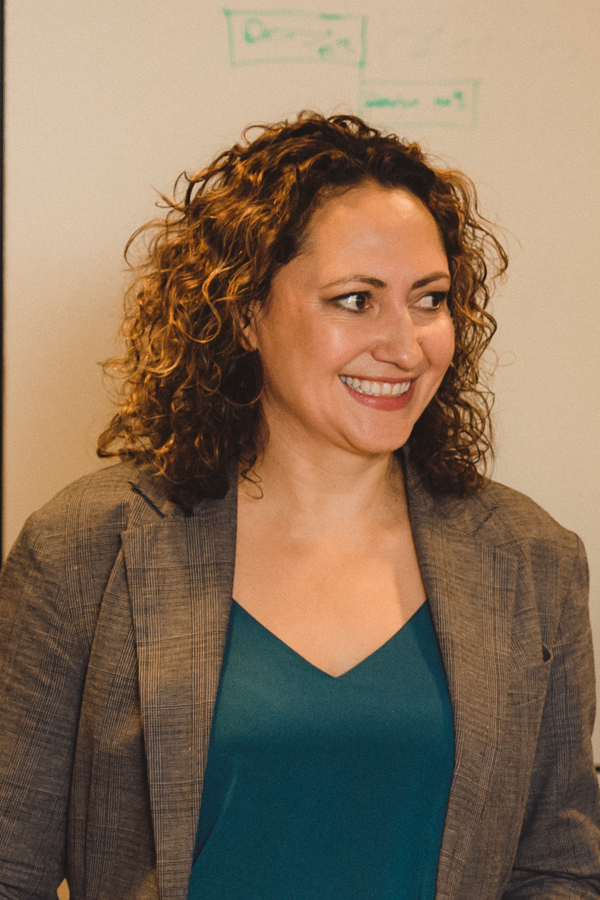
- Melodie Robinson at the 2016 U.S. Department of State's Global Sports Mentoring Program. Photo: United States Department of State and University of Tennessee Center for Sport, Peace, & Society.
- Born: 25 May 1973 (age 53) New Plymouth, New Zealand
- Height: 1.74 m (5 ft 8 1/2 in)
- Weight: 67.4 kg (149 lb; 10 st 9 lb)
- Occupation: Journalist

Rugby union career
- Position: Flanker
Provincial / State sides
Years	Team	Apps	(Points)
- Wellington
International career
Years	Team	Apps	(Points)
1996–2002	New Zealand	18	(20)
Medal record
Representing New Zealand
Women's rugby union
Rugby World Cup
Gold medal – first place	1998 Netherlands	Team competition
Gold medal – first place	2002 Spain	Team competition

Melodie Robinson (born 25 May 1973) is a New Zealand sports journalist and presenter, and former international rugby union player for the New Zealand women's national rugby union team. She played 18 tests for the New Zealand women's team, the Black Ferns, from 1996 to 2002. Robinson won two world cups in that time, playing blindside or openside flanker. She also represented New Zealand in sevens at the Hong Kong 7s and Japan 7s.

== Life ==
While playing rugby she gained a degree from the University of Otago (BA PHSE) and a journalism certificate from Wellington Polytechnic in 1996. Her first work was in radio, working at the press gallery in Wellington covering politics.

Her natural leanings towards sports led her to be the online sports producer for Xtramsn.co.nz from 1998 to 2002. While working at Xtra she produced websites like allblacks.com, teamnewzealand.com. Robinson went to Sky Sports in 2002 commentating and presenting for the Super 12 and NPC. She was the regular host of Super Rugby and ITM Cup build ups, also hosted the ANZ Championship and international netball build ups, has hosted the Halberg Awards, and is a regular on World Rugby's Women's Sevens Series as a commentator. She was also a journalist for Sky TV NZ on events like the Commonwealth Games and Netball World Cup 2015.

A former winner of the Miss Canterbury Beauty Pageant Robinson balanced her full-time role with Sky Sport with part-time study at Auckland University's Business School for her PostGrad Diploma.

In 2019, she was on the first panel to determine the World Rugby women's-15s player-of-the-year award with Danielle Waterman, Will Greenwood, Liza Burgess, Lynne Cantwell, Fiona Coghlan, Gaëlle Mignot, Jillion Potter, Stephen Jones, and Karl Te Nana. She was also on the World Rugby Men's 15s Player of the Year award voting panel.

Robinson was appointed TVNZ's new general manager, sport and events, also in 2019.

Robinson is a castaway on the 2022 series of the New Zealand reality television show Celebrity Treasure Island.
