= Karl Te Nana =

NZ rugby union & league player

- Born: Karl Solomon Te Nana; 15 July 1975 (age 51) Palmerston North, New Zealand
- Height: 193 cm (6 ft 4 in)
- Weight: 96 kg (15 st 2 lb; 212 lb)

Rugby union career
- Position: Wing
Provincial / State sides
Years	Team	Apps	(Points)
- North Harbour
Super Rugby
Years	Team	Apps	(Points)
2000	Highlanders	5	(5)
National sevens team
Years	Team		Comps
- New Zealand
Medal record
Men's rugby sevens
Representing New Zealand
Commonwealth Games
Gold medal – first place	2002 Manchester	Team competition

Karl Solomon Te Nana (born 15 July 1975) is a New Zealand former rugby union and rugby league footballer. Since retirement fom his playing career he has worked as a television rugby commentator.

A professional rugby union player, Te Nana won a gold medal as part of the New Zealand rugby sevens national team at the 2002 Commonwealth Games. He scored 113 tries for the New Zealand rugby sevens team. He was the leading try scorer during the 2000–01 Sevens Series with 42 tries. He was a member of the New Zealand squad that won the 2001 Rugby World Cup Sevens.

He played for Wellington (1996-97) and North Harbour (1999-2003) in the National Provincial Championship. Te Nana spent the 2000 season with the Otago Highlanders in Super Rugby (then known as the Super 12) playing 5 matches and in 2001 and 2002 seasons he played for the Waikato Chiefs in 7 games, scoring 2 tries.

He also played for the Point Chevalier Pirates in the Auckland Rugby League's Phelan Shield.

In 2019, he was on the first panel to determine the World Rugby women's-15s player-of-the-year award with Melodie Robinson, Danielle Waterman, Will Greenwood, Liza Burgess, Lynne Cantwell, Fiona Coghlan, Gaëlle Mignot, Jillion Potter, and Stephen Jones.

== Television ==
After retirement Te Nana has hosted a weekly rugby show on Sky TV in New Zealand called "This Given Sunday" with former All Black halfback Steve Devine. He has also been a regular world rugby commentator on the 7's World Series for both men's and woman's matches. He has also hosted, reported and commentated on All Blacks, Super Rugby, college rugby and provincial rugby for Sky TV in New Zealand.
