= Ffion Bowen =

Welsh rugby union player (born 1991)

- Born: 28 January 1991 (age 35) Brecon, Wales
- Height: 1.68 m (5.5 ft)
- Weight: 71 kg (11.2 st)

Rugby union career
- Position: Winger
- Current team: Maesteg Celtic/Ospreys
Amateur team(s)
| Years | Team | Apps | (Points) |
| – | Maesteg Celtic | | |
| – | Ospreys | | |
International career
| Years | Team | Apps | (Points) |
| 2014–present | Wales | 4 | |
- Correct as of 2 May 2016

Ffion Bowen (born 28 January 1991) is a Welsh rugby union player who plays winger for Maesteg Celtic/Ospreys and the Wales women's national rugby union team. She won her first international cap against Italy in the 2014 Women's Six Nations Championship. Outside of rugby, she works as a dental nurse.

== Rugby career ==
Bowen was born on 28 January 1991, in Brecon. As of 2016, her official Wales Rugby Union biography states that she is 1.68 metres (5.5 ft) tall, and weighs 71 kilograms (11.2 st; 157 lb). Bowen took up rugby after the netball club she played for in Neath closed. She was told about a new women's club being opened at Maesteg Celtic. After some success with Celtic, she was called up to the Ospreys.

Bowen was called up for the Wales women's national rugby union team in the 2014 Women's Six Nations Championship, as one of six uncapped players in the squad. Head coach Rhys Edwards said in an interview with the South Wales Argus after selecting the squad that Bowen had only been brought to his attention less than three weeks before. Bowen made her international debut in a match against Italy on 2 February 2014. This was less than 18 months after she first took up the sport. Prior to the game, she said "I didn't expect to get in the Ospreys let alone be selected for Wales. I’m really excited but I will have to do a lot of training."

Bowen suffered an eye injury prior to the 2016 Women's Six Nations Championship, and was replaced in the squad by Bethan Dainton. In addition to her main clubs and country, Bowen also plays for the Flamingoes, a women's beach rugby team. Outside of rugby, she works as a dental nurse.
