= Stephen Jones (journalist) =

Welsh sports journalist

- Education: Bassaleg School
- Occupation: Journalist
- Writing career
- Genre: Non-fiction
- Subject: Sports

Stephen Jones is a Welsh journalist and was a rugby correspondent for The Sunday Times since the 1970s. He no longer covers rugby for The Times. He also contributes an occasional report on others sports like cricket, football, and golf, in addition to his main topic of rugby.

In 2019, he was on the first panel to determine the World Rugby women's-15s player-of-the-year award with Melodie Robinson, Danielle Waterman, Will Greenwood, Liza Burgess, Lynne Cantwell, Fiona Coghlan, Gaëlle Mignot, Jillion Potter, and Karl Te Nana.
