= Jillion Potter =

American rugby union player

- Born: Jillion Paige Potter; June 5, 1986 (age 40); Austin, Texas, U.S.
- Education: La Cueva High School
- Alma mater: University of New Mexico
- Height: 5 ft 10 in (178 cm)
- Weight: 174 lb (79 kg)

Rugby union career
- Position(s): Flanker, Prop (7s)
National sevens team
Years	Team	Comps
2007–present	United States	22 (285; 57t)

Jillion Paige Potter (born July 5, 1986) is an American rugby union player. She was the captain of the 2016 USA Olympic women's rugby sevens team.

== Childhood ==
Jillion Potter Austin, Texas to parents Scott Potter and Vikki Vranich. She has a twin brother Paul Thomas Potter and older sister Molly Potter Grosskopf.

== Rugby career ==
She began her rugby career at the University of New Mexico in 2005. She had never played rugby before college. However she still made it onto the USA under-19 rugby team. She continued playing for the under-23 team in 2006 and the USA Rugby Women's National Team in 2007.

As a Number 8, Potter earned 21 caps, appearances, with the USA Eagles, the US national team, 15s from 2007-2014. She participated in multiple international tours, including the 2007 UK Tour (England), 2008 Nations Cup (England), 2009 Nations Cup (Canada), 2010 CanAm (Canada), and the 2014 Women's Rugby World Cup in France. She served as captain for two years and two tournaments during her Eagles career.

In 2012, Potter transitioned to sevens rugby. She played as a prop, one of two powerhouse players in the front row of a rugby team (wearing jerseys numbered 1 and 3) who anchor the scrum, lift jumpers at lineouts, and act as primary ball-carriers. From 2012-2016, she would appear roughly 60 times with the USA Eagles 7s. She won a bronze medal at the 2013 Rugby World Cup Sevens. In the 2016 Rio Olympics, she captained and competed for Team USA 7s where they landed 5th place.

She was a recipient of the inaugural Leadership Development Scholarship alongside Ada Milby (Philippines), Samantha Feausi (Hong Kong), Maha Zaoui (Tunisia), Rolande Boro (Burkina Faso), Dr. Araba "Roo" Chintoh (Canada), and Maria Thomas (Trinidad and Tobago).

In 2019, she was on the first panel to determine the World Rugby women's-15s player-of-the-year award with Melodie Robinson, Danielle Waterman, Will Greenwood, Liza Burgess, Lynne Cantwell, Fiona Coghlan, Gaëlle Mignot, Stephen Jones, and Karl Te Nana.

== Personal life ==
She met her wife Carol Fabrizio in 2011, through rugby. She loves flossing her teeth and has her wife carry dental floss with her everywhere. Potter was diagnosed with stage 3 Synovial Sarcoma cancer in August of 2014. She finished treatment in March of 2015. After more than a decade of surgeries, radiation, chemotherapy, and clinical trials, Jillion's cancer is now considered non-curative.
