= Danielle Waterman =

England international rugby union player

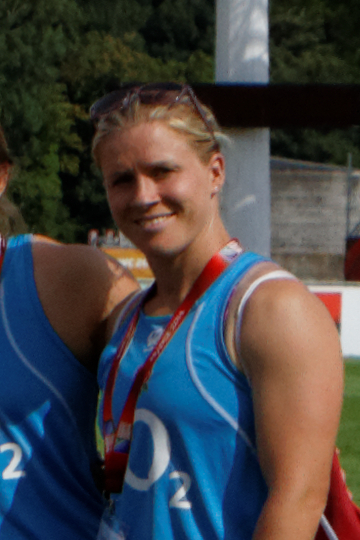
- in 2014
- Born: 20 January 1985 (age 41) Taunton, Somerset, England
- Height: 1.65 m (5 ft 5 in)
- Weight: 64 kg (141 lb)
- School: Palmerston North Girls' High School, The West Somerset Community College, Oldfield School
- University: University of Wales Institute, Cardiff
- Occupation: Professional rugby player

Rugby union career
- Position: Fullback
Senior career
Years	Team	Apps	(Points)
–	Wasps Ladies		
2014	Bristol Ladies		
2015–2020	Wasps Ladies		
International career
Years	Team	Apps	(Points)
2003–2018	England	82	(205)
- Correct as of 17 July 2016
National sevens teams
Years	Team		Comps
2009–2016	England 7s		
2016	Great Britain		
- Correct as of 17 July 2016
Medal record
Representing England
Women's rugby union
Rugby World Cup
Gold medal – first place	2014 France	Team competition
Silver medal – second place	2017 Ireland	Team competition
Silver medal – second place	2010 England	Team competition

Danielle Sian "Nolli" Waterman (born 20 January 1985) is a retired professional English rugby union, rugby sevens player and current rugby commentator. As a member of England's national rugby union team, she became a multiple Six Nations Championship winner and World Champion in 2014. She was selected for the 2017 Women's Rugby World Cup squad.

== Early life and career ==
Danielle Waterman is the daughter of Jim Waterman, who played in more than 400 games for Bath Rugby. Rugby took hold of her while Waterman's family was staying in New Zealand. At Palmerston North High School, she was one of a few girls who played rugby with the boys. She continued to do so at her first sports club, Minehead Barbarians RFC, after returning to England. She played for the South West regional U-16s squad until she was selected to the England Senior Academy at the age of 15.

== Sports career ==
On her Test debut in 2003 against Ireland, 18-year-old Danielle Waterman became the youngest woman then to represent her country. She won the award for England's Most Promising Player in 2006 and was the national team's vice captain when England won the 2012 Women's European Championship. After winning silver medals at the 2006 World Cup and the 2010 World Cup, she became World Champion at the 2014 Women's Rugby World Cup having scored a try in the final against Canada. Subsequently, Waterman was awarded Gloucestershire's Professional Sports Personality of 2014, in addition to the English team receiving the BBC Sports Personality Team of the Year Award.

Waterman holds a Level 3 Rugby Union coaching certificate. In 2014, she signed a professional contract with England 7s to prepare for the 2016 Summer Olympics. After suffering a knee injury and, later on, a broken cheekbone, Waterman was forced to pause for more than a year. She returned to the field in April 2016 at the Canada Women's Sevens scoring a try in her first appearance in the pool game against Ireland. The English national team won the series tournament with Waterman being named to the tournament's dream team.

Waterman was picked for the final selection of Great Britain's national rugby sevens team competing at the 2016 Summer Olympics. The team finished the tournament on 4th place losing against New Zealand in the semifinal and against Canada in the match for the bronze medals. She retired from international rugby in 2018 after scoring 47 tries and winning 82 caps over the course of her career.

Waterman joined Wasps Ladies FC in September 2017, playing in the inaugural Premiers 15 season in which the team finished third overall. She continued to play for Wasps Ladies until her retirement.

In 2019, she was on the first panel to determine the World Rugby women's-15s player-of-the-year award with Melodie Robinson, Will Greenwood, Liza Burgess, Lynne Cantwell, Fiona Coghlan, Gaëlle Mignot, Jillion Potter, Stephen Jones, and Karl Te Nana. As well, in 2019 she was on the World Rugby Men's Sevens Player of the Year award and World Rugby Women's Sevens Player of the Year award voting panels.

In September 2020, Waterman announced her official retirement from professional rugby.

== Commentary work ==
Waterman joined the ITV commentary team as their first female rugby commentator for the 2019 Rugby World Cup and the 2020 Six Nations Championship.

She co-hosts a podcast about women's rugby, Try Hards Podcast, with rugby broadcaster Laura-Jane Jones.

In April 2021 Waterman was part of a short documentary named Finding Her Voice.
