= Lynne Cantwell =

Irish rugby union player and sports administrator

- Born: 27 September 1981 (age 45) Dublin, Ireland
- Height: 1.6 m (5 ft 3 in)
- Weight: 65 kg (143 lb; 10 st 3 lb)

Rugby union career
- Position: Centre
Senior career
Years	Team	Apps	(Points)
200x–	Richmond Women		
Provincial / State sides
Years	Team	Apps	(Points)
19xx–2004	Munster		
2005–	Leinster		
International career
Years	Team	Apps	(Points)
2001–	Ireland	78	
National sevens team
Years	Team		Comps
2013	Ireland		

Lynne Cantwell (born 27 September 1981) is an Irish rugby union player. 2014 Women's Rugby World Cup. She is Ireland's most capped female player. She played at the 2013 Rugby World Cup Sevens.

In 2019, she was on the first panel to determine the World Rugby women's-15s player-of-the-year award with Melodie Robinson, Danielle Waterman, Will Greenwood, Liza Burgess, Fiona Coghlan, Gaëlle Mignot, Jillion Potter, Stephen Jones, and Karl Te Nana.

Cantwell has a Sports and Exercise Science degree from the University of Limerick and a Masters in Physiotherapy from Southampton University. As of 2019, Cantwell is a member of the board of Sports Ireland.

At the 2024 Summer Olympic Games, Cantwell was part of the coaching squad for the South African rugby sevens team.

In 2025, Cantwell was inducted into the World Rugby Hall of Fame, the first Irish woman to be admitted.
