= Jackie Shiels =

- Born: 1 January 1985 (age 41) Navan, County Meath
- Height: 1.63 m (5 ft 4 in)
- Weight: 69 kg (152 lb; 10 st 12 lb)

Rugby union career
- Position(s): Centre, Fullback
Senior career
| Years | Team | Apps | (Points) |
- Richmond
International career
| Years | Team | Apps | (Points) |
| | Ireland | 6 | |

Jackie Shiels (born 1 January 1985) is an Irish female rugby union player. She played at the 2010 and 2014 Women's Rugby World Cup. She made five conversions to help Ireland secure a semi-final spot at the 2014 World Cup.

Shiels is a teacher by profession and previously played Gaelic football and soccer.
