= Ilaria Arrighetti =

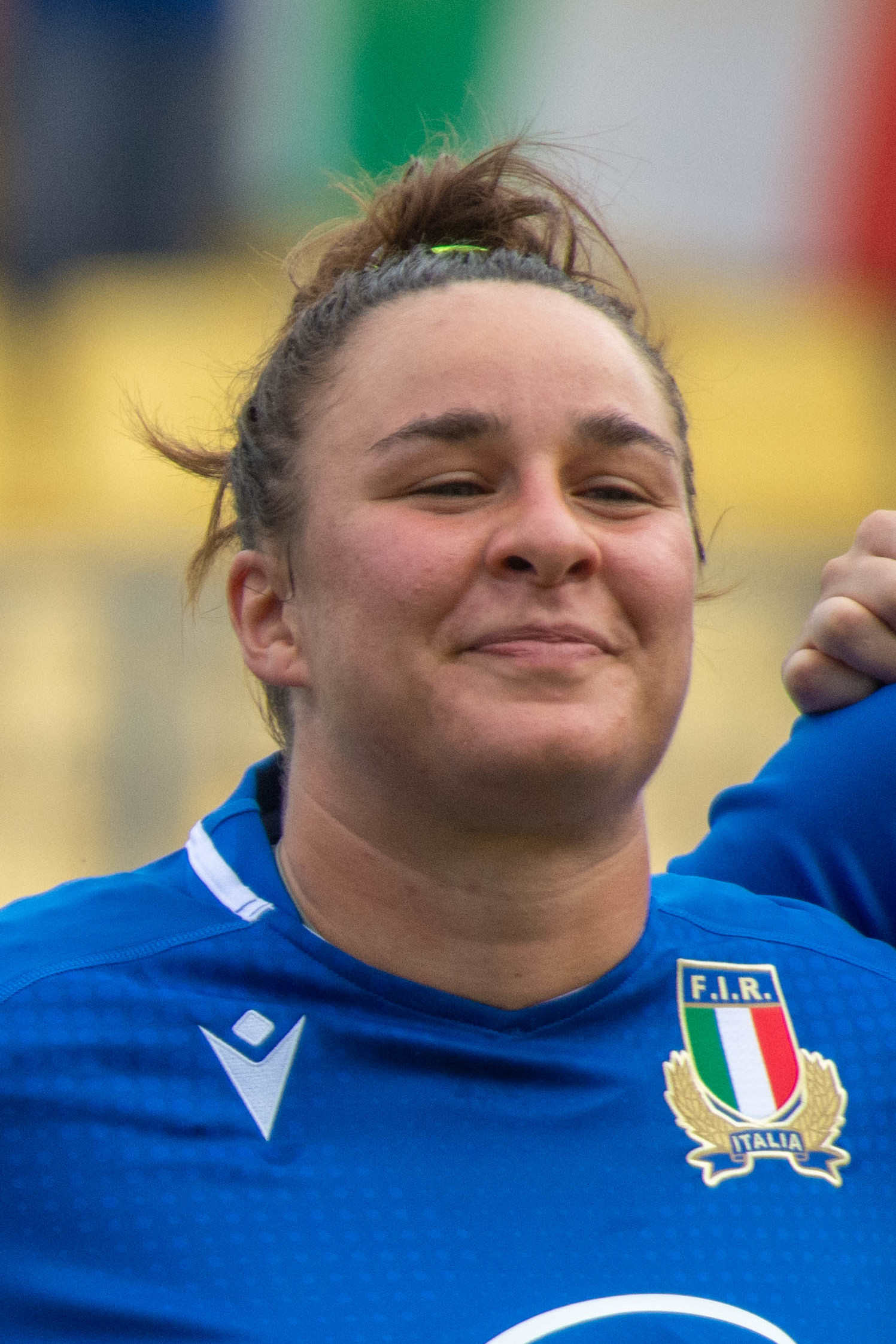
- Arrighetti in Parma for the 2021 Rugby World Cup qualifying
- Born: 2 March 1993 (age 33) Cernusco sul Naviglio, Lombardy
- Height: 173 cm (5 ft 8 in)
- Weight: 78 kg (172 lb)

Rugby union career
- Position: Back row
- Current team: Stade Rennais Rugby
Amateur team(s)
Years	Team	Apps	(Points)
2011–2015	ASD Rugby Monza 1949		(0)
2015–	Stade Rennais Rugby		(0)
International career
Years	Team	Apps	(Points)
2012–	Italy	63	(35)
- Correct as of 24 September 2025

Ilaria Arrighetti (born 2 March 1993, in Cernusco sul Naviglio) is an Italian rugby union player who plays in the back row for Stade Rennais Rugby and the Italy women's national rugby union team. She competed at the 2017, 2021 and 2025 World Cups.

== Early career ==
Ilaria Arrighetti was born on 2 March 1993, in Cernusco sul Naviglio near to the Metropolitan City of Milan, Lombardy. She began playing rugby while at secondary school, and became captain of the mixed gender under-13 rugby union team, although she was the only female on the team.

== Rugby career ==
Arrighetti made her debut for the Italy women's national rugby union team in 2012. According to her biography on the 2017 Women's Rugby World Cup website, Arrighetti is 1.73 metres (5.7 ft) tall and weighs 78 kilograms (12.3 st). At club level, she played for the women's side of ASD Rugby Monza 1949, until 2015 when she transferred to Stade Rennais Rugby in France. At the time, she did not speak any French. In Rennes, she lives with three other members of the Italian national team.

Arrighetti was selected in Italy's squad for the 2021 Rugby World Cup in New Zealand. She was named in the Italian side for the 2025 Women's Six Nations Championship.

On 11 August 2025, she was named in the Italian team to the Women's Rugby World Cup in England.
