= Porthcawl Comprehensive School =

Location
- Porthcawl, Bridgend; Wales
- Coordinates: 51.4807°N 3.7121°W

Information
- Type: Co-educational secondary comprehensive
- Local authority: Bridgend
- Age: 11 to 18
- Website: http://www.porthcawlschool.co.uk/

Porthcawl Comprehensive School, on the western side of Porthcawl town in Bridgend County Borough, has approximately 1,500 pupils, ages 11–18 and 80 teaching staff. The headteacher is Mr M Stephens. Ruth Jones and Rob Brydon attended this school. The chairperson of governing body is A. Thomas.

== See also ==
- Category:People educated at Porthcawl Comprehensive School
