= Caryl Thomas =

Welsh rugby player

- Born: 19 February 1986 (age 40)
- Height: 1.68 m (5.5 ft)
- Weight: 95 kg (15.0 st)

Rugby union career
- Position: Loosehead prop
- Current team: Worcester Warriors
International career
Years	Team	Apps	(Points)
2006–present	Wales	58	
- Correct as of 22 April 2021

Caryl Thomas (born 19 February 1986) is a Welsh Rugby Union player. She plays loosehead prop for Wales and Worcester Warriors. She represented Wales at the 2021 Women's Six Nations Championship.

== Club career ==
Thomas began her club career with Bath Rugby before moving to Bristol Bears as prop in 2019, and to Worcester Warriors in 2020.

== International career ==
Thomas made her debut for the Wales women's national rugby union team in 2006 against Italy as a loosehead prop. She then returned to the Wales squad for the 2010 World Cup campaign, and has played regularly for the team since, including the Women's Rugby World Cup in 2014 and 2017, and the Six Nations Championships in 2017, 2019 and 2021.

Thomas has earned 58 caps over the course of her career. She was selected in Wales squad for the 2021 Rugby World Cup in New Zealand.

== Personal life ==
When she's not playing rugby professionally, Thomas can still be found on the pitch, either as head coach for the University of Bath women's rugby team, or in her capacity as impact manager for The Bath Rugby Foundation.

Thomas also previously played for Bath Buccaneers hockey team.
