= Natasha Brennan =

England international rugby union player

- Born: 11 October 1986 (age 40)
- Height: 1.66 m (5 ft 5 1/2 in)
- Weight: 69 kg (152 lb; 10 st 12 lb)

Rugby union career
- Position: Wing
Senior career
Years	Team	Apps	(Points)
- Richmond
International career
Years	Team	Apps	(Points)
2014	England	2	(5)
National sevens team
Years	Team		Comps
- England

Natasha Brennan (born 11 October 1986) is an English rugby union player who represented England at the 2014 Women's Rugby World Cup. She replaced Lydia Thompson who suffered a groin injury in the warm-up ahead of England's second game against Spain.

Brennan has also played for the English women's sevens team. She scored 16 tries in only 12 games in the 2013–14 Women's Sevens World Series.
