= Fiona Coghlan =

Irish rugby union player

- Born: Fiona Coghlan; March 3, 1981 (age 45)
- Height: 1.75 m (5 ft 9 in)
- Weight: 77 kg (170 lb; 12 st 2 lb)
- University: University of Limerick
- Occupation(s): Teacher & TV Commentator & Analyst

Rugby union career
- Position: Front Row/Prop
Senior career
Years	Team	Apps	(Points)
2001–04	UL Ladies		
2001–	UL Bohemians		
2017–	Barbarians		
Provincial / State sides
Years	Team	Apps	(Points)
2002–	Leinster		
International career
Years	Team	Apps	(Points)
2003–2014	Ireland	85	

Fiona Coghlan (born March 3, 1981) is a former Ireland women's rugby union international. Coghlan represented Ireland at the 2006, 2010 and 2014 Women's Rugby World Cups. She also captained the Ireland team that won the 2013 Women's Six Nations Championship. In 2013 Coghlan was named The Irish Times / Irish Sports Council Sportswoman of the Year after captaining Ireland to their first ever Six Nations, Grand Slam and Triple Crown titles. Coghlan was a member of the first Ireland teams to defeat France, England and New Zealand. She was the Ireland captain on the latter two occasions. In addition to captaining Ireland, Coghlan also captained her club team, UL Bohemians, her provincial team, Leinster and was captain of the first ever Barbarians women's team.

== Early years and education ==
Coghlan is originally from Clontarf, Dublin. Her family supported Clontarf F.C. and attended Ireland rugby union international games. In her youth she was actively involved in various sports including tennis and horse riding. She attended Holy Faith Secondary School, Clontarf, where she played basketball and hockey, winning numerous school medals. In 2001 she began attending the University of Limerick where she completed a Bsc in Physical education and Maths teaching.

== Rugby union ==
=== UL Bohemians ===
Coghlan began playing women's rugby union while she was a student at the University of Limerick. She played for the UL Ladies team at intervarsity level, winning four cup and league titles. She also played for UL Bohemians at national level, winning eleven All Ireland Division One titles.

=== Leinster ===
Coghlan represented Leinster in the IRFU Women's Interprovincial Series. She had originally trained with Munster before making her Leinster debut in August 2002. She subsequently helped Leinster win three titles in 2005, 2011 and 2013. Coghlan captained Leinster when they won the 2011 title.

=== Barbarians ===
On 10 November 2017 Coghlan captained the Barbarians against Munster in the invitational team's first women's match which was held in Thomond Park. The Barbarians won 19–0.

=== Ireland international ===
Coghlan was included in the Ireland training squad for the 2002 Women's Rugby World Cup before she made her Six Nations debut for Ireland on 2 February 2003 against Spain. Coghlan subsequently represented Ireland at the 2006, 2010 and 2014 Women's Rugby World Cups. In 2008 she was first named Ireland captain, taking over the role permanently in 2010. During the 2009 Women's Six Nations Championship, she was a member first Ireland team to defeat France. Coghlan captained the Ireland team that won the 2013 Women's Six Nations Championship. In 2013 Ireland also achieved both a Triple Crown and Grand Slam.

In 2013 Coghlan was named The Irish Times/ Irish Sports Council Sportswoman of the Year after captaining Ireland to their first ever Six Nations, Grand Slam and Triple Crown titles.

Coghlan was also captain when Ireland defeated both England and New Zealand for the first time. On 9 February 2013 Ireland defeated England for the first time while on their way to winning the 2013 Women's Six Nations Championship. On 5 August 2014 Ireland defeated New Zealand for the first time during a 2014 Women's Rugby World Cup pool stage game. Coghlan subsequently retired as an Ireland international after captaining Ireland to fourth place in the 2014 Women's Rugby World Cup.

In 2019, she was on the first panel to determine the World Rugby women's-15s player-of-the-year award with Melodie Robinson, Danielle Waterman, Will Greenwood, Liza Burgess, Lynne Cantwell, Gaëlle Mignot, Jillion Potter, Stephen Jones, and Karl Te Nana. She was also on the voting panel for the World Rugby Men's 15 Player of the Year award.

== Gaelic football ==
Since 1997 Coghlan has intermittently played Ladies' Gaelic football for Clontarf GAA, playing as a full forward. She won an Intermediate All-Ireland medal in Club competition with Clontarf in 2018

== Teacher ==
Coghlan is working as a P.E. and Mathematics teacher at Holy Faith Clontarf Secondary School.

== Honours ==
=== Rugby union ===
Ireland

- Women's Six Nations Championship
  - Winners: 2013
- Grand Slam
  - Winners: 2013
- Triple Crown
  - Winners: 2013

Leinster

- IRFU Women's Interprovincial Series
  - Winners: 2005, 2011, 2013 : 3

UL Bohemians

- All Ireland Division One
  - Winners: : 11

UL Ladies

- Inter-Varsity League
  - Winners: : ?
- Inter-Varsity Cup
  - Winners: : ?

Individual

- The Irish Times/ Irish Sports Council Sportswoman of the Year
  - 2013
