= Manuela Furlan =

Italian rugby union player

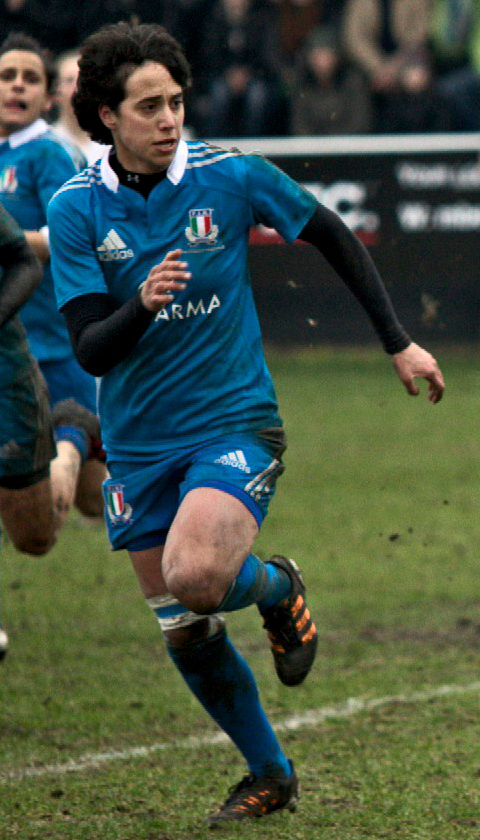
- Furlan at the 2013 Women's Six Nations game vs England
- Born: Manuela Furlan; 30 June 1988 (age 38) Trieste, Italy
- Height: 172 cm (5 ft 8 in)
- Weight: 66 kg (146 lb; 10 st 6 lb)
- Height and weight correct as of 2021-04-18

Rugby union career
- Position(s): Fullback, wing
- Current team: Villorba Rugby
Senior career
| Years | Team | Apps | (Points) |
| 2005–2016 | Red Panthers | | (0) |
| 2016–2017 | Aylesford Bulls | | (0) |
| 2017– | Villorba | | (0) |
- Correct as of 18 April 2021
International career
| Years | Team | Apps | (Points) |
| 2009–2022 | Italy | 89 | (100) |
- Correct as of 31 October 2021

Manuela Furlan (born 30 June 1988) is a former Italian rugby union player. She captained Italy and was a member of their squad for the 2021 Rugby World Cup. She retired from international rugby at the end of 2022.

== Rugby career ==
Furlan made her international debut for Italy in 2009.

Furlan was sidelined for 18 months at the start of the Women's Six Nations Championship with a torn labrum in her left shoulder. She later returned to the squad for their test against Ireland in October for the 2020 Women's Six Nations Championship.

In April 2021, in Italy's match against Scotland in the 2021 Women's Six Nations Championship, Furlan scored a hat-trick.

Furlan was one of 25 women who were contracted by the Italian Rugby Federation at the beginning of 2022. She was selected in Italy's squad for the delayed 2021 Rugby World Cup in New Zealand.

Furlan announced her retirement from international rugby at the end of 2022.
