= Rhys Edwards =

Director of rugby at Loughborough University

Rhys Edwards is a Level 4 Rugby Union coach. He is currently Director of Rugby at Loughborough University, overseeing all Rugby Union activities for both the Men's (Loughborough Students RUFC) and Women's (Lightning Rugby) programmes. Between 2010 and 2016 he coached the WRU Women National Rugby Union Squad who competed in the Six Nations Championship and World Rugby Women's World Cup in 2014.

== Early life and education ==
Edwards grew up in Laleston (near Bridgend), South Wales. He attended the Welsh-speaking primary school Ysgol Gynradd Penybont and then went on to Welsh-speaking secondary school Ysgol Gyfun Llanhari, where he completed his GCSEs and A-Levels. Edwards attended Cardiff Metropolitan University, where he completed his undergraduate degree in BSc Sports Coaching.

In 2006, Edwards completed a MDip in Performance Analysis. In 2013 he studied toward an MSc in Sports Coaching.

== Playing career ==
Rhys started playing rugby union at Ysgol Gyfun Llnahari. His primary position was Outside Half, but has also played Full Back and Wing. In 1999 he signed for Bridgend Ravens. He later played for Bedwas RFC in the Welsh Rugby Union Premiership. Edwards suffered a serious arm fracture in 2004 which required numerous surgeries, which unfortunately led to him having to retire 2007.

== Coaching career ==
Following his playing career, Edwards worked as a physical education teacher at Caldicot School. During this time Edwards worked for the Cardiff Blues as Head Coach of their U16 Academy Pathway team. His first senior coaching role was Head Coach of Caerphilly RFC in 2007. He was appointed Head Coach of Beddau in February 2010, and served until early 2013.

Edwards was appointed as Attack Coach for the Welsh Rugby Union Women's Team for the 2011 Six Nations campaign, before being stepping in as Head Coach for the final two games. Following that Six Nations campaign Edwards was appointed as the full-time Head Coach overseeing a further 6 Six Nations Championships. During this period, Edwards re-structured the Women's programme at the WRU, introducing a Sevens Programme and a U18s Pathway, which produced numerous players including Wales' only rugby union Olympian Jasmine Joyce. Edwards' role developed over his tenure and in 2015 became the Performance Lead for Women's Rugby for both the XVs and VIIs across all women's age grade and senior pathways.

In May 2016 Edwards became the skills coach for Rotherham Titans, in the RFU Championship, working under the guidance of Justin Burnell, the former Cardiff Blues Head Coach. During this period Edwards had responsibility for delivering both Attack and Defence.

In June 2017, Edwards moved to Loughborough University as Head of Women's Rugby, to establish the new Lightning Rugby Franchise that would compete in the new RFU funded Tyrrells Premier 15s competition. This league has quickly established itself as the best domestic league in the world.

In August 2019 Edwards succeeded Alan Buzza as the Director of Rugby at Loughborough University, to oversee the strategic delivery of the Rugby Union programme.

== Personal life ==
Rhys is married and has 3 children, and lives in Leicestershire.
