= 2013 Women's Six Nations Championship =

- Date: February 2013 – March 2013
- Countries: England; France; Ireland; Italy; Scotland; Wales

Tournament statistics
- Champions: Ireland (1st title)
- Grand Slam: Ireland (1st title)
- Triple Crown: Ireland (1st title)
- Matches played: 15
- Tries scored: 73 (4.87 per match)
- Top point scorer: (Ireland) Niamh Briggs (43)
- Top try scorer: (Ireland) Alison Miller (5)
- Official website: Official website

The 2013 Women's Six Nations Championship, also known as the 2013 RBS Women's Six Nations, due to the tournament being sponsored by the Royal Bank of Scotland, was the 12th series of the annual women's rugby union competition. Matches were held in February and March 2013, on the same weekends as the men's tournament.

Ireland won their first championship, winning both a Triple Crown and a Grand Slam at the same time. In their opening match of the campaign, Ireland beat Wales 12–10. Then on 9 February 2013 they defeated England for the first time. Alison Miller scored a hat-trick of tries as Ireland won 25–0. On 23 February 2013 they clinched their first Triple Crown with a 30–3 win against Scotland. On 8 March 2013 Ireland effectively won the championship after they defeated France 15–10. It was confirmed the following day after Italy failed to defeat England. Ireland eventually finished four points clear of runners-up France. Ireland secured the Grand Slam with a 6–3 away win against Italy on Saint Patrick's Day. Two penalties from Niamh Briggs gave Ireland their fifth win in a row.

Italy's defence was one of the revelations of the tournament - aside from the first half against England. This was by far their best ever Six Nations. Injuries to key players at the start of the tournament hampered France's challenge, but they were in magnificent form at home, won for the first time at Twickenham, and lost only narrowly in Italy and Ireland. Wales would also have been broadly content with their performance, with narrow defeats to Ireland and England - but wins over Italy and Scotland ensured World Cup qualification, which was their main aim. Scotland, on the other hand, suffered some horrendous defeats in a very disappointing campaign where they scored no tries and only three points. As for England, like 2009, the vast majority of their leading players were left out of the Six Nations squad to prepare for the forthcoming Sevens World Cup taking place in June in Russia, so they used the Sevens World Series as a warm-up for that event. Consequently, they had a largely inexperienced squad with only 3 players remaining from the successful series win over New Zealand in the autumn of 2012.

== Table ==
Position	Nation	Games				Points				Table points
Position	Nation	Played	Won	Drawn	Lost	For	Against	Difference	Tries	Table points
1	Ireland	5	5	0	0	88	26	+62	12	10
2	France	5	3	0	2	160	48	+112	24	6
3	England	5	3	0	2	150	71	+79	23	6
4	Wales	5	2	0	3	55	79	–24	7	4
5	Italy	5	2	0	3	39	68	–29	2	4
6	Scotland	5	0	0	5	3	203	–200	0	0

== Fixtures and results ==
=== Week 1 ===
2 February 2013

Italy	13 – 12	France
Try: Flavia Severin 40'; Con: Veronica Schiavon 40'; Pens: Veronica Schiavon 11', 80'+3'		Tries: Jade Le Pesq 20'; Gaëlle Mignot 45'; Con: Jessy Trémoulière 20'

Stadio Giulio e Silvio Pagani, Rovato, Brescia
Referee: Claire Hodnett (England)

ITALY:
FB	15	Manuela Furlan
RW	14	Michela Sillari
OC	13	Maria Grazia Cioffi
IC	12	Paola Zangirolami
LW	11	Maria Diletta Veronese	(substituted off) 70'
FH	10	Veronica Schiavon
SH	9	Sara Barattin
N8	8	Flavia Severin
OF	7	Silvia Gaudino (C)
BF	6	Michela Este
RL	5	Alice Trevisan
LL	4	Cristina Molic	(substituted off) 76'
TP	3	Lucia Gai	(substituted off) 70'
HK	2	Sara Zanon	(substituted off) 70'
LP	1	Melissa Bettoni
Replacements:
HK	16	Debora Ballarini
PR	17	Awa Coulibaly	(substituted on) 70'
PR	18	Marta Ferrari	(substituted on) 70'
LK	19	Cecilia Zublena	(substituted on) 76'
FL	20	Ilaria Arrighetti
SH	21	Vanessa Chindamo
FH	22	Michela Tondinelli
WG	23	Chiara Castellarin	(substituted on) 70'
Coach:
(Italy) Andrea Di Giandomenico

FRANCE:
FB	15	Audrey Parra	(substituted off) 41'
RW	14	Jade Le Pesq
OC	13	Marjorie Mayans
IC	12	Élodie Poublan	(substituted off) 74'
LW	11	Caroline Ladagnous
FH	10	Jessy Trémoulière	(substituted off) 52'
SH	9	Marie-Alice Yahé (C)
N8	8	Safi N'Diaye	(substituted off) 70'
OF	7	Laëtitia Grand
BF	6	Coumba Diallo
RL	5	Marine De Nadaï
LL	4	Sandra Rabier	(substituted off) 74'
TP	3	Lisa Arricastre	(substituted off) 52'
HK	2	Gaëlle Mignot	(substituted off) 52'
LP	1	Hélène Ezanno	(substituted off) 11'
Replacements:
HK	16	Laëtitia Salles	(substituted on) 52'
PR	17	Julie Duval	(substituted on) 11'
PR	18	Elodie Portaries	(substituted on) 52'
LK	19	Lénaïg Corson	(substituted on) 74'
FL	20	Manon André	(substituted on) 70'
FH	21	Sandrine Agricole	(substituted on) 52'
CE	22	Lucille Godiveau	(substituted on) 74'
WG	23	Elodie Guiglion	(substituted on) 41'
Coach:
(France) Christian Galonnier

Assistant referees:
Barbara Guastini (Italy)
Monia Salvini (Italy)
Assessor:
Valeria Ballardini (Italy)

2 February 2013

England	76 - 0	Scotland
Tries: Sarah Hunter 19', 70'; Hannah Gallagher 29'; Amber Reed 35'; Kay Wilson 40'; Ceri Large 44', 55'; Abigail Chamberlain 47', 50'; Sally Tuson 52', 75'; Rochelle Clark 67'; Cons: Amber Reed 29', 35', 44', 47', 52', 55', 67', 75'

Molesey Road, Esher, Surrey
Referee: Christine Bigaran (France)

ENGLAND:
FB	15	Lauren Cattell	(substituted off) 62'
RW	14	Lydia Thompson	(substituted off) 46'
OC	13	Abigail Chamberlain
IC	12	Amber Reed
LW	11	Kay Wilson
FH	10	Ceri Large
SH	9	Georgina Gulliver	(substituted off) 41'
N8	8	Sarah Hunter (C)
OF	7	Hannah Gallagher	(substituted off) 56'
BF	6	Joanna McGilchrist
RL	5	Emily Braund	(substituted off) 41'
LL	4	Tamara Taylor
TP	3	Rosemarie Crowley	(substituted off) 56'
HK	2	Emma Croker	(substituted off) 50'
LP	1	Kate Newton	(substituted off) 56'
Replacements:
HK	16	Victoria Fleetwood	(substituted on) 50'
PR	17	Laura Keates	(substituted on) 56'
PR	18	Rochelle Clark	(substituted on) 56'
LK	19	Rebecca Essex	(substituted on) 41'
FL	20	Harriet Millar-Mills	(substituted on) 56'
SH	21	La Toya Mason	(substituted on) 41'
CE	22	Sally Tuson	(substituted on) 46'
WG	23	Fiona Pocock	(substituted on) 62'
Coach:
(England) Gary Street

SCOTLAND:
FB	15	Steph Johnston
RW	14	Lauren Harris	(substituted off) 74'
OC	13	Annabel Sergeant
IC	12	Lisa Ritchie	(substituted off) 68'
LW	11	Megan Gaffney
FH	10	Tanya Griffith
SH	9	Louise Dalgliesh	(substituted off) 51'
N8	8	Susie Brown (C)
OF	7	Tess Forsberg
BF	6	Mary Lafaiki	(substituted off) 68'
RL	5	Bridget Millar-Mills	(substituted off) 51'
LL	4	Lindsay Wheeler
TP	3	Tracy Balmer	(substituted off) 41'
HK	2	Sarah Quick	(substituted off) 61'
LP	1	Heather Lockhart	(substituted off) 68'
Replacements:
PR	16	Beth Dickens	(substituted on) 41'
PR	17	Suzanne McKerlie-Hex	(substituted on) 68'
HK	18	Lindsey Smith	(substituted on) 61'
LK	19	Rebecca Parker	(substituted on) 51'
FL	20	Jade Konkel	(substituted on) 68'
SH	21	Sarah Law	(substituted on) 51'
CE	22	Leanne Neary	(substituted on) 68'
WG	23	Laura Steven	(substituted on) 74'
Coach:
(Scotland) Karen Findlay

Assistant referees:
Sarah Cox (England)
Simon Bourne (England)
Assessor:
David Warren (England)

3 February 2013

Wales	10 - 12	Ireland
Try: Rosie Fletcher 38'; Con: Elinor Snowsill 38'; Pen: Laura Prosser 69'		Tries: Sophie Spence 22'; Gillian Bourke 75'; Con: Niamh Briggs 22'

Talbot Athletic Ground, Port Talbot, West Glamorgan
Referee: Claire Daniels (England)

WALES:
FB	15	Rosie Fletcher
RW	14	Caryl James	(substituted off) 76'
OC	13	Elen Evans
IC	12	Rebecca De Filippo
LW	11	Philippa Tuttiett	(substituted off) 76'
FH	10	Elinor Snowsill
SH	9	Amy Day	(substituted off) 55'
N8	8	Rachel Taylor (C)	(substituted off) 71'
OF	7	Sioned Harries
BF	6	Catrina Nicholas
RL	5	Shona Powell Hughes
LL	4	Gemma Hallett
TP	3	Catrin Edwards	(substituted off) 41'
HK	2	Lowri Harries	(substituted on) 76'
LP	1	Megan York	(substituted off) 66'
Replacements:
HK	16	Carys Phillips	(substituted on) 76'
PR	17	Bethan Howell	(substituted on) 41'
PR	18	Jenny Davies	(substituted on) 66'
LK	19	Nia Davies	(substituted on) 71'
N8	20	Vicky Owens
SH	21	Laura Prosser	(substituted on) 55'
FB	22	Dyddgu Hywel	(substituted on) 76'
WG	23	Rafiuke Taylor	(substituted on) 76'
Coach:
(Wales) Rhys Edwards

IRELAND:
FB	15	Niamh Briggs
RW	14	Niamh Kavanagh	(substituted off) 54'
OC	13	Grace Davitt	(substituted off) 62'
IC	12	Jennifer Murphy
LW	11	Alison Miller
FH	10	Lynne Cantwell
SH	9	Larissa Muldoon
N8	8	Joy Neville
OF	7	Claire Molloy
BF	6	Laura Guest	(substituted off) 62'
RL	5	Marie Louise Reilly
LL	4	Sophie Spence	(yellow card) 28'
TP	3	Ailis Egan
HK	2	Gillian Bourke	(substituted off) 64' (substituted on) 70' (substituted off) 79'
LP	1	Fiona Coghlan (C)
Replacements:
HK	16	Stacey-Lea Kennedy	(substituted on) 64' (yellow card) 69'
PR	17	Fiona Hayes
PR	18	Lauren Day
LK	19	Heather O’Brien
FL	20	Siobhan Fleming	(substituted on) 62'
SH	21	Amy Davis
CE	22	Nora Stapleton	(substituted on) 62'
WG	23	Ashleigh Baxter	(substituted on) 54'
Coach:
(Republic of Ireland) Philip Doyle

Assistant referees:
Kelvin Shorte (Wales)
Peter Evans (Wales)
Assessor:
Vernon Brown (Wales)

=== Week 2 ===
8 February 2013

France	32 - 0	Wales
Tries: Jessy Trémoulière 8', 18'; Caroline Ladagnous 57'; Laëtitia Salles 74'; Cons: Jessy Trémoulière 8', 18'; Sandrine Agricole 57'; Pens: Jessy Trémoulière 3', 33'

Stadium Marcel Levindrey, Laon, Aisne
Referee: Federica Guerzoni (Italy)

FRANCE:
FB	15	Caroline Ladagnous
RW	14	Jade Le Pesq	(substituted off) 53'
OC	13	Marjorie Mayans	(substituted off) 53'
IC	12	Lucille Godiveau
LW	11	Elodie Guiglion
FH	10	Jessy Trémoulière	(substituted off) 44'
SH	9	Marie-Alice Yahé (C)
N8	8	Laëtitia Grand	(substituted off) 48'
OF	7	Manon André
BF	6	Coumba Diallo
RL	5	Marine De Nadaï	(substituted off) 63'
LL	4	Sandra Rabier
TP	3	Elodie Portaries	(substituted off) 63'
HK	2	Gaëlle Mignot	(substituted off) 41'
LP	1	Aurélie Vernhet	(substituted off) 65'
Replacements:
HK	16	Laëtitia Salles	(substituted on) 41'
PR	17	Julie Duval	(substituted on) 63'
PR	18	Assa Koïta	(substituted on) 65'
LK	19	Lénaïg Corson	(substituted on) 63'
FL	20	Safi N'Diaye	(substituted on) 48'
FH	21	Sandrine Agricole	(substituted on) 44'
CE	22	Élodie Poublan	(substituted on) 53'
WG	23	Audrey Parra	(substituted on) 53'
Coach:
(France) Christian Galonnier

WALES:
FB	15	Dyddgu Hywel	(substituted off) 63'
RW	14	Caryl James
OC	13	Elen Evans
IC	12	Rebecca De Filippo
LW	11	Philippa Tuttiett	(substituted off) 63'
FH	10	Elinor Snowsill
SH	9	Amy Day	(substituted off) 53'
N8	8	Vicky Owens	(substituted off) 41'
OF	7	Sioned Harries	(yellow card) 11' (substituted off) 67'
BF	6	Nia Davies
RL	5	Shona Powell Hughes
LL	4	Gemma Hallett (C)	(yellow card) 55'
TP	3	Catrin Edwards	(substituted off) 63'
HK	2	Lowri Harries	(substituted off) 67'
LP	1	Megan York	(substituted off) 41'
Replacements:
HK	16	Carys Phillips	(substituted on) 67'
PR	17	Bethan Howell	(substituted on) 63'
PR	18	Jenny Davies	(substituted on) 41'
N8	19	Rachel Taylor	(substituted on) 41'
FL	20	Delyth Davies	(substituted on) 67'
SH	21	Laura Prosser	(substituted on) 53' (yellow card) 72'
FB	22	Leila Johns	(substituted on) 63'
WG	23	Rafiuke Taylor	(substituted on) 63'
Coach:
(Wales) Rhys Edwards

Assistant referees:
n/a
n/a
Assessor:
n/a

9 February 2013

Ireland	25 - 0	England
Tries: Alison Miller 7', 27', 38'; Niamh Briggs 45'; Con: Niamh Briggs 38'; Pen: Niamh Briggs 12'

Archerstown Road, Ashbourne, Leinster
Referee: Andrea Spadoni (Italy)

IRELAND:
FB	15	Niamh Briggs
RW	14	Ashleigh Baxter	(substituted off) 63'
OC	13	Lynne Cantwell
IC	12	Jennifer Murphy	(substituted off) 69'
LW	11	Alison Miller
FH	10	Nora Stapleton
SH	9	Larissa Muldoon	(substituted off) 63'
N8	8	Joy Neville
OF	7	Claire Molloy	(substituted off) 74'
BF	6	Siobhan Fleming
RL	5	Marie Louise Reilly
LL	4	Sophie Spence	(substituted off) 73'
TP	3	Ailis Egan	(substituted off) 73'
HK	2	Gillian Bourke	(substituted off) 63'
LP	1	Fiona Coghlan (C)	(substituted off) 73'
Replacements:
HK	16	Stacey-Lea Kennedy	(substituted on) 63'
PR	17	Fiona Hayes	(substituted on) 73'
PR	18	Lauren Day	(substituted on) 73'
LK	19	Leigh Dargan	(substituted on) 73'
FL	20	Laura Guest	(substituted on) 74'
SH	21	Amy Davis	(substituted on) 63'
CE	22	Grace Davitt	(substituted on) 69'
WG	23	Niamh Kavanagh	(substituted on) 63'
Coach:
(Republic of Ireland) Philip Doyle

ENGLAND:
FB	15	Kay Wilson	(substituted off) 48'
RW	14	Francesca Matthews	(substituted off) 58'
OC	13	Abigail Chamberlain
IC	12	Amber Reed
LW	11	Sally Tuson
FH	10	Ceri Large
SH	9	La Toya Mason	(substituted off) 68'
N8	8	Sarah Hunter (C)
OF	7	Hannah Gallagher
BF	6	Joanna McGilchrist	(substituted off) 42' (substituted on) 52' (substituted off) 58'
RL	5	Tamara Taylor
LL	4	Rowena Burnfield	(substituted off) 48'
TP	3	Sophie Hemming	(substituted off) 53'
HK	2	Victoria Fleetwood	(substituted off) 53'
LP	1	Rochelle Clark	(yellow card) 42'
Replacements:
HK	16	Emma Croker	(substituted on) 53'
PR	17	Laura Keates	(substituted on) 53'
PR	18	Rosemarie Crowley	(substituted on) 42' (substituted off) 52'
LK	19	Rebecca Essex	(substituted on) 48'
FL	20	Harriet Millar-Mills	(substituted on) 58'
SH	21	Georgina Gulliver	(substituted on) 68'
CE	22	Lauren Cattell	(substituted on) 48'
WG	23	Fiona Pocock	(substituted on) 58'
Coach:
(England) Gary Street

Assistant referees:
Helen O'Reilly (Ireland)
Edward Kenny (Ireland)
Assessor:
Michael Carroll (Ireland)

10 February 2013

Scotland	0 - 8	Italy
		Try: Sara Barattin 48'; Pen: Veronica Schiavon 20'

Mayfield Playing Fields, Dundee
Referee: Sherry Trumbull (Canada)

SCOTLAND:
FB	15	Steph Johnston
RW	14	Lauren Harris	(substituted off) 41'
OC	13	Annabel Sergeant
IC	12	Lisa Ritchie	(substituted off) 76'
LW	11	Megan Gaffney
FH	10	Tanya Griffith
SH	9	Louise Dalgliesh	(substituted off) 63'
N8	8	Susie Brown (C)
OF	7	Tess Forsberg
BF	6	Jade Konkel	(substituted off) 63'
RL	5	Bridget Millar-Mills	(substituted off) 70'
LL	4	Lindsay Wheeler
TP	3	Tracy Balmer	(substituted off) 51'
HK	2	Sarah Quick	(substituted off) 63'
LP	1	Heather Lockhart	(substituted off) 70'
Replacements:
PR	16	Beth Dickens	(substituted on) 51'
PR	17	Suzanne McKerlie-Hex	(substituted on) 70'
HK	18	Nikki McLeod	(substituted on) 63'
LK	19	Rebecca Parker	(substituted on) 70'
FL	20	Mary Lafaiki	(substituted on) 63'
SH	21	Sarah Law	(substituted on) 63'
CE	22	Leanne Neary	(substituted on) 76'
WG	23	Laura Steven	(substituted on) 41'
Coach:
(Scotland) Karen Findlay

ITALY:
FB	15	Manuela Furlan
RW	14	Michela Sillari
OC	13	Maria Grazia Cioffi
IC	12	Paola Zangirolami
LW	11	Chiara Castellarin
FH	10	Veronica Schiavon
SH	9	Sara Barattin
N8	8	Flavia Severin	(substituted off) 76'
OF	7	Silvia Gaudino (C)
BF	6	Michela Este
RL	5	Alice Trevisan
LL	4	Cristina Molic
TP	3	Lucia Gai
HK	2	Melissa Bettoni
LP	1	Awa Coulibaly
Replacements:
HK	16	Debora Ballarini
PR	17	Sara Zanon
PR	18	Marta Ferrari
LK	19	Ilaria Arrighetti	(substituted on) 76'
FL	20	Giuliana Campanella
SH	21	Vanessa Chindamo
FH	22	Michela Tondinelli
WG	23	Sofia Stefan
Coach:
(Italy) Andrea Di Giandomenico

Assistant referees:
n/a
n/a
Assessor:
n/a

=== Week 3 ===
23 February 2013

Scotland	3 – 30	Ireland
Pen: Lisa Ritchie 15'		Tries: Alison Miller 27', 62'; Siobhan Fleming 75'; Niamh Briggs 78'; Cons: Niamh Briggs 62', 75'; Pens: Niamh Briggs 22', 57'

New Hawthornden Stadium, Bonnyrigg, Midlothian
Referee: Simon Rees (Wales)

SCOTLAND:
FB	15	Steph Johnston
RW	14	Annabel Sergeant
OC	13	Sarah Dixon
IC	12	Lisa Ritchie	(substituted off) ??'
LW	11	Megan Gaffney
FH	10	Tanya Griffith	(yellow card) 56'
SH	9	Louise Dalgliesh	(substituted off) ??'
N8	8	Susie Brown (C)
OF	7	Tess Forsberg
BF	6	Jade Konkel	(substituted off) ??'
RL	5	Rebecca Parker	(substituted off) ??'
LL	4	Lindsay Wheeler
TP	3	Tracy Balmer	(substituted off) ??'
HK	2	Sarah Quick	(substituted off) ??'
LP	1	Heather Lockhart	(substituted off) ??'
Replacements:
PR	16	Beth Dickens	(substituted on) ??'
PR	17	Suzanne McKerlie-Hex	(substituted on) ??'
HK	18	Nikki McLeod	(substituted on) ??'
LK	19	Bridget Millar-Mills	(substituted on) ??'
FL	20	Kelly Shields	(substituted on) ??'
SH	21	Sarah Law	(substituted on) ??'
CE	22	Laura Steven
CE	23	Leanne Neary	(substituted on) ??'
Coach:
(Scotland) Karen Findlay

IRELAND:
FB	15	Niamh Briggs
RW	14	Ashleigh Baxter	(substituted off) 64'
OC	13	Lynne Cantwell
IC	12	Jennifer Murphy
LW	11	Alison Miller
FH	10	Nora Stapleton
SH	9	Larissa Muldoon	(substituted off) 64'
N8	8	Joy Neville
OF	7	Claire Molloy	(substituted off) 70'
BF	6	Siobhan Fleming
RL	5	Marie Louise Reilly
LL	4	Sophie Spence	(substituted off) 76'
TP	3	Ailis Egan	(substituted off) 76'
HK	2	Gillian Bourke	(substituted off) 64'
LP	1	Fiona Coghlan (C)	(substituted off) 76'
Replacements:
HK	16	Stacey-Lea Kennedy	(substituted on) 64'
PR	17	Fiona Hayes	(substituted on) 76'
PR	18	Lauren Day	(substituted on) 76'
LK	19	Leigh Dargan	(substituted on) 76'
FL	20	Laura Guest	(substituted on) 70'
SH	21	Amy Davis	(substituted on) 64'
CE	22	Grace Davitt
WG	23	Niamh Kavanagh	(substituted on) 64'
Coach:
(Republic of Ireland) Philip Doyle

Assistant referees:
Alex Pratt (Scotland)
Brian Darling (Scotland)
Assessor:
n/a

23 February 2013

England	20 – 30	France
Tries: Kay Wilson 17'; Hannah Gallagher 76'; Cons: Amber Reed 17', 76'; Pens: Amber Reed 32', 69'		Tries: Elodie Guiglion 11'; Lucille Godiveau 30'; Safi N'Diaye 35'; Christelle Chobet 45'; Caroline Ladagnous 74'; Con: Sandrine Agricole 45'; Pen: Sandrine Agricole 25'

Twickenham Stadium, London
Referee: Cammy Rudkin (Scotland)

ENGLAND:
FB	15	Lauren Cattell
RW	14	Kay Wilson	(substituted off) 62'
OC	13	Abigail Chamberlain
IC	12	Amber Reed
LW	11	Sally Tuson
FH	10	Ceri Large	(substituted off) 41'
SH	9	La Toya Mason	(substituted off) 55'
N8	8	Sarah Hunter (C)
OF	7	Hannah Gallagher
BF	6	Joanna McGilchrist	(substituted off) 62'
RL	5	Tamara Taylor	(substituted off) 55'
LL	4	Rebecca Essex
TP	3	Sophie Hemming	(substituted off) 51'
HK	2	Emma Croker	(substituted off) 47'
LP	1	Rochelle Clark	(substituted off) 51'
Replacements:
HK	16	Victoria Fleetwood	(substituted on) 47'
PR	17	Laura Keates	(substituted on) 51'
PR	18	Rosemarie Crowley	(substituted on) 51'
LK	19	Rowena Burnfield	(substituted on) 55'
FL	20	Harriet Millar-Mills	(substituted on) 62'
SH	21	Georgina Gulliver	(substituted on) 55'
FH	22	Katy McLean	(substituted on) 41'
WG	23	Emily Scott	(substituted on) 62'
Coach:
(England) Gary Street

FRANCE:
FB	15	Caroline Ladagnous
RW	14	Jade Le Pesq	(substituted off) 71'
OC	13	Élodie Poublan	(substituted off) 33'
IC	12	Lucille Godiveau
LW	11	Elodie Guiglion
FH	10	Sandrine Agricole	(substituted off) 68'
SH	9	Marie-Alice Yahé (C)
N8	8	Safi N'Diaye	(yellow card) 67' (substituted off) 77'
OF	7	Laëtitia Grand
BF	6	Coumba Diallo
RL	5	Marine De Nadaï
LL	4	Sandra Rabier	(substituted off) 69'
TP	3	Christelle Chobet
HK	2	Laëtitia Salles	(substituted off) 49'
LP	1	Hélène Ezanno	(substituted off) 63'
Replacements:
HK	16	Gaëlle Mignot	(substituted on) 49'
PR	17	Aurélie Vernhet	(substituted on) 63'
PR	18	Elodie Portaries
LK	19	Assa Koïta	(substituted on) 69'
FL	20	Manon André	(substituted on) 77'
FH	21	Jessy Trémoulière	(substituted on) 68'
CE	22	Marjorie Mayans	(substituted on) 33'
WG	23	Julie Billes	(substituted on) 71'
Coach:
(France) Christian Galonnier

Assistant referees:
Clare Daniels (England)
Michael Patz (England)
Assessor:
Keith Page (England)

24 February 2013

Italy	15 – 16	Wales
Pens: Veronica Schiavon 5', 35', 41', 62', 75'		Tries: Catrin Edwards 27'; Lowri Harries 40'; Pens: Laura Prosser 53', 73'

Stadio Pacevecchia, Benevento
Referee: Sylvie Bros (France)

ITALY:
FB	15	Manuela Furlan
RW	14	Maria Diletta Veronese	(substituted off) 70'
OC	13	Maria Grazia Cioffi	(substituted off) 67'
IC	12	Paola Zangirolami
LW	11	Michela Sillari
FH	10	Veronica Schiavon
SH	9	Sara Barattin
N8	8	Flavia Severin
OF	7	Silvia Gaudino (C)
BF	6	Michela Este
RL	5	Alice Trevisan
LL	4	Cristina Molic
TP	3	Lucia Gai
HK	2	Sara Zanon	(substituted off) 60'
LP	1	Melissa Bettoni
Replacements:
HK	16	Debora Ballarini	(substituted on) 60'
PR	17	Marta Ferrari
FL	18	Ilaria Arrighetti
FL	19	Giuliana Campanella
FL	20	Cecilia Zublena
SH	21	Vanessa Chindamo
FH	22	Michela Tondinelli	(substituted on) 70'
WG	23	Sofia Stefan	(substituted on) 67'
Coach:
(Italy) Andrea Di Giandomenico

WALES:
FB	15	Dyddgu Hywel	(substituted off) 69'
RW	14	Rafiuke Taylor	(substituted off) 41'
OC	13	Elen Evans
IC	12	Rebecca De Filippo
LW	11	Philippa Tuttiett
FH	10	Elinor Snowsill
SH	9	Laura Prosser
N8	8	Rachel Taylor (C)
OF	7	Nia Davies
BF	6	Catrina Nicholas
RL	5	Shona Powell Hughes
LL	4	Gemma Hallett
TP	3	Catrin Edwards	(substituted off) 80+3'
HK	2	Lowri Harries	(substituted off) 78'
LP	1	Jenny Davies	(substituted off) 53'
Replacements:
HK	16	Carys Phillips	(substituted on) 78'
PR	17	Bethan Howell	(substituted on) 80+3'
PR	18	Megan York	(substituted on) 53'
N8	19	Vicky Owens
FL	20	Delyth Davies
SH	21	Amy Day
FB	22	Leila Johns	(substituted on) 69'
WG	23	Caryl James	(substituted on) 41'
Coach:
(Wales) Rhys Edwards

Assistant referees:
Federica Guerzoni (Italy)
Beatrice Benvenuti (Italy)
Assessor:
n/a

=== Week 4 ===
8 March 2013

Ireland	15 - 10	France
Tries: Niamh Briggs 16'; Ailis Egan 47'; Con: Niamh Briggs 47'; Pen: Niamh Briggs 79'		Try: Safi N'Diaye 21'; Con: Sandrine Agricole 21'; Pen: Sandrine Agricole 7'

Archerstown Road, Ashbourne, Leinster
Referee: Nicky Inwood (New Zealand)

IRELAND:
FB	15	Niamh Briggs
RW	14	Ashleigh Baxter	(substituted off) 64'
OC	13	Lynne Cantwell
IC	12	Jennifer Murphy	(substituted off) 74'
LW	11	Alison Miller
FH	10	Nora Stapleton
SH	9	Larissa Muldoon
N8	8	Joy Neville
OF	7	Claire Molloy
BF	6	Siobhan Fleming	(substituted off) 80'
RL	5	Marie Louise Reilly
LL	4	Sophie Spence
TP	3	Ailis Egan
HK	2	Gillian Bourke
LP	1	Fiona Coghlan (C)
Replacements:
HK	16	Stacey-Lea Kennedy
PR	17	Fiona Hayes
PR	18	Lauren Day
LK	19	Leigh Dargan
FL	20	Laura Guest	(substituted on) 80'
SH	21	Amy Davis
CE	22	Grace Davitt	(substituted on) 74'
WG	23	Niamh Kavanagh	(substituted on) 64'
Coach:
(Republic of Ireland) Philip Doyle

FRANCE:
FB	15	Caroline Ladagnous
RW	14	Julie Billes	(substituted off) 64'
OC	13	Marjorie Mayans
IC	12	Lucille Godiveau	(substituted off) 45'
LW	11	Elodie Guiglion	(substituted off) 75'
FH	10	Sandrine Agricole
SH	9	Marie-Alice Yahé (C)
N8	8	Safi N'Diaye
OF	7	Laëtitia Grand	(substituted off) 61'
BF	6	Coumba Diallo
RL	5	Marine De Nadaï
LL	4	Sandra Rabier	(substituted off) 67'
TP	3	Elodie Portaries	(substituted off) 41'
HK	2	Gaëlle Mignot	(substituted off) 57'
LP	1	Hélène Ezanno	(substituted off) 67'
Replacements:
HK	16	Laëtitia Salles	(substituted on) 57'
PR	17	Assa Koïta	(substituted on) 67'
PR	18	Christelle Chobet	(substituted on) 41'
LK	19	Lénaïg Corson	(substituted on) 67'
FL	20	Manon André	(substituted on) 61'
FB	21	Jessy Trémoulière	(substituted on) 64'
FH	22	Aurélie Bailon	(substituted on) 45'
WG	23	Jade Le Pesq	(substituted on) 75'
Coach:
(France) Christian Galonnier

Assistant referees:
Ken Henley-Willis (Ireland)
Gary Glennon (Ireland)
Assessor:
Tim Aplin (Ireland)

9 March 2013

England	34 - 0	Italy
Tries: Joanna McGilchrist 7'; Rosemarie Crowley 11', 38'; Sarah Hunter 18'; Sally Tuson 33'; Emily Scott 68'; Cons: Amber Reed 11', 38'

Molesey Road, Esher, Surrey
Referee: Helen O'Reilly (Ireland)

ENGLAND:
FB	15	Lauren Cattell
RW	14	Lydia Thompson	(substituted off) 56'
OC	13	Abigail Chamberlain
IC	12	Amber Reed
LW	11	Sally Tuson
FH	10	Ceri Large	(substituted off) 72'
SH	9	Georgina Gulliver	(substituted off) 51'
N8	8	Harriet Millar-Mills
OF	7	Hannah Gallagher	(substituted off) 69'
BF	6	Sarah Hunter (C)
RL	5	Emily Braund	(substituted off) 69'
LL	4	Joanna McGilchrist
TP	3	Laura Keates	(substituted off) 56'
HK	2	Victoria Fleetwood	(substituted off) 51'
LP	1	Rosemarie Crowley	(substituted off) 56'
Replacements:
HK	16	Emma Croker	(substituted on) 51'
PR	17	Kate Newton	(substituted on) 56'
PR	18	Sophie Hemming	(substituted on) 56'
LK	19	Rowena Burnfield	(substituted on) 69'
FL	20	Rebecca Essex	(substituted on) 69'
SH	21	Fiona Davidson	(substituted on) 51'
FH	22	La Toya Mason	(substituted on) 72'
WG	23	Emily Scott	(substituted on) 56'
Coach:
(England) Gary Street

ITALY:
FB	15	Manuela Furlan
RW	14	Maria Diletta Veronese	(substituted off) 55'
OC	13	Michela Sillari
IC	12	Paola Zangirolami	(substituted off) 63'
LW	11	Sofia Stefan	(substituted off) 65'
FH	10	Veronica Schiavon
SH	9	Sara Barattin
N8	8	Flavia Severin	(substituted off) 78'
OF	7	Silvia Gaudino (C)
BF	6	Michela Este	(substituted off) 63'
RL	5	Alice Trevisan	(substituted off) 57'
LL	4	Cristina Molic
TP	3	Lucia Gai	(substituted off) 70'
HK	2	Melissa Bettoni
LP	1	Awa Coulibaly	(substituted off) 48'
Replacements:
HK	16	Debora Ballarini	(substituted on) 78'
PR	17	Sara Zanon	(substituted on) 70'
PR	18	Marta Ferrari	(substituted on) 48'
LK	19	Giuliana Campanella	(substituted on) 63'
FL	20	Cecilia Zublena	(substituted on) 57'
SH	21	Vanessa Chindamo	(substituted on) 63'
FH	22	Michela Tondinelli	(substituted on) 55'
WG	23	Chiara Castellarin	(substituted on) 65'
Coach:
(Italy) Andrea Di Giandomenico

Assistant referees:
Michael Cooper (England)
Nikki O'Donnell (England)
Assessor:
Steve Riley (England)

10 March 2013

Scotland	0 - 13	Wales
		Tries: Charlie Murray 71'; Sioned Harries 77'; Pen: Laura Prosser 27'

Scotstoun Stadium, Glasgow
Referee: Claire Hodnett (England)

SCOTLAND:
FB	15	Steph Johnston
RW	14	Annabel Sergeant
OC	13	Sarah Dixon
IC	12	Laura Steven	(substituted off) 11'
LW	11	Megan Gaffney
FH	10	Tanya Griffith	(substituted off) 41'
SH	9	Louise Dalgliesh
N8	8	Susie Brown (C)	(substituted off) 78'
OF	7	Tess Forsberg
BF	6	Jade Konkel
RL	5	Bridget Millar-Mills
LL	4	Lindsay Wheeler
TP	3	Tracy Balmer
HK	2	Sarah Quick	(substituted off) 67'
LP	1	Heather Lockhart	(substituted off) 75'
Replacements:
PR	16	Beth Dickens
PR	17	Suzanne McKerlie-Hex	(substituted on) 75'
HK	18	Lindsey Smith	(substituted on) 67'
LK	19	Kelly Shields	(substituted on) 78'
SH	20	Sarah Law	(substituted on) 41'
CE	21	Leanne Neary
FB	22	Lyndsay O'Donnell
WG	23	Lauren Harris	(substituted on) 11'
Coach:
(Scotland) Karen Findlay

WALES:
FB	15	Dyddgu Hywel	(substituted off) ??'
RW	14	Caryl James
OC	13	Elen Evans
IC	12	Rebecca De Filippo
LW	11	Philippa Tuttiett	(substituted off) ??'
FH	10	Elinor Snowsill
SH	9	Laura Prosser	(substituted off) ??'
N8	8	Rachel Taylor (C)
OF	7	Nia Davies	(substituted off) ??'
BF	6	Sioned Harries
RL	5	Shona Powell Hughes	(substituted off) ??'
LL	4	Vicky Owens
TP	3	Catrin Edwards	(substituted off) ??'
HK	2	Carys Phillips	(substituted off) ??'
LP	1	Megan York	(substituted off) ??'
Replacements:
HK	16	Lowri Harries	(substituted on) ??'
PR	17	Jenny Davies	(substituted on) ??'
PR	18	Bethan Howell	(substituted on) ??'
N8	19	Gemma Hallett	(substituted on) ??'
FL	20	Catrina Nicholas	(substituted on) ??'
SH	21	Amy Day	(substituted on) ??'
WG	22	Charlie Murray	(substituted on) ??'
WG	23	Leila Johns	(substituted on) ??'
Coach:
(Wales) Rhys Edwards

Assistant referees:
Mhairi Hay (Scotland)
Alex Pratt (Scotland)
Assessor:
Andy Clift (Scotland)

=== Week 5 ===
15 March 2013

France	76 - 0	Scotland
Tries: Elodie Guiglion 3'; Julie Billes 7', 34', 41'; Gaëlle Mignot 12'; Sandrine Agricole 25', 44'; Safi N'Diaye 40'; Jessy Trémoulière 47', 60'; Christelle Chobet 51'; Lucille Godiveau 73'; Cons: Aurélie Bailon 3', 7', 12', 25', 34', 41', 47', 60'

Stade Bourillot, Dijon, Côte-d'Or
Referee: Helen O'Reilly (Ireland)

FRANCE:
FB	15	Jessy Trémoulière	(substituted off) 64'
RW	14	Julie Billes
OC	13	Sandrine Agricole
IC	12	Lucille Godiveau
LW	11	Elodie Guiglion
FH	10	Aurélie Bailon	(substituted off) 66'
SH	9	Marie-Alice Yahé (C)	(yellow card) 78'
N8	8	Safi N'Diaye
OF	7	Manon André
BF	6	Coumba Diallo	(substituted off) 55'
RL	5	Marine De Nadaï
LL	4	Sandra Rabier	(substituted off) 54'
TP	3	Elodie Portaries	(substituted off) 41'
HK	2	Gaëlle Mignot	(substituted off) 41'
LP	1	Hélène Ezanno	(substituted off) 60'
Replacements:
HK	16	Laëtitia Salles	(substituted on) 41'
PR	17	Assa Koïta	(substituted on) 60'
PR	18	Christelle Chobet	(substituted on) 41'
LK	19	Lénaïg Corson	(substituted on) 54'
FL	20	Laëtitia Grand	(substituted on) 55'
FH	21	Audrey Parra	(substituted on) 64'
CE	22	Läurelin Fourcade
WG	23	Sandra Métier	(substituted on) 66'
Coach:
(France) Christian Galonnier

SCOTLAND:
FB	15	Steph Johnston
RW	14	Lyndsay O'Donnell
OC	13	Sarah Dixon
IC	12	Annabel Sergeant
LW	11	Megan Gaffney	(substituted off) 74'
FH	10	Louise Dalgliesh
SH	9	Sarah Law	(substituted off) 49'
N8	8	Susie Brown (C)	(substituted off) 41'
OF	7	Tess Forsberg
BF	6	Jade Konkel
RL	5	Bridget Millar-Mills	(substituted off) 42'
LL	4	Lindsay Wheeler
TP	3	Tracy Balmer	(substituted off) 74'
HK	2	Sarah Quick	(substituted off) 59'
LP	1	Heather Lockhart	(substituted off) 59'
Replacements:
PR	16	Beth Dickens	(substituted on) 74'
PR	17	Suzanne McKerlie-Hex	(substituted on) 59'
HK	18	Lindsey Smith	(substituted on) 59'
LK	19	Kelly Shields	(substituted on) 42'
FL	20	Hannah Smith	(substituted on) 41'
FH	21	Tanya Griffith	(substituted on) 49'
CE	22	Leanne Neary	(substituted on) 74'
WG	23	Lauren Harris
Coach:
(Scotland) Karen Findlay

Assistant referees:
n/a
n/a
Assessor:
n/a

17 March 2013

Italy	3 – 6	Ireland
Pen: Veronica Schiavon 3'		Pens: Niamh Briggs 10', 51'

Centro Sportivo Rino Venegoni e Luciano Marazzini, Parabiago, Milan
Referee: Clare Daniels (England)

ITALY:
FB	15	Manuela Furlan
RW	14	Maria Diletta Veronese
OC	13	Michela Sillari
IC	12	Paola Zangirolami
LW	11	Maria Grazia Cioffi	(substituted off) 57'
FH	10	Veronica Schiavon
SH	9	Sara Barattin
N8	8	Flavia Severin
OF	7	Silvia Gaudino (C)
BF	6	Michela Este	(substituted off) 67'
RL	5	Alice Trevisan	(substituted off) 54' (substituted on) 57' (substituted off) 67'
LL	4	Cristina Molic
TP	3	Lucia Gai	(yellow card) 51'
HK	2	Melissa Bettoni	(substituted off) 68'
LP	1	Marta Ferrari
Replacements:
HK	16	Debora Ballarini
PR	17	Awa Coulibaly
PR	18	Sara Zanon	(substituted on) 54' (substituted off) 57' (substituted on) 68'
LK	19	Cecilia Zublena	(substituted on) 67'
FL	20	Ilaria Arrighetti	(substituted on) 67'
SH	21	Vanessa Chindamo
FH	22	Michela Tondinelli
WG	23	Sofia Stefan	(substituted on) 57'
Coach:
(Italy) Andrea Di Giandomenico

IRELAND:
FB	15	Niamh Briggs
RW	14	Niamh Kavanagh
OC	13	Lynne Cantwell
IC	12	Grace Davitt
LW	11	Alison Miller
FH	10	Nora Stapleton
SH	9	Larissa Muldoon
N8	8	Joy Neville
OF	7	Claire Molloy
BF	6	Siobhan Fleming	(substituted off) 58'
RL	5	Marie Louise Reilly
LL	4	Sophie Spence
TP	3	Ailis Egan	(substituted off) 66'
HK	2	Gillian Bourke	(substituted off) 66'
LP	1	Fiona Coghlan (C)
Replacements:
HK	16	Stacey-Lea Kennedy	(substituted on) 66'
PR	17	Fiona Hayes
PR	18	Lauren Day	(substituted on) 66'
LK	19	Heather O'Brien
FL	20	Laura Guest	(substituted on) 58'
SH	21	Amy Davis
CE	22	Shannon Huston
WG	23	Ashleigh Baxter
Coach:
(Republic of Ireland) Philip Doyle

Assistant referees:
Barbara Guastini (Italy)
Doranna De Carlini (Italy)
Assessor:
Valeria Ballardini (Italy)

17 March 2013

Wales	16 - 20	England
Tries: Charlie Murray 20'; Megan York 69'; Pens: Elinor Snowsill 39', 51'		Tries: Sarah Hunter 14'; Lydia Thompson 26'; Sally Tuson 78'; Con: Amber Reed 26'; Pen: Amber Reed 1'

Talbot Athletic Ground, Port Talbot, West Glamorgan
Referee: Nicky Inwood (New Zealand)

WALES:
FB	15	Dyddgy Hywel	(substituted off) 67'
RW	14	Caryl James
OC	13	Elen Evans
IC	12	Rebecca De Filippo
LW	11	Charlie Murray	(substituted off) 76'
FH	10	Elinor Snowsill
SH	9	Amy Day	(substituted off) 76'
N8	8	Rachel Taylor (C)
OF	7	Sioned Harries
BF	6	Catrina Nicholas	(substituted off) 67'
RL	5	Shona Powell Hughes	(substituted off) 60'
LL	4	Gemma Hallett
TP	3	Catrin Edwards	(substituted off) 62'
HK	2	Lowri Harries	(substituted off) 42'
LP	1	Jenny Davies	(substituted off) 62'
Replacements:
HK	16	Carys Phillips	(substituted on) 42'
PR	17	Megan York	(substituted on) 62'
PR	18	Bethan Howell	(substituted on) 62'
LK	19	Nia Davies	(substituted on) 60'
N8	20	Vicky Owens	(substituted on) 67'
SH	21	Laura Prosser	(substituted on) 76'
CE	22	Philippa Tuttiett	(substituted on) 76'
FB	23	Leila Johns	(substituted on) 67'
Coach:
(Wales) Rhys Edwards

ENGLAND:
FB	15	Lauren Cattell
RW	14	Lydia Thompson	(substituted off) 76'
OC	13	Abigail Chamberlain	(substituted off) 56'
IC	12	Amber Reed
LW	11	Sally Tuson
FH	10	Ceri Large
SH	9	La Toya Mason	(substituted off) 51'
N8	8	Harriet Millar-Mills	(substituted off) 56'
OF	7	Hannah Gallagher
BF	6	Sarah Hunter (C)
RL	5	Emily Braund	(substituted off) 51'
LL	4	Joanna McGilchrist
TP	3	Laura Keates	(substituted off) 51'
HK	2	Victoria Fleetwood	(substituted off) 66'
LP	1	Rosemarie Crowley	(substituted off) 51'
Replacements:
HK	16	Emma Croker	(substituted on) 66'
PR	17	Rochelle Clark	(substituted on) 51'
PR	18	Sophie Hemming	(substituted on) 51'
LK	19	Tamara Taylor	(substituted on) 51'
FL	20	Rebecca Essex	(substituted on) 56'
SH	21	Georgina Gulliver	(substituted on) 51'
CE	22	Kim Oliver	(substituted on) 56'
WG	23	Emily Scott	(substituted on) 76'
Coach:
(England) Gary Street

Assistant referees:
Simon Rees (Wales)
Alan Jenkins (Wales)
Assessor:
n/a

== Leading Scorers ==
Individual Ranking: Tries:

- 5 : Miller (Ireland).
- 4 : Trémoulière (France), Tuson (England) And Hunter (England).
- 3: Briggs (Ireland) Guiglion (France) And Billes (France).
- 2 : Crowley (England), Large (England) Chamberlain (England) Wilson (England), Murray (Wales) Ladagnous (France), Mignot (France), Agricole ( France), N'diaye (France) And Chobet (France).
- 1: Mcgilchrist (England) Gallagher (England), Reed (England) Scott (England) Gallagher (England), Clark (England), Thompson ( England), Le Pesq (France), Salles (France), Godiveau (France), Edwards (Wales), S. Harries (Wales), L. Harries (Wales), Fletcher (Wales), York (Wales), Spence (Ireland), Bourke (Ireland), Egan (Ireland) Fleming (Ireland), Severin (Italy), Barattin (Italy).

Penalties & Conversions:

1. Reed (England) 35 Pts
2. Schiavon (Italy) 29 Pts
3. Briggs (Ireland) 28 Pts
4. Bailon (France), 16 Pts
5. Trémoulière (France) 14 Pts
6. Prosser (Wales) 12 Pts
7. Agricole (France) 10 Pts
8. Snowsilll (Wales) 8 Pts
9. Ritchie (Scotland) 3 Pts

Overall Individual Points

1. Briggs (Ireland), 43 Pts
2. Reed (England) 40 Pts
3. Schiavon (Italy) 29 Pts
4. Miller (Ireland) 25 Pts
5. Trémoulière (France) 34 Pts
6. Hunter (England), Tuson (England), Agricole (France), 20 Pts
7. Bailon (France), 16 Pts
8. Guiglion (France), Billes (France), 15 Pts
