= 2014 Women's Rugby World Cup Pool B =

Rugby tournament

Pool B of the 2014 Women's Rugby World Cup was composed of 2010 World Cup champions New Zealand, Ireland, United States and Kazakhstan. Ireland won the group with three wins—including a surprise win over New Zealand—and one bonus point (against Kazakhstan).

== New Zealand vs Kazakhstan ==
1 August 2014

New Zealand	79-5	Kazakhstan
Tries:: Huriana Manuel 2', 32'; Fiao'o Fa'amausili 14', 54'; Eloise Blackwell 23'; Selica Winiata 28', 45'; Kelly Brazier 40+1', 49'; Shakira Baker 58'; Aroha Savage 65'; Aleisha Nelson 76'; Halie Tiplady-Hurring 80'; Cons: Kelly Brazier 2', 23', 28', 32', 49'; Victoria Subritzky-Nafatali 65', 76'		Tries:: Oxana Shardina 42'

CNR, Marcoussis Pitch 2
Referee: (England) Claire Hodnett

FB	15	Selica Winiata
RW	14	Shakira Baker
OC	13	Huriana Manuel	(substituted off) 54'
IC	12	Amiria Rule
LW	11	Halie Tiplady-Hurring
FH	10	Kelly Brazier	(substituted off) 60'
SH	9	Kendra Cocksedge	(substituted off) 63'
N8	8	Casey Robertson
OF	7	Justine Lavea
BF	6	Rawinia Everitt	(substituted off) 54'
RL	5	Sanita Levave
LL	4	Eloise Blackwell
TP	3	Stephanie Te Ohaere-Fox	(substituted off) 54'
HK	2	Fiao'o Fa'amausili (c)	(substituted off) 63'
LP	1	Ruth McKay
Replacements:
HK	16	Te Kura Ngata-Aerengamate	(substituted in) 63'
PR	17	Aleisha Nelson	(substituted in) 54'
FL	18	Linda Itunu
FL	19	Aroha Savage	(substituted in) 54'
SH	20	Emma Jensen	(substituted in) 63'
FH	21	Victoria Subritzky-Nafatali	(substituted in) 60'
WG	22	Honey Hireme	(substituted in) 54'
Coach:
(New Zealand) Brian Evans

FB	15	Aigerym Daurembayeva
RW	14	Veronika Stepanyuga	(substituted off) 38'
OC	13	Anna Yakovleva (c)
IC	12	Kundyzay Baktybayeva
LW	11	Nigora Nurmatova
FH	10	Svetlana Klyuchnikova	(substituted off) 18'
SH	9	Amina Baratova	(substituted off) 56'
N8	8	Symbat Zhamankulova
OF	7	Marianna Balashova
BF	6	Yelena Yevdokimova	(substituted off) 47'
RL	5	Lyudmila Matiyeva	(substituted off) 56'
LL	4	Svetlana Karatygina
TP	3	Natalya Kamendrovskaya
HK	2	Irina Radzivil
LP	1	Yelena Muradova	(substituted off) 47'
Replacements:
PR	16	Olga Sazonova
HK	17	Yelena Rogacheva	(substituted in) 77'
FL	18	Anastassiya Khamova	(substituted in) 56'
LK	19	Yelena Kiryushina	(substituted in) 47'
SH	20	Karina Proskurina	(substituted in) 64'
CE	21	Balzhan Koishybayeva	(substituted in) 38'
CE	22	Oxana Shardina	(substituted in) 18' (yellow card) 39'
Coach:
(New Zealand) Adam McDonald

== United States vs Ireland ==
1 August 2014

United States	17 - 23	Ireland
Tries:: Lynelle Kugler 6'; Carmen Farmer 42'; Cons: Kimber Rozier 6', 42'; Pens: Kimber Rozier 35'	Team Sheet	Tries:: Ailis Egan 31'; Niamh Briggs 40'; Cons: Niamh Briggs 31', 40'; Pens: Niamh Briggs 3', 10', 60'

CNR, Marcoussis Pitch 2
Referee: (Canada) Sherry Trumbull

FB	15	Meya Bizer
RW	14	Vanesha McGee
OC	13	Akalaini Baravilala
IC	12	Emilie Bydwell
LW	11	Sadie Anderson
FH	10	Kimber Rozier
SH	9	Jocelyn Tseng	(substituted off) 68'
N8	8	Kate Daley (c)
OF	7	Lynelle Kugler	(substituted off) 53'
BF	6	Jillion Potter
RL	5	Sarah Walsh	(yellow card) 29' (substituted off) 56'
LL	4	Carmen Farmer
TP	3	Jamie Burke	(substituted off) 53'
HK	2	Katy Augustyn	(substituted off) 58'
LP	1	Hope Rogers	(substituted off) 72'
Replacements:
HK	16	Kittery Wagner	(substituted in) 58'
PR	17	Sarah Chobot	(substituted in) 53'
FL	18	Sarah Wilson	(substituted in) 72'
FL	19	Sharon Blaney	(substituted in) 56'
SH	20	Shaina Turley	(substituted in) 53' (yellow card) 59'
FH	21	Deven Owsiany	(substituted in) 68'
WG	22	Hannah Stolba
Coach:
(United States) Pete Steinberg

FB	15	Niamh Briggs
RW	14	Ashleigh Baxter
OC	13	Lynne Cantwell
IC	12	Grace Davitt	(substituted off) 57'
LW	11	Alison Miller
FH	10	Nora Stapleton
SH	9	Tania Rosser	(substituted off) 75'
N8	8	Heather O'Brien
OF	7	Claire Molloy	(yellow card) 35'
BF	6	Siobhan Fleming	(substituted off) 56'
RL	5	Marie Louise Reilly
LL	4	Sophie Spence	(substituted off) 74'
TP	3	Ailis Egan
HK	2	Gillian Bourke
LP	1	Fiona Coghlan (c)
Replacements:
PR	16	Sharon Lynch
HK	17	Fiona Hayes
FL	18	Laura Guest	(substituted in) 74'
LK	19	Paula Fitzpatrick	(substituted in) 56'
SH	20	Larissa Muldoon	(substituted in) 75'
CE	21	Jenny Murphy	(substituted in) 57'
CE	22	Jackie Shiels
Coach:
(Ireland) Philip Doyle

== United States vs Kazakhstan ==
5 August 2014

United States	47–7	Kazakhstan
Tries: Nathalie Marchino 20', Vanesha McGee 29', Kittery Wagner 36', Hanna Stolba 43', Emilie Bydwell 47', Sylvia Braaten 55', 63', Meya Bizer 74'; Cons: Hannah Stolba 43',47'; Pens:Hannah Stolba 70'	Team Sheet	Tries:Anna Yakovleva 12'; Cons: Aigerym Daurembayeva 12'

CNR, Marcoussis Pitch 2
Referee: (Spain) Alhambra Nievas

== New Zealand vs Ireland ==
5 August 2014

New Zealand	14–17	Ireland
Tries: Selica Winiata 26'; Pens: Kelly Brazier 22', 47', 65'	Team Sheet	Tries: Heather O'Brien 34', Alison Miller 60'; Cons: Niamh Briggs 34', 60'; Pens: Niamh Briggs 70'

CNR, Marcoussis Pitch 1
Referee: (United States) Leah Berard

== Ireland vs Kazakhstan ==
9 August 2014

Ireland	40–5	Kazakhstan
Tries: Sharon Lynch 6', 70', Tania Rosser 36', Penalty Try 64', Siobhan Fleming 66', Vicki McGinn 80 +3'; Cons: Jackie Shiels 6', 36' 66', 70', 80+3'	Team Sheet	Tries: Svetlana Karatygina 22'

CNR, Marcoussis Pitch 2
Referee: (New Zealand) Nicky Inwood

== New Zealand vs United States ==
9 August 2014

New Zealand	34–3	United States
Tries: Huriana Manuel 10', 60', Claire Richardson 12', Kendra Cocksedge 64', Renee Wickliffe 68', Justine Lavea 80'; Cons: Kelly Brazier 10', 64'; Cards: Linda Itunu (yellow card) 45'	Team Sheet	Pens: Kimber Rozier 52'

CNR, Marcoussis Pitch 1
Referee: (Canada) Sherry Turnbull
