= 2017 IRFU Women's Interprovincial Series =

Irish rugby union competition

- Countries: Ireland
- Date: 2 December 2017; 16 December 2017
- Champions: Munster
- Runners-up: Leinster
- Matches played: 6
- Top point scorer: Aimee Clarke (20) (Leinster)
- Top try scorer: Aimee Clarke (4) (Leinster)

The 2017 IRFU Women's Interprovincial Series was won by Munster who clinched the title following an 11–5 win over Leinster on the final day of the competition. Munster and Leinster both finished the competition with two wins and ten points each. Munster were subsequently declared champions on points difference. Munster were coached by Laura Guest and captained by Siobhan Fleming.

== Final table ==
Position	Province	Games				Points					Table points
Position	Province	Played	Won	Drawn	Lost	For	Against	Difference	TB	LB	Table points
1	Munster	3	2	0	1	58	29	+29	1	1	10
2	Leinster	3	2	0	1	56	29	+27	1	1	10
3	Connacht	3	2	0	1	56	39	+17	1	0	9
4	Ulster	3	0	0	3	22	95	–73	0	0	0

== Results ==
=== Round 1 ===
2 December 2017
14:30

Connacht	19–15	Munster
Try: Edel McMahon ? O'Connor ? Amelie Roux; Con: ?		Try: Laura O'Mahoney ? Con: Edel Murphy; Pen: Edel Murphy

Galway Sportsgrounds

3 December 2017
14:00

Ulster	10–34	Leinster
Try: Eliza Downey ?		Try: Aimee Clarke (3); Michelle Claffey; Susan Vaughan; Lindsay Peat; Con: Aine Donnelly (2)

Barban Hill, Dromore, County Down

=== Round 2 ===
9 December 2017
14:00

Munster	32–5	Ulster
Try: Rachel Allen; Chloe Pearse; Niamh Kavanagh; Laura Sheehan; Edel Murphy; Christine Arthurs; Con: Ellen Murphy		Try: Amy Graham

Dooradoyle

9 December 2017
17:00

Leinster	17–8	Connacht
Try: Aimee Clarke; Michelle Claffey; Ailsa Hughes; Con: Aine Donnelly		Try: Mairead Coyne; Pen: Hillary Griffin

Donnybrook Stadium

=== Round 3 ===
16 December 2017
14:30

Munster	11–5	Leinster
Try: Gillian Bourke; Con: Ellen Murphy (2)		Try: Ailsa Hughes

Thomond Park

16 December 2017
15:00

Ulster	7–29	Connacht
Try: Brittany Hogan; Con: Beth Cregan		Try: Alison Miller (2); Jane O'Neill; Orla Dixon; Ciara O'Connor; Con: Hilary Griffin (2)

Belfast Harlequins
