= Marie-Alice Yahé =

French rugby union player

- Born: 10 July 1984 (age 42) Le Creusot, Saône-et-Loire, France
- Height: 1.66 m (5 ft 5 in)
- Weight: 63 kg (9 st 13 lb)
- School: Lycée Jean-Marc Boivin

Rugby union career
- Position: Scrum-half
Amateur team(s)
Years	Team	Apps	(Points)
2001-2002	AS Tournus Rugby		
- Correct as of 30 January 2012
Senior career
Years	Team	Apps	(Points)
2002-2006	Rugby Nice UR		
2006-2008	Montpellier HRC		
2008-2009	USA Toulouges		
2009-	USA Perpignan		
- Correct as of 30 January 2012
International career
Years	Team	Apps	(Points)
2008–2014	France	47	(0)
- Correct as of 30 January 2012

Marie-Alice "Malice" Yahé (born 10 July 1984) is a former French rugby union player who captained France. She also played in the scrum-half position for USA Perpignan.

== Biography ==
The daughter of Philippe Yahé, a former player of RC Montceau (now RC Montceau Bourgogne), and the sister of Yves-Marie, a current player for the same club, she was introduced to rugby by his older brother Jean-Baptiste because "he needed somebody to throw the ball back to himself".

While attending Lycée Jean-Marc Boivin in Chevigny-Saint-Sauveur, her friend Fanny brought her in the field where the school's sport section was playing rugby union. Yahé already knew the rules of the game and was able to pass the ball to both sides. Didier Retière, at that time a regional technical advisor of Burgundy.

=== Rugby career ===
She first played for Coquelicots de Tournus, the female section of AS Tournus Rugby trained by Marie-Céline Bernard, and then for Rugby Nice UR of coach Laurent David, a team with whom she won 2ème Division Féminine championship in 2004.

After these early experiences, Yahé chose to join a higher level club, Montpellier Hérault RC, and won her first 1ère Division Féminine title by defeating 10-3 Ovalie Cannaise at Stade Lesdiguières in Grenoble on 24 June 2007.

She made her international debut with France in the 0-3 defeat against Wales at Cae Gwyn, Taff's Well, on 15 March 2008, when she replaced fullback Caroline Ladagnous at 70th minute.

Another important success arrived on 29 May 2010 when, as USA Perpignan's scrum-half, she defeated 26-5 her former team Montpellier at Stade Jean-Bouin in Paris by winning her second French national championship.

Yahé became the captain of France against Scotland on 4 February 2011 during Six Nations.
