= 2011 Women's Six Nations Championship =

- Date: 4 February 2011 – 19 March 2011
- Countries: England; France; Ireland; Italy; Scotland; Wales

Tournament statistics
- Champions: England (12th title)
- Grand Slam: England (11th title)
- Triple Crown: England (14th title)
- Matches played: 15
- Tries scored: 85 (5.67 per match)
- Top point scorer: (England) Katy McLean (58)
- Top try scorers: (France) Élodie Poublan (5) (England) Maggie Alphonsi (5)

The 2011 Women's Six Nations Championship, also known as the 2011 RBS Women's 6 Nations due to the tournament's sponsorship by the Royal Bank of Scotland, was the tenth series of the Women's Six Nations Championship, an annual women's rugby union competition between six European rugby union national teams. Matches were held between 4 February and 19 March 2011, on the same weekends as the men's tournament, if not always the same day. The game between England and Scotland on 13 March followed the men's international between the same two nations and was shown live on the BBC. The match between England and France was also shown live on Sky TV in the UK, and France vs Scotland was broadcast live on Orange TV in France.

The championship was contested by England, France, Ireland, Italy, Scotland and Wales. England were favourites to win the tournament, and their victory was their sixth title in a row. Italy also had their best Six Nations ever. Scotland, on the other hand, lost every match (other than their game against Ireland) by record margins.

== Table ==
Position	Nation	Games				Points				Table points
Position	Nation	Played	Won	Drawn	Lost	For	Against	Difference	Tries	Table points
1	England	5	5	0	0	223	8	+215	36	10
2	France	5	4	0	1	113	51	+62	16	8
3	Ireland	5	2	0	3	74	70	+4	12	4
4	Wales	5	2	0	3	64	72	−8	9	4
5	Italy	5	2	0	3	68	130	−62	9	4
6	Scotland	5	0	0	5	20	231	−211	3	0

== Fixtures and results ==
=== Week 1 ===
2011-02-04

France	53–3	Scotland
Tries: Sandrine Agricole 3'; Élodie Poublan 6', 17', 28', 55', 72'; Dioni Aguerre 10', 76'; Laurelin Fourcade 40'; Cons: Sandrine Agricole 17', 28'; Nadège Cazenave 55', 76'		Pen: Caroline Collie 13'

Stade Eric Durand, Viry-Châtillon, Essonne
Referee: Claire Hodnett (England)

2011-02-06

Italy	5–26	Ireland
Try: Flavia Severin 28'		Tries: Niamh Kavanagh 40'; Gillian Bourke 54'; Claire Molloy 68'; Mairead Kelly 76'; Pens: Niamh Briggs 34', 43'

Stadio Mario Battaglini, Rovigo
Referee: Joyce Henry (Canada)

2011-02-06

Wales	0–19	England
		Tries: Francesca Matthews 11'; Penalty try 39'; Danielle Waterman 48'; Cons: Katy McLean 39', 48'

Pandy Park, Crosskeys, Caerphilly
Referee: Mark Patton (Ireland)

=== Week 2 ===
2011-02-11

Ireland	12–14	France
Tries: Niamh Kavanagh; Niamh Briggs; Cons: Niamh Briggs		Try: Christelle Chobet; Pens: Sandrine Agricole (2); Aurelie Bailon

Ashbourne
Referee: Federica Guerzoni (ITA)

2011-02-12

England	68–5	Italy
Tries: Maggie Alphonsi 7'; Heather Fisher(2); Danielle Waterman (2); Emily Scarratt; Kat Merchant; Rowena Burnfield; Katherine Merchant; Toya Mason; Georgina Roberts; Cons: Katy McLean (5); Pen: Katy McLean		Try: Chiara Castellarin

Esher
Referee: Mhairi Hay (SCO)

2011-02-13

Scotland	12–41	Wales
Tries: Tracy Balmer; Lindsay Wheeler; Cons: Caroline Collie		Tries: Elan Evans(3); Charlotte Murray; Caryl James; Kerin Kake; Cons: Aimee Young; Pens: Aimee Young (3)

Burnbrae, Milngavie
Referee: Sylvie Bros (FRA)

=== Week 3 ===
2011-02-26

Scotland	5–22	Ireland
Try: Lauren Harris		Tries: Lynne Cantwell (2); Ger Rea; Niamh Briggs; Con: Niamh Briggs

New Hawthornden Stadium, Lasswade
Referee: Claire Daniels (ENG)

2011-02-27

Italy	12–8	Wales
Tries: Maria Diletta Veronese 14'; Maria Grazia Cioffi 40'; Cons: Veronica Schiavon 40'		Try: Kerin Lake 50'; Pen: Amiee Young 6'

La Spezia, Liguria
Referee: Alan Campbell (SCO)

2011-02-27

England	16–3	France
Tries: Amy Garnett; Katy McLean; Pens: Katy McLean (2)		Pens: Nadège Cazenave

Sixways Stadium, Worcester
Referee: Wayne Davies (WAL)

=== Week 4 ===
2011-03-13

Italy	20–28	France
Tries: Paola Zangirolami; Flavia Severin; Cons: Veronica Schiavon(2); Pens: Veronica Schiavon (2)		Tries: Sandrine Agricole; Claire Canal; Élodie Poublan; Cons: Sandrine Agricole (2); Pens: Sandrine Agricole; Nadège Casenave (2)

Benevento
Referee: Nicky Inwood (NZL)

2011-03-13

Wales	15–14	Ireland
Tries: Elen Evans; Adi Taviner; Cons: Amiee Young; Pens: Amiee Young		Tries: Gillian Bourke (2); Cons: Niamh Briggs (2)

Pandy Park, Crosskeys
Referee: Federica Guerzoni (ITA)

2011-03-13

England	89–0	Scotland
Tries: Katherine Merchant 2', 35'; Francesca Matthews 6'; Emily Scarratt 12', 49'; Becky Essex 15'; Rochelle Clarke 32', 51'; Heather Fisher 39', 41'; Maggie Alphonsi 55', 72'; Katy McLean 67'; Danielle Waterman 75', 79'; Cons: Katy McLean 13', 33', 40', 42', 52', 72', 79'

Twickenham
Referee: Dana Teagarden (USA)

=== Week 5 ===
2011-03-18

Ireland	0–31	England
		Tries: Katy McLean; Sarah Hunter; Rochelle Clark; Sophie Hemming; Maggie Alphonsi; Cons: Katy McLean (3)

Ashbourne
Referee: Sarah Corrigan (AUS)

2011-03-19

France	15–0	Wales
Tries: Dioni Aguerre; Laurelin Fourcade; Penalty try

Stade Pierre Rajon, Bourgoin-Jallieu
Referee: Claire Daniels (ENG)

2011-03-20

Scotland	0–26	Italy
		Tries: Michela Este; Manuela Furlan; Veronica Schiavon; Cons: Veronica Schiavon; Pens: Veronica Schiavon (3)

Meggetland, Edinburgh
Referee: Nicky Inwood (NZL)

== See also ==
- Women's Six Nations Championship
- Women's international rugby

== Leading scorers ==
=== Point scorers ===
Points	Name	Team	Notes
58	Katy McLean	England	3 tries, 17 cons, 3 pens
30	Élodie Poublan	France	6 tries
28	Veronica Schiavon	Italy	1 try, 4 cons, 5 pens
26	Sandrine Agricole	France	3 tries, 4 cons, 1 pen
25	Danielle Waterman	England	5 tries
24	Niamh Briggs	Ireland	2 tries, 4 cons, 2 pens
20	Maggie Alphonsi	England	4 tries
20	Elen Evans	Wales	4 tries
20	Heather Fisher	England	4 tries
19	Aimee Young	Wales	2 con, 5 pens
15	Dioni Aguerre	France	3 tries
15	Gillian Bourke	Ireland	3 tries
15	Nadège Cazenave	France	3 tries
15	Rochelle Clark	England	3 tries
15	Emily Scarrett	England	3 tries
10	Lynne Cantwell	Ireland	2 tries
10	Laurelin Fourcade	France	2 tries
10	Niamh Kavanagh	Ireland	2 tries
10	Kerin Lake	Wales	2 tries
10	Francesca Matthews	England	2 tries
10	Flavia Severin	Italy	2 tries

=== Other point scorers ===
5 points (one try, except where stated): Amy Garnett, Caroline Collie (1 pen, 1 con), Caryl James, Charlotte Murray, Chiara Castellarin, Christelle Chobet, Sophie Hemming, Sarah Hunter, Claire Molloy, Georgina Roberts, Geraldine Rea, Kat Merchant, Lauren Harris, Lindsay Wheeler, Mairead Kelly, Maria Diletta Veronese, Maria Grazia Cioffi, Rowena Burnfield, Toya Mason, Tracy Balmer, Claire Canal, Paola Zangirolami, Adi Taviner, Becky Essex, Michela Este, Manuela Furlan. 3 points (one pen): Aurelie Bailon
