= Niamh Kavanagh (rugby union) =

- Born: 30 July 1987 (age 39) Portlaoise, Laois, Ireland
- Height: 1.77 m (5 ft 10 in)
- Weight: 77 kg (170 lb)

Rugby union career
- Position: Wing
Senior career
Years	Team	Apps	(Points)
	UL Bohemians R.F.C.		(0)
International career
Years	Team	Apps	(Points)
2011–	Ireland	15	

Niamh Kavanagh (born 30 July 1987) is an Irish rugby union player.

== Biography ==
Kavanagh's rugby career began in 2009 with UL Bohemians R.F.C. while she was studying Law and Tax at the Limerick Institute of Technology. She scored the first try on her debut for Ireland at the 2011 Six Nations against Italy. Two years later she was part of the squad that won a historic Grand Slam title at the 2013 Six Nations Championship.

Kavanagh was initially named in Ireland's squad for the 2014 Rugby World Cup but was ruled out due to a hamstring injury she sustained in Ireland's final warm-up match against Wales. She was replaced by Vikki McGinn.

Kavanagh returned to the international stage in a 48–7 loss to Canada in 2016. She later played against the Black Ferns and scored a late consolation try in her sides 38–8 loss. In 2021 she was named in Munster's squad for the Vodafone Women's Interpros.
