= Ladagnous =

Ladagnous is a French surname. Notable people with the surname include:

- Caroline Ladagnous (born 1988), French rugby union player
- Matthieu Ladagnous (born 1984), French cyclist
