= Rebecca De Filippo =

Wales international rugby union player

- Born: 25 February 1994 (age 32) Swansea, Wales
- Height: 1.65 m (5.4 ft)
- Weight: 76 kg (12.0 st)
- University: Exeter University

Rugby union career
- Position: Centre
Amateur team(s)
Years	Team	Apps	(Points)
- Bristol Ladies
International career
Years	Team	Apps	(Points)
2012–present	Wales	20	
- Correct as of 30 April 2016

Rebecca De Filippo (born 25 February 1994) is a Welsh rugby union player who plays centre for Bristol Ladies and the Wales women's national rugby union team. She won her first international cap against Scotland in the 2012 Women's Six Nations Championship.

== Playing career ==
Rebecca De Filippo was born in Swansea, Wales, on 25 February 1994. She played for the Coleg Sir Gâr women's rugby team, where she was a member of the under-18s team who won the women's National Schools Sevens in 2012.

By the age of 17, De Filippo was the captain of the Wales women's national under-18 and under-20 rugby union team. She studied for a Bachelor of Science degree in sport and exercise science at Exeter University. She was a runner-up for Welsh Young Sports Personality of the year during 2013–14.

Rebecca De Filippo made her debut for the Wales women's national rugby union team against Scotland during the 2012 Women's Six Nations Championship after being brought on for Philippa Tuttiett. The game took place a week before De Filippo's 18th birthday. Wales won the game 20–0, and although she spent time in the penalty box, she was praised by coach Rhys Edwards. The following week, she made her starting debut on her 18th birthday at Twickenham against England, replacing Tuttiett. She was named to the team that competed at the 2014 Women's Rugby World Cup.

As of 2016, her official Wales Rugby Union biography states that she is 1.65 metres (5.4 ft) tall, and weighs 76 kilograms (12.0 st). She is a volunteer and mentor for the Dame Kelly Holmes Trust. She currently plays for Bristol Ladies rugby union team.
