= Elen Evans =

Wales international rugby union player

- Born: 9 January 1985 (age 41) Aberystwyth, Ceredigion, Wales
- Height: 1.6 m (5.2 ft)
- Weight: 68 kg (10.7 st)
- Notable relative(s): Geraint Evans, Dylan Evans

Rugby union career
- Position: Centre
- Current team: Caernarfon RFC/Scarlets
Amateur team(s)
Years	Team	Apps	(Points)
- Caernarfon RFC
–	Scarlets		
International career
Years	Team	Apps	(Points)
2004–2017	Wales	73	
- Correct as of 1 May 2016

Elen Evans (born 9 January 1985) is a Welsh rugby union player who plays centre or wing for Caernarfon RFC, the Scarlets and the Wales women's national rugby union team. She won her first international cap against Ireland in the 2004 Women's Six Nations Championship.

== Playing career ==
Elen Evans was born in Aberystwyth, Ceredigion on 9 January 1985. As of 2016, her official Wales Rugby Union biography states that she is 1.6 metres (5.2 ft) tall, and weighs 68 kilograms (10.7 st).

She won her first cap for the Wales women's national rugby union team at the age of 18 against Ireland in the 2004 Women's Six Nations Championship. Since then she has commuted four times a week from Dolgellau, Gwynedd, to Cardiff, in order to take part in training. This is a round trip of some six hours.

When she was first called up to the team, she was travelling at her own expense although the team has since paid her travel expenses. She works full-time in Dolgellau at her uncle's (Gwyndaf Evans) car dealership. During the game against Scotland in the 2011 Women's Six Nations Championship she scored four three tries; she scored a further try in another match and ended the tournament as the Welsh top scorer.

Evans was one of the torch bearers during the torch relay prior to the 2012 Summer Olympics. She carried the torch while on board a lifeboat as it crossed the Menai Strait between Anglesey and the Welsh mainland. After she was picked for the Welsh squad at the 2014 Women's Rugby World Cup, she had to take two weeks of unpaid leave from her job to attend the tournament. At club level, she currently plays for Caernarfon RFC and the Scarlets.
