= Lucia Gai =

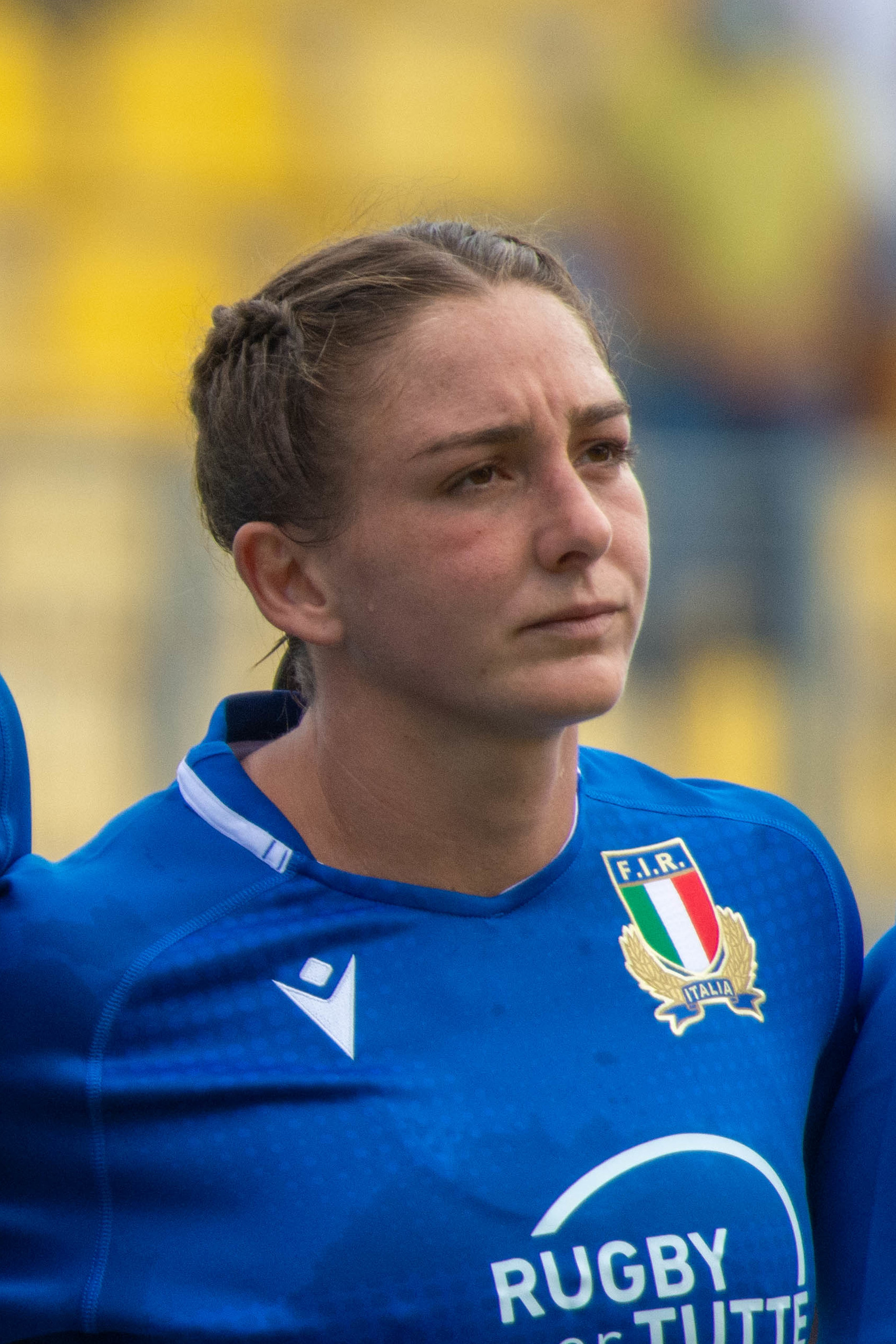
- Gai before the match against Spain for the RWC 2021 qualification
- Born: 3 May 1991 (age 35) Pesaro, Italy
- Height: 170 cm (5 ft 7 in)
- Weight: 80 kg (176 lb; 12 st 8 lb)

Rugby union career
- Position: Prop
Senior career
Years	Team	Apps	(Points)
2008–2009	Pesaro		(0)
2009–2010	Brenta Riviera		(0)
2010–2011	Pesaro		(0)
2011–2016	Brenta Riviera		(0)
2016–2017	Valsugana	12	(0)
2017–2018	Rennes		(0)
2018–	Valsugana		(0)
International career
Years	Team	Apps	(Points)
2009–	Italy	100	(15)

Lucia Gai (born 3 May 1991) is an Italian rugby union player. She plays as a Prop for Italy at an international level and for Valsugana at club level.

== Rugby career ==
Born in Pesaro, she started playing rugby as a centre; she then moved to Mira to play for Brenta Riviera, she converted to second row and subsequently to prop; she won the national title in her debut season for her new club and, at the same time, made her test debut for the national team in the 2009 FIRA Women's Trophy aged 18.

Returning to Pesaro in 2010, she confirmed her place as a regular in the Italian team that took part in the 2011 Six Nations. She returned to Brenta Riviera for a second time in 2011. In 2016 she moved to Valsugana in Padua to finish her studies in motor sciences at the local university. She won two more championships with Valsugana in 2016 and 2017.

Gai joined French club, Rennes, in 2017. She competed at the 2017 Women's Rugby World Cup in Ireland with the national team where they reached ninth place overall.

During the 2024 Six Nations match against Wales, Gai became only the second Italian woman to become a centurion.
