= Debora Ballarini =

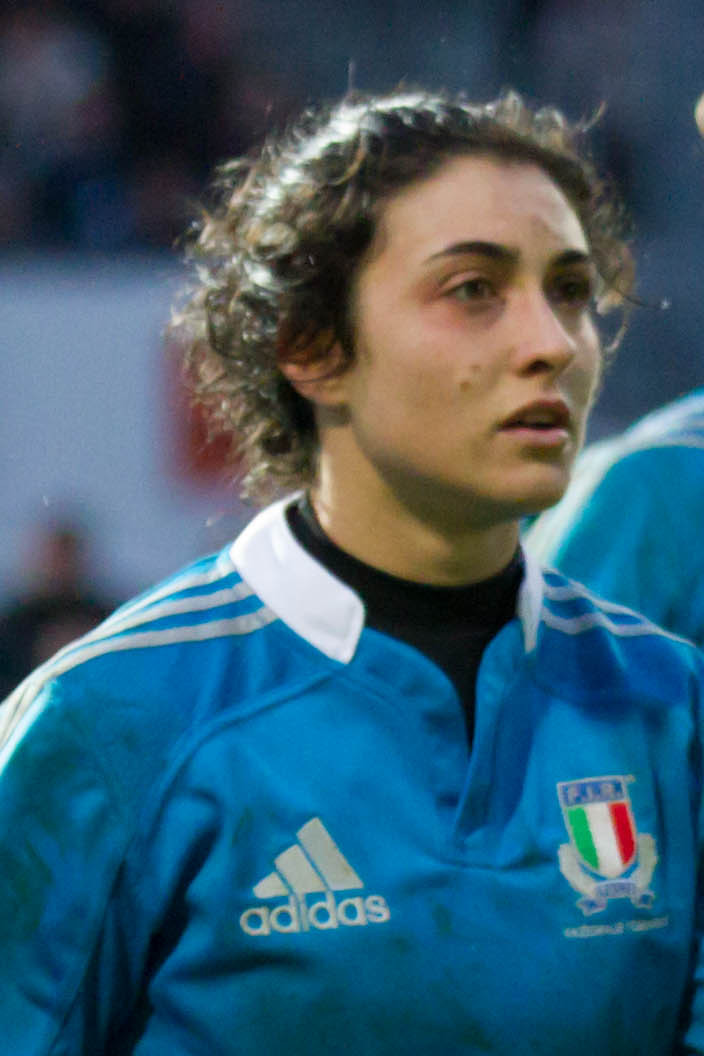
- Debora Ballarini in 2014
- Born: 27 July 1987 (age 39) Ravenna, Italy
- Height: 1.70 m (5.6 ft)
- Weight: 68 kg (10.7 st)

Rugby union career
- Position: Hooker
- Current team: Rugby Riviera 1975 ASD
Amateur team(s)
Years	Team	Apps	(Points)
2008–2013	Pesaro Mustangs		(0)
2013–	Rugby Riviera 1975 ASD		(0)
International career
Years	Team	Apps	(Points)
2011–14	Italy	15	(0)

Debora Ballarini (born 27 July 1987) is an Italian rugby union player who plays as a hooker for Rugby Riviera 1975 ASD and the Italy women's national rugby union team.

== Sporting career ==
Ballarini previously played for the Pesaro Mustangs when she was called up to the Italy women's national rugby union team for the 2012 Women's Six Nations Championship, and continued to play for them during the following season. By 2015, she had transferred to Rugby Riviera 1975 ASD.

In 2018, Ballarini was involved in promoting and supporting a charity running event along with several other sportswomen, to support work to prevent violence against women.
