= Jade Konkel =

Scottish rugby player (born 1993)

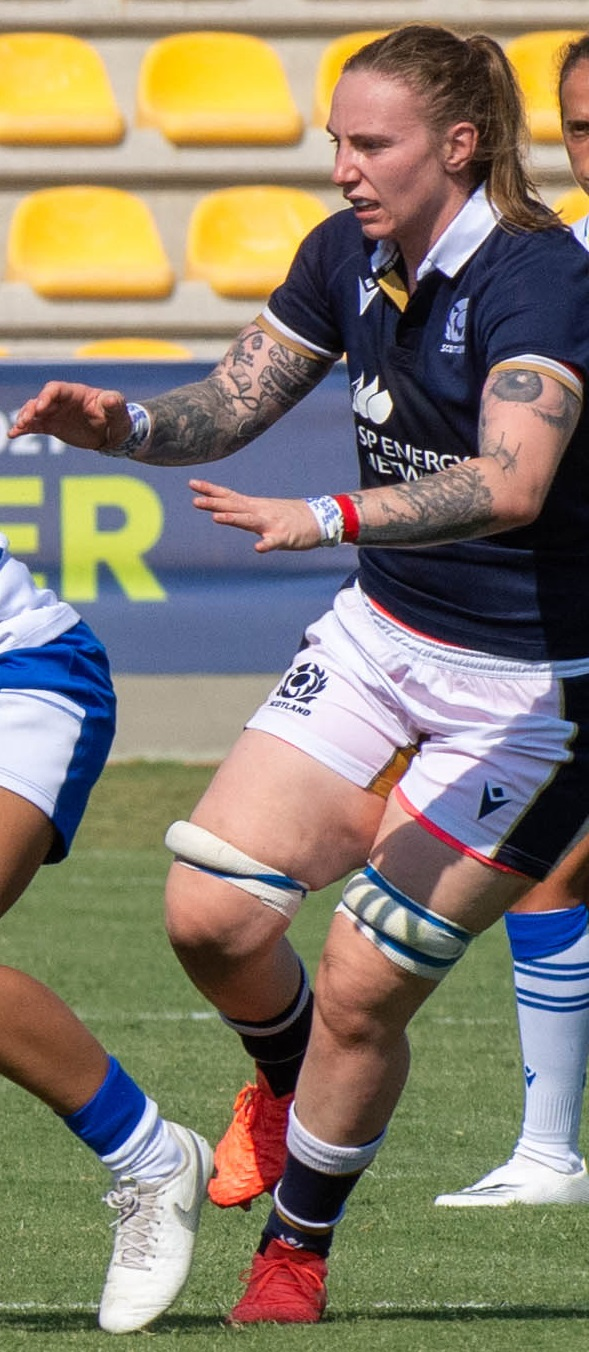
- Konkel in 2021
- Full name: Jade Elizabeth Konkel-Roberts
- Born: Jade Elizabeth Konkel; 9 December 1993 (age 32) Inverness, Scotland
- Height: 1.75 m (5 ft 9 in)
- Weight: 85 kg (13 st 5 lb; 187 lb)
- University: Glasgow Caledonian University

Rugby union career
- Position: Number 8
- Current team: Harlequins Women
Amateur team(s)
Years	Team	Apps	(Points)
–2017	Hillhead Jordanhill RFC		
Senior career
Years	Team	Apps	(Points)
2017–18	Lille		
2018–present	Harlequins		
International career
Years	Team	Apps	(Points)
2013–2025	Scotland	74	(50)
- Correct as of 20 November 2025

Jade Elizabeth Konkel-Roberts (née Konkel; born 9 December 1993), known professionally as Jade Konkel, is a professional rugby union player. She currently plays for Harlequins Women in the PWR, having joined the team in 2018 and been appointed club captain in 2023. Konkel also played for the Scotland women's national team from 2013 to 2025, after which she retired from international rugby. Konkel plays in the position of Number 8.

== Club career ==
After moving to Glasgow to attend university, Konkel played for Hillhead Jordanhill Rugby Football Club. Konkel became Scottish Rugby's first full-time female player in the summer of 2016.

Konkel joined French club Lille Metropole Rugby Club Villeneuvois (LMRCV) ahead of the 2017/18 season, while still remaining a Stage 3 supported player in Scottish Rugby's Academy.

Konkel left Lille for London-based side Harlequins ahead of the 2018/19 season to play Premiership Women’s Rugby for Harlequins Women. She was named captain ahead of the 2023/2024 season.

== International career ==
Konkel made her Scotland Women debut against England on 2 February 2013 when she came on as a replacement for Mary Lafaiki in the first game of the 2013 Women's Six Nations at Molesey Road, Surrey.

Her first try for her country came in 2015 when she scored against Italy in the Six Nations clash at Broadwood Stadium.

Konkel was included in Scotland's squad for the 2021 World Cup in New Zealand (which took place in 2022 due to the COVID-19 pandemic), starting all three games.

Konkel was named in Scotland's squad for the 2025 Six Nations Championship. She was also selected in the Scottish side for the 2025 Women's Rugby World Cup in England.

Konkel retired from international rugby in 2025 following the Rugby World Cup.

== Playing style ==
Konkel is known as a hard carrying, physical player. In the opening rounds of the 2020 Six Nations, she carried a combined 55 times (away to Ireland and versus England at BT Murrayfield) which was over 20 carries more than any other player over the first two rounds of the tournament.

== Education ==
Konkel graduated from Glasgow Caledonian University with a DipHE in Social Work in 2017

== Other sports ==
Konkel played basketball for Highland Bears and had two seasons in the national league.

She represented Scotland in athletics for the army cadets and won two gold medals in 2008/09 for shot put and discus respectively. In 2008, Konkel gained her black belt in the martial art Goshin-Ryu Kempo.

== Personal life ==
Born in Inverness, and brought up on the Black Isle, Konkel grew up in a rugby family. Her family played with Inverness Craig Dunain Rugby Football Club.

Konkel is a vegan. She is also a qualified personal trainer, rugby coach, and gym instructor.

Outside of rugby, Konkel works as a firefighter with the London Fire Brigade (LFB). She married her partner Helen, a secondary school English teacher, in 2022.
