= Becky Essex =

England international rugby union player

- Born: 16 November 1982 (age 43)
- Height: 176 cm (5 ft 9 in)
- Weight: 75 kg (165 lb; 11 st 11 lb)

Rugby union career
- Position: Lock
Senior career
Years	Team	Apps	(Points)
	Richmond		(0)
International career
Years	Team	Apps	(Points)
2006–2014	England	57	(0)
Medal record
Representing England
Women's rugby union
Rugby World Cup
Gold medal – first place	2014 France	Team competition
Silver medal – second place	2010 England	Team competition

Rebecca Anne Essex (born 16 November 1982) is an English female rugby union player and headteacher. She competed for England at the 2010 Rugby World Cup and was part of the Champion, 2014 side.

== Rugby career ==
In 2007, she captained the England A side in their second outing of the European Championships in Madrid, Spain. In 2009, the Black Ferns toured England in a two-test series, she featured in the match that saw her side defeat the World Champions 10–3.

Essex was a member of the England side that were Six Nations champions and Grand Slam winners ahead of the World Cup. She represented England at the 2010 Women's Rugby World Cup. In 2011, She was also in the English side that won their sixth Six Nations title and crowned Grand Slam winners again.

Essex earned her 50th cap in the 2014 Women's Six Nations match against Ireland. She was subsequently named in the squad that won the 2014 Rugby World Cup. Later that year, she announced her retirement from the English team but would still play for Richmond. She works as the head of an ASD center at Strand on the Green school in Chiswick.

In 2015, she became an RFU Disciplinary Panel member. She returned to the pitch in November 2017 when she was invited to play for the inaugural Women's Barbarians team against Munster, her side won 19–0.
