= Sophie Spence =

Ireland international rugby union player

- Born: 26 February 1987 (age 39) South Shields, Tyne & Wear, England
- Height: 1.81 m (5 ft 11 1/2 in)
- Weight: 87 kg (192 lb; 13 st 10 lb)
- School: Brinkburn Comprehensive
- University: Teesside University
- Occupation: Teacher / Sports lecturer / Sports coach

Rugby union career
- Position: Second Row / Back Row
Senior career
Years	Team	Apps	(Points)
- Darlington
- Darlington Mowden Park Sharks
- Old Belvedere
2018–	Barbarians		
Provincial / State sides
Years	Team	Apps	(Points)
- Irish Exiles
- Leinster
International career
Years	Team	Apps	(Points)
2012–2017	Ireland	36+	
National sevens team
Years	Team		Comps
2013	Ireland 7s		
Coaching career
- Years: Team
- 2014–2016: Mount Temple Comprehensive School
- 2014–2017: Dublin City University
- 2015: Leinster U18 Girls

Sophie Spence (born 26 February 1987) is a former Ireland women's rugby union international. Spence represented Ireland at the 2014 and 2017 Women's Rugby World Cups. Spence was a member of the first Ireland teams to defeat England and New Zealand. She was also a member of the Ireland teams that won the 2013 and 2015 Women's Six Nations Championships. Spence is a British Nigerian who qualified to represent Ireland through her mother, who was originally from Lisburn, County Antrim.

== Early years, family and education ==
Spence is the daughter of Myrtle Spence, who was originally from Lisburn, County Antrim. Her father was a Nigerian marine engineering student. Myrtle Spence moved to South Shields, Tyne & Wear in the early 1980s, when she was in her mid-twenties, and subsequently met and had a relationship with Sophie's father. Sophie Spence was born and raised in South Shields, where she attended Ashley Road Primary School and Brinkburn Comprehensive. As a child she regularly spent holidays with her mother's family in Belfast. In her youth, Spence initially played netball. Between 2005 and 2010 she attended Teesside University, where she gained a BASc in sports and exercise coaching science, a master's degree in sport psychology and a PGCE.

== Playing career ==
=== Clubs ===
Spence began playing women's rugby union while at Teesside University. She played with Darlington before joining Darlington Mowden Park Sharks who played in the Women's Premiership. Her teammates at Sharks included the England international captain, Katy McLean. Spence subsequently made her debut for both Ireland and the Ireland Sevens while a Sharks player. In 2013, after moving to Dublin to further her Ireland career, Spence began playing for Old Belvedere.

=== Provincial level ===
In August 2011 Spence tried out for the Irish Exiles. Spence has also played for Leinster in the IRFU Women's Interprovincial Series. In addition to playing for Leinster, Spence has worked for Leinster Rugby in various coaching and community development roles.

=== Barbarians ===
In March 2018 Spence played for the Barbarians against a British Army XV.

=== Ireland international ===
Between 2012 and 2017 Spence played for Ireland. After Spence attended an Irish Exiles trials in August 2011, Philip Doyle decided to fast track her into the Ireland team. Doyle recognised her potential and was keen to claim her for Ireland before England came calling. She subsequently made her debut for Ireland on 3 February 2012 against Wales. The match was abandoned at half-time because of a frozen pitch. Spence went on to represent Ireland at the 2014 and 2017 Women's Rugby World Cups. Spence was a member of the first Ireland teams to defeat England and New Zealand. She was also a member of the Ireland teams that won the 2013 and 2015 Women's Six Nations Championships. In 2015 she was a nominee for the IRB Women's Player of the Year, the RTÉ Sports Person of the Year and was named the Guinness Rugby Writers of Ireland Women's Player of the Year. Spence retired as an Ireland international after failing to make the squad for the 2018 Women's Six Nations Championship.

Spence played for the Ireland women's national rugby sevens team in the 2013 European Women's Sevens Grand Prix Series.

== Employment ==
Spence has worked in various teaching, coaching and development roles. Between 2010 and 2013 she worked at Hartlepool Sixth Form College, where she managed the netball academy. After moving to Dublin, Spence worked for Leinster Rugby in various coaching and community development roles. Between 2014 and 2017 she worked as a rugby union development officer with Dublin City University. She also worked as a brand ambassador for both Nissan and the Bank of Ireland. In April 2016 she launched the Sophie Spence Rugby Academy.

== Honours ==
=== Rugby union ===
Ireland

- Women's Six Nations Championship
  - Winners: 2013, 2015
- Grand Slam
  - Winners: 2013
- Triple Crown
  - Winners: 2013, 2015

Leinster

- IRFU Women's Interprovincial Series
  - Winners: 2013

Ireland Sevens

- Rugby Europe Women's Sevens Championships Plate
  - Winners: 2013

Individual

- Guinness Rugby Writers of Ireland Women's Player of the Year Award
  - 2015
