= Harriet Millar-Mills =

England international rugby union player

- Born: 16 April 1991 (age 35) Stockport, Greater Manchester
- Height: 1.78 m (5 ft 10 in)
- Weight: 84 kg (185 lb; 13 st 3 lb)
- Notable relative(s): Bridget Millar-Mills (sister); Elliot Millar-Mills (brother)

Rugby union career
- Position: Back Row
Senior career
Years	Team	Apps	(Points)
- Wasps Ladies
2014	Bristol		
2014	Firwood Waterloo		
2013	Lichfield		
International career
Years	Team	Apps	(Points)
2011–present	England	66	(50)
2011	England Women U20		
Medal record
Representing England
Women's rugby union
Rugby World Cup
Silver medal – second place	2017 Ireland	Team competition

Harriet Victoria Millar-Mills (born 16 April 1991) is an English rugby union player and a member of the England Women's Rugby team.

== International career ==
Millar-Mills made her debut for England in 2011 for the U20 team, before graduating to the senior team that year. In 2013 she played for the country in the 2013 Women's Six Nations Championships. In the game versus Scotland, she and her sister, Bridget Millar-Mills, were the first sisters ever to face each other in international rugby. Though both grew up in Manchester, Bridget chose to play for Scotland as their mother is from Hamilton.

Millar-Mills was named Old Mutual Wealth Player of the Match for England's 2016 game versus Canada. She played in all 12 of the England team's games that year, starting in ten.

In 2017 she was named in the 2017 Women's Rugby World Cup squad for England. In April 2021, she played for England in the team's 67–3 win over Italy, securing the country's place in the final of the 2021 Six Nations.

== Club career ==
Millar-Mills began her career as a child at Manchester RFC, before transferring to a team in Chester. She has since played for Lichfield in 2013, Firwood Waterloo in 2014 and the Bristol Bears Women in 2014. She signed to Wasps Ladies in 2017 and currently plays for the club.

== Personal life ==
Millar-Mills is the sister of Scottish national player Bridget Millar-Mills. Her brother Elliot Millar-Mills used to play for Wasps men's team. and plays for the Scottish National Rugby team.

She studied Sports Technology at Loughborough University. She is a maths teacher at Tudor Hall School.
