= Elliot Millar Mills =

Scotland international rugby union player

- Born: Elliot Millar Mills; 8 July 1992 (age 34) Stockport, England
- Height: 1.78 m (5 ft 10 in)
- Weight: 121 kg (19 st 1 lb; 267 lb)
- University: University College London
- Notable relative: Harriet Millar-Mills (sister)

Rugby union career
- Position: Tighthead Prop
Senior career
Years	Team	Apps	(Points)
2016–2017	Yorkshire Carnegie	7	(0)
2017–2018	Edinburgh Rugby	3	(0)
2018–2021	Ealing Trailfinders	44	(15)
2021–2022	Wasps	9	(0)
2023	Edinburgh Rugby	1	(0)
2023–2026	Northampton Saints	45	(0)
2026–	Newcastle Red Bulls	0	(0)
- Correct as of 3 January 2026
International career
Years	Team	Apps	(Points)
2024–	Scotland	16	(0)
- Correct as of 18 November 2026

Elliot Millar Mills (born 8 July 1992) is a rugby union player who currently plays for Newcastle Red Bulls in the English Premiership. He qualifies to play for the Scotland through his Scottish mother.

== Club career ==
Millar Mills first played for Manchester, Stockport and Macclesfield in his early career. He represented Cheshire in the 2016 County Championship losing to Cornwall 35-13 in the finals held at Twickenham Stadium. He also represented England Counties during their tour in Canada.

Millar Mills joined Yorkshire Carnegie permanently following a successful trial period. He left Leeds to join Scotland capital Edinburgh in the Pro14 ahead of the 2017-18 season. He made his senior debut for Edinburgh against local rivals Glasgow Warriors in a 17-0 loss in the 1872 Cup in December 2017.

On 18 April 2018, Millar Mills left Edinburgh to join Ealing Trailfinders in the RFU Championship ahead of the 2018-19 season. He made his debut for Ealing Trailfinders in a 7-20 loss against London Irish in the first Championship match of the new season. On 27 January 2021, Millar Mills makes his move up to the Premiership Rugby competition with Wasps from the 2021-22 season.

Wasps entered administration on 17 October 2022 and Millar Mills was made redundant along with all other players and coaching staff. At the start of the 2023/24 season he was signed to play for Northampton Saints. On 8 January 2026, Millar-Mills announced that he would leave Northampton for Premiership rivals Newcastle Red Bulls on a two-year contract from the 2026-27 season.

== International career ==
Millar Mills was called up to the Scotland squad for the 2024 Six Nations Championship and made his debut off the bench in a win against Wales. He made his first Scotland start in a 12-73 away win against Canada
