= 2012 Women's Six Nations Championship =

- Date: February 2012 – March 2012
- Countries: England; France; Ireland; Italy; Scotland; Wales

Tournament statistics
- Champions: England (13th title)
- Grand Slam: England (12th title)
- Triple Crown: England (15th title)
- Matches played: 15
- Tries scored: 71 (4.73 per match)
- Top point scorer: (England) Emily Scarratt (34)
- Top try scorer: (England) Michaela Staniford (5)

The 2012 Women's Six Nations Championship, also known as the 2012 RBS Women's Six Nations due to the tournament's sponsorship by the Royal Bank of Scotland, was the 11th series of the Women's Six Nations Championship, an annual women's rugby union competition between six European rugby union national teams. Matches were held in February and March 2012, on the same weekends as the men's tournament, if not always the same day.

The championship was contested by England, France, Ireland, Italy, Scotland and Wales. England were favourites to win the tournament, and did so – their victory being their seventh title in a row, winning without conceding a try – the first time this had been achieved in the Six Nations.

The tournament marked a significant step-forward in the broadcasting of matches. Three of England's five games were available to the armchair viewer – their home matches against Wales (broadcast live in the UK by the BBC), their game against Ireland (webcast by the RFU), and their away game against France (broadcast in France by France4 and in the UK by Sky – the first time any women's international had been shown on French national TV). Ireland v Scotland was also webcast by the IRFU – the first Irish women's home game ever broadcast. In addition Wales played at the Millennium Stadium for the first time, following the men's game between Wales and Italy, though this was not broadcast.

== Table ==
Position	Nation	Games				Points				Table points
Position	Nation	Played	Won	Drawn	Lost	For	Against	Difference	Tries	Table points
1	England	5	5	0	0	161	12	+149	26	10
2	France	5	4	0	1	97	22	+75	15	8
3	Ireland	5	3	0	2	109	41	+68	16	6
4	Wales	5	2	0	3	50	113	−63	8	4
5	Italy	5	1	0	4	55	157	−102	7	2
6	Scotland	5	0	0	5	12	139	−127	2	0

== Fixtures and results ==
=== Week 1 ===
2012-02-03

Ireland	Match abandoned (10–3)	Wales
Try: Miller; Conv: Briggs; Pen: Briggs		Pen: Prosser

Ashbourne RFC

2012-02-05

France	32–0	Italy
Tries: Ba 8'; Tremouliere 21'; Hebel 29'; Ladagnous 32'; Pelle 80'; Conv: Bailon 8', 29'; Pen: Bailon 19'

Stade Emile Pons, Riom
Referee: Claire Hodnett (England)

2012-02-05

Scotland	0–47	England
		Tries: Packer; Staniford (2); Burnfield; Merchant (2); Hunt; Scarratt; Noel-Smith; Conv: McLean

Lasswade
Referee: Sherry Trumbull

=== Week 2 ===
2012-02-11

France	8–7	Ireland
Try: Caroline Ladagnous 20'; Pen: Sandrine Agricole 38'		Try: Claire Molloy 78'; Conv: Niamh Briggs 78'

Stade du Hameau, Pau
Referee: Sherry Trumbull (Canada)

2012-02-12

Italy	3–43	England
Pen: Tondinelli		Tries: Clark; Scarratt; Roberts; Large; Penalty Try; Staniford; Burford; Convs: Scarratt (4)

Recco, Genoa

2012-02-12

Wales	20–0	Scotland
Tries: Amy Day (2); Jamie Kift; Rachael Taylor

Cross Keys

=== Week 3 ===
2012-02-24

Ireland	40–10	Italy
Tries: Niamh Kavanagh (2); Amy Davis; Marie Louise Reilly; Joy Neville; Jennifer Murphy; Cons: Niamh Briggs (4); Grace Davitt		Try: Cristina Molic; Con: Veronica Schiavon; Drop: Michela Tondinelli

Ashbourne RFC
Referee: Joyce Henry (Canada)

2012-02-25

England	33–0	Wales
Tries: Michaela Staniford (2); Emily Scarratt; Rowena Burnfield; Kay Wilson; Sarah Hunter; Pen:Katy McLean

Twickenham stadium
Referee: Sylvie Bros (France)

2012-02-25

Scotland	0–23	France
		Tries: Ba 20'; Bouisset 38'; Mignot 43'; De Nadai 60'; Pen: Bailon 33'

Stirling County
Referee: Federica Guerzoni (Italy)

=== Rearranged fixture ===
2012-03-03

Ireland	36–0	Wales
Tries: Joy Neville; Sophie Spence; Niamh Kavanagh; Alison Miller; Gillian Bourke; Ashleigh Baxter; Cons: Niamh Briggs (3)

Ashbourne RFC

=== Week 4 ===
2012-03-09

Ireland	20–0	Scotland
Tries: Sophie Spence 5'; Ashleigh Baxter; Alison Miller; Conv: Niamh Briggs 5'; Pen: Niamh Briggs

Ashbourne RFC
Referee: Sylvie Bros (FRA)

2012-03-10

Wales	30–13	Italy
Tries: Elen Evans; Clare Flowers; Naomi Thomas (2); Cons: Laura Prosser (2); Pens: Prosser (2)		Try: Michaela Esta; Con: Michela Tondinelli; Pens: Tondinelli (2)

Millennium Stadium, Cardiff

2012-03-11

France	3–15	England
Pen: Bailon		Tries: Scarratt; Wilson; Conv: McLean; Pen: Scarratt

Stade Charléty, Paris

=== Week 5 ===
2012-03-17

England	23–6	Ireland
Tries: McLean; Turner; Convs: McLean (2); Pens: McLean (2); Scarratt		Pens: Briggs (2)

Esher RFC

2012-03-18

Italy	29–12	Scotland
Tries: Furlan 8'; Gaudino 22'; Chindamo 38'; Castellarin 40+4'; Gai 78'; Conv Schiavon 38', 44'		Tries: Harris 55'; Dixon 72'; Conv: Ritchie 55'

Pagani Stadium, Rovato, near Brescia

2012-03-18

Wales	0–31	France
		Tries: Mignot (2); Forlani; Ladagnous; Portaries; Cons: Bailon; Tremouliere (2)

Cross Keys

== Leading scorers ==
=== Point scorers ===
Points	Name	Team	Notes
34	Emily Scarratt	England	4 tries, 4 cons, 2 pens
27	Niamh Briggs	Ireland	9 cons, 3 pens
25	Michaela Staniford	England	5 tries
22	Katy McLean	England	1 try, 4 cons, 3 pens
15	Aurelie Bailon	France	3 conv, 3 pen
15	Caroline Ladagnous	France	3 tries
15	Niamh Kavanagh	Ireland	3 tries
13	Aurelie Bailon	France	2 cons, 3 pens
11	Michela Tondinelli	Italy	1 con, 2 pen, 1 drop
