= Larissa Muldoon =

Ireland international rugby union player

- Born: 11 March 1991 (age 35) County Donegal, Ireland
- Height: 1.66 m (5 ft 5 in)
- Weight: 68 kg (150 lb)

Rugby union career
- Position: Scrumhalf
Senior career
| Years | Team | Apps | (Points) |
- Bristol Ladies
| – | Railway Union | | |
| – | Ulster Rugby | | |
International career
| Years | Team | Apps | (Points) |
| 2010-2021 | Ireland | 48 | (15) |

Larissa Muldoon (born 11 March 1991), from Cappry, County Donegal, is a former rugby union player for Railway Union, Ulster rugby and Ireland women's national rugby union team. Since 2023 she has worked as a coach with Connacht Rugby and the Ireland women's team.

Her first sport was Ladies' Gaelic football which she played for Donegal at Under-14 and Under-16 level, winning All-Ireland medals with both teams as a full-forward.

== Playing career ==
She made her debut for the Ireland women's rugby union team at the age of 19, just two years after taking up the sport.

She played for Ulster's U18s and seniors first and her selection for Ireland was prompted by the Cardiff Metropolitan University who sent a video of her in action to the Irish Rugby Football Union.

Muldoon was a member of the Ireland team that won its first ever Six Nations and Grand Slam in 2013 and also a member when they won the 2015 Women's Six Nations.

She also represented Ireland at the 2014 Women's Rugby World Cup held in France where they had a historic victory over New Zealand's Black Ferns and finished fourth.

She played for Ireland at the 2017 Women's Rugby World Cup.

In 2021 she was selected at scrum-half in the Irish women's Team of the Decade by the Front Row Union website. She has amassed 48 caps for the Ireland women's rugby union team but was unavailable for selection in 2021 due to injury.

== Honours ==
=== Ireland ===
- Women's Six Nations Championship - 2: 2013, 2015
- Grand Slam - 1: 2013
- Triple Crown - 2: 2013, 2015

=== Individual ===
- Front Row Union Irish Women's Team of the Decade 2010–2020

== Coaching career ==
Muldoon obtained a master's degree in Sports Management and Leadership from Cardiff Metropolitan University. She is a qualified teacher and coach. She worked as a Gaelic Games Development Officer for Dublin GAA in 2017 and from 2018 worked fulltime as a Development Officer for Leinster Rugby, specialising in promoting the game for girls and women. She has worked as head coach of Ireland Under-18s, Railway Union, Trinity College Dublin and Dublin City University and was Backs Coach of the Ireland Under-20s. In 2023 she participated in the Gallagher High Performance Academy during which time she joined the Ireland women's coaching team under Scott Bemand at 2023 WXV in Dubai.

She moved into full time coaching in 2023, becoming Connacht Rugby's representative in the IRFU Women's National Talent Squad pathway staff. In 2025 she served as Attack & Skills Coach for Ireland at the 2025 Women's Rugby World Cup. In 2026 she was appointed Connacht Women's Rugby Lead.
