= Karen Findlay =

British police officer and rugby coach

Karen Ross Findlay LVO KPM (born 1968) is a Scottish police officer, rugby coach and former international player who played for the Scotland women's national rugby union team. She coaches Harlequins Ladies who compete in the Women's Premiership. She won 85 caps for Scotland and captained the side 52 times. She was appointed Assistant Chief Constable for British Transport Police after serving as a temporary commander with the Metropolitan Police.

== Early life ==
Findlay was born in 1968 in Cullen, Moray, Scotland.

== Playing career ==
She went to university in Edinburgh and began playing rugby while she was there.

Her first international appearance was against Wales in 1996. She first captained Scotland in 2001. In 2005 she captained Scotland team for the 50th time. She retired in 2006 after playing in the IRB Rugby World Cup 2006 Canada, the third world cup she had represented Scotland at.

== Coaching career ==
She was head coach at Richmond Women and during ten seasons at the club they won five Premiership titles.

In January 2011 she was announced as the first female coach for Scotland women's team. In December 2012 she was appointed as under-16 women's head coach.

She became the coach at Aylesford Bulls Ladies in 2016. She remained as a coach as the club then formed a partnership with Harlequin F.C. to compete as Harlequins Ladies and in the Women's Premiership from 2017.

== Policing career ==
She had an important role in the police co-ordination team that worked on security for the Olympic Park during the 2012 games.

Findlay was appointed Lieutenant of the Royal Victorian Order (LVO) in the 2024 New Year Honours for services at the coronation and was also awarded the King's Police Medal (KPM).

Findlay was set to join the British Transport Police as an Assistant Chief Constable in 2024.However her offer of employment was withdrawn by the Chief Constable in August 2024.
