= Grace Davitt =

Irish female rugby union player

- Born: 25 December 1982 (age 43)
- Height: 1.63 m (5 ft 4 in)
- Weight: 64 kg (141 lb; 10 st 1 lb)

Rugby union career
- Position: Centre
Senior career
Years	Team	Apps	(Points)
- Cooke
International career
Years	Team	Apps	(Points)
2005-2014	Ireland		

Grace Davitt (born 25 December 1982) is an Irish female rugby union player and coach. She was in Ireland's 2014 Women's Rugby World Cup squad in France. She also played in two previous World Cup's in 2006 and 2010. Davitt was a member of the 2013 Women's Six Nations Championship team. She played for Ulster and Leinster, and has coached at Cooke RFC, Malone RFC and Queen's University RFC in the women's All-Ireland League. She was appointed backs coach of Ulster Women in July 2023.

Davitt is a Maintenance Technician.
