= Roz Crowley =

England international rugby union player

- Born: Rosemarie Crowley; 16 August 1987 (age 39)
- Height: 1.71 m (5 ft 7 1/2 in)
- Weight: 82 kg (181 lb; 12 st 13 lb)

Rugby union career
- Position: Prop
Senior career
Years	Team	Apps	(Points)
- Lichfield
International career
Years	Team	Apps	(Points)
2008–????	England	24	(20)
Medal record
Representing England
Women's rugby union
Rugby World Cup
Silver medal – second place	2010 England	Team competition

Rosemarie Crowley (born 16 August 1987) is an English rugby union player. She represented England at the 2010 Women's Rugby World Cup. England were runners-up, losing to New Zealand 10–13 in the final.
