= Laetitia Salles =

French rugby union player

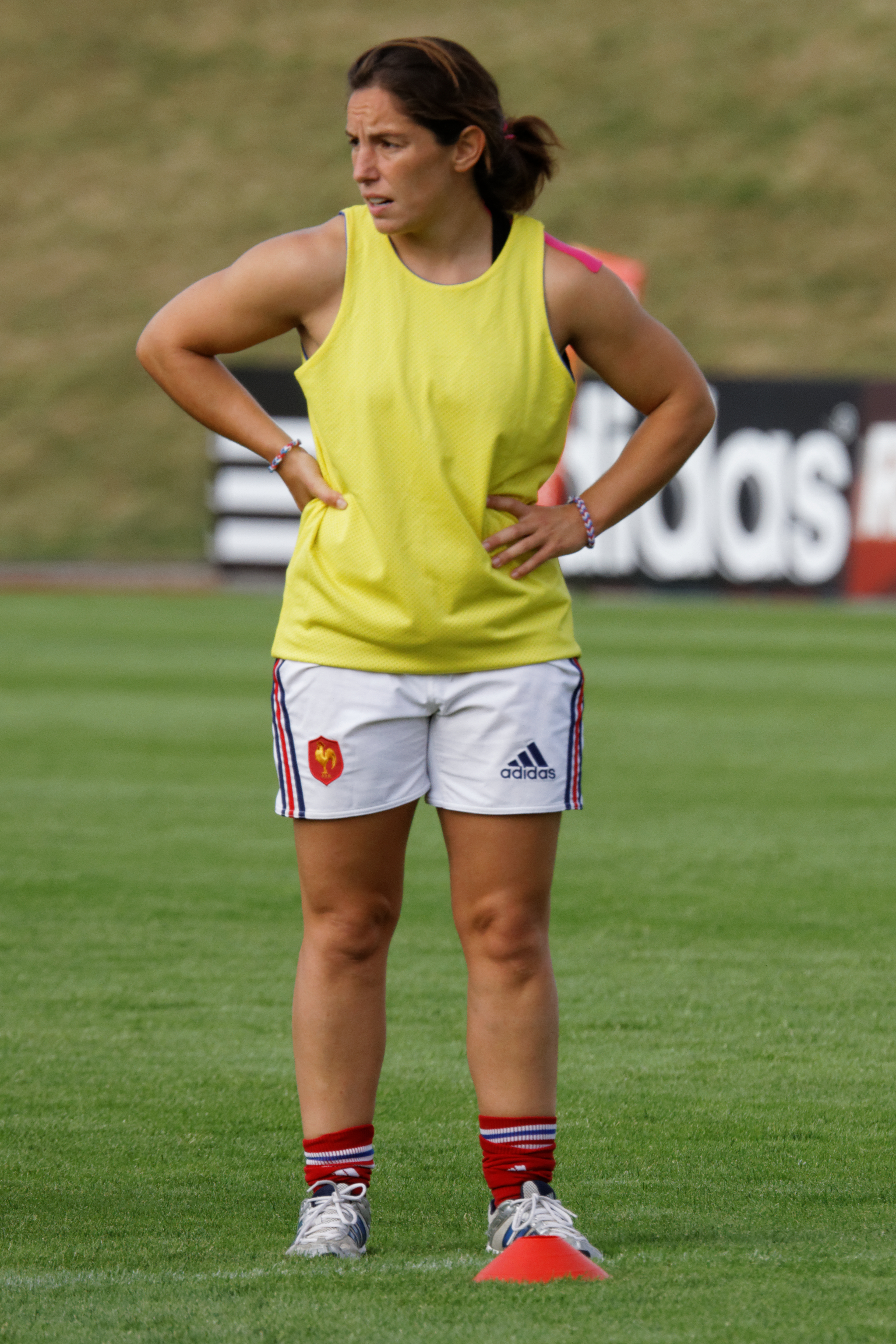
- Salles during 2014 Women's Rugby World Cup
- Born: 29 October 1982 (age 44)
- Height: 1.60 m (5 ft 3 in)
- Weight: 66 kg (146 lb; 10 st 6 lb)

Rugby union career
- Position: Hooker
Senior career
Years	Team	Apps	(Points)
2001-2012	USA Toulouges XV		
International career
Years	Team	Apps	(Points)
2003-2014	France	92	

Laetitia Salles (born 29 October 1982) is a French rugby union player. She represented France at the 2006 Women's Rugby World Cup, and the 2010 Women's Rugby World Cup. She was named in the squad for the 2014 Women's Rugby World Cup.
