= Jennifer Davies =

Welsh rugby union player

- Born: 11 March 1982 (age 44) Builth Wells, Wales
- Height: 157 cm (5 ft 2 in)
- Weight: 71 kg (11 st 3 lb)

Rugby union career
- Position: Prop
Senior career
Years	Team	Apps	(Points)
- Waterloo
International career
Years	Team	Apps	(Points)
2003-Present	Wales	55	

Jennifer Davies (born 11 March 1982) is a Welsh rugby union player. She plays prop for Wales and Waterloo. She was included in the squad to the 2010 Women's Rugby World Cup. She made her international debut in 2003.

In January 2013 she was selected in the Wales squad for 2013 Women's Six Nations Championship.
