= Fiona Hayes =

- Born: 13 September 1982 (age 44) County Limerick, Ireland
- Height: 1.65 m (5 ft 5 in)
- Weight: 81 kg (179 lb; 12 st 11 lb)
- University: University of Limerick

Rugby union career
- Position: Prop
Senior career
Years	Team	Apps	(Points)
2007–	UL Bohemians		
Provincial / State sides
Years	Team	Apps	(Points)
2009–	Munster		
International career
Years	Team	Apps	(Points)
2013–2016	Ireland	15	
Coaching career
- Years: Team
- 2013–: University College Cork

Fiona Hayes (born 13 September 1982) is an Irish former rugby union player. She was a member of the Ireland teams that won the 2013 and 2015 Women's Six Nations Championships, and that defeated New Zealand at the 2014 Women's Rugby World Cup. Hayes has also played association football at intervarsity and intermediate level.

== Early years and education ==
Hayes was raised in Limerick, growing up in the Woodview area of the city, near Thomond Park. In her youth see played association football and Gaelic football and also boxed. Hayes studied for a Master's degree at the University of Limerick.

== Association football ==
Hayes captained the University of Limerick team that won the 2005 WSCAI Intervarsities Cup. On 1 September 2013 she was also helped Douglas Hall win the WFAI Intermediate Cup.

== Rugby union ==
=== UL Bohemians ===
Hayes first started playing women's rugby union for UL Bohemians, at the age of 23, while studying for her Master's degree at the University of Limerick. In 2017 and 2018 Hayes captained UL Bohemians as they won successive All Ireland Division One titles.

=== Munster ===
Hayes has played for Munster in the IRFU Women's Interprovincial Series. She was first called up to the Munster squad in 2009. On 10 November 2017 Hayes also played for Munster against the Barbarians in the invitational team's first women's match.

=== Ireland international ===
Hayes made her debut for Ireland on 9 February 2013 when she came on as replacement in a 25–0 win against England. This was also the first time Ireland had defeated England. Hayes was subsequently a member of the Ireland teams that won the 2013 and 2015 Women's Six Nations Championships. She also represented Ireland at the 2014 Women's Rugby World Cup and was a member of the Ireland team that defeated New Zealand.

== Personal life ==
Hayes has worked as a youth worker in Cork.

== Honours ==
=== Rugby union ===
Ireland

- Women's Six Nations Championship
  - Winners: 2013, 2015: 2
- Grand Slam
  - Winners: 2013
- Triple Crown
  - Winners: 2013, 2015

Munster

- IRFU Women's Interprovincial Series
  - Winners: ?

UL Bohemians

- All Ireland Division One
  - Winners: 2017, 2018: 2

=== Association football ===
Douglas Hall

- WFAI Intermediate Cup
  - Winners: 2013: 1

University of Limerick

- WSCAI Intervarsities Cup
  - Winners: 2005: 1
