= Elodie Guiglion =

French rugby union player (born 1990)

- Born: 28 January 1990 (age 36)
- Height: 1.66 m (5 ft 5 1/2 in)
- Weight: 58 kg (128 lb; 9 st 2 lb)

Rugby union career
- Position: Wing
Senior career
Years	Team	Apps	(Points)
- USA Perpignan
International career
Years	Team	Apps	(Points)
2012	France	10	
National sevens team
Years	Team		Comps
- France

Elodie Guiglion (born 28 January 1990) is a French rugby union player. She represented France at the 2014 Women's Rugby World Cup. She was selected as a member of the France women's national rugby sevens team to the 2016 Summer Olympics.
