= Sandrine Agricole =

French rugby union player

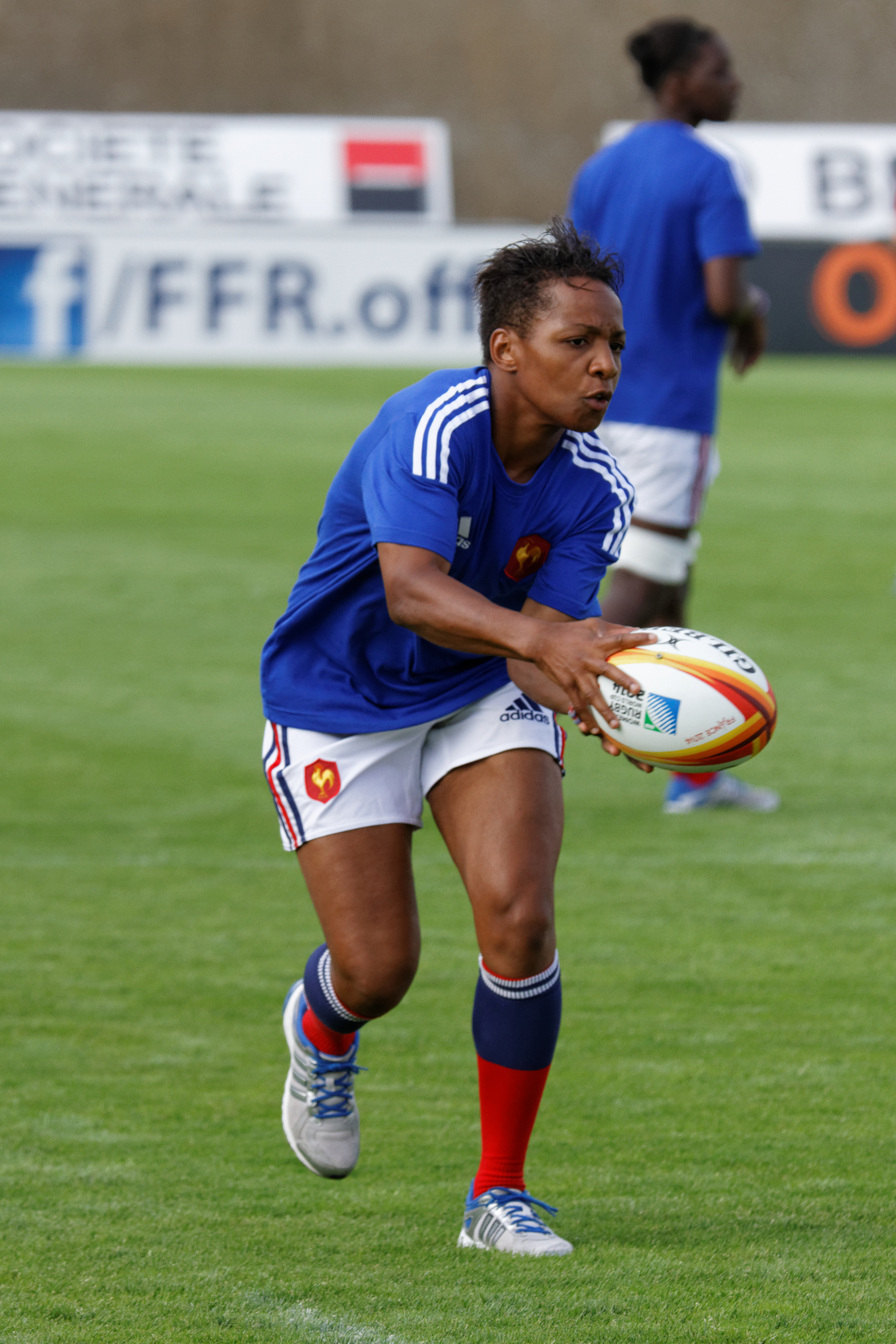
- Agricole at the 2014 World Cup.
- Born: 13 March 1980 (age 46)
- Height: 1.65 m (5 ft 5 in)
- Weight: 68 kg (150 lb; 10 st 10 lb)

Rugby union career
- Position: Centre
Senior career
Years	Team	Apps	(Points)
- Stade Rennais
International career
Years	Team	Apps	(Points)
2003–2014	France	44	

Sandrine Agricole (born 13 March 1980) is a French female rugby union player. She represented France at the 2010 and the 2014 Women's Rugby World Cup. In 2014, she was named in the World Cup Dream Team as flyhalf. Agricole started playing rugby when she was 11 years old.
