= Siobhan Fleming =

Irish rugby union player (born 1981)

- Born: 2 October 1981 (age 45)
- Height: 1.77 m (5 ft 9 1/2 in)
- Weight: 69 kg (152 lb; 10 st 12 lb)

Rugby union career
- Position: Loose forward
Senior career
Years	Team	Apps	(Points)
2010-Present	Munster	12	
2007-2010	Tralee		
International career
Years	Team	Apps	(Points)
2012-Present	Ireland	15	

Siobhan Fleming (born 2 October 1981) is an Irish rugby union player. She was a member of the Irish squad at the 2014 Women's Rugby World Cup. She first played rugby union for Tralee RFC in 2007. She was in Ireland's Grand Slam team that won the 2013 Women's Six Nations Championship.

Fleming is a Special Needs Assistant.
