= Jenny Murphy =

- Born: May 30, 1989 (age 37)
- Height: 1.77 m (5 ft 9 1/2 in)
- Weight: 83 kg (183 lb; 13 st 1 lb)
- University: St Mary’s University, Twickenham

Rugby union career
- Position: Centre
Senior career
Years	Team	Apps	(Points)
201x–201x	Old Belvedere		
Provincial / State sides
Years	Team	Apps	(Points)
201x–201x	Leinster		
International career
Years	Team	Apps	(Points)
- Ireland
National sevens team
Years	Team		Comps
- Ireland

Jenny Murphy (born May 30, 1989) is a female rugby union player for Ireland. She was a member of the Ireland's 2014 Women's Rugby World Cup squad. She also played at the 2013 Rugby World Cup Sevens in Moscow, Russia.

As a child Murphy played Gaelic football and soccer. She played with Ballymore Eustace GAA during her crucial player development years but in 2001 signed a controversial transfer to Kilcullen GAA. Despite this she is still regarded as a local treasure of Ballymore and notably in their top five best athletes.

At the start of the 2018/19 season, Murphy started coaching the inaugural Naas RFC Women's team alongside Leinster and Ireland U20's player Adam Coyle. The team were promoted from Leinster Women's League Division 4 to Division 3 in their breakthrough season.

Jenny is also a casual fill-in host for the SportsJOE.ie Baz and Andrew's House of Rugby Podcast starring former Munster and Ireland centre Barry Murphy alongside Ireland and Ulster back Andrew Trimble.
