= Ashleigh Orchard =

Ireland international rugby union player

- Born: 21 December 1991 (age 34)
- Height: 1.64 m (5 ft 5 in)
- Weight: 62 kg (137 lb)

Rugby union career
- Position: Fullback
Senior career
Years	Team	Apps	(Points)
- Belfast Harlequins
International career
Years	Team	Apps	(Points)
- Ireland

Ashleigh Orchard (née Baxter) (born 21 December 1991) is an Irish female rugby union player and coach. She has made 87 appearances for Ireland Sevens in the World Rugby Women's Sevens Series, and represented Ireland at the Women's Rugby World Cup in 2014 and 2017.

She began playing tag rugby before she joined a club in Lisburn; As of 2014, she played for Belfast Harlequins. For the 2022–23 season, she joined the Ulster Women's coaching team, and took a player-coach role at Cooke RFC. She was named Ulster Rugby Personality of the Year in the 2022 Ulster Rugby Awards.

She studied Aerospace engineering at Queen's University Belfast. She represented Ireland at the 2024 Summer Olympics in Paris.
