= Ailis Egan =

- Born: 4 February 1984 (age 42)
- Height: 1.72 m (5 ft 7 1/2 in)
- Weight: 89 kg (196 lb)

Rugby union career
- Position: Prop
Senior career
Years	Team	Apps	(Points)
- Old Belvedere
International career
Years	Team	Apps	(Points)
	Ireland	46	

Ailis Egan (born 4 February 1984) is a retired female rugby union player. She played Prop for Ireland, Old Belvedere and provincially for Leinster. She was a member of the Irish team to the 2014 Women's Rugby World Cup. She scored a try against the United States in their 23–17 win in the pool games at the 2014 World Cup.

Egan attended Trinity College Dublin, where she first started playing rugby.
