= Heather O'Brien =

- Born: 22 July 1984 (age 42) Churchtown, North Cork
- Height: 1.69 m (5 ft 6 1/2 in)
- Weight: 70 kg (150 lb; 11 st 0 lb)

Rugby union career
- Position: Loose forward
Senior career
Years	Team	Apps	(Points)
- Highfield
International career
Years	Team	Apps	(Points)
- Ireland

Heather O'Brien (born 22 July 1984) is a female Irish rugby union player. She was in Ireland's 2014 Women's Rugby World Cup squad. She scored a try in Ireland's victory over the Black Ferns at the 2014 World Cup.

O'Brien studied Physiotherapy at Queen Margaret University. She runs her own clinic, the North Cork Physiotherapy & Acupuncture Clinic, in Mallow, County Cork. She was awarded the Evening Echo Ladies Sportstar of the Month for August 2014.
