= Laura Guest =

- Born: 24 April 1985 (age 41)
- Height: 1.73 m (5 ft 8 in)
- Weight: 167 kg (368 lb; 26 st 4 lb)

Rugby union career
Senior career
| Years | Team | Apps | (Points) |
- Highfield
International career
| Years | Team | Apps | (Points) |
| 2004-Present | Ireland | 39 | |

Laura Guest (born 24 April 1985) is an Irish rugby union player. She was a member of the Irish squad to the 2014 Women's Rugby World Cup. She also played at the 2006 and 2010 Women's Rugby World Cup. Guest was also part of the team that won the 2013 Women's Six Nations Championship.

Guest is a teacher by profession. In 2013, she received the West Cork Sports Star of the Year Award.
