= Marie Louise Reilly =

- Born: 1 April 1980 (age 46) Leeds, England
- Height: 1.94 m (6 ft 4 1/2 in)
- Weight: 85 kg (187 lb; 13 st 5 lb)

Rugby union career
- Position: Lock
Senior career
Years	Team	Apps	(Points)
- Old Belvedere
International career
Years	Team	Apps	(Points)
2010-Present	Ireland	54	

Marie Louise Reilly (born 1 April 1980) is an Irish female rugby union player from Summerhill, County Meath. She played Lock for Ireland at the 2010, 2014, and 2017 Women's World cup. In 2014, Reilly was named to the tournament Dream Team. She retired from international rugby in 2017 after the Women's Rugby World Cup with 54 caps for Ireland.

== Rugby career ==
She first began playing rugby union in 2005. Reilly made her international debut in 2010.

Reilly is a Sports Development Officer with the Dublin City Council.
