= Niamh Briggs =

Irish rugby union player

- Born: Niamh Briggs; 30 September 1984 (age 42)
- Height: 1.7 m (5 ft 7 in)
- Weight: 80 kg (180 lb; 12 st 8 lb)
- School: St Augustine's College, Dungarvan
- University: Waterford Institute of Technology; Garda Síochána College; University of Limerick
- Occupation: Garda Síochána officer

Rugby union career
- Position: Full back / Out half
Senior career
Years	Team	Apps	(Points)
2005–08	Dungarvan		
2008–10	Clonmel		
2010–	UL Bohemians		
Provincial / State sides
Years	Team	Apps	(Points)
2007–	Munster	22+	
International career
Years	Team	Apps	(Points)
2008–	Ireland	57+	
National sevens team
Years	Team		Comps
2013–	Ireland 7s		
- Gaelic games career
- Sport: Ladies' Gaelic football
- Position: Forward
Club
- Years: Club
- Old Parish (Dungarvan)
Inter-county
- Years: County
- 2003–2010: Waterford

Niamh Briggs (born 30 September 1984) is a former Ireland women's rugby union international. She represented Ireland at the 2010 and 2014 Women's Rugby World Cups. She was also a member of the Ireland teams that won the 2013 and 2015 Women's Six Nations Championships. Briggs was a member of the first Ireland teams to defeat France, England and New Zealand. She was captain of the Ireland team when they won the 2015 Six Nations title and was the top points scorer during both the 2013 and 2015 Six Nations championships. Briggs is also an Ireland women's rugby sevens international and has also played senior ladies' Gaelic football for Waterford. Briggs is a Garda Síochána officer based in Limerick.

She resigned from An Garda Síochána in June 2024.

== Early years, family and education ==
Briggs grew up in the Abbeyside, Ballinacourty and Dungarvan areas of County Waterford. She is the daughter of Geraldine and Michael Briggs. Her mother is a nurse and her father worked in the pharmaceutical industry. She was raised in a sporting family. Her brothers, Shane and Liam, both played Gaelic football for Waterford. Shane captained the senior team. Her sister Roisin also represented Munster at field hockey. In her youth Briggs played field hockey and Gaelic football as well as entering athletics competitions. She completed her secondary level education at St Augustine's College, Dungarvan and sat for her Leaving Cert in 2003. Between 2004 and 2008 she attended the Waterford Institute of Technology where she gained a BA in Exercise and Health Studies. As of 2018–19 Briggs is attending the University of Limerick where she is studying Sports Psychology.

== Ladies' Gaelic football ==
=== Clubs ===
Briggs played ladies' Gaelic football at club level for Old Parish.

=== Inter-County ===
Briggs played for Waterford at the senior inter-county level. In 2005 she played in the Munster Senior Championship final against Cork at Páirc Uí Rinn. On 9 July 2009 Briggs scored 2–3, including a 30-metre point, as she helped Waterford defeat Clare 2–14 to 2–10 as they won the Munster Intermediate Championship final. In 2010 she played for Waterford in two further Intermediate finals. On 3 July she played in the Munster Intermediate Championship final as Waterford defeated Limerick. On 26 September she also played for Waterford in the 2010 All-Ireland Intermediate Ladies' Football Championship final. Waterford played a Donegal team that included Briggs' Ireland women's rugby union international teammate, Nora Stapleton.

== Rugby union ==
=== Clubs ===
Briggs first began playing women's rugby union while attending Waterford Institute of Technology. She subsequently played ten-a-side with Dungarvan before making the move in 2008 to the senior game with Clonmel. In 2010 she joined UL Bohemians after transferring to Limerick with the Garda Síochána.

=== Munster ===
Briggs has played for Munster in the IRFU Women's Interprovincial Series. She was recruited by Munster in 2007 after being spotted playing tag rugby by then Munster U21 manager, Kate McCarthy. She was subsequently a prominent member of the Munster teams that won the Interpro title in 2007, 2008, 2009, 2010 and 2012. In 2015 she was named captain of the Munster team.

=== Ireland international ===
Briggs made her debut for Ireland on 1 February 2008 against Italy. Briggs subsequently represented Ireland at the 2010 and 2014 Women's Rugby World Cups. She was also a member of the Ireland teams that won the 2013 and 2015 Women's Six Nations Championships.

During the 2009 Women's Six Nations Championship, Briggs was a member of the first Ireland team to defeat France. In 2013 Briggs was a prominent member of the Ireland team that won their first ever Six Nations, Grand Slam and Triple Crown titles. Briggs scored three tries and kicked 28 points and finished the championship as the top points scorer with 43. This included a try, a conversion and a penalty as Ireland defeated England 25–0 on 9 February. This was Ireland's first-ever win against England. Ireland secured the Grand Slam and with a 6–3 away win against Italy on Saint Patrick's Day. Two penalties from Briggs gave Ireland their fifth win in a row. Briggs was subsequently named the Guinness Rugby Writers of Ireland Women's Player of the Year for 2013.

At the 2014 Women's Rugby World Cup she was a member of the first Ireland team to defeat New Zealand. She scored two conversions and a penalty and set up a try for Alison Miller as Ireland won 17–14 She was named to the tournament Dream Team.

Briggs was later named the Ireland Women's Player of the Year for a second successive year. Briggs captained the Ireland team that won the 2015 Women's Six Nations Championship and again finished the championship as the top points scorer, this time with 49.

Briggs did not feature in the 2017 Six Nations due to a hamstring injury. She recovered from this injury and was initially included in the 2017 Women's Rugby World Cup squad. However she then had to withdraw from this squad because of an Achilles tendon injury. Briggs returned to the national team for the 2018 Six Nations.

Briggs has played for the Ireland women's national rugby sevens team in several tournaments, including the 2013 European Women's Sevens Grand Prix Series and the Kazan Tournament during the 2016 Rugby Europe Women's Sevens Grand Prix Series.

== Garda Síochána officer ==
Briggs was a Community Garda Síochána officer based at Roxboro Road Garda Station in Limerick. She graduated from Garda Síochána College in 2010. In her role as a community officer, she has regularly organised rugby union and association football training sessions at Garryowen Football Club for children from local housing estates. In both 2013 and 2015 Briggs received the Coiste Siamsa award. The award is presented to Gardaí who have achieved success in their chosen sports and is presented by the Garda Commissioner. In 2013 she received she received the award from Martin Callinan and in 2015 she received it from Nóirín O'Sullivan.

She is no longer a member of An Garda Síochána, having resigned in June 2024

== Honours ==
=== Rugby union ===
Ireland

- Women's Six Nations Championship
  - Winners: 2013, 2015
- Grand Slam
  - Winners: 2013
- Triple Crown
  - Winners: 2013, 2015

Munster

- IRFU Women's Interprovincial Series
  - Winners: 2007, 2008, 2009, 2010, 2012: 5

Individual

- Guinness Rugby Writers of Ireland Women's Player of the Year Award
  - 2013, 2014
- Coiste Siamsa Award
  - 2013, 2015

Ireland Sevens

- Rugby Europe Women's Sevens Championships Plate
  - Winners: 2013

=== Gaelic football ===
Waterford

- All-Ireland Intermediate Ladies' Football Championship
  - Runners up: 2010
- Munster Intermediate Ladies' Football Championship
  - Winners: 2009, 2010
- Munster Senior Ladies' Football Championship
  - Runners up: 2005
