= Élodie Poublan =

French rugby union player

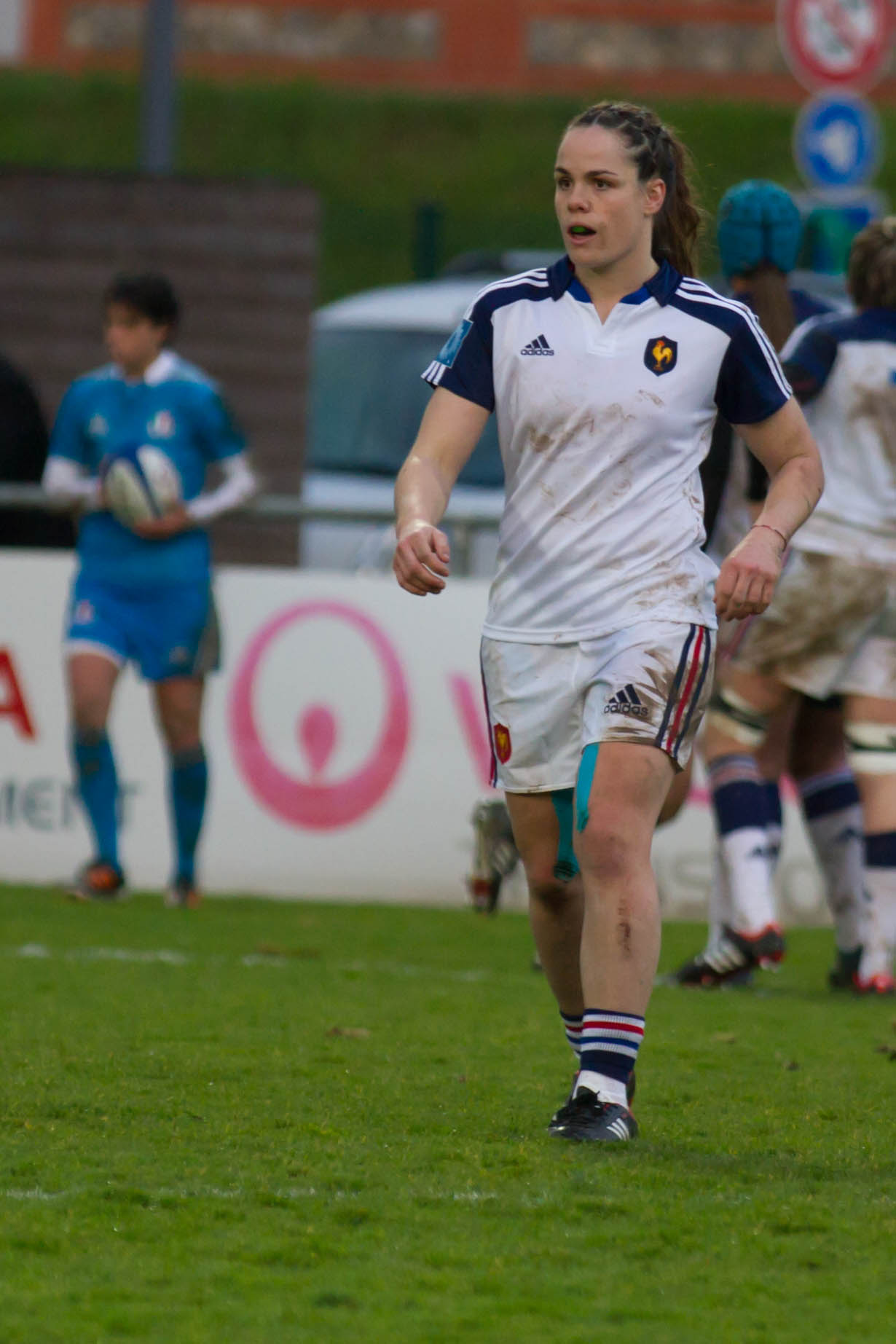
- Élodie Poublan at the 2014 Women's Six Nations Championship
- Born: 13 April 1989 (age 37)
- Height: 1.66 m (5 ft 5 1/2 in)
- Weight: 72 kg (159 lb; 11 st 5 lb)

Rugby union career
- Position(s): Centre, fullback
International career
Years	Team	Apps	(Points)
-	France	16	(-)

Élodie Poublan (born 13 April 1989 in Pau) is a rugby union player. She represented France at the 2010 Women's Rugby World Cup and was named in the squad to the 2014 Women's Rugby World Cup. She plays for Montpellier HRC.
