= Vikki McGinn =

- Born: March 31, 1985 (age 41)
- Height: 1.7 m (5 ft 7 in)
- Weight: 76 kg (168 lb; 12 st 0 lb)

Rugby union career
- Position(s): Wing, Fullback
Senior career
Years	Team	Apps	(Points)
- Blackrock
International career
Years	Team	Apps	(Points)
- Ireland

Vikki McGinn (born March 31, 1985) is an Irish female rugby union player. She played at the 2014 Women's Rugby World Cup for Ireland. She replaced Niamh Kavanagh who was ruled out of the World Cup due to injury.
