= Alison Miller (rugby union) =

- Born: 30 October 1984 (age 42)
- Height: 1.65 m (5 ft 5 in)
- Weight: 72 kg (159 lb)
- University: Waterford IT

Rugby union career
- Position: Wing
Senior career
Years	Team	Apps	(Points)
- Portlaoise
- Old Belvedere
Provincial / State sides
Years	Team	Apps	(Points)
- Connacht
International career
Years	Team	Apps	(Points)
201x–201x	Ireland		

Alison Miller (born 30 October 1984) is a rugby union player. She was a member of Ireland's 2014 Women's Rugby World Cup squad. She scored a try in their memorable victory over the Black Ferns at the 2014 World Cup.

Miller began playing rugby union while attending Waterford IT.
