= Caroline Ladagnous =

French rugby union player

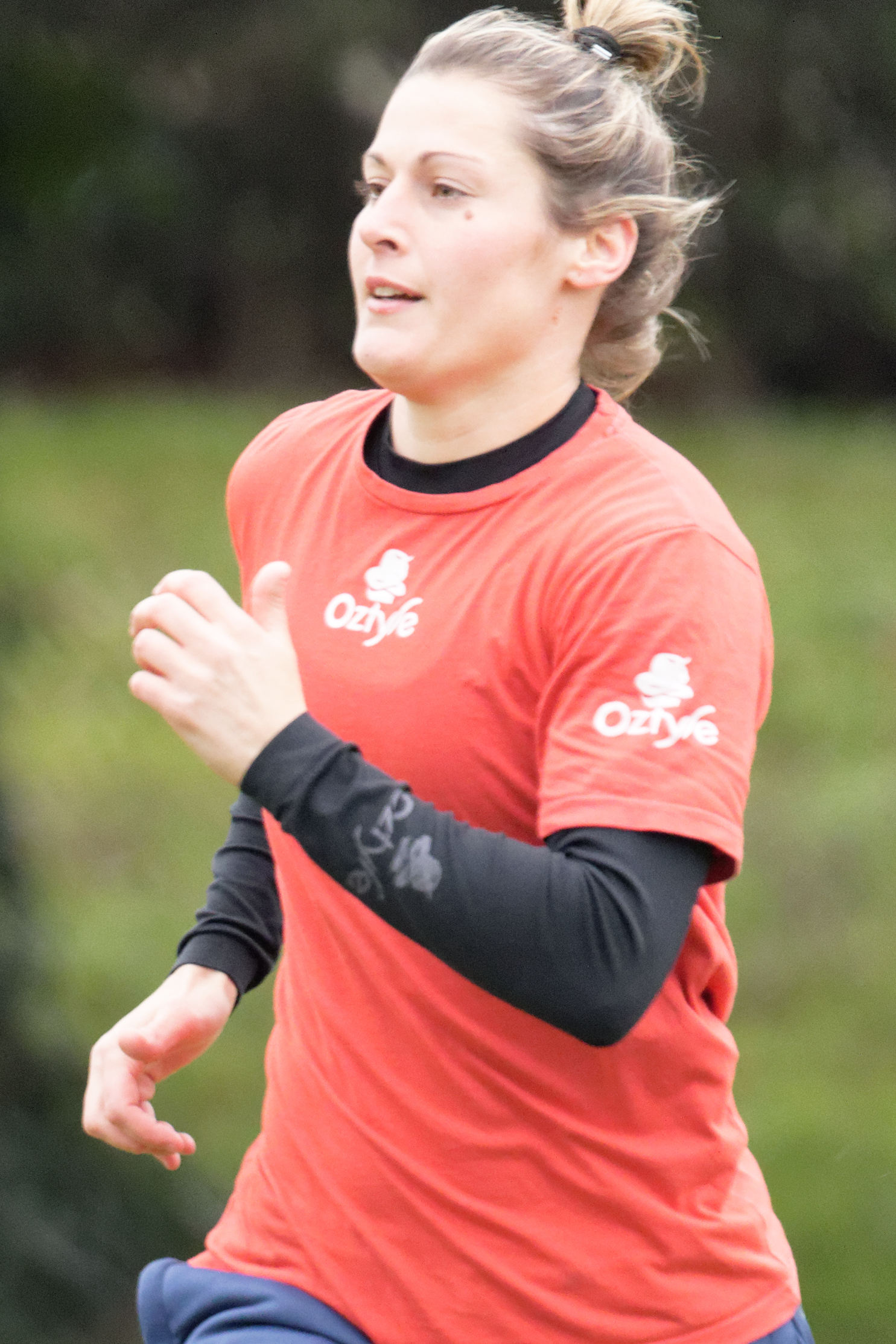
- Born: 22 September 1988 (age 38)
- Height: 1.72 m (5 ft 8 in)
- Weight: 64 kg (141 lb)

Rugby union career
- Position(s): Wing, Fullback
Senior career
Years	Team	Apps	(Points)
2014–	AC Bobigny 93 rugby		(0)
International career
Years	Team	Apps	(Points)
2008–	France	52	(0)
National sevens team
Years	Team		Comps
- France

Caroline Ladagnous (born 22 September 1988) is a French rugby union player. She represented France at the 2010 Women's Rugby World Cup. She was named in the squad to the 2014 Women's Rugby World Cup

Ladagnous was named in the French women's sevens team for the 2016 Summer Olympics.

She is the sister of retired racing cyclist Mathieu Ladagnous.
