= Claire Hodnett =

English rugby union referee and solicitor

Claire Hodnett is an English rugby union referee and solicitor. She was the first woman to be appointed to the Rugby Football Union's national panel of referees and was the first woman to be a TMO at a men's rugby premiership game.

Hodnett was born in Shrewsbury. She played rugby at university level but stopped after having to have two knee operations due to weight issues. She became interested in becoming a referee after seeing a female referee at her local rugby club.

In 2014, she became the first woman to be appointed to the Rugby Football Union's national panel of referees.

In 2017, Hodnett became the first female referee to be a TMO at a men's rugby premiership game which took place at Kingston Park in Newcastle.

She was a referee at the 2014 Women's Rugby World Cup and the 2017 Women's Rugby World Cup.

She also works as a solicitor, specialising in childcare and child protection.
