= Gillian Bourke =

- Born: 28 August 1984 (age 42) Limerick
- Height: 1.64 m (5 ft 4 1/2 in)
- Weight: 80 kg (180 lb; 12 st 8 lb)

Rugby union career
- Position: Hooker/Prop
Senior career
Years	Team	Apps	(Points)
2007-2018	Munster	46	
2003-2018	UL Bohemians		
2018-2019	Stade Français Paris		
2019 - 2020	Harlequins		
2020 – present	Loughborough Lightning		
International career
Years	Team	Apps	(Points)
2008 – present	Ireland	51	

Gillian Bourke (born 28 August 1984) is a female rugby union player. She represented Ireland at the 2010 and 2014 Women's Rugby World Cup, where she was voted the Number 2 position in the WRWC Team of the Tournament.

She has 51 caps for Ireland, playing from 2008 to 2015, winning the Six Nations Grand Slam in 2013, and the Six Nations Championship in 2015.

She was also invited to play with the legendary Barbarians team in February 2018 against the British Army, and again in April 2019 against the USA Women's National team in Denver, Colorado. She was voted Munster Women's Player of the Year for the 2017–18 season.

In August 2019, she moved from her club Stade Francais in Paris to join Tyrrell's Premier 15s giants Harlequins.

Bourke studied Sport Science at the University of Limerick. She is a performance analyst.

She works as a Game Analyst with World Rugby.
