= 2014 Women's Rugby World Cup final =

Final tournament match

2014 Women's Rugby World Cup Final
- Event: 2014 Women's Rugby World Cup
England	Canada
(England)	(Canada)
21	9
- Date: 14 August 2014
- Venue: Stade Jean-Bouin, Paris
- Player of the Match: Emily Scarratt
- Referee: Amy Perrett (Australia)
- Attendance: 20,000

The 2014 Women's Rugby World Cup Final was the final match of the 2014 Women's Rugby World Cup, played between former champions England and first-time finalists Canada on 14 August 2014 at Stade Jean-Bouin in Paris. England won the game and the World Cup for a second time, beating Canada 21–9.

== Route to the final ==
England
Round
Canada
Opponent
Result
Pool stage
Opponent
Result
Samoa
65–3
Match 1
Spain
31–7
Spain
45–5
Match 2
Samoa
42–7
Canada
13–13
Match 3
England
13–13

Team	Pld	W	D	L	TF	PF	PA	+/−	BP	Pts
England	3	2	1	0	17	123	21	+102	2	12
Canada	3	2	1	0	12	86	25	+61	2	12
Spain	3	1	0	2	8	51	81	−30	1	5
Samoa	3	0	0	3	2	15	148	−133	0	0

Final standing

Team	Pld	W	D	L	TF	PF	PA	+/−	BP	Pts
England	3	2	1	0	17	123	21	+102	2	12
Canada	3	2	1	0	12	86	25	+61	2	12
Spain	3	1	0	2	8	51	81	−30	1	5
Samoa	3	0	0	3	2	15	148	−133	0	0

Opponent
Result
Knockout stage
Opponent
Result
Ireland
40–7
Semi-finals
France
18–16

This was the first instance in which both finalists had been drawn together in the pool stage.

The teams were both drawn in Pool A and ran riot over their opposition Spain and Samoa. Canada played their first game against Spain on 1 August and a hat-trick from Magali Harvey gave the Canadians a 31–7 victory. England played only their second ever game against Samoa later the same day. They started slow and early in the match, scrum half Natasha Hunt was overturned onto her head by Samoan fullback Soteria Pulumu, which resulted in Pulumu being sent off, the first red card in a Women's World Cup. Emily Scarratt then gave England first points before Katherine Merchant scored their famous first try. Merchant would then become one of four players to score twice along with the recovered Hunt, and wingers Lydia Thompson and Kay Wilson to give the former champions a 65–3 win. Four days later on 5 August, Canada and England defeated Samoa and Spain 42–7 and 45–5 respectively, playing in a similar fashion, both teams scoring five tries from five different scorers.

Having the superior historical form, superior scorelines against Spain and Samoa, as well as their most recent outing with Canada being a comfortable 32–9 win, England were favourites to take the final match of the pool on 9 August. Canada had the confidence with their first and second wins over England in the 2013 Nations Cup. England scored early on with a penalty from Emily Scarratt, with a quick response from a Canadian try of Karen Paquin, with Magali Harvey's conversion missed. The score remained 3–5 until another Scarratt penalty in stoppage time; England leading 6–5 at half-time. Canada scored another quick try in the second half from Kayla Mack, again unconverted from Harvey. Scarratt however was able to convert the try of vice-captain Sarah Hunter to take the lead back for England a third time, before Harvey's late penalty brought the scores level. What was to follow would become controversial over forthcoming years. England were awarded a penalty again in stoppage time that was easily kickable to the posts, the teams however discussed the decision, and agreed England should kick the ball into touch for a draw instead of over the posts for a win. This was after defending four-time champions New Zealand were upset by Ireland four days earlier. By drawing the game, the Black Ferns would be eliminated with both England and Canada going through with Ireland and hosts France. Had England gone for the posts, this would have meant New Zealand would have gone through instead of Canada, which both teams did not desire as Canada would have been knocked out and England had been beaten by New Zealand in the last three finals. In the tournament, the draw resulted in New Zealand being knocked out of the tournament for the first time since losing to the United States in the semi-finals in 1991, as well as guaranteeing new finalists as England were the only former finalists that had qualified for the 1st-4th semi-finals. Outside of the tournament, along with Canada failing to qualify for the 1st-4th semi-finals in 2017, the draw resulted in the format being changed for the 2021 tournament so that there would be quarter-finals preceding the semi-finals.

With the teams drawing, they were seeded 3rd and 4th overall, with England playing 2nd ranked Ireland, and Canada against 1st ranked France. Having only ever lost one out of their six semi-finals and being against Ireland who hadn't yet played one, England were predicted to win the game despite their recent form against the Irish which had dwindled in recent games. England were not seen to be outright favourites as Ireland had recently beaten New Zealand for the first time and won the Grand Slam in the Six Nations the previous year. Canada had the much harder task of defeating the current Six Nations Grand Slam champions France. With the Black Ferns gone, France were new favourites along with England having claimed the Grand Slam for the first time since 2005. The semi-finals commenced on 14 August, with England playing Ireland first. Ireland fielded the exact same side that beat the Black Ferns and pressurised England until scoring first after quarter of an hour. England however, took cruise control and replied with 40 unanswered points with tries from Rochelle Clark, Katherine Merchant, Kay Wilson and two from Marlie Packer; a performance that seemed like those England had previously put over Ireland. In the other game, Canada came out mostly second-best against the hosts. This was until an end-to-end solo effort from Magali Harvey, an effort that would win her the IRB Women's Player of the Year and subsequently Women's Try of the Decade. France responded but Canada held on to win, their second consecutive win over France in France, and made their first final, resulting in France's sixth successive semi-final defeat. England meanwhile entered their fourth successive final, and sixth overall.

== Match ==
14 August 2014
18:45 CEST (UTC+02:00)

England	21–9	Canada
Try: Waterman 33' m Scarratt 74' c Con: Scarratt (1/2) 75'; Pen: Scarratt (3/3) 10', 25', 60'	Report	Pen: Harvey (3/3) 40' +2, 46', 49'

Stade Jean-Bouin, Paris
Referee: Amy Perrett (Australia)

FB	15	Danielle Waterman	47' to 52'
RW	14	Katherine Merchant			(substituted off) 70'
OC	13	Emily Scarratt
IC	12	Rachael Burford	(substituted off) 78'
LW	11	Kay Wilson
FH	10	Katy McLean (c)
SH	9	Natasha Hunt	(substituted off) 78'
N8	8	Sarah Hunter
OF	7	Margaret Alphonsi
BF	6	Marlie Packer	(substituted off) 65'
RL	5	Joanna McGilchrist	(substituted off) 54'
LL	4	Tamara Taylor
TP	3	Sophie Hemming	(substituted off) 54'
HK	2	Victoria Fleetwood	(substituted off) 58'
LP	1	Rochelle Clark
Replacements:
HK	16	Emma Croker	(substituted on) 58'
PR	17	Laura Keates	(substituted on) 54'
LK	18	Rebecca Essex	(substituted on) 54'
FL	19	Alex Matthews	(substituted on) 65'
SH	20	La Toya Mason	(substituted on) 78'
FH	21	Ceri Large	(substituted on) 78'
CE	22	Claire Allan	(substituted on) 47'	(substituted off) 52'	(substituted on) 70'
Coach:
(England) Gary Street

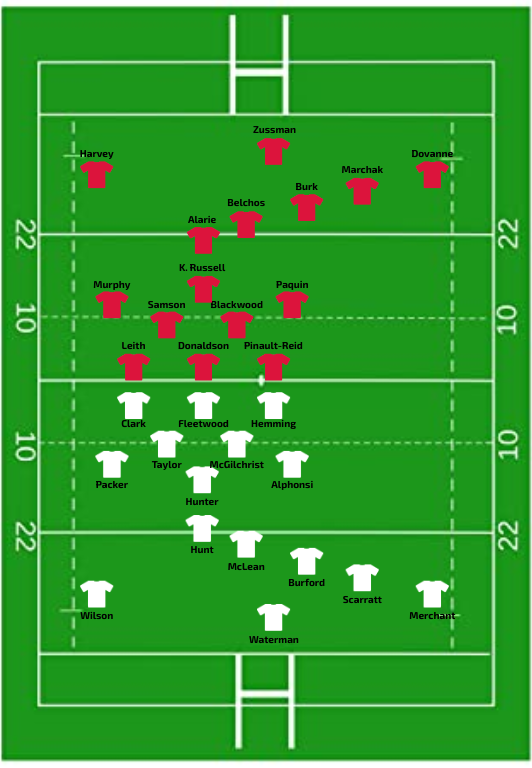

FB	15	Julianne Zussman	(substituted off) 76'
RW	14	Magali Harvey
OC	13	Mandy Marchak
IC	12	Andrea Burk
LW	11	Jessica Dovanne	(substituted off) 60'
FH	10	Emily Belchos
SH	9	Elissa Alarie
N8	8	Kelly Russell (c)
OF	7	Karen Paquin
BF	6	Jacey Murphy
RL	5	Maria Samson	(substituted off) 40'
LL	4	Latoya Blackwood
TP	3	Hilary Leith	(substituted off) 70'
HK	2	Kim Donaldson	(substituted off) 46'
LP	1	Marie-Pier Pinault-Reid	(substituted off) 78'
Replacements:
HK	16	Laura Russell	(substituted on) 46'
PR	17	Olivia DeMerchant	(substituted on) 70'
PR	18	Mary Jane Kirby	(substituted on) 78'
LK	19	Tyson Beukeboom
SH	20	Kayla Mack	(substituted on) 40'
FH	21	Julia Sugawara	(substituted on) 76'
CE	22	Brittany Waters	(substituted on) 60'
Coach:
(France) Francois Ratier

Player of the Match:
Emily Scarratt (England)

Touch judges:
Nicky Inwood (New Zealand)
Alex Pratt (Scotland)
Television match official:
Eric Gauzins (France)

=== Summary ===
England were favourites for that reason, and they dominated the entire game with two Emily Scarratt penalties before Karen Paquin prevented tries from Katherine Merchant and Natasha Hunt. England however did score when Canadian skipper Kelly Russell was fooled by a Tamara Taylor dummy, giving England an overlap sending Danielle Waterman into score their first try. Scarratt's conversion went bizarrely wide but England still had a healthy 11–0 lead. Magali Harvey then scored a penalty before halftime to make the score 11–3. Harvey then continued to chip away at England's lead after the break to narrow the gap to two points, 11–9. England then entered cruise control as they did against Ireland first with a response from Scarratt restoring the score to 14–9. In the last quarter, play was mostly contested in England's half, but a miscommunication between centres Rachael Burford and Scarratt confused both England's attack and Canada's defence, allowing Scarratt to break several lines to score the winner. She comfortably converted to put England twelve points clear with five minutes left. England won their second Women's Rugby World Cup, their first in twenty years, and their third overall Rugby World Cup triumph.

England captain Katy McLean dedicated the win to the England legends who fell short in recent years. Both captains complimented each other's performances and marked the game as steps as journeys both teams started long ago, with it being England's end.

Maggie Alphonsi, Sophie Hemming and Joanna McGilchrist all retired from international rugby. Katherine Merchant suffered multiple concussions which would lead to her retirement before being able to play another international game. Most other England players would take up the sevens game before returning to rugby union after the 2016 Olympics to win their first Six Nations since the winning the World Cup in 2017. England captain Katy McLean and vice-captain Sarah Hunter received MBEs at the 2014 New Years Honours. Gary Street stepped down as head coach, having been in charge since 2006, to coach Aylesford Bulls Ladies to win in the 2015–16 Women's Premiership, and continued when the club evolved into Harlequins Women.
