= 2014 Women's Rugby World Cup squads =

2014 World Cup squads
Tournament details
- Host nation: 2014 World Cup squads
- Dates: 1 August – 17 August 2014
- No. of nations: 12

This article lists the official squads for the 2014 Women's Rugby World Cup in France.

== Pool A ==
=== Canada ===
Head Coach: (Canada) Francois Ratier

Note: Flags indicate national union for the club/province as defined by World Rugby.

Player	Position	Date of birth (age)	Caps	Club/province
Kim Donaldson	Hooker	24 August 1983		(British Columbia) Burnaby Lake Rugby Club
Mary Jane Kirby	Hooker	20 July 1989		(Ontario) Highland RFC
Olivia DeMerchant	Prop	16 February 1991		(New Brunswick) Woodstock Wildmen RUFC
Hilary Leith	Prop	29 December 1983		(British Columbia) Capilano RFC
Marie-Pier Pinault-Reid	Prop	20 December 1988		CR Quebec
Laura Russell	Prop	10 November 1988		(Ontario) Toronto Nomads
Tyson Beukeboom	Lock	10 March 1991		(Ontario) Aurora Barbarians RFC
Latoya Blackwood	Lock	19 August 1985		(Quebec) Sainte-Anne-de-Bellevue RC
Kayla Mack	Lock	9 May 1989		(Saskatchewan) Wild Oats RFC
Maria Samson	Lock	2 February 1983		(Alberta) Calgary Hornets
Barbara Mervin	Flanker	1 April 1982		(British Columbia) Velox Valhallians
Jacey Murphy	Flanker	21 March 1989		(Ontario) Aurora Barbarians RFC
Karen Paquin	Flanker	3 August 1987		CR Quebec
Kelly Russell	Number 8	7 December 1986		(Ontario) Toronto Nomads
Stephanie Bernier	Scrum-half	28 June 1988		CR Quebec
Julia Sugawara	Scrum-half	27 November 1982		(British Columbia) Burnaby Lake Rugby Club
Emily Belchos	Fly-half	27 April 1995		(Ontario) Markham Irish RFC
Julianne Zussman	Fly-half	23 January 1987		(Quebec) Town of Mount Royal RFC
Andrea Burk	Centre	7 April 1982		(British Columbia) Capilano RFC
Mandy Marchak	Centre	24 November 1984		(British Columbia) Capilano RFC
Amanda Thornborough	Centre	2 July 1990		(Manitoba) Brandon Barbarians RFC
Brittany Benn	Wing	23 April 1989		(Ontario) Guelph Redcoats RFC
Jessica Dovanne	Wing	3 February 1986		(British Columbia) Velox Valhallians
Magali Harvey	Wing	16 August 1990		CR Quebec
Brittany Waters	Wing	23 April 1983		(British Columbia) Meraloma Rugby
Elissa Alarie	Fullback	31 January 1986		(Quebec) Sainte-Anne-de-Bellevue RC

=== England ===
Head Coach: (England) Gary Street

Note: Flags indicate national union for the club/province as defined by World Rugby.

Player	Position	Date of birth (age)	Caps	Club/province
Emma Croker (nee Layland)	Hooker	29 September 1982 (31)	50	(England) Richmond
Victoria Fleetwood	Hooker	25 April 1990 (24)	39	(England) Lichfield
Rochelle Clark	Prop	29 May 1981 (33)	91	(England) Worcester
Sophie Hemming	Prop	20 June 1980 (34)	67	(England) Bristol
Laura Keates	Prop	5 August 1988 (25)	36	(England) Worcester
Claire Purdy	Prop	1 April 1980 (34)	41	(England) Wasps
Becky Essex	Lock	16 November 1982 (31)	52	(England) Richmond
Joanna McGilchrist	Lock	27 August 1983 (30)	58	(England) Wasps
Tamara Taylor	Lock	8 October 1981 (32)	73	(England) Sharks
Maggie Alphonsi	Flanker	20 December 1983 (30)	70	(England) Saracens
Heather Fisher	Flanker	13 June 1984 (30)	22	(England) Worcester
Alexandra Matthews	Flanker	3 August 1993 (20)	9	(England) Richmond
Marlie Packer	Flanker	28 April 1989 (24)	28	(England) Wasps
Sarah Hunter	Number 8	19 September 1985 (28)	63	(England) Lichfield
Natasha Hunt	Scrum-half	8 October 1989 (25)	24	(England) Lichfield
La Toya Mason	Scrum-half	21 July 1984 (30)	42	(England) Wasps
Ceri Large	Fly-half	30 August 1990 (23)	27	(England) Worcester
Katy McLean	Fly-half	19 December 1985 (28)	69	(England) Sharks
Rachael Burford	Centre	19 August 1986 (27)	51	(England) Thurrock
Amber Reed	Centre	21 May 1991 (23)	17	(England) Bristol
Emily Scarratt	Centre	8 February 1990 (24)	50	(England) Lichfield
Katherine Merchant	Wing	29 October 1985 (28)	54	(England) Worcester
Lydia Thompson	Wing	10 February 1992 (22)	13	(England) Worcester
Kay Wilson	Wing	17 July 1991 (23)	26	(England) Bristol
Claire Allan	Fullback	7 May 1985 (29)	27	(England) Richmond
Danielle Waterman	Fullback	20 January 1985 (29)	55	(England) Bristol

=== Samoa ===
Head Coach: (Samoa) Euini Lale Faumuina

Note: Flags indicate national union for the club/province as defined by World Rugby.

Player	Position	Date of birth (age)	Caps	Club/province
Sharlene Fagalilo	Hooker	26 July 1985		(New Zealand) Old Boys University
Laura Levi	Hooker	25 October 1983		(New Zealand) Ardmore Marist RC
Sally Kaokao	Prop	12 May 1979		(New Zealand) Manurewa RFC
Ala Leavasa-Bakulich	Prop	9 October 1979		(New Zealand) Marist
Ginia Muavae	Prop	31 August 1990		(New Zealand) Waikato University
Contessah Wright	Prop	23 November 1993		(New Zealand) Ponsonby RFC
Vicki Logopati Campbell	Flanker	22 September 1981		(New Zealand) University of Canterbury RFC
Juliana Sua	Lock	27 December 1994		(New Zealand) Manurewa RFC
Cynthia Ta'ala	Lock	29 August 1974		(New Zealand) Ardmore Marist RC
Cynthia Apineru	Flanker	11 September 1983		(New Zealand) Ardmore Marist RC
Helen Collins	Flanker	5 June 1984		(New Zealand) Northern United RFC
Apaula Kerisiano	Flanker	14 August 1987		(Samoa) Vaiala Ulalei RC
Rita Lili'i	Flanker	4 December 1984		(New Zealand) Ardmore Marist RC
Italia Tipelu	Flanker	3 December 1986		(New Zealand) Ponsonby RFC
Roxy Leaupepe	Scrum-half	16 September 1983		(New Zealand) Manurewa RFC
Tulua Leuluaiali'i	Scrum-half	4 September 1981		(New Zealand) Marist
Bella Milo	Fly-half	29 May 1986		(New Zealand) Auckland Marist
Brenda Collins	Centre	29 October 1982		(New Zealand) Northern United RFC
Mac Collins	Centre	12 September 1991		(New Zealand) Northern United RFC
Merenaite Faitala-Mariner	Centre	22 August 1987		(New Zealand) Ardmore Marist RC
Justine Luatua	Wing	17 May 1989		(New Zealand) Ardmore Marist RC
Taliilagi Mefi	Wing	15 August 1989		(Samoa) Leulumoega Fou College
Bernadette Robertson	Wing	4 June 1993		(New Zealand) Ardmore Marist RC
Tile Start	Wing	3 February 1988		(New Zealand) East Tamaki RFC
Mele Leuluaiali'i	Fullback	31 October 1982		(New Zealand) Ardmore Marist RC
Soteria Pulumu	Fullback	16 November 1991		(Samoa) Vaiala Ulalei RC

=== Spain ===
Head Coach: (Spain) Inés Etxegibel

Note: Flags indicate national union for the club/province as defined by World Rugby.

Player	Position	Date of birth (age)	Caps	Club/province
Aroa González	Hooker	19 April 1979	57	(Catalonia) INEF Barcelona
Elsa Porto	Hooker	24 February 1988	1	(Galicia (Spain)) CRAT A Coruña
Rocío García	Prop	31 January 1981	54	(Galicia (Spain)) CRAT A Coruña
Elena Redondo	Prop	28 June 1988	6	(Community of Madrid) Olímpico Pozuelo
Isabel Rico	Prop	28 November 1987	8	(Community of Madrid) Olímpico Pozuelo
María del Carmen Sequedo	Prop	11 June 1980	30	(Catalonia) INEF Barcelona
Lourdes Alameda	Lock	29 July 1991	2	(Community of Madrid) XV Sanse Scrum
Tania Ortega	Lock	18 October 1987	1	(Catalonia) INEF Barcelona
María Ribera	Lock	8 July 1986	13	(Community of Madrid) XV Sanse Scrum
María Casado	Flanker	25 December 1985	3	(Community of Madrid) CR Majadahonda
Ángela del Pan	Flanker	19 April 1985	20	(Germany) Heilderberger RC
Diana Gassó	Flanker	16 July 1984	2	(Catalonia) Gòtics RC
Paula Medín	Flanker	17 June 1984	19	(Galicia (Spain)) CRAT A Coruña
Ana María Aigneren	Number 8	4 January 1978	29	(Community of Madrid) Olímpico Pozuelo
Anna Arnau	Scrum-half	8 July 1987	5	(Catalonia) GEiEG
Bárbara Plà	Scrum-half	17 July 1983	39	(Basque Country (autonomous community)) Getxo RT
Helena Roca	Fly-half	1 July 1976	40	(Galicia (Spain)) CRAT A Coruña
Ana Vanesa Rial	Fly-half	1 March 1982	16	(Galicia (Spain)) CRAT A Coruña
Marina Bravo	Centre	2 July 1989	20	(Community of Madrid) Complutense Cisneros
África Félez	Centre	11 January 1992	1	(Catalonia) GEiEG
Patricia García	Centre	2 December 1989	15	(New Zealand) Waikato RU
Iera Echebarria	Wing	20 October 1992	1	(Community of Madrid) Olímpico Pozuelo
Berta García	Wing	12 April 1982	29	(Galicia (Spain)) CRAT A Coruña
Elisabet Martínez	Wing	13 June 1988	11	(Catalonia) GEiEG
Marta Cabané	Fullback	15 August 1985	4	(Catalonia) GEiEG
Irene Schiavon	Fullback	1 March 1987	7	(Community of Madrid) Olímpico Pozuelo

== Pool B ==
=== Ireland ===
Head Coach: (Ireland) Philip Doyle

Note: Flags indicate national union for the club/province as defined by World Rugby.

Player	Position	Date of birth (age)	Caps	Club/province
Gillian Bourke	Hooker	28 August 1984		(Munster) UL Bohemians
Sharon Lynch	Hooker	17 September 1982		(Leinster) Old Belvedere
Fiona Coghlan	Prop	3 March 1981		(Leinster) UL Bohemians
Kerrie-Ann Craddock	Prop	30 August 1984		(England) Saracens
Laura Guest	Prop	24 April 1985		(Munster) Highfield
Ailis Egan	Prop	4 February 1984		(Leinster) Old Belvedere
Orla Fitzsimons	Lock	22 August 1981		(Leinster) St. Mary's College
Heather O'Brien	Lock	22 July 1984		(Munster) Highfield
Marie Louise Reilly	Lock	1 April 1980		(Leinster) Old Belvedere
Sophie Spence	Lock	26 February 1987		(Leinster) Old Belvedere
Siobhan Fleming	Flanker	2 October 1981		(Munster) Tralee
Fiona Hayes	Flanker	13 September 1982		(Munster) UL Bohemians
Claire Molloy	Flanker	22 June 1988		(England) Bristol
Paula Fitzpatrick	Number 8	12 August 1985		(Leinster) St. Mary's College
Larissa Muldoon	Scrum-half	11 March 1991		(England) Bristol
Tania Rosser	Scrum-half	15 April 1978		(Leinster) Blackrock
Nora Stapleton	Fly-half	5 July 1983		(Leinster) Old Belvedere
Lynne Cantwell	Centre	27 September 1981		(England) Richmond
Grace Davitt	Centre	25 December 1982		(Ulster) Cooke
Jenny Murphy	Centre	30 May 1989		(Leinster) Old Belvedere
Hannah Casey	Wing	20 September 1988		(England) Saracens
Niamh Kavanagh	Wing	30 July 1987		(Munster) UL Bohemians
Alison Miller	Wing	30 October 1984		(Connacht) Portlaoise
Ashleigh Baxter	Fullback	21 December 1991		(Ulster) Belfast Harlequins
Niamh Briggs	Fullback	30 September 1984		(Munster) UL Bohemians
Jackie Shiels	Fullback	1 June 1985		(England) Richmond

=== Kazakhstan ===
Head Coach: (New Zealand) Adam McDonald

Note: Flags indicate national union for the club/province as defined by World Rugby.

Player	Position	Date of birth (age)	Caps	Club/province
Nigora Nurmatova	Hooker	23 January 1990 (24)		(Kazakhstan) Almaty SRC
Irina Radzivil	Hooker	27 October 1979 (34)		(Kazakhstan) Olymp SRC
Yelena Yevdokimova	Hooker	18 November 1989 (24)		(Kazakhstan) Almaty SRC
Olga Bakhtiguzina	Prop	22 March 1990 (24)		(Kazakhstan) Almaty SRC
Natalya Kamendrovskaya	Prop	17 April 1990 (24)		(Kazakhstan) Almaty SRC
Yelena Muradova	Prop	31 January 1989 (25)		(Kazakhstan) Almaty SRC
Yelena Rogacheva	Prop	7 November 1983 (30)		(Kazakhstan) Taraz
Olga Sazonova	Prop	24 January 1986 (28)		(Kazakhstan) Almaty SRC
Veronika Stepanyuga	Prop	12 November 1994 (19)		(Kazakhstan) Almaty SRC
Svetlana Karatygina	Lock	11 May 1974 (40)		(Kazakhstan) Almaty SRC
Yelena Kiryushina	Lock	2 January 1985 (29)		(Kazakhstan) Almaty SRC
Marianna Balashova	Flanker	1 December 1984 (29)		(Kazakhstan) Almaty SRC
Anastassiya Khamova	Flanker	19 April 1980 (34)		(Kazakhstan) Almaty SRC
Symbat Zhamankulova	Flanker	16 June 1991 (23)		(Kazakhstan) Olymp SRC
Amina Baratova	Scrum-half	10 September 1982 (31)		(Kazakhstan) Almaty SRC
Karina Proskurina	Scrum-half	25 September 1990 (23)		(Kazakhstan) Olymp SRC
Svetlana Klyuchnikova	Fly-half	27 June 1984 (30)		(Kazakhstan) Almaty SRC
Balzhan Koishybayeva	Centre	22 January 1994 (20)		(Kazakhstan) Almaty SRC
Lyudmila Matiyeva	Centre	14 November 1993 (20)		(Kazakhstan) Almaty SRC
Oxana Shardina	Centre	23 March 1991 (23)		(Kazakhstan) Olymp SRC
Anna Yakovleva	Centre	10 November 1983 (30)		(Kazakhstan) Almaty SRC
Kundyzay Baktybayeva	Wing	27 March 1989 (25)		(Kazakhstan) Almaty SRC
Lilya Bazyaruk	Wing	14 February 1989 (25)		(Kazakhstan) Almaty SRC
Lyudmila Sapronova	Wing	17 October 1992 (21)		(Kazakhstan) Olymp SRC
Aigerym Daurembayeva	Fullback	4 August 1980 (33)		(Kazakhstan) Almaty SRC
Aigul Dairbayeva	Fullback	10 February 1993 (21)		(Kazakhstan) Olymp SRC

=== New Zealand ===
Head Coach: (New Zealand) Brian Evans

Note: Flags indicate national union for the club/province as defined by World Rugby.

Player	Position	Date of birth (age)	Caps	Club/province
Fiao'o Fa'amausili	Hooker	30 September 1980		(New Zealand) Auckland
Te Kura Ngata-Aerengamate	Hooker	21 October 1991		(New Zealand) Counties Manukau
Ruth McKay	Prop	2 August 1986		(New Zealand) Manawatu
Aleisha Nelson	Prop	2 March 1990		(New Zealand) Auckland
Stephanie Te Ohaere-Fox	Prop	6 April 1985		(New Zealand) Canterbury
Kathleen Wilton	Prop	10 November 1984		(New Zealand) Otago
Eloise Blackwell	Lock	28 December 1990		(New Zealand) Auckland
Sanita Levave	Lock	8 November 1988		(New Zealand) Wellington
Jackie Patea	Lock	30 September 1986		(New Zealand) Wellington
Rawinia Everitt	Flanker	4 September 1986		(New Zealand) Counties Manukau
Linda Itunu	Flanker	21 November 1984		(New Zealand) Auckland
Justine Lavea	Flanker	10 July 1984		(New Zealand) Auckland
Aroha Savage	Flanker	11 March 1990		(New Zealand) Auckland
Casey Robertson	Number 8	24 February 1981		(New Zealand) Canterbury
Kendra Cocksedge	Scrum-half	1 July 1988		(New Zealand) Canterbury
Emma Jensen	Scrum-half	25 November 1977		(New Zealand) Auckland
Kelly Brazier	Fly-half	28 October 1989		(New Zealand) Otago
Victoria Subritzky-Nafatali	Fly-half	2 December 1991		(New Zealand) Otago
Huriana Manuel	Centre	8 August 1986		(New Zealand) Auckland
Amiria Rule	Centre	17 May 1983		(New Zealand) Canterbury
Halie Tiplady-Hurring	Centre	27 February 1986		(New Zealand) Otago
Shakira Baker	Wing	4 January 1992		(New Zealand) Manawatu
Honey Hireme	Wing	8 May 1981		(New Zealand) Waikato
Renee Wickliffe	Wing	30 May 1987		(New Zealand) Auckland
Selica Winiata	Wing	14 November 1986		(New Zealand) Manawatu
Claire Corky	Fullback	2 April 1984		(New Zealand) Otago

=== United States ===
Head Coach: (United States) Peter Steinberg

Note: Flags indicate national union for the club/province as defined by World Rugby.

Player	Position	Date of birth (age)	Caps	Club/province
Kathryn Augustyn	Hooker	29 June 1984	11	(California) Berkeley All Blues WRC
Kittery Wagner	Hooker	15 September 1979	31	(Colorado) Glendale Raptors RFC
Jamie Burke	Prop	14 October 1980	42	(Colorado) Glendale Raptors RFC
Sarah Chobot	Prop	19 December 1980	4	(Colorado) Glendale Raptors RFC
Naima Reddick	Prop	26 May 1984	11	(California) San Francisco Golden Gate RFC
Hope Rogers	Prop	7 January 1993	6	(Pennsylvania) Penn State WRFC
Sarah Wilson	Prop	4 October 1984	8	(Colorado) Glendale Raptors RFC
Lauren Daly	Lock	22 September 1986	3	(California) San Diego Surfers WRC
Carmen Farmer	Lock	4 December 1980		(Maryland) Severn River RFC
Sarah Walsh	Lock	23 March 1981	5	(California) Berkeley All Blues WRC
Lynelle Kugler	Flanker	13 November 1981	25	(Minnesota) Amazons WRC
Jillion Potter	Flanker	5 July 1986	11	(Colorado) Glendale Raptors RFC
Shaina Turley	Flanker	11 August 1984	15	(California) San Diego Surfers WRC
Sharon Blaney	Number 8	16 May 1979	19	Oregon Sports Union RC
Kate Daley	Number 8	27 September 1985	8	(Illinois) North Shore Chicago WRC
Deven Owsiany	Scrum-half	3 June 1989	1	(Pennsylvania)
Jocelyn Tseng	Scrum-half	14 March 1986	1	(California) Berkeley All Blues WRC
Sadie Anderson	Fly-half	25 May 1990	13	(Colorado) Unattached
Kimberly Rozier	Fly-half	20 July 1989		(Colorado) Glendale Raptors RFC
Meya Bizer	Centre	10 May 1993	10	(Pennsylvania) Penn State WRFC
Sylvia Braaten	Centre	5 July 1985	3	(Minnesota) Amazons WRC
Emilie Bydwell	Centre	31 August 1985	12	(California) San Diego Surfers WRC
Nathalie Marchino	Wing	27 July 1981	15	(California) Berkeley All Blues WRC
Vanesha McGee	Wing	20 July 1984	15	(New York (state)) New York RC
Akalaini Baravilala	Fullback	12 July 1991	3	(Hawaii) Aliamanu All Blues
Hannah Stolba	Fullback	2 June 1982	6	(Colorado) Glendale Raptors RFC

== Pool C ==
=== Australia ===
Head Coach: (Australia) Paul Verrell

Note: Flags indicate national union for the club/province as defined by World Rugby.

Player	Position	Date of birth (age)	Caps	Club/province
Louise Burrows	Hooker	11 March 1978		(Australian Capital Territory) Royals RU
Margaret Watson	Hooker	18 December 1986		(New South Wales) University of Newcastle
Danielle Meskell	Prop	13 November 1973		(New South Wales) Warringah Rats
Shannon Parry	Prop	27 October 1989		(Queensland) Redlands RUC
Oneata Schwalger	Prop	4 July 1985		(Victoria (state)) Melbourne Unicorns
Caroline Vakalahi	Prop	4 January 1983		(Australia) Australian Services RU
Sharni Williams	Prop	2 March 1988		(Australian Capital Territory)
Rebecca Clough	Lock	14 November 1988		(Western Australia) Cottesloe RUC
Alisha Hewett	Lock	26 December 1985		(Australia) Australian Services RU
Brooke Saunders	Lock	23 April 1985		(Australia) Australian Services RU
Chloe Butler	Flanker	11 April 1987		(New South Wales) Parramatta Two Blues
Dalena Dennison	Flanker	26 December 1985		(Queensland) Sunnybank Dragons
Mollie Gray	Flanker	29 September 1989		(Australia) Australian Services RU
Michelle Milward	Flanker	10 January 1986		(New South Wales) Queanbeyan Whites
Liz Patu	Flanker	15 July 1989		(Victoria (state)) Western Bulldogs
Rebecca Smyth	Flanker	8 February 1985		(New South Wales) Dubbo Rhinos
Nita Maynard	Scrum-half	7 July 1992		(New South Wales) Parramatta Two Blues
Tui Ormsby	Scrum-half	20 January 1978		(New South Wales) Warringah Rats
Cheyenne Campbell	Centre	10 September 1986		(Queensland) Redlands RUC
Ashley Marsters	Centre	2 November 1993		(Victoria (state)) Melbourne Unicorns
Cobie-Jane Morgan	Centre	29 June 1989		(New South Wales) Warringah Rats
Natasha Haines	Wing	23 December 1981		(Western Australia) Cottesloe RUC
Madeline Putz	Wing	18 September 1989		(Western Australia) Kalamunda RUC
Tricia Brown	Fullback	14 March 1979		University of Queensland
Ashleigh Hewson	Fullback	18 December 1979		(New South Wales) Sydney University

=== France ===
Head Coach: (France) Christian Galonnier

Note: Flags indicate national union for the club/province as defined by World Rugby.

Player	Position	Date of birth (age)	Caps	Club/province
Gaëlle Mignot	Hooker	26 February 1987	38	(Languedoc-Roussillon) Montpellier Hérault Rugby
Laëtitia Salles	Hooker	29 October 1982	86	(Provence-Alpes-Côte d'Azur) RC La Valette
Lise Arricastre	Prop	17 June 1991	18	(Aquitaine) RC Lons
Christelle Chobet	Prop	22 April 1986	30	(Aquitaine) RC Lons
Hélène Ezanno	Prop	28 August 1984	30	(Nord-Pas-de-Calais) Lille Métropole RC Villeneuvois
Elodie Portaries	Prop	9 December 1989	25	(Languedoc-Roussillon) Montpellier Hérault Rugby
Marine De Nadaï	Lock	2 June 1988	22	(Languedoc-Roussillon) Montpellier Hérault Rugby
Laëtitia Grand	Lock	26 July 1990	15	(Aquitaine) RC Lons
Assa Koïta	Lock	28 June 1991	21	(Île-de-France) AC Bobigny 93
Manon André	Flanker	22 September 1986	36	(Midi-Pyrénées) Saint-Orens RC
Coumba Tombe Diallo	Flanker	27 September 1990	21	(Île-de-France) AC Bobigny 93
Koumiba Djossouvi	Flanker	2 November 1982	14	(Languedoc-Roussillon) Montpellier Hérault Rugby
Safi N'Diaye	Number 8	16 June 1988	23	(Languedoc-Roussillon) Montpellier Hérault Rugby
Sandra Rabier	Number 8	1 March 1985	61	(Lower Normandy) Ovalie Caennaise
Yanna Rivoalen	Scrum-half	10 June 1989	9	(Nord-Pas-de-Calais) Lille Métropole RC Villeneuvois
Jennifer Troncy	Scrum-half	26 January 1986	43	(Languedoc-Roussillon) Montpellier Hérault Rugby
Sandrine Agricole	Fly-half	13 March 1980	77	(Brittany) Stade Rennais
Christelle Le Duff	Fly-half	21 January 1982	63	(Languedoc-Roussillon) USA Perpignan
Shannon Izar	Centre	8 May 1993	6	(Nord-Pas-de-Calais) Lille Métropole RC Villeneuvois
Marjorie Mayans	Centre	17 November 1991	17	(Midi-Pyrénées) Saint-Orens RC
Elodie Poublan	Centre	13 April 1989	39	(Languedoc-Roussillon) Montpellier Hérault Rugby
Camille Grassineau	Wing	10 September 1990	8	(Aquitaine) Stade Bordelais
Elodie Guiglion	Wing	28 January 1990	10	(Languedoc-Roussillon) USA Perpignan
Marion Lievre	Wing	10 January 1991	7	(Île-de-France) AC Bobigny 93
Caroline Ladagnous	Fullback	22 September 1988	38	(Aquitaine) RC Lons
Jessy Tremouliere	Fullback	29 July 1992	28	Ovalie Romagnatoise Clermont Auvergne

=== South Africa ===
Head Coach: (South Africa) Lawrence Sephaka

Note: Flags indicate national union for the club/province as defined by World Rugby.

Player	Position	Date of birth (age)	Caps	Club/province
Thantaswa Macingwana	Hooker	13 January 1994		(South Africa) Border Bulldogs
Denita Wentzel	Hooker	31 March 1990		(South Africa) Western Province
Portia Jonga	Prop	4 November 1988		(South Africa) Eastern Province
Cebisa Kula	Prop	19 May 1981		(South Africa) Eastern Province
Nwabisa Faith Ngxatu	Prop	25 October 1983		(South Africa) Border Bulldogs
Asithandile Ntoyanto	Prop	6 May 1991		(South Africa) Border Bulldogs
Celeste Aneurin Adonis	Lock	7 June 1992		(South Africa) Western Province
Nolusindiso Booi	Lock	29 June 1985		(South Africa) Border Bulldogs
Nomathamsanqa Yolanda Faleni	Lock	3 March 1985		(South Africa) Eastern Province
Rachelle Geldenhuys	Flanker	20 January 1987		(South Africa) Blue Bulls
Lamla Momoti	Flanker	27 March 1985		(South Africa) Border Bulldogs
Vuyolwethu Vazi	Flanker	11 July 1987		(South Africa) Blue Bulls
Shona-Leah Weston	Number 8	25 November 1991		(South Africa) Blue Bulls
Mandisa Williams	Number 8	8 November 1984		(South Africa) Border Bulldogs
Tayla Kinsey	Scrum-half	5 September 1993		(South Africa) KwaZulu-Natal
Fundiswa Plaatjie	Scrum-half	4 December 1985		(South Africa) Border Bulldogs
Siphosethu Tshingana	Scrum-half	12 October 1987		(South Africa) Eastern Province
Zenay Jordaan	Fly-half	4 April 1991		(South Africa) Border Bulldogs
Lorinda Brown	Centre	16 December 1983		(South Africa) Eastern Province
Bella Benele Makwezela	Centre	16 January 1986		(South Africa) Western Province
Ziyanda Tywaleni	Centre	26 November 1987		(South Africa) Border Bulldogs
Phumeza Gadu	Wing	21 June 1985		(South Africa) Eastern Province
Veroeshka Jasmine Grain	Wing	11 December 1990		(South Africa) Western Province
Sinazo Nobele	Wing	5 October 1988		(South Africa) Blue Bulls
Siviwe Basweni	Fullback	17 October 1990		(South Africa) Border Bulldogs
Cindy Cant	Fullback	9 October 1982		(South Africa) Blue Bulls

=== Wales ===
Head Coach: (Wales) Rhys Edwards

Note: Flags indicate national union for the club/province as defined by World Rugby.

Player	Position	Date of birth (age)	Caps	Club/province
Lowri Harries	Hooker	15 February 1990		(Wales) Neath Athletic
Jennifer Davies	Prop	11 March 1982		(England) Waterloo
Catrin Edwards	Prop	15 September 1980		(England) Bristol
Cerys Rhiannon-Hale	Prop	4 April 1993		(Wales) Pontyclun
Caryl Thomas	Prop	19 February 1986		(England) Bath
Megan York	Prop	16 April 1987		(Wales) Blaenau Gwent
Jennifer Hawkins	Lock	3 April 1990		(Wales) Llandaff North
Shona Powell Hughes	Lock	8 July 1991		(Wales) Neath Athletic
Nia Davies	Flanker	7 December 1992		(Wales) Cardiff
Sioned Harries	Flanker	22 November 1989		(Wales) Llandaff North
Carys Phillips	Flanker	12 November 1982		(England) Bristol
Sian Williams	Flanker	26 October 1990		(England) Worcester
Catrina Nicholas	Number 8	1 December 1982		(Wales) Llandaff North
Rachel Taylor	Number 8	13 June 1983		(England) Bristol
Amy Day	Scrum-half	7 October 1985		(Wales) Llandaff North
Sian Moore	Scrum-half	1 March 1988		(England) Bristol
Elinor Snowsill	Fly-half	27 July 1989		(England) Bristol
Elen Evans	Centre	9 January 1985		(England) Waterloo
Rebecca De Filippo	Centre	25 February 1994		(England) Bristol
Adi Taviner	Centre	20 February 1990		(Wales) Neath Athletic
Robyn Wilkins	Centre	1 April 1995		(Wales) Llandaff North
Laurie Harries	Wing	24 October 1989		(Wales) Llandaff North
Elli Norkett	Wing	30 May 1996		(Wales) Neath Athletic
Rafique Taylor	Wing	23 June 1978		(Wales) Pontyclun
Philippa Tuttiett	Wing	8 December 1983		(England) Bristol
Dyddgu Hywel	Fullback	10 March 1989		(England) Bristol
