= Colette McAuley =

Canadian rugby union player

Collete Yvonne Margaret Mcauley
- Born: May 11, 1973 (age 53) Forest, Ontario
- University: University of Guelph (BSci, MSci); Wilfrid Laurier University (MBA)

Rugby union career
- Position: Fullback
Amateur team(s)
Years	Team	Apps	(Points)
2005	Highland		
- Guelph RFC
- Guelph Gryphons
Provincial / State sides
Years	Team	Apps	(Points)
1994-2007	Ontario		
International career
Years	Team	Apps	(Points)
1996-2007	Canada	21	
National sevens team
Years	Team		Comps
2 years	Canada		
Coaching career
- Years: Team
- 2007-present: Guelph Gryphons Head Coach
- 1996-2006: Guelph Gryphons Asst. Coach, Tech
- Canada Technical Support
Medal record
Representing Canada
Women's rugby union
World Cup
Silver medal – second place	2014 France	Team competition

Colette McAuley (born May 11, 1973) is a former Canadian rugby union player with 21 caps, including the 2002 Women's Rugby World Cup, during a ten-year career with Rugby Canada.

== Rugby career ==
At the University of Guelph, McAuley played fullback for the Guelph Gryphons. She was also a member of the Ontario provincial team from 1994 to 2007 and was team captain in 2005.

McAuley's first international cap was at a Can-Am test match in Saranac Lake, N.Y. on the 6th of August 2000 under Coach Ric Suggitt. She would spend ten years with the program including participation at the 2002 Women's Rugby World Cup. McAuley played in the 2011, 2003, and 2005 Canada Cups.

For two years, McAuley also represented Canada at international sevens tournaments in Hong Kong, Dubai, and Los Angeles; including winning tournaments in San Diego and Toronto

== Coaching and community ==
After retiring from her international career, McAuley spent a decade as an assistant coach for the Guelph Gryphons before becoming the head coach in 2006. Under her supervision as head coach, the program won eight OUA championships and a national title in 2011.

She runs an athlete-centered program which focuses on technique as much as the psyche of her players. Her ability to develop and spot talent earned her the title of Pathway Coach to National 15's and 7's programs for the past decade including representation as Maple Leafs 7s Assistant Coach at the invitational Las Vegas sevens tournament in 2017.

McAuley has also been a member on the Rugby Canada Board of Directors, Past-President of the Canadian Rugby Foundation, and the Monty Heald National Women's Fund committee member.

== Colette McAuley award ==
The Rugby Canada Foundation honoured McAuley's contribution to the sport by founding an award in her name in 2009. The recipient represents the true spirit of the game and gives back to sport of rugby. As of 2011, the award holder received a $1000 cheque from the Colette McAuley Fund.

Recipients:

- 2009, Marlene Donaldson
- 2010, Julie Foster
- 2011, Julia Sugawara
- 2012, Meaghan Howat
- 2013, Maria Samson

== Honours and awards ==
- 1994, Ontario National championship team
- 1995, Ontario National championship team
- 1996, Guelph RFC MVP
- 1997, Ontario National championship team
- 1997, Guelph RFC MVP
- 1998, Ontario National championship team
- 1999, Ontario National championship team
- 2000, Ontario National championship team
- 2003, Ontario National championship team
- 2005, Ontario National championship team
- 2008, Russell Division Coach of the Year
- 2008, U Sport Coach of the Year
- 2011, U Sport National championship team (coach)
- 2014, Women's Rugby World Cup silver medal (assistant coach)
- 2015, U Sport Coach of the Year
- 2017, U Sport Jim Atkinson Award as Coach of the Year
- 2017, OUA Shiels Division Coach of the Year
- 2018, OUA Coach of the Year
- 2018, OUA Female Coach of the Year
- 2018, Rugby Ontario Hall of Fame inductee
