= Sanita =

- Gender: Female
- Name day: September 14

Origin
- Region of origin: Latvia

Other names
- Related names: Zane, Zuzanna

Sanita is a Latvian feminine given name. Its name day is September 14.

Most likely derives from Sane, which itself is derived from Zuzanna - a cognate to Susanna. A popular claim is that Sanita originates from the Latin word sanitas ('health'), but this claim is disputed.

== Notable people named Sanita ==
- Sanita Buliņa, Latvian biathlete
- Sanita Levave (born 1988), New Zealand rugby union player
- Sanita Ozoliņa, Latvian rower
- Sanita Pavļuta-Deslandes (born 1972), Latvian civil servant and diplomat
- Sanita Pušpure (born 1981), Latvian-Irish professional rower
