= Stephanie Bernier =

Canadian rugby union player

- Born: June 28, 1988 (age 38) Quebec City, Quebec
- Height: 1.63 m (5 ft 4 in)
- Weight: 61 kg (134 lb)

Rugby union career
- Position: Scrumhalf
Amateur team(s)
Years	Team	Apps	(Points)
2005-2015	Club de Rugby de Quebec		
2004-2008	Laval Rouge et Or		
Provincial / State sides
Years	Team	Apps	(Points)
2012-2013	Quebec		
International career
Years	Team	Apps	(Points)
-2016	Canada	21	
Coaching career
- Years: Team
- 2016-: Rouge et Or
Medal record
Women's rugby union
Representing Canada
World Cup
Silver medal – second place	2014 France	Team competition

Stephanie Bernier (born June 28, 1988) is a Canadian rugby union player.

She represented Canada at the 2014 Women's Rugby World Cup and was named to the Dream Team. She retired from the national team in 2016 and now coaches Rouge et Or.

Bernier competed in gymnastics before discovering rugby in High School.
