= Andrea Burk =

Canada international dual-code rugby player

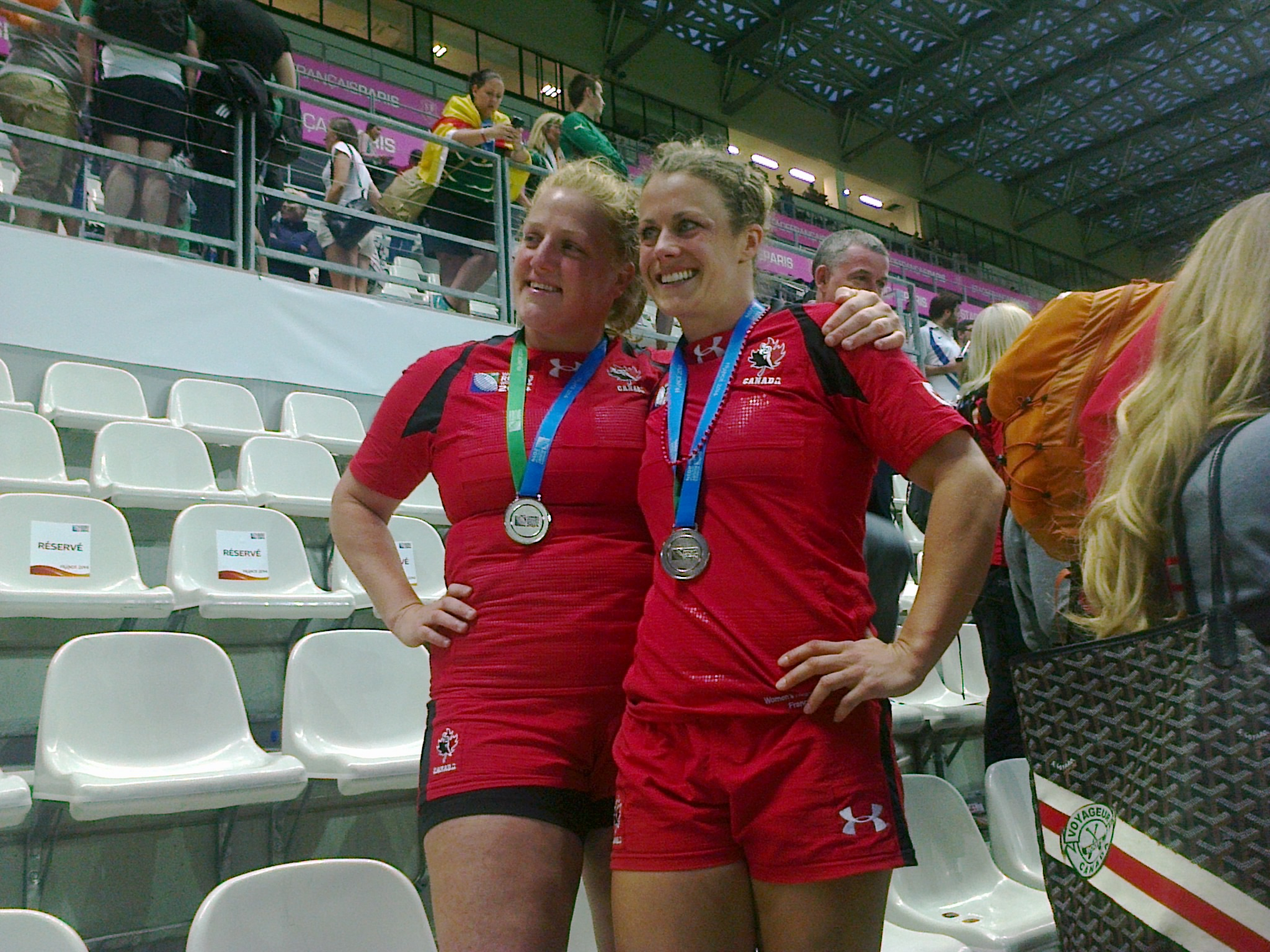
- Hilary Leith and Burk
- Born: April 7, 1982 (age 44)
- Height: 1.7 m (5 ft 7 in)
- Weight: 75 kg (165 lb)
- Occupation(s): Sports commentator and analyst

Rugby union career
- Position(s): Centre (15s), Forward (7s)
Amateur team(s)
Years	Team	Apps	(Points)
1997-	Capilano		
–	Acadia Axewomen		
International career
Years	Team	Apps	(Points)
2009–	Canada		
National sevens team
Years	Team		Comps
- Canada 7s
- Rugby league career

Playing information
Representative
Years	Team	Pld	T	G	FG	P
2017	Canada
Medal record
Women's rugby union
Representing Canada
World Cup
Silver medal – second place	2014 France	Team competition

Andrea Burk (born April 7, 1982) is a Canadian rugby footballer. She represented Canada in rugby union at the 2014 Women's Rugby World Cup and in rugby league at the 2017 Women's Rugby League World Cup. She made her debut in their 2009 tour of France.

== Rugby ==
Burk started playing rugby in 1997, at the age of 15, with her local club Capilano RFC.

Since 2013, she has been on the Aptoella Angels Select Team.

== Honors ==
- 2004-2006 Canadian Interuniversity Sport All-Canadian
- 2004-2006 Female Athlete of the Year - Acadia University
- 2010 National Campion - Team BC
- 2011 British Columbia - Female Player of the Year
- 2014 Gillian Florence award
- 2014 Women's Rugby World Cup Dream team
- 2016 Player of the Year finalist

== Personal ==
Burk has a Bachelor's degree in Kinesiology from Acadia University and a Master's degree in Leadership and Development from Royal Roads University.

From 2014-2016, Burke was the Director of the British Columbia Rugby Union Board of Directors and was on the National Women's Program Player's Committee from 2011 to 2014. She is also on the Monty Heald Fund committee.
