= Karen Paquin =

Canada international rugby union player

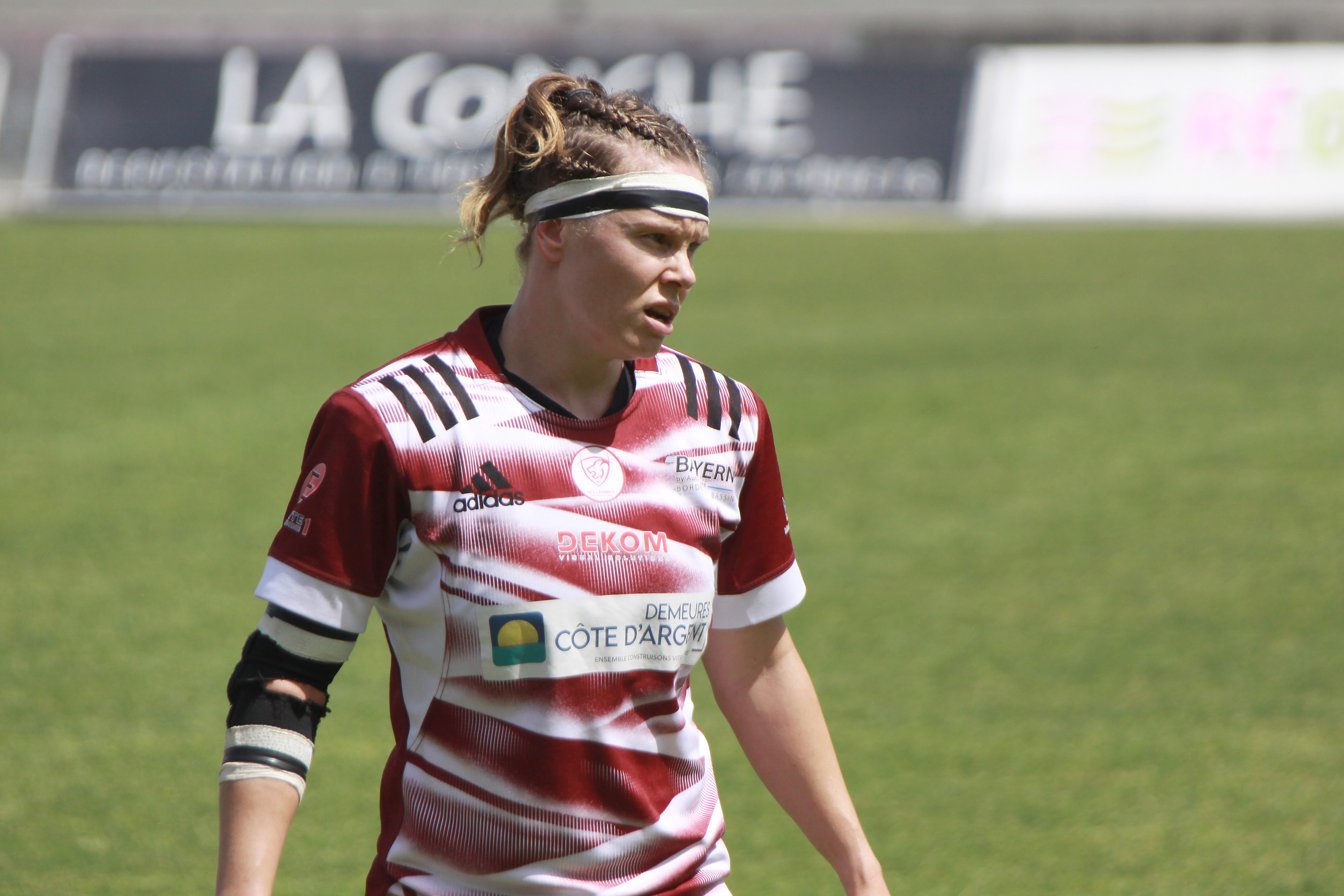
- Karen Paquin, third center line of the Stade Bordelais Lionesses team in 2022.
- Born: 3 August 1987 (age 39) Quebec City, Quebec
- Height: 1.73 m (5 ft 8 in)
- Weight: 68 kg (150 lb)
- University: Université Laval

Rugby union career
- Position: Loose forward
Amateur team(s)
Years	Team	Apps	(Points)
–	Club de Rugby de Québec		
–	Laval Rouge et Or		
Provincial / State sides
Years	Team	Apps	(Points)
–	Quebec		
International career
Years	Team	Apps	(Points)
2013–	Canada	51	(65)
- Correct as of 2025-09-27
National sevens team
Years	Team		Comps
2012-2016, 2019-	Canada		
Medal record
Representing Canada
Women's rugby union
World Cup
Silver medal – second place	2014 France	Team competition
Silver medal – second place	2025 England	Team competition
Women's rugby sevens
Olympic Games
Bronze medal – third place	2016 Rio de Janeiro	Team competition
Pan American Games
Gold medal – first place	2015 Toronto	Team competition
World Cup 7s
Silver medal – second place	2013 Russia	Team competition

Karen Paquin (born 3 August 1987) is a Canadian rugby union player. Known for her power and speed, she is skilled at both the sevens and 15s version of the game. She has competed in four Rugby World Cups – 2014, 2017, 2021 and 2025.

== Rugby career ==
=== Sevens ===
Paquin was a member of Canada's women's sevens team that were runners-up at the 2013 Rugby World Cup Sevens in Russia.

She won a gold medal at the 2015 Pan American Games as a member of the Canadian women's rugby sevens team.

In 2016, Paquin was named to Canada's first ever women's rugby sevens Olympic team. She won a bronze medal at the event.

She returned to the Canadian sevens side at the 2019 Kitakysushu Sevens where they earned a gold medal. In June 2021, Paquin was named to Canada's 2020 Summer Olympics team.

=== XVs ===
Paquin represented Canada at the 2014 Women's Rugby World Cup in France. Her side finished as runners-up after losing to England in the final.

In 2017, she suffered a knee injury during the Women's Rugby World Cup in Ireland, she underwent surgeries and rehabilition for three years before returning to the pitch.

She made Canada's squad for the delayed 2021 Rugby World Cup in New Zealand.

She was selected in Canada's squad for the 2025 Pacific Four Series. In July, she was named in the Canadian side to the Rugby World Cup in England.

== Personal life ==
She studied chemical engineering at Université Laval.

Paquin plays her rugby in Canada with Québec Est and Club de Rugby de Québec(CRQ) and occasionally with local women's teams on Vancouver Island, BC.
