= La Toya Mason =

England international rugby union player

- Born: 21 July 1984 (age 42) Auckland, New Zealand
- Height: 1.63 m (5 ft 4 in)
- Weight: 63 kg (139 lb)

Rugby union career
- Position: Scrumhalf
Senior career
Years	Team	Apps	(Points)
2015–present	Darlington Sharks		
2013	Wasps Ladies		
International career
Years	Team	Apps	(Points)
2009–2017	England	70	(23)
Coaching career
- Years: Team
- 2021–present: Blues Women (assistant)
Medal record
Representing England
Women's rugby union
Rugby World Cup
Gold medal – first place	2014 France	Team competition
Silver medal – second place	2017 Ireland	Team competition
Silver medal – second place	2010 England	Team competition

La Toya Mason (born 21 July 1984) is an English rugby union player and coach. She represented England at the 2010 Women's Rugby World Cup and was also named in the squad to the 2014 Women's Rugby World Cup. Born and raised in Auckland, New Zealand, Mason qualified for England through her four grandparents who are all English born.

Mason was selected for the 2017 Women's Rugby World Cup squad.
