= Maria Samson =

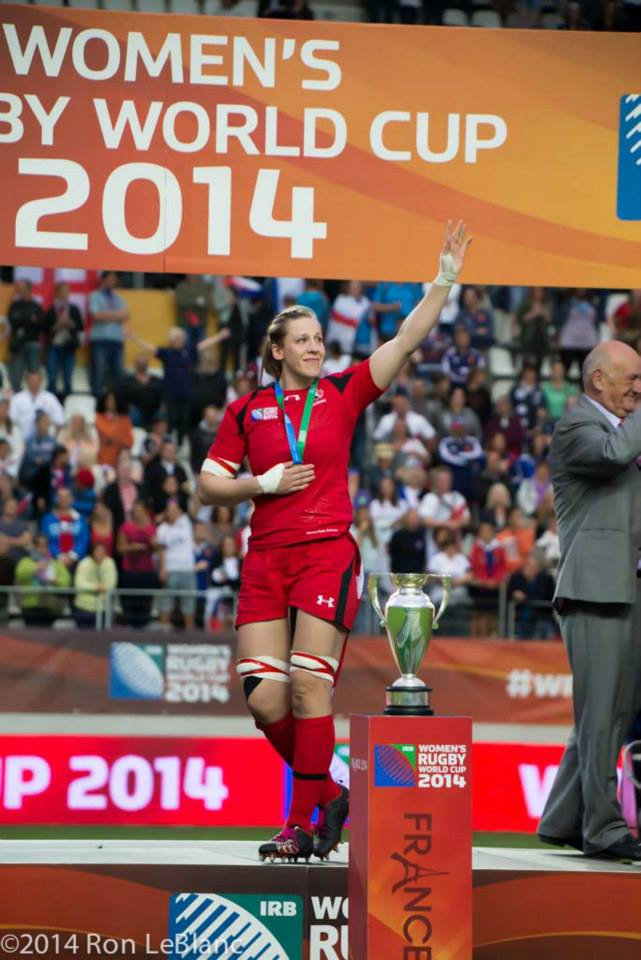
- Maria Samson received her Silver Medal at 2014 Women's Rugby World Cup
- Born: Maria Jaworski; February 2, 1983 (age 43) Montreal, Quebec, Canada
- Height: 1.83 m (6 ft 0 in)
- Weight: 84 kg (185 lb)
- University: McGill University; Queen's University

Rugby union career
- Position: Lock
Amateur team(s)
Years	Team	Apps	(Points)
2005-2008	McGill Marlets		
2011-2016	Calgary Hornets		
2008, 2017-2018	Calgary Saints		
International career
Years	Team	Apps	(Points)
2011-2016	Canada	21	
Medal record
Women's rugby union
Representing Canada
World Cup
Silver medal – second place	2014 France	Team competition

Maria Samson (born February 2, 1983) is a Canadian rugby union player.

== International play ==
Samson represented Canada at the 2014 Women's Rugby World Cup. She made her debut at the 2011 Nations Cup against South Africa with a 52–17 victory. In 2012, she was named as the Top Female Rugby Player in Canada. In 2013, Samson was the recipient of the Colette McAuley award.

== Personal ==
In 2015, she was honoured as one of Avenue Magazine's Top 40 Under 40 for her work in sport advocacy and community leadership.

In 2016, she appeared on Season 3 of CBC's "Canada's Smartest Person". She won her episode (Episode 3) and finished 3rd in the Finale.

Samson attended McGill University, where she attained a Bachelor of Engineering degree in mining with a Minor in management. Samson also has her Masters of Business Administration from Queen's University, funded through the Canadian Olympic Committee via a Game Plan Scholarship.
