= Jessica Dovanne =

Canadian rugby union player

- Born: February 3, 1986 (age 40) Victoria, British Columbia
- Height: 1.70 m (5 ft 7 in)
- Weight: 70 kg (154 lb)
- School: Thomas Haney Secondary
- University: University of Victoria
- Occupation: Luluemon Athletica product manager

Rugby union career
- Position: Wing
Amateur team(s)
Years	Team	Apps	(Points)
–	Burnaby Lake RFC		
–	Velox Valhallians		
–	Victoria Vikes		
International career
Years	Team	Apps	(Points)
2013-2014?	Canada		
National sevens team
Years	Team		Comps
2008-2013	Canada		
Coaching career
- Years: Team
- –: Castway Wanderers
Medal record
Women's rugby union
Representing Canada
World Cup
Silver medal – second place	2014 France	Team competition

Jessica Dovanne (born February 3, 1986) is a Canadian rugby union player. She represented Canada at the 2014 Women's Rugby World Cup. In 2013, she was part of the Canadian squad that won the 2013 Nations Cup and the sevens team that took the 2013 Hong Kong Sevens title.

She started playing in highlight (after representing the province as a trampoline and tumbling competitor) and played for the University of Victoria. She then became one of the original centralized national sevens athletes in 2008.
