= Julia Sugawara =

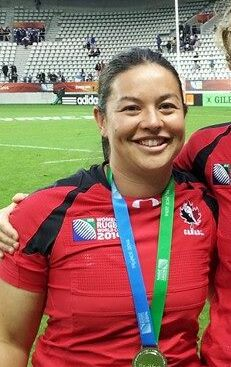
- 2014 Women's Rugby World Cup
- Born: November 27, 1982 (age 43)
- Height: 1.63 m (5 ft 4 in)
- Weight: 77 kg (170 lb)
- University: Trinity Western University
- Occupation: Elementary teacher

Rugby union career
- Position: Scrumhalf
Amateur team(s)
Years	Team	Apps	(Points)
–	Burnaby Lake		
2009-2010	Saracens		
International career
Years	Team	Apps	(Points)
2004-2014?	Canada		
Coaching career
- Years: Team
- –: Burnaby Lake
- –: VRU senior women
- –: BC U-17 girls
Medal record
Women's rugby union
Representing Canada
World Cup
Silver medal – second place	2014 France	Team competition

Julia Sugawara (born November 27, 1982) is a Canadian rugby union player. She has represented Canada at three World Cups in 2006, 2010, and 2014.

Sugawara plays for Burnaby Lake and represents the province of BC. She spent a year with the Saracens in 2009-2010. Returning to British Columbia, she coaches a BC Highschool team in Surrey/White Rock and also referees high school and division 2 women's games.

In 2011, she was awarded the Colette McAuley Award for her consistent efforts giving back to the game of rugby.

Sugawara studied at Trinity Western University and has a Bachelor's and Master's degree in Linguistics. She is a teacher's aide for special needs children.
