= Tamara Taylor (rugby union) =

England international rugby union player

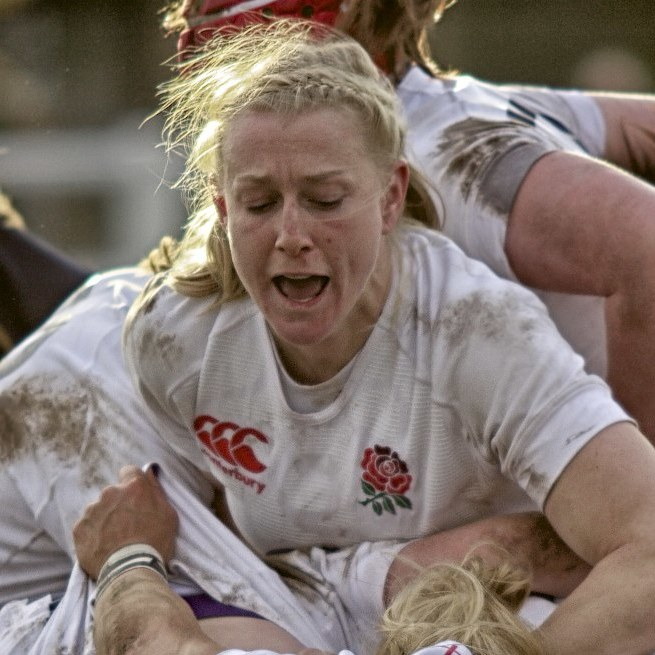
- Tamara Taylor mid maul (2013)
- Born: 8 October 1981 (age 45) Exeter, England
- Height: 1.8 m (5 ft 11 in)
- Weight: 83 kg (183 lb; 13 st 1 lb)

Rugby union career
- Position: Lock
Senior career
Years	Team	Apps	(Points)
–2020	Darlington Mowden Park Sharks	-	(-)
2020–2023	Saracens	-	(-)
International career
Years	Team	Apps	(Points)
2005–2017	England	115	(20)
Coaching career
- Years: Team
- 2013–2015: Jarrovians RUFC,
Medal record
Representing England
Women's rugby union
Rugby World Cup
Gold medal – first place	2014 France	Team competition
Silver medal – second place	2017 Ireland	Team competition
Silver medal – second place	2010 England	Team competition
Silver medal – second place	2006 Canada	Team competition

Tamara Louise Taylor (born 8 October 1981) is an English female rugby union player, who captained England in the 2015 Women's Six Nations Championship. She was the 2017 RPA Player of the Year when she was one of only three women who had made more than 100 appearances for her country. She is currently the fourth most capped England women's rugby union player of all time.

== Career ==
She was educated at The Oratory Preparatory School, Queen Anne's School, Caversham and Newcastle University where she read Biomedical Sciences. Taylor represented England at the 2006, 2010, 2014, and 2017 World Cups, winning in 2014. Taylor joined the Jarrovians RUFC as a coach in October 2013. and currently is player coach at Darlington Mowden Park Sharks.

She was the 2017 RPA Player of the Year when she was one of only three women who had made more than 100 appearances for her country. She was again the lock in the team for the 2017 Women's Rugby World Cup.
