= Mandy Marchak =

Canadian rugby union player (born 1984)

- Born: November 24, 1984 (age 41) Winnipeg, Manitoba
- Height: 1.70 m (5 ft 7 in)
- Weight: 77 kg (170 lb)

Rugby union career
- Position: Centre
Amateur team(s)
Years	Team	Apps	(Points)
–	Saracens		
–	Capilano RFC		
International career
Years	Team	Apps	(Points)
2005-2016	Canada		
National sevens team
Years	Team		Comps
2009-2016	Canada 7s		
- Rugby league career

Playing information
Representative
Years	Team	Pld	T	G	FG	P
2017	Canada
Medal record
Women's rugby union
Representing Canada
World Cup
Silver medal – second place	2014 France	Team competition

Mandy Marchak (born November 24, 1984) is a Canadian rugby footballer. She represented Canada at three rugby union World Cups in 2006, 2010 and 2014 and at rugby league in 2017 World Cup. She also played in two Sevens World Cups in 2009 and 2013.

She also spent two years in the United Kingdom with the Saracens side.

Marchak retired from rugby union in 2016 due to injury. She then took up rugby league and was selected to represent the Canada Ravens at the 2017 Women's Rugby League World Cup.
