= Mary Jane Kirby =

- Born: July 20, 1989 (age 37)
- Height: 1.73 m (5 ft 8 in)
- Weight: 79 kg (174 lb)

Rugby union career
- Position: Hooker
Amateur team(s)
Years	Team	Apps	(Points)
–	Highland		
International career
Years	Team	Apps	(Points)
2014-	Canada		
Medal record
Women's rugby union
Representing Canada
World Cup
Silver medal – second place	2014 France	Team competition

Mary Jane Kirby (born July 20, 1989) is a Canadian rugby union player. She represented Canada at the 2014 Women's Rugby World Cup. She was in the squad that toured New Zealand in June 2014, they played test matches against the Black Ferns and the Wallaroos.
