= Joanna McGilchrist =

England international rugby union player

- Born: 27 August 1983 (age 43)
- Height: 1.8 m (5 ft 11 in)
- Weight: 76 kg (168 lb; 12 st 0 lb)

Rugby union career
- Position: Lock
Senior career
Years	Team	Apps	(Points)
- Wasps Ladies
International career
Years	Team	Apps	(Points)
2007–2014	England	63	(30)
Medal record
Representing England
Women's rugby union
Rugby World Cup
Gold medal – first place	2014 France	Team competition
Silver medal – second place	2010 England	Team competition

Joanna Gabrielle McGilchrist (born 27 August 1983) is an English rugby union player. She represented England at the 2010 Women's Rugby World Cup. She was also named in the squad to the 2014 Women's Rugby World Cup.

McGilchrist is a physiotherapist.
