= Kayla Mack =

Canada international rugby union player

- Born: May 9, 1989 (age 37) Saskatoon, Saskatchewan
- Height: 1.78 m (5 ft 10 in)
- Weight: 77 kg (170 lb)
- University: University of Saskatchewan

Rugby union career
- Position: Lock
Amateur team(s)
Years	Team	Apps	(Points)
–	Saskatoon Wild Oats		
International career
Years	Team	Apps	(Points)
2011–present	Canada		
National sevens team
Years	Team		Comps
2014-2016	Canada		
Medal record
Women's rugby union
Representing Canada
World Cup
Silver medal – second place	2014 France	Team competition

Kayla Mack (born May 9, 1989) is a Canadian rugby union player. She represented Canada at the 2014 Women's Rugby World Cup. She made her international debut at the 2011 Nations Cup against South Africa. She also made her sevens debut in 2014 at the 2013–14 Sevens World Series during the Netherlands leg in Amsterdam. In 2016, she was released from the national sevens program to join the 15s side in preparation for the 2017 World Cup.

Mack studied Kinesiology at the University of Saskatchewan.
