= Sarah Hunter =

England international rugby union player

Sarah Hunter CBE
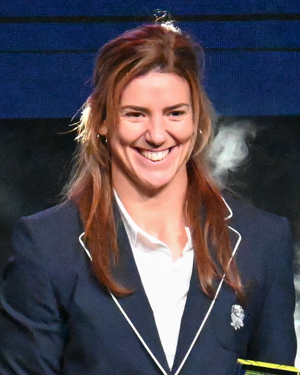
- Hunter in 2022
- Born: 19 September 1985 (age 41) North Shields, Tyne & Wear, England
- Height: 1.77 m (5 ft 10 in)
- Weight: 80 kg (176 lb)

Rugby union career
- Position: Loose forward
Senior career
Years	Team	Apps	(Points)
2004–2015	Lichfield Ladies		(0)
2015–2017	Bristol Ladies		(0)
2017– 2023	Loughborough Lightning		(0)
International career
Years	Team	Apps	(Points)
2007– 2023	England	141	(150)
Coaching career
- Years: Team
- 2023–: England (defence)
Medal record
Representing England
Women's rugby union
Rugby World Cup
Gold medal – first place	2014 France	Team competition
Silver medal – second place	2021 New Zealand	Team competition
Silver medal – second place	2017 Ireland	Team competition
Silver medal – second place	2010 England	Team competition

Sarah Alice Hunter CBE (born 19 September 1985) is an English rugby union coach and retired player. She represented England at four Rugby World Cups. At the 2021 Rugby World Cup, Hunter received her 138th international cap, passing Rochelle Clark to become England's all-time most capped rugby player.

== Early life ==
Hunter was born in North Shields in 1985. She began playing rugby league as a 9-year-old at Goathland Primary School, playing for the Longbenton and Gateshead Panthers. Sarah started playing rugby union at Novocastrians RFC in 2000 and initially played as a strong running centre. She was Players' Player of the Year before transitioning to the back row. Having moved position, she was selected for England U19s. In 2004 she left the North-East to study sports science and mathematics at Loughborough University. She went on to work for the RFU as University Rugby Development Office for the South West.

== Rugby union career ==
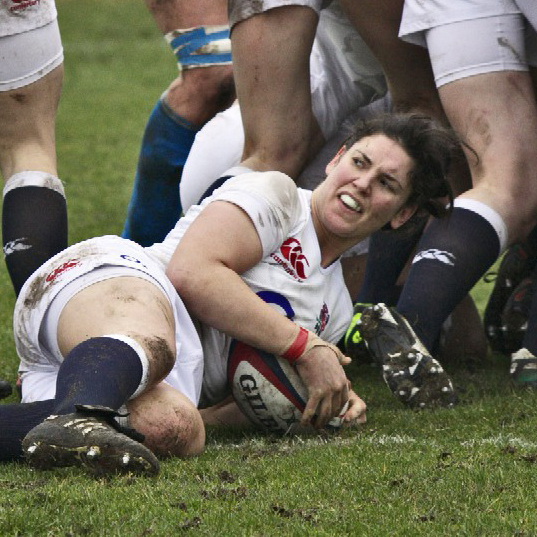
Hunter scoring a try for England against Italy in 2013

=== Club ===
At 18, Hunter joined the Lichfield Ladies. She moved to Bristol Ladies in 2015 and joined Loughborough Lightning in 2017, where she retired in 2023.

=== International ===
Hunter made her England debut in 2007. She had trained as a centre but joined the England squad as a back row player after coach Phil Forsyth moved her at Under-19s trials. She led the England team to win the 2014 Women's Rugby World Cup and won her hundredth cap in November 2017 as England played Canada in the semi-finals of the 2017 Women's Rugby World Cup. As of April 2021, Hunter is the most capped England player of all time.

In November 2020, Hunter was unable to play in the team's postponed 2020 Six Nations game due to a hamstring injury. She had also injured a nerve in her neck in October 2020, which took doctors five months to fully diagnose and left her unsure of whether she would be able to return to professional rugby. After 13 months off, Hunter returned to the international pitch in April 2021 as England beat Italy in the second round of the 2021 Women's Six Nations. She was named in the England squad for the delayed 2021 Rugby World Cup held in New Zealand in October and November 2022.

== Honours and awards ==
Hunter was appointed Member of the Order of the British Empire (MBE) in the 2015 New Year Honours and then Commander of the Order of the British Empire (CBE) in the 2023 Birthday Honours, both for services to rugby union.

She was named World Rugby Women's Player of the Year in 2016.

In 2022, Hunter was awarded an honorary degree from Loughborough University in recognition of her outstanding contribution to rugby and achievements at the highest level of international competition.
