= Emily Belchos =

Canadian rugby union player

- Born: April 27, 1995 (age 31) Barrie, Ontario
- Height: 1.72 m (5 ft 8 in)
- Weight: 75 kg (165 lb)
- School: Barrie Central Collegiate Institute
- University: University of Victoria

Rugby union career
- Position: Flyhalf
Amateur team(s)
Years	Team	Apps	(Points)
2012?-	Markham Irish		
2017-	Victoria Vikes		
Provincial / State sides
Years	Team	Apps	(Points)
2012-2013?	Ontario u-20		
International career
Years	Team	Apps	(Points)
2014?-	Canada		
2013-2014	Canada under-20		
National sevens team
Years	Team		Comps
2013?-2016	Canada		
Medal record
Women's rugby union
Representing Canada
World Cup
Silver medal – second place	2014 France	Team competition

Emily Belchos (born April 27, 1995) is a Canadian rugby union player. She represented Canada at the 2014 Women's Rugby World Cup. She toured New Zealand with the Canadian team in June 2014 in a test match tour against the Black Ferns and the Wallaroos.

== Rugby career ==
In highschool Belchos was a multi-sport athlete participating in wrestling and basketball, alongside rugby. While playing for the Markham Irish RFC senior team, she was invited to play with the U20 Ontario team and was then invited to join Canada's U20 team in 2013.

After capturing the U20 Nations Cup in 2013, Belchos was named one of the "Five to Watch" and named to the CIBC Team Next, a sponsorship program assisting the next generation of athletes.

In November 2013, Belchos competed with the undefeated Canadian team in the North American Caribbean Rugby Association NACRA 7s.

The following year, in June 2014, she travelled with the national team to a tournament in New Zealand and the next month, in July, she was named to the team that won silver at the 2014 World Cup.

In 2016, Belchos was released from the national sevens program to play on the senior 15s side in preparation for the 2017 World Cup.

In 2017, Belchos attended the University of Victoria and joined the Victoria Vikes rugby team.
