= Rochelle Clark =

England international rugby union player

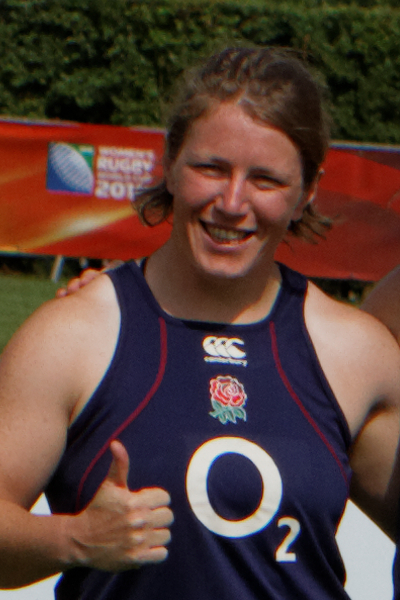
- Clark in 2014
- Born: 29 May 1981 (age 45)
- Height: 1.73 m (5 ft 8 in)
- Weight: 89 kg (196 lb; 14 st 0 lb)

Rugby union career
- Position: Prop
Amateur team(s)
Years	Team	Apps	(Points)
- Henley Hawks
Senior career
Years	Team	Apps	(Points)
2019	Saracens Women		
2017	Wasps Ladies		
2013	Worcester Valkyries		
International career
Years	Team	Apps	(Points)
2003–2018	England	137	(125)
Medal record
Representing England
Women's rugby union
Rugby World Cup
Gold medal – first place	2014 France	Team competition
Silver medal – second place	2017 Ireland	Team competition
Silver medal – second place	2010 England	Team competition
Silver medal – second place	2006 Canada	Team competition

Rochelle "Rocky" Clark, MBE (born 29 May 1981) is an English rugby union player for Saracens. She represented England at the 2006, 2010, 2014 and 2017 Women's Rugby World Cup tournaments.

Clark earned her 50th cap at the 2010 Women's Rugby World Cup which made her England's second most-capped player at the time.

She was appointed Member of the Order of the British Empire (MBE) in the 2015 New Year Honours for services to rugby.

As of 16 March 2018, Clark has 137 caps. She was the most capped player in England international history, including both men and women, surpassing Jason Leonard's men's record of 114, until Sarah Hunter received her 138th cap at the 2021 Women's Rugby World Cup

She credits hot baths and hard work as reasons for her success. She is a PT and rugby coach, and in her spare time is developing her media career. She regularly delivers motivational speeches at rugby clubs and after-dinner talks. Clark has a passion for coffee and taking her dog out for walks.

Clark is currently forwards coach at Saracens ladies' rugby club. She aspires to coach at the top level in both club and international rugby, having gained her level 4 qualification in 2019. She also coaches the Buckinghamshire u16 Girls DPP.
