= Marie-Pier Pinault-Reid =

Canadian rugby union player

- Born: December 20, 1988 (age 37)
- Height: 1.80 m (5 ft 11 in)
- Weight: 93 kg (205 lb)
- University: Universite de Laval

Rugby union career
- Position: Prop
Amateur team(s)
Years	Team	Apps	(Points)
2009-2012, 2014	Laval Rouge et Or		
2005-2015	Club de Rugby de Quebec		
2012-2013	RC Lons (Pau, France)		
2013-2014	AS Bayonne		
Provincial / State sides
Years	Team	Apps	(Points)
2012-2013	Quebec		
International career
Years	Team	Apps	(Points)
2011-2016	Canada	21	
2006-2007	Canada under-19		
Medal record
Women's rugby union
Representing Canada
World Cup
Silver medal – second place	2014 France	Team competition

Marie-Pier Pinault-Reid (born December 20, 1988) is a Canadian rugby player. She represented Canada at the 2014 Women's Rugby World Cup and was voted to the tournament Dream Team.

== International career ==
Pinault-Reid joined the national team in 2011 at the Nations Cups and retired from the national team in 2016.

== University rugby ==
During her first three years at the University of Laval in 2009–2012, she was named a RSEQ all-star, and returned in 2014 to study medicine.

== French rugby clubs ==
Before the 2014 world cup, she played in France with the Lons RC in 2012-2013 and AS Bayonne in 2013–2014.
