= Claire Allan =

English rugby union player

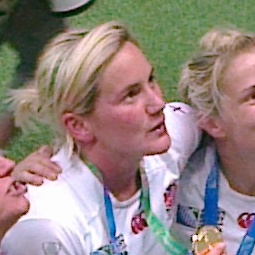
- Born: 7 May 1985 (age 41)
- Height: 1.7 m (5 ft 7 in)
- Weight: 63 kg (139 lb)

Rugby union career
- Position(s): Centre, Fullback
Senior career
Years	Team	Apps	(Points)
- Saracens
International career
Years	Team	Apps	(Points)
2007–2016	England	36	(75)
National sevens teams
Years	Team		Comps
2009–2022	England 7s		
2016	Great Britain 7s		
Medal record
Representing England
Women's rugby sevens
Commonwealth Games
Bronze medal – third place	2018 Gold Coast	Team competition
Women's rugby union
Rugby World Cup
Gold medal – first place	2014 France	Team competition

Claire Louise Allan (born 7 May 1985) is an English rugby union player. She represented England at the 2014 Women's Rugby World Cup and Great Britain in rugby sevens at the 2016 Summer Olympics.

== Career ==
Allan was a member of England's squad to the 2014 Women's Rugby World Cup. She played at both the 2009 and 2013 Rugby World Cup Sevens.

She represented Team GB at the 2016 Summer Olympics.

Allan was educated at Orleans Park School, Twickenham, and earned a BTEC in Sport and Exercise at Loughborough University. She is a police officer.
