= Kim Donaldson (rugby union) =

Canadian rugby union player

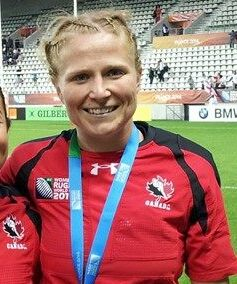
- 2014 Women's Rugby World Cup
- Born: August 24, 1983 (age 43)
- Height: 1.72 m (5 ft 8 in)
- Weight: 82 kg (181 lb)
- University: University of British Columbia

Rugby union career
- Position: Hooker
Amateur team(s)
Years	Team	Apps	(Points)
–	Aurora Barbarians		
2014	UBC Thunderbirds		
2017	Burnaby Lake Rugby Club		
International career
Years	Team	Apps	(Points)
2006?-2014?	Canada		
Coaching career
- Years: Team
- 2008: UBC Thunderbirds (assistant coach)
Medal record
Women's rugby union
Representing Canada
World Cup
Silver medal – second place	2014 France	Team competition

Kim Donaldson (born August 24, 1983) is a Canadian rugby union player. She represented Canada at the 2010 and 2014 Women's Rugby World Cup.

Donaldson has a Bachelor's degree in Anthropology from the University of British Columbia.
