= Latoya Blackwood =

Canada international rugby union player

- Born: August 19, 1985 (age 41) Montreal, Quebec
- Height: 1.75 m (5 ft 9 in)
- Weight: 77 kg (170 lb)
- University: University of Western Ontario

Rugby union career
- Position: Lock
Amateur team(s)
Years	Team	Apps	(Points)
–	Ste Anne de Bellevue RFC		
–	Western Mustangs		
–	Concordia Stingers		
International career
Years	Team	Apps	(Points)
2013-2018	Canada	31	
- Correct as of 2016-12-01
Medal record
Women's rugby union
Representing Canada
World Cup
Silver medal – second place	2014 France	Team competition

Latoya Blackwood (born August 19, 1985) is a Canadian rugby union player. She represented Canada at the 2014 Women's Rugby World Cup and 2017 Women's Rugby World Cup. She made her debut at the 2013 Nations Cup and retired in 2018.

== Early life and university ==
Blackwood lived in Brampton, Ontario during her early life and was a basketball player. She discovered rugby in high school and in her last year, she played on the boy's rugby team. Afterwards she soon joined a club in Brampton. Blackwood also played in university for the Western Mustangs from 2004 to 2009. Later, she also studied at Concordia University from 2011 to 2016, where she finished up her final year of eligibility with the Concordia Stingers.

== Club and provincial rugby ==
From 2011 to 2015, Blackwood played for the Saint Anne de Bellevue RFC and during this time, in 2012 she was selected to the Rugby Quebec provincial team.

In preparation for the 2017 World Cup, Blackwood trained with the Stade Toulousain women's rugby team where she was after a one-year contract starting in September 2015. When she returned to Canada, Blackwood moved to Victoria and started playing for the Westshore RFC.

== International rugby ==
Blackwood was a staple of the Rugby Canada women's team from August 2013 to March 2018. An enforcer on the field, coach Francois Ratier nicked named her "The Sheriff" in the lockerroom. Her favorite moments include her first cap at the 2013 Nations Cup where Team Canada defeated England for the first time in the program's history, defeating France in the 2014 Women's Rugby World Cup semi-finals, and the match versus Wales in the 2017 World Cup (in which she set up one of the top tries from the tournament by running the ball half way up the field).

Often selected as a lock, but sometimes played as a flanker, Blackwood's international test match experiences include the 2013 November tour to France and England, the 2014 tour to Australia, the 2014 World Cup, the 2015 Super Series in Alberta (during this tournament, she was considered Canada's standout player at openside flank), 2016 Super Series in Salt Lake City, the 2016 UK tour, the 2017 Can-Am Series, and the 2017 World Cup.

Blackwood was selected for 2017 NZ Summer Series but suffered a leg injury during a club game and considering retirement, but healed in time for the 2017 World Cup.

== Awards and honours ==
- 2011 - Concordia University Stingers, RSEQ Rugby All-Star
- 2011-2012 - Concordia University Stingers, Fittest Female Athlete
- 2013 - Scrum Queen's Test Match Team (15s) (bench)
- 2016 - Scrum Queen's XV Squad of the Year
- 2019 - Scrum Queen's Team of the Decade (replacement)

== Post-international rugby career ==
When Blackwood announced her retirement in March 2018, she already started her career as a public service employee of the British Columbia's provincial government. She continues to be involved with rugby as a referee and hopes to be an official at a World Cup tournament.
