= Marion Lievre =

French rugby union player

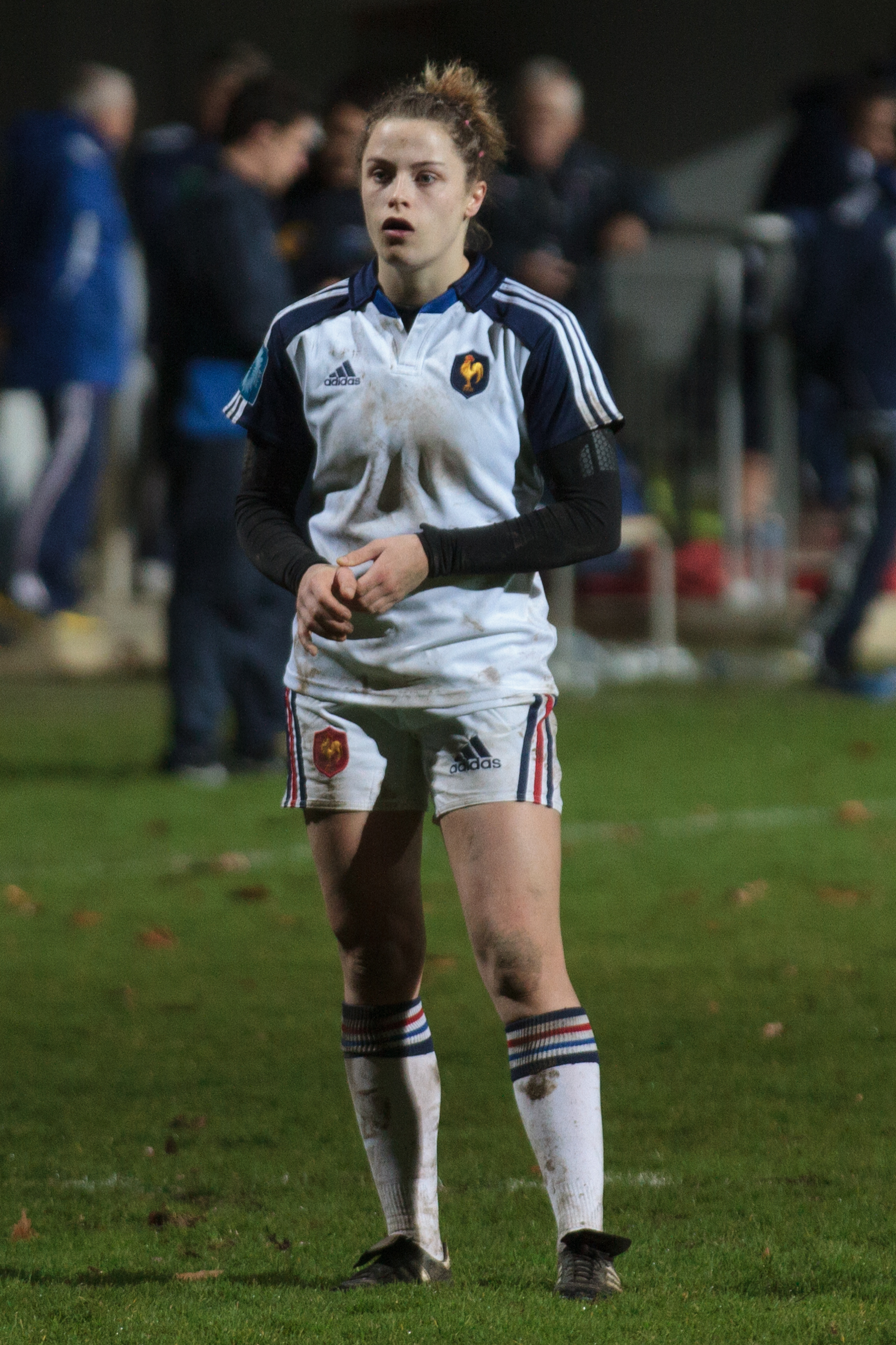
- Born: 10 January 1991 (age 35)
- Height: 1.64 m (5 ft 4 1/2 in)
- Weight: 60 kg (130 lb; 9 st 6 lb)

Rugby union career
- Position: Wing
Senior career
| Years | Team | Apps | (Points) |
- Bobigny
International career
| Years | Team | Apps | (Points) |
| | France | 7 | |

Marion Lievre (born 10 January 1991) is a French female rugby union player who played as a winger. She represented France at the 2014 Women's Rugby World Cup. She was a member of the squad that won their fourth Six Nations title in 2014.
