= Brittany Waters =

Canadian rugby union player

- Born: April 23, 1983 (age 43) Vancouver, British Columbia
- Height: 1.68 m (5 ft 6 in)
- Weight: 67 kg (148 lb)
- University: University of Victoria

Rugby union career
- Position: Wing/Center
Amateur team(s)
Years	Team	Apps	(Points)
–	Meraloma Rugby		
–	Velox Valkyries		
–	Castaway Wanderers		
International career
Years	Team	Apps	(Points)
2008–present	Canada	26	(35)
National sevens team
Years	Team		Comps
2007-2014	Canada		16
Coaching career
- Years: Team
- –: Victoria Vikes
Medal record
Representing Canada
Women's rugby union
World Cup
Silver medal – second place	2014 France	Team competition
Women's rugby sevens
World Cup 7s
Silver medal – second place	2013 Russia	Team competition

Brittany Waters (born April 23, 1983) is a Canadian rugby union player. She represented Canada at the 2010 Women's Rugby World Cup and the 2014 Women's Rugby World Cup. She made her international debut for Canada in 2008 in a match against the United States.

Waters attended the University of Victoria for her undergrad, attaining a Bachelor of Arts degree. She then went on to receive her Master of Occupational Therapy degree from the University of British Columbia.

Brittany is the current head coach of the UVic Women's Rugby Program.
