= Deven Owsiany =

American rugby union player

- Born: Deven Johanna Owsiany; June 29, 1989 (age 37)
- Education: Saint Pius X High School
- Alma mater: Pennsylvania State University
- Height: 5 ft 4 in (163 cm)
- Weight: 150 lb (68 kg)

Rugby union career
- Position: Scrum half
International career
| Years | Team | Apps | (Points) |
| 2014 | United States | 10 | |
National sevens team
| Years | Team | | Comps |
| 2012 | United States | | |

Deven Johanna Owsiany (born June 29, 1989) is an American rugby union player. She made her debut for the United States in 2014. She was named in the Eagles 2017 Women's Rugby World Cup squad. She made her sevens debut for the United States at the 2012 USA Sevens in Las Vegas.

She was honored at the Women's Sports Foundation’s 32nd Annual Salute to Athletes in 2011. She played at the 2013 Rugby World Cup Sevens in Moscow, Russia.
