= Sanita Levave =

- Born: November 8, 1988 (age 38)
- Height: 1.86 m (6 ft 1 in)
- Weight: 89 kg (196 lb)

Rugby union career
- Position: Lock
Provincial / State sides
Years	Team	Apps	(Points)
- Wellington
International career
Years	Team	Apps	(Points)
2014	New Zealand	5	

Sanita Levave (born 8 November 1988) is a women's rugby union player from Wellington, New Zealand. She plays as a Lock for Northern United, Wellington Pride and the New Zealand women's national rugby union team. She is the sister of the Hurricanes and Samoa national rugby union team player Faifili Levave.

== Career ==
Levave played netball and basketball at school but started playing rugby at St Mary's College, Wellington however at the time, St Mary's did not have a girl's rugby team so Levave was granted permission to play for Wellington Girls' College in lieu. She practiced rugby outside of school with her brother Faifili. She started playing for Northern United and was eventually called up by the Wellington Rugby Football Union to play for Wellington Pride. She made her debut for Wellington Pride in 2008. Levave aimed for a place in the New Zealand national women's rugby team however received repeated rejections owing to her lack of fitness. As a result, she started fitness work including road running which resulted in her losing 20 kg going from 107 kg to 87 kg. As a result of her improved fitness and speed, she was called up by the New Zealand Rugby Union for the New Zealand women's national team in 2014 for the International Women's Rugby Series. Afterwards she was selected to play in New Zealand's 2014 Women's Rugby World Cup squad in France. At the tournament, she was the second tallest player at 1.86m.

== Personal life ==
Levave studied for a bachelor's degree in nursing while playing rugby. She lives with her brother.
