= Burnaby Lake Rugby Club =

Canadian rugby union club based in Burnaby, British Columbia

(Canada) Burnaby Lake Rugby
- Full name: Burnaby Lake Rugby Club
- Union: Vancouver Rugby Union
- Founded: 1994; 32 years ago
- Location: Burnaby, British Columbia
- Ground: Burnaby Lake Sports Complex
- Coach: Aaron O’Flaherty

Official website
- www.burnabylakerugby.com

Burnaby Lake Rugby Club is a rugby club based in Burnaby, British Columbia.

== History ==
The Burnaby Lake Rugby Club was formed in 1994 when two Metro Vancouver rugby clubs, the Burnaby Buffaloes and the Vancouver Trojans, merged.

Because the Buffaloes played in the Fraser Valley Rugby Union and the Trojans played in the Vancouver Rugby Union, these two clubs did not have long-standing rivalries, which accounted a great deal for the success of the merger. As a result of the merger the newly formed Burnaby Lake Rugby Club (BLRC) became one of the larger clubs in the Metro Vancouver Area, consistently fielding teams at the most competitive levels in British Columbia.

The trojan horse and buffalo, as symbols of the two predecessor clubs, were added to the new clubs badge. The maple leaf represents Canada and the dogwood flower British Columbia.

The BLRC also has a long-standing association with Justice Rugby Club. The Justice Rugby Club is a social rugby club, that plays non-league invitational matches in Canada and abroad. The membership of Justice Rugby consists of police officers in the Metro Vancouver area and their friends. Many of these members are also members of the BLRC.

The Burnaby Lake Rugby Club first played in the Fraser Valley Rugby Union (FVRU) after the merger in 1994. However, the BLRC membership voted to join the Vancouver Rugby Union (VRU) during the 1995/1996 Annual General Meeting and the BLRC was accepted as a member of the VRU in 1996, where it has stayed a member since.

== Teams ==
The BLRC fields four Senior Men's teams. The Premier XV and First XV play in the British Columbia CDI Premier League. The BLRC's Third XV and Third XV(B), are part of the Lower Mainland 3rd Division League. Burnaby Lake have been crowned Provincial Champions and have had all teams make play off's and finals

BLRC is represented in the Premier Division of BC Rugby Women's League. In 2003, 2006, 2008, 2009, 2011 and 2013 the BLRC Senior Women won the BC Premier Women's Provincial Championship. The club also fields a Women's team in the Lower Mainland Second Division League that focuses on player development.

The BLRC has a mini Rugby program (ages 5 – 12) that aims to teach young rugby players the basics of running and passing, as well as the laws of the game. The club also fields teams in the U-14, U-16, U-17 and U-19 Lower Mainland Leagues.

Rugby Sevens in BC is played at tournaments throughout the Summer in a points format similar to the IRB Sevens series. The BLRC Lighthouse Sevens program have been perennial contenders in both Elite Men's and Women's Divisions. The Men have been crowned Champions 5 times and the women 4 times since the Series began in 2009.

== Facilities ==
BLRC facility consists of two dedicated match pitches and a lit all weather turf practice field. The clubhouse is situated at the Burnaby Lake Sports Complex in Burnaby.

== Notable players ==
The BLRC has produced numerous players of distinction who have played representative rugby both in Canada and internationally.

- Siaki Vikilani
- Pat Riordan
- Maria Gallo
- Mike James
- Steve Gray
- Ryan Banks
- Julia Sugawara
- Kim Donaldson
- Gabrielle Hindley (Rugby League)

== See also ==
- Vancouver Rugby Union
- British Columbia Rugby Union
- Rugby Canada
- Canadian Direct Insurance Premier League
