= Hilary Leith =

Canadian rugby union player

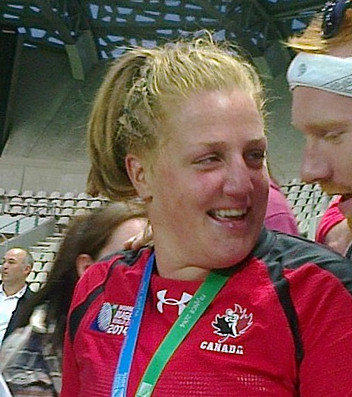
- Born: December 29, 1983 (age 42)
- Height: 1.78 m (5 ft 10 in)
- Weight: 99 kg (218 lb)
- University: University of Missouri

Rugby union career
- Position: Prop
Amateur team(s)
Years	Team	Apps	(Points)
?-2013, 2014-	Capilano		
2014	Saracens		
International career
Years	Team	Apps	(Points)
2013–present	Canada		
Medal record
Women's rugby union
Representing Canada
World Cup
Silver medal – second place	2014 France	Team competition

Hilary Leith (born December 29, 1983) is a Canadian rugby union player. She represented Canada at the 2014 Women's Rugby World Cup and was named to the tournament Dream Team. She made her international debut in the 2013 Nations Cup. Later that year she played for the Saracens.

She participated in wrestling and pursued it after high school after receiving a wrestling scholarship to the University of Missouri.
