= Kay Wilson =

England international rugby union player

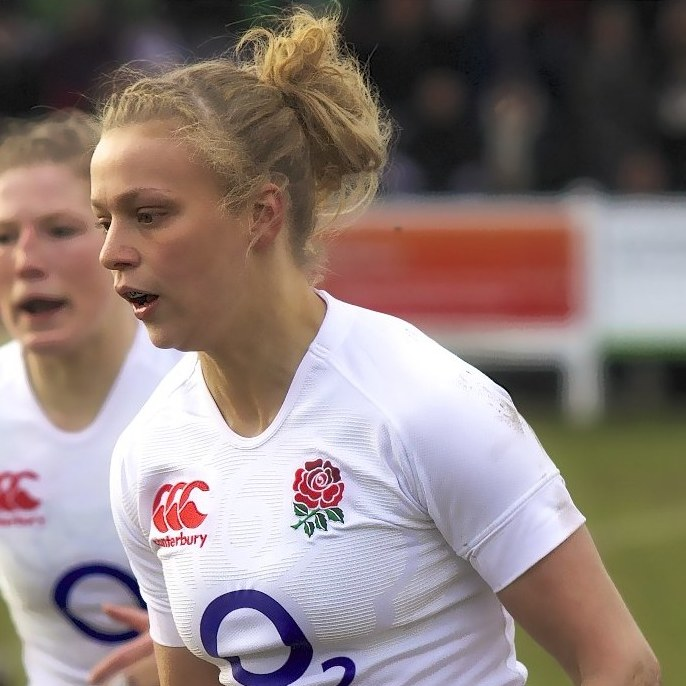
- Born: 19 September 1991 (age 35)
- Height: 1.67 m (5 ft 5 1/2 in)
- Weight: 68 kg (150 lb; 10 st 10 lb)

Rugby union career
- Position(s): Wing, Fullback
Senior career
Years	Team	Apps	(Points)
2016	Richmond Women		
2014	Thurrock T-Birds		
2013	Bristol Ladies		
International career
Years	Team	Apps	(Points)
2011–2017	England	49	(160)
National sevens team
Years	Team		Comps
2012	England 7s		
Medal record
Representing England
Women's rugby union
Rugby World Cup
Gold medal – first place	2014 France	Team competition
Silver medal – second place	2017 Ireland	Team competition

Kay Wilson (born 19 September 1991) is an English rugby union player for England. She was included in the 2014 and 2017 Women's Rugby World Cup's.

== Career ==
Wilson was born in 1991 and she was playing at the age of five and she played for Old Caterhamians, Warlingham and Dorking whilst a child. She attended Saint Bede's Secondary School in Redhill, Surrey.

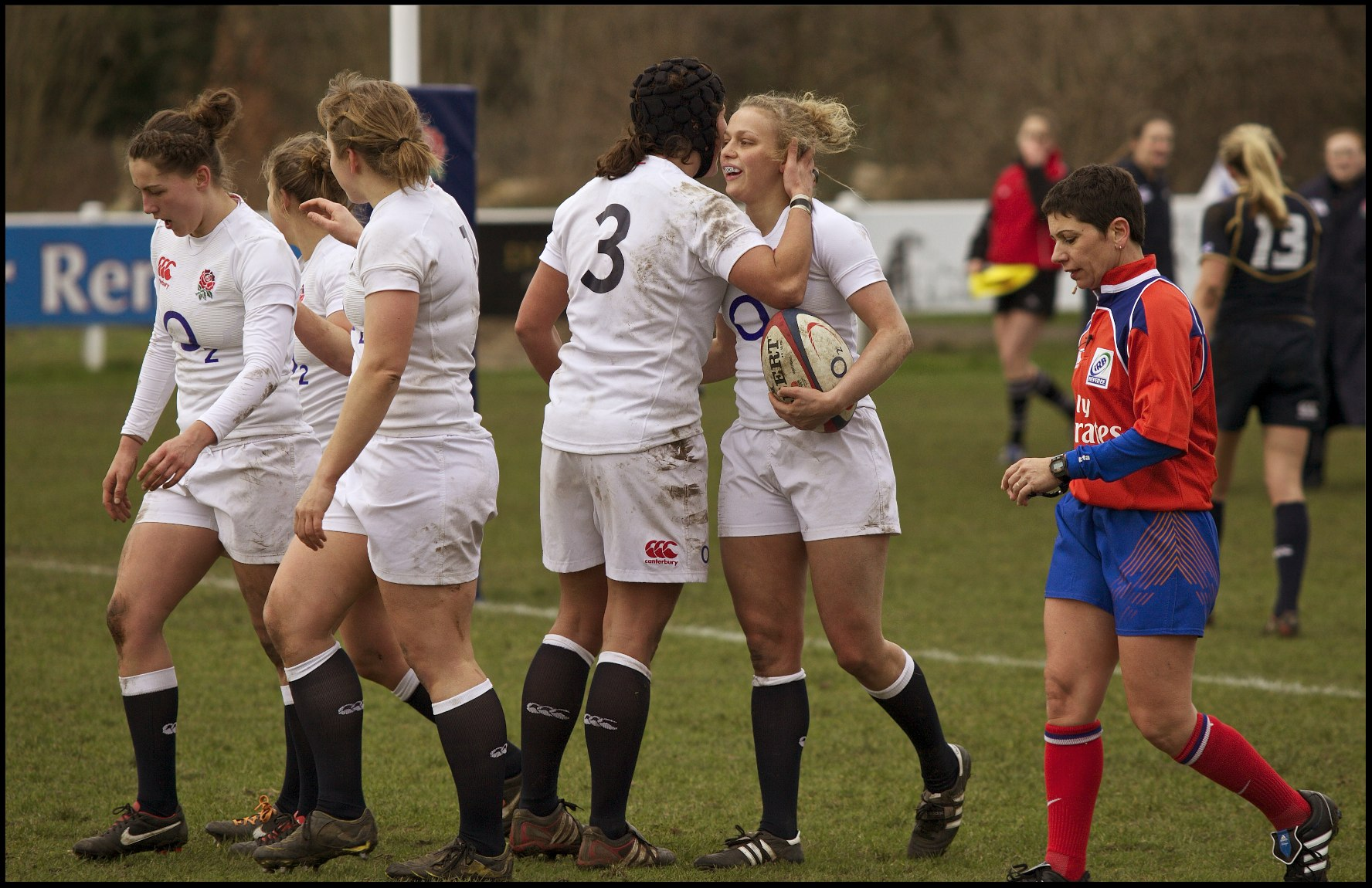
Kay Wilson after a try in England v Scotland (RBS 6 Nations)

She graduated with a degree in Sports Development from the Cardiff Metropolitan University. Wilson also played for the Cardiff Met's Ladies RFC.

Wilson made her debut at the 2011 IRB Nations Cup.

She is a winger and in March 2017 she scored seven tries against Scotland during a 64–0 win by England in the Six Nations at Twickenham. This contributed to her position as top scorer in the Six Nations that year.
