= Amy Perrett =

Rugby union referee

- Born: Amy Perrett; 1990 or 1991 (age 35–36) Sydney, Australia

Rugby union career
Refereeing career
Years	Competition	Apps
2014–pres.	Women's Test matches	
2012–pres.	Women's Sevens World Series	
2016	Olympic Sevens	5
2016	National Rugby Championship	2
- Correct as of 1 January 2018

Amy Perrett (born 1990 or 1991) is an Australian professional rugby union referee. She has refereed at the Women's Rugby World Cup, including the final in 2014, as well as the Women's Sevens World Series and Summer Olympics.

== Early life ==
Amy Perrett was raised in Sydney's north. From the age of seven to twelve she played junior rugby in mixed teams alongside her twin brother, Paul. In 2003, when no longer allowed to play against boys and with no girls teams available at the time, Perrett took up rugby refereeing.

== Refereeing career ==
Perrett joined the NSW Referees Association in 2008 and then began her senior refereeing career. She made her World Rugby Women's Sevens Series debut as a referee in 2012, and went on to the 2016 Olympic Games where she was in charge of the women's bronze medal match between Canada and Great Britain.

Within the fifteen-a-side game, Perrett has been a regular appointment to the Women's Six Nations Championship since 2014. She refereed the 2014 Women's World Cup final won by England 21–9 against Canada in Paris.

In 2016, Perrett was the first woman appointed to referee men's teams in Australia's National Rugby Championship, after becoming the first female assistant referee in Super Rugby three months earlier.

Further, in 2020 on 29 August, Perrett became the first female referee in Super Rugby, refereeing the Brumbies vs the Western Force.

During the 2020 Summer Olympics, she was widely criticised on social media by Fijian fans when she refereed the women's semi-final match between Fiji and New Zealand. The fans claimed that Perrett officiated the match in an unfair way.
