= 2014 Women's Rugby World Cup =

Rugby union event in France

French: Coupe du Monde de Rugby Féminin 2014

Tournament details
- Host nation: France
- Dates: 1 August – 17 August 2014
- No. of nations: 12

Final positions
- Champions: England (2nd title)
- Runner-up: Canada
- Third place: France

Tournament statistics
- Matches played: 30
- Attendance: 40,000 (1,333 per match)
- Tries scored: 175 (average 5.83 per match)
- Top scorer(s): (England) Emily Scarratt (70)
- Most tries: (New Zealand) Selica Winiata (6) (New Zealand) Shakira Baker (6)
- Points scored: 1,264 (average 42.13 per match)

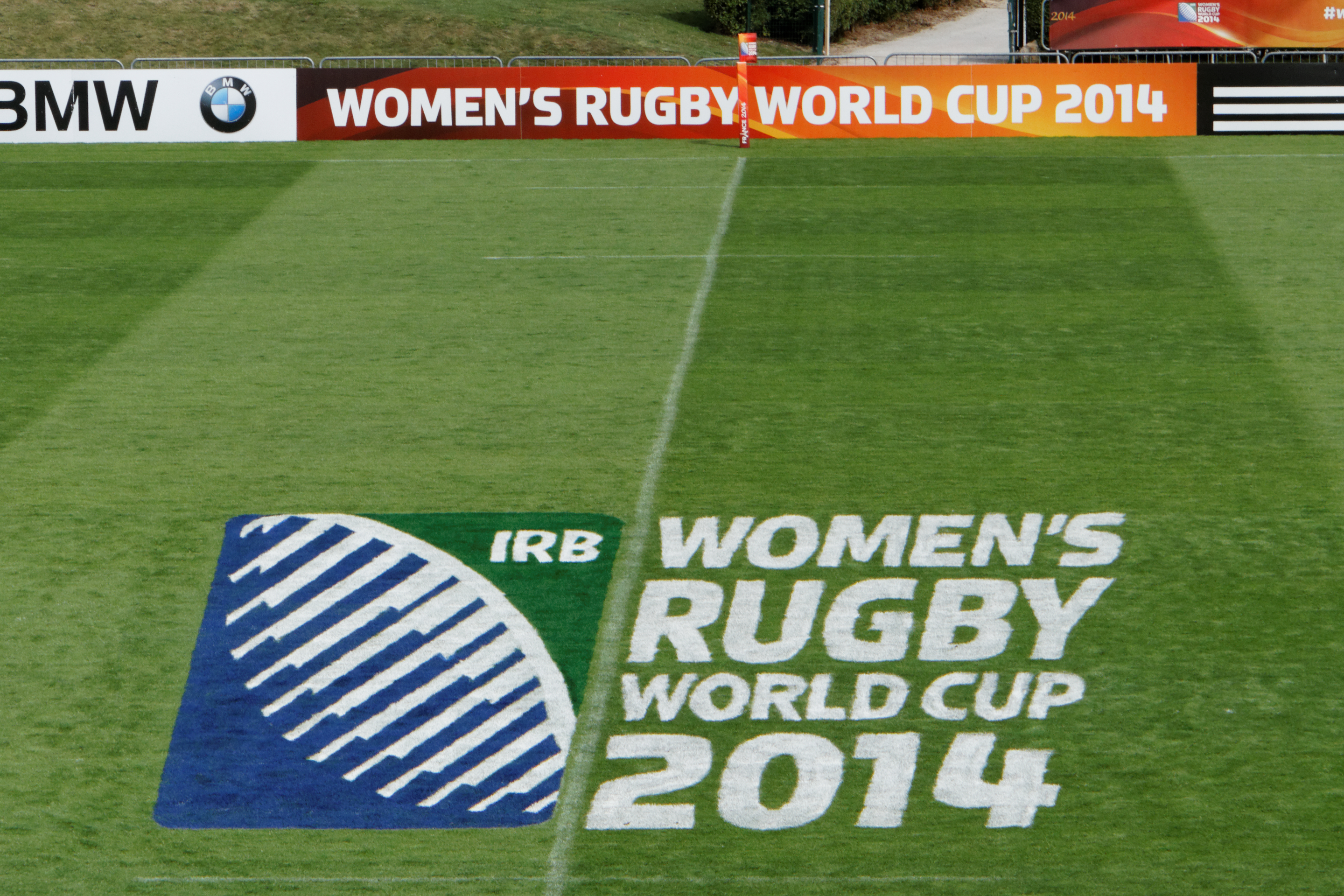

The 2014 Women's Rugby World Cup was the seventh edition of the Women's Rugby World Cup, and the sixth held in Europe. The World Cup Final took place on 17 August.

All of the pool games for the World Cup took place at the Centre National du Rugby (CNR) in Marcoussis and Marcoussis Rugby Club with the French union adopting the concept of restricting the tournament to one or two locations as in the 2010 Women's Rugby World Cup in London. Marcoussis is about 20 miles south of Paris.

The knockout stages of the tournament also saw matches played at the CNR in Marcoussis, with the semi-finals, Bronze Final and Final taking place at Stade Jean-Bouin in the French capital – home of Stade Français.

The matches took place on 1, 5, 9, and 13 August with the final played on 17 August.

The tournament format was the same as in 2010, with 12 teams split into three pools of four. The pool allocation draw took place once all 12 teams were confirmed.

England won the final 21–9 against Canada on 17 August.

With the inclusion of Rugby 7s at the 2016 Summer Olympics, this was the last Women's Rugby World Cup to be held in an even-numbered non-leap year. All Women's Rugby World Cup matches are currently held in the odd-numbered years alternating with the men's counterpart, starting with the 2017 Women's Rugby World Cup in Ireland.

== Bidding process ==
On 27 August 2009 the International Rugby Board (IRB; now known as World Rugby) announced that it was inviting bids to host the 2014 event. Unions had until 30 October 2009 to express an interest with the chosen host being announced on 12 May 2010. The announcement was an important development in the history of women's rugby as the IRB had never previously announced a competition to host a Women's World Cup with such publicity, nor so far ahead of the event. The chosen hosts for 2014 would also have had four years to prepare – twice as long as any previous host. The announcement was also significant because, for the first time, the IRB included the "unofficial" 1991 and 1994 World Cups in their official list of previous tournaments.

On 21 December 2009, the IRB announced the four nations that formally applied to host the 2014 Women's Rugby World Cup:

- Kazakhstan
- New Zealand (bid subsequently withdrawn, in favour of Samoa)
- Samoa
- United States

However, after delaying the announcement until September 2010, the IRB eventually announced that, due to problems with the existing bids, they were reopening applications. On 30 June 2011, the IRB announced that the tournament would be held in France.

== Qualifying ==
France, as the host nation, qualified automatically. The top three teams from the 2010 tournament, New Zealand, England, and Australia, also qualified automatically. Canada and the United States qualified due to there being no interest from other North or South American unions.

=== Qualified teams ===
Africa	Americas	Europe	Oceania	Asia
South Africa	Canada (AQ); United States (AQ)	England (AQ); France (Hosts); Ireland; Spain; Wales	Australia (AQ); New Zealand (Holders); Samoa	Kazakhstan

== Match officials ==
In April 2014 the IRB announced a panel of 14 match officials for the tournament, including eight referees and six assistant. New Zealand provided two of the referees in the form of Jess Beard and Nicky Inwood, while there will be one each from United States, England, South Africa, Ireland, Australia and Canada. England provided two assistant referees with the others coming from Italy, France, Scotland and Spain. Nicky Inwood, Sherry Trumbull and Clare Daniels were selected for 2010 Women's Rugby World Cup, which took place in England. Indeed, Inwood and Daniels also refereed at the 2006 edition in Canada.

In August 2014, it was announced that Australian referee Amy Perrett would adjudicate the final.

Referees (8)

- (New Zealand) Jess Beard
- (United States) Leah Berard
- (England) Claire Hodnett
- (New Zealand) Nicky Inwood
- (South Africa) Marlize Jordaan
- (Ireland) Helen O'Reilly
- (Australia) Amy Perrett
- (Canada) Sherry Trumbull

Assistant referees (6)

- (Italy) Beatrice Benvenuti
- (England) Sara Cox
- (England) Clare Daniels
- (France) Marie Lematte
- (Spain) Alhambra Nievas
- (Scotland) Alex Pratt

== Pool stage ==
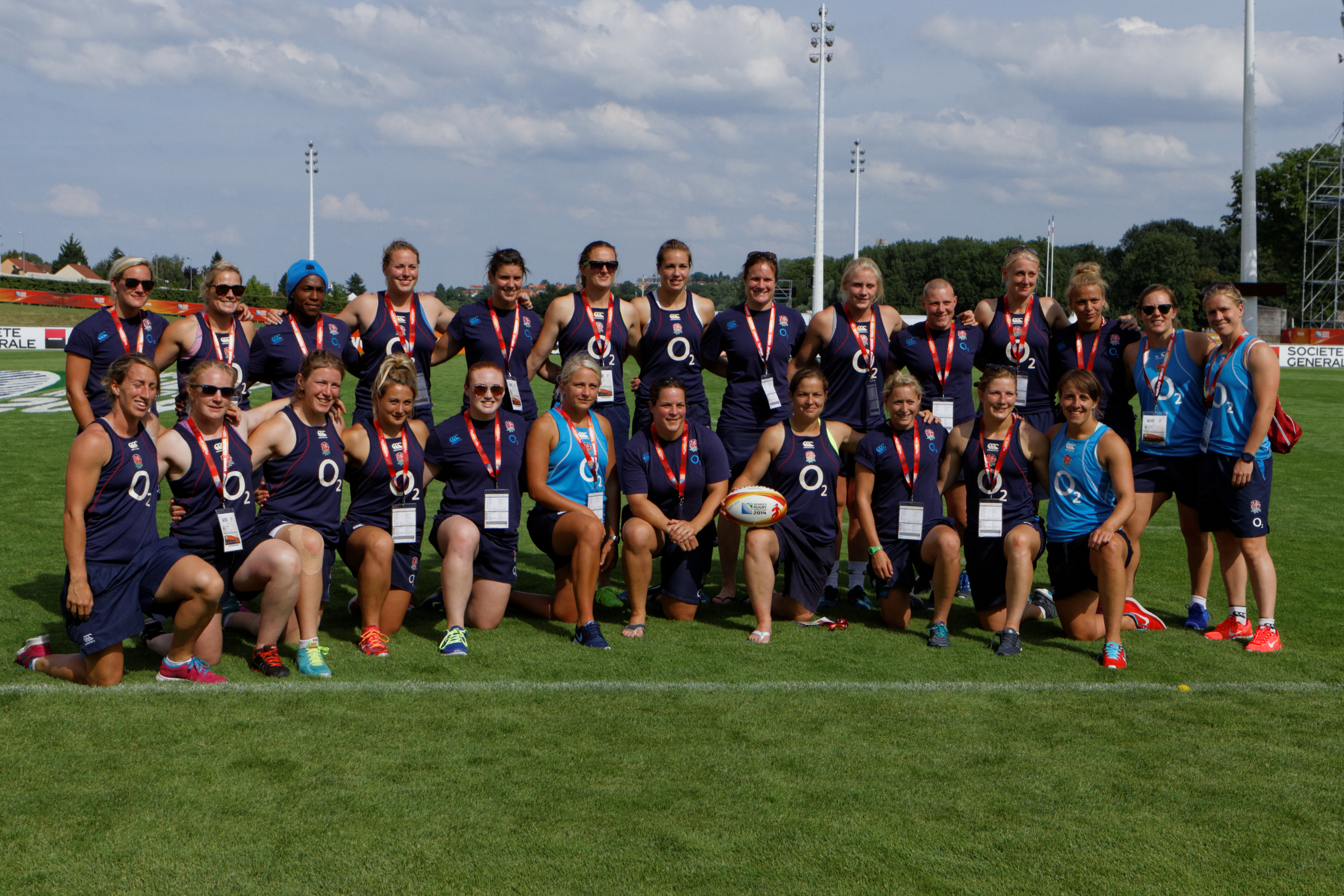

The pool draw took place on 30 October 2013 at Hotel de Ville, Paris. The twelve qualified teams were organised into four bands:

Band 1: New Zealand, England, Australia
Band 2: Canada, USA, France
Band 3: Ireland, Wales, Spain
Band 4: Kazakhstan, Samoa, South Africa

Each pool was a single round-robin of six games, in which each team played one match against each of the other teams in the same pool. Teams were awarded four points for a win, two points for a draw and none for a defeat of more than seven points. A team scoring four or more tries in one match earned a bonus point, as did teams that lost by seven points or fewer.

Qualified for semi-finals
Qualified for 5th place playoff
Qualified for 9th place playoff

=== Pool A ===
Team	Pld	W	D	L	TF	PF	PA	+/−	BP	Pts
England	3	2	1	0	17	123	21	+102	2	12
Canada	3	2	1	0	12	86	25	+61	2	12
Spain	3	1	0	2	8	51	81	−30	1	5
Samoa	3	0	0	3	2	15	148	−133	0	0

1 August 2014

Canada	31–5	Spain
	Team Sheet

CNR, Marcoussis Pitch 2
Referee: Nicky Inwood (New Zealand)

1 August 2014

England	65–3	Samoa
	Team Sheet

CNR, Marcoussis Pitch 1
Referee: Amy Perrett (Australia)

5 August 2014

England	45–5	Spain
	Team Sheet

CNR, Marcoussis Pitch 1
Referee: Jess Beard (New Zealand)

5 August 2014

Canada	42–7	Samoa
	Team Sheet

CNR, Marcoussis Pitch 2
Referee: Helen O'Reilly (Ireland)

9 August 2014

Spain	41–5	Samoa
	Team Sheet

CNR, Marcoussis Pitch 2
Referee: Claire Hodnett (England)

9 August 2014

England	13–13	Canada
	Team Sheet

CNR, Marcoussis Pitch 1
Referee: Amy Perrett (Australia)

=== Pool B ===
Team	Pld	W	D	L	TF	PF	PA	+/−	BP	Pts
Ireland	3	3	0	0	10	80	36	+44	1	13
New Zealand	3	2	0	1	20	127	25	+102	3	11
United States	3	1	0	2	10	67	64	+3	2	6
Kazakhstan	3	0	0	3	2	17	166	−149	0	0

1 August 2014

New Zealand	79–5	Kazakhstan
	Team Sheet

CNR, Marcoussis Pitch 2
Referee: Claire Hodnett (England)

1 August 2014

United States	17–23	Ireland
	Team Sheet

CNR, Marcoussis Pitch 2
Referee: Sherry Trumbull (Canada)

5 August 2014

United States	47–7	Kazakhstan
	Team Sheet

CNR, Marcoussis Pitch 2
Referee: Alhambra Nievas (Spain)

5 August 2014

New Zealand	14–17	Ireland
	Team Sheet

CNR, Marcoussis Pitch 1
Referee: Leah Berard (United States)

9 August 2014

Ireland	40–5	Kazakhstan
	Team Sheet

CNR, Marcoussis Pitch 2
Referee: Nicky Inwood (New Zealand)

9 August 2014

New Zealand	34–3	United States
	Team Sheet

CNR, Marcoussis Pitch 1
Referee: Sherry Turnbull (Canada)

=== Pool C ===
Team	Pld	W	D	L	TF	PF	PA	+/−	BP	Pts
France	3	3	0	0	15	98	6	+92	2	14
Australia	3	2	0	1	6	54	23	+31	0	8
Wales	3	1	0	2	4	38	54	−16	1	5
South Africa	3	0	0	3	0	9	116	−107	0	0

1 August 2014

Australia	26–3	South Africa
	Team Sheet

CNR, Marcoussis Pitch 1
Referee: Leah Berard (United States)

1 August 2014

France	26–0	Wales
	Team Sheet

CNR, Marcoussis Pitch 1
Referee: Helen O'Reilly (Ireland)

5 August 2014

Australia	25–3	Wales
	Team Sheet

CNR, Marcoussis Pitch 2
Referee: Sherry Trumbull (Canada)

5 August 2014

France	55–3	South Africa
	Team Sheet

CNR, Marcoussis Pitch 1
Referee: Amy Perrett (Australia)

9 August 2014

Wales	35–3	South Africa
	Team Sheet

CNR, Marcoussis Pitch 2
Referee: Jessica Beard (New Zealand)

9 August 2014

Australia	3–17	France
	Team Sheet

CNR, Marcoussis Pitch 1
Referee: Leah Berard (United States)

== Finals ==
=== Knockout rankings ===
At the completion of the pool stage, teams were ranked first according to their position within their pool and then by competition points. The top four teams progressed to the tournament semi-finals, teams ranked 5–8 progressed to the 5th to 8th play-offs, and the teams ranked 9–12 progressed to the 9th to 12th play-offs.

Qualified for semi-finals
Qualified for 5th to 8th playoffs
Qualified for 9th to 12th playoffs

Seed	Team	Pld	W	D	L	TF	TA	TD	PF	PA	+/−	BP	Pos	Pts
1	France	3	3	0	0	15	0	15	98	6	+92	2	1	14
2	Ireland	3	3	0	0	10	4	6	80	36	+44	1	1	13
3	England	3	2	1	0	17	3	14	123	21	+102	2	1	12
4	Canada	3	2	1	0	12	3	9	86	25	+61	2	2	12
5	New Zealand	3	2	0	1	20	3	17	127	25	+102	3	2	11
6	Australia	3	2	0	1	6	2	4	54	23	+31	0	2	8
7	United States	3	1	0	2	10	9	1	67	64	+3	2	3	6
8	Wales	3	1	0	2	4	7	−3	38	54	−16	1	3	5
9	Spain	3	1	0	2	8	11	−3	51	81	−30	1	3	5
10	South Africa	3	0	0	3	0	16	−16	9	116	−107	0	4	0
11	Samoa	3	0	0	3	2	22	−20	15	148	−133	0	4	0
12	Kazakhstan	3	0	0	3	3	27	−24	17	166	−149	0	4	0

=== Tie Breakers ===
Ties on competition points were broken in the following order:
1. Winner of the match between the two teams (does not apply to teams in different pools);
2. Difference between points scored and points conceded;
3. Difference between tries scored and tries conceded;
4. Most points scored;
5. Most tries scored;
6. Coin toss.

=== Rankings Play-offs 9 to 12 ===
Semi-finals
13 August 2014
South Africa	25
Samoa	24
13 August 2014
Spain	18
Kazakhstan	5

Final
17 August 2014
South Africa	0
Spain	36
Third place
17 August 2014
Samoa	31
Kazakhstan	0

Semi-finals

Test: 1083	13 August 2014	South Africa	25–24	Samoa	CNR, Marcoussis Pitch 1
	14:00	Try: Zandile Nojoko 1', Rachelle Geldenhuys 31', Veroeshka Grain 60'; Con: Zenay Jordaan 1', 31'; Pen: Zenay Jordaan 15', 20'; Cards: Celeste Adonis (yellow card) 46'	Team Sheet	Try: Bella Milo 4', 34', Merenaite Faitala-Mariner 16'; Con: Bella Milo 4', 16', 34'; Pen: Bella Milo 47'	Referee: Alhambra Nievas (Spain)

Test: 1084	13 August 2014	Spain	18–5	Kazakhstan	CNR, Marcoussis Pitch 1
	16:15	Try: Lourdes Alameda 53', Rocio Garcia 79'; Con: Patricia Garcia 79'; Pen: Patricia Garcia 37', 70'	Team Sheet	Try: Anastassiya Khamova 34'; Cards: Oxana Shadrina (yellow card) 40', Natalya Kamendrovskaya (yellow card) 56'	Referee: Sherry Turnbull (Canada)

11th Place Playoff

Test: 1089	17 August 2014	Samoa	31–0	Kazakhstan	CNR, Marcoussis Pitch 1
	12:00	Try: Taliilagi Mefi 9', 22'; Tile Start 44', Helen Collins 52', Bella Milo 56'; Con: Bella Milo 9', 22', 44'	Team Sheet		Referee: Marlize Jordaan (South Africa)

9th Place Playoff

Test: 1090	17 August 2014	South Africa	0–36	Spain	CNR, Marcoussis Pitch 1
	14:00	Cards: Shona-Leah Weston (yellow card) 74'	Team Sheet	Try: Patricia Garcia 19', 78', Barbara Pla 33', Penalty Try 65'; Eli Martinez 80'; Con: Patricia Garcia 19', 33' 65', Helen Roca 78'; Pen: Patricia Garcia 16'	Referee: Jessica Beard (New Zealand)

=== Rankings Play-offs 5 to 8 ===
Semi-finals
13 August 2014
Australia	20
United States	23
13 August 2014
New Zealand	63
Wales	7

Final
17 August 2014
United States	5
New Zealand	55
Third place
17 August 2014
Australia	30
Wales	3

Semi-finals

Test: 1085	13 August 2014	Australia	20–23	United States	CNR, Marcoussis Pitch 1
	18:30	Try: Shannon Parry 2', Cobie-Jane Morgan 22', Liz Patu 50'; Con: Ashleigh Hewson 2'; Pen: Ashleigh Hewson 64'; Cards: Michelle Milward (yellow card) 79'	Team Sheet	Try: Jillion Potter 43', Carmen Farmer 61', Vanesha McGee 68'; Con: Kimber Rozier 68'; Pen: Sadie Anderson 8', Kimber Rozier 79'	Referee: Jessica Beard (New Zealand)

Test: 1086	13 August 2014	New Zealand	63–7	Wales	Stade Jean-Bouin, Paris, France
	15:45	Try: Shakira Baker 6', 18', 26', 73', Selica Winiata 15', 53', Aroha Savage 37', Linda Itunu 43', Honey Hireme 56', Rawinia Everitt 66', Amiria Rule 80'+1'; Con: Kendra Cocksedge 6', 43', 53', Kelly Brazier 73'	Team Sheet	Try: Sioned Harries 24'; Con: Robyn Wilkins 24'; Cards: Rachel Taylor (yellow card) 65'	Referee: Claire Hodnett (England)

7th Place Playoff

Test: 1091	17 August 2014	Australia	30–3	Wales	CNR, Marcoussis Pitch 1
	16:00	Try: Liz Patu 17', Dalena Dennison 26', Tricia Brown 64', Sharni Williams 76', Cobie-Jane Morgan 80'; Con: Ashleigh Hewson 80'; Pen: Ashleigh Hewson 60'	Team Sheet	Pen: Robyn Wilkins 30'	Referee: Claire Hodnett (England)

5th Place Playoff

Test: 1092	17 August 2014	United States	5–55	New Zealand	Stade Jean-Bouin, Paris, France
	14:15	Try: Kimber Rozier 49'	Team Sheet	Try: Aroha Savage 15', Rawinia Everitt 24', Shakira Baker 31', Selica Winiata 34', Honey Hireme 37', 43', 59', 77', Aleisha Nelson 70'; Con: Kelly Brazier 31', 34', 37', 59', 70'	Referee: Helen O'Reilly (Ireland)

=== Semi-finals and final ===
Semi-finals
13 August 2014
Ireland	7
England	40
13 August 2014
France	16
Canada	18

Final
17 August 2014
England	21
Canada	9
Third place
17 August 2014
Ireland	18
France	25

Semi-finals

Test: 1087	13 August 2014	Ireland	7–40	England	Stade Jean-Bouin, Paris, France
	18:00	Try: Alison Miller 16'; Con: Niamh Briggs 16'	Report	Try: Rochelle Clark 25'; Katherine Merchant 36'; Kay Wilson 57'; Marlie Packer 70', 74'; Con: Emily Scarratt 36'; Ceri Large 70', 74'; Pen: Emily Scarratt 33', 40', 47'	Referee: Amy Perrett (Australia)

Test: 1088	13 August 2014	France	16–18	Canada	Stade Jean-Bouin, Paris, France
	20:45	Try: Assa Koita, Safi N'Diaye 65'; Pen: Sandrine Agricole 6', 34'; Cards: Caroline Ladagnous (yellow card) 28'	Team Sheet	Try: Elissa Alarie 42', Magali Harvey 46'; Con: Magali Harvey 46'; Pen: Magali Harvey 29', 40'+3'; Cards: Mary Jane Kirby (yellow card) 76'	Referee: Helen O'Reilly (Ireland)

3rd Place Playoff

Test: 1093	17 August 2014	Ireland	18–25	France	Stade Jean-Bouin, Paris, France
	16:30	Try: Niamh Briggs 6', Grace Davitt 40'; Con: Niamh Briggs 6'; Pen: Niamh Briggs 27', 61'	Report	Try: Gaelle Mignot 13', Jessy Tremouliere 31', Elodie Guiglion 47', 80'+1'; Con: Sandrine Agricole 13'; Pen: Jessy Tremouliere 66'	Referee: Sherry Turnbull (Canada)

Final

Test: 1094	17 August 2014	England	21–9	Canada	Stade Jean-Bouin, Paris, France
	18:45	Try: Danielle Waterman 33'; Emily Scarratt 74'; Con: Emily Scarratt 74'; Pen: Emily Scarratt 11', 25', 60'	Report	Pen: Magali Harvey 40', 45', 58'	Referee: Amy Perrett (Australia)

== Statistics ==
=== Points scorers ===
Pos	Name	Team	T	C	P	D	Pts
1	Emily Scarratt	England	2	15	10	0	70
2	Magali Harvey	Canada	4	10	7	0	61
3	Kelly Brazier	New Zealand	3	13	3	0	50
4	Niamh Briggs	Ireland	2	6	6	0	40
5	Ashleigh Hewson	Australia	1	5	8	0	39

=== Try scorers ===
Pos	Name	Team	Tries
1	Selica Winiata	New Zealand	6
1	Shakira Baker	New Zealand	6
3	Honey Hireme	New Zealand	5
4	Marlie Packer	England	4
4	Kay Wilson	England	4
4	Magali Harvey	Canada	4
4	Sioned Harries	Wales	4
4	Tricia Brown	Australia	4

=== Discipline ===
1 red card (red card)

- (Samoa) Soteria Pulumu (5-match suspension)

Suspension following citing

- (Wales) Rebecca de Filippo (2-week suspension) in match against New Zealand
- (South Africa) Mandisa Williams (16-week suspension) in match against Australia

2 yellow cards (yellow card) (yellow card)

- (South Africa) Celeste Adonis
- (Kazakhstan) Oxana Shadrina
- (Wales) Rachel Taylor
- (South Africa) Shona-Leah Weston

1 yellow card (yellow card)

- (Australia) Chloe Buttler
- (Samoa) Helen Collins
- (Wales) Jenny Davies
- (Canada) Olivia DeMerchant
- (New Zealand) Linda Itunu
- (Kazakhstan) Natalya Kamendrovskaya
- (Canada) Mary Jane Kirby
- (France) Caroline Ladagnous
- (Samoa) Rita Lilii
- (Australia) Michelle Milward
- (Samoa) Taliilagi Mefi
- (Ireland) Claire Molloy
- (England) Marlie Packer
- (Australia) Shannon Parry
- (Australia) Rebecca Smyth
- (United States) Shaina Turley
- (United States) Sarah Walsh
- (Canada) Brittany Waters

== Sources ==
- Rugby World Cup Women’s Stats Archive
- Women's Rugby Data

== See also ==
- Women's Rugby World Cup
- Rugby World Cup
- Rugby World Cup Sevens
