= List of England women's national rugby union team matches =

The following is a list of England women's national rugby union team international matches.

== Overall ==
England's overall international match record against all nations, updated to 18th of May 2026, is as follows:

	Games played	Won	Drawn	Lost	Percentage of wins
Total	344	297	4	43	86.63%

== Legend ==
Won	Lost	Drawn	Yet to Play

== 1987 to 1992 ==
Test	Date	Opponent	PF	PA	Venue	Event
1	5 April 1987	Wales	22	4	Pontypool Park, Pontypool	
2	24 April 1988	Wales	36	6	Newport RFC, Newport	
3	15 October 1988	Sweden	40	0	Waterloo	
4	12 February 1989	Wales	38	4	Moseley RFC, Esher	
5	11 February 1990	Wales	18	12	Neath RFC, Neath	
6	21 February 1990	Netherlands	26	0	Utrecht	
7	24 March 1991	Wales	24	13	Waterloo	
8	6 April 1991	Spain	12	0	Swansea	1991 Rugby World Cup
9	8 April 1991	Italy	25	9	Llanharan	1991 Rugby World Cup
10	12 April 1991	France	13	0	Cardiff Arms Park, Cardiff	1991 Rugby World Cup
11	14 April 1991	United States	6	19	Cardiff Arms Park, Cardiff	1991 Rugby World Cup (silver)
12	9 February 1992	Wales	14	10	Cardiff Arms Park, Cardiff	

== 1993 to 1996 ==
Test	Date	Opponent	PF	PA	Venue	Event
13	14 March 1993	Wales	23	5	Northampton	
14	8 June 1993	United States	17	6	Fletcher's Fields, Markham	1993 Canada Cup
15	10 June 1993	Canada	12	8	Wanderers, Ajax	1993 Canada Cup
16	12 June 1993	Wales	38	0	Fletcher's Fields, Markham	1993 Canada Cup
17	13 February 1994	Wales	11	10	Bridgend	
18	18 February 1994	France	32	8	Wolverhampton	
19	11 April 1994	Russia	66	0	Boroughmuir	1994 Rugby World Cup
20	15 April 1994	Scotland	26	0	Boroughmuir	1994 Rugby World Cup
21	17 April 1994	Canada	24	10	Gala RFC, Galashiels	1994 Rugby World Cup
22	20 April 1994	France	18	6	Gala RFC, Galashiels	1994 Rugby World Cup
23	24 April 1994	United States	38	23	Edinburgh Academicals, Edinburgh	1994 Rugby World Cup (gold)
24	18 December 1994	Netherlands	30	5	Loftus Road, London	
25	12 December 1995	Wales	25	0	Sale RFC, Sale	
26	4 February 1996	Wales	56	3	Leicester	1996 Home Nations
27	18 February 1996	France	15	6	Villard-Bonnot	
28	3 March 1996	Scotland	12	8	Meggetland Stadium, Edinburgh	1996 Home Nations
29	17 March 1996	Ireland	12	8	Sunbury	1996 Home Nations

== 1997 ==
Test	Date	Opponent	PF	PA	Venue	Event
30	5 January 1997	Spain	17	15	Leeds	
31	26 January 1997	Scotland	23	3	Blackheath, London	1997 Home Nations
32	9 February 1997	Ireland	32	0	Limerick	1997 Home Nations
33	23 February 1997	France	15	17	Northampton	
34	9 March 1997	Wales	24	22	Worcester	1997 Home Nations
35	2 April 1997	Netherlands	40	3	Nice	1997 European Championship
36	4 April 1997	France	15	10	Nice	1997 European Championship
37	6 April 1997	Scotland	24	8	Nice	1997 European Championship
38	13 August 1997	New Zealand	0	67	Burnham	
39	31 August 1997	Germany	84	0	Hürth	

== 1998 ==
Test	Date	Opponent	PF	PA	Venue	Event
40	1 February 1998	France	13	5	Villeneuve-d'Ascq, Lille	
41	15 February 1998	Wales	29	12	Waterloo	1998 Home Nations
42	21 March 1998	Scotland	5	8	Stewarts Melville, Edinburgh	1998 Home Nations
43	5 April 1998	Ireland	62	8	Worcester	1998 Home Nations
44	2 May 1998	Sweden	75	0	Amsterdam	1998 Rugby World Cup
45	5 May 1998	Canada	72	6	Amsterdam	1998 Rugby World Cup
46	9 May 1998	Australia	30	13	Amsterdam	1998 Rugby World Cup
47	12 May 1998	New Zealand	11	44	Amsterdam	1998 Rugby World Cup
48	16 May 1998	Canada	31	15	Amsterdam	1998 Rugby World Cup (bronze)

== 1999 ==
Test	Date	Opponent	PF	PA	Venue	Event
49	28 February 1999	Scotland	34	7	Richmond, London	1999 Five Nations
50	7 March 1999	Ireland	56	0	Dublin	1999 Five Nations
51	21 March 1999	France	13	8	Worcester	1999 Five Nations
52	10 April 1999	Wales	83	11	Swansea	1999 Five Nations
53	19 April 1999	Netherlands	91	3	Belluno	1999 European Championship
54	21 April 1999	France	0	19	Belluno	1999 European Championship
55	24 April 1999	Scotland	13	15	Belluno	1999 European Championship

== 2000 ==
Test	Date	Opponent	PF	PA	Venue	Event
56	9 January 2000	Spain	42	10	Barcelona	
57	6 February 2000	Spain	31	7	Banbury	2000 Five Nations
58	18 February 2000	France	24	8	Massy, Paris	2000 Five Nations
59	5 March 2000	Wales	51	0	Newbury	2000 Five Nations
60	1 April 2000	Scotland	64	9	Edinburgh	2000 Five Nations
61^{a}	8 May 2000	Kazakhstan	41	3	Vera	2000 European Championship
62^{a}	10 May 2000	France	12	19	Roquetas	2000 European Championship
63^{a}	13 May 2000	Scotland	40	20	Almería	2000 European Championship
64	23 September 2000	United States	31	7	Winnipeg	2000 Canada Cup
65	27 September 2000	Canada	34	10	Winnipeg	2000 Canada Cup
66	30 September 2000	New Zealand	13	32	Winnipeg	2000 Canada Cup

Notes

^a England only sent its development squad to the 2000 FIRA tournament.

== 2001 ==
Test	Date	Opponent	PF	PA	Venue	Event
67	4 February 2001	Wales	18	0	Newport	2001 Five Nations
68	18 February 2001	Spain	28	12	Worcester	2001 Five Nations
69	4 March 2001	Scotland	39	0	Richmond, London	2001 Five Nations
70	8 April 2001	France	50	6	Northampton	2001 Five Nations
71^{a}	6 May 2001	Kazakhstan	29	15	Tourcoing	2001 European Championship
72^{b}	10 May 2001	Spain	8	15	Lille	2001 European Championship
73^{a}	12 May 2001	France	34	23	Lille	2001 European Championship
74	26 May 2001	Australia	41	19	TG Millner Field, Sydney	
75	2 June 2001	Australia	15	5	Newcastle, New South Wales	
76	9 June 2001	New Zealand	10	15	Rotorua	
77	16 June 2001	New Zealand	22	17	North Harbour Stadium, Albany	

Notes

^b England only sent its development squad to the 2001 FIRA tournament.

== 2002 ==
Test	Date	Opponent	PF	PA	Venue	Event
78	3 February 2002	Scotland	35	8	Dunbar	2002 Six Nations
79	12 February 2002	Ireland	79	0	Worcester	2002 Six Nations
80	1 March 2002	France	17	22	Tournon, Lyon	2002 Six Nations
81	23 March 2002	Wales	40	0	London Welsh, London	2002 Six Nations
82	7 April 2002	Spain	53	14	Madrid	2002 Six Nations
83	13 May 2002	Italy	63	9	Cornellà de Llobregat, Barcelona	2002 Rugby World Cup
84	18 May 2001	Spain	13	5	Cornellà de Llobregat, Barcelona	2002 Rugby World Cup
85	21 May 2002	Canada	53	10	Gorina, Barcelona	2002 Rugby World Cup
86	25 May 2002	New Zealand	9	19	Estadi Olímpic Lluís Companys, Barcelona	2002 Rugby World Cup (silver)

== 2003 ==
Test	Date	Opponent	PF	PA	Venue	Event
87	15 February 2003	France	57	0	Twickenham Stadium, London	2003 Six Nations
88	21 February 2003	Wales	69	7	Cardiff Arms Park, Cardiff	2003 Six Nations
89	9 March 2003	Spain	69	0	Twickenham Stoop, London	2003 Six Nations
90	22 March 2003	Scotland	31	0	Twickenham Stoop, London	2003 Six Nations
91	28 March 2003	Ireland	46	3	Thomond Park, Limerick	2003 Six Nations
92	14 June 2003	Canada	10	5	Thunderbird Stadium, Vancouver	2003 Churchill Cup
93	18 June 2003	United States	15	8	Thunderbird Stadium, Vancouver	2003 Churchill Cup
94	28 June 2003	Canada	21	18	Thunderbird Stadium, Vancouver	2003 Churchill Cup

== 2004 ==
Test	Date	Opponent	PF	PA	Venue	Event
95	15 February 2004	Spain	71	3	Fénix Club, Zaragoza	2004 Six Nations
96	21 February 2004	Scotland	20	7	Netherdale, Galashiels	2004 Six Nations
97	6 March 2004	Ireland	51	10	Twickenham Stadium, London	2004 Six Nations
98	20 March 2004	Wales	53	3	Twickenham Stoop, London	2004 Six Nations
99	27 March 2003	France	12	13	Bourg-en-Bresse, Lyon	2004 Six Nations
100^{c}	2 May 2004	Italy	73	7	Toulouse	2004 European Championship
101^{c}	5 May 2004	Wales	39	3	Toulouse	2004 European Championship
102^{c}	8 May 2004	France	6	8	Toulouse	2004 European Championship
103	13 June 2004	Canada	35	11	Calgary Rugby Park, Calgary	2004 Churchill Cup
104	19 June 2004	New Zealand	0	38	Brick Field, Edmonton	2004 Churchill Cup
105	14 November 2004	Canada	45	5	Richmond, London	
106	17 November 2004	Canada	41	3	Newbury	

Notes

^c England only sent its development squad to the 2004 FIRA tournament.

== 2005 ==
Test	Date	Opponent	PF	PA	Venue	Event
107	4 February 2005	Wales	81	0	Cardiff Arms Park, Cardiff	2005 Six Nations
108	13 February 2005	France	10	13	Imber Court, London	2005 Six Nations
109	26 February 2005	Ireland	32	0	St Mary's College, Dublin	2005 Six Nations
110	12 March 2005	Spain	76	0	Imber Court, London	2005 Six Nations
111	19 March 2003	Scotland	22	10	Twickenham Stadium, London	2005 Six Nations
112	15 April 2005	South Africa	101	0	Imber Court, London	
113	15 October 2005	Samoa	53	0	Mount Smart Stadium, Auckland	
114	22 October 2005	New Zealand	15	24	Eden Park, Auckland	
115	26 October 2005	New Zealand	8	33	Waikato Stadium, Hamilton	

== 2006 ==
Test	Date	Opponent	PF	PA	Venue	Event
116	4 February 2006	Wales	38	15	Old Albanians, St Albans	2006 Six Nations
117	11 February 2006	Spain	86	3	Complutense, Madrid	2006 Six Nations
118	25 February 2006	Scotland	22	5	Murrayfield, Edinburgh	2006 Six Nations
119	11 March 2006	France	28	0	Bondoufle, Paris	2006 Six Nations
120	17 March 2006	Ireland	29	10	Old Albanians, St Albans	2006 Six Nations
121	31 August 2006	United States	18	0	Rugby Park, St. Albert	2006 Rugby World Cup
122	4 September 2006	South Africa	74	8	Ellerslie, Edmonton	2006 Rugby World Cup
123	8 September 2006	France	27	8	Rugby Park, St. Albert	2006 Rugby World Cup
124	12 September 2006	Canada	10	6	Ellerslie, Edmonton	2006 Rugby World Cup
125	17 September 2006	New Zealand	17	25	Commonwealth Stadium, Edmonton	2006 Rugby World Cup (silver)

== 2007 ==
Test	Date	Opponent	PF	PA	Venue	Event
126	3 February 2007	Scotland	60	0	Old Albanians, St Albans	2007 Six Nations
127	10 February 2007	Italy	23	0	Twickenham Stadium, London	2007 Six Nations
128	25 February 2007	Ireland	32	0	Thomond Park, Limerick	2007 Six Nations
129	11 March 2007	France	38	12	Old Albanians, St Albans	2007 Six Nations
130	17 March 2007	Wales	30	0	Taffs Well RFC, Taff's Well	2007 Six Nations
131^{d}	28 April 2007	Russia	62	0	Barcelona	2007 European Championship
132^{d}	30 April 2007	Italy	41	11	Barcelona	2007 European Championship
133^{d}	2 May 2007	Spain	22	22	Barcelona	2007 European Championship
134^{d}	5 May 2007	France	27	17	Barcelona	2007 European Championship
135	15 December 2007	United States	34	0	London Irish, London	

Notes

^d England only sent its development squad to the 2007 FIRA tournament.

== 2008 ==
Test	Date	Opponent	PF	PA	Venue	Event
136	2 February 2008	Wales	55	0	London Irish, London	2008 Six Nations
137	9 February 2008	Italy	76	6	Rome	2008 Six Nations
138	23 February 2008	France	31	0	Bergerac, Agen	2008 Six Nations
139	8 March 2008	Scotland	34	5	Meggetland Sports Complex, Edinburgh	2008 Six Nations
140	15 March 2008	Ireland	17	7	London Irish, London	2008 Six Nations
141	17 May 2008	Sweden	80	3	Amsterdam	2008 European Championship
142	20 May 2008	Ireland	22	11	Drachten	2008 European Championship
143	24 May 2008	Wales	12	6	Amsterdam	2008 European Championship
144	19 August 2008	United States	50	3	Molesey Road, Esher	
145	22 August 2008	United States	17	14	Molesey Road, Esher	2008 Nations Cup
146	24 August 2008	Canada	43	9	Molesey Road, Esher	2008 Nations Cup
147	29 August 2008	Canada	24	0	Molesey Road, Esher	2008 Nations Cup

== 2009 ==
Test	Date	Opponent	PF	PA	Venue	Event
148	7 February 2009	Italy	69	13	London Welsh, London	2009 Six Nations
149	14 February 2009	Wales	15	16	Taffs Well RFC, Taff's Well	2009 Six Nations
150	27 February 2009	Ireland	29	13	St Mary's RFC, Dublin	2009 Six Nations
151	15 March 2009	France	52	7	London Welsh, London	2009 Six Nations
152	21 March 2009	Scotland	72	3	London Welsh, London	2009 Six Nations
153	10 August 2009	United States	36	7	Oakville	2009 Nations Cup
154	13 August 2009	France	43	8	Oakville	2009 Nations Cup
155	19 August 2009	South Africa	25	0	Oakville	2009 Nations Cup
156	22 August 2009	Canada	22	0	Fletcher's Fields, Markham	
157	14 November 2009	New Zealand	3	16	Molesey Road, Esher	
158	21 November 2009	New Zealand	10	3	Twickenham Stadium, London	

== 2010 ==
Test	Date	Opponent	PF	PA	Venue	Event
159	6 February 2010	Wales	31	0	Molesey Road, Esher	2010 Six Nations
160	13 February 2010	Italy	41	0	Rugby Noceto,^{[it]}, Parma	2010 Six Nations
161	28 February 2010	Ireland	22	5	Molesey Road, Esher	2010 Six Nations
162	13 March 2010	Scotland	51	0	Meggetland Sports Complex, Edinburgh	2010 Six Nations
163	19 March 2010	France	11	10	Stade Rennais,^{[fr]}, Rennes	2010 Six Nations
164	20 August 2010	Ireland	27	0	Surrey Sports Park, Guildford	2010 Rugby World Cup
165	24 August 2010	Kazakhstan	82	0	Surrey Sports Park, Guildford	2010 Rugby World Cup
166	28 August 2010	United States	37	10	Surrey Sports Park, Guildford	2010 Rugby World Cup
167	1 September 2010	Australia	15	0	Twickenham Stoop, London	2010 Rugby World Cup
168	5 September 2010	New Zealand	10	13	Twickenham Stoop, London	2010 Rugby World Cup (silver)

== 2011 ==
Test	Date	Opponent	PF	PA	Venue	Event
169	6 February 2011	Wales	19	9	Cross Keys	2011 Six Nations
170	12 February 2011	Italy	68	5	Molesey Road, Esher	2011 Six Nations
171	27 February 2011	France	16	3	Sixways, Worcester	2011 Six Nations
172	13 March 2011	Scotland	89	0	Twickenham	2011 Six Nations
173	18 March 2011	Ireland	31	0	Ashbourne RFC, Meath	2011 Six Nations
174	2 August 2011	United States	15	11	Oakville, Ontario	2011 Nations Cup
175	5 August 2011	South Africa	46	8	Chatham-Kent, Ontario	2011 Nations Cup
176	9 August 2011	Canada	22	10	Oakville, Ontario	2011 Nations Cup
177	13 August 2011	Canada	41	19	Oakville, Ontario	2011 Nations Cup
178	5 November 2011	France	15	16	RC Châteaurenard, France	
179	26 November 2011	New Zealand	10	0	Twickenham, London	
180	29 November 2011	New Zealand	21	7	Molesey Road, Esher	
181	3 December 2011	New Zealand	8	8	Molesey Road, Esher	

== 2012 ==
Test	Date	Opponent	PF	PA	Venue	Event
182	5 February 2012	Scotland	47	0	Lasswade	2012 Six Nations
183	12 February 2012	Italy	43	3	Parabiago SSD,^{[it]} Milan	2012 Six Nations
184	25 February 2012	Wales	33	0	Twickenham	2012 Six Nations
185	11 March 2012	France	15	3	Stade Charléty, Paris	2012 Six Nations
186	17 March 2012	Ireland	23	6	Molesey Road, Esher	2012 Six Nations
187	13 May 2012	Spain	61	0	Rovereto	2012 FIRA Championship
188	16 May 2012	Italy	32	8	Rovereto	2012 FIRA Championship
189	19 May 2012	France	29	25	Rovereto	2012 FIRA Championship
190	3 November 2012	France	23	13	Molesey Road, Esher	End-of-year Test
191	23 November 2012	New Zealand	16	13	Molesey Road, Esher	End-of-year Test
192	27 November 2012	New Zealand	17	8	Aldershot Military Stadium	End-of-year Test
193	1 December 2012	New Zealand	32	23	Twickenham	End-of-year Test

== 2013 ==
Test	Date	Opponent	PF	PA	Venue	Event
194	2 February 2013	Scotland	76	0	Molesey Road, Esher	2013 Six Nations
195	9 February 2013	Ireland	0	25	Ashbourne RFC, Meath	2013 Six Nations
196	23 February 2013	France	20	30	Twickenham	2013 Six Nations
197	9 March 2013	Italy	34	0	Esher	2013 Six Nations
198	17 March 2013	Wales	20	16	Aberavon	2013 Six Nations
199	13 July 2013	New Zealand	10	29	Eden Park, Auckland	
200	16 July 2013	New Zealand	9	14	Waikato Stadium, Hamilton	
201	20 July 2013	New Zealand	8	29	ECOlight, Pukekohe	
202	30 July 2013	Canada	25	29	UNC, Greeley	2013 Nations Cup
203	4 August 2013	South Africa	18	17	UNC, Greeley	2013 Nations Cup
204	7 August 2013	United States	36	21	UNC, Greeley	2013 Nations Cup
205	10 August 2013	Canada	13	27	Infinity Park, Glendale	2013 Nations Cup
206	9 November 2013	France	40	20	Twickenham	
207	13 November 2013	Canada	32	3	Twickenham Stoop	

== 2014 ==
Test	Date	Opponent	PF	PA	Venue	Event
208	1 February 2014	France	6	18	Stade des Alpes, Grenoble	2014 Six Nations
209	9 February 2014	Scotland	63	0	Rubislaw, Aberdeen	2014 Six Nations
210	22 February 2014	Ireland	17	10	Twickenham	2014 Six Nations
211	7 March 2014	Wales	35	3	Twickenham Stoop	2014 Six Nations
212	16 March 2014	Italy	24	0	Rovato	2014 Six Nations
213	1 August 2014	Samoa	65	3	CNR, Marcoussis	2014 Rugby World Cup
214	5 August 2014	Spain	45	5	CNR, Marcoussis	2014 Rugby World Cup
215	9 August 2014	Canada	13	13	CNR, Marcoussis	2014 Rugby World Cup
216	13 August 2014	Ireland	40	7	Stade Jean-Bouin, Paris	2014 Rugby World Cup
217	17 August 2014	Canada	21	9	Stade Jean-Bouin, Paris	2014 Rugby World Cup (gold)

== 2015 ==
Test	Date	Opponent	PF	PA	Venue	Event
218	6 February 2015	Wales	0	13	St. Helen's, Swansea	2015 Six Nations
219	15 February 2015	Italy	39	7	Twickenham Stoop	2015 Six Nations
220	27 February 2015	Ireland	8	11	Ashbourne RFC, Meath	2015 Six Nations
221	13 March 2015	Scotland	42	13	Darlington, County Durham	2015 Six Nations
222	21 March 2015	France	39	7	Twickenham Stoop	2015 Six Nations
223	27 June 2015	United States	39	13	Calgary, Alberta	2015 Super Series
224	1 July 2015	New Zealand	7	26	Red Deer, Alberta	2015 Super Series
225	5 July 2015	Canada	15	14	Ellerslie, Edmonton	2015 Super Series
226	7 November 2015	France	0	11	Francis Turcan, Martigues	
227	14 November 2015	Ireland	8	3	Twickenham Stoop	

== 2016 ==
Test	Date	Opponent	PF	PA	Venue	Event
228	5 February 2016	Scotland	32	0	Broadwood, Cumbernauld	2016 Six Nations
229	13 February 2016	Italy	33	24	Gino Pistoni, Ivrea	2016 Six Nations
230	27 February 2016	Ireland	13	9	Twickenham, London	2016 Six Nations
231	12 March 2016	Wales	20	13	Twickenham Stoop	2016 Six Nations
232	18 March 2016	France	12	17	La Rabine, Vannes	2016 Six Nations
233	1 July 2016	Canada	17	52	Athletic Complex, Salt Lake	2016 Super Series
234	5 July 2016	France	17	13	Athletic Complex, Salt Lake	2016 Super Series
235	9 July 2016	United States	39	13	Athletic Complex, Salt Lake	2016 Super Series
236	9 November 2016	France	10	5	Twickenham Stoop	
237	13 November 2016	Ireland	12	10	UCD Bowl, Dublin, Ireland	
238	19 November 2016	New Zealand	20	25	Twickenham Stoop	
239	26 November 2016	Canada	39	6	Twickenham Stoop	

== 2017 ==
England played in the Six Nations and World Cup. The team also toured New Zealand and played international matches in the autumn.

Test	Date	Opponent	PF	PA	Venue	Event
240	4 February 2017	France	26	13	Twickenham, London	2017 Six Nations
241	11 February 2017	Wales	63	0	Cardiff Arms Park, Cardiff	2017 Six Nations
242	25 February 2017	Italy	29	15	Twickenham Stoop	2017 Six Nations
243	11 March 2017	Scotland	64	0	Twickenham Stoop	2017 Six Nations
244	17 March 2017	Ireland	34	7	Donnybrook, Dublin	2017 Six Nations
245	9 June 2017	Australia	53	10	Porirua Park, Wellington	
246	13 June 2017	Canada	27	20	Rugby Park, Christchurch	
247	17 June 2017	New Zealand	29	21	International Stadium, Rotorua	
248	9 August 2017	Spain	56	5	UCD Bowl, Dublin	2017 Rugby World Cup
249	13 August 2017	Italy	56	13	Billings Park UCD, Dublin	2017 Rugby World Cup
250	17 August 2017	United States	47	26	Billings Park UCD, Dublin	2017 Rugby World Cup
251	22 August 2017	France	20	3	Ravenhill Stadium, Belfast	2017 Rugby World Cup
252	26 August 2017	New Zealand	32	41	Ravenhill Stadium, Belfast	2017 Rugby World Cup (silver)
253	17 November 2017	Canada	79	5	Barnet Copthall, London	
254	21 November 2017	Canada	49	12	Twickenham Stoop	
255	25 November 2017	Canada	69	19	Twickenham	

== 2018 ==
England played in the Six Nations as well as international matches in autumn.

Test	Date	Opponent	PF	PA	Venue	Event
256	4 February 2018	Italy	42	7	Mirabello, Reggio Emilia	2018 Six Nations
257	10 February 2018	Wales	52	0	Twickenham Stoop	2018 Six Nations
258	23 February 2018	Scotland	43	8	Scotstoun, Glasgow	2018 Six Nations
259	10 March 2018	France	17	18	Stade des Alpes, Grenoble	2018 Six Nations
260	16 March 2018	Ireland	33	11	Ricoh Arena, Coventry	2018 Six Nations
261	9 November 2018	United States	57	5	Twickenham	
262	18 November 2018	Canada	27	19	Castle Park, Doncaster	
263	24 November 2018	Ireland	37	15	Twickenham	

== 2019 ==
England played in the Six Nations and Women's Rugby Super Series as well as international matches in autumn.

Test	Date	Opponent	PF	PA	Venue	Event
264	1 February 2019	Ireland	51	7	Donnybrook, Dublin	2019 Six Nations
265	10 February 2019	France	41	26	Castle Park, Doncaster	2019 Six Nations
266	24 February 2019	Wales	51	12	Cardiff Arms Park	2019 Six Nations
267	9 March 2019	Italy	55	0	Sandy Park, Exeter	2019 Six Nations
268	16 March 2019	Scotland	80	0	Twickenham	2019 Six Nations
269	28 June 2019	United States	38	5	Chula Vista, San Diego	2019 Super Series
270	6 July 2019	Canada	19	17	Chula Vista, San Diego	2019 Super Series
271	10 July 2019	France	20	18	Chula Vista, San Diego	2019 Super Series
272	14 July 2019	New Zealand	13	28	Torero Stadium, San Diego	2019 Super Series
273	9 November 2019	France	20	10	Stade Marcel-Michelin, Clermont Ferrand	
274	16 November 2019	France	17	15	Sandy Park, Exeter	
275	23 November 2019	Italy	60	3	Goldington Road, Bedford	

== 2020 ==
England played in the Six Nations.

Test	Date	Opponent	PF	PA	Venue	Event
276	2 February 2020	France	19	13	Stade du Hameau, Pau	2020 Six Nations
277	10 February 2020	Scotland	53	0	Murrayfield, Edinburgh	2020 Six Nations
278	23 February 2020	Ireland	27	0	Castle Park, Doncaster	2020 Six Nations
279	7 March 2020	Wales	66	7	Twickenham Stoop	2020 Six Nations
280	1 November 2020	Italy	54	0	Stadio Sergio Lanfranchi, Parma	2020 Six Nations
281	14 November 2020	France	33	10	Stade des Alpes, Grenoble	
282	21 November 2020	France	25	23	Twickenham	

== 2021 ==
England played in the Six Nations.

Test	Date	Opponent	PF	PA	Venue	Event
283	3 April 2021	Scotland	52	10	Castle Park, Doncaster	2021 Six Nations
284	10 April 2021	Italy	67	3	Stadio Sergio Lanfranchi, Parma	2021 Six Nations
285	21 April 2021	France	10	6	Twickenham Stoop	2021 Six Nations
286	30 April 2021	France	17	15 (Note: The match on 30 April 2021 was abandoned after 62 minutes of play, because of floodlight failure at the Stadium Lille Métropole. With sufficient time having elapsed under regulations, and England ahead on the scoreboard at the point of stoppage, they were declared the winners.)	Stadium Lille Métropole, Villeneuve-d'Ascq	
287	31 October 2021	New Zealand	43	12	Sandy Park, Exeter	
288	7 November 2021	New Zealand	56	15	Franklin's Gardens, Northampton	
289	14 November 2021	Canada	51	12	Twickenham Stoop	
290	21 November 2021	United States	89	0	Sixways Stadium, Worcester	

== 2022 ==
England played in the Six Nations and the World Cup.

Test	Date	Opponent	PF	PA	Venue	Event
291	26 March 2022	Scotland	57	5	Edinburgh Rugby Stadium	2022 Six Nations
292	3 April 2022	Italy	74	0	Stadio Sergio Lanfranchi, Parma	2022 Six Nations
293	9 April 2022	Wales	58	5	Kingsholm, Gloucester	2022 Six Nations
294	24 April 2022	Ireland	69	0	Welford Road, Leicester	2022 Six Nations
295	30 April 2022	France	24	12	Stade Jean Dauger, Bayonne	2022 Six Nations
296	3 September 2022	United States	52	14	Sandy Park, Exeter	2021 Rugby World Cup warm-ups
297	14 September 2022	Wales	73	7	Ashton Gate, Bristol	2021 Rugby World Cup warm-ups
298	8 October 2022	Fiji	84	19	Eden Park, Auckland	2021 Rugby World Cup
299	15 October 2022	France	13	7	Okara Park, Whangārei	2021 Rugby World Cup
300	22 October 2022	South Africa	75	0	The Trusts Arena, Auckland	2021 Rugby World Cup
301	30 October 2022	Australia	41	5	The Trusts Arena, Auckland	2021 Rugby World Cup
302	5 November 2022	Canada	26	19	Eden Park, Auckland	2021 Rugby World Cup
303	12 November 2022	New Zealand	31	34	Eden Park, Auckland	2021 Rugby World Cup (silver)

== 2023 ==
Test	Date	Opponent	PF	PA	Venue	Event
304	25 March 2023	Scotland	58	7	Kingston Park, Newcastle	2023 Six Nations
305	2 April 2023	Italy	68	5	Franklin's Gardens, Northampton	2023 Six Nations
306	15 April 2023	Wales	59	3	Cardiff Arms Park, Cardiff	2023 Six Nations
307	22 April 2023	Ireland	48	0	Musgrave Park, Cork	2023 Six Nations
308	29 April 2023	France	38	33	Twickenham Stadium, London	2023 Six Nations
309	23 September 2023	Canada	50	24	Sandy Park, Exeter	
310	30 September 2023	Canada	29	12	Barnet Copthall, London	
311	20 October 2023	Australia	42	7	Wellington Regional Stadium, Wellington	2023 WXV 1
312	27 October 2023	Canada	45	12	Forsyth Barr Stadium, Dunedin	2023 WXV 1
313	4 November 2023	New Zealand	33	12	Mount Smart Stadium, Auckland	2023 WXV 1

== 2024 ==
Test	Date	Opponent	PF	PA	Venue	Event
314	24 March 2024	Italy	48	0	Stadio Sergio Lanfranchi, Parma	2024 Six Nations
315	30 March 2024	Wales	46	10	Ashton Gate, Bristol	2024 Six Nations
316	13 April 2024	Scotland	46	0	Edinburgh Rugby Stadium, Edinburgh	2024 Six Nations
317	20 April 2024	Ireland	88	10	Twickenham Stadium, London	2024 Six Nations
318	27 April 2024	France	42	21	Stade Chaban-Delmas, Bordeaux	2024 Six Nations
319	7 September 2024	France	38	19	Kingsholm Stadium, Gloucester	
320	14 September 2024	New Zealand	24	12	Twickenham Stadium, London	
321	29 September 2024	United States	61	21	BC Place, Vancouver	2024 WXV 1
322	6 October 2024	New Zealand	49	31	Langley Events Centre, Langley	2024 WXV 1
323	12 October 2024	Canada	21	12	BC Place, Vancouver	2024 WXV 1

== 2025 ==
Test	Date	Opponent	PF	PA	Venue	Event
324	23 March 2025	Italy	38	5	York Community Stadium, York	2025 Six Nations
325	29 March 2025	Wales	67	12	Millennium Stadium, Cardiff	2025 Six Nations
326	12 April 2025	Ireland	49	5	Musgrave Park, Cork	2025 Six Nations
327	19 April 2025	Scotland	59	7	Welford Road, Leicester	2025 Six Nations
328	26 April 2025	France	43	42	Twickenham Stadium, London	2025 Six Nations
329	2 August 2025	Spain	97	7	Welford Road, Leicester	2025 Rugby World Cup warm-ups
330	9 August 2025	France	40	6	Stade Guy Boniface, Mont-de-Marsan	2025 Rugby World Cup warm-ups
331	22 August 2025	United States	69	7	Stadium of Light, Sunderland	2025 Rugby World Cup
332	30 August 2025	Samoa	92	3	Franklin's Gardens, Northampton	2025 Rugby World Cup
333	6 September 2025	Australia	47	7	Brighton & Hove Albion Stadium, Brighton	2025 Rugby World Cup
334	14 September 2025	Scotland	40	8	Ashton Gate, Bristol	2025 Rugby World Cup
335	20 September 2025	France	35	17	Ashton Gate, Bristol	2025 Rugby World Cup
336	27 September 2025	Canada	33	13	Twickenham Stadium, London	2025 Rugby World Cup (gold)

== 2026 ==
Test	Date	Opponent	PF	PA	Venue	Event
337	11 April 2026	Ireland	33	12	Twickenham Stadium, London	2026 Six Nations
338	18 April 2026	Scotland	84	7	Murrayfield, Edinburgh	2026 Six Nations
339	25 April 2026	Wales	62	24	Ashton Gate, Bristol	2026 Six Nations
340	9 May 2026	Italy	61	33	Stadio Sergio Lanfranchi, Parma	2026 Six Nations
341	17 May 2026	France	43	28	Stade Atlantique, Bordeaux	2026 Six Nations
342	12 September 2026	Australia	48	15	CorpAcq Stadium, Salford	2026 WXV
343	19 September 2026	Canada	26	26	Sandy Park, Exeter	2026 WXV
344	26 September 2026	New Zealand	26	19	Twickenham Stadium, London	2026 WXV
345	16 October 2026	Canada	21	24	BMO Field, Toronto	2026 WXV
346	23 October 2026	Canada			TD Place Stadium, Ottawa	2026 WXV
347	30 October 2026	United States			Sports Illustrated Stadium, Newark	2026 WXV

== 2027 ==
Test	Date	Opponent	PF	PA	Venue	Event
348	10 April 2027	Wales			Millennium Stadium, Cardiff	2027 Six Nations
349	17 April 2027	Scotland				2027 Six Nations
350	24 April 2027	Italy			Franklin's Gardens, Northampton	2027 Six Nations
351	8 May 2027	Ireland				2027 Six Nations
352	15 May 2027	France			Twickenham Stadium, London	2027 Six Nations

== Other matches ==
=== 2000s ===
Date	England	PF	PA	Opponent	Venue
2002-01-19	England A	10	5	Spain	Cornella
2002-02-16	England A	53	0	Wales A	Bridgend
2002-03-02	England Academy	5	0	Netherlands	Staines
2002-03-24	England A	79	0	Wales A	London Welsh
2002-04-14	England Academy	35	0	Wales A	Chester
2003-02-01	England A	34	0	Spain	Cornella
2003-03-23	England Academy	12	22	Wales A	Caerphilly
2003-03-29	England Development	14	15	Netherlands	Amsterdam
2004-01-31	England A	35	5	Spain	Imber Court
2004-02-22	England Development	15	5	Netherlands	Newbury, England
2004-03-27	England A	32	14	France A	Bourg-en-Bresse, France
2004-04-25	England Academy	80	0	Wales A	Broadstreet, Coventry
2004-12-08	England A	50	17	Wales	Clifton, England
2005-01-09	England Academy	19	25	Ireland	St Mary's RFC, Dublin
2005-02-06	England Academy	36	19	Netherlands	Amsterdam
2005-02-12	England A	29	6	France A	Imber Court
2005-03-20	England Academy	48	0	Wales A	Birchgrove, Wales
2005-05-07	England A	42	12	South Africa	Old Albanians, St Albans
2005-05-10	England Academy	25	19	South Africa	Old Albanians, St Albans
2006-01-29	England A	8	21	United States	Imber Court
2006-02-12	England A	17	10	Italy	Imber Court
2006-02-26	England Students	0	13	Netherlands	RAF Halton, England
2006-04-14	England Select XV	35	5	Sweden	RAF Halton
2006-04-16	England Students	15	10	Sweden	RAF Halton
2007-03-11	England A	21	7	France A	Old Albanians, St Albans
2008-02-09	England A	22	5	Spain	Madrid
2008-02-23	England A	3	0	France A	Bergerac, Agen
2008-12-12	England Development	20	10	Italy A	London Welsh
2008-12-14	England A	20	0	Italy	Old Deer Park
2008-12-20	England	19	8	Ireland President's XV	St Mary's RFC, Dublin
2009-02-07	England A	29	0	Spain	London Welsh
2009-02-28	England A	7	14	Nomads	Esher
2009-03-15	England A	38	5	France A	London Welsh
2009-03-21	England A	15	17	Nomads	London Welsh
2009-11-17	England A	3	48	New Zealand	Esher

=== 2010s ===
Date	England	PF	PA	Opponent	Venue	Tournament
2010-02-07	England A	12	10	Nomads	Esher	
2010-02-14	England A	10	5	Spain	Gijón	
2010-03-13	England A	26	7	Nomads	Esher	
2010-03-19	England A	0	20	France A	Rennes	
2011-02-23	England A	19	22	Nomads	Esher	
2011-03-19	England A	34	7	Spain	Guildford	
2011-04-30	England A	5	0	Italy A	University of A Coruña	2011 FIRA Trophy
2011-05-02	England A	36	0	Netherlands	INEF Bastiaqueiro	2011 FIRA Trophy
2011-05-04	England A	39	0	Russia	Fotecarmoa, Vilagarcía	2011 FIRA Trophy
2011-05-07	England A	5	3	Spain	University of Coruña	2011 FIRA Trophy
2011-11-02	England XV	5	14	France XV	Stade Jean-Bouin, Marseille	
2014-07-02	England	48	0	United States	Surrey Sports Park	
2015-12-01	England A	37	29	Canada A	Molesey Road, Hersham, Surrey	
2015-12-05	England A	22	19	Canada A	Molesey Road, Hersham, Surrey	
2017-07-22	England A	7	15	Spain XV	Brunel University London	
2019-06-02	England	40	14	Barbarians	Twickenham	
