= History of women's rugby union matches between England and France =

England women and France women first participated against each other in 1991 in the inaugural Women's Rugby World Cup. They have since been the most decorated rivalry with 55 test matches have been contested. Of these, 41 have been won by England and 14 by France. Since 1996, they have contested a game annually, and since 1999, this has been contested in the Women's Six Nations Championship.

== Summary ==
=== Overall ===
Details	Played	Won by England	Won by France	Drawn	England points	France points
In England	22	18	4	0	627	348
In France	25	17	8	0	509	306
Neutral venue	12	10	2	0	237	143
Overall	59	45	14	0	1,377	784

=== Record ===
Note: Date shown in brackets indicates when the record was or last set.

Record	England	France
Longest winning streak	17 (10 Feb 2019–Present)	4 (1 Feb 2014–5 Jul 2016)
Largest points for
Home	57 (15 February 2003)	28 (17 May 2026)
Away	43 (17 May 2026)	42 (26 April 2025)
Neutral venue	43 (13 August 2009)	25 (19 May 2012)
Largest winning margin
Home	57 (15 February 2003)	12 (1 February 2014)
Away	34 (9 August 2025)	10 (23 February 2013)
Neutral venue	35 (13 August 2009)	19 (21 April 1999)

== Results ==
No.	Date	Venue	Score	Winner	Competition
1	12 April 1991	Cardiff Arms Park, Cardiff, Wales	13 – 0	England	1991 Women's Rugby World Cup semi-final
2	18 February 1994	Wolverhampton	32 – 8	England	
3	20 April 1994	Gala, Scotland	18 – 6	England	1994 Women's Rugby World Cup semi-final
4	18 February 1996	Villard-Bonnot	6 – 15	England	
5	23 February 1997	Northampton	15 – 17	France	
6	4 April 1997	Nice	10 – 15	England	1997 European Championship semi-final
7	1 February 1998	Villeneuve-d'Ascq, Lille	5 – 13	England	
8	21 March 1999	Worcester	13 – 8	England	1999 Women's Five Nations Championship
9	21 April 1999	Belluno, Italy	0 – 19	France	1999 European Championship semi-final
10	18 February 2000	Massy, Paris	8 – 24	England	2000 Women's Five Nations Championship
11	10 May 2000	Roquetas, Spain	12 – 19	France	2000 European Championship semi-final
12	8 April 2001	Northampton	50 – 6	England	2001 Women's Five Nations Championship
13	5 May 2001	Stadium Nord, Lille	23 – 34	England	2001 European Championship third place play-off
14	1 March 2002	Tournon, Lyon	22 – 17	France	2002 Women's Six Nations Championship
15	15 February 2003	Twickenham Stadium, London	57 – 0	England	2003 Women's Six Nations Championship
16	27 March 2004	Bourg-en-Bresse, Lyon	13 – 12	France	2004 Women's Six Nations Championship
17	8 May 2004	Stade des Minimes, Toulouse	8 – 6	France	2004 European Championship final
18	13 February 2005	Imber Court, London	10 – 13	France	2005 Women's Six Nations Championship
19	11 March 2006	Bondoufle, Paris	0 – 28	England	2006 Women's Six Nations Championship
20	8 September 2006	St. Albert Rugby Park, St. Albert, Canada	27 – 8	England	2006 Women's Rugby Cup pool stage
21	11 March 2007	Old Albanians, St. Albans	38 – 12	England	2007 Women's Six Nations Championship
22	5 May 2007	Madrid, Spain	27 – 17	England	2007 European Championship final
23	23 February 2008	Bergerac, Agen	0 – 31	England	2008 Women's Six Nations Championship
24	15 March 2009	Old Deer Park, London	52 – 7	England	2009 Women's Six Nations Championship
25	13 August 2009	Appleby College, Oakville, Canada	43 – 8	England	2009 Nations Cup
26	19 March 2010	Stade Commandant Bougouin, Rennes	10 – 11	England	2010 Women's Six Nations Championship
27	27 February 2011	Sixways Stadium, Worcester	16 – 3	England	2011 Women's Six Nations Championship
28	5 November 2011	Stade Pierre de Coubertin, Châteaurenard	16 – 15	France	2011 Autumn International
29	11 March 2012	Stade Charléty, Paris	3 – 15	England	2012 Women's Six Nations Championship
30	19 May 2012	Rovereto, Italy	29 – 25	England	2012 European Championship
31	3 November 2012	Molesey Road, Esher	23 – 13	England	2012 Autumn International
32	23 February 2013	Twickenham Stadium, London	20 – 30	France	2013 Women's Six Nations Championship
33	9 November 2013	Twickenham Stadium, London	40 – 20	England	2013 Autumn International
34	1 February 2014	Stade des Alpes, Grenoble	18 – 6	France	2014 Women's Six Nations Championship
35	21 March 2015	Twickenham Stadium, London	16 – 21	France	2015 Women's Six Nations Championship
36	7 November 2015	Stade Francis Turcan, Martigues	11 – 0	France	2015 Autumn International
37	18 March 2016	Stade de la Rabine, Vannes	17 – 12	France	2016 Women's Six Nations Championship
38	5 July 2016	Regional Athletic Complex, Salt Lake City, United States	10 – 5	England	2016 Women's Rugby Super Series
39	9 November 2016	Twickenham Stoop, London	17 – 13	England	2016 Autumn International
40	12 February 2017	Twickenham Stadium, London	26 – 13	England	2017 Women's Six Nations Championship
41	22 August 2017	Kingspan Stadium, Belfast, Ireland	20 – 3	England	2017 Women's Rugby World Cup semi-final
42	10 March 2018	Stade des Alpes, Grenoble,	18 – 17	France	2018 Women's Six Nations Championship
43	10 February 2019	Castle Park, Doncaster	41 – 26	England	2019 Women's Six Nations Championship
44	10 July 2019	Chula Vista, San Diego, United States	20 – 18	England	2019 Women's Rugby Super Series
45	9 November 2019	Stade Marcel Michelin, Clermont Ferrand	10 – 20	England	2019 Autumn International
46	16 November 2019	Sandy Park, Exeter	17 – 15	England	2019 Autumn International
47	2 February 2020	Stade du Hameau, Pau	13 – 19	England	2020 Women's Six Nations Championship
48	14 November 2020	Stade des Alpes, Grenoble	10 – 33	England	2020 Autumn International
49	21 November 2020	Twickenham Stadium, London	25 – 23	England	2020 Autumn International
50	24 April 2021	Twickenham Stoop, London	10 – 6	England	2021 Women's Six Nations Championship
51	30 April 2021	Stadium Lille Métropole, Villeneuve-d'Ascq, Lille	15 – 17 (Note: The match on 30 April 2021 was abandoned after 62 minutes of play, because of floodlight failure at the Stadium Lille Métropole. With sufficient time having elapsed under regulations, and England ahead on the scoreboard at the point of stoppage, they were declared the winners.)	England	
52	30 April 2022	Stade Jean-Dauger, Bayonne	12 – 24	England	2022 Women's Six Nations Championship
53	15 October 2022	Okara Park, Whangārei, New Zealand	13 – 7	England	2021 Women's Rugby World Cup pool stage
54	29 April 2023	Twickenham Stadium, London	38 – 33	England	2023 Women's Six Nations Championship
55	27 April 2024	Stade Chaban-Delmas, Bordeaux	21 – 42	England	2024 Women's Six Nations Championship
56	26 April 2025	Twickenham Stadium, London	43 – 42	England	2025 Women's Six Nations Championship
57	9 August 2025	Stade André et Guy Boniface, Mont-de-Marsan	6 – 40	England	2025 Women's Rugby World Cup warm-up match
58	20 September 2025	Ashton Gate, Bristol	35 – 17	England	2025 Women's Rugby World Cup semi-final
59	17 May 2026	Stade Atlantique, Bordeaux	28 – 43	England	2026 Women's Six Nations Championship
