= List of Ireland women's national rugby union team matches =

The following is a list of Ireland women's national rugby union team matches

== Overall ==
Ireland's overall international match record against all nations, updated to 14 September 2025, is as follows:

	Games Played	Won	Drawn	Lost	Win %
Total	217	89	1	127	41.01%

== Legend ==
Won	Lost	Draw

== 1990s ==
=== 1993 ===
Test	Date	Opponent	PF	PA	Venue
1	1993-02-14	Scotland	0	10	Raeburn Place, Edinburgh

=== 1994 ===
Test	Date	Opponent	PF	PA	Venue	Tournament
2	13 February 1994	Scotland	0	5	Ravenhill, Belfast	
?	6 March 1994	Wales	3	20	Stradbrook Park, Dublin (not capped?)	
?	13 April 1994	Scottish Students	18	5	West of Scotland RFC (not capped)	1994 Rugby World Cup*
3	15 April 1994	France	0	31	West of Scotland RFC	1994 Rugby World Cup
4	17 April 1994	United States	0	76	Boroughmuir	1994 Rugby World Cup
5	20 April 1994	Scotland	3	10	Melrose	1994 Rugby World Cup
6	23 April 1994	Japan	11	3	Boroughmuir	1994 Rugby World Cup

- Scottish Students were a last minute replacement for Spain, who dropped out of the 1994 World Cup.

=== 1995 ===
Test	Date	Opponent	PF	PA	Venue
7	20 February 1995	Scotland	3	20	Myreside, Edinburgh
8	5 March 1995	France	10	39	Dublin

=== 1996 ===
Test	Date	Opponent	PF	PA	Venue	Tournament
9	21 January 1996	Scotland	0	21	Blackrock	1996 Home Nations Championship
10	3 March 1996	Wales	22	6	Old Belvedere R.F.C., Dublin	1996 Home Nations Championship
11	17 March 1996	England	8	12	Sunbury	1996 Home Nations Championship

=== 1997 ===
Test	Date	Opponent	PF	PA	Venue	Tournament
12	26 January 1997	Wales	5	32	Bridgend	1997 Home Nations Championship
13	9 February 1997	England	0	32	Limerick	1997 Home Nations Championship
14	23 February 1997	Scotland	3	28	Pennypit, Edinburgh	1997 Home Nations Championship
15	2 April 1997	Spain	0	27	Nice, France	1997 FIRA Championship
16	4 April 1997	Italy	5	13	Nice, France	1997 FIRA Championship
17	6 April 1997	Germany	16	0	Nice, France	1997 FIRA Championship
18	9 November 1997	Germany	32	6	Hamburg	

=== 1998 ===
Test	Date	Opponent	PF	PA	Venue	Tournament
19	8 February 1998	Scotland	0	15	Old Belvedere, Dublin	1998 Home Nations Championship
20	22 March 1998	Wales	10	27	Old Crescent RFC, Rosbrien	1998 Home Nations Championship
21	5 April 1998	England	8	62	Worcester	1998 Home Nations Championship
22	2 May 1998	Australia	0	21	Amsterdam	1998 Rugby World Cup
23	5 May 1998	Kazakhstan	6	12	Amsterdam	1998 Rugby World Cup
24	9 May 1998	Netherlands	21	18	Amsterdam	1998 Rugby World Cup
25	12 May 1998	Italy	20	5	Amsterdam	1998 Rugby World Cup
26	15 May 1998	Kazakhstan	10	26	Amsterdam	1998 Rugby World Cup

=== 1999 ===
Test	Date	Opponent	PF	PA	Venue	Tournament
27	7 February 1999	France	0	24	Dublin	1999 Five Nations
28	21 February 1999	Wales	0	26	Stradey Park	1999 Five Nations
29	7 March 1999	England	0	56	Dublin	1999 Five Nations
30	21 March 1999	Scotland	5	22	Inverleith, Edinburgh	1999 Five Nations

== 2000s ==
=== 2000 ===
Test	Date	Opponent	PF	PA	Venue	Tournament
31	8 May 2000	France	14	41	El Ejido, Spain	2000 FIRA Championship
32	10 May 2000	Kazakhstan	15	31	Vera, Spain	2000 FIRA Championship
33	13 May 2000	Netherlands	19	12	El Ejido, Spain	2000 FIRA Championship

=== 2001 ===
Test	Date	Opponent	PF	PA	Venue	Tournament
34	9 February 2001	Spain	0	42	Madrid	
35	16 February 2001	France	0	53	Dublin	
36	6 May 2001	France	9	45	Marquette-lez-Lille, France	2001 FIRA Championship
37	10 May 2001	Wales	10	15	Lille, France	2001 FIRA Championship
38	12 May 2001	Italy	9	8	Lille, France	2001 FIRA Championship
39	24 October 2001	Netherlands	15	0	Amsterdam	

=== 2002 ===
Test	Date	Opponent	PF	PA	Venue	Tournament
40	3 February 2002	Wales	5	13	Thormond Park, Limerick	2002 Six Nations
41	17 February 2002	England	0	79	Worcester	2002 Six Nations
42	2 March 2002	Scotland	0	13	Limerick	2002 Six Nations
43	25 March 2002	Spain	6	8	Limerick	2002 Six Nations
44	5 April 2002	France	0	46	Melun	2002 Six Nations
45	13 May 2002	Canada	0	57	Barcelona	2002 Rugby World Cup
46	17 May 2002	Samoa	0	22	Barcelona	2002 Rugby World Cup
47	20 May 2002	Germany	18	0	Barcelona	2002 Rugby World Cup
48	24 May 2002	Japan	0	18	Barcelona	2002 Rugby World Cup

=== 2003 ===
Test	Date	Opponent	PF	PA	Venue	Tournament
49	15 February 2003	Scotland	0	25	Netherdale (Gala)	2003 Six Nations
50	22 February 2003	Spain	16	0	Madrid	2003 Six Nations
51	9 March 2003	France	0	20	Limerick	2003 Six Nations
52	21 March 2003	Wales	0	17	Cardiff Arms Park	2003 Six Nations
53	28 March 2003	England	3	46	Thomond Park, Limerick	2003 Six Nations

=== 2004 ===
Test	Date	Opponent	PF	PA	Venue	Tournament
54	15 February 2004	France	5	22	Savigny-sur-Orge, Paris	2004 Six Nations
55	21 February 2004	Wales	13	14	Thomond Park, Limerick	2004 Six Nations
56	6 March 2004	England	10	51	Twickenham, London	2004 Six Nations
57	20 March 2004	Spain	7	8	Thomond Park, Limerick	2004 Six Nations
58	27 March 2004	Scotland	0	17	Thomond Park, Limerick	2004 Six Nations
59	1 May 2004	Wales	7	24	Toulouse, France	2004 FIRA Championship
60	5 May 2004	Italy	14	5	Toulouse, France	2004 FIRA Championship
61	8 May 2004	Spain	20	12	Toulouse, France	2004 FIRA Championship
62	14 November 2004	Japan	55	0	Donnybrook, Dublin	

=== 2005 ===
Test	Date	Opponent	PF	PA	Venue	Tournament
63	5 February 2005	Spain	17	19	Campo Central Ciudad Universitaria, Madrid	2005 Six Nations
64	12 February 2005	Scotland	5	15	Murrayfield	2005 Six Nations
65	26 February 2005	England	0	32	St Mary's College, Dublin	2005 Six Nations
66	13 March 2005	France	0	34	Dublin	2005 Six Nations
67	18 March 2005	Wales	11	6	Cardiff Arms Park	2005 Six Nations

=== 2006 ===
Test	Date	Opponent	PF	PA	Venue	Tournament
68	25 January 2006	United States	5	23	Thomond Park	
69	4 February 2006	Spain	25	10	Donnybrook, Dublin	2006 Six Nations
70	10 February 2006	France	0	32	Montauban, Toulouse	2006 Six Nations
71	25 February 2006	Wales	7	14	Donnybrook, Dublin	2006 Six Nations
72	10 March 2006	Scotland	0	9	Navan	2006 Six Nations
73	17 March 2006	England	10	29	Old Albanians, St Albans	2006 Six Nations
74	29 April 2006	Canada	15	8	Galway	
75	31 August 2006	France	0	43	St. Albert Rugby Park, St. Albert	2006 Rugby World Cup
76	4 September 2006	United States	11	24	Ellerslie Rugby Park, Edmonton	2006 Rugby World Cup
77	8 September 2006	South Africa	37	0	St. Albert Rugby Park, St. Albert	2006 Rugby World Cup
78	12 September 2006	Scotland	10	11	St. Albert Rugby Park, St. Albert	2006 Rugby World Cup
79	16 September 2006	Australia	14	18	Ellerslie Rugby Park, Edmonton	2006 Rugby World Cup

=== 2007 ===
Test	Date	Opponent	PF	PA	Venue	Tournament
80	3 February 2007	Wales	5	10	Taffs Well RFC, Cardiff	2007 Six Nations
81	10 February 2007	France	10	13	St Mary's RFC, Dublin	2007 Six Nations
82	25 February 2007	England	0	32	Thomond Park, Limerick	2007 Six Nations
83	10 March 2007	Scotland	18	6	Meggetland, Edinburgh	2007 Six Nations
84	17 March 2007	Italy	17	12	Tre Fontane, Rome	2007 Six Nations

=== 2008 ===
Test	Date	Opponent	PF	PA	Venue	Tournament
85	1 February 2008	Italy	19	0	St Mary's RFC, Dublin	2008 Six Nations
86	10 February 2008	France	17	26	St Gratien	2008 Six Nations
87	22 February 2008	Scotland	13	3	St Mary's RFC, Dublin	2008 Six Nations
88	7 March 2008	Wales	10	19	St Mary's RFC, Dublin	2008 Six Nations
89	15 March 2008	England	7	17	London Irish	2008 Six Nations
90	17 May 2008	Spain	41	7	Amsterdam	2008 FIRA Championship
91	20 May 2008	England	11	22	Drachten, Netherlands	2008 FIRA Championship
92	24 May 2008	France	22	22	Amsterdam	2008 FIRA Championship

=== 2009 ===
Test	Date	Opponent	PF	PA	Venue	Tournament
93	6 February 2009	France	7	5	Ashbourne	2009 Six Nations
94	14 February 2009	Italy	35	17	Stadio M.Natali, Colleferro	2009 Six Nations
95	27 February 2009	England	29	13	St Mary's RFC, Dublin	2009 Six Nations
96	13 March 2009	Scotland	23	0	Meggetland	2009 Six Nations
97	21 March 2009	Wales	10	13	Taffs Well	2009 Six Nations

== 2010s ==
=== 2010 ===
Test	Date	Opponent	PF	PA	Venue	Tournament
98	5 February 2010	Italy	22	5	Ashbourne, County Meath, Leinster	2010 Six Nations
99	12 February 2010	France	9	19	Stade des Allées, Blois, Loir-et-Cher	2010 Six Nations
100	28 February 2010	England	5	22	Pillar Data Arena, Esher, Surrey	2010 Six Nations
101	12 March 2010	Wales	18	3	Ashbourne, County Meath, Leinster	2010 Six Nations
102	19 March 2010	Scotland	15	3	Ashbourne, County Meath, Leinster	2010 Six Nations
103	20 August 2010	England	0	27	Surrey Sports Park, Guildford	2010 Rugby World Cup
104	24 August 2010	United States	22	12	Surrey Sports Park, Guildford	2010 Rugby World Cup
105	28 August 2010	Kazakhstan	37	3	Surrey Sports Park, Guildford	2010 Rugby World Cup
106	1 September 2010	United States	3	40	Surrey Sports Park, Guildford	2010 Rugby World Cup
107	5 September 2010	Scotland	32	8	Surrey Sports Park, Guildford	2010 Rugby World Cup

=== 2011 ===
Test	Date	Opponent	PF	PA	Venue	Tournament
108	6 February 2011	Italy	26	5	Rovigo	2011 Six Nations
109	11 February 2011	France	12	14	Ashbourne	2011 Six Nations
110	26 February 2011	Scotland	22	5	Lasswade	2011 Six Nations
111	13 March 2011	Wales	14	15	Cross Keys RFC	2011 Six Nations
112	18 March 2011	England	0	31	Ashbourne	2011 Six Nations

=== 2012 ===
Test	Date	Opponent	PF	PA	Venue	Tournament
113	3 February 2012	Wales	10	3	Ashbourne RFC	2012 Six Nations
114	11 February 2012	France	7	8	Stade du Hameau, Pau	2012 Six Nations
115	24 February 2012	Italy	40	10	Ashbourne RFC	2012 Six Nations
116	3 March 2012	Wales	36	0	Ashbourne RFC	2012 Six Nations
117	9 March 2012	Scotland	20	0	Ashbourne RFC	2012 Six Nations
118	17 March 2012	England	6	23	Esher RFC	2012 Six Nations

=== 2013 ===
Test	Date	Opponent	PF	PA	Venue	Tournament
119	3 February 2013	Wales	12	10	Aberavon	2013 Six Nations
120	9 February 2013	England	25	0	Ashbourne	2013 Six Nations
121	23 February 2013	Scotland	30	3	Lasswade	2013 Six Nations
122	8 March 2013	France	15	10	Ashbourne	2013 Six Nations
123	17 March 2013	Italy	6	3	Parabiago, Milan	2013 Six Nations

=== 2014 ===
Test	Date	Opponent	PF	PA	Venue	Tournament
124	31 January 2014	Scotland	59	0	Ashbourne	2014 Six Nations
125	7 February 2014	Wales	18	6	Ashbourne	2014 Six Nations
126	22 February 2014	England	10	17	Twickenham	2014 Six Nations
127	8 March 2014	Italy	39	0	Aviva Stadium, Dublin	2014 Six Nations
128	14 March 2014	France	15	19	Stade du Hameau, Pau	2014 Six Nations
129	1 August 2014	United States	23	17	CNR, Marcoussis Pitch 2	2014 Rugby World Cup
130	5 August 2014	New Zealand	17	14	CNR, Marcoussis Pitch 1	2014 Rugby World Cup
131	9 August 2014	Kazakhstan	40	5	CNR, Marcoussis Pitch 2	2014 Rugby World Cup
132	13 August 2014	England	7	40	Stade Jean-Bouin, Paris	2014 Rugby World Cup
133	17 August 2014	France	18	25	Stade Jean-Bouin, Paris	2014 Rugby World Cup

=== 2015 ===
Test	Date	Opponent	PF	PA	Venue	Tournament
134	6 February 2015	Italy	30	5	Florence	2015 Six Nations
135	13 February 2015	France	5	10	Ashbourne	2015 Six Nations
136	27 February 2015	England	11	8	Ashbourne	2015 Six Nations
137	15 March 2015	Wales	20	0	Swansea	2015 Six Nations
138	22 March 2015	Scotland	73	3	Cumbernauld	2015 Six Nations
139	14 November 2015	England	3	8	Twickenham Stoop	

=== 2016 ===
Test	Date	Opponent	PF	PA	Venue	Tournament
140	6 February 2016	Wales	21	3	Donnybrook Stadium, Dublin	2016 Six Nations
141	13 February 2016	France	6	18	Stade Aimé Giral, Perpignan	2016 Six Nations
142	27 February 2016	England	9	13	Twickenham Stadium, London	2016 Six Nations
143	13 March 2016	Italy	14	3	Donnybrook Stadium, Dublin	2016 Six Nations
144	20 March 2016	Scotland	45	12	Donnybrook Stadium, Dublin	2016 Six Nations
145	13 November 2016	England	10	12	UCD Bowl, Dublin, Ireland	
146	19 November 2016	Canada	7	48	UCD Bowl, Dublin, Ireland	
147	27 November 2016	New Zealand	8	38	UCD Bowl, Dublin, Ireland	

=== 2017 ===
Test	Date	Opponent	PF	PA	Venue	Tournament
148	3 February 2017	Scotland	22	15	Broadwood, Cumbernauld	2017 Six Nations
149	12 February 2017	Italy	27	3	Stadio Tommaso Fattori, L'Aquila	2017 Six Nations
150	26 February 2017	France	13	10	Donnybrook, Dublin	2017 Six Nations
151	11 March 2017	Wales	12	7	Cardiff Arms Park	2017 Six Nations
152	17 March 2017	England	7	34	Donnybrook, Dublin	2017 Six Nations
153	9 August 2017	Australia	19	17	UCD Bowl, Dublin	2017 Rugby World Cup
154	13 August 2017	Japan	24	14	UCD Bowl, Dublin	2017 Rugby World Cup
155	17 August 2017	France	5	21	UCD Bowl, Dublin	2017 Rugby World Cup
156	22 August 2017	Australia	24	36	Kingspan Stadium, Belfast	2017 Rugby World Cup
157	26 August 2017	Wales	17	27	Kingspan Stadium, Belfast	2017 Rugby World Cup

=== 2018 ===
Test	Date	Opponent	PF	PA	Venue	Tournament
158	3 February 2018	France	0	24	Stade Ernest-Wallon, Toulouse	2018 Six Nations
159	11 February 2018	Italy	21	8	Donnybrook, Dublin	2018 Six Nations
160	25 February 2018	Wales	35	12	Donnybrook, Dublin	2018 Six Nations
161	11 March 2018	Scotland	12	15	Donnybrook, Dublin	2018 Six Nations
162	16 March 2018	England	11	33	Ricoh Arena, Coventry	2018 Six Nations
163	18 November 2018	United States	10	19	Donnybrook, Dublin	
164	24 November 2018	England	15	37	Twickenham, London	

=== 2019 ===
Test	Date	Opponent	PF	PA	Venue	Tournament
165	1 February 2019	England	7	51	Donnybrook, Dublin	2019 Six Nations
166	8 February 2019	Scotland	22	5	Scotsoun, Glasgow	2019 Six Nations
167	23 February 2019	Italy	27	29	Stadio Sergio Lanfranchi, Parma	2019 Six Nations
168	9 March 2019	France	17	47	Donnybrook, Dublin	2019 Six Nations
169	17 March 2019	Wales	5	24	Cardiff Arms Park	2019 Six Nations
170	10 November 2019	Wales	13	15	Donnybrook, Dublin	

== 2020s ==
=== 2020 ===
Test	Date	Opponent	PF	PA	Venue	Tournament
171	2 February 2020	Scotland	18	14	Donnybrook, Dublin	2020 Six Nations
172	9 February 2020	Wales	31	12	Donnybrook, Dublin	2020 Six Nations
173	23 February 2020	England	0	27	Castle Park, Doncaster	2020 Six Nations
174	24 October 2020	Italy	21	7	Donnybrook, Dublin	2020 Six Nations

=== 2021 ===
Test	Date	Opponent	PF	PA	Venue	Tournament
175	10 April 2021	Wales	45	0	Cardiff Arms Park	2021 Six Nations
176	17 April 2021	France	15	56	Donnybrook, Dublin	2021 Six Nations
177	24 April 2021	Italy	25	5	Donnybrook, Dublin	2021 Six Nations
178	13 September 2021	Spain	7	8	Stadio Sergio Lanfranchi, Parma	2021 RWC Qualifier
179	19 September 2021	Italy	15	7	Stadio Sergio Lanfranchi, Parma	2021 RWC Qualifier
180	25 September 2021	Scotland	18	20	Stadio Sergio Lanfranchi, Parma	2021 RWC Qualifier
181	12 November 2021	United States	20	10	RDS Arena, Dublin	
182	20 November 2021	Japan	15	12	RDS Arena, Dublin	

=== 2022 ===
Test	Date	Opponent	PF	PA	Venue	Tournament
183	26 March 2022	Wales	19	27	RDS Arena, Dublin	2022 Six Nations
184	2 April 2022	France	5	40	Stade Ernest-Wallon, Toulouse	2022 Six Nations
185	10 April 2022	Italy	29	8	Musgrave Park, Cork	2022 Six Nations
186	24 April 2022	England	0	69	Welford Road Stadium, Leicester	2022 Six Nations
187	30 April 2022	Scotland	15	14	Kingspan Stadium, Belfast	2022 Six Nations
188	20 August 2022	Japan	57	22	Shizuoka Stadium, Fukuroi	2022 Japan Tour
189	27 August 2022	Japan	10	29	Chichibunomiya Rugby Stadium, Tokyo	2022 Japan Tour

=== 2023 ===
Test	Date	Opponent	PF	PA	Venue	Tournament
190	25 March 2023	Wales	5	31	Cardiff Arms Park	2023 Six Nations
191	1 April 2023	France	3	53	Musgrave Park, Cork	2023 Six Nations
192	15 April 2023	Italy	7	24	Stadio Sergio Lanfranchi, Parma	2023 Six Nations
193	22 April 2023	England	0	48	Musgrave Park, Cork	2023 Six Nations
194	29 April 2023	Scotland	10	36	Edinburgh Rugby Stadium, Edinburgh	2023 Six Nations
195	13 October 2023	Kazakhstan	109	0	The Sevens Stadium, Dubai	2023 WXV 3
196	21 October 2023	Colombia	64	3	The Sevens Stadium, Dubai	2023 WXV 3
197	28 October 2023	Spain	15	13	The Sevens Stadium, Dubai	2023 WXV 3

=== 2024 ===
Test	Date	Opponent	F	A	Venue	Event
198	23 March 2024	France	17	38	Stade Marie-Marvingt, Le Mans	2024 Six Nations
199	31 March 2024	Italy	21	27	RDS Arena, Dublin	2024 Six Nations
200	13 April 2024	Wales	36	5	Musgrave Park, Cork	2024 Six Nations
201	20 April 2024	England	10	88	Twickenham Stadium, London	2024 Six Nations
202	27 April 2024	Scotland	15	12	Ravenhill Stadium, Belfast	2024 Six Nations
203	14 September 2024	Australia	36	10	Kingspan Stadium, Belfast	
204	29 September 2024	New Zealand	29	27	BC Place, Vancouver	2024 WXV 1
205	5 October 2024	Canada	8	21	Langley Events Centre, Langley	2024 WXV 1
206	11 October 2024	United States	26	14	BC Place, Vancouver	2024 WXV 1

=== 2025 ===
Test	Date	Opponent	F	A	Venue	Event
207	22 March 2025	France	15	27	Ravenhill Stadium, Belfast	2025 Six Nations
208	30 March 2025	Italy	54	12	Stadio Sergio Lanfranchi, Parma	2025 Six Nations
209	12 April 2025	England	5	49	Musgrave Park, Cork	2025 Six Nations
210	20 April 2025	Wales	40	14	Rodney Parade, Newport	2025 Six Nations
211	26 April 2025	Scotland	19	26	Edinburgh Rugby Stadium, Edinburgh	2025 Six Nations
212	2 August 2025	Scotland	27	21	Musgrave Park, Cork	2025 World Cup Warm-Ups
213	9 August 2025	Canada	26	47	Ravenhill Stadium, Belfast	2025 World Cup Warm-Ups
214	24 August 2025	Japan	42	14	Franklin's Gardens, Northampton	2025 World Cup
215	31 August 2025	Spain	43	27	Franklin's Gardens, Northampton	2025 World Cup
216	7 September 2025	New Zealand	0	40	Brighton & Hove Albion Stadium, Brighton	2025 World Cup
217	14 September 2025	France	13	18	Sandy Park, Exeter	2025 World Cup

=== 2026 ===
Test	Date	Opponent	PF	PA	Venue	Event
218	11 April 2026	England	12	33	Twickenham Stadium, London	2026 Six Nations
219	18 April 2026	Italy	57	20	Dexcom Stadium, Galway	2026 Six Nations
220	25 April 2026	France	7	26	Stade Marcel-Michelin, Clermont-Ferrand	2026 Six Nations
221	9 May 2026	Wales	33	12	Ravenhill Stadium, Belfast	2026 Six Nations
222	17 May 2026	Scotland	54	5	Aviva Stadium, Dublin	2026 Six Nations
223	20 September 2026	United States	36	40	Tallaght Stadium, Dublin	2026 WXV Global Series
224	27 September 2026	Japan	TBA	TBA	Dexcom Stadium, Galway	2026 WXV Global Series
225	3 October 2026	Japan	TBA	TBA	Musgrave Park, Cork	Rugby union internationals
226	24 October 2026	South Africa	TBA	TBA	Athlone Stadium, Cape Town	2026 WXV Global Series
227	31 October 2026	South Africa	TBA	TBA	Athlone Stadium, Cape Town	2026 WXV Global Series

== Other matches ==
Date	Ireland	PF	PA	Opponent	Venue	Tournament
1994-04-13	Ireland	18	5	(Scotland) Scottish Students	West of Scotland RFC	1994 WRWC
2005-01-09	Ireland	25	19	England Academy	St Mary's RFC, Dublin	
2006-06-20	Irish Barbarians	3	31	Netherlands B	Durban	
June 2006	Irish Barbarians	3	5	South Africa A	Durban	
2006-08-13	Ireland	17	6	South Africa A	Hawick	
2008-12-20	Ireland President's XV	8	19	England	St Mary's RFC, Dublin	
2010-07-18	Ireland XV	15	20	Scotland XV	Lasswade	
2010-08-01	Ireland XV	13	15	Wales XV	Bridgend	
2013-01-20	Ireland XV	39	7	Spain	Ashbourne	
2014-07-20	Ireland XV	27	7	Wales	Estuary Road, Malahide, Dublin	
2016-01-24	Ireland XV	5	15	Wales XV	Ystrad Mynach	
