= 2000 FIRA Women's European Championship =

Sports event

2000 FIRA European Championship
Tournament details
- Host: Spain
- Dates: 8 May 2000– 14 May 2000
- Teams: 8

Final positions
- Champions: France
- Runner-up: Spain

Tournament statistics
- Matches played: 12

The 2000 FIRA Women's European Championship was the fifth edition of the tournament. It saw virtually the same format as 1997.

In Pool A Ireland returned to the competition.

In "Pool B" a tournament had been planned involving Belgium, Germany, Netherlands and Russia. Belgium and Russia withdrew "at the last minute" and were replaced by a French regional team (Flandre). After a double round-robin between these three teams, Germany and Netherlands played against the teams finishing 7th and 8th in Pool A

== Pool A ==
=== Bracket ===
Quarter-finals
8 May – Vera
England	41
Kazakhstan	3
8 May – El Ejido
France	41
Ireland	14
8 May – Roquetas
Spain	58
Italy	16
8 May – Almeria
Scotland	28
Wales	16

Semi-finals
10 May – Roquetas
England	12
France	19
10 May – Almeria
Spain	13
Scotland	10

Final
13 May – Almeria
France	31
Spain	0
Third place
13 May – Almeria
England	40
Scotland	20

Semi-finals
10 May – El Ejido
Kazakhstan	31
Ireland	15
10 May – Vera
Italy	24
Wales	25

Final
24 April – Vera
Kazakhstan	3
Wales	6

=== First round ===
2000-05-08

France	41–14	Ireland

El Ejido, Spain

2000-05-08

England	41–3	Kazakhstan

Vera, Spain

2000-05-08

Scotland	28–6	Wales

Almeria, Spain

2000-05-08

Spain	58–16	Italy

Roquetas, Spain

=== Plate semi-finals ===
2000-05-10

Italy	24–25	Wales

El Ejido, Spain

2000-05-10

Ireland	15–31	Kazakhstan

Vera, Spain

=== Semi-finals ===
2000-05-10

England	12–19	France

Roquetas, Spain

2000-05-10

Spain	13–10	Scotland

Almeria, Spain

=== 7th/8th place ===
Italy awarded 7th place Ireland awarded 8th place

=== Plate final ===
2000-05-13

Wales	6–3	Kazakhstan

Vera, Spain

=== 3rd/4th place ===
2000-05-13

England	40–20	Scotland

Almeria, Spain

=== Final ===
2000-05-13

Spain	0–31	France

Almeria, Spain

== Pool B ==
Games where 20 Minutes each way.

=== Final table ===
Pos	Nation	Pld	W	D	L	PF	PA	PD	Pts
1	(Flanders) Flandre	4	3	0	1	18	14	+4	6
2	Netherlands	4	2	0	2	22	15	+7	4
3	Germany	4	1	0	3	16	27	−11	2

=== Results ===
2000-05-08

Germany	5–12	Netherlands

El Ejido, Spain

2000-05-08

Flandre (Flanders)	8-6	Germany

El Ejido, Spain

2000-05-08

Flandre (Flanders)	5-0	Netherlands

El Ejido, Spain

2000-05-10

Germany	0–7	Netherlands

Roquetas, Spain

2000-05-10

Flandre (Flanders)	0-5	Germany

El Ejido, Spain

2000-05-10

Flandre (Flanders)	5-3	Netherlands

El Ejido, Spain

== Pool A/Pool B playoffs ==
Germany and Netherlands then "played off" against the teams listed as being in 7th and 8th place in Pool A.

2000-05-13

Italy	27–5	Germany

Roquetas, Spain

2000-05-13

Ireland	19–12	Netherlands

El Ejido, Spain

== See also ==
- Women's international rugby union
