= Westpointe =

Neighborhood in Salt Lake City, U.S.

Westpointe is a neighborhood occupying the northwest portions of Salt Lake City, Utah. Westpointe includes the neighborhoods immediately adjacent to the Salt Lake City International Airport, and includes Salt Lake City's newly constructed Regional Athletic Complex, the Jordan River Off-Highway Vehicle State Recreation Area, and several parks and schools.

== Boundaries ==
The Westpointe community encompasses a large land area, including the Salt Lake City International Airport and Salt Lake City International Center, while containing a relatively small residential area. It is defined as west from Redwood Road extending to the western city limits, north of 700 North, extending north to city limits (Davis County, the Great Salt Lake and the Farmington Bay Waterfowl Management Area.)

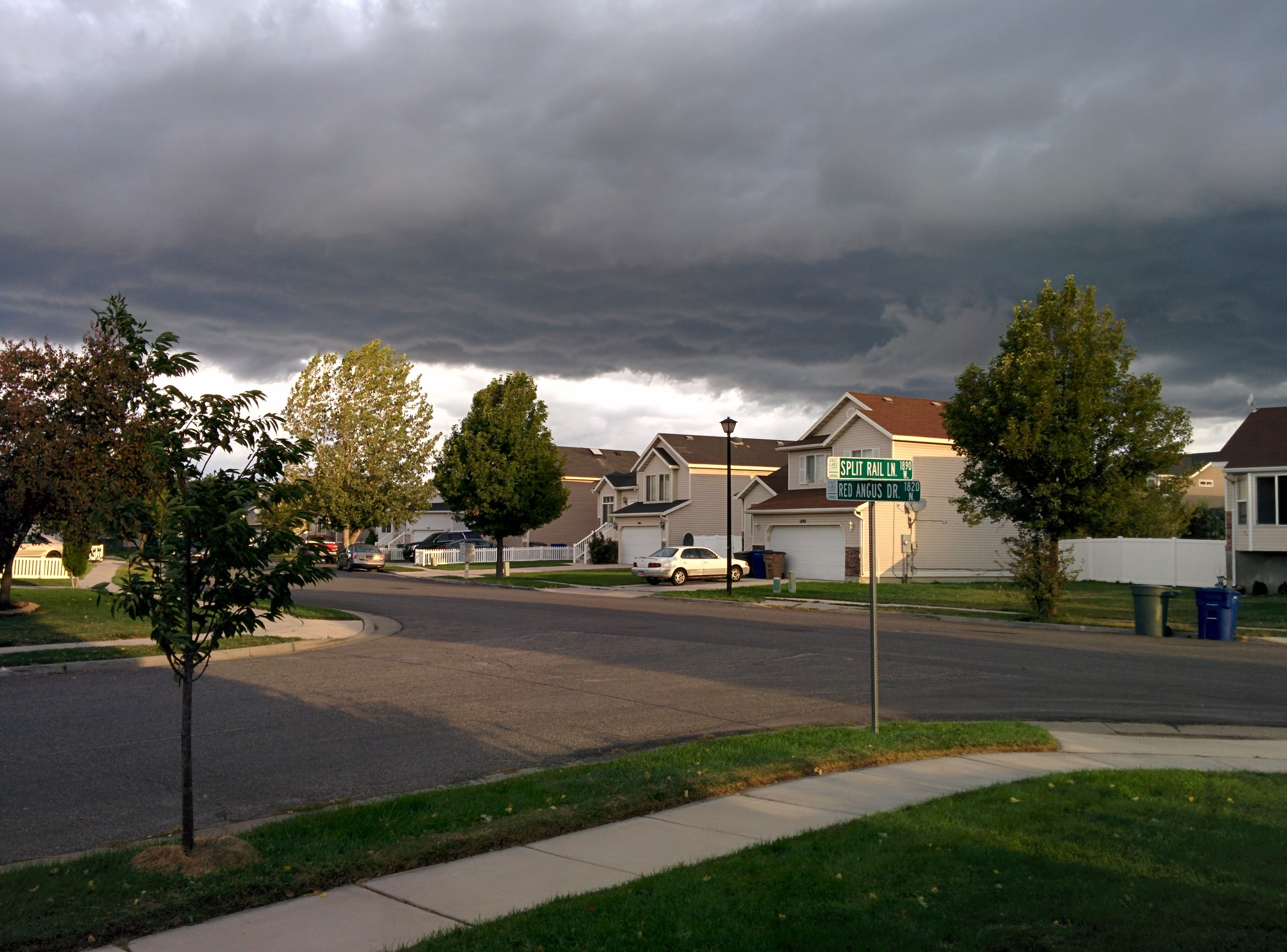
A home in Westpointe, Salt Lake City, Utah

Westpointe lies north of the Jordan Meadows and Poplar Grove neighborhoods and west of the Rose Park neighborhoods. The area is often portrayed in the media as part of Rose Park; in fact, the entire urban area west of I-15 is often referred to as Rose Park, despite its actual boundaries being relatively small.

The entire neighborhood falls within the boundary of West High School, one of Utah's largest and the oldest high schools.

== Education ==
The Westpointe neighborhood lies within the Salt Lake City School District and contains two elementary schools: North Star Elementary and Escalante Elementary. Northwest Middle School is also located in Westpointe. Westpointe is home to the Salt Lake Community College (SLCC) Westpointe Campus. In 2014, SLCC received permission from the State of Utah to acquire nearby land parcels for development of a 121,000-gross-square-feet (GSF) technical education facility for high demand trades; by July 2015, the college had purchased seven parcels totaling 19.61 acres in the Westpointe Center Business Park.

== History ==
Much of the area was primarily agricultural prior to development from the 1980s into the early 2000s

== Culture ==
The neighborhood is one of the most religiously and ethnically diverse areas of Utah.

== Community ==
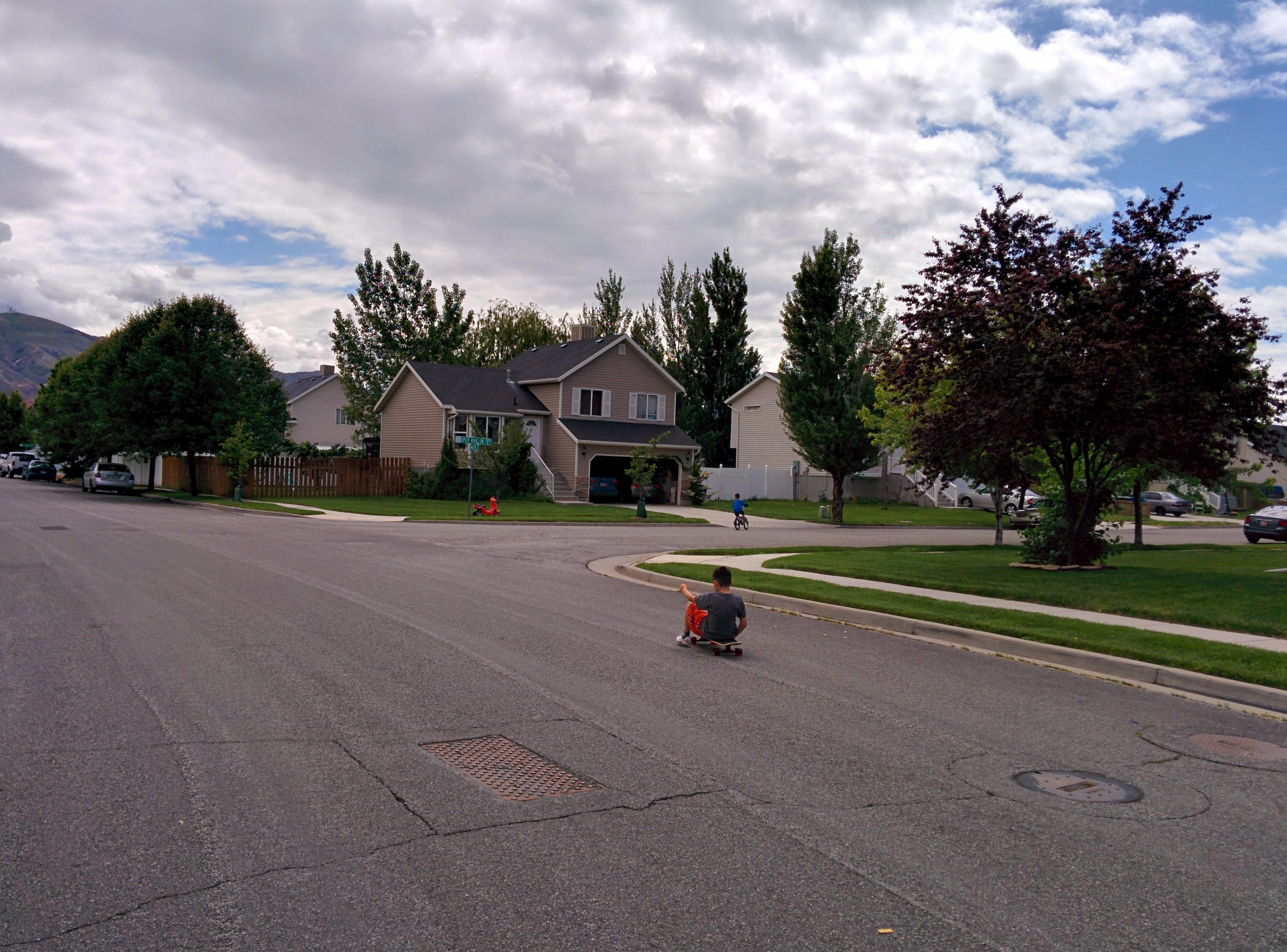
Westpointe neighborhood with children playing

The neighborhood has an active community council. The Westpointe Community Council is made up of an elected body of volunteers meant to serve the interests of Westpointe and the community, providing community input and information to various city departments. Community councils are encouraged to make recommendations to the city on all matters affecting the city or each organization's particular community or neighborhood. Westpointe Community Council meetings are held on the second Wednesday of each month.
