= Gorina =

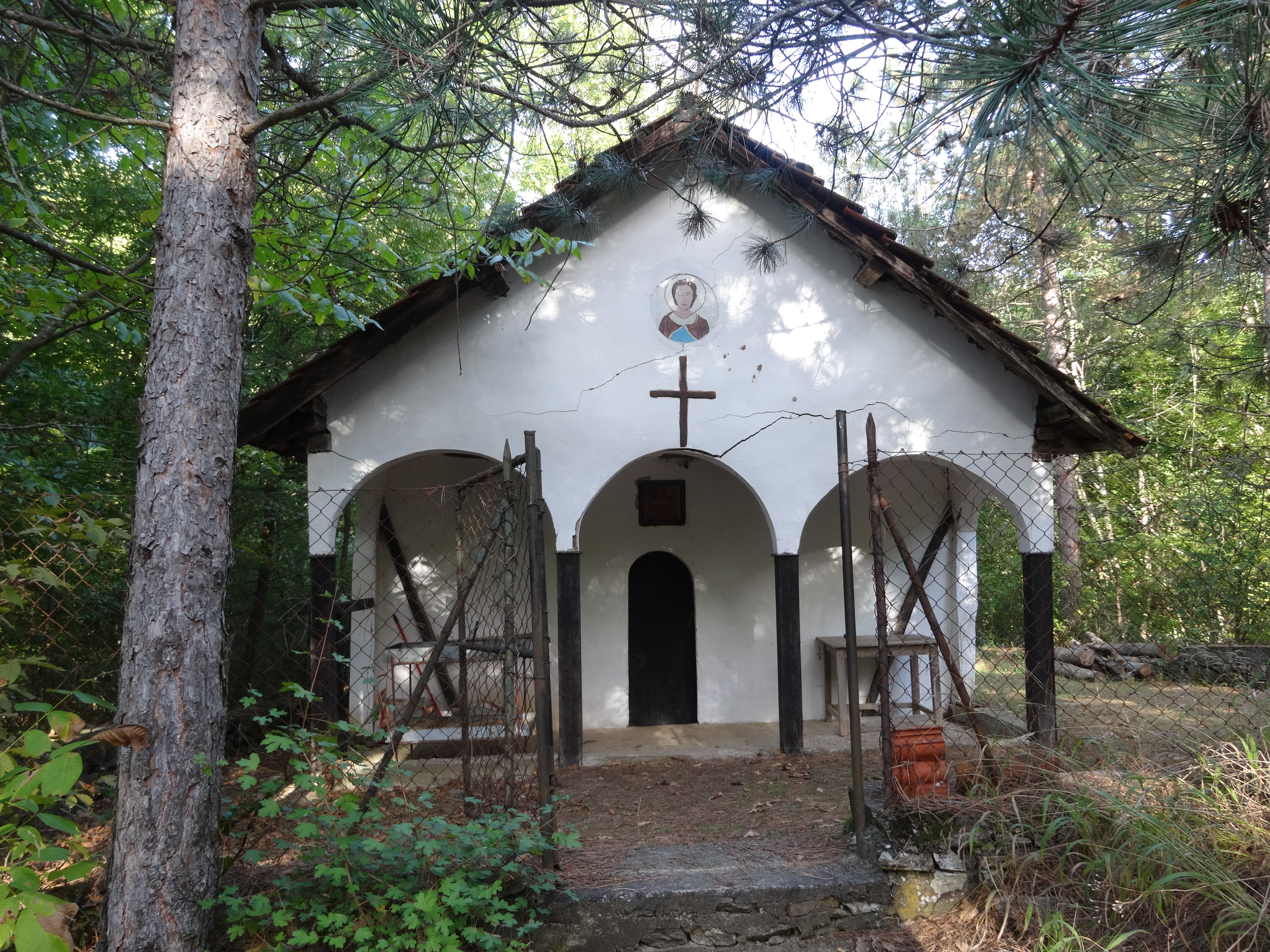

- Location within Serbia
- Coordinates: 42°50′57″N 21°51′20″E
- Country: Serbia
- District: Jablanica District
- Municipality: Leskovac
- Elevation: 1,180 ft (360 m)

Population (2002)
  - Total: 732
- Time zone: UTC+1 (CET)
  - Summer (DST): UTC+2 (CEST)

Gorina is a village in the municipality of Leskovac, Serbia. According to the 2002 census, the village has a population of 732 people.
