= 2011 FIRA Women's European Trophy =

2011 Women's European Trophy
Tournament details
- Host: Spain
- Date: 30 April 2011– 7 May 2011
- Countries: England; Finland; France; Italy; Netherlands; Russia; Spain; Sweden

Final positions
- Champions: England
- Runner-up: Spain

Tournament statistics
- Matches played: 16
- Top scorer(s): Marina Bravo (ESP) (34 pts)
- Most tries: 3 (5 players)

The 2011 Women's European Trophy was the 16th rugby tournament organised by FIRA for the continent's national teams. The venues were in and around A Coruña in Spain, and the games have been played between 30 April and 7 May.

Following Jean-Claude Baqué's statement before the 2010 tournament regarding the aims of the European Trophy, all Six Nations teams were to be "A" teams, and their matches were therefore not "tests". However, though they were called "France A" the French team were their main squad, while Italy "A" teams included 17 of the 22 players from the squad that beat Scotland in the Six Nations a few weeks before. England "A" was also a stronger than normal selection - 11 players had full international caps, including six who had played in the 2011 Six Nations.

Some of the largest crowds ever to watch women's rugby in Spain attended the home team's games, rising from 1,500 for their opening fixture to a near capacity 2,500 for the final.

All games were 35 minutes each way.

== Pool A ==
Position	Nation	Games				Match points		Bonus points		Table points
Position	Nation	Played	Won	Drawn	Lost	For	Against	Tries (4+)	Losing (<=7)	Table points
1	Spain	3	3	0	0	149	14	1	0	13
2	France A	3	2	0	1	160	18	2	1	11
3	Sweden	3	1	0	2	26	58	1	0	5
4	Finland	3	0	0	3	3	248	0	0	0

=== Results ===
2011-04-30

France A	40-3	Sweden
Tries: Manon Andre 4'; Marine de Nadai 14', 27'; Sandra Rabier 35'; Ludivine Coste 48', 61'; Convs: Marie Alice Yahe 14', 27', 35'; Clemence Gueucier 48', 61'		Pens: Rebecka Lundgren 33'

INEF Bastiagueiro
Referee: Claire Hodnett (ENG)

2011-04-30

Spain	119-0	Finland
Tries: Marina Bravo 2', 37'; Angela Del Pan 4', 14'; Barbara Pla 7', 24'; Berta Garcia 11', 20'; Sara de la Llama 18'; Patricia Garcia 31'; Agurtza Obregozo 33'; Julia Pla 35', 39', 54'; Lia Bailan 42'; Meritxed Carreras 46'; Paula Medlin 55'; Marta Lliteras 59'; Isabel Rodriguuez 63'; Convs: Marina Bravo 2', 4', 11', 20', 35', 37', 39', Patricia Garcia 42', 46', 54', 55', 59'

University of Coruña
Referee: Katharina Pickert (GER)

2011-05-02

Spain	12-11	France A
Tries: Aroa Gonzalez 14'; Penalty try 63'; Cons: Marina Bravo 64'		Tries: Andre Manon 32'; Pens: Laura Di Muzio 13', 17'

University of Coruña
Referee: Sherry Trumbull (CAN)

2011-05-02

Finland	0-20	Sweden
		Tries: Rebecka Lundgren 17'; Katarina Boman 19'; Sofia Gertz 26'; Edena Alija 59'

A Malata Ferrol
Referee: Alexandra Pratt (SCO)

2011-05-04

Spain	18-3	Sweden
Tries: Barbara Pla 12'; Aroa Gonzalez 48'; Pens: Rocio Garcia 3'; Marina Bravo 55'		Pens: Emma Skagerlind 21'

University of Coruña
Referee: Alexandra Pratt (SCO)

2011-05-04

Finland	3-109	France A
Pens: Anna Soiluva 23'		Tries: Andre Manon 2'; Clemence Gueucier 6', 9', 38'; Pauline Raymond 13', 25'; Laura Di Munzo 14'; Jennifer Troncy 32'; Audrey Anastiassadis 36'; Marjorie Mayans 42'; Gina Di Munzo 44'; Dioni Augerre 46'; Audrey Parra 49', 53'; Anais Poirot 53', 70'; Audrey Forlani 65'; Cons: Laura Di Munzo 3', 7', 10', 26', 33'; Dioni Augerre 16'; Clemence Gueucier 36', 40', 43', 47', 50'; Clemence Rousseau 70'

INEF Bastiaqueiro
Referee: Itziar Diaz Murga (ESP)

== Pool B ==
Position	Nation	Games				Match points		Bonus points		Table points
Position	Nation	Played	Won	Drawn	Lost	For	Against	Tries (4+)	Losing (<=7)	Table points
1	England A	3	3	0	0	80	0	2	0	14
2	Italy A	3	1	0	2	51	25	1	2	7
3	Netherlands	3	1	0	2	30	70	0	1	5
4	Russia	3	1	0	2	17	83	0	0	4

=== Results ===
2011-04-30

England A	5-0	Italy A
Try: Kay Wilson 5'

University of Coruña
Referee: Sherri Trumbull (CAN)

2011-04-30

Netherlands	10-17	Russia
Tries: Christy Van Oorschot 38'; Rita Wiri 65'		Tries: Marina Petrova 4', 22'; Ann Gottseva 58'; Convs.: Natalia Selyutina 5'

INEF Bastiagueiro
Referee: Alexandra Pratt (SCO)

2011-05-02

Italy A	34-0	Russia
Tries: Sara Pettinelli 8'; Luna Nicchi 14', 54'; Michela Tondinelli 30'; M. Chiara Nespoli 34'; Cons: Michela Tondinelli 9', 15', 34'; Pens: Michela Tondinelli 20'

Fortecarmoa, Vilagarcía
Referee: Claire Hodnett (ENG)

2011-05-02

England A	36-0	Netherlands
Tries: Marlie Packer 1'; Nicola Hoola 5', 32'; Kay Wilson 9'; Ceri Large 12'; Tamara Taylor 21'; Cons: Ceri Large 1', 5', 12'

INEF Bastiaqueiro
Referee: Itziar DIAZ (ESP)

2011-05-04

Italy A	17-20	Netherlands
Tries: Manuela Furlan 38'; Lucia Gai 64'; Cons: Michela Tondinelli 38', 65'; Pens: Michela Tondinelli 56'		Tries: Alexia Mavroudis 32'; Nicole Kwee 48'; Joyce van Altena 70'; Cons: Rita Wiri 48'; Drop: Rita Wiri 29'

A Malata, Ferrol
Referee: K Pickert (GER)

2011-05-04

England A	39-0	Russia
Tries: Francesca Matthews 3', 48'; Ceri Large 25', 58'; Sarah McKenna 34'; Nicole Hoole 65'; Charlotte Male 70'; Cons: Sarah McKenna 25', 35'

Fotecarmoa, Vilagarcía
Referee: Sherry Trumbull (CAN)

== 7th place ==
2011-05-07

Finland	5-22	Russia
Try: Minna Raatikka 46'		Tries: Ekaterin Kazakova 4', 52'; Marina Petrova 10'; Elena Smirnova 34'; Cons: Anastasii Mukhariamova 35'

INEF Bastiagueiro
Referee: Alexandra Pratt (SCO)

== 5th place ==
2011-05-07

Netherlands	21-5	Sweden
Tries: Nicole Kwee 21', 58'; Lusan Beijens 61'; Cons: Rita Wiri 21', 60', 61'		Try: Katarina Boman 42'

INEF Bastiagueiro
Referee: Itziar Diaz (ESP)

== 3rd place ==
2011-05-07

France A	17-7	Italy A
Tries: Marjorie Mayans 9'; Audrey Parra 18'; Cons: Laura Di Muzio 14', 18'; Pens: Laura Di Muzio 41'		Try: Flavia Severin 26'; Cons: Michela Tondinelli 26'

University of Coruña
Referee: Claire Hodnett (ENG)

== Final ==
2011-05-07

Spain	3-5	England A
Pen: Patricia Garcia 50'		Try: Sarah Hunter 68'

University of Coruña
Referee: Sherry Trumbull (CAN)

== See also ==
- Women's international rugby union
- Official website
