= 1998 Women's Home Nations Championship =

European women's rugby tournament held in 1998

- Date: 8 February 1998 - 5 April 1998
- Countries: England; Ireland; Scotland; Wales

Tournament statistics
- Champions: Scotland (1st title)
- Grand Slam: Scotland (1st title)
- Triple Crown: Scotland (1st title)
- Matches played: 6

The 1998 Women's Home Nations Championship was the third and final Women's Home Nations Championship and was won by Scotland, who achieved the Triple Crown. In order to complete a Grand Slam, Scotland also defeated France outside of the competition.

== Final table ==
Pos	Team	Pld	W	D	L	PF	PA	PD	Pts
1	Scotland	3	3	0	0	45	17	+28	6
2	England	3	2	0	1	96	28	+68	4
3	Wales	3	1	0	2	51	61	−10	2
4	Ireland	3	0	0	3	18	104	−86	0

== Results ==
1998-02-08

Ireland	0–15	Scotland

Old Belvedere, Dublin

1998-02-15

England	29–12	Wales

Waterloo

1998-03-01

Wales	12–22	Scotland

Cardiff

1998-03-21

Scotland	8–5	England

Stewarts Melville

1998-03-22

Ireland	10–27	Wales

Old Crescent RFC, Rosbrien

1998-04-05

England	62–8	Ireland

Worcester

== See also ==
- Women's Six Nations Championship
- Women's international rugby union
