= 2001 FIRA Women's European Championship =

2001 FIRA European Championship
Tournament details
- Host: France
- Dates: 6 May 2001– 12 May 2001
- Teams: 12

Final positions
- Champions: Scotland
- Runner-up: Spain

Tournament statistics
- Matches played: 18

The 2001 FIRA Women's European Championship was the sixth edition of the tournament and featured 12 countries. It was the first divided into two pools - A and B, with the strongest eight sides in the former. The tournament was also for the first time spread around several grounds in a region, rather than being played at one location. The A Pool was won by Scotland, and the B pool by Sweden. Both France and England were represented by their second string "A" teams.

== Pool A ==
=== Bracket ===
Quarter-finals
6 May – Lille
England	29
Kazakhstan	15
6 May – Lille
Spain	43
Italy	3
6 May – Lille
France	45
Ireland	9
6 May – Lille
Scotland	13
Wales	3

Semi-finals
10 May – Lille
England	8
Spain	15
10 May – Lille
France	6
Scotland	9

Final
12 May – Lille
Spain	3
Scotland	15
Third place
12 May – Lille
France	23
England	34

Semi-finals
10 May – Lille
Ireland	10
Wales	15
10 May – Lille
Italy	0
Kazakhstan	20

Final
12 May – Lille
Wales	17
Kazakhstan	7
Third place
12 May – Lille
Ireland	9
Italy	8

=== First round ===
2001-05-06

France	45–9	Ireland

Marquette-lez-Lille, France

2001-05-06

Spain	34–3	Italy

Lille, France

2001-05-06

England	29–15	Kazakhstan

Tourcoing, France

2001-05-06

Scotland	13–3	Wales

Hazebrouck, France

=== Plate semi-finals ===
2001-05-10

Ireland	10–15	Wales

Tourcoing, France

2001-05-10

Italy	0–20	Kazakhstan

Villeneuve d'ascq, France

=== Semi-finals ===
2001-05-10

France	6–9	Scotland

Armentières, France

2001-05-10

England	8–15	Spain

Roubaix, France

=== 7th/8th ===
2001-05-12

Ireland	9–8	Italy

Lille, France

=== Plate final ===
2001-05-12

Wales	17–7	Kazakhstan

Villeneuve d'ascq, France

=== 3rd/4th place ===
2001-05-12

France	23–34	England

Stadium Nord, Lille, France

=== Final ===
2001-05-12

Spain	3–15	Scotland

Stadium Nord, Lille, France

== Pool B ==
=== Final table ===
Pos	Nation	Pld	W	D	L	PF	PA	PD	Pts
1	Sweden	3	3	0	0	118	25	+93	6
2	Netherlands	3	2	0	1	95	19	+76	4
3	Germany	3	1	0	2	86	32	+54	2
4	Belgium	3	0	0	3	0	223	−223	0

=== Results ===
2001-05-07

Belgium	0–66	Netherlands

IC Lille, France

2001-05-07

Germany	13–15	Sweden

Villeneuve d' Ascq, France

2001-05-09

Germany	6–17	Netherlands

Armentières, France

2001-05-09

Belgium	0–90	Sweden

Roubaix, France

2001-05-12

Netherlands	12–13	Sweden

Lille, France

2001-05-12

Belgium	0–67	Germany

Armentières, France

== See also ==
- Women's international rugby union
