= 1999 Women's Five Nations Championship =

Rugby union competition

- Date: 6 February 1999 - 10 April 1999
- Countries: England; Ireland; Scotland; Wales; France

Tournament statistics
- Champions: England (3rd title)
- Grand Slam: England (3rd title)
- Triple Crown: England (3rd title)
- Matches played: 10

The 1999 Women's Five Nations Championship was the first Women's Five Nations Championship and was won by England, who achieved the Grand Slam.

== Final table ==
Pos	Team	Pld	W	D	L	PF	PA	PD	Pts
1	England	4	4	0	0	186	26	+160	8
2	France	4	3	0	1	114	36	+78	6
3	Scotland	4	2	0	2	70	87	−17	4
4	Wales	4	1	0	3	42	140	−98	2
5	Ireland	4	0	0	4	5	128	−123	0

== Results ==
1999-02-07

Ireland	0–24	France

Dublin

1999-02-07

Scotland	23–0	Wales

Inverleith, Edinburgh

1999-02-28

England	34–7	Scotland

Richmond RFC

1999-02-21

Wales	26–0	Ireland

Stradey Park

1999-03-05

France	34–5	Wales

Savigny-sur-Orge

1999-03-07

Ireland	0–56	England

Dublin

1999-03-21

England	13–8	France

Worcester

1999-03-21

Scotland	22–5	Ireland

Inverleith, Edinburgh

1999-04-09

France	48–18	Scotland

Melun

1999-04-10

Wales	11–83	England

Swansea

== See also ==
- Women's Six Nations Championship
- Women's international rugby union
