= 1999 FIRA Women's European Championship =

1999 FIRA European Championship
Tournament details
- Host: Italy
- Dates: 19 April 1999– 24 April 1999
- Teams: 8

Final positions
- Champions: France
- Runner-up: Spain

Tournament statistics
- Matches played: 12

The 1999 FIRA Women's European Championship was the fourth edition of the tournament; it saw the same format as 1997, but with Germany and Ireland being replaced by Kazakhstan and Wales.

== Bracket ==
Quarter-finals
19 April – Belluno
England | 91
Netherlands | 3
19 April – Belluno
France | 28
Kazakhstan | 0
19 April – Belluno
Spain | 14
Wales | 8
19 April – Belluno
Italy | 15
Scotland | 43

Semi-finals
21 April – Belluno
England | 0
France | 19
21 April – Belluno
Spain | 11
Scotland | 9

Final
24 April – Belluno
France | 13
Spain | 5
Third place
24 April – Belluno
England | 13
Scotland | 15

Semi-finals
21 April – Belluno
Netherlands | 0
Kazakhstan | 24
21 April – Belluno
Italy | 17
Wales | 28

Final
24 April – Belluno
Kazakhstan | 22
Wales | 11
Third place
24 April – Belluno
Italy | 50
Netherlands | 18

== First round ==
1999-04-19

| France | 28–0 | Kazakhstan |

Belluno, Italy

1999-04-19

| England | 91–3 | Netherlands |

Belluno, Italy

1999-04-19

| Spain | 14–8 | Wales |

Belluno, Italy

1999-04-19

| Italy | 15–43 | Scotland |

Belluno, Italy

== Plate semi-finals ==
1999-04-21

| Netherlands | 0–24 | Kazakhstan |

Belluno, Italy

1999-04-21

| Italy | 17–28 | Wales |

Belluno, Italy

== Semi-finals ==
1999-04-21

| England | 0–19 | France |

Belluno, Italy

1999-04-21

| Spain | 11–9 | Scotland |

Belluno, Italy

== 7th/8th place ==
1999-04-24

| Italy | 50–18 | Netherlands |

Belluno, Italy

== Plate final ==
1999-04-24

| Wales | 11–22 | Kazakhstan |

Belluno, Italy

== 3rd/4th place ==
1999-04-24

| England | 13–15 | Scotland |

Belluno, Italy

== Final ==
1999-04-24

| France | 13–5 | Spain |

Belluno, Italy

== See also ==
- Women's international rugby union
