= 2003 Women's Six Nations Championship =

- Date: 15 February 2003 - 29 March 2003
- Countries: England; France; Ireland; Scotland; Spain; Wales

Tournament statistics
- Champions: England (6th title)
- Grand Slam: England (6th title)
- Triple Crown: England (7th title)
- Matches played: 15

The 2003 Women's Six Nations Championship was the second series of the rugby union Women's Six Nations Championship and was won by England, who achieved the Grand Slam.

== Table ==
Pos	Team	Pld	W	D	L	PF	PA	PD	Pts
1	England	5	5	0	0	272	10	+262	10
2	Scotland	5	4	0	1	101	60	+41	8
3	France	5	3	0	2	95	90	+5	6
4	Wales	5	2	0	3	83	112	−29	4
5	Ireland	5	1	0	4	19	108	−89	2
6	Spain	5	0	0	5	14	204	−190	0

== Results ==
2003-02-15

England	57–0	France

Twickenham

2003-02-15

Wales	44–0	Spain

Cardiff Arms Park

2003-02-15

Scotland	25–0	Ireland

Netherdale (Gala)

2003-02-21

Wales	7–69	England

Cardiff Arms Park

2003-02-22

France	14–19	Scotland

Evreux

2003-02-22

Spain	0–16	Ireland

Madrid

2003-03-09

Ireland	0–20	France

Limerick

2003-03-09

England	69–0	Spain

Harlequins RFC

2003-03-09

Scotland	9–8	Wales

Meadowbank

2003-03-21

Wales	17–0	Ireland

Cardiff Arms Park

2003-03-22

Spain	7–27	France

Girona

2003-03-22

England	31–0	Scotland

Harlequins RFC

2003-03-28

Ireland	3–46	England

Thomond Park, Limerick

2003-03-28

France	34–7	Wales

Paris

2003-03-29

Scotland	48–7	Spain

Meadowbank

== See also ==
- Women's Six Nations Championship
- Women's international rugby union
