= 2004 Women's Six Nations Championship =

- Date: 14 February 2004 - 27 March 2004
- Countries: England; France; Ireland; Scotland; Spain; Wales

Tournament statistics
- Champions: France (2nd title)
- Grand Slam: France (2nd title)
- Triple Crown: England (8th title)
- Matches played: 15

The 2004 Women's Six Nations Championship, also known as the 2004 RBS Women's 6 Nations due to the tournament's sponsorship by the Royal Bank of Scotland, was the third series of the rugby union Women's Six Nations Championship and was won by France, who achieved the Grand Slam.

== Table ==
Pos	Team	Pld	W	D	L	PF	PA	PD	Pts
1	France	5	5	0	0	97	29	+68	10
2	England	5	4	0	1	207	36	+171	8
3	Spain	5	3	0	2	29	114	−85	6
4	Scotland	5	2	0	3	71	52	+19	4
5	Wales	5	1	0	4	34	130	−96	2
6	Ireland	5	0	0	5	35	112	−77	0

== Results ==
2004-02-14

Wales	10–30	Scotland

Arms Park, Cardiff

2004-02-15

Spain	3–71	England

Pinares de Venecia, Zaragoza

2004-02-15

France	22–5	Ireland

Savigny sur Orge, Paris

2004-02-21

Ireland	13–14	Wales

Thomond Park

2004-02-21

Scotland	7–20	England

Netherdale, Galashiels

2004-02-21

France	24–0	Spain

Perpignan

2004-03-06

England	51–10	Ireland

Twickenham, London

2004-03-06

Spain	6–5	Scotland

Lalin, Corunna

2004-03-07

Wales	0–22	France

Arms Park, Cardiff

2004-03-20

England	53–3	Wales

The Stoop, London

2004-03-20

Ireland	7–8	Spain

Thomond Park, Limerick

2004-03-21

Scotland	12–16	France

Murrayfield

2004-03-27

France	13–12	England

Bourg-en-Bresse, Lyon

2004-03-27

Wales	7–12	Spain

Arms Park, Cardiff

2004-03-27

Ireland	0–17	Scotland

Thomond Park, Limerick

== See also ==
- Women's Six Nations Championship
- Women's international rugby union
