= 2010 Women's Six Nations Championship =

- Date: 5 February 2010 – 21 March 2010
- Countries: England; France; Ireland; Italy; Scotland; Wales

Tournament statistics
- Champions: England (11th title)
- Grand Slam: England (10th title)
- Triple Crown: England (13th title)
- Matches played: 15
- Tries scored: 65 (4.33 per match)
- Top point scorer: (Ireland) Niamh Briggs (29 points)
- Top try scorer: (England) Emily Scarratt (4 tries)

The 2010 Women's Six Nations Championship, also known as the 2010 RBS Women's 6 Nations due to the tournament's sponsorship by the Royal Bank of Scotland, was the ninth series of the Women's Six Nations Championship, an annual women's rugby union competition between six European rugby union national teams. The tournament was held between 5 February and 21 March 2010; the same weekends as the men's tournament was being played.

The championship was contested by England, France, Ireland, Italy, Scotland and Wales. England won the tournament, achieving a final 11–10 victory over France to win the Grand Slam, and their fifth title in a row.

== Final table ==
Position	Nation	Games				Points				Table points
Position	Nation	Played	Won	Drawn	Lost	For	Against	Difference	Tries	Table points
1	England	5	5	0	0	156	15	+141	26	10
2	France	5	3	0	2	97	47	+50	14	6
3	Ireland	5	3	0	2	69	52	+17	9	6
4	Scotland	5	1	1	3	31	108	−77	4	3
5	Italy	5	1	1	3	44	129	−85	6	3
6	Wales	5	1	0	4	49	95	−46	6	2

== Fixtures and results ==
On early December 2009 it was announced the fixtures scheduled for 2010 Championship. Three teams played all their home games at the same venue: Pillar Data Arena (England), Milltown House (Ireland) and Brewery Field (Wales).

=== Week 1 ===
5 February 2010

Ireland	22–5	Italy
Tries: Joy Neville 37', 48'; Alison Miller 63'; Cons: Niamh Briggs 48', 63'; Drop: Niamh Briggs 12'		Try: Silvia Peron 80'

Milltown House, Ashbourne, County Meath, Leinster
Referee: Sarah Corrigan (Australia)

6 February 2010

England	31–0	Wales
Tries: Heather Fisher 4'; Katherine Merchant 28'; Emily Scarratt 40'+4'; Katy McLean 64'; Rochelle Clark 76'; Cons: Katy McLean 40'+4', 64', 76'

Pillar Data Arena, Esher, Surrey
Referee: David Keane (Ireland)

6 February 2010

Scotland	10–8	France
Tries: Lucy Millard 46', 80'		Try: Sandra Rabier 4'; Pen: Christelle Le Duff 57'

Hawthornden, Lasswade, Midlothian
Referee: Stefano Mancini (Italy)

=== Week 2 ===
12 February 2010

France	19–9	Ireland
Tries: Fanny Horta 15', 21'; Stéphanie Loyer 53'; Cons: Aurélie Bailon 15', 53'		Pens: Niamh Briggs 35', 39', 62'

Stade des Allées, Blois, Loir-et-Cher
Referee: Clare Daniels (England)

13 February 2010

Italy	0–41	England
		Tries: Michaela Staniford 5'; Fiona Pocock 11'; Rochelle Clark 19'; Catherine Spencer 40', 80'+1'; Heather Fisher 56'; Margareth Alphonsi 76'; Cons: Alice Richardson 11', 56'; Katy McLean 76'

Stadio Nando Capra, Noceto, Parma
Referee: Mhairi Hay (Scotland)

14 February 2010

Wales	28–12	Scotland
Tries: Caryl James 9', 16'; Non Evans 31'; Mared Evans 60'; Cons: Non Evans 9', 16', 31', 60'		Tries: Tanya Griffith 13'; Lynne Reid 79'; Cons: Louise Dalgliesh 13'

Brewery Field, Bridgend, Mid Glamorgan
Referee: Sarah Corrigan (Australia)

=== Week 3 ===
28 February 2010

Wales	3–15	France
Pen: Non Evans 6'		Tries: Caroline Ladagnous 59'; Sandrine Agricole 65'; Con: Aurélie Bailon 65'; Pen: Aurélie Bailon 64'

Brewery Field, Bridgend, Mid Glamorgan
Referee: Dana Teagarden (United States)

28 February 2010

Italy	6–6	Scotland
Pens: Veronica Schiavon 11', 36'		Pens: Sarah Gill 54', 73'

Stadio Maurizio Natali, Colleferro, Rome
Referee: Chris Williams (Wales)

28 February 2010

England	22–5	Ireland
Tries: Margareth Alphonsi 4'; Emily Scarratt 6'; Claire Allan 59'; Amy Turner 69'; Con: Katy McLean 6'		Try: Kate O’Loughlin 17'

Pillar Data Arena, Esher, Surrey
Referee: Stefano Marrama (Italy)

=== Week 4 ===
12 March 2010

Ireland	18–3	Wales
Tries: Niamh Briggs 15'; Tania Rosser 57'; Joy Neville 76'; Pen: Niamh Briggs 72'		Pen: Non Evans 5'

Milltown House, Ashbourne, County Meath, Leinster
Referee: Eric Gauzins (France)

13 March 2010

Scotland	0–51	England
		Tries: Amber Penrith 5', 55'; Heather Fisher 10'; Emily Scarratt 14', 80'; Jo McGilchrist 35'; Fiona Pocock 45', 77'; Rebecca Essex 59'; Cons: Katy McLean 10', 45'; Emily Scarratt 59'

Meggetland, Edinburgh
Referee: Paul Haycock (Ireland)

13 March 2010

France	45–14	Italy
Tries: Sandrine Agricole 8', 45'; Marie-Charlotte Hebel 13'; Stéphanie Loyer 19'; Sandra Rabier 32'; Céline Allainmat 58', 77'; Cons: Aurélie Bailon 8', 13', 19', 45', 77'		Tries: Licia Stefan 64'; Manuela Furlan 74'; Cons: Veronica Schiavon 64', 74'

Stade Yves-du-Manoir, Montpellier, Hérault
Referee: Charles Samson (Scotland)

=== Week 5 ===
19 March 2010

Ireland	15–3	Scotland
Tries: Nora Stapleton 46'; Sinead Ryan 73'; Con: Niamh Briggs 73'; Pen: Niamh Briggs 32'		Pen: Nicola Halfpenny 34'

Milltown House, Ashbourne, County Meath, Leinster
Referee: Hervé Dubes (France)

19 March 2010

France	10–11	England
Try: Céline Allainmat 55'; Pen: Aurélie Bailon 14'; Con: Aurélie Bailon 55'		Try: Amy Turner 17'; Pens: Katy McLean 47', 64'

Stade Commandant Bougouin, Rennes, Ille-et-Vilaine
Referee: Alan Rogan (Ireland)

21 March 2010

Wales	15–19	Italy
Tries: Naomi Thomas 25'; Non Evans 34'; Con: Non Evans 25'; Pen: Awen Thomas 65'		Tries: Flavia Severin 44', 54'; Maria Diletta Veronese 57'; Cons: Michela Tondinelli 54', 57'

Brewery Field, Bridgend, Mid Glamorgan
Referee: Andrea Ttofa (England)

== Leading scorers ==
=== Point scorers ===
Points	Name	Played	Team	Notes
29	Niamh Briggs	5	Ireland	1 try, 3 cons, 5 pens, 1 drop
26	Non Evans	5	Wales	2 tries, 5 cons, 2 pens
25	Katy McLean	5	England	1 try, 7 cons, 2 pens
24	Aurélie Bailon	5	France	9 cons, 2 pens
22	Emily Scarratt	5	England	4 tries, 1 con
15	Céline Allainmat	2	France	3 tries
15	Fiona Pocock	4	England	3 tries
15	Sandrine Agricole	5	France	3 tries
15	Heather Fisher	5	England	3 tries
15	Joy Neville	5	Ireland	3 tries

=== Other point scorers ===
10 points: Margareth Alphonsi (England), Rochelle Clark (England), Fanny Horta (France), Caryl James (Wales), Stéphanie Loyer (France), Lucy Millard (Scotland), Amber Penrith (England), Sandra Rabier (France), Veronica Schiavon (Italy), Flavia Severin (Italy), Catherine Spencer (England), Amy Turner (England)
6 points: Sarah Gill (Scotland)
5 points: Claire Allan (England), Rebecca Essex (England), Mared Evans (Wales), Manuela Furlan (Italy), Tanya Griffith (Scotland), Marie-Charlotte Hebel (France), Caroline Ladagnous (France), Jo McGilchrist (England), Katherine Merchant (England), Alison Miller (Ireland), Kate O'Loughlin (Ireland), Silvia Peron (Italy), Lynne Reid (Scotland), Tanya Rosser (Ireland), Sinead Ryan (Ireland), Michella Staniford (England), Nora Stapleton (Ireland), Licia Stefan (Italy), Naomi Thomas (Wales), Maria Diletta Veronese (Italy)
4 points: Alice Richardson (England), Michela Tondinelli (Italy)
3 points: Nicola Halfpenny (Scotland), Christelle Le Duff (France), Arwen Thomas (Wales)
2 points: Louise Dalgliesh (Scotland)

== See also ==
- Women's Six Nations Championship
- Women's international rugby
