= 2000 Women's Five Nations Championship =

Rugby union competition

- Date: 4 February 2000 - 1 April 2000
- Countries: England; Scotland; Wales; France; Spain

Tournament statistics
- Champions: England (4th title)
- Grand Slam: England (4th title)
- Triple Crown: England (4th title)
- Matches played: 10

The 2000 Women's Five Nations Championship was the second Women's Five Nations Championship and was won by England, who achieved the Grand Slam. Spain took part for the first time, replacing Ireland.

== Final table ==
Pos	Team	Pld	W	D	L	PF	PA	PD	Pts
1	England	4	4	0	0	170	24	+146	8
2	France	4	3	0	1	83	46	+37	6
3	Spain	4	2	0	2	43	88	−45	4
4	Scotland	4	1	0	3	61	99	−38	2
5	Wales	4	0	0	4	32	132	−100	0

== Results ==
2000-02-04

Wales	10–27	France

Swansea

2000-02-06

England	31–7	Spain

Banbury

2000-02-18

France	8–24	England

Massy, Paris

2000-02-18

Spain	13–9	Scotland

Murcia

2000-03-05

England	51–0	Wales

Newbury

2000-03-06

Scotland	7–10	France

Edinburgh

2000-03-18

France	38–5	Spain

Dax

2000-03-19

Wales	12–36	Scotland

Caerphilly

2000-04-01

Scotland	9–64	England

Edinburgh

2000-04-01

Spain	18–10	Wales

Majadahonda, Madrid

== See also ==
- Women's Six Nations Championship
- Women's international rugby union
