= 2002 Women's Six Nations Championship =

- Date: 2 February 2002 – 7 April 2002
- Countries: England; France; Ireland; Scotland; Spain; Wales

Tournament statistics
- Champions: France (1st title)
- Grand Slam: France (1st title)
- Triple Crown: England (6th title)
- Matches played: 15

The 2002 Women's Six Nations Championship was the first series of the rugby union Women's Six Nations Championship and was won by France, who achieved the Grand Slam.

== Table ==
Pos	Team	Pld	W	D	L	PF	PA	PD	Pts
1	France	5	5	0	0	134	29	+105	10
2	England	5	4	0	1	224	44	+180	8
3	Scotland	5	3	0	2	81	74	+7	6
4	Spain	5	2	0	3	56	100	−44	4
5	Wales	5	1	0	4	16	116	−100	2
6	Ireland	5	0	0	5	11	159	−148	0

== Results ==
=== Round 1 ===
2 February 2002

France	24–0	Spain

Bègles

3 February 2002

Ireland	5–13	Wales

Thomond Park, Limerick

3 February 2002

Scotland	8–35	England

Dunbar

=== Round 2 ===
15 February 2002

Wales	0–20	France

Brewery Field, Bridgend

16 February 2002

Spain	14–17	Scotland

Barcelona

2002-02-17

England	79–0	Ireland

Worcester

=== Round 3 ===
1 March 2002

France	22–17	England

Tournon, Lyon

2 March 2002

Spain	20–0	Wales

Madrid

2 March 2002

Ireland	0–13	Scotland

Limerick

=== Round 4 ===
23 March 2002

England	40–0	Wales

London Welsh

24 March 2002

Scotland	12–22	France

Inverleith

25 March 2002

Ireland	6–8	Spain

Limerick

=== Round 5 ===
5 April 2002

France	46–0	Ireland

Melun

7 April 2002

Spain	14–53	England

Madrid

7 April 2002

Wales	3–31	Scotland

Stradey Park

== See also ==
- Women's Six Nations Championship
- Women's international rugby union
