= 2004 FIRA Women's European Championship =

2004 FIRA European Championship
Tournament details
- Host: France
- Dates: 1 May 2004– 8 May 2004
- Teams: 8

Final positions
- Champions: France
- Runner-up: England

Tournament statistics
- Matches played: 12

The 2004 FIRA Women's European Championship was the ninth edition of the tournament. It took place at grounds in and around the Midi-Pyrénées region of France (near Toulouse) between 30 April to 9 May. Pool A reverted to a single eight nation knockout, while Pool B was a round-robin. France repeated Netherlands feat of winning as hosts.

== Pool A ==
=== Bracket ===
Quarter-finals
1 May – Castres
France	24
Spain	5
1 May – Castelsarrasin
Scotland	32
Sweden	0
2 May – Beaumont de Lomagne
England	73
Italy	7
2 May – St-Jean-du-Falga
Ireland	7
Wales	24

Semi-finals
5 May – St Orens
France	25
Scotland	6
5 May – Villefranche-de-Lauragais
England	39
Wales	3

Final
8 May – Toulouse
France	8
England	6
Third place
8 May – Tournefeuille
Scotland	11
Wales	10

Semi-finals
5 May – Balma
Ireland	14
Italy	5
5 May – Quint Fonsegrives
Spain	31
Sweden	5

Final
8 May – Lalande Aucamville
Ireland	20
Spain	12
Third place
8 May – Midi-Pyrénées
Italy	13
Sweden	0

=== First round ===
2004-05-01

France	24–5	Spain

Castres, France

2004-05-02

Ireland	7–24	Wales

St-Jean-du-Falga, France

2004-05-02

England	73–7	Italy

Beaumont de Lomagne, France

2004-05-02

Scotland	32–0	Sweden

Castelsarrasin, France

==== Plate semi-finals ====
2004-05-05

Ireland	14–5	Italy

Balma, France

2004-05-05

Spain	31–5	Sweden

Quint Fonsegrives, France

==== Semi-finals ====
2004-05-05

France	25–6	Scotland

St Orens

2004-05-05

England	39–3	Wales

Villefranche-de-Lauragais, France

==== 7th/8th ====
2004-05-08

Italy	13–0	Sweden

L'Union, Midi-Pyrénées, France

==== Plate final ====
2004-05-08

Ireland	20–12	Spain

Lalande Aucamville, France

==== 3rd/4th place ====
2004-05-08

Scotland	11–10	Wales

Tournefeuille, France

==== Final ====
2004-05-08

France	8–6	England

Stade des Minimes, Toulouse, France

== Pool B ==
=== Final table ===
Pos	Nation	Pld	W	D	L	PF	PA	PD	Pts
1	Netherlands	3	3	0	0	249	3	+246	6
2	Germany	3	2	0	1	114	30	+84	4
3	Norway	3	1	0	2	8	150	−142	2
4	Denmark	3	0	0	3	8	196	−188	0

=== Results ===
2004-05-02

Denmark	3–141	Netherlands

Grenade, France

2004-05-02

Germany	67–0	Norway

Grenade, France

2004-05-05

Netherlands	78–0	Norway

St Orens, France

2004-05-05

Denmark	0–47	Germany

Villefranche-de-Lauragais, France

2004-05-08

Germany	0–30	Netherlands

Lalande Aucamville, France

2004-05-08

Denmark	5–8	Norway

Tournefeuille, France

== See also ==
- Women's international rugby
