= 2001 Women's Five Nations Championship =

Rugby union competition

- Date: 3 February 2001 - 8 April 2001
- Countries: England; Scotland; Wales; France; Spain

Tournament statistics
- Champions: England (5th title)
- Grand Slam: England (5th title)
- Triple Crown: England (5th title)
- Matches played: 10

The 2001 Women's Five Nations Championship was the third and final series of the rugby union Women's Five Nations Championship and was won by England, who achieved the Grand Slam. It should have been a six nations championship, but for the second year running Ireland withdrew from some fixtures.

== Final table ==
Pos	Team	Pld	W	D	L	PF	PA	PD	Pts
1	England	4	4	0	0	135	18	+117	8
2=	France	4	2	0	2	43	59	−16	4
2=	Spain	4	2	0	2	31	47	−16	4
4	Scotland	4	2	0	2	41	60	−19	4
5	Wales	4	0	0	4	3	69	−66	0

== Results ==
2001-02-03

France	13–0	Scotland

Saint Denis

2001-02-04

Wales	0–18	England

Newport

2001-02-18

England	28–12	Spain

Worcester

2001-02-18

Scotland	22–0	Wales

Meggetland

2001-03-03

Spain	6–0	France

Madrid

2001-03-04

England	39–0	Scotland

Richmond

2001-03-16

France	24–3	Wales

Nanterre

2001-03-18

Scotland	19–8	Spain

Melrose

2001-04-08

England	50–6	France

Northampton

2001-04-08

Wales	0–5	Spain

Wrexham

== See also ==
- Women's Six Nations Championship
- Women's international rugby
