= Vera, Spain =

Vera, Almería, Spain
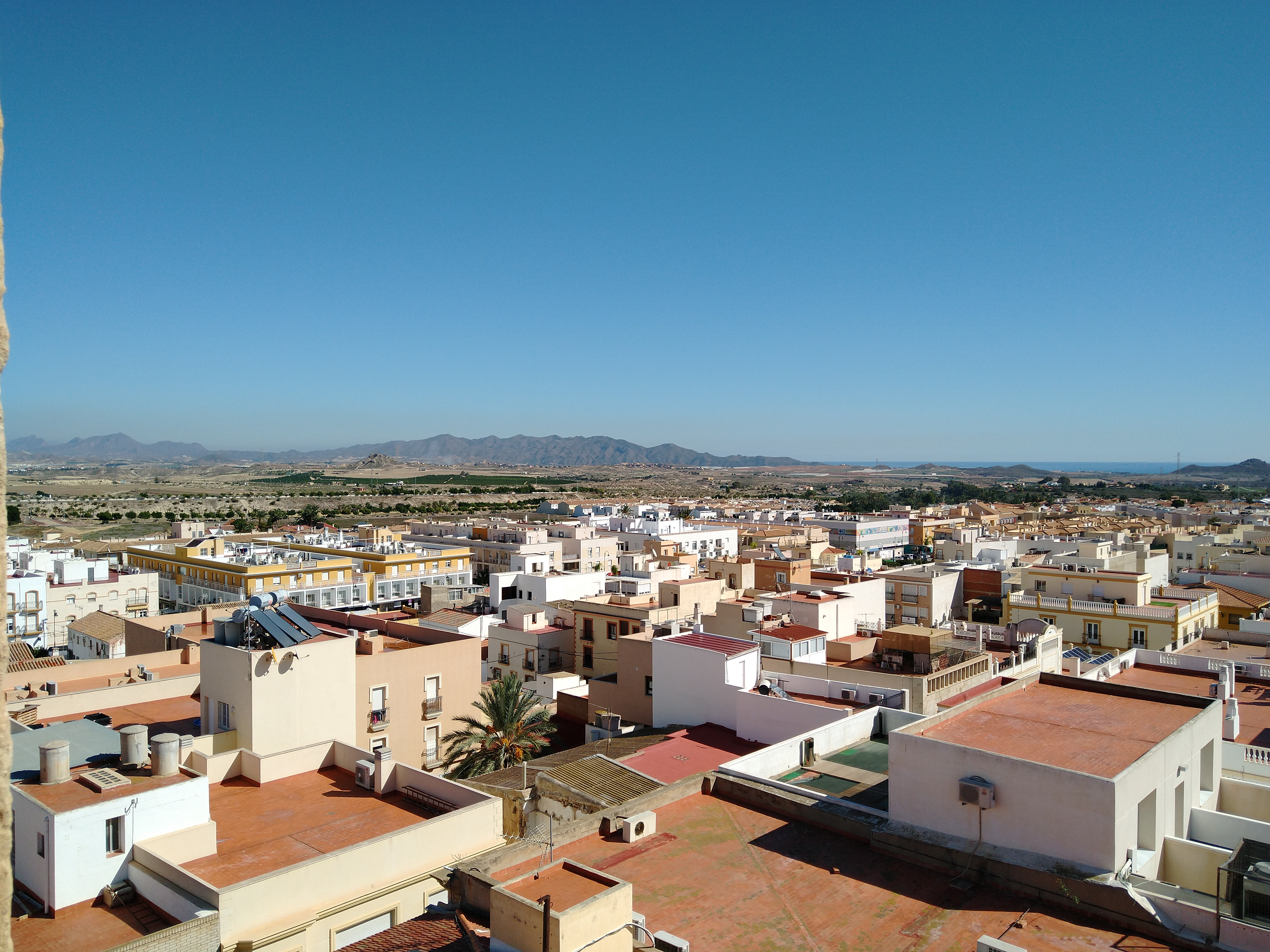
- General view

- Flag Coat of arms

- Location within Province of Almería Location within Andalusia Location within Spain
- Coordinates: 37°15′N 1°52′W
- Country: Spain
- Community: Andalusia
- Province: Almería

Government
  - Mayor: José Carmelo Jorge Blanco (Partido Popular PP)

Area
  - Total: 58 km^{2} (22 sq mi)
- Elevation: 97 m (318 ft)

Population (2025-01-01)
  - Total: 20,282
  - Density: 350/km^{2} (910/sq mi)
- Time zone: UTC+1 (CET)
  - Summer (DST): UTC+2 (CEST)

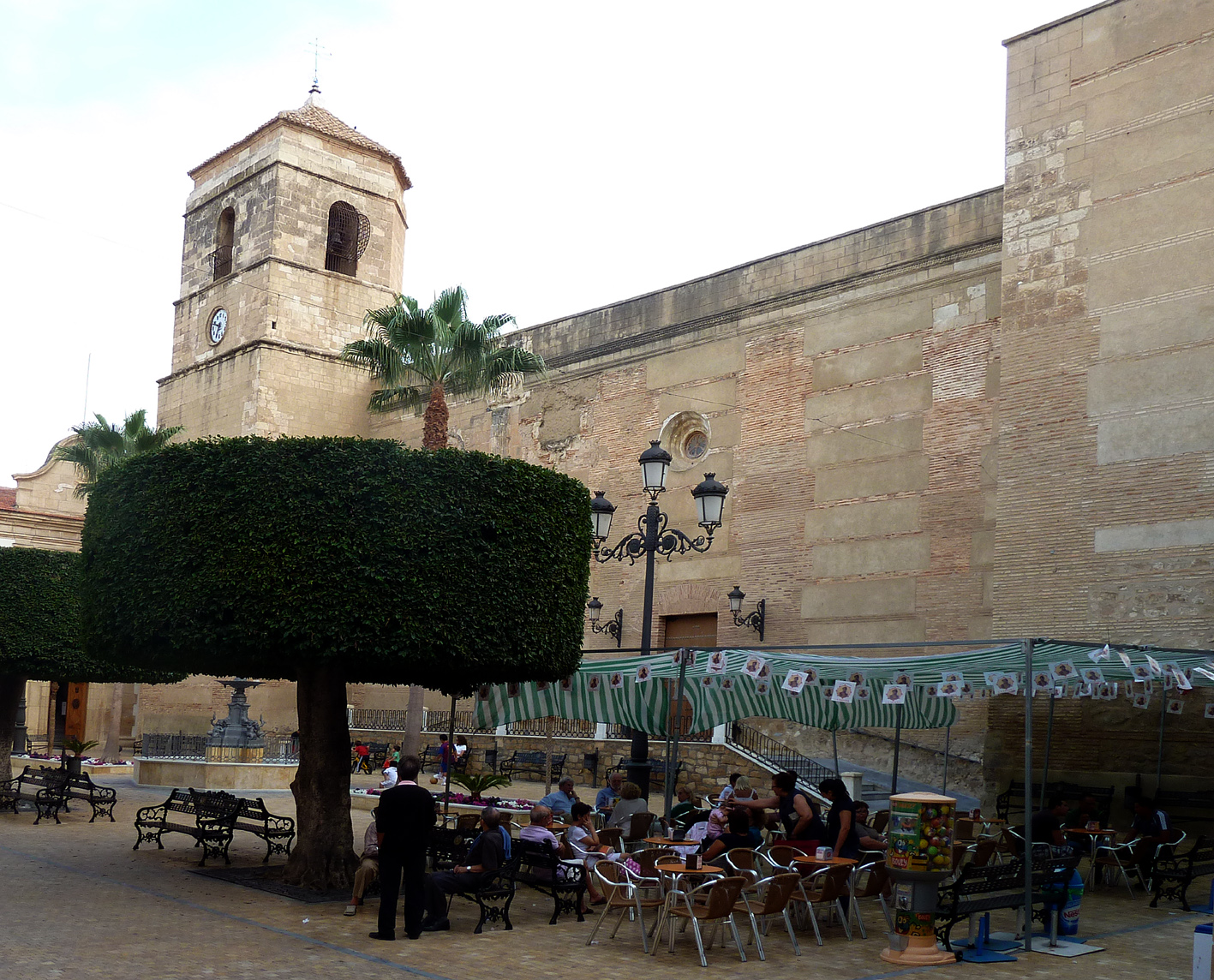
Fortified church of the Encarnación, as seen across the Central Square

Vera is a municipality of Almería province, in the autonomous community of Andalusia, Spain. Today Vera is one of the most important commercial centres in the region, with a thriving traditional core and a number of supermarkets and commercial organisations spread along the ring road. Vera itself lies approximately 10 kilometres (6.2 mi) inland from the coast, but the municipality extends to the sea shore. There, a tourist settlement, named Vera Playa, has been developed. This now forms the main economic activity of Vera. Since 1990, Vera Playa has developed into an important naturist village.

== History ==
The earliest Carthaginian, Roman and Muslim settlement was the city of Baria, by the sea near Villaricos. In 209 BC, Baria was conquered by the Romans during the Second Punic War. In Late Antiquity, it belonged to the Byzantine province of Spania and later to the Visigothic Kingdom. But in the unsettled times of the early Middle Ages the settlement was moved inland to the hill of Espíritu Santo but an earthquake destroyed it in 1518. Following the earthquake it was rebuilt on the site it currently occupies as a rectangular layout with eight towers and two gates. At the centre was the Parish Church of the Encarnación, built as a fortress to protect the village against Barbary pirates. In the late 19th century the town expanded due to mining activity in the region, but it subsequently declined until its recent development as a tourist centre.

== Demographics ==
Historical population
Year	Pop.	±%
1999	6,926	—
2000	6,930	+0.1%
2001	7,351	+6.1%
2002	7,970	+8.4%
2003	8,717	+9.4%
2004	9,504	+9.0%
2005	10,439	+9.8%
2011	14,689	+40.7%
2012	15,010	+2.2%
2013	15,424	+2.8%
2014	15,018	−2.6%
2015	15,108	+0.6%
2016	15,168	+0.4%
2017	15,528	+2.4%
2018	15,837	+2.0%
Source: INE (Spain)

== Vera Playa ==
Vera Playa is a long, wide beach with a large number of chiringuitos. There are many new neighborhoods in construction and the population is growing. The area receives many holiday-makers.

Vera Playa has a different postal code: 04621.

=== Naturism ===
The north of Vera Playa is known for its naturist area, one of the largest in Europe, with accommodation and nightlife. Since 1990, Vera Playa has developed into an important center for naturism (nudism). There are several apartment complexes, including Natsun, La Manera, Bahia de Vera and Vera Natura, where naturism is officially permitted. The naturist complex is completely open and there are good parking facilities. About 2 kilometres (1.2 mi) of beach have been reserved for naturists. The area of Vera Playa is a well known naturist area and includes one of Spain's naturist hotels (Vera Playa Club Hotel).

On 21 July 2013 a local group called Vera Playa Friends organized a Guinness World Record attempt at the largest ever skinny dip. 729 naturists entered the sea at El Playazo beach at 12:00 noon beating the previous record of 506 set in New Zealand the previous year. Vera Mayor José Carmelo Jorge called the mass nude swim a "tremendous success". The event was organised by Vera Playa Friends in association with Vera Town hall and Tourist Office, also heavily involved were the Spanish Naturist Federation and the day chosen was the "day without swimsuits" with hundreds of Spanish naturists flocking to the beach. A local charity for children suffering from disabilities benefited from the Guinness World Record crowds.

== See also ==
- List of municipalities in Almería
