= 1997 FIRA Women's European Championship =

1997 FIRA European Championship
Tournament details
- Host: France
- Dates: 2 April 1998– 6 April 1998
- Teams: 8

Final positions
- Champions: England
- Runner-up: Scotland

Tournament statistics
- Matches played: 12

The 1997 FIRA Women's European Championship was the third edition of the championship, it saw a significant expansion to eight teams, with three British entrants entering a FIRA event for the first time - and an all British final.

== Bracket ==
Quarter-finals
2 April – Nice
France | 58
Germany | 18
2 April – Nice
England | 40
Netherlands | 3
2 April – Nice
Spain | 27
Ireland | 0
2 April – Nice
Italy | 7
Scotland | 31

Semi-finals
4 April – Nice
France | 10
England | 15
4 April – Nice
Spain | 10
Scotland | 11

Final
6 April – Nice
England | 24
Scotland | 8
Third place
6 April – Nice
France | 8
Spain | 25

Semi-finals
4 April – Nice
Germany | 10
Netherlands | 32
4 April – Nice
Ireland | 5
Italy | 13

Final
6 April – Nice
Netherlands | 26
Italy | 24
Third place
6 April – Nice
Germany | 0
Ireland | 16

== First round ==
1997-04-02

| France | 58–18 | Germany |

Nice, France

1997-04-02

| England | 40–3 | Netherlands |

Nice, France

1997-04-02

| Spain | 27–0 | Ireland |

Nice, France

1997-04-02

| Italy | 7–31 | Scotland |

Nice, France

== Plate semi-finals ==
1997-04-04

| Italy | 13–5 | Ireland |

Nice, France

1997-04-04

| Netherlands | 32–10 | Germany |

Nice, France

== Semi-finals ==
1997-04-04

| France | 10–15 | England |

Nice, France

1997-04-04

| Scotland | 11–10 | Spain |

Nice, France

=== 7th/8th Place ===
1997-04-06

| Germany | 0–16 | Ireland |

Nice, France

=== Plate final ===
1997-04-06

| Italy | 24–26 | Netherlands |

Nice, France

=== 3rd/4th Place ===
1997-04-06

| France | 8–25 | Spain |

Nice, France

=== Final ===
1997-04-06

| England | 24–8 | Scotland |

Nice, France

== See also ==
- Women's international rugby union
