= Ireland women's national rugby union team =

Women's rugby union team representing the island of Ireland

Ireland
- Nickname: The Green Wave
- Emblem: Shamrock
- Union: Irish Rugby Football Union
- Head coach: Scott Bemand
- Captain: Edel McMahon; Sam Monaghan
- Home stadium: Virgin Media Park; RDS Arena; Affidea Stadium
First colours	Second colours

World Rugby ranking
- Current: 5 (as of 26 May 2025)
- Highest: 2 (11 August 2014)
- Lowest: 9 (2024)

First international
- Scotland 10–0 Ireland (Edinburgh, Scotland; 14 February 1993)

Biggest win
- Ireland 109–0 Kazakhstan (Dubai, United Arab Emirates; 13 October 2023)

Biggest defeat
- England 79–0 Ireland (Worcester, England; 17 February 2002)

World Cup
- Appearances: 8 (First in 1994)
- Best result: Fourth place (2014)
- Website: www.irishrugby.ie

The Ireland women's national rugby union team represents Ireland in international women's rugby union competitions such as the Women's Six Nations Championship and the Women's Rugby World Cup. They have also represented Ireland in the FIRA Women's European Championship. Ireland won the 2013 and 2015 Women's Six Nations Championships. In 2013 they also achieved both a Triple Crown and Grand Slam. They finished fourth in the 2014 Women's Rugby World Cup after defeating New Zealand in the pool stages. Ireland hosted the 2017 Women's Rugby World Cup. The team was part of the by the Irish Women's Rugby Football Union (IWRFU). In 2009, the women were taken on by the Irish Rugby Football Union.

== History ==
=== Early years ===
The Irish Women's Rugby Football Union was established in 1992. Ireland made their international debut on 14 February 1993 with an away friendly against Scotland. This was also Scotland's first international. The match was played at Raeburn Place in front of a crowd of over 1,000. The Ireland team was coached by Alain Rolland while the Scotland coaches included Sandy Carmichael. Scotland won 10–0 with two tries from their captain, Sandra Colamartino. Ireland's first captain was Jill Henderson. A year later, on 14 February 1994, Ireland made their home international debut when a return match was played at Ravenhill. This time Scotland won 5–0. In 2001 the IWRFU became affiliated to the Irish Rugby Football Union, in 2008 it effectively merged with the IRFU and since 2009 the IRFU has managed the women's national team.

=== Rugby World Cup ===
Ireland have competed in every Women's Rugby World Cup since making their debut in the second tournament in 1994. They made their World Cup debut on 13 April 1994 with an 18–5 win against a Scottish Students XV. This was also Ireland's first competitive match in any competition.

Ireland's best performance at a World Cup tournament came in 2014 when they finished fourth after defeating New Zealand and winning Pool B. After defeating the United States 23–17 in their opening pool game, Ireland faced New Zealand, the 2010 Women's Rugby World Cup winners in their second game. With tries from Heather O'Brien and Alison Miller and two conversions and a penalty from Niamh Briggs, Ireland defeated New Zealand 17–14. It was just the second match New Zealand had lost in a World Cup tournament. It was the first time the Ireland women had played New Zealand and they became only the second Irish team, after Munster in 1978, to defeat a New Zealand national rugby union team. The result has been described as "one of the biggest upsets in the tournament's history". Ireland subsequently qualified for the semi-finals with a 40–5 win against Kazakhstan. Ireland eventually finished fourth in the tournament after losing 18–25 to France in the third place play-off.

They failed to qualify for the 2022 Rugby World Cup, after ending in third place of the qualifying round of September 2021 in Italy.

=== Six Nations Championship ===
Ireland made their debut in the Women's Six Nations Championship, then known as the Women's Home Nations Championship, in the inaugural 1996 competition. They played their first game against Scotland on 21 January 1996. During the 1990s and early 2000s, Ireland never challenged for the championship. They regularly finished in the wooden spoon position at the bottom of the table. Before winning their first championship in 2013, the highest position they ever finished in the competition was third. They did not enter in 2000 and 2001 and were replaced by Spain. When Ireland returned in 2002, the competition became known as the Six Nations for the first time. In 2002 Ireland also suffered their biggest ever defeat when they lost 79–0 to England. Ireland won their first Six Nations match in 2005 when they defeated Wales 11–6. Ireland defeated Scotland for the first time on 10 March 2007 with an 18–6 win at Meggetland. In 2009 Ireland defeated France for the first time.

Ireland won their first championship in 2013, winning both a Triple Crown and a Grand Slam at the same time. In their opening match of the campaign, Ireland beat Wales 12–10. Then on 9 February 2013 they defeated England for the first time. Alison Miller scored a hat-trick of tries as Ireland won 25–0. On 23 February 2013 they clinched their first Triple Crown with a 30–3 win against Scotland. On 8 March 2013 Ireland effectively won the championship after they defeated France 15–10. It was confirmed the following day after Italy failed to defeat England. Ireland eventually finished four points clear of runners-up France. Ireland secured the Grand Slam with a 6–3 away win against Italy on Saint Patrick's Day. Two penalties from Niamh Briggs gave Ireland their fifth win in a row.

In 2015, Ireland won their second championship and second Triple Crown in three years. They won the championship on points difference over France, after both teams had won four of their five matches. Ireland had to win their final game, against Scotland, by a margin of 27 points or more to win the title and achieved this with a 73–3 win. The result is also Ireland's biggest ever win.

=== FIRA Women's European Championship ===
Ireland has also competed in the FIRA Women's European Championship. They first played in the tournament in 1997. Their best performance in this tournament was a third-place finish in 2008. In 2004 they won the Plate competition after defeating Spain 20–12 in the final.

== Players ==
See List of Ireland women's national rugby union players

=== Current squad ===
Squad for WXV Global Series Tour of South Africa. Games to be played at Athlone Stadium in Cape Town on Saturday, 24 October and Saturday, 31 October.

Caps updated to after match vs South Africa, 31 October 2026

Player	Position	Caps	Date of Birth	Club/Province
Eilís Cahill	Prop	9	15 January 2002	Munster Rugby
Linda Djougang	Prop	62	17 May 1996	Leinster Rugby
Niamh O'Dowd	Prop	27	21 April 2000	(England) Gloucester–Hartpury
Sadhbh McGrath	Prop	25	30 August 2004	Ulster Rugby
Sophie Barrett	Prop	2	27 January 2004	Ulster Rugby
Beth Buttimer	Hooker	4	18 August 2005	Munster Rugby
India Daley	Hooker	0		Ulster Rugby
Neve Jones	Hooker	51	26 December 1998	(England) Gloucester–Hartpury
Fiona Tuite O'Sullivan	Lock	29	27 December 1996	Ulster Rugby
Jemima Adams-Verling	Lock	5	11 July 2006	Connacht Rugby
Kate Jordan	Lock	2	1 May 2001	Leinster Rugby
Jane Clohessy	Lock	5	28 December 1998	Munster Rugby
Alma Atagamen	Lock	0		Leinster Rugby
Brittany Hogan	Back Row	48	19 September 1998	(England) Sale Sharks
Dorothy Wall	Back Row	46	4 May 2000	(England) Exeter Chiefs
Erin King	Back Row	17	21 October 2003	Leinster Rugby
Grace Moore	Back Row	32	21 May 1996	Munster Rugby
Aoibheann Reilly	Scrum Half	24	1 November 2000	Connacht Rugby
Emily Lane	Scrum Half	30	10 January 1999	Munster Rugby
Enya Breen	Fly Half	34	23 April 1999	Munster Rugby
Dannah O'Brien	Fly Half	40	22 September 2003	Leinster Rugby
Alana McInerney	Wing	1	22 June 2001	Munster Rugby
Anna McGann	Wing	22	4 June 1998	Connacht Rugby
Aoife Dalton	Centre	38	3 May 2003	Leinster Rugby
Eve Higgins	Centre	41	23 June 1999	Leinster Rugby
Vicky Elmes Kinlan	Wing	8	21 February 2003	Leinster Rugby
Béibhinn Parsons	Wing	40	30 November 2001	Connacht Rugby
Robyn O'Connor	Wing	8	15 July 2005	Leinster Rugby
Stacey Flood	Full Back	33	5 August 1996	Leinster Rugby
Niamh Gallagher	Full Back	5	22 November 2005	(England) Trailfinders

=== Recent Call-Ups ===
The following players were also named to a squad in the last 12 months.

Player	Position	Caps	Date of Birth	Club/Province	Last Call-Up
Cliodhna Moloney-MacDonald	Hooker	55	31 May 1993	(England) Exeter Chiefs	2026 WXV Global Series^{INJ}
Ruth Campbell	Back Row	17	27 June 2003	Leinster Rugby	2026 WXV Global Series^{INJ}
Sam Monaghan	Lock	31	25 June 1993	(England) Gloucester–Hartpury	2026 WXV Global Series^{INJ}
Olivia McKinley	Lock	0		Ulster Rugby	2026 WXV Global Series
Caitríona Finn	Fly Half	0	4 June 2006	Munster Rugby	2026 WXV Global Series
Lucia Linn	Centre	0	13 July 2005	Munster Rugby	2026 WXV Global Series
Katie Whelan	Scrum Half	5	27 February 2003	Leinster Rugby	2026 WXV Global Series
Ellena Perry	Prop	9	12 April 1997	Retired	2026 Six Nations^{RET}
Aoibheann McGrath	Lock	0		Munster Rugby	2026 Six Nations
Nancy McGillivray	Centre	6	15 November 2002	(England) Exeter Chiefs	2026 Six Nations

=== Award winners ===
==== World Rugby Awards ====
The following Ireland players have been recognised at the World Rugby Awards since 2001:

World Rugby Player of the Year
Year	Nominees	Winners
2014	Niamh Briggs	—
2015	Sophie Spence	—

World Rugby Breakthrough Player of the Year
Year	Nominees	Winners
2024	Erin King	Erin King

World Rugby Dream Team of the Year
Year	No.	Players
2024	6.	Aoife Wafer

==== Six Nations Awards ====
The following Ireland players have been recognised in the Women's Six Nations Awards since 2020:

Six Nations Team of the Championship
Year	Forwards		Backs		Total
Year	No.	Players	No.	Players	Total
2022	1.	Linda Djougang	13.	Eve Higgins	4
2022	2.	Neve Jones	13.	Eve Higgins	4
2022	5.	Sam Monaghan	13.	Eve Higgins	4
2023	—				0
2024	2.	Neve Jones (2)	—		2
2024	6.	Aoife Wafer	—		2
2025	2.	Neve Jones (3)	12.	Aoife Dalton	3
2025	6.	Aoife Wafer (2)	12.	Aoife Dalton	3
2026	6.	Erin King	12.	Aoife Dalton (2)	3
2026	6.	Aoife Wafer (3)	12.	Aoife Dalton (2)	3

Six Nations Player of the Championship
Year	Nominees	Winners
2024	Aoife Wafer	—
2025	Aoife Wafer (2)	Aoife Wafer
2026	Aoife Wafer (3)	Aoife Wafer (2)

Six Nations Try of the Championship
Year	Nominee	Match	Winner	Ref
2025	Anna McGann	vs. Italy	—	
2026	Béibhinn Parsons	vs. Italy	—	

== Records ==
Women's World Rugby Rankings Top 20 rankings as of 6 April 2026
Rank	Change*	Team	Points
1	Steady	England	98.09
2	Steady	Canada	91.53
3	Steady	New Zealand	89.85
4	Steady	France	83.60
5	Steady	Ireland	78.20
6	Steady	Scotland	77.39
7	Steady	Australia	75.46
8	Steady	United States	72.90
9	Steady	Italy	72.37
10	Steady	South Africa	71.62
11	Steady	Japan	69.72
12	Steady	Wales	66.13
13	Steady	Fiji	63.98
14	Steady	Spain	62.42
15	Steady	Samoa	59.72
16	Steady	Hong Kong	57.56
17	Steady	Netherlands	57.42
18	Steady	Russia	55.10
19	Steady	Kazakhstan	53.88
20	▲1	Germany	51.10
*Change from the previous week

=== Overall ===
See List of Ireland women's national rugby union team matches

Full internationals only

Correct as of 31 August 2025

Against	First game	Played	Won	Drawn	Lost	Win %
Australia	1998	5	2	0	3	40%
Canada	2002	5	1	0	4	20%
Colombia	2023	1	1	0	0	100.00%
England	1996	33	2	0	31	6.06%
France	1993	33	3	1	29	9.09%
Germany	1997	3	3	0	0	100.00%
Italy	1997	24	20	0	4	83.33%
Japan	1994	8	6	0	2	75%
Kazakhstan	1998	6	3	0	3	57.14%
Netherlands	1998	3	3	0	0	100.00%
New Zealand	2014	3	2	0	1	66.67%
Samoa	2002	1	0	0	1	0.00%
Scotland	1993	35	17	0	18	48.57%
South Africa	2006	1	1	0	0	100.00%
Spain	1997	12	6	0	6	54.55%
United States	1994	9	4	0	5	44.44%
Wales	1996	33	15	0	18	45.45%
Total	1993	215	89	1	125	41.4%

=== World Cup ===
Rugby World Cup
Year	Round	Position	GP	W	D	L	PF	PA
(Wales) 1991	Did not compete							
(Scotland) 1994	7th place playoff	7th	5	2	0	3	32	125
(Netherlands) 1998	Bowl final	10th	5	2	0	3	57	82
(Spain) 2002	13th place playoff	14th	4	1	0	3	18	97
(Canada) 2006	7th place playoff	8th	5	1	0	4	72	96
(England) 2010	7th place playoff	7th	5	3	0	2	94	90
(France) 2014	3rd place playoff	4th	5	3	0	2	105	101
(Ireland) 2017	7th place playoff	8th	5	2	0	3	89	115
(New Zealand) 2021	Did not qualify							
(England) 2025	Knockout stage	—	4	2	0	2	98	99
(Australia) 2029	TBD							
(United States) 2033	TBD							
Total	8/10	4th^{†}	38	16	0	22	565	805
Champions Runners-up Third place Fourth place: * Tied placing ^{†} Best placing / Home venue

=== Six Nations ===
	England	France	Ireland	Italy	Scotland	Spain	Wales
Tournaments	31	28	29	20	31	7	31
Outright Wins	22	6	2	0	1	0	0
Grand Slams	20	5	1	0	1	0	0
Triple Crowns	26	—N/a	2	—N/a	1	—N/a	1
Wooden Spoons	0	0	6	3	9	2	10

== Head coaches ==
Coach	Years
Alain Rolland	1993
Johnnie Neary	1998
Philip Doyle	2003–2006
John O'Sullivan	2006–2008
Steven Hennessy	2009–2010
Kevin West	2010–2012
Philip Doyle	2012–2014
Tom Tierney	2014–2017
Adam Griggs	2017–2021
Greg McWilliams	2021–2023
Scott Bemand	2023–

== Honours ==
- Women's Six Nations Championship
  - Winners: 2013, 2015
- Grand Slam
  - Winners: 2013
- Triple Crown
  - Winners: 2013, 2015
- WXV
  - WXV3 Winners: 2023
- FIRA Women's European Championship Plate
  - Winners: 2004
