= 2016 Women's Six Nations Championship =

- Date: 5 February – 20 March 2016
- Countries: England; France; Ireland; Italy; Scotland; Wales

Tournament statistics
- Champions: France (5th title)
- Triple Crown: England (17th title)
- Matches played: 15
- Attendance: 39,732 (2,649 per match)
- Tries scored: 66 (4.4 per match)
- Top point scorer: (Ireland) Niamh Briggs (38)
- Top try scorer: (France) Audrey Forlani (4)
- Official website: Official website

The 2016 Women's Six Nations Championship, also known as the 2016 RBS Women's Six Nations due to the tournament's sponsorship by the Royal Bank of Scotland, was the 15th series of the Women's Six Nations Championship, an annual women's rugby union competition featuring six European rugby union national teams. Matches were played in February and March 2016, on the same weekends as the men's tournament. France won the championship after beating England in their final game. France and England were tied on eight table points each after winning four games, France took the title on the points difference tie-breaker.

== Participants ==
Nation	Stadium			Head coach	Captain
Nation	Home stadium	Capacity	Location	Head coach	Captain
England	Twickenham Stadium	82,500	London	(England) Scott Bemand	Sarah Hunter
England	Twickenham Stoop	14,800	London	(England) Scott Bemand	Sarah Hunter
France	Stade Marcel-Verchère	11,400	Bourg-en-Bresse	(France) Jean-Michel Gonzalez	Gaëlle Mignot
France	Stade Aimé Giral	16,593	Perpignan	(France) Jean-Michel Gonzalez	Gaëlle Mignot
France	Stade de la Rabine	9,500	Vannes	(France) Jean-Michel Gonzalez	Gaëlle Mignot
Ireland	Donnybrook Stadium	6,000	Dublin	(Ireland) Tom Tierney	Niamh Briggs
Italy	Stadio Gino Pistoni	3,500	Ivrea	(Italy) Andrea Di Giandomenico	Sara Barattin
Italy	Stadio Arcoveggio	2,000	Bologna	(Italy) Andrea Di Giandomenico	Sara Barattin
Scotland	Broadwood Stadium	7,936	Cumbernauld	(Scotland) Shade Munro	Lisa Martin
Wales	The Gnoll	5,000	Neath	(Wales) Rhys Edwards	Rachel Taylor
Wales	Talbot Athletic Ground	3,000	Port Talbot	(Wales) Rhys Edwards	Rachel Taylor

== Table ==
Position	Nation	Games				Points			Table points
Position	Nation	Played	Won	Drawn	Lost	For	Against	Difference	Table points
1	France	5	4	0	1	106	28	+78	8
2	England	5	4	0	1	110	63	+47	8
3	Ireland	5	3	0	2	95	49	+46	6
4	Wales	5	2	0	3	61	75	–14	4
5	Italy	5	2	0	3	65	105	–40	4
6	Scotland	5	0	0	5	29	146	–117	0

== Fixtures and results ==
=== Week 1 ===
Test: 1136	5 February 2016	Scotland	0–32	England	Broadwood Stadium, Cumbernauld
	18:00 GMT (UTC+0)		Report; SRU Report	Try: Lauren Cattell 26' m Harriet Millar-Mills (2) 34' c, 48' m Sarah Hunter 55' m Lucy Demaine 76' c Con: Amber Reed 34'; Lauren Cattell 76'; Pen: Amber Reed 39'	Attendance: 500; Referee: Jess Beard (New Zealand)

FB	15	Chloe Rollie
RW	14	Megan Gaffney
OC	13	Hannah Smith
IC	12	Lisa Thomson
LW	11	Rhona Lloyd
FH	10	Lisa Martin (c)
SH	9	Sarah Law
N8	8	Jade Konkel
OF	7	Karen Dunbar
BF	6	Jemma Forsyth
RL	5	Deborah McCormack
LL	4	Emma Wassell
TP	3	Lindsey Smith
HK	2	Lana Skeldon
LP	1	Tracy Balmer
Replacements:
HK	16	Sarah Quick
PR	17	Debbie Falconer
PR	18	Heather Lockhart
LK	19	Fiona Sim
FL	20	Anna Stodter
SH	21	Jenny Maxwell
CE	22	Lauren Harris
WG	23	Eilidh Sinclair
Coach:
(Scotland) Shade Munro

FB	15	Katie Mason
RW	14	Ruth Laybourn
OC	13	Lauren Cattell
IC	12	Ceri Large
LW	11	Lotte Clapp
FH	10	Amber Reed
SH	9	La Toya Mason
N8	8	Sarah Hunter (c)
OF	7	Izzy Noel-Smith
BF	6	Harriet Millar-Mills
RL	5	Emily Braund
LL	4	Abbie Scott
TP	3	Victoria Cornborough
HK	2	Amy Cokayne
LP	1	Rochelle Clark
Replacements:
HK	16	Heather Kerr
PR	17	Emma Croker
PR	18	Bee Dawson
LK	19	Courtney Gill
FL	20	Poppy Cleall
SH	21	Bianca Blackburn
FH	22	Lucy Demaine	Substituted in
CE	23	Leanne Riley
Coach:
(England) Scott Bemand

Test: 1137	6 February 2016	Ireland	21–3	Wales	Donnybrook Stadium, Dublin
	13:00 GMT (UTC+0)	Try: Sene Naoupu 25' c Sophie Spence 36' m Con: Niamh Briggs 25'; Pen: Niamh Briggs (3) 6', 44', 64'	Report; IRFU Report	Pen: Robyn Wilkins 4'	Attendance: 3,262; Referee: Leah Berard (United States)

FB	15	Niamh Briggs (c)
RW	14	Elise O'Byrne-White
OC	13	Aine Donnelly	(substituted off) 66'
IC	12	Sene Naoupu
LW	11	Mairead Coyne
FH	10	Nikki Caughey	39' to 40'		(substituted off) 58'
SH	9	Larissa Muldoon	(substituted off) 74'
N8	8	Heather O'Brien	(substituted off) 58'
OF	7	Claire Molloy
BF	6	Paula Fitzpatrick
RL	5	Marie Louise Reilly	(substituted off) 66'
LL	4	Sophie Spence
TP	3	Ruth O'Reilly	(substituted off) 70'
HK	2	Zoe Grattage	(substituted off) 50'
LP	1	Ailis Egan	58' to 61'		(substituted off) 77'
Replacements:
HK	16	Cliodhna Moloney	(substituted in) 50'
PR	17	Lindsay Peat	(substituted in) 70'
PR	18	Fiona Reidy	(substituted in) 58'	(substituted off) 61'	(substituted in) 77'
LK	19	Ciara Cooney	(substituted in) 66'
FL	20	Ciara Griffin	(substituted in) 58'
SH	21	Mary Healy	(substituted in) 74'
CE	22	Nora Stapleton	(substituted in) 39'	(substituted off) 40'	(substituted in) 58'
WG	23	Jackie Shiels	(substituted in) 66'
Coach:
(Ireland) Tom Tierney

FB	15	Adi Taviner
RW	14	Elen Evans
OC	13	Kerin Lake		(substituted off) 32'
IC	12	Hannah Jones		(substituted off) 51'
LW	11	Bethan Dainton		(substituted off) 20'	(substituted in) 29'	(substituted off) 66'
FH	10	Robyn Wilkins
SH	9	Keira Bevan
N8	8	Shona Powell Hughes		(substituted off) 44'
OF	7	Sian Williams
BF	6	Rachel Taylor (c)
RL	5	Sioned Harries
LL	4	Rebecca Rowe		(substituted off) 54'
TP	3	Amy Evans		(substituted off) 58'
HK	2	Carys Phillips		(substituted off) 73'
LP	1	Megan York	(yellow card) 19' to 29'	(substituted off) 73'
Replacements:
HK	16	Amy Price		(substituted in) 73'
PR	17	Catrin Edwards		(substituted in) 20'	(substituted off) 29'	(substituted in) 58'
PR	18	Cerys Hale		(substituted in) 73'
LK	19	Siwan Lillicrap		(substituted in) 54'
FL	20	Alisha Butchers		(substituted in) 44'
SH	21	Elinor Snowsill		(substituted in) 51'
CE	22	Gemma Rowland		(substituted in) 32'
WG	23	Dyddgu Hywel		(substituted in) 66'
Coach:
(Wales) Rhys Edwards

Test: 1138	6 February 2016	France	39–0	Italy	Stade Marcel-Verchère, Bourg-en-Bresse
	21:00 CET (UTC+1)	Try: Julie Billes 4' m Audrey Forlani (2) 16' m, 62' c Gaëlle Mignot 24' c Penalty try 50' c Élodie Poublan 72' m Con: Audrey Abadie (3) 24', 50', 62'; Pen: Audrey Abadie 33'	Report; FIR Report (in Italian)		Attendance: 7,000; Referee: Sara Cox (England)

FB	15	Julie Billes	(substituted off) 67'
RW	14	Caroline Boujard
OC	13	Lucille Godiveau
IC	12	Élodie Poublan
LW	11	Laura Delas
FH	10	Audrey Abadie	(substituted off) 65'
SH	9	Yanna Rivoalen	(substituted off) 60'
N8	8	Safi N'Diaye
OF	7	Pauline Rayssac	(substituted off) 59'
BF	6	Coumba Tombe Diallo
RL	5	Audrey Forlani
LL	4	Céline Ferer	(substituted off) 51'
TP	3	Julie Duval	(substituted off) 25'
HK	2	Gaëlle Mignot (c)	(substituted off) 65'
LP	1	Lise Arricastre	(substituted off) 65'
Replacements:
HK	16	Agathe Sochat	(substituted in) 65'
PR	17	Maylis Traore Dhia	(substituted in) 65'
LK	18	Romane Menager	(substituted in) 51'
FL	19	Julie Annery	(substituted in) 59'
CE	20	Laure Sansus	(substituted in) 60'
FB	21	Camille Imart	(substituted in) 65'
WG	22	Coralie Bertrand	(substituted in) 67'
PR	23	Patricia Carricaburu	(substituted in) 25'
Coach:
(France) Jean-Michel Gonzalez

FB	15	Manuela Furlan
RW	14	Michela Sillari
OC	13	Maria Grazia Cioffi
IC	12	Beatrice Rigoni
LW	11	Sofia Stefan
FH	10	Veronica Schiavon		(substituted off) 56'
SH	9	Sara Barattin (c)
N8	8	Elisa Giordano
OF	7	Michela Este		(substituted off) 60'
BF	6	Ilaria Arrighetti		(substituted off) 67'
RL	5	Alice Trevisan
LL	4	Isabella Locatelli
TP	3	Lucia Gai		(substituted off) 54'
HK	2	Melissa Bettoni
LP	1	Elisa Cucchiella	(yellow card) 68' to 78'
Replacements:
HK	16	Lucia Cammarano		(substituted in) 54'
PR	17	Gaia Giacomoli		(substituted in) 67'
PR	18	Nicoletti Diletta
LK	19	Valentina Ruzza
FL	20	Elisa Pillotti		(substituted in) 60'
CE	21	Silvia Folli
CE	22	Paola Zangirolami		(substituted in) 56'
WG	23	Maria Magatti
Coach:
(Italy) Andrea Di Giandomenico

=== Week 2 ===
Test: 1139	13 February 2016	Italy	24–33	England	Stadio Gino Pistoni, Ivrea
	15:00 CET (UTC+1)	Try: Maria Grazia Cioffi 1' c Sofia Stefan 28' m Elisa Giordano 43'm Michela Este 64' c Con: Veronica Schiavon (2) 1', 64'	Report; FIR Report (in Italian)	Try: Lauren Cattell 6' c Katie Mason 18' c Lotte Clapp 38' m Abbie Scott 59' c Bianca Blackburn 61' c Con: Amber Reed (3) 6', 18', 59'; Lauren Cattell 61'	Attendance: 2,800; Referee: Leah Berard (United States)

FB	15	Manuela Furlan
RW	14	Michela Sillari	(substituted off) 62'
OC	13	Maria Grazia Cioffi
IC	12	Beatrice Rigoni	(substituted off) 65'
LW	11	Sofia Stefan
FH	10	Veronica Schiavon
SH	9	Sara Barattin (c)
N8	8	Elisa Giordano
OF	7	Isabella Locatelli
BF	6	Ilaria Arrighetti	(substituted off) 19'
RL	5	Alice Trevisan
LL	4	Elisa Pillotti	(substituted off) 55'
TP	3	Melissa Bettoni
HK	2	Lucia Cammarano
LP	1	Elisa Cucchiella	(substituted off) 52'
Replacements:
HK	16	Lucia Gai	(substituted in) 52'
PR	17	Gaia Giacomoli
PR	18	Nicoletti Diletta
LK	19	Valentina Ruzza	(substituted in) 55'
FL	20	Michela Este	(substituted in) 19'
CE	21	Silvia Folli
CE	22	Paola Zangirolami	(substituted in) 65'
WG	23	Maria Magatti	(substituted in) 62'
Coach:
(Italy) Andrea Di Giandomenico

FB	15	Katie Mason	(substituted off) 76'
RW	14	Ruth Laybourn	(substituted off) 52'
OC	13	Lauren Cattell
IC	12	Ceri Large
LW	11	Lotte Clapp
FH	10	Amber Reed	(substituted off) 59'
SH	9	La Toya Mason
N8	8	Sarah Hunter (c)	(substituted off) 69'
OF	7	Izzy Noel-Smith
BF	6	Harriet Millar-Mills
RL	5	Emily Braund
LL	4	Abbie Scott
TP	3	Victoria Cornborough
HK	2	Amy Cokayne	(substituted off) 52'
LP	1	Rochelle Clark	(substituted off) 72'
Replacements:
HK	16	Emma Croker	(substituted in) 52'
PR	17	Heather Kerr	(substituted in) 72'
PR	18	Bee Dawson
LK	19	Poppy Leitch
FL	20	Poppy Cleall	(substituted in) 69'
SH	21	Bianca Blackburn	(substituted in) 59'
FH	22	Leanne Riley	(substituted in) 76'
CE	23	Lydia Thompson	(substituted in) 52'
Coach:
(England) Scott Bemand

Test: 1140	13 February 2016	France	18–6	Ireland	Stade Aimé Giral, Perpignan
	21:00 CET (UTC+1)	Try: Gaëlle Mignot 21' m Caroline Boujard 24' c Con: Audrey Abadie 24'; Pen: Audrey Abadie 6'; Laura Delas 70'	Report; IRFU Report	Pen: Niamh Briggs (2) 15', 33'	Attendance: 11,170; Referee: Jess Beard (New Zealand)

FB	15	Julie Billes	(substituted off) 34'
RW	14	Caroline Boujard
OC	13	Lucille Godiveau
IC	12	Élodie Poublan
LW	11	Laura Delas
FH	10	Audrey Abadie	(substituted off) 64'
SH	9	Yanna Rivoalen	(substituted off) 58'
N8	8	Safi N'Diaye
OF	7	Pauline Rayssac	(substituted off) 61'
BF	6	Laëtitia Grand
RL	5	Audrey Forlani	(substituted off) 54'
LL	4	Céline Ferer
TP	3	Julie Duval	(substituted off) 58'
HK	2	Gaëlle Mignot (c)	(substituted off) 74'
LP	1	Lise Arricastre	(substituted off) 52'
Replacements:
HK	16	Agathe Sochat	(substituted in) 74'
PR	17	Arkya Ait Labib	(substituted in) 52'
LK	18	Romane Menager	(substituted in) 54'
FL	19	Julie Annery	(substituted in) 61'
CE	20	Laure Sansus	(substituted in) 58'
FB	21	Camille Imart	(substituted in) 64'
WG	22	Coralie Bertrand	(substituted in) 34'
PR	23	Patricia Carricaburu	(substituted in) 58'
Coach:
(France) Jean-Michel Gonzalez

FB	15	Niamh Briggs (c)
RW	14	Elise O'Byrne-White
OC	13	Aine Donnelly	(substituted off) 66'
IC	12	Sene Naoupu
LW	11	Mairead Coyne
FH	10	Nikki Caughey	(substituted off) 66'
SH	9	Larissa Muldoon	(substituted off) 66'
N8	8	Heather O'Brien	(substituted off) 48'
OF	7	Claire Molloy	36' to 40'		(substituted off) 56'
BF	6	Paula Fitzpatrick
RL	5	Marie Louise Reilly
LL	4	Sophie Spence
TP	3	Ailis Egan	(substituted off) 74'
HK	2	Cliodhna Moloney	(substituted off) 70'
LP	1	Ruth O'Reilly	(substituted off) 48'
Replacements:
HK	16	Zoe Grattage	(substituted in) 70'
PR	17	Lindsay Peat	(substituted in) 48'
PR	18	Fiona Reidy	(substituted in) 74'
LK	19	Ciara Cooney	(substituted in) 56'
FL	20	Ciara Griffin	(substituted in) 36'	(substituted off) 40'	(substituted in) 48'
SH	21	Mary Healy	(substituted in) 66'
CE	22	Nora Stapleton	(substituted in) 66'
WG	23	Jackie Shiels	(substituted in) 66'
Coach:
(Ireland) Tom Tierney

Test: 1141	14 February 2016	Wales	23–10	Scotland	The Gnoll, Neath
	14:00 GMT (UTC+0)	Try: Sioned Harries 7' c Hannah Jones 35' m Alisha Butchers 57' m Con: Robyn Wilkins 7'; Pen: Robyn Wilkins (2) 15', 54'	Report	Try: Megan Gaffney 30' c Con: Lana Skeldon 30'; Pen: Lana Skeldon 5'	Referee: Claire Hodnett (England)

FB	15	Dyddgu Hywel
RW	14	Adi Taviner
OC	13	Hannah Jones
IC	12	Robyn Wilkins
LW	11	Elen Evans
FH	10	Elinor Snowsill
SH	9	Keira Bevan
N8	8	Sioned Harries
OF	7	Alisha Butchers
BF	6	Sian Williams
RL	5	Siwan Lillicrap
LL	4	Rebecca Rowe
TP	3	Amy Evans
HK	2	Carys Phillips (c)
LP	1	Megan York
Replacements:
HK	16	Amy Price
PR	17	Catrin Edwards
PR	18	Cerys Hale
LK	19	Jenny Hawkins
FL	20	Shona Powell Hughes
SH	21	Bethan Dainton
CE	22	Gemma Rowland
WG	23	Melissa Clay
Coach:
(Wales) Rhys Edwards

FB	15	Chloe Rollie
RW	14	Lauren Harris
OC	13	Megan Gaffney
IC	12	Lisa Thomson
LW	11	Rhona Lloyd
FH	10	Lisa Martin (c)
SH	9	Sarah Law
N8	8	Jade Konkel
OF	7	Karen Dunbar
BF	6	Jemma Forsyth
RL	5	Deborah McCormack
LL	4	Emma Wassell
TP	3	Lindsey Smith
HK	2	Lana Skeldon
LP	1	Tracy Balmer
Replacements:
HK	16	Sarah Quick
PR	17	Debbie Falconer
PR	18	Heather Lockhart
LK	19	Fiona Sim
FL	20	Anna Stodter
SH	21	Jenny Maxwell
CE	22	Abigail Evans
WG	23	Eilidh Sinclair
Coach:
(Scotland) Shade Munro

=== Week 3 ===
Test: 1142	27 February 2016	England	13–9	Ireland	Twickenham Stadium, London
	19:15 GMT (UTC+0)	Try: Emma Croker 22' m Abbie Scott 63' m Pen: Amber Reed 5'	Report; IRFU Report	Pen: Niamh Briggs (3) 36', 40', 48'	Attendance: 2,500; Referee: Alhambra Nievas (Spain)

FB	15	Katie Mason
RW	14	Lydia Thompson		(substituted off) 69'
OC	13	Lauren Cattell
IC	12	Ceri Large
LW	11	Lotte Clapp
FH	10	Amber Reed
SH	9	La Toya Mason		(substituted off) 48'
N8	8	Sarah Hunter (c)
OF	7	Izzy Noel-Smith		(substituted off) 73'
BF	6	Harriet Millar-Mills	(yellow card) 59' to 69'	(substituted off) 69'
RL	5	Emily Braund
LL	4	Abbie Scott
TP	3	Victoria Cornborough		(substituted off) 74'
HK	2	Emma Croker		(substituted off) 60'
LP	1	Rochelle Clark		(substituted off) 78'
Replacements:
HK	16	Amy Cokayne		(substituted in) 60'
PR	17	Heather Kerr		(substituted in) 78'
PR	18	Bee Dawson		(substituted in) 74'
LK	19	Tamara Taylor		(substituted in) 69'
FL	20	Poppy Leitch		(substituted in) 73'
SH	21	Bianca Blackburn		(substituted in) 48'
FH	22	Ruth Laybourn		(substituted in) 69'
CE	23	Leanne Riley
Coach:
(England) Scott Bemand

FB	15	Niamh Briggs (c)	(substituted off) 73'
RW	14	Elise O'Byrne-White
OC	13	Aine Donnelly
IC	12	Sene Naoupu
LW	11	Mairead Coyne
FH	10	Nora Stapleton	(substituted off) 55'
SH	9	Larissa Muldoon
N8	8	Paula Fitzpatrick
OF	7	Claire Molloy
BF	6	Ciara Griffin	(substituted off) 64'
RL	5	Marie Louise Reilly	(substituted off) 79'
LL	4	Sophie Spence
TP	3	Ailis Egan
HK	2	Cliodhna Moloney
LP	1	Ruth O'Reilly
Replacements:
HK	16	Zoe Grattage
PR	17	Fiona Hayes
PR	18	Fiona Reidy
LK	19	Ciara Cooney	(substituted in) 79'
FL	20	Heather O'Brien	(substituted in) 64'
SH	21	Mary Healy
CE	22	Nikki Caughey	(substituted in) 55'
FB	23	Jackie Shiels	(substituted in) 73'
Coach:
(Ireland) Tom Tierney

Test: 1143	28 February 2016	Wales	10–8	France	The Gnoll, Neath
	14:00 GMT (UTC+0)	Try: Dyddgu Hywel 5' m Megan York 58' m	Report; WRU Report; FFR Report (in French)	Try: Safi N'Diaye 15' m Pen: Audrey Abadie 44'	Referee: Rose LaBrèche (Canada)

FB	15	Dyddgu Hywel
RW	14	Bethan Dainton
OC	13	Hannah Jones		(substituted off) 62'
IC	12	Robyn Wilkins
LW	11	Elen Evans
FH	10	Elinor Snowsill
SH	9	Keira Bevan
N8	8	Sioned Harries		(substituted off) 64'
OF	7	Sian Williams		(substituted off) 76'
BF	6	Rachel Taylor (c)
RL	5	Shona Powell Hughes	(yellow card) 39' to 49'	(substituted off) 62'
LL	4	Rebecca Rowe
TP	3	Catrin Edwards
HK	2	Carys Phillips
LP	1	Megan York		(substituted off) 59'
Replacements:
HK	16	Amy Price
PR	17	Cerys Hale
PR	18	Amy Evans		(substituted in) 59'
LK	19	Siwan Lillicrap		(substituted in) 62'
FL	20	Alisha Butchers		(substituted in) 76'
LK	21	Jenny Hawkins		(substituted in) 62'
CE	22	Kerin Lake
WG	23	Adi Taviner		(substituted in) 64'
Coach:
(Wales) Rhys Edwards

FB	15	Julie Billes
RW	14	Caroline Boujard	(substituted off) 41'
OC	13	Lucille Godiveau
IC	12	Élodie Poublan
LW	11	Laura Delas
FH	10	Audrey Abadie	(substituted off) 43'
SH	9	Yanna Rivoalen	(substituted off) 58'
N8	8	Safi N'Diaye
OF	7	Pauline Rayssac
BF	6	Laëtitia Grand	(substituted off) 43'
RL	5	Audrey Forlani	(substituted off) 56'
LL	4	Céline Ferer
TP	3	Julie Duval	(substituted off) 57'
HK	2	Gaëlle Mignot (c)	(substituted off) 56'
LP	1	Lise Arricastre	(substituted off) 57'
Replacements:
HK	16	Agathe Sochat	(substituted in) 56'
PR	17	Arkya Ait Labib	(substituted in) 57'
LK	18	Romane Menager	(substituted in) 56'
FL	19	Julie Annery	(substituted in) 43'
CE	20	Laure Sansus	(substituted in) 58'
FB	21	Camille Imart	(substituted in) 43'
WG	22	Coralie Bertrand	(substituted in) 41'
PR	23	Patricia Carricaburu	(substituted in) 57'
Coach:
(France) Jean-Michel Gonzalez

Test: 1144	28 February 2016	Italy	22–7	Scotland	Stadio Arcoveggio, Bologna
	14:30 CET (UTC+1)	Try: Melissa Bettoni 16' m Elisa Cucchiella 26' c Manuela Furlan 44' c Con: Veronica Schiavon (2) 26', 44'; Pen: Veronica Schiavon 31'	Report; FIR Report (in Italian)	Try: Lisa Thomson 52' c Con: Lana Skeldon 52'	Attendance: 2,500; Referee: Marie Lematte (France)

FB	15	Manuela Furlan
RW	14	Maria Magatti	(substituted off) 78'
OC	13	Maria Grazia Cioffi	(substituted off) 78'
IC	12	Beatrice Rigoni	(substituted off) 78'
LW	11	Sofia Stefan
FH	10	Veronica Schiavon
SH	9	Sara Barattin (c)
N8	8	Elisa Giordano
OF	7	Isabella Locatelli
BF	6	Michela Este	(substituted off) 50'
RL	5	Alice Trevisan
LL	4	Elisa Pillotti	(substituted off) 72'
TP	3	Melissa Bettoni
HK	2	Lucia Cammarano	(substituted off) 41'
LP	1	Elisa Cucchiella	(substituted off) 78'
Replacements:
HK	16	Lucia Gai	(substituted in) 41'	(substituted off) 78'
PR	17	Gaia Giacomoli	(substituted in) 78'
PR	18	Nicoletti Diletta		(substituted in) 78'
LK	19	Valentina Ruzza	(substituted in) 50'
FL	20	Ilaria Arrighetti	(substituted in) 72'
CE	21	Silvia Folli	(substituted in) 78'
CE	22	Paola Zangirolami	(substituted in) 78'
WG	23	Veronica Madia	(substituted in) 78'
Coach:
(Italy) Andrea Di Giandomenico

FB	15	Chloe Rollie
RW	14	Eilidh Sinclair		(substituted off) 46'
OC	13	Megan Gaffney		(substituted off) 67'
IC	12	Lisa Thomson
LW	11	Rhona Lloyd
FH	10	Lisa Martin (c)
SH	9	Jenny Maxwell	(yellow card) 31' to 41'
N8	8	Jade Konkel
OF	7	Karen Dunbar
BF	6	Jemma Forsyth		(substituted off) 62'
RL	5	Deborah McCormack		(substituted off) 62'
LL	4	Emma Wassell
TP	3	Lindsey Smith
HK	2	Lana Skeldon		(substituted off) 67'
LP	1	Tracy Balmer		(substituted off) 46'
Replacements:
HK	16	Sarah Quick		(substituted in) 67'
PR	17	Debbie Falconer			(substituted in) 75'
PR	18	Heather Lockhart		(substituted in) 46'	(substituted off) 75'
LK	19	Fiona Sim		(substituted in) 62'
FL	20	Anna Stodter		(substituted in) 62'
SH	21	Sarah Law		(substituted in) 46'
CE	22	Abigail Evans		(substituted in) 67'
CE	23	Claire Bain
Coach:
(Scotland) Shade Munro

=== Week 4 ===
Test: 1145	11 March 2016	Scotland	0–24	France	Broadwood Stadium, Cumbernauld
	18:00 GMT (UTC+0)		Report; SRU Report; FFR Report (in French)	Try: Penalty try (2) 39' c, 52' c Audrey Forlani 67' m Julie Duval 79' m Con: Laura Delas (2) 39', 52'	Attendance: 2,000; Referee: Helen O'Reilly (Ireland)

FB	15	Chloe Rollie
RW	14	Megan Gaffney		(substituted off) 53'
OC	13	Lisa Thomson
IC	12	Lisa Martin (c)
LW	11	Rhona Lloyd		(substituted off) 73'
FH	10	Sarah Law
SH	9	Jenny Maxwell		(substituted off) 53'
N8	8	Jade Konkel
OF	7	Karen Dunbar
BF	6	Jemma Forsyth		(substituted off) 51'
RL	5	Deborah McCormack		(substituted off) 73'
LL	4	Emma Wassell
TP	3	Lindsey Smith
HK	2	Lana Skeldon
LP	1	Heather Lockhart		(substituted off) 40'
Replacements:
HK	16	Sarah Quick
PR	17	Lisa Robertson		(substituted in) 51'
PR	18	Tracy Balmer	(yellow card) 50' to 60'	(substituted in) 40'
LK	19	Fiona Sim		(substituted in) 73'
FL	20	Anna Stodter
SH	21	Helen Nelson		(substituted in) 53'
CE	22	Lauren Harris		(substituted in) 73'
WG	23	Eilidh Sinclair		(substituted in) 53'
Coach:
(Scotland) Shade Munro

FB	15	Julie Billes	(substituted off) 66'
RW	14	Coralie Bertrand
OC	13	Lucille Godiveau	(substituted off) 75'
IC	12	Élodie Poublan
LW	11	Laura Delas
FH	10	Camille Imart
SH	9	Laure Sansus	(substituted off) 67'
N8	8	Safi N'Diaye
OF	7	Julie Annery
BF	6	Pauline Rayssac	(substituted off) 51'
RL	5	Romane Menager	(substituted off) 68'
LL	4	Audrey Forlani
TP	3	Patricia Carricaburu	(substituted off) 63'
HK	2	Gaëlle Mignot (c)	(substituted off) 72'
LP	1	Lise Arricastre	(substituted off) 60'
Replacements:
HK	16	Manon Bigot	(substituted in) 72'
PR	17	Maylis Traore Dhia	(substituted in) 60'
LK	18	Céline Ferer	(substituted in) 68'
FL	19	Laëtitia Grand	(substituted in) 51'
SH	20	Yanna Rivoalen	(substituted in) 67'
FB	21	Camille Boudaud	(substituted in) 75'
WG	22	Camille Cabalou	(substituted in) 66'
PR	23	Julie Duval	(substituted in) 63'
Coach:
(France) Jean-Michel Gonzalez

Test: 1146	12 March 2016	England	20–13	Wales	Twickenham Stoop, London
	18:05 GMT (UTC+0)	Try: Ceri Large (2) 10' c, 28' c Con: Amber Reed (2) 10', 28'; Pen: Amber Reed (2) 65', 79'	Report	Try: Robyn Wilkins (2) 49' m, 68' m Pen: Robyn Wilkins 30'	Referee: Sherry Trumbull (Canada)

FB	15	Katie Mason
RW	14	Lydia Thompson
OC	13	Lauren Cattell
IC	12	Ceri Large
LW	11	Lotte Clapp
FH	10	Amber Reed
SH	9	La Toya Mason	(substituted off) 57'
N8	8	Sarah Hunter (c)
OF	7	Izzy Noel-Smith	(substituted off) 79'
BF	6	Abbie Scott	(substituted off) 15'
RL	5	Tamara Taylor	(substituted off) 79'
LL	4	Emily Braund
TP	3	Victoria Cornborough	(substituted off) 75'
HK	2	Emma Croker	(substituted off) 48'
LP	1	Rochelle Clark	(substituted off) 75'
Replacements:
HK	16	Amy Cokayne	(substituted in) 48'
PR	17	Heather Kerr	(substituted in) 75'
PR	18	Bee Dawson	(substituted in) 75'
LK	19	Harriet Millar-Mills	(substituted in) 15'
FL	20	Poppy Leitch	(substituted in) 79'
SH	21	Bianca Blackburn	(substituted in) 57'
FH	22	Poppy Cleall	(substituted in) 79'
CE	23	Leanne Riley
Coach:
(England) Scott Bemand

FB	15	Dyddgu Hywel
RW	14	Bethan Dainton
OC	13	Hannah Jones
IC	12	Robyn Wilkins
LW	11	Elen Evans
FH	10	Elinor Snowsill
SH	9	Keira Bevan
N8	8	Alisha Butchers	(substituted off) 73'
OF	7	Sian Williams
BF	6	Rachel Taylor (c)
RL	5	Shona Powell Hughes
LL	4	Rebecca Rowe	(substituted off) 57'
TP	3	Megan York
HK	2	Carys Phillips
LP	1	Catrin Edwards	(substituted off) 27'
Replacements:
HK	16	Amy Price	(substituted in) 73'
PR	17	Cerys Hale
PR	18	Amy Evans	(substituted in) 27'
LK	19	Siwan Lillicrap	(substituted in) 57'
FL	20	Gemma Rowland
LK	21	Melissa Clay
CE	22	Kerin Lake
WG	23	Adi Taviner
Coach:
(Wales) Rhys Edwards

Test: 1147	13 March 2016	Ireland	14–3	Italy	Donnybrook Stadium, Dublin
	13:00 GMT (UTC+0)	Try: Lindsay Peat 33' c Paula Fitzpatrick 64' c Con: Niamh Briggs 33'; Nora Stapleton 64'	Report; IRFU Report	Pen: Michela Sillari 12'	Attendance: 6,000; Referee: Amy Perrett (Australia)

FB	15	Kim Flood
RW	14	Liz Burke
OC	13	Niamh Briggs (c)	(substituted off) 59'
IC	12	Sene Naoupu
LW	11	Alison Miller	(substituted off) 69'	(substituted in) 76'
FH	10	Nikki Caughey	(substituted off) 51'
SH	9	Mary Healy	(substituted off) 51'
N8	8	Sophie Spence	(substituted off) 59'
OF	7	Ciara Griffin
BF	6	Ciara Cooney	(substituted off) 65'
RL	5	Marie Louise Reilly
LL	4	Elaine Anthony
TP	3	Ailis Egan		(substituted off) 76'
HK	2	Cliodhna Moloney	(substituted off) 65'
LP	1	Lindsay Peat	(substituted off) 54'
Replacements:
HK	16	Zoe Grattage	(substituted in) 65'
PR	17	Ruth O'Reilly	(substituted in) 54'
PR	18	Fiona Reidy	(substituted in) 69'
LK	19	Claire Molloy	(substituted in) 65'
FL	20	Paula Fitzpatrick	(substituted in) 59'
SH	21	Larissa Muldoon	(substituted in) 51'
CE	22	Nora Stapleton	(substituted in) 51'
FB	23	Claire McLaughlin	(substituted in) 59'
Coach:
(Ireland) Tom Tierney

FB	15	Manuela Furlan
RW	14	Maria Magatti
OC	13	Maria Grazia Cioffi
IC	12	Michela Sillari
LW	11	Sofia Stefan	(substituted off) 73'
FH	10	Beatrice Rigoni
SH	9	Sara Barattin (c)
N8	8	Elisa Giordano
OF	7	Isabella Locatelli
BF	6	Michela Este	(substituted off) 69'
RL	5	Alice Trevisan
LL	4	Elisa Pillotti	(substituted off) 64'
TP	3	Melissa Bettoni	(substituted off) 35'	(substituted in) 68'	(substituted off) 76'
HK	2	Lucia Cammarano		68' to 76'
LP	1	Elisa Cucchiella	(substituted off) 73'
Replacements:
HK	16	Lucia Gai	(substituted in) 35'
PR	17	Gaia Giacomoli	(substituted in) 73'	(substituted off) 80+3'
PR	18	Nicoletti Diletta		(substituted in) 80+3'
LK	19	Valentina Ruzza	(substituted in) 64'
FL	20	Ilaria Arrighetti	(substituted in) 69'
CE	21	Silvia Folli
CE	22	Paola Zangirolami	(substituted in) 73'
WG	23	Veronica Madia
Coach:
(Italy) Andrea Di Giandomenico

=== Week 5 ===
Test: 1148	18 March 2016	France	17–12	England	Stade de la Rabine, Vannes
	21:00 CET (UTC+1)	Try: Gaëlle Mignot (2) 37' m, 70' m Audrey Forlani 55' c Con: Camille Cabalou 55'	Report; FFR Report (in French)	Try: Lydia Thompson 25' c Tamara Taylor 61' m Con: Amber Reed 25'	Referee: Amy Perrett (Australia)

FB	15	Laura Delas
RW	14	Camille Cabalou
OC	13	Lucille Godiveau
IC	12	Élodie Poublan
LW	11	Julie Billes	(substituted off) 65'
FH	10	Camille Imart
SH	9	Pauline Bourdon
N8	8	Safi N'Diaye
OF	7	Laëtitia Grand
BF	6	Pauline Rayssac	(substituted off) 65'
RL	5	Céline Ferer
LL	4	Audrey Forlani
TP	3	Julie Duval
HK	2	Gaëlle Mignot (c)
LP	1	Lise Arricastre	(substituted off) 70'
Replacements:
HK	16	Manon Bigot
PR	17	Maylis Traore Dhia
LK	18	Patricia Carricaburu	(substituted in) 70'
FL	19	Romane Menager
SH	20	Julie Annery	(substituted in) 65'
FB	21	Camille Boudaud
WG	22	Coralie Bertrand	(substituted in) 65'
PR	23	Caroline Boujard
Coach:
(France) Jean-Michel Gonzalez

FB	15	Katie Mason
RW	14	Lydia Thompson	(substituted off) 80'
OC	13	Lauren Cattell
IC	12	Ceri Large
LW	11	Lotte Clapp
FH	10	Amber Reed
SH	9	La Toya Mason	(substituted off) 56'
N8	8	Sarah Hunter (c)
OF	7	Izzy Noel-Smith	(substituted off) 51'
BF	6	Harriet Millar-Mills
RL	5	Tamara Taylor	(substituted off) 72'
LL	4	Emily Braund
TP	3	Victoria Cornborough
HK	2	Emma Croker
LP	1	Rochelle Clark
Replacements:
HK	16	Amy Cokayne	(substituted in) 51'
PR	17	Heather Kerr
PR	18	Bee Dawson	(substituted in) 80'
LK	19	Poppy Leitch
FL	20	Poppy Cleall	(substituted in) 72'
SH	21	Bianca Blackburn
FH	22	Leanne Riley
CE	23	Ruth Laybourn	(substituted in) 56'
Coach:
(England) Scott Bemand

Test: 1149	20 March 2016	Ireland	45–12	Scotland	Donnybrook Stadium, Dublin
	13:00 GMT (UTC+0)	Try: Alison Miller (3) 4' c, 41' m, 59' m Liz Burke 8' m Ciara Griffin 13' m Niamh Briggs 30' m, 48' m Sophie Spence 74' m Con: Niamh Briggs 4'; Pen: Niamh Briggs 27'	Report; IRFU Report	Try: Jenny Maxwell 32' c Rhona Lloyd 80' m Con: Lana Skeldon 32'	Referee: Sherry Trumbull (Canada)

FB	15	Niamh Briggs (c)
RW	14	Liz Burke
OC	13	Claire McLaughlin
IC	12	Sene Naoupu
LW	11	Alison Miller	(substituted off) 67'
FH	10	Nora Stapleton	(substituted off) 60'
SH	9	Larissa Muldoon	(substituted off) 49'
N8	8	Paula Fitzpatrick	(substituted off) 55'
OF	7	Claire Molloy
BF	6	Ciara Griffin
RL	5	Ciara Cooney
LL	4	Elaine Anthony	(substituted off) 60'
TP	3	Ailis Egan	(substituted off) 67'
HK	2	Zoe Grattage	(substituted off) 49'
LP	1	Ruth O'Reilly	(substituted off) 67'
Replacements:
HK	16	Cliodhna Moloney	(substituted in) 49'
PR	17	Fiona Hayes	(substituted in) 67'
PR	18	Fiona Reidy	(substituted in) 67'
LK	19	Orla Fitzsimons	(substituted in) 60'
FL	20	Sophie Spence	(substituted in) 55'
SH	21	Mary Healy	(substituted in) 49'
CE	22	Aine Donnelly	(substituted in) 67'
FB	23	Kim Flood	(substituted in) 60'
Coach:
(Ireland) Tom Tierney

FB	15	Chloe Rollie		(substituted off) 64'
RW	14	Megan Gaffney		(substituted off) 63'
OC	13	Lisa Thomson
IC	12	Lisa Martin (c)
LW	11	Rhona Lloyd
FH	10	Sarah Law		(substituted off) 41'
SH	9	Jenny Maxwell
N8	8	Jade Konkel
OF	7	Karen Dunbar
BF	6	Jemma Forsyth	(yellow card) 60' to 70'	(substituted off) 72'
RL	5	Deborah McCormack		(substituted off) 72'
LL	4	Emma Wassell		(substituted off) 64'	(substituted in) 69'
TP	3	Lindsey Smith				(substituted off) 69'
HK	2	Lana Skeldon		(substituted off) 72'
LP	1	Heather Lockhart		(substituted off) 41'
Replacements:
HK	16	Sarah Quick		(substituted in) 72'
PR	17	Lisa Robertson		(substituted in) 64'	(substituted off) 69'	(substituted in) 69'
PR	18	Tracy Balmer	(yellow card) 58' to 68'	(substituted in) 41'
LK	19	Fiona Sim		(substituted in) 72'
FL	20	Anna Stodter		(substituted in) 72'
SH	21	Helen Nelson		(substituted in) 41'
CE	22	Lauren Harris		(substituted in) 63'
WG	23	Eilidh Sinclair		(substituted in) 64'
Coach:
(Scotland) Shade Munro

Test: 1150	20 March 2016	Wales	12–16	Italy	Talbot Athletic Ground, Port Talbot
	14:00 GMT (UTC+0)	Try: Sioned Harries (2) 40' m, 46' c Con: Robyn Wilkins 46'	Report; FIR Report (in Italian)	Try: Beatrice Rigoni (2) 10' m, 27' m Pen: Michela Sillari (2) 34', 56'	Attendance: 2,000; Referee: Joy Neville (Ireland)

FB	15	Adi Taviner
RW	14	Bethan Dainton
OC	13	Hannah Jones
IC	12	Kerin Lake		(substituted off) 67'
LW	11	Elen Evans		(substituted off) 73'
FH	10	Robyn Wilkins
SH	9	Keira Bevan		(substituted off) 58'
N8	8	Sioned Harries	(yellow card) 55' to 65'
OF	7	Sian Williams
BF	6	Rachel Taylor (c)
RL	5	Siwan Lillicrap		(substituted off) 54'
LL	4	Shona Powell Hughes
TP	3	Amy Evans		(substituted off) 67'
HK	2	Carys Phillips		(substituted off) 51'
LP	1	Megan York		(substituted off) 67'
Replacements:
HK	16	Amy Price		(substituted in) 51'
PR	17	Cerys Hale		(substituted in) 67'
PR	18	Catrin Edwards		(substituted in) 67'
LK	19	Rebecca Rowe		(substituted in) 54'
FL	20	Alisha Butchers
LK	21	Elinor Snowsill		(substituted in) 58'
CE	22	Gemma Rowland		(substituted in) 67'
WG	23	Dyddgu Hywel		(substituted in) 73'
Coach:
(Wales) Rhys Edwards

FB	15	Manuela Furlan
RW	14	Maria Magatti
OC	13	Michela Sillari
IC	12	Paola Zangirolami
LW	11	Sofia Stefan
FH	10	Beatrice Rigoni
SH	9	Sara Barattin (c)
N8	8	Elisa Giordano
OF	7	Isabella Locatelli
BF	6	Michela Este		(substituted off) 28'
RL	5	Alice Trevisan
LL	4	Elisa Pillotti
TP	3	Melissa Bettoni		(substituted off) 73'
HK	2	Lucia Cammarano
LP	1	Elisa Cucchiella
Replacements:
HK	16	Lucia Gai		(substituted in) 73'
PR	17	Nicoletti Diletta
PR	18	Sara Tounesi
LK	19	Valentina Ruzza			(substituted in) 77'
FL	20	Ilaria Arrighetti	(yellow card) 39' to 49'	(substituted in) 28'	(substituted off) 77'
CE	21	Silvia Folli
CE	22	Maria Grazia Cioffi
WG	23	Veronica Madia
Coach:
(Italy) Andrea Di Giandomenico
