= 2018 Women's Six Nations Championship =

Women's rugby union competition

- Date: 2 February – 18 March 2018
- Countries: England; France; Ireland; Italy; Scotland; Wales

Tournament statistics
- Champions: France (6th title)
- Grand Slam: France (5th title)
- Triple Crown: England (19th title)
- Matches played: 15
- Tries scored: 57 (3.8 per match)
- Top point scorer: (France) Jessy Tremouliere (64)
- Top try scorers: (England) Ellie Kildunne (5) (France) Jessy Tremouliere (5)
- Official website: Official website

The 2018 Women's Six Nations Championship, also known as the 2018 RBS Women's Six Nations sponsored by Royal Bank of Scotland, was the 17th series of the Women's Six Nations Championship, an annual women's rugby union competition featuring six European rugby union national teams. Matches were held in February and March 2018, on the same weekends as the men's tournament, if not always the same day.

As in the 2017 tournament, the 2018 tournament used the rugby union bonus points system common to other professional tournaments: "As well as the standard four points for a win or two for a draw, a team scoring four or more tries during a match will receive an additional league table point, as will a team losing by 7 or fewer points". "Additionally, to ensure that a team winning all of its five matches (a Grand Slam) will also win the Championship, three bonus points will be awarded for this achievement".

== Table ==
Position	Nation	Matches				Points			Tries		Bonus points			Table points
Position	Nation	Played	Won	Drawn	Lost	For	Against	Diff	For	Against	T BP	L BP	GS BP	Table points
1	France	5	5	0	0	163	23	+140	25	2	4	0	3	27
2	England	5	4	0	1	187	44	+143	29	6	4	1	0	21
3	Ireland	5	2	0	3	79	92	−13	11	14	1	1	0	10
4	Italy	5	2	0	3	63	147	−84	10	22	2	0	0	10
5	Scotland	5	1	0	4	55	125	−70	8	20	0	1	0	5
6	Wales	5	1	0	4	48	164	−116	7	26	0	1	0	5
Source: sixnationsrugby.com

== Fixtures ==
=== Week 1 ===
Test: 1252	2 February 2018	Wales	18–17	Scotland (1 BP)	Parc Eirias, Colwyn Bay
	18:00 GMT (UTC±00:00)	Try: Kavanagh-Williams 11' m Bluck 40+1' m Lake 51' m Pen: J. Evans 24'	Report	Try: Rollie (2) 45' m, 62' m Konkel 69' c Con: Law 70'	Referee: Sean Gallagher (IRE)

Test: 1253	3 February 2018	(1 BP) France	24–0	Ireland	Stade Ernest Wallon, Toulouse
	19:00 CET (UTC+01:00)	Try: Banet 6' m Le Pesq (2) 25' c, 74' c Tremouliere 34' m Con: Tremouliere (2) 26', 75'	Report		Referee: Ian Tempest (ENG)

Test: 1254	4 February 2018	Italy	7–42	England (1 BP)	Stadio Mirabello, Reggio Emilia
	18:30 CET (UTC+01:00)	Try: Ruzza 34' c Con: Sillari 35'	Report	Try: Bern 6' c Hunter (3) 54' m, 67' c, 80' m Cleall 56' m Dow 60'm Kildunne 70'c Con: Daley-McLean (2) 7', 68'; Pen: Daley-McLean 43'	Referee: Tim Baker (HKG)

=== Week 2 ===
Test: 1255	10 February 2018	(1 BP) England	52–0	Wales	The Stoop, Twickenham
	12:15 GMT (UTC±00:00)	Try: Cleall (2) 8' c, 70' m Dow 17' c Riley 21' c Kildunne (2) 30' m, 79' c Packer 46' c Burford 60' c Con: Daley-McLean (6) 9', 18', 22', 47', 61', 80'	Report		Referee: Aimee Barrett-Theron (RSA)

Test: 1256	10 February 2018	Scotland	3–26	France (1 BP)	Scotstoun Stadium, Glasgow
	19:05 GMT (UTC±00:00)	Pen: Law 30'	Report	Try: Sochat 36' m Banet 39' c Boujard 71' c Le Pesq 80' c Con: Tremouliere (3) 40', 72', 80+1'	Referee: Graham Cooper (AUS)

Test: 1257	11 February 2018	Ireland	21–8	Italy	Donnybrook, Dublin
	13:00 GMT (UTC±00:00)	Try: Williams 10' c Griffin (2) 67' c, 74' c Con: Briggs (3) 11', 68', 75'	Report	Try: Ricci 80' m Pen: Sillari 40+2'	Referee: Tim Baker (HKG)

=== Week 3 ===
Test: 1258	23 February 2018	Scotland	8–43	England (1 BP)	Scotstoun Stadium, Glasgow
	19:05 GMT (UTC±00:00)	Try: Konkel 17' m Pen: Law 14'	Report	Try: Waterman (2) 3' c, 67' m Bern 7' c Pearce (2) 21' c, 47' m Kildunne 39' m Tuima 62' c Con: Daley-McLean (4) 4', 8', 22', 63'	Referee: Joy Neville (IRE)

Test: 1259	24 February 2018	(1 BP) France	57–0	Italy	Stade Furiani, Furiani
	21:00 CET (UTC+01:00)	Try: Banet (2) 8' c, 15' c Tremouliere 30' c M. Menager (2) 35' c, 76' m Sochat 40' c Rivoalen 73' c Bourdon 80+1' c Con: Tremouliere (7) 9', 17', 31', 36', 40+1', 74', 80+2'; Pen: Tremouliere 23'	Report		Referee: Rose LaBrèche (CAN)

Test: 1260	25 February 2018	(1 BP) Ireland	35–12	Wales	Donnybrook, Dublin
	15:00 GMT (UTC±00:00)	Try: Lyons 16' c Molloy (2) 40+2' c, 79' c Naoupu 52' c Tyrrell 74' c Con: Briggs (3) 17', 40+3', 53'; Flood (2) 75', 80'	Report	Try: A. Evans 44' c Harries 46' m Con: Snowsill 45'	Referee: Sara Cox (ENG)

=== Week 4 ===
Test: 1265	10 March 2018	France	18–17	England (1 BP)	Stade des Alpes, Grenoble
	21:00 CET (UTC+01:00)	Try: Tremouliere (2) 30' m, 79' m Drouin 40' m Pen: Tremouliere 55'	Report	Try: Dow 8' c Cokayne 51' c Con: Daley-McLean (2) 9', 52'; Pen: Daley-McLean 72'	Referee: Joy Neville (IRE)

Test: 1266	11 March 2018	(1 BP) Wales	15–22	Italy (1 BP)	Principality Stadium, Cardiff
	11:45 GMT (UTC±00:00)	Try: Butchers 32' m Harries 69' c Con: Wilkins 70'; Pen: Wilkins 28'	Report	Try: Locatelli 9' m Magatti 39' m Rigoni 50' m Sillari 80' c Con: Sillari 80'	Referee: Marie Lematte (FRA)

Test: 1267	11 March 2018	(1 BP) Ireland	12–15	Scotland	Donnybrook, Dublin
	13:00 GMT (UTC±00:00)	Try: Penalty try 50'; Fitzpatrick 69' m	Report	Try: Nelson 42' m Rollie 62' c Con: Skeldon 63'; Pen: Nelson 3'	Referee: Ian Tempest (ENG)

=== Week 5 ===
Test: 1268	16 March 2018	(1 BP) England	33–11	Ireland	Ricoh Arena, Coventry
	17:30 GMT (UTC±00:00)	Try: Waterman 11' m Packer 26' c Cokayne 30' c Kildunne 58' c Reed 64' c Con: Daley-McLean (4) 27', 31', 59', 66'	Report	Try: Molloy 71' m Pen: Tyrrell 20'; Briggs 34'	Referee: Alhambra Nievas (ESP)

Test: 1269	16 March 2018	Wales	3–38	France (1 BP)	Parc Eirias, Colwyn Bay
	18:00 GMT (UTC±00:00)	Pen: Wilkins 36'	Report	Try: Bourdon 6' c Drouin 12' c Tremouliere 40' m Penalty try 51'; Sochat 57' c Neisen 68' m Con: Tremouliere (3) 7', 13', 58'	Referee: Beatrice Benvenuti (ITA)

Test: 1270	18 March 2018	(1 BP) Italy	26–12	Scotland	Stadio Plebiscito, Padua
	15:00 CET (UTC+01:00)	Try: Bettoni 3' c Stefan 10' m Franco 27' c Rigoni 43' c Con: Sillari (3) 4', 28', 44'	Report	Try: Skeldon 57' m Sinclair 63' c Con: Skeldon 64'	Referee: Sara Cox (ENG)
