= 2017 Women's Six Nations Championship =

- Date: 3 February – 18 March 2017
- Countries: England; France; Ireland; Italy; Scotland; Wales

Tournament statistics
- Champions: England (14th title)
- Grand Slam: England (13th title)
- Triple Crown: England (18th title)
- Matches played: 15
- Tries scored: 90 (6 per match)
- Top point scorer: (England) Emily Scarratt (49)
- Top try scorer: (England) Kay Wilson (8)
- Official website: Official website

The 2017 Women's Six Nations Championship, also known as the 2017 RBS Women's Six Nations due to the tournament's sponsorship by the Royal Bank of Scotland, was the 16th series of the Women's Six Nations Championship, an annual women's rugby union competition contested by six European rugby union national teams. Matches were held in February and March 2017, on the same weekends as the men's tournament, if not always the same day.

For the first time, the 2017 tournament used the rugby union bonus points system common to most other professional rugby union tournaments. As well as the standard four points for a win or two for a draw, a team scoring four or more tries during a match received an additional league table point, as did a team losing by 7 or fewer points. Additionally, to ensure that a team winning all of its five matches (a Grand Slam) would also win the Championship, three bonus points were awarded for this achievement.

== Table ==
Position	Nation	Matches				Points			Tries		Bonus points			Table points
Position	Nation	Played	Won	Drawn	Lost	For	Against	Diff	For	Against	T BP	L BP	GS BP	Table points
1	England	5	5	0	0	216	35	+181	35	6	4	0	3	27
2	Ireland	5	4	0	1	81	69	+12	12	9	2	0	0	18
3	France	5	3	0	2	145	63	+82	21	7	3	1	0	16
4	Scotland	5	2	0	3	44	167	−123	6	29	0	1	0	9
5	Wales	5	1	0	4	60	137	−77	9	21	0	2	0	6
6	Italy	5	0	0	5	43	118	−75	7	18	0	1	0	1
Source: sixnationsrugby.com

== Fixtures ==
=== Week 1 ===
Test: 1187	3 February 2017	(1 BP) Scotland	15–22	Ireland (1 BP)	Broadwood Stadium, Cumbernauld
	18:35 GMT (UTC+0)	Try: Konkel (2) 6' c, 30' m Con: Law 6'; Pen: Law 37'		Try: Naoupu 11' m Miller 23' m Peat 52' m Murphy 80' +2 c Con: Stapleton 80' +3	Referee: (South Africa) Aimee Barrett-Theron

Test: 1188	4 February 2017	Italy	8–20	Wales	Stadio Pacifico Carotti, Iesi
	15:00 CET (UTC+1)	Try: Furlan 36' m Pen: Sillari 32'		Try: Thomas 16' c Hywel 46' m Phillips 66' m Con: Snowsill 17'; Pen: Snowsill 9'	Referee: (Canada) Rose LaBrèche

Test: 1189	4 February 2017	England	26–13	France	Twickenham Stadium, London
	19:35 GMT (UTC+0)	Try: Waterman 50' c Wilson-Hardy 77' c Con: Scarratt (2) 52', 78'; Pen: Scarratt (4) 44', 60', 68', 73'		Try: Izar 4' m Mignot 32' m Pen: Le Duff 28'	Referee: (Australia) Amy Perrett

=== Week 2 ===
Test: 1190	11 February 2017	Wales	0–63	England (1 BP)	Cardiff Arms Park, Cardiff
	11:30 GMT (UTC+0)			Try: Wilson-Hardy (2) 3' m, 61' m Cokayne 9' c Hunt 12' c Thompson (3) 23' c, 42' m, 67' m McLean 27' m Hunter 37' c Waterman (2) 48' m, 56' m Con: Scarratt (4) 10', 12', 24', 39'	Referee: (France) Marie Lematte

Test: 1191	11 February 2017	(1 BP) France	55–0	Scotland	Stade Marcel-Deflandre, La Rochelle
	21:00 CET (UTC+1)	Try: N'Diaye 18' m Izar 29' m Corson 34' c Poublan 41' c Guiglion 47' m Le Pesq (2) 50' c, 53' c Ladagnous 59' m Cabalou 66' c Con: Le Duff (2) 35', 42'; Cabalou (3) 51', 54', 67'			Referee: (Hong Kong) Tim Baker

Test: 1192	12 February 2017	Italy	3–27	Ireland (1 BP)	Stadio Tommaso Fattori, L'Aquila
	14:00 GMT (UTC+1)	Pen: Sillari 39'		Try: Lyons 51' c Spence 54' c Fitzpatrick 61' m Tyrrell 80' +2 m Con: Stapleton (2) 52', 55'; Pen: Stapleton 28'	Referee: (Australia) Rachel Horton

=== Week 3 ===
Test: 1193	24 February 2017	Scotland	15–14	Wales (1 BP)	Broadwood Stadium, Cumbernauld
	18:30 GMT (UTC+0)	Try: Thomson 40' +1 c Lloyd 61' m Con: Law 40' +2; Pen: Law 78'		Try: Phillips 20' c Penalty try 35' c Con: Snowsill (2) 21', 36'	Referee: (South Africa) Cwengile Jadezweni

Test: 1194	25 February 2017	(1 BP) England	29–15	Italy	Twickenham Stoop, London
	13:00 GMT (UTC+0)	Try: Wilson 15' m Wilson-Hardy 18' c Fleetwood (3) 26' m, 32' c, 45' m Con: Scarratt (2) 19', 33'		Try: Stefan 5' m Barattin 56' m Furlan 71' m	Referee: (Australia) Graham Cooper

Test: 1195	26 February 2017	Ireland	13–10	France (1 BP)	Donnybrook Stadium, Dublin
	12:45 GMT (UTC+0)	Try: Lyons 50' c Con: Stapleton 51'; Pen: Stapleton (2) 12', 63'		Try: Ladagnous 42' c Con: Trémoulière 44'; Pen: Trémoulière 66'	Referee: (England) Sara Cox

=== Week 4 ===
Test: 1196	11 March 2017	(1 BP) Wales	7–12	Ireland	Cardiff Arms Park, Cardiff
		Try: Powell-Hughes 43' c Con: Wilkins 44'		Try: Peat 39' c Tyrrell 62' m Con: Stapleton 40'	Referee: (England) Claire Hodnett

Test: 1197	11 March 2017	(1 BP) England	64–0	Scotland	Twickenham Stoop, London
		Try: Wilson (7) 3' m, 7' m, 27' m, 33' m, 45' m, 59' m, 79' c Cokayne (3) 11' m, 19' m, 40' +1 m Waterman 25' m Scarratt 75' c Con: Scarratt (2) 76', 80'			Referee: (Ireland) Sean Gallagher

Test: 1198	12 March 2017	Italy	5–28	France (1 BP)	Stadio Sergio Lanfranchi, Parma
		Try: Este 69' m		Try: Ladagnous (2) 8' m, 28' c R. Ménager 18' m Poublan 40' +1 m Con: Abadie 29'; Pen: Abadie (2) 14', 50'	Referee: (Ireland) Helen O'Reilly

=== Week 5 ===
Test: 1199	17 March 2017	Scotland	14–12	Italy (1 BP)	Broadwood Stadium, Cumbernauld
		Try: Rollie (2) 31' c, 40' +2 c Con: Skeldon (2) 32', 40' +3		Try: Bettoni (2) 11' c, 17' m Con: Sillari 12'	Referee: (England) Ian Tempest

Test: 1200	17 March 2017	Ireland	7–34	England (1 BP)	Donnybrook Stadium, Dublin
		Try: Lyons 66' c Con: Tyrrell 67'		Try: Wilson-Hardy 16' m Keates 53' m Cokayne 61' c Scarratt 69' c Thompson 74' c Con: Scarratt (3) 63', 70', 75'; Pen: Scarratt 59'	Referee: (Spain) Alhambra Nievas

Test: 1201	18 March 2017	(1 BP) France	39–19	Wales	Stade Amédée-Domenech, Brive-la-Gaillarde
		Try: Forlani 21' c Ladagnous 43' c Boujard 50' c Arricastre 68' c Trémoulière 79' m Con: Trémoulière (4) 22', 44', 52', 69'; Pen: Trémoulière (2) 4', 17'		Try: Powell-Hughes 11' m A. Evans (2) 46' c, 58' c Con: Wilkins (2) 47', 59'	Referee: (Ireland) Joy Neville

== Statistics ==
=== Top points scorers ===
Pos	Name	Team	Pts
1	Emily Scarratt	England	49
2	Kay Wilson	England	40
3	Amy Wilson-Hardy	England	25
3	Amy Cokayne	England	25
5	Jessy Tremouliere	France	24
6	Danielle Waterman	England	20
6	Lydia Thompson	England	20
6	Caroline Ladagnous	France	20
9	Victoria Fleetwood	England	15
9	Nora Stapleton	Ireland	15
9	Leah Lyons	Ireland	15

=== Top try scorers ===
Pos	Name	Team	Tries
1	Kay Wilson	England	8
2	Amy Wilson-Hardy	England	5
2	Amy Cokayne	England	5
4	Danielle Waterman	England	4
4	Lydia Thompson	England	4
4	Caroline Ladagnous	France	4
7	Victoria Fleetwood	England	3
7	Leah Lyons	Ireland	3
10	Jade Konkel	Scotland	2
10	Shannon Izar	France	2
10	Jade Le Pesq	France	2
10	Manuela Furlan	Italy	2
10	Lindsay Peat	Ireland	2
10	Hannah Tyrrell	Ireland	2
10	Élodie Poublan	France	2
10	Melissa Bettoni	Italy	2
10	Chloe Rollie	Scotland	2
10	Emily Scarratt	England	2
10	Shona Powell-Hughes	Wales	2
10	Amy Evans	Wales	2
