= Ciara Cooney =

- Born: 18 January 1988 (age 38) Galway, Ireland
- Height: 1.7 m (5 ft 7 in)
- Weight: 77 kg (170 lb)

Rugby union career
- Position: Lock
Amateur team(s)
Years	Team	Apps	(Points)
- Tullow RFC
Senior career
Years	Team	Apps	(Points)
20	Railway Union		
2015-present	Leinster		
2020-present	Wasps		
International career
Years	Team	Apps	(Points)
2015–present	Ireland	21	(0)
National sevens team
Years	Team		Comps
- Ireland 7s

Ciara Cooney (born 18 January 1988) is an Irish rugby player from Galway. She plays in the second row for Wasps RFC, Leinster and the Ireland women's national rugby union team. She works as a medical research scientist.

== Club career ==
Cooney's first sport was camogie and she took up rugby, initially with Tullow RFC, while studying at Carlow IT. She got a trial for Leinster in 2015 just six weeks after taking up the sport.

She joined Railway Union in September 2015 to get experience playing in the All Ireland League but continued to also play Leinster League with Tullow with whom she won a Leinster Division 2 medal.

To move her rugby up another level Cooney joined West London side Wasps, in England's Premier 15s in the Autumn of 2020, where her teammates include Irish teammates Claire Molloy and Cliodhna Moloney.

== International career ==
Cooney made her international debut, in Ireland's first Autumn international, a 3–8 loss to England, in November 2015.

She made her Women's Six Nations Championship debut, as a replacement against Wales, on 6 February 2016. She was selected as part of Ireland's squad at the 2017 Women's Rugby World Cup.

She has been part of the Ireland team in the 2016, 2017, 2018, 2020 Women's Six Nations and amassed 21 caps. She missed the 2021 Six Nations due to injury.

Injuries have interrupted her career at times but she was chosen, in the second row, by the Front Row Union website in the ‘Irish team of the Decade’ in 2021.

== Personal life ==
Cooney has a B.Sc. in Sport Science from Carlow Institute of Technology and a Masters in Science research from Galway/Mayo Institute of Technology and works as a research assistant, studying medical nutrition, for MET Gateway in Galway.
