= Alisha Joyce-Butchers =

Wales international rugby union player

- Born: Alisha Butchers; 14 June 1997 (age 29) Swansea, Wales
- Height: 1.65 m (5 ft 5 in)
- Weight: 73 kg (161 lb)
- Notable relative: Jasmine Joyce (wife) Nicky Smith (brother-in-law)
- Occupations: Active Young People Officer; Girls' Hub Officer

Rugby union career
- Position: flanker
- Current team: Bristol Bears Women
Senior career
| Years | Team | Apps | (Points) |
| 2016–2019 | Scarlets Ladies | | (0) |
| 2019–2020 | Worcester Warriors Women | | (0) |
| 2020– | Bristol Bears Women | | (0) |
International career
| Years | Team | Apps | (Points) |
| 2016– | Wales | 54 | (10) |
National sevens team
| Years | Team | | Comps |
| | Wales | | 5 |

Alisha Joyce-Butchers (née Butchers; born 14 June 1997) is a Welsh rugby union player who plays flanker for Bristol Bears Women and the Wales women's national rugby union team. She made her debut for the Wales rugby union team in 2016 and has played in 29 matches for the national side. Butchers scored her first international try in 2016 in a Women's Six Nations Championship victory over Scotland. She works as an Active Young People Officer and a Girls' Hub Officer while continuing her rugby career.

== Early life and career ==
Butchers' birth was on 14 June 1997 in Swansea, Wales. She was educated at Halfway Primary School in Llanelli.

She began playing sport in primary school. Butchers played for Bynea RFC, the Llanelli Schoolboys and the Scarlets under 18s team and the Carmarthen Quins RFC. She competed in the multi-sport 2013 School Games in Sheffield as a member of the gold medal-winning Wales Dragons A rugby union team.

Outside of rugby, she has worked for the Actif Sport and Leisure as a Sports Mentor and later as an Active Young People Officer full-time since she was 18. She is an ambassador for Vala Health. Since early 2019, Butchers is also employed as a Girls' Hub Officer at Cardiff Blues Community Foundation to increase grassroots rugby at Y Pant School and Bryn Celynnog Comprehensive School in the Pontypridd area.

== Rugby career ==
Butchers plays as a back-rower in rugby union. She made her international debut for the Wales women's national rugby union team against Ireland at the 2016 Women's Six Nations Championship, replacing Shona Powell Hughes in the second half of the match. She scored her maiden international try in a 23–10 win over Scotland the following week in the same tournament.

Butchers went on to make a further 27 appearances for the national side and scored an extra try in the 2017 Women's Six Nations Championship. She has also played five times for the Wales women's national rugby sevens team and scored five tries for them. Butchers was named to the rugby sevens side for the women's rugby sevens tournament at the 2018 Commonwealth Games in Gold Coast, Australia but did not play any games due to an ankle injury sustained during a game in the 2018 Women's Six Nations Championship. She was one of three Welsh women who played in a match for Barbarian F.C. against the United States in 2019 that the Barbarians won 34–33.

At the club level, she played for Scarlets Ladies until January 2019. Butchers signed to play for Premier 15s club Worcester Warriors Women with immediate effect that same month. She did however continue to represent Scarlets at the regional level. In June 2020, she signed to join Bristol Bears Women also of Premier 15 to increase the options available for coach Kim Oliver to select a back row player. Butchers fell on her ankle and sustained ligament damage in a training session for Bristol Bears in 2021. Her contract with the team did not cover all the medical costs for the treatment of her injury and the private insurance policy she took out was voided because the club was paying her, forcing her to fundraise online. She did not want to get operated by the National Health Service due to pressures it was under caused by the COVID-19 pandemic and her season would have ended prematurely. The situation attracted media attention and Butcher called for better education of problems with insurance in semi-professional women's rugby.

Butchers was selected for the Wales squad for the 2021 Rugby World Cup in New Zealand. She was named in the Welsh side for the 2025 Six Nations Championship in March.

== Personal life ==
Butchers has been in a relationship with her Bristol and Wales teammate Jasmine Joyce since 2016, they were engaged in 2022. The couple married in December 2023. She is the sister-in-law of Welsh forward Nicky Smith.
