= Siwan Lillicrap =

Wales international rugby union footballer

- Born: 27 September 1987 (age 39) Swansea, South Wales
- Height: 1.7 m (5 ft 7 in)
- Weight: 84.09 kg (13 st 3.4 lb)
- School: Ysgol Gyfun Gwyr
- University: Swansea University

Rugby union career
- Position: Lock
- Current team: Gloucester-Hartpury
Amateur team(s)
Years	Team	Apps	(Points)
- Waunarlwydd RFC
Senior career
Years	Team	Apps	(Points)
- Neath RFC
- Swansea RFC
2020–2022	Bristol Bears		
2022–present	Gloucester-Hartpury		
International career
Years	Team	Apps	(Points)
2016–2022	Wales	43	
- Correct as of 28 April 2021

Siwan Lillicrap (born 27 September 1987) is a Welsh rugby union player who plays as a lock or number 8 for Gloucester-Hartpury and the Wales national team. Lillicrap made her debut for Wales in 2016, and captained the team at the 2020, 2021 and 2022 Women's Six Nations Championship.

Lillicrap is one of the first professional women's rugby players in Wales. It was announced that Lillicrap would leave her role as Head of Rugby at Swansea University in order to become a full-time professional women's rugby player in January 2022.

== Club career ==
Lillicrap's interest in rugby was piqued at a young age, when she would spend her childhood weekends at Waunarlwydd RFC, watching her father coach and brother play. With no girls' team at the club, she was invited to train with Waunarlwydd women's team, but Lillicrap's mother would not allow her daughter to train with adult women. As such, Lillicrap did not play any rugby until she was seventeen and played her first full senior game two weeks later.

She played for Waunarlwydd while at university and in 2011 moved to Neath RFC. For some years after, Lillicrap played at Swansea RFC and for Ospreys Women. In 2020 Lillicrap moved to the English top flight competition, the Premier 15s with Bristol Bears. In June 2022, Lillicrap moved to Gloucester-Hartpury.

== International career ==
After spending almost five years in the extended Wales squad, Lillicrap earned her first cap for Wales at the 2016 Women's Six Nations Championship, making her international debut against Ireland as a second-half replacement for Rebecca Rowe. Her performance meant she was then named in the starting XV for the match against Scotland a week later at The Gnoll.

Lillicrap was made Wales skipper in autumn 2019, where she captained Wales to test wins over Ireland and Scotland ahead of the 2020 Women's Six Nations Championship. She captained the team again during the 2021 Women's Six Nations Championship.

Lillicrap was selected to captain Wales at the 2021 Rugby World Cup in New Zealand. On 30 November 2022, Lillicrap announced her retirement from international rugby.

== Personal life ==
Lillicrap attended Ysgol Gyfun Gŵyr, a Welsh language secondary school in Gowerton, Swansea, and studied sports science at Swansea University, graduating in 2009.

Before becoming a professional rugby player, Lillicrap was Head of Rugby at Swansea University since 2017, overseeing more than 300 players in both the men's and women's programmes from participation level up to high performance. Previously, she was the university's Sport Development Officer – a role she previously held at Cardiff University. Lillicrap is in a relationship with fellow Wales rugby union player Cara Hope.
