= Elisa Giordano =

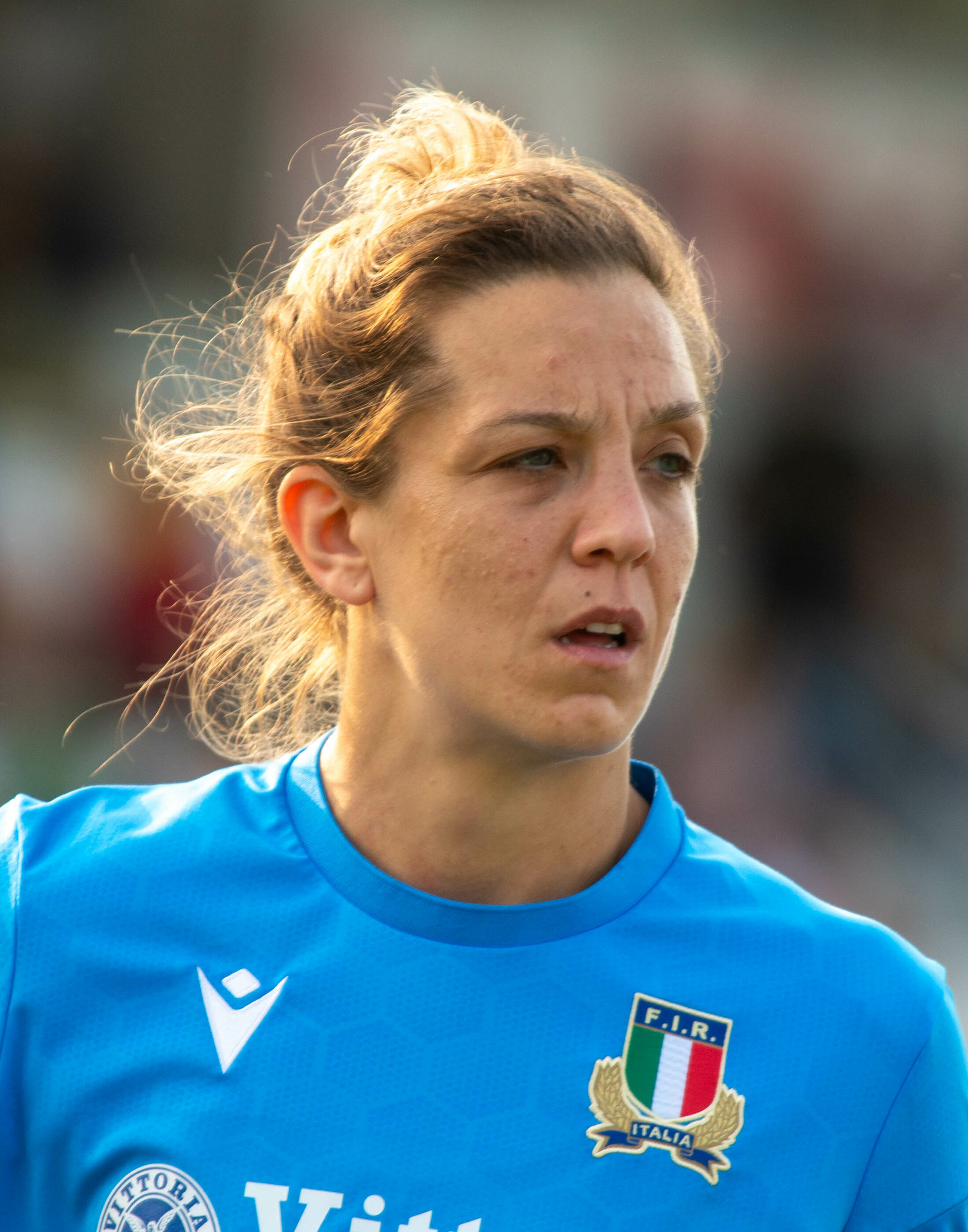
- Giordano in 2023
- Born: 27 July 1990 (age 36)
- Height: 177 cm (5 ft 10 in)
- Weight: 68 kg (150 lb; 10 st 10 lb)

Rugby union career
- Position: Back row
Senior career
Years	Team	Apps	(Points)
2009–	Valsugana		(0)
International career
Years	Team	Apps	(Points)
2011–	Italy	78	(50)
National sevens team
Years	Team		Comps
- Italy

Elisa Giordano (born 27 July 1990) is an Italian rugby union player. She plays in the Back row for Italy internationally and at club level for Valsugana. She captained Italy at the delayed 2021 Rugby World Cup in New Zealand.

== Rugby career ==
Coming from various sporting experiences including basketball and handball, Giordano came to rugby at the age of 19 and entered the women's team of Valsugana in Padua, the city where she began her university studies.

In November 2011, she made her international debut for the Italian national team in Nice against France. The following year, she took part in the FIRA European Championship in Rovereto, finishing third behind England and France.

After graduating in occupational therapy in 2013, she was available for selection for the national sevens team that took part in the rugby sevens tournament at the Summer Universiade. Italy won the silver medal, after they were defeated in the final 10–30 by Russia.

She was again present at the Six Nations in 2015 and 2016 with four wins in ten matches that helped Italy qualify for the first time in 15 years for the 2017 Women's Rugby World Cup, in which she took part. At club level, she won three consecutive championships, from 2015 to 2017, with Valsugana, the team of which she is captain.

In September 2022, she took over the captaincy of the Italian national team from Manuela Furlan for the 2021 World Cup, after she sustained an injury during a test match in preparation for the World Cup.

She was named in Italy's squad for the 2025 Women's Six Nations Championship. On 11 August 2025, she was named in the Italian side to the Women's Rugby World Cup in England.
