= Jenny Maxwell (rugby union) =

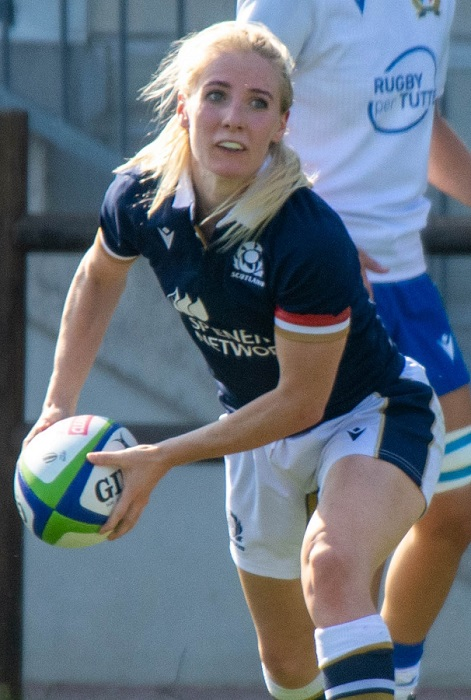
- Maxwell, during Scotland's 2021 RWC Qualifier match against Italy
- Born: 8 December 1992 (age 33) Leicester, England
- Height: 1.62 m (5 ft 4 in)
- Weight: 57.5 kg (127 lb; 9 st 1 lb)

Rugby union career
- Position: Scrum-half
International career
Years	Team	Apps	(Points)
2015–	Scotland	32	(5)

Jenny Maxwell (born 8 December 1992) is a professional rugby union player who plays as a scrum-half. She has played international rugby for Scotland since 2015. She was one of the team for the 2021 Women's Six Nations Championship. She jointly holds the record for the most Scotland Women's Sevens caps and has over 30 caps for XVs.

== Club career ==
At 15, Maxwell began playing for Nottingham Paviors RFC. Between 2012 and 2017 she played for Lichfield RFC, and played for her university, Leeds Beckett, from 2011 to 2016. Maxwell's first club contract was for Loughborough Lightning, in 2017. She plays Scrum Half for the Premier 15 side team.

== International career ==
In 2012, Maxwell successfully tried out for the Scotland under-20s. Maxwell made her international Sevens debut at the FIRA Grand Prix tournament in Brive in June 2013, scoring her first try against Germany in the Marbella event two weeks later. Her first XVs cap came in the 2015 Women's Six Nations Championships in a match against France. She also played in the 2019 Women's Six Nations Championships.

Maxwell suffered an ACL knee injury during Scotland's Test match with Spain at Almeria's Juan Rojas Stadium in January 2020, during a game where the visiting team won 36–12. She subsequently missed three test matches ahead of the 2021 Women's Six Nations Championship. Her rehabilitation was successful and she joined the 2021 Women's Six Nations Championship, in which Scotland lost to England and Italy, before beating Wales 27–20 to claim fifth place in the championship. In the winning match against Wales, Maxwell played her first start of the 2021 Championship at scrum-half.

== Personal life ==
Jennifer Rose Maxwell grew up in Leicester and began playing rugby aged six, in a mixed minis side at Leicester Forest East RFC, playing there until age 15, when she moved to play for Nottingham Paviors RFC and she was selected for the Scotland under-20 side in 2012/13.

Maxwell graduated with a First class BSc degree in Sport and Exercise Science from Leeds Beckett University and followed this with a MSc Sport and Exercise Physiology.

She now works for Loughborourgh College as an elite sport tutor and is also a performance lifestyle mentor for Loughborough University.

Maxwell qualifies to play for Scotland through her father who is from Annan in Dumfriesshire.

== Honours ==
- HSBC World Series qualifiers finalist (Hong Kong) 2019
