= Maria Magatti =

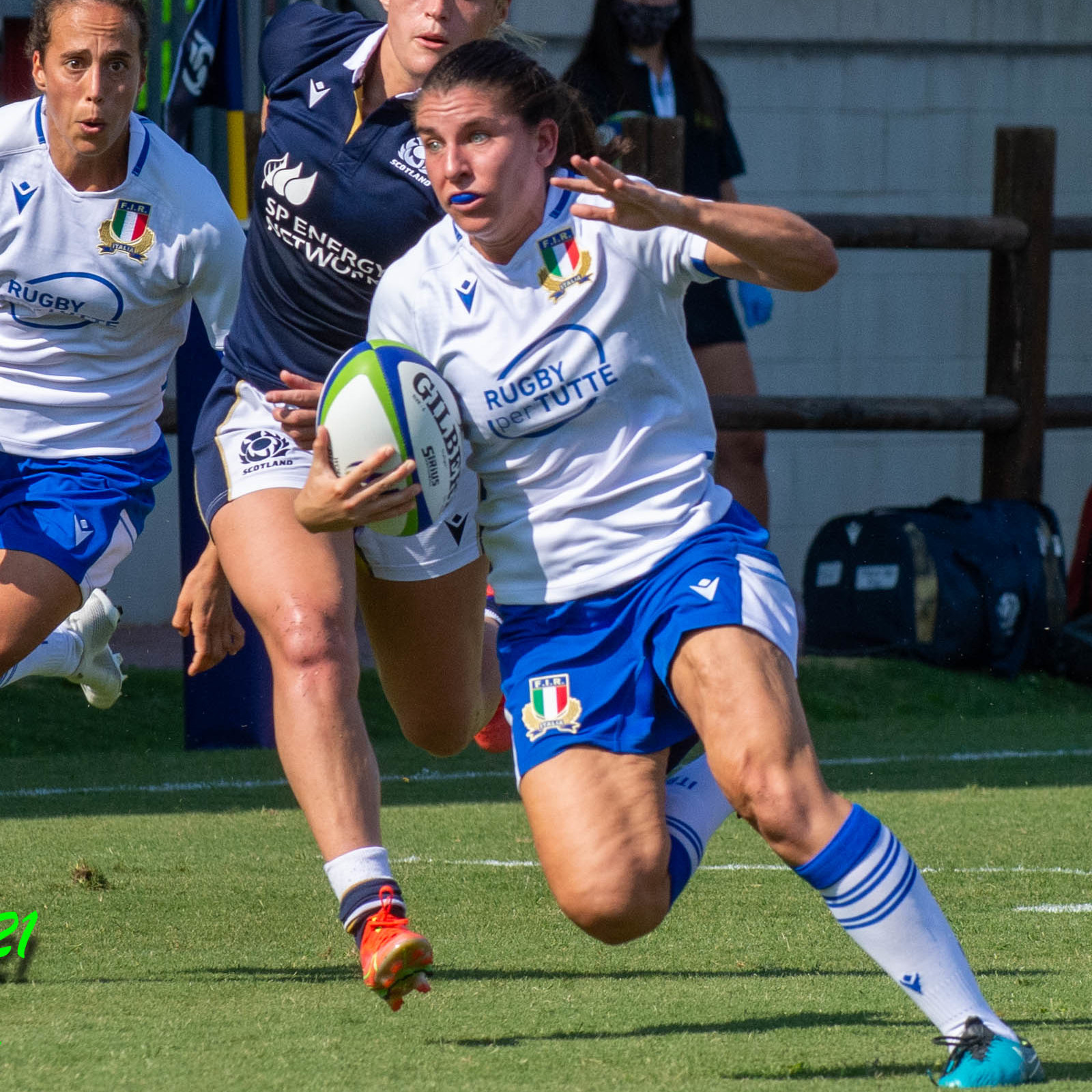
- Magatti in the RWC 2021 Qualifier match vs Scotland in Parma
- Born: 21 August 1992 (age 34) Como, Italy
- Height: 165 cm (5 ft 5 in)
- Weight: 66 kg (146 lb; 10 st 6 lb)

Rugby union career
- Position: Outside Back
Senior career
Years	Team	Apps	(Points)
2010–2018	Monza		(0)
2018–2022	CUS Milano Rugby		(0)
2024–	Villorba		
International career
Years	Team	Apps	(Points)
2011–2022	Italy	50	(70)

Maria Magatti (born 21 August 1992) is a former Italian rugby union player. She played as an Outside back for Italy internationally and for Monza and CUS Milano at club level. She competed for Italy at the 2017 and 2021 Rugby World Cups.

== Early life and career ==
Magatti is one of six children of Chiara Giaccardi and Mauro Magatti, sociology professors at the Catholic University of Milan, where she later studied motor sciences. She started playing rugby in high school after leaving basketball in her third year. She founded a women's club in Como together with some of her classmates and friends; two years later, after graduating high school and obtaining her diploma, she moved to Monza.

== Rugby career ==
In 2011, she made her international debut for Italy against Russia, at the FIRA tournament in Spain. In 2014, she was part of the Monza women's side, who were the first (as of 2018 only) non-Venetian rugby team to win a national title.

In 2015, she was the second best try scorer (with five tries) after France's, Julie Biles in the Six Nations which Italy closed with three victories in five matches and third overall; due to these three victories and the win against Scotland in the 2016 edition, Italy qualified for the 2017 Women's Rugby World Cup in Ireland, which she participated in. However, her tournament was short-lived, lasting only two matches. In the group stage match against England, Magatti scored a try but dislocated her shoulder and had to sit out the rest of the tournament.

She returned to national duties less than six months later, in February 2018 during the Six Nations, she scored once again against England; in the same tournament her try helped Italy win 22–15 against Wales in Cardiff, it was the first Italian victory ever at the Millennium Stadium.

Since the 2018–19 season she has been playing for CUS Milano and working as a physical education teacher.

Magatti competed in the delayed 2021 World Cup in New Zealand. During the quarter-final loss to France, she earned her 50th cap for Italy which was also her last match before retiring from international rugby for work reasons.
