= Adi Taviner =

Wales international rugby union player

Abi Taviner
- Born: 20 February 1990 (age 36) Neath, Neath Port Talbot, Wales
- Height: 5 ft 5 in (1.65 m)
- Weight: 67 kg (148 lb)
- Occupation: Lifeguard

Rugby union career
Amateur team(s)
Years	Team	Apps	(Points)
–	Neath Athletic		
–	Skewen RFC		
–	Ospreys		
International career
Years	Team	Apps	(Points)
2010–2017	Wales		

Abi Taviner (born 20 February 1990) is a Welsh rugby union player who has played centre wing for Ospreys Women's and the Wales women's national rugby union team. She won her first international cap in 2011, in a match against New Zealand at the 2010 Women's Rugby World Cup, and her first international try came against Ireland the following year.

== Biography ==
Taviner's birth was on 20 February 1990 in Neath, Neath Port Talbot, Wales. According to her biography page on the Welsh Rugby Union and Eurosport, she is listed at 5 ft 5 in (1.65 m) with a weight of 67 kg (10.6 st), and plays either as a centre wing or a full back. Outside of rugby, Taviner works as a lifeguard at Village Urban Resorts Swansea, and also plays badminton and table tennis.

She began playing rugby when she was a 14-year-old student at Llangatwg School in Aberdulais, and has played the sport for the West Wales, Welsh Students, Wales Sevens and various national teams. Taviner played for the Wales national under-20 rugby union team and she captained the nation to victory over England during the 2009–2010 campaign. At the 2010 Women's Rugby World Cup in London, she got her first international cap for the Wales women's national team in a match against New Zealand and went on to play in multiple Women's Six Nations Championship campaigns, as well as the 2014 Women's Rugby World Cup held in France in a surprise recall to the national side. She won 25 international caps before turning 26 years old, one of which was against the UK Armed Forces at the Cardiff Arms Park on 11 November 2015.

Taviner scored her first career international try in a match against Ireland at Pandy Park in 2011. At club level, she has played for Neath Athletic, Skewen RFC and captained the Ospreys Women's team.
