= Ciara Griffin =

Irish rugby union player

- Born: 10 January 1994 (age 32) County Kerry, Ireland
- Height: 5 ft 5 in (165 cm)
- Weight: 77 kg (170 lb)
- University: Mary Immaculate College, Limerick
- Occupation: School teacher

Rugby union career
- Position: Flanker
Senior career
Years	Team	Apps	(Points)
- St Mary's
–	Young Munster		
–	UL Bohemians		
–	Munster Rugby		
International career
Years	Team	Apps	(Points)
2016 –	Ireland	35	(20)

Ciara Griffin (born 10 January 1994) is an Irish rugby union player from Ballymacelligott, County Kerry. She plays flanker for UL Bohemians and Munster and has captained Ireland since 2018, including the 2021 Women's Six Nations Championship. She works as a primary school teacher.

== Club career ==
Griffin's father Denis is a stalwart of Castleisland Rugby Club and, at her behest, set up its first girls' team when she was 14. She moved to Tralee RFC for senior competition and joined All Ireland League club UL Bohemians at the start of the 2016/17 when she helped the Limerick side lift the Women's AIL for the first time since 2013, defeating holders Old Belvedere in the final.

She first played for Munster at Under-18 level and made her provincial senior debut in 2012.

== International career ==
Griffin had an inauspicious start to her senior international career. She unsuccessfully trialled twice for Ireland before getting called up to the national squad in 2015. She then broke her leg in her first Irish training camp. During her recovery she used a skateboard and yoga balls to support her injured leg during her rehabilitation work in the gym. She was back training with Ireland within two months.

She made her Irish senior debut, as a replacement, against Wales in the 2016 Women's Six Nations Championship and was part of the Irish squad for the 2017 Women's Rugby World Cup.

Adam Griggs named her Irish captain in January 2018 when she was aged just 24, a role she held until her retirement in November 2021 .

== Personal life ==
Griffin, known to her teammates as 'Junior', was the youngest of a family of four girls, from an area of Ireland (County Kerry) which is traditionally a gaelic football heartland. She played football and handball before moving to rugby in her mid-teens. She was inspired to play for Ireland by two Irish internationals - Siobhan Fleming and Helen Brosnan - who lived nearby.

Griffin works as a teacher in CBS Primary School, Tralee. She also has a personal fitness business and likes to help out whenever possible on the family beef farm.

She married Damien O'Sullivan in December 2020.

== Honours ==
- Ireland's Player of the Year in 2019, selected by Rugby Players Ireland
