= Dyddgu Hywel =

Wales international rugby union player

- Born: March 10, 1989 (age 37) Llanelwy, Denbighshire
- Height: 1.72 m (5.6 ft)
- Weight: 70 kg (150 lb)

Rugby union career
- Position: Fullback
- Current team: Gloucester-Hartpury
Amateur team(s)
Years	Team	Apps	(Points)
- Worcester
–	Pontyclun Falcons		
–	Scarlets		
–	Caernarfon RFC		
International career
Years	Team	Apps	(Points)
2013-Present	Wales	31	
- Correct as of 1 May 2016

Dyddgu Hywel (born 10 March 1989) is a Welsh rugby union player who plays fullback for the Gloucester-Hartpury and the Wales women's national rugby union team. She won her first international cap against Ireland at the 2013 Women's Six Nations Championship. Outside of rugby, she is a lecturer for the Coleg Cymraeg Cenedlaethol at Cardiff Metropolitan University.

== Early life and career ==
Dyddgu Hywel was born in Llanelwy, Denbighshire on 10 March 1989. She attended Bangor University, where she studied in Welsh for a BSc (Hons) Design and Technology Secondary Education leading to Qualified Teacher Status, graduating with a first class honours degree in July 2010. She began working at Coleg Meirion-Dwyfor, teacher A-Level design and technology. She went on to become a teacher at Ysgol Gyfun Rhydywaun in the same subject. Hywel is now a lecturer for the Coleg Cymraeg Cenedlaethol at Cardiff Metropolitan University.

== Playing career ==
Hywel was called up to the Wales women's under-16 national rugby union team once, but wasn't selected for any games. After being picked for the Wales women's national rugby union team at the 2013 Women's Six Nations Championship, she made her debut as a substitute against Ireland for the final five minutes of the game. She made her full debut a short while later with a start against France at the Stadium Marcel Levindrey, Laon.

Hywel has regularly scored tries, including against Scotland in the 2015 Women's Six Nations Championship where Wales won 39–3. She scored a try against France in the 2016 Women's Six Nations Championship, opening the scoring for Wales. They went on to win 10-8 following a second try by Megan York. As of 2016, Hywel's official Wales Rugby Union biography states that she is 1.72 metres (5.6 ft) tall, and weighs 75 kilograms (11.8 st).
