= Orla Fitzsimons =

- Born: 22 August 1981 (age 45)
- Height: 1.8 m (5 ft 11 in)
- Weight: 80 kg (180 lb; 12 st 8 lb)

Rugby union career
- Position: Lock
Senior career
Years	Team	Apps	(Points)
- St Mary's College
2007	Barnhall RFC		
International career
Years	Team	Apps	(Points)
2014	Ireland		

Orla Fitzsimons (born 22 August 1981) is a female rugby union player. She was a member of Ireland's 2014 Women's Rugby World Cup squad. She and Paula Fitzpatrick are also teammates at St Mary's College. She previously played for Barnhall RFC in 2007.
