= 1996 Women's Home Nations Championship =

International rugby union competition

- Date: 21 February – 3 March 1996
- Countries: England; Ireland; Scotland; Wales

Tournament statistics
- Champions: England (1st title)
- Grand Slam: England (1st title)
- Triple Crown: England (1st title)
- Matches played: 6

The 1996 Women's Home Nations Championship was the first Women's Home Nations Championship, featuring England, Ireland, Scotland and Wales. The first edition of the competition, which has since become an annual women's rugby union competition, was won by England, who achieved the Triple Crown. England also gained the Grand Slam by beating France outside of the championship.

== Final table ==
Position	Nation	Games				Points			Table points
Position	Nation	Played	Won	Drawn	Lost	For	Against	Difference	Table points
1	England	3	3	0	0	80	19	+61	6
2=	Scotland	3	1	0	2	35	23	+12	2
2=	Ireland	3	1	0	2	30	39	–9	2
2=	Wales	3	1	0	2	20	84	–64	2

== Results ==
21 January 1996

Ireland	0–21	Scotland

Blackrock

4 February 1996

England	56–3	Wales

Leicester

18 February 1996

Wales	11–6	Scotland

Bridgend

3 March 1996

Ireland	22–6	Wales

Old Belvedere

3 March 1996

Scotland	8–12	England

Meggetland Sports Complex, Edinburgh

17 March 1996

England	12–8	Ireland

Sunbury-on-Thames

== See also ==
- Women's Six Nations Championship
- Women's international rugby union
