= Isabella Locatelli =

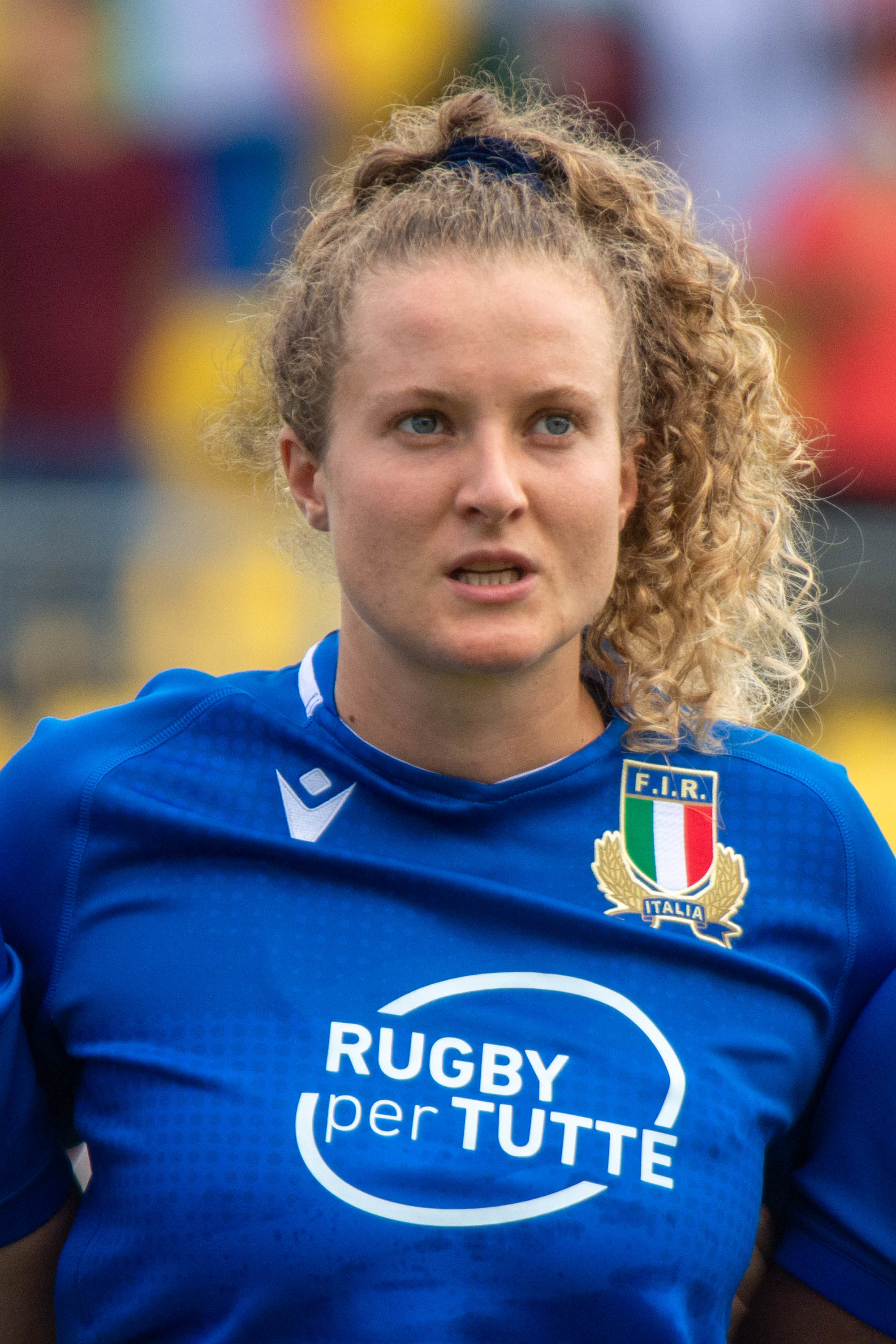
- Locatelli in 2021
- Born: 23 October 1994 (age 32)
- Height: 177 cm (5 ft 10 in)
- Weight: 75 kg (165 lb; 11 st 11 lb)

Rugby union career
- Position: Lock
Senior career
Years	Team	Apps	(Points)
2012–2021	Monza		(0)
2021–	Colorno		(0)
International career
Years	Team	Apps	(Points)
2014–	Italy	56	(5)

Isabella Locatelli (born 23 October 1994) is an Italian rugby union player. She plays Lock at international level for the Italy women's national rugby union team and at club level for Colorno. She competed at the 2017 and 2021 Rugby World Cup's.

== Rugby career ==
In 2012, she joined Monza and went on to win the national championship in 2014, they have also reached the final on two occasions although it ended in defeat.

She made her international debut for Italy against Scotland in 2014 in Avezzano, her side won 27–3. She contributed to Italy's qualification for the 2017 Women's Rugby World Cup during the 2016 Six Nations. She was subsequently included in the team that participated in the tournament in Ireland, Italy finished in ninth place overall.

During the 2018 Six Nations, she scored a try in Italy's 22–15 victory over Wales in Cardiff, it was the first ever win for an Italian team at the Millennium Stadium. A week later, she also featured in her sides 26–12 win against Scotland at Stadio Plebiscito in Padua.

She appeared for Italy in their November test against England in 2019. After nine seasons playing for Monza, she joined Colorno in October 2021.

She was a member of the Italian team that competed at the delayed 2021 Rugby World Cup in New Zealand. They created history by being the first Italian team, in both the men and women, to reach a rugby quarter-final for the first time.

Locatelli featured for Italy at the 2024 Six Nations Championship, she was the only Colorno player named in the side. She missed the 2024 WXV tournament in September due to injury.

She was named in Italy's squad for the Six Nations tournament on 5 March 2025. On 11 August, she was named in the Italian side to the Women's Rugby World Cup in England.

== Personal life ==
Locatelli grew up in Caponago and lists Australian rugby player, David Pocock, as one of her rugby influences. She is an economics student at the University of Milan-Bicocca.
