= The Gnoll =

Rugby stadium in Neath, Wales

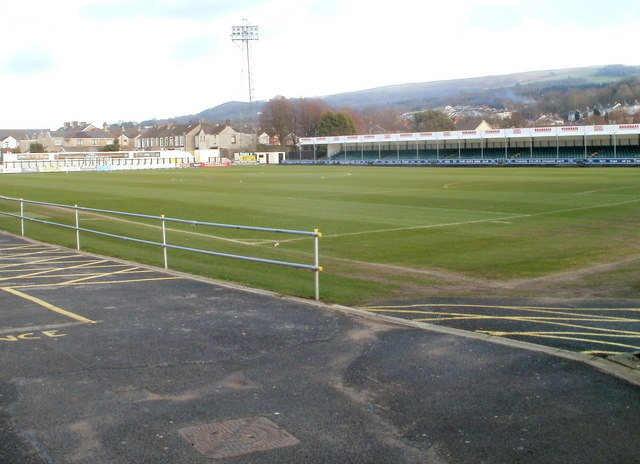
- The Gnoll in 2011
- Interactive map of The Gnoll
- Full name: The Gnoll
- Location: Neath, Wales
- Coordinates: 51°39′48″N 3°47′50″W
- Capacity: 6,000
- Surface: Grass

Tenants
- Neath Cricket Club (1848–present); Neath RFC (1871–present); Wales national rugby league team (2024–present); Wales women's national rugby league team (2024–present); Neath F.C. (2008–2012); South Wales Scorpions (2010–2013); Ospreys (rugby union) (2003-2005)

The Gnoll (Welsh: Y Gnol) in Neath, Wales is a sports ground, with a capacity of 6,000 (formerly 15,000). It is used primarily for rugby union, rugby league, and cricket, in addition to having previously been used for association football.

== Description ==
In July 2009, Neath RFC presented plans for the redevelopment of the Gnoll, including building a community centre on the site, which were criticised by Neath town councillors as being "too woolly".

== Rugby union ==
The Gnoll is the traditional home of Neath RFC, one of the leading Welsh clubs in the pre-regional era of rugby. It has hosted Neath since the club was founded in 1871. The ground has a capacity of 6,000.

The Gnoll has been used as the home ground for the Wales women's national rugby union team, including during the 2016 Women's Six Nations Championship where it was the site of a victory over France following a try by Megan York which qualified the team for the 2017 Women's Rugby World Cup.

== Rugby league ==
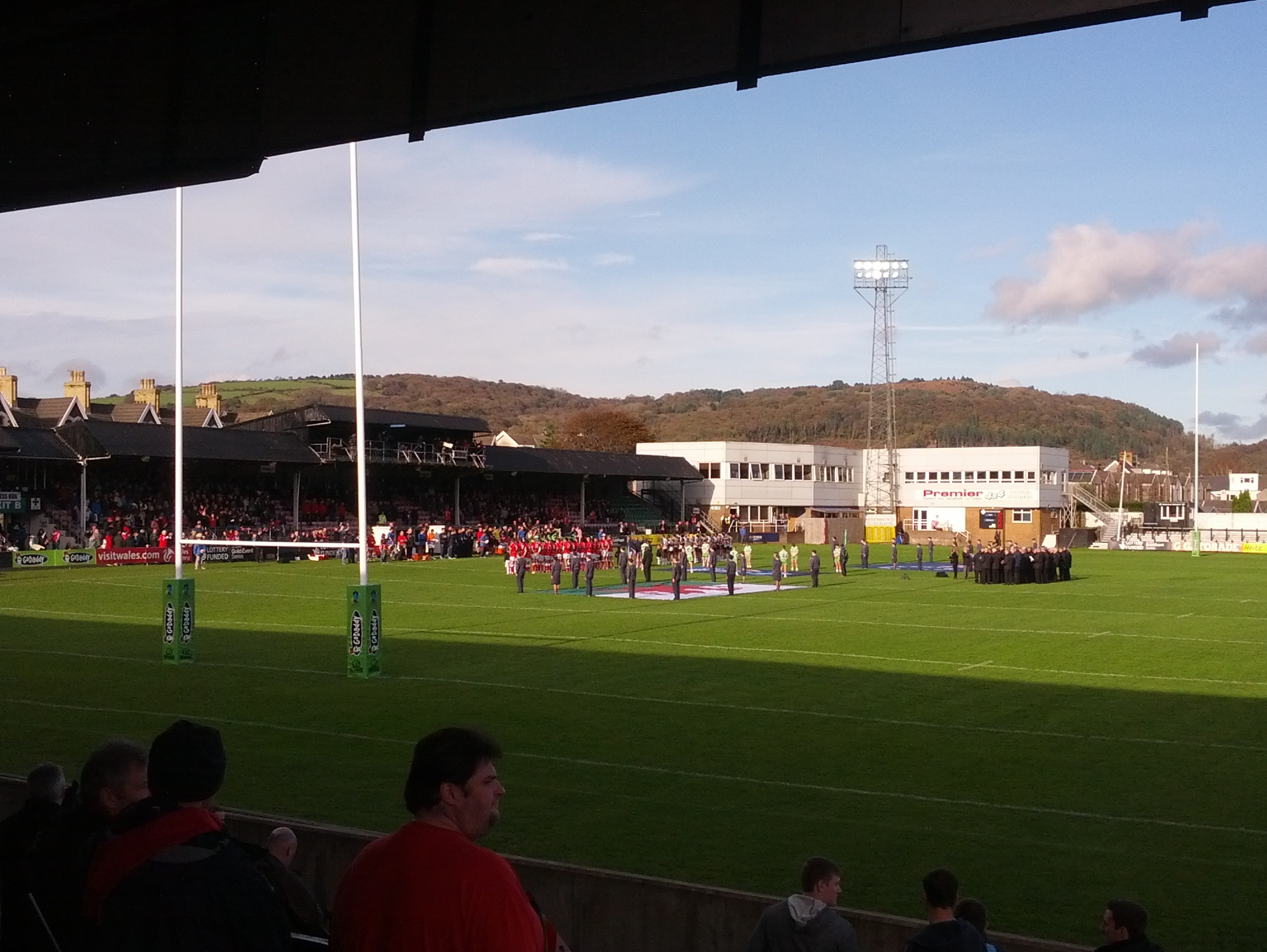
Wales vs Cook Islands at The Gnoll

South Wales Scorpions played at the Gnoll from their formation in 2010 until 2013. The ground hosted a Wales national rugby league team match during the 2010 European Cup, where Wales defeated Ireland 31–30. It also hosted Ireland at the Gnoll in at the 2011 Rugby League Four Nations. Wales won the game by 30 points to 6. The stadium also hosted Wales v Cook Islands at the 2013 Rugby League World Cup; it was the smallest venue used at the tournament and only hosted a single game.

In July 2024, the stadium became the official home ground of all Welsh national rugby league teams ran by the Wales Rugby League.

== Association football ==
Welsh Premier League club Neath Athletic played at The Gnoll between 2008, and their liquidation in 2012. The ground hosted its first ever football match when Neath Athletic played Swansea City in a pre-season friendly in July 2008.

== Cricket ==
The Gnoll started to host some Glamorgan County Championship fixtures in the 1930s, and in 1954 an indoor cricket school was opened at the site. However, problems with the pitch meant that from the late 1960s the ground was only used for one-day matches - in 1969 the Gnoll staged the county's first-ever home game in the Sunday League. In 1974, the Gnoll was dropped from the county's 1st XI fixture list, although it played host to Glamorgan's matches against the touring Australians in 1985 and 1993. Championship cricket returned to The Gnoll between 1986 and 1992 with Glamorgan staging five home games there, and one further first-class cricket game was played against a Young Australia team in 1995. Glamorgan returned to The Gnoll in August 2022, scheduling two 50-over matches in the 2022 Royal London One-Day Cup.

== See also ==
- List of rugby league stadiums by capacity
