= Elise O'Byrne-White =

- Born: 14 October 1990 (age 36)
- Height: 1.70 m (5 ft 7 in)
- Weight: 70 kg (154 lb)

Rugby union career
- Position: Right wing
Senior career
| Years | Team | Apps | (Points) |
- Leinster Rugby Old Belvedere R.F.C.
International career
| Years | Team | Apps | (Points) |
- Ireland

Elise O'Byrne-White (born 14 October 1990) is an Irish female rugby union player. She earned her first cap in 2016 against Wales in Donnybrook Stadium.

O'Byrne-White plays provincially for Leinster Rugby and plays her club rugby with Old Belvedere.

She competed in the Irish Sailing and Mountaineering Adventure Challenge.

She is a veterinary surgeon for the Dublin Society for Prevention of Cruelty to Animals. She appeared in the television series, "The Shelter: Animal SOS".
