= Audrey Forlani =

French rugby union player

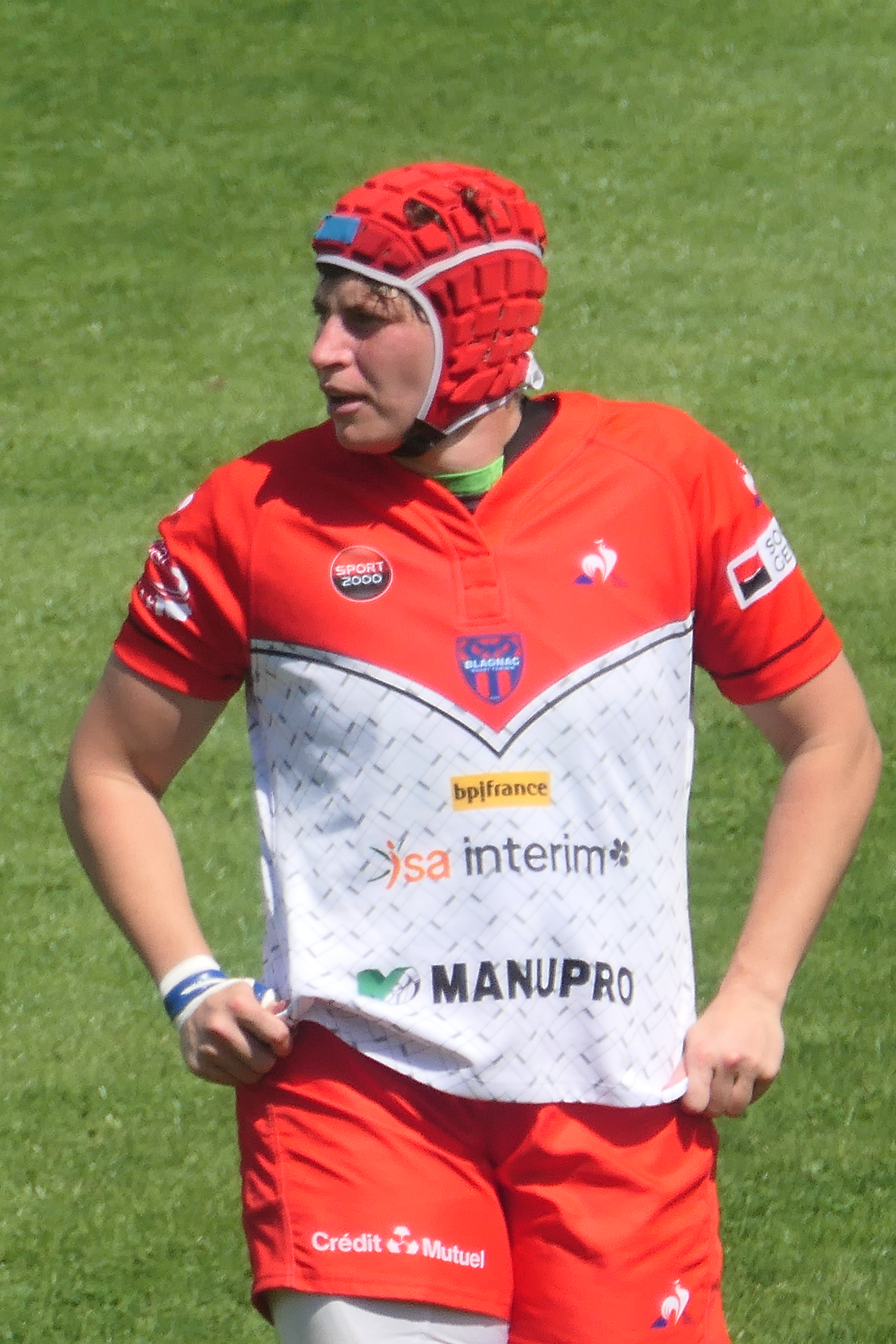
- Audrey Forlani in 2022
- Born: 19 November 1991 (age 34) Beaumont-de-Lomagne, France
- Height: 1.76 m (5 ft 9 in)
- Weight: 82 kg (181 lb)

Rugby union career
- Position: Second row
- Current team: Blagnac SCR
Senior career
Years	Team	Apps	(Points)
2007–	Blagnac SCR	?	(?)
- Correct as of 27 February 2021
International career
Years	Team	Apps	(Points)
2009–2011	France U-20	?	(?)
2011–	France	47+	(?)
- Correct as of 27 February 2021

Audrey Forlani (born 19 November 1991) is a French rugby union player who has made at least 47 appearances for the France women's national rugby union team. At club level, she plays for French women's Premier Division club Blagnac SCR.

== Club career ==
Forlani plays as a second row (lock). She started playing rugby at the age of six, and was the only girl in the boys' team. In 2007, she joined Saint-Orens rugby club (now known as Blagnac SCR), in Midi-Pyrénées. In her first season, Saint-Orens won the French women's Premier Division. In 2014, Forlani suffered a broken nose. She thought it was a routine injury but after it was fixed she developed headaches. Further damage was discovered and she had to have her hair shaved so that the doctors could repair a crack. Doctors questioned whether she would ever be able to play rugby again. The next year, she returned to French women's Premier Division rugby.

== International career ==
Between 2009 and 2011, Forlani played for the France under-20 team, including at the 2011 Under-20s Six Nations Championship. In 2011, she was called up to the France senior team. She was included in the French training squad ahead of the 2012 Women's Six Nations Championship, and was included in the squad for the tournament.

As a result of her broken nose, Forlani missed the 2014 Women's Rugby World Cup. She was recalled to the French team for the last three matches of the 2015 Women's Six Nations Championship. She scored a try which put her team into the lead in the final match of the 2016 Women's Six Nations Championship. France went on to beat England to win the tournament. She was included in the French squad for the 2017 Women's Rugby World Cup, and played in all the group stages matches as France reached the semi-finals of the competition. In January 2019, Forlani was one of 24 players to sign a part-time federal contract with the French Rugby Federation (FFR); her contract with the FFR was later extended for the 2019/20 season. Forlani was not included in the French training squad for the 2020 Autumn Internationals, or the delayed 2021 Women's Six Nations Championship. As of 2020, Forlani had made 47 appearances for France. Forlani has also played for the French rugby sevens team.

Forlani was selected for the 2022 Women's Six Nations Championship, and started their match against Italy.

== Personal life ==
Forlani is from Beaumont-de-Lomagne, France. She studied sports sciences at the Lycée Jolimont. Aside from rugby, Forlani works full-time in a farm shop in Tarn-et-Garonne, over an hour away from Blagnac rugby club. She is compensated by the FFR for loss of income at the shop when playing or in squad training with the French rugby team.
