= Heather Kerr =

England international rugby union player

- Born: 3 September 1991 (age 35) Ealing, England
- Height: 1.75 m (5 ft 9 in)
- Weight: 88 kg (194 lb; 13 st 12 lb)

Rugby union career
- Position(s): Prop, Hooker
Senior career
Years	Team	Apps	(Points)
2013	Darlington Mowden Park Sharks	-	(-)
International career
Years	Team	Apps	(Points)
2015–present	England	23	(30)
Medal record
Representing England
Women's rugby union
Rugby World Cup
Silver medal – second place	2017 Ireland	Team competition

Heather Catharine Kerr (born 3 September 1991) is an English rugby union player. She debuted for England at the 2015 Women's Six Nations Championship against Ireland. She was named in the 2017 Women's Rugby World Cup squad for England.

Whiile attending Durham University Kerr was persuaded to try rugby out, before 2012 she had never played rugby but made her international debut less than three years later. She holds a BSc degree in Geography and MSc in Risk and Environmental Hazards from Durham (St Mary's College) and completed a Doctorate in Civil Engineering at the same institution in 2019.
