= Megan York =

Wales international rugby union player (born 1987)

- Born: 16 April 1987 (age 39) Pontypool, Torfaen, Wales
- Height: 1.57 m (5.2 ft)
- Weight: 76 kg (12.0 st)

Rugby union career
- Position: Prop
- Current team: Ynysddu RFC/Newport Gwent Dragons
Amateur team(s)
Years	Team	Apps	(Points)
- Newport Gwent Dragons
–	Ynysddu RFC		
International career
Years	Team	Apps	(Points)
2012–present	Wales	25	
- Correct as of 30 April 2016

Megan York (born 16 April 1987) is a Welsh rugby union player who plays prop for Ynysddu RFC and the Wales women's national rugby union team. She won her first international cap against Scotland in the 2012 Women's Six Nations Championship, and her first try was against England in 2013.

== Playing career ==
Megan York was born in Newport, Gwent on 16 April 1987. As of 2016, her official Wales Rugby Union biography states that she is 1.57 metres (5.2 ft) tall, and weighs 76 kilograms (12.0 st).

Following her club form during the 2011-12 season, which brought her to the attention of the selectors for the national team, she was called up to the Wales women's national rugby union team for the 2012 Women's Six Nations Championship. She made her debut, being brought on as a substitute in the 67th minute against Scotland; Wales won the match 20-0. At the following year's tournament, she scored her first try in the defeat against England.

York's winning try against France at The Gnoll in the 2016 Women's Six Nations Championship for her 22nd cap for the national team was subsequently compared to that of Graham Price. Price had scored his try against the French on his debut in 1975. Nick Webb at BBC Sport Wales described York's try as "brilliant". York's try gave the team only their fourth victory against the French ever, and qualified them for the 2017 Women's Rugby World Cup. She currently plays for Ynysddu RFC and the Newport Gwent Dragons.
