= Audrey Abadie =

French rugby union player

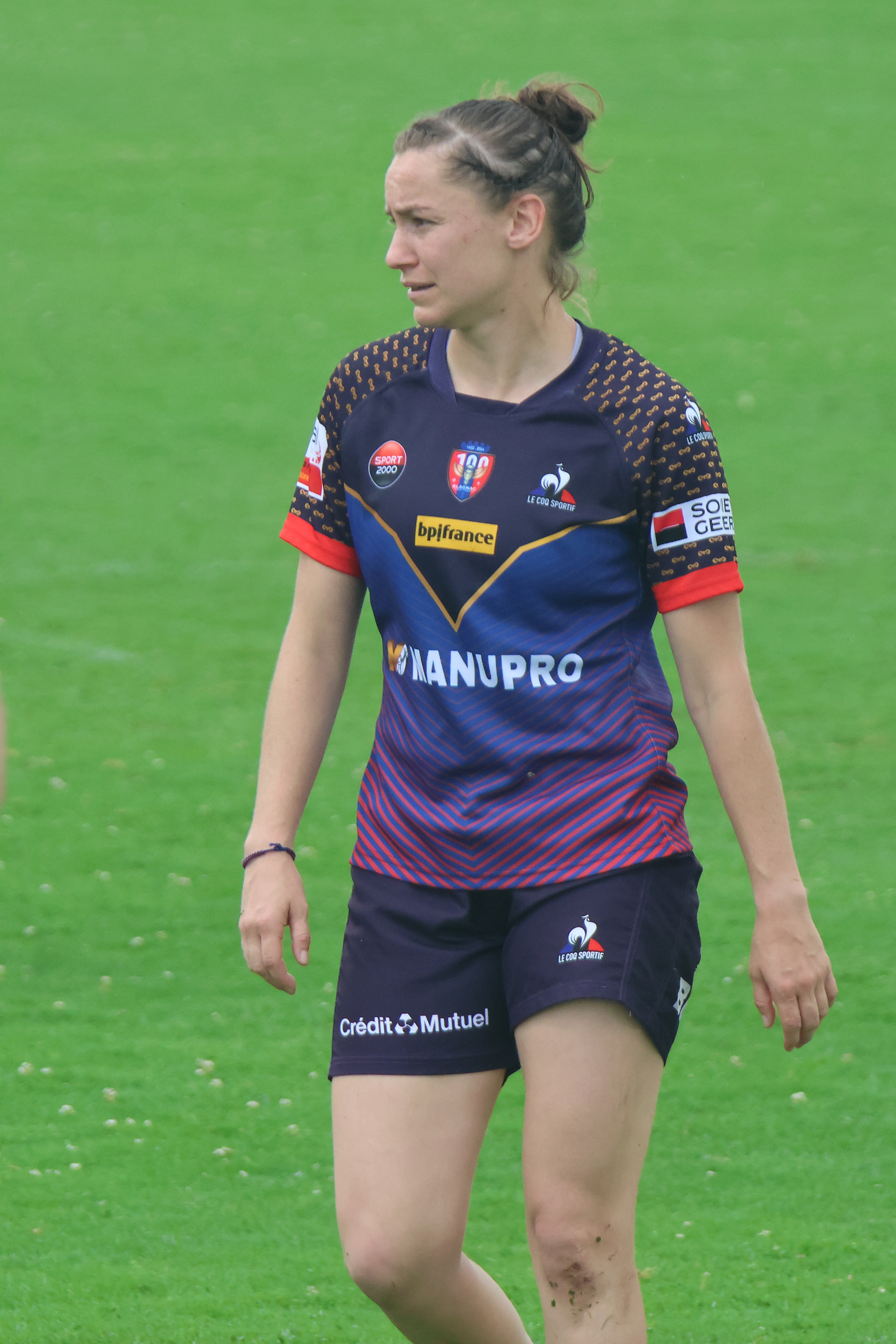
- Audrey Abadie in 2023.
- Born: 16 September 1992 (age 34)
- Height: 166 cm (5 ft 5 in)

Rugby union career
- Position: Fly-half
Senior career
Years	Team	Apps	(Points)
2012–Present	Blagnac SCR		
International career
Years	Team	Apps	(Points)
2015–2020	France	15	

Audrey Abadie (born 16 September 1992) is a French rugby union player. She plays for the France women's national rugby union team.

== Career ==
Abadie competed at the 2015 and 2016 Women's Six Nations Championship.

She was selected in the French squad for the 2017 Women's Rugby World Cup in Ireland. She was called up to the side for the 2020 Women's Six Nations Championship.

She plays for Blagnac Saint-Orens, now Blagnac SCR.
