= Beatrice Rigoni =

Italian rugby union player (born 1995)

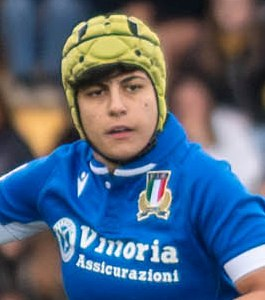
- Rigoni during Italy's Six Nations match against Scotland in 2024
- Born: 1 August 1995 (age 31)
- Height: 170 cm (5 ft 7 in)
- Weight: 69 kg (152 lb; 10 st 12 lb)
- School: Tito Livio School, Padua
- University: University of Ferrara

Rugby union career
- Position: Centre/winger
- Current team: Sale Sharks
Senior career
Years	Team	Apps	(Points)
2013–2023	Valsugana		(0)
2023–	Sale Sharks		(0)
International career
Years	Team	Apps	(Points)
2014–	Italy	87	(142)
- Correct as of 24 September 2025

Beatrice Rigoni (born 1 August 1995) is an Italian rugby union player who plays centre and winger for Sale Sharks and Italy. She competed at the 2017 and 2021 Rugby World Cup's.

== Early life and career ==
Beatrice Rigoni was born on 1 August 1995. She began playing rugby at the age of six, alongside her brothers, for the youth team of Petrarca Rugby in Padua, Italy. She continued to play for them until she turned 12, at which point she was no longer able to take part as mixed teams were not run above that age. She then moved to Valsugana Rugby Padova where she was a member of two under-16s championship teams and was named to the adult first team.

== Rugby career ==
While she was still attending the Tito Livio School in Padua, she was named to the Italy women's national rugby union team for the 2014 Women's Six Nations Championship at the age of 18. She made her international debut in the 12–11 defeat over Wales, the first match of the tournament for both teams.

She continued to play for club and country while attending the University of Ferrara where she is studying to be a pharmacist. Rigoni played for Italy at the 2017 Women's Rugby World Cup. According to her biography on the Six Nations website, Rigoni is 1.70 metres (5.6 ft) tall and weighs 69 kilograms (10.9 st).

Rigoni was selected in Italy's squad for the 2021 Rugby World Cup in New Zealand.

In July 2023, it was announced that Rigoni would join Sale Sharks Women for the 2023–24 Premiership Women's Rugby season. She was named in the Italian side for the 2025 Women's Six Nations Championship.

On 11 August 2025, she was named in the Italian side to the Women's Rugby World Cup in England.
