= Jean-Michel Gonzalez =

France international rugby union player & coach

Jean-Michel Gonzalez (born Bayonne, 10 July 1967), nicknamed Gonzo, is a former French rugby union footballer and a current coach. He played as a hooker and as a prop.

Gonzalez played for Cambo-Les-Bains, in his first years, Aviron Bayonnais, from 1985/86 to 1993/94, Section Paloise, from 1994/95 to 1997/98, and for Biarritz Olympique, from 1998/99 to 2004/05. He then become player-coach of Association Sportive de Bayonne, from 2005/06 to 2007/08. In 2008, he moved to Biarritz Olympique.

He won for Biarritz Olympique, the title of National Champion, in 2001/02 and 2004/05, and the Cup of France, in 2000.

Gonzalez had 35 caps, with a try scored, 5 points in aggregate, for France, from 1992 to 1996. He played all the matches at the 1995 Rugby World Cup, where France reached the 3rd place. He played three times at the Five Nations, in 1994, 1995 and 1996.
