= Yanna Rivoalen =

French rugby union player

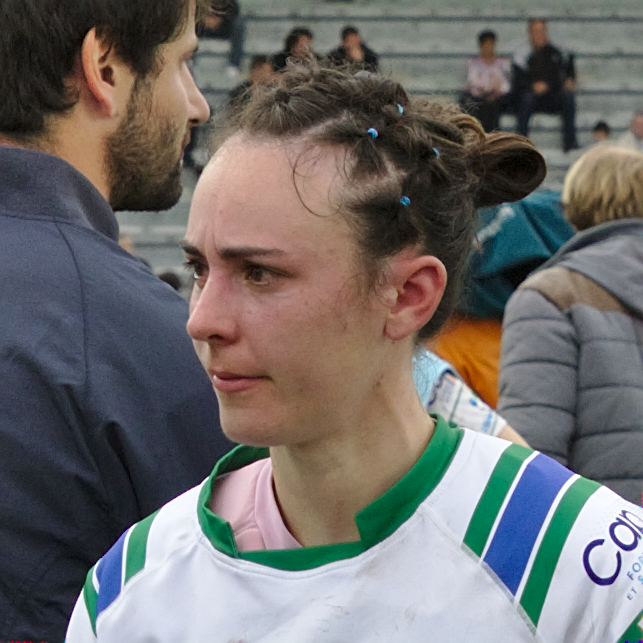
- Born: 10 June 1989 (age 37)
- Height: 1.66 m (5 ft 5 in)
- Weight: 62 kg (137 lb)

Rugby union career
- Position: Scrumhalf
Senior career
Years	Team	Apps	(Points)
-	Lille	-	(-)
International career
Years	Team	Apps	(Points)
2013–present	France	-	(-)

Yanna Rivoalen (born 10 June 1989) is a French rugby union player. She represented France at the 2014 Women's Rugby World Cup. She was a member of the squad that won their fourth Six Nations title in 2014.

Rivoalen is a P.E teacher. She picked up the game of rugby in high school after she switched from basketball.
