= Amy Price =

Illustrator and jewelry designer

- Born: 14 March 1878; Handsworth, West Midlands, UK
- Died: 6 February 1922 (aged 43); Birmingham, UK
- Occupation: Jewelry designer
- Known for: illustrations

Amy Price or Amy Morgan Price (14 March 1878 – 6 February 1922) was a British illustrator and jewelry designer.

== Life & Work ==
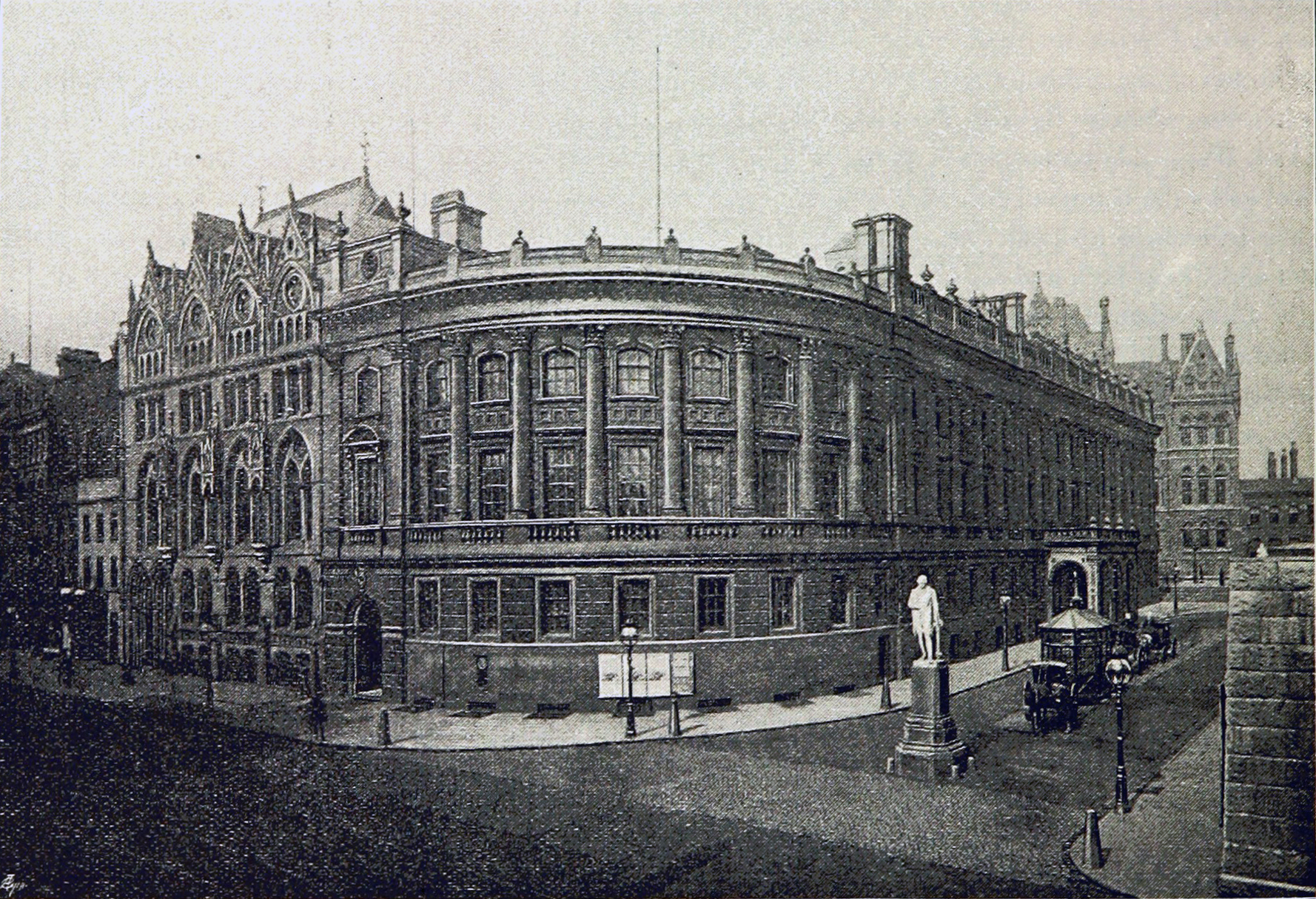
The Birmingham and Midland Institute

Price was born in Handsworth, West Midlands in 1878. She was the youngest of the family and frequently ill. She was educated at home and took to art whilst recovering from an illness. Her education was attending Monday evening lectures and lessons on English literature at the Birmingham and Midland Institute. Around the time of 1898 she attended classes at the Handsworth School of Art but she refused to conform to their expectations and she left.

Her financial income was raised from creating jewelry designs but none are known to now exist and the designs have been lost. Her diminishing reputation was not assisted by the loss of two of her best illustrations by Derby Art Gallery.They were called Joan of Arc is Received into Paradise and The Death of Clorinda.

Price lived at the family home and died hospital in Birmingham of peritonitis in 1922. After her death her sister Maud arranged for book to be published that included some of her illustrations, a short biography and the only two known photographs.
