= Amy Evans (rugby union) =

- Born: 30 September 1990 (age 36) Aberdare, Rhondda Cynon Taf, Wales
- Height: 1.70 m (5.6 ft)
- Weight: 89 kg (14.0 st)

Rugby union career
- Position: Tighthead prop
Amateur team(s)
Years	Team	Apps	(Points)
2014–	Skewen RFC		
Senior career
Years	Team	Apps	(Points)
2014–	Ospreys		
International career
Years	Team	Apps	(Points)
2015–present	Wales	24	
- Correct as of 6 May 2018

Amy Evans (born 30 September 1990) is a Welsh rugby union player who plays Tighthead prop for Skewen RFC and the Ospreys. She won her first international cap against England in 2015.

== Early life ==
Amy Evans was born on 30 September 1990 in Aberdare, Rhondda Cynon Taf, Wales. She was diagnosed with diabetes mellitus type 1 at the age of 11. As a child she was involved in sports, and studied at Aberdare Girls' School. While attending Breeze's Gym in Aberdare, Evans began competing internationally in weightlifting, representing Wales at several events. She worked at the gym as a manager and fitness instructor.

== Rugby career ==
Evans took up rugby union in late 2015, playing for Skewen RFC. She became involved in the Wales development programme, and was selected for the Wales women's national rugby union squad in the 2015 Women's Six Nations Championship five months after taking up the sport. She made her debut for the Wales team in the 13–0 victory over England during the tournament, having come off the bench as a substitute. She was named to the squad once again for the following Women's Six Nations Championship, while continuing to play for Skewen and the Ospreys.
