= Sioned Harries =

Wales international rugby union player

- Born: 22 November 1989 (age 36) Aberystwyth, Wales
- Height: 1.70 m (5.6 ft)
- Weight: 72 kg (11.3 st)
- School: Aberaeron
- University: Cardiff Metropolitan University
- Occupation: Physical education teacher

Rugby union career
- Position: Back row
- Current team: Whitland RFC/Scarlets
Senior career
Years	Team	Apps	(Points)
- Ospreys
–	Scarlets		
International career
Years	Team	Apps	(Points)
2010–present	Wales	43	
- Correct as of 21 May 2017

Sioned Harries (born 22 November 1989) is a former Welsh rugby union player who played back row for the Whitland RFC/Scarlets and the Wales women's national rugby union team. She won her first international cap against Australia in the 2010 Women's Rugby World Cup.

== Playing career ==
Sioned Harries was born in Aberystwyth on 22 November 1989. As of 2017, her official Wales Rugby Union biography states that she is 1.70 metres (5.6 ft) tall and weighs 72 kilograms (11.3 st).

She played for Aberaeron school and Cardiff Metropolitan University before moving joining Whitland RFC, a feeder team for the Scarlets. Harris has been named captain for the Scarlets on several occasions. She has also played for the Ospreys. Outside of rugby, she is a physical education teacher at Ysgol Gymraeg Bro Dur.

Having played for the Wales women's national under-20 rugby union team, she was named in the squad for the national team at the 2010 Women's Rugby World Cup. While there, she made her debut against Australia as a flanker. But at a later game, against Sweden, she was moved to the back row, more recently she has been played in the second row.

She continued to play for the Wales women's rugby union team, including at the 2014 Women's Rugby World Cup where she scored three times in the 35–3 victory over South Africa. Harris was in contention for the British team at the rugby sevens women's tournament at the 2016 Summer Olympics, but was not selected for the final squad. In addition, to the national rugby union team, she also played on the Wales women's national rugby sevens team.

Harries was selected in Wales squad for the 2021 Rugby World Cup in New Zealand.

She announced her retirement from rugby on 29 February 2024 and player her last game on 3 March 2024. In her final match, playing for Brython Thunder against Gwalia Lightning, she scored a try and a drop goal to help her team to victory.
