= Eilidh Sinclair =

Scotland international rugby union player

- Born: 6 July 1995 (age 31) Kirkcaldy, Scotland
- Height: 1.66 m (5 ft 5 in)
- Weight: 72 kg (159 lb)

Rugby union career
- Position: Winger
Senior career
Years	Team	Apps	(Points)
- Queensland Reds
- Exeter Chiefs
International career
Years	Team	Apps	(Points)
2014	Scotland		

Eilidh Sinclair (born 6 July 1995) is a Scottish rugby union player who plays as a winger for Exeter Chiefs and the Scottish national rugby team.

Sinclair attended the Community School of Auchterarder and played for the Murrayfield Wanderers and played for the University of Tasmania after moving to Australia. Sinclair made her Scotland debut in 2014, and scored on her first international start for Scotland in 2015 against England. Sinclair won European Grand Prix bronze in 2018 and made her World 7s Series debut in 2019. In Australia, whilst competing in the Super W series for the Queensland Reds, Sinclair converted briefly to the flanker position before returning to the wing.

Sinclair was selected to represent Scotland at the 2022 Commonwealth Games in rugby sevens. She was also selected for the COVID-delayed 2021 Rugby World Cup held in October 2022.
