= Lana Skeldon =

- Born: 18 October 1993 (age 33) Melrose, Scotland
- Height: 161 cm (5 ft 3 in)
- Weight: 80 kg (176 lb)

Rugby union career
- Position: Hooker
Senior career
Years	Team	Apps	(Points)
2017-2018	Watsonians		
2018-2020	DMP Sharks		
2021-2023	Worcester Warriors		
2023-present	Bristol Bears		
International career
Years	Team	Apps	(Points)
2011–present	Scotland	84	(130)

Lana Skeldon (born 18 October 1993) is a Scottish professional rugby player from Hawick. She has played in multiple Women's Six Nations Championships, including the 2021 Women's Six Nations Championship.

== Club career ==
Skeldon began her club career playing at Tennent's Women's Premier League side, Watsonians. She began playing for DMP Sharks in the Premier 15s in 2019.

She's been part of a Scottish Schools Cup-winning team on three occasions at U15 and U18 with Gala Girls and won the plate with Melrose Ladies in 2013.

She typically played six in back-row before one of her coaches offered her the chance to play as a hooker. She describes this as a turning point in her career.

In 2021 Skeldon was signed by Worcester Warriors. After Worcester left the Women's Premiership in 2023, she was signed to play for Bristol Bears

== International career ==
Skeldon made her international debut for XVs against the Netherlands in 2011. Before that, she represented Scotland Women U15, U16, U18 and U20. She was eleven when she started playing for Scotland.

Skeldon was named as one of eight ‘2021’ contracted players by Scottish Rugby ahead of the 2018/19 season, enabling her to train full-time.

She was part of the team that defeated Wales at Broadwood in 2017, which she describes as her proudest moment.

Skeldon was also part of the team that defeated Italy in 2017, converting tries for teammate Chloe Rollie.

Skeldon played in the 2019 South African tour, in which the Scottish team won two of its matches, playing for the first time in the Southern hemisphere.

She played in the 2020 Women's Six Nations Championship, which was disrupted due to COVID-19. She was also part of the squad for the 2021 Women's Six Nations Championship, playing in all three matches against England, Italy and Wales.

She was named in Scotland's squad for the 2025 Six Nations Championship. She later made the Scottish side for the Women's Rugby World Cup in England.

== Personal life ==
The former pupil of Hawick High School spent her teenage years playing football, hockey and rugby before dedicating her time fully to the latter.

Her mother Ann Skeldon played rugby for Hawick Ladies and Skeldon states this as her inspiration for learning the sport. Her father Michael also played rugby, representing Hawick Harlequins.

Before being awarded a Scottish Rugby 2021 contract, she worked in a cashmere factory in Hawick, balancing work with her rugby training commitments.

Based at Borders Academy, she coaches local rugby and studies sport fitness and coaching with the Open University.

Lana is a passionate advocate for women's rugby, and spoke about this in an interview with ITV in 2020 for International Women's Day. In 2020, she was among the Scottish players who took part in a sponsored run in Edinburgh to help promote the sport to more women and girls.
