= Paula Fitzpatrick =

Irish rugby union player

- Born: 12 August 1985 (age 41)
- Height: 1.75 m (5 ft 9 in)
- Weight: 82 kg (181 lb; 12 st 13 lb)

Rugby union career
- Position: Loose forward
Senior career
Years	Team	Apps	(Points)
201x–201x	St Mary's College		
Provincial / State sides
Years	Team	Apps	(Points)
201x–201x	Leinster		
International career
Years	Team	Apps	(Points)
- Ireland

Paula Fitzpatrick (born 12 August 1985) is an Irish rugby union player. She was a member of the Irish squad to the 2014 Women's Rugby World Cup. She took on the blindside Flanker role in their historical defeat of the Black Ferns.

Fitzpatrick initially played as Hooker before transitioning into her current Loose forward position.
