= Women's Six Nations Championship =

Rugby tournament

- Current season, competition or edition: 2026 Women's Six Nations Championship
- Sport: Rugby union
- Founded: 1996
- No. of teams: 6 (from 2002); 5 (1999–2001); 4 (1996–1998)
- Country: England; France; Ireland; Italy; Scotland; Wales
- Most recent champion: England (2026)
- Most titles: England (22)

The Women's Six Nations Championship, known as the Guinness Women's Six Nations for sponsorship purposes, is an international rugby union competition featuring six European women's national teams. It started in the 1995–96 season as the Home Nations, with four teams: England, Ireland, Scotland and Wales.

In the 1998–99 season, it became the Five Nations, with France joining the original four. The following season, Spain replaced Ireland for two seasons.

In 2001–02, the women's Six Nations competition was born with England, France, Ireland, Scotland, Spain and Wales playing, after Ireland re-joined the competition. Spain, at that time, were higher ranked than Italy, and therefore were awarded their place in the competition on merit.

In 2006, a championship trophy was commissioned from silversmith Thomas Lyte, to be followed by a second trophy commissioned for the Under 20 Six Nations championship. Designed and created by Thomas Lyte, the trophies are made from sterling silver and feature engraving detail with the logos of the competing countries.

In 2007, the Six Nations committee formally adopted Italy as the sixth national team member in the championship, replacing Spain. This aligned the women's competition with the men's competition.

A new trophy was unveiled in 2023, designed and made by British silverware manufacturers Thomas Lyte. The trophy stands 25 inches in height and features six arms reaching upwards representing the nations taking part in the competition.

England have been the dominant team in the competition, winning 22 of the 30 editions, as of 2026.

== Results ==
=== Overall ===
	England	France	Ireland	Italy	Scotland	Spain	Wales
Tournaments	31	28	29	20	31	7	31
Outright Wins	22	6	2	0	1	0	0
Grand Slams	20	5	1	0	1	0	0
Triple Crowns	26	—N/a	2	—N/a	1	—N/a	1
Wooden Spoons	0	0	6	3	9	2	10

=== Home Nations (1996–1998) ===
Year	Champions	Grand Slam	Triple Crown	Wooden Spoon
1996	England	England	England	Wales
1997	England	England	England	Ireland
1998	Scotland	Scotland	Scotland	Ireland

=== Five Nations (1999–2001) ===
Year	Champions	Grand Slam	Triple Crown	Wooden Spoon
1999	England	England	England	Ireland
2000	England	England	England	Wales
2001	England	England	England	Wales

=== Six Nations (2002–present) ===
Year	Champions	Grand Slam	Triple Crown	Wooden Spoon
2002	France	France	England	Ireland
2003	England	England	England	Spain
2004	France	France	England	Ireland
2005	France	France	England	Wales
2006	England	England	England	Spain
2007	England	England	England	Italy
2008	England	England	England	Scotland
2009	England	—	Wales	Italy
2010	England	England	England	Wales
2011	England	England	England	Scotland
2012	England	England	England	Scotland
2013	Ireland	Ireland	Ireland	Scotland
2014	France	France	England	Scotland
2015	Ireland	—	Ireland	Scotland
2016	France	—	England	Scotland
2017	England	England	England	Italy
2018	France	France	England	Wales
2019	England	England	England	Scotland
2020	England	England	England	Not completed (Note: Three fixtures in the 2020 tournament were cancelled, due to the COVID-19 pandemic.)
2021	England	Not contested (Note: The 2021 tournament followed a one-off format, which consisted of two pools with three teams each. The teams all played one home and one away match, before the top ranked teams in each pool contested the final.)		Wales
2022	England	England	England	Scotland
2023	England	England	England	Ireland
2024	England	England	England	Wales
2025	England	England	England	Wales
2026	England	England	England	Wales

== Final positions ==
=== Summary ===
	Home Nations			Five Nations			Six Nations
	1996	1997	1998	1999	2000	2001	2002	2003	2004	2005	2006	2007	2008	2009	2010	2011	2012	2013	2014	2015	2016	2017	2018	2019	2020	2021	2022	2023	2024	2025	2026
England	1st	1st	2nd	1st	1st	1st	2nd	1st	2nd	2nd	1st	1st	1st	1st	1st	1st	1st	3rd	2nd	4th	2nd	1st	2nd	1st	1st	1st	1st	1st	1st	1st	1st
France	—	—	—	2nd	2nd	2nd	1st	3rd	1st	1st	3rd	2nd	3rd	4th	2nd	2nd	2nd	2nd	1st	2nd	1st	3rd	1st	3rd	2nd	2nd	2nd	2nd	2nd	2nd	2nd
Ireland	3rd	4th	4th	5th	—	—	6th	5th	5th	5th	5th	4th	4th	3rd	3rd	3rd	3rd	1st	3rd	1st	3rd	2nd	3rd	5th	3rd	3rd	4th	6th	3rd	3rd	3rd
Italy	—	—	—	—	—	—	—	—	—	—	—	6th	5th	6th	5th	5th	5th	5th	4th	3rd	5th	6th	4th	2nd	4th	4th	5th	5th	5th	4th	4th
Scotland	2nd	2nd	1st	3rd	4th	4th	3rd	2nd	4th	3rd	4th	5th	6th	5th	4th	6th	6th	6th	6th	6th	6th	4th	5th	6th	5th	5th	6th	4th	4th	5th	5th
Spain	—	—	—	—	3rd	3rd	4th	6th	3rd	4th	6th	—	—	—	—	—	—	—	—	—	—	—	—	—	—	—	—	—	—	—	—
Wales	4th	3rd	3rd	4th	5th	5th	5th	4th	6th	6th	2nd	3rd	2nd	2nd	6th	4th	4th	4th	5th	5th	4th	5th	6th	4th	6th	6th	3rd	3rd	6th	6th	6th

=== Tables ===
==== Home Nations (1996–1998) ====
Position	Nation	Tournaments	Matches				Points			Table points	Awards			
Position	Nation	Tournaments	Played	Won	Drawn	Lost	For	Against	Diff	Table points	TW	GS	TC	WS
1	England	3	9	8	0	1	255	72	+183	16	2	2	2	0
2	Scotland	3	9	6	0	3	121	66	+55	12	1	1	1	0
3	Wales	3	9	3	0	6	125	184	–59	6	0	0	0	1
4	Ireland	3	9	1	0	8	56	235	–179	2	0	0	0	2

==== Five Nations (1999–2001) ====
Position	Nation	Tournaments	Matches				Points			Table points	Awards			
Position	Nation	Tournaments	Played	Won	Drawn	Lost	For	Against	Diff	Table points	TW	GS	TC	WS
1	England	3	12	12	0	0	491	68	+423	24	3	3	3	0
2	France	3	12	8	0	4	240	141	+99	16	0	0	N/A	0
3	Scotland	3	12	5	0	7	172	246	–74	10	0	0	0	0
4	Spain	2	8	4	0	4	74	135	–61	8	0	0	N/A	0
5	Wales	3	12	1	0	11	77	341	–264	2	0	0	0	2
6	Ireland	1	4	0	0	4	5	128	–123	0	0	0	0	1

==== Six Nations without bonus point scoring (2002–2016) ====
Position	Nation	Tournaments	Matches				Points			Table points	Awards			
Position	Nation	Tournaments	Played	Won	Drawn	Lost	For	Against	Diff	Table points	TW	GS	TC	WS
1	England	15	75	64	0	11	2810	335	+2475	128	8	7	12	0
2	France	15	75	50	0	25	1726	701	+1025	100	5	4	N/A	0
3	Ireland	15	75	35	0	40	1055	1097	–42	70	2	1	2	2
4	Wales	15	75	30	1	44	861	1042	–181	61	0	0	1	3
5	Scotland	15	75	15	1	59	597	2065	–1468	31	0	0	0	7
6	Italy	10	50	14	1	35	579	1216	–637	29	0	0	N/A	3
7	Spain	5	25	6	1	18	156	764	–604	13	0	0	N/A	2

==== Six Nations with bonus point scoring (2017–) ====
Position	Nation	Tournaments	Matches				Points			Tries		Bonus points			Table points	Awards			
Position	Nation	Tournaments	P	W	D	L	PF	PA	PD	TF	TA	T BP	L BP	GS BP	Table points	TW	GS	TC	WS
1	England	10	43	42	0	1	2121	408	+1713	334	60	38	1	21	228	8	6	8	0
2	France	10	42	32	1	9	1460	568	+892	217	76	32	4	3	169	1	1	N/A	0
3	Ireland	10	42	19	0	23	782	1012	–230	120	155	13	3	0	92	0	0	0	1
4	Italy	10	42	14	1	27	749	1292	–543	97	181	12	1	0	71	0	0	N/A	1
5	Wales	10	42	9	1	32	565	1410	–845	84	217	8	6	0	52	0	0	0	4
6	Scotland	10	41	9	1	31	540	1410	–888	77	222	4	7	0	49	0	0	0	2

==== Total ====
Pos	Nation	Tournaments	Matches				Points			Bonus points			Table points	Awards			
Pos	Nation	Tournaments	P	W	D	L	PF	PA	PD	T BP	L BP	GS BP	Table points	TW	GS	TC	WS
1	England	31	134	121	0	13	5406	824	+4582	33	1	27	545	22	20	26	0
2	France	28	124	85	1	38	3227	1343	+1884	28	4	3	377	6	5	N/A	0
3	Ireland	29	125	55	0	70	1873	2279	–406	15	3	0	238	2	1	2	6
4	Wales	31	133	40	2	91	1556	2929	–1373	5	8	0	177	0	0	1	10
5	Scotland	31	132	33	2	97	1346	3657	–2311	2	7	0	145	1	1	1	9
6	Italy	20	87	27	2	58	1151	2346	–1195	11	1	0	124	0	0	N/A	3
7	Spain	7	33	10	1	22	250	899	-645	0	0	0	21	0	0	N/A	2

== Records ==
=== Highest team scores ===
Scores of 80 points or more:

- England v Scotland (89–0) at Twickenham on 8 March 2011
- England v Ireland (88–10) at Twickenham on 20 April 2024
- England v Spain (86–3) at Madrid on 11 February 2006
- England v Scotland (84–7) at Murrayfield on 18 April 2026
- England v Wales (83–11) at Swansea on 10 April 1999
- England v Wales (81–0) at Cardiff Arms Park on 4 February 2005
- England v Scotland (80–0) at Twickenham on 16 March 2019

== Awards ==
=== Player of the Championship ===
The following table outlines the nominees and winners of the Women's Six Nations Player of the Championship Award, which was first presented at the 2020 tournament.

Year	Team	Nominee	Winner	Ref
2020	N/A		(England) Emily Scarratt	
2021	England	Zoe Aldcroft	(England) Poppy Cleall	
2021	France	Caroline Boujard	(England) Poppy Cleall	
2021	England	Poppy Cleall	(England) Poppy Cleall	
2022	England	Sarah Bern	(France) Laure Sansus	
2022	France	Madoussou Fall	(France) Laure Sansus	
2022	England	Marlie Packer	(France) Laure Sansus	
2022	France	Laure Sansus	(France) Laure Sansus	
2023	England	Holly Aitchison	(France) Gabrielle Vernier	
2023	England	Marlie Packer (2)	(France) Gabrielle Vernier	
2023	Wales	Sisilia Tuipulotu	(France) Gabrielle Vernier	
2023	France	Gabrielle Vernier	(France) Gabrielle Vernier	
2024	Italy	Alyssa D'Incà	(England) Ellie Kildunne	
2024	England	Ellie Kildunne	(England) Ellie Kildunne	
2024	France	Romane Ménager	(England) Ellie Kildunne	
2024	Ireland	Aoife Wafer	(England) Ellie Kildunne	
2025	England	Abby Dow	(Ireland) Aoife Wafer	
2025	France	Manaé Feleu	(Ireland) Aoife Wafer	
2025	Scotland	Evie Gallagher	(Ireland) Aoife Wafer	
2025	Ireland	Aoife Wafer (2)	(Ireland) Aoife Wafer	
2026	England	Megan Jones	(Ireland) Aoife Wafer (2)	
2026	France	Pauline Bourdon Sansus	(Ireland) Aoife Wafer (2)	
2026	Italy	Francesca Sgorbini	(Ireland) Aoife Wafer (2)	
2026	Ireland	Aoife Wafer (3)	(Ireland) Aoife Wafer (2)	

== See also ==
- Six Nations Women's U21 Series
- Women's international rugby
- Rugby Europe Women's Championship – competition for other European nations
