= 2010 Women's Rugby World Cup Pool B =

Pool B of the 2010 Women's Rugby World Cup was composed of 2006 World Cup runners-up England, Ireland, United States and Kazakhstan.

== Kazakhstan vs United States ==
20 August 2010

Kazakhstan	0 – 51	United States
	Report	Tries: Nathalie Marchino 5', 73'; Christy Ringgenberg 44', 68'; Ashley Kmiecik 51'; Phaidra Knight 59'; Amy Daniels 70'; Cons: Christy Ringgenberg 6', 45', 52', 69', 74'; Pens: Christy Ringgenberg 4', 35'

Surrey Sports Park, Guildford, South East England
Referee: Nicky Inwood (New Zealand)

KAZAKHSTAN:
FB	15	Aigerym Daurembayeva	(substituted off) 45'
RW	14	Svetlana Klyuchnikova	(substituted off) 11'
OC	13	Olga Kumanikina
IC	12	Amina Baratova
LW	11	Irina Amossova
FH	10	Tatyana Tur	(yellow card) 62'
SH	9	Anastassiya Khamova
N8	8	Anna Yakovleva (C)
OF	7	Irina Radzivil	(substituted off) 60'
BF	6	Alfiya Mustafina	(substituted off) 62'
RL	5	Marianna Balashova	(substituted off) 41' (substituted in) 45'
LL	4	Svetlana Karatygina
TP	3	Tatyana Pshenichnaya	(yellow card) 34'
HK	2	Tatyana Ashikhmina	(substituted off) 72'
LP	1	Natalya Kamendrovskaya	(substituted off) 72'
Replacements:
PR	16	Olga Nikulich	(substituted in) 41' (substituted off) 45' (substituted in) 62'
HK	17	Farida Kalen	(substituted in) 72'
LK	18	Symbat Zhamankulova	(substituted in) 72'
CE	19	Lyudmila Sherer	(substituted in) 11'
FL	20	Makhabbat Tugambekova	(substituted in) 60'
FL	21	Olessya Teryayeva
FB	22	Irina Adler	(substituted in) 45'
Coach:
(Kazakhstan) Valeriy Popov

UNITED STATES:
FB	15	Ashley Kmiecik	(substituted off) 76'
RW	14	Victoria Folayan
OC	13	Amy Daniels
IC	12	Emilie Bydwell
LW	11	Nathalie Marchino
FH	10	Christy Ringgenberg
SH	9	Kim Magrini
N8	8	Melanie Denham
OF	7	Kristin Zdanczewicz	(substituted off) 51'
BF	6	Phaidra Knight
RL	5	Sharon Blaney
LL	4	Beckett Royce
TP	3	Rachel Reddick
HK	2	Lisa Butts
LP	1	Jamie Burke (C)	(substituted off) 64'
Replacements:
FL	16	Kittery Wagner	(substituted in) 51'
PR	17	Farrah Douglas	(substituted in) 64'
LK	18	Stacey Bridges
N8	19	Blair Groefsema
SH	20	Claudia Braymer
CE	21	Melissa Kanuk
FB	22	Ashley English	(substituted in) 76'
Coach:
(United States) Kathy Flores

Touch judges:
Kerstin Ljungdahl (Germany)
Barbara Guastini (Italy)
Fourth official:
Alan Biggs (England)
Fifth official:
Andrea Ttofa (England)

== England vs Ireland ==
20 August 2010

England	27 – 0	Ireland
Tries: Fiona Pocock 9'; Katherine Merchant 37'; Amy Turner 56'; Maggie Alphonsi 79'; Cons: Katy McLean 10', 80'; Pen: Katy McLean 75'	Report

Surrey Sports Park, Guildford, South East England
Referee: Sarah Corrigan (Australia)

ENGLAND:
FB	15	Danielle Waterman
RW	14	Katherine Merchant	(substituted off) 62'
OC	13	Emily Scarratt
IC	12	Rachael Burford	(substituted off) 62'
LW	11	Fiona Pocock
FH	10	Katy McLean
SH	9	Amy Turner	(substituted off) 72'
N8	8	Catherine Spencer (C)
OF	7	Maggie Alphonsi
BF	6	Heather Fisher	(substituted off) 62'
RL	5	Joanna McGilchrist
LL	4	Rebecca Essex	(substituted off) 62'
TP	3	Sophie Hemming
HK	2	Amy Garnett	(substituted off) 62'
LP	1	Rochelle Clark	(substituted off) 62'
Replacements:
HK	16	Emma Croker	(substituted in) 62'
PR	17	Claire Purdy	(substituted in) 62'
LK	18	Tamara Taylor	(substituted in) 62'
FL	19	Sarah Hunter	(substituted in) 62'
SH	20	La Toya Mason	(substituted in) 72'
CE	21	Alice Richardson	(substituted in) 62'
WG	22	Charlotte Barras	(substituted in) 62'
Coach:
(England) Gary Street

IRELAND:
FB	15	Niamh Briggs
RW	14	Amy Davis
OC	13	Joanne O'Sullivan
IC	12	Lynne Cantwell	(substituted off) 62'
LW	11	Nora Stapleton
FH	10	Helen Brosnan
SH	9	Tania Rosser
N8	8	Joy Neville	(substituted off) 75'
OF	7	Claire Molloy
BF	6	Orla Brennan
RL	5	Marie Louise Reilly
LL	4	Kate O'Loughlin
TP	3	Louise Austin	(substituted off) 62'
HK	2	Gillian Bourke
LP	1	Fiona Coghlan (C)	(substituted off) 80+1'
Replacements:
HK	16	Yvonne Nolan	(substituted in) 62'
PR	17	Laura Guest	(substituted in) 80+1'
FL	18	Carol Staunton
FL	19	Sinead Ryan	(substituted in) 75'
SH	20	Louise Beamish
CE	21	Shannon Houston	(substituted in) 62'
WG	22	Mairead Kelly
Coach:
(Ireland) Phillip Doyle

Touch judges:
Kerstin Ljungdahl (Germany)
Barbara Guastini (Italy)
Fourth official:
Alan Biggs (England)
Fifth official:
Andrea Ttofa (England)

== Ireland vs United States ==
24 August 2010

Ireland	22 – 12	United States
Tries: Joy Neville 6', 45'; Niamh Briggs 35'; Tania Rosser 53'; Con: Niamh Briggs 54'	Report	Tries: Jamie Burke 17'; Venesha McGee 73'; Con: Melissa Kanuk 18'

Surrey Sports Park, Guildford, South East England
Referee: Sébastien Minery (France)

IRELAND:
FB	15	Niamh Briggs
RW	14	Amy Davis	(substituted off) 64'
OC	13	Joanne O'Sullivan
IC	12	Lynne Cantwell
LW	11	Nora Stapleton
FH	10	Helen Brosnan	(substituted off) 68'
SH	9	Tania Rosser	(substituted off) 74'
N8	8	Joy Neville
OF	7	Claire Molloy
BF	6	Orla Brennan	(substituted off) 71'
RL	5	Marie Louise Reilly	(substituted off) 64'
LL	4	Kate O'Loughlin
TP	3	Louise Austin	(substituted off) 64'
HK	2	Gillian Bourke
LP	1	Fiona Coghlan (C)
Replacements:
HK	16	Chris Fanning	(substituted in) 64'
PR	17	Laura Guest
LK	18	Caroline Mahon	(substituted in) 64'
FL	19	Sinead Ryan	(substituted in) 71'
SH	20	Louise Beamish	(substituted in) 74'
CE	21	Shannon Houston	(substituted in) 68'
WG	22	Mairead Kelly	(substituted in) 64'
Coach:
(Ireland) Phillip Doyle

UNITED STATES:
FB	15	Ashley English (C)
RW	14	Vanesha McGee
OC	13	Lynelle Kugler
IC	12	Melissa Kanuk
LW	11	Victoria Folayan	(substituted off) 54'
FH	10	Christy Ringgenberg
SH	9	Claudia Braymer
N8	8	Blair Groefsema
OF	7	Kittery Wagner
BF	6	Melanie Denham	(substituted off) 34' (substituted in) 41' (substituted off) 64'
RL	5	Beckett Royce	(substituted off) 46'
LL	4	Stacey Bridges
TP	3	Jamie Burke	(substituted off) 50'
HK	2	Maurin Wallace
LP	1	Farrah Douglas	(yellow card) 30'
Replacements:
HK	16	Lisa Butts
PR	17	Rachel Reddick	(substituted in) 34' (substituted off) 41' (substituted in) 50'
LK	18	Sharon Blaney	(substituted in) 46'
FL	19	Phaidra Knight	(substituted in) 64'
SH	20	Kim Magrini
CE	21	Amy Daniels
WG	22	Nathalie Marchino	(substituted in) 54'
Coach:
(United States) Kathy Flores

Touch judges:
Clare Daniels (England)
Barbara Guastini (Italy)
Fourth official:
Andrea Ttofa (England)
Fifth official:
Sarah Cox (England)

== England vs Kazakhstan ==
24 August 2010

England	82 – 0	Kazakhstan
Tries: Fiona Pocock 4', 54', 63'; Charlotte Barras 10', 22', 79'; Sarah Beale 25'; Katherine Merchant 34'; Rachael Burford 38'; La Toya Mason 44'; Rosemarie Crowley 67'; Amber Penrith 74'; Cons: Katy McLean 5', 11', 22', 26', 35', 39', 45'; La Toya Mason 55', 64', 67', 75'	Report

Surrey Sports Park, Guildford, South East England
Referee: Javier Mancuso (Argentina)

ENGLAND:
FB	15	Fiona Pocock
RW	14	Charlotte Barras
OC	13	Michaela Staniford	(substituted off) 24'
IC	12	Rachael Burford	(substituted off) 52'
LW	11	Amber Penrith
FH	10	Katy McLean	(substituted off) 52'
SH	9	La Toya Mason
N8	8	Sarah Beale
OF	7	Heather Fisher	(substituted off) 70'
BF	6	Sarah Hunter
RL	5	Tamara Taylor
LL	4	Rebecca Essex
TP	3	Rosemarie Crowley
HK	2	Emma Croker	(substituted off) 70'
LP	1	Claire Purdy
Replacements:
HK	16	Amy Garnett	(substituted in) 70'
PR	17	Sophie Hemming
LK	18	Joanna McGilchrist
FL	19	Maggie Alphonsi	(substituted in) 70'
SH	20	Amy Turner	(substituted in) 52'
WG	21	Katherine Merchant	(substituted in) 24'
FB	22	Danielle Waterman	(substituted in) 52'
Coach:
(England) Gary Street

KAZAKHSTAN:
FB	15	Irina Adler
RW	14	Lyudmila Sherer
OC	13	Olga Kumanikina
IC	12	Anna Yakovleva (C)
LW	11	Irina Amossova
FH	10	Tatyana Tur
SH	9	Anastassiya Khamova
N8	8	Irina Radzivil
OF	7	Marianna Balashova	(substituted off) 64'
BF	6	Alfiya Mustafina	(substituted off) 53'
RL	5	Olga Rudoy	(substituted off) 67'
LL	4	Svetlana Karatygina
TP	3	Tatyana Pshenichnaya	(substituted off) 80'
HK	2	Tatyana Ashikhmina	(substituted off) 61'
LP	1	Natalya Kamendrovskaya	(substituted off) 61'
Replacements:
PR	16	Olga Nikulich	(substituted in) 61'
HK	17	Farida Kalen	(substituted in) 61'
CE	18	Amina Baratova	(substituted in) 64'
CE	19	Valentina Nezbudey	(substituted in) 80'
FL	20	Makhabbat Tugambekova	(substituted in) 53'
LK	21	Symbat Zhamankulova	(substituted in) 67'
FB	22	Aigerym Daurembayeva
Coach:
(Kazakhstan) Valeriy Popov

Touch judges:
Sherry Trumbull (Canada)
Andrew McMenemy (Scotland)
Fourth official:
Ed Turnill (England)
Fifth official:
Jane Pizii (England)

== Ireland vs Kazakhstan ==
28 August 2010

Ireland	37 – 3	Kazakhstan
Tries: Niamh Briggs 2'; Joy Neville 16', 68'; Louise Beamish 24'; Orla Brennan 32'; Eliza Downey 42'; Kate O'Loughlin 63'; Con: Niamh Briggs 17'	Report	Pen: Aigerym Daurembayeva 49'

Surrey Sports Park, Guildford, South East England
Referee: Andrew McMenemy (Scotland)

IRELAND:
FB	15	Niamh Briggs	(substituted off) 72'
RW	14	Amy Davis	(substituted off) 60'
OC	13	Joanne O'Sullivan
IC	12	Lynne Cantwell
LW	11	Eliza Downey
FH	10	Helen Brosnan	(substituted off) 60'
SH	9	Louise Beamish
N8	8	Joy Neville
OF	7	Claire Molloy	(substituted off) 53'
BF	6	Orla Brennan	(substituted off) 50'
RL	5	Marie Louise Reilly
LL	4	Kate O'Loughlin
TP	3	Louise Austin	(substituted off) 56'
HK	2	Gillian Bourke
LP	1	Fiona Coghlan (C)	(substituted off) 72'
Replacements:
HK	16	Yvonne Nolan	(substituted in) 56'
PR	17	Laura Guest	(substituted in) 72'
FL	18	Carol Staunton	(substituted in) 50'
FL	19	Sinead Ryan	(substituted in) 53'
CE	20	Jackie Shiels	(substituted in) 72'
CE	21	Shannon Houston	(substituted in) 60'
WG	22	Mairead Kelly	(substituted in) 60'
Coach:
(Ireland) Phillip Doyle

KAZAKHSTAN:
FB	15	Aigerym Daurembayeva
RW	14	Olga Sazonova
OC	13	Valentina Nezbudey
IC	12	Amina Baratova	(substituted off) 41'
LW	11	Irina Amossova
FH	10	Anna Yakovleva (C)	(yellow card) 22'
SH	9	Anastassiya Khamova	(substituted off) 61'
N8	8	Irina Radzivil	(substituted off) 31'
OF	7	Olessya Teryayeva
BF	6	Alfiya Mustafina	(substituted off) 68'
RL	5	Olga Kumanikina	(substituted off) 68'
LL	4	Svetlana Karatygina
TP	3	Olga Nikulich
HK	2	Tatyana Ashikhmina	(substituted off) 36'
LP	1	Natalya Kamendrovskaya	(substituted off) 64'
Replacements:
PR	16	Tatyana Pshenichnaya	(substituted in) 64'
HK	17	Farida Kalen	(substituted in) 36'
LK	18	Symbat Zhamankulova	(substituted in) 68'
FL	19	Kundyzay Baktybayeva	(substituted in) 68'
FH	20	Tatyana Tur	(substituted in) 41'
CE	21	Svetlana Klyuchnikova	(substituted in) 61'
FL	22	Marianna Balashova	(substituted in) 31'
Coach:
(Kazakhstan) Valeriy Popov

Touch judges:
Gabriel Lee (Hong Kong)
Joyce Henry (Canada)
Fourth official:
Jane Pizii (England)
Fifth official:
Catherine Lewis (England)

== England vs United States ==
28 August 2010

England	37 – 10	United States
Tries: Danielle Waterman 4', 38'; Katherine Merchant 30'; Emily Scarratt 51'; Amber Penrith 68'; Maggie Alphonsi 76'; Cons: Katy McLean 39', 77'; Pen: Katy McLean 9'	Report	Tries: Nathalie Marchino 18'; Kim Magrini 24'

Surrey Sports Park, Guildford, South East England
Referee: Nicky Inwood (New Zealand)

ENGLAND:
FB	15	Danielle Waterman
RW	14	Charlotte Barras
OC	13	Emily Scarratt	(substituted off) 65'
IC	12	Rachael Burford
LW	11	Katherine Merchant	(substituted off) 60'
FH	10	Katy McLean
SH	9	La Toya Mason	(substituted off) 50'
N8	8	Catherine Spencer	(substituted off) 55'
OF	7	Maggie Alphonsi
BF	6	Sarah Hunter
RL	5	Joanna McGilchrist	(substituted off) 60'
LL	4	Tamara Taylor
TP	3	Sophie Hemming
HK	2	Amy Garnett	(substituted off) 55'
LP	1	Rochelle Clark	(substituted off) 60'
Replacements:
HK	16	Emma Croker	(substituted in) 55'
PR	17	Rosemarie Crowley	(substituted in) 60'
LK	18	Rebecca Essex	(substituted in) 60'
N8	19	Sarah Beale	(substituted in) 55'
SH	20	Amy Turner	(substituted in) 50'
WG	21	Amber Penrith	(substituted in) 60'
WG	22	Fiona Pocock	(substituted in) 65'
Coach:
(England) Gary Street

UNITED STATES:
FB	15	Ashley English (C)
RW	14	Vanesha McGee
OC	13	Amy Daniels	(substituted off) 61'
IC	12	Lynelle Kugler
LW	11	Nathalie Marchino	(yellow card) 35'
FH	10	Christy Ringgenberg
SH	9	Kim Magrini	(substituted off) 70'
N8	8	Melanie Denham
OF	7	Kristin Zdanczewicz	(substituted off) 60'
BF	6	Phaidra Knight	(yellow card) 60'
RL	5	Sharon Blaney
LL	4	Blair Groefsema
TP	3	Jamie Burke
HK	2	Lisa Butts	(substituted off) 68'
LP	1	Farrah Douglas
Replacements:
HK	16	Maurin Wallace	(substituted in) 68'
PR	17	Lara Vivolo
FL	18	Kittery Wagner	(substituted in) 60'
LK	19	Stacey Bridges
SH	20	Claudia Braymer	(substituted in) 70'
CE	21	Melissa Kanuk	(substituted in) 61'
WG	22	Victoria Folayan
Coach:
(United States) Kathy Flores

Touch judges:
Gabriel Lee (Hong Kong)
Joyce Henry (Canada)
Fourth official:
Ed Turnill (England)
Fifth official:
Claire Hodnett (England)
