= United States women at the Rugby World Cup =

The United States women's national rugby union team has played 42 matches at the Women's Rugby World Cup, from the inaugural tournament in 1991 to 2021. They have competed in every edition of the Rugby World Cup and have made it to the finals three times. The Eagles won the inaugural competition in 1991 and were runners-up in 1994, and 1998.

== By position ==
Rugby World Cup
Year	Round	Pld	W	D	L	PF	PA	Squad
(Wales) 1991	Champions	4	4	0	0	79	6	Squad
(Scotland) 1994	Runners-up	5	4	0	1	387	53	Squad
(Netherlands) 1998	Runners-up	5	4	0	1	200	76	Squad
(Spain) 2002	7th place	4	2	0	2	124	43	Squad
(Canada) 2006	5th place	5	4	0	1	87	47	Squad
(England) 2010	5th place	5	3	0	2	136	82	Squad
(France) 2014	6th place	5	2	0	3	95	139	Squad
(Republic of Ireland) 2017	4th place	5	2	0	3	128	135	Squad
(New Zealand) 2021	Quarter-final	4	1	0	3	65	100	Squad
(England) 2025	Pool Stage	3	1	1	1	98	100	Squad
(Australia) 2029	Qualified							
(United States) 2033	Automatically Qualified as Hosts							
Total	Champions^{†}	45	27	1	16	1399	781	Squad
Champion Runner-up Third place Fourth place: * Tied placing ^{†} Best placing / Home venue

== 1991 Rugby World Cup ==
6 April 1991	United States	7–0	Netherlands	Pontypool

10 April 1991	United States	46–0	Soviet Union	Glamorgan Wanderers

Team	P	W	D	L	PF	PA
United States	2	2	0	0	53	0
Netherlands	2	1	0	1	28	7
Soviet Union	2	0	0	2	0	74

=== Knockout stage ===
12 April 1991	United States	7–0	New Zealand	Cardiff Arms Park

14 April 1991	United States	19–6	England	Cardiff

== 1994 Rugby World Cup ==
11 April 1994	United States	111–0	Sweden	Melrose

15 April 1994	United States	121–0	Japan	Melrose

Team	P	W	D	L	PF	PA
United States	2	2	0	0	232	0
Japan	2	1	0	1	10	126
Sweden	2	0	0	2	5	121

=== Knockout stage ===
17 April 1994	United States	76–0	Ireland	Boroughmuir

20 April 1994	United States	56–15	Wales	Gala

24 April 1994	United States	23–38	England	Edinburgh Academicals RFC

== 1998 Rugby World Cup ==
2 May 1998	United States	84–0	Russia	Amsterdam

5 May 1998	United States	38–16	Spain	Amsterdam

Team	P	W	D	L	PF	PA	Ladder
United States	2	2	0	0	117	16	3rd
Spain	2	1	0	1	44	56	6th
Wales	2	1	0	1	101	35	9th
Russia	2	0	0	2	7	167	16th

=== Knockout stage ===
9 May 1998	United States	25–10	Scotland	Amsterdam

12 May 1998	United States	46–6	Canada	Amsterdam

16 May 1998	United States	12–44	New Zealand	Amsterdam

== 2002 Rugby World Cup ==
13 May 2002	United States	87–0	Netherlands	Sant Boi de Llobregat, Barcelona

18 May 2002	United States	9–21	France	Girona, Barcelona

Position	Nation	Games				Points		Table points	Overall ranking
Position	Nation	played	won	drawn	lost	for	against	Table points	Overall ranking
1	France	2	2	0	0	52	21	6	4th
2	United States	2	1	0	1	96	21	4	5th
3	Kazakhstan	2	1	0	1	49	41	4	11th
4	Netherlands	2	0	0	2	10	124	2	14th

=== Knockout stage ===
21 May 2002	United States	5–17	Australia	Girona, Barcelona

25 May 2002	United States	23–5	Spain	Sant Boi de Llobregat, Barcelona

== 2006 Rugby World Cup ==
31 August 2006	United States	0–18	England	St. Albert Rugby Park, St. Albert

4 September 2006	United States	24–11	Ireland	Ellerslie Rugby Park, Edmonton

8 September 2006	United States	10–6	Australia	Ellerslie Rugby Park, Edmonton

Pool B ⇔ Pool C

Pool	Team	P	W	D	L	PF	PA	Points
B	England	3	3	0	0	119	16	14
C	France	3	2	0	1	75	37	10
C	United States	3	2	0	1	34	35	9
B	Australia	3	1	0	2	88	42	6
B	Ireland	3	1	0	2	48	67	5
C	South Africa	3	0	0	3	20	179	0

=== Knockout stage ===
12 September 2006	United States	29–12	Australia	St. Albert Rugby Park, St. Albert

17 September 2006	United States	24–0	Scotland	Commonwealth Stadium, Edmonton

== 2010 Rugby World Cup ==
20 August 2010	United States	51–0	Kazakhstan	Surrey Sports Park, Guildford, South East England
	Try: Nathalie Marchino 5', 73'; Christy Ringgenberg 44', 68'; Ashley Kmiecik 51'; Phaidra Knight 59'; Amy Daniels 70'; Con: Christy Ringgenberg 6', 45', 52', 69', 74'; Pen: Christy Ringgenberg 4', 35'	Report		Referee: Nicky Inwood (New Zealand)

24 August 2010	United States	12–22	Ireland	Surrey Sports Park, Guildford, South East England
	Try: Jamie Burke 17'; Venesha McGee 73'; Con: Melissa Kanuk 18'	Report	Try: Joy Neville 6', 45'; Niamh Briggs 35'; Tania Rosser 53'; Con: Niamh Briggs 54'	Referee: Sébastien Minery (France)

28 August 2010	United States	10–37	England	Surrey Sports Park, Guildford, South East England
	Drop: Nathalie Marchino 18'; Kim Magrini 24'	Report	Try: Danielle Waterman 4', 38'; Katherine Merchant 30'; Emily Scarratt 51'; Amber Penrith 68'; Margaret Alphonsi 76'; Con: Katy McLean 39', 77'; Pen: Katy McLean 9'	Referee: Nicky Inwood (New Zealand)

Po	Nation	P	W	D	L	PF	PA	PD	TF	TA	BP	TP
1	England	3	3	0	0	146	10	+136	22	2	3	15
2	Ireland	3	2	0	1	59	42	+17	11	6	2	10
3	United States	3	1	0	2	73	59	+14	11	10	1	5
4	Kazakhstan	3	0	0	3	3	170	−167	0	26	0	0

=== Knockout stage ===
1 September 2010	United States	40–3	Ireland	Surrey Sports Park, Guildford
	Try: Victoria Folayan 11', 72'; Amy Daniels 36', 56'; Vanesha McGee 75'; Con: Christy Ringgenberg 12', 21', 37', 57', 76'	Report	Pen: Niamh Briggs 29'	Referee: Sébastien Minery (France)

5 September 2010	United States	23–20	Canada	Surrey Sports Park, Guildford
	Try: Ashley English 30'; Lynelle Kugler 42'; Vanesha McGee 47'; Con: Christy Ringgenberg 43'; Pen: Christy Ringgenberg 16', 20'	Report	Try: 'Heather Moyse 7'; Megan Gibbs 35'; Pens: Anna Schnell 3', 66'; Con: Anna Schnell 8', 36'	Referee: Sébastien Minery (France)

== 2014 Rugby World Cup ==
1 August 2014	United States	17–23	Ireland	CNR, Marcoussis Pitch 2
		Report		Referee: (Canada) Sherry Trumbull

5 August 2014	United States	47–7	Kazakhstan	CNR, Marcoussis Pitch 2
		Report		Referee: (Spain) Alhambra Nievas

9 August 2014	United States	3–34	New Zealand	CNR, Marcoussis Pitch 1
		Report		Referee: (Canada) Sherry Turnbull

Team	Pld	W	D	L	TF	PF	PA	+/−	BP	Pts
Ireland	3	3	0	0	10	80	36	+44	1	13
New Zealand	3	2	0	1	20	127	25	+102	3	11
United States	3	1	0	2	10	67	64	+3	2	6
Kazakhstan	3	0	0	3	2	17	166	−149	0	0

=== Knockout stage ===
13 August 2014	United States	23–20	Australia	CNR, Marcoussis Pitch 1
18:30	Try: Jillion Potter 43', Carmen Farmer 61', Vanesha McGee 68'; Con: Kimber Rozier 68'; Pen: Sadie Anderson 8', Kimber Rozier 79'	Report	Try: Shannon Parry 2', Cobie-Jane Morgan 22', Liz Patu 50'; Con: Ashleigh Hewson 2'; Pen: Ashleigh Hewson 64'; Cards: Michelle Milward (yellow card) 79'	Referee: (New Zealand) Jessica Beard

17 August 2014	United States	5–55	New Zealand	Stade Jean-Bouin, Paris, France
14:15	Try: Kimber Rozier 49'	Report	Try: Aroha Savage 15', Rawinia Everitt 24', Shakira Baker 31', Selica Winiata 34', Honey Hireme 37', 43', 59', 77', Aleisha Nelson 70'; Con: Kelly Brazier 31', 34', 37', 59', 70'	Referee: (Ireland) Helen O'Reilly

== 2017 Rugby World Cup ==
9 August 2017	United States	24–12	Italy	UCD Bowl, Dublin
16:30		Report

13 August 2017	United States	43–0	Spain	UCD Bowl, Dublin
14:45		Report

17 August 2017	United States	26–47	England	Billings Park UCD, Dublin
14:30		Report

Team	P	W	D	L	TF	PF	PA	+/−	BP	Pts
England	3	3	0	0	27	159	44	+115	3	15
United States	3	2	0	1	15	93	59	+34	3	11
Spain	3	1	0	2	4	27	107	−80	0	4
Italy	3	0	0	3	5	33	102	−69	0	0

=== Knockout stage ===
22 August 2017	United States	12–45	New Zealand	Kingspan Stadium, Belfast
16:00 GMT (UTC+00)		Report

26 August 2017	United States	23–31	France	Kingspan Stadium, Belfast
16:00 GMT (UTC+00)		Report

== 2021 Rugby World Cup ==
9 October 2022	United States	10–22	Italy (1 BP)	Northland Events Centre, Whangārei
12:45 NZDT (UTC+13)		Report

15 October 2022	(1 BP) United States	30–17	Japan	Northland Events Centre, Whangārei
17:30 NZDT (UTC+13)		Report

23 October 2022	(1 BP) Canada	29–14	United States	Waitakere Stadium, Auckland
15:15 NZDT (UTC+13)		Report

Pos	Team	Pld	W	D	L	PF	PA	PD	T	B	Pts
1	Canada	3	3	0	0	92	31	+61	16	3	15
2	Italy	3	2	0	1	55	40	+15	8	1	9
3	United States	3	1	0	2	54	68	−14	8	1	5
4	Japan	3	0	0	3	30	92	−62	5	0	0

=== Knockout stage ===
30 October 2022	Canada	32–11	United States	Waitakere Stadium, Auckland
16:30 NZDT (UTC+13)		Report

== 2025 Rugby World Cup ==
22 August 2025	(1 BP) England	69–7	United States	Stadium of Light, Sunderland
19:30 BST (UTC+1)		Report		Attendance: 42,723; Referee: Aimee Barrett-Theron (South Africa)

30 August 2025	(1 BP) United States	31–31	Australia (1 BP)	York Community Stadium, York
19:30 BST (UTC+1)		Report		Attendance: 7,828; Referee: Sara Cox (England)

6 September 2025	(1 BP) United States	60–0	Samoa	York Community Stadium, York
13:30 BST (UTC+1)		Report		Referee: Natarsha Ganley (New Zealand)

Pos	Team	Pld	W	D	L	PF	PA	PD	TF	TA	TB	LB	Pts	Qualification
1	England (Q)	3	3	0	0	208	17	+191	32	2	3	0	15	Advance to knockout stage
2	Australia (Q)	3	1	1	1	111	78	+33	17	12	2	0	8	Advance to knockout stage
3	United States (E)	3	1	1	1	98	100	−2	16	16	2	0	8	
4	Samoa (E)	3	0	0	3	3	225	−222	0	35	0	0	0	

Updated to match(es) played on 6 September 2025. Source: World Rugby
(E) Eliminated; (Q) Qualified for the phase indicated

== Overall record ==
Overall record against all nations in the World Cup:

Country	P	W	D	L	PF	PA	Win %
Australia	5	3	1	1	106	80	60%
Canada	4	2	0	2	94	81	50%
England	6	1	0	5	85	215	16.67%
France	2	0	0	2	32	52	0%
Ireland	5	3	0	2	169	59	60%
Italy	2	1	0	1	34	0	50%
Japan	2	2	0	0	151	17	100%
Kazakhstan	2	2	0	0	98	7	100%
Netherlands	1	1	0	0	94	0	100%
New Zealand	5	1	0	4	42	178	20%
Russia	1	1	0	0	84	0	100%
Soviet Union	1	1	0	0	46	0	100%
Samoa	1	1	0	0	60	0	100%
Spain	4	3	0	1	104	21	75%
Scotland	2	2	0	0	49	10	100%
Sweden	1	1	0	0	111	0	100%
Wales	1	1	0	0	56	15	100%
Total	45	27	1	16	1399	781	60%
