= 2009 Women's Six Nations Championship =

Women's rugby tournament

- Date: 7 February 2009 - 21 March 2009
- Countries: England; France; Ireland; Italy; Scotland; Wales

Tournament statistics
- Champions: England (10th title)
- Triple Crown: Wales (1st title)
- Matches played: 15
- Top point scorers: (Wales) Non Evans (49 points)
- Top try scorers: (England) Emily Scarratt (England) Fiona Pocock (7 tries)

The 2009 Women's Six Nations Championship, also known as the 2009 RBS Women's 6 Nations, was the eighth series of the rugby union Women's Six Nations Championship, due to the tournament's sponsorship by the Royal Bank of Scotland.

England comfortably won a third successive Grand Slam in 2008 and were favourites to make the four in 2009. However, though England did retain the title, it was only on points difference. The loss of key players to the World Cup Sevens was significant in making this an extraordinary championship full of remarkable results such as:

- Ireland beat France for the first time
- Wales beat England for the first time
- Triple Crown to Wales
- Best-ever championships finish for Ireland and Wales
- Worst ever finish for France

The fixtures for the Women's Six Nations ran parallel those of the men's tournament.

== Final table ==
Position	Nation	Games				Points				Table points
Position	Nation	Played	Won	Drawn	Lost	For	Against	Difference	Tries	Table points
1	England	5	4	0	1	237	52	+185	38	8
2	Wales	5	4	0	1	94	69	+25	13	8
3	Ireland	5	3	0	2	88	64	+24	11	6
4	France	5	3	0	2	78	86	-8	12	6
5	Scotland	5	1	0	4	38	161	-123	5	2
6	Italy	5	0	0	5	57	160	-103	7	0

=== Week 1 ===
6 February 2009

Ireland	7–5	France
Try: Fiona Coghlan 73'; Con: Niamh Briggs 73'		Try: Cathy Langenfeld 53'

Ashbourne RFC
Referee: David Jones (Wales)

7 February 2009

England	69–13	Italy
Try: Fiona Pocock 3', 35', 40'; Catherine Spencer 11'; Amy Turner 18'; Victoria Massarella 23'; Emily Scarratt 27', 66'; Charlotte Barras 50'; Amy Garnett 56'; Gemma Sharples 70'; Con: Katy McLean 3', 11' 23', 27', 40', 66', 70'		Try: Silvia Peron 58'; Con: Veronica Schiavon 58'; Pen: Veronica Schiavon 5', 48'

Old Deer Park, Richmond upon Thames, London
Referee: Michael Black (Ireland)

8 February 2009

Scotland	10–31	Wales
Try: Lucy Millard 31'; Con: Sarah Gill 31'; Pen: Sarah Gill 22'		Try: Alison Wright 14'; Melissa Berry 27'; Non Evans 34'; Con: Non Evans 27', 34'; Pen: Non Evans 3', 24', 41', 76'

Howthornden, Lasswade, Midlothian
Referee: Stefano Roscini (Italy)

=== Week 2 ===
14 February 2009

Wales	16–15	England
Try: Melissa Berry 26'; Aimee Young 54'; Pen: Non Evans 12', 80'		Try: Fiona Pocock 15'; Emily Scarratt 33'; Con: Katy McLean 15'; Pen: Katy McLean 76'

Cae Gwyn, Taff's Well, Rhondda Cynon Taff
Referee: Cammy Rudkin (Scotland)

14 February 2009

Italy	17–35	Ireland
Try: Michela Este 31'; Elisa Cucchiella 44'; Paola Zangirolami 58'; Con: Veronica Schiavon 44'		Try: Amy Davis 39'; Fiona Coghlan 54'; Tania Rosser 61'; Niamh Briggs 66'; Grace Davitt 76'; Con: Niamh Briggs 54', 66'; Pen: Niamh Briggs 18', 48'

Stadio Maurizio Natali, Colleferro, Roma
Referee: Laurent Lavin (France)

15 February 2009

France	25–12	Scotland
Try: Claire Canal 22'; Laetitia Estève 40'; Elodie Poublan 68'; Aurore Sobolak 76'; Con: Christelle Le Duff 40'; Pen: Christelle Le Duff 17'		Try: Lucy Millard 33'; Cara D'Silva 73'; Con: Sarah Gill 33'

Stade Dominique Grimaldi, Arras, Pas-de-Calais
Referee: Stephen Lee (England)

=== Week 3 ===
27 February 2009

Ireland	13–29	England
Try: Amy Davis ?? Con: Niamh Briggs ?? Pen: Niamh Briggs ??, ??		Try: Emily Scarratt ?? Francesca Matthews ??, ?? Catherine Spencer ?? Fiona Pocock ?? Con: Katy McLean ??, ??

Templeville Road, Templeogue, Dublin
Referee: Wayne Davies (Wales)

28 February 2009

Scotland	13–10	Italy
Try: Tanya Griffith 40', 66'; Pen: Louise Dalgliesh 68'		Try: Licia Stefan 19'; Con: Veronica Schiavon 19'; Pen: Veronica Schiavon 58'

Meggetland, Craiglockhart, Edinburgh
Referee: John Carvill (Ireland)

28 February 2009

France	27–5	Wales
Try: Clotilde Flaugère 16', 42'; Laetitia Salles 36'; Emilie Moreaux 79'; Con: Aurélie Bailon 16', 36'; Pen: Aurélie Bailon 10'		Try: Non Evans 74'

Stade Sapiac, Montauban, Tarn-et-Garonne
Referee: Mauro Dordolo (Italy)

=== Week 4 ===
13 March 2009

Scotland	0–23	Ireland
		Try: Jeannette Feighery 15'; Tania Rosser 42'; Lynne Cantwell 69'; Con: Niamh Briggs 42'; Pen: Niamh Briggs 22', 29'

Meggetland, Craiglockhart, Edinburgh
Referee: Brendan Fitzmaurice (England)

15 March 2009

England	52–7	France
Try: Emily Scarratt 2', 40', 68'; Margaret Alphonsi 8'; Amy Turner 21'; Charlotte Barras 32'; Fiona Pocock 46'; Katherine Merchant 77'; Con: Katy McLean ??, ??, ??, ?? Emily Scarratt ??, ??		Try: Christelle Le Duff 72'; Con: Aurélie Bailon 72'

Old Deer Park, Richmond upon Thames, London
Referee: Stefano Traversi (Italy)

15 March 2009

Italy	7–29	Wales
Try: Michela Este 80+2'; Con: Veronica Schiavon 80+2'		Try: Naomi Thomas 18'; Mellissa Berry 40', 69'; Non Evans 41'; Catrin Edwards 79'; Con: Non Evans 40', 69'

Stadio Comunale, Mira, Venice
Referee: James Matthew (Scotland)

=== Week 5 ===
21 March 2009

Wales	13–10	Ireland
Try: Jenny Davies 2 Non Evans 7'; Pen: Non Evans 60'		Try: Shannon Houston 48'; Con: Niamh Briggs 48'; Pen: Niamh Briggs 11'

Cae Gwyn, Taff's Well, Rhondda Cynon Taff
Referee: Claire Daniels (England)

21 March 2009

England	72–3	Scotland
Try: Katherine Merchant 4', ??, ??, ?? Charlotte Barras ??, ??, ?? Fiona Pocock ?? Catherine Spencer 68'; Sarah Beale ??, ?? Sarah Hunter ?? Con: Katy McLean ??, ??, ??, ??, ??, ??		Pen: Sarah Gill ??

Old Deer Park, Richmond upon Thames, London
Referee: Patrick Pechambert (France)

22 March 2009

Italy	10–14	France
Try: Maria Diletta Veronese 14'; Con: Veronica Schiavon 14'; Pen: Veronica Schiavon 35'		Try: Amandine Vaupre 28'; Hayate Chrouki 74'; Con: Aurélie Bailon 28', 74'

Stadio Primo Nebiolo, Turin
Referee: Colin Kirkhouse (Wales)

== Scorers ==
Point scorers
Points	Name	Pld	Team
49	Non Evans	5	Wales
43	Niamh Briggs	5	Ireland
43	Katy McLean	5	England
35	Emily Scarratt	5	England
35	Fiona Pocock	5	England
29	Charlotte Barras	3	England
25	Katherine Merchant	2	England
22	Veronica Schiavon	5	Italy
20	Mellissa Berry	5	Wales

== See also ==
- Women's Six Nations Championship
- Women's international rugby
