= 2008 Women's Six Nations Championship =

- Date: 1 February 2008 - 16 March 2008
- Countries: England; France; Ireland; Italy; Scotland; Wales

Tournament statistics
- Champions: England (9th title)
- Grand Slam: England (9th title)
- Triple Crown: England (12th title)
- Matches played: 15
- Top point scorer: (Wales) Non Evans (34)
- Top try scorer: (England) Claire Allan (6)

The 2008 Women's Six Nations Championship, also known as the 2008 RBS Women's 6 Nations due to the tournament's sponsorship by the Royal Bank of Scotland, was the seventh series of the rugby union Women's Six Nations Championship. England comfortably won a third successive Grand Slam—the first time this had been achieved in the Women's Six Nations. However, after a good start against Wales it was not quite as easily won as in the previous year, with Italy, Scotland and Ireland all scoring tries against the champions, something that only France managed in 2007.

While the England win was predictable it was Ireland that surprised many. Historically one of the weakest nations in the tournament, they only went down to narrow defeats to England, France, and Wales, while recording wins over both Italy and Scotland. The result was probably their best ever tournament performance.

The decline of Scottish women's rugby, on the other hand, continued. Though their performance against England showed hope for improvement, two successive defeats in two years to Ireland meant that Scotland ranked for the first time below the Irish, while defeat to Italy—the Italians' first ever Six Nations win—was the final blow in a disastrous campaign.

France—on paper the second best side in the event—were distinctly unimpressive, going down to their largest home defeat to England before losing to Wales for the second time in three years, the result being only third place. Wales, on the other hand, recovered from an English drubbing in the first game to finish in a well-deserved runners-up position.

Finally, the Italians surprised everyone with their Scottish win, following a campaign that had not appeared competitive in its first four games.

== Final table ==
| Pos | Team | Pld | W | D | L | PF | PA | PD | Pts |
|---|---|---|---|---|---|---|---|---|---|
| 1 | England | 5 | 5 | 0 | 0 | 213 | 18 | +195 | 10 |
| 2 | Wales | 5 | 4 | 0 | 1 | 72 | 76 | −4 | 8 |
| 3 | France | 5 | 3 | 0 | 2 | 104 | 72 | +32 | 6 |
| 4 | Ireland | 5 | 2 | 0 | 3 | 66 | 65 | +1 | 4 |
| 5 | Italy | 5 | 1 | 0 | 4 | 48 | 167 | −119 | 2 |
| 6 | Scotland | 5 | 0 | 0 | 5 | 39 | 144 | −105 | 0 |

== Results ==
1 February 2008

| Ireland | 19–0 | Italy |

St Mary's College RFC

2 February 2008

| England | 55–0 | Wales |

London Irish

3 February 2008

| Scotland | 15–43 | France |

Meggetland

9 February 2008

| Italy | 6–76 | England |

Rome

10 February 2008

| Wales | 23–6 | Scotland |

Taff's Well

10 February 2008

| France | 26–17 | Ireland |

Saint-Gratien

22 February 2008

| Ireland | 13–3 | Scotland |

St Mary's College RFC

23 February 2008

| France | 0–31 | England |

Bergerac, Agen

24 February 2008

| Wales | 27–5 | Italy |

Taff's Well

7 March 2008

| Ireland | 10–19 | Wales |

St Mary's College RFC

8 March 2008

| Scotland | 5–34 | England |

Meggetland

8 March 2008

| France | 35–6 | Italy |

Valence, Lyon

15 March 2008

| England | 17–7 | Ireland |

London Irish

15 March 2008

| Wales | 3–0 | France |

Taff's Well

16 March 2008

| Italy | 31–10 | Scotland |

Mira

== Points scorers ==
| 34 | Non Evans (Wal) |
| 30 | Claire Allan (Eng, 6 tries), Veronica Schiavon (Ita, 1) |
| 27 | Estelle Sartini (Fra, 3) |
| 22 | Alice Richardson (Eng) |
| 21 | Katy McLean (Eng) |
| 20 | Louise Rickard (Wal, 4), Céline Allainmat (Fra, 4), Katherine Merchant (Eng, 4) |
| 15 | Danielle Waterman (Eng, 3), Aurélie Bailon (Fra), Michaela Staniford (Eng, 3), Sarah Beale (Eng, 3) |
| 14 | Sarah Gill (Sco) |
| 11 | Grace Davitt (Ire) |
| 10 | Jane Leonard (Eng, 2), Caroline Ladagnous (Fra, 2), Amy Turner (Eng, 2), Charlotte Barras (Eng, 2), Delphine Plantet (Fra, 2), Jess Limbert (Ire, 2), Germaine Healy (Ire, 2), Catherine Spencer (Eng, 2), Tamara Taylor (Eng, 2), Flavia Severin (Ita, 2), Jilly McCord (Sco, 2) |
| 7 | Joanne O'Sullivan (Ire, 1) |
| 5 | Sarah Hunter (Eng, 1), Marie Charlotte Hebel (Fra, 1), Sinead Ryan (Ire, 1), Tanya Griffiths (Sco, 1), Mélanie Gauffinet (Fra, 1), Victoria Massarella (Eng, 1), Joanna McGilchrist (Eng, 1), Margaret Alphonsi (Eng, 1), Sarahjane Belton (Ire, 1), Rachel Poolman (Wal, 1), Clare Flowers (Wal, 1), Giuliana Campanella (Ita, 1), Hayley Baxter (Wal, 1), Heather Lockhart (Sco, 1), Rochelle Clark (Eng, 1), Anaïs Lagougine (Fra, 1), Claire Canal (Fra, 1), Marie Barrett (Ire, 1), Yvonne Nolan (Ire, 1), Joy Neville (Ire, 1), Cara D'Silva (Sco, 1) |
| 3 | Michela Tondinelli (Ita), Niamh Briggs (Ire), Michaela Reed (Wal) |

== See also ==
- Women's Six Nations Championship
- Women's international rugby
