= List of Scotland women's national rugby union team matches =

The following is a list of Scotland women's national rugby union team international matches.

== Overall ==
Scotland's overall international match record against all nations, updated to 20 May 2026, is as follows:

| | Games Played | Won | Drawn | Lost | Percentage of wins |
| Total | 251 | 100 | 2 | 149 | 39.84% |

== Full internationals ==
=== Legend ===
| Won | Lost | Draw |

=== 1990s ===
| Test | Date | Opponent | PF | PA | Venue | Event |
|---|---|---|---|---|---|---|
| 1 | 14 February 1993 | Ireland | 10 | 0 | Raeburn Place, Edinburgh | |
| 2 | 19 December 1993 | Wales | 0 | 23 | Burnbrae, Glasgow | |
| 3 | 13 February 1994 | Ireland | 5 | 0 | Ravenhill Stadium, Belfast | |
| 4 | 14 April 1994 | Russia | 51 | 0 | Boroughmuir RFC, Edinburgh | 1994 World Cup |
| 5 | 15 April 1994 | England | 0 | 26 | Boroughmuir RFC, Edinburgh | 1994 World Cup |
| 6 | 17 April 1994 | Wales | 0 | 8 | Melrose RFC, Melrose | 1994 World Cup |
| 7 | 20 April 1994 | Ireland | 10 | 3 | Melrose RFC, Melrose | 1994 World Cup |
| 8 | 23 April 1994 | Canada | 11 | 5 | Boroughmuir RFC, Edinburgh | 1994 World Cup |
| 9 | 24 April 1994 | Sweden | 60 | 0 | Meggetland, Edinburgh | |
| 10 | 20 December 1994 | Wales | 5 | 0 | Brewery Field, Bridgend | |
| 11 | 20 February 1995 | Ireland | 20 | 3 | Myreside, Edinburgh | |
| 12 | 30 April 1995 | Italy | 10 | 12 | Meggetland, Edinburgh | |
| 13 | 23 September 1995 | Netherlands | 3 | 5 | Amsterdam | |
| 14 | 21 January 1996 | Ireland | 21 | 0 | Blackrock, Dublin | 1996 Home Nations |
| 15 | 18 February 1996 | Wales | 6 | 11 | Bridgend | 1996 Home Nations |
| 16 | 3 March 1996 | England | 8 | 12 | Meggetland, Edinburgh | 1996 Home Nations |
| 17 | 30 November 1996 | Netherlands | 27 | 3 | Meggetland, Edinburgh | |
| 18 | 12 January 1997 | Wales | 10 | 0 | Meggetland, Edinburgh | 1997 Home Nations |
| 19 | 26 January 1997 | England | 3 | 23 | Blackheath Rugby Club, London | 1997 Home Nations |
| 20 | 23 February 1997 | Ireland | 28 | 3 | Pennypit Park, Prestonpans | 1997 Home Nations |
| 21 | 2 April 1997 | Italy | 31 | 7 | Nice | 1997 FIRA |
| 22 | 4 April 1997 | Spain | 11 | 10 | Nice | 1997 FIRA |
| 23 | 6 April 1997 | England | 8 | 24 | Nice | 1997 FIRA |
| 24 | 5 May 1997 | Sweden | 42 | 0 | Stockholm | |
| 25 | 8 February 1998 | Ireland | 15 | 0 | Old Belvedere, Dublin | 1998 Home Nations |
| 26 | 21 February 1998 | France | 19 | 3 | Raeburn Place, Edinburgh | |
| 27 | 1 March 1998 | Wales | 22 | 12 | Cardiff | 1998 Home Nations |
| 28 | 21 March 1998 | England | 8 | 5 | Stewarts Melville, Edinburgh | 1998 Home Nations |
| 29 | 2 May 1998 | Italy | 37 | 8 | Amsterdam | 1998 World Cup |
| 30 | 5 May 1998 | New Zealand | 0 | 76 | Amsterdam | 1998 World Cup |
| 31 | 9 May 1998 | United States | 10 | 25 | Amsterdam | 1998 World Cup |
| 32 | 12 May 1998 | France | 27 | 7 | Amsterdam | 1998 World Cup |
| 33 | 16 May 1998 | Australia | 15 | 25 | Amsterdam | 1998 World Cup |
| 34 | 5 December 1998 | Spain | 5 | 3 | Madrid | |
| 35 | 7 February 1999 | Wales | 23 | 0 | Inverleith Sports Ground, Edinburgh | 1999 Five Nations |
| 36 | 28 February 1999 | England | 7 | 34 | Richmond RFC, London | 1999 Five Nations |
| 37 | 21 March 1999 | Ireland | 22 | 5 | Inverleith Sports Ground, Edinburgh | 1999 Five Nations |
| 38 | 9 April 1999 | France | 18 | 48 | Melun | 1999 Five Nations |
| 39 | 19 April 1999 | Italy | 43 | 15 | Belluno | 1999 European Championship |
| 40 | 21 April 1999 | Spain | 9 | 11 | Belluno | 1999 European Championship |
| 41 | 24 April 1999 | England | 15 | 13 | Belluno | 1999 European Championship |

=== 2000s ===
| Test | Date | Opponent | PF | PA | Venue | Event |
|---|---|---|---|---|---|---|
| 42 | 18 February 2000 | Spain | 9 | 13 | Murcia | 2000 Five Nations |
| 43 | 6 March 2000 | France | 7 | 10 | Edinburgh | 2000 Five Nations |
| 44 | 19 March 2000 | Wales | 36 | 12 | Caerphilly | 2000 Five Nations |
| 45 | 1 April 2000 | England | 9 | 64 | Edinburgh | 2000 Five Nations |
| 46 | 8 May 2000 | Wales | 28 | 6 | Almería | 2000 European Championship |
| 47 | 10 May 2000 | Spain | 10 | 13 | Almería | 2000 European Championship |
| 48 | 13 May 2000 | England | 20 | 40 | Almería | 2000 European Championship |
| 49 | 3 February 2001 | France | 0 | 13 | Stade de France, Saint-Denis | 2001 Five Nations |
| 50 | 18 February 2001 | France | 22 | 0 | Meggetland, Edinburgh | 2001 Five Nations |
| 51 | 4 March 2001 | England | 0 | 39 | Richmond RFC, London | 2001 Five Nations |
| 52 | 18 March 2001 | Spain | 19 | 8 | Melrose | 2001 Five Nations |
| 53 | 3 February 2001 | France | 9 | 6 | Lille | 2001 European Championship |
| 54 | 12 May 2001 | Spain | 15 | 3 | Lille | 2001 European Championship |
| 55 | 11 November 2001 | Sweden | 13 | 3 | Edinburgh | |
| 56 | 24 November 2001 | United States | 22 | 3 | Inverleith, Edinburgh | |
| 57 | 3 February 2002 | England | 8 | 35 | Dunbar | 2002 Six Nations |
| 58 | 16 February 2002 | Spain | 17 | 14 | Barcelona | 2002 Six Nations |
| 59 | 2 March 2002 | Ireland | 13 | 0 | Thomond Park, Limerick | 2002 Six Nations |
| 60 | 24 March 2002 | France | 12 | 22 | Inverleith, Edinburgh | 2002 Six Nations |
| 61 | 7 April 2002 | Wales | 31 | 3 | Stradey Park, Llanelli | 2002 Six Nations |
| 62 | 13 May 2002 | Samoa | 13 | 3 | Barcelona | 2002 World Cup |
| 63 | 18 May 2002 | Canada | 0 | 11 | Barcelona | 2002 World Cup |
| 64 | 21 May 2002 | Spain | 23 | 16 | Barcelona | 2002 World Cup |
| 65 | 25 May 2002 | Australia | 0 | 30 | Barcelona | 2002 World Cup |
| 66 | 24 November 2002 | Sweden | 34 | 3 | Murrayfield Stadium, Edinburgh | |
| 67 | 15 February 2003 | Ireland | 25 | 0 | Gala RFC, Galashiels | 2003 Six Nations |
| 68 | 22 February 2003 | France | 19 | 14 | Évreux | 2003 Six Nations |
| 69 | 9 March 2003 | Wales | 9 | 8 | Meadowbank | 2003 Six Nations |
| 70 | 22 March 2003 | England | 0 | 31 | Twickenham Stoop, London | 2003 Six Nations |
| 71 | 29 February 2003 | Spain | 48 | 7 | Meadowbank | 2003 Six Nations |
| 72 | 6 July 2003 | Sweden | 49 | 5 | Linköping | |
| 73 | 14 February 2004 | Wales | 30 | 10 | Cardiff Arms Park, Cardiff | 2004 Six Nations |
| 74 | 21 February 2004 | England | 7 | 20 | Gala RFC, Galashiels | 2004 Six Nations |
| 75 | 6 March 2004 | Spain | 6 | 5 | Lalin, Santiago de Compostela | 2004 Six Nations |
| 76 | 21 March 2004 | France | 12 | 16 | Murrayfield Stadium, Edinburgh | 2004 Six Nations |
| 77 | 27 March 2004 | Ireland | 17 | 0 | Thomond Park, Limerick | 2004 Six Nations |
| 78 | 27 November 2004 | United States | 6 | 12 | Murrayfield Stadium, Edinburgh | |
| 79 | 4 February 2005 | France | 15 | 22 | Roubaix, Lyon | 2005 Six Nations |
| 80 | 12 February 2005 | Ireland | 15 | 5 | Murrayfield Stadium, Edinburgh | 2005 Six Nations |
| 81 | 26 February 2005 | Spain | 19 | 3 | Anniesland, Glasgow | 2005 Six Nations |
| 82 | 13 March 2005 | Wales | 22 | 5 | Murrayfield Stadium, Edinburgh | 2005 Six Nations |
| 83 | 19 March 2005 | England | 10 | 22 | Twickenham Stadium, London | 2005 Six Nations |
| 84 | 29 June 2005 | New Zealand | 9 | 30 | Ottawa | 2005 Canada Cup |
| 85 | 2 July 2005 | Canada | 9 | 22 | Ottawa | 2005 Canada Cup |
| 86 | 21 January 2006 | United States | 6 | 13 | Gala RFC, Galashiels | |
| 87 | 5 February 2006 | France | 3 | 23 | Murrayfield Stadium, Edinburgh | 2006 Six Nations |
| 88 | 11 February 2006 | Wales | 0 | 5 | Sardis Road, Pontypridd | 2006 Six Nations |
| 89 | 25 February 2006 | England | 5 | 22 | Murrayfield Stadium, Edinburgh | 2006 Six Nations |
| 90 | 10 March 2006 | Ireland | 9 | 0 | Navan | 2006 Six Nations |
| 91 | 18 March 2006 | Spain | 16 | 12 | La Ciudad Universitaria, Madrid | 2006 Six Nations |
| 92 | 31 August 2006 | Spain | 24 | 0 | St. Albert Rugby Park, St. Albert | 2006 World Cup |
| 93 | 4 September 2006 | Kazakhstan | 32 | 17 | St. Albert Rugby Park, St. Albert | 2006 World Cup |
| 94 | 8 September 2006 | New Zealand | 0 | 21 | Ellerslie Park, Edmonton | 2006 World Cup |
| 95 | 12 September 2006 | Ireland | 11 | 10 | St. Albert Rugby Park, St. Albert | 2006 World Cup |
| 96 | 17 September 2006 | United States | 0 | 24 | Commonwealth Stadium, Edmonton | 2006 World Cup |
| 97 | 3 February 2007 | England | 0 | 60 | Old Albanians, St Albans | 2007 Six Nations |
| 98 | 10 February 2007 | Wales | 0 | 10 | Dunbar | 2007 Six Nations |
| 99 | 24 February 2007 | Italy | 26 | 6 | Meggetland, Edinburgh | 2007 Six Nations |
| 100 | 10 March 2007 | Ireland | 6 | 18 | Meggetland, Edinburgh | 2007 Six Nations |
| 101 | 18 March 2007 | France | 10 | 18 | Stade le Bout du Clos, Paris | 2007 Six Nations |
| 102 | 4 November 2007 | Canada | 3 | 45 | Glasgow | |
| 103 | 3 February 2008 | France | 15 | 43 | Meggetland, Edinburgh | 2008 Six Nations |
| 104 | 10 February 2008 | Wales | 6 | 23 | Taff's Well | 2008 Six Nations |
| 105 | 22 February 2008 | Ireland | 3 | 13 | St Mary's RFC, Dublin | 2008 Six Nations |
| 106 | 8 February 2008 | England | 5 | 34 | Meggetland, Edinburgh | 2008 Six Nations |
| 107 | 16 March 2008 | Italy | 10 | 31 | Mira | 2008 Six Nations |
| 108 | 17 May 2008 | Wales | 10 | 27 | Amsterdam | 2008 European Championship |
| 109 | 20 May 2008 | Netherlands | 26 | 0 | Leiden | 2008 European Championship |
| 109 | 24 May 2008 | Spain | 27 | 25 | Amsterdam | 2008 European Championship |
| 110 | 10 January 2009 | Sweden | 32 | 0 | Meggetland, Edinburgh | |
| 111 | 8 February 2009 | Wales | 10 | 31 | Lasswade, Bonnyrigg | 2009 Six Nations |
| 112 | 15 February 2009 | France | 12 | 25 | Arras | 2009 Six Nations |
| 113 | 28 February 2009 | Italy | 13 | 10 | Meggetland, Edinburgh | 2009 Six Nations |
| 114 | 13 March 2009 | Ireland | 0 | 23 | Meggetland, Edinburgh | 2009 Six Nations |
| 115 | 21 March 2009 | England | 3 | 72 | London Welsh, London | 2009 Six Nations |
| 116 | 17 May 2009 | Russia | 84 | 0 | Enköping | 2009 European Trophy |
| 117 | 20 May 2009 | Belgium | 71 | 0 | Stockholm | 2009 European Trophy |
| 118 | 23 May 2009 | Netherlands | 38 | 18 | Enköping | 2009 European Trophy |

=== 2010s ===
| Test | Date | Opponent | PF | PA | Venue | Event |
|---|---|---|---|---|---|---|
| 124 | 6 February 2010 | France | 10 | 8 | Lasswade | 2010 Six Nations |
| 125 | 14 February 2010 | Wales | 12 | 28 | Brewery Field, Bridgend | 2010 Six Nations |
| 126 | 28 February 2010 | Italy | 6 | 6 | Stadio Maurizio Natali, Rome | 2010 Six Nations |
| 127 | 13 March 2010 | England | 0 | 51 | Meggetland, Edinburgh | 2010 Six Nations |
| 128 | 19 March 2010 | Ireland | 3 | 15 | Ashbourne RFC, Ashbourne | 2010 Six Nations |
| 129 | 5 May 2010 | South Africa | 8 | 27 | Lasswade | |
| 130 | 12 June 2010 | South Africa | 17 | 41 | Lasswade | |
| 131 | 20 August 2010 | Canada | 10 | 37 | Surrey Sports Park, Guildford | 2010 World Cup |
| 132 | 24 August 2010 | France | 10 | 17 | Surrey Sports Park, Guildford | 2010 World Cup |
| 133 | 28 August 2010 | Sweden | 32 | 5 | Surrey Sports Park, Guildford | 2010 World Cup |
| 134 | 1 September 2010 | Canada | 0 | 41 | Surrey Sports Park, Guildford | 2010 World Cup |
| 135 | 5 September 2010 | Ireland | 8 | 32 | Surrey Sports Park, Guildford | 2010 World Cup |
| 136 | 3 January 2011 | Spain | 13 | 28 | Madrid | |
| 137 | 4 February 2011 | France | 3 | 53 | Viry-Châtillon | 2011 Six Nations |
| 138 | 13 February 2011 | Wales | 12 | 41 | Burnbrae, Milngavie | 2011 Six Nations |
| 139 | 26 February 2011 | Ireland | 5 | 22 | Lasswade | 2011 Six Nations |
| 140 | 13 March 2011 | England | 0 | 89 | Twickenham Stadium, London | 2011 Six Nations |
| 141 | 20 March 2011 | Italy | 0 | 26 | Meggetland, Edinburgh | 2011 Six Nations |
| 142 | 6 November 2011 | Netherlands | 33 | 10 | Amsterdam | |
| 143 | 5 February 2012 | England | 0 | 47 | Lasswade | 2012 Six Nations |
| 144 | 12 February 2012 | Wales | 0 | 20 | Cross Keys RFC, Crosskeys | 2012 Six Nations |
| 145 | 25 February 2012 | France | 0 | 23 | Stirling County | 2012 Six Nations |
| 146 | 9 March 2012 | Ireland | 0 | 20 | Ashbourne RFC, Ashbourne | 2012 Six Nations |
| 147 | 18 March 2012 | Italy | 12 | 29 | Pagani Stadium, Rovato | 2012 Six Nations |
| 148 | 2 February 2013 | England | 0 | 76 | Molesey Road, Esher | 2013 Six Nations |
| 149 | 10 February 2013 | Italy | 0 | 8 | Mayfield, Dundee | 2013 Six Nations |
| 150 | 23 February 2013 | Ireland | 3 | 30 | Lasswade | 2013 Six Nations |
| 151 | 10 March 2013 | Wales | 0 | 13 | Scotstoun Stadium, Glasgow | 2013 Six Nations |
| 152 | 15 March 2013 | France | 0 | 76 | Stade Bourillot, Dijon | 2013 Six Nations |
| 153 | 20 April 2013 | Netherlands | 7 | 29 | Madrid | 2014 World Cup Europe Q |
| 154 | 23 April 2013 | Italy | 3 | 27 | Madrid | 2014 World Cup Europe Q |
| 155 | 27 April 2013 | Sweden | 63 | 8 | Madrid | 2014 World Cup Europe Q |
| 156 | 2 February 2014 | Ireland | 0 | 59 | Ashbourne RFC, Ashbourne | 2014 Six Nations |
| 157 | 9 February 2014 | England | 0 | 63 | Rubislaw, Aberdeen | 2014 Six Nations |
| 158 | 22 February 2014 | Italy | 5 | 45 | Stadio Parco Urbano, Rome | 2014 Six Nations |
| 159 | 9 March 2014 | France | 0 | 69 | Howthornden | 2014 Six Nations |
| 160 | 16 March 2014 | Wales | 0 | 25 | Talbot Athletic Ground, Port Talbot | 2014 Six Nations |
| 161 | 23 November 2014 | Italy | 27 | 3 | Avezzano | |
| 162 | 7 February 2015 | France | 0 | 42 | Stade Henri Desgrange, La Roche-sur-Yon | 2015 Six Nations |
| 163 | 14 March 2015 | Wales | 3 | 39 | Broadwood Stadium, Cumbernauld | 2015 Six Nations |
| 164 | 1 March 2015 | Italy | 8 | 31 | Broadwood Stadium, Cumbernauld | 2015 Six Nations |
| 165 | 13 March 2015 | England | 13 | 42 | The Darlington Arena, Darlington | 2015 Six Nations |
| 166 | 22 March 2015 | Ireland | 3 | 73 | Broadwood Stadium, Cumbernauld | 2015 Six Nations |
| 167 | 22 November 2015 | Spain | 34 | 10 | Valladolid, Castile and León | |
| 168 | 2 February 2016 | England | 0 | 32 | Broadwood Stadium, Cumbernauld | 2016 Six Nations |
| 169 | 14 February 2016 | Wales | 10 | 23 | The Gnoll, Neath | 2016 Six Nations |
| 170 | 28 February 2016 | Italy | 7 | 22 | Stadio Arcoveggio, Bologna | 2016 Six Nations |
| 171 | 11 March 2016 | France | 0 | 24 | Broadwood Stadium, Cumbernauld | 2016 Six Nations |
| 172 | 20 March 2016 | Ireland | 12 | 45 | Donnybrook Stadium, Dublin | 2016 Six Nations |
| 173 | 18 November 2016 | Spain | 5 | 10 | Scotstoun Stadium, Glasgow | 2017 World Cup Europe Q |
| 174 | 26 November 2016 | Spain | 10 | 15 | Estadio Nacional Complutense, Madrid | 2017 World Cup Europe Q |
| 175 | 3 February 2017 | Ireland | 15 | 22 | Broadwood Stadium, Cumbernauld | 2017 Six Nations |
| 176 | 11 February 2017 | France | 0 | 55 | Stade Marcel-Deflandre, La Rochelle | 2017 Six Nations |
| 177 | 24 February 2017 | Wales | 15 | 14 | Broadwood Stadium, Cumbernauld | 2017 Six Nations |
| 178 | 11 March 2017 | England | 0 | 64 | Twickenham Stoop, London | 2017 Six Nations |
| 179 | 17 March 2017 | Italy | 14 | 12 | Broadwood Stadium, Cumbernauld | 2017 Six Nations |
| 180 | 2 February 2018 | Wales | 17 | 18 | Parc Eirias, Colwyn Bay | 2018 Six Nations |
| 181 | 10 February 2018 | France | 3 | 26 | Scotstoun Stadium, Glasgow | 2018 Six Nations |
| 182 | 23 February 2018 | England | 8 | 43 | Scotstoun Stadium, Glasgow | 2018 Six Nations |
| 183 | 11 March 2018 | Ireland | 15 | 12 | Donnybrook Stadium, Dublin | 2018 Six Nations |
| 184 | 18 March 2018 | Italy | 12 | 26 | Stadio Plebiscito, Padua | 2018 Six Nations |
| 185 | 4 November 2018 | Italy | 0 | 38 | Calvisano | |
| 186 | 27 November 2018 | Canada | 25 | 28 | Scotstoun Stadium, Glasgow | |
| 187 | 1 February 2019 | Italy | 7 | 28 | Scotstoun Stadium, Glasgow | 2019 Six Nations |
| 188 | 8 February 2019 | Ireland | 5 | 22 | Scotstoun Stadium, Glasgow | 2019 Six Nations |
| 189 | 23 February 2019 | France | 10 | 41 | Stadium Lille Métropole, Villeneuve-d'Ascq | 2019 Six Nations |
| 190 | 8 March 2019 | Wales | 15 | 17 | Scotstoun Stadium, Glasgow | 2019 Six Nations |
| 191 | 16 March 2019 | England | 0 | 80 | Twickenham Stadium, London | 2019 Six Nations |
| 192 | 30 September 2019 | South Africa | 47 | 5 | City Park, Cape Town | |
| 193 | 5 October 2019 | South Africa | 38 | 15 | City Park, Cape Town | |
| 194 | 17 November 2019 | Wales | 3 | 17 | Scotstoun Stadium, Glasgow | |
| 195 | 24 November 2019 | Japan | 20 | 24 | Scotstoun Stadium, Glasgow | |

=== 2020–2021 ===
| Test | Date | Opponent | PF | PA | Venue | Event |
|---|---|---|---|---|---|---|
| 196 | 20 January 2020 | Spain | 36 | 12 | Estadio Juan Rojas, Almeria | |
| 197 | 2 February 2020 | Ireland | 14 | 18 | Donnybrook Stadium, Dublin | 2020 Six Nations |
| 198 | 10 February 2020 | England | 0 | 53 | Murrayfield Stadium, Edinburgh | 2020 Six Nations |
| 199 | 25 October 2020 | France | 13 | 13 | Scotstoun Stadium, Glasgow | 2020 Six Nations |
| 200 | 3 April 2021 | England | 10 | 52 | Castle Park, Doncaster | 2021 Six Nations |
| 201 | 17 April 2021 | Italy | 20 | 41 | Scotstoun Stadium, Glasgow | 2021 Six Nations |
| 202 | 24 April 2021 | Wales | 27 | 20 | Scotstoun Stadium, Glasgow | 2021 Six Nations |
| 203 | 13 September 2021 | Italy | 13 | 38 | Stadio Sergio Lanfranchi, Parma | 2021 World Cup Europe Q |
| 204 | 19 September 2021 | Spain | 27 | 22 | Stadio Sergio Lanfranchi, Parma | 2021 World Cup Europe Q |
| 205 | 25 September 2021 | Ireland | 20 | 18 | Stadio Sergio Lanfranchi, Parma | 2021 World Cup Europe Q |
| 206 | 14 November 2021 | Japan | 36 | 12 | Edinburgh Rugby Stadium, Edinburgh | |

=== 2022 ===
| Test | Date | Opponent | PF | PA | Venue | Event |
|---|---|---|---|---|---|---|
| 207 | 25 February 2022 | Colombia | 59 | 3 | The Sevens Stadium, Dubai | 2021 World Cup Repechage |
| 208 | 26 March 2022 | England | 5 | 57 | Edinburgh Rugby Stadium, Edinburgh | 2022 Six Nations |
| 209 | 2 April 2022 | Wales | 19 | 24 | Cardiff Arms Park, Cardiff | 2022 Six Nations |
| 210 | 10 April 2022 | France | 8 | 28 | Scotstoun Stadium, Glasgow | 2022 Six Nations |
| 211 | 23 April 2022 | Italy | 13 | 20 | Stadio Sergio Lanfranchi, Parma | 2022 Six Nations |
| 212 | 30 April 2022 | Ireland | 14 | 15 | Ravenhill Stadium, Belfast | 2022 Six Nations |
| 213 | 27 August 2022 | United States | 17 | 21 | Edinburgh Rugby Stadium, Edinburgh | |
| 214 | 9 October 2022 | Wales | 15 | 18 | Okara Park, Whangārei | 2021 World Cup |
| 215 | 15 October 2022 | Australia | 12 | 14 | Okara Park, Whangārei | 2021 World Cup |
| 216 | 22 October 2022 | New Zealand | 0 | 57 | Okara Park, Whangārei | 2021 World Cup |

=== 2023 ===
| Test | Date | Opponent | PF | PA | Venue | Event |
|---|---|---|---|---|---|---|
| 217 | 25 March 2023 | England | 7 | 58 | Kingston Park, Newcastle | 2023 Six Nations |
| 218 | 1 April 2023 | Wales | 22 | 34 | Edinburgh Rugby Stadium, Edinburgh | 2023 Six Nations |
| 219 | 16 April 2023 | France | 0 | 55 | Stade de la Rabine, Vannes | 2023 Six Nations |
| 220 | 22 April 2023 | Italy | 29 | 21 | Edinburgh Rugby Stadium, Edinburgh | 2023 Six Nations |
| 221 | 29 April 2023 | Ireland | 36 | 10 | Edinburgh Rugby Stadium, Edinburgh | 2023 Six Nations |
| 222 | 30 September 2023 | Spain | 36 | 5 | Edinburgh Rugby Stadium, Edinburgh | |
| 223 | 13 October 2023 | South Africa | 31 | 17 | Danie Craven Stadium, Stellenbosch | 2023 WXV 2 |
| 224 | 20 October 2023 | United States | 24 | 14 | Athlone Stadium, Cape Town | 2023 WXV 2 |
| 225 | 27 October 2023 | Japan | 38 | 7 | Athlone Stadium, Cape Town | 2023 WXV 2 |

=== 2024 ===
| Test | Date | Opponent | PF | PA | Venue | Event |
|---|---|---|---|---|---|---|
| 226 | 23 March 2024 | Wales | 20 | 18 | Cardiff Arms Park, Cardiff | 2024 Six Nations |
| 227 | 30 March 2024 | France | 5 | 15 | Edinburgh Rugby Stadium, Edinburgh | 2024 Six Nations |
| 228 | 13 April 2024 | England | 0 | 46 | Edinburgh Rugby Stadium, Edinburgh | 2024 Six Nations |
| 229 | 20 April 2024 | Italy | 17 | 10 | Stadio Sergio Lanfranchi, Parma | 2024 Six Nations |
| 230 | 27 April 2024 | Ireland | 12 | 15 | Ravenhill Stadium, Belfast | 2024 Six Nations |
| 231 | 6 September 2024 | Wales | 40 | 14 | Hive Stadium, Edinburgh | |
| 232 | 14 September 2024 | Fiji | 59 | 15 | Hive Stadium, Edinburgh | |
| 233 | 28 September 2024 | Italy | 19 | 0 | DHL Stadium, Cape Town | 2024 WXV 2 |
| 234 | 5 October 2024 | Japan | 19 | 13 | Athlone Stadium, Cape Town | 2024 WXV 2 |
| 235 | 12 October 2024 | Australia | 22 | 31 | Athlone Stadium, Cape Town | 2024 WXV 2 |

=== 2025 ===
| Test | Date | Opponent | PF | PA | Venue | Event |
|---|---|---|---|---|---|---|
| 236 | 22 March 2025 | Wales | 24 | 21 | Hive Stadium, Edinburgh | 2025 Six Nations |
| 237 | 29 March 2025 | France | 15 | 38 | Stade Marcel-Deflandre, La Rochelle | 2025 Six Nations |
| 238 | 13 April 2025 | Italy | 17 | 25 | Edinburgh Rugby Stadium, Edinburgh | 2025 Six Nations |
| 239 | 19 April 2025 | England | 7 | 59 | Welford Road, Leicester | 2025 Six Nations |
| 240 | 26 April 2025 | Ireland | 26 | 19 | Edinburgh Rugby Stadium, Edinburgh | 2025 Six Nations |
| 241 | 25 July 2025 | Italy | 29 | 34 | Stadio Luigi Zaffanella, Viadana | 2025 World Cup Warm-Ups |
| 242 | 2 August 2025 | Ireland | 21 | 27 | Musgrave Park, Cork | 2025 World Cup Warm-Ups |
| 243 | 23 August 2025 | Wales | 38 | 8 | Salford Community Stadium, Manchester | 2025 World Cup |
| 244 | 30 August 2025 | Fiji | 29 | 15 | Salford Community Stadium, Manchester | 2025 World Cup |
| 245 | 6 September 2025 | Canada | 19 | 40 | Sandy Park, Exeter | 2025 World Cup |
| 246 | 14 September 2025 | England | 8 | 40 | Ashton Gate Stadium, Bristol | 2025 World Cup |

=== 2026 ===
| Test | Date | Opponent | PF | PA | Venue | Event |
|---|---|---|---|---|---|---|
| 247 | 11 April 2026 | Wales | 24 | 19 | Principality Stadium, Cardiff | 2026 Six Nations |
| 248 | 18 April 2026 | England | 7 | 84 | Murrayfield Stadium, Edinburgh | 2026 Six Nations |
| 249 | 25 April 2026 | Italy | 14 | 41 | Stadio Sergio Lanfranchi, Parma | 2026 Six Nations |
| 250 | 9 May 2026 | France | 28 | 69 | Edinburgh Rugby Stadium, Edinburgh | 2026 Six Nations |
| 251 | 17 May 2026 | Ireland | 5 | 54 | Aviva Stadium, Dublin | 2026 Six Nations |
| 252 | 12 September 2026 | Canada | 26 | 64 | Edinburgh Rugby Stadium, Edinburgh | 2026 WXV |
| 253 | 19 September 2026 | New Zealand | 14 | 66 | Edinburgh Rugby Stadium, Edinburgh | 2026 WXV |
| 254 | 26 September 2026 | Australia | 10 | 30 | Edinburgh Rugby Stadium, Edinburgh | 2026 WXV |
| 255 | 17 October 2026 | Australia | 12 | 56 | Stadium Australia, Sydney | 2026 WXV |
| 256 | 23 October 2026 | Australia | 31 | 38 | Canberra Stadium, Canberra | 2026 WXV |

== Other matches ==
| Date | Scotland | PF | PA | Opponent | Venue |
|---|---|---|---|---|---|
| 2005-07-08 | Scotland | 35 | 0 | Canadian Barbarians | Ottawa (?) |
| 2006-08-13 | Scotland A | 6 | 17 | Ireland | Hawick, Scotland |
| 2009-02-15 | Scotland Development | 0 | 61 | France A | Arras, France |
| 2010-02-06 | Scotland A | 3 | 26 | France A | Lasswade, Scotland |
| 2010-07-18 | Scotland XV | 20 | 15 | Ireland XV | Lasswade, Scotland |
| 2015-01-03 | Scotland | 10 | 43 | Nomads | Murrayfield Stadium, Scotland |
| 2016-10-29 | Scotland XV | 0 | 15 | Wales XV | Cardiff Arms Park, Wales |
