= Clare Daniels =

English rugby union referee (born 1974)

Clare Daniels (born 1974 (age 50–51)) is an English international rugby union referee and is the world's most capped female Test referee.

She has played scrum-half for Tor RFC in Glastonbury for a few years in the late 1990s before the team disbanded and Daniels decided to take part in a training course run by the Somerset Rugby Referees' Society.

Her international debut was on 2 July 2005, when she refereed the Canada Cup match between Canada and Scotland. Since then she has been selected to officiate at Women's Rugby World Cup in 2006 and 2010, 2009 Rugby World Cup Sevens, Women's Six Nations in 2007, 2008, 2009 and 2010 and other tournaments, including some men's matches in National League 2 North and National League 2 South.

After working as a Bath Chronicle sports writer for seven years, Daniels took up a full-time role with the RFU refereeing team as the new Southern Region Referee Development Manager on 2 August 2010.
