= 2007 Women's Six Nations Championship =

- Date: 3 February 2007 - 18 March 2007
- Countries: England; France; Ireland; Italy; Scotland; Wales

Tournament statistics
- Champions: England (8th title)
- Grand Slam: England (8th title)
- Triple Crown: England (11th title)
- Matches played: 15
- Top point scorer: (England) Karen Andrew (44)
- Top try scorer: (England) Danielle Waterman (8)

The 2007 Women's Six Nations Championship, also known as the 2007 RBS Women's 6 Nations due to the tournament's sponsorship by the Royal Bank of Scotland, was the sixth series of the rugby union Women's Six Nations Championship and was won by England, who achieved their second successive Grand Slam. Italy took part in the Six Nations for the first time, replacing Spain.

== Final table ==
| Pos | Team | Pld | W | D | L | PF | PA | PD | Pts |
|---|---|---|---|---|---|---|---|---|---|
| 1 | England | 5 | 5 | 0 | 0 | 183 | 12 | +171 | 10 |
| 2 | France | 5 | 4 | 0 | 1 | 95 | 75 | +20 | 8 |
| 3 | Wales | 5 | 3 | 0 | 2 | 44 | 50 | −6 | 6 |
| 4 | Ireland | 5 | 2 | 0 | 3 | 50 | 73 | −23 | 4 |
| 5 | Scotland | 5 | 1 | 0 | 4 | 42 | 112 | −70 | 2 |
| 6 | Italy | 5 | 0 | 0 | 5 | 35 | 127 | −92 | 0 |

== Results ==
3 February 2007

| England | 60–0 | Scotland |

Old Albanians, St Albans

3 February 2007

| Wales | 10–5 | Ireland |

Taffs Well RFC, Cardiff

4 February 2007

| Italy | 17–37 | France |

Biella

10 February 2007

| Ireland | 10–13 | France |

St Mary's College RFC

10 February 2007

| England | 23–0 | Italy |

Twickenham, London

10 February 2007

| Scotland | 0–10 | Wales |

Dunbar

24 February 2007

| Scotland | 26–6 | Italy |

Meggetland, Edinburgh

24 February 2007

| France | 15–0 | Wales |

Stade Guy Moquet a Drancy, Paris

25 February 2007

| Ireland | 0–32 | England |

Thomond Park

10 March 2007

| Scotland | 6–18 | Ireland |

Meggetland, Edinburgh

11 March 2007

| Italy | 0–24 | Wales |

Rome

11 March 2007

| England | 38–12 | France |

Old Albanians, St Albans

17 March 2007

| Italy | 12–17 | Ireland |

Tre Fontane, Rome

17 March 2007

| Wales | 0–30 | England |

Taffs Well RFC, Cardiff

18 March 2007

| France | 18–10 | Scotland |

Stade le Bout du Clos, Paris

== Leading points scorers ==
| | Name | Nation | Points | Games | Pts/game |
|---|---|---|---|---|---|
| 1 | Karen Andrew | England | 44 | 5 | 8.8 |
| 2 | Daniella Waterman | England | 40 | 5 | 8 |
| 3 | Christelle Le Duff | France | 33 | 5 | 6.6 |
| 4 | Charlotte Barras | England | 30 | 5 | 6 |
| 5 | Naomi Thomas | Wales | 25 | 5 | 5 |
| 6 | Susan Day | England | 20 | 5 | 4 |
| 7 | Lucy Millard | Scotland | 20 | 5 | 4 |
| 8 | Veronica Schiavon | Italy | 19 | 4 | 4.75 |
| 9 | Estelle Sartini | France | 17 | 5 | 3.4 |
| 10 | Margaret Alphonsie | England | 15 | 5 | 3 |
| 11 | Fanny Horta | France | 15 | 5 | 3 |
| 12 | Jeannette Feighery | Ireland | 15 | 5 | 3 |
| 13 | Non Evans | Wales | 14 | 3 | 4.67 |
| 14 | Lynsey Harley | Scotland | 12 | 2 | 6 |
| 15 | Delphine Plantet | France | 10 | 5 | 2 |
| 16 | Joanne O'Sullivan | Ireland | 10 | 5 | 2 |
| 17 | Katy McLean | England | 9 | 3 | 3 |
| 18 | Michela Tondinelli | Italy | 6 | 5 | 1.2 |
| 19 | Georgia Stevens | England | 5 | 5 | 1 |
| 20 | Mel Berry | Wales | 5 | 5 | 1 |

== See also ==
- Women's Six Nations Championship
- Women's international rugby
