= Paula Chalmers =

Scottish rugby union player

- Full name: Paula Chambers
- Born: 8 June 1972 (age 54)
- Height: 1.66 m (5 ft 5 in)
- Weight: 65 kg (143 lb)

Rugby union career
- Position: scrum half
Senior career
Years	Team	Apps	(Points)
- Murrayfield Wanderers
- Correct as of 11 September 2019
International career
Years	Team	Apps	(Points)
–2006	Scotland		
- Correct as of 11 September 2019

Paula Chalmers (born 8 June 1972) is a Scottish former rugby union player who made more than 70 appearances for the Scotland women's national rugby union team.

== International career ==
She played club rugby for Murrayfield Wanderers RFC.

She was representing Scotland at both rugby and hockey until in 1996. After hockey internationals against Ireland and France, she decided it was impossible to continue with both sports at the same level. She opted to pursue playing rugby at international level while limiting her hockey involvement to playing at club level.

She played in the 2002 Women's Rugby World Cup. She was the top points scorer in the 2005 Women's Six Nations Championship with 46 points from five matches. She won her seventieth cap in 2006.

She was selected as captain for Scotland at the 2006 Women's Rugby World Cup. The team finished 6th at the tournament and she scored 27 points during the matches.

== Family ==
Her brother Craig Chalmers won 60 caps for Scotland.
