= Victoria Folayan =

American rugby sevens player

- Born: May 27, 1985 (age 41) Boston, Massachusetts
- Height: 1.66 m (5 ft 5 1/2 in)
- Weight: 72 kg (159 lb; 11 st 5 lb)

Rugby union career
- Position(s): Center, Wing
National sevens team
Years	Team	Comps
- United States

Victoria Folayan (born May 27, 1985) is an American rugby sevens player. She was selected as a member of the United States women's national rugby sevens team to the 2016 Summer Olympics. She was in the squad for the 2013 Rugby World Cup Sevens in Russia.

She graduated from Stanford University, where she studied psychology and drama. She was named 2013 Women's 7s Player of the Year by RugbyMag.
