= Lisa Butts =

American rugby union player

- Born: January 21, 1982 (age 44) Montrose, California
- Height: 5 ft 3 in (1.60 m)
- Weight: 160 lb (73 kg; 11 st 6 lb)

Rugby union career
- Position: Hooker
Amateur team(s)
Years	Team	Apps	(Points)
- Chico State
–	Berkeley All-Blues		
International career
Years	Team	Apps	(Points)
2007-2010	United States	11	(0)
–	USA U-23s		
–	Collegiate All-Americans		

Lisa Butts (born January 21, 1982, in Montrose, California) is an American rugby union player.

After playing 5 years on the U23 National Team, Lisa has played on the USA Women's National Team for 3 years. Lisa was also a 3 time All-American while at Chico State. She was also with the team when they won the national championship in 2001. She made her USA eagles debut against England in December 2007. She was a member of the Eagles 2010 Women's Rugby World Cup squad.

Butts played at the 2011 Nations Cup.
