= 2005 Women's Six Nations Championship =

- Date: 4 February 2005 - 19 March 2005
- Countries: England; France; Ireland; Scotland; Spain; Wales

Tournament statistics
- Champions: France (3rd title)
- Grand Slam: France (3rd title)
- Triple Crown: England (9th title)
- Matches played: 15
- Top point scorer: (England) Paula Chalmers (46)
- Top try scorer: (England) Kim Shaylor (9)

The 2005 Women's Six Nations Championship, also known as the 2005 RBS Women's 6 Nations due to the tournament's sponsorship by the Royal Bank of Scotland, was the fourth series of the rugby union Women's Six Nations Championship and was won by France, who achieved their second successive Grand Slam.

== Table ==
Pos	Team	Pld	W	D	L	PF	PA	PD	Pts
1	France	5	5	0	0	156	25	+131	10
2	England	5	4	0	1	221	23	+198	8
3	Scotland	5	3	0	2	81	57	+24	6
4	Spain	5	1	1	3	32	161	−129	3
5	Ireland	5	1	0	4	33	106	−73	2
6	Wales	5	0	1	4	21	172	−151	1

== Results ==
2005-02-04

France	22–15	Scotland

Roubaix, Lyon

2005-02-04

Wales	0–81	England

Cardiff Arms Park

2005-02-05

Spain	19–17	Ireland

Campo Central Ciudad Universitaria, Madrid

2005-02-12

Spain	10–10	Wales

Orense, Orense

2005-02-12

Scotland	15–5	Ireland

Murrayfield

2005-02-13

England	10–13	France

Imber Court, London

2005-02-25

France	48–0	Wales

Bondoufle, Paris

2005-02-26

Scotland	19–3	Spain

Anniesland, Glasgow

2005-02-26

Ireland	0–32	England

St Mary's College RFC

2005-03-12

England	76–0	Spain

Imber Court, London

2005-03-13

Ireland	0–34	France

Dublin

2005-03-13

Scotland	22–5	Wales

Murrayfield

2005-03-18

Wales	6–11	Ireland

Cardiff Arms Park

2005-03-19

Spain	0–39	France

San Boï de Llobregat, Barcelona

2005-03-19

England	22–10	Scotland

Twickenham, London

== Leading points scorers ==
	Name	Nation	Points	Games	Pts/game
1	Paula Chalmers	Scotland	46	5	9.2
2	Kim Shaylor	England	45	5	9
3	Estelle Sartini	France	43	5	8.6
4	Catherine De Villiers	France	35	5	7
5	Charlotte Barras	England	27	5	5.4
6	Karen Andrew	England	24	5	4.8
7	Sue Day	England	20	5	4
8	Delphine Plantet	France	20	5	4
9	Joanne Yapp	England	20	4	5
10	Ines Etxeguibel	Spain	17	5	3.4
11	Marion Talayrac	France	15	5	3
12	Paula George	England	15	5	3
13	Susie Appleby	England	10	5	2
14	Suzanne Fleming	Ireland	10	3	3.33
15	Melanie Christie	Scotland	10	5	2
16	Fanny Gelis	France	10	5	2
17	Lynn Cantwell	Ireland	10	5	2
18	Lucy Millard	Ireland	10	5	2
19	Agurtzane Obregozo	Spain	10	5	2
20	Lucie Elodie	France	10	4	2.5

== See also ==
- Women's Six Nations Championship
- Women's international rugby
