= Emily Scarratt =

England international rugby union player

Emily Scarratt OBE
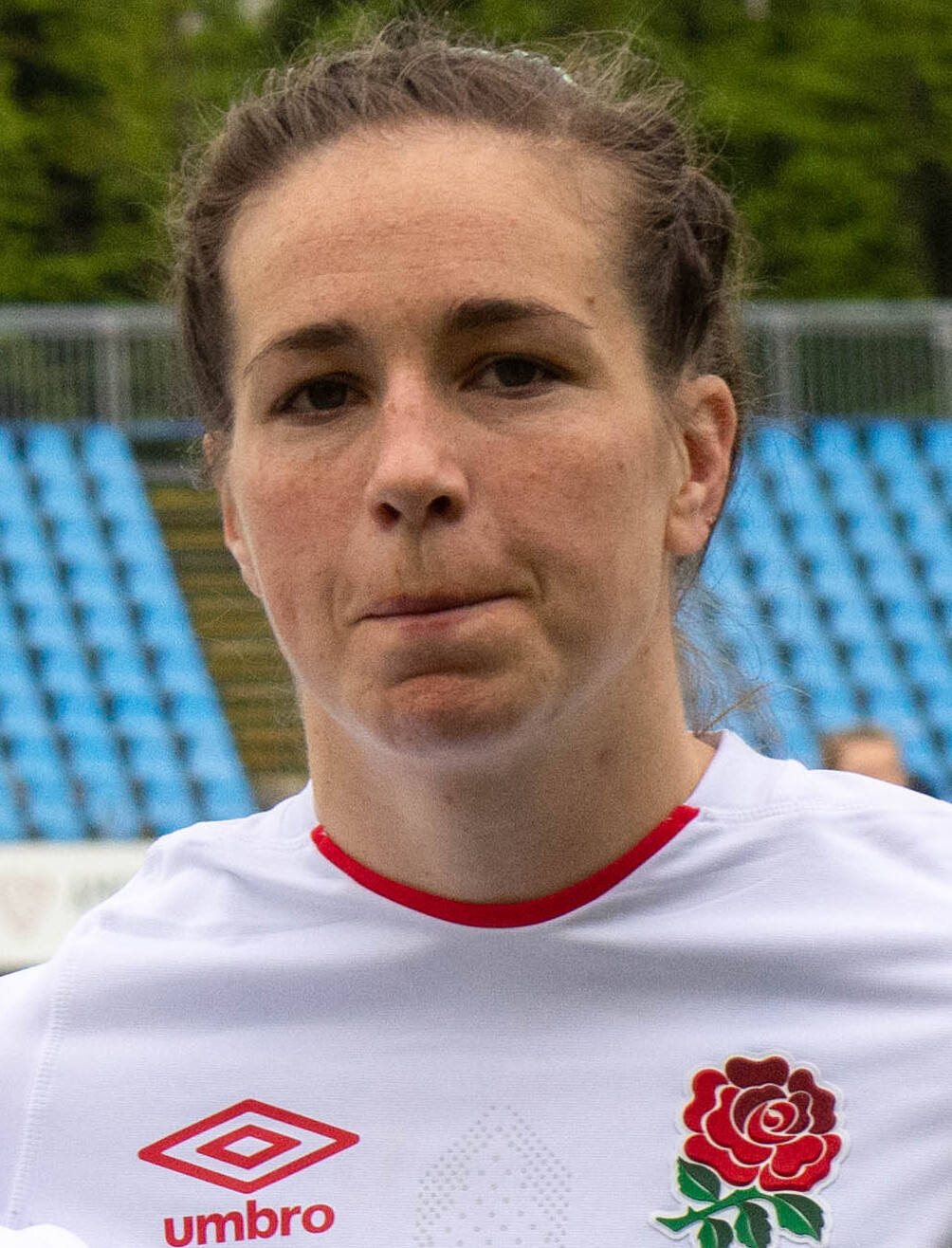
- Scarratt in 2021
- Born: 8 February 1990 (age 36) Leicester, Leicestershire, England
- Height: 181 cm (5 ft 11 in)
- Weight: 77 kg (170 lb)
- School: Bosworth Academy
- University: Leeds Metropolitan University
- Occupation(s): International Rugby Player, Teacher

Rugby union career
- Position: Centre / Fullback
Senior career
Years	Team	Apps	(Points)
2007–2017	Lichfield	--	(--)
2018–2025	Loughborough Lightning	--	(--)
International career
Years	Team	Apps	(Points)
2008–2025	England	119	(754)
National sevens teams
Years	Team		Comps
2015–2018	England		
2016	Great Britain		
Medal record
Representing England
Women's rugby sevens
Commonwealth Games
Bronze medal – third place	2018 Gold Coast	Team competition
Women's rugby union
Rugby World Cup
Gold medal – first place	2025 England	Team competition
Gold medal – first place	2014 France	Team competition
Silver medal – second place	2021 New Zealand	Team competition
Silver medal – second place	2017 Ireland	Team competition
Silver medal – second place	2010 England	Team competition

Emily Beth Scarratt OBE (born 8 February 1990) is a retired English rugby union player. She played centre and fullback for Loughborough Lightning and for England for whom she is the third highest capped player in their history. She is also co-presenter on the popular women's rugby podcast The Good, The Scaz & The Rugby, hosted by Elma Smit and starring Natasha 'Mo' Hunt.

A titan of the game, Scarratt's records include: the most points for a woman's international, the most points in single edition, or career, of a Women's Rugby World Cup, and the most career points in the Women's Six Nations; in addition to being the 3rd most capped player for the Red Roses.

== Club career ==
Scarratt played for Leicester Forest before moving to Lichfield. In 2018, she joined Loughborough Lightning.

== International career ==
Scarratt first played for England in 2008, scoring 12 tries in 12 games and earning comparisons to Brian O'Driscoll. In 2009, she helped England to victory in the 2009 Women's Six Nations Championship and was the joint top try scorer with teammate Fiona Pocock. As England went on to win the next three Six Nations Championships, Scarratt again achieved top try scorer in 2010 and top point scorer in 2011.

In 2014, Scarratt proved to be an invaluable player to England Women, scoring 16 points in the Rugby World Cup final to help England beat Canada to the title. In addition, Scarratt ended the tournament as the top points scorer with 70 points.

She not only plays in the XV's game but also for the Women's Sevens side, for whom she has scored 12 tries and played in several tournaments. In 2016, Scarratt captained Team GB in the Rugby 7s at the Olympics in Rio, finishing in 4th place. She also represented England in the 2018 Commonwealth Games in which the team took bronze, and the Rugby World Cup Sevens in the same year.

Scarratt was instrumental in the England women's team's two consecutive Grand Slams in the 2019 and 2020 Women's 6 Nations Championships.

In 2019, she was awarded the World Rugby Women's 15s Player of the Year and the Rugby Union World Player of the Year (Women's). In the same year she was also awarded a full time England contract.

In 2020, Scarratt became the highest ever England rugby points scorer during the 2020 Six Nations. She was also named Player of the Championship. She was named in the England squad for the delayed 2021 Rugby World Cup held in New Zealand in October and November 2022.

Scarratt was appointed Member of the Order of the British Empire (MBE) in the 2021 Birthday Honours for services to rugby union.

She was called into the Red Roses side for the 2025 Six Nations Championship on 17 March. She was named in England's squad for the Women's Rugby World Cup, making her the first English player, male or female, to play in 5 World Cups.

== Personal life ==
Scarratt, commonly called Scaz by her teammates, was born in Leicester in 1990. She played hockey, rounders and basketball at a young age and was offered a US Basketball Scholarship aged 16 but turned it down.

Scarratt was also a PE assistant at King Edward's School Birmingham, following in the footsteps of fellow England rugby international Natasha Hunt, but like many of her national teammates she left her job in order to become a full-time professional rugby player.

She lives near her Loughborough premiership club with GB Rugby 7s Captain Abbie Brown.

== Honours ==
- 6 Nations Rugby Women's winner 2009, 2010, 2011, 2012, 2017, 2019, 2020, 2021, 2022, 2024, 2025 (All Grand Slams except 2009)
- England Women's Rugby Player of the Year Award 2013
- 2014 Women's Rugby World Cup winner
- 2014 WRWC Dream Team
- 2018 Commonwealth Games bronze medallist
- 2019 Rugby Union World Player of the Year (Women's)
- 2020 Women's Six Nations Player of the Championship
- 2025 Women's Rugby World Cup winner

Scarratt's name is one of those featured on the sculpture Ribbons, unveiled in 2024.
