= Amy Daniels =

American rugby union player

- Born: August 8, 1980 (age 46) Harrisburg, Pennsylvania, U.S.
- Height: 5 ft 10 in (1.78 m)
- Weight: 170 lb (77 kg)

Rugby union career
- Position: Outside Center
Amateur team(s)
Years	Team	Apps	(Points)
- Beantown
International career
Years	Team	Apps	(Points)
2009-	United States	8	(25)
National sevens team
Years	Team		Comps
2005-	United States		

Amy Daniels (born August 8, 1980) is an American rugby union player. She started playing rugby in college when she came to a game as a spectator but ended up playing in that match. She made her debut for the United States Eagles against England in August 2009. Daniels also played in the 2012 Hong Kong Women's Sevens as a member of the US women's sevens team.
