= Joy Neville =

Irish rugby union footballer and referee

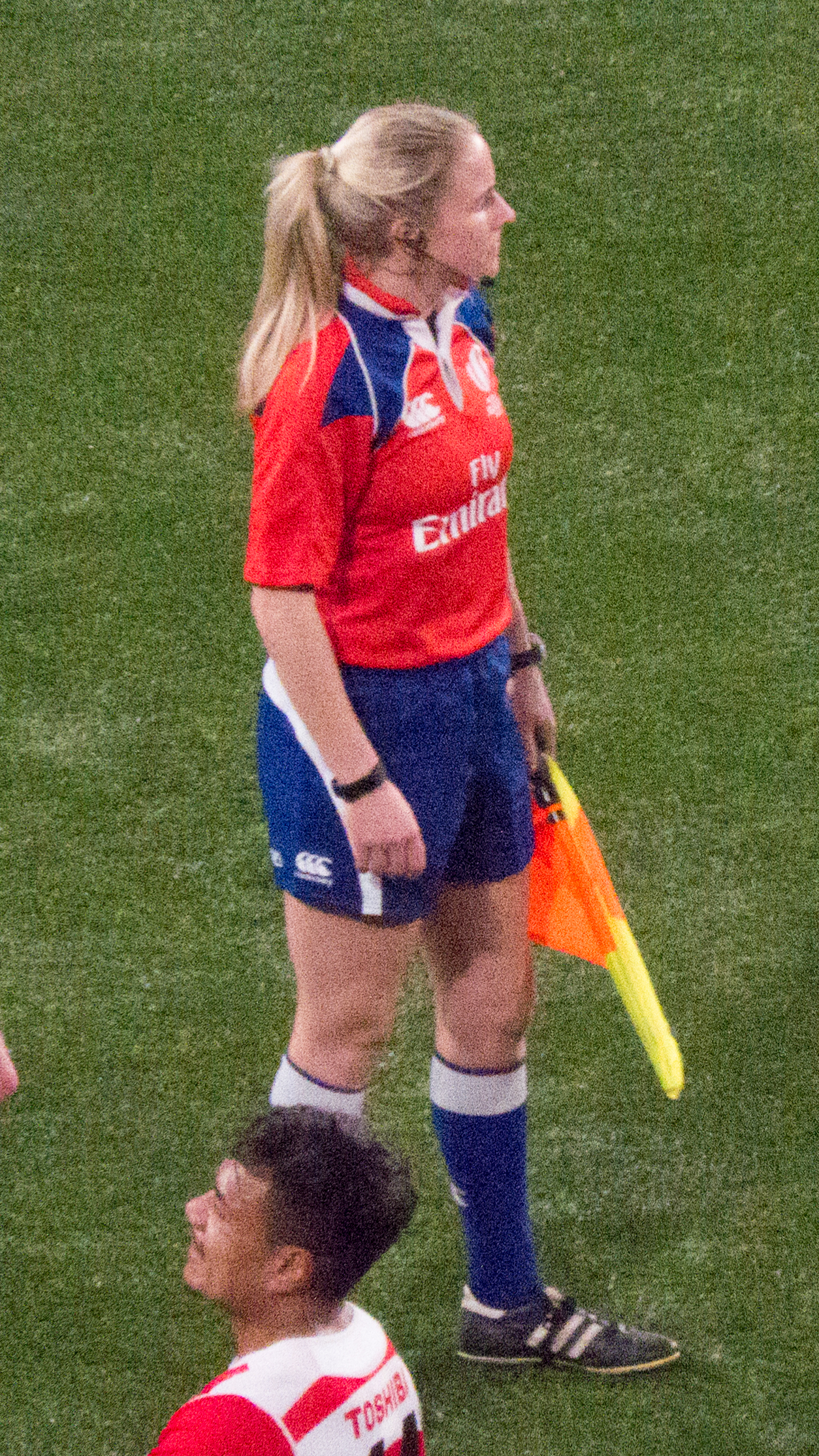
- Neville in 2017
- Born: 24 July 1983 (age 43) County Limerick
- School: Salesian Secondary School
- University: Limerick Institute of Technology

Rugby union career
- Position: Back row/No.8
Senior career
Years	Team	Apps	(Points)
2002–09	Shannon		
2009–13	UL Bohemians		
Provincial / State sides
Years	Team	Apps	(Points)
2003–13	Munster		
International career
Years	Team	Apps	(Points)
2003–13	Ireland	70	
National sevens team
Years	Team		Comps
200x–	Ireland 7s		
Refereeing career
Years	Competition		Apps
2013	Munster Schools Rugby Senior Cup		
2015–	IRFU Women's Interprovincial Series		
2016–	All-Ireland League		
2016–	Serie A		
2017–	British and Irish Cup		
2017–	Excellence		
2017–	World Rugby Women's Sevens Series		
2017–	Welsh Premier Division		
2017–	European Rugby Challenge Cup		
2018–	Pro14		
2016–	Test Matches		
2016–	→ Women's Six Nations Championship		
2017–	→ Women's Rugby World Cup		
- → 2017 final
2017–	→ Rugby Europe Conference		

Joy Neville (born 24 July 1983) is a former Ireland women's rugby union international and rugby union referee. As a player, Neville represented Ireland at both the 2006 and 2010 Women's Rugby World Cups. In 2009 Neville captained the first Ireland team to defeat France. In 2013 she was also a member of the first Ireland women's team to win the Six Nations, Grand Slam and Triple Crown titles.

After retiring as a player, Neville became a referee. She has taken charge of matches in the Women's Six Nations Championship, the World Rugby Women's Sevens Series and the Women's Rugby World Cup, including the 2017 final. In addition to refereeing women's rugby union, Neville has also achieved a number of firsts as a female referee in the men's game. In 2016 Neville served as an assistant referee for a European Rugby Challenge Cup game between Bath and Bristol, making her the first woman to officiate in a professional European rugby match.

In 2016, she became the first female referee to take charge of matches in the national leagues of Ireland, Wales and Italy as well as competitions such the British and Irish Cup, the European Rugby Challenge Cup and the Pro14. After taking charge of a match in the latter competition, she also become the first woman to referee a top-level men's rugby union match in the United Kingdom. After Alhambra Nievas, she also became the second woman to referee a men's international match when she took charge of a 2017–18 Rugby Europe Conference match. In 2017 Neville was also named World Rugby Referee of the Year.

== Early life ==
Joy Neville grew up in the North Circular Road district of Limerick. She was raised in a sporting family and had four brothers. Her father, Ger Neville, played rugby union for UL Bohemians. In 2006–07 her brother, Paul, captained Garryowen to an All-Ireland League, All-Ireland Cup and Munster Senior Cup treble. He also played for Connacht and the Ireland national rugby sevens team.

== Playing career ==
=== Early years ===
Neville attended Salesian Secondary School, Limerick, where she played various sports including basketball, squash, association football, badminton and field hockey. She initially concentrated on basketball and she was a member of a Salesian Secondary School basketball team that won an All-Ireland schools league title. Neville was 16 and working at a local leisure centre when a colleague encouraged her to try women's rugby union. She subsequently started playing for Shannon, who at the time were the only Limerick club with a women's team. In 2009 she switched to UL Bohemians and would also go one to represent Munster, helping them win six Interprovincial titles.

=== Ireland international ===
Between 2003 and 2013, Neville made 70 appearances for the Ireland women's national rugby union team. She captained the team during the 2009 Women's Six Nations Championship, leading the Ireland women to their first win over France. Neville represented Ireland at both the 2006 and 2010 Women's Rugby World Cups. In the 2010 tournament she scored four tries – two against the United States in a 22–12 win and two against Kazakhstan in a 37–3 win. She was also a member of the Ireland team that completed a Grand Slam and won the 2013 Women's Six Nations Championship. During her international career, Neville would also play for the Ireland women's national rugby sevens team.

== Refereeing career ==
=== Early years ===
Between 2008 and 2012 Neville attended Limerick Institute of Technology where she completed a Bachelor's degree in social studies and social care. She also began to work as a director of rugby union at LIT, coaching both men's and women's team. After retiring as a player, Neville was approached by David McHugh, an IRFU referee performance officer, who invited her to become a referee. In December 2013 she took charge of her first game, an U15 friendly between St Munchin's College and CBC. She subsequently began refereeing Munster Schools Rugby Senior Cup matches.

=== Women's competitions ===
By 2015 Neville was refereeing in the IRFU Women's Interprovincial Series. On 20 March 2016 Neville made her debut as an international referee when she took charge of a Women's Six Nations Championship between Wales and Italy. On 26 August 2017 Neville refereed the 2017 Women's Rugby World Cup Final between New Zealand and England. She also served as a referee during the 2017–18 World Rugby Women's Sevens Series

=== Men's competitions ===
On 20 October 2016 Neville served as an assistant referee for a European Rugby Challenge Cup game between Bath and Bristol, making her the first woman to ever officiate in a professional European rugby match. On 12 November 2016 Neville became the first woman to take charge of an All-Ireland League match when she refereed a game between Cork Constitution and Clontarf. On 23 September 2017 Neville became the first woman to referee an Excellence match when she took charge of a fixture between Petrarca and Lazio. She had previously referee in the Serie A.

In October 2017, together with Andrew Brace, George Clancy and John Lacey, Neville was one of seven referees offered professional contracts by the IRFU. On 28 October 2017 Neville refereed a Rugby Europe Conference match between Norway and Denmark. This saw her become the second women, after Alhambra Nievas, to referee a men's international match. Nievas had refereed another match in the same competition two weeks earlier.

On 5 November 2017, Neville became the first woman to referee a Welsh Premier Division match when she took charge of a fixture between Pontypridd and Ebbw Vale. On 15 December 2017 Neville became the first woman to referee a European Rugby Challenge Cup match when she took charge of a 2017–18 pool stage fixture between Bordeaux-Bègles and Enisei-STM. This also saw Neville become the first women to referee a professional European rugby union match. In November 2017, Neville became only the second woman to win World Rugby Referee of the Year, after Alhambra Nievas, who won in 2016. On 9 February 2018 Neville became the first woman to referee a Pro14 match when she took charge of a 2017–18 fixture between Ulster and Southern Kings. This also saw Neville become the first women to referee a top-level men's rugby union match in the United Kingdom.

Neville became the first female television match official (TMO) for a top-level men's rugby union test when she officiated the Wales-Georgia test in the Autumn Nations Cup on 21 November 2020. She was scheduled to also be the TMO for the Scotland-Fiji game a week later, however this game was cancelled due to multiple COVID-19 cases in Fiji's team. Neville continued her TMO officiating of top-level men's rugby union tests and became the first female TMO in the men's Six Nations Championship when she officiated three games (England - Scotland, England - Italy, and England - France) in the 2021 season. At the 2023 Rugby World Cup Neville is set to become the first female TMO at a World Cup.

== Personal life ==
Neville is openly gay. On 21 June 2015 she married her partner Simona Coppola, who is also from Limerick. Coppola works as a project manager for Intel. Neville has stated in interview that she is proud to represent the first country to pass a same-sex marriage referendum.

== Honours ==
Ireland

- Women's Six Nations Championship
  - Winners: 2013
- Grand Slam
  - Winners: 2013
- Triple Crown
  - Winners: 2013

Munster

- IRFU Women's Interprovincial Series
  - Winners: ? 6

Individual

- World Rugby Referee of the Year
  - 2017
- Munster Rugby Referee of the Year
  - 2017
- People of the Year Awards – Sportsperson of the Year
  - 2018
