= Sarah Cox =

British civil servant

Sarah Cox is a British civil servant.

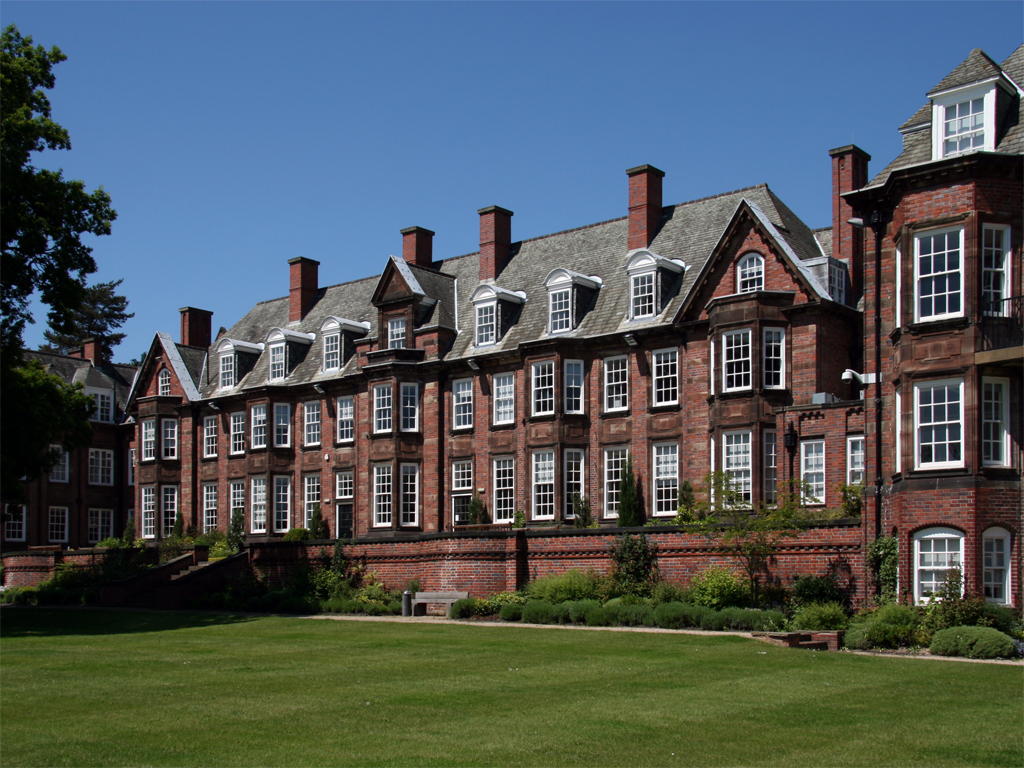
Birmingham University Business School

Sarah Cox graduated from Birmingham University with a BCom degree in Commerce in 1988.

Sarah Cox has been Director of Universal Credit Programme Coordination at the Department for Work and Pensions since 2013. From 2010 to 2012 Cox was Director and Head of Business Planning and Programme Management for London 2012 - the London Organising Committee for the 2012 Summer Olympics and 2012 Summer Paralympics. Cox was Director for Strategy, Planning and Performance in the Cabinet Office from 2004 to 2010.

Cox was awarded the honorary degree of Doctor of the University (DUniv) by Birmingham University in 2012 in recognition of her contribution to the 2012 Summer Olympics and 2012 Summer Paralympics.

She is now the Chief Operating Officer of Ofgem.
