= Jamie Burke (rugby union) =

US international rugby union player

- Born: October 15, 1980 (age 46) Cherry Point, North Carolina
- Height: 5 ft 10 in (1.78 m)
- Weight: 200 lb (91 kg)
- Occupation(s): CARES Program Specialist, American Red Cross and Director of Rugby, Women's Elite Rugby

Rugby union career
- Position: Prop
Amateur team(s)
Years	Team	Apps	(Points)
1998-2003	University of Virginia		
2003-2005	Washington D.C. Furies		
2006-2007	Berkeley All-Blues		
2008-2011	Beantown		
2011-2012	Raleigh Venom		
2013-2014	Glendale Raptors		
International career
Years	Team	Apps	(Points)
2004-2014	United States	51	(15)

Jamie Burke (born October 15, 1980, in Cherry Point, North Carolina) is an American rugby union coach and former player.

== Early career ==
Jamie Burke began playing rugby in 1998 at the University of Virginia in Charlottesville, where she went on to earn All-American Honors in 2000, 2001, 2002, and 2003. In 2003, Burke won the prestigious Woodley Award, given to the top collegiate player in the country.

Following her graduation from UVA, she went on to play rugby for a number of clubs around the country; the Washington D.C. Furies; the Berkeley All-Blues, where she won a Division I National Championship in 2007,; Beantown RFC, where she won two National Championships with the NRU Senior Women All Stars in 2009 and 2010; Raleigh Venom, where Burke helped the team win the 2011 Division II National Championship.; and the Women's Premier League Glendale Raptors.

== International career ==
She made her debut for the USA National Team in 2004 against the New Zealand Black Ferns and has played in the 2006, 2010, and 2014 Women's Rugby World Cups. She was one of the team captains at the 2010 World Cup.

After the 2010 World Cup, Burke received several awards including IRB World Cup Dream Team, Team of the Year and Team of the Decade by Rugby Magazine, ScrumQueens All Star World Cup Team, and Team to Beat the World Champions by Letchworth. She was also named to the Team of the Year in 2011 by ScrumQueens.

In August 2013 Burke earned her 41st cap against England in the Nations Cup, surpassing Eagle great, Patty Jervey, making her the most-capped women's player in the US. On August 13, 2014, during the 2014 Women's Rugby World Cup, Burke earned her 50th cap against Australia, making her the only woman in USA Rugby history to hit that milestone.

Burke finished a graduate degree at the University of New Hampshire, where she has published several articles related to outdoor education and culturally relevant schooling. In 2010, Burke won the Thomas V. Moser, M.D. Memorial Scholarship, given in honor of Dr. Moser to outstanding rugby players pursuing educational goals that maximize their potential.

== Coaching and Administrative career ==
After retiring from playing in 2014, Jamie Burke stepped into coaching. She served as the assistant coach for the Women's Premier League Glendale Merlins' from 2015 through 2020 and when the team re-branded in 2020 took on head coaching duties with the WPL Colorado Gray Wolves, helping guide the team to 4 National Championships, the most of any team in the Women's Premier League. She also served as head coach for the Rugby Colorado Girls High School All-State Team and has recently served as an Assistant Coach with the USA Women's National Team from 2018 to 2023 including the 2021 World Cup (played in 2022). In addition, she travels for USA Rugby as a coach educator and serves on the USA Rugby Board of Directors.

In 2020, Burke was named as the best women's tighthead prop of all time for on-field accolades, as well as inducted into the USA Rugby Hall of Fame. But most recently, she has been honored for her off-field contributions including with a USWRF Lifetime Achievement Award at the 2024 Women's Rugby Coaches and Referee Association annual conference in Arlington, VA and as part of the 2025 Cohort of the Capgemini Women in Rugby Leadership program

In 2024, Burke was named the Director of Rugby for Women's Elite Rugby (WER) ahead of the inaugural season for America's first professional women's rugby league.
