= Nathalie Marchino =

- Born: Nathalie Nicole Viviane Marchino Urrutia; July 27, 1981 (age 45); Cali, Valle del Cauca, Colombia
- Education: Sacred Heart High School
- Alma mater: Siena College
- Height: 5 ft 7 in (170 cm)
- Weight: 150 lb (68 kg)

Rugby union career
- Position(s): Wing, Fly half, Centre
International career
Years	Team	Apps	(Points)
2010-	United States		
National sevens teams
Years	Team		Comps
2013-	United States 7s		
2016	Colombia 7s		

Nathalie Marchino (born July 27, 1981) is a Colombian and a former United States rugby union player.

== Biography ==
Marchino was born in Colombia, her mother's native country, and grew up in Switzerland, where her father was born. She moved to the United States in 1998, attending high school for two years before entering Siena College in New York. She first played rugby in 2005, joining the Washington D.C. Furies club. After moving to California, she played with the Berkley All Blues club.

Marchino represented the U.S. women's rugby union team at the 2010 and 2014 Women's Rugby World Cup. She also represented the U.S. women's rugby sevens team at the 2013 Rugby World Cup Sevens, earning a Bronze medal.

She initially was going to play for the United States at the 2016 Summer Olympics but because of the different eligibility rules between World Rugby and the International Olympic Committee she was not able to because she did not have U.S. citizenship. She was named in Colombia's women's sevens team for the 2016 Summer Olympics.

As of 2016, Marchino was a sales account manager for Twitter.

She famously hates bananas.
