= Nicknames of Boston =

Slang terms for the city in Massachusetts, United States

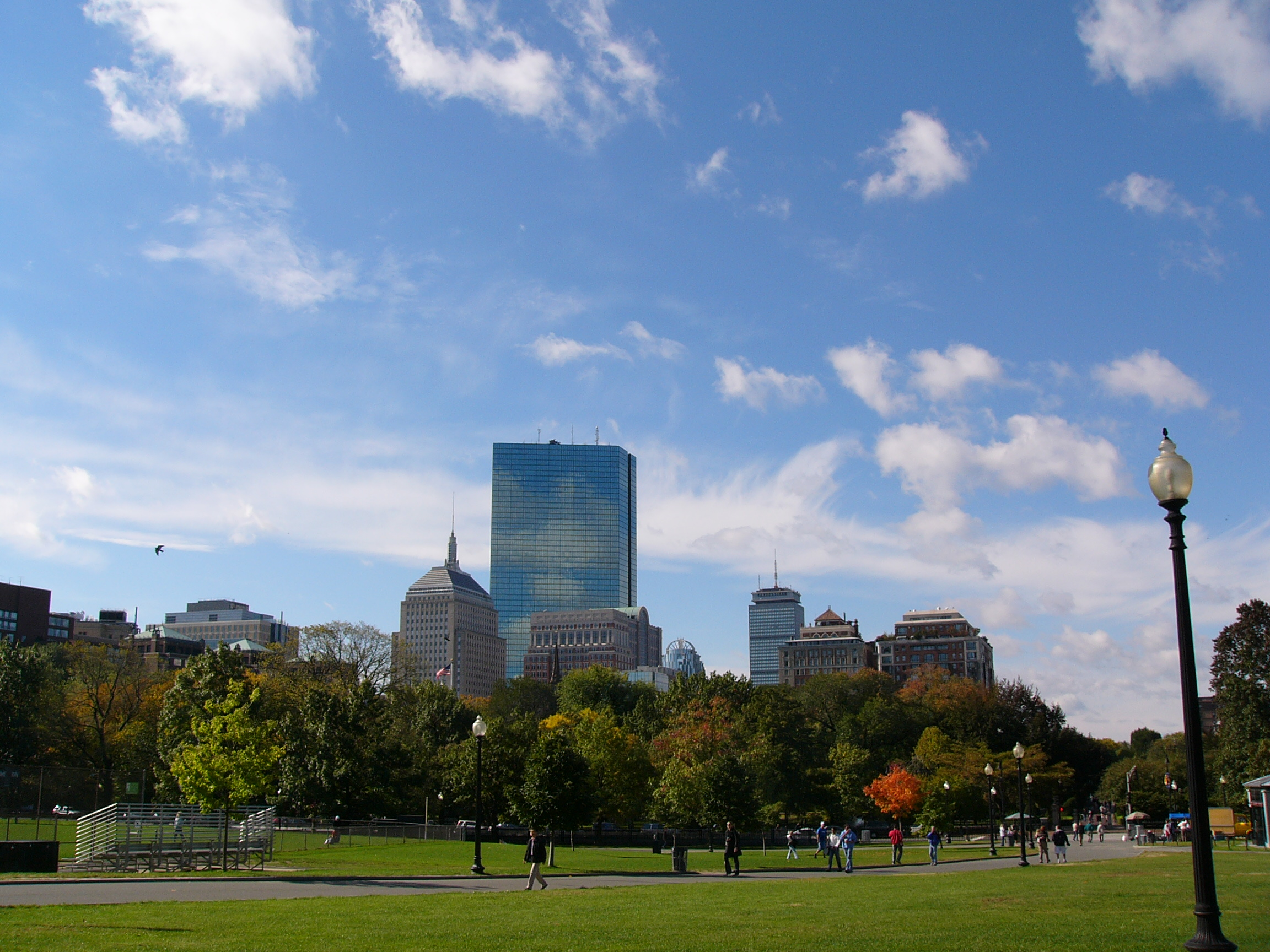
Boston Common

Boston has many nicknames, inspired by various historical contexts. They include:

The City on a Hill
Came from governor John Winthrop's goal, of the original Massachusetts Bay Colony, to create the biblical "City on a Hill." It also refers to the original three hills of Boston.
The City by the Bay
Comes from its location facing Massachusetts Bay and serving as the capital of the original Massachusetts Bay Colony.
The Hub
is a shortened form of a phrase recorded by writer Oliver Wendell Holmes, The Hub of the Solar System. This has since developed into The Hub of the Universe.
The Athens of America
is a title given by William Tudor, co-founder of the North American Review, for Boston's great cultural and intellectual influence. Also a nickname of Philadelphia.
The Puritan City
Was given in reference to the religion of the city's founders.
The Cradle of Liberty
Derives from Boston's role in instigating the American Revolution. Also, a nickname of Philadelphia.
City of Notions
Was coined at least as early as 1823.
America's Walking City
Was given due to Boston's compact nature and high population density, which have made walking an effective and popular mode of transit in the city.
Beantown
Refers to the regional dish of Boston baked beans. In colonial days, a favorite Boston food was beans slow-baked in molasses.
Titletown
Refers to Boston's historic success in certain sports, specifically the Boston Celtics, who have won an NBA record 18 championships, and the New England Patriots, who have won six Super Bowl titles.
City of Champions
Much like Titletown—refers to Boston's history of success in certain sports, with the Boston Red Sox, Boston Celtics, Boston Bruins, and New England Patriots each having won more than one national championship.
The Olde Towne
Comes from the fact that Boston is one of the oldest cities in the United States. It is also used in reference to the Boston Red Sox (The Olde Towne Team).
City of Neighborhoods
Boston is sometimes called a "city of neighborhoods" because of the profusion of diverse subsections.

== See also ==
- Nicknames of New York City
- Nicknames of Philadelphia
