= Nicky Inwood =

NZ international rugby union player

- Born: January 24, 1970 (age 56)
- Height: 1.57 m (5 ft 2 in)

Rugby union career
- Position: Hooker
Provincial / State sides
Years	Team	Apps	(Points)
- Canterbury
International career
Years	Team	Apps	(Points)
1989–1991	New Zealand	10	

Nicola Inwood (born 24 January 1970) is a rugby union referee and former player. She made her debut for New Zealand in 1989. She competed at the 1991 Rugby World Cup.

== Career ==
Inwood began her refereeing career in 1999, her first international match as a referee was between the United States and the Netherlands at the 2002 World Cup. She also refereed at the 2006 and 2010 Women's Rugby World Cup.

In 2007, she made history as the first woman to officiate a Six Nations women's match and the first woman to referee at Twickenham. The match was the curtain-raiser to the men's Six Nations, and was between the same nations, England and Italy.

Inwood has also refereed women's sevens matches in Hong Kong and Wellington. She was selected to the International Rugby Board's first women's referee panel in 2011.
