= Phaidra Knight =

American rugby union footballer and coach

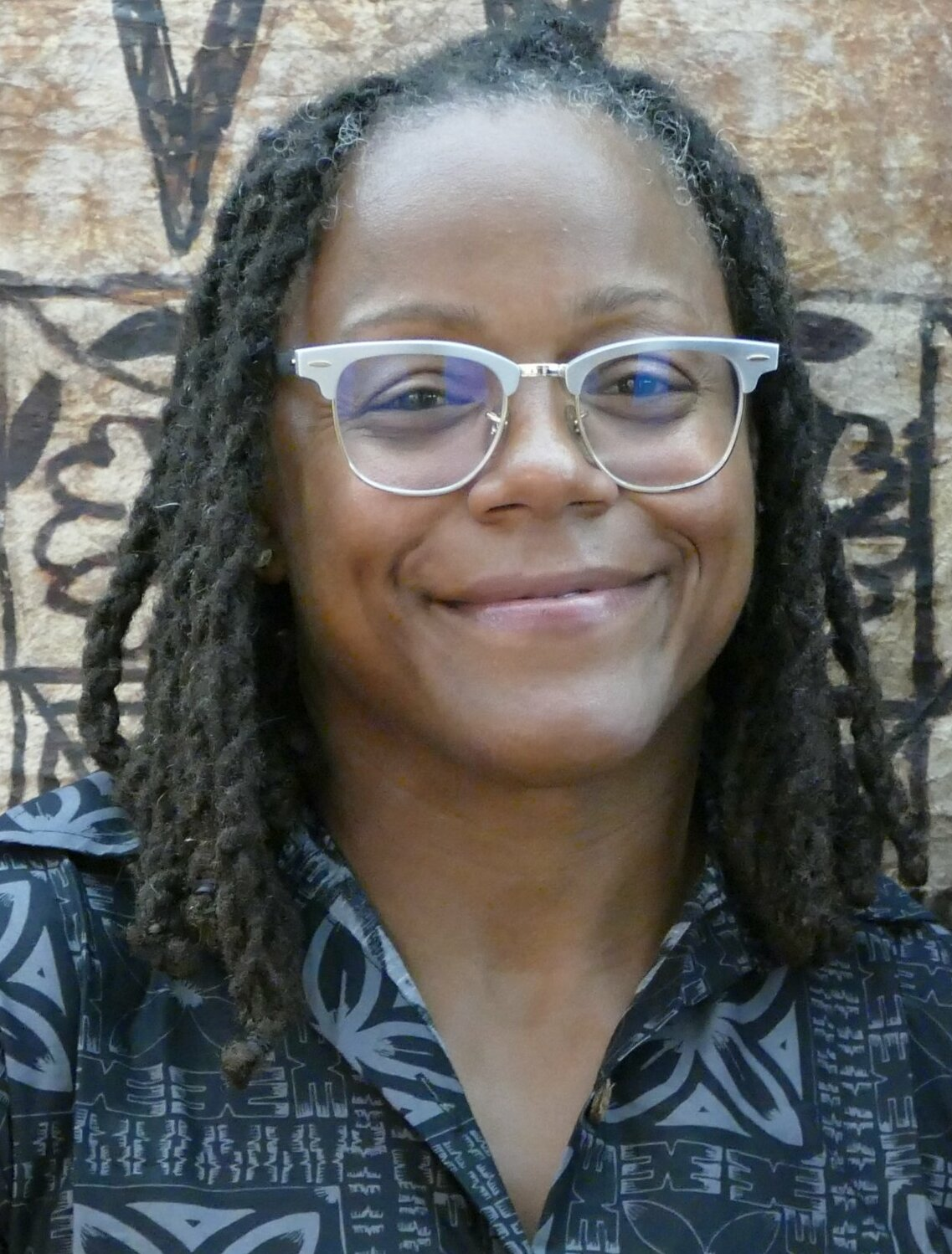
- Born: July 4, 1974 (age 52)
- Height: 5 ft 5 in (1.65 m)
- Weight: 170 lb (77 kg; 12 st 2 lb)

Rugby union career
- Position: Flanker
International career
Years	Team	Apps	(Points)
1999-2017	United States	33	
National sevens team
Years	Team		Comps
	United States		8

Phaidra Knight (born July 4, 1974) is an American former rugby union footballer who was a member of the United States national team from 1999 to 2017. She participated in the 2002, 2006, and 2010 Women's Rugby World Cup, and won All-World Team honors in the first two World Cups.

She was named USA Rugby's Player of the Decade in 2010. On October 26, 2017, World Rugby announced that she would be inducted into the World Rugby Hall of Fame on November 10 of that year, with the ceremony held at the Hall's facility in Rugby, England. Knight is an open lesbian sportswoman.

== Early life ==
Knight was born on July 4, 1974. She grew up on her family's farm near the small town of Irwinton, Georgia. At the age of four, Knight began helping out on the farm in the summer, picking vegetables and hoisting pigs into the trucks. Working on the farm did not get in the way for young Knight to play sports. Knight began playing basketball at the young age of four. She was able to use a portion of her family's field as a basketball court, with her uncle (a basketball player) installing a basketball hoop for her.

Although she was already playing basketball Knight had always wanted to play on the midget league football team, but girls were not allowed to play. In her efforts to be as close to the game of football as she could, she joined the midget league cheer leading squad instead.

Knight began playing organized sports in middle school, joining the basketball team. She would continue on to play Varsity Basketball in High School along with Varsity Tennis.

== Rugby ==
After graduating from Wilkinson County High School, Knight went to college at Alabama State University. Knight put aside sports in college to focus on her academics and dream of going to law school. She would go on to attend the University of Wisconsin Law School. Knight entered law school with the intention of getting back into competitive sports, with the intention of trying out for their basketball team.

"I met a young lady at a party and she invited me to try out for rugby," Knight recalled. "I'd never heard of rugby. She characterized it as being like football and soccer. Then she said 'tackle' and I was like 'I'm there.' I went to a practice the next week, and that was it."

Knight graduated from Wisconsin Law in 1999, making her first U.S. Rugby Team that same year. She played with the USA Rugby team for 12 years, from 1999 to 2013. Recognized as one of the best players in the world in two different positions (prop and flanker). Knight has made three world cup appearances with the USA Women's Rugby team in 2002, 2006 and 2010.

=== Honors and recognition ===
- 2003, the only American named to the 2003 World XV team
- 2002, World Cup All-World Team honors
- 2006, World Cup All-World Team honors
- 2010, named USA Rugby Player of the Decade
- 2010, Travel & Training Fund Grant recipient from The Women's Sports Foundation
- 2010, appeared on MTV's Made as a rugby coach
- 2017, Inducted into World Rugby Hall of Fame

== Bobsled ==
In 2013, Knight pursued a new goal. She was vying for a spot on the U.S. Bobsled team, with dreams of competing in the 2014 Winter Olympics in Sochi. Although she trained immensely, including time at the Lake Placid training center, she did not make the team.

== Coaching career ==
In 2016, Knight began coaching women's rugby. She joined the staff of Princeton University's Women's Rugby Football Clubs as Forwards Coach for the Fall 2016 season. Launching in the Fall of 2017, Knight was appointed Coach of the Women's Rugby Program at Monroe College, a new program that Knight will be spearheading.
