= Amy Turner (rugby union, born July 1984) =

England international rugby union player

- Born: 31 July 1984 (age 42)
- Height: 1.61 m (5 ft 3 1/2 in)
- Weight: 80 kg (176 lb)

Rugby union career
- Position: Scrum Half/ centre/ Hooker
International career
Years	Team	Apps	(Points)
2005–2012	England	59	(60)
Medal record
Representing England
Women's rugby union
Rugby World Cup
Silver medal – second place	2010 England	Team competition
Silver medal – second place	2006 Canada	Team competition

Amy Rheannon Turner (born 31 July 1984) is an English rugby union player.

== Playing career ==
She represented England at the 2006 and 2010 Women's Rugby World Cup. She started playing rugby at the age of 5. She returned from injury for England's match against Ireland in their 2010 Women's Six Nations Championship match.
