= Sarah Beale =

England international rugby union player

- Born: 12 July 1982 (age 44) Cambridge, Cambridgeshire, England
- Height: 1.8 m (5 ft 11 in)
- Weight: 78 kg (172 lb; 12 st 4 lb)

Rugby union career
- Position: Lock/No. 8
Senior career
Years	Team	Apps	(Points)
- Lichfield
International career
Years	Team	Apps	(Points)
2007-2010	England		
Medal record
Representing England
Women's rugby union
Rugby World Cup
Silver medal – second place	2010 England	Team competition

Sarah Elizabeth Beale (born 12 July 1982) is an English female rugby union player. She represented England at the 2010 Women's Rugby World Cup. Beale made her test debut in 2007 and before that represented England Students in 2003, the Academy the following year and England A in 2005. In 2010, Beale was diagnosed with muscular cancer, after a successful surgery she proved herself and was selected to play in the 2010 Women's Rugby World Cup.

In 2018, Beale achieved her goal of competing at her second World Championship level event, at the 70.3 Ironman World Championships in Port Elizabeth, South Africa.
