= Tania Rosser =

New Zealand-born Irish rugby union player

- Born: 15 April 1978 (age 48)
- Height: 1.65 m (5 ft 5 in)
- Weight: 64 kg (141 lb)

Rugby union career
- Position: Scrumhalf
Senior career
Years	Team	Apps	(Points)
- Blackrock
International career
Years	Team	Apps	(Points)
	Ireland	58	

Tania Rosser (born 15 April 1978) is a New Zealand-born Irish rugby union player. She played in the 2014 Women's Rugby World Cup for Ireland. She has featured in three World Cup's including the 2014 World Cup. She earned her 50th cap when they defeated the Black Ferns.

Tania has also represented Ireland at netball and will be featuring in the Irish Mixed Touch Team at the 2016 European Championship in July.

Tania represented the Irish touch rugby team in Malaysian World Cup 2018 where her team with Billy Ngawini came in sixth place.

At the end of 2021 Tania was announced the head coach of The Leinster Women's team, being the first female head coach in Leinster.

In 2022 Tania is organising the Irish youths' Touch, The under 15s Irish Mix team which her son Serge Broughton plays and is one day going to be up there with the legends like Peter Walters. The under 18 men's and under 18 girls'. Manager for the Irish Mix Open with head coach Billy Ngawini.
