= Fiona Pocock =

England international rugby union player

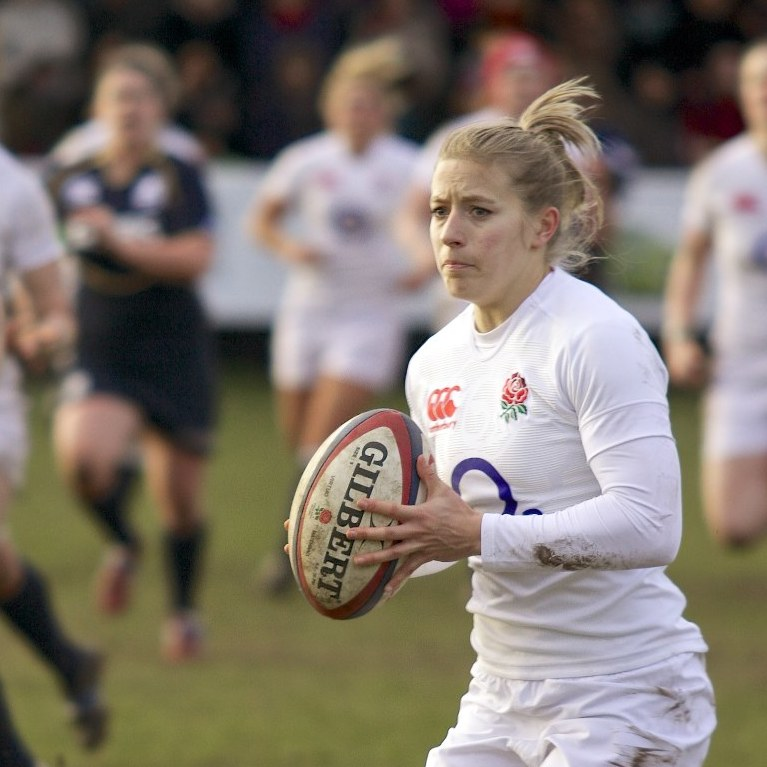
- Born: 15 June 1989 (age 37) Northampton
- Height: 1.63 m (5 ft 4 in)
- Weight: 63 kg (139 lb; 9 st 13 lb)

Rugby union career
- Position(s): Wing, Fullback
Senior career
Years	Team	Apps	(Points)
- Harlequins
International career
Years	Team	Apps	(Points)
	England	32	
Coaching career
- Years: Team
- 2012: East London Women’s RFC
Medal record
Representing England
Women's rugby union
Rugby World Cup
Silver medal – second place	2010 England	Team competition

Fiona Alice "Feepo" Pocock is an English female rugby union player. She represented England at the 2010 Women's Rugby World Cup. Pocock missed out on the final after sustaining an injury in the semi-finals match against Australia.

As of 2012 she coaches the East London Women’s RFC team. Pocock returned to play for England in 2015. By 2017 she had made 32 appearances for England.

Pocock attended Churcher's College.
