= Katherine Merchant =

England international rugby union player

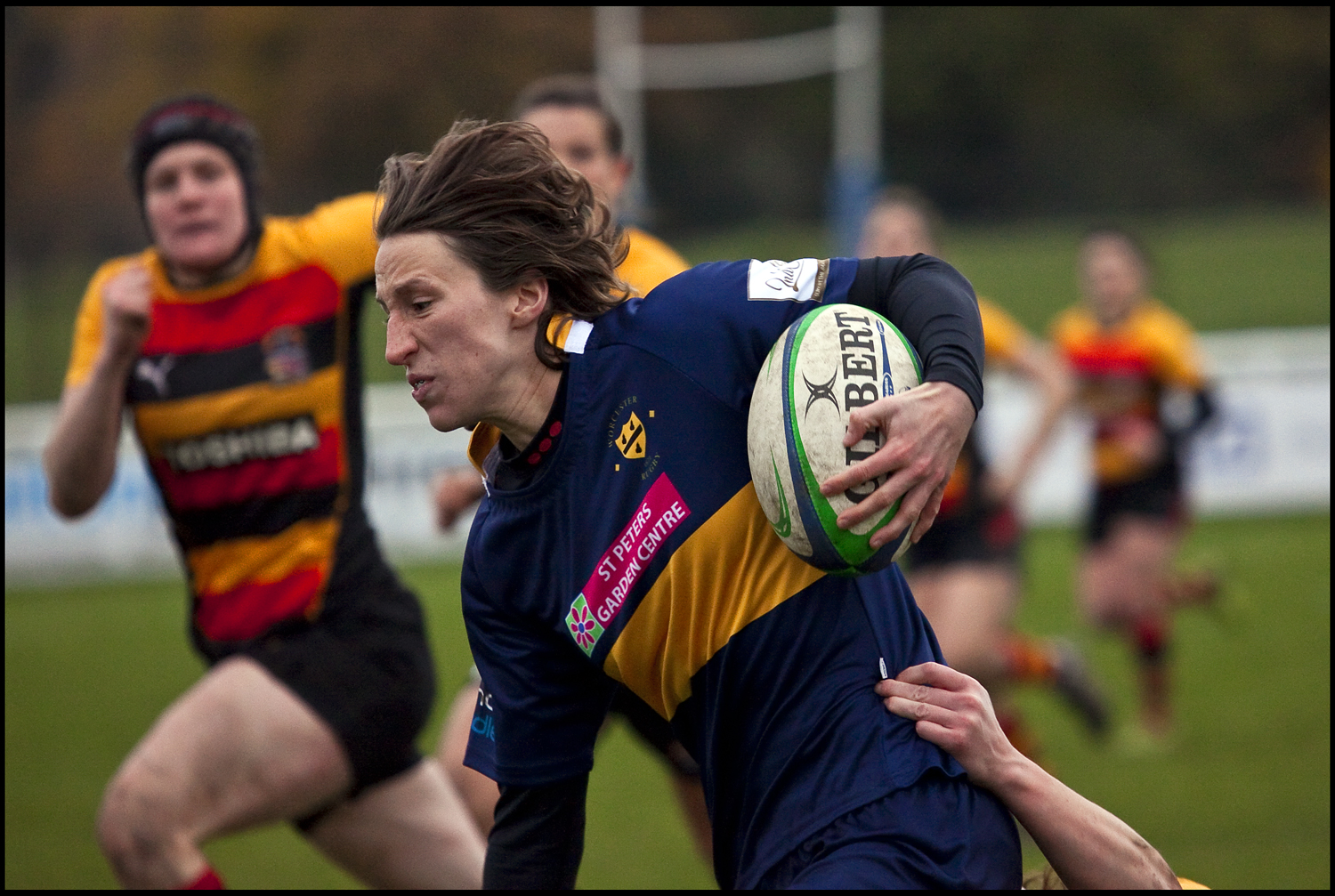
- playing for Worcester in 2010
- Born: 29 October 1985 (age 41) Brighton, East Sussex, England
- Height: 1.73 m (5 ft 8 in)
- Weight: 72 kg (159 lb; 11 st 5 lb)

Rugby union career
- Position: Wing
Senior career
Years	Team	Apps	(Points)
- Worcester
International career
Years	Team	Apps	(Points)
2005–2014	England	58	(225)
National sevens team
Years	Team		Comps
- England 7s
Medal record
Representing England
Women's rugby union
Rugby World Cup
Gold medal – first place	2014 France	Team competition
Silver medal – second place	2010 England	Team competition

Katherine Elizabeth "Kat" Merchant (born 29 October 1985) is an English rugby union player who represented England 58 times, scoring 44 tries.

== Life ==
Merchant was playing serious rugby when she was sixteen. She graduated from Birmingham University in Sport and Exercise Science in 2007.

She was playing for Worcester when she began her nine-year international career during the 2005 Six Nations. She played the 7 player and 15 player game and took part in two World Cups in both variations. She represented England at the 2010 Women's Rugby World Cup and was named in the squad for the 2014 Women's Rugby World Cup. She was a member of the squad to the 2013 Rugby World Cup Sevens

She announced her retirement in September 2014 with immediate effect on medical grounds, as she had taken a number of concussions.

In 2015 she was the coach for the Sri Lanka national team. As of September 2021 she was a personal trainer.
