= Katy Daley-McLean =

England international rugby union player

Katy McLean
- Born: 19 December 1985 (age 40) South Shields, Tyne & Wear, England
- Height: 1.67 m (5 ft 6 in)
- Weight: 70 kg (11 st 0 lb)

Rugby union career
- Position: Flyhalf
Senior career
| Years | Team | Apps | (Points) |
| 2013–2017 | Darlington Mowden Park Sharks | | |
| 2017–2020 | Loughborough Lightning | | |
| 2020–2021 | Sale Sharks Women | | |
International career
| Years | Team | Apps | (Points) |
| 2007–2020 | England | 116 | (542) |
National sevens teams
| Years | Team | | Comps |
| 2016 | Great Britain | | |
| 2017 | England | | |
Medal record
Representing England
Women's rugby union
Rugby World Cup
| Gold medal – first place | 2014 France | Team competition |
| Silver medal – second place | 2017 Ireland | Team competition |
| Silver medal – second place | 2010 England | Team competition |

Katy Daley-McLean MBE (born 19 December 1985) is an English retired rugby union player, who captained England Women. She also featured for Loughborough Lightning.

== Playing career ==
She played for England as captain and at fly-half for the Loughborough Lightning in the Premier 15s. As captain, Daley-McLean led England to victory against Canada in the final of the 2014 Women's Rugby World Cup held in France. She was thereafter bestowed with an MBE in the 2014 New Year Honours. As a part of Team Great Britain, Daley-McLean also placed fourth, at the 2016 Summer Olympics held in Rio de Janeiro, Brazil.

McLean was later named in the squad for the 2017 Women's Rugby World Cup in Ireland. In December 2020, she brought her international career to a close.

== Personal life ==
Katy graduated from the University of Sunderland with a BSc in Sports Studies in 2007. During 2015 she was made an honorary fellow of the University. She also works as a professional teacher.
