= Maggie Alphonsi =

England international rugby union player (born 1983)

Maggie Alphonsi MBE
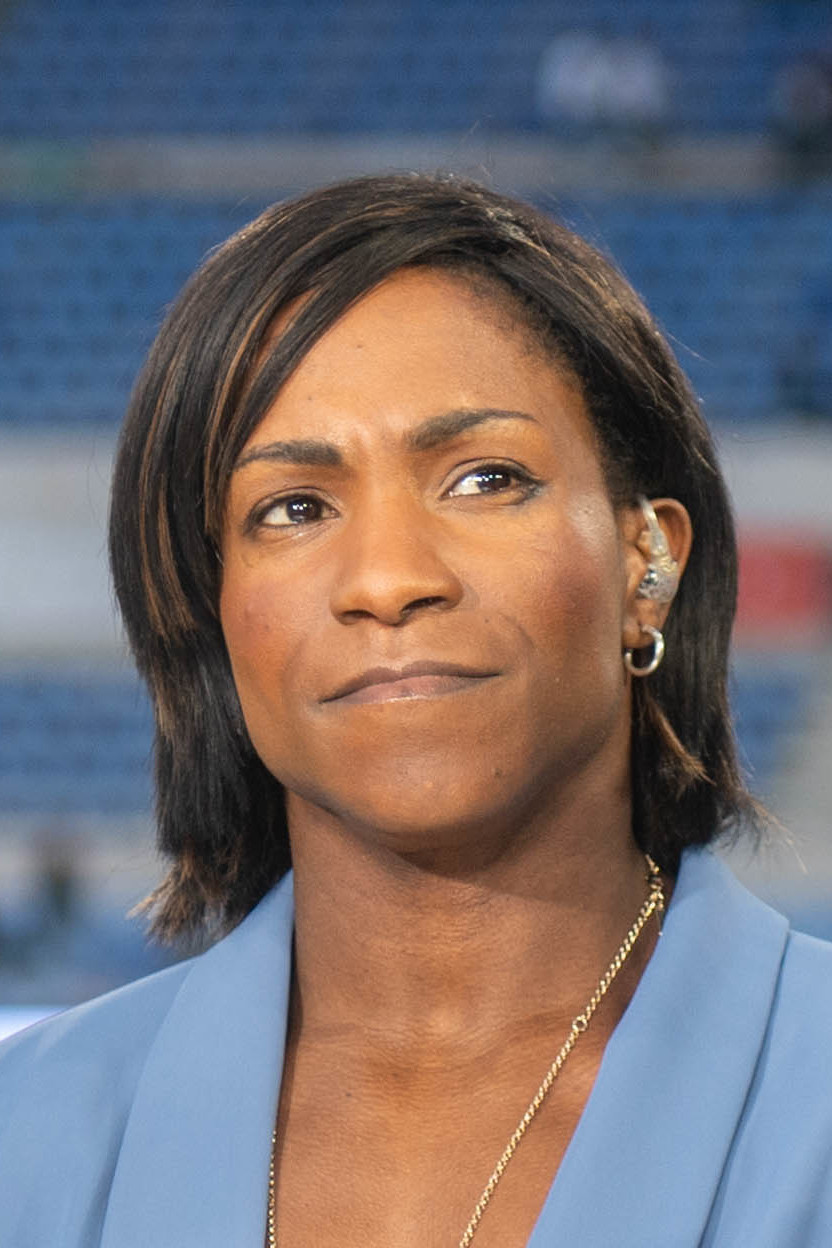
- Alphonsi in 2024
- Born: 20 December 1983 (age 42) Lewisham, south London, England
- Height: 1.63 m (5 ft 4 in)
- Weight: 73 kg (161 lb; 11 st 7 lb)

Rugby union career
- Position: Flanker
Senior career
Years	Team	Apps	(Points)
–	Saracens	–	(–)
International career
Years	Team	Apps	(Points)
2003–2014	England	74	(140)
Medal record
Representing England
Women's rugby union
Rugby World Cup
Gold medal – first place	2014 France	Team competition
Silver medal – second place	2010 England	Team competition
Silver medal – second place	2006 Canada	Team competition

Margaret Omotayo Sanni Alphonsi MBE (born 20 December 1983) is an English former rugby union player who played as a flanker for Saracens W.R.F.C. and England before retiring in 2014. She was The Sunday Times Sportswoman of the Year in 2010, and was inducted into the World Rugby Hall of Fame in November 2016 during the opening ceremonies for the Hall's first physical location in Rugby, Warwickshire.

Alphonsi was appointed a Member of the Order of the British Empire (MBE) in the 2012 Birthday Honours for services to rugby.

== Life ==
Alphonsi was born in Lewisham, south London, England to a single-parent family. She was born with a club foot, but she "trained so well on it" in order to play rugby.

Alphonsi was named in the 2014 World Cup Dream Team. She retired shortly after England won the 2014 World Cup in France and now coaches and promotes female participation and coaching in sport.

She was a Rugby World Cup 2015 Ambassador and is an ambassador of several not-for-profits and charities including Peace One Day, Wooden Spoon, Sporting Equals and SKRUM which aims to give the youth of Africa hope for the future through rugby.

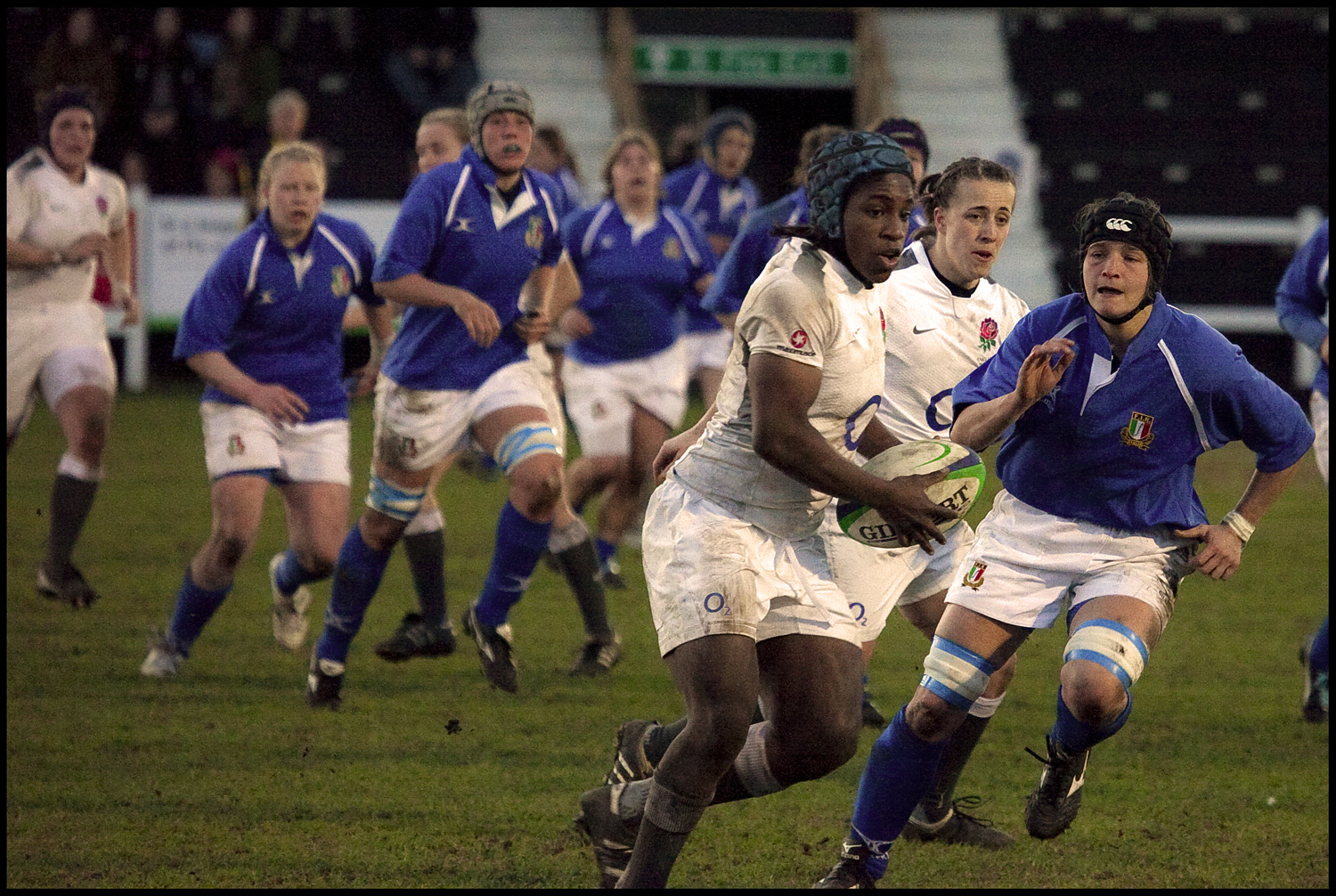
Alphonsi with the ball during the England v Italy match in the RBS Women's Six Nations

She has played in two Rugby World Cups and in 2012 shared in a record seventh successive Six Nations title and a sixth Grand Slam in seven years. She won the Pat Marshall award from the Rugby Union Writers’ Club, where she pipped New Zealand captain, Richie McCaw, to become the first woman to claim the prize in its 50-year history. She joined Gareth Malone and other celebrities in making the 2014 Children in Need official single.

Alphonsi attempted to qualify to compete in the 2016 Rio Olympics in the shot put.

In 2019, she was on the voting panel for the World Rugby Men's 15 Player of the Year award, the World Rugby Team of the Year award, and World Rugby Coach of the Year award.

Alphonsi holds an MSc in sports & exercise from Roehampton University, a BSc in sports & exercise from De Montfort University, and a BTEC National Diploma in leisure studies from Hertford Regional College. She was awarded an honorary Doctor of Arts by the University of Bedfordshire.

Alphonsi and her wife Marcella Collins have two children.
