= 2015 Women's Six Nations Championship =

International women's rugby union competition

- Date: 6 February – 22 March 2015
- Countries: England; France; Ireland; Italy; Scotland; Wales

Tournament statistics
- Champions: Ireland (2nd title)
- Triple Crown: Ireland (2nd title)
- Matches played: 15
- Tries scored: 77 (5.13 per match)
- Top point scorer: (Ireland) Niamh Briggs (49)
- Top try scorer: (France) Julie Billes (6)
- Official website: Official website

The 2015 Women's Six Nations Championship, also known as the 2015 RBS Women's Six Nations due to the tournament's sponsorship by the Royal Bank of Scotland, was the 14th series of the Women's Six Nations Championship, an annual women's rugby union competition between six European rugby union national teams. Matches were held in February and March 2015, on the same weekends as the men's tournament, if not always the same day.

The championship was contested by England, France, Ireland, Italy, Scotland and Wales. Ireland won the championship on a points difference tie-break from France, after both teams had won four of their five matches; it was Ireland's second title in three seasons. Ireland had to win their final game, against Scotland, by a margin of 27 points or more to win the title and achieved this with victory by 73 points to 3. This was also the first time Italy finished in a position above 4th place in the Six Nations, whether men's or women's, and the first time Italy had denied a team a Grand Slam. As in 2013, England focused on the Sevens World Series circuit in order to qualify a Great Britain team for the 2016 Rio Olympics, so there young and inexperienced squad were missing many front-line players.

== Table ==
Position	Nation	Games				Points			Tries	Table points
Position	Nation	Played	Won	Drawn	Lost	For	Against	Difference	Tries	Table points
1	Ireland	5	4	0	1	139	26	+113	20	8
2	France	5	4	0	1	113	44	+69	16	8
3	Italy	5	3	0	2	82	94	–12	13	6
4	England	5	2	0	3	104	65	+39	17	4
5	Wales	5	2	0	3	64	73	–9	9	4
6	Scotland	5	0	0	5	27	227	–200	2	0

== Fixtures and results ==
=== Week 1 ===
6 February 2015

Italy	5 – 30	Ireland
Try Maria Magatti 80'		Tries: Niamh Briggs 20'; Paula Fitzpatrick 42', 74'; Jenny Murphy 58'; Heather O'Brien 65'; Con: Niamh Briggs 20'; Pen: Niamh Briggs 56'

Stadio Mario Lodigiani, Firenze
Referee: Sara Cox (England)

ITALY:
FB	15	Manuela Furlan
RW	14	Maria Diletta Veronese	(substituted off) 51'
OC	13	Sofia Stefan	(substituted off) 65'
IC	12	Maria Grazia Cioffi	(substituted off) 51'
LW	11	Michela Sillari
FH	10	Veronica Schiavon
SH	9	Sara Barattin	(substituted off) 66'
N8	8	Silvia Gaudino (C)
OF	7	Elisa Giordano
BF	6	Ilaria Arrighetti	(substituted off) 50'
RL	5	Alice Trevisan
LL	4	Flavia Severin
TP	3	Melissa Bettoni	(substituted off) 70'
HK	2	Lucia Cammarano
LP	1	Elisa Cucchiella	(yellow card) 42' to 52'
Replacements:
HK	16	Awa Coulibaly	(substituted on) 50'
PR	17	Irene Campanini	(substituted on) 70'
FL	18	Michela Este
LK	19	Alessia Pantarotto
LK	20	Valentina Ruzza	(substituted on) 66'
FH	21	Beatrice Rigoni	(substituted on) 51'
CE	22	Paola Zangirolami	(substituted on) 51'
WG	23	Maria Magatti	(substituted on) 65'
Coach:
(Italy) Andrea Di Giandomenico

IRELAND:
FB	15	Niamh Briggs (C)
RW	14	Hannah Tyrrell
OC	13	Jenny Murphy
IC	12	Jackie Shiels	(substituted off) 69'
LW	11	Alison Miller	(substituted off) 75'
FH	10	Nora Stapleton
SH	9	Larissa Muldoon	(substituted off) 78'
N8	8	Heather O'Brien
OF	7	Claire Molloy
BF	6	Paula Fitzpatrick	(substituted off) 75'
RL	5	Sophie Spence
LL	4	Marie Louise Reilly	(substituted off) 69'
TP	3	Ailis Egan	(substituted off) 75'
HK	2	Gillian Bourke	(substituted off) 75'
LP	1	Ruth O'Reilly	(substituted off) 69'
Replacements:
HK	16	Sarah Mimnagh	(substituted on) 75'
PR	17	Fiona Hayes	(substituted on) 69'
PR	18	Fiona O'Brien	(substituted on) 75'
LK	19	Orla Fitzsimmons	(substituted on) 69'
FL	20	Katie Norris	(substituted on) 75' (yellow card) 79' to 80'
SH	21	Tania Rosser	(substituted on) 78'
CE	22	Katie Fitzhenry	(substituted on) 69'
WG	23	Sene Naoupu	(substituted on) 75'
Coach:
(Ireland) Tom Tierney

Assistant referees:
Maria Beatrice Benvenuti (Italy)
Clara Munarini (Italy)
Assessor:
n/a

7 February 2015

France	42 – 0	Scotland
Tries: Laëtitia Grand 4'; Jessy Trémoulière 11'; Julie Billes 25', 34', 53'; Céline Héguy 64'; Élodie Poublan 74'; Cons: Jessy Trémoulière 4', 25'; Pen: Jessy Trémoulière 20'

Stade Henri Desgrange, La Roche-sur-Yon, Vendée
Referee: Claire Hodnett (England)

FRANCE:
FB	15	Jessy Trémoulière	(substituted off) 61'
RW	14	Laura Délas	(substituted off) 40'
OC	13	Élodie Poublan
IC	12	Céline Héguy
LW	11	Julie Billes
FH	10	Camille Cabalou
SH	9	Yanna Rivoalen	(substituted off) 71'
N8	8	Safi N'Diaye
OF	7	Laëtitia Grand	(substituted off) 70'
BF	6	Coumba Diallo
RL	5	Marine De Nadaï	(substituted off) 54'
LL	4	Manon André
TP	3	Julie Duval	(substituted off) 54'
HK	2	Gaëlle Mignot (C)	(substituted off) 61'
LP	1	Lise Arricastre	(substituted off) 74'
Replacements:
HK	16	Wendy Divoux	(substituted on) 61'
PR	17	Élodie Portaries	(substituted on) 74'
LK	18	Céline Ferer	(substituted on) 54'
FL	19	Pauline Rayssac	(substituted on) 70'
SH	20	Marie Ménanteau	(substituted on) 71'
FB	21	Carla Neissen	(substituted on) 61'
WG	22	Caroline Boujard	(substituted on) 40'
PR	23	Christelle Chobet	(substituted on) 54'
Coach:
(France) Jean-Michel Gonzalez

SCOTLAND:
FB	15	Gillian Inglis
RW	14	Jenny Maxwell	(substituted off) 68'
OC	13	Chloe Rollie
IC	12	Nuala Deans	(substituted off) 68'
LW	11	Abi Evans
FH	10	Lisa Martin
SH	9	Sarah Law	(substituted off) 65'
N8	8	Jade Konkel
OF	7	Lyndsay O'Donnell	(substituted off) 50'
BF	6	Karen Dunbar
RL	5	Emma Wassell
LL	4	Deborah McCormack	(substituted off) 50'
TP	3	Tracy Balmer (C)	(substituted off) 72'
HK	2	Lana Skeldon	(substituted off) 29'
LP	1	Heather Lockhart	(substituted off) 60'
Replacements:
HK	16	Sarah Quick	(substituted on) 29'
PR	17	Lindsey Smith	(substituted on) 72'
PR	18	Lisa Robertson	(substituted on) 60'
LK	19	Christianne Fahey	(substituted on) 50'
FL	20	Rachael Cook	(substituted on) 50'
SH	21	Mhairi Grieve	(substituted on) 65'
CE	22	Claire Bain	(substituted on) 68'
WG	23	Eilidh Sinclair	(substituted on) 68'
Coach:
(Scotland) Jules Maxton

Assistant referees:
n/a
n/a
Assessor:
n/a

8 February 2015

Wales	13 – 0	England
Tries: Catrin Edwards 38'; Laurie Harries 50'; Pen: Laurie Harries 76'

St. Helen's Rugby and Cricket Ground, Swansea, West Glamorgan
Referee: Sherry Trumbull (Canada)

WALES:
FB	15	Dyddgu Hywel	(substituted off) 76'
RW	14	Elen Evans
OC	13	Adi Taviner
IC	12	Gemma Rowland
LW	11	Laurie Harries
FH	10	Elinor Snowsill
SH	9	Amy Day	(substituted off) 78'
N8	8	Shona Powell-Hughes
OF	7	Sioned Harries
BF	6	Sian Williams	(substituted off) 78'
RL	5	Rachel Taylor (C)
LL	4	Rebecca Rowe
TP	3	Catrin Edwards	(substituted off) 70'
HK	2	Carys Phillips	(substituted off) 75'
LP	1	Caryl Thomas	(substituted off) 55'
Replacements:
HK	16	Amy Lawrence	(substituted on) 75'
PR	17	Jenny Davies	(substituted on) 55'
PR	18	Amy Evans	(substituted on) 70'
LK	19	Jenny Hawkins
FL	20	Melissa Clay	(substituted on) 78'
SH	21	Keira Bevan	(substituted on) 78'
CE	22	Robyn Wilkins	(substituted on) 76'
WG	23	Kerin Lake
Coach:
(Wales) Rhys Edwards

ENGLAND:
FB	15	Kay Wilson
RW	14	Ruth Laybourn	(substituted off) 60'
OC	13	Abigail Brown
IC	12	Megan Goddard
LW	11	Sydney Gregson
FH	10	Ceri Large
SH	9	La Toya Mason	(substituted off) 60'
N8	8	Alex Matthews
OF	7	Hannah Gallagher	(substituted off) 50'
BF	6	Hannah Field
RL	5	Rowena Burnfield
LL	4	Tamara Taylor (C)
TP	3	Laura Keates	(substituted off) 60'
HK	2	Emma Croker	(substituted off) 52'
LP	1	Rochelle Clark	(substituted off) 60'
Replacements:
HK	16	Victoria Fleetwood	(substituted on) 52'
PR	17	Victoria Cornborough	(substituted on) 60'
PR	18	Justine Lucas	(substituted on) 60'
LK	19	Abbie Scott
FL	20	Harriet Millar-Mills	(substituted on) 50'
SH	21	Bianca Blackburn	(substituted on) 60'
FH	22	Lauren Cattell
WG	23	Katie Mason	(substituted on) 60'
Coach:
(England) Nicky Ponsford

Assistant referees:
Jamie Morgan (Wales)
Alun Emmanuel (Wales)
Assessor:
n/a

=== Week 2 ===
13 February 2015

Ireland	5 – 10	France
Try: Ailis Egan 47'		Try: Caroline Boujard 65'; Con: Jessy Trémoulière 65'; Pen: Jessy Trémoulière 75'

Milltown House, Ashbourne, County Meath
Referee: Amy Perrett (Australia)

IRELAND:
FB	15	Niamh Briggs (C)
RW	14	Aoife Doyle
OC	13	Jenny Murphy
IC	12	Katie Fitzhenry
LW	11	Alison Miller
FH	10	Nora Stapleton
SH	9	Larissa Muldoon	(substituted off) 54'
N8	8	Heather O'Brien
OF	7	Claire Molloy
BF	6	Paula Fitzpatrick	(yellow card) 73' to 80'
RL	5	Sophie Spence
LL	4	Marie Louise Reilly
TP	3	Ailis Egan
HK	2	Gillian Bourke
LP	1	Ruth O'Reilly	(substituted off) 66'
Replacements:
HK	16	Sarah Mimnagh
PR	17	Fiona Hayes	(substituted on) 66'
PR	18	Fiona O'Brien
LK	19	Orla Fitzsimmons
FL	20	Katie Norris
SH	21	Tania Rosser	(substituted on) 54'
CE	22	Jackie Shiels
WG	23	Sene Naoupu
Coach:
(Ireland) Tom Tierney

FRANCE:
FB	15	Jessy Trémoulière
RW	14	Caroline Boujard	(substituted off) 78'
OC	13	Élodie Poublan
IC	12	Céline Héguy
LW	11	Julie Billes
FH	10	Camille Cabalou
SH	9	Yanna Rivoalen
N8	8	Safi N'Diaye
OF	7	Laëtitia Grand	(substituted off) 35'
BF	6	Coumba Diallo
RL	5	Marine De Nadaï	(yellow card) 53' to 63' (substituted off) 68'
LL	4	Manon André
TP	3	Julie Duval	(substituted off) 41'
HK	2	Gaëlle Mignot (C)
LP	1	Lise Arricastre
Replacements:
HK	16	Wendy Divoux
PR	17	Élodie Portaries
LK	18	Céline Ferer	(substituted on) 68'
FL	19	Pauline Rayssac	(substituted on) 35'
SH	20	Cécilia Saubusse
FB	21	Carla Neissen
WG	22	Laura Délas	(substituted on) 78'
PR	23	Christelle Chobet	(substituted on) 41'
Coach:
(France) Jean-Michel Gonzalez

Assistant referees:
Helen O'Reilly (Ireland)
Dermot Blake (Ireland)
Assessor:
n/a

14 February 2015

Scotland	3 – 39	Wales
Pen: Nuala Deans 10'		Tries: Carys Phillips 45'; Sioned Harries 60'; Dyddgu Hywel 69'; Elinor Snowsill 73'; Amy Lawrence 77'; Cons: Laurie Harries 45', 60', 73', 77'; Pens: Laurie Harries 8', 15'

Broadwood Stadium, Cumbernauld, North Lanarkshire
Attendance: 461
Referee: Sherry Trumbull (Canada)

SCOTLAND:
FB	15	Chloe Rollie
RW	14	Hannah Sloan
OC	13	Hannah Smith	(substituted off) 55'
IC	12	Nuala Deans	(substituted off) 78'
LW	11	Abi Evans	(substituted off) 14' (substituted on) 18'
FH	10	Lisa Martin
SH	9	Mhairi Grieve	(substituted off) 55'
N8	8	Jade Konkel
OF	7	Lyndsay O'Donnell
BF	6	Karen Dunbar	(substituted off) 50'
RL	5	Emma Wassell	(substituted off) 63'
LL	4	Deborah McCormack	(yellow card) 70' to 80'
TP	3	Tracy Balmer (C)	(substituted off) 76'
HK	2	Lana Skeldon	(substituted off) 70'
LP	1	Heather Lockhart	(substituted off) 50'
Replacements:
HK	16	Sarah Quick	(substituted on) 70'
PR	17	Lindsey Smith	(substituted on) 76'
PR	18	Lisa Robertson	(substituted on) 50'
LK	19	Christianne Fahey	(substituted on) 63'
FL	20	Rachael Cook	(substituted on) 50'
SH	21	Sarah Law	(substituted on) 55'
CE	22	Claire Bain	(substituted on) 78'
WG	23	Eilidh Sinclair	(substituted on) 14' (substituted off) 18' (substituted on) 55'
Coach:
(Scotland) Jules Maxton

WALES:
FB	15	Dyddgu Hywel	(substituted off) 70'
RW	14	Elen Evans
OC	13	Adi Taviner
IC	12	Gemma Rowland	(substituted off) 55'
LW	11	Laurie Harries
FH	10	Elinor Snowsill	(substituted off) 71'
SH	9	Amy Day	(substituted off) 71'
N8	8	Rachel Taylor (C)
OF	7	Sioned Harries
BF	6	Sian Williams
RL	5	Jenny Hawkins
LL	4	Rebecca Rowe	(substituted off) 65'
TP	3	Catrin Edwards	(substituted off) 76'
HK	2	Carys Phillips	(substituted off) 71'
LP	1	Caryl Thomas	(substituted off) 40'
Replacements:
HK	16	Amy Lawrence	(substituted on) 71'
PR	17	Jenny Davies	(substituted on) 40'
PR	18	Amy Evans	(substituted on) 76'
LK	19	Melissa Clay	(substituted on) 65'
FH	20	Hannah Jones	(substituted on) 71'
SH	21	Keira Bevan	(substituted on) 71'
CE	22	Robyn Wilkins	(substituted on) 55'
WG	23	Kerin Lake	(substituted on) 70'
Coach:
(Wales) Rhys Edwards

Assistant referees:
Alex Pratt (Scotland)
Alexandra Gordon-Smith (Scotland)
Assessor:
n/a

15 February 2015

England	39 – 7	Italy
Tries: Alexandra Matthews 34'; Abbie Scott 39'; Ceri Large 60'; Katy McLean 72'; Hannah Gallagher 77'; Kay Wilson 79'; Cons: Katy McLean 34', 60'; Megan Goddard 77'; Pen: Katy McLean 4'		Try: Flavia Severin 27'; Con: Michela Sillari 27'

Twickenham Stoop, London
Attendance: 2,976
Referee: Alhambra Nievas (Spain)

ENGLAND:
FB	15	Kay Wilson
RW	14	Ruth Laybourn
OC	13	Abigail Brown
IC	12	Ceri Large
LW	11	Sydney Gregson	(substituted off) 52'
FH	10	Katy McLean	(substituted off) 74'
SH	9	Bianca Blackburn	(substituted off) 74'
N8	8	Harriet Millar-Mills	(substituted off) 66'
OF	7	Hannah Gallagher
BF	6	Alex Matthews
RL	5	Abbie Scott
LL	4	Tamara Taylor (C)
TP	3	Laura Keates	(substituted off) 53'
HK	2	Victoria Fleetwood	(substituted off) 54'
LP	1	Rochelle Clark	(substituted off) 52'
Replacements:
HK	16	Amy Cokayne	(substituted on) 54'
PR	17	Victoria Cornborough	(substituted on) 52'
PR	18	Justine Lucas	(substituted on) 53'
LK	19	Rowena Burnfield
FL	20	Hannah Field	(substituted on) 66'
SH	21	Fiona Davidson	(substituted on) 74'
FH	22	Megan Goddard	(substituted on) 74'
WG	23	Sarah McKenna	(substituted on) 52'
Coach:
(England) Nicky Ponsford

ITALY:
FB	15	Manuela Furlan
RW	14	Maria Magatti
OC	13	Sofia Stefan	(substituted off) 40'
IC	12	Paola Zangirolami
LW	11	Michela Sillari
FH	10	Beatrice Rigoni	(yellow card) 52' to 62'
SH	9	Sara Barattin
N8	8	Silvia Gaudino (C)
OF	7	Elisa Giordano
BF	6	Michela Este	(substituted off) 60'
RL	5	Alice Trevisan
LL	4	Flavia Severin
TP	3	Awa Coulibaly	(substituted off) 60'
HK	2	Melissa Bettoni
LP	1	Elisa Cucchiella	(substituted off) 46'
Replacements:
HK	16	Lucia Cammarano
PR	17	Irene Campanini	(substituted on) 60'
PR	18	Ilaria Arrighetti	(substituted on) 46'
LK	19	Alessia Pantarotto
FL	20	Valentina Ruzza	(substituted on) 60'
FH	21	Veronica Schiavon
CE	22	Maria Grazia Cioffi	(substituted on) 40'
WG	23	Maria Diletta Veronese
Coach:
(Italy) Andrea Di Giandomenico

Assistant referees:
Sara Cox (England)
Nikki O'Donnell (England)
Assessor:
n/a

=== Week 3 ===
27 February 2015

Ireland	11 – 8	England
Try: Larissa Muldoon 46'; Pens: Niamh Briggs 24', 74'		Try: Harriet Millar-Mills 38'; Pen: Katy McLean 16'

Milltown House, Ashbourne, County Meath
Referee: Leah Berard (United States)

IRELAND:
FB	15	Niamh Briggs (C)
RW	14	Hannah Tyrrell
OC	13	Jenny Murphy
IC	12	Katie Fitzhenry
LW	11	Alison Miller
FH	10	Nora Stapleton
SH	9	Larissa Muldoon	(substituted off) 71'
N8	8	Heather O'Brien
OF	7	Claire Molloy
BF	6	Paula Fitzpatrick
RL	5	Marie Louise Reilly
LL	4	Sophie Spence
TP	3	Ailis Egan	(substituted off) 80'
HK	2	Gillian Bourke
LP	1	Ruth O'Reilly	(substituted off) 48'
Replacements:
HK	16	Sarah Mimnagh
PR	17	Fiona Hayes	(substituted on) 48'
PR	18	Fiona O'Brien	(substituted on) 80'
LK	19	Orla Fitzsimmons
FL	20	Katie Norris
SH	21	Tania Rosser	(substituted on) 71'
CE	22	Jackie Shiels
WG	23	Sene Naoupu
Coach:
(Ireland) Tom Tierney

ENGLAND:
FB	15	Lauren Cattell
RW	14	Ruth Laybourn	(substituted off) 75'
OC	13	Abigail Brown	(substituted off) 80'
IC	12	Ceri Large
LW	11	Sydney Gregson
FH	10	Katy McLean (C)
SH	9	Bianca Blackburn	(substituted off) 80'
N8	8	Harriet Millar-Mills
OF	7	Hannah Gallagher
BF	6	Alexandra Matthews	(substituted off) 78'
RL	5	Abbie Scott
LL	4	Tamara Taylor
TP	3	Laura Keates
HK	2	Victoria Fleetwood
LP	1	Rochelle Clark
Replacements:
HK	16	Amy Cokayne
PR	17	Heather Kerr
PR	18	Justine Lucas
LK	19	Rowena Burnfield
FL	20	Hannah Field	(substituted on) 78'
SH	21	Fiona Davidson	(substituted on) 80'
FH	22	Megan Goddard	(substituted on) 80'
CE	23	Amber Reed	(substituted on) 75'
Coach:
(England) Simon Middleton

Assistant referees:
Joy Neville (Ireland)
John Carvill (Ireland)
Assessor:
n/a

27 February 2015

France	28 – 7	Wales
Tries: Gaëlle Mignot 6'; Penalty try 49'; Julie Billes 51', 70'; Con: Jessy Trémoulière 49'; Pens: Jessy Trémoulière 19', 40'		Try: Penalty try 80'; Con: Laurie Harries 80'

Stade Sapiac, Montauban, Tarn-et-Garonne
Referee: Alhambra Nievas (Spain)

FRANCE:
FB	15	Jessy Trémoulière	(substituted off) 63'
RW	14	Shannon Izar
OC	13	Élodie Poublan
IC	12	Céline Héguy	(substituted off) 40'
LW	11	Julie Billes
FH	10	Camille Cabalou	(substituted off) 55'
SH	9	Yanna Rivoalen
N8	8	Safi N'Diaye
OF	7	Laëtitia Grand
BF	6	Coumba Diallo	(substituted off) 55'
RL	5	Céline Ferer
LL	4	Marine De Nadaï	(substituted off) 3'
TP	3	Christelle Chobet	(substituted off) 40'
HK	2	Gaëlle Mignot (C)	(substituted off) 72'
LP	1	Lise Arricastre	(substituted off) 72'
Replacements:
HK	16	Wendy Divoux	(substituted on) 72'
PR	17	Julie Duval	(substituted on) 40'
LK	18	Audrey Forlani	(substituted on) 3'
FL	19	Pauline Rayssac	(substituted on) 55'
CE	20	Marjorie Mayans	(substituted on) 40'
FB	21	Carla Neissen	(substituted on) 63'
WG	22	Caroline Boujard	(substituted on) 55'
PR	23	Patricia Carricaburu	(substituted on) 72'
Coach:
(France) Jean-Michel Gonzalez

WALES:
FB	15	Dyddgu Hywel	(substituted off) 47' (substituted on) 55'
RW	14	Elen Evans	(substituted off) 65'
OC	13	Adi Taviner
IC	12	Robyn Wilkins	(substituted off) 57'
LW	11	Laurie Harries
FH	10	Elinor Snowsill
SH	9	Amy Day	(substituted off) 78'
N8	8	Shona Powell-Hughes	(substituted off) 63'
OF	7	Sioned Harries	(yellow card) 40' to 50'
BF	6	Sian Williams
RL	5	Rachel Taylor (C)
LL	4	Rebecca Rowe	(substituted off) 47'
TP	3	Catrin Edwards	(substituted off) 78'
HK	2	Carys Phillips	(substituted off) 63'
LP	1	Caryl Thomas	(yellow card) 45' to 55' (substituted off) 55'
Replacements:
HK	16	Amy Lawrence	(substituted on) 63'
PR	17	Jenny Davies	(substituted on) 47'
PR	18	Amy Evans	(substituted on) 78'
LK	19	Jenny Hawkins	(substituted on) 47'
FL	20	Melissa Clay	(substituted on) 63'
SH	21	Keira Bevan	(substituted on) 78'
CE	22	Gemma Rowland	(substituted on) 57'
WG	23	Kerin Lake	(substituted on) 65'
Coach:
(Wales) Rhys Edwards

Assistant referees:
Christine Hanizet (France)
Marie Lematte (France)
Assessor:
n/a

1 March 2015

Scotland	8 – 31	Italy
Try: Jade Konkel 74'; Pen: Nuala Deans 23'		Tries: Maria Magatti 6', 30'; Manuela Furlan 14'; Veronica Schiavon 61'; Maria Grazia Cioffi 76'; Cons: Veronica Schiavon 6', 14', 61'

Broadwood Stadium, Cumbernauld, North Lanarkshire
Referee: Helen O'Reilly (Ireland)

SCOTLAND:
FB	15	Chloe Rollie
RW	14	Hannah Sloan	(substituted off) 50'
OC	13	Hannah Smith
IC	12	Nuala Deans	(substituted off) 69'
LW	11	Abi Evans
FH	10	Lisa Martin
SH	9	Sarah Law	(substituted off) 61'
N8	8	Jade Konkel
OF	7	Karen Dunbar	(substituted off) 61'
BF	6	Rachael Cook
RL	5	Emma Wassell
LL	4	Christianne Fahey	(substituted off) 41'
TP	3	Tracy Balmer (C)	(substituted off) 76'
HK	2	Lana Skeldon	(substituted off) 66'
LP	1	Lisa Robertson	(substituted off) 66'
Replacements:
PR	16	Lindsey Smith	(substituted on) 66'
HK	17	Heather Lockhart	(substituted on) 66'
PR	18	Katie Dougan	(substituted on) 76'
LK	19	Deborah McCormack	(substituted on) 41'
FL	20	Lyndsay O'Donnell	(substituted on) 61'
SH	21	Mhairi Grieve	(substituted on) 61'
CE	22	Claire Bain	(substituted on) 69'
WG	23	Eilidh Sinclair	(substituted on) 50'
Coach:
(Scotland) Jules Maxton

ITALY:
FB	15	Manuela Furlan	(substituted off) 63'
RW	14	Maria Grazia Cioffi	(substituted off) 78'
OC	13	Michela Sillari
IC	12	Beatrice Rigoni	(substituted off) 68'
LW	11	Maria Magatti
FH	10	Veronica Schiavon
SH	9	Sara Barattin
N8	8	Silvia Gaudino (C)
OF	7	Elisa Giordano
BF	6	Michela Este	(yellow card) 53' to 63' (substituted off) 63'
RL	5	Alice Trevisan	(substituted off) 78'
LL	4	Flavia Severin	(yellow card) 44' to 54' (substituted off) 68'
TP	3	Lucia Gai
HK	2	Melissa Bettoni	(substituted off) 71'
LP	1	Elisa Cucchiella	(substituted off) 57'
Replacements:
HK	16	Lucia Cammarano	(substituted on) 71'
PR	17	Awa Coulibaly	(substituted on) 57'
PR	18	Ilaria Arrighetti	(substituted on) 63'
LK	19	Alessia Pantarotto	(substituted on) 78'
FL	20	Valentina Ruzza	(substituted on) 68'
CE	21	Paola Zangirolami	(substituted on) 68'
CE	22	Sofia Stefan	(substituted on) 63'
WG	23	Federica Cipolla	(substituted on) 78'
Coach:
(Italy) Andrea Di Giandomenico

Assistant referees:
Mhairi Hay (Scotland)
Kelly Mitchell (Scotland)
Assessor:
n/a

=== Week 4 ===
13 March 2015

England	42 – 13	Scotland
Tries: Ruth Laybourn 1', 56',77'; Tamara Taylor 7'; Justine Lucas 30'; Rochelle Clark 32'; Fiona Pocock 49'; Lydia Thompson 63'; Con: Amber Reed 63'		Try: Eilidh Sinclair 54'; Con: Lisa Martin 54'; Pens: Nuala Deans 5'; Lisa Martin 18'

The Darlington Arena, Darlington, County Durham
Referee: Helen O'Reilly (Ireland)

ENGLAND:
FB	15	Fiona Pocock
RW	14	Ruth Laybourn
OC	13	Abigail Brown	(substituted off) 40'
IC	12	Ceri Large
LW	11	Lydia Thompson
FH	10	Katy McLean (C)	(yellow card) 68' to 78'
SH	9	Bianca Blackburn	(substituted off) 15' (substituted on) 21'
N8	8	Harriet Millar-Mills
OF	7	Hannah Field
BF	6	Alexandra Matthews
RL	5	Rowena Burnfield
LL	4	Tamara Taylor
TP	3	Justine Lucas
HK	2	Victoria Fleetwood	(substituted off) 40'
LP	1	Rochelle Clark	(substituted off) 40'
Replacements:
HK	16	Amy Cokayne	(substituted on) 40'
PR	17	Victoria Cornborough	(substituted on) 40'
PR	18	Heather Kerr
LK	19	Abbie Scott
FL	20	Hannah Gallagher
SH	21	Fiona Davidson	(substituted on) 15' (substituted off) 21'
FH	22	Amber Reed	(substituted on) 40'
WG	23	Lauren Cattell
Coach:
(England) Simon Middleton

SCOTLAND:
FB	15	Chloe Rollie
RW	14	Eilidh Sinclair
OC	13	Hannah Smith
IC	12	Nuala Deans
LW	11	Abi Evans
FH	10	Lisa Martin
SH	9	Sarah Law
N8	8	Jade Konkel
OF	7	Karen Dunbar
BF	6	Rachael Cook	(substituted off) 72'
RL	5	Emma Wassell
LL	4	Deborah McCormack
TP	3	Tracy Balmer (C)	(substituted off) 62'
HK	2	Lana Skeldon
LP	1	Lisa Robertson	(substituted off) 66'
Replacements:
HK	16	Lindsey Smith	(substituted on) 66'
PR	17	Heather Lockhart	(substituted on) 62'
PR	18	Katie Dougan
LK	19	Fiona Sim	(substituted on) 72'
FL	20	Lyndsay O'Donnell
SH	21	Mhairi Grieve
CE	22	Claire Bain
WG	23	Jenny Maxwell
Coach:
(Scotland) Jules Maxton

Assistant referees:
Sarah Toll
Matthew Daubney
Assessor:
Trevor Fisher

14 March 2015

Italy	17 – 12	France
Tries: Maria Magatti 4', 80'; Sofia Stefan 36'; Con: Veronica Schiavon 4'		Tries: Julie Billes 9'; Caroline Boujard 38'; Con: Jessy Trémoulière 9'

Nuovi Impianti Sportivi Comunali, Badia Polesine, Rovigo
Referee: Jess Beard (New Zealand)

ITALY:
FB	15	Manuela Furlan
RW	14	Maria Magatti
OC	13	Michela Sillari
IC	12	Beatrice Rigoni
LW	11	Sofia Stefan
FH	10	Veronica Schiavon
SH	9	Sara Barattin
N8	8	Silvia Gaudino (C)
OF	7	Elisa Giordano
BF	6	Michela Este	(substituted off) 58'
RL	5	Alice Trevisan
LL	4	Flavia Severin
TP	3	Lucia Gai	(substituted off) 73'
HK	2	Melissa Bettoni
LP	1	Elisa Cucchiella	(substituted off) 60'
Replacements:
HK	16	Lucia Cammarano	(substituted on) 73'
PR	17	Awa Coulibaly	(substituted on) 60'
FL	18	Ilaria Arrighetti	(substituted on) 58'
LK	19	Alessia Pantarotto
LK	20	Valentina Ruzza
CE	21	Federica Cipolla
CE	22	Paola Zangirolami
WG	23	Maria Diletta Veronese
Coach:
(Italy) Andrea Di Giandomenico

FRANCE:
FB	15	Jessy Trémoulière	(substituted off) 58'
RW	14	Caroline Boujard
OC	13	Élodie Poublan
IC	12	Céline Héguy	(substituted off) 53'
LW	11	Julie Billes
FH	10	Camille Cabalou
SH	9	Yanna Rivoalen
N8	8	Safi N'Diaye
OF	7	Laëtitia Grand	(substituted off) 67'
BF	6	Pauline Rayssac	(substituted off) 36'
RL	5	Audrey Forlani
LL	4	Laëtitia Bobo	(substituted off) 51'
TP	3	Julie Duval
HK	2	Gaëlle Mignot (C)
LP	1	Lise Arricastre	(substituted off) 64'
Replacements:
HK	16	Wendy Divoux
PR	17	Amaya Gonzalez
LK	18	Emilie Mathieu	(substituted on) 51'
FL	19	Sophie Pin	(substituted on) 67'
FL	20	Coumba Diallo	(substituted on) 36'
FH	21	Audrey Abadie	(substituted on) 53'
CE	22	Lina Guérin	(substituted on) 58'
PR	23	Patricia Carricaburu	(substituted on) 64'
Coach:
(France) Jean-Michel Gonzalez

Assistant referees:
Barbara Guastini (Italy)
Francesca Giuliani (Italy)
Assessor:
n/a

15 March 2015

Wales	0 – 20	Ireland
		Tries: Paula Fitzpatrick 27'; Alison Miller 80'; Cons: Niamh Briggs 27' ,80'; Pens: Niamh Briggs 48', 61'

St. Helen's Rugby and Cricket Ground, Swansea, West Glamorgan
Referee: Claire Hodnett (England)

WALES:
FB	15	Dyddgu Hywel	(substituted off) 50'
RW	14	Elen Evans
OC	13	Adi Taviner
IC	12	Gemma Rowland
LW	11	Laurie Harries
FH	10	Elinor Snowsill	(substituted off) 78'
SH	9	Amy Day	(substituted off) 78'
N8	8	Shona Powell-Hughes
OF	7	Sioned Harries
BF	6	Sian Williams	(substituted off) 78'
RL	5	Rachel Taylor (C)
LL	4	Jenny Hawkins	(substituted off) 75'
TP	3	Catrin Edwards	(substituted off) 58'
HK	2	Carys Phillips	(substituted off) 75'
LP	1	Jenny Davies	(substituted off) 50'
Replacements:
HK	16	Amy Lawrence	(substituted on) 75'
PR	17	Caryl Thomas	(substituted on) 50'
PR	18	Amy Evans	(substituted on) 58'
LK	19	Rebecca Rowe	(substituted on) 75'
FL	20	Melissa Clay	(substituted on) 78'
SH	21	Keira Bevan	(substituted on) 78'
CE	22	Kerin Lake	(substituted on) 50'
FH	23	Hannah Jones	(substituted on) 78'
Coach:
(Wales) Rhys Edwards

IRELAND:
FB	15	Niamh Briggs (C)
RW	14	Hannah Tyrrell	(substituted off) 80'
OC	13	Jenny Murphy
IC	12	Jackie Shiels	(substituted off) 20' (substituted on) 26'
LW	11	Alison Miller
FH	10	Nora Stapleton	(substituted off) 68'
SH	9	Larissa Muldoon	(substituted off) 55'
N8	8	Heather O'Brien	(substituted off) 34'
OF	7	Claire Molloy
BF	6	Paula Fitzpatrick
RL	5	Marie Louise Reilly
LL	4	Sophie Spence	(substituted off) 80'
TP	3	Ailis Egan	(substituted off) 80'
HK	2	Gillian Bourke	(substituted off) 80'
LP	1	Ruth O'Reilly	(substituted off) 55'
Replacements:
HK	16	Sarah Mimnagh	(substituted on) 80'
PR	17	Fiona Hayes	(substituted on) 55'
PR	18	Fiona O'Brien	(substituted on) 80'
LK	19	Orla Fitzsimmons	(substituted on) 34'
FL	20	Katie Norris	(substituted on) 80'
SH	21	Tania Rosser	(substituted on) 55'
CE	22	Sene Naoupu	(substituted on) 20' (substituted off) 26' (substituted on) 68'
WG	23	Aoife Doyle	(substituted on) 80'
Coach:
(Ireland) Tom Tierney

Assistant referees:
Stuart Kibble (Wales)
Steff Edwards (Wales)
Assessor:
n/a

=== Week 5 ===
21 March 2015

Italy	22 – 5	Wales
Tries: Flavia Severin 6'; Sara Barattin 61'; Paola Zangirolami 80'; Cons: Veronica Schiavon 6', 61'; Pen: Veronica Schiavon 21'		Try: Sioned Harries 10'

Stadio Plebiscito, Padova
Referee: Leah Berard (United States)

ITALY:
FB	15	Manuela Furlan
RW	14	Maria Magatti
OC	13	Michela Sillari
IC	12	Beatrice Rigoni
LW	11	Sofia Stefan	(substituted off) 75'
FH	10	Veronica Schiavon	(substituted off) 68'
SH	9	Sara Barattin
N8	8	Silvia Gaudino (C)
OF	7	Elisa Giordano
BF	6	Michela Este	(substituted off) 49'
RL	5	Alice Trevisan
LL	4	Flavia Severin
TP	3	Lucia Gai
HK	2	Melissa Bettoni
LP	1	Elisa Cucchiella
Replacements:
HK	16	Irene Campanini
PR	17	Awa Coulibaly
FL	18	Ilaria Arrighetti	(substituted on) 49'
LK	19	Alessia Pantarotto
LK	20	Valentina Ruzza
CE	21	Maria Grazia Cioffi	(substituted on) 68'
CE	22	Paola Zangirolami	(substituted on) 75'
WG	23	Maria Diletta Veronese
Coach:
(Italy) Andrea Di Giandomenico

WALES:
FB	15	Laurie Harries
RW	14	Elen Evans
OC	13	Kerin Lake	(substituted off) 74'
IC	12	Gemma Rowland	(substituted off) 71'
LW	11	Adi Taviner
FH	10	Elinor Snowsill
SH	9	Keira Bevan	(substituted off) 62'
N8	8	Sioned Harries
OF	7	Rachel Taylor (C)
BF	6	Sian Williams	(substituted off) 74'
RL	5	Shona Powell-Hughes	(substituted off) 63'
LL	4	Rebecca Rowe	(substituted off) 54'
TP	3	Catrin Edwards
HK	2	Carys Phillips	(substituted off) 57'
LP	1	Caryl Thomas	(substituted off) 71'
Replacements:
HK	16	Amy Lawrence	(substituted on) 57'
PR	17	Jenny Davies	(substituted on) 71'
PR	18	Amy Evans	(substituted on) 63'
LK	19	Jenny Hawkins	(substituted on) 54'
FL	20	Melissa Clay	(substituted on) 74'
SH	21	Amy Day	(substituted on) 62'
CE	22	Ffion Bowen	(substituted on) 74'
WG	23	Hannah Jones	(substituted on) 71'
Coach:
(Wales) Rhys Edwards

Assistant referees:
Clara Munarini (Italy)
Maria Giovanna Pacifico (Italy)
Assessor:
n/a

21 March 2015

England	15 – 21	France
Tries: Hannah Gallagher 57'; Harriet Miller-Mills 72'; Con: Amber Reed 72'; Pen: Amber Reed 39'		Tries: Gaëlle Mignot 22'; Jessy Trémoulière 67'; Con: Jessy Trémoulière 22'; Pens: Jessy Trémoulière 4', 36', 52'

Twickenham Stadium, London
Referee: Alhambra Nievas (Spain)

ENGLAND:
FB	15	Fiona Pocock
RW	14	Ruth Laybourn
OC	13	Amber Reed
IC	12	Ceri Large	(substituted off) 39'
LW	11	Lydia Thompson
FH	10	Katy McLean (C)
SH	9	Bianca Blackburn	(substituted off) 53'
N8	8	Alexandra Matthews
OF	7	Hannah Field	(substituted off) 16'
BF	6	Hannah Gallagher
RL	5	Abbie Scott
LL	4	Tamara Taylor
TP	3	Justine Lucas	(substituted off) 51'
HK	2	Victoria Fleetwood	(substituted off) 68'
LP	1	Rochelle Clark	(substituted off) 71'
Replacements:
HK	16	Amy Cokayne	(substituted on) 68'
PR	17	Victoria Cornborough	(substituted on) 71'
PR	18	Laura Keates	(substituted on) 51'
LK	19	Rowena Burnfield
N8	20	Harriet Millar-Mills	(substituted on) 16'
SH	21	Fiona Davidson	(substituted on) 53'
CE	22	Abigail Brown	(substituted on) 39' (substituted off) 79'
WG	23	Katie Mason	(substituted on) 79'
Coach:
(England) Simon Middleton

FRANCE:
FB	15	Jessy Trémoulière
RW	14	Céline Héguy	(substituted off) 43'
OC	13	Shannon Izar	(yellow card) 28' to 38'
IC	12	Élodie Poublan
LW	11	Julie Billes
FH	10	Audrey Abadie	(substituted off) 61'
SH	9	Yanna Rivoalen	(substituted off) 59'
N8	8	Safi N'Diaye
OF	7	Laëtitia Grand
BF	6	Coumba Diallo	(substituted off) 71'
RL	5	Audrey Forlani	(substituted off) 54'
LL	4	Manon André
TP	3	Patricia Carricaburu	(substituted off) 43'
HK	2	Gaëlle Mignot (C)	(substituted off) 74'
LP	1	Lise Arricastre	(substituted off) 74'
Replacements:
HK	16	Wendy Divoux	(substituted on) 74'
PR	17	Julie Duval	(substituted on) 43'
LK	18	Sophie Pin	(substituted on) 71'
FL	19	Pauline Rayssac	(substituted on) 54'
SH	20	Jennifer Troncy	(substituted on) 59'
CE	21	Marjorie Mayans	(substituted on) 43'
WG	22	Caroline Boujard	(substituted on) 61'
PR	23	Amaya Gonzalez	(substituted on) 74'
Coach:
(France) Jean-Michel Gonzalez

Assistant referees:
Sara Cox (England)
Tracey Pettingale (England)
Assessor:
n/a

22 March 2015

Scotland	3 – 73	Ireland
Pen: Nuala Deans 14'		Tries: Niamh Briggs 4'; Claire Molloy 17'; Heather O'Brien 30'; Gillian Bourke 35'; Alison Miller 40'+2', 42', 80'+3'; Paula Fitzpatrick 50'; Sophie Spence 63'; Tania Rosser 79'; Jenny Murphy 80'+5'; Cons: Niamh Briggs 30', 35', 40'+2', 42', 63', 79'; Pens: Niamh Briggs 12', 40'

Broadwood Stadium, Cumbernauld, North Lanarkshire
Referee: Jess Beard (New Zealand)

SCOTLAND:
FB	15	Chloe Rollie	(substituted off) 74'
RW	14	Nuala Deans
OC	13	Gillian Inglis
IC	12	Hannah Smith	(substituted off) 44'
LW	11	Eilidh Sinclair
FH	10	Lisa Martin
SH	9	Sarah Law	(substituted off) 56'
N8	8	Jade Konkel
OF	7	Karen Dunbar
BF	6	Rachael Cook	(substituted off) 40'
RL	5	Emma Wassell
LL	4	Deborah McCormack
TP	3	Tracy Balmer (C)
HK	2	Lana Skeldon	(substituted off) 56'
LP	1	Lisa Robertson	(substituted off) 51'
Replacements:
HK	16	Sarah Quick
PR	17	Lindsey Smith	(substituted on) 56'
PR	18	Heather Lockhart	(substituted on) 51'
LK	19	Fiona Sim
FL	20	Lyndsay O'Donnell	(substituted on) 40'
SH	21	Mhairi Grieve	(substituted on) 56'
CE	22	Claire Bain	(substituted on) 74'
WG	23	Jenny Maxwell	(substituted on) 44'
Coach:
(Scotland) Jules Maxton

IRELAND:
FB	15	Niamh Briggs (C)
RW	14	Hannah Tyrrell	(substituted off) 23'
OC	13	Jenny Murphy
IC	12	Jackie Shiels	(substituted off) 57'
LW	11	Alison Miller
FH	10	Nora Stapleton
SH	9	Larissa Muldoon	(substituted off) 57'
N8	8	Heather O'Brien
OF	7	Claire Molloy
BF	6	Paula Fitzpatrick	(substituted off) 75'
RL	5	Marie Louise Reilly
LL	4	Sophie Spence	(substituted off) 67'
TP	3	Ailis Egan	(substituted off) 78'
HK	2	Gillian Bourke	(substituted off) 78'
LP	1	Ruth O'Reilly	(substituted off) 52'
Replacements:
HK	16	Sarah Mimnagh	(substituted on) 78'
PR	17	Fiona Hayes	(substituted on) 52'
PR	18	Fiona O'Brien	(substituted on) 78'
LK	19	Orla Fitzsimmons	(substituted on) 67'
FL	20	Katie Norris	(substituted on) 75'
SH	21	Tania Rosser	(substituted on) 57'
CE	22	Sene Naoupu	(substituted on) 57'
WG	23	Aoife Doyle	(substituted on) 23'
Coach:
(Ireland) Tom Tierney

Assistant referees:
Alex Pratt (Scotland)
Mhairi Hay (Scotland)
Assessor:
n/a
