= Claire Molloy =

Ireland international rugby union player

- Born: 22 June 1988 (age 38) County Galway, Ireland
- Height: 1.65 m (5 ft 5 in)
- Weight: 68 kg (150 lb; 10 st 10 lb)
- School: Coláiste Iognáid
- University: Cardiff University
- Occupation: Doctor

Rugby union career
- Position: Loose forward
- Current team: Bristol Bears
Senior career
Years	Team	Apps	(Points)
2008–2009	Cardiff Quins		
2009–	Galwegians		
2010–2018	Bristol Ladies		
2018-2022	Wasps		
2022-	Bristol Bears		
Provincial / State sides
Years	Team	Apps	(Points)
2008–	Connacht		
2013–	Irish Exiles		
International career
Years	Team	Apps	(Points)
2009–	Ireland	70	(50)
National sevens team
Years	Team		Comps
- Ireland 7s

Claire Molloy (born 22 June 1988) is an Ireland women's rugby union international from Galway. Molloy represented Ireland at the 2010, 2014 and 2017 Women's Rugby World Cups. At the 2014 tournament she was a member of the Ireland team that defeated New Zealand and she captained Ireland at the 2017 tournament. She was also a member of the Ireland teams that won the 2013 and 2015 Women's Six Nations Championships. She is also an Ireland women's rugby sevens international and captained the Ireland team at the 2013 Rugby World Cup Sevens. Molloy also played ladies' Gaelic football for Galway and featured in the 2005 All-Ireland Senior Ladies' Football Championship final.

== Family ==
Molloy was raised in a sporting family. Claire's father, Evan Molloy, is a prominent member of the Colaiste Iognáid (Jez) Rowing Club. Three of her siblings have also represented Ireland at international level in different sports. Her younger brother, Tim Molloy, is a former Republic of Ireland under-19 association football international and also played for University College Dublin A.F.C. Her sister, Emily Molloy, played as a goalkeeper for the Ireland women's national field hockey team at underage level and her older brother, Liam Molloy, rowed for Ireland up to under-23 level.

== Gaelic football ==
Molloy played Ladies' Gaelic football for Galway and in 2005, aged 16, played in three finals for her county. On 30 April 2005 she played in the Ladies' National Football League final which Cork won 2–13 to 0–6. On 25 July 2005 she played in the All-Ireland Under-18 Ladies' Football Championship (minor) final against Donegal which Galway won 5–7 to 1–8. On 2 October 2005 she played in the 2005 All-Ireland Senior Ladies' Football Championship final which Cork won 1–11 to 0–8 Other members of these Galway teams included Niamh Fahey and Annette Clarke. Molloy played for Galway up to 2011.

== Rugby union ==
=== Clubs ===
Molloy switched codes from Ladies' Gaelic football to women's rugby union while attending Cardiff University where she studied medicine. She initially played for Cardiff Quins, making her debut in the WWRU National Cup final which Quins won. She was also a Cardiff Quins player when she made her debut for the Ireland women's national rugby union team. Molloy subsequently joined Bristol Ladies and on summer trips home from university she also played for Galwegians. Together with Sarah Hunter and Carys Phillips, Molloy was one of three Bristol Ladies players to captain their countries at the 2017 Women's Rugby World Cup. Hunter and Phillips captained England and Wales respectively. Molloy moved to Wasps in 2018, before returning to Bristol in 2022

=== Provincial level ===
Molloy has represented Connacht in the IRFU Women's Interprovincial Series. She has also played for the Irish Exiles.

=== Ireland international ===
On 6 February 2009, Molloy made her debut for the Ireland women's national rugby union team when she came on as replacement in a 7–5 win against France. This was the first time the Ireland Women had beaten France. Molloy went onto represent Ireland at the 2010, 2014 and 2017 Women's Rugby World Cups. At the 2014 tournament she was a member of the Ireland team that defeated New Zealand. She captained the Ireland team at the 2017 tournament, replacing an injured Niamh Briggs. Molloy was also a member of the Ireland teams that won the 2013 and 2015 Women's Six Nations Championships.

Molloy is also an Ireland women's rugby sevens international and captained the Ireland Sevens team at the 2013 Rugby World Cup Sevens. She also represented the Ireland Sevens at the 2013 European Women's Sevens Grand Prix Series and the 2015 Rugby Europe Women's Sevens Championships.

Molloy took a break from international rugby at the start of the 2020 season to concentrate on her medical career. She returned in September 2020 in time for the rescheduled 2020 Women's Six Nations Championship game against Italy.

In the 2021 Women's Six Nations Championship she started against Wales and France but did not make the match-day 23 for the play-off game against Italy.

On 28 September 2021, Molloy announced her retirement from international rugby.

== Personal life ==
=== Education ===
Molloy is qualified as a doctor. She studied medicine at Cardiff University, where her classmates included Jamie Roberts. She has worked as an A&E doctor in Abergavenny and at the University Hospital of Wales in Cardiff.

== Honours ==
=== Rugby union ===
Ireland

- Women's Six Nations Championship
  - Winners: 2013, 2015
- Grand Slam
  - Winners: 2013
- Triple Crown
  - Winners: 2013, 2015

Ireland Sevens

- Rugby Europe Women's Sevens Championships Plate
  - Winners: 2013

Cardiff Quins

- WWRU National Cup
  - Winners: 2008 ?

Individual

- 2012 Ireland Women's Player of the Year
- 2017 Guinness Rugby Writers of Ireland Women's Player of the Year
  - 2017

=== Gaelic football ===
Galway

- All-Ireland Under-18 Ladies' Football Championship
  - Winners: 2005
- All-Ireland Senior Ladies' Football Championship
  - Runners Up: 2005
- Ladies' National Football League
  - Runners Up: 2005
