= Gemma Rowland =

- Born: 7 February 1989 (age 37) Bristol, England
- Height: 1.68 m (5.5 ft)
- University: Cardiff Metropolitan University; University of Exeter
- Occupation(s): Army Captain, rugby player

Rugby union career
- Position: Centre
- Current team: Bristol Bears
Senior career
Years	Team	Apps	(Points)
2021-present	Bristol Bears		
2013-2021	Wasps		
2012-present	British Army		
International career
Years	Team	Apps	(Points)
2011–present	Wales		
- Correct as of 6 May 2021

Gemma Rowland (born 7 February 1989) is a Welsh Rugby Union player who plays centre for the Wales women's national rugby union team, Bristol Bears and the British Army Rugby Union. She made her debut for the Wales national squad in 2015, and represented them at the 2021 Women's Six Nations Championship.

== Club career ==
Rowland's interest in rugby began when she attended Colston's School in Bristol. At the time, the school's sports curriculum for female students included only hockey, netball, tennis and rounders. This changed when Laura Keates, now an ex-England international rugby player, joined the school, and she and Rowland began a campaign to start an after-school girls' rugby club. The team then went on to win the Rosslyn Park National Schools sevens two years in a row.

Rowland continued to play rugby while studying at the University of Exeter. It was here that she was offered a sports scholarship under the Talented Athlete Scholarship Scheme (TASS).

On joining the Army in 2011, Rowland was selected into the British Army rugby squad, and subsequently the United Kingdom Armed Forces team.

Rowland was deployed to Afghanistan in 2012, and on her return in 2013 signed with premiership club Wasps. She was selected into the Wales squad in 2015.

In a later interview, Rowland said she "never expected to leave Wasps", but following ankle surgery, the travel between her home in Wales and the club ground in Coventry became too challenging. In 2021, she moved to her current team, Bristol Bears.

== International career ==
Rowland made her international debut at the 2015 Women's Six Nations Championship, when Wales defeated world champions England in a memorable 13-0 victory at Swansea.

She then represented Wales at both the 2017 Women's Rugby World Cup, and at the 2018 Commonwealth Games, as well as subsequent Women's Six Nations Championships.

Rowland has won 19 caps in her rugby career to date.

== Personal life ==
Rowland attended Colston's School in Bristol as a child, before moving to the University of Exeter to study for a degree in sport and exercise science. She later obtained a master's degree in strength and conditioning from Cardiff Metropolitan University.

She has served with the British Army since 2011. Just six months after joining she was deployed to Afghanistan as a surveillance and reconnaissance specialist. In 2021 she served as head of training and development for the Army's unmanned air surveillance asset Watchkeeper Force.

Rowland has spoken publicly about the difficulties she experienced as a teenager, when at the age of 14 she developed bulimia. She attributes her recovery to rugby, commenting in an interview with The Times: "Playing rugby completely changed the way I felt about my body. No matter what shape or size you are, there is a position for you in the game. Everybody has a purpose. It just clicked for me."
