= Causley =

Causley is a surname. Notable people with the surname include:

- Charles Causley (1917–2003), British poet, school teacher and writer
- Ian Causley (1940–2020), Australian politician
- Jim Causley (born 1980), English folk singer, songwriter, and musician
