= Shona Powell-Hughes =

Wales international rugby union player

- Born: 8 July 1991 (age 35) Bridgend, South Wales
- Height: 1.75 m (5 ft 9 in)
- Weight: 85.45 kg (13 st 6.4 lb)

Rugby union career
- Position: Prop
- Current team: Gloucester-Hartpury
Senior career
Years	Team	Apps	(Points)
2019-present	Gloucester-Hartpury		
–	Ospreys		
–	Skewen RFC		
International career
Years	Team	Apps	(Points)
2010–present	Wales		
- Correct as of 24 April 2021

Shona Powell-Hughes (born 8 July 1991) is a Welsh Rugby Union professional player who plays prop for the Wales women's national rugby union team and Gloucester-Hartpury. She made her debut for the Wales national squad in 2010 as the youngest member of the team at the time, and represented them at the 2021 Women's Six Nations Championship.

== Club career ==
Powell-Hughes played for both Skewen RFC and Ospreys before joining Gloucester-Hartpury in 2019.

== International career ==
Powell-Hughes was called up to the Wales women's national rugby union team for the 2010 Women's Rugby World Cup, the youngest member of the team at the time. She then made her debut in a match against South Africa, where she was brought on as a substitute. She made a further appearance as a substitute in the following match, against New Zealand.

She made her Six Nations Championship entrance in 2011, where her efforts earned her the title of Young Player of the Year. Prior to the 2015 Women's Six Nations Championship, she was one of the players picked out by captain Rachel Taylor as 'one to watch' in an interview for Rugby World magazine. The team subsequently scored a 13–0 victory over England, marking only the second time the Welsh women had beaten the English team.

Powell-Hughes gained further attention during the 2016/17 championship when she scored tries from the back of the scrum in consecutive games against Ireland and France.

After appearing in the Rugby Sevens at the 2018 Commonwealth Games, Powell-Hughes was then picked for the rearranged 2020 Six Nations fixture against Scotland – her first appearance since 2017. She then represented Wales in the 2021 Women's Six Nations Championship.

She has earned 46 caps to date.

== Personal life ==
Powell-Hughes is active in promoting rugby for girls and young women. In 2015, she publicly endorsed the Swansea City AFC Community Trust's 'Girls 4 Sport' scheme, which sought to increase the level of sports coaching available to girls aged 9–11.

In 2018, she was appointed as a Wales Rugby Union 'Game Changer', a scheme designed to increase and improve rugby opportunities for women and girls. In this role, she worked with all areas of the Wales Rugby Union, along with clubs, schools and hub officers, to increase the number of women and girls regularly involved in Welsh rugby, and to improve the rugby products on offer to the Welsh female population.

== Honours ==
- Women's Six Nations Championship 'Young Player of the Year', 2011.
