= Abbie Brown =

English rugby sevens player

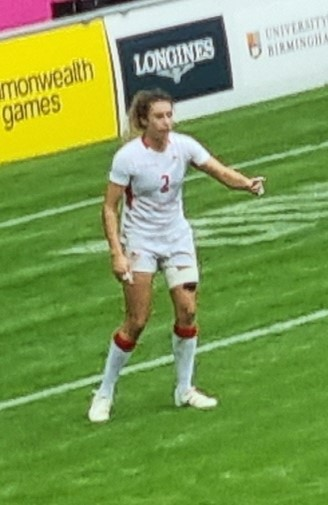
- Abbie Brown at the 2022 Commonwealth Games
- Full name: Abigail Brown
- Born: 10 April 1996 (age 30) Exeter, England
- Height: 1.76 m (5 ft 9 in)
- Weight: 71 kg (157 lb)

Rugby union career
- Position: Centre
Senior career
Years	Team	Apps	(Points)
2020–	Loughborough Lightning	-	(0)
2026	Mumbai Dreamers		
International career
Years	Team	Apps	(Points)
2015	England	5	(0)
National sevens teams
Years	Team		Comps
2015–	England		
2016–	Great Britain		
Medal record
Women's rugby sevens
Representing England
Commonwealth Games
Bronze medal – third place	2018 Gold Coast	Team competition
Representing Great Britain
European Games
Gold medal – first place	2023 Kraków–Małopolska	Team competition

Abigail Brown (born 10 April 1996) is an English rugby union and sevens player. She competed for Great Britain at the 2016 and 2020 Summer Olympics.

== Early life and career ==
Brown was born in Exeter and started playing rugby at the age of six for her local club Cullompton RFC. She attended Clyst Vale Community College in Broadclyst, Devon.

== Rugby career ==
Brown made her England fifteens test debut against Wales during the 2015 Six Nations. She later made her international sevens debut for the England sevens team in the Rugby Europe Grand Prix Series.

She made her World Sevens Series debut during the 2015–16 season and scored seven tries over the series. She had secured a full-time contract at that time.

She was named in Great Britain's sevens team to the 2016 Summer Olympics. She scored twice in their quarter-final match against Fiji to help her side reach the semi-finals.

She captained England for the 2017–18 World Sevens Series and led them again the following season.

Brown won a bronze medal with England at the 2018 Commonwealth Games in Gold Coast, Australia. In July 2018, she led England at the Sevens World Cup that was held in San Francisco. Although England were knocked out in the last 16 by Ireland, they did go on to secure the Challenge Trophy.

In 2020, She signed with Loughborough Lightning in the Premier 15s. In 2021, she co-captained Great Britain, together with England team-mate Megan Jones, at the delayed 2020 Summer Olympics in Tokyo.

Brown returned as England's captain for the remainder of the 2021–22 World Rugby Women's Sevens Series. She was named again as England's co-captain with Megan Jones for the 2022 Commonwealth Games in Birmingham. They also co-captained England again in September at the Rugby World Cup Sevens in Cape Town, South Africa.

She extended her contract with Loughborough Lightning in September 2023. She missed the 2024 Summer Olympics in Paris due to a hamstring injury.
