= Fiona O'Brien =

- Born: 15 January 1988 (age 38) Abbeyside, Ireland
- Height: 1.72 m (5 ft 7 1/2 in)

Rugby union career
- Position: Prop
Amateur team(s)
Years	Team	Apps	(Points)
- Old Belvedere
Senior career
Years	Team	Apps	(Points)
- Leinster
International career
Years	Team	Apps	(Points)
2015	Ireland	4	

Fiona O'Brien is an Irish women's rugby player who received her first cap in the opening match of the 2015 Women's Six Nations against Italy on 6 February. Ireland won, 30–5.

O'Brien plays for Old Belvedere and Leinster's women's teams.
