= Jenny Hawkins =

Welsh rugby union player

- Born: April 3, 1990 (age 36) Carmarthen, Wales
- Height: 170 cm (5 ft 7 in)
- Weight: 69 kg (152 lb)

Rugby union career
- Position: Second Row
International career
| Years | Team | Apps | (Points) |
| 2014– | Wales | 16 | (0) |

Jenny Hawkins (born 3 April 1990) is a Welsh rugby union player. She plays second row and has been capped 16 times for Wales.

== Rugby career ==
Hawkins made her international debut for Wales against Italy in 2014. She was also a part of the Welsh team for the 2014 Women's Rugby World Cup in France.

In 2015, she was selected again for Wales for the Six Nations Championship.

== Personal life ==
Hawkins is a PhD student at Cardiff University and the National Botanic Garden of Wales.
