= Clyst Vale Community College =

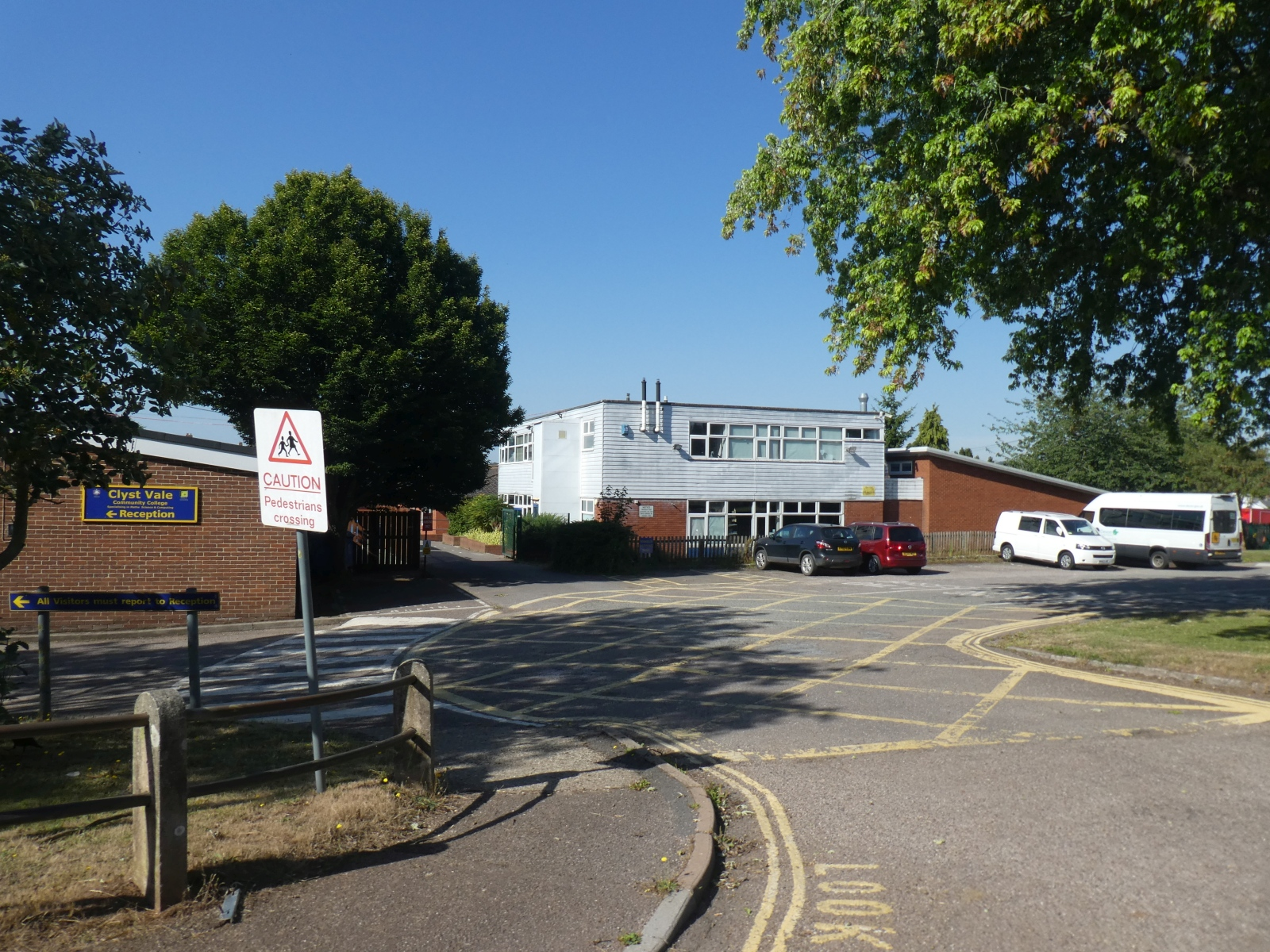
- Vehicular entrance to the school

Location
- Station Road; Exeter, Devon, EX5 3AJ; England; 50°45′31″N 3°26′23″W

Information
- Type: Academy
- Department for Education URN: 136638 Tables
- Ofsted: Reports
- Headteacher: Sara Jacobs
- Gender: Coeducational
- Age: 11 to 18
- Enrolment: 1,006
- Houses: Red, Yellow, Green
- Website: http://www.clystvale.org/

Clyst Vale Community College is a secondary school in Dog Village (Broadclyst), East Devon near Exeter in England. Since April 2011 it has been an academy.

The school is a Microsoft partnership school and therefore specialises in ICT as well as Mathematics and Science. The buildings cater for secondary education from ages 11 to 16, also previously containing a sixth form college until its closure due to a lack of funds in 2026. It also acts as an extracurricular college for those of the school and of the community offering after-school hours classes such as Carpentry, Music and Art.

== Notable former pupils ==
- Jim Causley - Musician (born 1980)
- Luke Newberry - Actor (born 1990)
- Abbie Brown (rugby union) (born 1996)
