= Forgotten Kingdom =

Studio album by Jim Causley
- Released: 19 February 2016
- Recorded: Devon, England
- Genre: Folk singer songwriter
- Length: 68:07
- Label: Hands on Music
- Producer: Mark Tucker

Jim Causley chronology
Cyprus Well (2013)	Forgotten Kingdom (2016)	The Clay Hymnal (2016)

Professional ratings
Review scores
Source	Rating
Mojo Magazine	4/5 stars
The Guardian	4/5 stars
BBC Music Magazine	5/5 stars
Folk Radio UK	4/5 stars
Bright Young Folk	4/5 stars
The Living Tradition	5/5 stars
R2 (Rock'n'Reel)	4/5 stars

Forgotten Kingdom is folk singer-songwriter Jim Causley's fifth studio album excluding his work with The Devil's Interval and Mawkin:Causley.

Forgotten Kingdom is Causley's first album of entirely self-written material although does include references to traditional song throughout. It was intended to celebrate ten years since the release of Causley's debut album Fruits of the Earth in 2005 but the release was delayed due to poor health on the part of original producer Phil Beer. Production of the album was then completed by Show of Hands regular producer Mark Tucker at The Green Room studios in East Devon.

Forgotten Kingdom is Causley's most ambitious solo recording project to date and has the largest line-up of guest musicians of any of his albums. This guests include many well known names from the British folk scene who happen to be based in Devon such as Seth Lakeman and Show of Hands as well as some local stalwarts of the more traditional folk music scene in the county. The theme of the album centres on the history of Devon and its neighbouring counties but also looks at Causley's own personal connection to the county and his experience of growing-up within it. The "forgotten kingdom" alluded to in the title is the Celtic Brythonic kingdom of Dumnonia which Causley previously referenced in his 2011 album; Dumnonia which was a collection of traditional songs from Devon. Not all of the songs on Forgotten Kingdom have a traditional folk feel to them and several hint at Causley's songwriting having more modern and expansive influences.

The album received highly positive reviews from The Guardian, BBC Music Magazine and fRoots among others, as well as airplay on radio shows such the Mark Radcliffe Folk Show on BBC Radio 2 and the Tom Robinson show on BBC Radio 6 Music. Writing in fRoots, Colin Irwin confirmed his previously stated opinion that Causley is "the finest singer of his generation".

== Track listing ==
All songs by Jim Causley.

1. "Gabbro Bowl / The Peninsula Prayer" – 4:53
2. "Back in the Day" – 4:20
3. "Banks of the Tale" – 4.04
4. "The Road to Combebow" – 3:24
5. "Rewind" – 4:23
6. "Home" – 4:07
7. "This Weekend" – 4:31
8. "Pride of the Moor" – 3:48
9. "Summer's End" – 5:28
10. "The Man You Know" – 2:53
11. "Reigning Men" – 5:18
12. "Goodnight Ballad" – 6:33
13. "Illogan Highway" – 7:01
14. "The Pastoria" – 5:49
15. "Sea Sick" – 2:48

== Personnel ==
- Jim Causley – accordion, piano, vocals
- James Dumbelton – acoustic guitar, vocals
- Becki Driscoll – fiddle, viola, vocals
- Nick Wyke – fiddle, octave-violin, vocals
- Phil Beer – fiddle, guitar, laud, vocals
- Steve Knightley – mandola, vocals
- Phillip Henry – dobro, chaturangi
- Hannah Martin – fiddle
- Miranda Sykes – double bass
- Rex Preston – mandolin
- Kathryn Roberts – piano, organ, vocals
- Seth Lakeman – bouzouki
- Katy Marchant – shawm, flageolet, English bagpipes
- Steve Tyler – hurdy-gurdy
- Matt Norman – mandolin, fiddle, banjo, bass banjo
- Mark Bazeley – melodeon
- Reese Wesson – cajun melodeon
- Lukas Drinkwater, guitar, double bass, vocals
- Jackie Oates – fiddle
- Chris Hoban – vocals

Ninebarrow

- Jon Whitley – vocals
- Jay LaBouchardiere – vocals

The Claque

- David Lowry – vocals
- Bill Crawford – vocals
- Tom Addison – vocals
- Barry Lister – vocals

== Production ==
- Executive Producer – Jim Causley
- Producer – Mark Tucker
- Recording Engineers – Mark Tucker, Phil Beer and Sean Lakeman
- Audio Mixing – Mark Tucker
- Audio Mastering – Mark Tucker
- Recording locations – Lions Rest Industrial Estate, Exminster, Devon; The Green Room Studios, Upottery, Devon and Crediton Congregational Church (The Pastoria)
- Photography – David Angel
- Packaging & Inlay design – Brad Waters
- Costume – Hilary Gillespie
- Photography locations – Dumnonii Chronicles Village and Exeter Cathedral
