= Ruth O'Reilly =

Ireland international rugby union player

- Born: 12 August 1981 (age 45) Tralee, Ireland
- Occupation: Marketing manager

Rugby union career
- Position: Prop
Senior career
Years	Team	Apps	(Points)
2002–2017	Galwegians		
International career
Years	Team	Apps	(Points)
2012–17	Ireland	16	

Ruth O'Reilly (born 12 August 1981) is a retired women's rugby union player from Tralee, County Kerry, Ireland. She played as a prop for Galwegians RFC, Connacht Rugby and the Ireland women's national rugby union team.

== Career ==
O'Reilly started playing rugby in 2002. In 2014, she captained Galwegians to victory in the Women's All Ireland League. She also became an assistant coach for Connacht Ladies and the manager of the Ireland women's Under-17 rugby sevens team.

=== International career ===
O'Reilly made her debut for Ireland in 2012. During this same year, she was part of the Ireland women's team that missed a connection and spent 17 hours on an overnight train travelling from Paris to Pau for a Women's Six Nations Championship match against the France women's national rugby union team, arriving only shortly before the match. In 2017, she was selected as part of Ireland's team for the 2017 Women's Rugby World Cup hosted in Ireland. During the tournament, Ireland failed to reach the semi-finals and O'Reilly was forced to leave the team due to injury. Before Ireland's seventh place playoff, she wrote an article published in The Irish Times criticising the Irish Rugby Football Union for a lack of support of women's rugby and the Ireland manager Tom Tierney for having "lost the dressing room". Following Ireland's loss in the playoff in Belfast, Northern Ireland; fellow player Lindsay Peat defended O'Reilly for writing the article after criticism that it was O'Reilly's article that caused Ireland's loss. O'Reilly retired from rugby afterwards.

== Personal life ==
O'Reilly originally worked as a marketing manager at a hotel before moving in 2010 to become a marketing and event manager for a medical company in Galway, County Galway.
