= Lichfield Ladies =

- Full name: Lichfield Ladies Rugby Union Football Club
- Union: RFU

Lichfield Ladies Rugby Union Football Club is a women's rugby union club based in Lichfield, Staffordshire, England. They play their home matches at Cooke Fields and play in the league below the Allianz Women’s Premiership, known as Championship North 1. In previous years, Lichfield Ladies were a part of the Tyrell’s Premier 15s until 2019, when the top level competition evolved into the Allianz Premiership Women’s Rugby - the “PWR”. Lichfield Ladies exists as the pathway team to Premiership side Leicester Tigers Women. Lichfield Ladies are coached by Leicester Tigers Pathway Head Coach Fraser Goatcher and by Tim Westwood. They are the women's team of Lichfield Rugby Union Football Club.

== History ==
Lichfield Ladies were initially founded as part of Lichfield Rugby Union Football Club. They eventually managed to make their way to the Women's Premiership, after three successive promotions, where they have been playing since before 2002. Lichfield Ladies have a local rivalry with fellow Women's Premiership club, Worcester Ladies.

In 2009, they hosted a festival of rugby designed to raise awareness of the 2010 Women's Rugby World Cup which was being held in England. The festival was also intended to gain more players for Lichfield Ladies. Lichfield Ladies' second team plays in RFU Championship Midlands 2. In 2011, they were the only team to defeat Richmond Women in the league. Richmond had previously gone unbeaten until they played Lichfield. Between 2010 and 2013, Lichfield Ladies finished in third position in the Women's Premiership for three consecutive years.

In 2006, there were plans for Lichfield to install an artificial turf pitch at Cooke Fields.

In 2017, Lichfield were disappointed not to be selected for the new Women's Super Rugby. After losing an appeal, they commented that they considered the selection system had been flawed, not based on results, as Lichfield came 3rd in the Women's Premiership, more based on the promise of a future supply of international players as well as bias in the selection process.

== Notable players ==
Lichfield Ladies have had a number of international players play for them. Since 2005, England national women's rugby union team captain, Sarah Hunter has played for Lichfield Ladies. Current Red Roses Captain Zoe Aldcroft is also an alumna of Lichfield Ladies. Emily Braund, Victoria Fleetwood, Georgina Gulliver, Roz Crowley, Natasha Hunt, Amy Cokayne, Justine Lucas, Harriet Millar-Mills, Zoe Aldcroft, Holly Aitchison, Emily Scarratt and Tamara Taylor all played for Lichfield Ladies and England after being included in the England Women's elite playing squad.
