= WWRU National Cup =

The WWRU National Cup is the top national competition for women's rugby union football clubs in Wales.
