= Amy Cokayne =

England international rugby union player

- Full name: Amy Victoria Fiona Cokayne
- Born: 11 July 1996 (age 30) Ipswich, Suffolk, England
- Height: 1.67 m (5 ft 6 in)
- Weight: 82 kg (181 lb)

Rugby union career
- Position: Hooker
- Current team: Sale Sharks Women
Senior career
Years	Team	Apps	(Points)
2014–2017	Lichfield		(0)
2017–2019	Wasps	22	(45)
2019–2023	Harlequins	24	(65)
2023–2025	Leicester Tigers		
2025–	Sale Sharks		
International career
Years	Team	Apps	(Points)
2015–2016	England U20s	4	(0)
2015–	England	94	(235)
Medal record
Representing England
Women's rugby union
Rugby World Cup
Gold medal – first place	2025 England	Team competition
Silver medal – second place	2021 New Zealand	Team competition
Silver medal – second place	2017 Ireland	Team competition

Flight Lieutenant Amy Victoria Fiona Cokayne (born 11 July 1996) is an English rugby union player. She made her international debut for England in 2015 against Italy. She was named in the 2017 Women's Rugby World Cup squad for England and has been named in the squad for every subsequent World Cup up to 2025.

== International career ==
Although Cokayne's family moved to New Zealand when she was nine, she made the choice to train for England after being called up to the New Zealand Women's Rugby Team (the Black Ferns) training camp. She returned to live in England in 2013.

In 2014 she was selected for the England Under 20s team, and made her first appearance for the senior England Women's Rugby Team in 2015. She scored her first senior try for England against Canada in the 2015 Super Series.

Cokayne went on to play in every game in the 2017 Women's Rugby World Cup and was named the second highest try-scorer in the 2017 Women's Six Nations Championship.

In 2019 she was awarded a full time contract with the England team. She missed some games that year, including the 2019 Super Series, as she completed her RAF training. She was named in the England squad for the delayed 2021 Rugby World Cup held in New Zealand in October and November 2022. She scored a hat-trick against the Black Ferns in the 2021 Rugby World Cup final.

Cokayne was part of the England squad that won the inaugural WXV 1 tournament in New Zealand in 2023.

She was called into the Red Roses side for the 2025 Six Nations Championship on 17 March. She was also named in England's squad for the 2025 Women's Rugby World Cup in England.

== Club career ==
After returning to England, Cokayne joined Lichfield Ladies in 2014. In 2017 she moved to Wasps, before joining Harlequins Women in 2019. She left Harlequins at the end of the 2022–23 season and move to Leicester Tigers where she played until the end of the 2024–25 season. She joined Sale Sharks for the 2025–26 season.

== Early life and education ==
Born in Ipswich, Cokayne first played rugby at age six, at Cleve Rugby Club in Bristol. She also played football as goal keeper for Aston Villa Under 10s. Cokayne's father was a big Aston Villa fan: her initials spell out AVFC.

She was nine when her family emigrated to New Zealand in 2006 after her father joined the Royal New Zealand Air Force. She attended Feilding High School and captained the girls' rugby team in 2012, winning 53 consecutive matches. She returned to live in England in 2013.

Cokayne studied for a Bachelor of Science degree in Sports Science at Loughborough college.

In December 2018, Cokayne graduated as a pilot officer in the RAF. She went on to train for the RAF Police.

== Honours ==
England

- Women's Rugby World Cup
  - (gold) Champion (1): 2025
