= All-Ireland Under-18 Ladies' Football Championship =

- Founded: 1980
- Title holders: Cork (14th title)
- Most titles: Cork (14 titles)

The All-Ireland Under-18 Ladies' Football Championship is a "knockout" competition in the game of Gaelic football played by women in Ireland. The series of games are organised by the Ladies' Gaelic Football Association (Irish: Cumann Peil Gael na mBan) and are played during the summer months. All players have to be under 18 years of age.

== Top winners ==
	Team	Wins	Years won
1	Cork	14	1985, 1988, 2003, 2004, 2006, 2007, 2011, 2015, 2016, 2017, 2019, 2022, 2025, 2026
2	Galway	7	2002, 2005, 2010, 2013, 2014, 2018, 2023
3	Waterford	5	1991, 1993, 1996, 1997, 2001
4	Wexford	4	1982, 1983, 1984, 1986
5	Kerry	3	1980, 1981, 1995
5	Monaghan	3	1994, 1998, 1999
7	Clare	2	1989, 1990
7	Dublin	2	2008, 2012
9	Mayo	1	1987
9	Laois	1	1992
9	Tyrone	1	2000
9	Donegal	1	2009
9	Cavan	1	2024

== Roll of honour ==
Year	Winner	Score	Opponent	Score
2026	Cork	0-11	Roscommon	0-07
2025	Cork	3–11	Dublin	3–02
2024	Cavan	4-11	Kerry	4-08
2023	Galway	3-11	Kildare	1-08
2022	Cork	1-16	Galway	1-08
2021	No competition			
2020	No competition			
2019	Cork	4-11	Monaghan	1-08
2018	Galway	5-07	Cork	2-15
2017	Cork	5-11	Galway	1-04
2016	Cork	2-19	Dublin	4-09
2015	Cork	3-10	Galway	2-04
2014	Galway	3-21	Cork	4-13
2013	Galway	3-13	Dublin	2-14
2012	Dublin	3-09	Tyrone	3-07
2011	Cork	5-15	Dublin	4-11
2010	Galway	1-15	Donegal	1-11
2009	Donegal	5-13	Clare	5-05
2008	Dublin	2-18	Tyrone	1-04
2007	Cork	6-08	Dublin	2-10
2006	Cork	1-22 (R) 3-08	Galway	0-08 (R) 2-11
2005	Galway	5-07	Donegal	1-08
2004	Cork	4-17	Laois	0-08
2003	Cork	1-15	Mayo	3-05
2002	Galway		Cork	
2001	Waterford	6-12	Meath	2-06
2000	Tyrone	1-06	Waterford	7-12
1999	Monaghan		Mayo	
1998	Monaghan		Mayo	
1997	Waterford		Mayo	
1996	Waterford	5-11	Mayo	2-06
1995	Kerry	4-08	Wexford	4-03
1994	Monaghan		Wexford	
1993	Waterford	4-09	Wexford	1-05
1992	Laois	4-05	Waterford	2-08
1991	Waterford	6-17	Roscommon	1-03
1990	Clare		Dublin	
1989	Clare		Laois	
1988	Cork		Wexford	
1987	Mayo		Cork	
1986	Wexford		Clare	
1985	Cork		Wexford	
1984	Wexford		Cork	
1983	Wexford		Leitrim	
1982	Wexford		Leitrim	
1981	Kerry	3-08	Wexford	2-05
1980	Kerry	10-07	Cavan	2-01

== Minor B Championship ==
Year	Winner	Score	Opponent	Score
2026	Kerry	1-12	Tyrone	1-10
2025	Clare	1-08	Sligo	0-07
2024	Sligo	1-13	Tyrone	0-07
2023	Kerry	2-06	Sligo	1-06
2022	Monaghan	7-16	Longford	2-19
2021	No competition			
2020	No competition			
2019	Longford	2-09	Roscommon	2-05
2018	Kildare	2-15	Roscommon	2-06
2017	Clare	3-11	Meath	4-07
2016	Meath	4-09	Roscommon	3-01
2015	Tipperary	3-12	Armagh	3-08
2014	Tipperary	7-15	Offaly	1-03
2013	Clare	2-13	Laois	4-09
2012	Clare	4-16	Roscommon	3-11
2011	Armagh	5-15	Wicklow	3-16
2010	Wexford	3-11	Tipperary	3-07
2009	Roscommon	2-07	Tipperary	1-07

== Minor C Championship ==
Year	Winner	Score	Opponent	Score
2026	Armagh	4-18	Longford	0-09
2025	Waterford	5-20	Westmeath	3-10
2024	Waterford	6-08	Armagh	5-10
2023	Donegal	1-14	Waterford	1-09
2022	Clare	3-13	Wicklow	3-12

== Outside Sources ==
- Ladies Gaelic Roll of Honour
