= Mhairi Grieve =

- Born: January 18, 1994 (age 32)
- University: University of Edinburgh

Rugby union career
- Position: Scrum-half
Senior career
Years	Team	Apps	(Points)
2020-	Sale Sharks		
International career
Years	Team	Apps	(Points)
2014-2019	Scotland		

Mhairi Grieve (born 18 Jan 1994) is a Women's rugby union player in Scotland. She is a current member of the Scotland Women's National Rugby Union Team.

== Rugby career ==
Grieve played rugby while attending University of Edinburgh, also playing club rugby for RHC Cougars. She represented Scotland under-20s, and was called up to the national team in 2014. She made her debut in 2014 to Italy. Grieve played in 2019 Six Nations. She signed with the Sale Sharks in May 2020.

== Personal life ==
When she graduated from university, Grieve moved down to Manchester to work as a vet and she has been based in the city ever since.
