= Jim Causley =

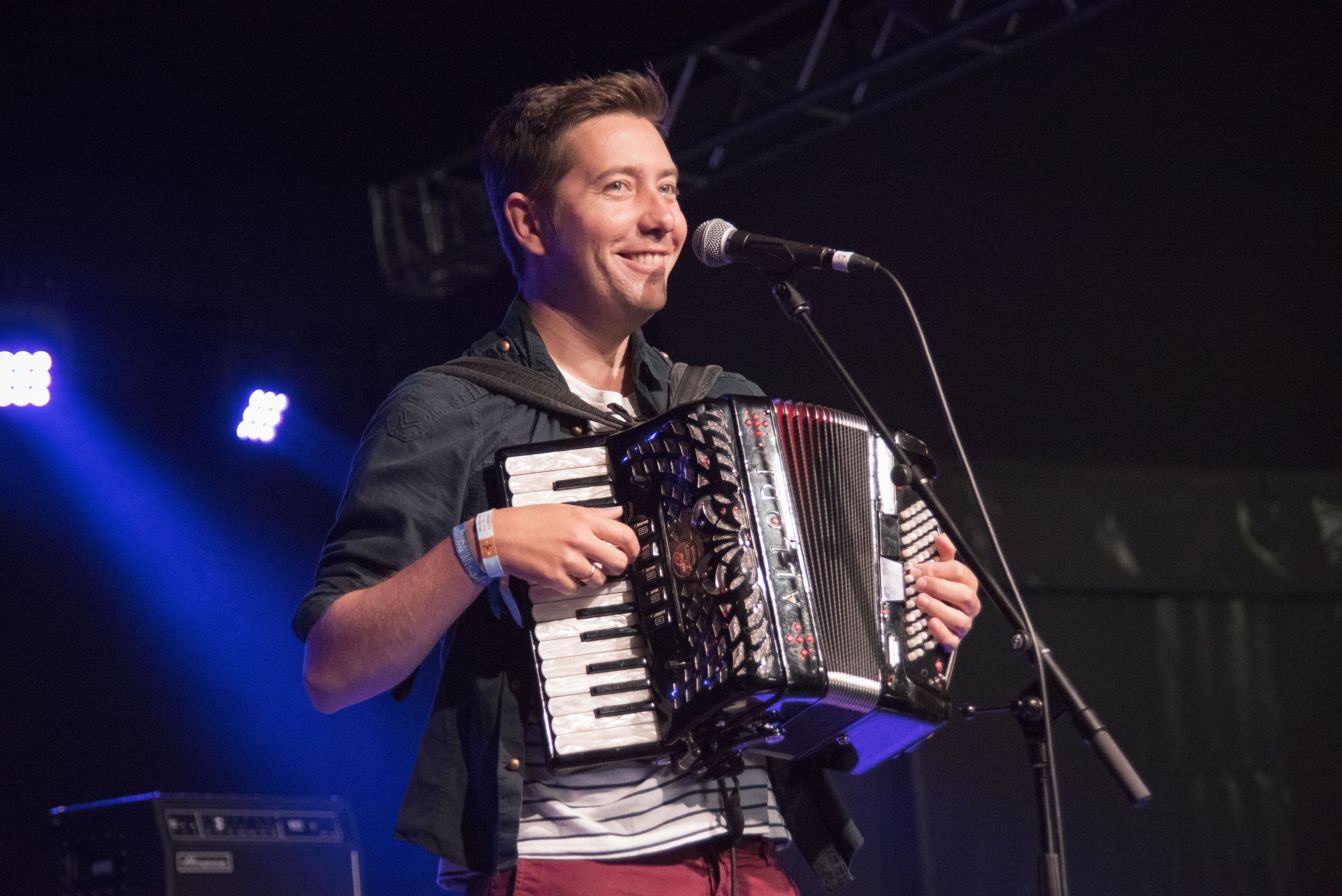
- Causley in 2015

Background information
- Born: 2 November 1980 (age 46)
- Origin: Devon, England; Clyst Vale Community College; University of Newcastle upon Tyne (BMus)
- Genre: Traditional folk music
- Years active: 1999 – present
- Labels: WildGoose Records, Navigator Records, Folk Police Recordings, Hands On Music,

Jim Causley (born 1980) is a British folk singer, songwriter, and musician from Devon who specializes in the traditional songs and music of the West Country. Journalist Colin Irwin has called him "the finest singer of his generation".

== Biography ==
Causley hails from the village of Whimple in East Devon, Causley was born in Mowbray House, Heavitree, Exeter and is a relative of the Cornish poet Charles Causley. He was christened in the Saxon font at St Michael & All Angels church, Pinhoe. He attended Whimple County Primary School and then secondary school at Clyst Vale Community College.

Described by Mojo Magazine as "the finest singer of his generation", Causley grew up in an area rich in traditional music; his home village in the heart of Cider Country with its thriving wassailing tradition and its close proximity to Sidmouth and Dartmoor folk festivals. After studying Performing Arts and Jazz & Popular Music at Exeter College, Causley went on to study Folk and Traditional Music at the University of Newcastle upon Tyne. It was during this time that he began gaining a reputation as talented singer on the wider UK folk scene.

Causley released his debut album, Fruits of the Earth, on WildGoose Records in 2005. Noted for his rich, fruity bass voice and cheeky stage presence, Causley guested with Martyn Wyndham-Read on his Song Links 2 (Fellside Records) album which linked English traditional songs with their American variants. In 2006 Causley was nominated for a BBC Radio 2 Folk Award under the Horizon Award (best newcomer) category and in 2007 his vocal trio, The Devil's Interval, were nominated for the same award again. With The Devil's Interval, Causley has toured with Waterson–Carthy as part of their annual Frost and Fire tour for six consecutive years and in 2006 collaborated with them on their album Holy Heathens and the Old Green Man (Topic Records). The Devil's Interval also released their debut album in that year, Blood & Honey (WildGoose Records), to good reviews and a cover article in fRoots magazine.

After graduating from university, Causley returned home to Devon and since then he has worked with Scottish fiddle player John McCusker in his Under One Sky project uniting the English and Scottish traditions and also toured and recorded with Essex instrumental quartet Mawkin as Mawkin:Causley, David Rotheray of The Beautiful South fame alongside Eleanor McEvoy and Bella Hardy for Rotheray's 'Life of Birds' album and tours, Michael Morpurgo, Show of Hands for their Arrogance, Ignorance & Greed as well as their 'Centenary; Word & Music of the First World War' albums and Kate Rusby for her 20th anniversary album & tour among others. 2013 saw the release of perhaps Causley's most celebrated works to date; Cyprus Well, an album of his settings of poems by his relative, the Cornish poet Charles Causley named after and recorded in the late poets house, Cyprus Well in Launceston, Cornwall. This album featured Causley mostly playing piano as opposed to accordion and also saw him collaborating with Julie Murphy of the Welsh band Fernhill alongside Welsh-Canadian harpist Ceri Owen-Jones and members of Cornish band Dalla as well as the Pete Berryman Trio. Much of the album Cyprus Well was used in the soundtrack to Cornish filmmaker Jane Darke's film The Poet about the life of Charles Causley, which first aired on BBC4 TV on Sunday 1 October 2017.

In 2016 Causley released two albums; the first was Forgotten Kingdom, his first ever album of entirely self-penned songs which was released on the Show of Hands label and featured a large cast of well regarded West Country musicians. The second album of 2016 was a commission by the Bodmin Moor Poetry Festival following Causley's work with the poems of Charles Causley on Cyprus Well the BMPF invited Causley to create a similar project with another Cornish poet whose centenary was that year; Jack Clemo a close friend of Charles Causley who was best man at his wedding. Jim worked with author and Clemo expert Dr Luke Thompson to create this album and enlisted the help of a small group of Cornish musicians plus a children's choir from the school near to where Clemo lived for two of the tracks. This album featured Causley's most piano-heavy and experimental works to date.

== Discography ==
- Jim Causley - Many a Mile EP (2000 Self Release)
- Coffee House Three - Retro Sky EP (2001 Self Release)
- Jim Causley - Jim Causley EP (2003 Hrōc Music)
- Jim Causley – Fruits of the Earth (2005 WildGoose)
- The Devil's Interval – Blood & Honey (2006 WildGoose)
- Jim Causley – Lost Love Found (2007 WildGoose)
- Mawkin:Causley – Cold Ruin (2008 Navigator)
- Mawkin:Causley – The Awkward Recruit (2009 Navigator)
- Jim Causley – Dumnonia (2011 WildGoose)
- Jim Causley – Cyprus Well (2013 Folk Police Recordings)
- Jim Causley – Forgotten Kingdom (2015 Hands on Music)
- Jim Causley & Luke Thompson – The Clay Hymnal: Poems of Jack Clemo (2016 WestWords Publishing)
- Jim Causley & Friends – I Am The Song; Charles Causley's Poems for Children (2017 WildGoose)
- The Band of Love – Folk Fever (2018 Universal/Island Records)
- Jim Causley – Special Commissions EP (2018 Hrōc Music)
- Jim Causley – A Causley Christmas! (2018 Hrōc Music)
- Jim Causley – Live in Widecombe! (2019 Hrōc Music)
- Jim Causley – Cyprus Well II (2020 Hrōc Music)
- Jim Causley – Devonshire Roses (2020 Hrōc Music)
- Jim Causley – Devonia (2021 Hrōc Music)
- Jim Causley & Friends – Songs of Dartmoor (2023 Hrōc Music)
- Jim Causley & Miranda Sykes - Baring-Gould Centenary (2024 Sykes/Causley)
- Jim Causley & Miranda Sykes - Everything Possible (2025 Sykes/Causley)
- Jim Causley – The Georgic (2025 Hrōc Music)
- Jim Causley & Miranda Sykes - Midwinter (2025 Sykes/Causley)

== Guest appearances ==
- Various – Song Links II (2005 Fellside)
- Waterson–Carthy – Holy Heathens and the Old Green Man (2006 Topic Records)
- Various Artists – The Mother of all Morris (2007 Talking Elephant)
- Jackie Oates – The Violet Hour (2008 Chudleigh Roots)
- Jim Moray – Low Culture (2008 NIAG)
- Bill Murray & Friends – Dow 'pon Ole Dartymoor (2008 Wren Music)
- Mick Groves – Still Spinning (2008 Exe Records)
- John McCusker – Under One Sky (2009 Navigator Records)
- Ella Edmondson – Hold Your Horses (2009 Monsoon Records)
- Show of Hands – Arrogance Ignorance and Greed (2009 Hands on Music)
- David Rotheray – The Life of Birds (2010 Proper)
- Phil Beer – Box Set One (2010 Chudleigh Roots)
- Michael Morpurgo – In Tune With the World: The Poetry of Seán Rafferty (2010 Brown Label)
- The Woodbine & Ivy Band (2011 Folk Police Recordings)
- Mawkin – Crow (2012 Good Form)
- The Imagined Village – Bending the Dark (2012 Real World)
- Kate Rusby – 20 (2012 Pure Records/Island Records)
- Richard Trethewey – Dig Where You Stand (2012 self-release)
- Gavin Davenport – The Bone Orchard (2013 Haystack)
- Show of Hands – Centenary: Words & Music of the Great War (2014 U.M.T.V.)
- Maggie Duffy – Closer to Home (2015 PFRD Records)
- Hannah Sanders & Ben Savage – Before the Sun (2016 Sungrazing)
- Tony Dean – Last Orders (2016 Estate of Tony Dean)
- Geoff Lakeman – After All These Years – 2016
- Chris Foster (folk singer) – Hadelin – 2017
- Owen Ralph - Chamber Folk (2018 Binnorie Records)
- The Band of Love - Folk Fever (2018 Island/Universal Records)

== Compilations ==
- Various – 2006 BBC Radio 2 Folk Awards (2005 Proper)
- Various – 2007 BBC Radio 2 Folk Awards (2006 Proper)
- Various – Folk Rising (2007 Proper)
- Various – 2009 BBC Radio 2 Folk Awards (2008 Proper)
- Various – Folk Rising 2 (2008 Proper)
- Various – Beginners Guide to English Folk (2008 Nascente)
- Various – 2010 BBC Radio 2 Folk Awards (2009 Proper)
- Various – 2017 BBC Radio 2 Folk Awards (2017 Proper)

== Awards and nominations ==
- 2006 BBC Radio 2 Folk Awards – Horizon Award (best newcomer)
- 2007 BBC Radio 2 Folk Awards – Horizon Award – The Devil's Interval
- 2009 BBC Radio 2 Folk Awards – Best Group – Mawkin:Causley
- 2010 BBC Radio 2 Folk Awards – Best Group – Mawkin:Causley
- 2010 BBC Radio 2 Folk Awards – Best Traditional Song – Mawkin:Causley
- 2013 The Telegraph Top Ten Folk Albums of the Year (Cyprus Well)
- 2014 Spiral Earth awards – Male Singer of the Year winner
- 2016 Mojo Magazine – Top Ten Folk Albums of the Year (Forgotten Kingdom)
- 2017 BBC Radio 2 Folk Awards – Singer of the Year
- 2017 Gorsedh Kernow – The Mike Hartland Award for work which engages people in Cornish culture – The Clay Hymnal by Jim Causley
