= Rachel Taylor (rugby union) =

Wales international rugby union footballer (born 1983)

- Born: 13 June 1983 (age 43) Bangor, Gwynedd, Wales
- Height: 1.75 m (5 ft 9 in)
- Weight: 75 kg (11 st 11 lb)
- School: Aberaeron
- University: Cardiff Metropolitan University
- Occupation: Paraveterinary worker

Rugby union career
- Position: Lock/back row
Senior career
Years	Team	Apps	(Points)
20xx–	Bristol Ladies		
20xx–	Newport Gwent Dragons		
International career
Years	Team	Apps	(Points)
2007–2017	Wales	67	
- Correct as of 25 May 2017

Rachel Taylor (born 13 June 1983) is a Welsh former rugby union player who played in either Lock or back row for the Bristol Ladies, Newport Gwent Dragons and the Wales women's national rugby union team. She won her first international cap against Canada in 2007, and later captained the team. Following retirement in 2018, she became the first female head coach of a WRU National League club side when she took over Colwyn Bay, before becoming the skills coach for Wales Women between November 2020 and February 2021. In September 2021, Taylor joined Premiership Women's Rugby team Sale Sharks Women as the club's performance coach. In September 2025, she joined the coaching team of Loughborough Lightning.

== Early life ==
Rachel Taylor was born in Bangor in Gwynedd, Wales, on 13 June 1983. She began playing rugby at the age of five, later describing her family as "rugby-orientated" since her father was a rugby coach and her older brother already played for a local team. Although she tried a variety of sports in her youth, she returned to rugby. Once her brother switched to playing association football, she focused on rugby, seeking to play for her national team. She is trained as a Paraveterinary worker, and gave the keynote speech at the British Veterinary Association in 2017.

== Playing career ==
As of 2017, her official Wales Rugby Union biography stated that she is 1.75 metres (5.7 ft) tall and weighs 75 kilograms (11.8 st). She has been given the nickname "Tails" by her teammates. She made her debut for the Wales women's national rugby union team against Canada in 2007. She was first named as captain of the team in 2012 for the Women's Six Nations Championship.

Taylor won her 50th cap for Wales when she played against Ireland in the 2015 Women's Six Nations Championship. She continued to captain her national team, including at the 2016 Women's Six Nations Championship. She was also involved in encouraging women's rugby at a grassroots level, being the Wales Rugby Union coordinator for the RGC West area in North Wales. This was in preparation for a transition from her playing career into retirement.

== Coaching career ==
Following retirement from her playing career in 2018, Taylor became the first female head coach of a WRU National League club side when she took over Colwyn Bay, before becoming the skills coach for Wales Women between November 2020 and February 2021.

In September 2021, Taylor joined Premiership Women's Rugby team Sale Sharks Women as the club's performance coach. She rose to head coach. In January 2025, she announced that she would step down from the Sale Sharks at the end of the Premiership Women’s Rugby season.

In May 2025, Taylor was announced as joining the coaching team of Loughborough Lightning for the 2025/26 Premiership Women’s Rugby season.

== Honours ==
In July 2022, Taylor was awarded an Honorary Degree by Bangor University.
