= Justine Lucas =

England international rugby union player

- Born: 3 May 1990 (age 36)
- Height: 1.76 m (5 ft 9 1/2 in)
- Weight: 85 kg (187 lb; 13 st 5 lb)

Rugby union career
- Position: Prop
Senior career
Years	Team	Apps	(Points)
2017	Wasps Ladies		
2013	Aylesford Bulls Ladies		
2013	Lichfield Ladies		
International career
Years	Team	Apps	(Points)
2013–2018	England	33	(5)
Medal record
Representing England
Women's rugby union
Rugby World Cup
Silver medal – second place	2017 Ireland	Team competition

Justine Kerry Lucas (born 3 May 1990) is an English rugby union player. She represents England and made her debut in 2013. She was named in the 2017 Women's Rugby World Cup squad for England.

Lucas began her rugby career at the age of 20 in her final year at Loughborough University where she attained a degree in Sports Science and Maths. She signed with Wasps Ladies for the Premier 15s in 2017.
