= Laura Keates =

England international rugby union player

- Born: 5 August 1988 (age 38) Awali, Bahrain
- Height: 1.66 m (5 ft 5 1/2 in)
- Weight: 85 kg (187 lb; 13 st 5 lb)

Rugby union career
- Position: Prop
Senior career
Years	Team	Apps	(Points)
- Worcester Warriors Women
International career
Years	Team	Apps	(Points)
	England	62	(20)
–	England U20		
–	England U19		
Medal record
Women's rugby union
Rugby World Cup
Gold medal – first place	2014 France	Team competition

Laura Siu-Lan Keates (born 5 August 1988) is a Bahrainian-born English rugby union player.

== Career ==
Keates debuted for England in 2011 and played at the 2014 Women's Rugby World Cup in France. Keates captained the England Women's under 19 team in 2007. She injured her Achilles while preparing for the 2017 World Cup, and didn't play again for England until the 25 - 23 win over France on 21 November 2020. She was named in the England squad for the delayed 2021 Rugby World Cup held in New Zealand in October and November 2022 but was forced to withdraw from the squad after suffering an anterior cruciate ligament injury in training.

== Personal life ==
Keates studied zoology at Birmingham University (BSc Zoology 2010) and is studying dentistry at the same university
