= Tom Tierney (rugby union) =

Irish rugby union player and coach (1976–2023)

Tom Tierney (1 September 1976 – 24 February 2023) was an Irish rugby union footballer and coach.

Tierney was born in Limerick on 1 September 1976. He played at scrum-half for Richmond, Garryowen, Munster, Galwegians, Connacht, Leicester and Ireland. He won eight international caps in 1999 and 2000. He previously coached Garryowen FC, Cork Constitution FC, Glenstal Abbey School, which he led to a Limerick City Senior School's cup win, and the Ireland women's team.

After transitioning into coaching, the Limerick native held head coaching positions at Crescent College Comprehensive SJ, Garryowen, Cork Constitution, and the Ireland Club XV team.

Starting in 2014, Tierney took on various coaching roles within the IRFU, including leading both the Ireland women's Sevens and 15s teams for three years. During his tenure with the women's 15s side, he guided them to victory in the 2015 Six Nations Championship. He also worked with Ireland's Under-19 and Under-20 men's teams.

Most recently, Tierney served as the IRFU national talent coach, based at the Munster Academy.

== Death ==
Tierney died suddenly on 24 February 2023, at the age of 46.
