= 2024 Super Rugby Women's season =

Australian women's rugby union season

- Countries: Australia (5 teams); Fiji (1 team)
- Tournament format(s): Round-robin and knockout
- Champions: New South Wales Waratahs (5th title)
- Matches played: 18
- Top point scorer(s): Arabella McKenzie, Waratahs (67)
- Top try scorer(s): Maya Stewart, Waratahs (13)
- Official website: Super Rugby Women's

The 2024 Super Rugby Women's season was the seventh edition of the Super Rugby Women's, the Australian domestic competition of the male counterpart. The season began on 15 March, with the Grand Final concluding the season on 28 April.

The New South Wales Waratahs defeated the Fijiana Drua in the Grand Final 50–14 at Ballymore Stadium, Brisbane.

== Competition format ==
Teams were to play three pre-season games, which saw Australian teams host sides from Oceania and Japan. The season featured twelve double-headers alongside the Super Rugby fixtures in both Australia and Fiji. The top four teams at the end of the regular season qualified for the Semi-finals where they competed for a place in the Grand Final, which was held on 28 April.

== Competition ==
=== Ladder ===
Pos	Team	Pld	W	D	L	PF	PA	PD	TB	LB	Pts	Qualification
1	New South Wales Waratahs (C)	5	5	0	0	224	88	+136	4	0	24	Advance to Finals
2	Fijiana Drua	5	3	0	2	113	129	−16	1	0	13 (Note: Head-to-head: Fijiana Drua 19–5 Western Force)	Advance to Finals
3	Western Force	5	3	0	2	124	126	−2	1	0	13	Advance to Finals
4	ACT Brumbies	5	2	0	3	108	139	−31	2	0	10	Advance to Finals
5	Melbourne Rebels	5	1	0	4	100	136	−36	2	1	7	
6	Queensland Reds	5	1	0	4	85	136	−51	0	0	4	

Source: Super Rugby Women's
Rules for classification: Tiebreakers for teams tied on points: 1) Number of matches won; 2) Head-to-head record; 3) Difference between points for and against; 4) Total number of points for.
(C) Champion

=== Regular season ===
==== Round 1 ====
15 March
16:30 AEST (UTC+8)

(1 BP) Western Force	36–12	Melbourne Rebels
Try: Wigley 10' m McGehan (2) 26' c, 47' m Hifo 37' c Hume 66' m Leaula 79' c Con: Wood (3/6) 27', 39', 80'	Report	Try: Kohika-Skipper 41' c Nuku 42' m Con: Siataga (1/2) 42'

Perth Rectangular Stadium, Perth
Referee: Dominic Carlson

16 March
18:05 AEDT (UTC+11)

(1 BP) New South Wales Waratahs	45–10	ACT Brumbies
Try: Stewart (3) 2' m, 55' m, 73' c Duck (2) 12' c, 40' c Friedrichs 60' c Bird 78' m Con: McKenzie (5/7) 4', 13', 41', 61', 74'	Report	Try: Fuesaina 49' c Con: Moleka (1/1) 51'; Pen: Moleka (1/1) 32'

Sydney Football Stadium, Sydney
Referee: Jessica Ling

17 March
15:35 AEDT (UTC+10)

Queensland Reds	21–32	Fijiana Drua (1 BP)
Try: Molloy 15' c Penalty try 57'; Sauaso 63' c Con: Cramer (2/2) 16', 63'	Report	Try: Tinanivalu 19' m Neivosa (2) 36' m, 77' m Va'aga Arei 41' m Korovata 53' c Waisega 64' m Con: Tisolo (1/6) 54'

Ballymore Stadium, Brisbane
Referee: Ella Goldsmith

==== Round 2 ====
22 March
17:05 AEDT (UTC+11)

ACT Brumbies	24–22	Melbourne Rebels (1 BP)
Try: Moleka 6' m Naden (2) 36' m, 61' c Paku 50' c Con: Moleka (2/4) 51', 62'	Report	Try: Kawa 10' m Nuku (2) 39' m, 45' c Mayes 57' m Con: Siataga (1/4) 46'

Canberra Stadium, Canberra
Referee: Sarah Porter

23 March
14:05 AEDT (UTC+8)

Western Force	24–14	Queensland Reds
Try: Kashiwagi 11' c Cline 25' c Malcolm 58' m Ma'ake 68' m Con: Wood (2/4) 11', 27'	Report	Try: Molloy 2' c Urwin 65' c Con: Cramer (2/2) 3', 66'

Perth Rectangular Stadium, Perth
Referee: Ben Jones

23 March
13:35 FJT (UTC+12)

Fijiana Drua	21–62	New South Wales Waratahs (1 BP)
Try: Milinia 18' c Matarugu 23' c Cumu 47' c Con: Tisolo (3/3) 19', 24', 48'	Report	Try: Stewart (2) 2' c, 16' m Leaney 6' c O'Gorman 31' m Merlo 45' c Miller (2) 54' m, 69' c Friedrichs 60' c Karpani 63' m Churchill 77' c Con: McKenzie (6/8) 3', 7', 46', 60', 71', 79'

Churchill Park, Lautoka
Referee: Ella Goldsmith

==== Round 3 ====
29 March
17:05 AEDT (UTC+11)

New South Wales Waratahs	38–17	Melbourne Rebels
Try: Stewart (2) 8', 35'; Friedrichs 20'; Miller (2) 23', 47'; Robinson 79'; Con: McKenzie (4/6) 21', 36', 48', 80'	Report	Try: Mamea 53'; Nuku 64'; Con: Siataga (1/1) 54'; Freeman (1/1) 65'; Pen: Siataga (1/1) 12'

Sydney Football Stadium, Sydney
Referee: Ella Goldsmith

30 March
13:35 FJT (UTC+12)

Fijiana Drua	19–5	Western Force
Try: Waisega 14'; Milinia 32'; Cumu 49'; Con: Tisolo (2/3) 33', 50'	Report	Try: Ebbage 44'; Con: Wood (0/1) 46'

Churchill Park, Lautoka
Referee: Sarah Porter

30 March
16:05 AEST (UTC+10)

Queensland Reds	14–31	ACT Brumbies
Try: Patu 37'; Kreis 78'; Con: Cramer (2/2) 38', 79'	Report	Try: Fuesaina 18'; McCalman (2) 26', 32'; Palu 43'; Tuinakauvadra 66'; Con: Moleka (3/5) 19', 44', 67'

Lang Park, Brisbane
Referee: Jessica Ling

==== Round 4 ====
5 April
17:05 AEDT (UTC+11)

Melbourne Rebels	15–17	Queensland Reds
Try: Nuku 43'; Kawa 54'; Con: Siataga (1/2) 45'; Pen: Siataga (1/2) 70'	Report	Try: Sauaso (2/2) 7', 19'; Con: Cramer (2/2) 9', 20'; Pen: Cramer (1/2) 58'

Melbourne Rectangular Stadium, Melbourne
Referee: Sarah Porter

6 April
15:05 AEST (UTC+8)

Western Force	21–45	New South Wales Waratahs
Try: Leonard 74'; Nona 82'; Con: Ledington (1/2) 83'; Pen: Wood (3/3) 21', 25', 29'	Report	Try: Nathan (2) 3', 37'; Halse 16'; Merlo (2) 33', 48'; Morgan 43'; Stewart 61'; Con: McKenzie (5/7) 4', 39', 45', 49', 62'

UWA Sports Park, Perth
Referee: Ben Jones

6 April
17:05 AEDT (UTC+11)

ACT Brumbies	7–20	Fijiana Drua
Try: Naden 23'; Con: Moleka (1/1) 24'	Report	Try: Waisega 11'; Buna 52'; Con: Tisolo (2/2) 12', 53'; Pen: Tisolo (2/2) 35', 71'

Canberra Stadium, Canberra
Referee: Harry Fenton

==== Round 5 ====
12 April
17:05 AEST (UTC+10)

New South Wales Waratahs	34–19	Queensland Reds
Try: Lafai 5'; Halse 7'; Miller 43'; Stewart 59'; Barker 79'; Con: McKenzie (2/4) 5', 8'; Miller (1/1) 80'; Pen: McKenzie (1/1) 41'	Report	Try: Molloy 34'; Jacoby 64'; Smith 73'; Con: Cramer (2/3) 35', 64'

Sydney Football Stadium, Sydney
Referee: Jessica Ling

13 April
14:35 AEST (UTC+10)

ACT Brumbies	36–38	Western Force
Try: Naden (3) 22', 29', 60'; Fuesaina 38'; Bishop 77'; Con: Moleka (4/5) 23', 30', 39', 77'; Pen: Moleka (1/1) 19'	Report	Try: Malcolm (2) 2', 12'; Teki-Joyce 15'; Cline (2) 54', 65'; Palelei 57'; Con: Wood (4/6) 13', 56', 58', 66'

Viking Park, Canberra
Referee: Tyler Miller

13 April
17:05 AEST (UTC+10)

Melbourne Rebels	34–21	Fijiana Drua
Try: Kohika-Skipper 17'; Marsters (2) 43', 78'; Sauto 53'; Con: Siataga (3/3) 18', 44', 55'; Freeman (1/1) 79'; Pen: Siataga (2/2) 7', 40'	Report	Try: Buna (2 ) 2', 70'; Matarugu 36'; Con: Kinita (2/2) 3', 37'; Tisolo (1/1) 71'

Melbourne Rectangular Stadium, Melbourne
Referee: Harry Fenton

=== Finals ===
==== Bracket ====
Semi-finals
19 April – HFC Bank Stadium
Fijiana Drua	25
Western Force	14
19 April – Sydney Football Stadium
New South Wales Waratahs	47
ACT Brumbies	27

Grand Final
28 April – Ballymore Stadium
New South Wales Waratahs	50
Fijiana Drua	14

==== Semi-finals ====
19 April
16:35 AEST (UTC+10)

Fijiana Drua	25–14	Western Force
Try: Buna (3) 18', 46', 79'; Korovata 39'; Con: Kinita (1/1) 80'; Pen: Rokouono (1/2) 65'	Report	Try: Ma’ake 26'; Pen: Wood (3/3) 10', 23', 44'

HFC Bank Stadium, Suva
Referee: Harry Fenton

19 April
17:45 AEST (UTC+10)

New South Wales Waratahs	47–27	ACT Brumbies
Try: Stewart (2) 2', 63'; Friedrichs13'; Miller (3) 17', 26', 57'; Volkman 78'; Con: McKenzie (6/7) 3', 15', 18', 27', 58', 79'	Report	Try: Dawa 8'; Holland 30'; Fuesaina 46'; Sikimeti 68'; Con: Moleka (2/4) 47', 69'; Pen: Moleka (1/1) 42'

Sydney Football Stadium, Sydney
Referee: Jessica Ling

==== Grand Final ====
28 April
16:00 AEST (UTC+10)

New South Wales Waratahs	50–14	Fijiana Drua
Try: Miller (3) 11', 23', 51'; Stewart (2) 14', 55'; Penalty Try 50'; Friedrichs 68'; Lafai 72'; Con: McKenzie (4/7) 25', 52', 69', 73'	Report	Try: Penalty Try 30'; Naisewa 42'; Con: Rokouono (1/1) 43'

Ballymore Stadium, Brisbane
Referee: Jessica Ling

== Players ==
=== Squads ===
Super Rugby Women's Squads named for 2024 season.

ACT Brumbies Women squad
Forwards	Allana Sikimeti • Benita Ese Sale • Hannah Stewart • Sally Fuesaina • Iris Verebalavu • Erika Maslen • Tania Naden • Ash Fernandez • Jaimie Studdy • Jess Grant • Kate Holland • Lily Bone • Neomai Vunga • Katalina Amosa • Chioma Enyi • Loretta Mailangi • Lydia Kavoa • Siokapesi Palu (c) • Tabua Tuinakauvadra
Backs	Bonnie Brewer • Jasmin Huriwai • Becka Marsters • Faitala Moleka • Harmony Ioane • Jemima McCalman • Kayla Sauvao • Martha Fua • Anastasia Martin • Joanne Butler • Ashlea Bishop • Biola Dawa • Kolora Lomani • Kyah Little • Gabrielle Petersen
Coach	Scott Fava

Fijian Drua Women squad
Forwards	Anasimeci Korovata • Salanieta Nabuli • Loraini Seiniloli • Mereoni Vonosere • Tiana Robanakadavu • Siteri Rasolea • Litia Marama • Keleni Marawa • Vika Matarugu • Una Lalabalavu • Mereoni Nakesa • Jade Coates • Asinate Serevi • Nunia Uluikadavu • Merevesi Ofakimalino • Fulori Nabura • Sulita Waisega • Merewai Nasilasila • Karalaini Naisewa
Backs	Noelani Baselala • Setaita Railumu • Evivi Senikarivi • Merewalesi Rokouono • Salanieta Kinita • Jeniffer Ravutia • Merewai Cumu • Litiana Lawedrau • Merewairita Neivosa • Vani Arei • Adita Milinia • Iva Sauira • Atelaite Buna • Repeka Aditove • Luisa Tisolo
Coach	Mosese Rauluni

Melbourne Rebels Women squad
Forwards	Laiema Bosenavulagi • Ana Mamea • Hayley Glass • Jiowana Sauto • Paula Ioane • Jayme Nuku • Ashley Marsters (c) • Mary Tua'ana • Easter Savelio • Tiarah Minns • Fapiola Uoifaleahi • Laetitia Bobo • Mel Kawa (vc) • Sui Pauaraisa • Hollie Twidale • Sydney Niupulusu • Grace Hamilton
Backs	Lucy Brown • Cassie Siataga • Sarah Hogan • Crystal Mayes • Harmony Vatau • Grace Freeman • Georgia Fowler • Tasmin Barber • Halley Derera • Tyra Boysen-Auimatagi • Mia-Rae Clifford • Chanelle Kohika-Skipper • Teuila Pritchard • Millicent Scutt
Coach	Jason Rogers

NSW Waratahs Women squad
Forwards	Brianna Hoy • Bridie O'Gorman • Emily Robinson • Eva Karpani • Georgia Chapple • Suisuiosalafai Volkman • Adiana Talakai • Brittany Merlo • Millie Parker • Annabelle Codey • Atasi Lafai • Hollie Cameron • Kaitlan Leaney • Sera Naiqama • Emily Chancellor • Leilani Nathan • Piper Duck • Skye Churchill
Backs	Layne Morgan • Martha Harvey • Tatum Bird • Arabella McKenzie • Waiaria Ellis • Georgina Friedrichs • Katrina Barker • Jade Sheridan • Rosie Ferguson • Caitlyn Halse • Desirée Miller • Jacinta Windsor • Maya Stewart
Coach	Michael Ruthven

Queensland Reds Women squad
Forwards	Charli Jacoby • Janita Kareta • Madi Schuck • Liz Patu • Maletina Brown • Theresa Soloai • Tiarna Molloy • Isabelle Robinson • Deni Ross • Aleena Greenhalgh • Doreen Narokete • Jemma Bemrose • Carola Kreis • Lucy Thorpe • Haidee Head • Grace Baker • April Ngatupuna
Backs	Sarah Dougherty • Natalie Wright • Carys Dallinger • Ava Wereta • Cecilia Smith (c) • Shalom Sauaso • Alana Elisaia • Mercedez Taulelei-Siala • Briana Dascombe • Ivania Wong • Caitlin Urwin • Dianne Waight • Lori Cramer • Ashlee Knight • Mel Wilks
Coach	Grant Anderson

Western Force Women squad
Forwards	Natsuki Kashiwagi • Hinata Komaki • Alapeta Ngauamo • Hannah Palelei • Harono Te Iringa • Braxton Walker • Sara Cline • Hera-Barb Malcolm Heke • Rosie Ebbage • Michaela Leonard • Libya Teepa • Alanis Toia • Emilya Byrne • Tamika Jones • Keira MacAskill • Anneka Stephens • Pia Tapsell • Brooklyn Teki-Joyce • Seneti Kilisimasi
Backs	Kendra Fell • Saelua Leaula • Samantha Wood • Nicole Ledington • Renae Nona • Trilleen Pomare (c) • Zoe Gillard • Haylee Hifo • Rosie McGehan • Ariana Ruru-Hinaki • Dallys Tini • Numi Tupaea • Siutiti Ma'ake • Sheree Hume • Aiysha Wigley
Coach	Dylan Parsons
