= 2023 Super W season =

Australian women's rugby union season

- Countries: Australia (5 teams); Fiji (1 team)
- Tournament format(s): Round-robin and knockout
- Champions: Fijiana Drua (2nd title)
- Matches played: 18
- Official website: Super W

The 2023 Super W season was the sixth edition of the competition. The season kicked off on 24 March, with the final played on 6 May. In a historic first, defending champions, Fijiana Drua, got to play in front of their home crowd in Nadi against the Brumbies on 25 March.

The Fijiana Drua successfully defended their Super W title when they defeated the Queensland Reds in the grand final, the score was 38–30.

== Competition format ==
Each team will play each other once in a round-robin tournament over five rounds, both Semi-Finals is expected to be played at Concord Oval on 30 April in a doubleheader (Queensland Reds vs. New South Wales Waratahs) with the final to take place on 6 May in Townsville, North Queensland.

== Competition ==
=== Ladder ===
| Pos | Team | Pld | W | D | L | PF | PA | PD | TB | LB | Pts | Qualification |
|---|---|---|---|---|---|---|---|---|---|---|---|---|
| 1 | New South Wales Waratahs | 5 | 5 | 0 | 0 | 158 | 48 | +110 | 4 | 0 | 24 | Qualification for Semi-finals |
| 2 | Queensland Reds | 5 | 4 | 0 | 1 | 167 | 77 | +90 | 3 | 1 | 20 | Qualification for Semi-finals |
| 3 | ACT Brumbies | 5 | 2 | 0 | 3 | 105 | 106 | −1 | 1 | 1 | 10 | Qualification for Semi-finals |
| 4 | Fijiana Drua | 5 | 2 | 0 | 3 | 88 | 118 | −30 | 1 | 0 | 9 | Qualification for Semi-finals |
| 5 | Western Force | 5 | 2 | 0 | 3 | 77 | 132 | −55 | 0 | 0 | 8 | |
| 6 | Melbourne Rebels | 5 | 0 | 0 | 5 | 40 | 154 | −114 | 0 | 1 | 1 | |

Updated to match(es) played on 8 April 2023. Source: Super W

=== Regular season ===
==== Round 1 ====
24 March
16:05 AEDT (UTC+11)

| (1 BP) New South Wales Waratahs | 43–0 | Western Force |
| Try: Piper Duck (2) 7' c, 74' c Maya Stewart 11' m Katrina Barker 21' m Adiana Talakai 28' c Margot Vella 47' m Jade Sheridan 77' c Con: Ella Ryan (4/7) 9', 29', 76', 78' | Report | Cards: Ariana Hira-Herangi (yellow card) 70' to 80'; Destiny Maui (yellow card) 74' |

Sydney Football Stadium, Moore Park
Referee: Jessica Ling

25 March
11:35 FJT (UTC+12)

| Fijiana Drua | 12–7 | ACT Brumbies (1 BP) |
| Try: Lavenia Tinai 10' c Laisani Moceisawana 44' m Con: Lavenia Tinai (1/2) 11'; Cards: Vani Va'aga Arei (yellow card) 61' to 71' | Report | Try: Grace Kemp 53' c Con: Faitala Moleka (1/1) 54' |

Prince Charles Park, Nadi
Referee: George Myers

25 March
16:05 AEDT (UTC+11)

| Melbourne Rebels | 0–43 | Queensland Reds (1 BP) |
| Cards: Michaela Maunsell (yellow card) 15' to 25'; Tanya Yabaki (yellow card) 38' to 48'; Ashley Marsters (yellow card) 40' to 50'; Naila Faaiuaso (yellow card) 52' to 62'; Kerri Johnson (yellow card) 64' to 74' | Report | Try: Shannon Parry 5' m Cecilia Smith (2) 11' c, 34' c Renae Nona 15' m Tiarna Molloy 41' c Ellie Draper 49' m Alana Elisaia 66' c Con: Cecilia Smith (4/7) 12', 35', 41', 67' |

Melbourne Rectangular Stadium, Olympic Park
Referee: Tyler Miller

==== Round 2 ====
31 March
16:05 AEST (UTC+10)

| (1 BP) Queensland Reds | 29–14 | Western Force |
| Try: Ivania Wong (2) 5' c, 75' m Deni Ross 22' c Sam Curtis 54' m Shannon Parry 64' m Con: Cecilia Smith (2/5) 7', 23'; Cards: Theresa Soloai (yellow card) 42' to 52' | Report | Try: Rachel Laqeretabua 47' c Angel Schwencke 61' c Con: Nicole Ledington (2/2) 48', 61' |

Lang Park, Milton
Referee: Sarah Porter

1 April
11:05 FJT (UTC+12)

| (1 BP) Fijiana Drua | 39–12 | Melbourne Rebels |
| Try: Vitalina Naikore (2) 5' m, 11' m Ani Mei Likuvaqali 20' c Vani Va'aga Arei (2) 33' m, 48' m Adita Miliana 40' c Litia Marama 57' m Con: Vitalina Naikore (0/2); Lavenia Tinai (2/3) 21', 41'; Livia Naidei (0/1); Cards: Siteri Rasolea (yellow card) 68' to 78'; Karalaini Naisewa (yellow card) 80+1' | Report | Try: Laiema Bosenavulagi 61' m Mia-Rae Clifford 72' c Con: Harmony Vatau (0/1); Mia-Rae Clifford (1/1) 73' |

HFC Bank Stadium, Suva
Referee: Ella Goldsmith

1 April
16:05 AEDT (UTC+11)

| ACT Brumbies | 13–24 | New South Wales Waratahs (1 BP) |
| Try: Tania Naden 11' c Con: Ashlea Bishop (1/1) 12'; Pen: Ashlea Bishop (2/2) 41', 64' | Report | Try: Maya Stewart (2) 4' c, 55' m Ella Ryan 22' m Caitlyn Halse 75' c Con: Ella Ryan (1/2) 6'; Claudia Meltzer (1/2) 76' |

Canberra Stadium, Bruce
Referee: Jessica Ling

==== Round 3 ====
7 April
17:05 AEST (UTC+10)

| Queensland Reds | 20–10 | ACT Brumbies |
| Try: Briana Dascombe (2) 34' c, 46' c Con: Cecilia Smith (2/2) 35', 48'; Pen: Cecilia Smith (2/2) 27', 39' | Report | Try: Tabua Tuinakauvadra 31' c Con: Faitala Moleka (1/1) 33'; Pen: Faitala Moleka (1/1) 11' |

Lang Park, Milton
Referee: Jessica Ling

8 April
15:05 AEST (UTC+10)

| (1 BP) New South Wales Waratahs | 31–5 | Fijiana Drua |
| Try: Desiree Miller 8' m Layne Morgan (2) 11' c, 53' m Katalina Amosa 58' c Jade Sheridan 66' c Con: Ella Ryan (0/2); Desiree Miller (3/3) 12', 59', 67' | Report | Try: Lavenia Tinai 49' m Con: Vitalina Naikore (0/1) |

Concord Oval, Concord
Referee: Tyler Miller

8 April
17:05 AEST (UTC+10)

| Melbourne Rebels | 5–13 | Western Force |
| Try: Kerri Johnson 62' m Con: Mia-Rae Clifford (0/1); Pen: Mia-Rae Clifford (0/1) | Report | Try: Martha Mataele 33' m Hera-Barb Malcolm Heke 72' m Con: Nicole Ledington (0/2); Pen: Nicole Ledington (1/1) 31'; Cards: Hera-Barb Malcolm Heke (yellow card) 57' to 67' |

Melbourne Rectangular Stadium, Olympic Park
Referee: Natarsha Ganley

==== Round 4 ====
14 April
17:05 AEST (UTC+10)

| (1 BP) ACT Brumbies | 30–23 | Melbourne Rebels (1 BP) |
| Try: Tania Naden 6' m Lydia Kavoa 10' m Apryll Green 21' c Jasmin Huriwai 66' m Biola Dawa 77' m Con: Ashlea Bishop (1/3) 22'; Faitala Moleka (0/2); Pen: Faitala Moleka (1/1) 75' | Report | Try: Utumalefata To'omalatai Eli 37' c Faalua Tugaga 46' c Con: Mia-Rae Clifford (2/2) 38', 47'; Pen: Mia-Rae Clifford (3/3) 14', 24', 64'; Cards: Naila Faaiuaso (yellow card) 78'; Faalua Tugaga (yellow card) 78' |

Canberra Stadium, Bruce
Referee: Ella Goldsmith

16 April
15:05 AEST (UTC+10)

| New South Wales Waratahs | 31–30 | Queensland Reds (1 BP) |
| Try: Bridie O'Gorman 5' c Desiree Miller (2) 36' m, 48' m Georgina Friedrichs 43' c Adiana Talakai 61' c Con: Desiree Miller (3/5) 6', 45', 62' | Report | Try: Carys Dallinger 8' c Sam Curtis 26' c Annabelle Codey (2) 53' m, 78' m Con: Cecilia Smith (2/4) 9', 27'; Pen: Cecilia Smith (2/2) 32', 73' |

Concord Oval, Concord
Referee: George Myers

16 April
17:05 AEST (UTC+8)

| Western Force | 23–10 | Fijiana Drua |
| Try: Leah Miles 19' m Martha Mataele 27' m Libya Teepa 58' c Con: Nicole Ledington (1/3) 59'; Pen: Nicole Ledington (2/2) 53', 81' | Report | Try: Lavenia Tinai (2) 9' m, 31' m Con: Lavenia Tinai (0/2); Cards: Nunia Uluilakeba (yellow card) 17' to 27', (red card) 34'; Keleni Marawa (yellow card) 62' to 72' |

UWA Sports Park, Mount Claremont
Referee: Jordan Kaminski

==== Round 5 ====
21 April
17:05 AEST (UTC+10)

| Melbourne Rebels | 0–29 | New South Wales Waratahs (1 BP) |
| Cards: Laiema Bosenavulagi (yellow card) 50' to 60' | Report | Try: Katalina Amosa 6' c Grace Hamilton 11' m Jacinta Windsor 38' c Iliseva Batibasaga 74' m Maya Stewart 78' m Con: Desiree Miller (2/5) 7', 39' |

Melbourne Rectangular Stadium, Olympic Park
Referee: Sarah Porter

22 April
17:05 AEST (UTC+8)

| Western Force | 27–45 | ACT Brumbies |
| Try: Angel Schwencke 25' c Trilleen Pomare 52' m Lynn Koelman 59' m Martha Mataele (2) 64' m, 81' m Con: Nicole Ledington (1/5) 26' | Report | Try: Siokapesi Palu 0' c Biola Dawa 1' c Jasmin Huriwai (2) 1' c, 21' c Faitala Moleka 13' c Kate Holland 43' c Con: Faitala Moleka (6/6) 0', 1', 1', 14', 22', 44'; Pen: Faitala Moleka (1/1) 79'; Cards: Iris Verebalavu (yellow card) 28' to 38' |

Perth Rectangular Stadium, Perth
Referee: Tyler Miller

23 April
13:05 AEST (UTC+10)

| (1 BP) Queensland Reds | 45–22 | Fijiana Drua |
| Try: Carola Kreis 1' m Haidee Head 32' c Alana Elisaia 36' c Shannon Parry 46' c Cecilia Smith 48' m Heleina Young 51' c Ellie Draper 74' c Con: Cecilia Smith (5/7) 33', 37', 46', 53', 75' | Report | Try: Siteri Rasolea 18' c Litia Marama 20' c Merewai Cumu 43' c Vani Va'aga Arei 60' c Con: Livia Naidei (1/1) 19'; Merevesi Ofakimalino (0/2); Wainikiti Vosadrau (0/1); Cards: Bitila Tawake (yellow card) 25' to 35'; Joma Rubuti (yellow card) 46' to 56' |

Toowong Memorial Park, Toowong
Referee: Ella Goldsmith

=== Finals ===
==== Bracket ====
Semi-finals
30 April – Concord Oval
New South Wales Waratahs | 17
Fijiana Drua | 20
30 April – Concord Oval
Queensland Reds | 23
ACT Brumbies | 20

Final
6 May – North Queensland Stadium
Fijiana Drua | 38
Queensland Reds | 30

==== Semi-finals ====
30 April
13:05 AEST UTC+10

| New South Wales Waratahs | 17–20 | Fijiana Drua |
| Try: Desiree Miller 1'; Maya Stewart 4'; Adiana Talakai 19'; Con: Desiree Miller 5' | Report | Try: Siteri Rasolea 22'; Vani Va'aga Arei 25', 69'; Con: Luisa Tisolo 23'; Pen: Luisa Tisolo 42' |

Concord Oval, Concord
Referee: Amber McLachlan

30 April
15:05 AEST UTC+10

| Queensland Reds | 23–20 | ACT Brumbies |
| Try: Renae Nona 16'; Heleina Young 44', 47'; Con: Cecilia Smith 45'; Pen: Carys Dallinger 70', 78' | Report | Try: Tania Naden 7', 11'; Grace Kemp 55'; Con: Faitala Moleka 13'; Pen: Faitala Moleka 76' |

Concord Oval, Concord
Referee: Tyler Miller

==== Final ====
6 May
16:45 AEST UTC+10

| Queensland Reds | 30–38 | Fijiana Drua |
| Try: Alana Elisaia 3' c Renae Nona 44' c Tiarna Molloy 64' m Sam Curtis 79' m Con: Cecilia Smith (2) 5', 45'; Pen: Cecilia Smith (2) 36', 71' | Report | Try: Bitila Tawake 7' c Mereoni Nakesa 12' c Sereima Leweniqila 48' c Adita Miliana 50' c Karalaini Naisewa 59' c Con: Luisa Tisolo (5) 8', 13', 49', 51', 60'; Pen: Luisa Tisolo 57'; Cards: Bitila Tawake (yellow card) 74' to 80'; Laisana Moceisawana (yellow card) 75' to 80' |

North Queensland Stadium, Townsville
Referee: Amber McLachlan
