= 2022 Super W season =

Australian women's rugby union season

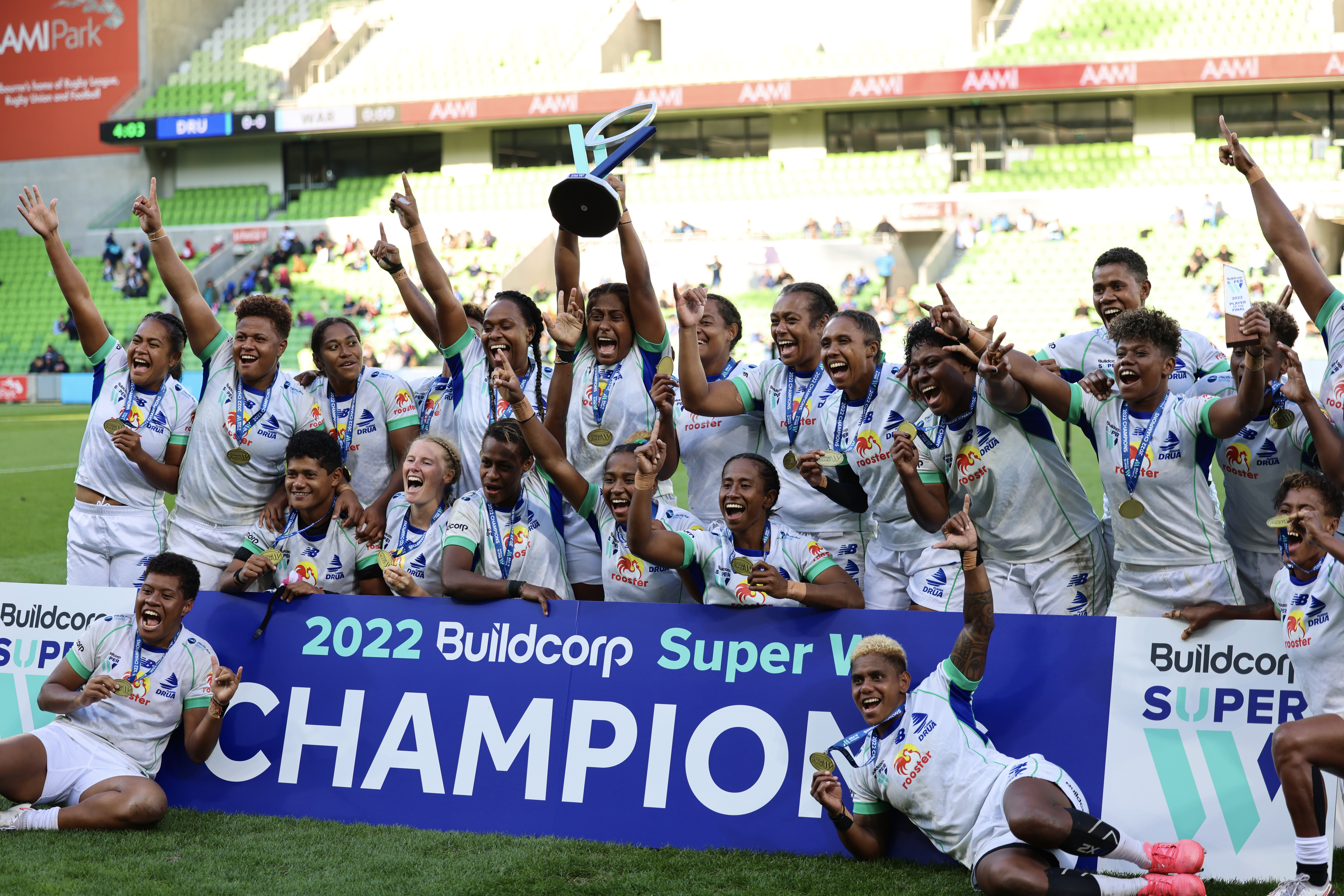
- The Fijiana celebrating their victory in the final
- Countries: Australia (5 teams); Fiji (1 team)
- Tournament format(s): Round-robin and knockout
- Champions: Fijiana Drua (1st title)
- Matches played: 17
- Tries scored: 122 (7.18 per match)
- Official website: Official site

The 2022 Super W season was the fifth edition of the Super W competition. The Fijiana Drua joined the five Super W teams for the 2022 season, and won the championship. The New South Wales Waratahs were the four-time, back-to-back defending champions.

== Competition format ==
With six teams, each team played five regular season matches. The top three teams at the end of the regular season progressed to the finals. The second and third placed teams competed in a semi-final elimination round on 14 April. The winner progressed to the Grand Final on 24 April and played the first placed team for the championship.

== Competition ==
=== Ladder ===
Pos	Team	Pld	W	D	L	PF	PA	PD	TB	LB	Pts	Qualification
1	Fijiana Drua (C)	5	5	0	0	184	51	+133	4	0	24	Qualification for Final
2	New South Wales Waratahs	5	4	0	1	185	70	+115	4	0	20	Qualification for Semi-final
3	Queensland Reds	5	3	0	2	125	95	+30	2	0	14	Qualification for Semi-final
4	ACT Brumbies	5	1	1	3	78	99	−21	1	1	8	
5	Melbourne Rebels	4	0	1	3	37	205	−168	0	0	2	
6	Western Force	4	0	0	4	57	146	−89	0	0	0	

Updated to match(es) played on 9 April 2022. Source: Super W
(C) Champions

=== Regular season ===
==== Round 1 ====
4 March	Western Force	7–43	Queensland Reds (1 BP)	Perth Oval
AWST (UTC+8) 16:35	Try: Tui Cope 61' c Con: Kendra Fell (1/1) 62'	Report	Try: Caitlin Costello 16' m Skyla Adams 33' c Ellie Draper 41' c Ivania Wong 45' m Shannon Parry 54' c Imogen Hei 72' c Hana Lane 75' m Con: Melanie Wilks (4/7) 34', 42', 55', 73'	Referee: Tyler Miller

5 March	Melbourne Rebels	5–66	Fijiana Drua (1 BP)	Endeavour Hills RC
AEDT 16:30 (UTC+11)	Try: Nawel Remini 76' m Con: Georgia Cormick (0/1)	Report	Try: Jiowana Sauto 8' c Vika Matarugu 21' c Roela Radiniyavuni (3) 26' c, 40' c, 73' m Karalaini Naisewa 28' c Kolora Lomani (2) 45' m, 48' c Melaia Matanatabu 51' c Vitalina Naikore 70' c Con: Merewalesi Rokouono (8/10) 10', 21', 27', 29', 41', 49', 52', 71'	Referee: David Conway

5 March	Brumbies	17–31	New South Wales Waratahs (1 BP)	Canberra Stadium
AWST 16:15 (UTC+8)	Try: Jemima McCalman (2) 15' c, 74' c Con: Ashleigh Hewson (2/2) 16', 75'; Pen: Ashleigh Hewson 25'	Report	Try: Emily Chancellor 34' c Piper Duck 45' c Mahalia Murphy (3) 50' m, 55' c, 70' m Con: Lori Cramer (3/5) 36', 46', 57'	Referee: Max Fulton

==== Round 2 ====
11 March	Melbourne Rebels	17–17	Brumbies	Melbourne Rectangular Stadium
AEDT 16:05 (UTC+11)	Try: Michaela Maunsell 41' m Ashley Marsters 65' m Eirenei Nanai 81' c Con: Georgia Cormick (1/3) 82'	Report	Try: Rebecca Smyth 27' m Jemima McCalman 54' c Biola Dawa 70' m Con: Teliya Hetaraka (1/3) 56'	Referee: Rory Crombie

12 March	Queensland Reds	12–27	Fijiana Drua (1 BP)	Lang Park
AEST 16:00 (UTC+10)	Try: Ivania Wong 11' m Ellie Draper 76' c Con: Cecilia Smith (1/2) 77'	Report	Try: Doreen Narokete 24' c Vitalina Naikore (2) 28' m, 52' m Jade Coates 42' m Vika Matarugu 60' m Con: Merewalesi Rokouono (1/5) 25'	Referee: David Conway

13 March	(1 BP) New South Wales Waratahs	31–14	Western Force	Leichhardt Oval
AEDT 15:15 (UTC+11)	Try: Mahalia Murphy 1' c Margot Vella 15' c Georgina Tuipulotu 63' m Bridie O'Gorman 66' m Faliki Pohiva 80' c Con: Pauline Piliae (3/5) 2', 16', 81'	Report	Try: Ariana Hira 5' c Raewyn Tuheke 42' c Con: Nicole Ledington (2/2) 7', 43'	Referee: Jessica Ling

==== Round 3 ====
18 March	(1 BP) Brumbies	10–15	Queensland Reds	Canberra Stadium
AEDT 16:05 (UTC+11)	Try: Rebecca Smyth 21' c Con: Ashleigh Hewson (1/1) 22'; Pen: Ashleigh Hewson 35'	Report	Try: Liz Patu (2) 29' m, 71' m Madi Schuck 50' m	Referee: Amber McLachlan

19 March	(1 BP) Fijiana Drua	45–17	Western Force	Leichhardt Oval
AEDT 10:50 (UTC+11)	Try: Vika Matarugu 5' m Teresia Tinanivalu (2) 14' c, 36' c Raijieli Laqeretabua 22' c Vitalina Naikore 24' m Kolora Lomani 31' c Timaima Ravisa 39' c Con: Merewalesi Rokouono (5/7) 15', 23', 32', 37', 39'	Report	Try: Zakiya Kereopa 46' m Rebecca Clough 53' m Huia Swannell 76' c Con: Trilleen Pomare (1/3) 77'	Referee: Max Fulton

19 March	(1 BP) New South Wales Waratahs	67–10	Melbourne Rebels	Sydney Cricket Ground
AEDT 16:05 (UTC+11)	Try: Mahalia Murphy (5) 4' c, 22' m, 29' m, 71' m, 82' c Lori Cramer (2) 13' m, 77' c Margot Vella 41' c Eva Karpani 43' m Georgie Friedrichs 55' c Penelope Leiataua 68' c Con: Pauline Piliae (6/11) 5', 42', 56', 69', 78', 83'	Report	Try: Janita Kareta (2) 19' m, 62' m Con: Georgia Cormick (0/1); Claire Ryan (0/1)	Referee: Jessica Ling

==== Round 4 ====
Bye round

==== Round 5 ====
1 April	(1 BP) Fijiana Drua	29–10	New South Wales Waratahs	Robina Stadium
AEDT 10:00 (UTC+11)	Try: Vitalina Naikore 6' m Kolora Lomani 9' m Timaima Ravisa 15' c Raijieli Laqeretabua 47' c Akosita Ravato 77' m Con: Merewalesi Rokouono (1/4) 16'; Vitalina Naikore (1/1) 48'	Report	Try: Lori Cramer 18' m Tatum Bird 75' m Con: Lori Cramer (0/2)	Referee: Amber McLachlan

2 April	(1 BP) Queensland Reds	55–5	Melbourne Rebels	Lang Park
AEST 16:15 (UTC+10)	Try: Renae Nona 19' c Liz Patu (2) 27' m, 58' c Ivania Wong (3) 33' c, 49' m, 77' m Ellie Draper 43' c Aleena Greenhalgh 65' m Annabelle Codey 74' c Con: Cecilia Smith (5/5) 20', 34', 44', 60', 75'; Melanie Wilks (0/4); Cards: Aleena Greenhalgh (yellow card) 38' to 48'	Report	Try: Willow Rowland 9' m Con: Georgia Cormick (0/1); Cards: Hope Schuster (yellow card) 39' to 49'	Referee: Rory Crombie

3 April	(1 BP) Brumbies	27–19	Western Force	Viking Park
AEST 14:00 (UTC+10)	Try: Penalty try 9' m Grace Kemp 39' m Rebecca Smyth 44' m Halley Derera 73' c Con: Ashleigh Hewson (1/3) 75'; Pen: Ashleigh Hewson (1/1) 36'	Report	Try: Turiti-Kapuarei Galiki 31' c Zakiya Kereopa 56' m Madeline Putz 77' c Con: Nicole Ledington (1/2) 32', 77'	Referee: Tyler Miller

==== Round 6 ====
8 April	Western Force	Cancelled (Note: The Round 6 match between the Western Force and the Melbourne Rebels was cancelled due to the COVID-19 pandemic.)	Melbourne Rebels	Perth Oval
AWST 9:45 (UTC+8)		Report

9 April	(1 BP) New South Wales Waratahs	46–0	Queensland Reds	Eric Tweedale Oval
AEST 16:15 (UTC+10)	Try: Georgie Friedrichs 4' m Natalie Delamere (2) 14' m, 24' c Iliseva Batibasaga 23' m Sera Naiqama 43' m Piper Duck 48' c Margot Vella (2) 68' m, 75' c Con: Arabella McKenzie (2/6) 35', 49'; Pauline Piliae (1/2) 76'	Report		Referee: Amber McLachlan

9 April	Fijiana Drua	17–7	Brumbies	Lang Park
AEST 17:15 (UTC+10)	Try: Joma Rubuti 17' m Rusila Tamoi 52' c Roela Radiniyavuni 72'; Con: Merewalesi Rokouono (0/1); Vitalina Naikore (1/2) 53'	Report	Try: Jasmin Huriwai 66' c Con: Ella Ryan (1/1) 67'; Cards: Rebecca Smyth (yellow card) 29' to 39'; Ashleigh Hewson (yellow card) 51' to 61'	Referee: Tyler Miller

=== Finals ===
==== Bracket ====
Semi-final
14 April – Eric Tweedale Oval
New South Wales Waratahs	36
Queensland Reds	0

Final
23 April – Melbourne Rec. Stadium
Fijiana Drua	32
New South Wales Waratahs	26

==== Semi-final ====
14 April	New South Wales Waratahs	36–0	Queensland Reds	Eric Tweedale Oval
AEST 18:00 (UTC+10)	Try: Grace Hamilton 27' m Mahalia Murphy 31' c Tatum Bird 38' m Natalie Delamere 41' m Margot Vella 66' c Kaitlan Leaney 79' c Con: Arabella McKenzie (1/3) 33'; Lori Cramer (2/3) 67', 81'	Report		Referee: Amber McLachlan

==== Final ====
23 April	Fijiana Drua	32–26	New South Wales Waratahs	Melbourne Rectangular Stadium
AEST 14:00 (UTC+11)		Report
