= 2022 Oceania Rugby Women's Championship =

2022 Oceania Women's Championship
Tournament details
- Host: New Zealand
- Venue: Auckland
- Date: 9 July 2022– 18 July 2022
- Teams: 4

Final positions
- Champions: Fiji (3rd title)
- Runner-up: Samoa

Tournament statistics
- Matches played: 6
- Tries scored: 72 (12 per match)
- Top scorer(s): (Fiji) Vitalina Naikore (45 points)
- Most tries: (Tonga) Mele Hufanga (7)

The 2022 Oceania Rugby Women's Championship is the fourth edition of the Oceania Rugby Women's Championship. The competition will be held in Papakura and Pukekohe in New Zealand from 9 to 18 July. The tournament returns for the first time since 2019. It will be the first time that Papua New Guinea, Samoa and Tonga will play since 2020 and will provide Fiji with valuable preparation ahead of the 2021 Rugby World Cup.

The tournament will be played over three rounds at Massey Park and the Navigation Homes Stadium.

Fiji won their third championship title after beating Samoa 31–24 in a hard-fought match.

== Teams ==
Four women's teams will compete in the tournament. Papua New Guinea, Samoa and Tonga last played a test match in 2020.

- Fiji
- Papua New Guinea
- Samoa
- Tonga

== Format ==
The tournament will be played in a round-robin format over the course of nine days.

== Table ==
Pos	Team	P	W	D	L	PF	PA	PD
1	Fiji	3	3	0	0	217	31	186
2	Samoa	3	2	0	1	140	24	116
3	Tonga	3	1	0	2	132	66	66
4	Papua New Guinea	3	0	0	3	7	351	-344

== Tournament ==
=== Round 1 ===
Test: 1485	9 July	Samoa	25–17	Tonga	Massey Park
	13:00 NZST (UTC+12:00)	Try: Atonio (2); Curry; Bloomfield; Con: Siataga; Pen: Siataga		Try: Hufanga (2); Hala; Con: Toa	Referee: (New Zealand) Larissa Woolerton

Samoa

Tonga

FB	15	Elesi Leiataua
RW	14	Michelle Curry
OC	13	Utumalama Atonio
IC	12	Bernadette Robertson
LW	11	Sailiai Pau
FH	10	Cassie Siataga
SH	9	France Bloomfield
N8	8	Nina Foaese
OF	7	Masuisuimatama'ali'i Tauaua-Pauaraisa (c)
BF	6	Ti Tauasosi
RL	5	Lesa Kaleti
LL	4	Easter Savelio
TP	3	Penina Tuilaepa
HK	2	Wynona Baice
LP	1	Angelica Uila
Replacements:
HK	16	Paige Misky
PR	17	Kayla Clark
PR	18	Octavia Nanai'iafeta
LK	19	Olalini Tafoulua
FL	20	Alyce Solaese
SH	21	Makayla Eli
FH	22	Elianna Suluvale
FB	23	Vi'i Fanene
Coach:
(Samoa) Ramsey Tomokino

FB	15	Loketi Serenity Mahoni
RW	14	Siutiti Vea Ma'ake
OC	13	Mele Makineti Hufanga (c)
IC	12	Malia Kalemeli Tova
LW	11	Taina Halasima
FH	10	Shonte Toa
SH	9	Lu’isa Sikata Pita
N8	8	Mafi Kovi Anne Marie Faukafa
OF	7	Shirley Lisa-Netti Mailangi
BF	6	Emma Hopoi
RL	5	Ayla Cook
LL	4	Siale Fisi’iakau ‘Alatini
TP	3	Amania Vasiti Mafi
HK	2	Vainga Lesieli Moimoi
LP	1	Asipau Mafi
Replacements:
HK	16	Siunipa Lesieli Pahulu
PR	17	Tilila Leilani Hifo
PR	18	Sokopeti Jessica Akauola
LK	19	Ruby Tangulu
N8	20	Tonga Leilani Tuiaki
SH	21	Kasa Tupou
CE	22	Simaima Fale Ki He Toa Hala
CE	23	Fakanonoa Maumu’a
Coach:

Test: 1486	9 July	Fiji	152–0	Papua New Guinea	Massey Park
	15:30 NZST (UTC+12:00)	Try: Delaiwau (4); Lomani (3); Wilson (2); Naikore (2); Coates; Laqeretabua; Matarugu; Milina; Nabura; Ofakimalino; Rokouono; Rubuti; Senikarivi; Tagabale; Vasuturaga; Vonosere; Waisega; Con: Naikore (8); Vosadrau (7); Rokouono			Referee: (Samoa) Avi'i Fa'alupega

Fiji

Papua New Guinea

FB	15	Talei Wilson
RW	14	Adita Milina
OC	13	Raijieli Laqeretabua
IC	12	Vitalina Naikore
LW	11	Ilisapeci Delaiwau
FH	10	Merewalesi Rokouono
SH	9	Evivi Senikarivi
N8	8	Bitila Tawake (c)
OF	7	Ema Masi
BF	6	Sulita Waisega
RL	5	Merevesi Ofakimalino
LL	4	Jade Coates
TP	3	Mereoni Vonosere
HK	2	Vika Matarugu
LP	1	Joma Rubuti
Replacements:
HK	16	Litia Marama
PR	17	Miriama Kunagale
PR	18	Bulou Vasuturaga
LK	19	Karavaki Lutumaibau
FL	20	Fulori Nabura
SH	21	Kolora Lomani
FH	22	Wainikiti Vosadrau
FB	23	Unaisi Tagabale
Coach:
(Fiji) Senirusi Seruvakula

FB	15	Gwen Pokana
RW	14	Celllia Taubuso
OC	13	Jesicca Refrika
IC	12	Juliane Yallon
LW	11	Melissa Maino
FH	10	Salimata Olewale
SH	9	Darlene Aihi
N8	8	Janina Nightingale
OF	7	Lynette Davani
BF	6	Doris Joseph
RL	5	Bibiana Paloa
LL	4	Shelane Kopi
TP	3	Carol Paua
HK	2	Lorraine Pomat
LP	1	Vagikune Wari
Replacements:
HK	16	Emma Okswata
PR	17	Jane Buku
PR	18	Isi Govea
LK	19	Isabella Grant
N8	20	Alumintha Kiwa
SH	21	Daisy John
CE	22	Lyanne Nilmo
CE	23	Lorraine Pomat
Coach:
(Papua New Guinea) Cecil Davani

=== Round 2 ===
Test: 1487	13 July	Samoa	91–0	Papua New Guinea	Navigation Homes Stadium
	17:00 NZST (UTC+12:00)	Try: Eli (3); Fiafia (3); Atonio (2); Suluvale (2); Fanene; Leaula; Robertson; Tauasosi; Tuilaepa; Con: Siataga (5); Eli (3)			Referee: (Samoa) Avi'i Fa'alupega

Samoa

Papua New Guinea

FB	15	Makayla Eli
RW	14	Elianna Suluvale
OC	13	Vi'i Fanene
IC	12	Bernadette Robertson
LW	11	Linda Fiafia
FH	10	Cassie Siataga
SH	9	Saelua Leaula
N8	8	Ti Tauasosi
OF	7	Masuisuimatama'ali'i Tauaua-Pauaraisa (c)
BF	6	Alyce Solaese
RL	5	Lesa Kaleti
LL	4	Olalini Tafoulua
TP	3	Angelica Uila
HK	2	Paige Misky
LP	1	Octavia Nanai'iafeta
Replacements:
HK	16	Penina Tuilaepa
PR	17	Kayla Clark
PR	18	Alexandria Seevae Peni
LK	19	Tiana Granby
FL	20	Barbara Auva'a
SH	21	Esther Savelio
FH	22	Michelle Curry
FB	23	Utumalama Atonio
Coach:
(Samoa) Ramsey Tomokino

FB	15	Gwen Pokana
RW	14	Celllia Taubuso
OC	13	Jesicca Refireka
IC	12	Daisy John
LW	11	Alumintha Kiwa
FH	10	Salimata Olewale
SH	9	Darlene Aihi
N8	8	Bibiana Paloa (c)
OF	7	Janina Nightingale
BF	6	Lynette Davani
RL	5	Isi Govea
LL	4	Shelane Kopi
TP	3	Carol Paua
HK	2	Jane Buku
LP	1	Vagikune Wari
Replacements:
HK	16	Emma Oskwata
PR	17	Lorraine Pomat
PR	18	Lyan Philemon
LK	19	Clarah Biyama
N8	20	Doris Joseph
SH	21	Heiga Apia
CE	22	Melissa Maino
CE	23	Isbella Grant
Coach:
(Papua New Guinea) Cecil Davani

Test: 1488	13 July	Fiji	34–7	Tonga	Navigation Homes Stadium
	19:30 NZST (UTC+12:00)	Try: Naikore (3); Arei; Delaiwau; Tawake; Con: Naikore; Milina		Try: Hufanga; Con: Toa	Referee: (New Zealand) Larissa Woolerton

Fiji

Tonga

FB	15	Kolora Lomani
RW	14	Ilisapeci Delaiwau
OC	13	Vani Arei
IC	12	Raijieli Laqeretabua
LW	11	Vitalina Naikore
FH	10	Merewalesi Rokouono
SH	9	Evivi Senikarivi
N8	8	Bitila Tawake (c)
OF	7	Ema Masi
BF	6	Sulita Waisega
RL	5	Jade Coates
LL	4	Merevesi Ofakimalino
TP	3	Mereoni Vonosere
HK	2	Vika Matarugu
LP	1	Joma Rubuti
Replacements:
HK	16	Litia Marama
PR	17	Bulou Vasuturaga
PR	18	Miriama Kunagale
LK	19	Akosita Ravato
FL	20	Fulori Nabura
SH	21	Talei Kidd
FH	22	Wainikiti Vosadrau
FB	23	Adita Milina
Coach:
(Fiji) Senirusi Seruvakula

FB	15	Kasa Tupou
RW	14	Fakanonoa Manumu’a
OC	13	Mele Makineti Hufanga (c)
IC	12	Simaima Hala
LW	11	Siutiti Ma’ake
FH	10	Malia Kalemeli Tova
SH	9	Lu’isa Sikata Pita
N8	8	Mafi Kovi Anne Marie Faukafa
OF	7	Shirley Lisa-Netti Mailangi
BF	6	Emma Hopoi
RL	5	Ayla Cook
LL	4	Siale Fisi’iakau ‘Alatini
TP	3	Tilila Leilani Hifo
HK	2	Siunipa Lesieli Pahulu
LP	1	Va’inga Moimoi
Replacements:
HK	16	Asipau Mafi
PR	17	Amania Vasiti Mafi
PR	18	Sokopeti Jessica Akauola
LK	19	Ruby Tangulu
N8	20	Luseane Popua Pepa
SH	21	Tonga Leilani Tuiaki
CE	22	Haisini Teu
CE	23	Florence Hakalo
Coach:

=== Round 3 ===
Test: 1489	18 July	Tonga	108–7	Papua New Guinea	Massey Park
	13:00 NZST (UTC+12:00)	Try: Hufanga (4) ‘Akau’ola (3); Ma’ake (2); Mahoni (2); Manumu’a (2); Faukafa; Hifo; Hopoi; Pita; Tova; Con: Tova (9)		Try: Paloa; Con: Aihi	Referee: (Samoa) Avi'i Fa'alupega

Tonga

Papua New Guinea

FB	15	Loketi Serenity Mahoni
RW	14	Fakanonoa Manumu’a
OC	13	Mele Makineti Hufanga (c)
IC	12	Simaima Hala
LW	11	Siutiti Ma’ake
FH	10	Malia Kalemeli Tova
SH	9	Lu’isa Sikata Pita
N8	8	Mafi Kovi Anne Marie Faukafa
OF	7	Shirley Lisa-Netti Mailangi
BF	6	Emma Hopoi
RL	5	Sokopeti ‘Akau’ola
LL	4	Siale Fisi’iakau ‘Alatini
TP	3	Amania Vasiti Mafi
HK	2	Va’inga Moimoi
LP	1	Asipau Mafi
Replacements:
HK	16	Siunipa Pahulu
PR	17	Tilila Hifo
PR	18	Ayla Cook
LK	19	Ruby Tangulu
FL	20	Luseane Popua Pepa
SH	21	Tonga Leilani Tuiaki
FH	22	Haisini Teu
FB	23	Florence Hakalo
Coach:

FB	15	Gwen Pokana
RW	14	Cellia Taubuso
OC	13	Jesicca Refireka
IC	12	Julianne Yallon (c)
LW	11	Heiga Apia
FH	10	Darlene Aihi
SH	9	Celestine Kabilu
N8	8	Jeninah Nightingale
OF	7	Jemimah Tovok
BF	6	Lynette Davani
RL	5	Bibiana Paloa (c)
LL	4	Shelane Kopi
TP	3	Emma Oskwata
HK	2	Jane Buku
LP	1	Vagikune Wari
Replacements:
HK	16	Lyan Philemon
PR	17	Naomi Alapi
PR	18	Carol Paua
LK	19	Isi Govea
N8	20	Isabella Grant
SH	21	Daisy John
CE	22	Melissa Maino
CE	23	Doris Joseph
Coach:
(Papua New Guinea) Cecil Davani

Test: 1490	18 July	Fiji	31–24	Samoa	Massey Park
	15:30 NZST (UTC+12:00)	Try: Delaiwau; Laqeretabua; Mirini; Ravato; Vonosere; Con: Naikore; Rokouono; Vosadrau		Try: Curry; Fiafia; Con: Siataga; Pen: Siataga (4)	Referee: (New Zealand) Larissa Woolerton

Fiji

Samoa

FB	15	Talei Wilson
RW	14	Ilisapeci Delaiwau
OC	13	Vani Arei
IC	12	Raijieli Laqeretabua
LW	11	Vitalina Naikore
FH	10	Merewalesi Rokouono
SH	9	Rosi Lomani
N8	8	Bitila Tawake (c)
OF	7	Akosita Ravato
BF	6	Fulori Nabura
RL	5	Sulita Waisega
LL	4	Asinate Serevi
TP	3	Mereoni Vonosere
HK	2	Vika Matarugu
LP	1	Joma Rubuti
Replacements:
HK	16	Litia Marama
PR	17	Bulou Vasuturaga
PR	18	Miriama Kunagale
LK	19	Jade Coates
FL	20	Vitalina Mirini
SH	21	Evivi Senikarivi
FH	22	Wainikiti Vosadrau
FB	23	Unaisi Tagabale
Coach:
(Fiji) Senirusi Seruvakula

FB	15	Makayla Eli
RW	14	Michelle Curry
OC	13	Utumalama Atonio
IC	12	Bernadette Robertson
LW	11	Linda Fiafia
FH	10	Cassie Siataga
SH	9	Saelua Leaula
N8	8	Nina Foaese
OF	7	Masuisuimatama'ali'i Tauaua-Pauaraisa (c)
BF	6	Ti Tauasosi
RL	5	Easter Savelio
LL	4	Lesa Kaleti
TP	3	Penina Tuilaepa
HK	2	Paige Misky
LP	1	Angelica Uila
Replacements:
HK	16	Kayla Clark
PR	17	Octavia Nanai-Iafeta
PR	18	Alexandria Seevae Peni
LK	19	Olalini Tafoulua
N8	20	Alyce Solaese
SH	21	France Bloomfield
CE	22	Elianna Suluvale
CE	23	Vi'i Fanene
Coach:
(Samoa) Ramsey Tomokino
