= Talei Wilson =

Fiji international rugby union player

- Born: September 3, 1995 (age 31)
- Height: 1.64 m (5 ft 5 in)

Rugby union career
- Position(s): Centre, Wing, Loose forward
Super Rugby
Years	Team	Apps	(Points)
2018–Present	Brumbies	15	(15)
International career
Years	Team	Apps	(Points)
2022	Fiji	4	(15)
National sevens team
Years	Team		Comps
- Fiji 7s

Talei Qalo Wilson (born Sep 3, 1995) is a Fijian rugby union player. She plays for the Brumbies in the Super W competition.

== Rugby career ==
Wilson began playing rugby at the age of seven in 2003.

In the 2021 Super W season, she scored a try in the Brumbies opener against the Melbourne Rebels.

Wilson switched from playing Wing to Blindside Flanker in the Brumbies opening game against the Waratahs in the 2022 Super W season. She played against the Fijiana Drua in the final round of competition.

Wilson was selected for the Fijiana squad to play two test matches against Japan and Australia in May 2022. She made her international debut for Fiji against Japan on 1 May 2022 at Bond University at Gold Coast, Queensland. She went on to score her first try in a test match against Australia.

Wilson named in Fijiana squad again for the 2022 Oceania Championship in New Zealand. She scored a brace of tries as Fiji annihilated Papua New Guinea with a record 152–0. She was named in the starting line up in the final match against Samoa.

In September 2022, she was selected for the Fijiana squad to the 2021 Rugby World Cup in New Zealand.

She represented Fiji at the 2024 Summer Olympics in Paris. She scored a try in Fiji's 21–15 loss to South Africa for eleventh place.
