= Alana Elisaia =

- Born: 26 April 1996 (age 30)
- School: Cleveland State High School

Rugby union career
- Position: Centre
Super Rugby
Years	Team	Apps	(Points)
2018–	Queensland Reds		(0)
International career
Years	Team	Apps	(Points)
2019–	Australia	2	(0)

Alana Elisaia (born 26 April 1996) is an Australian rugby union player. She plays for the Wallaroos at international level and for the Queensland Reds in the Super W competition.

== Rugby career ==
=== 2018–22 ===
In 2018, Elisaia was part of the Queensland Reds inaugural squad for the first season of the Super W competition. She scored a try for the Reds in the 2019 Super W season grand final, however, it wasn't enough to stop the NSW Waratahs Women from winning their second title.

Elisaia made her test debut for Australia against the Black Ferns in 2019. In 2022, she was the inaugural recipient of the Selena Worsley Medal; it was awarded to the Women's player of the year at the Queensland Premier Rugby Final breakfast.

=== 2023 ===
On 6 May, she started for the Queensland Reds in their grand final against the Fijiana Drua, her side were beaten 30–38 as the Drua claimed their second title. She returned for the Wallaroos test against Fiji on 20 May at the Allianz Stadium.
