= Sereima Leweniqila =

Fiji international rugby union player (born 1990)

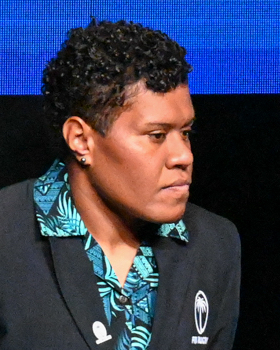
- Leweniqila in 2022
- Born: 5 May 1990 (age 36)

Rugby union career
- Position: Loose forward
Senior career
Years	Team	Apps	(Points)
2022	Fijiana Drua	6	(0)
International career
Years	Team	Apps	(Points)
2016–Present	Fiji	8	(0)
National sevens team
Years	Team		Comps
- Fiji

Sereima Leweniqila (born 5 May 1990) is a Fijian rugby union player. She captained Fiji at the delayed 2021 Rugby World Cup in New Zealand.

== Early life ==
Leweniqila hails from Nabouno, Udu, and Macuata. She also has maternal links to Namara, and Kadavu.

== Rugby career ==
=== 2017 ===
Leweniqila represented Fiji at the 2017 World Cup Asia/Oceania Qualifier in Hong Kong.

=== 2022 ===
Leweniqila was named as captain of the Fijiana Drua squad in their inaugural 2022 Super W season. She started in their debut match against the Rebels. She then faced the Reds in the second round of the competition. She also featured in their 45–17 victory over the Western Force. She next captained the team as they ended the Waratahs 20 game winning streak.

The Drua defeated the Brumbies 17–7 in the final round and booked themselves a spot in the Grand Final. The captaincy was given to Bitila Tawake as the Drua met the Waratahs again in the Grand Final. Despite a last minute comeback from the Waratahs, the Drua held on to win a thrilling Grand Final.

In May 2022, Leweniqila was selected for the Fijiana squad for two test matches against Australia and Japan. She played in the first test against Japan. She also played in the second test against Australia, it was the first meeting between the two sides.

In September 2022, She played in a warm up match against Canada. She was named as captain of the Fijiana team for the 2021 Rugby World Cup.

=== 2023 ===
Leweniqila led the Fijiana's in their second test against the Wallaroos on 20 May at the Allianz Stadium, her side were defeated 22–5.
