= Jade Coates =

Fiji international rugby union player

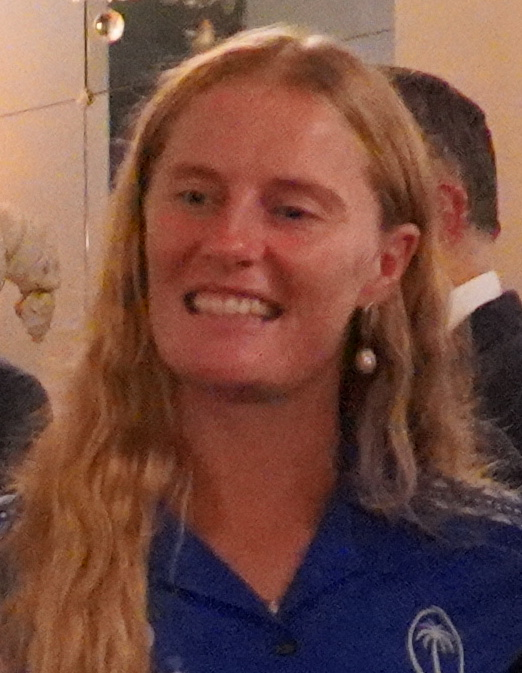
- Coates at the UK Embassy in the US, July 2025
- Born: 7 September 1998 (age 28)
- Height: 179 cm (5 ft 10 in)
- Weight: 75 kg (165 lb; 11 st 11 lb)
- Notable relative(s): Brittany Coates (sister); Seta Tamanivalu (brother-in-law)

Rugby union career
- Position: Lock
Provincial / State sides
Years	Team	Apps	(Points)
2023–	Waikato	16	(0)
Super Rugby
Years	Team	Apps	(Points)
2022–2024	Fijiana Drua		(0)
2025–	Chiefs Manawa	6	(5)
International career
Years	Team	Apps	(Points)
2022–	Fiji	12	(5)

Jade Coates (born 7 September 1998) is a New Zealand-born Fijian rugby union player.

== Personal life ==
Coates grandmother is originally from Nananu Village in Tailevu; her father was born and raised in Fiji, and moved to New Zealand with his family at the age of 14. Her older sister, Brittany Coates, has represented Fiji in rugby sevens and fifteens internationally.

== Rugby career ==
Coates was not named in Fiji's squad for the 2021 Rugby World Cup due to injury.

In 2023, she joined Waikato, alongside her Fijiana teammate Bitila Tawake, in the Farah Palmer Cup in New Zealand.

Coates spent three seasons playing for the Fijian Drua women's side in the Super Rugby Women's competition. She recovered from an ankle surgery and returned to the Drua's squad for their opening match against the Queensland Reds for the 2024 season.

In 2025, she was named in the Chiefs Manawa squad for the Super Rugby Aupiki season. On 9 August, she was named in the Fijiana side to the 2025 Women's Rugby World Cup in England.
