= Joma Rubuti =

Fiji international rugby union player

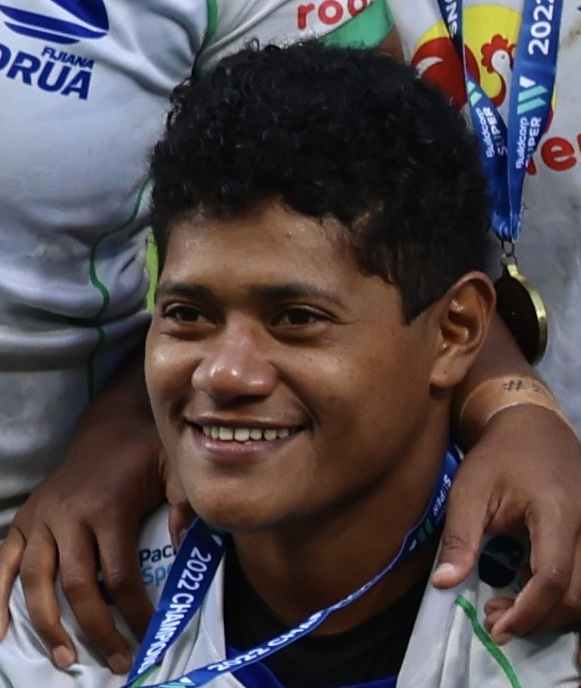
- Born: 9 February 1991 (age 35)

Rugby union career
- Position: Prop
Senior career
Years	Team	Apps	(Points)
2022	Fijiana Drua	6	(5)
International career
Years	Team	Apps	(Points)
2016–Present	Fiji	11	(5)

Joma Rubuti (born 9 February 1991) is a Fijian rugby union player.

== Biography ==
Rubuti made her international debut against Papua New Guinea at the 2016 Oceania Championship in Suva.

In 2022, Rubuti was named in the Fijiana Drua squad for Super W. She was a reserve in the Drua's Super W debut match against the Melbourne Rebels. She started against the Queensland Reds in round 2 and featured against the Western Force in round 3 of the Super W. Rubuti also featured against the Waratahs and scored her first Super W try against the Brumbies in the final round. She made the starting line up in the Grand Final against the Waratahs.

Rubuti was selected for the Fijiana squad for two test matches against Australia and Japan in May 2022. She started in the test against the Wallaroos in Australia. She also featured in the test match against Japan.

Rubuti was again named in the Fijiana squad for the 2022 Oceania Championship in New Zealand. She scored a try in Fiji's 152–0 trouncing of Papua New Guinea in the first round of the Oceania competition. She started in the games against Tonga and Samoa. In September she played in a warm up match against Canada. She was also named in the Fijiana squad for the 2021 Rugby World Cup.
