= Raijieli Laqeretabua =

Fiji international rugby union player

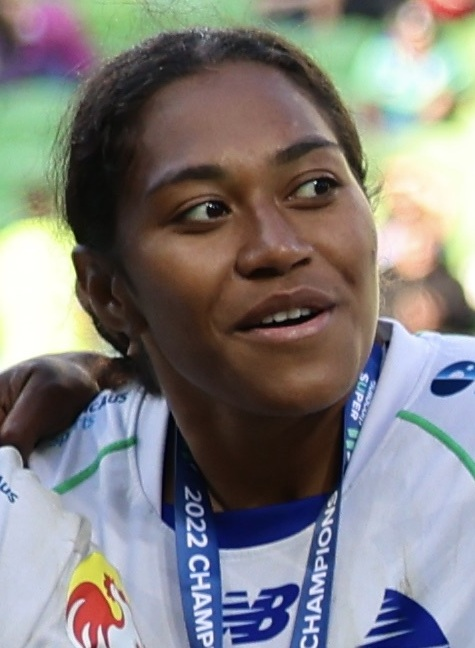
- Born: 1998 (age 27–28)
- Height: 1.69 m (5 ft 7 in)
- Weight: 81.7 kg (180 lb)

Rugby union career
- Position: Centre
Senior career
Years	Team	Apps	(Points)
2017–2019	Richmond		(20)
2019–2021	Saracens	18	(30)
Super Rugby
Years	Team	Apps	(Points)
2022	Fijiana Drua	4	(5)
2023	Western Force	0	(0)
International career
Years	Team	Apps	(Points)
2022	Fiji	5	(10)

Raijieli Victoria "Rachel" Laqeretabua is a Fijian rugby union player. She has played for Richmond and Saracens in the Premier 15s. She made her test debut for Fiji in 2022 and competed at the delayed 2021 Rugby World Cup. She also played for the Fijiana Drua before joining the Western Force in the Super W competition.

== Club career ==
Laqeretabua played for Richmond in the Premier 15s before joining Saracens in 2019.

=== 2022 ===
Laqeretabua was named in the Fijiana Drua squad for the 2022 Super W season. She made her Super W debut against the Reds in round two. She then scored her first try in round three against the Western Force. She featured in the match against the Waratahs, Fijiana Drua handed them their first Super W loss after a 20-game winning streak. She played against the Waratahs again in the Grand Final, the Fijiana Drua went to win the Super W competition in their debut season.

=== 2023 ===
Laqeretabua signed with the Western Force for the 2023 Super W season.

== International career ==
=== 2022 ===
Laqeretabua was named in the Fijiana squad for two test matches against Australia and Japan in May. She was in the starting lineup in the test against the Wallaroos.

Laqeretabua was selected in the Fijiana squad for the Oceania Championship in New Zealand. She scored a try in the 152–0 trouncing of Papua New Guinea. She featured against Tonga and scored a try against Samoa in the final round. In September she played in a warm up match against Canada. She was also named in the Fijiana squad for the delayed Rugby World Cup in New Zealand.

=== 2023 ===
Laqeretabua made the Fijiana 23-member squad that faced the Wallaroos on 20 May at the Allianz Stadium, her side lost to the Australians 22–5.
