= Akosita =

Akosita is a given name. Notable people with the given name include:

- ʻAkosita Lavulavu (born 1985), Tongan politician
- Akosita Ravato (born 1991), Fijian rugby union player
