= Amelia Whitaker =

Australian rugby union player

- Born: 11 September 2006 (age 20) Sydney, New South Wales, Australia
- Height: 172 cm (5 ft 8 in)
- Notable relative: Chris Whitaker (uncle)

Rugby union career
- Position: Wing
Super Rugby
Years	Team	Apps	(Points)
2025–present	NSW Waratahs		
International career
Years	Team	Apps	(Points)
2026-	Australia		

Amelia Whitaker (born 11 September 2006) is an Australian rugby union player who plays for New South Wales Waratahs Women and Australia. Her preferred position is wing.

== Club career ==
Whitaker made her debut for New South Wales Waratahs Women in the Super Rugby Women's league in 2025. Whitaker was named the NSW Waratahs player of the season in 2026 as they won the 2026 Super Rugby Women's championship title.

== International carer ==
Whitaker was part of the Australian U18 team which finished as runners-up at the Global Youth Tournament in 2024, where she was also named in the team of the tournament. Whitaker later played for Australia A in Rugby Sevens.

Whitaker was included in the Australia women's national rugby union team squad ahead of the 2026 WXV, and was named on the wing for Australia's opening game against England on 12 September. The following month, she scored her first tries for the team, with two in player-of-the-match performance in a 56-12 win against Scotland in the competition. In October 2026, she was nominated for Women’s 15s Breakthrough Player of the Year by World Rugby.

In November 2026, she was included in the Australia women's national rugby sevens team for the opening tournament in the 2026–27 SVNS in Dubai.

== Personal life ==
From Sydney, Whitaker's father Ben, is the General Manager of Men's High Performance and Competitions at Rugby Australia. She is the niece of Australian former rugby union player Chris Whitaker.
