= Mereoni Nakesa =

Fiji international rugby union player

- Born: 17 February 2003 (age 23)
- Height: 175 cm (5 ft 9 in)

Rugby union career
- Position: Lock
Super Rugby
Years	Team	Apps	(Points)
2023–	Fijian Drua		
International career
Years	Team	Apps	(Points)
2023–	Fiji	26	(10)

Mereoni Nakesa (born 17 February 2003) is a Fijian rugby union player. She plays Lock for Fiji internationally and for the Fijian Drua in the Super Rugby Women's competition. She competed for Fiji in the 2025 Women's Rugby World Cup.

== Rugby career ==
Nakesa only started playing rugby union later in life, although she played "locally" in her village. Her father, Ulaiasi Lawavou, is a former Fijian international in rugby sevens.

Her career officially began in 2022, when she represented Nadi in the women's Fijian provincial championship, the Skipper Cup; the competition was later renamed the Marama Championship. She was immediately noticed by national selectors who invited her to a training camp with the Fijiana Drua team.

In 2023, she played her first season of Super Rugby Women's, culminating in a title win against the Queensland Reds. She then made her international debut for Fiji in May, against the Wallaroos in Sydney. She started for Fiji when they lost by a single point to Samoa in the Oceania Championship. She played in the inaugural WXV 3 tournament at the end of the year, where Fiji finished second after being defeated by Spain 26–19.

In 2024, she continued her career in the Fijiana Drua squad, which lost its title to the Waratahs. The following month she returned to the national team and won the Oceania Championship, they also qualified for the Rugby World Cup.

Nakesa was named in Fiji's squad for the 2025 Women's Rugby World Cup in England.
