= Jemima McCalman =

Australia international rugby union player

- Height: 173 cm (5 ft 8 in)
- Weight: 66 kg (146 lb; 10 st 6 lb)

Rugby union career
- Position: Utility Back
Senior career
Years	Team	Apps	(Points)
- Brumbies
?–2025	Blagnac Rugby Women		
2025–	Leicester Tigers		
International career
Years	Team	Apps	(Points)
2022–	Australia	5	(0)

Jemima McCalman is an Australian rugby union player. She plays internationally for Australia and for the Brumbies in the Super W competition.

== Biography ==
McCalman had two pre-season training with the Waratahs but never debuted. She signed with the Brumbies for the 2022 Super W season and made her debut against the Waratahs.

McCalman made her international debut for Australia against Fiji on 6 May 2022 at the Suncorp Stadium in Brisbane. She earned her second cap for the Wallaroos against Japan on 10 May.

McCalman was later named in the Wallaroos squad for the 2022 Pacific Four Series in New Zealand. She started against the Black Ferns in the opening match of the series on 6 June. She later made her first Test start against the United States in the second round. She also started against Canada in the final round of the series, her side lost 10–22.

She will join Leicester Tigers Women for the 2025–26 Premiership Women's Rugby season.
