= Tamoi =

Tamoi is a surname. Notable people with the surname include:

- Rusila Tamoi (born 1984), Fijian rugby union and sevens player
- Timaima Tamoi (born 1987), Fijian rugby sevens player

== See also ==
- Mukim Tamoi, place in Brunei
