= Raijieli =

Raijieli is a feminine given name. Notable people with this name include:

- Raijieli Daveua (born 1992), Fijian rugby sevens player
- Raijieli Laqeretabua (born 1998), Fijian rugby union player
