= Merevesi Ofakimalino =

Fiji international rugby union player

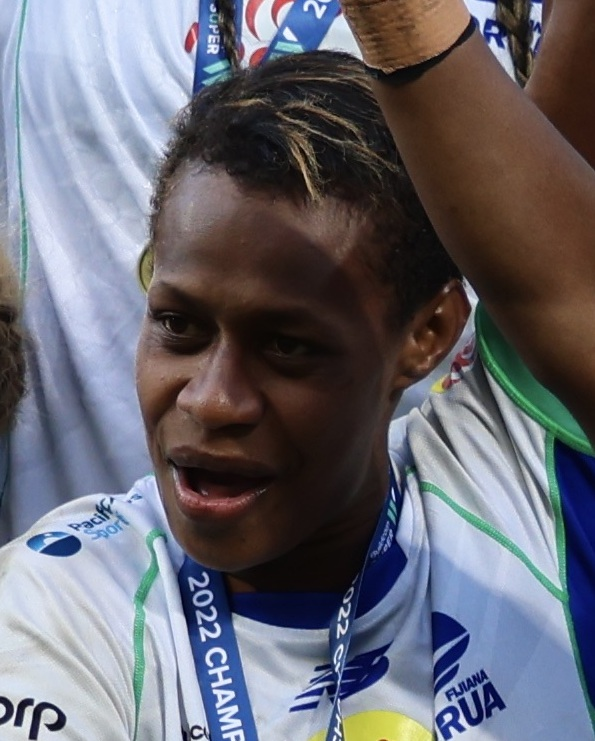
- Born: 30 March 1994 (age 32)

Rugby union career
- Position: Lock
Super Rugby
Years	Team	Apps	(Points)
2022	Fijiana Drua	4	(0)
International career
Years	Team	Apps	(Points)
2016–Present	Fiji	5	(5)
Association football career
- Position: Goalkeeper
International career
Years	Team	Apps	(Gls)
- Fiji

Merevesi Fuga Ofakimalino (born 30 March 1994) is a Fijian rugby union player. She plays for Suva in the ANZ Marama Championship and for Fiji at an international level.

== Rugby career ==
Ofakimalino made her international debut for Fiji against Papua New Guinea at the 2016 Oceania Championship. In December, she made an appearance for the Fijiana's again at the 2017 World Cup Repechage tournament against Japan and Hong Kong.

In 2022, Ofakimalino was selected for the Fijiana Drua squad for their Super W debut. She made her Super W debut against the Western Force in the third round of competition. She also featured against the Waratahs and the Brumbies in the final two rounds. She finally appeared in the Grand Final against the Waratahs as the Drua wrapped up a perfect season with their first title.

Ofakimalino was named in the Fijiana squad for two test matches against Australia and Japan in May. She came off the bench in the first test against Japan. She was in the starting line up in the second test against Australia.

Ofakimalino was recalled into the Fijiana squad for the 2022 Oceania Championship in New Zealand. She scored a try in the Fijiana's 152–0 annihilation of Papua New Guinea. She played in the test against Tonga which they won 34–7. In September she played in a warm up match against Canada. She was also named in the Fijiana squad for the 2021 Rugby World Cup.

In 2024, she was named in the Fijian Drua Women's side for the Super Rugby Women's season.

== Football career ==
Ofakimalino has also played as a goalkeeper for the Fiji women's national football team.
