= Vitalina Naikore =

Fiji international dual-code rugby player

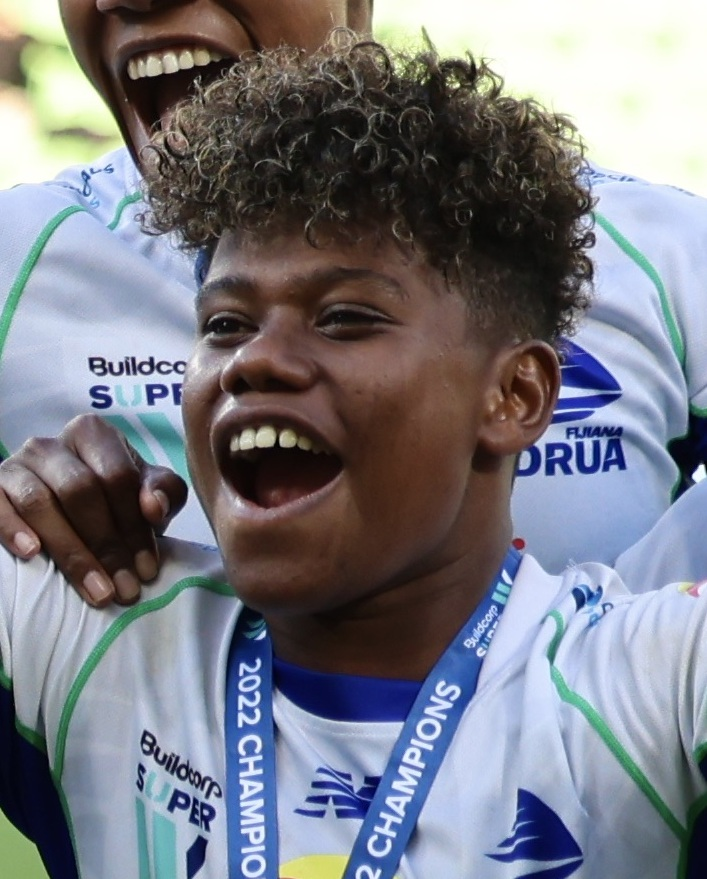
- Vitalina Naikore, professional rugby footballer

Personal information
- Full name: Vitalina Naikore
- Born: 25 August 2000 (age 24); Savusavu, Fiji
- Height: 160 cm (5 ft 3 in)
- Weight: 68 kg (10 st 10 lb)

Playing information

Rugby league
- Position: Wing
Club
Years	Team	Pld	T	G	FG	P
2023–24	North Qld Cowboys	11	5	0	0	20
Representative
Years	Team	Pld	T	G	FG	P
2023–24	Fiji	3	5	3	0	26

Rugby union
- Position: Wing
Club
Years	Team	Pld	T	G	FG	P
2022–	Fijiana Drua
Representative
Years	Team	Pld	T	G	FG	P
2021–23	Fiji
- Source: RLP As of 10 December 2024

Vitalina Naikore (born 25 August 2000) is a professional rugby union footballer who currently plays for the Fijiana Drua in the Super W.

Primarily a winger, she played rugby league from 2023 to 2024, playing for the North Queensland Cowboys in the NRL Women's Premiership and Fiji.

== Background ==
Naikore was born in Savusavu and was originally a soccer player while attending Holy Family Secondary School before switching to rugby union in 2019.

== Playing career ==
=== Rugby union ===
Naikore represented Fiji at the 2021 Rugby World Cup and 2022 Oceania Rugby Women's Championship.

In 2022, she joined the Fijiana Drua, scoring a hat trick in their Super W Grand Final win. She scored the fastest Super Rugby Women's try in the Drua's opening match against the NSW Waratahs in 2025, it was scored less than 10 seconds after the kick-off.

=== Rugby league ===
On 25 May 2023, Naikore signed a three-year contract with the North Queensland Cowboys, joining her Drua teammate Merewalesi Rokouono at the club.

In Round 1 of the 2023 NRL Women's season, she made her NRLW debut, coming off the bench in a 16–6 loss to the Gold Coast Titans. In Round 2, she started on the wing and scored two tries in a 31–20 win over the Newcastle Knights.
