= Ilisapeci Delaiwau =

Fiji international rugby union player

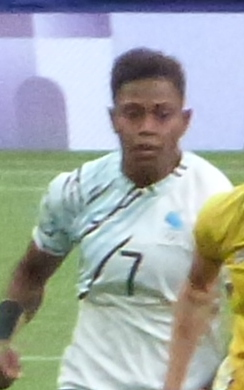
- Born: 1 June 2000 (age 26)
- Height: 1.63 m (5 ft 4 in)
- Weight: 65 kg (143 lb; 10 st 3 lb)

Rugby union career
- Position: Wing
International career
| Years | Team | Apps | (Points) |
| 2022- | Fiji | 5 | (30) |
National sevens team
| Years | Team | | Comps |
- Fiji

Ilisapeci Delaiwau (born 1 June 2000) is a Fijian rugby union player. She competed for the Fijiana XVs at the delayed 2021 Rugby World Cup and represented Fiji in rugby sevens at the 2024 Summer Olympics.

== Rugby career ==
Delaiwau was selected in the Fijiana squad for the 2022 Oceania Championship in New Zealand. She scored four tries as Fiji trounced Papua New Guinea 152–0. She also scored tries in the tests against Tonga and Samoa.

In September 2022, She was selected for the Fijiana squad to the 2021 Rugby World Cup in New Zealand.

She represented Fiji at the 2024 Summer Olympics in Paris.

On 9 August 2025, she was named in the Fijiana XVs side to the Women's Rugby World Cup in England. Delaiwau was ruled out for the remainder of the tournament after she sustained a hand injury in the opening match against Canada and was replaced by Repeka Mata.
