= Mereoni Vonosere =

Rugby union career
- Position: Tighthead Prop
International career
Years	Team	Apps	(Points)
2022	Fiji	3	(10)

Mereoni Vonosere Namositava is a Fijian rugby union player. She plays as a Tighthead Prop for Fiji.

== Rugby career ==
Vonosere was selected in Fiji's squad for the 2022 Oceania Championship in New Zealand. She scored a try in the 152–0 trouncing of Papua New Guinea. She also scored a try in Fijiana's 31–24 victory against Samoa.

In September 2022, She played in a warm up match against Canada. She was also named in the Fijiana squad for the 2021 Rugby World Cup.
