= Annabelle Codey =

Australia international rugby union player

- Born: 3 February 1997 (age 29) Brisbane
- Height: 1.83 m (6 ft 0 in)
- Weight: 80 kg (176 lb)

Rugby union career
- Position: Lock
Super Rugby
| Years | Team | Apps | (Points) |
| 2020-2023 | Queensland Reds | | (0) |
| 2024-Present | NSW Waratahs | | (0) |
International career
| Years | Team | Apps | (Points) |
| 2022– | Australia | 8 | (5) |

Annabelle Codey (born 3 February 1997) is an Australian rugby union player. She plays for Australia internationally, and for the NSW Waratahs in the Super Rugby Women's competition.

== Rugby career ==
Codey was named in Australia's squad for the 2022 Pacific Four Series in New Zealand. She made her international debut for the Wallaroos against New Zealand on 6 June at Tauranga.

Codey had a stint with the Loughborough Lightning in the Premier 15s before she returned to the Reds for the 2023 Super W season. She was selected for the Wallaroos side to the 2023 Pacific Four Series, and the O'Reilly Cup. She was suspended for one match after receiving a red card in Australia's WXV 1 match against England in October.

In 2024, she signed with the NSW Waratahs for the Super Rugby women's season.

She was named in the Wallaroos squad for the 2025 Women's Rugby World Cup in England.

== Personal life ==
Codey's father is former Queensland and Wallabies backrower, David Codey.
