= Sulita Waisega =

Fiji international rugby union player

- Born: 16 March 2004 (age 22)
- Height: 175 cm (5 ft 9 in)
- Weight: 91 kg (201 lb; 14 st 5 lb)

Rugby union career
- Position: Flanker
Super Rugby
| Years | Team | Apps | (Points) |
| 2024 | Fijian Drua | | (0) |
International career
| Years | Team | Apps | (Points) |
| 2022– | Fiji | 26 | (50) |

Sulita Waisega (born 16 March 2004) is a Fijian rugby union player. She competed for Fiji at the delayed 2021 Rugby World Cup in New Zealand.

== Early life ==
Waisega moved to the Netherlands with her parents when she was three. She plays rugby for the Haagsche Rugby Club.

== Rugby career ==
Waisega was named in the Fijiana squad for the 2022 Oceania Championship in New Zealand. She scored a try on her international debut in the Fijiana's 152–0 trouncing of Papua New Guinea. She was selected for the Fijiana squad to the 2021 Rugby World Cup in New Zealand.

Waisega started in the Fijiana fifteens squad that faced the Wallaroos on 20 May 2023 at the Allianz Stadium, her side went down 5–22. She was named in the Fijiana side for the 2024 Oceania Rugby Women's Championship in Brisbane.

On 9 August 2025, she was named in the Fijiana side to the Women's Rugby World Cup in England.
