= Jiowana Sauto =

- Born: March 13, 1998 (age 28)
- Height: 1.67 m (5 ft 5 1/2 in)
- Weight: 101 kg (223 lb; 15 st 13 lb)

Rugby union career
- Position: Front Row
Senior career
Years	Team	Apps	(Points)
2020	Yokohama TKM Rugby		(0)
Super Rugby
Years	Team	Apps	(Points)
2022	Fijiana Drua	2	(5)
2023–2024	Melbourne Rebels	10	(5)
2025	Queensland Reds		(0)
International career
Years	Team	Apps	(Points)
2018–2022	Fiji	1	(0)
National sevens team
Years	Team		Comps
2015–2018	Fiji		Olympics
- Rugby league career

Playing information
Representative
Years	Team	Pld	T	G	FG	P
2019	Fiji

Jiowana Sauto (born March 13, 1998) is a Fijian rugby sevens player. A dual international representing Fiji in both codes of Rugby Union and Rugby League and an Olympian named as a member of the Fijian women's national rugby sevens team representing Fiji at the 2016 Summer Olympics in Brazil. Jiowana Sauto made history in the world of rugby by scoring the first official try for the Fijiana Drua Women's team during their inaugural game and year in Australia's prestigious Super W competition in 2022 against the Melbourne Rebels.

== Biography ==
Sauto is from Vuna village located in Taveuni Island (the third biggest island in Fiji). Born and raised in Vuna, her love for the sport grew by watching her father and cousins play. She spent her high school years at Saint John's College in Cawaci, Ovalau Island. It was at Saint John's College that she was chosen to represent the Fiji Rugby Women Youth Team to the Commonwealth Games in Samoa in 2015 winning Bronze.

Sauto featured in the 2015–16 World Rugby Women's Sevens Series. She played at the 2015 Dubai Women's Sevens. She was also included in the squad for the 2016 USA Women's Sevens. She was in the squad for the 2016 France Women's Sevens.

She went on to represent Fiji at the 2016 Olympics in Rio de Janeiro where she continued her sevens rugby journey representing Fiji for the world sevens series until 2018. In 2018 she was named in the Fijiana 15 a side team that successfully qualified for their first ever World Cup after beating their Pacific Island neighbours to win the title of Oceania Champions.

2019 saw Jiowana become a dual international as she represented Fiji in Rugby League at the 2019 South Pacific games winning the gold medal.

In 2020 Jiowana was professionally contracted to play in Japan for the Yokohama TKM Women's Rugby Club.

Sauto was named on the bench in the warm up match against Canada ahead of the World Cup.

She was also selected for the Fijiana squad to the 2021 Rugby World Cup in New Zealand.

Jiowana later went on to be contracted as one of the first players of the inaugural Fijiana Drua teams of 2022 2022 Super W season, scoring the first try in their first official Super W match the team went on to win the entire Super W competition for the season.

Contracted by Melbourne Rebels for the 2023 and 2024 seasons. She played every game earning her "Top Prop" title by Australian Rugby for the 2024 Super W season, with highest statistics for minutes played, carries made, jackals won, defensive scrum penalties won and tackles made. She currently ranks as top Prop for the Super W competition in 2024 as per AU Rugby statistics.
