= Unaisi Tagabale =

Rugby union career
- Position: Utility Back
International career
Years	Team	Apps	(Points)
2022	Fiji	2	(5)

Unaisi Tagabale is a Fijian rugby union player. She made her international debut for Fiji on 9 July 2022 against Papua New Guinea at Massey Park. She came off the bench and scored a try in her sides 152–0 trouncing of the Cassowaries.

Tagabale was named in the Fijiana squad for the 2022 Oceania Championship in New Zealand. After her debut, she also featured in the match against Samoa.
