= 2016 Oceania Rugby Women's Championship =

Inaugural Oceania Championship for women's rugby

2016 Oceania Championship
- Event: 2017 Rugby World Cup Qualifier
Fiji	Papua New Guinea
(Fiji)	(Papua New Guinea)
37	10
- Date: 5 November 2016
- Venue: ANZ National Stadium, Suva
- Referee: (Samoa) Alan Aioluptota

The 2016 Oceania Rugby Women's Championship was the inaugural Oceania Championship for women's rugby in the region. It was held in Suva on November 5. It was part of the 2017 Rugby World Cup qualifying process.

== Teams ==
Three teams initially nominated for the tournament were Fiji, Papua New Guinea and Samoa. With their long history of World Cup participation, Samoa seemed to be favourites to become the region's entry. However, in a surprise move, Oceania Rugby refused Samoa's participation on the same grounds as World Rugby had barred Kenya and Uganda from African regional qualification – the lack of a robust domestic women's fifteens rugby tournament (almost all of Samoa's squads in past years had come from players living and playing in New Zealand and Australia). As such, the championship was decided in a one-off match between the remaining two teams, with Fiji winning to advance to the Repechage tournament in Hong Kong.

== Playoff match ==
Fiji	37–10	Papua New Guinea
Lawedrau 19'; Bulikiobo 33'; Deku 53'; Rokouono 62'; Vakaloloma 78', 80+'; Cons: Rokouono 53', 80+'; Pens: Rokouono 11'	Report	Lagona 22'; Kaore 48'

FB	15	Roela Radiniyavuni
RW	14	Limaina Wai
OC	13	Litiana Lawedrau
IC	12	Talica Vodo
LW	11	Paulini Ravouvou
FH	10	Merewalesi Rokouono
SH	9	Rejieli Uluinayau
N8	8	Sereana Nagatalevu
OF	7	Mere Moto
BF	6	Joma Rubuti
RL	5	Laisa Taga
LL	4	Fuga Ofakimalino
TP	3	Esiteri Bulikiobo
HK	2	Pasemaca Buadromo
LP	1	Lailanie Burnes (c)
Replacements:
	16	Vlisi Vakaloloma	Substituted in
	17	Mereoni Yabakidrau	Substituted in
	18	Jowana Vuni	Substituted in
	19	Makereta Tunidau	Substituted in
	20	Sainimere Naleweniikataga	Substituted in
	21	Tavaita Rowati	Substituted in
	22	Mereani Moceituba	Substituted in
	23	Wainikiti Deku
Coach:
(Fiji) Seremaia Bai

FB	15	Joanne Lagona
RW	14	Cassandra Sampson
OC	13	Marlugu Dixon
IC	12	Kymlie Rapilla
LW	11	Nina Stein
FH	10	Margaret Naua (c)
SH	9	Victoria Kamen
N8	8	Debbie Kaore
OF	7	Lynette Kwarula
BF	6	Melanie Kawa
RL	5	Clara Biyamah
LL	4	Isi Govea
TP	3	Norah Wartovo
HK	2	Jane Buku
LP	1	Pamela Waringe
Replacements:
	16	Lorraine Pomat	Substituted in
	17	Geua Larry	Substituted in
	18	Tracy Stains	Substituted in
	19	Harkana Dixon	Substituted in
	20	Theresanne Daimol
	21	Angela Parao	Substituted in
	23	Augusta Livuana	Substituted in
	24	Helen Abau	Substituted in
Coach:
(Papua New Guinea) Sydney Wesley
