= Rusila Tamoi =

Fijian rugby union and sevens player

- Born: 19 September 1984 (age 42)
- Height: 1.56 m (5 ft 1 in)
- Weight: 60 kg (132 lb)

Rugby union career
- Position(s): Wing, Scrum-half
Senior career
Years	Team	Apps	(Points)
2022	Fijiana Drua	5	(5)
International career
Years	Team	Apps	(Points)
2016–Present	Fiji	3	(0)
National sevens team
Years	Team		Comps
2011	Fiji		

Rusila Tamoi (born 19 September 1984) is a Fijian rugby union and sevens player. She made her international debut for Fiji against Hong Kong, in the final 2017 Rugby World Cup Asia/Oceania Qualifier in Hong Kong.

== Biography ==
Tamoi was selected for the Fijiana Drua squad who were making their debut in the Super W competition. She was in the starting line up as the Drua played their inaugural match against the Rebels. She came off the bench In the second game against the Reds as the Drua recorded another win. She was part of the team who faced the Waratahs and gave them their first defeat in the Super W. She scored her first Super W try in the 52nd minute in the final game against the Brumbies. She appeared in the Grand Final as the Drua met the Waratahs, they defeated them and won their first title.

Tamoi was named in the Fijiana team for two test matches against Australia and Japan in May 2022. She was in the starting line up in the Fijiana's Japan test. She came off the bench in their 36–19 loss to Australia.
