= Bernadette Robertson =

Samoa international rugby union player (born 1993)

- Born: 4 June 1993 (age 33)
- Height: 1.68 m (5 ft 6 in)
- Weight: 75 kg (165 lb)

Rugby union career
- Position(s): Centre, Wing
Provincial / State sides
Years	Team	Apps	(Points)
2016, 2018–22	Wellington	30	(35)
2017	Counties Manukau	8	(25)
Super Rugby
Years	Team	Apps	(Points)
2023	Hurricanes Poua	2	(0)
International career
Years	Team	Apps	(Points)
- Samoa

Bernadette Robertson (born 4 June 1993) is a Samoan rugby union player. She represented Samoa at the 2014 Women's Rugby World Cup in France. She currently plays for Hurricanes Poua in the Super Rugby Aupiki competition.

== Background ==
Robertson graduated with a Bachelor of Electrical and Electronic Engineering from the University of Auckland in 2015.

== Rugby career ==
Robertson competed for Samoa at the 2014 Women's Rugby World Cup in France. She has played for Counties Manukau and Wellington in the Farah Palmer Cup competition.

Robertson was selected for Manusina Samoa's squad to the 2022 Oceania Rugby Women's Championship in New Zealand. She started in Samoa's opening match against Tonga at Massey Park. She scored a try in her sides 91–0 trouncing of Papua New Guinea in the second round.

Robertson signed with Hurricanes Poua for the 2023 Super Rugby Aupiki season. On 25 February, She made her debut for Hurricanes Poua against Chiefs Manawa in the opening match of the competition.
