= Merewalesi Rokouono =

Fiji international rugby union player (born 1994)

Personal information
- Full name: Merewalesi Rokouono
- Born: 15 September 1994 (age 32) Nadi, Fiji
- Height: 171 cm (5 ft 7 in)
- Weight: 74 kg (11 st 9 lb)

Playing information

Rugby union
- Position: Wing
Club
Years	Team	Pld	T	G	FG	P
2022–24	Fijiana Drua	6				36
Representative
Years	Team	Pld	T	G	FG	P
2016–22	Fiji	8				21
2018–22	Fiji Sevens	21				24

Rugby league
- Position: Five-eighth
Club
Years	Team	Pld	T	G	FG	P
2023	North Qld Cowboys	1	0	0	0	0
Representative
Years	Team	Pld	T	G	FG	P
2023	Fiji	1	0	0	0	0
- Source: RLP As of 5 November 2023

Merewalesi Rokouono (born 15 September 1994) is a Fijian rugby league, rugby union and sevens player. She competed for both Fiji in the 2021 Rugby League World Cup at rugby league and for Fiji in rugby union at the 2021 Rugby World Cup. She played for the North Queensland Cowboys in the 2023 NRL Women's season.

== Playing career ==
=== Rugby union ===
Rokouono made her international debut for the Fiji XV's against Papua New Guinea at the 2016 Oceania Championship. A month later, she appeared for the Fijiana again at the 2017 World Cup Repechage tournament against Japan and Hong Kong.

Rokouono also represented Fiji in sevens rugby and featured in the 2018–19 Women's Sevens Series. She played in the Dubai Sevens as the Fijiana finished in twelfth place. She scored a try in the Challenge Trophy semi-finals to beat China 12–0 and progress to the final at the Sydney Sevens. She then featured at the Langford Sevens in Canada as the Fijiana fought to remain in the top 10 of the World Sevens Series.

In 2022, Rokouono was named in the Fijiana Drua squad in their debut Super W season. She made her Super W debut against the Rebels in the first round and scored 16 points. She also made appearances against the Reds and the Western Force. She then helped end the Waratahs 20 game winning streak as they handed them their first-ever defeat with a 29–10 victory. She also played in the final round against the Brumbies in their 17–7 win. Rokouono appeared in the Grand Final against the Waratahs as the Drua wrapped up a perfect season by claiming their first title.

Rokouono was selected in the Fijiana squad for two test matches against Australia and Japan in May 2022. She started in the first test as Fiji lost 28–14 to Japan at the Gold Coast in Queensland. She then came off the bench in the Fijiana first meeting with Australia.

In July, Rokouono was recalled into the Fijiana squad for the Oceania Championship in New Zealand. She scored a try in the record 152–0 annihilation of Papua New Guinea. She kicked a conversion to beat Samoa 31–24. In September she played in a warm up match against Canada. She was also named in the Fijiana squad for the 2021 Rugby World Cup.

=== Rugby league ===
In May 2023, the North Queensland Cowboys announced that Rokouono and her Drua teammate Vitalina Naikore had signed with the rugby league club for the 2023 NRL Women's season.

In Round 9 of the 2023 NRL Women's season, she made her debut for the Cowboys in a loss to the Sydney Roosters. Rokouono played for Fiji Bulikula on 15 October 2023 against Samoa. She returned to rugby union at the end of the 2023 season.
