= Akosita Ravato =

Fijian rugby union player

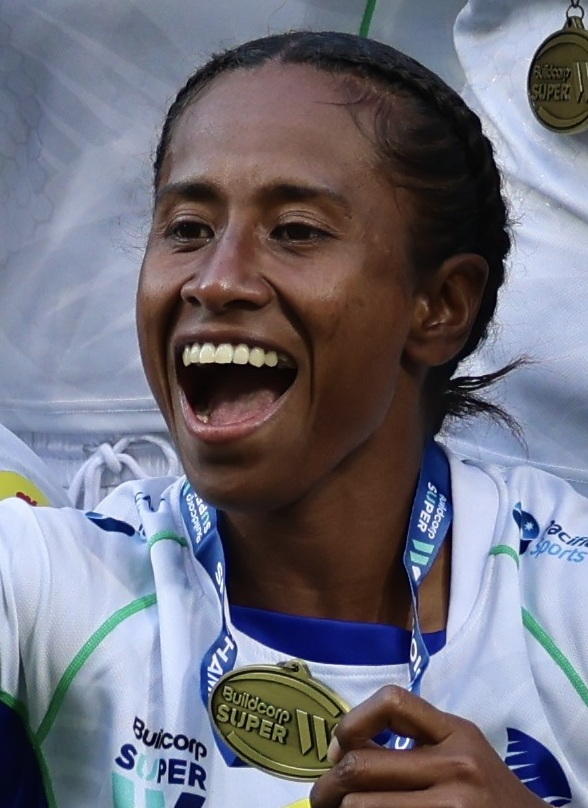
- Born: 16 May 1991 (age 35)
- Height: 1.74 m (5 ft 9 in)
- Weight: 73 kg (161 lb)

Rugby union career
- Position: Forward
Senior career
Years	Team	Apps	(Points)
2022	Fijiana Drua	5	(0)
International career
Years	Team	Apps	(Points)
2022	Fiji	3	(5)

Akosita Ravato (born 16 April 1991) is a Fijian rugby union player. She plays for Fiji internationally and for the Fijiana Drua in the Super W competition.

== Biography ==
Ravato previously represented Fiji in basketball at the age of 15 while still a student at Yat Sen Secondary School.

In 2022, Ravato was named in the Fijiana Drua squad for the Super W competition. She made her Super W debut against the Queensland Reds in round 2. She featured in the Drua side that handed the Waratahs women their first Super W loss. She was named on the reserves for the Grand Final against the Waratahs.

Ravato came off the bench against Australia when the two sides met for the first time in 2022. She featured at the 2022 Oceania Championship in New Zealand. She was named in the reserves against Tonga and scored a try in Fijiana's final game against Samoa.

In September 2022, She was selected for the Fijiana squad to the 2021 Rugby World Cup in New Zealand.
