= Vika Matarugu =

Fiji international rugby union player

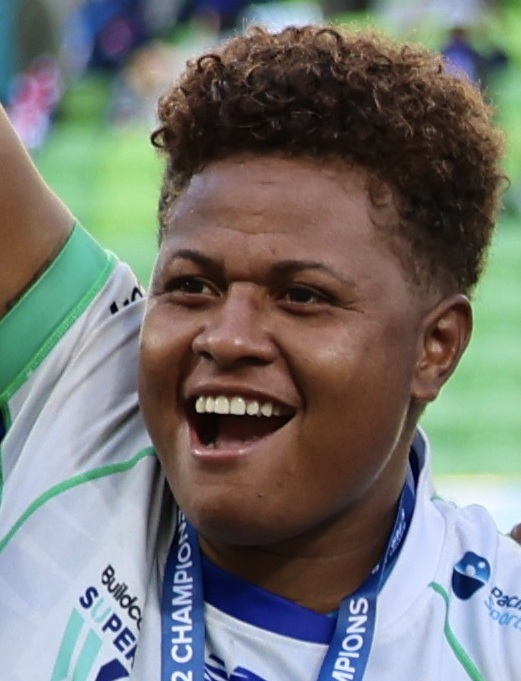
- Matarugu in 2022
- Born: 2 August 1994 (age 32)
- Height: 173 cm (5 ft 8 in)

Rugby union career
- Position: Prop
Super Rugby
Years	Team	Apps	(Points)
2022; 2024–	Fijian Drua		
2023	Melbourne Rebels		
International career
Years	Team	Apps	(Points)
	Fiji	22	(30)

Vika Matarugu (born 2 August 1994) is a Fijian rugby union player. She competed for Fiji in the 2021 and 2025 Women's Rugby World Cups.

== Early life ==
Matarugu attended Dilkusha Methodist High School. She comes from Nukusa village in the province of Macuata in Vanua Levu.

== Rugby career ==
In 2022, Matarugu was named in the Fijiana squad for the delayed 2021 Rugby World Cup in New Zealand. She was cited for an act of foul play in their match against South Africa, but it was dismissed by the independent disciplinary committee.

After the World Cup, she led the Army women to victory against Police in the Women's Ratu Sukuna Bowl competition, her side won 13–7.

She played for the Melbourne Rebels in the 2023 Super W season. She then spent 11 months recovering from a knee injury before she returned to the Fijian Drua for the 2024 season.

She captained the Fijian Drua side for the 2025 Super Rugby Women's season.

Matarugu was selected in Fiji's squad for the 2025 Women's Rugby World Cup in England. She started in their second match against Scotland.
