= Cecilia Smith (rugby union) =

- Born: 13 March 1994 (age 32) Apia, Samoa
- Height: 1.69 m (5 ft 7 in)
- Weight: 70 kg (154 lb)
- School: Leeton High School

Rugby union career
- Position: Centre
Super Rugby
Years	Team	Apps	(Points)
2019–2024	Queensland Reds	28	(50)
2025	Western Force		(0)
International career
Years	Team	Apps	(Points)
2022–	Australia	28	(31)

Cecilia Smith (born 13 March 1994) is an Australian rugby union player. She captains the Queensland Reds in the Super Rugby Women's competition and for Australia internationally. She was part of Australia's 2021 Rugby World Cup squad.

== Rugby career ==
Smith was named in Australia's squad for the 2022 Pacific Four Series in New Zealand. She made her international debut for the Wallaroos against New Zealand on 12 June at Tauranga. She was named in the Australian squad for a two-test series against the Black Ferns at the Laurie O'Reilly Cup.

In October 2022, Smith made her first Rugby World Cup appearance at the delayed tournament in New Zealand.

In the Wallaroos first game of the year, Smith scored her sides first try as they beat Fiji 22–5 on 20 May at the Allianz Stadium. She was selected again in the Wallaroos side for the 2023 Pacific Four Series, and the O'Reilly Cup.

On 5 March 2024, Smith was named as captain of the Queensland Reds Super Rugby Women's side.

In 2025, she was called into the Wallaroos side for the Women's Rugby World Cup in England.
