= Fulori Nabura =

Rugby union career
- Position: Flanker
International career
| Years | Team | Apps | (Points) |
| 2022 | Fiji | 3 | (10) |

Fulori Nabura is a Fijian rugby union player.

== Biography ==
Nabura was named in the Fijiana squad for the 2022 Oceania Championship in New Zealand. She scored a try in the record 152–0 match against Papua New Guinea. She was named as a reserve in the test against Tonga and was in the starting lineup for the game against Samoa.

Nabura was named in the starting line up for the test against Papua New Guinea at the 2023 Oceania Rugby Women's Championship, she scored a try in her sides 77–0 victory in Gold Coast.
