= Ella Goldsmith =

Australian rugby union referee

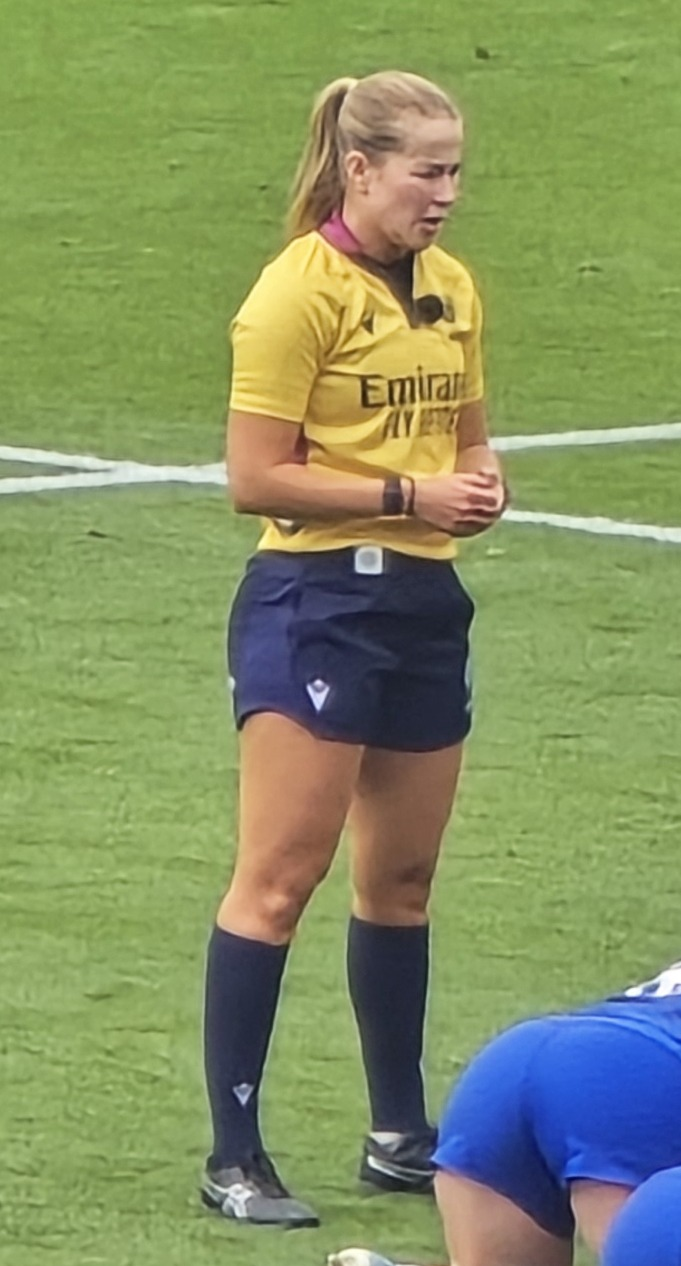
- 2025 Women's Rugby World Cup - New Zealand vs France
- Born: Ella Goldsmith; 1997 or 1998 (age 28–29)
- Occupation: Rugby union referee

Rugby union career
Refereeing career
Years	Competition	Apps
2023-	Super Rugby	
2023-	Test match	
- Correct as of 23 September 2025

Ella Goldsmith is an Australian rugby union referee and formerly a rugby union footballer and an Australian Rules Footballer. After being selected as a referee for the 2025 Women's Rugby World Cup and impressing during 2 performances in the pool stages Goldsmith was selected to officiate the Bronze medal match between New Zealand and France.
