= 2019 Super W season =

Australian women's rugby union season

2019 Super W
- Countries: Australia (5 teams)
- Tournament format(s): Round-robin and knockout
- Champions: Waratahs Women (2nd title)
- Matches played: 12

The 2019 Super W season was the second year of the women's Super W rugby union competition held in Australia. A change to the finals format was made in 2019, with an additional playoff match added for the teams which finished second and third in regular season. Queensland, as winner of that match over the Brumbies, travelled to Sydney to play in the competition decider against the NSW Waratahs, who were hosts of the final due to finishing top of the ladder in the regular season. The 2019 Super W title was won by NSW Waratahs, defeating Queensland 8–5 in the final.

== Teams ==
Five women's teams again played in the Super W competition. Western Australia's team was rebranded as the RugbyWA Women for 2019, having been named the Western Force Women in 2018.

Team name	Location	Coach	Captain	Ref
Brumbies Women	Canberra, Australian Capital Territory	Adam Butt	Shellie Milward	
Waratahs Women	Sydney, New South Wales	Matt Evrard	Ashleigh Hewson	
Queensland Reds Women	Brisbane, Queensland	Moana Virtue	Kiri Lingman	
Melbourne Rebels Women	Melbourne Victoria	Alana Thomas	Jayne Kareroa	
RugbyWA	Perth, Western Australia	Shannon Symon	Mhicca Carter	

== Regular season ==
=== Standings ===
Completed standings after all rounds:

2019 Super W – Regular season
Pos	Team	Pld	W	D	L	PF	PA	PD	TB	LB	Pts
1	Waratahs Women	4	4	0	0	138	24	+114	3	0	19
2	Queensland Reds Women	4	3	0	1	164	18	+146	2	1	15
3	Brumbies Women	4	2	0	2	86	50	+36	1	0	9
4	RugbyWA	4	1	0	3	53	86	−33	1	0	6
5	Melbourne Rebels Women	4	0	0	4	22	285	−263	0	0	0

Updated to match(es) played on 24 March 2019. Source: rugbyarchive.net

=== Results ===
==== Round 1 ====
23 February 2019	Brumbies	0–26	Waratahs Women	GIO Stadium, Canberra
17:00		Report	Try: Naiqama 10'; Murphy 26'; Hamilton 19', 52'; Con: Hewson 11', 20', 53'; Cards: O'Neil (yellow card)	Referee: Amy Perrett

24 February 2019	Melbourne Rebels Women	0–112	Queensland Reds Women	Box Hill Rugby Club, Victoria
15:00		Report	Try: Gould 2'; Sekona 9', 42'; Smith 17', 36'; Lefau-Fakaosilea 20', 64', 72'; Wong 27', 60', 70'; Elisaia 33', 39', 75'; Cramer 45'; Morgan 51'; Lingman 56'; Con: Cramer 21', 29', 34', 37', 40', 46', 52', 57', 65', 71', 73', 76'; Pen: Cramer 31'	Referee: Amber Mclachlan

==== Round 2 ====
2 March 2019	Queensland Reds Women	28–3	RugbyWA	Suncorp Stadium, Brisbane
17:00	Try: Elisaia 33'; Smith 50'; Lefau-Fakaosilea 64'; Wong 72'; Con: Cramer 65'; Pen: Cramer 20', 60'	Report	Pen: Cope 17'	Referee: Lara West

3 March 2019	Brumbies Women	69–0	Queensland Reds Women	Seiffert Oval, Queanbeyan
17:00	Try: Stanford 6', 19', 22'; Crothers 9', 54'; Penalty Try 13'; Wilton 34', 47'; Perry 58'; Read 78'; Con: Wood 7', 10', 20', 35', 48'; McDonald 59'	Report		Referee: Brodie Ingram

==== Round 3 ====
8 March 2019	Melbourne Rebels Women	10–38	RugbyWA	AAMI Park, Melbourne
17:10	Try: Fagalilo 69'; Con: Marsters 71'; Pen: Landkauf 14'	Report	Try: Carter 9', 31'; Kareopa 22'; Hira-Herangi 25'; Mason 37', 73'; Con: Pomare 26', 32', 39', 74'; Cards: Mason (yellow card) 58' to 68'	Referee: Amber Mclachlan

10 March 2019	Waratahs Women	15–12	Queensland	Leichhardt Oval, Leichhardt
15:00	Try: Stewart 14'; Parker 21'; Con: Hewson 22'; Pen: Hewson 36'	Report	Try: Elisaia 6'; Wong 65'; Con: Cramer 7'; Cards: Sekona (yellow card) 30' to 40'	Referee: Amy Perrett

==== Round 4 ====
16 March 2019	Queensland Reds Women	12–0	Brumbies	Ballymore, Brisbane
16:00	Try: Smith 22', 66'; Con: Gould 24'	Report		Referee: Lara West

17 March 2019	RugbyWA	0–31	Waratahs Women	Curtin University, Bentley
18:30		Report	Try: Leaupepe 8'; Leaupepe 8'; Parker 40'; Leaupepe 43'; Maguire 67'; Con: Hewson 10', 40+1', 68'	Referee: Amber Mclachlan

==== Round 5 ====
24 March 2019	Waratahs Women	66–12	Melbourne Rebels	Anne Ashwood Park, Bathurst
15:00	Try: Stewart 1'; Horomia 7'; McKenzie 9'; Hewson 24'; Parker 26', 29', 54', 58'; Fatu 44', 71'; Con: Hewson 8', 10', 25', 28', 30', 45', 54', 72'	Report	Try: Boysen 18'; Tupou 39'; Con: Landkauf 19'	Referee: Madeline Putz

24 March 2019	Western Force Women	12–17	Brumbies Women	Kingsway Reserve, Madeley
17:00	Try: Nielson 1'; Mason 76'; Con: Cope 77'	Report	Try: O'Neill 9'; Wilton 13'; Stanford 40+2'; Con: Wood 11'	Referee: Tyler Miller

== Finals ==
Teams finishing second and third after the round-robin stage met in a playoff to determine which side would progress to the grand final against the first-placed team from the regular season. The grand final winner became the Super W champion.

=== Playoff ===
31 March 2019	Queensland Reds Women	39–10	Brumbies	Ballymore, Brisbane
15:30	Try: Cramer 13'; Wong 32'; Elisaia 47'; Ngaha 61'; Boyle 68'; Turner 74'; Con: Gould 14'; Cramer 62', 76'; Pen: Cramer 53'	Report	Try: Dawa 38'; Con: Wood 40'; Pen: Wood 56'	Referee: Amber Mclachlan

=== Grand final ===
7 April 2019	Waratahs Women	8–5	Queensland Reds Women	Leichhardt Oval, Leichhardt
16:30	Try: Hamilton 54'; Pen: Hewson 4'	Report	Try: Elisaia 17'	Referee: Amy Perrett

== See also ==
- Women's rugby union
