= 2018 Super W season =

Australian women's rugby union season

2018 Super W
- Countries: Australia (5 teams)
- Tournament format(s): Round robin
- Champions: Waratahs
- Matches played: 11
- Tries scored: 77 (7 per match)
- Top point scorer(s): Ashleigh Hewson (37)
- Top try scorer(s): Courtney Hodder (7)

The 2018 Super W season was the inaugural year of the women's Super W rugby union competition. The winners were the New South Wales Waratahs.

== Ladder ==
Team	P	W	L	Pts	F	A	F/A
Waratahs Women	4	4	0	18	131	15	116
Queensland Reds Women	4	3	1	14	134	53	81
Western Force Women	4	2	2	10	154	87	67
Brumbies Women	4	1	3	5	57	103	-46
Melbourne Rebels Women	4	0	4	0	21	239	-218

== Results ==
=== Week 1 ===
10 March 2018
16:00

Queensland Reds Women	0–18	Waratahs Women
	Report	Try: Leaupepe 14'; Lafai 53'; Con: Hewson; Pen: Hewson 2

Suncorp Stadium, Brisbane
Referee: Amber Hibbard

11 March 2018
15:00

Western Force	85–13	Melbourne Rebels
Try: Tuafa 1'; Hodder 5',9',19',25',54',72'; Reed 17'; Kareopa 29',49'; Pomare 57'; Putz 64'; Wickliffe 77'; Con: Fell 5 Cope 3 Pomare 1 Wickliffe1	Report	Try: Lelei 40'; Marsters 67'; Pen: Cormick

Harvey Field, Western Australia
Referee: Sam Jones

=== Week 2 ===
17 March 2018
16:00

Brumbies	5–42	Queensland Reds Women
Con: Cox 19'	Report	Try: Gould 28'; Lefau-Fakaosilea 42',76'; Filimoehala 48'; Wong 58'; Riordan 73'; Con: Gould 2 Treherne; Pen: Gould 2

GIO Stadium, Canberra
Referee: Reuben Keane

18 March 2018
12:30

NSW Waratahs	32–10	Western Force
Try: Hamilton 3'; Lafai 37'; Laman 56'; Parker 58',73'; Con: Hewson 2 Pen: Hewson	Report	Try: Cope 34'; Con: Cope; Pen: Cope

Allianz Stadium, Sydney
Referee: James Quinn

=== Week 3 ===
24 March 2018
14:00

NSW Waratahs	24–5	Brumbies
Try: Leaupepe 19',41'; Parker 67'; Con: Leaupepe 3 Pen: Leaupepe	Report	Try: Gubb 36'

Pittwater Park, NSW
Referee: Tyler Miller

25 March 2018
13:30

Queensland Reds Women	60–0	Melbourne Rebels
Try: Riodan 1',27',45'; Treherne 14'; Cramer 17'; Campbell 50'; Lefau-Fakaosilea 55'; Kaleta 67'; Rasolea 72'; Con: Gould 6 Pen: Gould	Report

Ballymore, Brisbane
Referee: Lara West

=== Week 4 ===
30 March 2018
16:00

Melbourne Rebels	8–37	Brumbies
Try: Marsters 37'; Pen: Cormick	Report	Try: Read 9'; Wilton 27'; Burrows 48'; Stanford 40'; Wilson 68'; Milward 71'; Con: Wood 2 Pen: Wood

AAMI Park, Melbourne
Referee: Lara West

31 March 2018
14:00

Western Force	30–32	Queensland Reds Women
Try: Waterson 25'; Pomare 41'; Wickliffe 47'; Fell 55'; Con: Cope 2 Pen: Cope 2	Report	Try: Lefau-Fakaosilea 1',60',77'; Treherne 5',64',67'; Con: Temara

Kingsway Reserve, Western Australia
Referee: Graham Cooper

=== Week 5 ===
7 April 2018
15:00

Melbourne Rebels	0–57	NSW Waratahs
	Report	Try: Batibasaga 2'; O'Brien 15'; Maguire 20',27'; Parker 34',40'; Cherrington 46'; Jones 52'; Hamilton 69'; Con: Hewson 6

Box Hill Rugby Club, Victoria
Referee: Amber Hibbard

7 April 2018
17:00

Brumbies	10–29	Western Force
Try: Milward 5',72'	Report	Try: Kareopa 49'; Tauhima 56',60'; Hodder 67'; Con: Cope 3 Pen: Cope

GIO Stadium, Canberra
Referee: Brodie Ingram

=== Grand Final ===
20 April 2018
16:45

Waratahs Women	16–13	Queensland Reds Women
Try: Fatu 65'; Con: Hewson; Pen: Hewson 3	Report	Try: Gould 18'; Marsters 46'; Pen: Temara

Allianz Stadium, Sydney
Referee: James Quinn
