= Cassie Siataga =

Samoa international rugby union player

- Born: 27 November 1995 (age 30) Christchurch, New Zealand
- Height: 174 cm (5 ft 9 in)
- Weight: 82 kg (181 lb; 12 st 13 lb)

Rugby union career
- Position: Fly-half
Provincial / State sides
Years	Team	Apps	(Points)
2017–2020	Canterbury	29	(29)
2022–2023	Tasman	12	(87)
2025–	Hawke's Bay	1	(2)
Super Rugby
Years	Team	Apps	(Points)
2024	Melbourne Rebels		(0)
2025–	Hurricanes Poua	6	(21)
International career
Years	Team	Apps	(Points)
2022–	Samoa		(0)
- Rugby league career

Playing information
- Position: Scrum-half
Representative
Years	Team	Pld	T	G	FG	P
2020	Samoa	1	0	0	0	0
- As of 13 November 2026

Cassie Siataga (born 27 November 1995) is a Samoan rugby union and rugby league player. She is a dual-code international having represented both Samoa and Samoa; she plays club rugby for Hurricanes Poua in the Super Rugby Aupiki competition.

== Early life and career ==
Siataga was born and raised in Christchurch, and was coached by former All Blacks forwards coach, Mike Cron, in primary school.

== Softball career ==
Siataga was selected for the New Zealand women's national softball team as a teenager, she played as a shortstop for the side. She attended Midland College in Texas on a softball scholarship.

She played representative softball for the Canterbury Red Sox and for Sydenham Kereru. She also played representative rugby league.

== Rugby career ==
On 7 November 2020 she made her debut for Samoa in the 28-8 defeat to New Zealand in Auckland

Siataga made her international debut for Samoa in 2022. She represented Canterbury at provincial level and was a member of the teams that won four consecutive Farah Palmer Cups from 2017 to 2020.

In 2021, she left rugby for awhile due to burnout. In 2022, she rediscovered her love for rugby while playing club rugby for Linwood. She later played for Tasman provincially and was named player of the year in 2022.

During the 2023 Oceania Rugby Women's Championship, she helped Samoa win their first Championship title when she scored all of her team's points in their 19–18 victory over Fiji. The win also confirmed the Manusina's place in the inaugural 2023 WXV 2 tournament in South Africa.

On 20 February 2024, she was named in the Melbourne Rebels squad for their final Super Rugby Women's season. Later that year on 30 October, she was named in the Hurricanes Poua squad for the 2025 Super Rugby Aupiki season.
