= Jasmin Huriwai =

Australia international rugby union & league player

Personal information
- Born: 27 September 1993 (age 33) Auckland, New Zealand

Playing information

Rugby union
- Position: Half-back
Club
Years	Team	Pld	T	G	FG	P
2023–25	Brumbies	6				10
Representative
Years	Team	Pld	T	G	FG	P
2023–25	Australia	6				0

Rugby league
Club
Years	Team	Pld	T	G	FG	P
2026–	New Zealand Warriors	10	2	3	0	14
- As of 1 November 2026
- Education: Fairvale High School

Jasmin Huriwai (born 27 September 1993) is an Australian rugby union & rugby league player. She plays for the New Zealand Warriors in the NRLW competition.

== Rugby union career ==
Huriwai was named at half-back in the Brumbies squad for the 2023 Super W season. Her try in the 66th minute helped her side defeat the Melbourne Rebels 30–23 in round four of the competition. She scored a try in round five when her side defeated the Western Force, 45–27, in Perth.

Huriwai made her test debut for the Wallaroos against Fiji on 20 May 2023 at the Allianz Stadium.

== Rugby league career ==
=== New Zealand Warriors Women ===
On 24 April 2026 it was reported that she had signed for New Zealand Warriors in the NRLW
