= Luisa Tisolo =

Fijian rugby sevens player (born 1991)

- Born: September 20, 1991 (age 35)
- Height: 1.75 m (5 ft 9 in)
- Weight: 63 kg (139 lb)

Rugby union career
Super Rugby
Years	Team	Apps	(Points)
2025	Fijian Drua		(0)
International career
Years	Team	Apps	(Points)
2023	Fiji	1	(0)
National sevens team
Years	Team		Comps
2016	Fiji		93 (298)

Luisa Tisolo (born September 20, 1991) is a Fijian rugby sevens player. She competed for Fiji at the 2016 Summer Olympics in Rio.

== Rugby career ==
Tisolo was selected as a member of the Fijian women's national rugby sevens team for the 2016 Summer Olympics in Brazil. She scored Fiji's first try in the Olympic Games.

On 20 May 2023, Tisolo started for the Fijiana fifteens in their test against the Wallaroos at the Allianz Stadium, her side lost 22–5.
