= 2021 Super W season =

Australian women's rugby union season

2021 Super W
- Countries: Australia
- Number of teams: 6
- Champions: NSW Waratahs Women
- Runners-up: Queensland Reds Women
- Matches played: 10
- Tries scored: 59 (average 5.9 per match)
- Top point scorer: Arabella McKenzie (51)
- Top try scorer: Maya Stewart (7)

The 2021 Super W season had a different format to previous seasons. With the inclusion of the President's XV, teams were split into two pools of three. This format however was only for the 2021 season. The competition will revert to the usual home and away format in 2022. After the first round of the season the Western Force withdrew from the competition due to the ongoing COVID-19 outbreak in New South Wales. NSW Waratahs won their fourth consecutive Super W title after defeating Queensland 45 - 12 in the final. A Super W Select team played the Presidents XV in the finals, they replaced the Western Force. The Super W Select were only given 48 hours to prepare.

== Teams ==
Team name	Location
Brumbies Women	Canberra, Australian Capital Territory
NSW Waratahs Women	Sydney, New South Wales
Queensland Reds Women	Brisbane, Queensland
Melbourne Rebels Women	Melbourne, Victoria
Western Force Women	Perth, Western Australia
President's XV	Coffs Harbour, New South Wales

== Ladder ==
=== Pool A ===
Pos	Team	P	W	D	L	F	A	+/-	BP	Pts
1	Queensland Reds Women	3	2	0	1	97	64	33	2	10
2	Western Force Women^{1}	3	0	3	0	17	17	0	0	6
3	Brumbies Women	3	1	0	2	46	48	-2	2	6

=== Pool B ===
Pos	Team	P	W	D	L	F	A	+/-	BP	Pts
1	NSW Waratahs Women^{1}	3	2	1	0	71	29	42	2	12
2	President's XV Women	3	1	1	1	41	84	-43	0	6
3	Melbourne Rebels Women^{1 2}	3	0	1	2	17	47	-30	1	3

^{1}Following Western Force Women's withdrawal from the competition, their remaining two matches were recorded as 0-0 draws.

^{2}Western Force Women were replaced by the Super W Select for the finals.

== Regular season ==
=== Round 1 ===
19 June 2021
03:30 pm

Queensland Reds Women	26–47	NSW Waratahs Women
Try: Smith 79'; Kaleti 71'; Cheatham 49'; Sekona 28'; Con: Lockhart 80+1', 72', 50'	Report	Try: Murphy 74'; Stewart 45', 39', 20', 13'; Vella 36'; Duck 6'; Con: Piliae 75'; McKenzie 46', 40', 37', 20', 7'

Bottomley Park
Referee: James Palmer

19 June 2021
05:00 pm

Brumbies Women	30–5	Melbourne Rebels Women
Try: Derera 80+1'; Wilson 47'; Palu 42'; Waihape-Andrews 30'; Con: Ryan 48', 32'; Pen: Ryan 40', 25'	Report	Try: Kareta 58'

Seiffert Oval
Referee: Madeline Putz

24 June 2021
04:00 pm

Western Force Women	17–17	President's XV Women
Try: Paul 58'; Barnes 11'; Pomare 7'; Con: Henry 59'	Report	Try: McCalman 67', 63'; Huriwai 35'; Con: Clay 68'

C.ex Coffs International Stadium

=== Round 2 ===
27 June 2021
01:00 pm

Brumbies Women	13–19	President's XV Women
Try: Derera 28', 18'; Pen: Ryan 40+1'	Report	Try: Huriwai 51'; Clay 5'; Nielson 2'; Con: Vallance 52', 3'

C.ex Coffs International Stadium

27 June 2021
03:00 pm

Melbourne Rebels Women	12–17	Queensland Reds Women
Try: Kawa 61'; Marsters 20'; Con: Cormick 22'	Report	Try: Ngatupuna 70'; Lopa 35'; Wong 16'; Con: Lockhart 72'

C.ex Coffs International Stadium

27 June 2021

NSW Waratahs Women	N/A (Cancelled)	Western Force Women

C.ex Coffs International Stadium

=== Round 3 ===
30 June 2021

Western Force Women	N/A (Cancelled)	Melbourne Rebels Women

C.ex Coffs International Stadium

30 June 2021
03:00 pm

Queensland Reds Women	54–5	President's XV Women
Try: Wright 75'; Brill 55'; Bass 49'; Lopa 39', 30'; Wong 18'; Brill 14'; Kreis 3'; Con: Lockhart 57', 56', 50', 30', 19', 15', 4'	Report	Try: Huriwai 58'

C.ex Coffs International Stadium

30 June 2021
05:00 pm

NSW Waratahs Women	24–3	Brumbies Women
Try: Stewart 50', 40+1'; McKenzie 21', 4'; Con: McKenzie 40+3', 6'	Report	Pen: Ryan 26'

C.ex Coffs International Stadium

== Finals ==
3 July 2021
11:00 am

Melbourne Rebels Women	8–10	Brumbies Women
Try: Ratu 31'; Pen: Cormick 78'	Report	Try: Hetaraka 65'; Con: Bishop 67'; Pen: Hetaraka 79'

C.ex Coffs International Stadium

3 July 2021
01:00 pm

President's XV Women	15–17	Super W Select
Try: Norman-Bell 47'; McCalman 10'; Con: Vallance 11'; Pen: Vallance 57'	Report	Try: McLaren 52'; Aho-Fangaloka 40+2'; Con: Cramer 53', 40+3'; Pen: Cramer 80'

C.ex Coffs International Stadium

3 July 2021
03:30 pm

NSW Waratahs Women	45–12	Queensland Reds Women
Try: Vella 75'; Chancellor 65'; Murphy 58'; McKenzie 48'; Vella 40'; Karpani 31'; Stewart 13'; Con: McKenzie 67', 60', 50', 40+1', 33'	Report	Try: Cheatham 55'; Patu 4'; Con: Lockhart 56'

C.ex Coffs International Stadium
