= Bitila Tawake =

Fiji international rugby union player

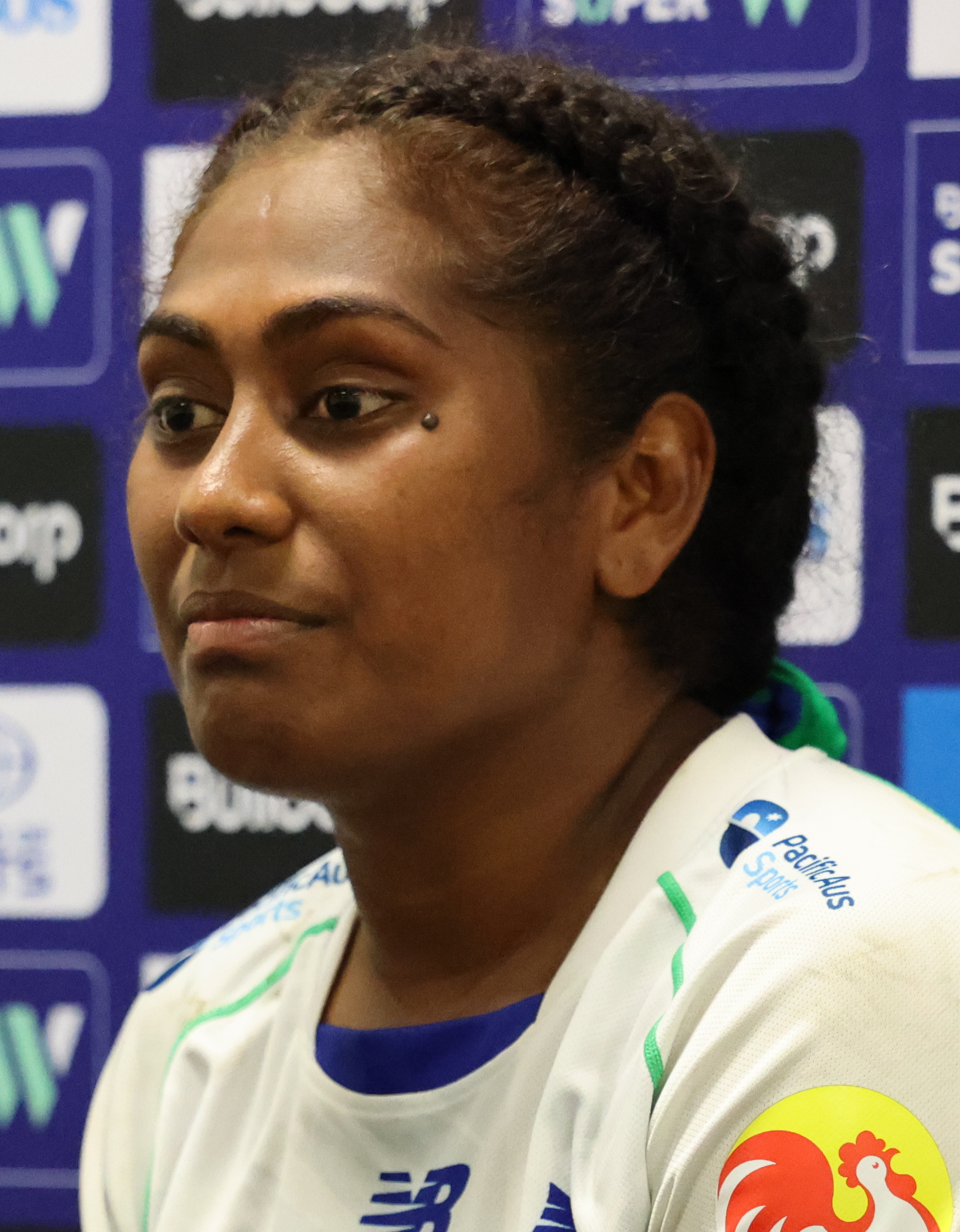
- Tawake in 2022
- Born: 2 April 1999 (age 27)
- Height: 172 cm (5 ft 8 in)

Rugby union career
- Position: Forward
Super Rugby
Years	Team	Apps	(Points)
2022–2023	Fijian Drua	6	(0)
2024	Chiefs Manawa	6	(0)
2025	Fijian Drua		(0)
International career
Years	Team	Apps	(Points)
2022–	Fiji	25	(20)

Bitila Tawake (born 2 April 1999) is a Fijian rugby union player. She competed for Fiji at the delayed 2021 Rugby World Cup. She also plays for the Fijiana Drua in the Super W competition.

== Early life ==
Tawake hails from Mualevu, Vanua Balavu in Lau and has maternal links to Nukuloa, Gau in Lomaiviti. She attended Veiuto Primary and Yat Sen Secondary. She has represented Fiji in basketball.

== Rugby career ==
In 2022, Tawake was named in the Fijiana Drua squad for their first Super W competition. She captained the Drua in their debut match against the Rebels. She also led them against the Waratahs in the Grand Final as they clinched their first title.

She was selected for the Fijiana squad for two test matches against Australia and Japan in May 2022. She only featured in the Japan test.

Tawake captained the Fijiana's at the 2022 Oceania Championship in New Zealand. She led her side in their record trouncing of Papua New Guinea. She then scored a try in their 34–7 win against Tonga. She also led the Fijiana's in their final matchup against Samoa. In September 2022, she played in a warm up match against Canada. She was also named in the Fijiana squad for the 2021 Rugby World Cup.

Tawake scored the Fijiana fifteens lone try in their test against the Wallaroos on 20 May 2023, her side lost 5–22. On 28 November, it was announced that she had joined Chiefs Manawa for the 2024 Super Rugby Aupiki season.

On 9 August 2025, she was named in the Fijiana side to the 2025 Women's Rugby World Cup in England.
