= New South Wales Waratahs Women =

- Union: Rugby Australia; New South Wales Rugby Union
- Founded: 2017; 9 years ago
- Location: Sydney, New South Wales, Australia
- Region: New South Wales
- Coach: Michael Ruthven
- Captain: Piper Duck
- League: Super W
- 2025: Champions (6th title)
1st kit	2nd kit

Official website
- waratahs.rugby

The New South Wales Waratahs Women are an Australian rugby union team that represents New South Wales in the Super Rugby Women's competition. They are the most successful team so far, having won five titles.

== History ==
=== Super W announced ===
In 2017, Rugby Australia announced that a national women's rugby competition would commence in March 2018, with the New South Wales Waratahs to have a women's team. The announcement was made on the same day that Rugby Australia outlined its intentions to bid for the 2021 Women's Rugby World Cup.

=== Inaugural season champions ===
The Waratahs Women were hosted by the Queensland Reds Women at Suncorp Stadium in Brisbane for the season's opener. It was a double header with the Super Rugby match between the Queensland Reds and the Bulls.

On 20 April 2018, the women's New South Wales Waratahs made history by winning the first season of women's 15-a-side rugby, with captain Ashleigh Hewson kicking the winning penalty goal in the ninety-second minute. New South Wales Waratahs Women's were victorious over the Queensland Reds 16–13 at Stadium Australia.

=== 2024 ===
The Waratahs Women went undefeated throughout the entire season before beating the Fijian Drua in the final to win their fifth Super Rugby title. Desiree Miller (rugby union) scored a hat-trick and Maya Stewart scored a double in their sides first title win since 2021.

== Current squad ==
On 29 January 2025, the squad for the 2025 Super Rugby Women's season was announced.

Waratahs Super W squad
**Props**: (Australia) **Bridie O'Gorman**; (Australia) **Emily Robinson**; (Australia) **Faliki Pohiva**; (Australia) Georgia Chapple; (Tonga) **Seneti Kilisimasi**; (Australia) Suisuiosalafai Volkman; **Hookers**: (Australia) **Adiana Talakai**; (Australia) Brittany Merlo; (Australia) Millie Parker; **Locks**: (Australia) **Annabelle Codey**; (Australia) **Atasi Lafai**; (Australia) Jayjay Taylor; (Australia) **Kaitlan Leaney**; (Australia) Tahlia Morgan	**Loose Forwards**: (Australia) **Emily Chancellor**; (Australia) **Leilani Nathan**; (Australia) **Piper Duck** (c); (Australia) **Ruby Anderson**; **Scrum-halves**: (Australia) Martha Harvey; (Australia) Tatum Bird; (Australia) Tiarne Cavanagh; **Fly-halves**: (Australia) **Arabella McKenzie**; (Australia) **Waiaria Ellis**	**Centres**: (Australia) **Georgina Friedrichs**; (Australia) Katrina Barker; (Australia) Jade Sheridan; (Australia) Nicole Nathan; **Outside Backs**: (Australia) Amelia Whitaker; (Australia) **Caitlyn Halse**; (Australia) **Desiree Miller**; (Australia) Jacinta Windsor; (Australia) **Maya Stewart**; (Australia) Sariah Paki
(c) Denotes team captain, **Bold** denotes internationally capped and ^{ST} indicated short-term cover.

== Season standings ==
Year	Position	Pld	W	D	L	F	A	+/-	BP	Pts	Play-offs
2025	1st	4	3	0	1	115	81	+34	3	15	Defeated Reds in final
2024	1st	5	5	0	0	224	88	+136	4	24	Defeated Fijiana Drua in final
2023	1st	5	5	0	0	158	48	+110	0	24	Defeated by Fijiana Drua in Semi-final
2022	2nd	5	4	0	1	185	70	+115	4	20	Defeated by Fijiana Drua in final
2021	1st (Pool A)	3	2	0	1	97	64	+33	2	10	Defeated Reds in final
2020	1st	4	4	0	0	131	21	+110	3	19	Playoffs cancelled due to COVID-19
2019	1st	4	4	0	0	138	24	+114	3	19	Defeated Reds in final
2018	1st	4	4	0	0	131	15	+116	2	18	Defeated Reds in final

== Coaching staff ==
- Head Coach: Michael Ruthven
- Assistant Coach: Sam Needs
- Assistant Coach: Shaun McCreedy
