= Fijian Drua Women =

Fijiana Drua
- Founded: 2022; 3 years ago
- Ground(s): Churchill Park (Capacity: 11,000); HFC Bank Stadium (Capacity: 15,000)
- Coach: Ifereimi Rawaqa
- Captain: Karalaini Naisewa
- League: Super Rugby Women's
- 2025: 3rd

Official website
- drua.rugby

The Fijiana Drua (known as the Rooster Chicken Fijiana Drua for sponsorship reasons) are a Fijian rugby union team based in Fiji. They compete in the Super Rugby Women's competition. They were crowned champions in their inaugural season in 2022, and successfully defended their title in 2023. The first official try to go into the history books for the Fijiana Drua Women's rugby team was scored by hooker Jiowana Bulaoca Sauto during their inaugural Super W match against the Melbourne Rebels on March 5, 2022, at Endeavour Hills Rugby Grounds.

== History ==
Rugby Australia announced in February 2022 that the Fijiana Drua had joined the Super W competition. The Fijiana Drua is the first Fijian team to join the competition with support from the Australian Government’s PacificAus Sports program. The Fiji Rugby Union announced that Rooster Chicken were the official sponsors of the Fijiana Drua for the 2022 Super W season.

Fijiana Drua won all matches of the 2022 Super W and claimed the title in their historic first season. They defeated the NSW Waratahs 32–26 in the final. In November 2022, the Fijiana Drua confirmed their participation for the 2023 Super W season with two home and three away round-robin matches.

The Fijiana Drua successfully defended their title for the 2023 Super W season, they defeated the Queensland Reds in the grand final 38–30.

=== Name Change and Management ===
On 8 December 2023, the team officially changed its name to Rooster Chicken Fijian Drua Women as they compete in the newly named Super Rugby Women's competition in 2024. It was announced that the team would now be fully administered by the management of Counter Ruck Ltd.

Mosese Rauluni was appointed as the new Head Coach for the side in January 2024.

=== 2025 ===
Former Flying Fijians lock, Ifereimi Rawaqa, was appointed as Interim Head Coach for the Rooster Chicken Fijian Drua Women for their 2025 Super Rugby Women's campaign.

== Current squad ==
On 28 January 2025, the squad for the 2025 Super Rugby Women's season was announced.

Fijiana Drua Super W squad
**Props**: (Fiji) **Salanieta Nabuli**; (Fiji) **Bitila Tawake**; (Fiji) **Loraini Senivutu**; (Fiji) **Vika Matarugu**; (Fiji) **Tiana Robanakadavu**; (Fiji) **Anasimeci Korovata**; **Hookers**: (Fiji) **Keleni Marawa**; (Fiji) Isabella Koi; **Locks**: (Fiji) **Mereoni Nakesa**; (Fiji) **Asinate Serevi**; (Fiji) **Merevesi Ofakimalino**	**Loose Forwards**: (Fiji) **Karalaini Naisewa** (c); (Fiji) **Nunia Daunimoala**; (Fiji) **Raijieli Daveua**; (Fiji) **Alfreda Fisher**; (Fiji) **Carletta Yee**; **Scrum-halves**: (Fiji) **Evivi Senikarivi**; (Fiji) Noelani Baselala; (Fiji) **Kolora Lomani**; **Fly-halves**: (Fiji) **Salanieta Kinita**; (Fiji) **Luisa Tisolo**; (Fiji) **Setaita Railumu**	**Centres**: (Fiji) **Josivini Neihamu**; (Fiji) **Alowesi Nakoci**; (Fiji) **Rusila Nagasau**; **Outside backs**: (Fiji) **Vitalina Naikore**; (Fiji) **Merewairita Naivosa**; (Fiji) **Ema Adivitaloga**; (Fiji) **Repeka Tove**; (Fiji) Imeri Nai
(cc) Denotes team co-captains, **Bold** denotes internationally capped and ^{ST} indicated short-term cover.

== Season standings ==
Super Rugby Women's

Year	Position	Pld	W	D	L	PF	PA	PD	Pts	Play-offs
2022	**Champion**	5	5	0	0	184	51	+133	**24**	Defeated NSW Waratahs in the final
2023	**Champion**	5	2	0	3	88	118	–30	**9**	Defeated Queensland Reds in the final
2024	**2nd**	5	3	0	2	113	129	−16	**13**	Defeated by NSW Waratahs in the final
2025	**3rd**	4	2	0	2	94	101	–7	**9**	Defeated by Queensland Reds in the semi-final

== Coach ==
Fijian Drua coaches by date, matches and win percentage*
Coach	Period	G	W	D	L	%
Senirusi Seruvakula	2022	5	5	0	0	100%
Inoke Male	2023	5	2	0	3	40%
Mosese Rauluni	2024	7	4	0	2	66.66%
Ifereimi Rawaqa	2025	5	2	0	3	40%
Totals (2022–present)^{*}		22	13	0	8	59.09%
Updated to: **6 April 2025**

Notes:

^* Official Super Rugby Women's competition matches only, including finals.

== See also ==
- Fijian Latui
- Fiji Warriors
- Fijian Drua
