= Super Rugby Women's =

Women's rugby union club competition in Australia

- Current season, competition or edition: 2026 Super Rugby Women's season
- Sport: Rugby union
- Founded: 2018; 8 years ago
- First season: 2018
- Administrator: Rugby Australia
- No. of teams: 5
- Countries: Australia (4 teams); Fiji (1 team)
- Most recent champion: New South Wales Waratahs (6th title) (2025)
- Most titles: New South Wales Waratahs (6 titles)
- Broadcasters: Nine Network; Stan Sport

Super Rugby Women's is an annual professional women's rugby union club competition organised by Rugby Australia. It is contested by four clubs from Australia and one club from Fiji, who play a single series of round-robin matches to determine the four participants of a single-elimination tournament. The competition replaced the representative National Women's Championship, with five teams owned by the Australian Super Rugby franchises, and began play in the 2018 season as an amateur league known as the Super W. The 2022 season saw the addition of a team from Fiji, and the introduction of salaries for players. The league adopted its current name in the 2024 season. The New South Wales Waratahs are the current champions (2025) and hold the most titles with six.

== History ==
The league commenced in the 2018 season as an amateur league. Buildcorp were named as the league's naming rights partner, while Gilbert were named as the official supplier of the league's rugby balls. For the inaugural season, the teams' playing lists were constructed from scratch throughout the later stages of 2018. Clubs were asked to nominate a list of desired players, with the Super W assigning two of these "marquee" players to each club. In addition, clubs were able to sign a number of players with existing connections to the club, or with arrangements for club sponsored work or study. In the 2019 season, the Western Force were replaced by a team representing RugbyWA.

The 2020 season was suspended following the fifth and final round of the regular season, due to lockdowns imposed by various state governments in late March, following the outbreak of COVID-19 in Australia. The planned playoff between the second-placed Reds and third-placed Brumbies, and the subsequent grand final, were cancelled in April; the first-placed Waratahs were declared champions once more. The Waratahs would finish a fourth straight undefeated season in 2021, which was played almost entirely at Coffs Harbour International Stadium in a pool format, and featured the temporary addition of a "President's XV" team composed of players from New South Wales and Queensland. The Western Force returned to the league, but withdrew after the first round to avoid the continuing COVID-19 pandemic in New South Wales.

On 2 October 2024, Rugby Australia confirmed that the Melbourne Rebels will not compete in the Super Rugby Women's competition in 2025, with Rugby Australia stating that an investigation into the viability of maintaining the Rebels women's program did not identify a financially viable option for either Rugby Australia or Rugby Victoria to sustain the program in 2025.

=== New format ===
In 2026, the season will now take place in June through to August, it will maintain the five-round format, which will be followed by a full finals series, and the cross-over match against the winner of New Zealand's Super Rugby Aupiki competition for the Women's Super Rugby Champions Final.

== Teams ==
Five Super Rugby franchises, including five from Australia and one from Fiji, will field teams in the 2025 season of Super Rugby Women's. Players in the competition are required to be seventeen years of age or older.

List of Super Rugby Women's clubs (2025)
Team	Location	Home ground	Cap.	First
ACT Brumbies	Canberra	Canberra Stadium	25,011	2018
ACT Brumbies	Canberra	Viking Park	7,000	2018
Fijian Drua	Lautoka	Churchill Park	10,000	2022
New South Wales Waratahs	Sydney	Leichhardt Oval	20,000	2018
New South Wales Waratahs	Sydney	Sydney Football Stadium	45,000	2018
Queensland Reds	Brisbane	Ballymore Stadium	8,000	2018
Western Force	Perth	Perth Rectangular Stadium	20,500	2018

== Champions ==
Season	Champions	Final	Runners-up
2018	NSW Waratahs	16–13	Queensland Reds
2019	NSW Waratahs	8–5	Queensland Reds
2020	NSW Waratahs	—N/a (Note: The 2020 Final was cancelled due to the COVID-19 pandemic in Australia, and the Waratahs were declared the winner.)	Queensland Reds
2021	NSW Waratahs	45–12	Queensland Reds
2022	Fijiana Drua	32–26	NSW Waratahs
2023	Fijiana Drua	38–30	Queensland Reds
2024	NSW Waratahs	50–14	Fijiana Drua
2025	NSW Waratahs	43–21	Queensland Reds
2026	NSW Waratahs	34–17	Fijiana Drua

=== Summary of winners ===
#	Team	Champions	Years as champions	Runners-up	Years as runners-up
1	NSW Waratahs	7	2018, 2019, 2020, 2021, 2024, 2025, 2026	1	2022
2	Fijiana Drua	2	2022, 2023	2	2024, 2026

== Broadcasting ==
During the 2020 season all matches were televised live by affiliate partners Fox Sports. Following Rugby Australia's broadcast deal with Nine Network, all games will be broadcast on streaming service Stan Sport, with one game a round being simulcast on Nine's flagship free to air channel. All matches are streamed live by Stan Sport.

== See also ==
- Super Rugby AUS
