= 2026 women's rugby union internationals =

List of international rugby games

Outside of 2026 WXV, the 2026 Women's Six Nations Championship and other regional tournaments, a series of international matches will be played throughout the year.

== March ==
1 March 2026
12:00 CET (UTC+1)

Poland	7–26	Czech Republic
	Report

Ruda Śląska, Poland
Referee: Filip Kuniczkowski (Poland)

27 March 2026
16:55 AEST (UTC+10)

Australia	33–15	Fiji
Try: Ledington 13' c O’Gorman 25' c Palu 46' c Stewart 60' c Miller 79' m Con: Wood (4/5) 14', 26', 47', 60'	Report	Try: Yee 35' c Neihamu 49' m Con: Vueti (1/2) 36'; Pen: Vueti 30'

Canberra Stadium, Canberra
Referee: Amber McLachlan (Australia)

Notes:

- Silika Qalo, Zipporah Sorokacika, Keri Lawavou and Vika Nakacia (all Fiji) and Nicole Ledington, Sidney Taylor, Lily Bone and Piper Simons (all Australia) made their international debut.

== June ==
16 June 2026
13:00 SAST (UTC+2)

Limpopo Ladies (South Africa)	5–99	Zimbabwe
	Report

Phamale Sport Village, Nylstroom

19 June 2026
17:30 SAST (UTC+2)

Bulls Daisies (South Africa)	19–0	Zimbabwe
	Report

Naka Bulls Stadium, Pretoria

27 June 2026
17:00 BST (UTC+1)

Barbarians	17–34	Wales
Try: Rule; Cleall; Quansah; Con: Peña	Report	Try: Powell; Williams (2); Lockwood; Keight; Aiono; Con: Powell (2)

Twickenham Stadium, London
Referee: Nikki O'Donnell (England)

Team details

FB	15	(Australia) Lori Cramer
RW	14	(New Zealand) Ruby Tui
OC	13	(Spain) Clàudia Peña
IC	12	(Canada) Alex Tessier
LW	11	(England) Rachel Lund
FH	10	(New Zealand) Liv McGoverne
SH	9	(Scotland) Caity Mattinson
N8	8	(England) Rownita Marston-Mulhearn
OF	7	(Australia) Emily Chancellor (c)
BF	6	(New Zealand) Amy Rule
RL	5	(England) Sarah Bonar
LL	4	(England) Poppy Leitch
TP	3	(Scotland) Christine Belisle
HK	2	(Wales) Carys Phillips
LP	1	(Spain) Laura Delgado Dueñas
Replacements:
HK	16	(Canada) Emily Tuttosi
PR	17	(England) Bryony Cleall
PR	18	(United States) Charli Jacoby
LK	19	(England) Amelia Buckland-Hurry
FL	20	(Italy) Ilaria Arrighetti
SH	21	(Scotland) Jenny Maxwell
CE	22	(England) Lagi Tuima
WG	23	(England) Celia Quansah
Coach:
(England) Susie Appleby

FB	15	Nel Metcalfe
RW	14	Kelsie Webster
OC	13	Amy Williams
IC	12	Courtney Keight
LW	11	Jenna De Vera
FH	10	Kayleigh Powell
SH	9	Seren Lockwood
N8	8	Bryonie King
OF	7	Alex Callender (c)
BF	6	Alisha Joyce-Butchers
RL	5	Jorja Aiono
LL	4	Branwen Metcalfe
TP	3	Sisilia Tuipulotu
HK	2	Molly Reardon
LP	1	Maisie Davies
Replacements:
HK	16	Kelsey Jones
PR	17	Katherine Baverstock
PR	18	Stella Orrin
LK	19	Alaw Pyrs
LK	20	Lucy Isaac
BR	21	Lily Hawkins
SH	22	Keira Bevan
WG	23	Freya Bell
Coach:
(Wales) Sean Lynn

Player of the Match:
Bryonie King (Wales)

Assistant referees:
Emily Hope (England)
Rebecca Piddlesden (England)
Television match official:
Craig Maxwell-Keys (England)

== July ==
4 July 2026
13:30 SAST (UTC+2)

South Africa	34–21	United States
Try: Malinga 4' c Tose 11' m Latsha 19' m Welman (2) 31' m, 42' c Ubisi 41' m Con: Cilliers (2/6) 5', 43'	Report	Try: Tafuna 61' c Cowdrey 69' c Cook 80' c Con: Vogel (3/3) 62', 70', 80'

Ellis Park Stadium, Johannesburg
Referee: Zoe Naude (South Africa)

Team details

FB	15	Byrhandré Dolf
RW	14	Jakkie Cilliers	(substituted off) 77'
OC	13	Ayanda Malinga
IC	12	Aphiwe Ngwevu	(substituted on) 54'
LW	11	Alichia Arries
FH	10	Libbie Janse van Rensburg
SH	9	Unam Tose	(substituted on) 58'
N8	8	Logan Welman
OF	7	Catha Jacobs
BF	6	Sizophila Solontsi	(substituted off) 68'
RL	5	Danelle Lochner
LL	4	Vainah Ubisi	(substituted off) 70'
TP	3	Babalwa Latsha (c)	(substituted off) 53'
HK	2	Micke Günter	(substituted off) 53'
LP	1	Sanelisiwe Charlie	(substituted off) 53'
Replacements:
HK	16	Anushka Groenewald	(substituted on) 53'
PR	17	Yonela Ngxingolo	(substituted on) 53'
PR	18	Thandile Mazwi	(substituted on) 53'
LK	19	Anathi Qolo	(substituted on) 70'
LK	20	Sinelitha Noxeke	(substituted on) 77'
BR	21	Faith Tshauke	(substituted on) 68'
SH	22	Felicia Jacobs	(substituted on) 58'
WG	23	Eloise Webb	(substituted on) 54'
Coach: (South Africa) Swys de Bruin

FB	15	Alev Kelter	(substituted off) 63'
RW	14	Bulou Mataitoga
OC	13	Telesi Uhatafe
IC	12	Katana Howard	(substituted off) 45'
LW	11	Ashley Cowdrey
FH	10	Bella Vogel
SH	9	Cassidy Bargell	(yellow card) 30'	(substituted off) 45'
N8	8	Freda Tafuna
OF	7	Georgie Perris-Redding (c)
BF	6	Kate Zackary	(substituted off) 45'
RL	5	Hallie Taufo'ou	(substituted off) 55'
LL	4	Rachel Ehrecke
TP	3	Reece Woods	(substituted off) 41'
HK	2	Kathryn Treder	(substituted off) 60'
LP	1	Hope Rogers	(substituted off) 60'
Replacements:
HK	16	Paige Stathopoulos	(substituted on) 60'
PR	17	Alivia Leatherman	(substituted on) 60'
PR	18	Elizabeth Cook	(substituted on) 41'
LK	19	Kapoina Bailey	(substituted on) 55'
LK	20	Tessa Hann	(substituted on) 45'
BR	21	Hann Humphreys	(substituted on) 45'
SH	22	Olivia Ortiz	(substituted on) 45'
WG	23	Kristin Bitter	(substituted on) 63'
Coach: (Republic of Ireland) Jack Hanratty

Player of the Match:
Catha Jacobs (South Africa)

Assistant referees:
Giana Viljoen (South Africa)
Angie Bezuidenhout (South Africa)
Television match official:
Quinton Immelman (South Africa)

11 July 2026
13:30 SAST (UTC+2)

South Africa	19–26	United States
Try: Arries 27'c Günter 34' m Malinga 64' c Con: Cilliers (2/3) 28', 65'	Report	Try: Rogers (2) 21' c, 30' c Uhatafe (2) 41' c, 65' m Con: Vogel (3/4) 22', 31', 42'

Loftus Versfeld Stadium, Pretoria
Referee: Zoe Naude (South Africa)

Team details

FB	15	Eloise Webb
RW	14	Jakkie Cilliers
OC	13	Ayanda Malinga
IC	12	Aphiwe Ngwevu	(substituted off) 61'
LW	11	Alichia Arries
FH	10	Libbie Janse van Rensburg
SH	9	Unam Tose	(substituted off) 61'
N8	8	Logan Welman	(yellow card) 48'
OF	7	Catha Jacobs	(substituted off) 61'
BF	6	Sizophila Solontsi	(substituted off) 61'
RL	5	Danelle Lochner	(substituted off) 61'
LL	4	Vainah Ubisi
TP	3	Babalwa Latsha (c)	(substituted off) 50'
HK	2	Micke Günter	(substituted off) 50'
LP	1	Sanelisiwe Charlie	(substituted off) 50'
Replacements:
HK	16	Anushka Groenewald	(substituted on) 50'
PR	17	Yonela Ngxingolo	(substituted on) 50'
PR	18	Nombuyekezo Mdliki	(substituted on) 50'
LK	19	Nomsa Mokwai	(substituted on) 61'
LK	20	Lerato Makua	(substituted on) 61'
BR	21	Sinelitha Noxeke	(substituted on) 61'
SH	22	Anacadia Minnaar	(substituted on) 61'
WG	23	Maceala Samboya	(substituted on) 61'
Coach: (South Africa) Swys de Bruin

FB	15	Ashley Cowdrey
RW	14	Bulou Mataitoga	(substituted off) 56'
OC	13	Tessa Hann
IC	12	Bella Vogel
LW	11	Telesi Uhatafe
FH	10	Kristin Bitter	(substituted off) 70'
SH	9	Olivia Ortiz	(substituted off) 40'
N8	8	Freda Tafuna
OF	7	Georgie Perris-Redding (c)
BF	6	Hann Humphreys	(substituted off) 55'
RL	5	Hallie Taufo'ou
LL	4	Emerson Allen	(substituted off) 40'
TP	3	Elizabeth Cook	(substituted off) 21'
HK	2	Kathryn Treder	(substituted off) 79'
LP	1	Hope Rogers
Replacements:
HK	16	Chloe Hill-Huse	(substituted on) 79'
PR	17	Alivia Leatherman	(substituted on) 63'
PR	18	Reece Woods	(substituted on) 21'	(substituted off) 63'
LK	19	Rachel Ehrecke	(substituted on) 40'
LK	20	Kapoina Bailey	(substituted on) 55'
BR	21	Taina Tukuafu	(substituted on) 40'
SH	22	Katana Howard	(substituted on) 70'
WG	23	Alev Kelter	(substituted on) 56'
Coach: (Republic of Ireland) Jack Hanratty

Player of the Match:
Freda Tafuna (USA)

Assistant referees:
Giana Viljoen (South Africa)
Angie Bezuidenhout (South Africa)
Television match official:
Quinton Immelman (South Africa)

== August ==
8 August 2026
14:14 FJT (UTC+12)

Fiji	12–55	South Africa
Try: Buleki 25' c Qoro 41' m Con: Vueti (1/2) 26'	Report	Try: Khuzwayo (2) 9' m, 46' c Mdliki 17' m Gwala 23' m Ubisi 28' c Solontsi 39' m Samboya 50' c Dolf 69' c Noxeke 77' c Con: Janse van Rensburg (1) 29', 70'; Dolf (4) 47', 50', 78'

HFC Bank Stadium, Suva
Referee: Jess Ling (Australia)

Team details

FB	15	Litiana Vueti
RW	14	Vani Buleki
OC	13	Merewairita Neivoha	(substituted off) 65'
IC	12	Ruth Raketekete
LW	11	Repeka Tove	(substituted off) 65'
FH	10	Varanisese Qoro
SH	9	Kolora Lomani (c)	(substituted off) 65'
N8	8	Alfreda Fisher	(red card) 46'
OF	7	Adi Salaseini Railumu	(substituted off) 65'
BF	6	Nunia Daunimoala
RL	5	Karavaki Lutumaibau	(substituted off) 51'
LL	4	Mereoni Nakesa
TP	3	Tiana Robanakadavu	(substituted off) 40'
HK	2	Bitila Tawake	(substituted off) 70'
LP	1	Karalaini Naisewa	(substituted off) 70'
Replacements:
HK	16	Selai Naliva	(substituted on) 70'
PR	17	Elesi Saukuru	(substituted on) 70'
PR	18	Keri Lawavou	(substituted on) 40'
LK	19	Vilisi Tivalele	(substituted on) 65'
LK	20	Jade Coates	(substituted on) 51'
BR	21	Evivi Senikarivi	(substituted on) 65'
SH	22	Ivamere Nabura	(substituted on) 65'
WG	23	Aqela Raitubu	(substituted on) 65'
Coach: (Wales) Ioan Cunningham

FB	15	Byrhandré Dolf
RW	14	Maceala Samboya
OC	13	Zintle Mpupha
IC	12	Shiniqwa Lamprecht	(substituted off) 65'
LW	11	Patience Mokone
FH	10	Libbie Janse van Rensburg (c)
SH	9	Anacadia Minnaar	(substituted off) 65'
N8	8	Aseza Hele
OF	7	Lerato Makua	(substituted off) 31'
BF	6	Sizophila Solontsi	(substituted off) 55'
RL	5	Nomsa Mokwai
LL	4	Vainah Ubisi	(substituted off) 55'
TP	3	Nombuyekezo Mdliki	(substituted off) 55'
HK	2	Lindelwa Gwala	(substituted off) 65'
LP	1	Xoliswa Khuzwayo	(substituted off) 55'
Replacements:
HK	16	Anushka Groenewald	(substituted on) 65'
PR	17	Yonela Ngxingolo	(substituted on) 55'
PR	18	Thandile Mazwi	(substituted on) 55'
LK	19	Catha Jacobs	(substituted on) 31'
LK	20	Sinelitha Noxeke	(substituted on) 55'
BR	21	Nobuhle Mjwara	(substituted on) 55'
SH	22	Felicia Jacobs	(substituted on) 65'
WG	23	Alichia Arries	(substituted on) 65'
Coach: (South Africa) Laurian Johannes-Haupt

Assistant referees:
Amber McLachlan (Australia)
Erin Doherty (New Zealand)
Television match official:
Graham Cooper (Australia)

Notes:

- Vani Buleki and Ruth Raketekete (both Fiji) made their international debut.
- The Ubuntu–Bula Trophy is a newly created rugby prize played between the Springbok Women and the Fijiana XV.

8 August 2026
15:00 BRT (UTC-03)

Brazil	7–19	USA Falcons
Try: Fioravanti; Con: Kochhann (1)	Report	Try: Wilkins; Brody; Russell; Con: Vogel (2)

Estádio Nicolau Alayon, São Paulo
Referee: Taís Balconi (Brazil)

Team details

FB	15	Fernanda Tenório
RW	14	Lohana Valente
OC	13	Carolyne Pereira
IC	12	Rafaela Zanellato
LW	11	Thalita Costa
FH	10	Raquel Kochhann
SH	9	Luiza Campos (c)
N8	8	Mariana Moreira
OF	7	Marina Fioravanti
BF	6	Milena Mariano
RL	5	Marcelle Souza
LL	4	Mariana Neves
TP	3	Giovana Mamede
HK	2	Júlia Leni
LP	1	Samara Vergara
Replacements:
HK	16	Patrícia Lima
PR	17	Juliana Silva
PR	18	Franciele Barros
LK	19	Giovanna Barth
LK	20	Larissa Carvalho
BR	21	Eshyllen Coimbra
SH	22	Gisele Gomes
WG	23	Leila Silva
Coach: (Brazil) Guilherme Coghetto

FB	15	Karina Gauto
RW	14	Alopa Nau
OC	13	Tessa Hann
IC	12	Hehea Pulotu
LW	11	Makayla Wilkins
FH	10	Bella Vogel
SH	9	Abigail Paton
N8	8	Tahlia Brody
OF	7	Kennedy Feasby
BF	6	Lissa Salisbury
RL	5	Cindy Taulava
LL	4	Malia Isaacs
TP	3	Reece Woods (c)
HK	2	Chloe Hill-Huse
LP	1	Lauryn Carlton
Replacements:
HK	16	Sam Brackett
PR	17	Jordynn LeBeau
PR	18	Reece Moody
LK	19	Courtney Taylor
LK	20	Sayler Russell
BR	21	Sadie Schier
SH	22	Tiahna Padilla
WG	23	Nina Mason
Coach: (Fiji) Orlando Pulou

Assistant referees:
Letícia Martins (Brazil)
Erika Weiss (Brazil)

12 August 2026
15:00 BRT (UTC-03)

Brazil	14–12	USA Falcons
Try: Carvalho; Leni; Con: Valente (2)	Report	Try: Freeman; Walker; Con: Vogel (1)

Estádio Nicolau Alayon São Paulo
Referee: Erika Weiss (Brazil)

14 August 2026
15:30 NZT (UTC+12)

New Zealand	62–19	Black Ferns XV
	Report

Maidstone Park, Upper Hutt

Team details

FB	15	Braxton Sorensen-McGee
RW	14	Mererangi Paul
OC	13	Amy du Plessis
IC	12	Alena Saili
LW	11	Ayesha Leti-I’iga
FH	10	Ruahei Demant
SH	9	Tara Turner
N8	8	Liana Mikaele-Tu’u
OF	7	Elinor-Plum King
BF	6	Mia Anderson
RL	5	Laura Bayfield
LL	4	Maiakawanakaulani Roos
TP	3	Veisinia Mahutariki-Fakalelu
HK	2	Georgia Ponsonby
LP	1	Chryss Viliko
Replacements:
HK	16	Vici-Rose Green
PR	17	Ngano Tavake
PR	18	Santo Taumata
LK	19	Amarante Sititi
LK	20	Maama Mo'onia Vaipulu
BR	21	Maia Davis
SH	22	Maia Joseph
WG	23	Sylvia Brunt
	24	Justine McGregor
	25	Shyrah Tuliau-Tua’a
Coach: (New Zealand) Whitney Hansen

FB	15	Presayus Singh
RW	14	Winnie Palamo
OC	13	Hollyrae Mete-Renata
IC	12	Grace Brooker
LW	11	Wikitoria Viljoen
FH	10	Arene Landon-Lane
SH	9	Ariana Bayler
N8	8	Sarah Jones
OF	7	Taufa Bason
BF	6	Leata Puni-Lio
RL	5	Paris Lokotui
LL	4	Sam Taylor
TP	3	Mo’omo’oga Palu
HK	2	Natalie Delamere
LP	1	Angel Mulu
Replacements:
HK	16	Holly Wratt-Groeneweg
PR	17	Maddison Robinson
PR	18	Amber Mundell
LK	19	Cilia-Marie Po’e-Tofaeono
LK	20	Lonita Ngalu-Lavemai
BR	21	Emma Dermody
SH	22	Danny-Elle Fesolai
WG	23	Tafito Lafaele
	24	Kelsyn McCook
	25	Kokako Raki
	26	Hinemairingi Scott
	27	Lialanie Muamua
Coach: (New Zealand) Blair Baxter

15 August 2026
14:15 FJT (UTC+12)

Fiji	22–29	South Africa
Try: Buna 3' m Buleki 28' m Nailolo 58' c Rokowati 72' m Con: Qoro (1/4) 59'	Report	Try: Gwala 17' m Tshiremba (3) 43' c, 54' m, 76' m Ubisi 66' c Con: Dolf (2/5) 44', 66'

Churchill Park, Lautoka
Referee: Amber McLaughlan (Australia)

Team details

FB	15	Litiana Vueti	(substituted off) 57'
RW	14	Vani Buleki	(yellow card) 77'
OC	13	Ivamere Rokowati
IC	12	Ruth Raketekete	(substituted off) 71'
LW	11	Atelaite Buna
FH	10	Varanisese Qoro
SH	9	Kolora Lomani (c)	(substituted off) 71'
N8	8	Salaseini Railumu	(substituted off) 57'
OF	7	Merewairita Neivoна
BF	6	Nunia Daunimoala
RL	5	Jade Coates
LL	4	Karavaki Lutumaibau	(substituted off) 71'
TP	3	Keri Lawavou	(substituted off) 31'
HK	2	Bitila Tawake	(substituted off) 49'
LP	1	Karalaini Naisewa	(yellow card) 53'	(substituted off) 65'
Replacements:
HK	16	Selai Naliva	(substituted on) 49'
PR	17	Elesi Saukuru	(substituted on) 57'
PR	18	Tiana Robanakadavu	(substituted on) 31'
LK	19	Vilisi Tivalele	(substituted on) 71'
LK	20	Sereana Maragi	(substituted on) 65'
BR	21	Evivi Senikarivi	(substituted on) 71'
SH	22	Salote Nailolo	(substituted on) 57'
WG	23	Vasemaca Duva	(substituted on) 71'
Coach: (Wales) Ioan Cunningham

FB	15	Byrhandré Dolf
RW	14	Alichia Arries
OC	13	Maceala Samboya	(substituted off) 64'
IC	12	Zintle Mpupha	(yellow card) 28'
LW	11	Maria Tshiremba
FH	10	Libbie Janse van Rensburg	(substituted off) 71'
SH	9	Anacadia Minnaar	(yellow card) 31'	(substituted off) 52'
N8	8	Aseza Hele	(substituted off) 62'
OF	7	Catha Jacobs
BF	6	Sizophila Solontsi
RL	5	Nomsa Mokwai
LL	4	Vainah Ubisi	(substituted off) 73'
TP	3	Babalwa Latsha (c)	(substituted off) 62'
HK	2	Lindelwa Gwala	(substituted off) 73'
LP	1	Xoliswa Khuzwayo	(substituted off) 52'		(substituted on) 76'
Replacements:
HK	16	Anushka Groenewald}	(substituted on) 73'
PR	17	Yonela Ngxingolo	(substituted on) 52'	(substituted off) 76'
PR	18	Nombuyekezo Mdliki	(substituted on) 62'
LK	19	Sinelitha Noxeke	(substituted on) 73'
LK	20	Nobuhle Mjwara	(substituted on) 62'
BR	21	Shiniqwa Lamprecht	(substituted on) 71'
SH	22	Felicia Jacobs	(substituted on) 52'
WG	23	Patience Mokone	(substituted on) 64'
Coach: (South Africa) Laurian Johannes-Haupt

Assistant referees:
Jess Ling (Australia)
Chloe Sampson (New Zealand)
Television match official:
Rachel Horton (Australia)

Notes:

- Maria Tshiremba (South Africa) and Sereana Maragi and Vasemaca Duva (both Fiji) made their international debut.

22 August 2026
15:05 NZST (UTC+12)

New Zealand	66–19	Australia
Try: Sorensen-McGee 4' c Viliko 14' c Demant 24' c Mikaele-Tu'u 35' m Roos 43' c Leti-I'iga 50' c Green 56' c Joseph 61' c Tuliau-Tua'a 64' m Sititi 76' c Con: Sorensen-McGee (8/10) 4', 14', 24', 44', 51', 57', 62', 77'	Report	Try: Miller 40+2' c Ellis 67' c Merlo 73' m Con: Miller (2/3) 40+3', 68'

Mount Smart Stadium, Auckland
Referee: Maggie Cogger-Orr (New Zealand)

Team details

FB	15	Braxton Sorensen-McGee
RW	14	Mererangi Paul
OC	13	Amy du Plessis
IC	12	Sylvia Brunt
LW	11	Ayesha Leti-I'iga
FH	10	Ruahei Demant (c)
SH	9	Maia Joseph
N8	8	Kaipo Olsen-Baker
OF	7	Elinor-Plum King
BF	6	Liana Mikaele-Tu'u
RL	5	Ma'ama Mo'onia Vaipulu
LL	4	Maia Roos
TP	3	Veisinia Mahutariki-Fakalelu
HK	2	Georgia Ponsonby
LP	1	Chryss Viliko
Replacements:
HK	16	Vici-Rose Green
PR	17	Maddison Robinson
PR	18	Santo Taumata
LK	19	Amarante Sititi
LK	20	Mia Anderson
BR	21	Ariana Bayler
SH	22	Hannah King
WG	23	Shyrah Tuliau-Tua'a
Coach:
(New Zealand) Whitney Hansen

FB	15	Faitala Moleka
RW	14	Maya Stewart
OC	13	Alysia Lefau-Fakaosilea
IC	12	Cecilia Smith
LW	11	Desiree Miller
FH	10	Waiaria Ellis
SH	9	Tia Hinds
N8	8	Piper Duck
OF	7	Lily Bone
BF	6	Siokapesi Palu (c)
RL	5	Michaela Leonard
LL	4	Kaitlan Leaney
TP	3	Eva Karpani
HK	2	Tania Naden
LP	1	Brianna Hoy
Replacements:
HK	16	Brittany Merlo
PR	17	Allana Sikimeti
PR	18	Bridie O'Gorman
LK	19	Pia Tapsell
LK	20	Emily Chancellor
BR	21	Samantha Wood
SH	22	Bienne Terita
WG	23	Maddison Levi
Coach:
(Australia) Sam Needs

Assistant referees:
Jess Ling (Australia)
Chloe Sampson (New Zealand)
Television match official:
Rachel Horton (Australia)

Notes:

- Elinor-Plum King, Amarante Sititi and Shyrah Tuliau-Tua'a (all New Zealand) and Maddison Levi (Australia) made their international debut.

24 August 2026
20:00 BRT (UTC-03)

Brazil	34–12	South Africa A
Try: Moreira; Valente; Carvalho; Costa; Leni; Campos; Con: Valente (2)	Report	Try: Mayitshe; Hardneck; Con: Zulu (1)

Estádio Nicolau Alayon, São Paulo
Referee: Erika Weiss (Brazil)

29 August 2026
14:00 CEST (UTC+2)

Netherlands	33–0	Scotland A
	Report

NRCA Stadium, Amsterdam

30 August 2026
15:00 BRT (UTC-03)

Brazil	29–19	South Africa A
Try: Pereira; Freitas (3); Braz; Con: Tenoria (1)P; Kochhann (1)	Report	Try: Vakalisa; Nel (2); Con: Zulu (2)

Estádio Nicolau Alayon, São Paulo

== September ==
4 September 2026
17:00 JST (UTC+09)

Japan	12–15	Fiji
Try: Asari 28' c Kuge 57' m Con: Nishi (1/2) 29'	Report	Try: Rokowati 9' m Qoro 21' m Raitubu 51' m

Japan Base, Fukuoka
Referee: Ella Goldsmith (Australia)

5 September 2026
13:30 SAST (UTC+2)

South Africa	20–52	New Zealand
Try: Gwala 13' m Ngwevu 30' m Ubisi 48' m, 81' m Con: Dolf (0/4)	Report	Try: E. King 2' m, 57' c Sorensen-McGee 10' c, 42' m Viliko 37' c Joseph 51' c Sititi 73' c Vaipulu 75' c Con: H. King (1/2) 11'; Sorensen-McGee (5/6) 38', 52', 57', 74', 76'

FNB Stadium, Johannesburg
Referee: Zoe Naude (South Africa)

Team details

FB	15	Byrhandré Dolf
RW	14	Alichia Arries
OC	13	Zintle Mpupha	(substituted off) 38'
IC	12	Aphiwe Ngwevu	(substituted off) 52'
LW	11	Ayanda Malinga
FH	10	Libbie Janse van Rensburg
SH	9	Unam Tose	(substituted off) 58'
N8	8	Aseza Hele	(substituted off) 45'
OF	7	Catha Jacobs
BF	6	Sizophila Solontsi
RL	5	Danelle Lochner	(substituted off) 58'
LL	4	Vainah Ubisi
TP	3	Babalwa Latsha (c)	(substituted off) 58'
HK	2	Lindelwa Gwala	(substituted off) 45'
LP	1	Sanelisiwe Charlie	(substituted off) 45'
Replacements:
HK	16	Anushka Groenewald	(substituted on) 45'
PR	17	Yonela Ngxingolo	(substituted on) 45'
PR	18	Nombuyekezo Mdliki	(substituted on) 58'
LK	19	Nomsa Mokwai	(substituted on) 58'
LK	20	Shiniqwa Lamprecht	(substituted on) 52'
BR	21	Logan Welman	(substituted on) 45'
SH	22	Anacadia Minnaar	(substituted on) 58'
WG	23	Maceala Samboya	(substituted on) 38'
Coach:
(South Africa) Laurian Johannes-Haupt
(South Africa) Franzel September

FB	15	Braxton Sorensen-McGee
RW	14	Mererangi Paul	(yellow card) 28'
OC	13	Amy du Plessis		(substituted off) 61'
IC	12	Sylvia Brunt		(substituted off) 71'
LW	11	Ayesha Leti-I'iga	(yellow card) 49'
FH	10	Hannah King
SH	9	Maia Joseph		(substituted off) 57'
N8	8	Liana Mikaele-Tu'u		(substituted off) 67'
OF	7	Elinor-Plum King
BF	6	Mia Anderson
RL	5	Ma'ama Mo'onia Vaipulu
LL	4	Maiakawanakaulani Roos		(substituted off) 65'
TP	3	Veisinia Mahutariki-Fakalelu		(substituted off) 61'
HK	2	Georgia Ponsonby (c)	(yellow card) 48'	(substituted off) 57'
LP	1	Chryss Viliko		(substituted off) 50'
Replacements:
HK	16	Atlanta Lolohea	(substituted on) 57'
PR	17	Maddison Robinson	(substituted on) 50'
PR	18	Santo Taumata	(substituted on) 61'
LK	19	Laura Bayfield	(substituted on) 65'
LK	20	Amarante Sititi	(substituted on) 67'
BR	21	Tara Turner	(substituted on) 57'
SH	22	Ruahei Demant	(substituted on) 71'
WG	23	Justine McGregor	(substituted on) 61'
Coach:
(New Zealand) Whitney Hansen

Player of the Match:
Elinor-Plum King (New Zealand)

Assistant referees:
Giana Viljoen (South Africa)
Angie Bezuidenhout (South Africa)
Quinton Immelman (South Africa)

== October ==
3 October 2026
14:00 IST (UTC+1)

Ireland	43–19	Japan
Try: Cahill 11' c Hogan 25' m Jones 34' m McGann 38' m Parsons 42' c McInerney 65' c Barrett 81' c Con: O'Brien (2/5) 12', 43'; Breen (2/2) 66', 82'	Report	Try: Korai 5' c Asari 47' c Nagata 55' m Con: Nishi (2/3) 6', 47'

Musgrave Park, Cork
Referee: Clara Munarini (Italy)

18 October 2026
16:00 CLT (UTC−3)

Chile	39–10	Mexico
Try: Michelle González 13' m Beatriz Araneda 23' m Nahit Maureira 42' c Francisca Gallardo 60' m, 76' c Camila Igor 79' c Con: Catalina Villarroel (1/3) 43'; Carolina Alfaro (2/3) 77', 80'; Pen: Catalina Villarroel 45'	Report	Try: Isabela González 9' m Laura Estefany Rodríguez de los Reyes 72' m

Centro de Alto Rendimiento del Rugby, La Reina

24 October 2026
16:00 CLT (UTC−3)

Chile	19–28	Colombia
Try: Karcia Wyss 9'; Catalina Miranda 22'; Paz Cortes 36'; Con: Carolina Alfaro (2/3) 10', 37'	Report	Try: Heidy Acalo 26'; Karen Serna 32'; Zuleyma Orobio Cundumi 45'; Daniela Alzate 53'; Con: Valentina Tapias (4/4) 27', 33', 46', 54'

Centro de Alto Rendimiento del Rugby, La Reina
Referee: Nerea Livoni (Argentina)

== November ==
21 November 2026
14:00 HKT (UTC+8)

Hong Kong China	34–24	Tonga
	Report

Kai Tak Youth Sports Ground, Hong Kong
Referee: Erin Doherty (New Zealand)

21 November 2026
14:00 (CET) UTC+1

Switzerland	v	Denmark

Colovray Sports Centre, Nyon

30 November 2026

Portugal	v	Georgia

TBA

== See also ==
- 2026 Laurie O'Reilly Cup
- 2026 Oceania Rugby Women's Championship
- 2026 Pacific Four Series
- 2026 Women's Six Nations Championship
- 2026 WXV
- 2026 men's rugby union internationals
