= 2026 New Zealand women's rugby union tour of Britain, France and South Africa =

- Date: 5–26 September 2026
- Coach: (New Zealand) Whitney Hansen
Summary
P	W	D	L
Total
4	3	0	1
Opponent
P	W	D	L
South Africa
1	1	0	0
France
1	1	0	0
Scotland
1	1	0	0
England
1	0	0	1

The 2026 New Zealand women's rugby union tour of Britain, France and South Africa was an international rugby union tour by the New Zealand women's national rugby union team, the Black Ferns.

The first match of the tour was against South Africa at FNB Stadium on 5 September, in support of the third test of the Rugby's Greatest Rivalry tour. They then played three tests in Europe as part of the 2026 WXV Global Series.

== South Africa ==
5 September 2026
13:30 SAST (UTC+2)

South Africa	20–52	New Zealand
Try: Gwala 13' m Ngwevu 30' m Ubisi 48' m, 81' m Con: Dolf (0/4)	Report	Try: E. King 2' m, 57' c Sorensen-McGee 10' c, 42' m Viliko 37' c Joseph 51' c Sititi 73' c Vaipulu 75' c Con: H. King (1/2) 11'; Sorensen-McGee (5/6) 38', 52', 57', 74', 76'

FNB Stadium, Johannesburg
Attendance: 2,000
Referee: Zoe Naude (South Africa)

FB	15	Byrhandré Dolf
RW	14	Alichia Arries
OC	13	Zintle Mpupha	(substituted off) 38'
IC	12	Aphiwe Ngwevu	(substituted off) 52'
LW	11	Ayanda Malinga
FH	10	Libbie Janse van Rensburg
SH	9	Unam Tose	(substituted off) 58'
N8	8	Aseza Hele	(substituted off) 45'
OF	7	Catha Jacobs
BF	6	Sizophila Solontsi
RL	5	Danelle Lochner	(substituted off) 58'
LL	4	Vainah Ubisi
TP	3	Babalwa Latsha (c)	(substituted off) 58'
HK	2	Lindelwa Gwala	(substituted off) 45'
LP	1	Sanelisiwe Charlie	(substituted off) 45'
Replacements:
HK	16	Anushka Groenewald	(substituted on) 45'
PR	17	Yonela Ngxingolo	(substituted on) 45'
PR	18	Nombuyekezo Mdliki	(substituted on) 58'
LK	19	Nomsa Mokwai	(substituted on) 58'
LK	20	Shiniqwa Lamprecht	(substituted on) 52'
BR	21	Logan Welman	(substituted on) 45'
SH	22	Anacadia Minnaar	(substituted on) 58'
WG	23	Maceala Samboya	(substituted on) 38'
Coach:
(South Africa) Laurian Johannes-Haupt
(South Africa) Franzel September

FB	15	Braxton Sorensen-McGee
RW	14	Mererangi Paul	(yellow card) 28'
OC	13	Amy du Plessis		(substituted off) 61'
IC	12	Sylvia Brunt		(substituted off) 71'
LW	11	Ayesha Leti-I'iga	(yellow card) 49'
FH	10	Hannah King
SH	9	Maia Joseph		(substituted off) 57'
N8	8	Liana Mikaele-Tu'u		(substituted off) 67'
OF	7	Elinor-Plum King
BF	6	Mia Anderson
RL	5	Ma'ama Mo'onia Vaipulu
LL	4	Maiakawanakaulani Roos		(substituted off) 65'
TP	3	Veisinia Mahutariki-Fakalelu		(substituted off) 61'
HK	2	Georgia Ponsonby (c)	(yellow card) 48'	(substituted off) 57'
LP	1	Chryss Viliko		(substituted off) 50'
Replacements:
HK	16	Atlanta Lolohea	(substituted on) 57'
PR	17	Maddison Robinson	(substituted on) 50'
PR	18	Santo Taumata	(substituted on) 61'
LK	19	Laura Bayfield	(substituted on) 65'
LK	20	Amarante Sititi	(substituted on) 67'
BR	21	Tara Turner	(substituted on) 57'
SH	22	Ruahei Demant	(substituted on) 71'
WG	23	Justine McGregor	(substituted on) 61'
Coach:
(New Zealand) Whitney Hansen

Player of the Match:
Elinor-Plum King (New Zealand)

Assistant referees:
Giana Viljoen (South Africa)
Angie Bezuidenhout (South Africa)
Quinton Immelman (South Africa)

== France ==
12 September 2026
17:45 CEST (UTC+2)

France	14–28	New Zealand
Try: Bourdon Sansus 36' c Queyroi 67' c Con: Arbez (1/1) 37'; Queyroi (1/1) 67'	Report	Try: McGregor 14' c Anderson 26' c Paul 45' c Mikaele-Tu'u 71' c Con: Sorensen-McGee (4/4) 15', 27', 46', 72'

Stade de Gerland, Lyon
Attendance: 14,084
Referee: Clara Munarini, Italy

== Scotland ==
19 September 2026
17:10 BST (UTC+1)

Scotland	14–66	New Zealand
Try: Gallagher 22' c, 33' c Con: Nelson (2/2) 23', 34'	Report	Try: Palu 2' c Vaipulu 8' m McGregor 26' m E. King 30' c Sae 35' m, 47' c du Plessis 38' c Sititi 42' c Turner 45' c Saili 83' c Con: Sorensen-McGee (7/9) 3', 30', 36', 39', 43', 46', 48'); H. King (1/1) 84'

Edinburgh Rugby Stadium, Edinburgh
Attendance: 4,194
Referee: Jess Ling, Australia

== England ==
26 September 2026
15:00 BST (UTC+1)

England	26–19	New Zealand
Try: Moloney-MacDonald 13' c Ellie Kildunne 45' c Breach 54' m Harrison' 81' c Con: Harrison (3/5) 14', 46', 82'	Report	Try: du Plessis 25' m Leti-I'iga 31' c Paul 70' c Con: Sorensen-McGee (2/3) 32', 71'; Cards: (yellow card) 53' Mahutariki-Fakalelu

Twickenham Stadium, London
Attendance: 59,871
Referee: Clara Munarini, Italy

== See also ==
- 2026 WXV Global Series
- 2026 New Zealand rugby union tour of South Africa
