= 2025 Women's Rugby World Cup knockout stage =

Second and final stage of the competition

The knockout stage of the 2025 Women's Rugby World Cup was the second and final stage of the competition, following the pool stage. Played from 13 to 27 September, the knockout stage ended with the final, held at Twickenham Stadium in Twickenham, London. The top two teams from each pool advanced to the knockout stage to compete in a single-elimination tournament. There will be 8 matches in the knockout stage, including a third-place play-off played between the two losing teams of the semi-finals.

== Format ==
The knockout stage of the 2025 Women's Rugby World Cup will be contested by the eight teams that qualified from the pool stage, the top two teams from each of the four pools. Matches in the knockout stage are played to a result; if the scores are tied at the end of 80 minutes, a 10-minute period of extra time is played; if scores remain level after extra time, an additional 10-minute "sudden death" period will be played, and the first team to score any points wins. A kicking competition will ensue if the score remains tied.

== Qualified teams ==
Canada were the first side to secure qualification to the knockout stage after their victory over Wales in Pool B. Scotland were the next team to qualify after their win over Fiji in Pool B on the same day. England were the third team to qualify for the quarter-finals after their Pool A victory over Samoa. Ireland and New Zealand qualified on 31 August after their wins over Spain and Japan, respectively. France qualified on the same day after their Pool D victory over Brazil. South Africa also defeated Italy to reach the World Cup quarter-finals for the first time, with France's win confirming their progression.

Pool	Winners	Runners-up
A	England	Australia
B	Canada	Scotland
C	New Zealand	Ireland
D	France	South Africa

== Bracket ==
Quarter-finals
13 September – Exeter
New Zealand	46
South Africa	17
13 September – Bristol
Canada	46
Australia	5
14 September – Exeter
France	18
Ireland	13
14 September – Bristol
England	40
Scotland	8

Semi-finals
19 September – Bristol
New Zealand	19
Canada	34
20 September – Bristol
France	17
England	35

Final
27 September – Twickenham
Canada	13
England	33
Bronze final
27 September – Twickenham
New Zealand	42
France	26

== Quarter-finals ==
=== New Zealand vs South Africa ===
13 September 2025
12:30 BST (UTC+1)

New Zealand	46–17	South Africa
Try: Setefano 25' m Sorensen-McGee (2) 29' m, 44' m Holmes (2) 41' m, 65' c Olsen-Baker (2) 47' m, 54' c Vaha'akolo 80' c Con: Holmes (1/6) 55'; Sorensen-McGee (2/2) 66', 80+1'	Report	Try: Latsha 20' m Ngwevu 40+2' m Makua 76' c Con: Dolf (1/3) 77'

Sandy Park, Exeter
Attendance: 12,116
Referee: Sara Cox (England)

FB	15	Renee Holmes
RW	14	Braxton Sorensen-McGee
OC	13	Stacey Waaka
IC	12	Theresa Setefano	(substituted off) 35'
LW	11	Portia Woodman-Wickliffe
FH	10	Ruahei Demant (cc)	(substituted off) 67'
SH	9	Maia Joseph	(substituted off) 60'
N8	8	Kaipo Olsen-Baker
OF	7	Jorja Miller	(substituted off) 46'
BF	6	Liana Mikaele-Tu'u
RL	5	Alana Bremner
LL	4	Maia Roos	(substituted off) 56'
TP	3	Veisinia Mahutariki-Fakalelu	(substituted off) 60'
HK	2	Georgia Ponsonby	(substituted off) 56'
LP	1	Chryss Viliko	(substituted off) 60'
Replacements:
HK	16	Atlanta Lolohea	(substituted on) 56'
PR	17	Awhina Tangen-Wainohu	(substituted on) 60'
PR	18	Kate Henwood	(substituted on) 60'
SR	19	Laura Bayfield	(substituted on) 56'
BR	20	Kennedy Tukuafu (cc)	(substituted on) 46'
SH	21	Iritana Hohaia	(substituted on) 60'
CE	22	Katelyn Vaha'akolo	(substituted on) 67'
WG	23	Ayesha Leti-I'iga	(substituted on) 35'
Coach:
Allan Bunting

FB	15	Byrhandré Dolf
RW	14	Maceala Samboya
OC	13	Zintle Mpupha
IC	12	Aphiwe Ngwevu	(substituted off) 57'
LW	11	Ayanda Malinga
FH	10	Libbie Janse van Rensburg
SH	9	Nadine Roos
N8	8	Aseza Hele	(substituted off) 49'
OF	7	Sinazo Mcatshulwa	(substituted off) 65'
BF	6	Sizophila Solontsi
RL	5	Danelle Lochner	(substituted off) 49'
LL	4	Nolusindiso Booi (c)	(substituted off) 49'
TP	3	Babalwa Latsha	(substituted off) 65'
HK	2	Lindelwa Gwala	(substituted off) 65'
LP	1	Sanelisiwe Charlie	(substituted off) 49'
Replacements:
HK	16	Luchell Hanekom	(substituted on) 65'
PR	17	Yonela Ngxingolo	(substituted on) 49'
PR	18	Nombuyekezo Mdliki	(substituted on) 65'
SR	19	Vainah Ubisi	(substituted on) 49'
SR	20	Anathi Qolo	(substituted on) 49'
BR	21	Lerato Makua	(substituted on) 65'
BR	22	Catha Jacobs	(substituted on) 49'
CE	23	Eloise Webb	(substituted on) 57'
Coach:
Swys de Bruin

Player of the Match:
Kaipo Olsen-Baker (New Zealand)

Assistant referees:
Ella Goldsmith (Australia)
Kat Roche (United States)
Television match official:
Rachel Horton (Australia)
Foul play review officer:
Matteo Liperini (Italy)

=== Canada vs Australia ===
13 September 2025
16:00 BST (UTC+1)

Canada	46–5	Australia
Try: Hogan-Rochester 2' m Corrigan (2) 14' m, 20' c de Goede 17' c Hunt 38' c Forteza 50' c Paquin 77' m Con: de Goede (4/6) 18', 21', 40', 51'; Pen: Tessier (1/2) 72'	Report	Try: Miller 7' m

Ashton Gate Stadium, Bristol
Attendance: 16,571
Referee: Hollie Davidson (Scotland)

FB	15	Julia Schell
RW	14	Alysha Corrigan
OC	13	Florence Symonds	(substituted off) 69'
IC	12	Alex Tessier (c)
LW	11	Asia Hogan-Rochester
FH	10	Taylor Perry
SH	9	Justine Pelletier	(substituted off) 61'
N8	8	Fabiola Forteza	(substituted off) 66'
OF	7	Karen Paquin
BF	6	Caroline Crossley
RL	5	Courtney O'Donnell	(substituted off) 50'
LL	4	Sophie de Goede	(substituted off) 66'
TP	3	DaLeaka Menin	(substituted off) 59'
HK	2	Emily Tuttosi	(substituted off) 59'
LP	1	McKinley Hunt	(substituted off) 47'
Replacements:
HK	16	Gillian Boag	(substituted on) 59'
PR	17	Brittany Kassil	(substituted on) 47'
PR	18	Olivia DeMerchant	(substituted on) 59'
SR	19	Tyson Beukeboom	(substituted on) 50'
SR	20	Laetitia Royer	(substituted on) 66'
BR	21	Gabby Senft	(substituted on) 66'
SH	22	Olivia Apps	(substituted on) 61'
CE	23	Shoshanah Seumanutafa	(substituted on) 69'
Coach:
Kévin Rouet

FB	15	Caitlyn Halse
RW	14	Maya Stewart
OC	13	Georgina Friedrichs
IC	12	Cecilia Smith	(substituted off) 66'
LW	11	Desiree Miller
FH	10	Faitala Moleka	(substituted off) 23'	(substituted on) 33'
SH	9	Samantha Wood			(substituted off) 57'
N8	8	Siokapesi Palu (c)	(substituted off) 46'
OF	7	Emily Chancellor	(substituted off) 50'
BF	6	Piper Duck
RL	5	Michaela Leonard	(substituted off) 69'
LL	4	Kaitlan Leaney
TP	3	Asoiva Karpani	(substituted off) 46'
HK	2	Adiana Talakai	(substituted off) 23'
LP	1	Lydia Kavoa	(substituted off) 69'
Replacements:
HK	16	Katalina Amosa	(substituted on) 23'
PR	17	Faliki Pohiva	(substituted on) 69'
PR	18	Bridie O'Gorman	(substituted on) 46'
SR	19	Ashley Fernandez	(substituted on) 69'
BR	20	Ashley Marsters	(substituted on) 50'
BR	21	Tabua Tuinakauvadra	(substituted on) 46'
FH	22	Tia Hinds	(substituted on) 23'	(substituted off) 33'	(substituted on) 57'
CE	23	Trilleen Pomare	(substituted on) 66'
Coach:
Joanne Yapp

Player of the Match:
Sophie de Goede (Canada)

Assistant referees:
Lauren Jenner (Italy)
Holly Wood (England)
Television match official:
Leo Colgan (Ireland)
Foul play review officer:
Andrew McMenemy (Scotland)

=== France vs Ireland ===
14 September 2025
12:30 BST (UTC+1)

France	18–13	Ireland
Try: Escudero 59' c Grisez 67' m Con: Bourgeois (1/2) 60'; Pen: Bourgeois (2/2) 48', 76'	Report	Try: Djougang 6' m Flood 24' m Pen: O'Brien (1/1) 38'

Sandy Park, Exeter
Attendance: 11,618
Referee: Aimee Barrett-Theron (South Africa)

FB	15	Morgane Bourgeois
RW	14	Joanna Grisez
OC	13	Marine Ménager (cc)
IC	12	Gabrielle Vernier		(substituted off) 62'	(substituted on) 75'
LW	11	Kelly Arbey
FH	10	Lina Queyroi		(substituted off) 78'
SH	9	Pauline Bourdon Sansus		(substituted off) 75'
N8	8	Charlotte Escudero			(substituted off) 75'
OF	7	Léa Champon
BF	6	Axelle Berthoumieu		(substituted off) 21'	(substituted on) 30'	(substituted off) 52'
RL	5	Madoussou Fall Raclot
LL	4	Manaé Feleu (cc)	(yellow card) 40'
TP	3	Rose Bernadou	(yellow card) 18'		(substituted off) 30'
HK	2	Agathe Gérin		(substituted off) 66'
LP	1	Yllana Brosseau		(substituted off) 46'	(substituted on) 79'
Replacements:
HK	16	Manon Bigot		(substituted on) 75'
PR	17	Annaëlle Deshayes		(substituted on) 46'	(substituted off) 79'
PR	18	Assia Khalfaoui		(substituted on) 21'
SR	19	Hina Ikahehegi
BR	20	Séraphine Okemba		(substituted on) 62'
BR	21	Teani Feleu				(substituted on) 52'
SH	22	Alexandra Chambon	(yellow card) 79'	(substituted on) 75'
FB	23	Émilie Boulard		(substituted on) 78'
Coach:
Gaëlle Mignot & David Ortiz

FB	15	Stacey Flood
RW	14	Béibhinn Parsons
OC	13	Aoife Dalton
IC	12	Eve Higgins
LW	11	Amee-Leigh Costigan
FH	10	Dannah O'Brien
SH	9	Aoibheann Reilly
N8	8	Brittany Hogan		(substituted off) 58'
OF	7	Aoife Wafer
BF	6	Fiona Tuite
RL	5	Sam Monaghan (c)		(substituted off) 66'
LL	4	Ruth Campbell
TP	3	Linda Djougang
HK	2	Neve Jones		(substituted off) 66'
LP	1	Niamh O'Dowd		(substituted off) 58'
Replacements:
HK	16	Cliodhna Moloney-MacDonald		(substituted on) 66'
PR	17	Ellena Perry		(substituted on) 58'
PR	18	Sadhbh McGrath
SR	19	Eimear Corri Fallon		(substituted on) 66'
BR	20	Grace Moore	(yellow card) 59'	(substituted on) 58'
SH	21	Emily Lane
CE	22	Enya Breen
WG	23	Anna McGann
Coach:
Scott Bemand

Player of the Match:
Charlotte Escudero (France)

Assistant referees:
Maggie Cogger-Orr (New Zealand)
Natarsha Ganley (New Zealand)
Television match official:
Ian Tempest (England)
Foul play review officer:
Andrew McMenemy (Scotland)

=== England vs Scotland ===
14 September 2025
16:00 BST (UTC+1)

England	40–8	Scotland
Try: Clifford (2) 12' c, 40' c Talling 15' c Dow 31' m Cokayne 46' c Aitchison 64' c Con: Aitchison (5/6) 13', 16', 40+1', 47', 65'	Report	Try: Lloyd 80+2' m Pen: Nelson (1/1) 4'

Ashton Gate Stadium, Bristol
Attendance: 25,295
Referee: Aurélie Groizeleau (France)

FB	15	Helena Rowland
RW	14	Abby Dow
OC	13	Megan Jones	(substituted off) 70'
IC	12	Tatyana Heard	(substituted off) 61'
LW	11	Jess Breach
FH	10	Holly Aitchison
SH	9	Natasha Hunt	(substituted off) 61'
N8	8	Alex Matthews
OF	7	Sadia Kabeya
BF	6	Zoe Aldcroft (c)	(substituted off) 61'
RL	5	Rosie Galligan
LL	4	Morwenna Talling	(substituted off) 61'
TP	3	Maud Muir	(substituted off) 54'
HK	2	Amy Cokayne	(substituted off) 54'
LP	1	Kelsey Clifford	(substituted off) 45'
Replacements:
HK	16	Lark Atkin-Davies	(substituted on) 54'
PR	17	Mackenzie Carson	(substituted on) 45'
PR	18	Sarah Bern	(substituted on) 54'
SR	19	Abbie Ward	(substituted on) 61'
BR	20	Maddie Feaunati	(substituted on) 61'
SH	21	Lucy Packer	(substituted on) 61'
FH	22	Zoe Harrison	(substituted on) 61'
FB	23	Emma Sing	(substituted on) 70'
Coach:
John Mitchell

FB	15	Chloe Rollie	(substituted off) 61'
RW	14	Rhona Lloyd
OC	13	Emma Orr
IC	12	Lisa Thomson
LW	11	Francesca McGhie
FH	10	Helen Nelson
SH	9	Leia Brebner-Holden	(substituted off) 61'
N8	8	Jade Konkel-Roberts	(substituted off) 47'
OF	7	Evie Gallagher
BF	6	Rachel Malcolm (c)	(substituted off) 74'
RL	5	Sarah Bonar
LL	4	Emma Wassell	(substituted off) 74'
TP	3	Christine Belisle	(substituted off) 47'
HK	2	Lana Skeldon	(substituted off) 61'
LP	1	Leah Bartlett	(substituted off) 61'
Replacements:
HK	16	Elis Martin	(substituted on) 61'
PR	17	Molly Wright	(substituted on) 61'
PR	18	Molly Poolman	(substituted on) 47'
SR	19	Eva Donaldson	(substituted on) 74'
BR	20	Rachel McLachlan	(substituted on) 47'
BR	21	Alex Stewart	(substituted on) 74'
SH	22	Caity Mattinson	(substituted on) 61'
CE	23	Evie Wills	(substituted on) 61'
Coach:
Bryan Easson

Player of the Match:
Morwenna Talling (England)

Assistant referees:
Clara Munarini (Italy)
Amber Stamp-Dunstan (Wales)
Television match official:
Quinton Immelman (South Africa)
Foul play review officer:
Matteo Liperini (Italy)

== Semi-finals ==
=== New Zealand vs Canada ===
19 September 2025
19:00 BST (UTC+1)

New Zealand	19–34	Canada
Try: Kalounivale 26' c Mikaele-Tu'u 56' c Sorensen-McGee 65' m Con: Holmes (1/1) 27'; Sorensen-McGee (1/2) 57'	Report	Try: Pelletier 8' c Hogan Rochester 11' m Symonds 24' m de Goede 35' c Tessier 43' c Con: de Goede (3/5) 9', 36', 44'; Pen: de Goede (1/1) 74'

Ashton Gate, Bristol
Attendance: 24,592
Referee: Aimee Barrett-Theron (South Africa)

FB	15	Renee Holmes	(substituted off) 50'
RW	14	Braxton Sorensen-McGee
OC	13	Stacey Waaka
IC	12	Sylvia Brunt	(substituted off) 74'
LW	11	Portia Woodman-Wickliffe
FH	10	Ruahei Demant (cc)
SH	9	Risi Pouri-Lane	(substituted off) 62'
N8	8	Kaipo Olsen-Baker
OF	7	Kennedy Tukuafu (cc)	(substituted off) 56'
BF	6	Liana Mikaele-Tu'u
RL	5	Alana Bremner	(substituted off) 62'
LL	4	Maia Roos
TP	3	Tanya Kalounivale	(substituted off) 44'
HK	2	Georgia Ponsonby	(substituted off) 66'
LP	1	Chryss Viliko	(substituted off) 66'
Replacements:
HK	16	Atlanta Lolohea	(substituted on) 66'
PR	17	Kate Henwood	(substituted on) 66'
PR	18	Amy Rule	(substituted on) 44'
SR	19	Chelsea Bremner	(substituted on) 62'
BR	20	Layla Sae	(substituted on) 56'
SH	21	Maia Joseph	(substituted on) 62'
CE	22	Theresa Setefano	(substituted on) 74'
WG	23	Ayesha Leti-I'iga	(substituted on) 50'
Coach:
Allan Bunting

FB	15	Julia Schell
RW	14	Alysha Corrigan
OC	13	Florence Symonds
IC	12	Alex Tessier (c)
LW	11	Asia Hogan-Rochester
FH	10	Taylor Perry	(substituted off) 79'
SH	9	Justine Pelletier	(substituted off) 62'
N8	8	Fabiola Forteza	(substituted off) 66'	(substituted on) 77'
OF	7	Karen Paquin	(substituted off) 62'	(substituted on) 74'
BF	6	Caroline Crossley		(substituted off) 77'
RL	5	Courtney O'Donnell	(substituted off) 51'
LL	4	Sophie de Goede
TP	3	DaLeaka Menin
HK	2	Emily Tuttosi	(substituted off) 77'
LP	1	McKinley Hunt	(substituted off) 62'
Replacements:
HK	16	Gillian Boag	(substituted on) 77'
PR	17	Brittany Kassil	(substituted on) 62'
PR	18	Olivia DeMerchant
SR	19	Tyson Beukeboom	(substituted on) 51'
SR	20	Laetitia Royer	(substituted on) 62'	(substituted off) 74'
BR	21	Gabby Senft	(substituted on) 66'
SH	22	Olivia Apps	(substituted on) 62'
CE	23	Shoshanah Seumanutafa	(substituted on) 79'
Coach:
Kévin Rouet

Player of the Match:
Justine Pelletier (Canada)

Assistant referees:
Aurélie Groizeleau (France)
Ella Goldsmith (Australia)
Television match official:
Quinton Immelman (South Africa)
Foul play review officer:
Matteo Liperini (Italy)

=== France vs England ===
20 September 2025
15:30 BST (UTC+1)

France	17–35	England
Try: Konde (2) 24' m, 73' m Arbey 52' c Con: Bourgeois (1/3) 53'	Report	Try: Kildunne (2) 5' c, 69' c Cokayne 46' c Ward 59' c Jones 79' c Con: Harrison (5/5) 6', 47', 60', 70', 80'

Ashton Gate, Bristol
Attendance: 25,478
Referee: Maggie Cogger-Orr (New Zealand)

FB	15	Morgane Bourgeois
RW	14	Kelly Arbey	(substituted off) 71'
OC	13	Nassira Konde
IC	12	Gabrielle Vernier
LW	11	Marine Ménager (c)
FH	10	Carla Arbez	(substituted off) 71'
SH	9	Pauline Bourdon Sansus	(substituted off) 78'
N8	8	Teani Feleu
OF	7	Léa Champon
BF	6	Charlotte Escudero
RL	5	Madoussou Fall Raclot	(substituted off) 71'
LL	4	Hina Ikahehegi	(substituted off) 53'
TP	3	Rose Bernadou	(substituted off) 53'
HK	2	Agathe Gérin	(substituted off) 53'
LP	1	Yllana Brosseau	(substituted off) 53'
Replacements:
HK	16	Élisa Riffonneau	(substituted on) 53'
PR	17	Annaëlle Deshayes	(substituted on) 53'
PR	18	Assia Khalfaoui	(substituted on) 53'
SR	19	Taïna Maka	(substituted on) 71'
BR	20	Séraphine Okemba	(substituted on) 53'
SH	21	Alexandra Chambon	(substituted on) 78'
FH	22	Lina Tuy	(substituted on) 71'
WG	23	Emilie Boulard	(substituted on) 71'
Coach:
Gaëlle Mignot & David Ortiz

FB	15	Ellie Kildunne
RW	14	Abby Dow
OC	13	Megan Jones
IC	12	Tatyana Heard	(substituted off) 66'
LW	11	Jess Breach	(substituted off) 70'
FH	10	Zoe Harrison
SH	9	Natasha Hunt	(substituted off) 66'
N8	8	Alex Matthews
OF	7	Sadia Kabeya
BF	6	Zoe Aldcroft (c)
RL	5	Abbie Ward	(substituted off) 66'
LL	4	Morwenna Talling	(substituted off) 66'
TP	3	Maud Muir	(substituted off) 53'
HK	2	Amy Cokayne	(substituted off) 53'
LP	1	Hannah Botterman	(substituted off) 53'
Replacements:
HK	16	Lark Atkin-Davies	(substituted on) 53'
PR	17	Kelsey Clifford	(substituted on) 53'
PR	18	Sarah Bern	(substituted on) 53'
SR	19	Rosie Galligan	(substituted on) 66'
BR	20	Maddie Feaunati	(substituted on) 66'
SH	21	Lucy Packer	(substituted on) 66'
FH	22	Holly Aitchison	(substituted on) 66'
CE	23	Helena Rowland	(substituted on) 70'
Coach:
John Mitchell

Player of the Match:
Ellie Kildunne (England)

Assistant referees:
Clara Munarini (Italy)
Kat Roche (United States)
Television match official:
Rachel Horton (Australia)
Foul play review officer:
Andrew McMenemy (Scotland)

== Bronze final: New Zealand vs France ==
27 September 2025
12:30 BST (UTC+1)

New Zealand	42–26	France
Try: Demant 14' c Brunt 32' c Holmes 37' c Bayfield 40' m Sorensen-McGee (2) 46' m, 60' m Con: Holmes (3/6) 15', 33', 38'; Pen: Holmes (2/2) 55', 80'	Report	Try: Bourdon Sansus 10' c Champon 62' c Vernier 66' c Boulard 72' m Con: Arbez (1/1) 11'; Tuy (2/3) 63', 67'

Twickenham Stadium, London
Referee: Ella Goldsmith (Australia)

FB	15	Renee Holmes
RW	14	Braxton Sorensen-McGee
OC	13	Stacey Waaka
IC	12	Sylvia Brunt	(substituted off) 71'
LW	11	Portia Woodman-Wickliffe	(substituted off) 57'
FH	10	Ruahei Demant (c)
SH	9	Risi Pouri-Lane	(substituted off) 57'
N8	8	Kaipo Olsen-Baker
OF	7	Jorja Miller
BF	6	Liana Mikaele-Tu'u	(substituted off) 51'
RL	5	Laura Bayfield
LL	4	Maia Roos	(substituted off) 58'
TP	3	Tanya Kalounivale	(substituted off) 41'
HK	2	Georgia Ponsonby	(substituted off) 56'
LP	1	Chryss Viliko	(substituted off) 48'
Replacements:
HK	16	Vici-Rose Green	(substituted on) 56'
PR	17	Awhina Tangen-Wainohu	(substituted on) 48'
PR	18	Amy Rule	(substituted on) 41'
SR	19	Alana Bremner	(substituted on) 58'
BR	20	Layla Sae	(substituted on) 51'
SH	21	Maia Joseph	(substituted on) 57'
CE	22	Theresa Setefano	(substituted on) 71'
WG	23	Katelyn Vaha'akolo	(substituted on) 57'
Coach:
Allan Bunting

FB	15	Emilie Boulard
RW	14	Joanna Grisez
OC	13	Nassira Konde	(substituted off) 56'
IC	12	Gabrielle Vernier
LW	11	Marine Ménager (c)
FH	10	Carla Arbez	(substituted off) 56'
SH	9	Pauline Bourdon Sansus	(substituted off) 67'
N8	8	Teani Feleu
OF	7	Léa Champon
BF	6	Charlotte Escudero
RL	5	Madoussou Fall Raclot	(substituted off) 71'
LL	4	Taïna Maka	(substituted off) 40'
TP	3	Rose Bernadou	(substituted off) 51'
HK	2	Agathe Gérin	(substituted off) 61'
LP	1	Yllana Brosseau	(substituted off) 51'
Replacements:
HK	16	Manon Bigot	(substituted on) 61'
PR	17	Annaëlle Deshayes	(substituted on) 51'
PR	18	Assia Khalfaoui	(substituted on) 51'
SR	19	Hina Ikahehegi	(substituted on) 71'
BR	20	Marie Morland	(substituted on) 40'
SH	21	Alexandra Chambon	(substituted on) 67'
FH	22	Lina Tuy	(substituted on) 56'
WG	23	Kelly Arbey	(substituted on) 56'
Coach:
Gaëlle Mignot & David Ortiz

Player of the Match:
Renee Holmes (New Zealand)

Assistant referees:
Sara Cox (England)
Kat Roche (USA)
Television match official:
Quinton Immelman (South Africa)
Foul play review officer:
Ian Tempest (England)

== Final: Canada vs England ==
27 September 2025
16:00 BST (UTC+1)

Canada	13–33	England
Try: Hogan-Rochester (2) 5' m, 53' m Pen: de Goede (1/1) 34'	Report	Try: Kildunne 8' c Cokayne 19' c Matthews (2) 26' c, 69' c Ward 50' m Con: Harrison (4/5) 9', 20', 27', 70'

Twickenham Stadium, London
Attendance: 81,885
Referee: Hollie Davidson (Scotland)

FB	15	Julia Schell	(substituted off) 73'
RW	14	Alysha Corrigan
OC	13	Florence Symonds
IC	12	Alex Tessier (c)
LW	11	Asia Hogan-Rochester
FH	10	Taylor Perry
SH	9	Justine Pelletier	(substituted off) 53'
N8	8	Fabiola Forteza
OF	7	Karen Paquin	(substituted off) 66'
BF	6	Caroline Crossley	(substituted off) 66'
RL	5	Courtney O'Donnell	(substituted off) 53'
LL	4	Sophie de Goede
TP	3	DaLeaka Menin	(substituted off) 69'
HK	2	Emily Tuttosi	(substituted off) 66'
LP	1	McKinley Hunt	(substituted off) 41'
Replacements:
HK	16	Gillian Boag	(substituted on) 66'
PR	17	Brittany Kassil	(substituted on) 41'
PR	18	Olivia DeMerchant	(substituted on) 69'
SR	19	Tyson Beukeboom	(substituted on) 53'
SR	20	Laetitia Royer	(substituted on) 66'
BR	21	Gabby Senft	(substituted on) 66'
SH	22	Olivia Apps	(substituted on) 53'
CE	23	Shoshanah Seumanutafa	(substituted on) 73'
Coach:
Kévin Rouet

FB	15	Ellie Kildunne
RW	14	Abby Dow
OC	13	Megan Jones
IC	12	Tatyana Heard		(substituted off) 67'
LW	11	Jess Breach		(substituted off) 59'	(substituted on) 64'	(substituted off) 67'
FH	10	Zoe Harrison
SH	9	Natasha Hunt		(substituted off) 61'
N8	8	Alex Matthews
OF	7	Sadia Kabeya
BF	6	Zoe Aldcroft (c)
RL	5	Abbie Ward		(substituted off) 70'
LL	4	Morwenna Talling		(substituted off) 70'
TP	3	Maud Muir		(substituted off) 61'
HK	2	Amy Cokayne		(substituted off) 61'
LP	1	Hannah Botterman	(yellow card) 52'		(substituted off) 64'
Replacements:
HK	16	Lark Atkin-Davies		(substituted on) 61'
PR	17	Kelsey Clifford		(substituted on) 59'
PR	18	Sarah Bern		(substituted on) 61'
SR	19	Rosie Galligan		(substituted on) 70'
BR	20	Maddie Feaunati		(substituted on) 70'
SH	21	Lucy Packer		(substituted on) 61'
FH	22	Holly Aitchison		(substituted on) 67'
CE	23	Helena Rowland				(substituted on) 67'
Coach:
John Mitchell

Player of the Match:
Sadia Kabeya (England)

Assistant referees:
Aimee Barrett-Theron (South Africa)
Clara Munarini (Italy)
Television match official:
Leo Colgan (Ireland)
Foul play review officer:
Matteo Liperini (Italy)
