= 2026 WXV Global Series =

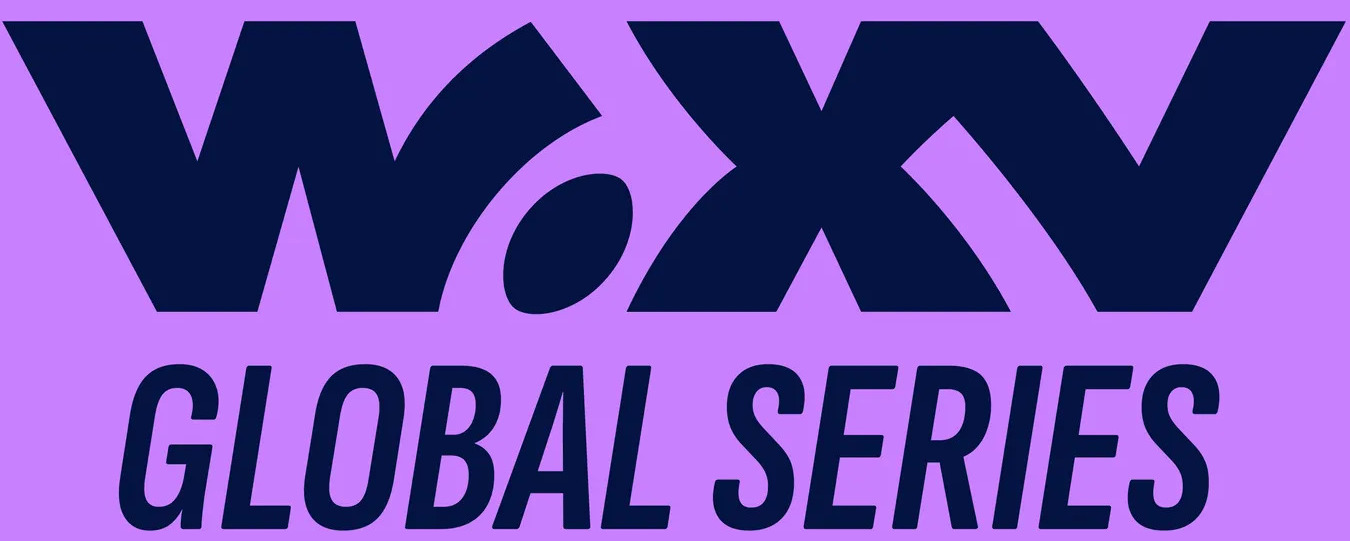

Tournament details
- Host: Various
- Dates: 12 September – 31 October 2026
- Teams: Australia; Canada; England; France; Ireland; Italy; Japan; New Zealand; Scotland; South Africa; United States; Wales

Tournament statistics
- Matches played: 30
- Top scorer(s): (New Zealand) Braxton Sorensen-McGee (51)
- Most tries: (United States) Freda Tafuna (7)

The 2026 WXV Global Series is the inaugural edition of the WXV Global Series, one of two successors to WXV. WXV Global Series consists of fixtures for women's national teams organised by participating national unions. The 12 participating nations remain fixed in the series for the 2026–2028 cycle with no promotion or relegation.

== Participating nations ==
Nation	Stadium			Competition	Regional association	World Rugby ranking
Nation	Home stadium	Capacity	Location	Competition	Regional association	World Rugby ranking
Australia	Stadium Australia	80,000	Sydney	Pacific Four Series	Oceania	9
Australia	Canberra Stadium	25,011	Canberra	Pacific Four Series	Oceania	9
Canada	BMO Field	28,745	Toronto	Pacific Four Series	North America	3
Canada	TD Place Stadium	25,269	Ottawa	Pacific Four Series	North America	3
England	Twickenham Stadium	82,000	London	Six Nations	Europe	1
England	CorpAcq Stadium	11,404	Sale	Six Nations	Europe	1
England	Sandy Park	15,600	Exeter	Six Nations	Europe	1
France	Stade de Gerland	35,029	Lyon	Six Nations	Europe	4
France	Stade Maurice David	8,787	Aix-en-Provence	Six Nations	Europe	4
France	Stade Marcel-Deflandre	18,000	La Rochelle	Six Nations	Europe	4
Ireland	Tallaght Stadium	10,547	Dublin	Six Nations	Europe	5
Ireland	Dexcom Stadium	10,500	Galway	Six Nations	Europe	5
Italy	Stadio Omero Tognon	5,000	Fontanafredda	Six Nations	Europe	6
Japan	Chichibunomiya Rugby Stadium	24,871	Tokyo	Asia Rugby Women's Championship	Asia	11
Japan	Kumagaya Rugby Ground	25,600	Kumagaya	Asia Rugby Women's Championship	Asia	11
New Zealand	Waikato Stadium	25,800	Hamilton	Pacific Four Series	Oceania	2
New Zealand	Okara Park	18,500	Whangārei	Pacific Four Series	Oceania	2
New Zealand	Te Kaha	25,000	Christchurch	Pacific Four Series	Oceania	2
Scotland	The Hive	7,800	Edinburgh	Six Nations	Europe	7
Spain	Instalaciones deportivas La Cartuja	1,500	Seville	Rugby Europe Women's Championship	Europe	14
South Africa	Athlone Stadium	34,000	Cape Town	Rugby Africa Women's Cup	Africa	10
United States	Texas Health Mansfield Stadium	7,000	Mansfield	Pacific Four Series	North America	8
United States	Geodis Park	30,109	Nashville	Pacific Four Series	North America	8
United States	Sports Illustrated Stadium	25,000	Harrison	Pacific Four Series	North America	8
Wales	Cardiff Arms Park	12,125	Cardiff	Six Nations	Europe	13

== Fixtures ==
Each team will play between four and six matches on two tour windows with a cross-regional format, where the European teams hosted the other teams in September, and vice-versa in November. Fixtures are arranged directly between member unions.

Confirmed test series
Home	Away	No.	Dates	Ref.
France	New Zealand	1	12 September	
France	Australia	1	19 September	
France	Canada	1	26 September	
England	Australia	1	12 September	
England	Canada	1	19 September	
England	New Zealand	1	26 September	
Scotland	Canada	1	12 September	
Scotland	New Zealand	1	19 September	
Scotland	Australia	1	26 September	
Wales	South Africa	1	18 September	
Wales	United States	1	26 September	
Italy	Japan	1	19 September	
Italy	South Africa	1	26 September	
Ireland	United States	1	20 September	
Ireland	Japan	1	27 September	
Spain	South Africa	1	4 October	
Canada	England	2	16–23 October	
Australia	Scotland	2	17–23 October	
New Zealand	France	3	17–31 October	
United States	Italy	2	17–24 October	
United States	England	1	30 October	
Japan	Wales	2	24–31 October	
South Africa	Ireland	2	24–31 October	

=== France home series – September ===
France host New Zealand, Australia, and Canada across three venues in September 2026. The first match against New Zealand was a rematch of the 2025 Women's Rugby World Cup 3rd place final.

12 September 2026
17:45 CEST (UTC+2)

France	14–28	New Zealand
Try: Bourdon Sansus 36' c Queyroi 67' c Con: Arbez (1/1) 37'; Queyroi (1/1) 67'	Report	Try: McGregor 14' c Anderson 26' c Paul 45' c Mikaele-Tu'u 71' c Con: Sorensen-McGee (4/4) 15', 27', 46', 72'

Stade de Gerland, Lyon
Attendance: 14,084
Referee: Clara Munarini, Italy

19 September 2026
17:45 CEST (UTC+2)

France	29–26	Australia
Try: Grando 37' m Boulard 41' c Bourdon Sansus 55' m Riffonneau 68' c Feleu 74' m Con: Arbez (1/3) 42'; Queyroi (1/2) 69'; Cards: (red card) 17' Mwayembe; (yellow card) 23' Champon; (yellow card) 23' Murie; (red card) 23' Correa; (yellow card) 64' Escudero	Report	Try: Merlo 17' c Naden 24' m Halse 28' c Duck 49' c Con: Wood (3/4) 18', 29', 50'; Cards: (yellow card) 56' Leonard

Stade Maurice David, Aix-en-Provence
Attendance: 6,500
Referee: Holly Wood, England

26 September 2026
17:45 CEST (UTC+2)

France	21–5	Canada
Try: Boulard 23' c, 50' c Chambon 79 c Con: Arbez (2/2) 24', 51'; Queyroi (1/1) 80'	Report	Try: Gibson 35' m

Stade Marcel-Deflandre, La Rochelle
Attendance: 15,000
Referee: Maggie Cogger-Orr, New Zealand

=== England home series – September ===
England host Australia, Canada and New Zealand across three venues in September 2026. The match against Canada on 19 September was a rematch of the 2025 Women's Rugby World Cup final, in which England defeated Canada 33–13 to claim the title.

12 September 2026
15:00 BST (UTC+1)

England	48–15	Australia
Try: Burton 19' m Campbell 47' c Jones 51' m Field 55' m Venner 57' m Kabeya 61' c Packer 67' c Moloney-MacDonald 78' c Con: Aitchison (1/4) 48'; Harrison (3/4) 62', 68', 78'	Report	Try: Pohiva 32' c Karpani 74' m Con: Wood (1/2) 33'; Pen: Wood 4'; Cards: (yellow card) 13' Wood; (yellow card) 58' Karpani

CorpAcq Stadium, Salford
Attendance: 9,251
Referee: Aurélie Groizeleau, France

19 September 2026
15:00 BST (UTC+1)

England	26–26	Canada
Try: Moloney-MacDonald (2) 10' m, 33' c Botterman 21' c Field 54' c Con: Harrison (3/4) 22', 34', 55'	Report	Try: Gibson 6' m Menin (2) 15' c, 40' c Apps 58' c Con: de Goede (3/4) 16', 41', 59'

Sandy Park, Exeter
Attendance: 14,573
Referee: Clara Munarini, Italy

26 September 2026
15:00 BST (UTC+1)

England	26–19	New Zealand
Try: Moloney-MacDonald 13' c Ellie Kildunne 45' c Breach 54' m Harrison' 81' c Con: Harrison (3/5) 14', 46', 82'	Report	Try: du Plessis 25' m Leti-I'iga 31' c Paul 70' c Con: Sorensen-McGee (2/3) 32', 71'; Cards: (yellow card) 53' Mahutariki-Fakalelu

Twickenham Stadium, London
Attendance: 59,871
Referee: Clara Munarini, Italy

=== Scotland home series – September ===
Scotland host Canada, New Zealand and Australia.

12 September 2026
16:10 BST (UTC+1)

Scotland	26–64	Canada
Try: E. Gallagher 16' c Campbell 33' m Skeldon 55' c Lloyd 72' c Con: Nelson (3/4) 17', 54', 73'	Report	Try: Gibson (2) 5' c, 18' c Apps (2) 10' m, 49' c Kassil 25' c Omokhuale 28' m Perry 44' c Pelletier 62' c Senft 75' c Bauder 78' m Con: C. Gallagher (7/10) 6', 19', 26', 45', 50', 62', 76'; Cards: (yellow card) 53' Senft; (red card) 56' Kassil

Edinburgh Rugby Stadium, Edinburgh
Attendance: 2,721
Referee: Holly Wood, England

19 September 2026
17:10 BST (UTC+1)

Scotland	14–66	New Zealand
Try: Gallagher (2) 22' c, 33' c Con: Nelson (2/2) 23', 34'	Report	Try: Palu 2' c Vaipulu 8' m McGregor 26' m E. King 30' c Sae 35' m, 47' c du Plessis 38' c Sititi 42' c Turner 45' c Saili 83' c Con: Sorensen-McGee (7/9) 3', 30', 36', 39', 43', 46', 48'); H. King (1/1) 84'

Edinburgh Rugby Stadium, Edinburgh
Attendance: 4,194
Referee: Jess Ling, Australia

26 September 2026
16:10 BST (UTC+1)

Scotland	10–30	Australia
Try: Gallagher 15' c Con: Nelson (1/1) 16'; Pen: Nelson 37'	Report	Try: Miller 34' m Wood 50' c Hoy 55' c Moleka 57' m Con: Samantha Wood ((2/4) 50', 56'; Pen: Samantha Wood 66', 77'

Edinburgh Rugby Stadium, Edinburgh
Attendance: 3,191
Referee: Aurélie Groizeleau, France

=== Wales home series – September ===
Wales hosted South Africa and the US, with both matches to take place at Cardiff Arms Park.

18 September 2026
19:15 BST (UTC+1)

Wales	50–19	South Africa
Try: Keight 6' c Tuipulotu (2) 10' c, 42' c Lockwood 21' m Davies 25' c K. Jones 33' m Neumann 38' c Callender 69'; Con: Bell (5/8) 7', 11', 26', 39', 43'	Report	Try: Jacobs 17' m Tshiremba 49'c Samboya 55' c Con: Dolf (2/3) 50', 56'; Cards: (yellow card) 21' Gwala; (red card) 35' Lochner

Cardiff Arms Park, Cardiff
Referee: Ella Goldsmith Australia

26 September 2026
15:00 BST (UTC+1)

Wales	24–26	United States
Try: Bevan 23' c Jones 30' c Tuipulotu 34' m Callender 40' m Con: Bell (2/4) 24', 31'	Report	Try: Tafuna (3) 5' c, 19' c, 52' m Coulibaly 27' c Con: Vogel (3/4) 6', 20', 28'

Cardiff Arms Park, Cardiff
Attendance: 3,367
Referee: Amber McLachlan, Australia

=== Italy home series – September ===
Italy hosted Japan and South Africa, with both matches to take place at Stadio Omero Tognon in Fontanafredda.

19 September 2026
14:30 UTC+2

Italy	55–21	Japan
Try: Muzzo 3' m, 79'; Frangipani 7' c D'Incà 24' c Vecchini 28' m Duca 31' c Ostuni Minuzzi 46' m Sgorbini 60' c Tonellotto 70' c Con: D'Incà (1/2) 7'; Granzotto (3/5) 25', 32', 61'; Rigoni (1/1) 70'; Cards: (yellow card) 74' Aggio	Report	Try: Asari 11' c Kuge 15' c Kawamura 76' c Con: Nishi (3/3) 11', 15', 77'; Cards: (yellow card) 70' Nduka

Stadio Omero Tognon, Fontanafredda
Referee: Zoë Naudé, South Africa

26 September 2026
14:30 UTC+2

Italy	29–41	South Africa
Try: D'Incà (2) 5' m, 52' c Vecchini 40' c Ostuni Minuzzi 58' c Con: Sillari (3/4) 41', 53', 59'; Pen: Sillari 65'	Report	Try: Groenewald (2) 11' c, 28' m Dolf 14' c Tshiremba 31' m Günter 68' c Welman 81' c Con: Cilliers (4/6) 11', 15', 69', 82'; Pen: Cilliers 55'; Cards: (yellow card) 47' Ngxingolo

Stadio Omero Tognon, Fontanafredda
Referee: Holly Wood, England

=== Ireland home series – September ===
Ireland hosted 2 games in September vs the United States and Japan. They also played Japan a week later in a non-WXV match.

20 September 2026
13:45 IST (UTC+1)

Ireland	36–40	United States
Try: Elmes Kinlan 7' m Moloney-MacDonald 14' m Wafer 19' c Higgins 27' c King 46' c Wall 80' m Con: O'Brien (3/6) 20', 28', 47'; Cards: (yellow card) 64' Elmes Kinlan	Report	Try: Perris-Redding 25' c Rogers 32' m Treder (2) 57' c, 65' c Taufo'ou 69' c Tafuna 72' c Con: Vogel (5/6) 26', 58', 65', 70', 73'

Tallaght Stadium, Dublin
Attendance: 3,755
Referee: Maggie Cogger-Orr, New Zealand

27 September 2026
12:45 IST (UTC+1)

Ireland	31–24	Japan
Try: Hogan (2) 10' c, 30'c Parsons (2) 37' m, 75' c Dalton 55' m Con: O'Brien (3/5) 11', 31', 76'; Cards: (yellow card) 42' King	Report	Try: Nagaoka (2) 43' m , 44' c Nagata 67' c Asari 80' m Con: Furuta (1/2) 45'; Nishi (1/2) 68'

Dexcom Stadium, Galway
Attendance: 3,000
Referee: Ella Goldsmith Australia

=== Spain home series – October ===
Spain hosted 1 games in October South Africa.

4 October 2026
12:00 CET (UTC+1)

Spain	0–20	South Africa
Cards: (yellow card) 68' Lapoujade	Report	Try: Jacobs 14' c Hele 44' m Cilliers 67' m Con: Cilliers (1/3) 15'; Pen: Cilliers 32'

Instalaciones deportivas La Cartuja, Seville
Attendance: 2,000
Referee: Bérénice Loubet, France

Notes:

- Lourdes Alameda (Spain) earned her 50th test cap.

=== Red Roses tour of North America – October ===
This series in October 2026 was a rematch of the 2025 Women's Rugby World Cup final. The England fixture will conclude the Red Roses tour of North America.

16 October 2026
19:00 EDT (UTC-4)

Canada	24–21	England
Try: Bauder 16' m Corrigan 44' c Menin 64' c Seumanutafa 78' m Con: de Goede (2/4) 44', 65'; Cards: (yellow card) 30' Royer	Report	Try: Feaunati 33' c Harrison 38' c Bern 47' c Con: Harrison (3/3) 34', 38', 48'; Cards: (yellow card) 13' Harrison

BMO Field, Toronto
Attendance: 18,621
Referee: Aurélie Groizeleau, France

23 October 2026
19:00 EDT (UTC-4)

Canada	31–22	England
Try: Omokhuale 16' c de Goede (3) 9' c m, 55' c, 61' m Bauder 64' c Con: de Goede (3/5) 16', 56', 65'	Report	Try: Feaunati 8' c Cokayne 52' c Sing 80' m Con: Harrison (1/1) 9'; Sing (1/2) 53'; Pen: Harrison 42'

TD Place Stadium, Ottawa
Attendance: 13,117
Referee: Aurélie Groizeleau, France

30 October 2026
17:15 EDT (UTC-4)

United States	12–55	England
Try: Rogers 24' c Zackary 81' m Con: Vogel (1/2) 25'; Cards: (yellow card) 68' Tupou	Report	Try: Moloney-MacDonald (4) 5' m, 13' m, 43' m, 48' m Jones 30' c Venner 60' c Field 69'; Feaunati 72' c Kabeya 78' c Con: Sing (2/6) 30', 60'; Harrison (3/3) 69', 72', 78'

Sports Illustrated Stadium, Harrison
Referee: Zoë Naudé, South Africa

=== Australia vs Scotland – October ===
The two-test series in October 2026 was Scotland's first-ever tour of Australia.

17 October 2026
13:00 AEDT (UTC+11)

Australia	56–12	Scotland
Try: Merlo 16' c Stewart 21' c Miller (2) 30' c, 43' c Whitaker (2) 35' c, 65' c Ellis 39' c Karpani 80' c Con: Wood (6/6) 17', 22', 31', 35', 40', 44'; Moleka (2/2) 66', 81'	Report	Try: Buchanan 5' m Malcolm 46' c Con: Nelson (1/2) 47'; Cards: (yellow card) 29' Smith; (yellow card) 79' Donaldson

Stadium Australia, Sydney
Referee: Maggie Cogger-Orr, New Zealand

23 October 2026
19:30 AEDT (UTC+11)

Australia	38–31	Scotland
Try: Whitaker 3' c Stewart 11' c Moleka 44' c Duck 51' c Palu 61' c Con: Wood (5/5) 4', 12', 45', 52', 63'); Pen: Wood (60'); Cards: (yellow card) 34' (red card) 75' Smith; (yellow card) 37' Ellis; (yellow card) 64' Karpani	Report	Try: Malcolm (2) 15' m, 78' c Sutcliffe 35' c Buchanan 38' m Lloyd 56' c Con: Nelson (3/4) 36', 57', 79'; Cards: (yellow card) 44' Rollie; (yellow card) 72' Lloyd

Canberra Stadium, Canberra
Referee: Maggie Cogger-Orr, New Zealand

Notes:

- Asoiva Karpani (Australia) earned her 50th test cap.

=== New Zealand vs France – October ===
New Zealand host France in a three-test series in October 2026. It was a rematch of the 2025 Women's Rugby World Cup 3rd place final.

17 October 2026
15:05 NZDT (UTC+13)

New Zealand	81–12	France
Try: Maia Joseph (2) 2' m, 8' m Leti-I'iga 19' c, 42' m du Plessis (2) 24' c, 28' c Olsen-Baker 35' c Ponsonby 41' m Tuliau-Tua'a (4) 47' m, 53' c, 69' c, 71' c Demant 66' c Con: Sorensen-McGee (8/13) 20', 25', 29', 36', 54', 67', 70', 72'	Report	Try: Murie 59' m Bazola-Allières 76' c Con: Bourgeois (1/2) 76'

Waikato Stadium, Hamilton
Referee: Ella Goldsmith, Australia

24 October 2026
15:05 NZDT (UTC+13)

New Zealand	31–12	France
Try: Paul 15' c, 72' m Tuliau-Tua'a 30' c Sorensen-McGee 70' c Con: Sorensen-McGee (3/4) 15', 30', 71'	Report	Try: Toure 6' m Grando 21' c Con: Arbez (1/2) 23'

Okara Park, Whangārei
Referee: Amber McLachlan, Australia

31 October 2026
19:10 NZDT (UTC+13)

New Zealand	36–7	France
Try: Tuliau-Tua'a (2) 12' m, 50' m Sorensen-McGee 18' c Robinson 58' c Paul 67' m Green 77' c Con: Sorensen-McGee (2/5) 19', 58'; H. King (1/1) 78'; Cards: (yellow card) 64' Tuliau-Tua'a	Report	Try: Mailagi 40' c Con: Arbez (1/1) 41'

Te Kaha, Christchurch
Attendance: 15,000+
Referee: Ella Goldsmith, Australia

=== USA vs Italy – October ===
The USA hosted Italy in a two-match test series in October.

17 October 2026
17:00 CDT (UTC-05))

United States	36–27	Italy
Try: Perris-Redding (3) 10' c, 21' c, 47' c Rogers (2) 28' c, 33' m Con: Vogel (4/5) 11', 22', 29', 48'; Pen: Vogel 76'; Cards: (yellow card) 57' Uhatafe	Report	Try: Granzotto (2) 15 m', 79' m Vecchini 38' m Muzzo 55' c Zanette 58' m Con: Granzotto (1/5) 56'; Cards: (yellow card) 61' Cuoghi

Texas Health Mansfield Stadium, Mansfield
Attendance: 3,640
Referee: Holly Wood, England

24 October 2026
15:15 CDT (UTC-05))

United States	54–24	Italy
Try: Sagapolu (2) 20' c, 28' c Carlton 33' c Tafuna (3) 39' c, 44' m, 65' c Perris-Redding 61' c Zackary 77' c Con: Vogel (7/8) 21', 29', 34', 40', 62', 66', 78'	Report	Try: Granzotto 8' m Sgorbini 14' c Ostuni Minuzzi 55' m Rigoni 69' c Con: Sillari (2/4) 15', 70'

Geodis Park, Nashville
Referee: Zoë Naudé, South Africa

=== South Africa vs Ireland – October ===
The two-test series in October 2026 will provide competition for the similarly ranked nations.

24 October 2026
15:00 SAST (UTC+2)

South Africa	27–40	Ireland
Try: Hele 20' m Ubisi 28' c Tshiremba 38' m Makua 68' m Arries 79' m Con: Cilliers (1/5) 29'	Report	Try: Dalton 8' c Linda Djougang (2) 32' c, 74' c Clohessy 42' c Parsons 42' m E. King 52' c Con: O'Brien (5/6) 9', 34', 43', 53', 75'; Cards: (yellow card) 24' E. King; (yellow card) 67' Higgins

Athlone Stadium, Cape Town
Attendance: 3,700
Referee: Jess Ling, Australia

Notes:

- Yonela Ngxingolo (South Africa) earned her 50th test cap.

31 October 2026
15:00 SAST (UTC+2)

South Africa	17–38	Ireland
Try: Tose 2' c Solontsi 37' m Ubisi 58' m Con: Cilliers (1/3) 59'; Cards: (yellow card) 16' Arries; (yellow card) 70' Cilliers	Report	Try: King 14' c Parsons (3) 21' c, 61' m, 74' c Dalton 70' c Tuite-O'Sullivan 79' m Con: O'Brien (4/6) 14', 22', 71', 75'; Cards: (yellow card) 38' Reilly

Athlone Stadium, Cape Town
Referee: Jess Ling, Australia

=== Japan vs Wales – October ===
The two-test series in October 2026 will provide competition for the similarly ranked nations.

24 October 2026
18:30 JST (UTC+9)

Japan	0–17	Wales
	Report	Try: Lockwood 35' c, 78' m K. Jones 65' m Con: Bell (1/3) 36'

Chichibunomiya Rugby Stadium, Tokyo
Referee: Julianne Zussman, Canada

31 October 2026
16:00 JST (UTC+9)

Japan	5–29	Wales
Try: Nagaoka 15' m Cards: (yellow card) 45' Nduka	Report	Try: Metcalfe 7' c K. Jones 25' c Amy Williams (2) 39' m, 55' m Tuipulotu 49' m Con: Keight (1/1) 8'; George (1/4) 27'; Cards: (yellow card) 68' Bevan; (yellow card) 70' B. King

Kumagaya Rugby Ground, Kumagaya
Referee: Julianne Zussman, Canada

== Leading scorers ==
As of 31 October 2026

=== Most points ===
Pos.	Name	Team	Pts.
1	Braxton Sorensen-McGee	New Zealand	62
2	Samantha Wood	Australia	51
3	Zoe Harrison	England	45
4	Bella Vogel	United States	43
5	Claudia Moloney-MacDonald	England	40
6	Shyrah Tuliau-Tua'a	New Zealand	35
6	Freda Tafuna	United States	35
7	Sophie de Goede	Canada	31
8	Dannah O'Brien	Ireland	30
9	Jakkie Cilliers	South Africa	25
9	Mererangi Paul	New Zealand	25
9	Béibhinn Parsons	Ireland	25
9	Georgie Perris-Redding	United States	25
10	Francesca Granzotto	Italy	23
10	Helen Nelson	Scotland	23

=== Most tries ===
Pos.	Name	Team	Tries
1	Claudia Moloney-MacDonald	England	8
2	Freda Tafuna	United States	7
2	Shyrah Tuliau-Tua'a	New Zealand	7
3	Georgie Perris-Redding	United States	5
3	Mererangi Paul	New Zealand	5
3	Béibhinn Parsons	Ireland	5
3	Amy du Plessis	New Zealand	4
3	Lizzie Gibson	Canada	4
3	Hope Rogers	United States	4
3	Kelsey Jones	Wales	4
3	Sisilia Tuipulotu	Wales	4
3	Evie Gallagher	Scotland	4
4	DaLeaka Menin	Canada	3
4	Sophie de Goede	Canada	3
4	Olivia Apps	Canada	3
4	Maria Tshiremba	South Africa	3

== See also ==
- 2026 Nations Championship
- 2026 women's rugby union internationals
- 2026 WXV Global Series Challenger
