= 2026 Rugby Africa Women's Cup =

Rugby tournament

Tournament details
- Host: Kenya
- Venue: RFUEA Ground, Nairobi
- Date: 23–31 May 2026
- Countries: Kenya; Madagascar; South Africa; Uganda
- Teams: 4

Final positions
- Champions: South Africa (5th title)
- Runner-up: Kenya

Tournament statistics
- Matches played: 6

The 2026 Rugby Africa Women's Cup is the sixth edition of the tournament and will be held in RFUEA Ground in Nairobi, Kenya from 23 to 31 May 2026.

The Springbok Women were crowned champions for the fifth time after they defeated hosts, Kenya, in the final match. Uganda survived relegation with win over Madagascar to relegation to 2027 Rugby Africa Women's Cup Division 1.

== Venue ==
2026 Rugby Africa Women's Cup is located in Kenya	Nairobi
2026 Rugby Africa Women's Cup is located in Kenya	RFUEA Ground
2026 Rugby Africa Women's Cup is located in Kenya	Capacity: 6,000

== Standings ==
Pos	Team	Pld	W	D	L	PF	PA	PD	TF	TA	TB	LB	Pts	Qualification	RSA	KEN	UGA	MAD
1	South Africa	3	3	0	0	146	45	+101	85	20	3	0	15		—	35–20	47–20	64–5
2	Kenya	3	2	0	1	120	45	+75	85	5	2	0	10			—	43–10	57–0
3	Uganda	3	1	0	2	76	102	−26	20	70	0	0	4				—	46–12
4	Madagascar	3	0	0	3	17	167	−150	5	100	0	0	0	Relegated to 2027 Rugby Africa Women's Cup Division 1				—

Legend: Blue = home team win; Yellow = draw; Red = away team win.

== Fixtures ==
All match times are East Africa Time (UTC+3).

=== Round 1 ===
23 May 2026
14:00

South Africa	64–5	Madagascar
Try: Jakkie Cilliers 17' c Alichia Arries 30' m Aphiwe Ngwevu 34' c Chuma Qawe 40' c Nombuyekezo Mdliki 40' m Faith Tshauke 51' m Logan Welman 54' c Thandile Mazwi 60' c Thami Yeko 71' c Mary Zulu 80' c Con: Jakkie Cilliers (7/10) 18', 35', 41', 55', 61', 72', 81'	Report	Try: Mialy Ravaoarinoro 11' m

RFUEA Ground, Nairobi
Referee: Precious Pazani (Zimbabwe)

Player of the Match:
Jakkie Cilliers (South Africa)
Notes:

- The Bok Women will wear black armbands in memory of former captain Lusanda Dumke, away in December 2025.
- The a minute’s silence before the Rugby Africa Women’s Cup kicks off.
- Logan Welman, Thandile Mazwi, Ntsako Mbombi, Insaaf Levy, Naima Hlatshwayo, Thami Yeko (all South Africa) made their international debuts.

23 May 2026
16:00

Kenya	43–10	Uganda
	Report

RFUEA Ground, Nairobi

Player of the Match:
Faith Livoi (Kenya)
Notes:

- Unity Namulala, Justin Anguchia, Gertrude Kateesa, and Shaine Babirye (all Uganda) made their international debuts.

=== Round 2 ===
27 May 2026
14:00

South Africa	47–20	Uganda
Try: Shaunique Alexander 16' m Alicia Arries 29' c, 75' c Logan Welman 36' c Thamie Yeko 47' c Naima Hlatshwayo 51' c Faith Tshauke 66' c Con: Jakkie Cilliers (6/7) 30', 37', 48', 52', 67', 76'	Report	Try: Peace Lekuru 3' c Gertrude Kateesa 10' m Mastula Nambozo 43' m Con: Bushira Namutebi (1/3) 3'; Pen: Bushira Namutebi 80'

RFUEA Ground, Nairobi
Referee: Julie Randriarimanana (Madagascar)

Player of the Match:
Logan Welman (South Africa)
Notes:

- Shaunique Alexander, Zethu Gcaza, Abigail Smit (all South Africa) made their international debuts.

27 May 2026
16:00

Kenya	57–0	Madagascar
	Report

RFUEA Ground, Nairobi
Referee: Rejoyce Simeti (Zimbabwe)

Player of the Match:
Stella Wafula (Kenya)

=== Round 3 ===
31 May 2026
14:00

Uganda	46–12	Madagascar
	Report

RFUEA Ground, Nairobi
Referee: Bineta Sene (Senegal)

Player of the Match:
Mastula Nambozo (Uganda)

31 May 2026
16:00

South Africa	35–20	Kenya
Try: Alichia Arries 12' c Naima Hlatshwayo 44' m Logan Welman 55' m Jakkie Cilliers 61' m Ntsako Mbombi 82' c Con: Jakkie Cilliers (2/5) 13', 83'; Pen: Jakkie Cilliers 78', 81'	Report	Try: Faith Livoi 25' m Knight Otuoma 66' c Sinaida Mokaya 74' m Con: Sinaida Mokaya (1/3) 67'; Pen: Sinaida Mokaya 29'

RFUEA Ground, Nairobi
Referee: Precious Pazani (Zimbabwe)

FB	15	Chuma Qawe
RW	14	Alichia Arries
OC	13	Naima Hlatshwayo
IC	12	Aphiwe Ngwevu	(substituted off) 81'
LW	11	Jakkie Cilliers
FH	10	Thami Yeko	(substituted off) 46'
SH	9	Anacadia Minnaar
N8	8	Logan Welman
OF	7	Sinelitha Noxeke	(substituted off) 61'
BF	6	Faith Tshauke	(substituted off) 75'
RL	5	Anathi Qolo (c)	(substituted off) 48'
LL	4	Nomsa Mokwai
TP	3	Nombuyekezo Mdliki	(substituted off) 46'
HK	2	Anushka Groenewald	(substituted off) 77'
LP	1	Sanelisiwe Charlie	(substituted off) 46'
Replacements:
HK	16	Roseline Botes	(substituted on) 77'
PR	17	Xoliswa Khuzwayo	(substituted on) 46'
PR	18	Yonela Ngxingolo	(substituted on) 46'
LK	19	Thandile Mazwi	(substituted on) 48'
LK	20	Nobuhle Mjwara	(substituted on) 61'
BR	21	Ntsako Mbombi	(substituted on) 75'
SH	22	Mary Zulu	(substituted on) 46'
WG	23	Shaunique Alexander	(substituted on) 81'
Coach:
(South Africa) Laurian Johannes-Haupt

FB	15	Freshia Oduor
RW	14	Janet Okelo
OC	13	Moreen Muritu
IC	12	Faith Livoi
LW	11	Stella Wafula
FH	10	Sinaida Mokaya
SH	9	Judith Auma (c)
N8	8	Sheila Chajira
OF	7	Marvel Oswago
BF	6	Nelly Chikombe
RL	5	Charity Nilla
LL	4	Naomi Jelagat
TP	3	Natasha Emali (c)
HK	2	Naomi Muhanji
LP	1	Jane Chanya
Replacements:
HK	16	Knight Otuoma
PR	17	Jascenta Musakali
PR	18	Valentine Otieno
LK	19	Edith Sitati
LK	20	Naomi Amuguni
BR	21	Edith Nariaka
SH	22	Angel Salamba
WG	23	Yvette Okech
Coach:
(Kenya) Simon Odongo

Player of the Match:
Nomsa Mokwai (South Africa)
