= Tsotsobe =

Tsotsobe is a South African Xhosa surname. Notable people with the surname include:

- Lonwabo Tsotsobe (born 1984), South African cricketer
- Nomsebenzi Tsotsobe (born 1978), South African rugby union player and model
