= Snenhlanhla Shozi =

- Born: 5 May 1997 (age 29)

Rugby union career
National sevens team
Years	Team	Comps
- South Africa

Snenhlanhla Shozi (born 5 May 1997) is a South African rugby sevens player.

Shozi competed for South Africa at the 2018 Rugby World Cup Sevens in San Francisco. In 2022, she was named in South Africa's squad for the Commonwealth Games in Birmingham where they finished in seventh place.
