= Luchell Hanekom =

South African rugby union player

- Born: 17 January 2001 (age 25) Port Nolloth, South Africa
- Height: 165 cm (5 ft 5 in)
- Weight: 93 kg (205 lb)

Rugby union career
- Position: Hooker
Senior career
Years	Team	Apps	(Points)
- Western Province
International career
Years	Team	Apps	(Points)
2022–	South Africa	11	(0)
- Correct as of 14 September 2025

Luchell Hanekom (born 17 January 2001), is a South African international rugby union player, playing as a hooker.

== Biography ==
Luchell Hanekom was born on 17 January 2001.

In 2025, she played for Western Province. Hanekom made her international debut against Madagascar in Rugby Africa Women's Cup in 2022. She was named in the Springbok Women's squad to the 2025 Women's Rugby World Cup that will be held in England.
