= Nomsebenzi Tsotsobe =

- Born: Nomsebenzi Agnes Tsotsobe; 24 November 1978 (age 47) Kwa Magxaki, Port Elizabeth
- Height: 1.65 m (5 ft 5 in)
- Weight: 65 kg (143 lb)
- School: St Thomas SSS
- Notable relative: Lonwabo Tsotsobe (brother)

Rugby union career
Amateur team(s)
Years	Team	Apps	(Points)
2000(?) –	Hilltop Eagles		
Provincial / State sides
Years	Team	Apps	(Points)
2001 –	Eastern Province		
International career
Years	Team	Apps	(Points)
2004 –	South Africa		

Nomsebenzi Agnes "Noms" Tsotsobe (born 24 November 1978) is a South African rugby union player and model. Tsotsobe was born in Kwa Magxaki, Port Elizabeth, and has played for and captained the South Africa women's national rugby union team, the Springboks, since their founding in 2004.

== Modelling ==
Tsotsobe made her debut as an international model in Paris in 2002.

== Rugby ==
Tsotsobe specialised in the position of Flanker in rugby, and started her career playing for the Hilltop Eagles club in Eastern Cape Province. She won a number of honours both for the Eagles and while playing representative competition for Eastern Province, and was named captain of Eastern Province in 2002.

Tsotsobe played for South Africa's women's rugby union team in their first international match against Wales on 29 May 2004, with the Springboks losing the test match at Adcock Stadium, Port Elizabeth, 5–8. Tsotsobe was named captain for the second test on 5 June 2004, which the Springboks lost 15–16 at Loftus Versfeld, Pretoria. The team had their first success in their next international test on 30 April 2005, played at Ebbw Vale, Wales, beating the Welsh team 24–9.

In April 2005 Tsotsobe was chosen as one of ten Beauties of Sport in a contest run by South African Sports Illustrated.

Tsotsobe continued to captain the national team for several years, including at the Women's Rugby World Cup events. As of 2008 she was still serving as captain of the national team.

Tsotsobe took on the role of team manager for the South Africa women's under-20 team, and was to serve in this position for the Under-20 Nations Cup in the United States in 2011.

== Car accident ==
In October 2005 Tsotsobe was involved in a motor car accident in New Brighton which resulted in the death of a pedestrian, 21-year-old Luyanda Mtsele of KwaFord, a student studying her final year of civil engineering at Nelson Mandela Metropolitan University. In 2010 Tsotsobe was acquitted of a charge of culpable homicide over this incident, the court finding that Mtsele and a friend were under the influence of alcohol and were inappropriately walking down the middle of the road at the time of the accident.
