= Hina Ikahehegi =

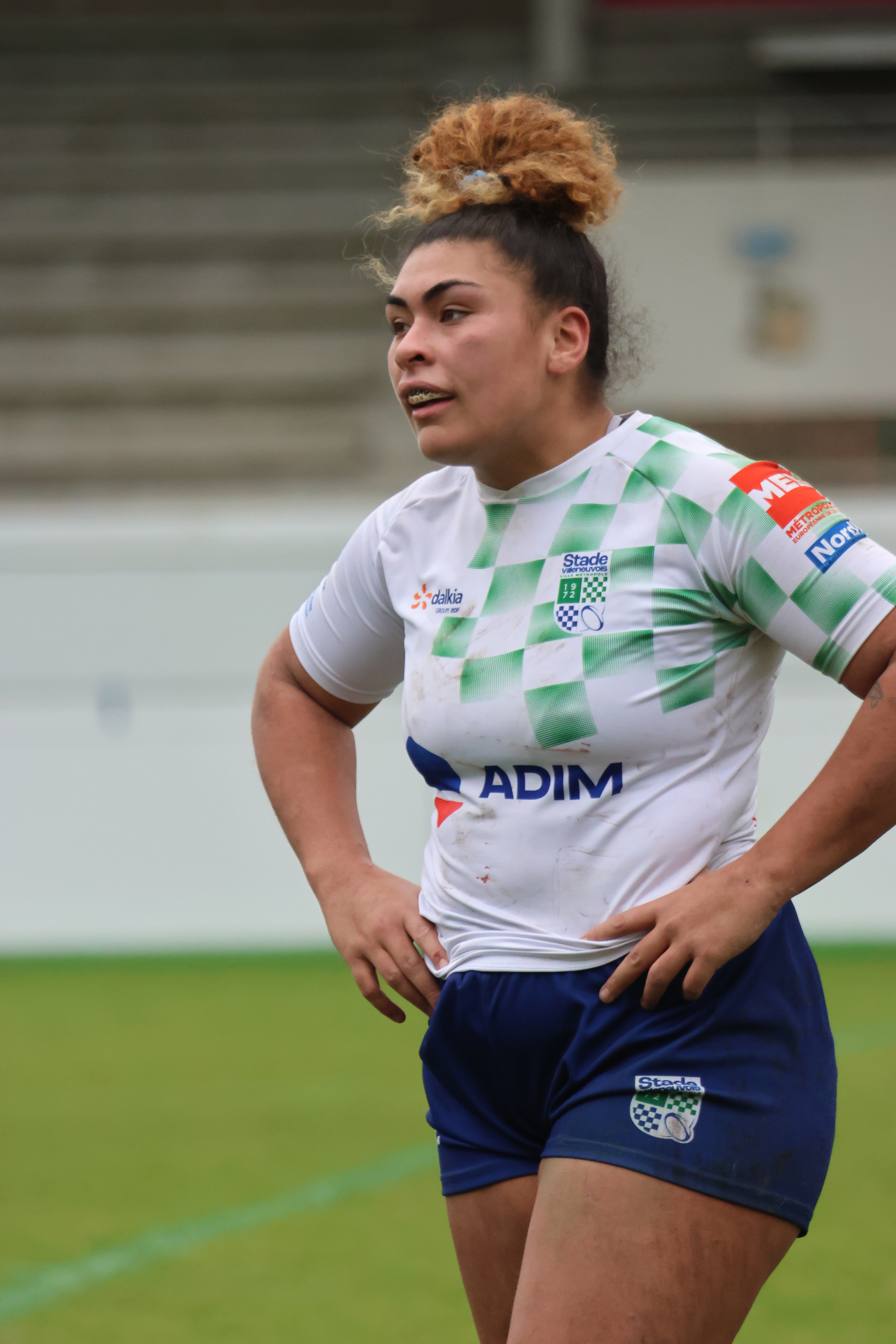
- Ikahehegi with Stade Villeneuvois LM in 2025
- Born: 29 April 2003 (age 23)
- Height: 183 cm (6 ft 0 in)

Rugby union career
- Position: Lock
Senior career
Years	Team	Apps	(Points)
2021–2025	Stade Villeneuvois LM		(0)
2025–	Stade Bordelais		
International career
Years	Team	Apps	(Points)
2024–	France	8	(0)

Hina Ikahehegi (born 29 April 2003) is a French rugby union player.

== Early life and career ==
Ikahehegi is of Wallisian descent and grew up in Pas-de-Calais, France. She comes from a family of rugby players, her father played for RC Arras, and her brother, Aselo, played for Racing 92 and USON Nevers.

She played for ASS Leforest before joining the Villeneuve-d'Ascq youth team.

== Rugby career ==
Ikahehegi made her debut for Stade Villeneuvois LM in October 2021.

In December 2023, she was part of the French wider training squad that was preparing for the 2024 Six Nations tournament.

She eventually made her international debut for France against England in a warm-up match before the WXV 1 tournament in September 2024.

She was named in the French squad to the 2025 Women's Rugby World Cup on 2 August.
