= Felicia Jacobs =

South African rugby union and sevens player

- Born: 7 April 1998 (age 28)
- Height: 150 cm (4 ft 11 in)
- Weight: 44 kg (97 lb; 6 st 13 lb)

Rugby union career
Senior career
Years	Team	Apps	(Points)
–	Boland Dames		
International career
Years	Team	Apps	(Points)
2024–	South Africa	8	(15)
National sevens team
Years	Team		Comps
	South Africa		10 (30)

Felicia Brigitte Jacobs (born 7 April 1998) is a South African rugby player.

== Rugby career ==
Jacobs competed for South Africa at the 2022 Commonwealth Games in Birmingham. She scored a hat-trick in their seventh-place victory over Sri Lanka. She was also selected to represent South Africa at the 2022 Rugby World Cup Sevens in Cape Town.

In September 2024, She was named in South Africa's fifteens squad for the WXV 2 tournament.
