= Mary Zulu =

South African rugby union player

- Born: 6 December 2002 (age 23)
- Height: 160 cm (5 ft 3 in)
- Weight: 72 kg (159 lb)
- University: University of KwaZulu-Natal

Rugby union career
- Position: Fly-half
Senior career
Years	Team	Apps	(Points)
	Sharks		(0)
International career
Years	Team	Apps	(Points)
2023–	South Africa	18	(45)
2026–	South Africa A	1	(0)
- Correct as of 24 August 2026

Mary Zulu (born 6 December 2002), is a South African rugby union player who played as a Fly-half for Sharks and South Africa.

== Biography ==
Mary Zulu is born on 6 December 2002. Orphaned as a baby and raised in Mandini, KwaZulu-Natal.

In 2025, she plays for the Natal Sharks. In August, she had fifteen caps for the South African team when she was selected to participate in the World Cup in England under the colours of her country.
