= MyPlayers =

Rugby players' organisation

- Founded: 1997
- Type: Players' association
- Location: South Africa
- Region served: South African professional rugby players and match officials
- Key people: Eugene Henning (CEO), Jean de Villiers (Chairperson)
- Website: myplayers.co.za

MyPlayers, formerly the South African Rugby Players' Association (SARPA), is the representative body for professional rugby players and contracted match officials in South Africa. Established in 1997, the organisation works on policies related to player welfare, collective bargaining, and commercial representation. It is owned and governed by its members, who are involved in the organisation’s decision-making structures.

== History ==
MyPlayers was launched as SARPA following the professionalisation of rugby in South Africa. It rebranded as MyPlayers to reflect an expanded role beyond basic player representation. In 2022, former Springbok captain Jean de Villiers was appointed chairperson of the board. The current CEO is Eugene Henning.

During its history, SARPA/MyPlayers has been involved in a number of important labour negotiations, including agreements in 2004 addressing player contracts and salaries, and has occasionally threatened strike action to secure player rights.

== Role and representation ==
MyPlayers functions as a players' union and negotiates on behalf of its members with SA Rugby (formerly the South African Rugby Union) and provincial unions. It has been involved in developing policies around salary caps, match scheduling, and player rest protocols.

During the COVID-19 pandemic, MyPlayers collaborated with SA Rugby and other stakeholders on the Rugby Industry Financial Impact Plan, aimed at managing reduced revenues and securing employment stability for players.

== Activities ==
=== Collective bargaining and welfare ===
MyPlayers participates in updates to the South African Rugby Industry Collective Agreement (SARICA), covering employment conditions, insurance policies, and post-retirement transition support. The organisation has also advocated for improved travel standards for players on international tours.

=== Player awards ===
MyPlayers hosts the annual Players' Choice Awards, voted on by players across men's fifteens, women's rugby, and sevens formats. Categories include Men's Fifteens Players' Player of the Year, Men's Sevens Players' Player of the Year, and Women's Players' Player of the Year.

=== Community engagement ===
MyPlayers collaborates with external organisations, including the Chris Burger Petro Jackson Players' Fund, to support players affected by injury or post-career transitions.

== Player welfare concerns ==
Reports have highlighted mental health concerns among professional rugby players in South Africa, with MyPlayers sharing data showing high levels of anxiety and sleep disorders among members. This has led to advocacy for improved mental health services and workload management.
