= Elinor-Plum King =

NZ international rugby union player

- Born: 1 June 2004 (age 22) Ongaonga, New Zealand
- Height: 1.70 m (5 ft 7 in)
- Weight: 72 kg (159 lb)

Rugby union career
- Position: Loose forward
Provincial / State sides
Years	Team	Apps	(Points)
2021–2025	Manawatu	32	(40)
Super Rugby
Years	Team	Apps	(Points)
2024–2025	Hurricanes Poua	12	(15)
2026–	Matatū	7	(15)
International career
Years	Team	Apps	(Points)
2026–	New Zealand	7	(15)

Elinor-Plum King (born 1 June 2004) is a New Zealand rugby union player who plays for Matatū in the Super Rugby Aupiki competition. She made her international debut for the Black Ferns in 2026.

== Rugby career ==
King made her Farah Palmer Cup debut for Manawatū in 2021, while at high school. She made her Super Rugby Aupiki debut for the Hurricanes Poua in 2024. King joined Matatū for the 2026 Super Rugby Aupiki season. She had a breakout season, scoring a hat-trick on debut. She received the clubs player of the player for 2026.

== International career ==
After her Matatū season, King was selected in the Black Ferns for the WXV Global Series, making her test debut against Australia on 22 August 2026. She quickly established herself as a regular in the starting side, starting all seven of her test appearances during the season.

King impressed throughout the year with her physicality, defensive work and presence at the breakdown. In her second test match, against South Africa on 5 September, she was named Player of the Match after scoring two tries in New Zealand's 52–20 victory.

King's outstanding performances throughout the 2026 international season were recognised when she was nominated for the 2026 World Rugby Women's 15s Breakthrough Player of the Year. She received the award following the Black Ferns' victory over France in Christchurch on 31 October 2026, capping off an outstanding debut season.
