= Shiniqwa Lamprecht =

South African rugby sevens player

- Born: 24 April 2003 (age 23)
- Height: 170 cm (5 ft 7 in)
- Weight: 74 kg (163 lb; 11 st 9 lb)

Rugby union career
- Position(s): Centre (15s), Flyhalf (7s), Prop (7s)
Senior career
| Years | Team | Apps | (Points) |
| 2023–present | Bulls Daisies | | |
| 2026 | Kolkata Banga Tigers | | |
International career
| Years | Team | Apps | (Points) |
| 2026– | South Africa | 3 | (0) |
- Correct as of 6 September 2026
National sevens team
| Years | Team | | Comps |
| 2023–present | South Africa | | |

Shiniqwa Lamprecht (born 24 April 2003) is a South African rugby sevens player.

Lamprecht was a member of the South African women's sevens team that competed at the 2024 Summer Olympics in Paris. She was initially listed as a traveling reserve but played in the match for eleventh place against Fiji.
