= Maria Tshiremba =

South African rugby union and sevens player

- Born: 29 December 1995 (age 30)
- Height: 167 cm (5 ft 6 in)
- Weight: 65 kg (143 lb; 10 st 3 lb)

Rugby union career
- Position: Wing
Senior career
Years	Team	Apps	(Points)
2023–present	Bulls Daisies		
International career
Years	Team	Apps	(Points)
2026–	South Africa	1	(15)
- Correct as of 15 August 2025
National sevens team
Years	Team		Comps
2023–present	South Africa		

Maria Tshiremba (born 29 December 1995) is a South African rugby player.

== Rugby career ==
Tshiremba was a member of the South African women's sevens team that competed at the 2024 Summer Olympics in Paris.

She was later named in South Africa's fifteens squad for the 2024 WXV 2 tournament.
