= Xoliswa Khuzwayo =

South African rugby union player

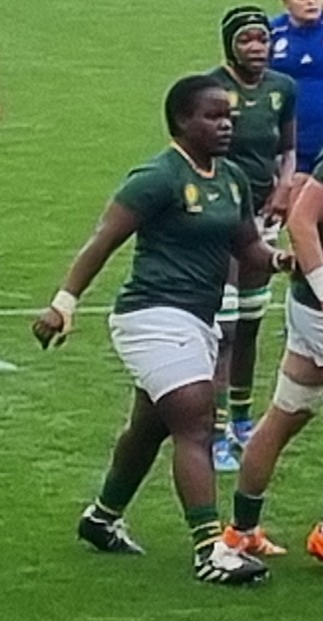
- 2025 Rugby World Cup in Northampton
- Born: 17 June 1999 (age 27)
- Height: 165 cm (5 ft 5 in)
- Weight: 90 kg (198 lb)

Rugby union career
- Position: Prop
Senior career
Years	Team	Apps	(Points)
2019–	Golden Lions		(0)
International career
Years	Team	Apps	(Points)
2024–	South Africa	9	(0)
- Correct as of 20 October 2025

Xoliswa Khuzwayo (born 17 June 1999), is a South African international rugby union player playing as a prop.

== Biography ==
Xoliswa Khuzwayo was born 17 June 1999.

In 2025, she plays for the Golden Lions. On 9 August 2025, she was named in South Africa's squad to the Women's Rugby World Cup.
