= Anacadia Minnaar =

- Born: 4 August 2000 (age 26) Middelburg, South Africa

Rugby union career
- Position: Scrumhalf
- Current team: EP Queens
International career
Years	Team	Apps	(Points)
2019–	South Africa	3	(3)
- Correct as of 18 May 2026
National sevens team
Years	Team		Comps
- South Africa

Anacadia Minnaar (born 4 August 2000) is a South African rugby sevens player. She competed for South Africa at the 2022 Commonwealth Games in Birmingham where they finished in seventh place.

She made her début in Springbok Women in 2019 at test in two tests against Scotland.
