= Vainah Ubisi =

South African rugby union player

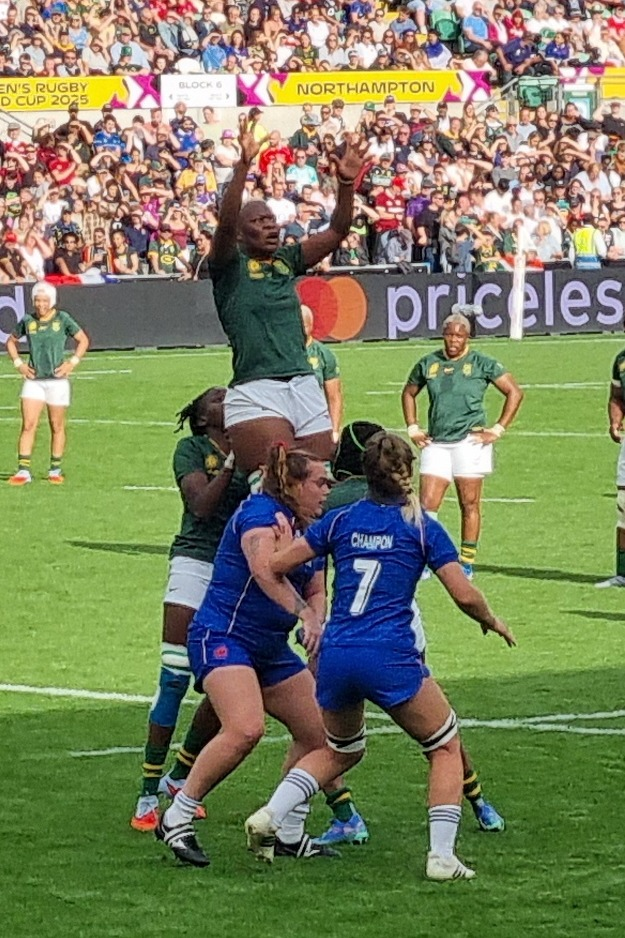
- 2025 Women's Rugby World Cup
- Born: 20 February 2002 (age 24) Moletjie Leokama, Limpopo
- Height: 170 cm (5 ft 7 in)
- Weight: 71 kg (157 lb)

Rugby union career
- Position: Lock
- Current team: Bulls Daisies
Senior career
Years	Team	Apps	(Points)
–2023	Limpopo Bulls		
2023–	Bulls Daisies		
International career
Years	Team	Apps	(Points)
2023–	South Africa	22	(15)
- Correct as of 10 November 2025

Vainah Ubisi (born 20 February 2003), is a South African international rugby union player whose regular playing position is at Lock.

== Biography ==
Ubisi was born on 20 February 2003 in Moletjie Leokama in Limpopo.

She made her international debut for the Springbok Women against Spain in Madrid. She was selected in the squad to the 2025 Women's Rugby World Cup that was held in England.

== Honours ==
- 2024 MyPlayers Women's Players' Player.
