= Anathi Qolo =

South African rugby union player

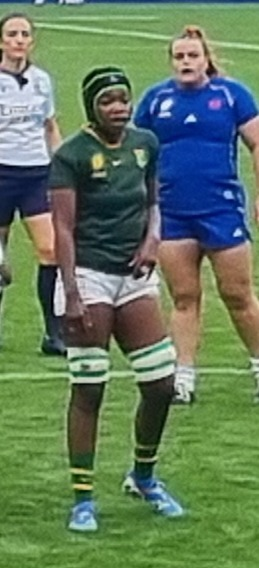
- Born: 21 February 1998 (age 28) Queenstown, South Africa
- Height: 175 cm (5 ft 9 in)
- Weight: 80 kg (176 lb)

Rugby union career
- Position: Lock
Senior career
Years	Team	Apps	(Points)
2019–2022	Blue Bulls Women		
2023–	Bulls Daisies		
International career
Years	Team	Apps	(Points)
2023–	South Africa	11	(5)
- Correct as of 22 September 2025

Anathi Qolo (21 born February 1998 in Queenstown, South Africa), is a South African international rugby union player playing in the lock.

== Biography ==
Anathi Qolo was born on 21 February 1998 in Queenstown, South Africa.

In 2025, she plays for the Bulls Daisies. She was named in the Springbok Women's squad to the 2025 Women's Rugby World Cup that will be held in England.
