= Byrhandré Dolf =

South African rugby union and sevens player

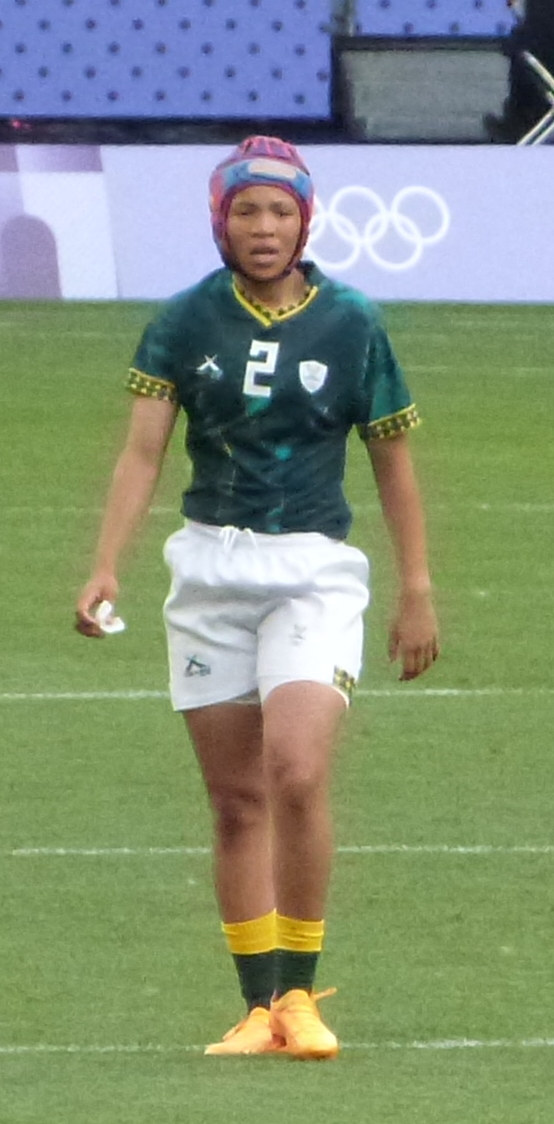
- Dolf in 2024
- Full name: Byrhandré Leigh-She Dolf
- Born: 4 July 2003 (age 23) Uitenhage, South Africa
- Height: 169 cm (5 ft 7 in)
- Weight: 62 kg (137 lb; 9 st 11 lb)

Rugby union career
- Position(s): Flyhalf, Fullback
Senior career
Years	Team	Apps	(Points)
2023–present	Bulls Daisies		
International career
Years	Team	Apps	(Points)
2022	South Africa U20		
2023–	South Africa	26	(64)
- Correct as of 14 September 2025
National sevens team
Years	Team		Comps
2023–	South Africa		4

Byrhandré Leigh-She Dolf (born 4 July 2003) is a South African rugby union and sevens player. She competed at the 2024 Paris Olympics.

== Career ==
Dolf made her debut for the Springbok women's team in 2023. She also made her debut for the sevens team in December of that year at the Cape Town SVNS.

She was a member of the South African women's sevens team that competed at the 2024 Summer Olympics in Paris. In September that year she was called into South Africa's fifteens squad for the 2024 WXV 2 tournament.

On 9 August 2025, she was named in the Springbok women's squad to the Women's Rugby World Cup in England.

== Honours ==
South Africa

- MyPlayers Players' Choice Awards
  - Women’s Players’ Player of the Year 2025
- SA Rugby Awards
  - SA Rugby Young Women’s Player of the Year: 2025
