= Nomsa Mokwai =

South African rugby union player

- Born: 30 August 1992 (age 34)
- Height: 172 cm (5 ft 8 in)
- Weight: 68 kg (150 lb)
- Occupation: Professional nurse

Rugby union career
- Position(s): lock flanker
Senior career
Years	Team	Apps	(Points)
2025–	Western Province		
International career
Years	Team	Apps	(Points)
2019–	South Africa	14	(0)
- Correct as of 18 November 2025

Nomsa Mokwai (born 30 August 1992), is a South African international rugby union player, playing as a lock and flanker.

== Biography ==
Nomsa Mokwai was born on 30 August 1992.

In 2025, she plays for Western Province. She was named in the Springbok Women's squad to the 2025 Women's Rugby World Cup that will be held in England.

Nomsa is professional nurse at the Netcare Christiaan Barnard Memorial Hospital.
