= Chryss Viliko =

New Zealand rugby union player (born 2000)

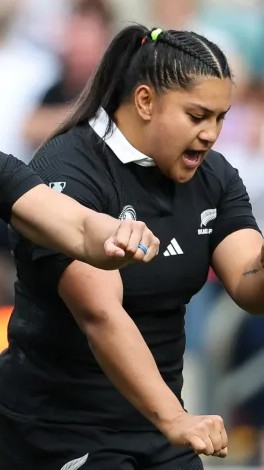
- 2025 Women's Rugby World Cup
- Born: 25 December 2000 (age 25)
- Height: 1.68 m (5 ft 6 in)
- Weight: 97 kg (214 lb)

Rugby union career
- Position(s): Prop, Hooker
Provincial / State sides
Years	Team	Apps	(Points)
2019–	Auckland Storm	30	(15)
Super Rugby
Years	Team	Apps	(Points)
2022–	Blues Women	25	(10)
International career
Years	Team	Apps	(Points)
2023–	New Zealand	29	(25)
Medal record
Women's rugby union
Representing New Zealand
World Cup
Bronze medal – third place	2025 England	Team competition

Chryss Viliko (born 25 December 2000) is a New Zealand rugby union player. She plays for the Blues Women in the Super Rugby Aupiki competition.

== Biography ==
Viliko attended Onehunga High School in Auckland. She made her debut for Auckland in the Farah Palmer Cup in 2018. She also plays for Marist in the Auckland club competition. She missed most of the 2021 Farah Palmer Cup season due to her recovery from an ACL knee reconstruction.

=== 2021–22 ===
Viliko attended a Black Ferns High Performance camp in October 2021. On 3 November, Viliko was named in the Blues squad for the inaugural Super Rugby Aupiki competition. She was named on the Blues bench for their first game against Matatū, they won 21–10. She also featured in their 0–35 thrashing by the Chiefs Manawa in the final round.

In July 2022, Viliko attended the Black Ferns trial in Pukekohe. She played for the Rawata team against Ngalingali at the Navigation Homes Stadium.

=== 2023–25 ===
Viliko joined the Black Ferns 2023 training squad for four months as an injury replacement for Awhina Tangen-Wainohu, who is out due to a neck injury. She made her test debut on 30 September against the Wallaroos at Hamilton.

In July 2025, she was named in the Black Ferns side to the Women's Rugby World Cup in England.
