= Maceala Samboya =

South African rugby union player

- Born: Maceala Jaida Samboya; 30 July 1999 (age 27) Malmesbury, South Africa
- Height: 158 cm (5 ft 2 in)
- Weight: 60 kg (132 lb)

Rugby union career
- Position: Wing
Senior career
Years	Team	Apps	(Points)
2023–	Boland Dames		
International career
Years	Team	Apps	(Points)
2023–	South Africa	7	(20)
- Correct as of 14 September 2025
National sevens team
Years	Team		Comps
2026–	South Africa		1

Maceala Jaida Samboya (born 30 July 1999), is a South African international rugby union player playing as a winger.

== Biography ==
Maceala Samboya was born on 30 July 1999.

In 2025, she plays for Boland Dames. She was named in the Springbok Women's squad to the 2025 Women's Rugby World Cup that will be held in England.

Samboya made her international sevens debut in the Uruguay tournament of the 2026 SVNS 2.
