= Catha Jacobs =

South African rugby union and sevens player

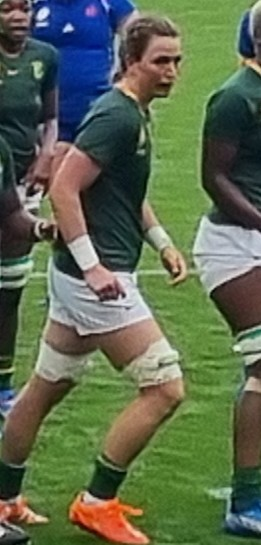
- Born: 2 June 1998 (age 28)
- Height: 181 cm (5 ft 11 in)
- Weight: 80 kg (176 lb)
- University: University of Johannesburg

Rugby union career
- Current team: Golden Lions Women
Senior career
Years	Team	Apps	(Points)
2022–2023	Saracens	20	(5)
2023–2023	Bulls Daisies		
2023–2024	Leicester Tigers	13	(5)
2026–	Golden Lions		
International career
Years	Team	Apps	(Points)
2021–	South Africa	26	(5)
- Correct as of 14 September 2025
National sevens team
Years	Team		Comps
2019–	South Africa		19 (5 pts)

Catha Jacobs (born 2 June 1998) is a South African international rugby union and international rugby sevens player playing in the positions of second row, flanker and center flanker in XV.

== Biography ==
Catharina Jacobs was born on 2 June 1998. She tried rugby with the boys at primary school, but the headmaster explained to her that it was not allowed by the rules. She did not touch a rugby ball for years. She then practiced rowing up to the professional level.

It was at the University of Johannesburg that she reconnected with rugby sevens. She was quickly detected, but the COVID-19 pandemic put a stop to everything. When sports activities resumed, she decided to try rugby union.

She earned her first cap with the South African team against Kenya and then in the fall of 2021 she went on tour in Europe with the Boks. Before leaving, she received an email from Saracens who simply offered her to join them at the end of the tour. She joined the London team in January 2022, and took part in the victorious Premiership campaign. However, she admits that she found it very difficult to adapt to this new life away from home.

She had seven caps for South Africa when she was selected in September 2022 to play in the World Cup in New Zealand.

In June 2023, she was loaned to the Bulls Daisies to play in the Women's Premier Division.

From the 2023–2024 season, wishing to increase her playing time, she decided to join the Leicester Tigers. Then, she was selected to compete in the first edition of the WXV 2.

In 2024–2025, she was again called up to the national team for the WXV 2.

She was named in the Springbok Women's squad to the 2025 Women's Rugby World Cup that will be held in England.
