= Sizophila Solontsi =

South African rugby union and sevens player

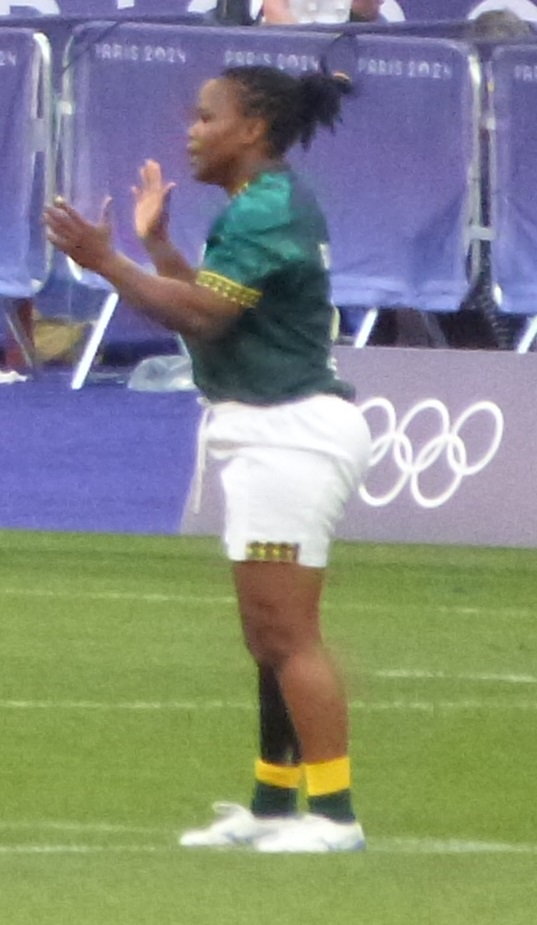
- Solontsi at the 2024 Summer Olympics.
- Born: 9 March 1992 (age 34)
- Height: 1.62 m (5 ft 4 in)
- Weight: 74 kg (163 lb)

Rugby union career
- Position: Back Row
Senior career
Years	Team	Apps	(Points)
–2023	Sharks Women		(0)
2023–	Bulls Daisies		(0)
International career
Years	Team	Apps	(Points)
2019–	South Africa	32	(50)
- Correct as of 14 September 2025
National sevens team
Years	Team		Comps
2018–	South Africa		12 (5 pts)

Sizophila Solontsi (born 9 March 1992) is a South African rugby sevens player. She has represented South Africa internationally in rugby sevens and fifteens.

== Rugby career ==
Solontsi represented South Africa at the 2022 Rugby World Cup Sevens in Cape Town. She was also named in South Africa's women's fifteens team for the Rugby World Cup in New Zealand.

She was a member of the South African sevens side that competed at the 2024 Summer Olympics in Paris. In September, she was named in the Springbok women's squad for the 2024 WXV 2 tournament.

On 9 August 2025, she was named in South Africa's squad to the Women's Rugby World Cup.
