= Nombuyekezo Mdliki =

South African rugby union player

- Born: 19 March 2002 (age 24)
- Height: 160 cm (5 ft 3 in)
- Weight: 97 kg (214 lb)

Rugby union career
- Position: Prop
Senior career
Years	Team	Apps	(Points)
	Border Ladies		(0)
International career
Years	Team	Apps	(Points)
2024–	South Africa	9	(0)
- Correct as of 9 November 2025

Nombuyekezo Mdliki (born 19 March 2002) is a South African international rugby union player, playing as a prop.

== Biography ==
Nombuyekezo Mdliki was born on 19 March 2002.

In 2025, she plays for the Border Ladies. She was named in the Springbok Women's squad to the 2025 Women's Rugby World Cup that will be held in England.
