= Lindelwa Gwala =

South African rugby union player (born 1997)

- Born: 24 August 1997 (age 29)
- Height: 168 cm (5 ft 6 in)
- Weight: 79 kg (174 lb)

Rugby union career
- Position: Hooker
Senior career
Years	Team	Apps	(Points)
	Sharks		(0)
2023–2025	Trailfinders Women		
International career
Years	Team	Apps	(Points)
2021–	South Africa	38	(75)
- Correct as of 14 September 2025

Lindelwa Gwala (born 24 August 1997) is a South African international rugby union player, playing as a hooker.

== Biography ==
Lindelwa Gwala was born on 24 August 1997. In 2022, she plays for the Sharks club in Durban. She had 18 caps for the national team when she was selected in September 2022 to play for her country in the World Cup in New Zealand.

She was named in the Springbok Women's squad to the 2025 Women's Rugby World Cup that will be held in England.
