= Sanelisiwe Charlie =

South African rugby union and sevens player

- Born: 1 May 2000 (age 26)
- Height: 163 cm (5 ft 4 in)
- Weight: 95 kg (209 lb)

Rugby union career
- Position: Prop
- Current team: Bulls Daisies
Senior career
Years	Team	Apps	(Points)
2024–	Bulls Daisies		(0)
International career
Years	Team	Apps	(Points)
2021–	South Africa	29	(10)
- Correct as of 14 September 2025

Sanelisiwe Charlie (born 1 May 2000) is a South African international rugby union player, playing as a prop.

== Biography ==
Sanelisiwe Charlie was born on 1 May 2000. In 2022 she plays for the Eastern Province Elephants club in Gqeberha. She had only 4 caps for the national team when she was selected in September 2022 to play for her country in the Rugby World Cup in New Zealand.

She was named in the Springbok Women's squad to the 2025 Women's Rugby World Cup that will be held in England.
