= Yonela Ngxingolo =

South African rugby union player

- Born: 3 March 1998 (age 28)
- Height: 161 cm (5 ft 3 in)
- Weight: 84 kg (185 lb; 13 st 3 lb)

Rugby union career
- Position: Prop
- Current team: Bulls Daisies
Senior career
Years	Team	Apps	(Points)
2023–	Bulls Daisies		(0)
International career
Years	Team	Apps	(Points)
2018–	South Africa	49	(20)
- Correct as of 13 October 2026

Yonela Ngxingolo (born 3 March 1998) is a South African rugby union player. She competed for South Africa in the 2021 and 2025 Women's Rugby World Cups.

== Rugby career ==
In 2022, Ngxingolo played for the Border Bulldogs club in East London, South Africa. She already had 18 test caps when she was selected in September 2022 to play for South Africa in the delayed 2021 Rugby World Cup in New Zealand.

She was named in the Springbok Women's squad to the 2025 Women's Rugby World Cup that was held in England.
