= South Africa women's national rugby union team =

South African women's rugby union team

South Africa
- Nickname: Springbok Women
- Emblem: Springbok
- Union: South African Rugby Union
- Head coach: Laurian Johannes-Haupt; Franzel September
- Captain: Babalwa Latsha
- Most caps: Nolusindiso Booi (55)
First colours	Second colours

World Rugby ranking
- Current: 10 (as of 2 November 2026)
- Highest: 9 (26 October 2026)
- Lowest: 24 (2004)

First international
- South Africa 5–8 Wales (Port Elizabeth, South Africa; 29 May 2004)

Biggest win
- South Africa 128–3 Namibia (Cape Town, South Africa; 23 June 2022)

Biggest defeat
- England 101–0 South Africa (East Molesey, England; 14 May 2005)

World Cup
- Appearances: 5 (First in 2006)
- Best result: Quarter-finals (2025)
- Website: www.sarugby.co.za

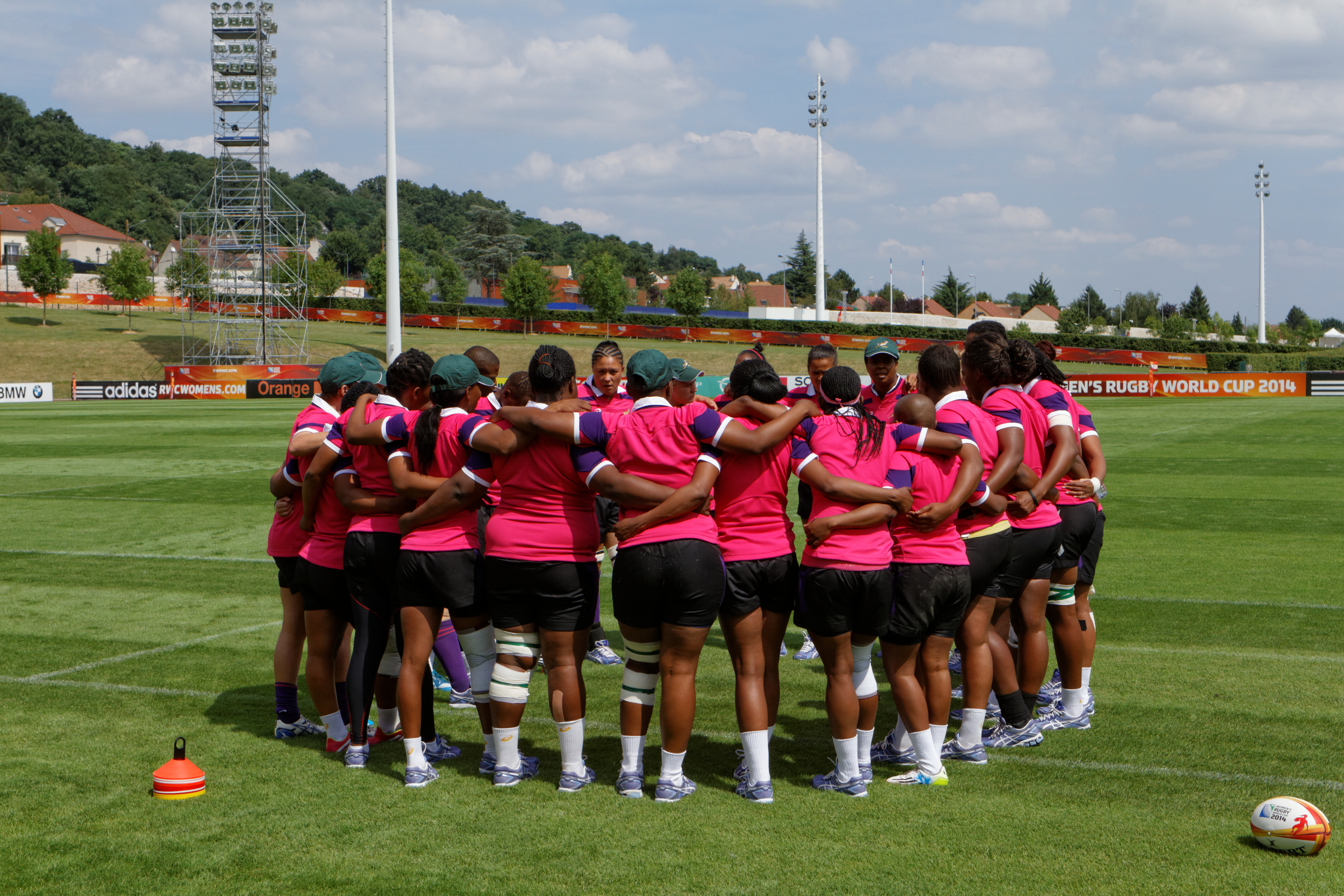
South Africa at the 2014 Women's Rugby World Cup

The South Africa women's national rugby union team represents South Africa in women's international rugby union and is governed by the South African Rugby Union. They have appeared in five World Cups since their debut in the 2006 Women's Rugby World Cup.

== History ==
The Springbok Women played their first Test in 2004. They have won the Rugby Africa Women's Cup twice — in 2019 and 2022. South Africa climbed to eleventh place on the World Rugby ranking in September 2022 with wins over Japan and Spain.

They made their maiden knockout round when they made the quarterfinals at the 2025 Women's Rugby World Cup.

== Players ==
=== Current squad ===
On 12 July 2026, South Africa named a 49-player squad ahead of their the Black Ferns and WXV.

- Caps updated: 5 September 2026 (after South Africa v New Zealand)

Player	Position	Date of birth (age)	Caps	Club/province
Lindelwa Gwala	Hooker	24 August 1997 (aged 28)	43	(South Africa) Sharks
Anushka Groenewald	Hooker		13	(South Africa) Western Province
Micke Günter	Hooker	25 October 1998 (aged 27)	20	(England) Leicester Tigers
Jada Davids	Hooker		0	(South Africa) Western Province
Roseline Botes	Hooker	25 November 1999 (aged 26)	27	(South Africa) Western Province
Sanelisiwe Charlie	Prop	1 May 2000 (aged 26)	35	(South Africa) Bulls Daisies
Xoliswa Khuzwayo	Prop	17 June 1999 (aged 27)	16	(South Africa) Golden Lions
Yonela Ngxingolo	Prop	3 March 1998 (aged 28)	49	(South Africa) Bulls Daisies
Anuschka Ekron	Prop		3	(South Africa) Western Province
Babalwa Latsha	Prop	31 March 1994 (aged 32)	47	(South Africa) Western Province
Nombuyekezo Mdliki	Prop	19 March 2002 (aged 24)	19	(South Africa) Border Ladies
Thandile Mazwi	Prop		4	(South Africa) Western Province
Anothando Katshwa	Prop		0	(South Africa) Western Province
Vainah Ubisi	Lock	20 February 2003 (aged 23)	30	(South Africa) Bulls Daisies
Nomsa Mokwai	Lock	30 August 1992 (aged 33)	22	(South Africa) Western Province
Zethu Gcaza	Lock		1	(South Africa) Border Ladies
Danelle Lochner	Lock	16 May 1997 (aged 29)	27	(England) Harlequins
Anathi Qolo	Lock	21 February 1998 (aged 28)	15	(South Africa) Bulls Daisies
Abigail Smit	Lock		1	(South Africa) Western Province
Sizophila Solontsi	Back row	9 March 1992 (aged 34)	39	(South Africa) Bulls Daisies
Sinelitha Noxeke	Back row	19 March 2002 (aged 24)	10	(South Africa) Bulls Daisies
Faith Tshauke	Back row	16 December 1995 (aged 30)	7	(South Africa) Bulls Daisies
Palesa Matee	Back row		0	(South Africa) Maties Women
Ntsako Mbombi	Back row		3	(South Africa) Golden Lions
Lerato Makua	Back row	7 December 1999 (aged 26)	22	(South Africa) Bulls Daisies
Catha Jacobs	Back row	2 June 1998 (aged 28)	34	(France) RC Toulon PM
Nobuhle Mjwara	Back row		6	(South Africa) Sharks
Logan Welman	Number 8		9	(South Africa) Western Province
Aseza Hele	Number 8	26 November 1994 (aged 31)	38	(South Africa) Boland Dames
Unam Tose	Scrum-half	3 May 2000 (aged 26)	34	(South Africa) Bulls Daisies
Anacadia Minnaar	Scrum-half	4 August 2000 (aged 25)	9	(South Africa) EP Queens
Insaaf Levy	Scrum-half		2	(South Africa) Western Province
Felicia Jacobs	Scrum-half	7 April 1998 (aged 28)	11	(South Africa) Boland Dames
Mary Zulu	Scrum-half	6 December 2002 (aged 23)	19	(South Africa) Sharks Women
Libbie Janse van Rensburg	Fly-half	28 September 1994 (aged 31)	35	(South Africa) Bulls Daisies
Eloise Webb	Fly-half	5 March 1996 (aged 30)	20	(South Africa) Boland Dames
Hayley Hardneck	Fly-half		0	(South Africa) Boland Dames
Aphiwe Ngwevu	Centre	14 May 1998 (aged 28)	39	(South Africa) Border Ladies
Shiniqwa Lamprecht	Centre	24 April 2003 (aged 23)	5	South Africa 7s
Ayanda Malinga	Centre	23 June 1998 (aged 28)	20	(South Africa) Bulls Daisies
Zintle Mpupha	Centre	25 December 1993 (aged 32)	32	(South Africa) Bulls Daisies
Isabella Nel	Centre		0	Unattached
Jané Mulder	Centre	21 June 2005 (aged 21)	0	South Africa 7s
Naima Hlatshwayo	Centre	25 October 2005 (aged 20)	3	(South Africa) Bulls Daisies
Alichia Arries	Wing	2 May 2002 (aged 24)	12	(South Africa) Western Province
Jakkie Cilliers	Wing	30 October 2000 (aged 25)	29	(South Africa) Bulls Daisies
Maria Tshiremba	Wing	29 December 1995 (aged 30)	3	(South Africa) Bulls Daisies
Maceala Samboya	Wing	30 July 1999 (aged 26)	14	(South Africa) Boland Dames
Patience Mokone	Wing		7	(South Africa) Bulls Daisies
Shaunique Alexander	Wing	12 July 2003 (aged 23)	2	(South Africa) Bulls Daisies
Thobile Msizazwe	Wing		0	(South Africa) Bulls Daisies
Byrhandré Dolf	Fullback	4 July 2003 (aged 23)	33	(South Africa) Bulls Daisies

== Crew ==
Head coach	TBA
Assistant coaches	Laurian Johannes-Haupt; Franzel September
Team manager	Thandiswa Nxomani
Team doctor	Dr Dhavina Naidoo-Jewkes
Physiotherapists	Neda Isaacs
Conditioning coach	Naasier Parker
Analyst	Robyn Bam
Laws Adviser	Aimee Barrett-Theron

== Results ==
For the full list of all Springbok Women matches:

=== World Ranking ===
Rugby World Ranking per year end

World Ranking
Year	Ranking	Points	Matches	Won	Lost	Draw	ΣMatches	ΣWon	ΣLost	ΣDraw
2004	26	46	2	-	2	-	2	-	2	-
2005	24	48	2	1	1	-	4	1	3	-
2006	21	53.99	7	2	5	-	11	3	8	-
2007	21	53.99	-	-	-	-	11	3	8	-
2008	21	53.99	-	-	-	-	11	3	8	-
2009	20	54.99	4	-	3	1	15	3	11	1
2010	11	69.06	9	6	3	-	24	9	14	1
2011	10	70.72	4	1	3	-	28	10	17	1
2012	11	70.72	-	-	-	-	28	10	17	1
2013	11	70.72	5	1	4	-	33	11	21	1
2014	12	68.51	6	1	5	-	39	12	26	1
2015	12	68.51	-	-	-	-	39	12	26	1
2016	12	68.51	-	-	-	-	39	12	26	1
2017	13	68.51	-	-	-	-	39	12	26	1
2018	12	67.98	3	-	3	-	42	12	29	1
2019	14	63.39	6	3	3	-	48	15	32	1
2020	13	63.39	-	-	-	-	48	15	32	1
2021	13	63.39	4	2	2	-	52	17	34	1
2022	13	64.50	-	-	-	-	52	17	34	1
Total	-	-	52	17	34	1		33%	67%	0%

=== World Cup results ===
Women's World Rugby Rankings Top 20 rankings as of 6 April 2026
Rank	Change*	Team	Points
1	Steady	England	98.09
2	Steady	Canada	91.53
3	Steady	New Zealand	89.85
4	Steady	France	83.60
5	Steady	Ireland	78.20
6	Steady	Scotland	77.39
7	Steady	Australia	75.46
8	Steady	United States	72.90
9	Steady	Italy	72.37
10	Steady	South Africa	71.62
11	Steady	Japan	69.72
12	Steady	Wales	66.13
13	Steady	Fiji	63.98
14	Steady	Spain	62.42
15	Steady	Samoa	59.72
16	Steady	Hong Kong	57.56
17	Steady	Netherlands	57.42
18	Steady	Russia	55.10
19	Steady	Kazakhstan	53.88
20	▲1	Germany	51.10
*Change from the previous week

Rugby World Cup
Year	Round	Position	GP	W	D	L	PF	PA
South Africa was not invited to any of the World Cups between 1991 and 2002
(Canada) 2006	Ninth play-off	12th	5	0	0	5	30	258
(England) 2010	Ninth play-off	10th	5	2	0	3	60	166
(France) 2014	Plate semi-final	10th	5	1	0	4	34	176
(Ireland) 2017	Did Not Enter							
(New Zealand) 2021 (Note: Due to the Global Covid pandemic this World Cup took place in 2022)	Pool Stage	—	3	0	0	3	22	136
(England) 2025	Quarter-final	—	4	2	0	2	122	133
(Australia) 2029	TBD							
(United States) 2033	TBD							
Total	5/10	10th^{†}	22	5	0	17	268	869
Champion Runner-up Third place Fourth place: * Tied placing ^{†} Best placing / Home venue

=== Results summary ===
See also List of South Africa women's national rugby union team matches

Full Internationals per country (Correct to 31 October 2026)
Opponent	First game	Played	Won	Drawn	Lost	Percentage
Australia	2006	4	0	0	4	0%
Brazil	2025	1	1	0	0	100%
Cameroon	2023	2	2	0	0	100%
Canada	2009	6	0	0	6	0%
England	2005	6	0	0	6	0%
Fiji	2022	3	2	0	1	66.67%
France	2009	6	0	1	5	0%
Ireland	2006	3	0	0	3	0%
Italy	2018	5	2	0	3	40%
Japan	2022	3	2	0	1	66.67%
Kazakhstan	2006	4	3	0	1	75%
Kenya	2019	7	7	0	0	100%
Madagascar	2019	4	4	0	0	100%
Namibia	2022	1	1	0	0	100%
Netherlands	2006	2	2	0	0	100%
New Zealand	2010	3	0	0	3	0%
Samoa	2006	3	1	1	1	66.67%
Scotland	2010	5	2	0	3	40%
Spain	2014	10	7	0	3	77.78%
Uganda	2013	3	3	0	0	100%
United States	2009	8	2	0	6	25%
Wales	2004	9	2	0	7	22.22%
Zimbabwe	2022	1	1	0	0	100%
Summary	2004	97	42	1	50	43.75%

== See also ==
Players

- Lerato Makua
- Zintle Mpupha
- Simamkele Namba
- Nadine Roos
- Snenhlanhla Shozi
- Sizophila Solontsi
- Nomsebenzi Tsotsobe
- Eloise Webb
- Mandisa Williams
