= 2024 Pacific Four Series squads =

The 2024 Pacific Four Series is the 4th edition of the Pacific Four Series, an annual rugby union competition sanctioned by World Rugby and contested by the national teams of Australia, Canada, New Zealand and the United States. New Zealand have won two titles — 2022 and 2023, and are the defending champions.

Note: Number of caps are indicated as of the first match of the tournament (28 April 2024).

== Australia ==
Jo Yapp announced the Wallaroos 30-member squad to the Pacific Four Series on 30 April.

Player	Position	Date of birth (age)	Caps	Club/province
Hera-Barb Malcolm Heke	Hooker	29 January 2000 (aged 24)	0	(Australia) Western Force
Ashley Marsters	Hooker	2 November 1993 (aged 30)	26	(Australia) Melbourne Rebels
Tania Naden	Hooker	20 February 1992 (aged 32)	10	(Australia) ACT Brumbies
Sally Fuesaina	Prop	15 February 1992 (aged 32)	0	(Australia) ACT Brumbies
Brianna Hoy	Prop	7 July 2000 (aged 23)	3	(Australia) NSW Waratahs
Asoiva Karpani	Prop	18 June 1996 (aged 27)	21	(Australia) NSW Waratahs
Bridie O'Gorman	Prop	8 December 1998 (aged 25)	17	(Australia) NSW Waratahs
Allana Sikimeti	Prop	2 July 2004 (aged 19)	0	(Australia) ACT Brumbies
Atasi Lafai	Lock	24 July 1994 (aged 29)	9	(Australia) NSW Waratahs
Kaitlan Leaney	Lock	10 October 2000 (aged 23)	15	(Australia) NSW Waratahs
Michaela Leonard (c)	Lock	6 March 1995 (aged 29)	22	(Australia) Western Force
Piper Duck	Flanker	2 April 2001 (aged 23)	10	(Australia) NSW Waratahs
Tiarah Minns	Flanker	6 April 2001 (aged 23)	0	(Australia) Melbourne Rebels
Leilani Nathan	Flanker	20 July 2000 (aged 23)	2	(Australia) NSW Waratahs
Siokapesi Palu	Flanker	15 October 1996 (aged 27)	6	(Australia) ACT Brumbies
Lydia Kavoa	Number 8	8 November 1993 (aged 30)	0	(Australia) ACT Brumbies
Tabua Tuinakauvadra	Back row	27 December 2002 (aged 21)	4	(Australia) ACT Brumbies
Layne Morgan	Scrum-half	20 April 1999 (aged 25)	19	(Australia) NSW Waratahs
Samantha Wood	Scrum-half	17 July 2004 (aged 19)	0	(Australia) Western Force
Arabella McKenzie	Fly-half	1 March 1999 (aged 25)	21	(Australia) NSW Waratahs
Faitala Moleka	Fly-half	29 January 2005 (aged 19)	6	(Australia) ACT Brumbies
Georgina Friedrichs	Centre	14 April 1995 (aged 29)	19	(Australia) NSW Waratahs
Trilleen Pomare	Centre	5 April 1993 (aged 31)	24	(Australia) Western Force
Shalom Sauaso	Centre	2008 (aged 16)	0	(Australia) Queensland Reds
Cecilia Smith	Centre	13 March 1994 (aged 30)	12	(Australia) Queensland Reds
Biola Dawa	Wing	5 November 2000 (aged 23)	0	(Australia) ACT Brumbies
Desirée Miller	Wing	13 January 2002 (aged 22)	2	(Australia) NSW Waratahs
Maya Stewart	Wing	14 March 2000 (aged 24)	8	(Australia) NSW Waratahs
Lori Cramer	Fullback	8 March 1993 (aged 31)	19	(Australia) Queensland Reds
Caitlyn Halse	Utility back	18 September 2006 (aged 17)	0	(Australia) NSW Waratahs

== Canada ==
Kevin Rouet named Canada's 30-player squad to the Pacific Four Series on 12 April. On 26 April, Cassandra Tuffnail was replaced by Mya Brubacher due to a pre-camp injury.

Player	Position	Date of birth (age)	Caps	Club/province
Gillian Boag	Hooker	19 February 1995 (aged 29)	23	(Canada) Capilano RFC
Mya Brubacher	Hooker			(Canada) Kingston Panthers / (Canada) Queen's University
Sara Cline	Hooker	21 May 1997 (aged 26)	2	(Australia) Western Force
Emily Tuttosi	Hooker	21 September 1995 (aged 28)	19	(England) Exeter Chiefs
Olivia DeMerchant	Prop	16 February 1991 (aged 33)	57	(Canada) Halifax Tars RFC
Alexandria Ellis	Prop	1 August 1995 (aged 28)	23	(France) Stade Français
Brittany Kassil	Prop	14 March 1991 (aged 33)	38	(Canada) Guelph RFC
DaLeaka Menin	Prop	16 June 1995 (aged 28)	45	(England) Exeter Chiefs
Tyson Beukeboom	Lock	10 March 1991 (aged 33)	65	(England) Ealing Trailfinders
McKinley Hunt	Lock	5 January 1997 (aged 27)	14	(England) Saracens
Pamphinette Buisa	Back row	28 December 1996 (aged 27)	9	(Canada) Ottawa Irish
Sophie de Goede (c)	Back row	30 June 1999 (aged 24)	24	(England) Saracens
Fabiola Forteza	Back row	4 August 1995 (aged 28)	20	(France) Stade Bordelais
Courtney Holtkamp	Back row	25 April 1999 (aged 25)	28	(Canada) Red Deer Titans Rugby
Julia Omokhuale	Back row	9 July 2001 (aged 22)		(England) Leicester Tigers
Laetitia Royer	Back row	9 February 1991 (aged 33)		(France) ASM Romagnat
Gabrielle Senft	Back row	13 June 1997 (aged 26)	18	(France) Stade Bordelais
Sara Svoboda	Back row	3 February 1995 (aged 29)	21	(England) Loughborough Lightning
Olivia Apps	Scrum-half	1 December 1998 (aged 25)	1	(Canada) Lindsay RFC
Justine Pelletier	Scrum-half	27 February 2001 (aged 23)	18	(France) Stade Bordelais
Claire Gallagher	Fly-half	2001 (aged 23)	4	(England) Leicester Tigers
Sarah-Maude Lachance	Fly-half	7 December 1998 (aged 25)	5	(France) Stade Bordelais
Julia Schell	Fly-half	13 July 1996 (aged 27)	9	(England) Ealing Trailfinders
Alexandra Tessier	Fly-half	3 September 1993 (aged 30)	48	(England) Exeter Chiefs
Fancy Bermudez	Centre	27 May 2002 (aged 21)	4	(Canada) Westshore RFC
Madison Grant	Centre	12 March 2001 (aged 23)	14	(Canada) Cornwall Claymores
Shoshanah Seumanutafa	Centre	17 September 1999 (aged 24)		(New Zealand) Chiefs Manawa
Paige Farries	Wing	12 August 1994 (aged 29)	27	(England) Saracens
Sabrina Poulin	Wing	3 October 1992 (aged 31)	12	(Canada) Town of Mount Royal RFC
Mahalia Robinson	Fullback			(Canada) Town of Mount Royal RFC

== New Zealand ==
Allan Bunting named the Black Ferns 30-player squad for the series on 1 May.

Player	Position	Date of birth (age)	Caps	Club/province
Luka Connor	Hooker	24 September 1996 (aged 27)	20	(New Zealand) Chiefs Manawa / Bay of Plenty
Georgia Ponsonby	Hooker	14 December 1999 (aged 24)	20	(New Zealand) Matatū / Canterbury
Leaso Grace Gago Tiatia	Hooker	5 May 1998 (aged 25)	1	(New Zealand) Blues / Counties Manukau
Kate Henwood	Prop	28 January 1989 (aged 35)	4	(New Zealand) Chiefs Manawa / Bay of Plenty
Aldora Itunu	Prop	28 June 1991 (aged 32)	24	(New Zealand) Blues / Auckland
Tanya Kalounivale	Prop	20 January 1999 (aged 25)	11	(New Zealand) Chiefs Manawa / Waikato
Marcelle Parkes	Prop	9 September 1997 (aged 26)	5	(New Zealand) Matatū / Canterbury
Amy Rule	Prop	15 July 2000 (aged 23)	19	(New Zealand) Matatū / Canterbury
Chryss Viliko	Prop	25 December 2000 (aged 23)	2	(New Zealand) Blues / Auckland
Alana Bremner	Lock	10 February 1997 (aged 27)	19	(New Zealand) Matatū / Canterbury
Maiakawanakaulani Roos	Lock	27 July 2001 (aged 22)	21	(New Zealand) Blues / Auckland
Charmaine Smith	Lock	15 November 1990 (aged 33)	29	(New Zealand) Chiefs Manawa / Northland
Ma'ama Vaipulu	Lock	26 November 2002 (aged 21)	0	(New Zealand) Blues / Auckland
Kaipo Olsen-Baker	Loose forward	1 May 2002 (aged 21)	2	(New Zealand) Matatū / Manawatū
Layla Sae	Loose forward	22 October 2000 (aged 23)	3	(New Zealand) Hurricanes Poua / Manawatū
Kennedy Simon (cc)	Loose forward	1 October 1996 (aged 27)	20	(New Zealand) Chiefs Manawa / Waikato
Liana Mikaele-Tu'u	Loose forward	2 March 2002 (aged 22)	18	(New Zealand) Blues / Auckland
Iritana Hohaia	Scrum-half	1 March 2000 (aged 24)	6	(New Zealand) Hurricanes Poua / Taranaki
Maia Joseph	Scrum-half	25 May 2002 (aged 21)	0	(New Zealand) Matatū / Otago
Ruahei Demant (cc)	Fly-half	21 April 1995 (aged 29)	33	(New Zealand) Blues / Auckland
Hannah King	Fly-half	13 January 2004 (aged 20)	0	(New Zealand) Hurricanes Poua / Canterbury
Sylvia Brunt	Centre	1 January 2004 (aged 20)	13	(New Zealand) Blues / Auckland
Amy du Plessis	Centre	7 July 1999 (aged 24)	14	(New Zealand) Matatū / Canterbury
Grace Steinmetz	Centre	16 January 1998 (aged 26)	2	(New Zealand) Chiefs Manawa / Canterbury
Monica Tagoai	Centre	17 October 1998 (aged 25)	3	(New Zealand) Hurricanes Poua / Wellington
Renee Holmes	Utility back	21 December 1999 (aged 24)	16	(New Zealand) Chiefs Manawa / Waikato
Patricia Maliepo	Utility back	13 March 2003 (aged 21)	7	(New Zealand) Blues / Auckland
Mererangi Paul	Utility back	29 October 1998 (aged 25)	5	(New Zealand) Chiefs Manawa / Counties Manukau
Ruby Tui	Utility back	13 December 1991 (aged 32)	13	(New Zealand) Chiefs Manawa / Counties Manukau
Katelyn Vaha'akolo	Utility back	18 April 2000 (aged 24)	6	(New Zealand) Blues / Auckland

== United States ==
On 12 April, Sione Fukofuka named 31-players to the Eagles traveling roster for the series. Kate Zackary and Lotte Clapp are expected to join the squad in Australia and New Zealand.

Player	Position	Date of birth (age)	Caps	Club/province
Paige Stathopoulos	Hooker	23 August 1993 (aged 30)	5	(United States) Beantown RFC
Kathryn Treder	Hooker	13 March 1996 (aged 28)	17	(England) Loughborough Lightning
Catie Benson	Prop	10 February 1992 (aged 32)	41	(England) Sale Sharks
Charli Jacoby	Prop	9 October 1989 (aged 34)	25	(Australia) Queensland Reds
Erica Jarrell	Prop	25 February 1999 (aged 25)	6	(England) Sale Sharks
Alivia Leatherman	Prop	9 August 2002 (aged 21)	1	(United States) Notre Dame College
Hope Rogers	Prop	7 January 1993 (aged 31)	44	(England) Exeter Chiefs
Keia Mae Sagapolu	Prop	12 May 2000 (aged 23)	7	(England) Leicester Tigers
Jenny Kronish	Second row	27 December 1996 (aged 27)	13	(United States) Beantown RFC
Hallie Taufo'ou	Second row	26 May 1994 (aged 29)	14	(England) Loughborough Lightning
Samantha Brackett	Flanker		0	(United States) San Clemente Rhinos
Rachel Ehrecke	Flanker	6 December 1999 (aged 24)	11	(United States) Colorado Gray Wolves
Rachel Johnson (c)	Flanker	5 February 1991 (aged 33)	26	(England) Exeter Chiefs
Georgie Perris-Redding	Flanker	1 October 1997 (aged 26)	11	(England) Sale Sharks
Freda Tafuna	Flanker	31 August 2003 (aged 20)	6	(United States) Lindenwood University
Kate Zackary	Number 8	26 July 1989 (aged 34)	36	(England) Ealing Trailfinders
Tahlia Brody	Back row	10 September 1994 (aged 29)	8	(England) Leicester Tigers
Cassidy Bargell	Scrum-half	28 December 1999 (aged 24)	1	(United States) Beantown RFC
Olivia Ortiz	Scrum-half	23 October 1997 (aged 26)	17	(England) Exeter Chiefs
Taina Tukuafu	Scrum-half	18 August 2001 (aged 22)	6	(United States) Lindenwood University
Gabby Cantorna	Fly-half	2 August 1995 (aged 28)	25	(England) Exeter Chiefs
McKenzie Hawkins	Fly-half	8 January 1997 (aged 27)	13	(United States) Colorado Gray Wolves
Eti Haungatau	Centre	25 September 2000 (aged 23)	13	(England) Sale Sharks
Emily Henrich	Centre	10 November 1999 (aged 24)	13	Unattached
Atumata Hingano	Centre	2 August 1998 (aged 25)	2	(United States) USA Sevens
Katana Howard	Centre	25 June 1993 (aged 30)	18	(England) Sale Sharks
Amanda Berta	Wing	7 July 1995 (aged 28)	1	(United States) Experts PR7s
Lotte Clapp	Wing	13 January 1995 (aged 29)	14	(England) Saracens
Autumn Czaplicki	Wing	4 November 1999 (aged 24)	3	(United States) USA Sevens
Tess Feury	Fullback	15 March 1996 (aged 28)	23	(England) Leicester Tigers
Bulou Mataitoga	Fullback	8 April 1994 (aged 30)	14	(England) Loughborough Lightning
