= 2024 Laurie O'Reilly Cup =

Tournament details
- Date: 25 May & 14 July
- Countries: Australia; New Zealand
- Teams: 2

Final positions
- Champions: New Zealand (15th title)

Tournament statistics
- Matches played: 2
- Tries scored: 23 (11.5 per match)
- Top scorer(s): Katelyn Vaha'akolo (25 points)
- Most tries: Katelyn Vaha'akolo (5)

The 2024 Laurie O'Reilly Cup was the 15th edition of the women's rugby union competition and was held on 25 May and 14 July. The first test doubled as the final Pacific Four Series match and was hosted by New Zealand. The second and final test was held in Australia.

The Black Ferns retained the Laurie O'Reilly Cup in a clean sweep after beating the Wallaroos at Ballymore Stadium.

== Table ==
Pos.	Nation	Games				Points			Tries	
Pos.	Nation	Played	Won	Drawn	Lost	For	Against	Diff.	For	Against
1	New Zealand	2	2	0	0	129	19	+110	20	2
2	Australia	2	0	0	2	19	129	–110	2	20

== Fixtures ==
=== Test 1 ===
25 May 2024
14:05 NZST (UTC+12)

New Zealand	67–19	Australia
Try: Olsen-Baker 5' c Brunt 14' c Paul (3) 21' m, 24' c, 48' m Mikaele-Tu'u 31' c Ponsonby 33' c Vaha'akolo 35' c Viliko 44' m Simon (2) 55' c, 72' m Con: Holmes (6/11) 6', 14, 25', 32', 36', 56'	Report	Try: Stewart 52' m McKenzie (2) 8' c, 58' c Con: McKenzie (2/3) 9', 58'

North Harbour Stadium, Albany
Referee: Aimee Barrett-Theron (South Africa)

Team details

FB	15	Renee Holmes
RW	14	Mererangi Paul
OC	13	Amy du Plessis (substituted off) 50'
IC	12	Sylvia Brunt (substituted off) 56'
LW	11	Katelyn Vaha'akolo
FH	10	Hannah King
SH	9	Iritana Hohaia (substituted off) 56'
N8	8	Kaipo Olsen-Baker
OF	7	Kennedy Simon (cc)
BF	6	Liana Mikaele-Tu'u (substituted off) 56'
RL	5	Alana Bremner
LL	4	Maiakawanakaulani Roos (substituted off) 60'
TP	3	Amy Rule (substituted off) 46'
HK	2	Georgia Ponsonby (substituted off) 46'
LP	1	Chryss Viliko (substituted off) 46'
Replacements:
HK	16	Luka Connor (substituted on) 46'
PR	17	Marcelle Parkes (substituted on) 46'
PR	18	Aldora Itunu (substituted on) 46'
LK	19	Charmaine Smith (substituted on) 60'
LF	20	Layla Sae (substituted on) 56'
SH	21	Maia Joseph (substituted on) 56'
FH	22	Ruahei Demant (cc) (substituted on) 56'
CE	23	Grace Steinmetz (substituted on) 50'
Coach:
(New Zealand) Allan Bunting

FB	15	Caitlyn Halse (substituted off) 47'
RW	14	Maya Stewart
OC	13	Georgina Friedrichs
IC	12	Cecilia Smith (substituted off) 63'
LW	11	Desiree Miller
FH	10	Arabella McKenzie
SH	9	Samantha Wood (substituted off) 47'
N8	8	Piper Duck (substituted off) 76'
OF	7	Leilani Nathan
BF	6	Siokapesi Palu
RL	5	Atasi Lafai
LL	4	Michaela Leonard (c) (substituted off) 47'
TP	3	Asoiva Karpani (substituted off) 51'
HK	2	Tania Naden (substituted off) 76'
LP	1	Brianna Hoy (substituted off) 76'
Replacements:
HK	16	Hera-Barb Malcolm Heke (substituted on) 76'
PR	17	Sally Fuesaina (substituted on) 76'
PR	18	Bridie O'Gorman (substituted on) 51'
LK	19	Kaitlan Leaney (substituted on) 47'
FL	20	Tabua Tuinakauvadra (substituted on) 76'
SH	21	Layne Morgan (substituted on) 47'
CE	22	Trilleen Pomare (substituted on) 63'
FH	23	Faitala Moleka (substituted on) 47'
Coach:
(England) Joanne Yapp

Assistant referees:
Natarsha Ganley (New Zealand)
Tyler Miller (Australia)
Television match official:
Chris Assmus (Canada)

Notes:

- Alana Bremner played her 20th test for the Black Ferns and Marcelle Parkes returned to the side for the first time since 2019, this time as a Loosehead Prop.

=== Test 2 ===
14 July 2024
14:00 AEST (UTC+10)

Australia	0–62	New Zealand
	Report	Try: Ponsonby 3' c Sae 13' c Tui 18' m Vaha'akolo (4) 21' m, 35' m, 40' c, 62' m Brunt 51' c Lolohea 72' c Penalty Try 81'; Con: Holmes (5/9) 4', 14', 41', 52', 73'

Ballymore Stadium, Brisbane
Referee: Sara Cox (England)

Team details

FB	15	Lori Cramer
RW	14	Biola Dawa
OC	13	Georgina Friedrichs
IC	12	Cecilia Smith
LW	11	Desiree Miller
FH	10	Arabella McKenzie
SH	9	Layne Morgan
N8	8	Piper Duck
OF	7	Ashley Marsters
BF	6	Atasi Lafai
RL	5	Michaela Leonard (c)
LL	4	Kaitlan Leaney
TP	3	Asoiva Karpani
HK	2	Tania Naden
LP	1	Brianna Hoy
Replacements:
HK	16	Tiarna Molloy
PR	17	Allana Sikimeti
PR	18	Bridie O'Gorman
LK	19	Leilani Nathan
FL	20	Siokapesi Palu
SH	21	Natalie Wright
CE	22	Trilleen Pomare
WG	23	Faitala Moleka
Coach:
(England) Joanne Yapp

FB	15	Renee Holmes
RW	14	Ruby Tui
OC	13	Sylvia Brunt
IC	12	Ruahei Demant (c)
LW	11	Katelyn Vaha'akolo
FH	10	Hannah King
SH	9	Maia Joseph
N8	8	Kaipo Olsen-Baker
OF	7	Layla Sae
BF	6	Liana Mikaele-Tu'u
RL	5	Alana Bremner
LL	4	Maiakawanakaulani Roos
TP	3	Tanya Kalounivale
HK	2	Georgia Ponsonby
LP	1	Chryss Viliko
Replacements:
HK	16	Atlanta Lolohea
PR	17	Phillipa Love
PR	18	Amy Rule
LK	19	Chelsea Bremner
FL	20	Lucy Jenkins
SH	21	Iritana Hohaia
CE	22	Monica Tagoai
WG	23	Mererangi Paul
Coach:
(New Zealand) Allan Bunting

Assistant referees:
Natarsha Ganley (New Zealand)
Tyler Miller (Australia)
Television match official:
Chris Assmus (Canada)

Notes:

- Atlanta Lolohea made her Black Ferns debut.

== Squads ==
=== Australia ===
Jo Yapp announced the Wallaroos 30-member squad to the 2024 Pacific Four Series on 30 April.

Player	Position	Date of birth (age)	Caps	Club/province
Hera-Barb Malcolm Heke	Hooker	29 January 2000 (aged 24)	0	(Australia) Western Force
Ashley Marsters	Hooker	2 November 1993 (aged 30)	26	(Australia) Melbourne Rebels
Tania Naden	Hooker	20 February 1992 (aged 32)	10	(Australia) ACT Brumbies
Sally Fuesaina	Prop	15 February 1992 (aged 32)	0	(Australia) ACT Brumbies
Brianna Hoy	Prop	7 July 2000 (aged 23)	3	(Australia) NSW Waratahs
Asoiva Karpani	Prop	18 June 1996 (aged 27)	21	(Australia) NSW Waratahs
Bridie O'Gorman	Prop	8 December 1998 (aged 25)	17	(Australia) NSW Waratahs
Allana Sikimeti	Prop	2 July 2004 (aged 19)	0	(Australia) ACT Brumbies
Atasi Lafai	Lock	24 July 1994 (aged 29)	9	(Australia) NSW Waratahs
Kaitlan Leaney	Lock	10 October 2000 (aged 23)	15	(Australia) NSW Waratahs
Michaela Leonard (c)	Lock	6 March 1995 (aged 29)	22	(Australia) Western Force
Piper Duck	Flanker	2 April 2001 (aged 23)	10	(Australia) NSW Waratahs
Tiarah Minns	Flanker	6 April 2001 (aged 23)	0	(Australia) Melbourne Rebels
Leilani Nathan	Flanker	20 July 2000 (aged 23)	2	(Australia) NSW Waratahs
Siokapesi Palu	Flanker	15 October 1996 (aged 27)	6	(Australia) ACT Brumbies
Lydia Kavoa	Number 8	8 November 1993 (aged 30)	0	(Australia) ACT Brumbies
Tabua Tuinakauvadra	Back row	27 December 2002 (aged 21)	4	(Australia) ACT Brumbies
Layne Morgan	Scrum-half	20 April 1999 (aged 25)	19	(Australia) NSW Waratahs
Samantha Wood	Scrum-half	17 July 2004 (aged 19)	0	(Australia) Western Force
Arabella McKenzie	Fly-half	1 March 1999 (aged 25)	21	(Australia) NSW Waratahs
Faitala Moleka	Fly-half	29 January 2005 (aged 19)	6	(Australia) ACT Brumbies
Georgina Friedrichs	Centre	14 April 1995 (aged 29)	19	(Australia) NSW Waratahs
Trilleen Pomare	Centre	5 April 1993 (aged 31)	24	(Australia) Western Force
Shalom Sauaso	Centre	2008 (aged 16)	0	(Australia) Queensland Reds
Cecilia Smith	Centre	13 March 1994 (aged 30)	12	(Australia) Queensland Reds
Biola Dawa	Wing	5 November 2000 (aged 23)	0	(Australia) ACT Brumbies
Desiree Miller	Wing	13 January 2002 (aged 22)	2	(Australia) NSW Waratahs
Maya Stewart	Wing	14 March 2000 (aged 24)	8	(Australia) NSW Waratahs
Lori Cramer	Fullback	8 March 1993 (aged 31)	19	(Australia) Queensland Reds
Caitlyn Halse	Utility back	18 September 2006 (aged 17)	0	(Australia) NSW Waratahs

=== New Zealand ===
Allan Bunting named the Black Ferns 30-player squad for the 2024 Pacific Four Series on 1 May.

Player	Position	Date of birth (age)	Caps	Club/province
Luka Connor	Hooker	24 September 1996 (aged 27)	20	(New Zealand) Chiefs Manawa / Bay of Plenty
Georgia Ponsonby	Hooker	14 December 1999 (aged 24)	20	(New Zealand) Matatū / Canterbury
Atlanta Lolohea	Hooker	16 April 2003 (aged 21)	1	(New Zealand) Matatū / Canterbury
Leaso Grace Gago Tiatia	Hooker	5 May 1998 (aged 26)	1	(New Zealand) Blues / Counties Manukau
Kate Henwood	Prop	28 January 1989 (aged 35)	4	(New Zealand) Chiefs Manawa / Bay of Plenty
Aldora Itunu	Prop	28 June 1991 (aged 32)	24	(New Zealand) Blues / Auckland
Tanya Kalounivale	Prop	20 January 1999 (aged 25)	11	(New Zealand) Chiefs Manawa / Waikato
Marcelle Parkes	Prop	9 September 1997 (aged 26)	5	(New Zealand) Matatū / Canterbury
Amy Rule	Prop	15 July 2000 (aged 23)	19	(New Zealand) Matatū / Canterbury
Chryss Viliko	Prop	25 December 2000 (aged 23)	2	(New Zealand) Blues / Auckland
Alana Bremner	Lock	10 February 1997 (aged 27)	19	(New Zealand) Matatū / Canterbury
Maiakawanakaulani Roos	Lock	27 July 2001 (aged 22)	21	(New Zealand) Blues / Auckland
Charmaine Smith	Lock	15 November 1990 (aged 33)	29	(New Zealand) Chiefs Manawa / Northland
Ma'ama Vaipulu	Lock	26 November 2002 (aged 21)	0	(New Zealand) Blues / Auckland
Kaipo Olsen-Baker	Loose forward	1 May 2002 (aged 22)	2	(New Zealand) Matatū / Manawatū
Layla Sae	Loose forward	22 October 2000 (aged 23)	3	(New Zealand) Hurricanes Poua / Manawatū
Kennedy Simon (cc)	Loose forward	1 October 1996 (aged 27)	20	(New Zealand) Chiefs Manawa / Waikato
Liana Mikaele-Tu'u	Loose forward	2 March 2002 (aged 22)	18	(New Zealand) Blues / Auckland
Iritana Hohaia	Scrum-half	1 March 2000 (aged 24)	6	(New Zealand) Hurricanes Poua / Taranaki
Maia Joseph	Scrum-half	25 May 2002 (aged 22)	0	(New Zealand) Matatū / Otago
Ruahei Demant (cc)	Fly-half	21 April 1995 (aged 29)	33	(New Zealand) Blues / Auckland
Hannah King	Fly-half	13 January 2004 (aged 20)	0	(New Zealand) Hurricanes Poua / Canterbury
Sylvia Brunt	Centre	1 January 2004 (aged 20)	13	(New Zealand) Blues / Auckland
Amy du Plessis	Centre	7 July 1999 (aged 24)	14	(New Zealand) Matatū / Canterbury
Grace Steinmetz	Centre	16 January 1998 (aged 26)	2	(New Zealand) Chiefs Manawa / Canterbury
Monica Tagoai	Centre	17 October 1998 (aged 25)	3	(New Zealand) Hurricanes Poua / Wellington
Renee Holmes	Utility back	21 December 1999 (aged 24)	16	(New Zealand) Chiefs Manawa / Waikato
Patricia Maliepo	Utility back	13 March 2003 (aged 21)	7	(New Zealand) Blues / Auckland
Mererangi Paul	Utility back	29 October 1998 (aged 25)	5	(New Zealand) Chiefs Manawa / Counties Manukau
Ruby Tui	Utility back	13 December 1991 (aged 32)	13	(New Zealand) Chiefs Manawa / Counties Manukau
Katelyn Vaha'akolo	Utility back	18 April 2000 (aged 24)	6	(New Zealand) Blues / Auckland

== See also ==
- 2024 Pacific Four Series
