= 2025 Laurie O'Reilly Cup =

Tournament details
- Date: 10 May & 12 July
- Countries: Australia; New Zealand
- Teams: 2

Final positions
- Champions: New Zealand (16th title)

Tournament statistics
- Matches played: 2
- Tries scored: 17 (8.5 per match)
- Top scorer(s): Portia Woodman-Wickliffe (15 points)
- Most tries: Portia Woodman-Wickliffe (3)

The 2025 Laurie O'Reilly Cup was the 16th edition of the women's rugby union competition and was held on 10th May and 12th July. The first test was played during the Pacific Four Series and was hosted by Australia at the McDonald Jones Stadium, it was the first match in the region since 2019. The final O’Reilly Cup clash was held in New Zealand in Wellington.

The Black Ferns won the competition and maintained their unbeaten run after 29 tests against the Wallaroos.

== Table ==
Pos.	Nation	Games			Points			Tries	
Pos.	Nation	Won	Drawn	Lost	For	Against	Diff.	For	Against
1	New Zealand	2	0	0	75	24	+51	13	4
2	Australia	0	0	2	24	75	–51	4	13

== Fixtures ==
=== Test 1 ===
10 May 2025
17:00 AEST (UTC+10)

Australia	12–38	New Zealand
Try: Asoiva Karpani 45'm Ashley Marsters 56'c Con: Faitala Moleka (1/2) 57'		Try: Ayesha Leti-I'iga (2) 11'c, 25'c Braxton Sorensen-McGee (2) 38'm, 78'c Chryss Viliko 41'c Sylvia Brunt 66'm Con: Ruahei Demant (3/4) 12', 26', 42'; Hannah King (1/2) 79'

McDonald Jones Stadium, Newcastle
Referee: Clara Munarini

Team details

LP	1	Martha Fua
HK	2	Katalina Amosa
TP	3	Eva Karpani
LL	4	Kaitlan Leaney
RL	5	Michaela Leonard
BF	6	Siokapesi Palu (c)
OF	7	Emily Chancellor
N8	8	Tabua Tuinakauvadra
SH	9	Layne Morgan
FH	10	Tia Hinds
LW	11	Desiree Miller
IC	12	Cecilia Smith
OC	13	Georgina Friedrichs
RW	14	Charlotte Caslick
FB	15	Faitala Moleka
Replacements:
HK	16	Tania Naden
PR	17	Lydia Kavoa
PR	18	Bridie O’Gorman
LK	19	Tiarah Minns
FW	20	Ashley Marsters
SH	21	Natalie Wright
BK	22	Trilleen Pomare
BK	23	Lori Cramer
Coach:
(England) Joanne Yapp

LP	1	Chryss Viliko
HK	2	Georgia Ponsonby
TP	3	Tanya Kalounivale
LL	4	Alana Bremner
RL	5	Maiakawanakaulani Roos
BF	6	Layla Sae
OF	7	Kennedy Tukuafu (cc)
N8	8	Kaipo Olsen-Baker
SH	9	Maia Joseph
FH	10	Ruahei Demant (cc)
LW	11	Katelyn Vaha'akolo
IC	12	Sylvia Brunt
OC	13	Amy du Plessis
RW	14	Ayesha Leti-I’iga
FB	15	Braxton Sorensen-McGee
Replacements:
HK	16	Atlanta Lolohea
PR	17	Awhina Tangen-Wainohu
PR	18	Amy Rule
FW	19	Maama Mo’onia Vaipulu
FW	20	Dhys Faleafaga
FW	21	Iritana Hohaia
BK	22	Hannah King
BK	23	Mererangi Paul
Coach:
(New Zealand) Allan Bunting

- Braxton Sorensen-McGee made her test debut for the Black Ferns.

=== Test 2 ===
12 July 2025
16:30 NZST (UTC+12)

New Zealand	37–12	Australia
Try: Portia Woodman-Wickliffe (3) 1'm, 33'm, 56'm Ruahei Demant 46'm Jorja Miller 50'c Sylvia Brunt 62'm Ruby Tui 66'm Con: Renee Holmes (1/5) 51'		Try: Charlotte Caslick 4'c Lydia Kavoa 78'm Con: Faitala Moleka (1/1) 5'

Sky Stadium, Wellington
Referee: Kat Roche

Team details

LP	1	Chryss Viliko
HK	2	Georgia Ponsonby
TP	3	Tanya Kalounivale
LL	4	Maiakawanakaulani Roos
RL	5	Chelsea Bremner
BF	6	Alana Bremner (cc)
OF	7	Jorja Miller
N8	8	Liana Mikaele-Tu'u
SH	9	Risaleaana Pouri-Lane
FH	10	Ruahei Demant (cc)
LW	11	Katelyn Vaha'akolo
IC	12	Sylvia Brunt
OC	13	Stacey Waaka
RW	14	Portia Woodman-Wickliffe
FB	15	Renee Holmes
Replacements:
HK	16	Vici-Rose Green
PR	17	Awhina Tangen-Wainohu
PR	18	Amy Rule
LK	19	Laura Bayfield
FW	20	Layla Sae
SH	21	Iritana Hohaia
BK	22	Kelly Brazier
BK	23	Ruby Tui
Coach:
(New Zealand) Allan Bunting

LP	1	Faliki Pohiva
HK	2	Tania Naden
TP	3	Bridie O’Gorman
LL	4	Kaitlan Leaney
RL	5	Michaela Leonard
BF	6	Siokapesi Palu (c)
OF	7	Ashley Marsters
N8	8	Tabua Tuinakauvadra
SH	9	Layne Morgan
FH	10	Tia Hinds
LW	11	Desiree Miller
IC	12	Trilleen Pomare
OC	13	Charlotte Caslick
RW	14	Waiaria Ellis
FB	15	Faitala Moleka
Replacements:
HK	16	Adiana Talakai
PR	17	Lydia Kavoa
PR	18	Eva Karpani
FW	19	Annabelle Codey
FW	20	Piper Duck
FW	21	Emily Chancellor
BK	22	Samantha Wood
BK	23	Cecilia Smith
Coach:
(England) Joanne Yapp

- Waiaria Ellis of the Wallaroos and Laura Bayfield of the Black Ferns made their international debuts for their respective teams.

== See also ==
- 2025 Pacific Four Series
