= 2026 Laurie O'Reilly Cup =

Rugby tournament

Tournament details
- Date: 25 April – 22 August
- Countries: Australia; New Zealand
- Teams: 2

Final positions
- Champions: New Zealand (17th title)

Tournament statistics
- Matches played: 2
- Tries scored: 20 (10 per match)
- Top scorer(s): Braxton Sorensen-McGee (16 points)
- Most tries: Ayesha Leti-I'iga (3 tries)

The 2026 Laurie O'Reilly Cup is the 17th edition of the women's rugby union competition, which is held on 25 April and 22 August 2026.

== Table ==
Pos.	Nation	Games			Points			Tries	
Pos.	Nation	Won	Drawn	Lost	For	Against	Diff.	For	Against
1	New Zealand	2	0	0	106	24	+82	16	4
2	Australia	0	0	2	24	106	–82	4	16

== Fixtures ==
=== Test 1 ===
25 April 2026
19:45 AEST (UTC+10)

Australia	5–40	New Zealand
Try: Palu 22' m Con: Wood (0/1)	Report	Try: Du Plessis 3' c Leti-I'iga (2) 25' c, 35' c Mahutariki-Fakalelu 41' c McGregor 54' m Bayfield 61' c Con: Holmes (5/6) 4', 25', 36', 42', 61'

Sunshine Coast Stadium, Kawana Waters
Attendance: 5,508
Referee: Aurélie Groizeleau (France)

Team details

FB	15	Waiaria Ellis	(substituted off) 55'
RW	14	Maya Stewart	(substituted off) 67'
OC	13	Georgina Friedrichs
IC	12	Sidney Taylor
LW	11	Desiree Miller
FH	10	Faitala Moleka	(substituted off) 76'
SH	9	Samantha Wood	(substituted off) 61'	(substituted on) 76'
N8	8	Siokapesi Palu (c)
OF	7	Lily Bone	(substituted off) 49'
BF	6	Kaitlan Leaney
RL	5	Tiarah Minns
LL	4	Michaela Leonard	(substituted off) 61'
TP	3	Eva Karpani	(substituted off) 49'
HK	2	Tania Naden	(substituted off) 61'
LP	1	Brianna Hoy	(substituted off) 61'
Replacements:
HK	16	Brittany Merlo	(substituted on) 61'
PR	17	Martha Fua	(substituted on) 61'
PR	18	Bridie O'Gorman	(substituted on) 49'
LK	19	Ashley Fernandez	(substituted on) 61'
FL	20	Piper Duck	(substituted on) 49'
BR	21	Piper Simons	(substituted on) 61'
WG	22	Ava Wereta	(substituted on) 67'
CE	23	Nicole Ledington	(substituted on) 55'
Coach:
(Australia) Sam Needs

FB	15	Renee Holmes	(substituted off) 66'
RW	14	Justine McGregor
OC	13	Amy du Plessis
IC	12	Sylvia Brunt	(substituted off) 49'
LW	11	Ayesha Leti-I'iga
FH	10	Ruahei Demant (cc)
SH	9	Maia Joseph	(substituted off) 49'
N8	8	Kaipo Olsen-Baker
OF	7	Kennedy Tukuafu (cc)
BF	6	Liana Mikaele-Tu'u	(substituted off) 66'
RL	5	Laura Bayfield
LL	4	Maia Roos	(substituted off) 49'
TP	3	Mo'omo'oga Palu	(substituted off) 37'
HK	2	Georgia Ponsonby	(substituted off) 49'
LP	1	Chryss Viliko	(substituted off) 61'
Replacements:
LK	16	Atlanta Lolohea	(substituted on) 49'
PR	17	Maddison Robinson	(substituted on) 61'
PR	18	Veisinia Mahutariki-Fakalelu	(substituted on) 37'
LK	19	Maama Mo'onia Vaipulu	(substituted on) 49'
FL	20	Mia Anderson	(substituted on) 66'
SH	21	Tara Turner	(substituted on) 49'
FH	22	Hannah King	(substituted on) 49'
WG	23	Mererangi Paul	(substituted on) 66'
Coach:
(New Zealand) Whitney Hansen

Assistant referees:
Emma Gallagher (Canada)
Kristine Lovatt (Canada)
Television match official:
Cam Russell (Canada)
Foul play review officer:
Derek Summers (United States)

=== Test 2 ===
22 August 2026
15:05 NZST (UTC+12)

New Zealand	66–19	Australia
Try: Sorensen-McGee 4' c Viliko 14' c Demant 24' c Mikaele-Tu'u 35' m Roos 43' c Leti-I'iga 50' c Green 56' c Joseph 61' c Tuliau-Tua'a 64' m Sititi 76' c Con: Sorensen-McGee (8/10) 4', 14', 24', 44', 51', 57', 62', 77'	Report	Try: Miller 40+2' c Ellis 67' c Merlo 73' m Con: Miller (2/3) 40+3', 68'

Mount Smart Stadium, Auckland
Referee: Maggie Cogger-Orr (New Zealand)

Team details

FB	15	Braxton Sorensen-McGee
RW	14	Mererangi Paul
OC	13	Amy du Plessis
IC	12	Sylvia Brunt
LW	11	Ayesha Leti-I'iga
FH	10	Ruahei Demant (c)
SH	9	Maia Joseph
N8	8	Kaipo Olsen-Baker
OF	7	Elinor-Plum King
BF	6	Liana Mikaele-Tu'u
RL	5	Ma'ama Mo'onia Vaipulu	(yellow card) 32'
LL	4	Maia Roos
TP	3	Veisinia Mahutariki-Fakalelu
HK	2	Georgia Ponsonby
LP	1	Chryss Viliko
Replacements:
HK	16	Vici-Rose Green
PR	17	Maddison Robinson
PR	18	Santo Taumata
LK	19	Amarante Sititi
LK	20	Mia Anderson
BR	21	Ariana Bayler
SH	22	Hannah King
WG	23	Shyrah Tuliau-Tua'a
Coach:
(New Zealand) Whitney Hansen

FB	15	Faitala Moleka
RW	14	Maya Stewart
OC	13	Alysia Lefau-Fakaosilea
IC	12	Cecilia Smith
LW	11	Desiree Miller
FH	10	Waiaria Ellis
SH	9	Tia Hinds
N8	8	Piper Duck
OF	7	Lily Bone
BF	6	Siokapesi Palu (c)
RL	5	Michaela Leonard
LL	4	Kaitlan Leaney
TP	3	Eva Karpani
HK	2	Tania Naden
LP	1	Brianna Hoy
Replacements:
HK	16	Brittany Merlo
PR	17	Allana Sikimeti
PR	18	Bridie O'Gorman
LK	19	Pia Tapsell
LK	20	Emily Chancellor
BR	21	Samantha Wood
SH	22	Bienne Terita
WG	23	Maddison Levi
Coach:
(Australia) Sam Needs

Assistant referees:
Jess Ling (Australia)
Chloe Sampson (New Zealand)
Television match official:
Rachel Horton (Australia)

Notes:

- Elinor-Plum King, Amarante Sititi and Shyrah Tuliau-Tua'a (all New Zealand) and Maddison Levi (Australia) made their international debut.

== See also ==
- 2026 Pacific Four Series
