= 2024 Pacific Four Series =

2024 rugby union competition

Tournament details
- Hosts: Australia; New Zealand; United States
- Date: 28 April — 25 May 2024
- Countries: Australia; Canada; New Zealand; United States

Final positions
- Champions: Canada (2nd title)
- Runner-up: New Zealand

Tournament statistics
- Matches played: 6
- Tries scored: 55 (9.17 per match)
- Top scorer(s): (Canada) Sophie de Goede (33)
- Most tries: (New Zealand) Mererangi Paul (6)

The 2024 Pacific Four Series was the fourth edition of the Pacific Four Series, an international women's rugby union tournament that serves as one of the principal qualification routes for the top two tiers of the 2024 WXV and the 2025 Women's Rugby World Cup.

Canada won their second series title and defeated New Zealand for the first time in 18 encounters.

== Participants ==
Nation	Stadiums			Head coach	Captain
Nation	Home stadium	Capacity	Location	Head coach	Captain
Australia	Allianz Stadium	42,500	Sydney	(England) Joanne Yapp	Michaela Leonard
Australia	AAMI Park	29,500	Melbourne	(England) Joanne Yapp	Michaela Leonard
Canada	—N/a			(France) Kévin Rouet	Sophie de Goede
New Zealand	FMG Stadium Waikato	25,800	Hamilton	(New Zealand) Allan Bunting	Kennedy Simon; Ruahei Demant
New Zealand	Apollo Projects Stadium	17,104	Christchurch	(New Zealand) Allan Bunting	Kennedy Simon; Ruahei Demant
New Zealand	North Harbour Stadium	22,000	Albany	(New Zealand) Allan Bunting	Kennedy Simon; Ruahei Demant
United States	Dignity Health Sports Park	27,000	Carson, California	(Australia) Sione Fukofuka	Rachel Johnson

== Table ==
Pos	Team	Pld	W	D	L	PF	PA	PD	TF	TA	TB	LB	Pts	CAN	NZL	USA	AUS
1	Canada	3	3	0	0	105	40	+65	16	6	2	0	14	—			
2	New Zealand	3	2	0	1	143	46	+97	23	7	2	1	11	19–22	—	57–5	67–19
3	United States	3	1	0	2	44	132	−88	7	22	1	0	5	7–50		—	
4	Australia	3	0	0	3	58	132	−74	9	21	1	1	2	14–33		25–32	—

Source: World Rugby.
Legend: Blue = home team win; Yellow = draw; Red = away team win.

== Fixtures ==
The fixtures were announced on 30 January 2024.

28 April 2024
13:30 PDT (UTC−7)

United States	7–50	Canada (1 BP)
Try: Perris-Redding 18' c Con: Cantorna (1/1) 19'	Report	Try: Gallagher (2) 3' m, 70' m Beukeboom 9' m Royer 21' c Grant 43' c de Goede (2) 50' c, 55' c Omokhuale 79' c Con: de Goede (4/6) 21', 44', 50', 56'; Tessier (1/1) 80'

Dignity Health Sports Park, Carson
Referee: Tyler Miller (Australia)

Team details

FB	15	Tess Feury
RW	14	Emily Henreich
OC	13	Bulou Mataitoga	(yellow card) 70'
IC	12	Gabby Cantorna		(substituted off) 58'
LW	11	Autumn Czaplicki		(substituted off) 55'
FH	10	McKenzie Hawkins
SH	9	Olivia Ortiz		(substituted off) 58'
N8	8	Rachel Johnson (c)
OF	7	Georgie Perris-Redding
BF	6	Tahlia Brody		(substituted off) 61'
RL	5	Hallie Taufo'ou
LL	4	Erica Jarrell		(substituted off) 55'
TP	3	Keia Mae Sagapolu		(substituted off) 61'
HK	2	Kathryn Treder		(substituted off) 70'
LP	1	Hope Rogers		(substituted off) 66'
Replacements:
HK	16	Paige Stathopoulos		(substituted on) 70'
PR	17	Catherine Benson		(substituted on) 66'
PR	18	Charli Jacoby		(substituted on) 61'
LK	19	Jenny Kronish		(substituted on) 55'
FL	20	Rachel Ehrecke		(substituted on) 61'
SH	21	Cassidy Bargell		(substituted on) 58'
CE	22	Katana Howard		(substituted on) 58'
WG	23	Atumata Hingano		(substituted on) 55'
Coach:
Sione Fukofuka

FB	15	Sabrina Poulin		(substituted off) 64'
RW	14	Maddy Grant
OC	13	Shoshanah Seumanutafa		(substituted off) 59'
IC	12	Alex Tessier
LW	11	Paige Farries
FH	10	Claire Gallagher	(yellow card) 76'
SH	9	Olivia Apps		(substituted off) 70'
N8	8	Gabby Senft
OF	7	Sophie de Goede (c)		(substituted off) 64'
BF	6	Pamphinette Buisa
RL	5	Laetitia Royer		(substituted off) 52'
LL	4	Tyson Beukeboom
TP	3	DaLeaka Menin		(substituted off) 59'
HK	2	Sara Cline		(substituted off) 52'
LP	1	Olivia DeMerchant		(substituted off) 52'
Replacements:
HK	16	Emily Tuttosi		(substituted on) 52'
PR	17	McKinley Hunt		(substituted on) 52'
PR	18	Alex Ellis		(substituted on) 59'
LK	19	Courtney Holtkamp		(substituted on) 52'
FL	20	Julia Omokhuale		(substituted on) 64'
SH	21	Mahalia Robinson		(substituted on) 70'
FH	22	Julia Schell		(substituted on) 64'
WG	23	Fancy Bermudez		(substituted on) 59'
Coach:
Kévin Rouet

Assistant referees:
Amelia Luciano (United States)
Shanda Assmus (Canada)
Television match official:
Quinton Immelman (South Africa)

Notes:

- Justine Pelletier was originally named as Canadian scrum-half, but withdrew before kick-off due to injury. She was replaced by Olivia Apps, whose place on the bench was taken by Mahalia Robinson.

11 May 2024
14:05 NZST (UTC+12)

New Zealand	57–5	United States
Try: du Plessis 2' c Paul (3) 5' m, 10' m, 16' m Vaha'akolo 8' c Vaipulu 26' c Tui 54' c Sae 73' c Maliepo 75' c Con: Demant (3/6) 3', 9', 27'; King (3/3) 56', 74', 77'	Report	Try: Taufo'ou 63' m

FMG Stadium Waikato, Hamilton
Attendance: 4,000
Referee: Julianne Zussman (Canada)

Team details

FB	15	Mererangi Paul
RW	14	Ruby Tui
OC	13	Amy du Plessis
IC	12	Sylvia Brunt
LW	11	Katelyn Vaha'akolo
FH	10	Ruahei Demant (cc)
SH	9	Maia Joseph
N8	8	Layla Sae
OF	7	Kennedy Simon (cc)
BF	6	Liana Mikaele-Tu'u
RL	5	Ma'ama Mo'onia Vaipulu
LL	4	Maia Roos
TP	3	Tanya Kalounivale
HK	2	Georgia Ponsonby
LP	1	Kate Henwood
Replacements:
HK	16	Luka Connor
PR	17	Chryss Viliko
PR	18	Amy Rule
LK	19	Charmaine Smith
FL	20	Kaipo Olsen-Baker
SH	21	Iritana Hohaia
CE	22	Hannah King
FB	23	Patricia Maliepo
Coach:
Allan Bunting

FB	15	Tess Feury
RW	14	Emily Henrich
OC	13	Bulou Mataitoga
IC	12	Eti Haungatau	(substituted off) 30'
LW	11	Lotte Clapp	(substituted off) 58'
FH	10	Gabby Cantorna
SH	9	Olivia Ortiz	(substituted off) 55'
N8	8	Rachel Johnson (c)
OF	7	Georgie Perris-Redding
BF	6	Freda Tafuna	(substituted off) 64'
RL	5	Erica Jarrell	(substituted off) 74'
LL	4	Hallie Taufo'ou
TP	3	Charli Jacoby	(substituted off) 72'
HK	2	Kathryn Treder	(substituted off) 72'
LP	1	Hope Rogers	(substituted off) 72'
Replacements:
HK	16	Paige Stathopoulos	(substituted on) 72'
PR	17	Alivia Leatherman	(substituted on) 72'
PR	18	Catherine Benson	(substituted on) 72'
LK	19	Jenny Kronish	(substituted on) 74'
FL	20	Tahlia Brody	(substituted on) 64'
SH	21	Taina Tukuafu	(substituted on) 55'
FH	22	Atumata Hingano	(substituted on) 30'
FB	23	Autumn Czaplicki	(substituted on) 58'
Coach:
Sione Fukofuka

Assistant referees:
Tyler Miller (Australia)
Ella Goldsmith (Australia)
Television match official:
Rachel Horton (Australia)

Notes:

- Ma'ama Mo'onia Vaipulu, Maia Joseph and Hannah King (all New Zealand) made their international debuts.

11 May 2024
16:55 AEST (UTC+10)

Australia	14–33	Canada
Try: Naden 21' c Penalty try 48'; Con: McKenzie (1/1) 22'	Report	Try: Cline (2) 5' c, 31' c Hunt (2) 10' m, 45' c Menin 51' c Con: de Goede (4/5) 6', 32', 46', 52'

Allianz Stadium, Sydney
Referee: Natarsha Ganley (New Zealand)

Team details

FB	15	Lori Cramer	(substituted off) 67'
RW	14	Maya Stewart
OC	13	Georgina Friedrichs
IC	12	Trilleen Pomare
LW	11	Desiree Miller
FH	10	Arabella McKenzie
SH	9	Layne Morgan	(substituted off) 67'
N8	8	Piper Duck	(substituted off) 75'
OF	7	Ashley Marsters
BF	6	Siokapesi Palu	(substituted off) 58'
RL	5	Michaela Leonard (c)	(substituted off) 47'
LL	4	Kaitlan Leaney
TP	3	Bridie O'Gorman	(substituted off) 47'
HK	2	Tania Naden	(substituted off) 72'
LP	1	Brianna Hoy	(substituted off) 72'
Replacements:
HK	16	Hera-Barb Malcolm Heke	(substituted on) 72'
PR	17	Sally Fuesaina	(substituted on) 72'
PR	18	Asoiva Karpani	(substituted on) 47'
LK	19	Atasi Lafai	(substituted on) 47'
LF	20	Leilani Nathan	(substituted on) 58'
LF	21	Tabua Tuinakauvadra	(substituted on) 75'
SH	22	Samantha Wood	(substituted on) 67'
UB	23	Faitala Moleka	(substituted on) 67'
Coach:
Joanne Yapp

FB	15	Sarah-Maude Lachance		(substituted off) 60'
RW	14	Maddy Grant	(yellow card) 48'	(substituted off) 65'
OC	13	Fancy Bermudez
IC	12	Alex Tessier
LW	11	Paige Farries		(substituted off) 74'
FH	10	Claire Gallagher
SH	9	Olivia Apps
N8	8	Gabby Senft		(substituted off) 63'
OF	7	Sophie de Goede (c)
BF	6	Pamphinette Buisa
RL	5	Laetitia Royer		(substituted off) 52'
LL	4	Tyson Beukeboom
TP	3	DaLeaka Menin		(substituted off) 72'
HK	2	Sara Cline		(substituted off) 41'
LP	1	McKinley Hunt		(substituted off) 52'
Replacements:
HK	16	Emily Tuttosi		(substituted on) 41'
PR	17	Brittany Kassil		(substituted on) 52'
PR	18	Alex Ellis		(substituted on) 72'
LK	19	Courtney Holtkamp		(substituted on) 52'
FL	20	Fabiola Forteza		(substituted on) 63'
SH	21	Justine Pelletier		(substituted on) 65'
FH	22	Julia Schell
WG	23	Shoshanah Seumanutafa		(substituted on) 74'
Coach:
Kévin Rouet

Assistant referees:
Tiana Anderson (New Zealand)
Chloe Sampson (New Zealand)
Television match official:
Glenn Newman (New Zealand)

Notes:

- Hera-Barb Malcolm Heke, Sally Fuesaina and Samantha Wood (all Australia) made their international debuts.
- Alex Tessier (Canada) earned her 50th cap and Tyson Beukeboom tied Gillian Florence as Canada's all-time women's capped player with 67.

17 May 2024
16:55 AEST (UTC+10)

Australia	25–32	United States
Try: Miller 5' m Marsters 18' c Stewart 33' m Friedrichs 56' m Con: McKenzie (1/4) 19'; Pen: McKenzie (1/1) 40'+3	Report	Try: Treder 37' m Rogers (2) 44' c, 47' m Clapp 62' c Hingano 70' m Con: Cantorna (2/4) 45', 64'; Pen: Cantorna (1/2) 9'

AAMI Park, Melbourne
Referee: Maggie Cogger-Orr (New Zealand)

Team details

FB	15	Caitlyn Halse
RW	14	Maya Stewart
OC	13	Georgina Friedrichs
IC	12	Trilleen Pomare
LW	11	Desiree Miller
FH	10	Arabella McKenzie	(substituted off) 68'
SH	9	Samantha Wood	(substituted off) 51'
N8	8	Piper Duck
OF	7	Ashley Marsters
BF	6	Siokapesi Palu	(substituted off) 57'
RL	5	Michaela Leonard (c)
LL	4	Kaitlan Leaney	(substituted off) 46'
TP	3	Asoiva Karpani	(substituted off) 51'
HK	2	Tania Naden	(substituted off) 78'
LP	1	Brianna Hoy	(substituted off) 78'
Replacements:
HK	16	Hera-Barb Malcolm Heke	(substituted on) 78'
PR	17	Sally Fuesaina	(substituted on) 78'
PR	18	Bridie O'Gorman	(substituted on) 51'
LK	19	Atasi Lafai	(substituted on) 47'
FL	20	Leilani Nathan	(substituted on) 57'
SH	21	Layne Morgan	(substituted on) 51'
CE	22	Faitala Moleka	(substituted on) 68'
WG	23	Lori Cramer	(substituted on) 68'
Coach:
Joanne Yapp

FB	15	Tess Feury
RW	14	Bulou Mataitoga
OC	13	Atumata Hingano	(substituted off) 78'
IC	12	Gabby Cantorna	(substituted off) 65'
LW	11	Lotte Clapp
FH	10	McKenzie Hawkins
SH	9	Olivia Ortiz	(substituted off) 55'
N8	8	Rachel Johnson
OF	7	Georgie Perris-Redding
BF	6	Kate Zackary (c)	(substituted off) 55'
RL	5	Erica Jarrell	(substituted off) 52'
LL	4	Hallie Taufo'ou
TP	3	Charli Jacoby	(substituted off) 40'
HK	2	Kathryn Treder	(substituted off) 78'
LP	1	Hope Rogers	(substituted off) 78'
Replacements:
HK	16	Paige Stathopoulos	(substituted on) 78'
PR	17	Alivia Leatherman	(substituted on) 78'
PR	18	Keia Mae Sagapiolu	(substituted on) 41'
LK	19	Rachel Ehrecke	(substituted on) 53'
FL	20	Freda Tafuna	(substituted on) 56'
SH	21	Taina Tukuafu	(substituted on) 56'
CE	22	Katana Howard	(substituted on) 66'
WG	23	Emily Henrich	(substituted on) 78'
Coach:
Sione Fukofuka

Assistant referees:
Tiana Anderson (New Zealand)
Chloe Sampson (New Zealand)
Television match official:
Glenn Newman (New Zealand)

Notes:

- Caitlyn Halse (Australia) became the youngest-ever Australian to play test rugby, male or female, at 17 years and 242 days.

19 May 2024
16:35 NZST (UTC+12)

New Zealand	19–22	Canada
Try: Vaha'akolo (2) 10' c, 22' c Maliepo 73' m Con: Demant (2/3) 11', 24'	Report	Try: Bermudez (2) 29' c, 60' c Hunt 44' m Con: de Goede (2/3) 30', 60'; Pen: de Goede (1/1) 7'

Apollo Projects Stadium, Christchurch
Attendance: 6,000
Referee: Aurélie Groizeleau (France)

Team details

FB	15	Mererangi Paul
RW	14	Ruby Tui
OC	13	Amy du Plessis
IC	12	Sylvia Brunt	(yellow card) 58'
LW	11	Katelyn Vaha'akolo		(substituted off) 54'
FH	10	Ruahei Demant (cc)
SH	9	Maia Joseph		(substituted off) 67'
N8	8	Liana Mikaele-Tu'u
OF	7	Kennedy Simon (cc)
BF	6	Layla Sae		(substituted off) 49'
RL	5	Ma'ama Mo'onia Vaipulu		(substituted off) 53'
LL	4	Maia Roos
TP	3	Tanya Kalounivale		(substituted off) 53'
HK	2	Georgia Ponsonby		(substituted off) 61'
LP	1	Chryss Viliko		(substituted off) 61'
Replacements:
HK	16	Luka Connor		(substituted on) 61'
PR	17	Amy Rule		(substituted on) 53'
PR	18	Aldora Itunu	(yellow card) 79'	(substituted on) 61'
LK	19	Charmaine Smith		(substituted on) 53'
FL	20	Kaipo Olsen-Baker		(substituted on) 49'
SH	21	Iritana Hohaia		(substituted on) 67'
FH	22	Hannah King
WG	23	Patricia Maliepo		(substituted on) 54'
Coach:
Allan Bunting

FB	15	Julia Schell
RW	14	Fancy Bermudez
OC	13	Shoshanah Seumanutafa
IC	12	Alex Tessier
LW	11	Paige Farries
FH	10	Claire Gallagher
SH	9	Olivia Apps	(yellow card) 72'
N8	8	Gabrielle Senft
OF	7	Sophie de Goede (c)
BF	6	Pamphinette Buisa
RL	5	Laetitia Royer
LL	4	Tyson Beukeboom
TP	3	DaLeaka Menin
HK	2	Sara Cline
LP	1	McKinley Hunt
Replacements:
HK	16	Emily Tuttosi
PR	17	Brittany Kassil
PR	18	Alex Ellis
LK	19	Courtney Holtkamp
BR	20	Julia Omokhuale
BR	21	Fabiola Forteza
SH	22	Justine Pelletier
WG	23	Maddy Grant
Coach:
Kévin Rouet

Assistant referees:
Ella Goldsmith (Australia)
Jess Ling (Australia)
Television match official:
Rachel Horton (Australia)

Notes:

- Canada beat New Zealand for the first time.
- New Zealand dropped out of the top two in the World Rugby Women's World Rankings for the first time.
- Tyson Beukeboom became Canada's all-time women's most capped player, with 68 caps.

25 May 2024
14:05 NZST (UTC+12)

New Zealand	67–19	Australia
Try: Olsen-Baker 5' c Brunt 14' c Paul (3) 21' m, 24' c, 48' m Mikaele-Tu'u 31' c Ponsonby 33' m Vaha'akolo 35' c Viliko 44' m Simon (2) 55' c, 72' m Con: Holmes (6/11) 6', 14, 25', 32', 36', 56'	Report	Try: Stewart 52' m McKenzie (2) 8' c, 58' c Con: McKenzie (2/3) 9', 58'

North Harbour Stadium, Albany
Attendance: 7,300
Referee: Aimee Barrett-Theron (South Africa)

Team details

FB	15	Renee Holmes
RW	14	Mererangi Paul
OC	13	Amy du Plessis	(substituted off) 50'
IC	12	Sylvia Brunt	(substituted off) 56'
LW	11	Katelyn Vaha'akolo
FH	10	Hannah King
SH	9	Iritana Hohaia	(substituted off) 56'
N8	8	Kaipo Olsen-Baker
OF	7	Kennedy Simon (cc)
BF	6	Liana Mikaele-Tu'u	(substituted off) 56'
RL	5	Alana Bremner
LL	4	Maia Roos	(substituted off) 60'
TP	3	Amy Rule	(substituted off) 46'
HK	2	Georgia Ponsonby	(substituted off) 46'
LP	1	Chryss Viliko	(substituted off) 46'
Replacements:
HK	16	Luka Connor	(substituted on) 46'
PR	17	Marcelle Parkes	(substituted on) 46'
PR	18	Aldora Itunu	(substituted on) 46'
LK	19	Charmaine Smith	(substituted on) 60'
LF	20	Layla Sae	(substituted on) 56'
SH	21	Maia Joseph	(substituted on) 56'
FH	22	Ruahei Demant (cc)	(substituted on) 56'
CE	23	Grace Steinmetz	(substituted on) 50'
Coach:
Allan Bunting

FB	15	Caitlyn Halse	(substituted off) 47'
RW	14	Maya Stewart
OC	13	Georgina Friedrichs
IC	12	Cecilia Smith	(substituted off) 63'
LW	11	Desiree Miller
FH	10	Arabella McKenzie
SH	9	Samantha Wood	(substituted off) 47'
N8	8	Piper Duck	(substituted off) 76'
OF	7	Leilani Nathan
BF	6	Siokapesi Palu
RL	5	Atasi Lafai
LL	4	Michaela Leonard (c)	(substituted off) 47'
TP	3	Asoiva Karpani	(substituted off) 51'
HK	2	Tania Naden	(substituted off) 76'
LP	1	Brianna Hoy	(substituted off) 76'
Replacements:
HK	16	Hera-Barb Malcolm Heke	(substituted on) 76'
PR	17	Sally Fuesaina	(substituted on) 76'
PR	18	Bridie O'Gorman	(substituted on) 51'
LK	19	Kaitlan Leaney	(substituted on) 47'
FL	20	Tabua Tuinakauvadra	(substituted on) 76'
SH	21	Layne Morgan	(substituted on) 47'
CE	22	Trilleen Pomare	(substituted on) 63'
FH	23	Faitala Moleka	(substituted on) 47'
Coach:
Joanne Yapp

Assistant referees:
Natarsha Ganley (New Zealand)
Tyler Miller (Australia)
Television match official:
Chris Assmus (Canada)

== Player statistics ==
=== Most points ===
Rank	Name	Team	Points
1	Sophie de Goede	Canada	33
2	Mererangi Paul	New Zealand	30
3	Arabella McKenzie	Australia	21
4	Katelyn Vaha'akolo	New Zealand	20
5	McKinley Hunt	Canada	15
6	Renee Holmes	New Zealand	12
7	Fancy Bermudez	Canada	10
7	Sara Cline	Canada	10
7	Ruahei Demant	New Zealand	10
7	Claire Gallagher	Canada	10
7	Patricia Maliepo	New Zealand	10
7	Hope Rogers	United States	10
7	Kennedy Simon	New Zealand	10
7	Maya Stewart	Australia	10

=== Most tries ===
Rank	Name	Team	Tries
1	Mererangi Paul	New Zealand	6
2	Katelyn Vaha'akolo	New Zealand	4
3	McKinley Hunt	Canada	3
4	Fancy Bermudez	Canada	2
4	Sara Cline	Canada	2
4	Sophie de Goede	Canada	2
4	Claire Gallagher	Canada	2
4	Patricia Maliepo	New Zealand	2
4	Arabella McKenzie	Australia	2
4	Hope Rogers	United States	2
4	Kennedy Simon	New Zealand	2
4	Maya Stewart	Australia	2

== See also ==
- 2024 Laurie O'Reilly Cup
