= 2026 Women's Super Rugby Champions final =

Women's rugby union match between the Australian and NZ champions

2026 Women's Super Rugby Champions Final
- Event: Super Rugby Champions Final
NSW Waratahs	Blues
17	24
- Match details
- Date: 1 August 2026
- Venue: Leichhardt Oval, Sydney
- Referee: Ella Goldsmith

The 2026 Women's Super Rugby Champions Final is the second edition of the Super Rugby Champions Final, an annual women's rugby union match contested between Australia's Super Rugby Women's champions and New Zealand's Super Rugby Aupiki champions. The match will be played in Sydney on 1 August 2026 between the NSW Waratahs (Australia) and the Blues (New Zealand).

For the second consecutive year, the Blues lifted the trophy after beating the NSW Waratahs 24–17.

== Background ==
On 25 July 2026, the NSW Waratahs beat the Fijian Drua 17–34 in the Super Rugby Women's Grand Final at Four R Stadium in Ba, Fiji. That same day, the Blues defeated Matatū in the Super Rugby Aupiki Grand Final at One NZ Stadium in Christchurch.

The Waratahs and Blues also contested the inaugural Super Rugby Champions final in 2025. The Blues won that match 36–5.

== Road to the final ==
=== Super Rugby Women's – NSW Waratahs ===
2026 Super Rugby Women's standings
Pos	Team	Pld	W	D	L	PF	PA	PD	TB	LB	Pts	Qualification
1	Fijian Drua (RU)	4	3	0	1	150	108	+42	2	0	14	Finals
2	Western Force	4	3	0	1	109	87	+22	1	1	14	Finals
3	New South Wales Waratahs (C)	4	2	0	2	111	100	+11	0	2	10	Finals
4	Queensland Reds	4	1	0	3	72	105	−33	0	2	6	Finals
5	ACT Brumbies	4	1	0	3	77	119	−42	0	0	4	

Source: Super Rugby Women's
(C) Champions; (RU) Runners-up.

==== Play-offs ====
Semi-finals
18 July 2026 – Perth
Western Force	22
NSW Waratahs	33

Grand Final
25 July 2026 – Ba
Fijian Drua	17
NSW Waratahs	34

=== Super Rugby Aupiki – Blues ===
2026 Super Rugby Aupiki standings
Pos	Team	Pld	W	D	L	PF	PA	PD	TF	TA	TB	LB	Pts	Qualification
1	Matatū (RU)	6	4	0	2	198	157	+41	30	24	2	1	19	Super Rugby Aupiki Grand Final
2	Blues Women (C)	6	4	0	2	200	160	+40	32	22	1	1	18	Super Rugby Aupiki Grand Final
3	Hurricanes Poua	6	4	0	2	181	183	−2	24	29	0	1	17	
4	Chiefs Manawa	6	0	0	6	164	243	−79	26	37	0	2	2	

Source: Super Rugby Aupiki - Team standings
(C) Champions; (RU) Runners-up.

==== Play-offs ====
Grand Final
Matatū	21
Blues	28

== Final ==
1 August 2026
17:30 AEST (UTC+10)

NSW Waratahs	17–24	Blues
Try: Maya Stewart 6'; Waiaria Ellis 24'; Brittany Merlo 61'; Con: Tia Hinds (1/3) 25'		Try: Chryss Viliko 14'; Katelyn Vaha'akolo (2) 18', 40+2'; Maia Roos 54'; Con: Braxton Sorensen-McGee (2/4) 15', 55'

Leichhardt Oval, Sydney
Referee: Ella Goldsmith (Australia)

LP	1	(Australia) Brianna Hoy
HK	2	(Australia) Brittany Merlo
TP	3	(Australia) Faliki Pohiva
LL	4	(Australia) Leilani Nathan
RL	5	(Australia) Kaitlan Leaney
BF	6	(Australia) Ruby Anderson
OF	7	(Australia) Emily Chancellor (c)
N8	8	(Australia) Piper Duck
SH	9	(Australia) Tia Hinds
FH	10	(Australia) Waiaria Ellis
LW	11	(Australia) Edie Burke
IC	12	(Australia) Lusiana Vesikula
OC	13	(Netherlands) Pleuni Kievit
RW	14	(Australia) Maya Stewart
FB	15	(Australia) Caitlyn Halse
Replacements:
HK	16	(Australia) Siusiuosalafai Volkman
PR	17	(Australia) Emily Robinson
PR	18	(Australia) Bridie O'Gorman
LK	19	(Australia) Grace Gillies
LF	20	(Australia) Nicole Nathan
LF	21	(Australia) Taj Heald
SH	22	(Australia) Piper Simons
OC	23	(Australia) Anaia Cruickshank
Coach:
(Australia) Mike Ruthven

LP	1	(New Zealand) Chryss Viliko
HK	2	(New Zealand) Grace Gago
TP	3	(New Zealand) Aldora Itunu
LL	4	(New Zealand) Maia Roos (c)
RL	5	(New Zealand) Eloise Blackwell
BF	6	(New Zealand) Amarante Sititi
OF	7	(New Zealand) Taufa Bason
N8	8	(New Zealand) Liana Mikaele-Tu'u
SH	9	(New Zealand) Tara Turner
FH	10	(New Zealand) Hazel Tubic
LW	11	(New Zealand) Katelyn Vaha'akolo
IC	12	(New Zealand) Hollyrae Mete
OC	13	(New Zealand) Sylvia Brunt
RW	14	(New Zealand) Sariyah Paitai
FB	15	(New Zealand) Braxton Sorensen-McGee
Replacements:
HK	16	(New Zealand) Danny-Elle Alefosio Fesolai	(yellow card) 61'
PR	17	(Japan) Nijiho Nagata
PR	18	(New Zealand) Harono Te Iringa
LK	19	(New Zealand) Zara Feaunati
LF	20	(New Zealand) Tafito Lafaele
SH	21	(New Zealand) Ffion Penney
FH	22	(New Zealand) Ruahei Demant
WG	23	(New Zealand) Mererangi Paul
Coach:
(New Zealand) Willie Walker

Assistant referees:
Jess Ling (Australia)
Amber McLachlan (Australia)

TMO:
Rachel Horton (Australia)

== See also ==
- 2026 Super Rugby Aupiki season
- 2026 Super Rugby Women's season
