= Australia A women's national rugby union team =

Second women's national rugby union team of Australia

Australia A Women
- Union: Rugby Australia
- Head coach: Sam Needs
- Captain: Emily Chancellor

First international
- Australia A 17–20 Samoa (6 September 2024)

Biggest win
- Australia A 50–22 Samoa (28 June 2025)

Biggest defeat
- Australia A 17–20 Samoa (6 September 2024)

The Australia A Women is the second women's national rugby union team of Australia, after the Wallaroos, Australia's national women's team.

== History ==
In 2022, as part of their Australian tour, a female Australian Barbarians side played Japan, with the visitors winning 24–10.

In 2024, Rugby Australia announced the launch of a new Australia A program. Similar to the Australia A national rugby union team for the men, the side serves as a development team for Super Rugby Women's players transitioning to the Wallaroos. They played their inaugural match against Samoa, losing 17–20.

In 2025, in a rematch of the 2024 fixture, Australia A beat Samoa at Viking Park in Canberra, 50–22 in a dominant victory. Wallaroos Assistant Coach, Sam Needs, coached the side.

== Results ==
Date	Venue	Opponent	Score	Notes
6 September 2024	Apia Park, Apia	Samoa	17–20	
28 June 2025	Viking Park, Canberra	Samoa	50–22	

== Current squad ==
On 26 June 2025, a 25-player squad was named for Australia A's match against Samoa at Viking Park in Canberra.

Players in bold are players capped by the senior Australian women's national team, the Wallaroos.

Forwards
Player	Position	Club
Brittany Merlo	Hooker	NSW Waratahs
**Adiana Talakai**	Hooker	NSW Waratahs
**Bree-Anna Browne**	Prop	Queensland Reds
**Sally Fuesaina**	Prop	ACT Brumbies
**Lydia Kavoa**	Prop	ACT Brumbies
**Alapeta Ngauamo**	Prop	Western Force
**Faliki Pohiva**	Prop	NSW Waratahs
Lily Bone	Lock	ACT Brumbies
**Annabelle Codey**	Lock	NSW Waratahs
**Ashley Fernandez**	Lock	ACT Brumbies
**Tiarah Minns**	Lock	Queensland Reds
**Ruby Anderson**	Loose forward	NSW Waratahs
**Emily Chancellor** (c)	Loose forward	NSW Waratahs
**Piper Duck**	Loose forward	NSW Waratahs
**Tabua Tuinakauvadra**	Loose forward	ACT Brumbies

Backs
Player	Position	Club
**Samantha Wood**	Scrum-half	Western Force
**Natalie Wright**	Scrum-half	Queensland Reds
**Tia Hinds**	Fly-half	ACT Brumbies
**Arabella McKenzie**	Centre	NSW Waratahs
Manu'a Moleka	Centre	ACT Brumbies
**Waiaria Ellis**	Outside back	NSW Waratahs
**Charlotte Caslick**	Outside back	Queensland Reds
**Lori Cramer** (vc)	Outside back	Queensland Reds
Piper Flynn	Outside back	Queensland Reds
Caitlin Urwin	Outside back	Queensland Reds

== See also ==
- Australia A national rugby union team
- Australia women's national rugby union team
- Wallabies
