= 2026 Super Rugby Women's season =

Australian women's rugby union season

- Countries: Australia (4 teams); Fiji (1 team)
- Tournament format(s): Round-robin and knockout
- Official website: Super Rugby Women's

The 2026 Super Rugby Women's season was the ninth edition of the Super Rugby Women's competition. It started on June 6 and conclude on July 26, with the Women's Super Rugby Champions final to be played on August 1 in Sydney. The competition has previously been held earlier in the year, but changed to "more effectively align with the Wallaroos program leading into their WXV Global Series campaign." There will be five rounds of the regular season played, with the top four teams at the end of the season qualifying for the semi-finals.

== Teams ==
Union	Team	Coach	Captain	Location(s)	Stadia	Capacity
Australia	ACT Brumbies	James Erwin	TBC	Wanniassa, Australian Capital Territory	Viking Park	7,000
Australia	New South Wales Waratahs	Michael Ruthven	TBC	Sydney, New South Wales	Leichhardt Oval	20,000
Australia	Queensland Reds	Andrew Fraser	TBC	Herston, Queensland	Ballymore Stadium	6,000
Australia	Western Force	Dylan Parsons	TBC	Perth, Western Australia	Palmyra Rugby Club	20,500
Fiji	Fijiana Drua	Ifereimi Rawaqa	TBC	Nadi, Ba Province	King Charles Park	18,000

== Ladder ==
2026 Super Rugby Women's standings
Pos	Team	Pld	W	D	L	PF	PA	PD	TB	LB	Pts	Qualification
1	Fijian Drua (RU)	4	3	0	1	150	108	+42	2	0	14	Finals
2	Western Force	4	3	0	1	109	87	+22	1	1	14	Finals
3	New South Wales Waratahs (C)	4	2	0	2	111	100	+11	0	2	10	Finals
4	Queensland Reds	4	1	0	3	72	105	−33	0	2	6	Finals
5	ACT Brumbies	4	1	0	3	77	119	−42	0	0	4	

Source: Super Rugby Women's
Rules for classification: Tiebreakers for teams tied on points: 1) Number of matches won; 2) Head-to-head record; 3) Difference between points for and against; 4) Total number of points for.
(C) Champions; (RU) Runners-up;

== Matches ==
=== Round 1 ===
6 June
2:05 PM

New South Wales Waratahs	42–29	Fijian Drua
Try: Friedrichs (2) 4' c, 27' c Miller (2) 17' c, 65' c Duck 13' c Chancellor 55' c Con: Miller (6/6) 4', 13', 17', 27', 55', 65'	Match Centre; Highlights	Try: Raitubu 32' c Yee 43' c Naisewa 59' m Naihamu 77' c Con: Vueti (3/4) 33', 44', 78'; Pen: Vueti (1/1) 2'

Leichhardt Oval, Sydney
Referee: Amber McLachlan

7 June
1:05 PM

Queensland Reds	12–15	ACT Brumbies
Try: Karpani 19' m Vatua-Tuai 58' c Con: Vatua-Tuai (1/2) 58'	Match Centre; Highlights	Try: Naden 25' m Wong 30' c Con: Molea (1/2) 31'; Pen: Molea (1/1) 81'

Ballymore Stadium, Brisbane

Bye/s: Western Force

=== Round 2 ===
13 June
12:05 PM

Fijian Drua	29–24	Western Force
Try: Qoro (2) 56' c, 67' m Naihamu 37' m Vueti 48' m Raitubu 64' c Con: Rokowati (0/1); Vueti (2/4) 57', 65'	Match Centre; Highlights; Reports	Try: Sikimeti 10' c Buleki 35'; Wood 51'; Con: Wood (3/3) 11', 35'; Pen: Wood (1/1) 42'

King Charles Park, Nadi
Referee: Amber McLachlan

14 June
2:05 PM

ACT Brumbies	17–29	New South Wales Waratahs
Try: Wong 24' c Bone 45' m Fernandez de Corres 77' m Con: Moleka (1/3) 24'	Match Centre; Highlights; Report	Try: Leaney (2) 10' c, 40' c Merlo 6' c Chancellor 20' m Con: Miller (3/4) 6', 10', 40'; Pen: Miller (1/1) 80'

Viking Park, Canberra
Referee: Ella Goldsmith

Bye/s: Queensland Reds

=== Round 3 ===
20 June
12:05 PM

Fijian Drua	42–25	ACT Brumbies
Try: Tove (2) 2' m, 74' m Naihamu (2) 13' m, 80' c Waisega 16' m Neivosa 33' m Railumu 48' m Naisewa 61' m Con: TBC(1/8) Qoro 80'	Match Centre; Highlights; Reports	Try: Bishop (3) 11' m, 22' m, 39' m Brewer 37' m Naden 68' m Con: Ryan (0/3); Paraone (0/2); Pen: Ryan (0/1)

King Charles Park, Nadi
Referee: Ella Goldsmith

20 June
2:05 PM

Western Force	21–17	Queensland Reds
Try: Malcolm Heke 6' c Leonard 70' c Dickson 80' c Con: Wood (3/3) 7', 70', 80'	Match Centre; Highlights; Report	Try: Setu 9' m Spillane 20' m Molloy 36' C Con: Cramer (1/3) 36'

Wanneroo Rugby Club

Bye/s: New South Wales Waratahs

=== Round 4 ===
27 June
2:05 PM

Western Force	28–21	New South Wales Waratahs
Try: Smith (2) 46' c, 54' c Buleki 16' c Malcolm Heke 60' c Con: Wood (4/4) 16', 47', 55', 60'	Match Centre; Highlights; Reports	Try: Whitaker 4' c Miller 21' c Pohiva 32' c Con: Miller (3/3) 4', 21', 32'

Palmyra Rugby Club, Perth

27 June
2:05 PM

Queensland Reds	17–50	Fijian Drua
Try: Karpani 35' m Flynn 74' m Wightman-Beaven 78' c Con: (1/3) Wightman-Beaven 78'	Match Centre; Highlights; Reports	Try: Naihamu 3' c Qoro 19' c Robanakadavu 25' c Raitubu 28' m Waisega 37' c Vueti 49' c Ditavutu 68' c Con: Qoro 6/7; Pen: Qoro (1/1) 80'

Ballymore Stadium, Brisbane
Referee: Amber McLachlan

Bye/s: ACT Brumbies

=== Round 5 ===
5 July 2026
14:05 AEST (UTC+10)

ACT Brumbies	20–36	Western Force
Try: Linda Emelio 19'; Jess Grant 31'; Paua Lee Going 66'; Con: Merania Paraone (1/3) 20'; Pen: Merania Paraone (1/1) 43'; Cards: Tania Naden (yellow card) 5'	Report	Try: Hera-Barb Malcolm Heke 4'; Adi Vani Buleki 7'; Samantha Wood 27'; Atawhai Hotene 35'; Yuna Sato 65'; Taylor Waterson 79'; Con: Samantha Wood (3/6) 28', 36', 66'; Cards: Cecilia Smith (red card) 11'; Alapeta Ngauamo (yellow card) 44'

Viking Park, Canberra
Referee: Ella Goldsmith

5 July 2026
16:05 AEST (UTC+10)

New South Wales Waratahs	19–26	Queensland Reds
Try: Lusiana Vesikula 8'; Amelia Whitaker 33'; Brittany Merlo 45'; Con: Desiree Miller (2/3) 9', 34'; Cards: Pleuni Kievit (yellow card) 37'	Report	Try: Lucy Thorpe 16'; Zoe Hanna 21'; Eva Karpani 27'; Penalty try 36'; Con: Lori Cramer (2/3) 22', 28'

Leichhardt Oval, Sydney

Bye/s: Fijian Drua

== Finals ==
Semi-finals
18 July 2026 – Lautoka
Fijian Drua	31
Queensland Reds	5
18 July 2026 – Perth
Western Force	22
NSW Waratahs	33

Grand Final
25 July 2026 – Ba
Fijian Drua	17
NSW Waratahs	34

=== Semi-finals ===
18 July 2026
13:05 FJT (UTC+12)

Fijian Drua	31–5	Queensland Reds
Try: Salaseini Railumu 11'; Karalaini Naisewa 24'; Atelaite Buna 28'; Kolora Lomani (2) 47', 64'; Con: Varanisese Qoro (3/5) 12', 25', 65'; Cards: Nunia Daunimoala (yellow card) 39'	Report	Try: Charlie Brigstocke 23; Con: Lori Cramer (0/1)

Churchill Park, Lautoka

18 July 2026
14:00 AWST (UTC+8)

Western Force	22–33	New South Wales Waratahs
Try: Hera-Barb Malcolm Heke 40+1'; Aiysha Wigley 46'; Adi Vani Buleki 65'; Keira MacAskill 80'; Con: Samantha Wood (1/3) 40+1'; Grace Freeman (0/1); Cards: Hera-Barb Malcolm Heke (yellow card) 20'	Report	Try: Tia Hinds (2) 3', 34'; Amelia Whitaker (2) 21', 30'; Desiree Miller 49'; Con: Desiree Miller (4/5) 4', 31', 35', 50'

HBF Park, Perth
Referee: Amber McLachlan

=== Grand Final ===
25 July 2026
13:05 FJT (UTC+12)

Fijian Drua	17–34	New South Wales Waratahs
Try: Nunia Daunimoala (2) 59', 70'; Sulita Waisega 80'; Con: Litiana Vueti (0/1); Varanisese Qoro (1/2) 80+1'	Report	Try: Maya Stewart 19'; Desiree Miller 27'; Faliki Pohiva 44'; Rosie Ferguson 51'; Amelia Whittaker (2) 62', 68'; Con: Desiree Miller (2/6) 20', 45'

Four R Stadium, Ba
Attendance: 4,097
Referee: Ella Goldsmith

== See also ==
- 2026 Super Rugby Aupiki season
- 2026 Super Rugby Pacific season
