= Atlanta Lolohea =

New Zealand rugby union player

- Born: 16 April 2003 (age 23)
- Height: 160 cm (5 ft 3 in)
- Notable relative: Martha Mataele (sister)

Rugby union career
- Position: Hooker
Provincial / State sides
Years	Team	Apps	(Points)
2022–2023	Canterbury	13	(10)
Super Rugby
Years	Team	Apps	(Points)
2023–2025	Matatū	8	(0)
2025–	Blues Women	7	(10)
International career
Years	Team	Apps	(Points)
2024–	New Zealand	10	(10)
Medal record
Women's rugby union
Representing New Zealand
World Cup
Bronze medal – third place	2025 England	Team competition

Atlanta Lolohea (born 16 April 2003) is a New Zealand rugby union player. She plays for the Blues Women in the Super Rugby Aupiki competition.

== Rugby career ==
Lolohea attended Villa Maria College in Christchurch and began playing rugby in Year 11 when she was 16. She made her Farah Palmer Cup debut for Canterbury against Wellington in 2022 and was awarded most promising FPC player of the year alongside Hannah King.

She is the younger sister of Matatū teammate, Martha Mataele. They were both part of Matatū's championship side for the 2023 Super Rugby Aupiki season, with Mataele debuting for the Black Ferns later that year. She also played for the Western Force in the 2023 Super W season.

In 2023, She played for the Black Ferns XV against the Manusina XV in September and was later called into the Black Ferns as injury cover during the final week of the WXV1 tournament in New Zealand.

Lolohea secured her first full-time Black Ferns contract in April 2024. She made her Black Ferns debut against Australia on 14 July in the second test of the Laurie O'Reilly Cup. She scored a try on her debut as her side hammered the Wallaroos 62–0.

In July 2025, she was named in the Black Ferns side to the Women's Rugby World Cup in England.
