= Claire Gallagher =

Canada international rugby union player

- Born: 20 April 2000 (age 26)
- Height: 162 cm (5 ft 4 in)
- Weight: 70 kg (154 lb)

Rugby union career
- Position: Fly-half
- Current team: Trailfinders
Senior career
Years	Team	Apps	(Points)
2024–2025	Leicester Tigers	20	(56)
2025–	Trailfinders		(0)
International career
Years	Team	Apps	(Points)
2023–	Canada	19	(20)
Medal record
Representing Canada
Women's rugby union
World Cup
Silver medal – second place	2025 England	Team competition

Claire Gallagher (born 20 April 2000) is a Canadian rugby union player. She competed for Canada at the 2025 Women's Rugby World Cup.

== Early career ==
Gallagher played hockey and soccer growing up and did not play her first game of rugby until she was in high school.

== Rugby career ==
Gallagher made her international debut for Canada during the 2023 Pacific Four Series on 8 July against New Zealand in Ottawa. A week later, she scored her first international try in her sides 45–7 win against the Wallaroos. She then featured for Canada in the inaugural 2023 WXV 1 tournament, she played against Wales and England as her side finished second.

In January 2024, she joined Leicester Tigers from the Aurora Barbarians and the University of Ottawa in Canada. She started in all six of Canada's Test matches in 2024 and was part of the side that defeated the Black Ferns for the first time during the Pacific Four Series.

In 2025, she signed with Trailfinders having previously played for Leicester Tigers. She was named in the Canadian side for the 2025 Women's Rugby World Cup in England.
