= Sally Fuesaina =

Australia international rugby union player

- Born: 15 February 1992 (age 34)
- Height: 164 cm (5 ft 5 in)

Rugby union career
- Position: Prop
Super Rugby
Years	Team	Apps	(Points)
2023–	ACT Brumbies	12	
International career
Years	Team	Apps	(Points)
2024–	Australia	4	(0)

Sally Fuesaina (born 15 February 1992) is an Australian rugby union player. She represents Australia internationally and plays for the ACT Brumbies in the Super Rugby Women's competition.

== Early life ==
Fuesaina played rugby league and rugby union as a child, but stopped at the age of twelve and only started playing rugby union again in her late teens.

== Rugby career ==
Fuesaina joined the Western Sydney Two Blues women’s team in 2022, she then made her Super Rugby Women's debut for the ACT Brumbies against the Fijian Drua in 2023.

She made her international debut for Australia against Canada in the 2024 Pacific Four Series, she came off the bench in the 72nd minute of the match. She also featured in the games against the Black Ferns and the United States. In July 2024, she was set to play for Australia A against Samoa in Apia after missing out on selection for the Wallaroos, but was called-up for the senior side as an injury replacement for Brianna Hoy.

Fuesaina also appeared for the triumphant Wallaroos in their maiden WXV 2 title win in South Africa.

In 2025, she was part of the Wallaroos 46-player contracted squad that was announced for the season. She represented Australia A against Samoa in Canberra.

== Personal life ==
Fuesaina is the mother of two daughters, Athena and Luna. She suffered post-partum depression after having Luna, her return to rugby helped her recovery and led to her playing for the ACT Brumbies and Wallaroos.
