= Allana Sikimeti =

Australia international rugby union player

- Born: 2 July 2004 (age 22) Redcliffe, Queensland, Australia
- Height: 178 cm (5 ft 10 in)

Rugby union career
- Position: Prop
Senior career
Years	Team	Apps	(Points)
2025	Tokyo Sankyu Phoenix		
Super Rugby
Years	Team	Apps	(Points)
2024	ACT Brumbies	6	(0)
2025–	Western Force		
International career
Years	Team	Apps	(Points)
2024–	Australia	3	(0)

Allana Sikimeti (born 2 July 2004) is an Australian rugby union player. She plays Prop for Australia at an international level. She plays for the Western Force in the Super Rugby Women's competition, and formerly played for the ACT Brumbies.

== Rugby career ==
Sikimeti grew up in a working-class family. Her father was often away, he worked on a FIFO (fly-in/fly-out) basis, and her mother was a caregiver for the elderly. She began playing rugby union at the age of fifteen. She played for the North Brisbane Rugby Club.

Frustrated by her lack of opportunities in the first team, she received a call from Scott Fava who was the coach of the ACT Brumbies then. He promised her playing time with his team. She then left Queensland and her family home for Canberra to try her luck with the ACT Brumbies. She played her first Super Rugby Women's season for the team in 2024.

In April 2024, she was selected by Joanne Yapp to play in the Australian side for the Pacific Four Series, but did not play any matches. She was called up once again for the July tests against Fiji and the Black Ferns. On July 6, she made her international debut for Australia in Sydney against Fiji. She was not called up to the first squad selection for the WXV 2 tournament due to injury. However, she returned during the competition and played in the match against South Africa.

In January 2025, it was announced that she had joined the Western Force for the 2025 Super Rugby Women's season. She had a stint with Tokyo Sankyu Phoenix in Japan due to their partnership with the Force.
