= Leilani Nathan =

Australia international rugby union player

- Born: 20 July 2000 (age 26)
- Height: 170 cm (5 ft 7 in)
- School: St Francis Xavier's College, Hamilton

Rugby union career
- Position: Backrow
Super Rugby
Years	Team	Apps	(Points)
2023–	NSW Waratahs	13	(0)
International career
Years	Team	Apps	(Points)
2023–	Australia	8	(0)

Leilani Nathan (born 20 July 2000) is an Australian rugby union player. She plays in the Backrow for Australia internationally and for the NSW Waratahs in the Super Rugby Women's competition.

== Rugby career ==
Nathan made her debut for the NSW Waratahs in the Super Rugby Women's competition in 2023. Later that year, she made her international debut for the Wallaroos against New Zealand.

She was selected for the Wallaroos squad to the 2024 Pacific Four Series. She started in the match against the Black Ferns. She received a knee injury and was ruled out of the side for the WXV 2 tournament in September.

On 11 February 2025, she was named in the Wallaroos 46-player contracted squad. In April, she sustained a severe knee injury during the Waratahs semi-final victory against the Western Force and was ruled out for the grand final.

== Personal life ==
Outside of rugby, she is a What Ability ambassador and is passionate about working with people with a disability. Nathan's twin sister, Nicole, also plays for the Waratahs.
