= Hera-Barb Malcolm Heke =

Australia international rugby union player

- Born: 29 January 2000 (age 26) Tauranga, New Zealand
- Height: 163 cm (5 ft 4 in)

Rugby union career
- Position: Hooker
Super Rugby
Years	Team	Apps	(Points)
2022–	Western Force	24	(0)
International career
Years	Team	Apps	(Points)
2024–	Australia	3	(0)

Hera-Barb Malcolm Heke (born 29 January 2000) is an Australian rugby union player. She represents Australia internationally and plays for the Western Force in the Super Rugby Women's competition.

== Rugby career ==
Malcolm Heke was born in Tauranga, New Zealand. She has played club rugby for the Kalamunda Rugby Club, and debuted for the Western Force in the Super Rugby Women's competition in 2019.

She came off the bench in her international debut for Australia against Canada in the 2024 Pacific Four Series. In September that year, she represented Australia A against Samoa in Apia.

In December 2025, she re-signed with the Western Force for the 2026 Super Rugby Women's season.
