= Alapeta Ngauamo =

Australia international rugby union player

- Born: 11 July 1989 (age 37)
- Height: 171 cm (5 ft 7 in)
- Weight: 115 kg (254 lb; 18 st 2 lb)

Rugby union career
- Position: Prop
Super Rugby
Years	Team	Apps	(Points)
2022–2023	Queensland Reds	10	(0)
2024–	Western Force	11	(0)
International career
Years	Team	Apps	(Points)
2024–2025	Australia	5	(0)

Alapeta Ngauamo (born 11 July 1989) is an Australian rugby union player. She represented Australia internationally before announcing her retirement at the end of 2025. She played for the Queensland Reds before switching to the Western Force in the Super Rugby Women's competition.

== Early career ==
Ngauamo played futsal as a teenager and represented Australia's under-18s team.

== Rugby career ==
Ngauamo played for the Wests Bulldogs rugby club in 2024. She started her Super Rugby Women's career playing for the Queensland Reds before switching to the Western Force in 2024.

She earned her first international cap on 14 September 2024 against Ireland in Dublin in the first match of the Wallaroos end-of-year tour. She created history when she debuted for the Wallaroos, as she was the oldest player to make her debut for the side. She made her second appearance against Wales before travelling with the Australian squad to the WXV 2 tournament in South Africa.

Ngauamo played her last test for Australia against Wales on 1 August 2025 at North Sydney Oval. It was the final warm-up match for the Wallaroos just before the World Cup in England, her side won 36–5. In November that year, following the conclusion of the World Cup, she announced her retirement from international rugby.

She re-signed with the Western Force for the 2026 Super Rugby Women’s season.

== Personal life ==
Ngauamo is of Tongan descent. She comes from a family of eight with all her siblings playing rugby in Queensland, including her three sisters.
