= Caitlyn Halse =

Australian rugby union player

- Born: 18 September 2006 (age 20) Campbelltown, Sydney
- Height: 174 cm (5 ft 9 in)
- Weight: 76 kg (168 lb; 12 st 0 lb)
- School: Magdalene Catholic College, Westfields Sports High School

Rugby union career
- Position: Fullback
Super Rugby
Years	Team	Apps	(Points)
2023–Present	NSW Waratahs	14	(25)
International career
Years	Team	Apps	(Points)
2024–	Australia	15	(30)

Caitlyn Halse (born 19 September 2006) is an Australian rugby union player. She plays for the NSW Waratahs in the Super Rugby Women's competition.

== Rugby career ==
Halse first started playing rugby league as a six year old before starting rugby union at eight. In 2023, she broke the record for youngest Super Rugby player when she debuted for the Waratahs at age 16. She also became the youngest player to represent New South Wales in fifteens, male or female.

She was involved in the Wallaroos 2023 camp but did not get selected.

Halse was selected in the Wallaroos 30-member squad for the 2024 Pacific Four Series on 30 April. She created history when she made her Wallaroos test debut against the United States on 17 May 2024 in Melbourne. She became the youngest-ever Australian to play test rugby, male or female, at 17 years, 242 days.

In 2025, she was named in the Wallaroos side for the Women's Rugby World Cup in England.
