= Samantha Wood (rugby union) =

Australia international rugby union player

- Born: 17 July 2004 (age 22) Perth, Western Australia
- Height: 165 cm (5 ft 5 in)

Rugby union career
- Position: Scrum-half
Super Rugby
Years	Team	Apps	(Points)
2023–	Western Force		
International career
Years	Team	Apps	(Points)
2024–	Australia	11	(26)
2024–2025	Australia A	2	

Samantha Wood (born 17 July 2004) is an Australian rugby union player. She represents Australia internationally and plays for the Western Force in the Super Rugby Women's competition. She competed for Australia at the 2025 Women's Rugby World Cup.

== Early life and career ==
Wood grew up on her parents’ 10-acre property in Roleystone in Perth’s hills and attended John Wollaston School. She wanted to play rugby after attending her brother’s training session.

She began her rugby career at Arks Rugby Club.

== Rugby career ==
Wood's made her debut for the Western Force in the Super Rugby Women's competition in 2023.

On 11 May 2024, she made her international debut for Australia against Canada in the Pacific Four Series. She later represented Australia A against Samoa in September at Apia Park in Samoa.

Wood's was ruled out for the 2025 Super Rugby Women's season due to shoulder and back injuries. She featured for Australia in their two-Test series against Wales ahead of the World Cup. She was named in the Wallaroos squad for the 2025 Women's Rugby World Cup in England.

In December 2025, she re-signed with the Force for the 2026 Super Rugby Women's season.
