= Faliki Pohiva =

Australia international rugby union player

- Born: 16 April 2001 (age 25)
- Height: 173 cm (5 ft 8 in)
- Weight: 114 kg (251 lb; 17 st 13 lb)

Rugby union career
- Position: Prop
Super Rugby
Years	Team	Apps	(Points)
2021–	NSW Waratahs		
International career
Years	Team	Apps	(Points)
2024–2025	Australia A	2	(0)
2025–	Australia	8	(0)

Faliki Pohiva (born 16 April 2001) is an Australian rugby union player. She competed for Australia at the 2025 Women's Rugby World Cup.

== Rugby career ==
Pohiva made her debut for the NSW Waratahs in the Super Rugby Women's competition in 2021. She played for the Australian Barbarians side against Japan in 2022.

In 2024, she was named in the Australian A squad for their tour of Samoa.

In 2025, she starred for the Waratahs when they retained their Super Rugby Women's title in the grand final after beating the Queensland Reds.

Pohiva made her test debut for Australia against Fiji in May 2025. She was subsequently selected in the Wallaroos side for the Women's Rugby World Cup in England.

She re-signed a new Wallaroos national contract with Rugby Australia at the end of 2025 following the Rugby World Cup.

== Personal life ==
Pohiva took a break from rugby following the birth of her daughter, Liliana.
