= Marcelle Parkes =

New Zealand rugby union player (born 1997)

- Born: 9 September 1997 (age 29)
- Height: 1.78 m (5 ft 10 in)
- Weight: 78 kg (172 lb)

Rugby union career
- Position: Flanker
Provincial / State sides
Years	Team	Apps	(Points)
2018, 2020	Wellington	8	(0)
2021–2023	Canterbury	21	(20)
Super Rugby
Years	Team	Apps	(Points)
2022–Present	Matatū	10	(0)
International career
Years	Team	Apps	(Points)
2018–	New Zealand	7	(0)

Marcelle Parkes (born 9 September 1997) is a New Zealand rugby union player. She has played for the New Zealand women's national rugby union team internationally and for Matatū in the Super Rugby Aupiki competition. She has represented Wellington and Canterbury in the Farah Palmer Cup.

== Rugby career ==
In 2018, Parkes was one of 28 players who were contracted by New Zealand Rugby for the Black Ferns. They were the first women to receive professional contracts in such a historic occasion. She made her international debut for New Zealand on 9 November against France at Toulon.

Parkes played against Canada, France and England at the 2019 Women's Rugby Super Series at San Diego. She signed with Matatū for the inaugural season of Super Rugby Aupiki in 2022.

On 23 September 2023, she was part of the Black Ferns XVs team that played the Manusina XV's side at the Navigation Homes Stadium in Pukekohe.

In July 2025, she was named in the Black Ferns XVs side for the trial match against the Black Ferns in Whangārei.
