= Katelyn Vaha'akolo =

New Zealand international dual-code rugby player

Katelyn Vahaakolo
Personal information
- Born: 18 April 2000 (age 26) Auckland, New Zealand
- Height: 170 cm (5 ft 7 in)
- Weight: 76 kg (12 st 0 lb)

Playing information

Rugby league
- Position: Wing
Club
Years	Team	Pld	T	G	FG	P
2020	Te Atatū Roosters
2021	Newcastle Knights	5	1	0	0	4
2022	Pt Chevalier Pirates	13	10	0	0	40
	Total	18	11	0	0	44
Representative
Years	Team	Pld	T	G	FG	P
2020–22	New Zealand	5	5	0	0	20
2022	Māori All Stars	1	0	0	0	0

Rugby union
- Position: Wing
Club
Years	Team	Pld	T	G	FG	P
2023–	Blues Women	26	21	0	0	105
Representative
Years	Team	Pld	T	G	FG	P
2023–	New Zealand	20	25	0	0	125
2024–	New Zealand 7s		32	0	0	160
- Source: As of 18 November 2026

Medal record

Women's rugby union

Representing New Zealand

World Cup
Bronze medal – third place	2025 England	Team competition

Katelyn Vaha'akolo (born 18 April 2000) is a New Zealand rugby league and union player. She played wing for the Kiwi Ferns at the 2021 Women's Rugby League World Cup and for the Newcastle Knights in the NRL Women's Premiership. She joined the Blues for the 2023 Super Rugby Aupiki season.

== Background ==
Born in New Zealand, Vaha'akolo is a New Zealander of Māori (Ngāpuhi and Ngāti Whātua descent) and Tongan descent. She is the younger sister of Freedom Vaha'akolo who played for the Highlanders in Super Rugby.

== Rugby league career ==
In 2020, Vaha'akolo played for the Te Atatu Roosters and Akarana Falcons. In November 2020, she represented the Kiwi Ferns. In December 2021, she signed with the Newcastle Knights to be a part of their inaugural NRLW squad.

In February 2022, Vaha'akolo played for the Māori All Stars against the Indigenous All Stars. In Round 1 of the delayed 2021 NRL Women's season, she made her NRLW debut for the Knights against the Parramatta Eels. She played in 5 matches for the Knights, scoring one try, before parting ways with the club at the end of the season. She then joined the Pt Chevalier Pirates club in the Auckland Rugby League competition for the 2022 season. She scored at least 10 tries for them, though there were several matches without scorers submitted.

In October, she was selected for the New Zealand squad at the delayed 2021 Women's Rugby League World Cup in England.

== Rugby union career ==
In April 2021, she played for the Moana Pasifika rugby union side in the Takiwhitu Tūturu rugby sevens competition. It was announced in November 2022 that she would be joining the Blues Women for the 2023 Super Rugby Aupiki season.

=== 2023 ===
On 17 April, Vaha'akolo was given a fulltime Black Ferns contract after a standout season for the Blues Women. She was one of 34 contracted players for the year.

She made the Black Ferns 30-player squad to compete in the Pacific Four Series and O’Reilly Cup. She made her international debut against Australia on 29 June 2023 at Brisbane. In July, she started in the Black Ferns 21–52 victory over Canada at the Pacific Four Series in Ottawa. In September, Vaha'akolo scored two tries in the Black Ferns' 43–3 victory over Australia.

Vaha'akolo was awarded World Rugby's Women's 15s Breakthrough Player of the Year in November.

=== 2024 ===
Vaha'akolo featured for the Black Ferns in the Pacific Four Series, scoring tries against the United States, Canada and the Wallaroos. She scored four of nine tries in her sides 62–0 drubbing of Australia in the second test of the Laurie O'Reilly Cup.

=== 2025 ===
In July 2025, she was named in the Black Ferns squad to the Women's Rugby World Cup.

=== Sevens ===
On 18 November 2024 it was announced that Vaha'akolo had been selected to be a member of the New Zealand Sevens squad to complete at the Dubai and Cape Town tournaments of the 2024-25 sevens series. As well as providing the team with a winger to cover for the unavailability of Michaela Blyde and Stacy Waaka, her selection was designed to both introduce her to the sevens environment and assist with her pre-season training for Super Rugby Aupiki and then the Women's Rugby World Cup 2025. She has long expressed a wish to play for the New Zealand Sevens team at the Olympics.

She returned to play in all tournaments to date of 2025-26 sevens series.
