= Michaela Leonard =

Australia international rugby union player

- Born: 6 March 1995 (age 31) Canberra
- Height: 1.78 m (5 ft 10 in)
- Weight: 85 kg (187 lb)
- School: St Mary MacKillop College, Canberra

Rugby union career
- Position: Lock
Senior career
| Years | Team | Apps | (Points) |
| 2022–23 | Exeter Chiefs | 4 | (0) |
Super Rugby
| Years | Team | Apps | (Points) |
| 2018–21 | Brumbies | | (0) |
| 2022 | Matatū | 3 | (0) |
| 2023– | Western Force | | (0) |
International career
| Years | Team | Apps | (Points) |
| 2019–Present | Australia | 42 | (0) |

Michaela Lea Leonard (born 6 March 1995) is an Australian rugby union player. She plays at Lock for the Wallaroos and competed at the recent Rugby World Cup in New Zealand. She previously played for the Brumbies before joining the Western Force in the Super W competition. She has also played for Exeter Chiefs and Matatū.

== Personal life ==
Leonard graduated from the University of Canberra with a Bachelor of Physiotherapy.

== Rugby career ==
Leonard played club rugby for Tuggeranong Vikings and played for the Brumbies from 2018 to 2021 in the Super W competition. She only started playing rugby union ahead of the Brumbies tryouts before the inaugural season of Super W in 2018, she was later named Brumbies rookie of the year.

She was named as co-captain of the Brumbies ahead of the 2020 Super W season, but the season was cut short due to the COVID-19 outbreak and the NSW Waratahs were crowned champions.

Leonard made her debut for Australia against Japan in 2019. In 2021, she was named as captain of the Brumbies for the 2021 Super W season.

Leonard and fellow Wallaroo, Arabella McKenzie, both signed with New Zealand club Matatū for the inaugural season of Super Rugby Aupiki in 2022. She was named in Australia's squad for the 2022 Pacific Four Series in New Zealand. She was selected in the Wallaroos squad for a two-test series against the Black Ferns at the Laurie O'Reilly Cup.

Leonard was selected in the team again for the delayed 2022 Rugby World Cup in New Zealand. After the World Cup, she joined Exeter Chiefs for the 2022–23 Premier 15s season.

Leonard signed with the Western Force for the 2023 Super W season.

She was named in the Wallaroos squad for the 2025 Women's Rugby World Cup in England. In December 2025, she re-signed with the Force for the 2026 Super Rugby Women's season.
