= Atasi Lafai =

Australia international rugby union player

- Born: 24 July 1994 (age 32) Sataua, Samoa
- Height: 1.78 m (5 ft 10 in)
- Weight: 88 kg (194 lb)
- School: Sarah Redfern High School

Rugby union career
- Position: Lock
Senior career
Years	Team	Apps	(Points)
	NSW Waratahs		(0)
International career
Years	Team	Apps	(Points)
2018 – present	Australia	4	(0)

Atasi Lafai (born 24 July 1994) is an Australian rugby union player. She competed for Australia at the 2021 Rugby World Cup in New Zealand. She plays for the NSW Waratahs in the Super W competition.

== Rugby career ==
Lafai made her international debut for Australia against New Zealand at the 2018 Laurie O'Reilly Cup.

Lafai was named in the Wallaroos squad for a two-test series against the Black Ferns at the 2022 Laurie O'Reilly Cup. She was selected in the team again for the delayed 2022 Rugby World Cup in New Zealand.

== Personal life ==
Lafai is the younger sister of former St. George Illawarra Dragons centre, Tim Lafai.
