= Ma'ama Mo'onia Vaipulu =

New Zealand rugby union player

Ma'ama Vaipulu
- Born: 26 November 2002 (age 23)
- Height: 185 cm (6 ft 1 in)

Rugby union career
- Position: Lock
Provincial / State sides
Years	Team	Apps	(Points)
2021–Present	Auckland	18	(10)
Super Rugby
Years	Team	Apps	(Points)
2023–Present	Blues Women	19	(15)
International career
Years	Team	Apps	(Points)
2024–	New Zealand	5	(10)

Ma'ama Mo'onia Vaipulu (born 26 November 2002) is a New Zealand rugby union player. She plays Lock for the Blues Women in the Super Rugby Aupiki competition and for Auckland provincially.

== Rugby career ==
Vaipulu made her first appearance in the Farah Palmer Cup for the Auckland Storm in 2021. Two years later she debuted for the Blues against Matatū.

In September 2023, she featured for the Black Ferns XVs side against the Manusina XVs. She was part of the Blues side that won their first Super Rugby Aupiki title in 2024.

In April 2024, she received her first Black Ferns contract. She was then named in the Black Ferns squad for the Pacific Four Series. She started in her test debut against the United States on 11 May 2024 and scored in the 26th minute for the Black Ferns sixth try. Vaipulu became a dual international after her debut as she had previously represented New Zealand in Volleyball.

== Personal life ==
Vaipulu is of Tongan and Māori descent. She attended Aorere College.
