= Lydia Kavoa =

- Born: 8 November 1993 (age 33)
- Height: 170 cm (5 ft 7 in)

Rugby union career
- Position: Prop
Super Rugby
Years	Team	Apps	(Points)
2023–2025	ACT Brumbies	14	(0)
International career
Years	Team	Apps	(Points)
2024–2025	Australia	12	(5)

Lydia Kavoa (born 8 November 1993) is an Australian rugby union player. She competed for Australia at the 2025 Women's Rugby World Cup. She announced her retirement from international rugby in October 2025.

== Early life and career ==
Kavoa was born in New Zealand to Fijian and Tongan parents and was raised in Sydney. She loved watching rugby union and league, but played soccer as a youngster.

She joined the Navy as a 20-year-old and is now a Leading seaman in the Navy People Branch. She discovered rugby while she was in the Navy.

== Rugby career ==
Kavoa started playing rugby in 2016. She played for Navy in the ADF Tri service competition at Ballymore Stadium. She was named rookie of the year and female MVP despite her only playing rugby for three months.

In 2023, she made her Super Rugby Women's debut for ACT Brumbies against the Fijiana Drua in Nadi.

She made her Wallaroos international debut against Fiji in July 2024 aged 30. Later that year, she featured for Australia when they won their maiden WXV 2 title in South Africa in September. She initially made her debut at Flanker before playing her second test at Loosehead prop at the WXV 2 tournament.

In 2025, she was called into the Wallaroos side for the Women's Rugby World Cup in England. She featured in three matches during the tournament and made her last appearance for Australia against Canada in the knockout stage. On 15 October, she announced her retirement from international rugby.
