= Maia Joseph =

New Zealand rugby union player

- Born: 20 May 2002 (age 24)
- School: Columba College
- University: University of Otago
- Notable relative: Jamie Joseph (father)

Rugby union career
- Position(s): First five-eighth, halfback
Provincial / State sides
Years	Team	Apps	(Points)
2020–2023	Otago Spirit	21	(24)
Super Rugby
Years	Team	Apps	(Points)
2024–	Matatū	20	(29)
International career
Years	Team	Apps	(Points)
2024-	New Zealand	23	(15)
Medal record
Women's rugby union
Representing New Zealand
World Cup
Bronze medal – third place	2025 England	Team competition

Maia Joseph (born 25 May 2002) is a New Zealand rugby union player who plays at first five-eighth and halfback for Matatū.

== Early life and family ==
Joseph is the daughter of Mandy Joseph and rugby union coach and former player Jamie Joseph. She began playing at under-5s level for Pōneke in Wellington. She grew up in Dunedin where she was educated at Columba College and played club rugby for University and Dunedin. She studied medicine at the University of Otago, but placed her studies on hold when offered a full-time contract with New Zealand Rugby in 2024.

She competed for New Zealand Touch Blacks Girls U18s in the 2020 Youth Trans Tasman against Australia.

== Rugby union career ==
=== Domestic ===
Joseph played for Otago Spirit, making her Farah Palmer Cup debut for the Spirit in 2020 playing at first five-eighth. She played for the Chiefs Manawa in the inaugural Super Rugby Aupiki competition in 2022. She won the Fiao'o Faamausili Medal FPC Player of the Year at the ASB Rugby Awards in December 2022.

Torn ACL and MCL knee ligaments ruled her out of Super Rugby in 2023, but following rehabilitation she went on to play for the Black Ferns XV. She then made her debut for Matatū where she transitioned from first five-eighth to halfback. She was named the Matatū's rookie of the year at the end of the season.

=== International ===
Joseph trained with the New Zealand rugby sevens team in July 2023. In April 2024, she was given a full-time contract by the New Zealand women's national rugby union team. She started in her test debut against the United States in the Pacific Four Series on 11 May 2024.

In July 2025, she was named in the Black Ferns squad to the Women's Rugby World Cup.
