= Layla Sae =

NZ international rugby union player

- Born: 22 October 2000 (age 26)
- Height: 1.71 m (5 ft 7 in)

Rugby union career
- Position: Loose Forward
Senior career
Years	Team	Apps	(Points)
2025–	Harlequins		
Provincial / State sides
Years	Team	Apps	(Points)
2019–2023	Manawatu	27	(40)
Super Rugby
Years	Team	Apps	(Points)
2022–	Hurricanes Poua	19	(25)
International career
Years	Team	Apps	(Points)
2023–	New Zealand	19	(10)
Medal record
Women's rugby union
Representing New Zealand
World Cup
Bronze medal – third place	2025 England	Team competition

Layla Sae (born 22 October 2000) is a New Zealand rugby union player. She plays for Hurricanes Poua in the Super Rugby Aupiki competition and for Manawatu in the Farah Palmer Cup.

== Early career ==
Sae was diagnosed with type 1 diabetes when she was four. She attended St Peter's College, Palmerston North. In 2018, she travelled to the Philippines to compete in the Rebisco volleyball competition with the U19 Z-Air Māori Volleyball team.

== Rugby career ==
=== 2022 ===
Sae was selected in Hurricanes Poua's inaugural squad for the Super Rugby Aupiki competition. After the Hurricanes missed the opening round due to COVID cases and isolation requirements, Sae made her Super Rugby debut on 15 March 2022 against Chiefs Manawa.

In June 2022, she was part of the Black Ferns Pango sevens team that competed at the 2022 Oceania Women's Sevens Championship.

=== 2023–25 ===
Sae returned for Hurricanes Poua's second season of Super Rugby Aupiki in 2023. She started in the Number 8 position in the opening game of the season. She then moved to the blindside in round two of the competition, they beat Matatū 25–24. In the semifinal match against Chiefs Manawa, Sae crossed the try line in the 55th minute for her first Super Rugby try, however, her side lost 21–43.

On 17 April 2023, Sae was named as one of 34 players who were handed Black Ferns contracts in their build up ahead of the 2025 Rugby World Cup. She made her international debut on 30 September against the Wallaroos at Hamilton.

In July 2025, she was named in the Black Ferns side to the Women's Rugby World Cup in England.

In October 2025, she joined Premiership Women's Rugby team Harlequins as injury cover.
