= Kaipo Olsen-Baker =

New Zealand rugby union player

- Born: 1 May 2002 (age 24) Gisborne, New Zealand
- Height: 1.75 m (5 ft 9 in)
- Weight: 90 kg (198 lb)

Rugby union career
- Position: Number eight
Provincial / State sides
Years	Team	Apps	(Points)
2019–2023	Manawatu	19	(30)
Super Rugby
Years	Team	Apps	(Points)
2022–2025	Hurricanes Poua	7	(5)
2024–	Matatū	19	(65)
International career
Years	Team	Apps	(Points)
2022–	New Zealand	23	(50)
Medal record
Women's rugby union
Representing New Zealand
World Cup
Bronze medal – third place	2025 England	Team competition

Kaipo Olsen-Baker (born 1 May 2002) is a New Zealand rugby union player. She made her Black Ferns test debut in 2022. She also played for Hurricanes Poua and Matatū in the Super Rugby Aupiki competition and represents Manawatu provincially.

== Early life ==
Kaipo Olsen-Baker was born on 1 May 2002 to Gabe Olsen and Jason Baker. Her father played rugby for the Pirates and Horouta clubs, while her mother goal shoot and goal-attack for several Gisborne and East Coast club netball sides. Her early life was spent in Rangitukia, which is located north of Tikitiki on the East Coast of the North island of New Zealand. The family later moved to Gisborne, where she attended Gisborne Girls’ High School.

When she was one years old her father died. Her mother, Gabrielle who is partially paralysed on the left side of her body later had to endure the death of subsequent partner.

She originally played football. Among her teammates were fellow Black Ferns Renee Holmes and Kelsey Teneti. She was introduced to rugby by former Black Fern Trish Hina, but she preferred to concentrate on basketball playing as point guard and at the age of 15 earned a trial with the New Zealand Tall Ferns. Unused to disappointment she quit basketball when she was not selected for the New Zealand team.

She completed her education at Manakura, an elite Māori sporting school in Palmerston North.

== Rugby career ==
It was while she was at Manukura that she began playing both sevens and fifteen-a-side rugby for Manukura School in earnest. While still at school she began playing for the Manawatū Cyclones in the Farah Palmer Cup competition, making her debut in the match against Canterbury on 21 September 2019.

Olsen-Baker signed with Hurricanes Poua for the inaugural season of Super Rugby Aupiki.

=== International debut ===
She was named in the Black Ferns squad for the 2022 Pacific Four Series. Olsen-Baker made her international debut on 5 June 2022 in the test against Australia in Tauranga. Played in torrential rain, she scored a 20-metre runaway try to contribute to her team’s 23-10 victory. Olsen-Baker was named player of the match. She was yellow-carded in her second appearance for New Zealand, in their 28-0 victory against Canada on 12 June 2022.

Olsen-Baker was recalled into the team for the August test series against the Australia for the Laurie O'Reilly Cup.

She was forced to miss the 2021 Women's Rugby World Cup due to a foot injury received during training that prevented from playing rugby for over a year.

She returned to the field in 2023 where she played for the Hurricanes Poua in the Super Rugby Aupiki competition. She then played for Manawatū Cyclones in that year’s Farah Palmer Cup in which the Cyclones beat every team, only to narrowly lose to Northland in the final. In that competition Olsen-Baker made the most carries (113), most defenders beaten (69), and most offloads (26), a performance which resulted in her being nominated for Farah Palmer Cup Player of the Year.

On 17 November 2023, she moved to Matatū for Super Rugby Aupiki's 2024 season. She remained with Matatū for the 2025 season.

=== 2025 Women's Rugby World Cup ===
In July 2025, she was named in the Black Ferns side to the Women's Rugby World Cup in England. In the opening match against Spain on 24 August she received what was a suspected ankle fracture and had to be taken off the field on a stretcher. At the time it appeared that she would be unable to play anymore matches at the tournament but she returned for the quarter-final against South Africa on 13 Septmember, in which she scored two tries, made 26 tackles and completed made seven carries for a total gain of 57 metres. This performance saw her named Player of the Match.

=== 2026 ===
Olsen-Baker enjoyed an outstanding 2026 season, establishing herself as one of the leading players in women's rugby. Playing for Matatū in the 2026 Super Rugby Aupiki competition, she finished as the competition's leading try-scorer with eight tries in seven appearances. She scored in every round-robin match and also led the competition in carries (108) and completed tackles (136).

On 31 October 2026, she was named World Rugby Women's 15s Player of the Year, becoming the fourth Black Fern to win the prestigious award.
