= Arabella McKenzie =

Australia international rugby union & league player

- Born: 1 March 1999 (age 27)
- Height: 1.71 m (5 ft 7 in)
- Weight: 80 kg (12 st 8 lb)

Rugby union career
- Position(s): Fullback, Fly-half, Inside Centre
Super Rugby
Years	Team	Apps	(Points)
2019–21	Waratahs		(0)
2022	Matatū	3	(0)
2023–25	Waratahs		(0)
International career
Years	Team	Apps	(Points)
2019–25	Australia	24	(46)
- Rugby league career

Playing information
- Position: Fullback, Halfback, Centre
Club
Years	Team	Pld	T	G	FG	P
2026–	St. George Illawarra Dragons	0	0	0	0	0
- As of 22 November 2026

Arabella McKenzie (born 1 March 1999) is an Australian rugby league & rugby union player. She has represented Australia at an international level and competed at the delayed 2021 Rugby World Cup in New Zealand.

== Early life ==
McKenzie grew up in Lightning Ridge, New South Wales, a small outback town roughly 700 kilometres (430 mi) northwest of Sydney. She completed her secondary education as a boarder at Frensham, Mittagong. According to ESPN journalist Brittany Mitchell, "McKenzie grew up with the Steeden in her hands as opposed to the Gilbert", referring to the fact that she was "a rugby league fan from a young age who dreamed of playing for the St. George Dragons." She was inspired to switch to union after watching TV coverage of the Australia women's sevens team's gold-medal run at the 2016 Summer Olympics.

== Rugby career ==
=== 2017–19 ===
McKenzie represented Australia at the 2017 Commonwealth Youth Games in Nassau, Bahamas, less than a year after she switched her focus from league to union. Australia won the gold medal final in rugby sevens against Canada.

McKenzie made her debut for the Waratahs in the 2019 Super W season. She then made her international debut for Australia against Japan in 2019.

=== 2021–22 ===
McKenzie was named Super W Player of the Year at the 2021 NSW Waratahs Awards. She contributed to the Waratahs fourth straight Super W Title in 2021, after scoring a total of 15 points in the final against the Queensland Reds. She was named Player of the final.

At the end of 2021, McKenzie signed with Matatū for the inaugural season of Super Rugby Aupiki in 2022.

McKenzie was named in Australia's squad for the 2022 Pacific Four Series in New Zealand. She was once again named in the Wallaroos squad for a two-test series against the Black Ferns at the Laurie O'Reilly Cup. She also made the team for the delayed 2022 Rugby World Cup in New Zealand.

=== 2023 ===
McKenzie made the Wallaroos side for the 2023 Pacific Four Series, and the O'Reilly Cup.

=== 2026 ===
On 28 January 2026 she signed for St. George Illawarra Dragons on a one-year deal

== Personal life ==
McKenzie served as a care worker for What Ability, an Australian disabilities service that uses sportspeople in that role, from 2020 until leaving for New Zealand to play in the inaugural 2022 season of Super Rugby Aupiki. During this time, she worked with a severely autistic man near her age in Sydney, and according to a 2022 ESPN interview, now considers him and his family to be "kind of like my second family down here in Sydney", even having his name of Sammy tattooed on her. In that same interview, she added, "He's just taught me so much about myself. He doesn't know who I am or what's going on and his level of autism is pretty severe, so it's just cool to hang out with him and do fun things like go to the beach hangout, cafes, chill and he's just changed my perspective on life."
