= Siokapesi Palu =

Australian rugby union player (born 1996)

- Born: 15 October 1996 (age 30) Lower Hutt, Wellington, NZ
- Height: 1.74 m (5 ft 9 in)
- Weight: 82 kg (181 lb)

Rugby union career
- Position: Centre
Super Rugby
Years	Team	Apps	(Points)
2020- present	Brumbies	23	(15)
International career
Years	Team	Apps	(Points)
2022 – present	Australia	23	(15)
2022	Australian Barbarians	1	(0)

Siokapesi Palu (born 15 October 1996) is an Australian rugby union player. She plays Centre for the Brumbies in the Super W competition, and has captained the side from 2023 to 2024. She competed for Australia at the 2021 Rugby World Cup.

== Rugby career ==
Palu was selected in the Wallaroos 32-player squad to meet Fiji and Japan in two test matches, but she did not get to run onto the field. She started for the Australian Barbarians side against Japan at Wests Rugby Club in Brisbane on 6 May 2022.

Palu was named in the Australian national team for a two-test series against the Black Ferns for the O'Reilly Cup. She was named in the starting line-up in the second test against New Zealand and made her debut on 27 August 2022 in Adelaide. She was selected in the team again for the delayed 2022 Rugby World Cup in New Zealand.

In 2023, Palu featured in the Wallaroos loss to Canada in the final match of the Pacific Four Series. She later featured in the Wallaroos WVX 2023 squad where she made the shift from the centres to the flanks. Palu was selected to debut the number 6 jersey in the Wallaroos opening match against England.

She made the Wallaroos squad for the 2025 Women's Rugby World Cup in England.
