= Hannah King (rugby union) =

New Zealand rugby union player

- Born: 13 January 2004 (age 22)
- Height: 170 cm (5 ft 7 in)
- Weight: 70 kg (154 lb; 11 st 0 lb)

Rugby union career
- Position: Fly-half
Provincial / State sides
Years	Team	Apps	(Points)
2022–	Canterbury	13	(27)
Super Rugby
Years	Team	Apps	(Points)
2024	Hurricanes Poua	6	(9)
2025-	Matatū	11	(93)
International career
Years	Team	Apps	(Points)
2024	New Zealand	21	(33)

Hannah King (born 13 January 2004) is a New Zealand rugby union player. She plays for Matatū in the Super Rugby Aupiki competition and represents Canterbury at Provincial level.

== Personal life ==
King is studying for a Bachelor of Commerce degree in agriculture at Lincoln University.

== Rugby career ==
King made her debut for Canterbury at 18 and was awarded the most promising Canterbury Farah Palmer Cup player of the year.

In 2024, she moved up north to Wellington for Super Rugby and had a breakout season for Hurricanes Poua. She debuted for the side in their first round clash with Chiefs Manawa.

King received her first Black Ferns contract in April 2024. She was named in the Black Ferns squad for the Pacific Four Series. She came off the bench for her test debut against the United States on 11 May 2024.
