= Tabua Tuinakauvadra =

Australia international rugby union player

- Born: 27 December 2002 (age 23) Sydney
- Height: 6 ft (183 cm)
- Weight: 65 kg (143 lb)
- School: Orange High School

Rugby union career
- Position(s): Flanker, No. 8
2022 ~ 2025	Brumbies		(5)
International career
Years	Team	Apps	(Points)
2023	Australia	22	(20)

Tabua Tuinakauvadra (born 27 December 2002) is an Australian rugby union player. She plays for the Brumbies in the Super W competition.

== Rugby career ==
Tuinakauvadra made her rugby union debut in 2019 for the Emus Rugby Club in Orange, NSW, at the age of 17. She debuted at the inside centre where her Ma'a Nonu styled game established she would be a force to reckon with.

She relocated to Canberra, ACT in 2021 and made her club debut for the Tuggeranong Vikings mid-way through the season. Tuinakauvadra went on to play a key role in their successful 2022 campaign. Vikings claimed 2022 Women's 15s Premiership over a heavily experienced Canberra Royals, narrowingly winning 12–10.

Tuinakauvadra made her Super W debut for the Melbourne Rebels in 2022. She then turned out for the Brumbies for the 2023 Super W season and featured in their first-round match against the Fijiana Drua. She scored her first Super W try in the third round against the Queensland Reds.

Tuinakauvadra came off the bench in her test debut for the Wallaroos against Fiji on 20 May 2023 at the Allianz Stadium.

She was named in the Wallaroos squad for the 2025 Women's Rugby World Cup in England.
