= Sylvia Brunt =

New Zealand rugby union player

- Born: Logo-I-Pulotu Lemapu Atai'i Brunt; 1 January 2004 (age 22) Auckland
- Height: 1.68 m (5 ft 6 in)
- Weight: 84 kg (185 lb)
- School: Mount Albert Grammar School

Rugby union career
- Position: Centre
Amateur team(s)
Years	Team	Apps	(Points)
	Ponsonby		(0)
Provincial / State sides
Years	Team	Apps	(Points)
2020–2023	Auckland Storm	17	(30)
Super Rugby
Years	Team	Apps	(Points)
2021–	Blues Women	25	(40)
International career
Years	Team	Apps	(Points)
2022–	New Zealand	40	(65)
Medal record
Women's rugby union
Representing New Zealand
Rugby World Cup
Gold medal – first place	2021 New Zealand	Team competition
Bronze medal – third place	2025 England	Team competition

Logo-I-Pulotu Lemapu Atai'i "Sylvia" Brunt (born 1 January 2004) is a New Zealand rugby union player. She was part of the Black Ferns squad that won the 2021 Rugby World Cup. She also plays for the Blues Women in the Super Rugby Aupiki competition.

== Rugby career ==
Brunt attended Mount Albert Grammar School in Auckland. She plays for Ponsonby and for the Auckland Storm in the Farah Palmer Cup.

Brunt played for the Blues in the historic clash with the Chiefs Manawa in 2021. She was named in the Blues team for the inaugural season of Super Rugby Aupiki.

Brunt was called in as a travelling reserve for the Black Ferns for the 2022 Pacific Four Series. She made her international debut on 12 June 2022 against Canada in West Auckland. She was recalled into the team for the August Laurie O'Reilly Cup test series against Australia.

Brunt was selected for the Black Ferns 2021 Rugby World Cup 32-player squad. She scored a brace of tries in the second pool game against Wales at the World Cup.

On 17 April 2023, Brunt was given a fulltime Black Ferns contract for the first time as New Zealand Rugby announced the 34-contracted-players for the year. Later in June, she was named in the Black Ferns squad to compete in the Pacific Four Series and O’Reilly Cup. In July 2023, she started in her sides 21–52 victory over Canada at the Pacific Four Series in Ottawa.

In July 2025, she was named in the Black Ferns squad to the Women's Rugby World Cup. She was named Mastercard Player of the Match after her outstanding performance against Ireland, the Black Ferns won 40–0.
