= Kaitlan Leaney =

Australia international rugby union player

- Born: 10 October 2000 (age 26) Coffs Harbour, NSW
- Height: 1.83 m (6 ft 0 in)
- Weight: 88 kg (194 lb)
- School: St John Paul College

Rugby union career
- Position: Lock
Senior career
Years	Team	Apps	(Points)
	Waratahs		(0)
International career
Years	Team	Apps	(Points)
2022–	Australia	35	(0)

Kaitlan Leaney (born 10 October 2000) is an Australian rugby union player. She plays Lock for Australia at an international level, and for the Waratahs in the Super W competition.

== Rugby career ==
Leaney made her international debut for the Wallaroos against Fiji on 6 May 2022 at the Suncorp Stadium in Brisbane. She also played against Japan in a shocking 12–10 loss.

Leaney was named in Australia's squad for the 2022 Pacific Four Series in New Zealand. She was selected again in the Wallaroos squad for a two-test series against the Black Ferns at the Laurie O'Reilly Cup. She made the team again for the delayed 2022 Rugby World Cup in New Zealand.

Leaney was selected in the Wallaroos side for the 2023 Pacific Four Series, and the O'Reilly Cup.

She was named in the Wallaroos squad for the 2025 Women's Rugby World Cup in England.
