= Maia Roos =

New Zealand rugby union player

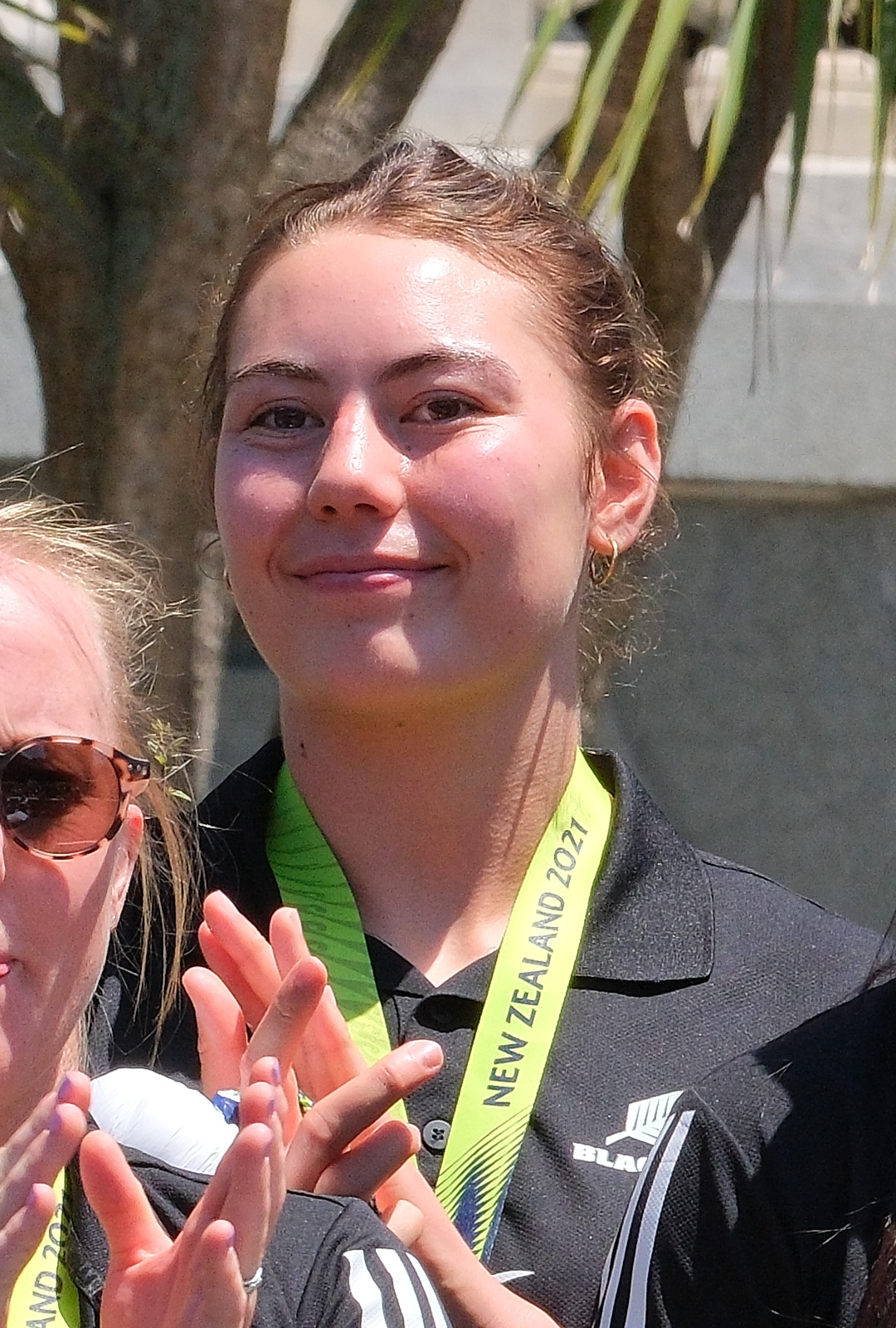
- Roos in 2022
- Full name: Maiakawanakaulani Roos
- Born: 27 July 2001 (age 25) Salt Lake City, Utah, US
- Height: 1.79 m (5 ft 10 in)
- Weight: 80 kg (176 lb)

Rugby union career
- Position: Lock
Provincial / State sides
Years	Team	Apps	(Points)
2019–Present	Auckland	28	(20)
Super Rugby
Years	Team	Apps	(Points)
2021–	Blues Women	30	(15)
International career
Years	Team	Apps	(Points)
2021–	New Zealand	49	(20)
Medal record
Women's rugby union
Representing New Zealand
Rugby World Cup
Gold medal – first place	2021 New Zealand	Team competition
Bronze medal – third place	2025 England	Team competition

Maiakawanakaulani Cerena Turepu Roos (born 27 July 2001) is a New Zealand rugby union player. She plays as a Lock for the Black Ferns internationally and was a member of their 2021 Rugby World Cup champion squad. She also plays for the Blues Women in the Super Rugby Aupiki competition and represents Auckland provincially.

== Rugby career ==
=== 2019–2020 ===
Roos was head girl at Tamaki College. She debuted for the Auckland Storm in 2019 while she was still in school and also played for the New Zealand Barbarians in 2020.

=== 2021 ===
Roos was part of the inaugural Blues women's team that played in the first match against the Chiefs Manawa at Eden Park. She made her test debut for the New Zealand national women's side, the Black Ferns, against England in November.

=== 2022 ===
Roos signed with the Blues for the inaugural Super Rugby Aupiki season in 2022. She was named in the Blues starting line up for their first game against Matatū, they won 21–10. She also started in their 0–35 defeat by the Chiefs Manawa in the final round.

Roos was selected for the Black Ferns squad for the 2022 Pacific Four Series. She scored her first international try against Canada at the Pacific Four Series. She returned to the team for a two-test series against the Wallaroos for the Laurie O'Reilly Cup in August.

Roos made the selection for the Black Ferns squad to the 2021 Rugby World Cup. She scored a try in the second pool game against Wales. She also scored a try in the final pool game against Scotland.

=== 2023–25 ===
In July, she was in the starting line up in her sides 21–52 victory over Canada at the Pacific Four Series in Ottawa. Roos captained the Black Ferns for their final Pacific Four match against the United States. She became the youngest-ever to captain the team, breaking the record that was previously held by Farah Palmer by three years.

In July 2025, she was named in the Black Ferns side to the Women's Rugby World Cup in England.
