= Brianna Hoy =

Australia international rugby union player

- Born: 7 July 2000 (age 26) Coffs Harbour, NSW, Australia
- Height: 171 cm (5 ft 7 in)
- Weight: 88 kg (194 lb; 13 st 12 lb)

Rugby union career
- Position: Prop
Senior career
Years	Team	Apps	(Points)
2023	Mie Pearls		
Super Rugby
Years	Team	Apps	(Points)
2021–	NSW Waratahs		
International career
Years	Team	Apps	(Points)
2023–	Australia	9	(0)

Brianna Hoy (born 7 July 2000) is an Australian rugby union player who plays in the Prop position. She competed for Australia at the 2025 Women's Rugby World Cup.

== Rugby career ==
In 2021, she debuted for the Waratahs when they won their fourth Super W championship after defeating the Reds in the final.

Hoy started in her international debut for Australia against England at the inaugural 2023 WXV 1 tournament that was held in New Zealand.

She sustained an ACL injury during training in the Wallaroos 2024 WXV 2 campaign and was sidelined for 10 months.

In 2025, she was selected in the Wallaroos side for the Women's Rugby World Cup in England.
