= Asoiva Karpani =

Australian rugby union & league footballer (b. 1996)

Personal information
- Born: 18 June 1996 (age 30) Queensland, Australia
- Height: 1.76 m (5 ft 9 in)
- Weight: 95 kg (14 st 13 lb)

Playing information

Rugby league
- Position: Prop
Club
Years	Team	Pld	T	G	FG	P
2018	St George Illawarra	1	0	0	0	0

Rugby union
- Position: Prop
Club
Years	Team	Pld	T	G	FG	P
2019–20	NSW Waratahs	8	0	0	0	0
	Queensland Reds	0	0	0	0	0
	Total	8	0	0	0	0
Representative
Years	Team	Pld	T	G	FG	P
2019	Australia	41	14	0	0	70
- Source: RLP As of 20 October 2020
- Relatives: Simone Karpani (sister)

Asoiva "Eva" Karpani (born 18 June 1996) is an Australian rugby union footballer who plays for the Queensland Reds in the Super W. She is an Australian Wallaroos representative and competed at the 2021 Rugby World Cup. She previously played for the NSW Waratahs as well as the St George Illawarra Dragons in the NRL Women's Premiership.

== Personal life ==
Karpani was born in Queensland and raised in Adelaide, South Australia. She is the sister of Newcastle Knights NRLW player Simone Karpani.

== Rugby union career ==
Karpani played for Onkaparinga and Brighton before representing the Australian Youth rugby sevens team at the 2013 Australian Youth Olympic Festival.

In 2017, she played for the University of Adelaide at the Aon University Sevens. In 2018, she moved to Sydney and joined the NSW Waratahs Super W team for 2019 season.

On July 13, 2019, she made her Test debut for Australia against Japan.

Karpani was named in Australia's squad for the 2022 Pacific Four Series in New Zealand. She was named in the Wallaroos squad for a two-test series against the Black Ferns at the Laurie O'Reilly Cup. She was selected in the team again for the delayed 2022 Rugby World Cup in New Zealand.

Karpani made the Wallaroos side for the 2023 Pacific Four Series, and the O'Reilly Cup.

She was named in the Wallaroos squad for the 2025 Women's Rugby World Cup in England.

== Rugby league career ==
On 31 July 2018, Karpani signed with the St George Illawarra Dragons NRL Women's Premiership team. Prior to signing with the Dragons, she represented South Australia and the Combined Affiliated States.

In Round 1 of the 2018 NRL Women's season, she made her debut for the Dragons in their 4–30 loss to the Brisbane Broncos.

In 2019, she played for the South Sydney Rabbitohs in the NSWRL Women's Premiership.
