= Liana Mikaele-Tu'u =

New Zealand rugby union player (born 2002)

- Born: 2 March 2002 (age 24) Hastings, New Zealand
- Height: 1.77 m (5 ft 10 in)
- Weight: 93 kg (14 st 9 lb; 205 lb)
- School: Hastings Girls' High School
- Notable relative: Marino Mikaele-Tu'u (brother)

Rugby union career
- Position(s): Loose forward, number 8
Senior career
Years	Team	Apps	(Points)
2019	Hawke's Bay	6	(10)
2020–2023	Auckland	16	(15)
2025–	Harlequins		(5)
- Correct as of 17 November 2025
Super Rugby
Years	Team	Apps	(Points)
2021–	Blues Women	30	(30)
International career
Years	Team	Apps	(Points)
2021–	New Zealand	46	(40)
- Correct as of 27 September 2025
Medal record
Women's rugby union
Representing New Zealand
Rugby World Cup
Gold medal – first place	2021 New Zealand	Team competition
Bronze medal – third place	2025 England	Team competition

Liana Mikaele-Tu'u (born 2 March 2002) is a New Zealand rugby union player. She plays for the Black Ferns internationally and was a member of their 2021 Rugby World Cup champion squad. She also plays for Blues Women in the Super Rugby Aupiki competition. She played for Hawke's Bay previously before moving to Auckland. In October 2025, she joined Harlequins as injury cover.

== Rugby career ==
Mikaele-Tu’u attended Hastings Girls High School and debuted for Hawke's Bay in the Farah Palmer Cup in 2019. She moved to Auckland in 2020 to study physiotherapy at university and currently plays for Auckland.

=== 2021 ===
Mikaele-Tu'u played for the Blues against the Chiefs in the first-ever women's Super Rugby match in New Zealand on 1 May 2021.

Mikaele-Tu'u made her Black Ferns test debut against England in Exeter on 31 October. On 3 November, She was named in the Blues squad for the inaugural Super Rugby Aupiki competition.

=== 2022 ===
Mikaele-Tu'u was named in the Blues starting line up for their first game against Matatū, they won 21–10. She also started in their 0–35 thrashing by the Chiefs Manawa in the final round.

Mikaele-Tu’u was named in the Black Ferns squad for the 2022 Pacific Four Series. She made the team once again for the deferred 2021 Rugby World Cup that was hosted by New Zealand. She scored a try for the Black Ferns as they thrashed Scotland 57–0 in their final pool game.

=== 2023–25 ===
In July 2023, she made the starting line up in the Black Ferns 21–52 victory over Canada at the Pacific Four Series in Ottawa.

In July 2025, she was named in the Black Ferns Rugby World Cup squad.

In October 2025, she joined Premiership Women's Rugby team Harlequins as injury cover.

== Personal life ==
Her brother, loose forward Marino Mikaele-Tu'u, has played for the All Blacks XV and Highlanders.
