= Mererangi Paul =

NZ international rugby union player

- Born: 29 October 1998 (age 28)
- Height: 1.71 m (5 ft 7 in)
- Notable relative: Mahina Paul (sister)

Rugby union career
- Position: Wing
Provincial / State sides
| Years | Team | Apps | (Points) |
| 2020–2021 | Bay of Plenty | 10 | (17) |
| 2022–2025 | Counties Manukau | 14 | (46) |
Super Rugby
| Years | Team | Apps | (Points) |
| 2023–2025 | Chiefs Manawa | 18 | (40) |
| 2026– | Blues Women | 7 | (15) |
International career
| Years | Team | Apps | (Points) |
| 2023– | New Zealand | 24 | (115) |
Medal record
Women's rugby union
Representing New Zealand
World Cup
| Bronze medal – third place | 2025 England | Team competition |

Mererangi Paul (born 29 October 1998) is a New Zealand rugby union player. She plays for Chiefs Manawa in the Super Rugby Aupiki competition and for Counties Manukau in the Farah Palmer Cup.

== Early career ==
=== Netball & Touch rugby ===
Paul played for the Northern Mystics in the ANZ Premiership, she debuted for them in the 2017 ANZ Premiership season. She also competed for the New Zealand Women's Open squad for the 2019 Touch Football World Cup in Malaysia.

=== Rugby sevens ===
Paul played her first sevens game for Rotoiti three weeks prior to Auckland's Red Bull Ignite7 competition in 2018. She was named as one of the top three women during the tournament and earned a spot at the Black Ferns Sevens National Development Camp for 2019.

Paul also competed for the Surge Women's team in the 2020 Red Bull Ignite7's tournament in December. She played Fly-half for Counties Manukau in the Farah Palmer Cup and has also represented Bay of Plenty in sevens.

== Rugby career ==
Paul joined Chiefs Manawa in 2022 as part of their wider training squad before making her first start for the side during the 2023 Super Rugby Aupiki season. She started on the wing in her debut for the Chiefs against Hurricanes Poua in the opening match of the season. She later scored a hat-trick in her side's win over the Blues in round two of the competition. In the third and final round, an error from Matatū helped Paul score her team's first points. She scored in the Chiefs semi-final win against Hurricanes Poua, and also featured in their loss to Matatū in the final.

Paul was one of 34-players who received Black Ferns contracts on 17 April 2023. In June, she was named in the Black Ferns 30-player squad to compete in the Pacific Four Series and O’Reilly Cup. She scored two tries on her debut against Australia on 29 June 2023 at Brisbane. At the Pacific Four Series in July, she scored two tries in her sides 21–52 victory over Canada in Ottawa.

On 16 September 2025, she was called into the Black Ferns World Cup squad as an injury replacement for Amy du Plessis.
