= Maya Stewart =

Australia international rugby union player

- Born: 14 March 2000 (age 26) Waratah, NSW
- Height: 1.69 m (5 ft 7 in)
- Weight: 73 kg (161 lb)
- School: San Clemente High School, St Francis Xavier's College

Rugby union career
- Position(s): Wing, Fullback
Super Rugby
Years	Team	Apps	(Points)
	NSW Waratahs	12	(95)
International career
Years	Team	Apps	(Points)
2022–Present	Australia	22	(80)

Maya Stewart (born 14 March 2000) is an Australian rugby union player. She plays for the Wallaroos internationally and for the NSW Waratahs in the Super W competition. She represented Australia at the delayed 2021 Rugby World Cup in New Zealand.

== Early career ==
Stewart played several sports as a teen, including league and touch. She began her rugby career with The Waratahs, before moving to the Hunter Wildfires and then eventually making her way to the NSW Waratahs in the Super W competition.

== Rugby career ==
In 2021, Stewart scored four tries against the Queensland Reds in the opening game of the Super W season. Her year was shortened after she sustained an ACL injury for the second time.

Stewart suffered another ACL injury in a pre-season training ahead of the 2022 Super W campaign and was ruled out for the season. After her recovery, she was named in the Wallaroos squad to face the Black Ferns for the 2022 Laurie O'Reilly Cup, although she did not get to play in any matches.

Despite her setbacks, Stewart was impressive during the Wallaroos camp and made the squad for the Rugby World Cup in New Zealand.

Stewart started 2023 with a brace of tries, she scored a hat-trick against the United States during their Pacific Four Series clash. She helped her side win against Fiji on 20 May at the Allianz Stadium. In 2024, She scored in her sixth straight Test, and broke Tricia Brown’s all-time record of 13 career tries.

She was crowned Wallaroos Player of the Year at the Rugby Australia Awards in October 2024.

In 2025, she was named in the Wallaroos side for the Women's Rugby World Cup in England.
