= Western Force Women =

- Union: Rugby Australia (Western Australia)
- Founded: 2017; 9 years ago
- Location: Perth, Western Australia
- Region: Western Australia, Australia
- Coach: Dylan Parsons
- Captain: Trilleen Pomare
- League: Super Rugby Women's
- 2025: 4th
| 1st kit | 2nd kit |

Official website
- westernforce.rugby

The Western Force Women are an Australian rugby union team that competes annually in the Super W competition, and are based in Perth, Western Australia. They have competed in every edition of Super W since its official launch in 2018. They played under the name RugbyWA from 2019 to 2020.

== History ==
The team played as the Western Force Women in the inaugural season of the Super W competition, finishing third overall. They played under the name RugbyWA during the 2019 and 2020 seasons after their re-branding. The side returned to their "roots" by wearing the traditional black and gold state colours.

They returned to playing under the Western Force name in 2021 as a newly structured Super W team, in an effort to increases support for the women's game in Western Australia. With RugbyWA administering the "operational and logistical aspects in a collaborative approach". The Western Force did not complete the 2021 season but opted to pull out of the Super W competition after the first round due to the worsening COVID-19 situation in New South Wales.

== Current squad ==
On 29 January 2025, the squad for the 2025 Super Rugby Women's season was announced.

Western Force Women Super W squad
| **Props**: Zoe Elliott; **Alapeta Ngauamo**; Hannah Palelei; **Allana Sikimeti**; Megumi Takagi; Braxton Walker; **Hookers**: Loretta Mailangi; **Hera-Barb Malcolm Heke**; **Ashley Marsters**; **Locks**: Rosie Ebbage; **Michaela Leonard**; **Sera Naiqama**; Libya Teepa | **Loose Forwards**: Nami Dickson; Tamika Jones; Anneka Stephens; **Pia Tapsell**; Taylor Waterson; **Scrum-halves**: **Georgia Cormick**; **Samantha Wood**; **Mio Yamanaka**; **Fly-halves**: Grace Freeman; Nicole Ledington; **Trilleen Pomare** (c) | **Centres**: Ngamihi Monk; **Cecilia Smith**; **Outside Backs**: Adi Vani Buleki; Halley Derera; Haylee Hifo; Sheree Hume; Brooklyn Teki-Joyce; **Samantha Treherne** |
(c) Denotes team captain, **Bold** denotes internationally capped, ^{ST} indicated short-term cover and ^{TS} indicates a training squad player.

== Season standings ==
Super Rugby Women's

| Year | Pos | Pld | W | D | L | F | A | +/- | BP | Pts | Play-offs |
|---|---|---|---|---|---|---|---|---|---|---|---|
| 2025 | 4th | 4 | 1 | 1 | 2 | 107 | 133 | –26 | 1 | 7 | Lost to NSW Waratahs in semi-final |
| 2024 | 3rd | 5 | 3 | 0 | 2 | 124 | 126 | –2 | 1 | 13 | Lost to Fijian Drua in playoff |
| 2023 | 5th | 5 | 2 | 0 | 3 | 77 | 132 | –55 | 0 | 8 | Did not compete |
| 2022 | 6th | 4 | 0 | 0 | 4 | 57 | 146 | –89 | 0 | 0 | Did not compete |
| 2021 | Withdrew from competition due to COVID-19 pandemic | | | | | | | | | | Did not compete |
| 2020 | 5th | 4 | 0 | 0 | 4 | 41 | 184 | –143 | 2 | 2 | Did not compete |
| 2019 | 4th | 4 | 1 | 0 | 3 | 53 | 86 | –33 | 1 | 6 | Did not compete |
| 2018 | 3rd | 4 | 2 | 0 | 2 | 154 | 87 | +67 | 2 | 10 | Did not compete |

== Coaching staff ==
- Head Coach: Dylan Parsons
- Assistant Coach: Chris Heiberg
- Assistant Coach: Dwayne Grace
- Female High Performance Pathways Manager: Claudia Bell
