= Piper Duck =

Australia international rugby union player

- Born: 2 April 2001 (age 25) Wagga Wagga, New South Wales
- Height: 1.73 m (5 ft 8 in)
- Weight: 89 kg (196 lb)
- School: McAuley Catholic Central School, Barker College

Rugby union career
- Position: Flanker
Super Rugby
Years	Team	Apps	(Points)
2020 – present	Waratahs		(0)
International career
Years	Team	Apps	(Points)
2022–	Australia	22	(5)

Piper Duck (born 2 April 2001) is an Australian rugby union player. She plays at Flanker for the New South Wales Waratahs in the Super W competition and for Australia at an international level. She competed at the 2022 and 2025 Women's Rugby World Cups.

== Rugby career ==
Duck was selected for the Wallaroos A team and the Australian Youth Girls 7s team in 2019. She plays for Waratahs in the Super W competition and made her debut in the 2020 season against the Melbourne Rebels.

On 6 May 2022, she made her international debut for the Wallaroos against Fiji. She also featured in their 10–12 loss to Japan. She was named in Australia's squad for the 2022 Pacific Four Series in New Zealand.

Duck was called into the Wallaroos squad for a two-test series against the Black Ferns at the Laurie O'Reilly Cup. She was later selected in the team again for the delayed 2022 Rugby World Cup in New Zealand.

In 2023, she became the youngest Wallaroos captain when she took over the role from Shannon Parry. She is expected to begin her captaincy against the Black Ferns in Redcliffe on 29 June 2023.

She was named in the Wallaroos squad for the 2025 Women's Rugby World Cup in England.
