= 2026 Super Rugby Aupiki season =

Women's rugby union competition in New Zealand

- Countries: New Zealand
- Tournament format(s): Round-robin and Final
- Champions: Blues Women (3rd title)
- Matches played: 13
- Tries scored: 119 (9.15 per match)
- Top point scorer(s): Renee Holmes, Hurricanes Poua (71)
- Top try scorer(s): Kaipo Olsen-Baker, Matatū (8)
- Official website: superrugby.co.nz/aupiki

The 2026 Super Rugby Aupiki season is the fifth season of Super Rugby Aupiki, the top-flight women's rugby union competition organised by New Zealand Rugby between four teams from New Zealand. The regular season begins on 13 June 2026, when Blues Women and Hurricanes Poua play the opening match in Auckland. The Grand Final will be played on 25 July 2026. The defending champions are Blues Women, who won their second title in 2025.

As in 2025, the Super Rugby Aupiki champions will play the champions of Australia's Super Rugby competition, Super Rugby Women's, at the end of the season. The 2026 Women's Super Rugby Champions final will be played on 1 August 2026 in Sydney.

New this year is the introduction of the "All In" Round, which – similar to Super Round in Super Rugby Pacific – will see all four teams play a double header at Navigation Homes Stadium, Pukekohe in round 3.

== Teams, personnel and locations ==
Home locations of all the 2026 Super Rugby Aupiki teams

Union	Team	Coach	Captain	Stadia information	
Union	Team	Coach	Captain	Stadia	Capacity
New Zealand	Blues Women	Willie Walker	Maia Roos	Eden Park, Auckland	50,000
New Zealand	Blues Women	Willie Walker	Maia Roos	Semenoff Stadium, Whangārei	18,500
New Zealand	Chiefs Manawa	Dwayne Sweeney	Kennedy Tukuafu	Fred Jones Park, Hamilton	—
New Zealand	Hurricanes Poua	Hayden Triggs	Te Rauoriwa Gapper; Samantha Taylor	Maidstone Park, Upper Hutt	8,000
New Zealand	Matatū	Blair Baxter	Grace Brooker	One NZ Stadium, Christchurch	25,000
New Zealand	Matatū	Blair Baxter	Grace Brooker	Fraser Park, Timaru	12,500
New Zealand	Matatū	Blair Baxter	Grace Brooker	Ngā Puna Wai, Christchurch	1,000
New Zealand	all teams (All In Round)	—	—	Navigation Homes Stadium, Pukekohe	12,000

== Standings ==
2026 Super Rugby Aupiki standings
Pos	Team	Pld	W	D	L	PF	PA	PD	TF	TA	TB	LB	Pts	Qualification
1	Matatū (RU)	6	4	0	2	198	157	+41	30	24	2	1	19	Super Rugby Aupiki Grand Final
2	Blues Women (C)	6	4	0	2	200	160	+40	32	22	1	1	18	Super Rugby Aupiki Grand Final
3	Hurricanes Poua	6	4	0	2	181	183	−2	24	29	0	1	17	
4	Chiefs Manawa	6	0	0	6	164	243	−79	26	37	0	2	2	

Source: Super Rugby Aupiki - Team standings
Competition points breakdown: 4 points for a win; 2 points for a draw; 1 bonus point for a loss by seven points or less; and 1 bonus point for scoring at least three tries more than the opponent in a match.
(C) Champions; (RU) Runners-up;

== Matches ==
The draw for the fifth season of Super Rugby Aupiki was announced on 18 February 2026. The competition starts on 13 June 2026, when Blues Women host Hurricanes Poua in Auckland. The Grand Final will take place on Saturday 25 July 2026.

=== Round 1 ===
13 June 2026
14:05 NZST (UTC+12)

Blues Women	42–7	Hurricanes Poua
Try: Braxton Sorensen-McGee 5'; Mererangi Paul 13'; Sylvia Brunt 27'; Atlanta Lolohea 30'; Liana Mikaele-Tu'u 68'; Tafito Lafaele 78'; Con: Braxton Sorensen-McGee (6/6) 6', 14', 28', 31', 69', 79'; Cards: Ma'ama Mo'onia Vaipulu (red card) 38'	Report	Try: Samantha Taylor 17'; Con: Renee Holmes (1/1) 18'; Cards: Krystal Murray (yellow card) 26'

Eden Park, Auckland
Referee: Erin Doherty

13 June 2026
16:05 NZST (UTC+12)

Matatū	52–26	Chiefs Manawa
Try: Kaipo Olsen-Baker 5'; Maia Joseph 11'; Elinor Plum-King (3) 21', 70', 73'; Amy du Plessis 24'; Lialanie Muamua 42'; Laura Bayfield 57'; Con: Hannah King (6/8) 6', 22', 25', 43', 71', 74'	Report	Try: Vici-Rose Green (2) 14', 32'; Leata Puni Lio 52'; Ariana Bayler 62'; Con: Carys Dallinger (3/3) 15', 33', 53'; Madison Flutey (0/1)

One NZ Stadium, Christchurch
Attendance: 11,793
Referee: Maggie Cogger-Orr

=== Round 2 ===
20 June 2026
14:05 NZST (UTC+12)

Chiefs Manawa	26–27	Blues Women
Try: Lonita Ngalu 7'; Carys Dallinger 25'; Shyrah Tuliau-Tua'a 32'; Vici-Rose Green 60'; Con: Carys Dallinger (3/3) 8', 26', 33'; Madison Flutey (0/1); Cards: Justine McGregor (yellow card) 65'	Report	Try: Mererangi Paul 12'; Tara Turner 36'; Aldora Itunu 40+2'; Katelyn Vaha'akolo 51'; Jaymie Kolose 66'; Con: Braxton Sorensen-McGee (1/4) 13'; Ruahei Demant (0/1); Cards: Taufa Bason (yellow card) 59'

FMG Stadium Waikato, Hamilton
Referee: Warwick Lahmert

21 June 2026
14:05 NZST (UTC+12)

Hurricanes Poua	15–18	Matatū
Try: Iritana Hohaia 46'; Angel Mulu 77'; Con: Renee Holmes (1/2) 47'; Pen: Renee Holmes (1/1) 68'; Cards: Anahera Hamahona (yellow card) 19'; Ngano Tavake (yellow card) 21'	Report	Try: Lialanie Muamua 21'; Kaipo Olsen-Baker 33'; Con: Hannah King (1/2) 22'; Pen: Hannah King (2/2) 65', 72'; Cards: Phillipa Love (yellow card) 45'

Maidstone Park, Upper Hutt
Referee: Maggie Cogger-Orr

=== Round 3 – All In Round ===
27 June 2026
17:05 NZST (UTC+12)

Chiefs Manawa	29–34	Hurricanes Poua
Try: Kennedy Tukuafu 9'; Holli O'Sullivan 24'; Manaia Nuku 58'; Tynealle Fitzgerald 72'; Chyna Hohepa 79'; Con: Ariana Bayler (1/3) 10'; Madison Flutey (1/2) 25'	Report	Try: Hinemaringi Scott 37'; Angel Mulu 40+2'; Tegan Hollows 50'; Renee Holmes 66'; Con: Renee Holmes (4/4) 38', 40+3', 51', 67'; Pen: Renee Holmes (2/2) 15', 55'; Cards: Ngano Tavake (red card) 33'

Navigation Homes Stadium, Pukekohe
Referee: Marcus Playle

27 June 2026
19:05 NZST (UTC+12)

Blues Women	21–27	Matatū
Try: Liana Mikaele-Tu'u 26'; Jaymie Kolose 54'; Atlanta Lolohea 64'; Con: Braxton Sorensen-McGee (3/3) 27', 55', 65'; Cards: Maia Roos (yellow card) 8'	Report	Try: Kaipo Olsen-Baker 9'; Winnie Palamo 20'; Hannah King 69'; Con: Hannah King (3/3) 10', 21', 70'; Pen: Hannah King (2/2) 14', 61'

Navigation Homes Stadium, Pukekohe
Referee: Todd Petrie

=== Round 4 ===
4 July 2026
14:35 NZST (UTC+12)

Hurricanes Poua	45–30	Blues Women
Try: Wikitoria Viljoen (3) 7', 38', 52'; Arene Landon-Lane 61'; Iritana Hohaia 67'; Con: Renee Holmes (4/5) 8', 39', 62', 68'; Pen: Renee Holmes (4/4) 15', 30', 40+3', 73'	Report	Try: Katelyn Vaha'akolo 12', 32'; Mererangi Paul 23'; Jaymie Kolose 43'; Liana Mikaele-Tu'u 47'; Hollyrae Mete 79'; Con: Braxton Sorensen-McGee (0/6)

Maidstone Park, Upper Hutt
Attendance: Warwick Lahmert

4 July 2026
15:05 NZST (UTC+12)

Chiefs Manawa	24–41	Matatū
Try: Mia Anderson 17'; Ariana Bayler 45'; Shyrah Tuliau-Tua'a 48'; Louise Blyde 54'; Con: Madison Flutey (1/2) 46'; Ariana Bayler (1/2) 49'	Report	Try: Phillipa Love 3'; Kaipo Olsen-Baker (2) 6', 71'; Fiaali'i Solomona 22'; Grace Brooker 27'; Amy du Plessis 34'; Natalie Delamere 62'; Con: Hannah King (2/4) 4', 35'; Maia Joseph (1/1) 22'; Poppy Baxter (0/2); Cards: Santo Taumata (yellow card) 52' (yellow-red card) 67'

Navigation Homes Stadium, Pukekohe
Referee: Maggie Cogger-Orr

=== Round 5 ===
10 July 2026
16:35 NZST (UTC+12)

Blues Women	42–26	Chiefs Manawa
Try: Ma'ama Mo'onia Vaipulu 6'; Tara Turner 10'; Danny-Elle Alefosio Fesolai 16'; Sylvia Brunt 33'; Hollyrae Mete 47'; Amarante Sititi 62'; Con: Ruahei Demant (6/6) 6', 11', 17', 34', 47', 63'	Report	Try: Mia Anderson (2) 29', 40'; Shyrah Tuliau-Tua'a (2) 55', 80'; Con: Carys Dallinger (2/2) 30', 40+1'; Ariana Bayler (1/2) 56'; Cards: Veisinia Mahutariki-Fakalelu (yellow card) 8'; Shyrah Tuliau-Tua'a (yellow card) 61'

Semenoff Stadium, Whangārei
Referee: Todd Petrie

11 July 2026
14:05 NZST (UTC+12)

Matatū	31–33	Hurricanes Poua
Try: Alena Saili 11'; Phillipa Love 18'; Kaipo Olsen-Baker 22'; Grace Brooker 52'; Maia Davis 72'; Con: Maia Joseph (3/5) 19', 23', 53'	Report	Try: Renee Holmes 26'; Neve Anglesey 31'; Arene Landon-Lane 49'; Iritana Hohaia 69'; Angel Mulu 80+3'; Con: Renee Holmes (4/5) 32', 50', 70', 80+4'; Cards: Fia Laikong (yellow card) 53'

Fraser Park, Timaru
Referee: Erin Doherty
Warwick Lahmert

=== Round 6 ===
18 July 2026
12:20 NZST (UTC+12)

Hurricanes Poua	47–33	Chiefs Manawa
Try: Neve Anglesey 3'; Hinemaringi Scott 15'; Ayesha Leti-I'iga (2) 25', 30'; Wikitoria Viljoen (2) 37', 45'; Iritana Hohaia 40+1'; Con: Renee Holmes (6/7) 4', 15', 26', 31', 38', 40+2'; Wikitoria Viljoen (0/1)	Report	Try: Olivia Holten 8'; Shyrah Tuliau-Tua'a 17'; Leomie Kloppers 22'; Jade Coates 49'; Holli O'Sullivan 56'; Con: Ariana Bayler (4/5) 9', 23', 50', 57'; Cards: Vici-Rose Green (yellow card) 33'; Nicole Purdom (yellow card) 73'

Maidstone Park, Upper Hutt
Referee: Ben Woolerton

18 July 2026
14:35 NZST (UTC+12)

Matatū	29–38	Blues
Try: Kaipo Olsen-Baker (2) 7', 35'; Maia Davis 20'; Charntay Poko 52'; Lialanie Muamua 71'; Con: Maia Davis (2/5) 8', 36'	Report	Try: Ruahei Demant 11'; Jaymie Kolose 23'; Taufa Bason 39'; Braxton Sorensen-McGee (2) 45', 75'; Katelyn Vaha'akolo 66'; Con: Braxton Sorensen-McGee (4/6) 12', 24', 40', 67'

Ngā Puna Wai, Christchurch
Referee: Marcus Playle

== Grand Final ==
25 July 2026
16:20 NZST (UTC+12)

Matatū	21–28	Blues Women
Try: Sarah Jones 27'; Alena Saili 33'; Georgia Ponsonby 77'; Con: Maia Joseph (3/3) 28', 34', 79'	Report	Try: Atlanta Lolohea (2) 16', 70'; Katelyn Vaha'akolo (2) 44', 80+2'; Con: Braxton Sorensen-McGee (1/1) 16'; Ruahei Demant (3/3) 45', 71', 80+4'

One NZ Stadium, Christchurch
Attendance: 10,067
Referee: Maggie Cogger-Orr

LP	1	(New Zealand) Maddi Robinson		(substituted off) 76'
HK	2	(New Zealand) Natalie Delamere		(substituted off) 48'
TP	3	(New Zealand) Santo Taumata		(substituted off) 48'
LL	4	(New Zealand) Laura Bayfield
RL	5	(New Zealand) Emma Dermody		(substituted off) 56'
BF	6	(New Zealand) Sarah Jones		(substituted off) 76'
OF	7	(New Zealand) Elinor-Plum King
N8	8	(New Zealand) Kaipo Olsen-Baker
SH	9	(New Zealand) Maia Joseph	(yellow card) 38'
FH	10	(New Zealand) Charntay Poko		(substituted off) 56'
LW	11	(New Zealand) Alena Saili
IC	12	(New Zealand) Grace Brooker (c)
OC	13	(New Zealand) Amy du Plessis
RW	14	(New Zealand) Winnie Palamo
FB	15	(New Zealand) Maia Davis
Replacements:
HK	16	(New Zealand) Georgia Ponsonby		(substituted on) 48'
PR	17	(New Zealand) Phillipa Love		(substituted on) 48'
PR	18	(New Zealand) Wikitoria Rogers		(substituted on) 76'
LF	19	(New Zealand) Paris Lokotui		(substituted on) 56'
LF	20	(New Zealand) Lucy Jenkins		(substituted on) 76'
HK	21	(New Zealand) Holly Greenway
SH	22	(New Zealand) Kelsyn McCook
WG	23	(New Zealand) Lialanie Muamua		(substituted on) 56'
Coach:
(New Zealand) Blair Baxter

LP	1	(New Zealand) Chryss Viliko		(substituted off) 77'
HK	2	(New Zealand) Atlanta Lolohea
TP	3	(New Zealand) Aldora Itunu		(substituted off) 28'	(substituted on) 39'	(substituted off) 52'
LL	4	(New Zealand) Maia Roos (c)
RL	5	(New Zealand) Ma'ama Mo'onia Vaipulu	(yellow card) 76'
BF	6	(New Zealand) Amarante Sititi
OF	7	(New Zealand) Danny-Elle Alefosio Fesolai		(substituted off) 41'
N8	8	(New Zealand) Liana Mikaele-Tu'u
SH	9	(New Zealand) Tara Turner
FH	10	(New Zealand) Ruahei Demant
LW	11	(New Zealand) Jaymie Kolose
IC	12	(New Zealand) Hollyrae Mete
OC	13	(New Zealand) Sylvia Brunt
RW	14	(New Zealand) Mererangi Paul
FB	15	(New Zealand) Braxton Sorensen-McGee		(substituted off) 23'
Replacements:
HK	16	(New Zealand) Grace Gago
PR	17	(Japan) Nijiho Nagata		(substituted on) 77'
PR	18	(New Zealand) Harono Te Iringa		(substituted on) 28'	(substituted off) 39'	(substituted on) 52'
LK	19	(New Zealand) Eloise Blackwell
LF	20	(New Zealand) Taufa Bason		(substituted on) 41'
LF	21	(New Zealand) Tafito Lafaele
FH	22	(New Zealand) Hazel Tubic
WG	23	(New Zealand) Katelyn Vaha'akolo		(substituted on) 23'
Coach:
(New Zealand) Willie Walker

== Statistics ==
As of 25 July 2026.

=== Leading point scorers ===
No.	Player	Team	Points	Average	Details
1	Renee Holmes	Hurricanes Poua	71	11.83	2 T, 20 C, 7 P, 0 D
2	Braxton Sorensen-McGee	Blues Women	45	6.43	3 T, 15 C, 0 P, 0 D
3	Hannah King	Matatū	41	10.25	1 T, 12 C, 4 P, 0 D
4	Kaipo Olsen-Baker	Matatū	40	5.71	8 T, 0 C, 0 P, 0 D
5	Katelyn Vaha'akolo	Blues Women	30	5.00	6 T, 0 C, 0 P, 0 D
6	Shyrah Tuliau-Tua'a	Chiefs Manawa	25	4.17	5 T, 0 C, 0 P, 0 D
6	Wikitoria Viljoen	Hurricanes Poua	25	5.00	5 T, 0 C, 0 P, 0 D
8	Ariana Bayler	Chiefs Manawa	24	4.00	2 T, 7 C, 0 P, 0 D
9	Ruahei Demant	Blues Women	23	3.29	1 T, 9 C, 0 P, 0 D
10	Carys Dallinger	Chiefs Manawa	21	10.50	1 T, 8 C, 0 P, 0 D

=== Leading try scorers ===
No.	Player	Team	Tries	Average
1	Kaipo Olsen-Baker	Matatū	8	1.14
2	Katelyn Vaha'akolo	Blues Women	6	1.00
3	Shyrah Tuliau-Tua'a	Chiefs Manawa	5	0.83
3	Wikitoria Viljoen	Hurricanes Poua	5	1.00
5	Iritana Hohaia	Hurricanes Poua	4	0.67
5	Jaymie Kolose	Blues Women	4	0.67
5	Atlanta Lolohea	Blues Women	4	0.57
8	Mia Anderson	Chiefs Manawa	3	0.60
8	Vici-Rose Green	Chiefs Manawa	3	0.50
8	Elinor-Plum King	Matatū	3	0.43
8	Liana Mikaele-Tu'u	Blues Women	3	0.43
8	Lialanie Muamua	Matatū	3	0.43
8	Angel Mulu	Hurricanes Poua	3	0.60
8	Mererangi Paul	Blues Women	3	0.43
8	Braxton Sorensen-McGee	Blues Women	3	0.43

=== Discipline ===
Player	Team	Red	Yellow	Round (vs. opponent)
Santo Taumata	Matatū	1	1	Round 4 (vs. Chiefs Manawa); Round 4 (vs. Chiefs Manawa)
Ngano Tavake	Hurricanes Poua	1	1	Round 3 (vs. Chiefs Manawa); Round 2 (vs. Matatū)
Ma'ama Mo'onia Vaipulu	Blues Women	1	1	Round 1 (vs. Hurricanes Poua); Final (vs. Matatū)
Taufa Bason	Blues Women	0	1	Round 2 (vs. Chiefs Manawa)
Vici-Rose Green	Chiefs Manawa	0	1	Round 6 (vs. Hurricanes Poua)
Anahera Hamahona	Hurricanes Poua	0	1	Round 2 (vs. Matatū)
Maia Joseph	Matatū	0	1	Final (vs. Blues Women)
Fia Laikong	Hurricanes Poua	0	1	Round 5 (vs. Matatū)
Phillipa Love	Matatū	0	1	Round 2 (vs. Hurricanes Poua)
Veisinia Mahutariki-Fakalelu	Chiefs Manawa	0	1	Round 5 (vs. Blues Women)
Justine McGregor	Chiefs Manawa	0	1	Round 2 (vs. Blues Women)
Krystal Murray	Hurricanes Poua	0	1	Round 1 (vs. Blues Women)
Nicole Purdom	Chiefs Manawa	0	1	Round 6 (vs. Hurricanes Poua)
Maia Roos	Blues Women	0	1	Round 3 (vs. Matatū)
Shyrah Tuliau-Tua'a	Chiefs Manawa	0	1	Round 5 (vs. Blues Women)

== Players ==
=== Squads ===
The following squads have been named. Players listed in italics denote non-original squad members:

Blues Women squad
Forwards	Glory Aiono • Danny-Elle Alefosio Fesolai • Taufa Bason • Eloise Blackwell • Dajian Brown • Zara Feaunati • Grace Gago • Aldora Itunu • Tafito Lafaele • Atlanta Lolohea • Liana Mikaele-Tu'u • Nijiho Nagata • Cilia-Marie Po'e-Tofaeono • Maia Roos • Amarante Sititi • Harono Te Iringa • Cheyenne Tuli-Fale • Ma'ama Mo'onia Vaipulu • Chryss Viliko
Backs	Sylvia Brunt • Ruahei Demant • Ella Henderson • Jaymie Kolose • Mele Latu'ila • Danii Mafoe • Hollyrae Mete • Sariyah Paitai • Mererangi Paul • Ffion Penney • Braxton Sorensen-McGee • Aleiyah Tuala • Hazel Tubic • Tara Turner • Katelyn Vaha'akolo
Coach	Willie Walker

Chiefs Manawa squad
Forwards	Mia Anderson • Jade Coates • Tynealle Fitzgerald • Vici-Rose Green • Chyna Hohepa • Olivia Holten • Chyann Kaitapu • Leomie Kloppers • Finau Mafi • Veisinia Mahutariki-Fakalelu • Te Urupounamu McGarvey • Amber Mundell • Lonita Ngalu • Leata Puni Lio • Nicole Purdom • Kennedy Tukuafu • Jessie Wharekura
Backs	Reese Anderson • Ariana Bayler • Louise Blyde • Carys Dallinger • Madison Flutey • Huia Harding • Lela Ieremia • Justine McGregor • Levonah Motuliki • Kaea Nepia • Kiriana Nolan • Manaia Nuku • Holli O'Sullivan • Shoshanah Seumanutafa • Presayus Singh • Shyrah Tuliau-Tua'a
Coach	Dwayne Sweeney

Hurricanes Poua squad
Forwards	Neve Anglesey • Keelah Bodle • Faythe Finau • Anahera Hamahona • Tegan Hollows • Greer Muir • Angel Mulu • Krystal Murray • Lily Murray-Wihongi • Stacey Niao • Mo'omo'oga Palu • Brooke Rempel • Keiana Roffey • Layla Sae • Ngano Tavake • Samantha Taylor • Jordyn Tihore • Valini Vaka • Brianna Wallace
Backs	Litia Bulicakau • Te Rauoriwa Gapper • Leilani Hakiwai • Iritana Hohaia • Renee Holmes • Fia Laikong • Arene Landon-Lane • Ayesha Leti-I'iga • Paige Lush • Kokako Raki • Hinemaringi Scott • Molly Scuffil-McCabe • Rangimarie Sturmey • Keira Su'a-Smith • Wikitoria Viljoen
Coach	Hayden Triggs

Matatū squad
Forwards	Laura Bayfield • Chelsea Bremner • Natalie Delamere • Emma Dermody • Eilis Doyle • Holly Greenway • Jett Hayward • Lucy Jenkins • Sarah Jones • Sophie Kerr • Elinor-Plum King • Paris Lokotui • Phillipa Love • Kaipo Olsen-Baker • Marcelle Parkes • Georgia Ponsonby • Maddi Robinson • Wikitoria Rogers • Fiaali'i Solomona • Santo Taumata
Backs	Poppy Baxter • Grace Brooker • Maia Davis • Maia Joseph • Hannah King • Kelsyn McCook • Lialanie Muamua • Winnie Palamo • Abigail Paton • Amy du Plessis • Charntay Poko • Alena Saili • Naomi Sopoaga • Charlotte Va'afusuaga
Coach	Blair Baxter

== See also ==
- 2026 Super Rugby Women's season
- 2026 Super Rugby Pacific season
