= 2026 Pacific Four Series =

Women's rugby union tournament

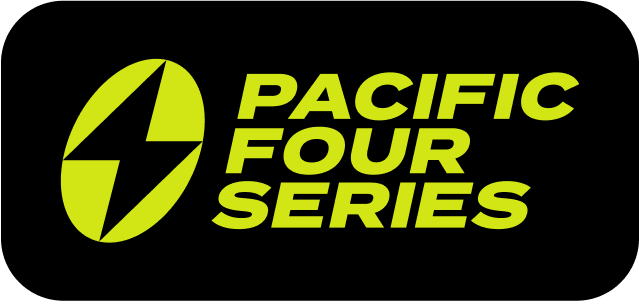

Tournament details
- Hosts: Australia; United States
- Date: 11–25 April 2026
- Countries: Australia; Canada; New Zealand; United States

Final positions
- Champions: New Zealand (4th title)
- Runner-up: Canada

Tournament statistics
- Matches played: 6
- Tries scored: 45 (7.5 per match)
- Top scorer(s): (New Zealand) Renee Holmes (39)
- Most tries: (New Zealand) Mererangi Paul (United States) Hope Rogers (both 4)

The 2026 Pacific Four Series was the sixth edition of the Pacific Four Series, an international women's rugby union tournament, that took place from 11 to 25 April 2026.

The series started in the United States with all four teams competing in Sacramento and Kansas City. The final round saw the United States and Canada play their match in Chicago, followed by Australia hosting New Zealand on 25 April 2026 on the Sunshine Coast in a historic, first-ever test match between both nations played on Anzac Day.

New Zealand retained their Pacific Four Series title after a 40–5 victory over Australia on the final match day of the Series.

== Participants ==
Team	Stadia			Head coach	Captain	World Rugby Ranking	
Team	Home stadium	Capacity	Location	Head coach	Captain	Start (Note: As at 11 April 2026.)	End (Note: As at 27 April 2026.)
Australia	Sunshine Coast Stadium	15,000	Sunshine Coast, Queensland	Sam Needs	Siokapesi Palu	7th	8th
Canada	—N/a			Kévin Rouet	Alexandra Tessier	2nd	3rd
New Zealand	—N/a			Whitney Hansen	Kennedy Tukuafu; Ruahei Demant	3rd	2nd
United States	Heart Health Park	11,569	Sacramento, California	Jack Hanratty	Erica Jarrell-Searcy	8th	7th
United States	CPKC Stadium	11,500	Kansas City, Missouri	Jack Hanratty	Erica Jarrell-Searcy	8th	7th
United States	SeatGeek Stadium	20,000	Bridgeview, Illinois	Jack Hanratty	Erica Jarrell-Searcy	8th	7th

== Table ==
Pos	Team	Pld	W	D	L	PF	PA	PD	TF	TA	TB	LB	Pts	NZL	CAN	USA	AUS
1	New Zealand	3	3	0	0	124	34	+90	19	5	3	0	15	—			
2	Canada	3	2	0	1	88	48	+40	14	2	2	0	10	14–36	—		24–0
3	United States	3	1	0	2	60	110	−50	9	17	1	0	5	15–48	12–50	—	33–12
4	Australia	3	0	0	3	17	97	−80	3	15	0	0	0	5–40			—

Updated to match(es) played on 25 April 2026. Source: World Rugby

== Fixtures ==
The full schedule for the series was announced on 11 February 2026 by World Rugby. 5 of the 6 games will be held in the United States meaning Canada and New Zealand will have no home games.

=== Round 1 ===
11 April 2026
16:00 PDT (UTC-7)

United States	15–48	New Zealand
Try: Rogers 4' c Coulibaly 33' m Con: Vogel (1/2) 5'; Pen: Vogel (1/1) 13'	Report	Try: Paul (3) 7' c, 10' m, 51' m Brunt 31' c Holmes (2) 47' c, 55' c King 64' c Con: Holmes (5/7) 8', 32', 48', 56', 65'; Pen: Holmes (1/1) 80'

Heart Health Park, Sacramento
Referee: Julianne Zussman (Canada)

Team details

FB	15	Alev Kelter
RW	14	Bulou Mataitoga
OC	13	Emily Henrich
IC	12	Katana Howard	(substituted off) 63'
LW	11	Erica Coulibaly
FH	10	Bella Vogel	(substituted off) 70'
SH	9	Cass Bargell	(substituted off) 52'
N8	8	Freda Tafuna	(substituted off) 60'
OF	7	Georgie Perris-Redding
BF	6	Hann Humphreys
RL	5	Erica Jarrell-Searcy (c)	(substituted off) 75'
LL	4	Hallie Taufoou
TP	3	Keia Mae Sagapolu	(substituted off) 60'
HK	2	Kathryn Treder	(substituted off) 72'
LP	1	Hope Rogers	(substituted off) 72'
Replacements:
HK	16	Hope Cooper	(substituted on) 72'
PR	17	Reece Woods	(substituted on) 72'
PR	18	Alivia Leatherman	(substituted on) 60'
LK	19	Emerson Allen	(substituted on) 75'
BR	20	Ina Bailey	(substituted on) 60'
SH	21	Abigail Paton	(substituted on) 52'
FH	22	Kristin Bitter	(substituted on) 70'
WG	23	Telesi Uhatafe	(substituted on) 63'
Coach:
(Ireland) Jack Hanratty

FB	15	Renee Holmes
RW	14	Mererangi Paul		(substituted off) 59'
OC	13	Amy du Plessis		(substituted off) 59'
IC	12	Sylvia Brunt
LW	11	Ayesha Leti-I'iga
FH	10	Ruahei Demant (cc)
SH	9	Maia Joseph		(substituted off) 56'
N8	8	Kaipo Olsen-Baker
OF	7	Kennedy Tukuafu (cc)		(substituted off) 59'
BF	6	Liana Mikaele-Tu'u	(yellow card) 40'	(substituted off) 19'	(substituted on) 33'	(substituted off) 72'
RL	5	Laura Bayfield		(substituted off) 56'
LL	4	Maia Roos
TP	3	Veisinia Mahutariki-Fakalelu		(substituted off) 57'	(substituted on) 59'
HK	2	Georgia Ponsonby		(substituted off) 49'	(substituted on) 75'
LP	1	Chryss Viliko		(substituted off) 62'
Replacements:
LK	16	Vici-Rose Green	(yellow card) 71'	(substituted on) 49'
PR	17	Maddison Robinson		(substituted on) 62'
PR	18	Tanya Kalounivale	(red card) 58'	(substituted on) 56'
LK	19	Maama Mo'onia Vaipulu		(substituted on) 56'
FL	20	Mia Anderson		(substituted on) 19'	(substituted off) 33'	(substituted on) 72'	(substituted off) 75'
SH	21	Tara Turner		(substituted on) 56'
FH	22	Hannah King		(substituted on) 59'
WG	23	Justine McGregor		(substituted on) 59'
Coach:
(New Zealand) Whitney Hansen

Assistant referees:
Emma Gallagher (Canada)
Kristine Lovatt (Canada)
Television match official:
Cam Russell (Canada)
Foul play review officer:
Derek Summers (United States)

Notes:

- Bella Vogel, Hann Humphreys, Hope Cooper, Reece Woods, Abigail Paton and Telesi Uhatafe (all United States) made their international debuts.
- Mia Anderson, Tara Turner, Justine McGregor, and Maddison Robinson (all New Zealand) made their international debuts.

11 April 2026
19:00 PDT (UTC-7)

Canada	24–0	Australia
Try: Omokhuale 18' m Buisa 39' c Hogan-Rochester 66' m Idowu 73' c Con: Gallagher (2/4) 39', 74'	Report

Heart Health Park, Sacramento
Referee: Aurélie Groizeleau (France)

Team details

FB	15	Chloe Daniels	(substituted off) 67'
RW	14	Asia Hogan-Rochester
OC	13	Shoshanah Seumanutafa
IC	12	Claire Gallagher
LW	11	Aurora Bowie
FH	10	Taylor Perry
SH	9	Justine Pelletier (c)	(substituted off) 74'
N8	8	Fabiola Forteza
OF	7	Gabrielle Senft	(substituted off) 50'
BF	6	Pamphinette Buisa
RL	5	Laetitia Royer	(substituted off) 59'
LL	4	Julia Omokhuale	(substituted off) 74'
TP	3	DaLeaka Menin	(substituted off) 72'
HK	2	Emily Tuttosi	(substituted off) 71'
LP	1	Brittany Kassil	(substituted off) 74'
Replacements:
HK	16	Kiki Idowu	(substituted on) 71'
PR	17	Sierra Gillis	(substituted on) 74'
PR	18	Brooke Rempel	(substituted on) 72'
LK	19	Ashlynn Smith	(substituted on) 74'
FL	20	Sophie de Goede	(substituted on) 50'
LK	21	Rachel Smith	(substituted on) 59'
SH	22	Corinne Frechette	(substituted on) 74'
WG	23	Paige Farries	(substituted on) 67'
Coach:
(France) Kévin Rouet

FB	15	Faitala Moleka
RW	14	Maya Stewart
OC	13	Georgina Friedrichs
IC	12	Sidney Taylor		(substituted off) 56'
LW	11	Desiree Miller
FH	10	Nicole Ledington		(substituted off) 50'
SH	9	Samantha Wood
N8	8	Siokapesi Palu (c)		(substituted off) 60'
OF	7	Emily Chancellor
BF	6	Kaitlan Leaney
RL	5	Tiarah Minns		(substituted off) 62'
LL	4	Michaela Leonard		(substituted off) 50'
TP	3	Bridie O'Gorman		(substituted off) 40'
HK	2	Adiana Talakai		(substituted off) 40'	(substituted on) 76'
LP	1	Brianna Hoy		(substituted off) 62'	(substituted on) 76'
Replacements:
HK	16	Brittany Merlo	(yellow card) 72'	(substituted on) 40'
PR	17	Faliki Pohiva		(substituted on) 62'	(substituted off) 76'
PR	18	Eva Karpani		(substituted on) 40'
LK	19	Ashley Fernandez		(substituted on) 62'
FL	20	Lily Bone		(substituted on) 60'	(substituted off) 76'
BR	21	Piper Duck		(substituted on) 50'
WG	22	Waiaria Ellis		(substituted on) 50'
CE	23	Cecilia Smith	(yellow card) 73'	(substituted on) 56'
Coach:
(Australia) Sam Needs

Assistant referees:
Amelia Luciano (United States)
Alexis Saari (United States)
Television match official:
Derek Summers (United States)
Foul play review officer:
Cam Russell (Canada)

Notes:

- Chloe Daniels, Aurora Bowie, Kiki Idowu, Sierra Gillis, Brooke Rempel and Corinne Frechette (all Canada) made their international debuts.

=== Round 2 ===
17 April 2026
17:15 CDT (UTC-5)

Canada	14–36	New Zealand
Try: Hogan-Rochester 21' c Penalty try 38'; Con: Gallagher (1/1) 22'	Report	Try: Tukuafu 28' m Paul 52' m Olsen-Baker (2) 60' c, 75' m Vaipulu 63' c du Plessis 72' c Con: Holmes (3/6) 61', 64', 73'

CPKC Stadium, Kansas City
Referee: Aimee Barrett-Theron (South Africa)

Team details

FB	15	Claire Gallagher
RW	14	Asia Hogan-Rochester
OC	13	Shoshanah Seumanutafa
IC	12	Alexandra Tessier (c)
LW	11	Aurora Bowie		(substituted off) 32'	(substituted on) 36'
FH	10	Taylor Perry		(substituted off) 70'
SH	9	Justine Pelletier		(substituted off) 70'
N8	8	Fabiola Forteza		(substituted off) 64'
OF	7	Julia Omokhuale
BF	6	Gabrielle Senft		(substituted off) 62'
RL	5	Laetitia Royer
LL	4	Sophie de Goede		(substituted off) 54'
TP	3	DaLeaka Menin		(substituted off) 73'
HK	2	Emily Tuttosi		(substituted off) 67'
LP	1	Brittany Kassil	(yellow card) 26'	(substituted off) 73'
Replacements:
HK	16	Kiki Idowu		(substituted on) 67'
PR	17	Maya Montiel		(substituted on) 32'	(substituted off) 36'	(substituted on) 73'
PR	18	Cassandra Tuffnail		(substituted on) 73'
LK	19	Rachel Smith		(substituted on) 62'
BR	20	Pamphinette Buisa		(substituted on) 54'
BR	21	Lizzie Gibson		(substituted on) 64'
SH	22	Corinne Frechette		(substituted on) 70'
FB	23	Chloe Daniels		(substituted on) 70'
Coach:
(France) Kévin Rouet

FB	15	Renee Holmes
RW	14	Mererangi Paul		(substituted off) 70'
OC	13	Amy du Plessis
IC	12	Sylvia Brunt		(substituted off) 73'
LW	11	Ayesha Leti-I'iga
FH	10	Ruahei Demant (cc)
SH	9	Maia Joseph		(substituted off) 25'
N8	8	Kaipo Olsen-Baker
OF	7	Kennedy Tukuafu (cc)
BF	6	Liana Mikaele-Tu'u		(substituted off) 44'	(substituted on) 49'	(substituted off) 65'
RL	5	Laura Bayfield		(substituted off) 53'
LL	4	Maia Roos
TP	3	Veisinia Mahutariki-Fakalelu		(substituted off) 70'
HK	2	Georgia Ponsonby	(yellow card) 38'	(substituted off) 64'
LP	1	Chryss Viliko		(substituted off) 64'
Replacements:
LK	16	Vici-Rose Green		(substituted on) 44'	(substituted off) 49'	(substituted on) 64'
PR	17	Maddison Robinson		(substituted on) 64'
PR	18	Tanya Kalounivale		(substituted on) 70'
SR	19	Maama Mo'onia Vaipulu		(substituted on) 53'
BR	20	Mia Anderson		(substituted on) 65'
FH	21	Tara Turner		(substituted on) 25'
FH	22	Hannah King		(substituted on) 73'
WG	23	Justine McGregor		(substituted on) 70'
Coach:
(New Zealand) Whitney Hansen

Assistant referees:
Amelia Luciano (United States)
Lindsey Oliver (United States)
Television match official:
Derek Summers (United States)
Foul play review officer:
Cam Russell (Canada)

Notes:

- Lizzie Gibson made her international debut for Canada.

17 April 2026
20:00 CDT (UTC-5)

United States	33–12	Australia
Try: Rogers (2) 11' c, 68' c Perris-Redding 27' c Tafuna 57' c Emily Henrich 79' m Con: Vogel (4/4) 12', 28', 58', 68'; Kristin Bitter (0/1)	Report	Try: Palu 19' c Miller 48' m Con: Wood (1/2) 20'

CPKC Stadium, Kansas City
Referee: Julianne Zussman (Canada)

Team details

FB	15	Alev Kelter
RW	14	Bulou Mataitoga
OC	13	Emily Henrich
IC	12	Katana Howard
LW	11	Erica Coulibaly
FH	10	Bella Vogel		(substituted off) 77'
SH	9	Cass Bargell		(substituted off) 50'
N8	8	Freda Tafuna		(substituted off) 66'
OF	7	Georgie Perris-Redding
BF	6	Hann Humphreys		(substituted off) 74'
RL	5	Erica Jarrell-Searcy (c)		(substituted off) 77'
LL	4	Hallie Taufoou
TP	3	Keia Mae Sagapolu		(substituted off) 40'
HK	2	Kathryn Treder		(substituted off) 61'
LP	1	Hope Rogers	(yellow card) 73'
Replacements:
HK	16	Paige Stathopoulos		(substituted on) 61'
PR	17	Reece Woods		(substituted on) 74'
PR	18	Alivia Leatherman		(substituted on) 40'
SR	19	Kapoina Bailey		(substituted on) 77'
BR	20	Tessa Hann		(substituted on) 66'
SH	21	Abigail Paton		(substituted on) 50'
FH	22	Kristin Bitter		(substituted on) 77'
WG	23	Telesi Uhatafe
Coach:
(Ireland) Jack Hanratty

FB	15	Faitala Moleka
RW	14	Maya Stewart	(yellow card) 15'
OC	13	Georgina Friedrichs
IC	12	Sidney Taylor		(substituted off) 59'
LW	11	Desiree Miller
FH	10	Nicole Ledington		(substituted off) 53'
SH	9	Samantha Wood		(substituted off) 66'
N8	8	Piper Duck		(substituted off) 62'	(substituted on) 74'
OF	7	Emily Chancellor
BF	6	Siokapesi Palu (c)		(substituted off) 35'	(substituted on) 40'	(substituted off) 74'
RL	5	Tiarah Minns		(substituted off) 50'
LL	4	Kaitlan Leaney
TP	3	Eva Karpani		(substituted off) 50'
HK	2	Tania Naden		(substituted off) 61'
LP	1	Brianna Hoy		(substituted off) 50'	(substituted on) 71'
Replacements:
HK	16	Adiana Talakai		(substituted on) 61'
PR	17	Faliki Pohiva		(substituted on) 50'	(substituted off) 71'
PR	18	Bridie O'Gorman		(substituted on) 50'
SR	19	Michaela Leonard		(substituted on) 50'
BR	20	Dillyn Blackburn		(substituted on) 35'	(substituted off) 40'	(substituted on) 62'
SH	21	Ella Ryan		(substituted on) 66'
CE	22	Ava Wereta		(substituted on) 59'
WG	23	Waiaria Ellis		(substituted on) 53'
Coach:
(Australia) Sam Needs

Assistant referees:
Emma Gallagher (Canada)
Kristine Lovatt (Canada)
Television match official:
Cam Russell (Canada)
Foul play review officer:
Derek Summers (United States)

Notes:

- Dillyn Blackburn, Ella Ryan and Ava Wereta made their international debuts for Australia.

=== Round 3 ===
24 April 2026
19:30 CDT (UTC-5)

United States	12–50	Canada
Try: Rogers 8' c Henrich 72' m Con: Vogel (1/2) 9'	Report	Try: De Goede 19' c Pelletier 34' m Menin 40' c Bowie 51' m Gallagher (2) 57' c, 67' c Hogan-Rochester 60' m Tuttosi 64' c Con: Gallagher (5/8) 20', 41', 57', 64', 68'

SeatGeek Stadium, Bridgeview
Referee: Amber McLachlan (Australia)

Team details

FB	15	Alev Kelter
RW	14	Bulou Mataitoga
OC	13	Emily Henrich
IC	12	Katana Howard		(substituted off) 57'
LW	11	Erica Coulibaly
FH	10	Bella Vogel		(substituted off) 75'
SH	9	Abigail Paton		(substituted off) 55'
N8	8	Freda Tafuna		(substituted off) 41'	(substituted on) 48'	(substituted off) 65'
OF	7	Georgie Perris-Redding
BF	6	Hann Humphreys
RL	5	Erica Jarrell-Searcy (c)		(substituted off) 69'
LL	4	Hallie Taufoou
TP	3	Alivia Leatherman		(substituted off) 48'
HK	2	Kathryn Treder		(substituted off) 55'
LP	1	Hope Rogers	(yellow card) 38'	(substituted off) 68'
Replacements:
HK	16	Paige Stathopoulos		(substituted on) 55'
PR	17	Reece Woods		(substituted on) 41'	(substituted off) 48'	(substituted on) 68'
PR	18	Olivia Woods		(substituted on) 48'
SR	19	Kapoina Bailey		(substituted on) 69'
BR	20	Tessa Hann		(substituted on) 65'
SH	21	Cass Bargell		(substituted on) 55'
FH	22	Kristin Bitter		(substituted on) 75'
WG	23	Telesi Uhatafe		(substituted on) 57'
Coach:
(Ireland) Jack Hanratty

FB	15	Claire Gallagher	(substituted off) 69'
RW	14	Asia Hogan-Rochester
OC	13	Shoshanah Seumanutafa
IC	12	Alexandra Tessier (c)
LW	11	Aurora Bowie
FH	10	Taylor Perry
SH	9	Justine Pelletier	(substituted off) 73'
N8	8	Sophie de Goede
OF	7	Gabrielle Senft	(substituted off) 61'
BF	6	Pamphinette Buisa	(substituted off) 64'
RL	5	Laetitia Royer	(substituted off) 73'
LL	4	Julia Omokhuale
TP	3	DaLeaka Menin	(substituted off) 69'
HK	2	Emily Tuttosi	(substituted off) 64'
LP	1	Brittany Kassil	(substituted off) 69'
Replacements:
HK	16	Kiki Idowu	(substituted on) 64'
PR	17	Sierra Gillis	(substituted on) 69'
PR	18	Brooke Rempel	(substituted on) 69'
LK	19	Ashlynn Smith	(substituted on) 73'
BR	20	Rachel Smith	(substituted on) 61'
BR	21	Lizzie Gibson	(substituted on) 64'
SH	22	Mahalia Robinson	(substituted on) 73'
FB	23	Chloe Daniels	(substituted on) 69'
Coach:
(France) Kévin Rouet

Assistant referees:
Amelia Luciano (United States)
Emma Gallagher (Canada)
Television match official:
Quinton Immelman (South Africa)
Foul play review officer:
Derek Summers (United States)

25 April 2026
19:45 AEST (UTC+10)

Australia	5–40	New Zealand
Try: Palu 22' m Con: Wood (0/1)	Report	Try: du Plessis 3' c Leti-I'iga (2) 25' c, 35' c Mahutariki-Fakalelu 41' c McGregor 54' m Bayfield 61' c Con: Holmes (5/6) 4', 25', 36', 42', 61'

Sunshine Coast Stadium, Kawana Waters
Attendance: 5,508
Referee: Aurélie Groizeleau (France)

Team details

FB	15	Waiaria Ellis	(substituted off) 55'
RW	14	Maya Stewart	(substituted off) 67'
OC	13	Georgina Friedrichs
IC	12	Sidney Taylor
LW	11	Desiree Miller
FH	10	Faitala Moleka	(substituted off) 76'
SH	9	Samantha Wood	(substituted off) 61'	(substituted on) 76'
N8	8	Siokapesi Palu (c)
OF	7	Lily Bone	(substituted off) 49'
BF	6	Kaitlan Leaney
RL	5	Tiarah Minns
LL	4	Michaela Leonard	(substituted off) 61'
TP	3	Eva Karpani	(substituted off) 49'
HK	2	Tania Naden	(substituted off) 61'
LP	1	Brianna Hoy	(substituted off) 61'
Replacements:
HK	16	Brittany Merlo	(substituted on) 61'
PR	17	Martha Fua	(substituted on) 61'
PR	18	Bridie O'Gorman	(substituted on) 49'
LK	19	Ashley Fernandez	(substituted on) 61'
FL	20	Piper Duck	(substituted on) 49'
BR	21	Piper Simons	(substituted on) 61'
WG	22	Ava Wereta	(substituted on) 67'
CE	23	Nicole Ledington	(substituted on) 55'
Coach:
(Australia) Sam Needs

FB	15	Renee Holmes	(substituted off) 66'
RW	14	Justine McGregor
OC	13	Amy du Plessis
IC	12	Sylvia Brunt	(substituted off) 49'
LW	11	Ayesha Leti-I'iga
FH	10	Ruahei Demant (cc)
SH	9	Maia Joseph	(substituted off) 49'
N8	8	Kaipo Olsen-Baker
OF	7	Kennedy Tukuafu (cc)
BF	6	Liana Mikaele-Tu'u	(substituted off) 66'
RL	5	Laura Bayfield
LL	4	Maia Roos	(substituted off) 49'
TP	3	Mo'omo'oga Palu	(substituted off) 37'
HK	2	Georgia Ponsonby	(substituted off) 49'
LP	1	Chryss Viliko	(substituted off) 61'
Replacements:
LK	16	Atlanta Lolohea	(substituted on) 49'
PR	17	Maddison Robinson	(substituted on) 61'
PR	18	Veisinia Mahutariki-Fakalelu	(substituted on) 37'
LK	19	Maama Mo'onia Vaipulu	(substituted on) 49'
FL	20	Mia Anderson	(substituted on) 66'
SH	21	Tara Turner	(substituted on) 49'
FH	22	Hannah King	(substituted on) 49'
WG	23	Mererangi Paul	(substituted on) 66'
Coach:
(New Zealand) Whitney Hansen

Assistant referees:
Emma Gallagher (Canada)
Kristine Lovatt (Canada)
Television match official:
Cam Russell (Canada)
Foul play review officer:
Derek Summers (United States)

== Player statistics ==
=== Most points ===
Rank	Name	Team	Points
1	Renee Holmes	New Zealand	39
2	Claire Gallagher	Canada	26
3	Mererangi Paul	New Zealand	20
3	Hope Rogers	United States	20
5	Asia Hogan-Rochester	Canada	15
5	Bella Vogel	United States	15
7	Amy du Plessis	New Zealand	10
7	Emily Henrich	United States	10
7	Ayesha Leti-I'iga	New Zealand	10
7	Kaipo Olsen-Baker	New Zealand	10
7	Siokapesi Palu	Australia	10

=== Most tries ===
Rank	Name	Team	Tries
1	Mererangi Paul	New Zealand	4
1	Hope Rogers	United States	4
3	Asia Hogan-Rochester	Canada	3
4	Renee Holmes	New Zealand	2
4	Claire Gallagher	Canada	2
4	Amy du Plessis	New Zealand	2
4	Emily Henrich	United States	2
4	Ayesha Leti-I'iga	New Zealand	2
4	Kaipo Olsen-Baker	New Zealand	2
4	Siokapesi Palu	Australia	2

== Discipline ==
=== Citings/bans ===
Player	Match (Note: The team of the cited player is listed in bold italics.)	Match date	Law breached	Result	Ref
Tanya Kalounivale	United States v. New Zealand	11 April 2026 (Round 1)	9.20(b) – Contact above the shoulders in the ruck (Red card)	Red card rescinded	

== See also ==
- 2026 Laurie O'Reilly Cup
