= 2025 Super Rugby Aupiki season =

- Countries: New Zealand
- Tournament format(s): Round-robin and knockout
- Champions: Blues (2nd title)
- Matches played: 13
- Tries scored: 104 (8 per match)
- Top point scorer(s): Hannah King (51 points) Matatū
- Top try scorer(s): Ruby Tui (6 tries) Chiefs Manawa
- Official website: Super Rugby Aupiki

The 2025 Super Rugby Aupiki season was the fourth and most recent season of the top-flight New Zealand women's rugby union competition, Super Rugby. The season fixtures were released on 20 November 2024, consisting of six rounds and a Grand Final to decide the season champions.

It was revealed during the season draw that the Super Rugby Aupiki champions would play the champions of the Australian Super Rugby competition, Super Rugby Women's, at the end of the season. This new competition, which is formatted similarly to a super cup, is called the Super Rugby Champions Final. It was the first edition of the new competition.

The defending champions were the Blues, who defeated two-time runners-up Chiefs Manawa 24–18 in last seasons (2024) Grand Final. The Blues successfully defended their title against Matatū in the final and won their second consecutive championship.

== Teams ==
Team base of the 2025 Super Rugby Aupiki teams

=== Stadia and locations ===
Union	Team	Location(s)	Stadia	Capacity
Auckland	Blues	Kingsland, Auckland Region	Eden Park	50,000
Auckland	Blues	Whangārei, Northland Region	Okara Park	30,000
Waikato	Chiefs Manawa	Hamilton, Waikato Region	Waikato Stadium	25,800
Wellington	Hurricanes Poua	Pipitea, Wellington Region	Wellington Regional Stadium	34,500
Wellington	Hurricanes Poua	Upper Hutt, Wellington Region	NZCIS	—N/a
Canterbury	Matatū	Addington, Canterbury Region	Rugby League Park	17,104
Canterbury	Matatū	Nelson, Tasman District	Trafalgar Park, Nelson	18,000
Canterbury	Matatū	Aidanfield, Canterbury Region	Ngā Puna Wai Sports Hub	1,000

=== Personnel ===
Team	Coach	Captain
Blues	Willie Walker	Maia Roos
Chiefs Manawa	Dwayne Sweeney	Kennedy Tukuafu
Hurricanes Poua	Fusi Feaunati	Jackie Patea-Fereti
Matatū	Whitney Hansen	Alana Bremner

== Ladder ==
Pos	Team	Pld	W	D	L	PF	PA	PD	TB	LB	Pts	Qualification
1	Blues	6	5	0	1	216	123	+93	4	0	24	Advance to Grand Final
2	Matatū	6	4	0	2	169	141	+28	2	1	19	Advance to Grand Final
3	Chiefs Manawa	6	3	0	3	169	127	+42	2	2	16	
4	Hurricanes Poua	6	0	0	6	81	244	−163	0	0	0	

Source: Super Rugby Aupiki
Rules for classification: Tiebreakers for teams tied on points: 1) Number of matches won; 2) Head-to-head record; 3) Difference between points for and against; 4) Total number of points for.

== Matches ==
=== Round 1 ===
1 March
14:05 NZDT (UTC+13)

Chiefs Manawa	25–31	Matatū
Try: Ruby Tui (2); Reese Anderson; Kennedy Tukuafu; Con: Renee Holmes; Pen: Renee Holmes		Try: Laura Bayfield; Winnie Palamo; Amy du Plessis (2); Con: Hannah King (4); Pen: Hannah King

Waikato Stadium
Referee: Maggie Cogger-Orr

1 March
16:35 NZDT (UTC+13)

Hurricanes Poua	10–50	Blues
Try: Isabella Waterman; Denise Aiolupotea		Try: Ruahei Demant (2); Portia Woodman-Wickliffe; Braxton Sorensen-McGee; Grace Gago (2); Sylvia Brunt; Con: Krysten Cottrell (3); Ruahei Demant (3); Pen: Krysten Cottrell

Wellington Regional Stadium
Referee: Ben Woolerton

=== Round 2 ===
7 March
17:05 NZDT (UTC+13)

Blues	24–22	Chiefs Manawa
Try: Ruahei Demant; Katelyn Vaha'akolo; Jaymie Kolose; Portia Woodman-Wickliffe; Con: Ruahei Demant (2)		Try: Vici-Rose Green; Grace Houpapa-Barrett; Renee Holmes; Con: Renee Holmes; Kelly Brazier; Pen: Renee Holmes

Eden Park
Referee: Todd Petrie

9 March
12:35 NZDT (UTC+13)

Matatū	29–7	Hurricanes Poua
Try: Grace Brooker; Kaea Nepia (2); Winnie Palamo; Lucy Jenkins; Con: Hannah King (2)		Try: Ayesha Leti-I'iga; Con: Cassie Siataga

Rugby League Park
Referee: Warwick Lahmert

=== Round 3 ===
15 March
14:05 NZDT (UTC+13)

Matatū	7–28	Blues
Try: Hannah King; Con: Hannah King		Try: Sylvia Brunt (2); Braxton Sorensen-McGee; Atlanta Lolohea; Con: Ruahei Demant (2/2); Tara Turner; Krysten Cottrell

Trafalgar Park
Referee: Maggie Cogger-Orr

15 March
16:35 NZDT (UTC+13)

Chiefs Manawa	46–7	Hurricanes Poua
Try: Ruby Tui (2); Azalleyah Ma′aka; Jade Coates; Luka Connor; Renee Holmes; Vici-Rose Green; Tenika Willison; Con: Renee Holmes (3/8)		Try: Cassie Siataga; Con: Cassie Siataga

Waikato Stadium
Referee: Ben Woolerton

=== Round 4 ===
22 March
14:05 NZDT (UTC+13)

Hurricanes Poua	24–43	Matatū
Try: Ngano Tavake; Ayesha Leti-I'iga; Elinor-Plum King; Leilani Hakiwai; Con: Cassie Siataga (2/4)		Try: Kaipo Olsen-Baker (2); Keighley Simpson; Winnie Palamo; Lucy Jenkins; Maia Joseph; Alana Bremner; Con: Hannah King (4/7)

NZCIS
Referee: Warwick Lahmert

22 March
16:35 NZDT (UTC+13)

Chiefs Manawa	21–36	Blues
Try: Kelly Brazier; Kate Henwood; Ariana Bayler; Con: Kelly Brazier (3/3)		Try: Jaymie Kolose; Liana Mikaele-Tu'u; Krysten Cottrell; Portia Woodman-Wickliffe; Braxton Sorensen-McGee; Sylvia Brunt; Con: Krysten Cottrell (3/6)

Waikato Stadium
Referee: Todd Petrie

=== Round 5 ===
29 March
14:05 NZDT (UTC+13)

Blues	29–37	Matatū
Try: Portia Woodman-Wickliffe; Aldora Itunu; Taufa Bason (2); Katelyn Vaha'akolo; Con: Ruahei Demant; Krysten Cottrell		Try: Mo'omo'oga Palu; Lucy Jenkins (2); Fia Laikong; Kaea Nepia; Con: Hannah King (3); Pen: Hannah King (2)

Okara Park
Referee: Natarsha Ganley

29 March
16:35 NZDT (UTC+13)

Hurricanes Poua	7–27	Chiefs Manawa
Try: Te Rauoriwa Gapper; Con: Cassie Siataga		Try: Ruby Tui; Mererangi Paul; Renee Holmes; Mia Anderson; Con: Hazel Tubic

NZCIS
Referee: Erin Doherty

=== Round 6 ===
5 April
14:05 NZDT (UTC+13)

Matatū	22–28	Chiefs Manawa
Try: Kaipo Olsen-Baker; Winnie Palamo; Sarah Jones; Con: Hannah King (1/1); Kaea Nepia (1/2); Pen: Hannah King (1/1)		Try: Reese Anderson; Ruby Tui; Veisinia Mahutariki-Fakalelu; Grace Kukutai; Con: Renee Holmes (4/4)

Ngā Puna Wai Sports Hub
Referee: Maggie Cogger-Orr

5 April
16:35 NZDT (UTC+13)

Blues	49–26	Hurricanes Poua
Try: Taufa Bason; Jaymie Kolose; Atlanta Lolohea; Ruahei Demant; Danii Mafoe; Patricia Maliepo; Ma'ama Vaipulu; Con: Krysten Cottrell (7/7)		Try: Ngano Tavake; Forne Burkin; Layla Sae; Te Ruaoriwa Gapper; Con: Cassie Siataga (3/4)

Eden Park
Referee: Natarsha Ganley

== Grand Final ==
12 April
19:05 NZST (UTC+12)

Blues	26–19	Matatū
Try: Ruahei Demant; Chryss Viliko; Portia Woodman-Wickliffe; Braxton Sorensen-McGee; Con: Krysten Cottrell (2); Ruahei Demant (1)		Try: Winnie Palamo; Amy du Plessis; Kaipo Olsen-Baker; Con: Hannah King (2)

Eden Park
Referee: Maggie Cogger-Orr

LP	1	(New Zealand) Chryss Viliko
HK	2	(New Zealand) Atlanta Lolohea
TP	3	(New Zealand) Aldora Itunu
LL	4	(New Zealand) Maiakawanakaulani Roos (c)
RL	5	(New Zealand) Ma'ama Vaipulu
BF	6	(New Zealand) Holly Greenway
OF	7	(New Zealand) Taufa Bason
N8	8	(New Zealand) Liana Mikaele-Tu'u
SH	9	(New Zealand) Tara Turner
FH	10	(New Zealand) Krysten Cottrell
LW	11	(New Zealand) Jaymie Kolose
IC	12	(New Zealand) Ruahei Demant
OC	13	(New Zealand) Portia Woodman-Wickliffe
RW	14	(New Zealand) Katelyn Vaha'akolo
FB	15	(New Zealand) Braxton Sorensen-McGee
Replacements:
HK	16	(New Zealand) Grace Gago
PR	17	(New Zealand) Awhina Tangen-Wainohu
PR	18	(New Zealand) Harono Te Iringa
LF	19	(New Zealand) Eloise Blackwell
LF	20	(New Zealand) Dajian Brown
SH	21	(New Zealand) Kahlia Awa
OC	22	(New Zealand) Sylvia Brunt
WG	23	(New Zealand) Patricia Maliepo
Coach:
(New Zealand) Willie Walker

LP	1	(New Zealand) Pip Love
HK	2	(New Zealand) Georgia Ponsonby
TP	3	(New Zealand) Mo'omo'oga Palu
LL	4	(New Zealand) Stacey Niao
RL	5	(New Zealand) Chelsea Bremner
BF	6	(New Zealand) Alana Bremner (c)
OF	7	(New Zealand) Laura Bayfield
N8	8	(New Zealand) Kaipo Olsen-Baker
SH	9	(New Zealand) Maia Joseph
FH	10	(New Zealand) Hannah King
LW	11	(New Zealand) Cheyelle Robins-Reti
IC	12	(New Zealand) Grace Brooker
OC	13	(New Zealand) Amy du Plessis
RW	14	(New Zealand) Winnie Palamo
FB	15	(New Zealand) Kaea Nepia
Replacements:
HK	16	(New Zealand) Tegan Hollows
PR	17	(New Zealand) Maddi Robinson
PR	18	(New Zealand) Amy Rule
LK	19	(New Zealand) Sarah Jones
LF	20	(New Zealand) Fiaali'i Solomona
SH	21	(New Zealand) Kelsyn McCook
FH	22	(New Zealand) Hollyrae Mete
OC	23	(New Zealand) Fia Laikong
Coach:
(New Zealand) Whitney Hansen

Assistant referees:
Erin Doherty (New Zealand)
Todd Petrie (New Zealand)

TMO:
Estelle Whaiapu (New Zealand)

== Statistics ==
As of 12th April 2025

=== Leading point scorers ===
No.	Player	Team	Points	Average	Details
1	(New Zealand) Hannah King	(New Zealand) Matatū	51	7.3	1 T, 16 C, 4 P, 0 D
2	(New Zealand) Krysten Cottrell	(New Zealand) Blues	44	6.3	1 T, 17 C, 1 P, 0 D
3	(New Zealand) Ruahei Demant	(New Zealand) Blues	43	6.14	5 T, 9 C, 0 P, 0 D
4	(New Zealand) Renee Holmes	(New Zealand) Chiefs	39	6.50	3 T, 9 C, 2 P, 0 D
5	(New Zealand) Ruby Tui	(New Zealand) Chiefs	30	5.0	5 T, 0 C, 0 P, 0 D
6	(New Zealand) Portia Woodman-Wickliffe	(New Zealand) Blues	25	3.6	5 T, 0 C, 0 P, 0 D
6	(New Zealand) Winnie Palamo	(New Zealand) Matatū	25	3.6	5 T, 0 C, 0 P, 0 D
8	(New Zealand) Cassie Siataga	(New Zealand) Hurricanes	21	3.5	1 T, 8 C, 0 P, 0 D
9	(New Zealand) Kaipo Olsen-Baker	(New Zealand) Matatū	20	3.33	4 T, 0 C, 0 P, 0 D
9	(New Zealand) Sylvia Brunt	(New Zealand) Blues	20	3.33	4 T, 0 C, 0 P, 0 D

=== Leading try scorers ===
No.	Player	Team	Tries	Average
1	(New Zealand) Ruby Tui	(New Zealand) Chiefs	6	1.0
2	(New Zealand) Portia Woodman-Wickliffe	(New Zealand) Blues	5	0.71
2	(New Zealand) Ruahei Demant	(New Zealand) Blues	5	0.71
2	(New Zealand) Winnie Palamo	(New Zealand) Matatū	5	0.71
5	(New Zealand) Kaipo Olsen-Baker	(New Zealand) Matatū	4	0.67
5	(New Zealand) Sylvia Brunt	(New Zealand) Blues	4	0.67
5	(New Zealand) Lucy Jenkins	(New Zealand) Matatū	4	0.67
5	(New Zealand) Braxton Sorenson-McGee	(New Zealand) Blues	4	0.67
9	(New Zealand) Amy du Plessis	(New Zealand) Matatū	3	0.43
9	(New Zealand) Renee Holmes	(New Zealand) Chiefs	3	0.43

== Players ==
=== Squads ===
The following squads were named for the 2025 season.

Blues Women squad
Forwards	Eloise Blackwell • Dajian Brown • Oceane Donelley • Sophie Fisher • Holly Greenway • Aldora Itunu • Atlanta Lolohea • Liana Mikaele-Tu′u • Paris Mataroa • Elizabith Moimoi • Lily Murray-Wihongi • Cheyenne Tuli-Fale • Maiakawanakaulani Roos • Awhina Tangen-Wainohu • Harono Te Iringa • Ma′ama Vaipulu • Chryss Viliko
Backs	Kahlia Awa • Sylvia Brunt • Krysten Cottrell • Ruahei Demant • Kerri Johnson • Jaymie Kolose • Danii Mafoe • Patricia Maliepo • Daynah Nankivell • Braxton Sorensen-McGee • Tara-Leigh Turner • Katelyn Vaha'akolo • Portia Woodman-Wickliffe
Coach	Willie Walker

Chiefs Manawa squad
Forwards	Mia Anderson • Rebecca Burch • Jade Coates • Luka Connor • Veisinia Mahutariki-Fakalelu • Vici-Rose Green • Logan Hauraki • Kate Henwood • Chyna Hohepa • Grace Houpapa-Barrett • Tanya Kalounivale • Grace Kukutai • Martha Mataele • Krystal Murray • Charmaine Smith • Santo Taumata • Kennedy Tukuafu
Backs	Reese Anderson • Ariana Bayler • Kelly Brazier • Renee Holmes • Rosie Kelly • Azalleyah Ma′aka • Kiriana Nolan • Holli O'Sullivan • Mererangi Paul • Shoshanah Seumanutafa • Hazel Tubic • Ruby Tui • Tenika Willison
Coach	Dwayne Sweeney

Hurricanes Poua squad
Forwards	Denise Aiolupotea • Forne Burkin • Natalie Delamere • Lavinia Lea • Olioli Mua • Angel Mulu • Joanah Ngan-Woo • Jayme Nuku • Jackie Patea-Fereti • Elinor Plum-King • Nina Poletti • Layla Sae • Ngano Taveke • Samantha Taylor • Kahurangi Sturmey • Esther Faiaoga-Tilo
Backs	Shakira Baker • Raedeen Blake • Teilah Ferguson • Te Rauoriwa Gapper • Leilani Hakiwai • Iritana Hohaia • Harmony Kautai • Ayesha Leti-I'iga • Paige Lush • Cassie Siataga • Rangimarie Sturmey • Monica Tagoai • Payton Takimoana • Isabella Waterman
Coach	Fusi Feaunati

Matatū squad
Forwards	Laura Bayfield • Alana Bremner (c) • Chelsea Bremner • Grace Brooker • Emma Dermody • Eilis Doyle • Jett Hayward • Tegan Hollows • Lucy Jenkins • Sarah Jones • Pip Love • Kaipo Olsen-Baker • Mo'omo'oga Palu • Marcelle Parkes • Georgia Ponsonby • Amy Rule • Fiaali'i Solomona
Backs	Amy du Plessis • Maia Joseph • Hannah King • Fia Laikong • Kelsyn McCook • Hollyrae Mete • Kaea Nepia • Winnie Palamo • Abigail Paton • Chey Robins-Reti • Keighley Simpson • Tayla Simpson • Charlotte Va'afusaga
Coach	Whitney Hansen

== See also ==
- 2025 Super Rugby Women's season
- 2025 Super Rugby Pacific season
- 2025 Women's Super Rugby Champions final
