= 2025 Women's Super Rugby Champions final =

- Event: Super Rugby Champions Final
Blues	NSW Waratahs
36	5
- Match details
- Date: 17 April 2025
- Venue: North Harbour Stadium, Auckland
- Referee: Maggie Cogger Orr (New Zealand)

The 2025 Women's Super Rugby Champions final is the inaugural match of the Super Rugby Champions Final. In November 2024, it was announced that the winners of both the Super Rugby Women's and Super Rugby Aupiki would play each other at the end of their respective seasons. The match will be contested between the nib Blues of New Zealand, and the NSW Waratahs of Australia.

The Blues defeated the NSW Waratahs to win the first-ever Super Rugby Women's Championship final in Auckland.

== Background ==
The Blues defeated Matatū in the 2025 Super Rugby Aupiki Grand Final at Eden Park, and the NSW Waratahs defeated the Queensland Reds in their final at North Sydney Oval.

This will be the first time that both teams will be facing each other officially. They have clashed before in a pre-season trial match which ended in a 36–all draw.

== Road to the final ==
=== Super Rugby Aupiki – Blues ===
Pos	Team	Pld	W	D	L	PF	PA	PD	TB	LB	Pts	Qualification
1	Blues	6	5	0	1	216	123	+93	4	0	24	Advance to Grand Final
2	Matatū	6	4	0	2	169	141	+28	2	1	19	Advance to Grand Final
3	Chiefs Manawa	6	3	0	3	169	127	+42	2	2	16	
4	Hurricanes Poua	6	0	0	6	81	244	−163	0	0	0	

Source: Super Rugby Aupiki

==== Bracket ====
Finals
Blues	26
Matatū	19

=== Super Rugby Women's – NSW Waratahs ===
Pos	Team	Pld	W	D	L	PF	PA	PD	TB	LB	Pts	Qualification
1	New South Wales Waratahs	4	3	0	1	115	81	+34	2	1	15	Advance to Finals
2	Queensland Reds	4	3	0	1	109	87	+22	1	0	13	Advance to Finals
3	Fijiana Drua	4	2	0	2	94	101	−7	0	1	9	Advance to Finals
4	Western Force	4	1	1	2	107	133	−26	0	1	7	Advance to Finals
5	ACT Brumbies	4	0	1	3	89	112	−23	0	2	4	

Source: Super Rugby Women's

==== Bracket ====
Semi-finals
6 April – Leichhardt Oval
NSW Waratahs	54
Western Force	17

Grand Final
12 April – North Sydney
NSW Waratahs	43
Queensland Reds	21

== Final ==
17 April 2025
19:05 NZST (UTC+12)

Blues	36–5	New South Wales Waratahs
Try: Braxton Sorensen-McGee (2); Elizabith Moimoi; Portia Woodman-Wickliffe; Cheyenne Tuli-Fale; Krysten Cottrell; Con: Ruahei Demant (2/3); Krysten Cottrell (2/3)		Try: Desirée Miller

North Harbour Stadium, Auckland
Referee: Maggie Cogger Orr (New Zealand)

LP	1	(New Zealand) Chryss Viliko
HK	2	(New Zealand) Atlanta Lolohea
TP	3	(New Zealand) Aldora Itunu
LL	4	(New Zealand) Maiakawanakaulani Roos (c)
RL	5	(New Zealand) Ma'ama Vaipulu
BF	6	(New Zealand) Holly Greenway
OF	7	(New Zealand) Taufa Bason
N8	8	(New Zealand) Elizabith Moimoi
SH	9	(New Zealand) Tara Turner
FH	10	(New Zealand) Ruahei Demant
LW	11	(New Zealand) Jaymie Kolose
IC	12	(New Zealand) Sylvia Brunt
OC	13	(New Zealand) Portia Woodman-Wickliffe
RW	14	(New Zealand) Katelyn Vaha'akolo
FB	15	(New Zealand) Braxton Sorensen-McGee
Replacements:
HK	16	(New Zealand) Grace Gago
PR	17	(New Zealand) Awhina Tangen-Wainohu
PR	18	(New Zealand) Harono Te Iringa
LF	19	(New Zealand) Cheyenne Tuli-Fale
LF	20	(New Zealand) Dajian Brown
SH	21	(New Zealand) Kerri Johnson
BK	22	(New Zealand) Krysten Cottrell
BK	23	(New Zealand) Patricia Maliepo
Coach:
(New Zealand) Willie Walker

LP	1	(Australia) Bridie O'Gorman
HK	2	(Australia) Britt Merlo
TP	3	(Australia) Faliki Pohiva
LL	4	(Australia) Kaitlan Leaney
RL	5	(Australia) Annabelle Codey
BF	6	(Australia) Nicole Nathan
OF	7	(Australia) Emily Chancellor (c)
N8	8	(Australia) Ruby Anderson
SH	9	(Australia) Tatum Bird
FH	10	(Australia) Arabella McKenzie
LW	11	(Australia) Desirée Miller
IC	12	(Australia) Katrina Barker
OC	13	(Australia) Georgina Friedrichs (vc)
RW	14	(Australia) Jade Sheridan
FB	15	(Australia) Caitlyn Halse
Replacements:
HK	16	(Australia) Millie Parker
PR	17	(Australia) Emily Robinson
PR	18	(Tonga) Seneti Kilisimasi
LK	19	(Australia) Jayjay Taylor
LF	20	(Australia) Anahera Hamahona
SH	21	(Australia) Martha Harvey
BK	22	(Australia) Amelia Whitaker
BK	23	(Australia) Waiaria Ellis
Coach:
(Australia) Michael Ruthven

Assistant referees:
Erin Doherty (New Zealand)
Andy Morton (New Zealand)

TMO:
Estelle Whaiapu (New Zealand)

== See also ==
- 2025 Super Rugby Women's season
- 2025 Super Rugby Aupiki season
