= Emily Henrich =

US international rugby union player

- Born: 10 November 1999 (age 27) Buffalo, New York
- Height: 170 cm (5 ft 7 in)
- University: Dartmouth College

Rugby union career
- Position: Centre
Senior career
Years	Team	Apps	(Points)
2024–	Leicester Tigers	28	(30)
2025	Boston Banshees	4	(20)
International career
Years	Team	Apps	(Points)
2018–	United States	29	(25)
National sevens team
Years	Team		Comps
- United States 7s

Emily Henrich (born 10 November 1999) is an American rugby union player. She represented the United States at the 2025 Women's Rugby World Cup. She previously played for the Boston Banshees and currently competes for the Leicester Tigers in the Premiership Women's Rugby League.

== Early career ==
Henrich started playing flag rugby at 6 years old. Both of her parents played rugby in addition to other sports.

Both of her parents played rugby, her father, Chris, also played football and lacrosse, while her mother Lisa also played field hockey. Her mother coached her rugby team at Orchard Park High School, where she was a three-time High School All-American.

She was a nationally ranked aerial skier and won the Eastern Championships in aerials at 14.

== Rugby career ==
In 2018, while still in Dartmouth College, Henrich made her international debut for the United States against the Black Ferns in Chicago. As a freshman, she won the 2018-2019 MA Sorenson Award, recognizing her as the top women's college rugby player. In the same season, Dartmouth won the NIRA National Championship.

In 2022, she tore her ACL just before the United States squad selection and missed out on the delayed 2021 Rugby World Cup in New Zealand. A year later she tore her LCL on the same knee.

In 2024, she joined Leicester Tigers in the Premiership Women's Rugby competition, playing outside centre and wing. She was named the Player of the Season for the Tigers for the 2025-2026 season.

In February 2025, she was named as a Foundation Five player of the Boston Banshees, competing in the 2025 WER season. On July 17, she was selected for the Eagles side to the 2025 Women's Rugby World Cup that will be held in England. In 2026, she was named to the 32-player squad representing the United States in the 2026 Pacific Four Series.
