= Super Rugby Champions Final =

Annual Australia–New Zealand women's rugby league match

Women's Super Rugby Champions Final
- Sport: Women's rugby union
- Founded: 2025; 1 year ago
- First season: 2025
- Organising body: Rugby Australia; New Zealand Rugby
- Region: Oceania
- Related competitions: Super Rugby W; Super Rugby Aupiki

The Women's Super Rugby Champions Final, also known as the Trans-Tasman Final, is an annual women's rugby union match contested between the winners of the Australian Super Rugby Women's and the New Zealand Super Rugby Aupiki. Played at the conclusion of both league's seasons', the competition format is similar to a super cup.

== History ==
Women's professional rugby union is still being established in Australia, Fiji and New Zealand. Semi-professional competitions were officially launched in 2022 in all three countries. Before 2022 women's rugby union was played in an organised fashion in all three countries however it was largely without remuneration, making it mostly amateur. With the establishment of top-flight rugby union competitions in Australia and New Zealand in 2018 and 2022 respectively, professionalism was actively being advanced. Many players from both countries simultaneously played rugby sevens for their national team on the Women's SVNS circuit or rugby league in the Australian NRL Women's Premiership as both were developed and were actively semi-professional sports.

The men's counterpart competition has been in existence since 1996, with participants from Australia, New Zealand and South Africa. In 2021, following logistical challenges from the COVID-19 pandemic, the established Australian and New Zealand participants played each other in a shortened tournament known as Super Rugby Trans-Tasman. The following year, in 2022, the format switched to a smaller, Pacific-centric competition which included a Fijian team and a team based in New Zealand but made up of players from across the Pacific. Similar to this newly created competition format, it was reported in 2023 that both Rugby Australia (RA) and New Zealand Rugby (NZR) were in negotiation talks about establishing a similar style competition for the women's game. A RA spokesperson told ESPN that they could not come to an agreement. In November 2024, with the publication of the Super Rugby Women's 2025 season fixtures, it was announced that the winners of both Super Rugby W and Super Rugby Aupiki would play each other in a final-like match at the end of their respective seasons.

The Inaugural 2025 Super Rugby Womens Champions Final will be contested between the NIB Blues and NSW Waratahs. The Blues defeated Matatū 26-19 in the 2025 Super Rugby Aupiki Grand Final on Saturday 12 April 2025 at Eden Park, and the NSW Waratahs defeated the Queensland Reds 43–21 on Saturday 12 April 2025 at North Sydney Oval. The inaugural 2025 Super Rugby Women's Champions final was held at North Harbour Stadium on Thursday 17 April 2025. The Blues beat the NSW Waratahs to win the first-ever Super Rugby Championship final.

== List of matches ==
Season	Winners	Score	Runners-up	Venue	Att	Referee
2025	Blues	36–5	NSW Waratahs	North Harbour Stadium, Auckland	TBC	Maggie Cogger Orr (New Zealand)
2026	Blues	24-17	NSW Waratahs	Leichhardt Oval	TBC	Ella Goldsmith (Australia)

== See also ==
- 2025 Super Rugby Women's season
- 2025 Super Rugby Aupiki season
- 2025 Super Rugby Pacific season
