= Danii Mafoe =

- Born: 2 August 2006 (age 20) Auckland, New Zealand

Rugby union career
- Position(s): Wing, Midfield
Provincial / State sides
Years	Team	Apps	(Points)
2024–	Auckland	7	(10)
Super Rugby
Years	Team	Apps	(Points)
2025–	Blues	1	(5)
National sevens team
Years	Team		Comps
2025–	New Zealand 7s		

Danii Mafoe (born 2 August 2006) is a New Zealand rugby union player. She competes for the New Zealand women's national sevens team, and for the Blues Women in the Super Rugby Aupiki competition.

== Career ==
Mafoe attended Mount Albert Grammar School in Auckland. She started off as a league player before converting to rugby union, she went on to play for the Auckland Storm in her last year of school.

She has represented New Zealand's secondary school sevens team. She scored a try on debut for the Blues against Hurricanes Poua in 2025. She was part of the Blues side that claimed the Super Rugby Aupiki title.

Mafoe made her international debut for the Black Ferns sevens team at the 2025 Dubai Sevens. She scored her first international try against Great Britain in Cape Town.

In 2026, she signed a full-time contract with the Black Ferns Sevens.
