= Victoria Grant =

New Zealand rugby union player

- Born: Victoria Blackledge; 26 August 1982 (age 44)
- Height: 1.67 m (5 ft 5 1/2 in)
- Weight: 65 kg (143 lb; 10 st 3 lb)
- Occupation: Physiotherapist

Rugby union career
- Position(s): Wing, fullback
Provincial / State sides
| Years | Team | Apps | (Points) |
| 2006-present | Auckland | | |
International career
| Years | Team | Apps | (Points) |
| 2006–2013 | New Zealand | 18 | (30) |
National sevens team
| Years | Team | | Comps |
| 2009 | New Zealand | | |
Coaching career
- Years: Team
- 2023–: Hurricanes Poua
Medal record
Women's rugby union
Representing New Zealand
Rugby World Cup
| Gold medal – first place | 2006 Canada | Team competition |
| Gold medal – first place | 2010 England | Team competition |
Rugby World Cup Sevens
| Silver medal – second place | 2009 Dubai | Team competition |

Victoria Grant (née Blackledge; b. 26 August 1982) is a New Zealand rugby union coach and former player. She played for New Zealand internationally and for Auckland at provincial level. She was recently appointed as Head Coach of Hurricanes Poua.

== Biography ==
Grant has a bachelor's degree in Health Science majoring in Physiotherapy and a post-graduate diploma in Sports Medicine. She was named Women's player of the year.

Grant was a member of the Black Ferns champion 2006 Rugby World Cup squad. She made her test debut at the tournament on 4 September 2006 against Samoa at Edmonton. She was also part of the 2010 Rugby World Cup winning squad.

In September 2022, Grant was appointed as the new Head Coach of Hurricanes Poua for the 2023 Super Rugby Aupiki season. She will be absent for the 2024 Super Rugby Aupiki season as she will be having her second child, she will return as head coach in 2025.
