= Hayden Triggs =

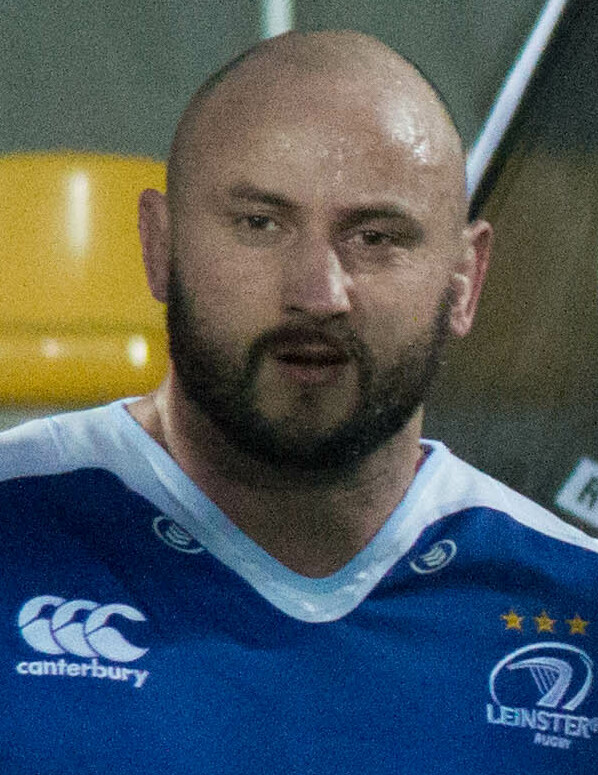
- Born: 22 February 1982 (age 44) Lower Hutt, New Zealand
- Height: 2.01 m (6 ft 7 in)
- Weight: 108 kg (238 lb)
- Occupation: Army mechanic

Rugby union career
- Position: Lock
Senior career
Years	Team	Apps	(Points)
2011–2014	Honda Heat	13	(0)
Provincial / State sides
Years	Team	Apps	(Points)
2002–2008	Manawatu	70	(55)
2009–2010	Otago	26	(10)
2014–2015	North Harbour	20	(0)
2015–2017	Leinster	27	(15)
Super Rugby
Years	Team	Apps	(Points)
2007	Hurricanes	1	(0)
2008–2010	Highlanders	36	(10)
2011	Chiefs	3	(0)
2014–2015	Blues	24	(0)
International career
Years	Team	Apps	(Points)
2007–17	Māori All Blacks	9	(5)
Coaching career
- Years: Team
- 2026–: Hurricanes Poua

Hayden Triggs (born 22 February 1982) is a New Zealand former rugby union player who played as a lock. He last played for Leinster in the Pro14.

== Provincial ==
A former Army mechanic, Triggs was a long-time regular in the Manawatu side, earning 70 caps between 2002 and 2008. Following his signing by the Highlanders in Super 14, Triggs transferred to Otago, appearing in 13 matches in 2009. In the 2010 ITM Cup, Triggs started all 13 matches for Otago and registered two tries. Following the 2010 season, Triggs transferred to Waikato to be closer to his family on the North Island.

== Super Rugby ==
Following his strong performances for Manawatu, Triggs received an opportunity to graduate to the Super 14 competition in 2007 with the Hurricanes, but was limited to only one appearance as a substitute. He had previously been a part of the Hurricanes' Wider Training Group in 2006. For 2008, Triggs moved to the Highlanders, where he emerged as a squad regular making 11 appearances including 7 starts. In 2009, Triggs appeared in all 13 Highlanders matches, starting in 10 of them.

In 2010, Triggs started the season as a substitute behind All-Black Tom Donnelly and Josh Bekhuis, but following a season-ending injury to Donnelly Triggs started the final 8 matches of the season. During this stretch, he scored his first two tries in Super Rugby, and his strong performances saw him selected to the New Zealand Māori squad at year-end.

For the 2011 Super Rugby season, Triggs transferred to the Chiefs. However, he found himself down the pecking order, and made only three appearances during the campaign.

In 2014 he was called into the Blues to replace the injured Culum Retallick.

== International ==
Triggs was first selected to the New Zealand Māori squad for the 2007 Churchill Cup tournament, where he made three appearances (Canada, Ireland A, England Saxons). In 2008, Triggs was again selected for the Māori squad for the Pacific Nations Cup but was ruled out before the tournament because of a stress fracture to his foot. Triggs was again selected to the New Zealand Māori for their 2010 Centenary Series. He scored a try against the Barbarians, and started in the squad's historic victories over Ireland and England.

== Coaching ==
On 30 October 2025, Triggs was appointed as the new Head Coach of Hurricanes Poua for the 2026 Super Rugby Aupiki season.

== Personal life ==
Triggs is a New Zealander of Māori descent (Ngāti Kahungunu descent).
