= Ben Ellis (rugby league) =

New Zealand rugby league footballer

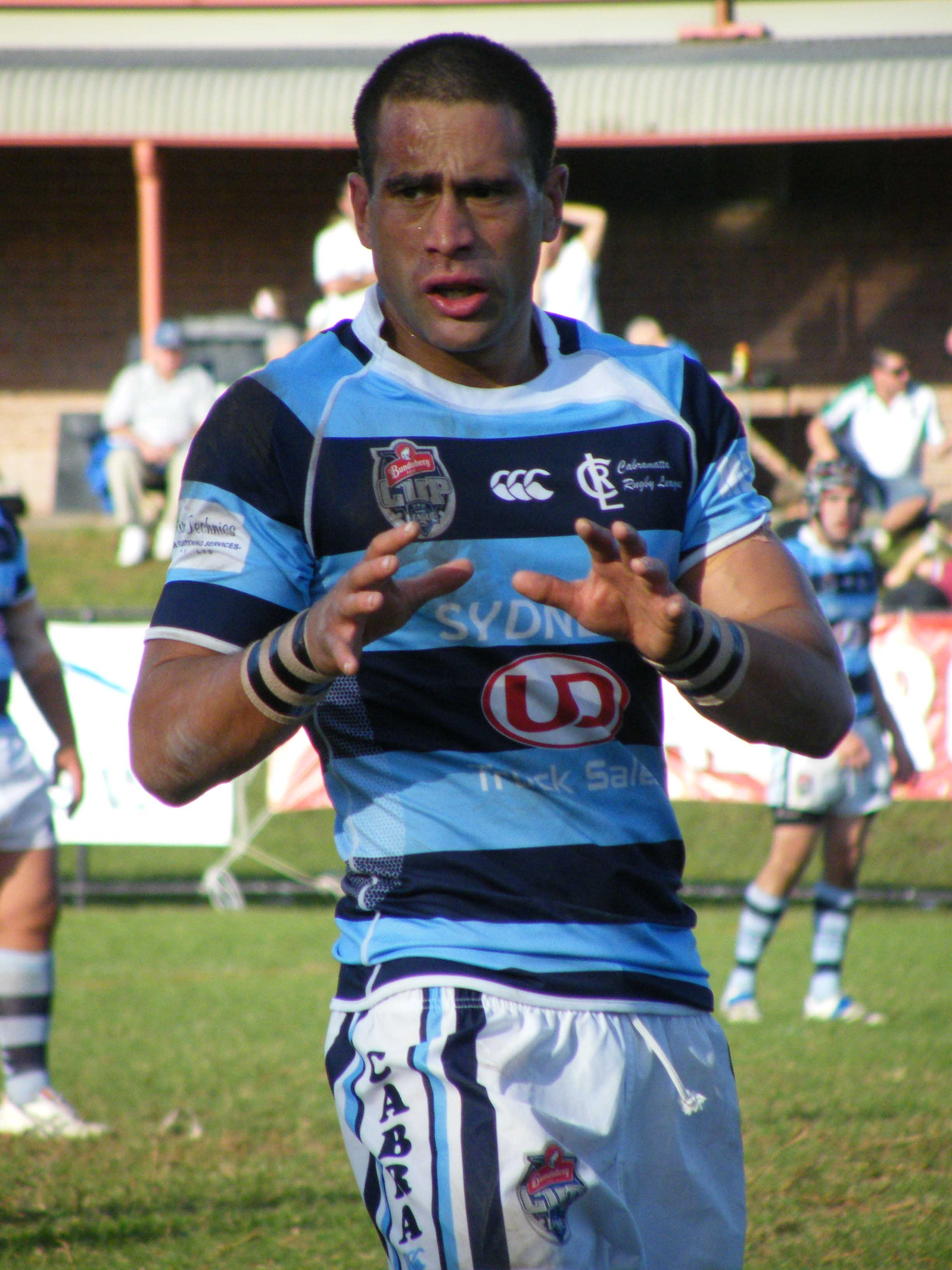

Personal information
- Full name: Ben Ellis
- Born: 14 September 1982 (age 44) Tūrangi, New Zealand

Playing information
- Height: 180 cm (5 ft 11 in)
- Weight: 90 kg (14 st 2 lb; 200 lb)
- Position: Hooker
Club
Years	Team	Pld	T	G	FG	P
2007–08	St George Illawarra	21	2	0	0	8
Representative
Years	Team	Pld	T	G	FG	P
2008	New Zealand Māori	1	0	0	0	0

Ben Ellis (born 14 September 1982) is a New Zealand former professional rugby league footballer who played in the 2000s. A New Zealand Māori representative hooker, he played in the National Rugby League for Australian club St. George Illawarra Dragons.

== Background ==
Born in Tūrangi, Ellis is of Māori, Welsh, and Lebanese descent.

== Playing career ==
A former Junior Kiwi, in 2006 Ellis played for the North Sydney Bears, making a record 1,066 tackles in the NSWRL Premier League season.

In 2007 Ellis joined the St. George Illawarra Dragons in the NRL. Ellis captained the New Zealand Māori rugby league team in the opening match of the 2008 World Cup.

At the end of the 2008 season Ellis was released by the Dragons, and signed with the Cabramatta Two-Blues club in the Bundaberg Cup. In 2009 Ellis was named to play in the New South Wales Residents team. Ellis later played for the Cabramatta Two-Blues in the Ron Massey Cup.

Ellis then played representative Oztag, and was selected to represent Australia at the 2018 World Cup.

== Personal life ==
His daughters Ruby-Jean Kennard-Ellis and Waiaria Ellis are also rugby players.
