= Wesley Clarke =

NZ rugby union coach

- Born: Port Elizabeth, South Africa

Rugby union career
Coaching career
- Years: Team
- 2022: Hurricanes Poua
- 2015–2022: New Zealand Women (Assistant)
- 2010–2013: Manawatu Turbos (Assistant)
- 2025-: Manawatu Turbos

Wesley Clarke is a New Zealand rugby union coach. He is currently the coach of the Manawatu Turbos in the National Provincial Championship.

== Biography ==
Clarke was born in Port Elizabeth, South Africa. He moved to Auckland to play rugby but concussions ended his playing career.

He was the manager and then assistant coach of Manawatu from 2011 to 2013. He was also head coach of the Manawatū Cyclones in 2009 and 2013 and coached the Manawatū Women’s Sevens title to back-to-back national finals, including the title in 2016. Clarke was assistant coach of the Black Ferns from 2015 to 2022, which included victories in the 2017 and 2022 World Cup.

In 2021 Clarke was appointed as the Hurricanes Poua Head Coach ahead of the inaugural season of Super Rugby Aupiki. He stood down after the 2022 season. He was also assistant coach of the New Zealand national under-20 rugby union team in 2023.

After a stint as defence coach at the Kobelco Kobe Steelers in Japan Rugby League One he was appointed as coach of the Manawatu Turbos

Clarke is married to Former Black Fern Farah Palmer.
