= Jack Hanratty =

Irish rugby union coach (born 1989)

- Born: 9 May 1989 (age 37) Skerries, County Dublin, Ireland

Rugby union career
Coaching career
- Years: Team
- 2022–2024: Canada women's 7s
- 2025: Ottawa
- 2026-: USA Women's Eagles
Medal record
Women's rugby sevens
Representing Canada
Olympic Games
Silver medal – second place	2024 Paris	Team competition

Jack Hanratty (born 9 May 1989) is an Irish rugby union coach. He is the current head coach of the USA Women's Eagles as of January 2026. He previously served as the head coach of the Canadian women's sevens team from 2022 to 2024 and the University of Ottawa's Ottawa Gee-Gees women's rugby team in 2025.

== Coaching career ==
=== Ireland ===
Hanratty began his coaching career with his local club, Skerries RFC, before moving on to work in Leinster Rugby's development department from 2007 to 2013. During this time he also served as the head rugby coach for the first XVs team at Dublin City University furing the 2009/2010 season, where they became league champions.

=== Canada ===
Hanratty moved to Canada in 2013 and took the position of Technical/Executive Director with Rugby Nova Scotia and leading the Keltic provincial programs, including the senior men's and women's teams. Within his eight years with the program the provincial programming more than doubled and the Keltics achieved their first ever national medals.

In October 2015, Hanratty began working as the team manager for the Rugby Canada U20 Men's National team during their bid to qualify for the U20 World Cup trophy. He then became the assistant coach for the U18 men's team in 2016 and then the head coach for the U20 women's team and a Rugby Canada Academy coach in 2018.

In September 2021, Hanratty was appointed assistant coach of the Canadian women's sevens team. The following month, he was appointed interim head coach, holding the position for ten months, including a stint at the 2022 Commonwealth Games, where Canada lost to New Zealand in the bronze medal match. On August 9, 2022, Hanratty was promoted to official head coach of the Canadian team. On March 13, 2024, it was announced that he would step down as head coach of the Canadian team after the 2024 Summer Olympics in Paris in order to take over as head coach of the women's rugby section of the Ottawa Gee-Gees. At the aforementioned Paris Olympics, he led the Canadian team to the silver medal after coming from 0–12 behind to defeat Australia 21–12 in the semi-finals, before losing the final to New Zealand 12–19.

Hanratty was head coach of the women's rugby section of the Ottawa Gee-Gees for one season. Under his leadership, the team earned a 5–1 regular season record and placed sixth in Canada during the U SPORTS National Championship tournament in Vancouver. On December 2, 2025, it was announced that Hanratty would be replacing Sione Fukofuka as head coach of the USA Women's Eagles.

=== USA ===
Hanratty stepped into his role as USA Women's Eagles head coach in January 2026. He debuted as coach during the 2026 Pacific Four Series. They lost 15–48 to New Zealand, won 33–12 against Australia, and finally lost 12–50 against Canada.

== Awards ==
In 2017 Hanratty received the Canada Association for Mental Health's "Difference Makers" Award for his work in mental health. In 2025 Hanratty received the Sport Nova Scotia "Coach of the Year" award and the Coaches' Association of Canada "Coaches Excellence Award".
