= Erica Coulibaly =

US international rugby union player (born 2001)

- Born: 26 August 2001 (age 25)
- Height: 1.68 m (5 ft 6 in)
- Weight: 71 kg (157 lb)
- University: University of Iowa

Rugby union career
- Position: Wing
- Current team: Denver Onyx
Senior career
Years	Team	Apps	(Points)
2025-	Denver Onyx		
International career
Years	Team	Apps	(Points)
2025-	United States		
National sevens team
Years	Team		Comps
2025-	United States 7s		

Erica Coulibaly (born 26 August 2001) is an American rugby union footballer who plays for Denver Onyx in the Women's Elite Rugby, and for the United States women's national rugby union team and United States women's national rugby sevens team.

== Career ==
From Illinois, Coulibaly attended University of Iowa. She played for Colorado Gray Wolves in the WPL National Championship. Coulibaly played for the Big Ten in the National Collegiate Rugby (NCR) 7s Cup in Round Rock, Texas, in 2023, scoring four tries in the semi-final as her team progressed to the final, in which they finished runner-up to the West All-Stars. The following year, she was named the 2024 WPL National Championship MVP.

Coulibaly had her debut season in Women's Elite Rugby (WER) for Denver Onyx in the inaugural 2025 Women's Elite Rugby season. She was called-up to the United States women's national rugby union team ahead of their 2025 spring tour matches, and made her senior international 15-a-side debut starting in the left wing against Canada in Kansas City on 2 May 2025. Coulibaly scored the opening try for the United States in a 31-24 victory against Fiji in Washington D.C. in July 2025. She was subsequently named in the United States squad for the 2025 Women's Rugby World Cup in England. Her performances included a try in a 60-0 victory for the United States against Samoa.

Making her SVNS debut for the United States women's national rugby sevens team at the 2025 Dubai Sevens, part of the 2025-26 SVNS, on 29 November 2025, Coulibaly scored the match winning try in the final minute of the United States 21-17 victory over tournament favourites New Zealand. The following year, her performances included a try in the final of the 2026 Spain Sevens in Valladolid.
