= Grace Brooker =

New Zealand rugby union player (born 1999)

- Born: 20 June 1999 (age 27); Rangiora, New Zealand
- Height: 1.73 m (5 ft 8 in)
- Weight: 75 kg (165 lb)

Rugby union career
- Position: Centre
Provincial / State sides
| Years | Team | Apps | (Points) |
| 2017–2023 | Canterbury | 41 | (130) |
Super Rugby
| Years | Team | Apps | (Points) |
| 2022–2025 | Matatū | 12 | (20) |
International career
| Years | Team | Apps | (Points) |
| 2019–2023 | New Zealand | 4 | (0) |
Australian rules football career
- Debut: 20 September 2025, Essendon vs. Fremantle, at Fremantle Oval
Playing career
| Years | Club | Games (Goals) |
| 2025 | Essendon | 5 (2) |

Grace Brooker (born 20 June 1999) is a New Zealand rugby union player and Australian rules footballer. In rugby, she made her test debut for New Zealand in 2019. She has also played for Matatū in the Super Rugby Aupiki competition and represented Canterbury. In Australian rules football, she has played for Essendon in the AFL Women's (AFLW).

== Personal life ==
Brooker attended Christchurch Girls' High School and then graduated with a Bachelor of Sport Coaching in Physical Education from the University of Canterbury.

== Rugby career ==
=== 2019 ===
Brooker made her test debut for New Zealand against Australia on 17 August at Auckland. She scored two tries for the NZ Development XV at the Oceania Rugby Women's Championship in Fiji.

=== 2021 ===
In 2021, she was named in the Black Ferns touring squad to England and France. Brooker earned her first start in the second test match against England. She sustained a knee injury in the 24th minute and was replaced by Patricia Maliepo. She was ruled out of the tour after undergoing knee surgery.

Brooker signed with Matatū for the inaugural season of Super Rugby Aupiki for 2022. However, her ongoing knee injury forced her to miss the competitions debut.

=== 2022–23 ===
Despite missing out on selection for the Black Ferns for their World Cup defence on home soil, Brooker assisted the Black Ferns with video analysis during the tournament.

Brooker was named in the Black Ferns side to compete in the Pacific Four Series and O’Reilly Cup. On 23 September 2023, she captained the Black Ferns XV's team against a Manusina XV's side at Navigation Homes Stadium in Pukekohe. She scored a try in her sides 38–12 victory.

=== 2025 ===
Brooker played in Matatū's 31–25 victory over Chiefs Manawa in Super Rugby Aupiki on the 1st of March.

== Australian rules career ==
In March 2025, AFLW club Essendon announced they had signed Brooker as a rookie. She moved to Australia following the end of the 2025 Super Rugby Aupiki season. She played five games and scored two goals in her debut season in the league. At the end of the season, she left the Bombers to focus on rugby.

=== Statistics ===
Legend
| G | Goals | K | Kicks | D | Disposals | T | Tackles |
| B | Behinds | H | Handballs | M | Marks |

| Season | Team | No. | Games | Totals | | | | | | | Averages (per game) | | | | | | | Votes |
| Season | Team | No. | Games | G | B | K | H | D | M | T | G | B | K | H | D | M | T | Votes |
|---|---|---|---|---|---|---|---|---|---|---|---|---|---|---|---|---|---|---|
| 2025 | Essendon | 32 | 5 | 2 | 1 | 13 | 10 | 23 | 6 | 10 | 0.4 | 0.2 | 2.6 | 2.0 | 4.6 | 1.2 | 2.0 | 0 |
| Career | | | 5 | 2 | 1 | 13 | 10 | 23 | 6 | 10 | 0.4 | 0.2 | 2.6 | 2.0 | 4.6 | 1.2 | 2.0 | 0 |
