= Desiree Miller =

Desiree Miller may refer to:

- Desiree Miller (Paralympian)
- Desiree Miller (rugby union)
