= Maia Davis =

New Zealand rugby sevens player

- Born: 2 April 2006 (age 20)
- Height: 173 cm (5 ft 8 in)
- School: Manukura

Rugby union career
- Position: Fullback
Provincial / State sides
Years	Team	Apps	(Points)
2023–	Manawatū Cyclones	12	(56)
Super Rugby
Years	Team	Apps	(Points)
2026–	Matatū	6	(14)
International career
Years	Team	Apps	(Points)
2026–	New Zealand	1	(0)
National sevens team
Years	Team		Comps
2025–	New Zealand		

Maia Davis (born 2 April 2006) is a New Zealand rugby sevens player. She is a member of the Black Ferns sevens team.

== Club career ==
She was educated at Manukura in Palmerston North, where she won the National First XV Top 4 Championship finals in September 2024.

She was still a student when she played for two seasons in the Farah Palmer Cup with the Manawatū Cyclones, along with two seasons with the New Zealand Under 18 Sevens team and a spell with the New Zealand Sevens Development team. In ten appearances for the Cyclones, Davis scored 10 tries and kicked 15 conversions, winning the 2024 Championship title with a 33-3 win over Otago. She was offered a contract with New Zealand women's national rugby sevens team in October 2024.

Rugby Sevens

She made her debut as an 18 year-old for Black Ferns sevens team at the 2025 Canada Sevens in Vancouver in 2025, part of the 2024-25 SVNS series, and scored her first senior international try in a 41-7 win over Fiji. New Zealand ultimately won the tournament. She was a member of the New Zealand team which won the Hong Kong Sevens in March 2025. She continued with the side, impressing while playing in the 2025-26 SVNS.

== Rugby career ==
Davis joined the Matatū squad for the 2026 Super Rugby Aupiki season, playing every game including their grand final loss.

International career

Davis was named in the Black Ferns squad for the 2026 WXV Global series. She made her international debut on September 19 against Scotland in Edinburgh.

== Personal life ==
She is from a rugby union family, with her parents Moana and Peter both representing Hawkes Bay at first-class level, with Peter making 87 appearances on the wing for them between 1983 and 1993.
