= Hannah King =

Hannah King may refer to:

- Hannah T. King, British-born American writer and pioneer
- Hannah King (rugby union), New Zealand rugby union player

== See also ==
- King Hannah, an English duo from Liverpool
