= Tara Turner =

NZ international rugby union player

- Born: 22 December 2003 (age 22) Whangārei, New Zealand
- Height: 157cm (5 ft 2 in)

Rugby union career
- Position: Scrum-Half
Provincial / State sides
Years	Team	Apps	(Points)
2022–2024	Northland	12	(29)
2025-	Counties Manukau	5	(5)
Super Rugby
Years	Team	Apps	(Points)
2023–	Blues Women	19	(10)
International career
Years	Team	Apps	(Points)
2026-	New Zealand	9	(5)

Tara Turner (born 22 December 2003) is a New Zealand rugby union player. She plays for the Blues in the Super Rugby Aupiki competition. She also plays for the Black Ferns internationally.

== Early life ==
Turner was born in Whangārei, New Zealand. She began playing rugby at Horahora before progressing to representative rugby with Northland.

== Rugby career ==
Turner made her Farah Palmer Cup debut for the Northland Kauri in 2022.

In 2023, she joined Blues Women for the Super Rugby Aupiki, playing off the bench as an outside back utility. She missed the 2024 season due to injury, before returning to the squad in 2025. She made the transition from fullback/first-five to the starting halfback in 2025. She has since started at halfback in their Super Rugby Aupiki championship wins in 2025 and 2026.

International career

On 22 March 2026, Turner was named in the Black Ferns squad for the Pacific Four series. She made her international debut on 11 April. On 19 September, in her first start at halfback for the Black Ferns, Turner won the player of the match medal in their test match vs Scotland in Edinburgh.
