= Vici-Rose Green =

NZ international rugby union player

- Born: 4 August 2002 (age 24)
- Height: 178 cm (5 ft 10 in)

Rugby union career
- Position(s): Hooker, Loose Forward
Provincial / State sides
| Years | Team | Apps | (Points) |
| 2022– | Waikato | 16 | (0) |
Super Rugby
| Years | Team | Apps | (Points) |
| 2024– | Chiefs Manawa | 10 | (10) |
International career
| Years | Team | Apps | (Points) |
| 2023 | Black Ferns XV | 1 | (0) |
| 2025– | New Zealand | 5 | (0) |
Medal record
Women's rugby union
Representing New Zealand
World Cup
| Bronze medal – third place | 2025 England | Team competition |

Vici-Rose Green (born 4 August 2002) is a New Zealand rugby union player. She plays Hooker for New Zealand internationally. She also plays for Chiefs Manawa in the Super Rugby Aupiki competition and provincially for Waikato.

== Rugby career ==
Green primarily plays as a Hooker, but also plays in the Loose Forward. In 2023, she played for the Black Ferns XV against the Manusina XV.

In 2024, she was a member of the Waikato side that won their second Farah Palmer Cup title when they beat Canterbury in the final at the FMG Stadium.

She returned to Chiefs Manawa for the 2025 Super Rugby Aupiki season.

Green made her test debut for the Black Ferns on 24 May 2025 at Albany, New Zealand against the United States in the final match of the Pacific Four Series.

She was named in the side again for their July series against the Black Ferns XV and the Wallaroos. She was later selected in the Black Ferns squad to the Women's Rugby World Cup in England.
