= Waiaria Ellis =

Australian rugby player

- Born: 11 September 2007 (age 19)
- Height: 1.60 m (5 ft 3 in)
- Weight: 50 kg (110 lb)
- School: Castle Hill High School
- Notable relative: Ben Ellis (father)

Rugby union career
- Position: Winger
- Current team: NSW Waratahs
Super Rugby
| Years | Team | Apps | (Points) |
| 2024– | NSW Waratahs | | (0) |
International career
| Years | Team | Apps | (Points) |
| 2025– | Australia | 3 | (0) |

Waiaria Ellis (born 11 September 2007) is an Australian rugby union footballer who plays as a winger for NSW Waratahs.

== Early life ==
She played rugby league, Oztag and touch football in her youth, before representing Australia at gymnastics in 2022. That year, she played her first game of 15-a-side rugby union. She attended Castle Hill High School in Sydney.

== Club career ==
She plays domestic rugby union for NSW Waratahs, featuring for the club as a 16-year-old in 2024, making her debut in the opening round of the Super Rugby women's competition in March 2024 against the ACT Brumbies, equalling the age record of teammate Caitlyn Halse as their youngest ever player.

== International career ==
In 2023 she played for the Australian Schoolgirl rugby sevens team. In September 2024, she was calledup to play for Australia A against Samoa as a 16-year-old.

She was called up to the senior Australia women's national rugby union team in July 2025. She made her international debut against New Zealand on 12 July, becoming the second youngest debutant in the Wallaroos history at 17 years and 305 days, behind only Caitlyn Halse.

She was named in the Wallaroos squad for the 2025 Women's Rugby World Cup in England.

== Personal life ==
She is the daughter of rugby player Ben Ellis. Her sister Ruby-Jean Kennard-Ellis is a rugby league player, for Parramatta NRLW. She is of Māori descent, and is from the Ngāti Tūwharetoa iwi.
