= Veisinia Mahutariki-Fakalelu =

NZ international rugby union player

- Born: 24 November 2004 (age 21)
- Height: 178 cm (5 ft 10 in)

Rugby union career
- Position: Prop
Provincial / State sides
Years	Team	Apps	(Points)
2024–	Waikato	8	(30)
Super Rugby
Years	Team	Apps	(Points)
2025–	Chiefs Manawa	10	(5)
International career
Years	Team	Apps	(Points)
2025–	New Zealand	14	(5)
Medal record
Women's rugby union
Representing New Zealand
World Cup
Bronze medal – third place	2025 England	Team competition

Veisinia Mahutariki-Fakalelu (born 24 November 2004) is a New Zealand rugby union player. She plays at Prop for New Zealand internationally. She also plays for Chiefs Manawa in the Super Rugby Aupiki competition and provincially for Waikato.

== Rugby career ==
Mahutariki-Fakalelu transitioned from her original position as a Loose Forward to Prop, at the suggestion of her Waikato coach.

She was a member of the Waikato side that won their second Farah Palmer Cup title when they beat Canterbury in the final at the FMG Stadium in 2024.

She was impressive for Waikato during the 2024 season and was selected for Chiefs Manawa for their 2025 Super Rugby Aupiki campaign.

Mahutariki-Fakalelu was named in the Black Ferns squad for the 2025 Pacific Four Series. She made her test debut for New Zealand on 24 May 2025 at Albany, New Zealand against the United States.

She was called up to the side again for their July series against the Black Ferns XV and the Wallaroos. In July 2025, she was named in the Black Ferns side to the Women's Rugby World Cup in England.
