= Kennedy Tukuafu =

New Zealand rugby union player

Kennedy Tukuafu MNZM
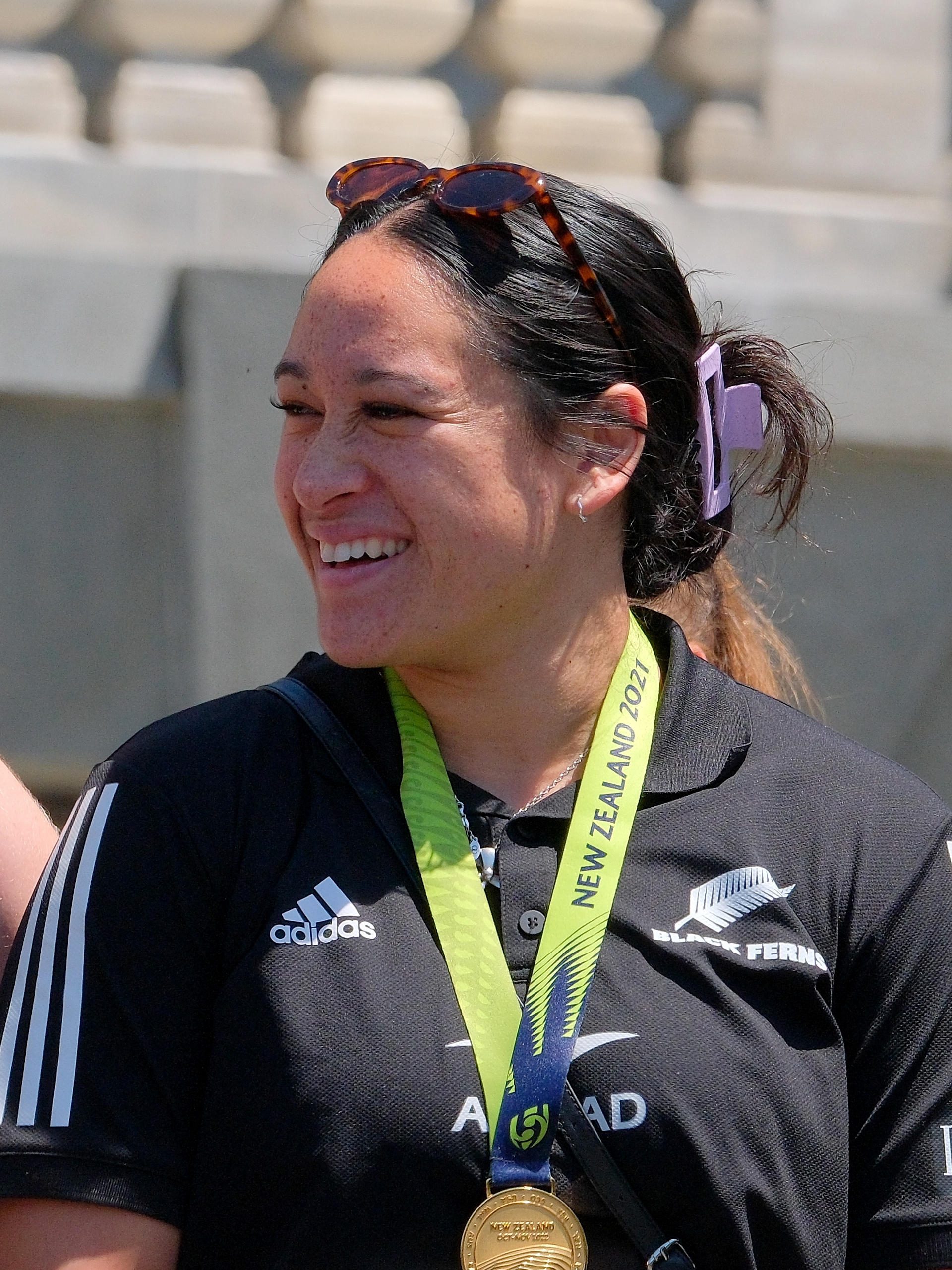
- Kennedy Tukuafu in 2022
- Full name: Kennedy Wailer Simon
- Born: 1 October 1996 (age 30)
- Height: 1.70 m (5 ft 7 in)
- Weight: 80 kg (176 lb)

Rugby union career
- Position: Loose forward
Provincial / State sides
Years	Team	Apps	(Points)
2013–2023	Waikato	37	(35)
Super Rugby
Years	Team	Apps	(Points)
2021–	Chiefs Manawa	22	(40)
International career
Years	Team	Apps	(Points)
2019–	New Zealand	34	(25)
Medal record
Women's rugby union
Representing New Zealand
Rugby World Cup
Gold medal – first place	2021 New Zealand	Team competition
Bronze medal – third place	2025 England	Team competition

Kennedy Wailer Tukuafu MNZM (née Simon; born 1 October 1996) is a New Zealand rugby union player. She is a loose forward and plays for the Black Ferns internationally and was a member of their 2021 Rugby World Cup champion squad. She also plays for Chiefs Manawa in the Super Rugby Aupiki competition and represents Waikato provincially.

== Rugby career ==
Tukuafu made her provincial debut for Waikato in 2013 against Otago Spirit. She made her test debut for the New Zealand women's national side, the Black Ferns, against the United States in 2019.

=== 2020–22 ===
In 2020, she was awarded the international and Farah Palmer Cup player of the year by the New Zealand Rugby Players' Association at the New Zealand Rugby awards.

Tukuafu was part of the inaugural Chiefs Manawa side that played in the first women's Super Rugby match in New Zealand at Eden Park in 2021.

She was named in the Black Ferns squad for the August test series against the Wallaroos for the 2022 Laurie O'Reilly Cup. She made the Black Ferns 32-player squad for the 2021 Rugby World Cup.

=== 2023 ===
In 2023, She was selected as co-captain of the Black Ferns squad, with Ruahei Demant, for the Pacific Four Series and O’Reilly Cup. In July, she started in her sides 21–52 victory over Canada at the Pacific Four Series in Ottawa.

In July 2025, she was named in the Black Ferns side to the Women's Rugby World Cup in England.

== Honours and awards ==
In the 2023 King's Birthday and Coronation Honours, Tukuafu was appointed a Member of the New Zealand Order of Merit, for services to rugby.
