= Laura Bayfield =

New Zealand rugby union footballer (born 1999)

- Born: 5 March 1999 (age 27)
- Height: 177 cm (5 ft 10 in)

Rugby union career
- Position: Lock
Provincial / State sides
Years	Team	Apps	(Points)
2022	Tasman	3	(5)
2023–	Canterbury	16	(15)
Super Rugby
Years	Team	Apps	(Points)
2024–	Matatū	12	(5)
International career
Years	Team	Apps	(Points)
2025–	New Zealand	6	(0)
Medal record
Women's rugby union
Representing New Zealand
World Cup
Bronze medal – third place	2025 England	Team competition

Laura Bayfield (born 5 March 1999) is a New Zealand rugby union player. She plays for Matatū in the Super Rugby Aupiki competition. She made her international debut for New Zealand in 2025.

== Rugby career ==
Bayfield made her Farah Palmer Cup debut for Tasman in 2022. She debuted for Canterbury in 2023 and was also selected for the inaugural Black Ferns XVs team that year.

In 2024, she joined Matatū for the Super Rugby Aupiki.

In July 2025, she played for the Black Ferns XVs in their trial match against the Black Ferns in Whangārei. She was later called up into the Black Ferns side for the O’Reilly Cup match against the Wallaroos. She made her international debut on 12 July in Wellington.

On 25 July 2025, she was named in the Black Ferns side to the Women's Rugby World Cup in England.

== Personal life ==
In 2017, Bayfield joined the New Zealand Army after leaving Mount Albert Grammar School. She is a qualified engineer and bridge builder. She serves as a captain in the New Zealand Army's 3rd Field and Emergency Response Squadron based at Burnham Military Base.
