= Amy du Plessis =

New Zealand rugby union player

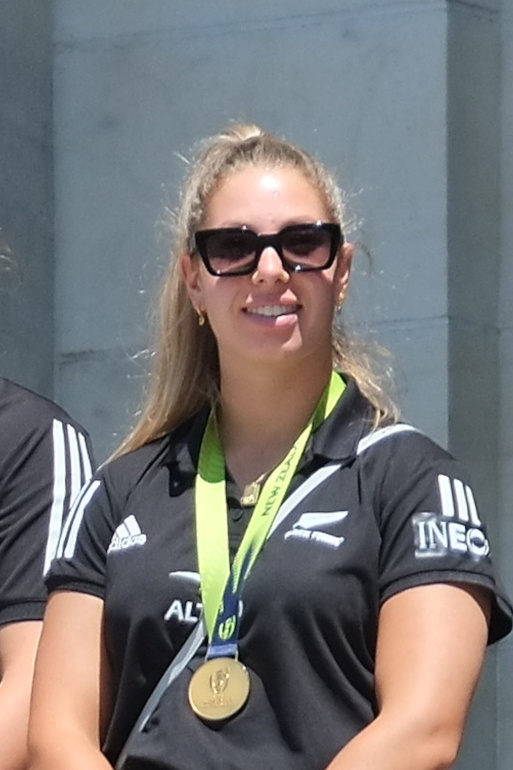
- Du Plessis in 2022
- Born: 7 July 1999 (age 27) Newcastle, KwaZulu-Natal, South Africa
- Height: 1.69 m (5 ft 7 in)
- Weight: 73 kg (161 lb)

Rugby union career
- Position: Centre
Provincial / State sides
Years	Team	Apps	(Points)
2018–2020	Otago	15	(45)
2021–2023	Canterbury	18	(40)
Super Rugby
Years	Team	Apps	(Points)
2022–	Matatū	27	(30)
International career
Years	Team	Apps	(Points)
2022–	New Zealand	34	(65)
Medal record
Representing New Zealand
Women's rugby union
Rugby World Cup
Gold medal – first place	2021 New Zealand	Team competition
Bronze medal – third place	2025 England	Team competition

Amy du Plessis (born 7 July 1999) is a South African born, New Zealand rugby union player. She plays for Matatū in the Super Rugby Aupiki competition and for Canterbury provincially. She also plays for the Black Ferns internationally and was a member of their 2021 Rugby World Cup champion squad.

== Early life ==
Du Plessis was born in Newcastle, KwaZulu-Natal, South Africa. Her family immigrated and settled in Invercargill when she was seven. She was a key part of Southland Girls' High School's rugby success. She helped win their first national Top 4 final in 2016.

== Rugby career ==
Du Plessis made her debut for Otago in 2018. She played for the Probables against the Possibles in the Black Ferns trial in 2020. She made her Black Ferns debut off the bench on 4 November 2020 against the New Zealand Barbarians in West Auckland. She started in the second match.

In 2021, she appeared for the Black Ferns 15s at the Takiwhitu Tūturu Pure Sevens tournament in Hataitai Park, Wellington. She was selected for the Matatū squad for the inaugural season of Super Rugby Aupiki in 2022.

Du Plessis was named in the Black Ferns squad for the 2022 Pacific Four Series. She made her international debut for the Black Ferns on 12 June 2022 against Canada in West Auckland. She was reselected in the squad for the August test series against Australia for the Laurie O'Reilly Cup.

Du Plessis was selected for the Black Ferns 2021 Rugby World Cup 32-player squad. New Zealand won their sixth World title after narrowly beating England 34–31 in the final.

Du Plessis returned for her second season with Matatū for the 2023 Super Rugby Aupiki competition.

On 8 July 2023, she scored a brace of tries in the Black Ferns 21–52 victory over Canada at the Pacific Four Series in Ottawa. She was chosen as the Mastercard Woman of the Match for her performance.

In July 2025, she was named in the Black Ferns squad to the Women's Rugby World Cup. On 13 September, she was ruled out for the rest of the World Cup due to a shoulder injury sustained in the pool match against Spain.
