= Ruahei Demant =

New Zealand rugby union player

Ruahei Demant MNZM
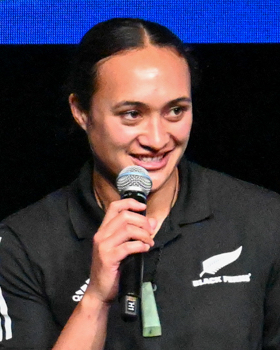
- Demant in 2022
- Full name: Devon Ruahei Demant
- Born: 21 April 1995 (age 31)
- Height: 1.69 m (5 ft 7 in)
- Weight: 81 kg (179 lb)
- Notable relative: Kiritapu Demant (sister)

Rugby union career
- Position(s): First five-eighth Second five-eighth Centre
Senior career
Years	Team	Apps	(Points)
2025–	Bristol Bears		(0)
Provincial / State sides
Years	Team	Apps	(Points)
2013–	Auckland	59	(304)
Super Rugby
Years	Team	Apps	(Points)
2021–	Blues Women	28	(96)
International career
Years	Team	Apps	(Points)
2018–	New Zealand	58	(143)
Medal record
Representing New Zealand
Women's rugby union
Rugby World Cup
Gold medal – first place	2021 New Zealand	Team competition
Bronze medal – third place	2025 England	Team competition

Devon Ruahei Demant MNZM (born 21 April 1995) is a New Zealand rugby union player. She made her debut for the New Zealand national women's team, the Black Ferns, against Australia in 2018. A utility back, Demant plays as a first five-eighth, second five-eighth or centre. She was named 2022 World Rugby player of the year.

Demant was co-captain of the Black Ferns team that won the 2021 Rugby World Cup.

== Early life ==
Ruahei Devon Demant was born on 21 April 1995. As she was born on the day Team New Zealand won the 1995 Louis Vuitton Cup she acquired the nicknamed Lu. Her father was a commercial cray fisherman. She has five siblings, among whom are sisters Erina and Kiritapu. She spent her childhood in the small coastal settlement of Ōmāio, in an area known as Little Awanui, in the eastern Bay of Plenty. Demant and her younger sister Kiritapu grew up playing soccer with boys because there were no girls teams locally. They also played netball, basketball, hockey, touch rugby and rugby league.

Demant and her siblings grew up speaking Māori as their first language at home. They first attended the Tokamaii Kohanga Reo, before attending Te Kura Mana Maori o Maraenui school, near Opotoki, where all the lessons are in Maori.

In 2007 just before her 12th birthday her parents sold their crayfish quota and moved the family north to Leigh near Warkworth where Demant initially attended Mahurangi Christian School in Snells Beach, which assisted her in the transition from te reo into an English-speaking teaching system. Here she was made the Year 8 head prefect. She continued her education at Mahurangi College in Warkworth, where in 2013 she was the school's head girl. At the 2010 Ngā Manu Kōrero National Secondary School Speech Contest 15 year old Demant finished second overall in the junior section and was awarded the Dame Whina Cooper Trophy for the best performance by a girl in the junior section.

After competing her high school education, Demant moved to Auckland to study law at Auckland University.

== Rugby career ==
Encouraged by their mother Vikki, Demant and her sister Kiritapu played touch rugby for Mahurangi, Harbour, Sharks and in the Whangteau competition. They were coached by former All Black Glen Osborne and his wife, Kylee. Both were selected for the New Zealand under 15 girls team. The sisters also played basketball, football, netball, rugby sevens and fifteen-a-side rugby at secondary school.

While playing for Mahurangi College senior girls touch team, Demant suffered what an ACL (anterior cruciate ligament) injury to her knee. As a result, she was forced to miss her final touch tournament with the team.

Demant also began playing fifteen-a-side rugby at Mahurangi and loved it but while the school was able to field 15 players in her first year, it dropped to 10 in the second which was insufficient to field a team. With limited opportunities for girls to play rugby in their region Demant and Kiritapu became aware that the College Rifles Rugby Club in Remuera, Auckland was a supportive environment for girls and women's rugby. Upon arriving for their first training run Demant later recalled “I remember Dad drove Kiritapu and me to our first practice and we saw these huge Tongan props approaching the car. We begged Dad to take us home, but he refused.”

In 2012 during her final year at high school Demant was selected at the age of 17 for the Auckland Storm rugby team, which went on to win that year's Farah Palmer Cup. Her rugby was curtailed early in the 2013 season, when 10 minutes into a game against Taranaki she ruptured the anterior cruciate ligament (ACL) in her left knee. Following reconstruction she returned the team for the following season, during which the Auckland Storm again won the Farah Palmer Cup.

In 2015 while competing at a sevens tournament in Mt Manganui she ruptured her ACL in her right knee. She returned in time to assist the Auckland Storm in once again winning the Farah Palmer Cup. When she was 20 Demant while playing in the first sevens tournament of the summer once again damaged the ACl in her left knee, making it her third such injury.

=== Debuts for the Black Ferns ===
At the age of 23 Demant made her debut for Black Ferns at first-five eighth in Sydney against Australia on 18 August 2018 which the team won 33–11. A week later she was in the team which won, 45–17 against Australia at Eden Park. three further games followed in 2018, one against the US in Chicago and two games against France, one at Toulon and the other at Grenoble, all being won by the Black Ferns. Demant's performance in the domestic season saw her once again selected for the Black Ferns, this time playing in games in San Diego in July 2019 against Canada, the US, France and England (beaten 28–13). She then played in finished with back to back games for the Black Ferns in August against Australia, both of which were won by the Black Ferns 47–10 in Perth and 37–6 in Auckland. In the first of the two games Demant scored a 40-metre individual try. Her 2019 international season finished with playing for the Barbarians women's team which beat Wales 29–15 at Cardiff on 30 November 2019. With Covid preventing international travel Demant played for the Black Ferns in their only two games of the season, both against the New Zealand Barbarians.

=== Super rugby ===
Demant played for the Blues against the Chiefs in the first-ever women's Super Rugby match in New Zealand on 1 May 2021. On 3 November 2021, She was named in the Blues squad for the inaugural Super Rugby Aupiki competition. She was named in the Blues starting line-up for their first game against Matatū, they won 21–10. She also started in their 0–35 thrashing by the Chiefs Manawa in the final round.

=== 2021 Black Ferns northern tour ===
Demant played in all games of the Blacks Ferns disastrous tour to the northern hemisphere in October and November 2021 which saw them lose all their games against England and France.

=== 2022 Pacific Fours ===
With existing captain Les Elder unavailable due to injury Demant was selected in May 2022 to captain the Black Ferns squad for the 2022 Pacific Four Series.

=== 2022 Laurie Reilly Cup ===
For the August test series against Australia for the Laurie O'Reilly Cup Demant was once again selected to lead the Blacks Ferns, but with Kennedy Simon who was returning from injury as her co-captain.

=== 2021 Rugby World Cup ===
Demant was selected to captain the Black Ferns 32-player squad for the 2021 Rugby World Cup. At Demant's request Kennedy Simon was made her co-captain.

Led by Demant on the field in five of the six games New Zealand won all of its games in the competition, including the final. Demant scored a total of four tries throughout the competition and was named the player of the match of the final.

=== 2023 season ===
Demant was given a playing contract by New Zealand Rugby for the 2023 season. She was selected as co-captain of the Black Ferns squad, with Kennedy Simon, for the Pacific Four Series and O’Reilly Cup. In July, she scored a try in her sides 21–52 victory over Canada at the Pacific Series in Ottawa.

=== 2025 ===
In July 2025, she was named in the Black Ferns squad to the Women's Rugby World Cup in England. In November 2025, it was confirmed that she had joined Premiership Women's Rugby team Bristol Bears Women on a four-month deal.

=== 2026 ===
She returned from the United Kingdom to co-captain New Zealand in the 2026 Pacific Four Series. In the opening game of the series which was against the United States at Heart Health Park, Sacramento on 11 April 2026 she became the longest-serving New Zealand fifteen-a-side women's captain with 36 matches in that role.

== Honours and awards ==
In June 2014, Demant was awarded a Moana Ngarimu VC Scholarship to assist with her studies. It was presented in the Grand Hall of Parliament at an occasion attended by the Governor General Sir Jerry Mateparae, Willie Apiata, VC and Minister of Education, Hekia Parata.

At the 2022 World Rugby Awards, Demant was named Women's 15s Player of the Year. Also in 2022, she was named Kelvin R Tremain Memorial Player of the Year, Tom French Māori Player of the Year, and Black Ferns Player of the Year.

In the 2023 King's Birthday and Coronation Honours, Demant was appointed a Member of the New Zealand Order of Merit, for services to rugby.

== Personal life ==
Demant is of Ngāti Awa, Te Whānau-ā-Apanui and Te Whakatōhea descent. To support herself while she studied law and commerce studies at the University of Auckland Demant worked full-time at an immigration consultancy firm.

After completing a BA/LLB majoring in Sociology and Law at the University of Auckland in 2020 Demant worked at the North Shore District Court as a Deputy Registrar in the Judge Alone Trials Team. She left to practice law at the firm of Dentons Kensington Swan in Auckland. Her younger sister Kiritapu was also in the Black Ferns, having made her debut in 2015.

She and her sister Kiritapu were the fifth pair of sisters to play for the Black Ferns and the first Māori sisters. Her relative Te Whetu Werohia Tipiwai composed the Black Ferns haka Ko Uhia Mai.

Awards
Preceded by Sarah Hirini	Tom French Memorial; Māori rugby union player of the year 2022	Succeeded by Aaron Smith
