= Hurricanes Poua =

NZ women's rugby union team, based in Wellington

- Union: New Zealand Rugby
- Founded: 2021; 5 years ago
- Location: Wellington, New Zealand
- Region: Manawatu; Wellington
- Coach: Hayden Triggs
- Captain(s): Te Rauoriwa Gapper; Samantha Taylor
- Most appearances: Iritana Hohaia (23)
- Top scorer: Renee Holmes (71)
- Most tries: Ayesha Leti-I'iga (8)
- League: Super Rugby Aupiki
- 2026: 3rd Overall

Official website
- www.hurricanes.co.nz

Hurricanes Poua are a New Zealand women's professional rugby union team based in Wellington, New Zealand that competes in the Super Rugby Aupiki competition. Hurricanes Poua cover a similar catchment area as the Hurricanes including the Farah Palmer Cup teams of Manawatū, and Wellington but excluding Hawke's Bay.

== History ==
=== Team name ===
On 7 February 2022, the Hurricanes revealed the new name of their women's team, Hurricanes Poua. The new team identity was developed collaboratively by a select committee that included past and present Black Ferns. They drew from preexisting Māori narratives, the team's identity has a connection to (almost all of, excluding Hawke's Bay) both the Hurricanes region and their people. The name Poua was derived from the Māori narrative of Ranginui (sky father) and Papatūānuku (earthmother).

=== Super Rugby Aupiki announced ===
New Zealand Rugby announced that an elite women's competition, consisting of four teams, called Super Rugby Aupiki was confirmed for March 2022. The competition would run for four weeks and the women would be paid for their participation.

=== Inaugural squad and coaching team named ===
Hurricanes Poua released a list of players that had signed for the inaugural Super Rugby Aupiki season. Wesley Clarke was appointed as Head Coach of Hurricanes Poua. Former Black Fern, Victoria Grant, and Manawatu Cyclones Head Coach, Fusi Feaunati, were named as his assistant coaches. Sarah Hirini was named to captain the side for their maiden season.

=== Inaugural season ===
The Hurricanes Poua were forced to withdraw from their opening match against the Blues Women due to COVID cases and isolation requirements within the team. The teams shared the competition points as the match had been cancelled. After missing out on their opening game, Hurricanes Poua finally got their much awaited debut. They faced Chiefs Manawa in the second round of competition but were beaten 29–8. Hurricanes Poua recorded their first win in the final round after defeating Matatū 18–6.

=== 2023 ===
Victoria Grant was appointed as the new Head Coach of Hurricanes Poua for the 2023 Sky Super Rugby Aupiki season. Grant was absent for the 2024 Super Rugby Aupiki season and was expected to return as head coach in 2025. Ngatai Walker will be head coach for the 2024 season.

=== 2024 haka incident ===
In early March 2024, the Hurricanes Poua attracted media attention after they used an altered haka (ceremonial dance) before a match with the Chiefs Manawa on 2 March. The haka contained the Māori language line "karetao o te Kāwana kakiwhero" or "puppets of this redneck government," which referred to the incumbent National-led coalition government. The haka also made references to Toitu te Tiriti, a political movement that had criticised the Government's policies towards the Māori language and perceived breaches of the Treaty of Waitangi. The Poua lost 46–24 to the Chiefs Manawa.

Following media attention, Hurricanes Poua prop and haka leader Leilani Perese claimed that the Hurricanes' management had approved the altered haka but this was disputed by Hurricanes chief executive Avan Lee, who said he was not consulted. Lee announced that the Hurricanes would apologise to the Government. New Zealand Rugby also announced that it would investigate the matter, while the New Zealand Rugby Players Association (NZRPA) confirmed it would speak with the Hurricanes Poua team members. The Hurricanes Poua were criticised by Deputy Prime Minister Winston Peters and ACT party leader David Seymour, who said that the team was more interested in politics than in winning the match. By contrast, Kaihaka (performer) and Māori language expert Mataia Keepa defended the Hurricanes Poua, stating that it was "absolutely humbling ... and absolutely heroic" to witness the team's haka.

=== 2025 ===
On 30 October 2025, Hayden Triggs was named the new Head Coach of Hurricanes Poua for the 2026 Super Rugby Aupiki season. Super Rugby New Zealand's official website states the franchise area of the Poua is the same as the Hurricanes with the exception of Hawke's Bay.

== Current squad ==
The Hurricanes Poua squad for the 2026 Super Rugby Aupiki season is:

2026 Hurricanes Poua squad
**Props**: (New Zealand) Faythe Finau; (New Zealand) **Angel Mulu**; (New Zealand) **Krystal Murray**; (New Zealand) Mo'omo'oga Palu; (Canada) **Brooke Rempel** (Note: Rempel wasn’t named in the original Hurricanes Poua squad, but was announced in the side for Round 2.); (New Zealand) Ngano Tavake; **Hookers**: (New Zealand) Tegan Hollows; (New Zealand) Keiana Roffey ^{ST} (Note: Roffey wasn't named in the original Hurricanes Poua squad, but was announced in the side for Round 1.); (New Zealand) Jordyn Tihore (Note: Tihore has been signed as an utility forward, but has played most of her provincial games at hooker.); (New Zealand) Valini Vaka; **Locks**: (New Zealand) Stacey Niao; (New Zealand) Samantha Taylor **(cc)**; (New Zealand) Brianna Wallace	**Loose forwards**: (New Zealand) Neve Anglesey; (New Zealand) Keelah Bodle (Note: Bodle has been signed as a hybrid player; she has played most of her provincial games as a flanker and a few on the wing.); (New Zealand) Anahera Hamahona; (New Zealand) Greer Muir; (New Zealand) Lily Murray-Wihongi; (New Zealand) **Layla Sae** (injured) (Note: Ruled out for the season through injury ahead of the season.); **Halfbacks (scrum-halves)**: (New Zealand) Litia Bulicakau (Note: Bulicakau wasn’t named in the original Hurricanes Poua squad, but was announced in the side for Round 2.); (New Zealand) Paige Lush; (Ireland) **Molly Scuffil-McCabe**; **First five-eighths (fly-halves)**: (New Zealand) Te Rauoriwa Gapper **(cc)**; (New Zealand) **Renee Holmes**	**Midfielders (centres)**: (New Zealand) Leilani Hakiwai; (New Zealand) Kokako Raki; (New Zealand) Hinemaringi Scott; (New Zealand) Rangimarie Sturmey; **Outside backs**: (New Zealand) Wikitoria Viljoen; (New Zealand) Fia Laikong; (New Zealand) Arene Landon-Lane; (New Zealand) **Ayesha Leti-I'iga**; (New Zealand) Keira Su'a-Smith; (New Zealand) **Iritana Hohaia**
(cc) denotes co-captain. **Bold** denotes internationally capped players.^{ST} denotes a short-term signing. denotes an injured player. Source:

== Coaches and management ==
- Head Coach: Hayden Triggs
- Assistant Coach: Emma Jensen
- Assistant Manager: Chris Day
- Physiotherapist: Sian Meffan
- Performance Analyst: Jack Baker
- Strength & Conditioning Coach: Jack Kovacs

== Captain ==
Captain	Period	Ref
Sarah Hirini	2022	
Jackie Patea-Fereti	2023–2025	
Te Rauoriwa Gapper	2026	
Samantha Taylor	2026	

== Coaches ==
Hurricanes Poua coaches by date, matches and win percentage*
Coach	Period	G	W	D	L	%
Wesley Clarke	2022	3	1	1	1	50%
Victoria Grant	2023	5	2	0	3	40%
Ngatai Walker	2024	6	1	0	5	16.66%
Fusi Feaunati	2025	6	0	0	6	0.00%
Hayden Triggs	2026–	0	0	0	0	0.00%
Totals (2022–present)^{*}		20	4	1	15	20%
Updated to: 5 April 2025

Notes:

^* Official Super Rugby Aupiki competition matches only, including finals.
