= 2025 Women's Rugby World Cup warm-up matches =

In June, July and August 2025, several women's rugby union national teams played matches in preparation for the 2025 Women's Rugby World Cup which will be hosted in England.

== Matches ==
=== June ===
14 June 2025
14:30 BRT (UTC-3)

Brazil	58–7	Colombia
Try: Barth (2) 2' m, 28' m Tenorio 8' m Lopes de Souza (2) 11' m, 36' m Martins 31' c Coimbra 39' c Ísis Carvalho 41' c Lima 54' m Saccomanno 79' c Con: Kochhann (3/9) 32', 40', 42'; Tenorio (1/1) 80'	Report	Try: Barajas 62' c Con: Lopera (1/1) 63'

Estádio Nicolau Alayon, São Paulo
Referee: Federico Longobard (Argentina)

28 June 2025
11:30 AEST (UTC+10)

Australia A	50–22	Samoa

Viking Park, Canberra
Referee: Ella Goldsmith (Australia)

=== 5 July ===
5 July 2025
13:05 NZST (UTC+12)

New Zealand	45–12	Black Ferns XV

Okara Park, Whangārei

5 July 2025
12:30 SAST (UTC+2)

South Africa	20–50	Canada
Try: Cilliers 43'; Dolf 61' m Solontsi 69' m Con: Cilliers (1/3) 43'; Pen: Cilliers (1/1) 14'	Report	Try: Menin 5' c Bermudez 16' m Symonds (2) 28' c, 76' c Royer 33' c Corrigan (2) 45' m, 56' c Crossley 79' m Con: Schell (5/8) 6', 29', 34', 57', 77'

Loftus Versfeld Stadium, Pretoria
Referee: Clara Munarini (Italy)

=== 12 July ===
12 July 2025
16:30 NZST (UTC+12)

New Zealand	37–12	Australia
Try: Woodman-Wickliffe (3) 2' m, 34' m, 57' m Demant 47' m Miller 51' c Brunt 63' m Tui 67' m Con: Holmes (1/5) 52'	Report	Try: Caslick 5' c Kavoa 79' m Con: Moleka (1/1) 6'

Sky Stadium, Wellington
Referee: Kat Roche (United States)

12 July 2025
12:30 SAST (UTC+2)

South Africa	5–33	Canada
Try: Malinga 44' m	Report	Try: Kassil 4' c Boag 31' c Norsten 54' m Beukeboom 73' c Scurfield 77' c Con: Schell (2/3) 5', 32'; Grant (2/2) 74', 78'

Nelson Mandela Bay Stadium, Gqeberha
Referee: Precious Pazani (Zimbabwe)

12 July 2025
15:00 BRT (UTC-3)

Brazil	5–33	Netherlands
Try: Lopes de Souza 64' m	Report	Try: Prins (2) 17' m, 56' m Holland (2) 30' c, 42' c Morauw 40' c Con: Touw (3/5) 32', 41', 43'

Estádio Municipal Du Cambusano, Jacareí
Referee: Emma Gallagher (Canada)

=== 19 July ===
19 July 2025
18:00 JST (UTC+09)

Japan	32–19	Spain
Try: Komaki (2) 8' m, 17' m Taniguchi (3) 67' c, 72' c, 79' m Con: Yamamoto (2/3) 68', 72'; Pen: Otsuka (1/1) 36'	Report	Try: Castelo 32' m Argudo 49' c Pérez 58' c Con: Argudo (2/3) 50', 59'

Mikuni World Stadium, Kitakyushu,
Referee: Lauren Jenner (Italy)

19 July 2025
11:00 BRT (UTC-3)

Brazil	22–0	Netherlands
Try: Henwood Lima 29' m Vergara 68' c Moreira (2) 71' m, 79' m Con: Kochhann (1/4) 68'	Report

Estádio Nicolau Alayon, São Paulo
Referee: Kristine Lovatt (Canada)

19 July 2025
14:05 EDT (UTC-4)

United States	31–24	Fiji
Try: Rogers 2' c Jarrell-Searcy 8' c Coulibaly 26' c Johnson 30' m Henrich 65' m Con: Hawkins (3/5) 3', 9', 27'	Report	Try: Nakesa 12' c Fisher 35' c Neihamu 45' c Con: Vueti (3/3) 13', 36', 46'; Pen: Vueti (1/1) 61'

Audi Field, Washington, D.C.
Referee: Sara Cox (England)

=== 25–26 July ===
25 July 2025
19:30 CEST (UTC+2)

Italy	34–29	Scotland
Try: D'Inca (3) 7' m, 12' m, 64' c Fedrighi 20' m Muzzo 40' m Rigoni 60' c Con: Sillari (2/5) 61', 65'	Report	Try: Skeldon 28' m Nelson 50' m Gallagher (2) 57' c, 80' c Martin 70' m Con: Nelson (2/5) 58', 80'

Stadio Luigi Zaffanella, Viadana
Referee: Aurélie Groizeleau (France)

26 July 2025
14:00 AEST (UTC+10)

Australia	12–21	Wales
Try: Codey 8' c Tuinakauvadra 40' m Con: Miller (1/2) 9'	Report	Try: Metcalfe (2) 20' c, 37' c Dallavalle 42' c Con: Bevan (3/3) 21', 38', 43'

Ballymore Stadium, Brisbane
Referee: Maggie Cogger-Orr (New Zealand)

26 July 2025
17:05 JST (UTC+09)

Japan	30–19	Spain
Try: Kagawa (2) 13' m, 26' m Nagata 46' c Matsumura 60' m Kokaji 70' m Con: Yamamoto (1/5) 47'; Pen: Yamamoto (1/1) 57'	Report	Try: Rementería 51' m Jou 65' c Alameda 75' c Con: Argudo (2/3) 66', 76'

Chichibunomiya Rugby Stadium, Tokyo
Referee: Lauren Jenner (Italy)

26 July 2025
17:00 SAST (UTC+2)

South Africa	26–34	Black Ferns XV
Try: Hele (2); Latsha; Mdliki; Con: Cilliers (3)	Report	Try: Paul; Teneti (3); Kolose; Mete-Renata; Con: Nepia (2)

Athlone Stadium, Cape Town
Referee: Zoë Naudé (South Africa)

=== 1–2 August ===
1 August 2025
19:00 AEST (UTC+10)

Australia	36–5	Wales
Try: Stewart 16' c Moleka 31' c Amosa 40' c Tuinakauvadra (2) 45' m, 50' m Marsters 76' m Con: Wood (3/5) 17', 32', 40+1'	Report	Try: Joyce-Butchers 27' m

North Sydney Oval, Sydney
Referee: Natarsha Ganley (New Zealand)

1 August 2025
19:00 ET (UTC-4)

Canada	42–10	United States
Try: Penalty try 27'; Hunt 40' c Senft 43' c DeMerchant 63' c Symonds 65' c Nelson 74' c Con: de Goede (4/4) 40', 44', 64', 66'; Schell (1/1) 75'	Report	Try: Tafuna 2' c Con: Hawkins (1/1) 3'; Pen: Hawkins (1/1) 31'

TD Place Stadium, Ottawa
Attendance: 11,453
Referee: Ella Goldsmith (Australia)

Notes:

- Attendance of 11,453 was the largest crowd ever for a standalone women's rugby match in North America.

2 August 2025
14:00 IST (UTC+1)

Ireland	27–21	Scotland
Try: McGrath 35' m Deely 37' c McGillivray 46' m O'Dowd 68' m Nic a Bháird 77' m Con: O'Brien (1/3) 38'	Report	Try: Thomson 16' c Scott 22' c Orr 64' c Con: Thomson (3/3) 17', 23', 65'

Musgrave Park, Cork
Referee: Clara Munarini (Italy)

2 August 2025
15:00 BST (UTC+1)

England	97–7	Spain
Try: Feaunati 5' c M. Packer 7' c Rowland (3) 10' m, 27' m, 44' m Breach 17' m Bern (2) 31' c, 42' c Shekells 39' c Campion 48' c Sing 56' c Campbell 59' c Botterman 66' c Dow 76' c Jones 80' c Con: Harrison (6/10) 6', 8', 32', 40', 43', 49'; Sing (5/5) 57', 60', 67', 77', 80+1'	Report	Try: Peña 53' c Con: Argudo (1/1) 54'

Welford Road, Leicester
Attendance: 5,286
Referee: Aurélie Groizeleau (France)

2 August 2025
17:00 SAST (UTC+2)

South Africa	41–24	Black Ferns XV
Try: Malinga; Dolf; Janse van Rensburg; Ngxingolo; Gwala; Makua; Hanekom; Con: Janse van Rensburg (3)	Report	Try: Teneti; Greenway; Connor; McGregor; Con: King (2)

Athlone Stadium, Cape Town
Referee: Aimee Barrett-Theron (South Africa)

=== 9 August ===
9 August 2025
12:00 BST (UTC+1)

Ireland	26–47	Canada
Try: Parsons (2) 19' c, 70' c McGann (2) 58' m, 61' c Con: O'Brien (3/4) 20', 62', 71'	Report	Try: Symonds (2) 9' c, 24' c Pelletier 13' c Menin 32' m Farries 40' c Schell 54' c de Goede 79' c Con: de Goede (6/7) 10', 14', 25', 40+1', 55', 80'

Ravenhill Stadium, Belfast
Referee: Aurélie Groizeleau (France)

9 August 2025
19:30 CEST (UTC+2)

Italy	33–15	Japan
	Report

Stadio San Michele, Calvisano
Referee: Sara Cox (England)

9 August 2025
21:10 CEST (UTC+2)

France	6–40	England
Pen: Bourgeois (2/2) 35', 43'	Report	Try: Talling 3' m Cokayne 15' c Muir 37' c Jones 47' c Atkin-Davies (2) 74' c, 77' c Con: Harrison (5/6) 16', 38', 48', 75', 78'

Stade Guy Boniface, Mont de Marsan
Referee: Aimee Barrett-Theron (South Africa)

A test match between Fiji and Samoa was due to take place on 9 August 2025 at Churchill Park, Lautoka. However, the test match was abandoned, and the teams instead played a 90-minute friendly game on the same date, at the alternate venue of Lawaqa Park, Sigatoka. Fiji won the fixture 31–10.
