= 2024 WXV =

2024 edition of the WXV women's rugby union tournament

Tournament details
- Host: Canada (WXV 1); South Africa (WXV 2); United Arab Emirates (WXV 3)
- Dates: 27 September — 13 October 2024
- Teams: 18 (6 in 3 divisions each)
- Website: wxvrugby.com

The 2024 WXV was the second edition of WXV, a Women's international rugby union group tournament for national teams organised by World Rugby. It took place between 27 September and 13 October 2024. The competition featured three divisions of six nations each. Participating teams were determined by regional competitions and play-in/play-off matches.

Canada hosted the first-division WXV 1, South Africa hosted the second-division WXV 2, and the United Arab Emirates hosted the third-division WXV 3.

England, Australia and Spain respectively won their competitions by all going unbeaten.

== Format ==
The competition used a group tournament featuring a league system of three divisions with six teams each: WXV 1, WXV 2 and WXV 3. The 6 teams in each division were divided into two pools of 3 and played against teams in the other pool. There was one standings table for each tier and teams were awarded four competition points for winning a match, two points for a draw, and zero points for a loss. A bonus point was awarded for scoring four or more tries in a match or losing by seven or fewer match points. Classification tiebreakers were decided in order of: the result of matches between tied teams, match points difference, tries difference, match points for, tries for, and world rank.

The tournament acted as the final qualifier for the 2025 Rugby World Cup.

== Qualification ==
=== 2024 WXV Qualifiers ===
WXV 1
- Canada
- England
- France
- Ireland
- New Zealand
- United States
WXV 2
- Australia
- Italy
- Japan
- Scotland
- South Africa
- Wales
WXV 3
- Fiji
- Hong Kong China
- Madagascar
- Netherlands
- Samoa
- Spain

Regional competitions determined the participants in the competition, including the play-offs and play-in matches staged in 2024. The top three teams from that year's Six Nations and Pacific Four series were placed in WXV 1. The fourth-placed teams in both tournaments were placed in WXV 2, alongside the fifth-placed team in the Six Nations and the champions of that year's African and Asian championships; their runners-up were placed in WXV 3. The winners of a play-in between the sixth-placed Six Nations team and the European champions were placed in WXV 2, while the losers were placed in WXV 3 alongside the winners of a playoff between the sixth-placed team in the 2023 WXV 3, Colombia, and the highest ranked team at the end of the 2023 tournament that did not compete, the Netherlands. They joined both the champions and runners-up from that year's Oceanian championship.

=== Play-offs ===
==== WXV 3 promotion/relegation play-off ====
16 March 2024
14:00 CET (UTC+1)

| Netherlands | 33–11 (Note: The Netherlands are placed in WXV 3 and Colombia fail to qualify.) | Colombia |
| Try: Prins 15' c Stallmann 18' c Jongerius 42' m Van Nifterik 67' c Kievit 71' c Con: Metz (4/5) 16', 19', 68', 72'; Cards: Boot (yellow card) 46' | Report | Try: Mestra 11' m Pen: Arzuaga (2/2) 35', 54' |

NRCA Stadium, Amsterdam
Referee: Doriane Domenjo (France)

==== European play-in ====
29 June
17:35 BST (UTC+1)

| Wales | 52–20 (Note: Wales are placed in WXV 2 and Spain are placed in WXV 3.) | Spain |
| Try: Lewis 3' c Fleming 12' c Joyce-Butchers 35' c Cox (3) 45' c, 63' m, 77' c Evans 54' c Hesketh 71' m Con: Bevan (5) 4', 13', 36', 47', 55'; George 78'; Cards: Cox (yellow card) 21' | Report | Try: Antolínez 25' c Peña 31' m Pérez 37' m Con: Argudo 26'; Pen: Argudo 22' |

Cardiff Arms Park, Cardiff
Attendance: 2,436
Referee: Aurélie Groizeleau (France)

== Match officials ==
World Rugby named the following eighteen referees, one assistant referee and eleven television match officials: The host country union would also appoint assistant referees in both WXV 1 & 2.

WXV 1
Referees

- Aimee Barrett-Theron (South Africa)
- Maggie Cogger-Orr (New Zealand)
- Sara Cox (England)
- Aurélie Groizeleau (France)
- Kat Roche (United States)
- Julianne Zussman (Canada)

Television match officials / Foul play review officers

- Leo Colgan (Ireland)
- Quinton Immelman (South Africa)
- Andrew McMenemy (Scotland)
- Ian Tempest (England)

WVX 2
Referees

- Ella Goldsmith (Australia)
- Maria Latos (Germany)
- Amelia Luciano (United States)
- Clara Munarini (Italy)
- Zoë Naudé (South Africa)
- Precious Pazani (Zimbabwe)

Television match officials / Foul play review officers

- Chris Assmus (Canada)
- Matteo Liperini (Italy)
- Aaron Paterson (New Zealand)
- Estelle Whaiapu (New Zealand)

WVX 3
Referees

- Shanda Assmus (Canada)
- Natarsha Ganley (New Zealand)
- Mélissa Leboeuf (France)
- Jess Ling (Australia)
- Tyler Miller (Australia)
- Holly Wood (England)

Assistant referees

- Sunny Lee (Hong Kong China)

Television match officials / Foul play review officers

- Rachel Horton (Australia)
- Dan Jones (England)
- Maria Heitor (Portugal)

== WXV 1 ==
2024 WXV 1

Tournament details
- Host: Canada
- Dates: 27 September — 13 October 2024
- Teams: Canada; England; France; Ireland; New Zealand; United States

Final positions
- Champions: England (2nd title)
- Runner-up: Ireland

Tournament statistics
- Matches played: 9
- Tries scored: 74 (8.22 per match)

The 2024 WXV 1 took place in Canada between 27 September and 13 October. England and France both qualified by cementing unassailable positions in the top two in the fourth round of the Women's Six Nations. Ireland joined them the following week by finishing third. Canada secured their place after the USA beat Australia in the Pacific Fours. New Zealand qualified the same weekend, after earning a losing bonus point against Canada.

Fixtures were confirmed on 16 July 2024. The first and final rounds took place at BC Place in Vancouver with the second round taking place at the Langley Events Centre in Langley. England, France and Ireland played matches against Canada, New Zealand, and the United States.

2024 WXV 1 table
| Pos | Team | Pld | W | D | L | PF | PA | PD | TF | TA | TB | LB | Pts |
|---|---|---|---|---|---|---|---|---|---|---|---|---|---|
| 1 | England (C) | 3 | 3 | 0 | 0 | 131 | 64 | +67 | 21 | 10 | 2 | 0 | 14 |
| 2 | Ireland | 3 | 2 | 0 | 1 | 63 | 62 | +1 | 10 | 8 | 2 | 0 | 10 |
| 3 | Canada (H) | 3 | 2 | 0 | 1 | 79 | 53 | +26 | 12 | 8 | 1 | 0 | 9 |
| 4 | New Zealand | 3 | 1 | 0 | 2 | 97 | 92 | +5 | 15 | 16 | 2 | 1 | 7 |
| 5 | France | 3 | 1 | 0 | 2 | 60 | 99 | −39 | 9 | 16 | 1 | 0 | 5 |
| 6 | United States | 3 | 0 | 0 | 3 | 49 | 109 | −60 | 7 | 16 | 0 | 0 | 0 |

Updated to match(es) played on 12 October 2024. Source: WXV 2024
(C) Champion; (H) Host

=== Round 1 ===
29 September 2024
12:30 PDT (UTC-7)

| United States | 21–61 | England (1 BP) |
| Try: Kelter (2) 31' c, 44' c Zackary 58' c Con: Hawkins (3/3) 32', 45', 59' | Report | Try: Atkin-Davies 12' c Kildunne (2) 14' c, 78' c Brock 36' c Matthews 40+2' c Westcombe-Evans 50' m Talling 68' c Breach 74' c Wyrwas 80' c Con: Harrison (8/9) 13', 15', 37', 40+3', 69', 75', 79', 80+1' |

BC Place, Vancouver
Referee: Aurélie Groizeleau (France)

Team details

| FB | 15 | Bulou Mataitoga |
| RW | 14 | Cheta Emba | (substituted off) 63' |
| OC | 13 | Emily Henrich |
| IC | 12 | Alev Kelter |
| LW | 11 | Kris Thomas | (substituted off) 41' |
| FH | 10 | McKenzie Hawkins |
| SH | 9 | Taina Tukuafu | (substituted off) 68' |
| N8 | 8 | Rachel Johnson | (substituted off) 56' |
| OF | 7 | Kate Zackary (c) |
| BF | 6 | Tahlia Brody |
| RL | 5 | Hallie Taufo'ou |
| LL | 4 | Erica Jarrell | (substituted off) 71' |
| TP | 3 | Charli Jacoby | (substituted off) 41' |
| HK | 2 | Kathryn Treder | (substituted off) 63' |
| LP | 1 | Hope Rogers | (substituted off) 71' |
Replacements:
| HK | 16 | Paige Stathopoulos | (substituted on) 63' |
| PR | 17 | Catherine Benson | (substituted on) 71' |
| PR | 18 | Keia Mae Sagapiolu | (substituted on) 41' |
| LK | 19 | Emerson Allen | (substituted on) 71' |
| FL | 20 | Rachel Ehrecke | (substituted on) 56' |
| SH | 21 | Sophie Pyrz | (substituted on) 68' |
| WG | 22 | Joanne Fa'avesi | (substituted on) 41' |
| FB | 23 | Tess Feury | (substituted on) 63' |
Coach:
(Australia) Sione Fukofuka

| FB | 15 | Ellie Kildunne |
| RW | 14 | Bo Westcombe-Evans | (substituted off) 68' |
| OC | 13 | Emily Scarratt | (substituted off) 60' |
| IC | 12 | Phoebe Murray | (substituted off) 60' |
| LW | 11 | Jess Breach |
| FH | 10 | Zoe Harrison |
| SH | 9 | Lucy Packer |
| N8 | 8 | Alex Matthews (c) | (substituted off) 63' |
| OF | 7 | Georgia Brock |
| BF | 6 | Morwenna Talling |
| RL | 5 | Abbie Ward |
| LL | 4 | Rosie Galligan | (substituted off) 60' |
| TP | 3 | Sarah Bern | (substituted off) 53' |
| HK | 2 | Lark Atkin-Davies | (substituted off) 53' |
| LP | 1 | Mackenzie Carson | (substituted off) 63' |
Replacements:
| HK | 16 | Amy Cokayne | (substituted on) 53' |
| PR | 17 | Kelsey Clifford | (substituted on) 63' |
| PR | 18 | Maud Muir | (substituted on) 53' |
| LK | 19 | Zoe Aldcroft | (substituted on) 60' |
| FL | 20 | Maddie Feaunati | (substituted on) 63' |
| SH | 21 | Ella Wyrwas | (substituted on) 68' |
| FH | 22 | Holly Aitchison | (substituted on) 60' |
| CE | 23 | Helena Rowland | (substituted on) 60' |
Coach:
(New Zealand) John Mitchell

Player of the Match:
Alex Matthews (England)

Assistant referees:
Julianne Zussman (Canada)
Emma Gallagher (Canada)
Television match official:
Quinton Immelman (South Africa)
Foul play review officer:
Andrew McMenemy (Scotland)

29 September 2024
15:45 PDT (UTC-7)

| Canada (1 BP) | 46–24 | France (1 BP) |
| Try: Farries 4' c Bermudez (2) 23' c, 36' m Royer (2) 33' m, 52' c Tuttosi 67' c Hogan-Rochester 80+2' m Con: Tessier (4/7) 5', 24', 53', 68'; Pen: Tessier (1/1) 80+6' | Report | Try: Llorens 9' c M. Ménager 26' c Bourdon Sansus 47' m Konde 59' m Con: Jacquet (2/4) 10', 27' |

BC Place, Vancouver
Attendance: 4,500
Referee: Maggie Cogger-Orr (New Zealand)

Team details

| FB | 15 | Julia Schell |
| RW | 14 | Fancy Bermudez | (substituted off) 66' |
| OC | 13 | Shoshanah Seumanutafa |
| IC | 12 | Alex Tessier |
| LW | 11 | Paige Farries | (substituted off) 65' |
| FH | 10 | Claire Gallagher |
| SH | 9 | Justine Pelletier (c) | (substituted off) 61' |
| N8 | 8 | Gabby Senft |
| OF | 7 | Fabiola Forteza |
| BF | 6 | Pamphinette Buisa | (substituted off) 66' |
| RL | 5 | Laetitia Royer |
| LL | 4 | Tyson Beukeboom | (substituted off) 56' |
| TP | 3 | DaLeaka Menin | (substituted off) 61' |
| HK | 2 | Emily Tuttosi | (substituted off) 73' |
| LP | 1 | Brittany Kassil | (substituted off) 56' |
Replacements:
| HK | 16 | Sara Cline | (substituted on) 73' |
| PR | 17 | McKinley Hunt | (substituted on) 56' |
| PR | 18 | Alex Ellis | (substituted on) 61' |
| FL | 19 | Courtney Holtkamp | (substituted on) 56' |
| FL | 20 | Caroline Crossley | (substituted on) 66' |
| SH | 21 | Olivia Apps | (substituted on) 61' |
| WG | 22 | Alysha Corrigan | (substituted on) 75' |
| WG | 23 | Asia Hogan-Rochester | (substituted on) 66' |
Coach:
(France) Kévin Rouet

| FB | 15 | Chloé Jacquet |
| RW | 14 | Marine Ménager |
| OC | 13 | Nassira Konde | | (substituted off) 71' |
| IC | 12 | Gabrielle Vernier |
| LW | 11 | Mélissande Llorens |
| FH | 10 | Lina Queyroi |
| SH | 9 | Pauline Bourdon Sansus | | (substituted off) 73' |
| N8 | 8 | Romane Ménager |
| OF | 7 | Émeline Gros | | (substituted off) 56' |
| BF | 6 | Axelle Berthoumieu | | (substituted off) 56' |
| RL | 5 | Madoussou Fall Raclot | (yellow card) 77' |
| LL | 4 | Manaé Feleu (c) |
| TP | 3 | Assia Khalfaoui | | (substituted off) 32' |
| HK | 2 | Agathe Sochat | | (substituted off) 68' |
| LP | 1 | Yllana Brosseau | | (substituted off) 56' |
Replacements:
| HK | 16 | Manon Bigot | | (substituted on) 76' |
| PR | 17 | Amber Mwayembe | | (substituted on) 56' |
| PR | 18 | Rose Bernadou | | (substituted on) 32' |
| LK | 19 | Hina Ikahehegi | | (substituted on) 78' |
| FL | 20 | Teani Feleu | | (substituted on) 56' |
| FL | 21 | Séraphine Okemba |
| SH | 22 | Alexandra Chambon | | (substituted on) 73' |
| FH | 23 | Lina Tuy | | (substituted on) 71' |
Coach:
(France) Gaëlle Mignot

Player of the Match:
Laetitia Royer (Canada)

Assistant referees:
Aimee Barrett-Theron (South Africa)
Kat Roche (United States)
Television match official:
Leo Colgan (Ireland)
Foul play review officer:
Quinton Immelman (South Africa)

29 September 2024
19:00 PDT (UTC-7)

| New Zealand (1 BP) | 27–29 | Ireland (1 BP) |
| Try: Lolohea 9' c Vaha'akolo 40+1' c Paul 73' c Con: Holmes (3/3) 10', 40+1', 74'; Pen: Holmes (2/2) 19', 57' | Report | Try: Wafer (2) 14' m, 32' c Jones 38' m King (2) 67' m, 79' c Con: O'Brien (2/5) 33', 80' |

BC Place, Vancouver
Referee: Sara Cox (England)

Team details

| FB | 15 | Renee Holmes |
| RW | 14 | Ruby Tui | (substituted off) 52' |
| OC | 13 | Amy du Plessis |
| IC | 12 | Sylvia Brunt |
| LW | 11 | Katelyn Vaha'akolo |
| FH | 10 | Ruahei Demant (cc) | (substituted off) 72' |
| SH | 9 | Maia Joseph | (substituted off) 57' |
| N8 | 8 | Liana Mikaele-Tu'u |
| OF | 7 | Kennedy Tukuafu (cc) | (substituted off) 52' |
| BF | 6 | Layla Sae |
| RL | 5 | Maia Roos |
| LL | 4 | Chelsea Bremner |
| TP | 3 | Amy Rule | (substituted off) 45' |
| HK | 2 | Atlanta Lolohea | (substituted off) 45' |
| LP | 1 | Marcelle Parkes | (substituted off) 45' |
Replacements:
| HK | 16 | Luka Connor | (substituted on) 45' |
| PR | 17 | Chryss Viliko | (substituted on) 45' |
| PR | 18 | Tanya Kalounivale | (substituted on) 45' |
| LK | 19 | Alana Bremner | (substituted on) 52' |
| FL | 20 | Lucy Jenkins | (substituted on) 52' |
| SH | 21 | Iritana Hohaia | (substituted on) 57' |
| FH | 22 | Hannah King | (substituted on) 72' |
| WG | 23 | Mererangi Paul | (substituted on) 52' |
Coach:
(New Zealand) Allan Bunting

| FB | 15 | Stacey Flood |
| RW | 14 | Eimear Considine |
| OC | 13 | Aoife Dalton | | (substituted off) 49' |
| IC | 12 | Enya Breen |
| LW | 11 | Amee-Leigh Murphy Crowe |
| FH | 10 | Dannah O'Brien |
| SH | 9 | Molly Scuffil-McCabe | | (substituted off) 49' |
| N8 | 8 | Brittany Hogan |
| OF | 7 | Edel McMahon (c) | | (substituted off) 49' |
| BF | 6 | Aoife Wafer |
| RL | 5 | Fiona Tuite | | (substituted off) 69' |
| LL | 4 | Dorothy Wall |
| TP | 3 | Linda Djougang |
| HK | 2 | Neve Jones | | (substituted off) 49' |
| LP | 1 | Niamh O'Dowd | (yellow card) 52' |
Replacements:
| HK | 16 | Cliodhna Moloney | | (substituted on) 49' |
| PR | 17 | Siobhan McCarthy | | (substituted on) 52' (substituted off) 64' |
| PR | 18 | Andrea Stock |
| FL | 19 | Grace Moore | | (substituted on) 49' |
| FL | 20 | Erin King | | (substituted on) 49' |
| SH | 21 | Emily Lane | | (substituted on) 49' |
| CE | 22 | Eve Higgins | | (substituted on) 49' |
| WG | 23 | Vicky Elmes Kinlan |
Coach:
(England) Scott Bemand

Player of the Match:
Aoife Wafer (Ireland)

Assistant referees:
Kat Roche (United States)
Kristine Lovatt (Canada)
Television match official:
Ian Tempest (England)
Foul play review officer:
Andrew McMenemy (Scotland)

=== Round 2 ===
5 October 2024
12:30 PDT (UTC-7)

| United States | 14–22 | France |
| Try: Johnson 55' c Taufo'ou 80+2' c Con: Hawkins (2/2) 55', 80+2' | Report | Try: M. Ménager 23' m R. Ménager 45' c Teani Feleu 48' c Con: Queyroi (2/3) 46', 49'; Pen: Queyroi 9' |

Langley Events Centre, Langley
Referee: Julianne Zussman (Canada)

Team details

| FB | 15 | Bulou Mataitoga |
| RW | 14 | Cheta Emba |
| OC | 13 | Alev Kelter |
| IC | 12 | Gabby Cantorna |
| LW | 11 | Lotte Sharp |
| FH | 10 | McKenzie Hawkins |
| SH | 9 | Taina Tukuafu |
| N8 | 8 | Rachel Johnson |
| OF | 7 | Kate Zackary (c) |
| BF | 6 | Tahlia Brody |
| RL | 5 | Hallie Taufo'ou |
| LL | 4 | Erica Jarrell |
| TP | 3 | Charli Jacoby |
| HK | 2 | Kathryn Treder |
| LP | 1 | Hope Rogers |
Replacements:
| HK | 16 | Paige Stathopoulos |
| PR | 17 | Maya Learned |
| PR | 18 | Keia Mae Sagapiolu |
| LK | 19 | Rachel Ehrecke |
| FL | 20 | Tessa Hann |
| SH | 21 | Cassidy Bargell |
| WG | 22 | Joanne Fa'avesi |
| FB | 23 | Tess Feury |
Coach:
(Australia) Sione Fukofuka

| FB | 15 | Chloé Jacquet |
| RW | 14 | Cyrielle Banet |
| OC | 13 | Nassira Konde |
| IC | 12 | Gabrielle Vernier |
| LW | 11 | Marine Ménager |
| FH | 10 | Lina Queyroi |
| SH | 9 | Pauline Bourdon Sansus |
| N8 | 8 | Teani Feleu |
| OF | 7 | Émeline Gros |
| BF | 6 | Romane Ménager |
| RL | 5 | Madoussou Fall Raclot |
| LL | 4 | Manaé Feleu (c) |
| TP | 3 | Assia Khalfaoui |
| HK | 2 | Agathe Sochat |
| LP | 1 | Yllana Brosseau |
Replacements:
| HK | 16 | Élisa Riffonneau |
| PR | 17 | Amber Mwayembe |
| PR | 18 | Rose Bernadou |
| LK | 19 | Axelle Berthoumieu |
| FL | 20 | Séraphine Okemba |
| SH | 21 | Océane Bordes |
| FH | 22 | Lina Tuy |
| FB | 23 | Emilie Boulard |
Coach:
(France) Gaëlle Mignot

Assistant referees:
Sara Cox (England)
Emma Gallagher (Canada)
Television match official:
Ian Tempest (England)
Foul play review officer:
Leo Colgan (Ireland)

5 October 2024
15:45 PDT (UTC-7)

| Canada | 21–8 | Ireland |
| Try: Penalty try 26'; Gallagher 34' c Omokhuale 37' c Con: Tessier 35', 38' | Report | Try: Considine 46' m Pen: O'Brien 33' |

Langley Events Centre, Langley
Referee: Aimee Barrett-Theron (South Africa)

Team details

| FB | 15 | Taylor Perry | | (substituted off) 49' |
| RW | 14 | Fancy Bermudez |
| OC | 13 | Shoshanah Seumanutafa | | (substituted off) 49' |
| IC | 12 | Alex Tessier |
| LW | 11 | Alysha Corrigan |
| FH | 10 | Claire Gallagher |
| SH | 9 | Justine Pelletier |
| N8 | 8 | Gabby Senft |
| OF | 7 | Caroline Crossley | | (substituted off) 41' |
| BF | 6 | Julia Omokhuale | | (substituted off) 65' |
| RL | 5 | Courtney Holtkamp |
| LL | 4 | Tyson Beukeboom | | (substituted off) 41' |
| TP | 3 | Alexandria Ellis | (yellow card) 32' | (substituted off) 68' |
| HK | 2 | Emily Tuttosi | | (substituted off) 73' |
| LP | 1 | Brittany Kassil | | (substituted off) 51' |
Replacements:
| HK | 16 | Sara Cline | | (substituted on) 73' |
| PR | 17 | McKinley Hunt | | (substituted on) 51' |
| PR | 18 | Rori Wood | | (substituted on) 68' |
| BR | 19 | Laetitia Royer | | (substituted on) 41' |
| BR | 20 | Fabiola Forteza | | (substituted on) 41' |
| BR | 21 | Karen Paquin | | (substituted on) 65' |
| SH | 22 | Olivia Apps | | (substituted on) 40+' |
| FB | 23 | Julia Schell | | (substituted on) 49' |
Coach:
(France) Kévin Rouet

| FB | 15 | Stacey Flood | | (substituted on) 77' |
| RW | 14 | Eimear Considine | | (substituted off) 28' |
| OC | 13 | Eve Higgins | | (substituted off) 77' |
| IC | 12 | Enya Breen |
| LW | 11 | Amee-Leigh Murphy Crowe |
| FH | 10 | Dannah O'Brien | | (substituted off) 50' |
| SH | 9 | Emily Lane |
| N8 | 8 | Brittany Hogan |
| OF | 7 | Aoife Wafer | | (substituted off) 65' |
| BF | 6 | Erin King |
| RL | 5 | Fiona Tuite | | (substituted off) 65' |
| LL | 4 | Dorothy Wall |
| TP | 3 | Linda Djougang | (yellow card) 25' | (substituted off) 73' |
| HK | 2 | Cliodhna Moloney | | (substituted off) 44' |
| LP | 1 | Niamh O'Dowd | (yellow card) 26' | (substituted off) 68' |
Replacements:
| HK | 16 | Neve Jones | | (substituted on) 44' |
| PR | 17 | Siobhan McCarthy | | (substituted on) 68' |
| PR | 18 | Andrea Stock | | (substituted on) 73' |
| BR | 19 | Grace Moore | | (substituted on) 65' |
| BR | 20 | Deirbhile Nic a Bháird | | (substituted on) 65' |
| SH | 21 | Molly Scuffil-McCabe |
| FH | 22 | Nicole Fowley | | (substituted on) 50' |
| CE | 23 | Aoife Dalton | | (substituted on) 50' |
Coach:
(England) Scott Bemand

Player of the Match:
Claire Gallagher (Canada)

Assistant referees:
Maggie Cogger-Orr (New Zealand)
Aurélie Groizeleau (France)
Television match official:
Andrew McMenemy (Scotland)
Foul play review officer:
Ian Tempest (England)

6 October 2024
13:00 PDT (UTC-7)

| (1 BP) New Zealand | 31–49 | England (1 BP) |
| Try: Olsen-Baker 6' c Leti-I'iga 34' m Ponsonby 58' c Roos 65' m Vaipulu 80+1' c Con: Holmes (1/2) 7'; King (2/3) 59', 80+2' | Report | Try: Dow (2) 10' c, 45' m Breach (3) 19' m, 52' m, 70' m Kildunne (2) 28' m, 40' m Hunt 48' c Harrison 77' m Con: Rowland (2/7) 11', 49' |

Langley Events Centre, Langley
Attendance: 1,500
Referee: Aurélie Groizeleau (France)

Team details

| FB | 15 | Renee Holmes | (substituted off) 51' |
| RW | 14 | Ayesha Leti-I'iga |
| OC | 13 | Sylvia Brunt |
| IC | 12 | Ruahei Demant (cc) |
| LW | 11 | Katelyn Vaha'akolo | (substituted off) 53' |
| FH | 10 | Hannah King |
| SH | 9 | Maia Joseph | (substituted off) 51' |
| N8 | 8 | Kaipo Olsen-Baker |
| OF | 7 | Kennedy Tukuafu (cc) |
| BF | 6 | Liana Mikaele-Tu'u |
| RL | 5 | Maia Roos | (substituted off) 66' |
| LL | 4 | Alana Bremner | (substituted off) 53' |
| TP | 3 | Tanya Kalounivale | (substituted off) 46' |
| HK | 2 | Georgia Ponsonby | (substituted off) 66' |
| LP | 1 | Chryss Viliko | (substituted off) 46' |
Replacements:
| HK | 16 | Atlanta Lolohea | (substituted on) 66' |
| PR | 17 | Kate Henwood | (substituted on) 46' |
| PR | 18 | Amy Rule | (substituted on) 46' |
| LK | 19 | Ma'ama Mo'onia Vaipulu | (substituted on) 66' |
| FL | 20 | Layla See | (substituted on) 53' |
| SH | 21 | Iritana Hohaia | (substituted on) 51' |
| WG | 22 | Mererangi Paul | (substituted on) 51' |
| WG | 23 | Ruby Tui | (substituted on) 53' |
Coach:
(New Zealand) Allan Bunting

| FB | 15 | Ellie Kildunne |
| RW | 14 | Abby Dow | (substituted off) 71' |
| OC | 13 | Helena Rowland |
| IC | 12 | Tatyana Heard | (substituted off) 22' | (substituted on) 32' | (substituted off) 66' |
| LW | 11 | Jess Breach |
| FH | 10 | Holly Aitchison |
| SH | 9 | Natasha Hunt |
| N8 | 8 | Alex Matthews |
| OF | 7 | Marlie Packer (c) | (substituted off) 59' |
| BF | 6 | Morwenna Talling |
| RL | 5 | Abbie Ward | (substituted off) 67' |
| LL | 4 | Zoe Aldcroft |
| TP | 3 | Maud Muir | (substituted off) 55' |
| HK | 2 | Amy Cokayne | (substituted off) 55' |
| LP | 1 | Hannah Botterman | (substituted off) 55' |
Replacements:
| HK | 16 | Lark Atkin-Davies | (substituted on) 55' |
| PR | 17 | Mackenzie Carson | (substituted on) 55' |
| PR | 18 | Sarah Bern | (substituted on) 55' |
| LK | 19 | Rosie Galligan | (substituted on) 67' |
| FL | 20 | Maddie Feaunati | (substituted on) 55' |
| SH | 21 | Lucy Packer | (substituted on) 66' |
| FH | 22 | Zoe Harrison | (substituted on) 71' |
| CE | 23 | Emily Scarratt | (substituted on) 22' | (substituted off) 32' | (substituted on) 66' |
Coach:
(New Zealand) John Mitchell

Player of the Match:
Jess Breach (England)

Assistant referees:
Aimee Barrett-Theron (South Africa)
Kristine Lovatt (Canada)
Television match official:
Quinton Immelman (South Africa)
Foul play review officer:
Leo Colgan (Ireland)

=== Round 3 ===
11 October 2024
12:30 PDT (UTC-7)

| United States | 14–26 | Ireland (1 BP) |
| Try: Rogers (2) 18' c, 40' c Con: Hawkins (2/2) 19', 40+1' | Report | Try: King 28' c Penalty try 63'; Moloney 73' c Murphy Crowe 76' m Con: Fowley (1/1) 29' c O'Brien (1/2) 73' |

BC Place, Vancouver
Referee: Maggie Cogger-Orr (New Zealand)

12 October 2024
15:45 PDT (UTC-7)

| (1 BP) New Zealand | 39–14 | France |
| Try: Leti-I'iga 8' m Vaha'akolo (3) 14' m, 43' m, 44' c A. Bremner 20' m Olsen-Baker 48' c Kalounivale 57' m Con: King (2/7) 45', 49' | Report | Try: Gros 16' c M. Feleu 30' c Con: Queyroi (2/2) 18', 31' |

BC Place, Vancouver
Referee: Sara Cox (England)

12 October 2024
19:00 PDT (UTC-7)

| Canada | 12–21 | England |
| Try: Pelletier 4' m Tessier 51' c Con: Tessier (1/2) 52' | Report | Try: Muir 9' c Bern 67' c Aldcroft 80' c Con: Rowland (3/3) 10', 68', 81' |

BC Place, Vancouver
Attendance: 3,000
Referee: Aimee Barrett-Theron (South Africa)

Team details

| FB | 15 | Julia Schell |
| RW | 14 | Asia Hogan-Rochester |
| OC | 13 | Shoshanah Seumanutafa |
| IC | 12 | Alex Tessier |
| LW | 11 | Paige Farries |
| FH | 10 | Claire Gallagher |
| SH | 9 | Justine Pelletier |
| N8 | 8 | Gabrielle Senft |
| OF | 7 | Fabiola Forteza |
| BF | 6 | Pamphinette Buisa |
| RL | 5 | Laetitia Royer |
| LL | 4 | Courtney Holtkamp |
| TP | 3 | DaLeaka Menin |
| HK | 2 | Emily Tuttosi |
| LP | 1 | McKinley Hunt |
Replacements:
| HK | 16 | Sara Cline |
| PR | 17 | Brittany Kassil |
| PR | 18 | Alex Ellis |
| LK | 19 | Tyson Beukeboom |
| FL | 20 | Julia Omokhuale |
| SH | 21 | Olivia Apps |
| WI | 22 | Alysha Corrigan |
| WI | 23 | Fancy Bermudez |
Coach:
(France) Kévin Rouet

| FB | 15 | Ellie Kildunne |
| RW | 14 | Bo Westcombe-Evans |
| OC | 13 | Helena Rowland |
| IC | 12 | Tatyana Heard |
| LW | 11 | Jess Breach |
| FH | 10 | Holly Aitchison |
| SH | 9 | Natasha Hunt |
| N8 | 8 | Alex Matthews |
| OF | 7 | Marlie Packer (c) |
| BF | 6 | Maddie Feaunati |
| RL | 5 | Rosie Galligan |
| LL | 4 | Zoe Aldcroft |
| TP | 3 | Maud Muir |
| HK | 2 | Amy Cokayne |
| LP | 1 | Hannah Botterman |
Replacements:
| HK | 16 | Lark Atkin-Davies |
| PR | 17 | Mackenzie Carson |
| PR | 18 | Sarah Bern |
| LK | 19 | Abbie Ward |
| FL | 20 | Morwenna Talling |
| SH | 21 | Lucy Packer |
| FH | 22 | Zoe Harrison |
| CE | 23 | Emily Scarratt |
Coach:
(New Zealand) John Mitchell

Assistant referees:
Aurélie Groizeleau (France)
Maggie Cogger-Orr (New Zealand)
Television match official:
Quinton Immelman (South Africa)
Foul play review officer:
Andrew McMenemy (Scotland)

== WXV 2 ==
2024 WXV 2

Tournament details
- Host: South Africa
- Dates: 27 September — 13 October 2024
- Teams: Australia; Italy; Japan; Scotland; South Africa; Wales

Final positions
- Champions: Australia (1st title)
- Runner-up: Scotland

Tournament statistics
- Matches played: 9
- Tries scored: 54 (6 per match)

The 2024 WXV 2 took place in South Africa between 27 September and 13 October. Scotland and Italy qualified by finishing fourth and fifth respectively in the Six Nations, Australia by finishing fourth in the Pacific Four series. South Africa qualified by winning the 2024 Rugby Africa Women's Cup. Japan qualified by winning the 2024 Rugby Asia Women's Championship. The final qualifier was Wales, who won a European play-in tie against Spain, with the latter dropping to WXV 3.

Fixtures were confirmed on 16 July 2024. The first round took place at the DHL Stadium in Cape Town with the second and final rounds taking place at the Athlone Stadium in Cape Town. Australia, Italy and Japan played matches against Scotland, South Africa, and Wales.

2024 WXV 2 table
| Pos | Team | Pld | W | D | L | PF | PA | PD | TF | TA | TB | LB | Pts |
|---|---|---|---|---|---|---|---|---|---|---|---|---|---|
| 1 | Australia (C) | 3 | 3 | 0 | 0 | 101 | 53 | +48 | 15 | 10 | 3 | 0 | 15 |
| 2 | Scotland | 3 | 2 | 0 | 1 | 60 | 44 | +16 | 10 | 6 | 1 | 0 | 9 |
| 3 | Italy | 3 | 2 | 0 | 1 | 31 | 43 | −12 | 4 | 4 | 0 | 0 | 8 |
| 4 | South Africa (H) | 3 | 1 | 0 | 2 | 76 | 80 | −4 | 12 | 9 | 2 | 2 | 8 |
| 5 | Wales | 3 | 1 | 0 | 2 | 29 | 55 | −26 | 3 | 9 | 0 | 1 | 5 |
| 6 | Japan | 3 | 0 | 0 | 3 | 47 | 69 | −22 | 8 | 11 | 1 | 2 | 3 |

Updated to match(es) played on 12 October 2024. Source: WXV 2024
(C) Champion; (H) Host

=== Round 1 ===
27 September 2024
16:00 SAST (UTC+2)

| (1 BP) South Africa | 31–24 | Japan (2 BP) |
| Try: Hele 13' m Qawe 25' m Charlie 37' c Malinga 45' c Ubisi 58' c Con: Cilliers (3/5) 38', 46', 59' | Report | Try: Taniguchi 10' c Otsuka 20' m Saito (2) 49' m, 53' c Con: Otsuka (1/2) 11'; Matsumura (1/2) 54' |

DHL Stadium, Cape Town
Referee: Maria Latos (Germany)

Team details

| FB | 15 | Libbie Janse van Rensburg |
| RW | 14 | Jakkie Cilliers |
| OC | 13 | Eloise Webb | | (substituted off) 62' |
| IC | 12 | Chumisa Qawe |
| LW | 11 | Ayanda Malinga |
| FH | 10 | Nadine Roos |
| SH | 9 | Tayla Kinsey | | (substituted off) 72' |
| N8 | 8 | Aseza Hele | | (substituted off) 72' |
| OF | 7 | Sinazo Mcatshulwa |
| BF | 6 | Sizophila Solontsi | | (substituted off) 57' |
| RL | 5 | Vainah Ubisi | (yellow card) 78' |
| LL | 4 | Nolusindiso Booi (c) | | (substituted off) 57' |
| TP | 3 | Babalwa Latsha | | (substituted off) 57' |
| HK | 2 | Lindelwa Gwala | | (substituted off) 57' |
| LP | 1 | Sanelisiwe Charlie | | (substituted off) 57' |
Replacements:
| HK | 16 | Micke Günter | | (substituted on) 57' |
| PR | 17 | Yonela Ngxingolo | | (substituted on) 57' |
| PR | 18 | Azisa Mkiva | | (substituted on) 57' |
| LK | 19 | Danelle Lochner |
| BR | 20 | Catha Jacobs | | (substituted on) 57' |
| BR | 21 | Anathi Qolo | | (substituted on) 72' |
| SH | 22 | Unam Tose | | (substituted on) 72' |
| CE | 23 | Zintle Mpupha | | (substituted on) 62' |
Coach:
(South Africa) Swys de Bruin

| FB | 15 | Sora Nishimura | | (substituted off) 69' |
| RW | 14 | Misaki Matsumura |
| OC | 13 | Mana Furuta |
| IC | 12 | Haruka Hirotsu | | (substituted off) 69' |
| LW | 11 | Komachi Imakugi |
| FH | 10 | Ayasa Otsuka | (yellow card) 56' |
| SH | 9 | Moe Tsukui | | (substituted off) 74' |
| N8 | 8 | Seina Saito | | (substituted off) 57' |
| OF | 7 | Iroha Nagata (c) |
| BF | 6 | Masami Kawamura |
| RL | 5 | Otoka Yoshimura |
| LL | 4 | Yuna Sato | | (substituted off) 57' |
| TP | 3 | Wako Kitano | | (substituted off) 62' |
| HK | 2 | Kotomi Taniguchi | | (substituted off) 74' |
| LP | 1 | Sachiko Kato | | (substituted off) 62' |
Replacements:
| HK | 16 | Asuka Kuge | | (substituted on) 74' |
| PR | 17 | Manami Mine | | (substituted on) 62' |
| PR | 18 | Nijiho Nagata | | (substituted on) 62' |
| FL | 19 | Kyoko Hosokawa | | (substituted on) 57' |
| FL | 20 | Jennifer Nduka | | (substituted on) 57' |
| SH | 21 | Megumi Abe | | (substituted on) 74' |
| CE | 22 | Rinka Matsuda | | (substituted on) 69' |
| CE | 23 | Kanako Kobayashi | | (substituted on) 69' |
Coach:
(Canada) Lesley McKenzie

Player of the Match:
Chumisa Qawe (South Africa)

Assistant referees:
Precious Pazani (Zimbabwe)
Ella Goldsmith (Australia)
Television match official:
Matteo Liperini (Italy)
Foul play review officer:
Estelle Whaiapu (New Zealand)

28 September 2024
12:30 SAST (UTC+2)

| (1 BP) Australia | 37–5 | Wales |
| Try: Morgan 21' m Karpani 40' m Stewart (2) 63' c, 74' c Moleka 65' m Cramer 68' m Con: Cramer (2/4) 63', 75'; Pen: Moleka (1/1) 56' | Report | Try: Phillips 31' m |

DHL Stadium, Cape Town
Referee: Clara Munarini (Italy)

Team details

| FB | 15 | Caitlyn Halse |
| RW | 14 | Maya Stewart |
| OC | 13 | Georgina Friedrichs |
| IC | 12 | Trilleen Pomare |
| LW | 11 | Desiree Miller |
| FH | 10 | Faitala Moleka |
| SH | 9 | Layne Morgan |
| N8 | 8 | Tabua Tuinakauvadra |
| OF | 7 | Ashley Marsters |
| BF | 6 | Siokapesi Palu |
| RL | 5 | Michaela Leonard (c) |
| LL | 4 | Kaitlan Leaney |
| TP | 3 | Asoiva Karpani |
| HK | 2 | Tania Naden |
| LP | 1 | Bridie O'Gorman |
Replacements:
| HK | 16 | Tiarna Molloy |
| PR | 17 | Lydia Kavoa |
| PR | 18 | Alapeta Ngauamo |
| SR | 19 | Atasi Lafai |
| LF | 20 | Lucy Dinnen |
| SH | 21 | Natalie Wright |
| CE | 22 | Cecilia Smith |
| FB | 23 | Lori Cramer |
Coach:
(England) Jo Yapp

| FB | 15 | Jenny Hesketh |
| RW | 14 | Jasmine Joyce |
| OC | 13 | Carys Cox |
| IC | 12 | Kerin Lake |
| LW | 11 | Nel Metcalfe |
| FH | 10 | Lleucu George |
| SH | 9 | Keira Bevan (c) |
| N8 | 8 | Bethan Lewis |
| OF | 7 | Alex Callender |
| BF | 6 | Alisha Butchers |
| RL | 5 | Georgia Evans |
| LL | 4 | Natalia John |
| TP | 3 | Donna Rose |
| HK | 2 | Carys Phillips |
| LP | 1 | Gwenllian Pyrs |
Replacements:
| HK | 16 | Molly Reardon |
| PR | 17 | Abbey Constable |
| PR | 18 | Jenni Scoble |
| SR | 19 | Abbie Fleming |
| BR | 20 | Bryonie King |
| SH | 21 | Sian Jones |
| FB | 22 | Kayleigh Powell |
| FB | 23 | Courtney Keight |
Coach:
(Wales) Ioan Cunningham

Player of the Match:
Faitala Moleka (Australia)

Assistant referees:
Zoë Naudé (South Africa)
Angie Bezuidenhout (South Africa)
Television match official:
Aaron Paterson (New Zealand)
Foul play review officer:
Matteo Liperini (Italy)

28 September 2024
15:00 SAST (UTC+2)

| Italy | 0–19 | Scotland |
| | Report | Try: Rollie 27' c Skeldon 40+1' c Grant 76' m Con: Nelson (2/3) 28', 40+2' |

DHL Stadium, Cape Town
Referee: Amelia Luciano (United States)

Team details

| FB | 15 | Vittoria Ostuni Minuzzi |
| RW | 14 | Aura Muzzo | (yellow card) 26' |
| OC | 13 | Sara Mannini |
| IC | 12 | Beatrice Rigoni |
| LW | 11 | Francesca Granzotto |
| FH | 10 | Emma Stevanin |
| SH | 9 | Sofia Stefan |
| N8 | 8 | Elisa Giordano (c) |
| OF | 7 | Beatrice Veronese |
| BF | 6 | Ilaria Arrighetti |
| RL | 5 | Giordana Duca |
| LL | 4 | Sara Tounesi |
| TP | 3 | Sara Seye |
| HK | 2 | Laura Gurioli |
| LP | 1 | Emanuela Stecca |
Replacements:
| HK | 16 | Vittoria Vecchini |
| PR | 17 | Gaia Maris |
| PR | 18 | Vittoria Zanette |
| BR | 19 | Alessandra Frangipani |
| BR | 20 | Francesca Sgorbini |
| SH | 21 | Sofia Catellani |
| CE | 22 | Michela Sillari |
| FB | 23 | Beatrice Capomaggi |
Coach:
(Italy) Giovanni Raineri

| FB | 15 | Chloe Rollie |
| RW | 14 | Coreen Grant |
| OC | 13 | Emma Orr |
| IC | 12 | Meryl Smith |
| LW | 11 | Francesca McGhie |
| FH | 10 | Helen Nelson |
| SH | 9 | Caity Mattinson |
| N8 | 8 | Evie Gallagher |
| OF | 7 | Rachel McLachlan |
| BF | 6 | Rachel Malcolm (c) |
| RL | 5 | Sarah Bonar |
| LL | 4 | Fiona Mcintosh |
| TP | 3 | Christine Belisle |
| HK | 2 | Lana Skeldon |
| LP | 1 | Anne Young |
Replacements:
| HK | 16 | Elis Martin |
| PR | 17 | Lisa Cockburn |
| PR | 18 | Elliann Clarke |
| LK | 19 | Louise McMillan |
| BR | 20 | Alex Stewart |
| SH | 21 | Leia Brebner-Holden |
| CE | 22 | Lisa Thomson |
| FB | 23 | Lucia Scott |
Coach:
(Scotland) Bryan Easson

Player of the Match:
Evie Gallagher (Scotland)

Assistant referees:
Precious Pazani (Zimbabwe)
Angie Bezuidenhout (South Africa)
Television match official:
Chris Assmus (Canada)
Foul play review officer:
Estelle Whaiapu (New Zealand)

=== Round 2 ===
4 October 2024
16:00 SAST (UTC+2)

| (1 BP) Wales | 5–8 | Italy |
| Try: Bluck 35' m | Report | Try: Giordano 11' m Pen: Rigoni (1/1) 49' |

Athlone Stadium, Cape Town
Referee: Ella Goldsmith (Australia)

Team details

| FB | 15 | Jasmine Joyce |
| RW | 14 | Carys Cox |
| OC | 13 | Hannah Jones (c) | | (substituted off) 66' |
| IC | 12 | Hannah Bluck | | (substituted off) 69' |
| LW | 11 | Nel Metcalfe |
| FH | 10 | Lleucu George | | (substituted off) 80+2' |
| SH | 9 | Keira Bevan | 8' to 19' |
| N8 | 8 | Bethan Lewis |
| OF | 7 | Alex Callender |
| BF | 6 | Alisha Butchers |
| RL | 5 | Georgia Evans |
| LL | 4 | Natalia John | | (substituted off) 76' |
| TP | 3 | Donna Rose | | (substituted off) 42' |
| HK | 2 | Carys Phillips |
| LP | 1 | Gwenllian Pyrs |
Replacements:
| HK | 16 | Molly Reardon |
| PR | 17 | Maisie Davies |
| PR | 18 | Sisilia Tuipulotu | | (substituted on) 42' |
| SR | 19 | Alaw Pyrs | | (substituted on) 76' |
| BR | 20 | Kate Williams (rugby union) |
| SH | 21 | Sian Jones | | (substituted on) 8' (substituted off) 19' (substituted on) 80+2' |
| FB | 22 | Kayleigh Powell | | (substituted on) 66' |
| FB | 23 | Courtney Keight | | (substituted on) 69' |
Coach:
(Wales) Ioan Cunningham

| FB | 15 | Vittoria Ostuni Minuzzi |
| RW | 14 | Aura Muzzo | (substituted off) 8' |
| OC | 13 | Michela Sillari | (substituted off) 40' |
| IC | 12 | Beatrice Rigoni |
| LW | 11 | Francesca Granzotto |
| FH | 10 | Emma Stevanin |
| SH | 9 | Sofia Stefan |
| N8 | 8 | Elisa Giordano (c) |
| OF | 7 | Francesca Sgorbini | (substituted off) 77' |
| BF | 6 | Sara Tounesi | (substituted off) 40' |
| RL | 5 | Giordana Duca |
| LL | 4 | Valeria Fedrighi |
| TP | 3 | Sara Seye | (substituted off) 80+1' |
| HK | 2 | Vittoria Vecchini |
| LP | 1 | Silvia Turani |
Replacements:
| HK | 16 | Laura Gurioli |
| PR | 17 | Emanuela Stecca | (substituted on) 80+1' |
| PR | 18 | Vittoria Zanette |
| FW | 19 | Alessandra Frangipani |
| FW | 20 | Alissa Ranuccini | (substituted on) 40' |
| FW | 21 | Beatrice Veronese | (substituted on) 77' |
| BK | 22 | Sara Mannini | (substituted on) 40' |
| BK | 23 | Beatrice Capomaggi | (substituted on) 8' |
Coach:
(Italy) Giovanni Raineri

Player of the Match:
Sara Tounesi (Italy)

Assistant referees:
Amelia Luciano (United States)
Siyanda Pikoli (South Africa)
Television match official:
Aaron Paterson (New Zealand)
Foul play review officer:
Chris Assmus (Canada)

5 October 2024
14:00 SAST (UTC+2)

| (1 BP) Japan | 13–19 | Scotland |
| Try: Saito 29' m I. Nagata 67' m Pen: Otsuka (1/1) 58' | Report | Try: McGhie 3' c Stewart 40+1' m Lloyd 63' c Con: Nelson (1/2); Smith (1/1) 64' |

Athlone Stadium, Cape Town
Referee: Zoë Naudé (South Africa)

Team details

| FB | 15 | Sora Nishimura |
| RW | 14 | Rinka Matsuda |
| OC | 13 | Mana Furuta |
| IC | 12 | Haruka Hirotsu |
| LW | 11 | Komachi Imakugi |
| FH | 10 | Ayasa Otsuka |
| SH | 9 | Moe Tsukui |
| N8 | 8 | Seina Saito |
| OF | 7 | Iroha Nagata (c) |
| BF | 6 | Masami Kawamura |
| RL | 5 | Otoka Yoshimura |
| LL | 4 | Yuna Sato |
| TP | 3 | Wako Kitano |
| HK | 2 | Asuka Kuge |
| LP | 1 | Sachiko Kato |
Replacements:
| HK | 16 | Kotomi Taniguchi |
| PR | 17 | Manami Mine |
| PR | 18 | Nijiho Nagata |
| BR | 19 | Sakurako Korai |
| SR | 20 | Jennifer Nduka |
| SH | 21 | Megumi Abe |
| FH | 22 | Minori Yamamoto |
| CE | 23 | Kanako Kobayashi |
Coach:
(Canada) Lesley McKenzie

| FB | 15 | Chloe Rollie |
| RW | 14 | Rhona Lloyd |
| OC | 13 | Meryl Smith |
| IC | 12 | Lisa Thomson |
| LW | 11 | Francesca McGhie |
| FH | 10 | Helen Nelson |
| SH | 9 | Caity Mattinson |
| N8 | 8 | Jade Konkel-Roberts |
| OF | 7 | Alex Stewart |
| BF | 6 | Rachel Malcolm (c) |
| RL | 5 | Sarah Bonar |
| LL | 4 | Louise McMillan |
| TP | 3 | Elliann Clarke |
| HK | 2 | Lana Skeldon |
| LP | 1 | Leah Bartlett |
Replacements:
| HK | 16 | Elis Martin |
| PR | 17 | Anne Young |
| PR | 18 | Lisa Cockburn |
| SR | 19 | Eva Donaldson |
| BR | 20 | Evie Gallagher |
| SH | 21 | Leia Brebner-Holden |
| CE | 22 | Emma Orr |
| FB | 23 | Lucia Scott |
Coach:
(Scotland) Bryan Easson

Assistant referees:
Clara Munarini (Italy)
TBC
Television match official:
Matteo Liperini (Italy)
Foul play review officer:
Aaron Paterson (New Zealand)

5 October 2024
17:00 SAST (UTC+2)

| (2 BP) South Africa | 26–33 | Australia (1 BP) |
| Try: Tose 10' m Mcatshulwa 31' c Mpupha 74' c Günter 79' c Con: Roos (3/4) 32', 75', 80' | Report | Try: Palu 4' c Friedrichs 8' c Karpani 13' c Miller 50' m Stewart 56' c Con: Moleka (4/5) 5', 9', 14', 57' |

Athlone Stadium, Cape Town
Referee: Precious Pazani (Zimbabwe)

=== Round 3 ===
11 October 2024
16:00 SAST (UTC+2)

| Wales | 19–10 | Japan |
| Try: Metcalfe 10' m Bevan 14' c Joyce 43' c Con: Bevan (2/3) 15', 44' | Report | Try: Matsumura 62' m Otsuka 77' m |

Athlone Stadium, Cape Town

12 October 2024
14:00 SAST (UTC+2)

| (1 BP) South Africa | 19–23 | Italy |
| Try: Latsha 11' c Hele 48' m Malinga 52' m Con: Roos (2/2) 12', 53' | Report | Try: Turani 15' m, 40' c Sillari 37' m, Con: Sillari (1/3) 41'; Pen: Rigoni (2/2) 63', 72' |

Athlone Stadium, Cape Town

12 October 2024
17:00 SAST (UTC+2)

| (1 BP) Australia | 31–22 | Scotland (1 BP) |
| Try: Miller 12' c Stewart 18' c Smith 22' c Marsters 80' c Con: Moleka (4/4); Pen: Moleka (1/1) | Report | Try: Young 29' c Bartlett 29' c Rollie 34' m McGhie 69' m Con: Nelson (1/4) 30' |

Athlone Stadium, Cape Town

== WXV 3 ==
2024 WXV 3

Tournament details
- Host: United Arab Emirates
- Dates: 27 September — 13 October 2024
- Teams: Fiji; Hong Kong China; Madagascar; Netherlands; Samoa; Spain

Final positions
- Champions: Spain (1st title)
- Runner-up: Samoa

Tournament statistics
- Matches played: 9
- Tries scored: 56 (6.22 per match)

The 2024 WXV 3 took place in the United Arab Emirates between 27 September and 13 October. The Netherlands qualified after beating Colombia in the relegation play-off match. Madagascar qualified as runners up at the 2024 Rugby Africa Women's Cup. Fiji and Samoa secured their places in the top two of the Oceania Rugby Women's Championship on 29 May 2024. Hong Kong qualified as runners up at the 2024 Asia Rugby Women's Championship on 1 June 2024. Spain took their place as runners up in the WXV 2 European play-in qualification match.

Fixtures were confirmed on 16 July 2024. All the rounds took place at The Sevens Stadium in Dubai. Fiji, Madagascar, and the Netherlands played matches against Hong Kong, Samoa and Spain.

2024 WXV 3 table
| Pos | Team | Pld | W | D | L | PF | PA | PD | TF | TA | TB | LB | Pts |
|---|---|---|---|---|---|---|---|---|---|---|---|---|---|
| 1 | Spain (C) | 3 | 3 | 0 | 0 | 113 | 8 | +105 | 17 | 1 | 2 | 0 | 14 |
| 2 | Samoa | 3 | 2 | 1 | 0 | 99 | 40 | +59 | 14 | 6 | 2 | 0 | 12 |
| 3 | Netherlands | 3 | 1 | 1 | 1 | 41 | 31 | +10 | 6 | 4 | 1 | 0 | 7 |
| 4 | Fiji | 3 | 1 | 0 | 2 | 63 | 58 | +5 | 10 | 7 | 1 | 1 | 6 |
| 5 | Hong Kong China | 3 | 1 | 0 | 2 | 44 | 78 | −34 | 6 | 12 | 1 | 0 | 5 |
| 6 | Madagascar | 3 | 0 | 0 | 3 | 22 | 167 | −145 | 3 | 26 | 0 | 0 | 0 |

Updated to match(es) played on 12 October 2024. Source: WXV 2024
(C) Champion

=== Round 1 ===
27 September 2024
19:00 GST (UTC+4)

| Spain | 83–0 | Madagascar |
| Try: Piquero (3) 3' c, 47' m, 54' c Cisa (2) 6' m, 20' c Blanco 11' m Pérez 17' c Argudo 25' c Castellucci 39' c Peña 50' m Fernández de Corres 57' c Román Mallén 69' c Calvo 74' c Con: Argudo (5/8) 3', 18', 21', 26', 40'; Peña (1/2) 55'; Pérez (3/3) 58', 69', 75' | Report |

The Sevens Stadium, Dubai
Referee: Mélissa Leboeuf (France)

Team details

| FB | 15 | Claudia Peña |
| RW | 14 | Claudia Pérez |
| OC | 13 | Claudia Cano |
| IC | 12 | Zahía Pérez |
| LW | 11 | Clara Piquero |
| FH | 10 | Amàlia Argudo |
| SH | 9 | Anne Fernández de Corres |
| N8 | 8 | Carmen Castellucci |
| OF | 7 | María Calvo |
| BF | 6 | Lia Piñeiro |
| RL | 5 | Lourdes Alameda |
| LL | 4 | Nadina Cisa |
| TP | 3 | Sidorella Bracic |
| HK | 2 | Cristina Blanco (c) |
| LP | 1 | Inés Antolínez |
Replacements:
| HK | 16 | María de las Huertas Román |
| PR | 17 | María del Castillo |
| PR | 18 | Laura Delgado |
| SR | 19 | Elena Martínez |
| SR | 20 | Alba Capell |
| SH | 21 | Lucía Díaz |
| CE | 22 | Maider Aresti |
| CE | 23 | Martina Márquez |
Coach:
(Spain) Juan González Marruecos

| FB | 15 | Tiana Razanamahefa |
| RW | 14 | Claudia Rasoarimalala |
| OC | 13 | Veronique Rasoanekena |
| IC | 12 | Valisoa Razanakiniana |
| LW | 11 | Zaya Fanantenana |
| FH | 10 | Marie Bodonandrianina |
| SH | 9 | Joela Mirasoa Fenohasina |
| N8 | 8 | Laurence Rasoanandrasana |
| OF | 7 | Delphine Raharimalala |
| BF | 6 | Sariaka Nomenjanahary |
| RL | 5 | Sarindra Sahondramalala (c) |
| LL | 4 | Oliviane Andriatsilavina |
| TP | 3 | Fenitra Razafindramanga |
| HK | 2 | Nanou Razafializay |
| LP | 1 | Mamisoa Rasoarimalala |
Replacements:
| HK | 16 | Miora Rabarivelo |
| PR | 17 | Nomenjanahary Rakotozafi |
| PR | 18 | Felana Rakotoarison |
| SR | 19 | Eleonore Rasoanantenaina |
| SR | 20 | Volatiana Rasoanandrasana |
| SH | 21 | Vonjimalala Ranorovololona |
| | 22 | Olivia Hanitriniaina |
| FH | 23 | Voahirana Razafiarisoa |
Coach:
(Madagascar) Alain Randriamihaja

Player of the Match:
Clara Piquero (Spain)

Assistant referees:
Shanda Assmus (Canada)
Sunny Lee (Hong Kong China)
Television match official:
Dan Jones (England)
Foul play review officer:
Maria Heitor (Portugal)

28 September 2024
18:00 GST (UTC+4)

| Fiji | 38–3 | Hong Kong China |
| Try: Korovata 2'm Lomani 5'm Naisewa (2) 42'c, 71'c Adi Tove 59'c Waisega 65'c Con: Tisolo (4/6) 43', 60', 65', 72' | Report | Pen: Hoi-ching (1/1) 15' |

The Sevens Stadium, Dubai
Referee: Tyler Miller (Australia)

Team details

| FB | 15 | Keleni Marawa |
| RW | 14 | Luisa Tisolo |
| OC | 13 | Repeka Adi Tove |
| IC | 12 | Adita Milinia |
| LW | 11 | Ivamere Nabura |
| FH | 10 | Kolora Lomani |
| SH | 9 | Salanieta Kinita |
| N8 | 8 | Evivi Senikarivi |
| OF | 7 | Karalaini Naisewa (c) |
| BF | 6 | Sulita Waisega |
| RL | 5 | Asinate Serevi |
| LL | 4 | Mereoni Nakesa |
| TP | 3 | Ana Korovata |
| HK | 2 | Vika Matarugu |
| LP | 1 | Bitila Tawake |
Replacements:
| HK | 16 | Salanieta Nabuli |
| PR | 17 | Tiana Robanakadavu |
| PR | 18 | Aviame Veidreyaki |
| FW | 19 | Alfreda Fisher |
| FW | 20 | Ema Adivitaloga |
| SH | 21 | Setaita Railumu |
| BK | 22 | Litiana Lawedrau |
| | 23 |
Coach:
(Fiji) Mosese Rauluni

| FB | 15 | Fion Got |
| RW | 14 | Sabay Lynam |
| OC | 13 | Chong Ka-yan |
| IC | 12 | Natasha Olson-Thorne |
| LW | 11 | Gabriella Rivers |
| FH | 10 | Lucia Bolton |
| SH | 9 | Fung Hoi-ching |
| N8 | 8 | Jessica Ho |
| OF | 7 | Shanna Forrest |
| BF | 6 | Pun Wai-yan (c) |
| RL | 5 | Micayla Baltazar |
| LL | 4 | Roshini Turner |
| TP | 3 | Kea Herewini |
| HK | 2 | Tanya Dhar |
| LP | 1 | Lau Nga Wun |
Replacements:
| HK | 16 | Tsang Hoi Laam |
| PR | 17 | Lee Ka-shun |
| PR | 18 | Chloe Baltazar |
| BR | 19 | Karen So |
| SH | 20 | Wan Tsz Yau |
| BK | 21 | Zoe Smith |
| BK | 22 | Haruka Uematsu |
| | 23 |
Coach:
(New Zealand) Andrew Douglas

Player of the Match:
Karalaini Naisewa (Fiji)

Assistant referees:
Holly Wood (England)
Jess Ling (Australia)
Television match official:
Dan Jones (England)
Foul play review officer:
Rachel Horton (Australia)

28 September 2024
20:30 GST (UTC+4)

| Netherlands | 8–8 | Samoa |
| Try: Gevers 4'm Pen: Pleuni Kievit (1/1) 8' | Report | Try: Sio 82'm Pen: Cassie Siataga (1/1) 26' |

The Sevens Stadium, Dubai
Referee: Natarsha Ganley (New Zealand)

Team details

| FB | 15 | Lieve Stallmann |
| RW | 14 | Kika Mulling |
| OC | 13 | Linneke Gevers |
| IC | 12 | Pien Selbeck |
| LW | 11 | Gaya van Nifterik |
| FH | 10 | Pleuni Kievit |
| SH | 9 | Esmee Ligtvoet |
| N8 | 8 | Isa Prins |
| OF | 7 | Mariet Luijken |
| BF | 6 | Elisabeth Boot |
| RL | 5 | Inger Jongerius |
| LL | 4 | Linde van der Velden (c) |
| TP | 3 | Nicky Dix |
| HK | 2 | Julia Morauw |
| LP | 1 | Anouk Veerkamp |
Replacements:
| HK | 16 | Anoushka Beukers |
| PR | 17 | Sydney de Weijer |
| PR | 18 | Jara Bunnik |
| FW | 19 | Mhina de Vos |
| FW | 20 | Noah Demba |
| FW | 21 | Morgane Ter Cock |
| CE | 22 | Lisa Egberts |
| FH | 23 | Emma van Traa |
Coach:
(Netherlands) Sylke Haverkorn

| FB | 15 | Drenna Falaniko |
| RW | 14 | Linda Fiafia |
| OC | 13 | Tyra Boysen |
| IC | 12 | France Bloomfield |
| LW | 11 | Davina Lasini |
| FH | 10 | Cassie Siataga |
| SH | 9 | Ana Afuie |
| N8 | 8 | Nina Foaese |
| OF | 7 | Sui Pauaraisa (c) |
| BF | 6 | Utumalama Atonio |
| RL | 5 | Ana-Lise Sio |
| LL | 4 | Easter Savelio |
| TP | 3 | Ana Mamea |
| HK | 2 | Lulu Leuta |
| LP | 1 | Ti Tauasosi |
Replacements:
| HK | 16 | Avau Filimaua |
| PR | 17 | Denise Aiolupotea |
| PR | 18 | Sydney Niupulusu |
| BR | 19 | Joanna Fanene Lolo |
| SH | 20 | Saelua Leaula |
| BK | 21 | Harmony Vatau |
| BK | 22 | Lutia Col Aumua |
| | 23 |
Coach:
(Samoa) Ramsey Tomokino

Player of the Match:
Linde van der Velden (Netherlands)

Assistant referees:
Shanda Assmus (Canada)
Sunny Lee (Hong Kong China)
Television match official:
Rachel Horton (Australia)
Foul play review officer:
Dan Jones (England)

=== Round 2 ===
4 October 2024
19:00 GST (UTC+4)

| Madagascar | 7–38 | Hong Kong China (1 BP) |
| Try: Raharimalala 68' c Con: Razanamahefa (1/1) 68' | Report | Try: G. Rivers 14' c Forrest 30' c Dhar 37' m Smith 51' c Fion Got 61' c Lynam 80' m Con: Smith (4/6) 14', 31', 51', 62' |

The Sevens Stadium, Dubai
Referee: Shanda Assmus (Canada)

Team details

| FB | 15 | Jinah Kelly Razanamahefa |
| RW | 14 | Olivia Hanitriniaina |
| OC | 13 | Veronique Rasoanekena |
| IC | 12 | Valisoa Razanakiniana |
| LW | 11 | Claudia Rasoarimalala |
| FH | 10 | Voahirana Razafiarisoa |
| SH | 9 | Vonjimalala Ranorovololona |
| N8 | 8 | Sarindra Sahondramalala |
| OF | 7 | Delphine Raharimalala |
| BF | 6 | Oliviane Andriatsilavina |
| RL | 5 | Eleonore Rasoanantenaina |
| LL | 4 | Felaniaina Rakotoarison |
| TP | 3 | Fenitra Razafindramanga |
| HK | 2 | Nomenjanahary Rakotozafi |
| LP | 1 | Nanou Razafializay |
Replacements:
| HK | 16 | Mamisoa Rasoarimalala |
| PR | 17 | Laurence Rasoanandrasana |
| PR | 18 | Miora Rabarivelo |
| BR | 19 | Sariaka Nomenjanahary |
| SW | 20 | Volatiana Rasoanandrasana |
| SH | 21 | Joela Mirasoa Fenohasina |
| CE | 22 | Marie Bodonandrianina |
| WG | 23 | Zaya Fanantenana |
Coach:
(Madagascar) Alain Randriamihaja

| FB | 15 | Sabay Lynam |
| RW | 14 | Chong Ka-yan |
| OC | 13 | Natasha Olson-Thorne |
| IC | 12 | Gabriella Rivers |
| LW | 11 | Zoe Smith |
| FH | 10 | Georgia Rivers |
| SH | 9 | Jessica Ho |
| N8 | 8 | Shanna Forrest |
| OF | 7 | Chan Tsz-Ching |
| BF | 6 | Pun Wai-yan |
| RL | 5 | Micayla Baltazar |
| LL | 4 | Roshini Turner |
| TP | 3 | Kea Herewini |
| HK | 2 | Tanya Dhar |
| LP | 1 | Tammy Lau |
Replacements:
| HK | 16 | Yuei-Tein Fion Got |
| PR | 17 | Chan Hiu Tung |
| PR | 18 | Lee Ka-shun |
| LK | 19 | Chloe Baltazar |
| LK | 20 | Chow Mei-nam |
| SH | 21 | Wan Tsz-Yau |
| FH | 22 | Fung Hoi-Ching |
| BK | 23 | Haruka Uematsu |
Coach:
(New Zealand) Andrew Douglas

Player of the Match:
Zoe Smith (Hong Kong)

Assistant referees:
Tyler Miller (Australia)
Mélissa Leboeuf (France)
Television match official:
Maria Heitor (Portugal)
Foul play review officer:
Dan Jones (England)

5 October 2024
18:00 GST (UTC+4)

| Fiji | 17–45 | Samoa (1 BP) |
| Try: Naisewa 18' c Tisolo (2) 44' m, 71' m Con: Tisolo (1/3) 19' | Report | Try: Fiafia 4' m Mamea 21' c Wright-Akeli 55' m Bloomfield (2) 60' c, 67' m Savelio 78' c Con: Siataga (3/6) 22', 61', 79'; Pen: Siataga (3/4) 8', 26', 29' |

The Sevens Stadium, Dubai
Referee: Holly Wood (England)

Team details

| FB | 15 | Luisa Tisolo |
| RW | 14 | Repeka Tove |
| OC | 13 | Adita Milinia |
| IC | 12 | Talei Wilson |
| LW | 11 | Kolora Lomani |
| FH | 10 | Jeniffer Ravutia |
| SH | 9 | Evivi Senikarivi |
| N8 | 8 | Karalaini Naisewa |
| OF | 7 | Sulita Waisega |
| BF | 6 | Alfreda Fisher |
| RL | 5 | Asinate Serevi |
| LL | 4 | Mereoni Nakesa |
| TP | 3 | Vika Matarugu |
| HK | 2 | Loraini Senivutu |
| LP | 1 | Bitila Tawake |
Replacements:
| HK | 16 | Keleni Marawa |
| PR | 17 | Salanieta Nabuli |
| PR | 18 | Tiana Robanakadavu |
| LK | 19 | Aviame Veidreyaki |
| FW | 20 | Salaseini Railumu |
| FW | 21 | Ema Adivitaloga |
| FH | 22 | Salanieta Kinita |
| CE | 23 | Merewairita Neivosa |
Coach:
(Fiji) Mosese Rauluni

| FB | 15 | Karla Wright-Akeli |
| RW | 14 | Linda Fiafia |
| OC | 13 | Tyra Boysen-Auimatagi |
| IC | 12 | Ruby Finau |
| LW | 11 | Drenna Falaniko |
| FH | 10 | Cassie Siataga |
| SH | 9 | France Bloomfield |
| N8 | 8 | Joanna Fanene Lolo |
| OF | 7 | Sui Pauaraisa |
| BF | 6 | Utumalama Atonio |
| RL | 5 | Ana-Lise Sio |
| LL | 4 | Easter Savelio |
| TP | 3 | Tori Iosefo |
| HK | 2 | Avau Filimaua |
| LP | 1 | Denise Aiolupotea |
Replacements:
| HK | 16 | Anastasia Mamea |
| PR | 17 | Ti Tauasosi |
| PR | 18 | Angelica Schwencke |
| BR | 19 | Nina Foaese |
| LK | 20 | Sydney Niupulusu |
| SH | 21 | Ana-Maria Afuie |
| BK | 22 | Harmony Vatau |
| BK | 23 | Tee Aiolupotea |
Coach:
(Samoa) Ramsey Tomokino

Assistant referees:
Natarsha Ganley (New Zealand)
Sunny Lee (Hong Kong China)
Television match official:
Dan Jones (England)
Foul play review officer:
Rachel Horton (Australia)

5 October 2024
20:30 GST (UTC+4)

| Netherlands | 0–20 | Spain |
| | Report | Try: Blanco 47' m Alameda 53' m Castellucci 59' m Con: Argudo (1/3) 54'; Pen: Argudo (1/1) 20' |

The Sevens Stadium, Dubai
Referee: Jess Ling (Australia)

=== Round 3 ===
11 October 2024
19:00 GST (UTC+4)

| (1 BP) Samoa | 46–15 | Madagascar |
| Try: Siataga 8' c Vatau 25' m Fanene Lolo (2) 32' c, 56' m Aiolupotea 44' c Niupulusu 47' c Wright-Akeli 80' m Con: Siataga (4/7) 9', 33', 45', 48'; Pen: Siataga (1/1) 23' | Report | Try: Rasoarimalala 4' m Razanamahefa 36' c Con: Razanamahefa (1/2) 37'; Pen: Razanamahefa (1/1) 52' |

The Sevens Stadium, Dubai

12 October 2024
18:00 GST (UTC+4)

| (1 BP) Netherlands | 33–3 | Hong Kong China |
| Try: Gevers 10' m van Nifterik 15' m Veerkamp 53' m Stallmann 72' c Con: Lemmens (1/2) 73'; Pen: Stallmann (2/2) 42', 48' | Report | Pen: Smith 34' |

The Sevens Stadium, Dubai

12 October 2024
20:30 GST (UTC+4)

| (1 BP) Fiji | 8–10 | Spain |
| Try: Milinia 83' m Pen: Tisolo (1/1) 21' | Report | Try: Capell 36' c Con: Pérez (1/1) 37'; Pen: Pérez (1/1) 77' |

The Sevens Stadium, Dubai

== Statistics ==
=== WXV 1 ===
==== Top points scorers ====
| Pos | Name | Team | Pts |
|---|---|---|---|
| 1 | Alex Tessier | Canada | 22 |
| 2 | Zoe Harrison | England | 21 |
| 3 | Jess Breach | England | 20 |
| 3 | Ellie Kildunne | England | 20 |
| 3 | Katelyn Vaha'akolo | New Zealand | 20 |
| 6 | Erin King | Ireland | 15 |
| 7 | McKenzie Hawkins | United States | 14 |
| 8 | Renee Holmes | New Zealand | 12 |
| 9 | Lina Queyroi | France | 11 |
| 10 | Fancy Bermudez | Canada | 10 |
| 10 | Abigail Dow | England | 10 |
| 10 | Alev Kelter | United States | 10 |
| 10 | Ayesha Leti-I'iga | New Zealand | 10 |
| 10 | Marine Ménager | France | 10 |
| 10 | Kaipo Olsen-Baker | New Zealand | 10 |
| 10 | Hope Rogers | United States | 10 |
| 10 | Helena Rowland | England | 10 |
| 10 | Laetitia Royer | Canada | 10 |
| 10 | Aoife Wafer | Ireland | 10 |

==== Top try scorers ====
| Pos | Name | Team | Tries |
|---|---|---|---|
| 1 | Jess Breach | England | 4 |
| 1 | Ellie Kildunne | England | 4 |
| 1 | Katelyn Vaha'akolo | New Zealand | 4 |
| 4 | Erin King | Ireland | 3 |
| 5 | Fancy Bermudez | Canada | 2 |
| 5 | Abigail Dow | England | 2 |
| 5 | Alev Kelter | United States | 2 |
| 5 | Ayesha Leti-I'iga | New Zealand | 2 |
| 5 | Marine Ménager | France | 2 |
| 5 | Kaipo Olsen-Baker | New Zealand | 2 |
| 5 | Hope Rogers | United States | 2 |
| 5 | Laetitia Royer | Canada | 2 |
| 5 | Aoife Wafer | Ireland | 2 |

=== WXV 2 ===
==== Top points scorers ====
| Pos | Name | Team | Pts |
|---|---|---|---|
| 1 | Maya Stewart | Australia | 20 |
| 2 | Faitala Moleka | Australia | 19 |
| 3 | Ayasa Otsuka | Japan | 15 |
| 3 | Seina Saito | Japan | 15 |
| 5 | Aseza Hele | South Africa | 10 |
| 5 | Asoiva Karpani | Australia | 10 |
| 5 | Ayanda Malinga | South Africa | 10 |
| 5 | Francesca McGhie | Scotland | 10 |
| 5 | Desiree Miller | Australia | 10 |
| 5 | Chloe Rollie | Scotland | 10 |
| 5 | Nadine Roos | South Africa | 10 |
| 5 | Silvia Turani | Italy | 10 |

==== Top try scorers ====
| Pos | Name | Team | Tries |
|---|---|---|---|
| 1 | Maya Stewart | Australia | 4 |
| 2 | Seina Saito | Japan | 3 |
| 3 | Aseza Hele | South Africa | 2 |
| 3 | Asoiva Karpani | Australia | 2 |
| 3 | Ayanda Malinga | South Africa | 2 |
| 3 | Francesca McGhie | Scotland | 2 |
| 3 | Desiree Miller | Australia | 2 |
| 3 | Ayasa Otsuka | Japan | 2 |
| 3 | Chloe Rollie | Scotland | 2 |
| 3 | Silvia Turani | Italy | 2 |

=== WXV 3 ===
==== Top points scorers ====
| Pos | Name | Team | Pts |
|---|---|---|---|
| 1 | Cassie Siataga | Samoa | 31 |
| 2 | Luisa Tisolo | Fiji | 23 |
| 3 | Amàlia Argudo | Spain | 20 |
| 4 | Zahía Pérez | Spain | 16 |
| 5 | Karalaini Naisewa | Fiji | 15 |
| 5 | Clara Piquero | Spain | 15 |
| 7 | Zoe Smith | Hong Kong | 13 |
| 8 | Tina Razanamahefa | Madagascar | 12 |
| 9 | Lieve Stallmann | Netherlands | 11 |
| 10 | Cristina Blanco | Spain | 10 |
| 10 | France Bloomfield | Samoa | 10 |
| 10 | Nadina Cisa | Spain | 10 |
| 10 | Joanna Fanene-Lolo | Samoa | 10 |
| 10 | Linneke Gevers | Netherlands | 10 |
| 10 | Karla Wright-Akeli | Samoa | 10 |

==== Top try scorers ====
| Pos | Name | Team | Tries |
|---|---|---|---|
| 1 | Karalaini Naisewa | Fiji | 3 |
| 1 | Clara Piquero | Spain | 3 |
| 3 | Cristina Blanco | Spain | 2 |
| 3 | France Bloomfield | Samoa | 2 |
| 3 | Nadina Cisa | Spain | 2 |
| 3 | Joanna Fanene-Lolo | Samoa | 2 |
| 3 | Linneke Gevers | Netherlands | 2 |
| 3 | Luisa Tisolo | Fiji | 2 |
| 3 | Karla Wright-Akeli | Samoa | 2 |
| 10 | 34 players | | 1 |
