= 2026 Women's Super League 1 =

- Countries: South Africa
- Number of teams: 8
- Date: 14 February – 4 April 2026
- Champions: Bulls Daisies
- Runners-up: Boland Dames
- Top point scorer: Jakkie Cilliers (92)
- Top try scorer: Thobile Msizazwe (12)

The 2026 Women's Super League 1 is the 2026 of Women's Super League 1, the premier domestic rugby union competition in South Africa. The competition is sponsored by grocery retail chain brand Pick n Pay and organized by the South African Rugby Union.

The 2026 season began in February 2026 with the newly rebranded Pick n Pay Women's Super League 1. The competition was known as the Women's Premier Division from 2019 to 2025.

The Bulls Daisies are defending their title, having won three consecutive titles.

== Teams ==
Location of teams in 2026 SA Cup

The eight competing teams are:

2026 Women's Super League 1
Team	Sponsored name
Bulls Daisies	Isuzu Bulls Daisies
Boland Dames	Sanlam Boland Dames
Border Ladies	—N/a
EP Queens	—N/a
Free State Women	Toyota Free State Cheetahs
Golden Lions Women	—N/a
Sharks Women	Hollywoodbets Sharks Women
Western Province	DHL Women's Western Province

== Regular season ==
=== Standings ===
2026 Women's Super League 1 standings
Pos	Team	Pld	W	D	L	PF	PA	PD	TF	TA	B	Pts	Qualification
1	Bulls Daisies	7	7	0	0	459	52	+407	73	7	7	35	Final
2	Boland Dames	7	6	0	1	223	161	+62	35	26	5	29	Final
3	Western Province	7	5	0	2	245	140	+105	42	22	7	27	
4	EP Queens	7	3	0	4	160	216	−56	26	36	4	16	
5	Golden Lions Women	7	3	0	4	143	276	−133	25	44	3	15	
6	Sharks Women	7	2	0	5	143	195	−52	22	32	4	12	
7	Free State Women	7	2	0	5	148	243	−95	23	39	1	9	
8	Border Ladies	7	0	0	7	69	307	−238	11	51	1	1	

Source: SARU

== Fixtures ==
=== Round 1 ===
14 February 2026	Western Province (1 BP)	51–16	Sharks Women	City Park, Cape Town
13:00	Try: Willemse; Ndou (2); Mcatshulwa; Hanekom; Welman (2); Arries (2); Con: Kruger (3)	Report	Try: Kinsey; Gwala; Comley; Con: Kinsey (2/3)	Referee: Chante Olivier

14 February 2026	Golden Lions Women	12–32	EP Queens (1 BP)	Alberton Rugby Club; Alberton
13:00	Try: Sarah Mokwebo; Siphumelele Mdlalose; Con: Rumandi Potgieter	Report	Try: Lee-Jane Harris; Lukhanye Lolo; Julene Haas; Joanne Boesak; Con: Siphenathi Yeko (3); Pen: Siphenathi Yeko (2)	Referee: Giana Viljoen

14 February 2026	Boland Dames (1 BP)	36–5	Free State Women	Boland Stadium, Wellington
15:00	Try: Arthea King; Tereska Kabuika; Chloe Adams; Felicia Jacobs; Buthle Sonamzi; Rufana Tagarira; Con: Zintle Nonkasana (3)	Report	Try: Sikholiwe Mdletshe	Referee: Siyanda Pikoli

14 February 2026	Border Ladies	0–100	Bulls Daisies (1 BP)	Police Park, East London
15:30		Report	Try: Mpupha (2); Nobanda; Solontsi; Ubisi (2); Janse van Rensburg; Ralebona; Alexander (2); Mkiva; Cilliers; Msizazwe (2); Diliza (2); Con: Janse van Rensburg (6); Cilliers (4)	Referee: Angie Bezuidenhout

=== Round 2 ===
21 February 2026	Sharks Women	3–45	Bulls Daisies (1 BP)	Kings Park 2, Durban
12:00	Pen: Zulu (1)	Report	Try: Mpupha (2); Ubisi; Janse van Rensburg (2); Malone; Msizazwe; Con: Cilliers (5)	Referee: Chante Olivier

21 February 2026	Western Province (1 BP)	53–5	Golden Lions Women	Bellville RFC, Cape Town
13:00	Try: Shaunique Hess (2); Voice Ndou (2); Babalwa Latsha (2); Logan Welman (2); Raeeqah Hendricks; Con: Elmé Kruger (4)	Report	Try: Kamogelo Thloloe	Referee: Siyanda Pikoli

21 February 2026	Free State Women (1 BP)	21–12	EP Queens	Free State Stadium, Bloemfontein
15:00	Try: Kamohelo Makoele (2); Nontobeko Mohuli; Con: Juanine Jacobs (3)	Report	Try: Siphenathi Yeko; Esethu Mbongisa; Con: Siphenathi Yeko (1)	Referee: Angie Bezuidenhout

21 February 2026	Boland Dames (1 BP)	45–21	Border Ladies	Boland Stadium, Wellington
15:00	Try: Felicia Jacobs; Maxene Valentine; Aseza Hele; Ropha Madyah; Veroeshka Grain; Tereske Kabuika; Rufaro Tagarira; Con: Zintle Nonkasana (3); Chloe Adams (1); Rufaro Tagarira (1)	Report	Try: Nombuyekezo Mdliki; Asiphe Mrweqana; Penalty Try; Con: Khanya Ketani (1); Zintle Holofela (1)	Referee: Giana Viljoen

=== Round 3 ===
28 February 2026	Eastern Province Queens (1 BP)	29–19	Sharks Women	Otto du Plessis High School, Gqeberha
11:00		Report		Referee: Giana Viljoe

28 February 2026	Border Ladies	7–24	Western Province (1 BP)	Police Park, East London
13:00	Try: Sesethu Mbodli; Con: Zintle Holofela	Report	Try: Voice Ndou (2); Sinazo Mcatshulwa; Alichia Arries; Con: Elmé Kruger; Anja le Roux	Referee: Yohane Tredoux

28 February 2026	Golden Lions Women (1 BP)	48–32	Free State Women	Alberton Rugby Club, Alberton
13:00		Report		Referee: Siyanda Pikoli

28 February 2026	Bulls Daisies (1 BP)	47–8	Boland Dames	Loftus Versfeld, Pretoria
14:00	Try: Mkhabela; Solontsi (2); Ubisi; Janse van Rensburg; Ndhlovu; Cilliers; Con: Cilliers (6)	Report	Try: Tereske Kabuika; Pen: Chloe Adams	Referee: Angie Bezuidenhout

=== Round 4 ===
7 March 2026	EP Queens	29–41	Boland Dames	Otto du Plessis High School, Gqeberha
13:00	Try: Amber Olivier (2); Olwethu Kasibe; Hlomla Puzi; Julene Haas; Con: Siphenathi Yeko	Report	Try: Aseza Hele (3); Tereske Kabuika (3); Eloise Webb; Con: Chloe Adams; Zintle Nonkosana (2)	Referee: Luvuyo Maceba

7 March 2026	Western Province	22–50	Bulls Daisies	Rosina Paarwater Stadium, Bellville
13:00	Try: Hess; Mxabo; Latsha; Arries; Con: Kruger	Report	Try: Mkhabela; Solontsi; Ubisi; Janse van Rensburg; Ralebona; Alexander; Msizazwe (2); Con: Cilliers (3); Janse van Rensburg (2)	Referee: Siyanda Pikoli

7 March 2026	Golden Lions Women	32–7	Border Ladies	Alberton Rugby Club, Alberton
13:00	Try: Kamogelo Thloloe (2); Xoliswa Khuzwayo; Rumandi Potgieter; Siyonela Macamba; Ntsako Mbombi; Con: Rumandi Potgieter	Report	Try: Zahara Makhomazi; Con: Khanya Ketani	Referee: Chante Olivier

7 March 2026	Free State Women	19–33	Sharks Women	CUT Fields, Bloemfontein
15:00	Try: Anelca Hess (2); Angy Lesele; Con: Anelca Hess (2)	Report	Try: Sinenhlanhla Cebekhulu (2); Owami Zikhali; Cebisa Gumede; Kwanele Zungu; Con: Mary Zulu (4)	Referee: Yohane Tredoux

=== Round 5 ===
14 March 2026	Bulls Daisies	71–5	EP Queens	Loftus Versfeld, Pretoria
11:00	Try: Faith Tshauke (3); Sizophila Solontsi; Chuma Qawe; Camelitha Malone; Robyn Strydom; Jakkie Cilliers; Naima Hlatshwayo; Thobile Msizazwe (2); Con: Jakkie Cilliers (5); Yandisa Nobanda (3)	Report	Try: Yolanda Ntibane	Referee: Yohane Tredoux

14 March 2026	Sharks Women	29–0	Border Ladies	Kings Park 2, Durban
12:00	Try: Lindelwa Gwala (2); Nontobeko Mathupha; Cebisa Gumede (2); Con: Mary Zulu (2)	Report	Try: Yolanda Ntibane	Referee: Siyanda Pikoli

14 March 2026	Golden Lions Women	22–40	Boland Dames	Alberton Rugby Club, Alberton
13:00	Try: Hlobisile Mbatha (2); Sharon Baloyi; Siphumelele Mdlalose; Con: Rumandi Potgieter	Report	Try: Nompumelelo Mathe; Buhle Sonamzi; Aseza Hele; Ropha Madyah; Veroeshka Grain; Rufaro Tagarira; Con: Chloe Adams (3); Zintle Nonkosana	Referee: Chante Olivier

14 March 2026	Free State Women	21–38	Western Province	CUT Fields, Bloemfontein
15:00	Try: Kamohelo Makoele; Lonele Fuzile; Nontobeko Mohuli; Con: Anelca Hess	Report	Try: Donelle Snyders; Voice Ndou (2); Faith Gosling; Babalwa Latsha; Logan Welman; Con: Donelle Snyders (4)	Referee: Giana Viljoen

=== Round 6 ===
21 March 2026	EP Queens	36–15	Border Ladies	Nelson Mandela Bay Stadium, Gqeberha
13:00	Try: Amahla Nyoba; Olwethu Kasibe; Phelisa Mrwebi; Anacadia Minnaar; Julene Haas; Joanne Boesak; Con: Julene Haas (3)	Report	Try: Unathi Mali; Aviwe Basana	Referee: Ayanda Ngombane

21 March 2026	Sharks Women	18–19	Golden Lions Women	Kings Park 2, Durban
13:45	Try: Nobuhle Mjwara; Nomonde Mbanjwa; Con: Zulu; Pen: Zulu (2)	Report	Try: Siyonela Macamba; Zonke Sethi; Aretha Thomo; Con: Rumandi Potgieter; Kirsten Cox	Referee: Yohane Tredoux

21 March 2026	Boland Dames	21–15	Western Province	Boland Stadium, Wellington
15:00	Try: Mihlali Mgweba; Felicia Jacobs; Arthea King; Con: Zintle Nonkosana; Chloe Adams (2)	Report	Try: Zandiswa Xozwa; Donelle Snyders; Con: Elmé Kruger; Pen: Elmé Kruger	Referee: Siyanda Pikoli

21 March 2026	Free State Women	9 –52	Bulls Daisies	Shimla Park B-Field, Bloemfontein
15:00	Pen: Anelca Hess (3)	Report	Try: Vainah Ubisi; Robyn Strydom; Naima Hlatshwayo; Jakkie Cilliers; Shaunique Alexander; Chuma Qawe; Yonela Ngxingolo; Lucky Nkhumishe; Con: Cilliers (3); Pen: Cilliers (2)	Referee: Chante Olivier

=== Round 7 ===
27 March 2026	Sharks Women	22–32	Boland Dames	Kings Park Stadium, Durban
14:45	Try: Cebisa Gumede; Kwanele Zungu (2); Reneilwe Masiavhula; Con: Mary Zulu	Report	Try: Rufaro Tagarira (2); Chloe Adams; Aseza Hele; Sinalo Ziqwayi; Con: Chloe Adams (2); Pen: Chloe Adams	Referee: Thabiso Mbatha

28 March 2026	Bulls Daisies	94–5	Golden Lions Women	Loftus Versfeld, Pretoria
11:00	Try: Zintle Mpupha; Doreen Mkhabela; Faith Tshauke; Sizophila Solontsi; Vainah Ubisi; Lebogang Ralebona; Camelitha Malone (2); Shaunique Alexander (2); Naima Hlatshwayo; Thobile Msizazwe (4); Xolelwa Diliza; Con: Jakkie Cilliers (4); Zintle Mpupha (3)	Report	Try: Xoliswa Khuzwayo	Referee: Precious Pazani

28 March 2026	EP Queens	17–42	Western Province	Otto du Plessis High School, Gqeberha
13:00	Try: Yolanda Ntibane; Lithalethu Nombakuse; Ruzanne George; Con: Julene Haas	Report	Try: Anelisiwe Mxabo (3); Sinazo Mcatshulwa; Raeeqah Hendricks; Alichia Arries; Logan Welman; Faith Gosling; Con: Donelle Snyders	Referee: Yohane Tredoux

28 March 2026	Border Ladies	24–41	Free State Women	Police Park, East London
15:30	Try: Nombuyekezo Mdliki; Aphiwe Ngwevu (2); Zintle Holofela; Con: Zintle Holofela (2)	Report	Try: Natasha Motlomelo; Sikholiwe Mdletshe; Bernice Strydom; Anelca Hess (2); Anita Tom; Vuyelwa Mosala; Con: Anelca Hess (3)	Referee: Siyanda Pikol

== Final ==
4 April 2026
11:00

Bulls Daisies	36–14	Boland Dames
Try: Vainah Ubisi; Zintle Mpupha; Shaunique Alexander (2); Lebogang Ralebona; Thobile Msizazwe; Con: Libbie Janse van Rensburg (2); Jakkie Cilliers (1)	Report	Try: Felicia Jacobs; Maxene Valentine; Con: Chloe Adams (1); Pen: Chloe Adams (1)

Loftus Versfeld, Pretoria
Referee: Giana Viljoen

Bulls Daisies	Boland Dames

Bulls Daisies:
FB	15	Chuma Qawe
RW	14	Shaunique Alexander
OC	13	Zintle Mpupha
IC	12	Naima Hlatshwayo
LW	11	Thobile Msizazwe
FH	10	Libbie Janse van Rensburg
SH	9	Unam Tose
N8	8	Sophy Mashapa
BF	7	Anathi Qolo (c)
OF	6	Sizophila Solontsi
RL	5	Vainah Ubisi
LL	4	Dineo Ndhlovu
TP	3	Azisa Mkiva
HK	2	Doreen Mkhabela
LP	1	Yonela Ngxingolo
Substitutes:
HK	16	Xolelwa Diliza
PR	17	Sanelisiwe Charlie
PR	18	Lebogang Ralebona
LK	19	Sinelitha Noxeke
BR	20	Ziyanda Ngohlekana
SH	21	Camelitha Malone
FH	22	Jakkie Cilliers
CE	23	Noxolo Magasela
Coach:
Hayden Groepes

Boland Dames:
FB	15	Chloe Adams
RW	14	Arthea King
OC	13	Veroeshka Grain
IC	12	Rufaro Tagarira
LW	11	Sinalo Ziqwayi
FH	10	Eloise Webb
SH	9	Felicia Jacobs
N8	8	Aseza Hele (c)
BF	7	Ropha Madyah
OF	6	Buhle Sonamzi
RL	5	Thandi Masuku
LL	4	Mihlali Mgweba
TP	3	Onaka Jita
HK	2	Keishia Stuurman
LP	1	Yola Lumko
Substitutes:
HK	16	Maxene Michelay Valentine
PR	17	Zena Swart
PR	18	Carolishia Fisher
BR	19	Nompumelelo Mathe
BR	20	TJ Ngxowa
SH	21	Zintle Nonkasana
CE	22	Lulu Tyibilika
FB	23	Tereske Kabuika
Coach:
Thomas Chowles

Assistant Referees:
Siyanda Pikoli
Chante Olivier

== See also ==
- 2026 Currie Cup Premier Division
