= Ayanda Malinga =

South African rugby union and sevens player

- Born: 23 June 1998 (age 28)
- Height: 167 cm (5 ft 6 in)
- Weight: 68 kg (150 lb; 10 st 10 lb)

Rugby union career
- Position: Wing
Senior career
Years	Team	Apps	(Points)
2023–2025	Bulls Daisies		(0)
International career
Years	Team	Apps	(Points)
2022–	South Africa	17	(80)
- Correct as of 22 September 2025
National sevens team
Years	Team		Comps
	South Africa		9 (10 pts)

Ayanda Malinga (born 23 June 1998) is a South African rugby union and sevens player. She plays for the Bulls Daisies in South Africa's Women's Premier Division. She has represented South Africa at international level in fifteens and sevens.

== Career ==
Malinga represented South Africa at the 2022 Rugby World Cup Sevens in Cape Town. She was named in the Springbok women's sevens side for the 2023 Dubai Women's Sevens.

She was a member of the South African side that competed at the 2024 Summer Olympics in Paris. She returned to the Springbok Women's fifteens squad for the 2024 WXV 2 tournament after her last appearance in 2022.

On 9 August 2025, she was named in the Springbok women's squad to the Women's Rugby World Cup.
