= Anne Fernández de Corres =

Spanish rugby union player

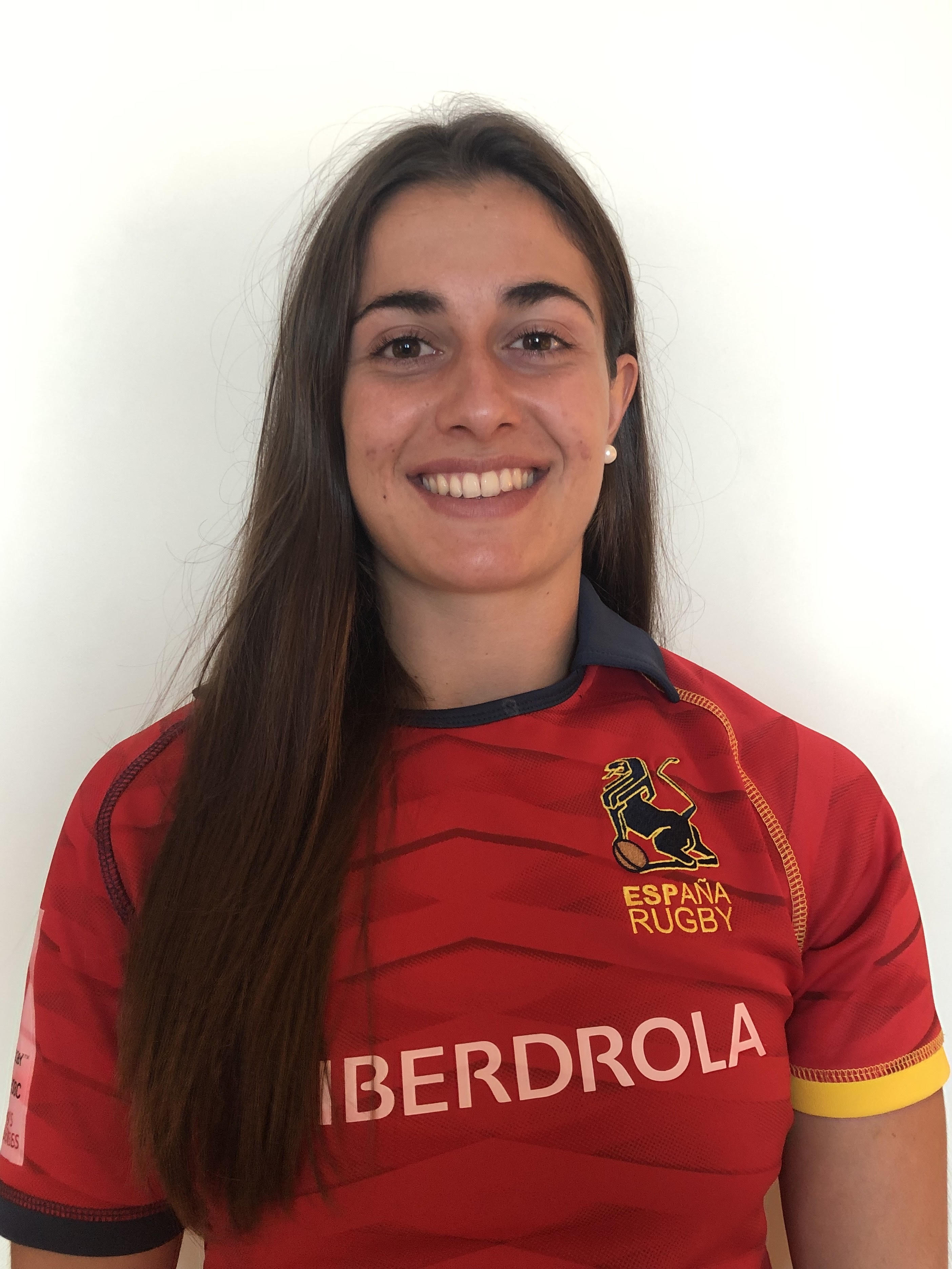
- Fernández de Corres in 2020
- Full name: Anne Fernández de Corres Del Rio
- Born: 30 May 1998 (age 28) Vitoria-Gasteiz, Basque Country, Spain
- Height: 158 cm (5 ft 2 in)
- Weight: 60 kg (132 lb)
- University: Technical University of Madrid

Rugby union career
- Position: Scrum-half
Senior career
Years	Team	Apps	(Points)
2014-2016	Gaztedi Rugby Taldea (es)		(0)
2016-2019	CR Cisneros		(0)
2021-2022	Eibar Rugby Taldea (es)		(0)
International career
Years	Team	Apps	(Points)
2015–	Spain	39	(35)
National sevens team
Years	Team		Comps
2015–	Spain		83

Anne Fernández de Corres Del Río (born 30 May 1998) is a Spanish rugby union and sevens player. She currently plays for Eibar Rugby Taldea and for the Spanish women's national team. She competed for Spain at the 2017 and 2025 Women's Rugby World Cups.

== Career ==
Fernández de Corres played at the 2017 Women's Rugby World Cup in Ireland. She also competed in the 2016 and 2018 Rugby Europe Women's Championship. She has played for Gaztedi and Cisneros.

In 2024, she was selected for the Spanish side that competed in the WXV 3 tournament in Dubai.

On 11 August 2025, she was named in the Spanish squad to the Women's Rugby World Cup in England.
