= Chumisa Qawe =

South African rugby union player

- Born: 15 November 1999 (age 26)
- Height: 166 cm (5 ft 5 in)
- Weight: 81 kg (179 lb)

Rugby union career
- Position: Centre
Senior career
Years	Team	Apps	(Points)
–2022	Western Province		(0)
2023–	Bulls Daisies		(0)
International career
Years	Team	Apps	(Points)
2021–	South Africa	24	(20)
- Correct as of 14 September 2025

Chumisa Qawe (born 15 November 1999) is a South African international rugby union player. She plays centre for the Bulls Daisies and South Africa.

== Biography ==
Chumisa Qawe was born on 15 November 1999. She is the twin sister of fellow South African player Chuma.

In 2022 she played for the Western Province. She already had 9 caps for the national team when she was selected in September 2022 to play for her country in the Rugby World Cup in New Zealand.

In 2023, she signed with the Bulls Daisies.

She was named in South Africa's squad to the 2025 Women's Rugby World Cup in England.
