= Chuma Qawe =

South African rugby union player

- Born: 15 November 1999 (age 26)
- Height: 166 cm (5 ft 5 in)
- Weight: 66 kg (146 lb)

Rugby union career
- Position: Outside Back
- Current team: Bulls Daisies
Senior career
Years	Team	Apps	(Points)
–2023	Western Province		(0)
2024–	Bulls Daisies		(0)
International career
Years	Team	Apps	(Points)
2021–	South Africa		

Chuma Qawe (born 15 November 1999) is a South African international rugby union player who plays as a wing or fullback.

== Biographie ==
Chuma Qawe was born on November 15, 1999. She is the twin sister of rugby union player Chumisa Qawe.

In 2022 she played for the Western Province. She already had 9 caps for the national team when she was selected in September 2022 to play for her country in the Rugby World Cup in New Zealand.

Chuma signed for the Bulls Daisies in November 2024.
