= Zintle Mpupha =

South African cricketer and rugby union player

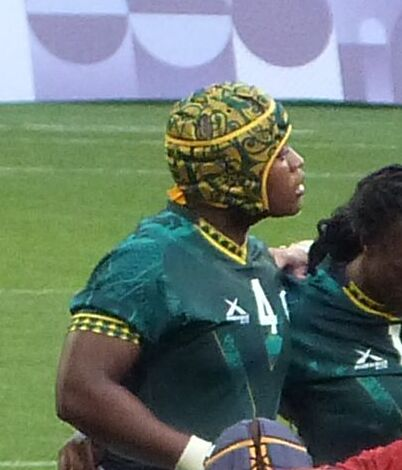
- Mpupha at the 2024 Olympics
- Born: 25 December 1993 (age 32) Xesi, Cape Province, South Africa
- Height: 1.61 m (5 ft 3 in)
- Weight: 69 kg (152 lb)

Rugby union career
- Position: Fly Half
- Current team: Bulls Daisies
Senior career
Years	Team	Apps	(Points)
2021–2023	Exeter Chiefs		(0)
2023–	Bulls Daisies		
2026	Delhi Redz		
International career
Years	Team	Apps	(Points)
2018–	South Africa	29	(106)
- Correct as of 14 September 2025
National sevens team
Years	Team		Comps
2013–	South Africa		

Zintle Mpupha (born 25 December 1993) is a South African women's rugby union player and cricketer from Middledrift, Eastern Cape, South Africa. She played cricket for Border cricket team and rugby for Border Bulldogs as well as the South Africa women's national rugby sevens team as a fly half.

== Rugby career ==
Mpupha played rugby for Border Bulldogs. In 2013 she was first called up to the South Africa national women's rugby sevens team. However, due to studying for a degree at the University of Fort Hare, she stopped playing rugby sevens and started playing rugby union while at university. In 2016, after graduating, Mpupha returned to the South Africa rugby sevens team. In 2017, she was offered a professional contract with the South Africa women's national rugby sevens team. This meant that she had to move to Stellenbosch, Western Cape to train with the team which meant she was unable to continue playing for either the Border cricket or rugby teams.

In 2021 she became the first South African to play in the Premier 15s after she signed with Exeter Chiefs Women.

Mpupha was selected to represent South Africa at the 2022 Rugby World Cup Sevens in Cape Town. She was also named in South Africa's women's fifteens team for the Rugby World Cup in New Zealand.

She was a member of the South African side that competed at the 2024 Summer Olympics in Paris. In September, she was called into South Africa's fifteens squad for the 2024 WXV 2 tournament.

On 9 August 2025, she was named in South Africa's squad to the Women's Rugby World Cup.

== Cricket ==
Mpupha started playing cricket and played for the Border cricket team's under-19s when she was 14 and made her cricket debut for the Border cricket team in 2011. Following this she was called up to the South Africa national women's under-19 cricket team.
