= Karalaini Naisewa =

Fiji international rugby union player

- Born: 23 July 1994 (age 32)
- Height: 167 cm (5 ft 6 in)
- Weight: 89 kg (196 lb; 14 st 0 lb)
- Notable relative(s): Luke Tagi (brother); Keleni Marawa (sister)

Rugby union career
- Position: Loose Forward
Super Rugby
Years	Team	Apps	(Points)
2022–	Fijiana Drua	25	(30)
International career
Years	Team	Apps	(Points)
2018–	Fiji	31	(55)

Karalaini Naisewa (born 23 July 1994) is a Fijian rugby union player. She competed for Fiji at the delayed 2021 Rugby World Cup.

== Personal life ==
Naisewa's older sister, Keleni Marawa, and younger brother, Luke Tagi, have both represented Fiji at an international level.

== Super Rugby Women's ==
Naisewa scored a try when the Fijiana Drua made their debut in the 2022 Super W season. It was against the Melbourne Rebels in the opening round of the competition.

She scored the winning try during the 2023 Super W season final against the Queensland Reds which helped her side claim back-to-back Super W titles.

She captain's the Fijian Drua Women's team in the Super Rugby Women's competition.

== International career ==
Naisewa was selected in the Fijiana side for the delayed 2021 Rugby World Cup in New Zealand. She scored the winning try in Fiji's first-ever World Cup victory which was against South Africa.

In July 2024, she returned from an ankle injury which she sustained during the Oceania Championship to lead the Fijiana's against the Wallaroos. In September, she led the side when they got their first WXV win, they defeated Hong Kong in the opening round of the WXV 3 tournament in Dubai.

On 9 August 2025, she was named in the Fijiana squad for the Women's Rugby World Cup in England.
