= Luke Tagi =

Fijian rugby union player

- Full name: Luke Tagi
- Born: 23 June 1997 (age 29) Gau Island, Fiji
- Height: 187 cm (6 ft 2 in)
- Weight: 130 kg (287 lb; 20 st 7 lb)
- School: Ratu Kadavulevu High School
- Notable relative: Karalaini Naisewa (sister)

Rugby union career
- Position: Tighthead Prop
- Current team: Aviron Bayonnais
Youth career
- 20??-2018: Suva Rugby
Senior career
Years	Team	Apps	(Points)
2018	Fijian Drua	8	(0)
2019	Fijian Latui	4	(10)
2019-2021	Stade Français	22	(0)
2021-2023	Provence Rugby	45	(40)
2023-	Aviron Bayonnais	7	(5)
- Correct as of 30 January 2024
International career
Years	Team	Apps	(Points)
2018	Fiji under-20	3	(0)
2018-2019	Fiji Warriors	8	(15)
2020-	Fiji	15	(0)
- Correct as of 30 January 2024

Luke Tagi (born 23 June 1997) is a Fijian rugby union player who plays as a Tighthead prop at Bayonne in the Top 14.

== Club career ==
In 2019 he signed a three-season contract for Top 14 side Stade Français, making his debut in a 46–16 loss to Castres.

== International career ==
He played for the Fijian under-20s side in the IRB Junior World rugby Trophy. He also spent time playing in the Fijia Warriors side (Fiji A side).

He made his debut for the national side against Georgia in 2021. He was selected in the squad for the 2023 Rugby World Cup.
