= Lucy Dinnen =

Australia international rugby union player

- Born: 9 February 1993 (age 33)
- Height: 165 cm (5 ft 5 in)
- Weight: 69 kg (152 lb; 10 st 12 lb)

Rugby union career
- Position: Loose Forward
Senior career
Years	Team	Apps	(Points)
2019–2022	Worcester Warriors		
Super Rugby
Years	Team	Apps	(Points)
2022–2023	Queensland Reds		
2024–	Western Force		
International career
Years	Team	Apps	(Points)
2024–	Australia	5	(0)

Lucy Dinnen (née Lockhart; born 9 February 1993) is an Australian rugby union player. She represents Australia at an international level. She plays for the Western Force in the Super Rugby Women's competition, and previously played for the Queensland Reds. She has also played for Worcester Warriors in the Premier 15s.

== Rugby career ==
At the age of 21, Dinnen was called up for a training camp with the Wallaroos to prepare for the 2014 Women's Rugby World Cup. However, it took her ten years before she made her debut for Australia.

Having returned to her best form in 2021, she was voted Super Rugby Women's Player of the Year. She was naturally called up to prepare for the 2021 World Cup, but the competition was postponed due to the COVID-19 pandemic, and she also became pregnant.

In early 2022, she gave birth to her daughter Zoe. She only had five months to prepare for the delayed World Cup in New Zealand. She tried, but her body couldn't cope with the strain of intensive training, after a conversation with the Head coach at the time, she decided to withdraw from playing.

In 2023, an ankle injury forced her to miss the Super Rugby Women's season. She searched for a team that would allow her to combine rugby and motherhood, the Western Force offered their services, so she moved to Perth with her husband and two-year-old daughter. There, she rediscovered the joy of playing that she had unknowingly lost. She previously played for the Queensland Reds team.

At the end of summer 2024, she was selected for the Australian national team for their tour of Europe and the WXV 2 tournament in South Africa. On September 14, she made her international debut for the Wallaroos against Ireland in Belfast.

== Personal life ==
Dinnen is a corporal in the Australian Army, her military deployments made her less available at a time when international competitions were rare for women. She is also a science teacher and goes on educational missions to Africa, which notably led to her contracting malaria in 2020.
