= Misaki Matsumura =

Japan international rugby union player

- Born: 6 March 2005 (age 21)
- Height: 169 cm (5 ft 7 in)
- Weight: 72 kg (159 lb; 11 st 5 lb)

Rugby union career
- Position: Wing
Senior career
Years	Team	Apps	(Points)
- Tokyo Sankyu Phoenix
International career
Years	Team	Apps	(Points)
2023–	Japan	15	(42)
National sevens team
Years	Team		Comps
- Japan 7s

Misaki Matsumura (born 6 March 2005) is a Japanese rugby union player. She competed for Japan at the 2025 Women's Rugby World Cup.

== Early life and career ==
Matsumura lived in Hong Kong until the age of five and grew to love rugby through touch rugby. She enrolled at Chitose Junior High School which had a rugby club, so she decided to enroll there. She attended Kanto Gakuin Mutsuura High School and played for their team.

== Rugby career ==
While she was still in High School, she played for Japan's women's national sevens team. She had also won the national championship during her high school years. After attending Waseda University, she joined Tokyo Sankyu Phoenix.

In 2023, she made her international fifteens debut for Japan against Fiji, she scored two tries in the match. In her first three matches she scored five tries. In 2024, she featured for the side again and scored tries in their tour match against Italy, and in the WXV 2 tournament against Wales.

On 28 July 2025, she was named in the Japanese side to the Women's Rugby World Cup in England. She was the youngest squad member at the tournament at 20.
