= Tayla Kinsey =

- Born: 5 September 1993 (age 33)
- Height: 165 cm (5 ft 5 in)
- Weight: 65 kg (143 lb; 10 st 3 lb)

Rugby union career
- Position: Scrum-half
Senior career
Years	Team	Apps	(Points)
	Sharks Women		(0)
International career
Years	Team	Apps	(Points)
2013–	South Africa	41	(53)
- Correct as of 14 September 2025

Tayla Kinsey (born 5 September 1993) is a South African rugby union player. She plays for the Sharks Women in the Women's Premier Division and for the South Africa women's national rugby union team.

== Early career ==
Kinsey developed a love for rugby at an early age when she joined her brother's club, Hillcrest Villages Rugby Club and played for them before she turned ten. She also played touch rugby in high school from Grade 10.

She played 15-a-side club rugby after school and was a standout which earned her a place in the South African U20 Women's team in 2013.

== Rugby career ==
Kinsey made her international debut for South Africa in 2013. She eventually became the youngest player in the South African team when she competed at the 2014 Women's Rugby World Cup at the age of 20.

She joined English club, Aylesford Bulls, in the Women's Premiership for the 2014–15 and 2015–16 seasons.

In 2022, she was selected in the South African side to the delayed 2021 Rugby World Cup in New Zealand.

Kinsey was named in the Springbok Women's squad to the 2025 Women's Rugby World Cup that will be held in England.
