= Lucia Scott =

English-born Scottish international rugby union player

- Born: 2 March 2004 (age 22) Gloucester, Gloucestershire, England
- Height: 1.67 m (5 ft 5 1/2 in)
- Weight: 62 kg (137 lb; 9 st 11 lb)

Rugby union career
- Position: Fullback
- Current team: Loughborough Lightning
Amateur team(s)
| Years | Team | Apps | (Points) |
| – | Bicester RUFC | | |
| – | Witney RFC | | |
| – | Gosford RFC | | |
Senior career
| Years | Team | Apps | (Points) |
| 2021–2025 | Gloucester-Hartpury | 5 | (5) |
| 2024– | Edinburgh | 9 | (17) |
| 2025– | Loughborough Lightning | | |
International career
| Years | Team | Apps | (Points) |
- England U18
- Scotland U20
| 2024– | Scotland | 5 | (5) |
- Correct as of 25 June 2025

Anna-Lucia Scott (born 2 March 2004), is an English-born Scottish rugby union player who often plays fullback. She plays for Loughborough Lightning in Premiership Women's Rugby, and for Edinburgh in Celtic Challenge as well as the Scotland national team.

== Early life and career ==
Born in Oxford, Oxfordshire Scott previously played for England U18 at fly-half and centre. She qualifies to play for Scotland through her Scottish Grandparents. Scott has played for the Hartpury University team where she won two British Universities and Colleges Sport titles.

== Rugby career ==
Scott made her international debut in a warm-up match against Wales on 6 September 2024. She scored her first international try in her second appearance against Fiji a week later. She was also named in Scotland's squad for the WXV 2 tournament in South Africa.

She was selected for Scotland's squad for the 2025 Six Nations Championship in March.

She signed for Loughborough Lightning in June 2025.
