= Jakkie Cilliers =

South African rugby union and sevens player

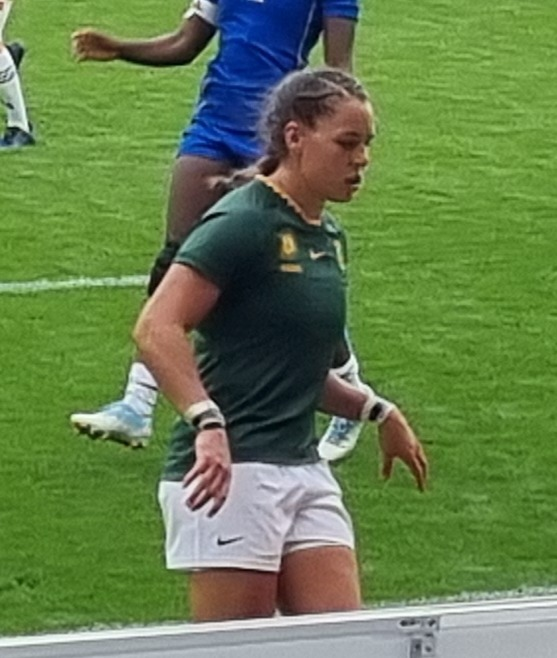
- 2025 Rugby World Cup in Northampton
- Born: Jacomina Cilliers; 30 October 2000 (age 26) Free State, South Africa
- Height: 175 cm (5 ft 9 in)
- Weight: 84 kg (185 lb)
- University: North-West University

Rugby union career
- Position(s): Wing, Centre
- Current team: RC Toulon PM
Senior career
Years	Team	Apps	(Points)
2023–2026	Bulls Daisies		
2026–	RC Toulon PM		
International career
Years	Team	Apps	(Points)
2023–	South Africa	29	(168)
- Correct as of 13 October 2026
National sevens team
Years	Team		Comps
2022–	South Africa		

Jacomina 'Jakkie' Cilliers, (born 30 October 2000) is a South African international rugby union and rugby sevens player who plays as a centre or winger. She plays for the Bulls Daisies.

== Biography ==
Jakkie Cilliers was born on 30 October 2000. Cilliers describes herself as a “farm girl” from the Free State. The eldest of three siblings, she is the only girl.

In 2022, she plays Blue Bulls Women's for the Pretoria. She had only two caps for South Africa when she was selected in September 2022 to play in the World Cup in New Zealand.

In 2023, she was selected to play the first edition of the WXV.

In 2024, she was called up again to compete in the WXV. Injured against Australia, she missed the last match against Italy.

With the Bulls Daisies, she won three national titles in a row. In 2025, she was voted best player in the South African Championship, of which she finished as top point scorer (127 points).

She was named in the Springbok Women's squad to the 2025 Women's Rugby World Cup that was held in England.

In July 2026, she signed with RC Toulon PM.
