= Sinazo Mcatshulwa =

South African rugby union player

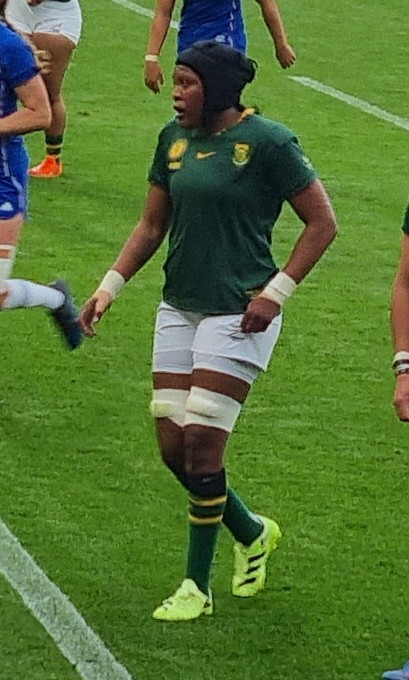
- 2025 Rugby World Cup in Northampton
- Born: 24 December 1996 (age 29)
- Height: 174 cm (5 ft 9 in)
- Weight: 79 kg (174 lb; 12 st 6 lb)

Rugby union career
- Position: Loose Forward
International career
Years	Team	Apps	(Points)
2018–	South Africa	42	(60)
- Correct as of 14 September 2025
National sevens team
Years	Team		Comps
2019–	South Africa		

Sinazo Mcatshulwa (born 24 December 1996) is a South African rugby union player. She represented South Africa at the 2021 Rugby World Cup.

== Early career ==
Mcatshulwa started playing rugby in primary school in Langa, she also played hockey and netball. She played club rugby for the Busy Bees.

== Rugby career ==
Mcatshulwa made her test debut for South Africa against Wales in 2018. She was a member of the Springbok Women's Sevens team in 2019.

She was part of the Springbok Women's XVs side that played against France in Vannes in 2021.

In 2022, she was selected in South Africa's squad for the delayed 2021 Rugby World Cup in New Zealand.

Mcatshulwa had a stint with French club, Lille Métropole RC Villeneuvois, in the Élite 1 competition in 2024. She was the first South African female to play for a French club. She has played for the Western Province in the Women's Premier Division.

She was named in the Springbok Women's squad to the 2025 Women's Rugby World Cup that will be held in England.
