= Iroha Nagata =

Japan international rugby union player

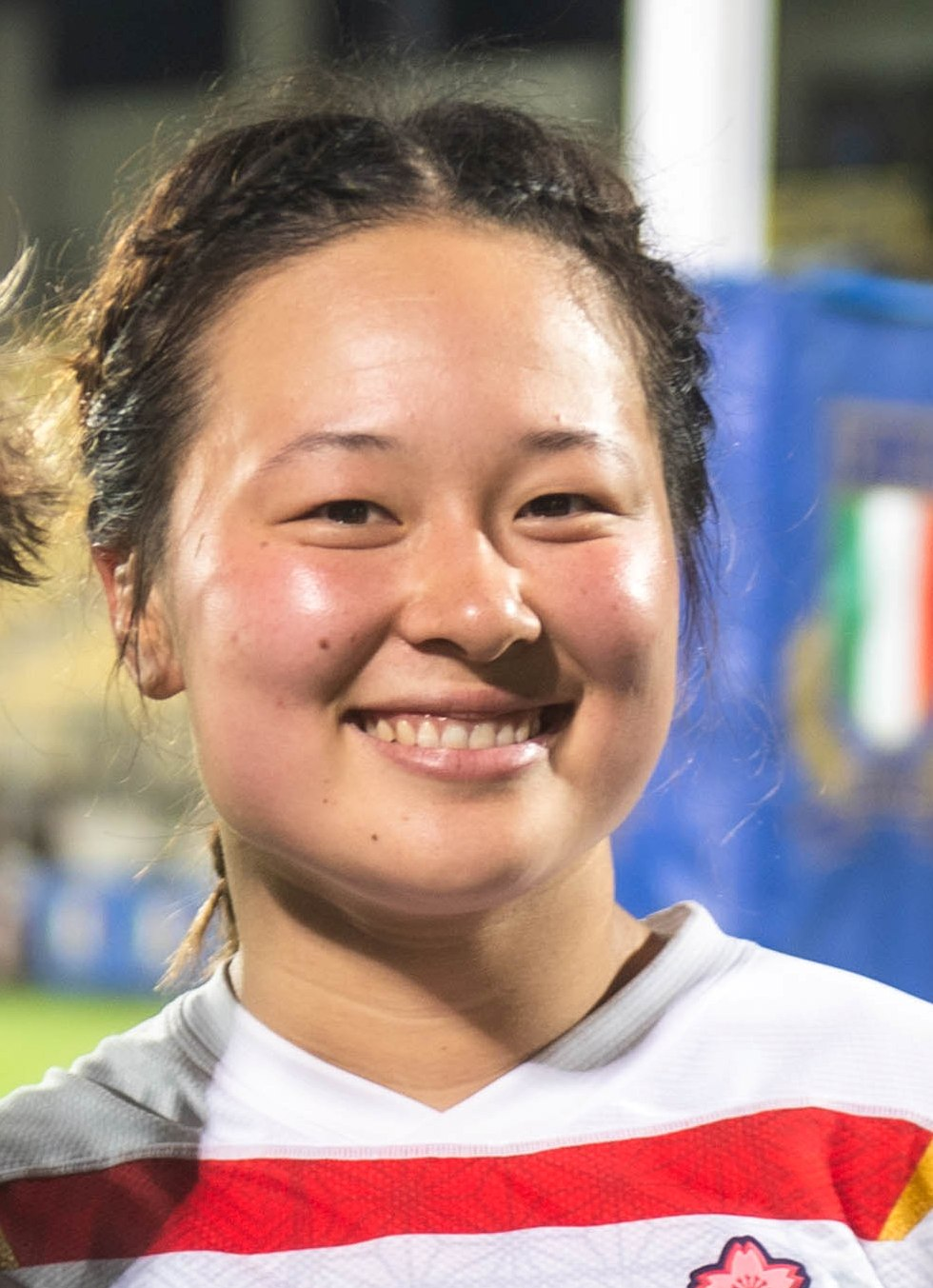
- Nagata in 2023, after Japan's test against Italy
- Born: 21 December 1998 (age 27)
- Height: 167 cm (5 ft 6 in)
- Weight: 62 kg (137 lb; 9 st 11 lb)

Rugby union career
- Position: Back row
Senior career
Years	Team	Apps	(Points)
	Arukas Queen Kumagaya		(0)
International career
Years	Team	Apps	(Points)
2016–	Japan	43	(70)
National sevens team
Years	Team		Comps
	Japan		15
Medal record
Women's rugby sevens
Representing Japan
Asian Games
Gold medal – first place	2018 Jakarta	Team

Iroha Nagata (born 21 December 1998) is a Japanese rugby union and sevens player. She competed for Japan at the 2017, 2021 and the 2025 Women's Rugby World Cups.

== Early life ==
Nagata was born in Kokurakita-ku, Fukuoka. She attended Moji Gakuen High School and graduated in 2017. She then entered Rissho University which she graduated from in 2021.

== Rugby career ==
In July 2017, she was selected for the Japan women's rugby team for the Rugby World Cup in Ireland.

In 2022, she competed for the Japan women's national team at the delayed 2021 Rugby World Cup in New Zealand.

Nagata also participated in the two-test series against the United States in August 2024. She subsequently captained the Sakura fifteens at the 2024 WXV 2 tournament in South Africa.

In 2025, she was named in the Sakura fifteens squad for their tour to the United States. She eventually led her side in their 39–33 victory over the Eagles in Los Angeles on 26 April.

On 28 July 2025, she was named in the Japanese side to the Women's Rugby World Cup in England.
