= Aurélie Groizeleau =

French rugby union referee and former player

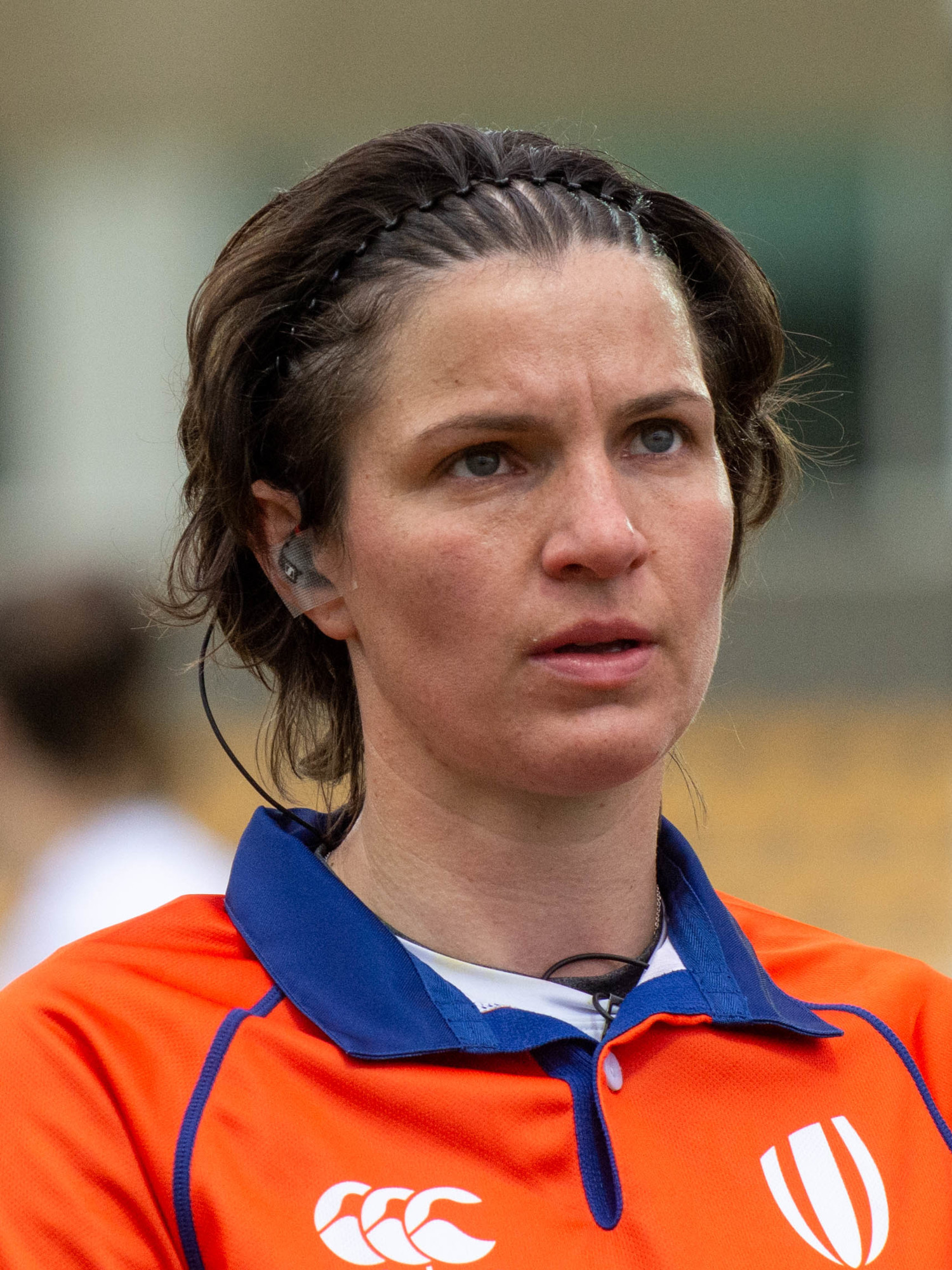
- Groizeleau officiating in 2021
- Born: 27 February 1989 (age 37) La Rochelle, France
- Height: 1.68 m (5 ft 6 in)
- Weight: 68 kg (150 lb)

Rugby union career
Senior career
Years	Team	Apps	(Points)
–2007	Blagnac		
- Correct as of 20 April 2021
International career
Years	Team	Apps	(Points)
	France	5	
- Correct as of 20 April 2021
National sevens team
Years	Team		Comps
- France
- Correct as of 18:04, 28 April 2021 (UTC)
Refereeing career
Years	Competition		Apps
- Women's Premier
2015–2017	Fédérale 2		
2018–	Internationals		
2019–	Women's Six Nations		
2021–	Rugby Pro D2		
- Correct as of 20 April 2021

Aurélie Groizeleau (born 27 February 1989) is a French rugby union referee and former player, who has officiated at international level since 2018. As a player, she made five appearances for the France women's national rugby union team and five appearances for the France women's national rugby sevens team.

== Playing career ==
At club level, Groizeleau played for Blagnac. She made five appearances for the France women's national rugby union team, and five appearances for the France women's national rugby sevens team. In 2007, Groizeleau suffered a serious injury that later forced her to retire from playing rugby, at the age of 19. Before her injury, Groizeleau had been hoping to represent France at the 2008 Women's Six Nations Championship.

== Officiating career ==
Groizeleau started officiating at the age of 21. She was initially an assistant referee, before becoming a main referee. She started her career in the men's Fédérale 2 league, and now officiates in the men's Fédérale 1 and Top 14 leagues, as well as the French women's Premier Division. She also officiates Rugby Europe Women's Sevens rugby sevens matches. When she started officiating rugby union matches, she was one of four fully qualified French female referees. Groizeleau is coached by French male referee Jérôme Garcès.

In 2016, Groizeleau officiated an under-20s match between France and England. In November 2017, Groizeleau was the assistant referee for two matches between France and New Zealand. In November 2018, Groizeleau officiated her first international rugby match, between Italy and South Africa. Groizeleau was chosen to officiate at the 2019 Women's Six Nations Championship; her first match in the competition was the March 2019 match between England and Italy. At the time of her appointment, she was one of six female international referees. She was selected as an official for the 2020 Women's Six Nations Championship, initially for two matches as main referee, and two matches as assistant referee. Later in the year, she was chosen to referee a match between France and England, after Irish official Joy Neville was injured. Groizeleau was selected as an official for the 2021 Women's Six Nations Championship, for two matches as main referee, and one match as an assistant referee.

On 1 September 2021, Groizeleau signed a semi-professional contract with the French Rugby Federation (FFR). That month, she officiated two matches in the 2021 Rugby World Cup qualifying European tournament in Italy. In October 2021, Groizeleau started officiating in the men's Rugby Pro D2.

In May 2022, Groizeleau was selected as a referee for the delayed 2021 Rugby World Cup. She was selected as an assistant referee for the 2021 Rugby World Cup Final.

== Personal life ==
Groizeleau is from La Rochelle, Charente-Maritime, and now lives in Marans, Charente-Maritime. Aside from rugby, Groizeleau works as a farmer; she breeds almost 7,000 pairs of pigeons at her parents' house. Groizeleau spends three hours a week studying English. Her partner is a rugby union assistant referee in the men's Rugby Pro D2 and Fédérale 1 leagues. Groizeleau has one daughter.
