= Nel Metcalfe =

Welsh international rugby union player

- Born: 17 December 2004 (age 21) Bangor, Wales
- Height: 168 cm (5 ft 6 in)
- Weight: 65 kg (143 lb; 10 st 3 lb)

Rugby union career
- Position(s): Wing, Fullback
- Current team: Gloucester-Hartpury
Amateur team(s)
Years	Team	Apps	(Points)
–2023	Nant Conwy RFC		
Senior career
Years	Team	Apps	(Points)
2023–2024	Gwalia Lightning		
2024–	Gloucester-Hartpury	15	(45)
- Correct as of 20 January 2025
International career
Years	Team	Apps	(Points)
–2024	Wales U20		
2023–	Wales	16	(20)
- Correct as of 24 September 2025

Nel Metcalfe (born 17 December 2004) is a Welsh international rugby union player for Gloucester-Hartpury in Premiership Women's Rugby, as well as the Wales national team.

== Rugby career ==
Metcalfe was born on 17 December 2004 in Bangor, Wales.

Until 2023, she played for Nant Conwy RFC. In October 2023, aged 18, she made her debut for Wales against the United States and was included in the squad that would travel to New Zealand for the 2023 WXV competition. Her first international start was against New Zealand.

Following the WXV tournament, In December 2023 she was announced in the Gwalia Lightning squad for the 2023–24 Celtic Challenge.

In January 2024, she played her first games for Gloucester-Hartpury in Premiership Women's Rugby after impressing in the Celtic Challenge. In March, she scored a hat-trick against Harlequins and was selected in the Squad for the 2024 Women's Six Nations.

In June 2024, she was called up to the Wales under-20 team to play in the Six Nations Summer Series. She was re-called into the senior Welsh side for the 2025 Six Nations Championship in March.

On 11 August 2025, she was selected in the Welsh squad to the Women's Rugby World Cup in England.
