= Dannah O'Brien =

Irish rugby Union player

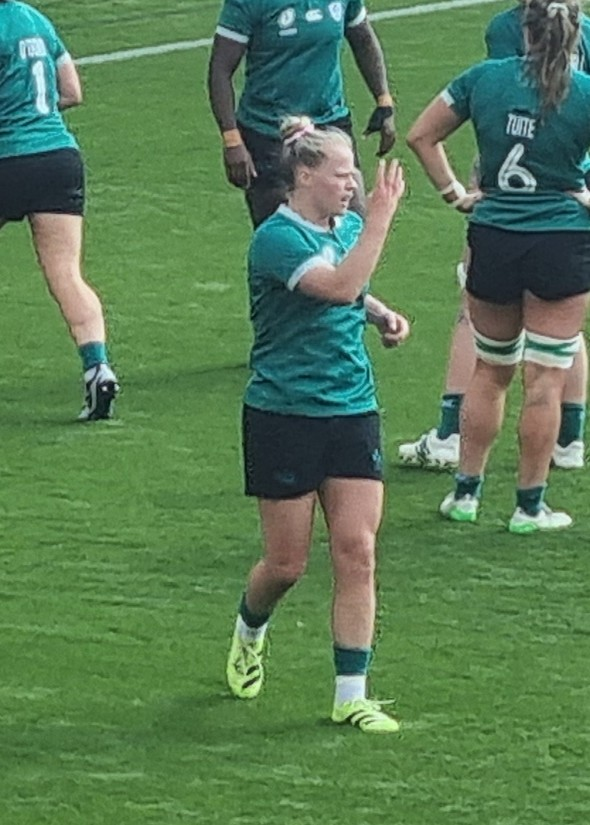
- O'Brien during the 2025 Rugby World Cup in Northampton
- Born: 22 September 2003 (age 23)
- Height: 168 cm (5 ft 6 in)

Rugby union career
- Position: Fly Half
Senior career
Years	Team	Apps	(Points)
	Old Belvedere RFC		(0)
Provincial / State sides
Years	Team	Apps	(Points)
2023-	Leinster Rugby		(0)
International career
Years	Team	Apps	(Points)
2022–	Ireland	30	(143)
- Correct as of 14 September 2025

Dannah O'Brien (born 22 September 2003) is an Irish rugby union player who plays fly half for Leinster and Ireland.

== Early life ==
From Tullow, she played Gaelic Football for Carlow at intercounty level before committing to rugby.

== Club career ==
She plays domestic rugby for Old Belvedere, and made her Leinster Rugby debut in January 2023.

== International career ==
She made her debut for Ireland women's national rugby union team against Japan in 2022 at the age of 19 years-old. She signed her first professional contract with the Irish Rugby Football Union in November 2022.

She was selected in the Ireland squad to compete at the WXV1 tournament in Canada in September 2024. She made a number or successful conversions including the winning kick as they beat world champions New Zealand 29–27 at the competition on 29 September 2024.

O'Brien was named in Ireland's side for the 2025 Six Nations Championship in March. She was named in the Irish squad for the 2025 Rugby World Cup in England.

== Personal life ==
She studied Accounting & Finance in Dublin City University.
