= Desiree Miller (rugby union) =

- Born: 13 January 2002 (age 24) Sydney, Australia
- Height: 163 cm (5 ft 4 in)
- Weight: 67 kg (148 lb; 10 st 8 lb)
- School: MLC Burwood

Rugby union career
- Position: Wing
Super Rugby
Years	Team	Apps	(Points)
2023–	NSW Waratahs	17	(85)
International career
Years	Team	Apps	(Points)
2023–	Australia	23	(77)

Desiree Miller (born 13 January 2002) is an Australian rugby union player. She plays for Australia internationally and for the NSW Waratahs in the Super Rugby Women's competition.

== Early life and career ==
Miller is a former state level gymnast, she went to school in Hong Kong with her father Anthony, a former rugby player, working overseas. She participated in swimming, diving, soccer, basketball, netball, athletics and hockey as a youngster.

Her aunt Gail Miller won a gold medal at the 2000 Olympic Games in Sydney as part of the Australian water polo team while her uncle Paul represented Australia in boxing.

She graduated from MLC Burwood in 2019. She studied for a double degree in psychology and cognitive science at university.

== Rugby career ==
Miller took up rugby union at age 19, she played for Eastern Suburbs and league with Leichhardt Wanderers in 2021 and 2022.

In 2023, she made her debut for the NSW Waratahs. She later made her international debut for the Wallaroos against England on 20 October at the WXV tournament.

Miller scored a hat-trick for the NSW Waratahs in the 2024 Super Rugby Women's grand final against the Fijiana Drua. She then produced a record-equalling four tries against Fiji during the Wallaroos July test series. She was only the second Wallaroo to score four tries in a test, the first was Ruan Sims who scored four against South Africa in 2006.

In 2025, she was called into the Wallaroos side for the Women's Rugby World Cup in England.

== Personal life ==
In March 2026, Miller starred in the reality TV show Rivals: Sport vs. Sport representing "Team Rugby Union".
