= Women's Super League 1 =

Rugby union competition in South Africa

- Current season, competition or edition: 2026 Women's Super League 1
- Formerly: Women's Premier Division
- Sport: Rugby union
- Founded: 2003; 23 years ago
- No. of teams: 8
- Country: South Africa
- Most recent champion: Bulls Daisies
- Relegation to: Women's Super League 2
- Website: sarugby.co.za

The Women's Super League 1 (WSLR), currently known as Pick n Pay Women's Super League 1 for sponsorship purposes, is a rugby union club competition for women that is played in South Africa. it is supported by the South African Rugby Union (SARU).

== History ==
The first South African Inter-Provincial Women's Rugby tournament was held in August 2002 in Port Elizabeth and was won by Falcons. The first women rugby union championship was launched in April 2003 under the name of SARU Women's Interprovincial Championship.

In 2018 SARU decided to reform the Championship which was renamed the Women's Premier Division. Western Province won in 2019 and Border Ladies won in 2021 for the fifth time.

In May 2023, the Bulls Daisies became the first professional women's rugby side in South Africa. They swept to the 2023 title, winning all 14 games.

The 2026 season begins in February 2026 with the newly rebranded Pick n Pay Women's Super League 1.

== Teams ==
Women's Super League 1
Team	Home base	Region
Boland Dames	Wellington	Northern and central districts of the Western Cape province
Border Ladies	East London	Eastern districts of the Eastern Cape province
Bulls Daisies	Pretoria	City of Tshwane
Eastern Province Queens	Gqeberha	Western districts of the Eastern Cape province
Free State Women	Bloemfontein	Central and western districts of the Free State province
Golden Lions Women	Johannesburg	Johannesburg and the West Rand
Sharks Women	Durban	The entire KwaZulu-Natal province
Western Province	Cape Town	Cape Town metropolitan area

Women's Super League 2
Team	Home base	Region
Limpopo Blue Bulls Women	Polokwane	The entire Limpopo province
Griffons Women	Welkom	Northern and eastern districts of the Free State province
Griquas Women	Kimberley	The entire Northern Cape province
Leopards Women	Potchefstroom	The entire North West province
Pumas Women	Mbombela	The entire Mpumalanga province
SWD Eagirls	George	Eastern districts of the Western Cape province
Valke Women	Kempton Park	The East Rand and other municipalities to the east and south of Johannesburg

== List of winners ==
=== SARU Women's Interprovincial Tournament winners ===
Season	Winners	Score	Runner-up	Venue
2002	Falcons	–	KwaZulu-Natal	Port Elizabeth

=== SARU Women's Interprovincial Championship winners ===
Season	Winners	Score	Runner-up	Venue
2003	Blue Bulls	39–0	Eastern Province	Loftus Versfeld Stadium, Pretoria
2004	Blue Bulls	48–0	Eastern Province	Loftus Versfeld Stadium, Pretoria
2005	Blue Bulls	22–3	Eastern Province	
2006	Blue Bulls	69–13	Western Province	
2007	Eastern Province	22–13	Blue Bulls	
2008	Eastern Province	32–8	Border Ladies	
2009	Eastern Province	29–0	Blue Bulls	
2010	Western Province	26–12	Golden Lions	
2011	Eastern Province	29–18	Blue Bulls	Theo Marais Stadium, Cape Town
2012	Western Province	26–20	Blue Bulls	
2013	Border Ladies	41–8	Western Province	Buffalo City Stadium, East London
2014	Border Ladies	32–14	Blue Bulls	Buffalo City Stadium, East London
2015	Border Ladies	20–9	Blue Bulls	Buffalo City Stadium, East London
2016	Border Ladies	29–16	Western Province	
2017	Western Province	17–15	Border Ladies	
2018	Western Province	18–12	Border Ladies	

=== Women's Premier Division winners ===
Season	Winners	Score	Runner-up	Venue
2019	Western Province	38–32	Border Ladies	
2020	Not held due to the COVID-19 pandemic in South Africa			
2021	Border Ladies	24–15	Western Province	Newlands Stadium, Cape Town
2022	Border Ladies	19–16	Western Province	Hamilton Rugby Club, Cape Town
2023	Bulls Daisies	69–8	Western Province	Loftus Versfeld B field, Pretoria
2024	Bulls Daisies	36–17	Western Province	Loftus Versfeld, Pretoria
2025	Bulls Daisies	46–31	Western Province	Loftus Versfeld, Pretoria

=== Women's Super League 1 ===
Season	Winners	Score	Runner-up	Venue	Ref
2026	Bulls Daisies	36–15	Boland Dames	Loftus Versfeld, Pretoria	

=== Women's Super League 2 ===
Season	Winners	Score	Runner-up	Venue	Ref
2026	Griquas	31–25	Pumas	Mbombela Stadium, Nelspruit	
