= Bulls Daisies =

South African women's rugby team

- Union: Blue Bulls Rugby Union
- Nickname: Daisies
- Founded: 2023
- Location: Tshwane, South Africa
- Region: Gauteng
- Ground: Loftus Versfeld (Capacity: 51000)
- CEO: Edgar Rathbone
- President: Willem Strauss
- Coach: Zenay Jordaan
- Captain: Anathi Qolo
- League: Women's Super League 1
- 2026: Champions

Largest win
- Border Ladies 0–100 Bulls Daisies (14 February 2026)

Official website
- bullsrugby.co.za

The Bulls Daisies (known for sponsorship reasons as the Isuzu Bulls Daisies) are the first professional women's team in South African rugby union and are based at Loftus Versfeld Stadium in Pretoria, participating in the annual Women's Super League 1 tournament under the auspices of SA Rugby.

The team are affiliated with the men's rugby team, the Bulls, and the Daisies in their name refer to the Barberton Daisy, which first appeared in the Bulls crest in 1938 and continues to be a prominent franchise insignia.

== Leadership ==
Since 2023, Hayden Groepes has been the head coach of the side, winning both championships under his guidance. In season 1, Groepes was assisted by Mandisa Williams and in Season 2, he was assisted by Aschin Klein.

In 2024, the Daisies added Bongiwe Nhleko and former Springbok star Zenay Jordaan as assistant coaches.

Lusanda Dumke has been the captain of the side since the 2023 season.

== History ==
In 2023, their first season since turning professional, the Bulls Daisies won the Women's Premier Division, winning all fourteen games, and defeating Western Province 69–8 in the final.

In 2024, the Daisies successfully defended their Women's Premier Division title with a second consecutive victory [36-17] in the final over DHL Western Province in Pretoria. Western Province, were the only team in 2024 to beat the Daisies in their league fixture. The other teams in the competition in 2024 were the Golden Lions Women, EP Queens, Sanlam Boland Dames, Sharks Women and the Free State Women.

== Primary sponsor ==
Since 2026, the team's main sponsor has been automobile manufacturer company Isuzu.

== Honours ==
- Women's Premier Division / Women's Super League 1
  - Winners: 2023, 2024, 2025, 2026
- SARU Women's Interprovincial Championship winners
  - Winners: 2003, 2004
