= 2023 WXV =

2023 edition of the WXV women's rugby union tournament

WXV 2023

Tournament details
- Host: New Zealand (WXV 1); South Africa (WXV 2); United Arab Emirates (WXV 3)
- Dates: 13 October — 4 November 2023
- Teams: 18 (6 in 3 divisions each)
- Website: wxvrugby.com

The 2023 WXV was the first edition of WXV, a women's international rugby union group tournament for senior national teams organised by World Rugby, and took place between 13 October and 4 November. The competition featured three divisions of six nations each, evenly divided across two pools. Participating teams were determined by regional competitions and play-in matches. Wellington, Dunedin, and Auckland in New Zealand hosted the first-division WXV 1. Stellenbosch and Cape Town in South Africa hosted WXV 2, and Dubai in the United Arab Emirates hosted WXV 3.

England, Scotland and Ireland respectively won their competitions by all going unbeaten, while Scotland edged Italy by points difference.

== Format ==
The competition was a group tournament featuring a league system of three divisions with six teams each: WXV 1, WXV 2 and WXV 3. Within each division, the six teams were evenly divided into two pools; teams played a match against each team in the other pool. World Rugby tournaments typically award four competition points to teams for winning a match, two points for a draw, and no points for a loss. A bonus point is also awarded for scoring four or more tries in a match, or losing by seven or less match points. Classification tiebreakers are decided in order of: the result of matches between tied teams, match points difference, tries difference, match points for, tries for, and world rank. At the end of the competition, promotion and relegation between the regional position of the first-placed WXV 3 team and the regional position of the last-placed WXV 2 team will occur ahead of the next edition. The last-placed team in WXV 3 will also play-off against the team with the highest world rank that did not participate in the competition, for a spot in WXV 3 in the next edition. No promotion or relegation between WXV 1 and WXV 2 will take place in the inaugural season.

== Qualification ==
Qualified teams by division: WXV 1 WXV 2 WXV 3

WXV 1
- England (1)
- New Zealand (2)
- France (3)
- Canada (4)
- Australia (5)
- Wales (6)
WXV 2
- United States (7)
- Italy (8)
- Scotland (9)
- Japan (10)
- South Africa (12)
- Samoa (15)
WXV 3
- Ireland (11)
- Spain (13)
- Kazakhstan (18)
- Fiji (19)
- Kenya (23)
- Colombia (25)
World rank at the beginning of the competition in brackets

Participants in the competition were determined by regional competitions and play-offs matches staged in 2023. The top three teams of that year's Six Nations and Pacific Four series were placed in WXV 1. The fourth-placed team in both tournaments were placed in WXV 2 alongside that year's African, Asian and Oceanian champions; their runners-up were placed in WXV 3 alongside the sixth-placed Six Nations team. The winners of a play-in between the fifth-placed Six Nations team and the European champions were placed in WXV 2, while the losers were placed in WXV 3 alongside the winners of a play-off between the only two active Sudamérica Rugby women's national teams, Brazil and Colombia.

The South American play-off was a two-match series on 5 and 9 July in Medellín, Colombia. It was preceded by the 2023 Americas Rugby Trophy, the first South American tournament for women's national teams sanctioned by World Rugby. A match in the tournament between Brazil and Colombia was decided by a late try by Juliana Soto, helping Colombia win 18–15. It was the closest Brazil had ever come to defeating Colombia up to that point. In the opening match, Colombia scored thrice before half-time, including a double from Valentina Álvarez. Brazil mounted a comeback in the second half though, as the pressure of two yellow cards on Colombia's defence helped facilitate a controversial late try by Lohana Valente; evidence that she had grounded the ball was unclear. However, the attempt to convert it failed, and the match ended with Colombia leading the series by a single point. The second match was decisive, with Colombia scoring four unanswered tries, including a hat-trick by Leidy Soto, who was recognised as critical in Colombia's victory. Two late penalty tries for Brazil were not enough to overcome the 54–42 aggregate score, and thus Colombia earned qualification to WXV 3.

The European play-off was a single match between Italy and Spain on 22 July in Piacenza, Italy. Italy played their first game at the Stadio Walter Beltrametti and made a comfortable four-try defeat of Spain, and consequently earning qualification to WXV 2. Despite a notable offensive effort early in the second half, Spain failed to score a single point in the match, settling for a place in WXV 3.

=== Play-offs ===
==== WXV 3 final qualification ====
5 July 2023
15:00 COT (UTC−5)

Colombia	24–23 (Note: Colombia win 54–42 and qualify for WXV 3)	Brazil
Try: Álvarez (2) 15' c, 40' +2 c Gutiérrez 21' c Con: Arzuaga (3/3) 16', 22', 40' +3; Pen: Arzuaga (1/1) 55'	Report	Try: Santini 34' m Gomes 45' c Valente 74' c Con: Valente (1/2) 46'; Pen: Valente (2/2) 12', 67'

Estadio Cincuentenario, Medellín
Referee: Federico Solari (Argentina)

9 July 2023
15:00 COT (UTC−5)

Brazil	19–30	Colombia
Try: Campos 6' m Penalty try (2) 76', 80' +1	Report	Try: Soto (3) 36' m, 47' m, 52' c Mestra 70' c Con: Arzuaga (2/4) 53', 71'; Pen: Arzuaga (2/2) 4', 19'

Estadio Cincuentenario, Medellín
Referee: Federico Solari (Argentina)

==== WXV 2/WXV 3 play-off match ====
22 July 2023
19:30 CEST (UTC+2)

Italy	23–0 (Note: Italy are placed in WXV 2 and Spain in WXV 3.)	Spain
Try: Giordano 35' m D'Incà 40' +2 m Vecchini 60' m Granzotto 71' m Pen: Sillari (1/1) 3'	Report

Stadio Walter Beltrametti, Piacenza
Attendance: 1,035
Referee: Aimee Barrett-Theron (South Africa)

== Match officials ==
World Rugby named the following 18 referees, one assistant referee and seven television match officials:

WXV 1
Referees

- Aimee Barrett-Theron (South Africa)
- Maggie Cogger-Orr (New Zealand)
- Sara Cox (England)
- Hollie Davidson (Scotland)
- / Lauren Jenner (Italy/New Zealand)
- Amber McLachlan (Australia)

Television match officials

- Rachel Horton (Australia)
- Andrew McMenemy (Scotland)
- Ian Tempest (England)

WVX 2
Referees

- Natarsha Ganley (New Zealand)
- Aurélie Groizeleau (France)
- Clara Munarini (Italy)
- Kat Roche (United States)
- Precious Pazani (Zimbabwe)
- Holly Wood (England)

Television match officials

- Leo Colgan (Ireland)
- Quinton Immelman (South Africa)

WXV 3
Referees

- Doriane Domenjo (France)
- Ella Goldsmith (Australia)
- Ano Kuwai (Japan)
- Maria Latos (Germany)
- Amelia Luciano (United States)
- Adele Robert (Belgium)

Assistant Referees

- Sunny Lee (Hong Kong)

Television match officials

- Andrew Hosie (Canada)
- Matteo Liperini (Italy)

== WXV 1 ==
2023 WXV 1

Tournament details
- Host: New Zealand
- Dates: 20 October — 4 November 2023
- Teams: Australia; Canada; England; France; New Zealand; Wales

Final positions
- Champions: England (1st title)
- Runner-up: Canada

Tournament statistics
- Matches played: 9
- Tries scored: 69 (7.67 per match)
- Top scorer(s): (Canada) Sophie de Goede (28)
- Most tries: (England) Lark Atkin-Davies (5)

The 2023 WXV 1 was staged in New Zealand between 20 October and 4 November. The first round took place at Wellington's Regional Stadium, the second round at Forsyth Barr Stadium in Dunedin, and the final round at Mount Smart Stadium in Auckland. (Note: During the competition, the Wellington Regional Stadium was as "Sky Stadium", and Mount Smart Stadium as "Go Media Stadium Mt Smart".) England, France and Wales played matches against Australia, Canada and New Zealand.

2023 WXV 1 table
Pos	Team	Pld	W	D	L	PF	PA	PD	TF	TA	TB	LB	Pts
1	England (C)	3	3	0	0	120	31	+89	18	5	3	0	15
2	Canada	3	2	0	1	83	87	−4	12	12	2	0	10
3	Australia	3	2	0	1	61	81	−20	9	12	2	0	10
4	New Zealand (H)	3	1	0	2	99	58	+41	16	8	1	1	6
5	France	3	1	0	2	58	75	−17	7	10	0	0	4
6	Wales	3	0	0	3	48	137	−89	7	22	0	1	1

(C) Champions; (H) Host

=== Round 1 ===
20 October 2023
19:00 NZDT (UTC+13)

(1 BP) England	42–7	Australia
Try: Botterman 5' c Wyrwas 18' c M. Packer (2) 30' c, 49' c Breach 38' c Jones 57' c Con: Aitchison (6/6) 6', 18', 31', 38', 49', 58'	Report	Try: Marsters 54' c Con: Dallinger (1/1) 55'

Wellington Regional Stadium, Wellington
Referee: Lauren Jenner (Italy/New Zealand)

Team details

FB	15	Helena Rowland
RW	14	Abigail Dow
OC	13	Megan Jones		(substituted off) 58'
IC	12	Tatyana Heard		(substituted off) 61'
LW	11	Jess Breach
FH	10	Holly Aitchison
SH	9	Ella Wyrwas		(substituted off) 61'
N8	8	Alex Matthews		(substituted off) 58'
OF	7	Marlie Packer (c)
BF	6	Maisy Allen
RL	5	Zoe Aldcroft		(substituted off) 48'
LL	4	Rosie Galligan
TP	3	Maud Muir		(substituted off) 56'
HK	2	Connie Powell		(substituted off) 56'
LP	1	Hannah Botterman		(substituted off) 56'
Replacements:
HK	16	Lark Atkin-Davies		(substituted on) 56'
PR	17	Mackenzie Carson		(substituted on) 56'
PR	18	Kelsey Clifford		(substituted on) 56'
LK	19	Sarah Beckett	(yellow card) 80' to end'	(substituted on) 48'
FL	20	Daisy Hibbert-Jones		(substituted on) 58'
SH	21	Natasha Hunt		(substituted on) 61'
CE	22	Sophie Bridger		(substituted on) 58'
FB	23	Emma Sing		(substituted on) 61'
Coach:
(England) Louis Deacon

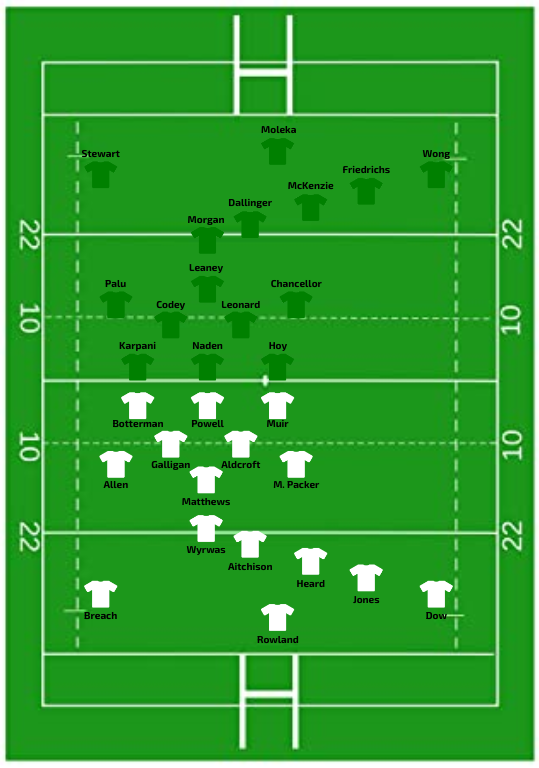

FB	15	Faitala Moleka
RW	14	Maya Stewart		(substituted off) 18'
OC	13	Georgina Friedrichs
IC	12	Arabella McKenzie
LW	11	Ivania Wong
FH	10	Carys Dallinger		(substituted off) 61'
SH	9	Layne Morgan		(substituted off) 73'
N8	8	Kaitlan Leaney
OF	7	Emily Chancellor
BF	6	Siokapesi Palu		(substituted off) 50'
RL	5	Annabelle Codey	(yellow card) 29' to 39'	(yellow card) 57' (yellow-red card)
LL	4	Michaela Leonard (c)		(substituted off) 66'
TP	3	Asoiva Karpani		(substituted off) 66'
HK	2	Tania Naden		(substituted off) 50'
LP	1	Brianna Hoy		(substituted off) 50'
Replacements:
HK	16	Adiana Talakai		(substituted on) 50'
PR	17	Bree-Anna Cheatham		(substituted on) 50'
PR	18	Emily Robinson		(substituted on) 66'
LK	19	Atasi Lafai		(substituted on) 66'
FL	20	Ashley Marsters		(substituted on) 50'
SH	21	Sarah Dougherty		(substituted on) 73'
CE	22	Cecilia Smith
WG	23	Desiree Miller		(substituted on) 18'
Coach:
(Australia) Jay Tregonning

Player of the Match:
Holly Aitchison (England)

Assistant referees:
Maggie Cogger-Orr (New Zealand)
Taneika Uerata (New Zealand)
Television match official:
Andrew McMenemy (Scotland)

Notes:

- Daisy Hibbert-Jones (England) and Brianna Hoy, Sarah Dougherty and Desiree Miller (all Australia) made their international debuts.

21 October 2023
16:00 NZDT (UTC+13)

(1 BP) Canada	42–22	Wales
Try: de Goede 4' c Svoboda 31' c Grant 37' c Hunt 50' c Boag 67' c Lachance 78' c Con: de Goede (6/6) 5', 32', 38', 51', 67', 80'	Report	Try: Phillips 8' c G. Evans 39' c Callender 74' m Con: Bevan (2/3) 9', 40'; Pen: Bevan (1/1) 28'

Wellington Regional Stadium, Wellington
Referee: Sara Cox (England)

Team details

FB	15	Maddy Grant
RW	14	Florence Symonds	(substituted off) 58'
OC	13	Shoshanah Seumanutafa
IC	12	Alex Tessier
LW	11	Sarah-Maude Lachance
FH	10	Claire Gallagher	(substituted off) 70'
SH	9	Olivia Apps	(substituted off) 58'
N8	8	Sophie de Goede (c)
OF	7	Sara Svoboda
BF	6	Gabby Senft	(substituted off) 76'
RL	5	Laetitia Royer
LL	4	Tyson Beukeboom	(substituted off) 70'
TP	3	Alex Ellis	(substituted off) 47'
HK	2	Emily Tuttosi	(substituted off) 51'
LP	1	McKinley Hunt	(substituted off) 64'
Replacements:
HK	16	Gillian Boag	(substituted on) 51'
PR	17	Brittany Kassil	(substituted on) 64'
PR	18	DaLeaka Menin	(substituted on) 47'
LK	19	Ashlynn Smith	(substituted on) 70'
FL	20	Sara Cline	(substituted on) 76'
SH	21	Justine Pelletier	(substituted on) 58'
CE	22	Julia Schell	(substituted on) 70'
WG	23	Krissy Scurfield	(substituted on) 58'
Coach:
(France) Kévin Rouet

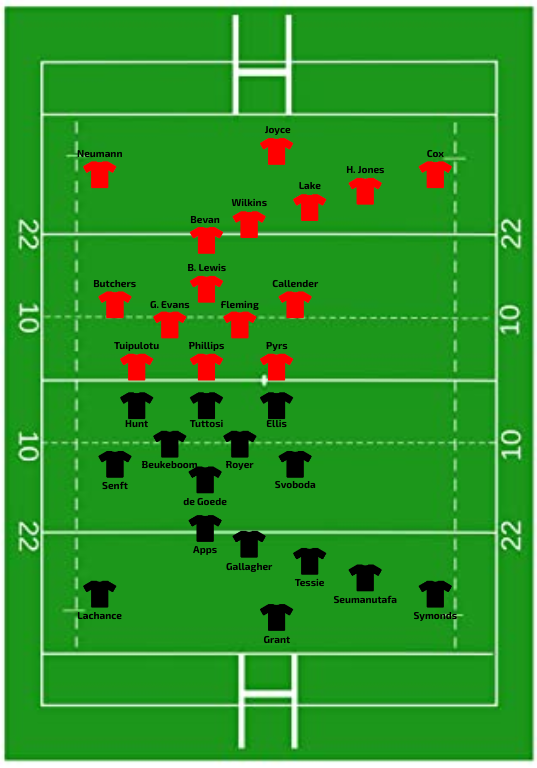

FB	15	Jasmine Joyce
RW	14	Lisa Neumann
OC	13	Hannah Jones (c)
IC	12	Kerin Lake
LW	11	Carys Cox	(substituted off) 64'
FH	10	Robyn Wilkins	(substituted off) 67'
SH	9	Keira Bevan	(substituted off) 76'
N8	8	Bethan Lewis
OF	7	Alex Callender
BF	6	Alisha Butchers	(substituted off) 57'
RL	5	Georgia Evans	(substituted off) 47'	(substituted on) 63'
LL	4	Abbie Fleming		(substituted off) 63'
TP	3	Sisilia Tuipulotu	(substituted off) 51'
HK	2	Carys Phillips	(substituted off) 57'
LP	1	Gwenllian Pyrs	(substituted off) 70'
Replacements:
HK	16	Kelsey Jones	(substituted on) 57'
PR	17	Abbey Constable	(substituted on) 70'
PR	18	Donna Rose	(substituted on) 51'
LK	19	Kate Williams	(substituted on) 47'
N8	20	Sioned Harries	(substituted on) 57'
SH	21	Megan Davies	(substituted on) 76'
FH	22	Lleucu George	(substituted on) 67'
WG	23	Carys Williams-Morris	(substituted on) 64'
Coach:
(Wales) Ioan Cunningham

Player of the Match:
Sophie de Goede (Canada)

Assistant referees:
Maggie Cogger-Orr (New Zealand)
Taneika Uerata (New Zealand)
Television match official:
Rachel Horton (Australia)

Notes:

- DaLeaka Menin (Canada) earned her 50th test cap.
- Courtney Holtkamp was originally to start on the Canada bench, but withdrew before kick-off. She was replaced by Sara Cline.

21 October 2023
19:00 NZDT (UTC+13)

(1 BP) New Zealand	17–18	France
Try: Mikaele-Tu'u 11' c Vaha'akolo 72' c Con: Holmes (1/1) 12'; Demant (1/1) 73'; Pen: Holmes (1/1) 56'	Report	Try: Boulard 5' c Banet 16' m Con: Bourgeois (1/2) 7'; Pen: Bourgeois (2/2) 34', 45'

Wellington Regional Stadium, Wellington
Attendance: 3,000
Referee: Hollie Davidson (Scotland)

Team details

FB	15	Renee Holmes	(substituted off) 68'
RW	14	Ruby Tui
OC	13	Amy du Plessis	40' to 45'		(substituted on) 60'
IC	12	Sylvia Brunt	(substituted off) 60'
LW	11	Katelyn Vaha'akolo	(substituted off) 45'
FH	10	Ruahei Demant (c)
SH	9	Arihiana Marino-Tauhinu	(substituted off) 56'
N8	8	Liana Mikaele-Tu'u		(substituted off) 68'
OF	7	Kennedy Simon	(substituted off) 45'
BF	6	Alana Bremner	(substituted off) 60'
RL	5	Charmaine Smith	(substituted off) 45'
LL	4	Maia Roos
TP	3	Amy Rule	(substituted off) 60'
HK	2	Georgia Ponsonby	(substituted off) 60'
LP	1	Krystal Murray	(substituted off) 45'	(substituted on) 68'
Replacements:
HK	16	Luka Connor	(substituted on) 60'
PR	17	Chryss Viliko	(substituted on) 45'	(red card) 62'
PR	18	Tanya Kalounivale	(substituted on) 60'
LK	19	Chelsea Bremner	(substituted on) 45'
FL	20	Lucy Jenkins	(substituted on) 60'
SH	21	Ariana Bayler	(substituted on) 56'
CE	22	Patricia Maliepo	(substituted on) 40'	(substituted off) 45'	(substituted on) 60'
WG	23	Martha Mataele	(substituted on) 45'
Coach:
(New Zealand) Allan Bunting

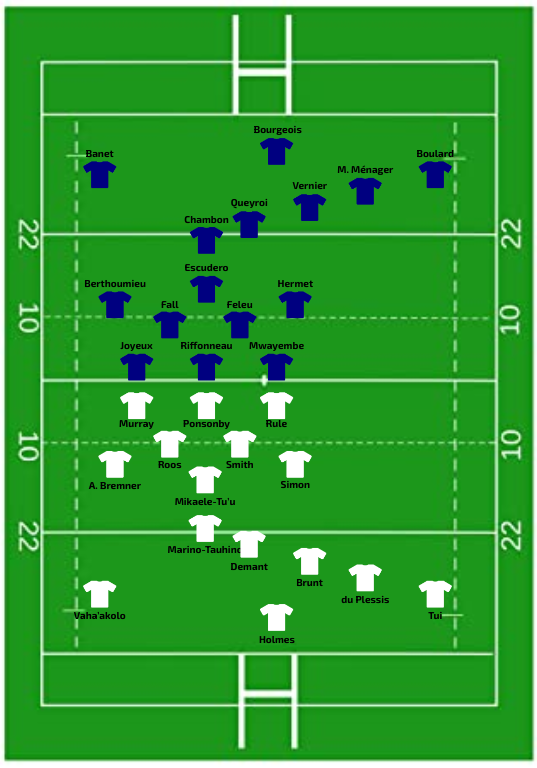

FB	15	Morgane Bourgeois
RW	14	Cyrielle Banet	(substituted off) 63'
OC	13	Marine Ménager		(substituted off) 77'
IC	12	Gabrielle Vernier	(substituted off) 53'	(substituted on) 77'
LW	11	Émilie Boulard
FH	10	Lina Queyroi
SH	9	Alexandre Chambon	(substituted off) 60'
N8	8	Charlotte Escudero	(substituted off) 63'
OF	7	Gaëlle Hermet
BF	6	Axelle Berthoumieu
RL	5	Madoussou Fall	(substituted off) 56'
LL	4	Manae Feleu (c)	(substituted off) 66'
TP	3	Clara Joyeux	(substituted off) 63'
HK	2	Élisa Riffonneau	(substituted off) 66'
LP	1	Ambre Mwayembe	(substituted off) 42'
Replacements:
HK	16	Laure Touyé	(substituted on) 66'
PR	17	Coco Lindelauf	(substituted on) 42'
PR	18	Assia Khalfaoui	(substituted on) 63'
LK	19	Audrey Forlani	(substituted on) 66'
FL	20	Lea Champon	(substituted on) 63'
N8	21	Emeline Gros	(substituted on) 63'
SH	22	Pauline Bourdon Sansus	(substituted on) 60'
CE	23	Nassira Konde	(substituted on) 53'
Coach:
(France) Gaëlle Mignot (France) David Ortiz

Player of the Match:
Émilie Boulard (France)

Assistant referees:
Aimee Barrett-Theron (South Africa)
Amber McLachlan (Australia)
Television match official:
Ian Tempest (England)

Notes:

- This was France's first victory over New Zealand in New Zealand.
- This was only New Zealand's third defeat at home, after respective 27–22 and 29–21 losses to England in 2001 and 2017.

=== Round 2 ===
27 October 2023
19:00 NZDT (UTC+13)

(1 BP) England	45–12	Canada
Try: Kildunne 8' c Atkin-Davies (4) 37' c, 40' +1 c, 51' c, 57' m Breach 69' m MacDonald 71' c Con: Aitchison (1/1) 9'; Rowland (4/6) 38', 43', 52', 72'	Report	Try: Tuttosi 31' m Farries 44' c Con: de Goede (1/2) 45'

Forsyth Barr Stadium, Dunedin
Referee: Maggie Cogger-Orr (New Zealand)

Team details

FB	15	Ellie Kildunne
RW	14	Abigail Dow		(substituted off) 63'
OC	13	Helena Rowland
IC	12	Amber Reed		(substituted off) 51'
LW	11	Claudia MacDonald
FH	10	Holly Aitchison	(yellow card) 30' to 40'
SH	9	Natasha Hunt		(substituted off) 56'
N8	8	Alex Matthews
OF	7	Marlie Packer (c)		(substituted off) 63'
BF	6	Morwenna Talling
RL	5	Catherine O'Donnell		(substituted off) 56'
LL	4	Zoe Aldcroft
TP	3	Sarah Bern		(substituted off) 63'
HK	2	Lark Atkin-Davies		(substituted off) 58'
LP	1	Mackenzie Carson		(substituted off) 50'
Replacements:
HK	16	Connie Powell		(substituted on) 58'
PR	17	Hannah Botterman		(substituted on) 50'
PR	18	Maud Muir		(substituted on) 63'
LK	19	Rosie Galligan		(substituted on) 56'
FL	20	Maisy Allen		(substituted on) 63'
SH	21	Ella Wyrwas		(substituted on) 56'
CE	22	Tatyana Heard		(substituted on) 51'
WG	23	Jess Breach		(substituted on) 63'
Coach:
(England) Louis Deacon

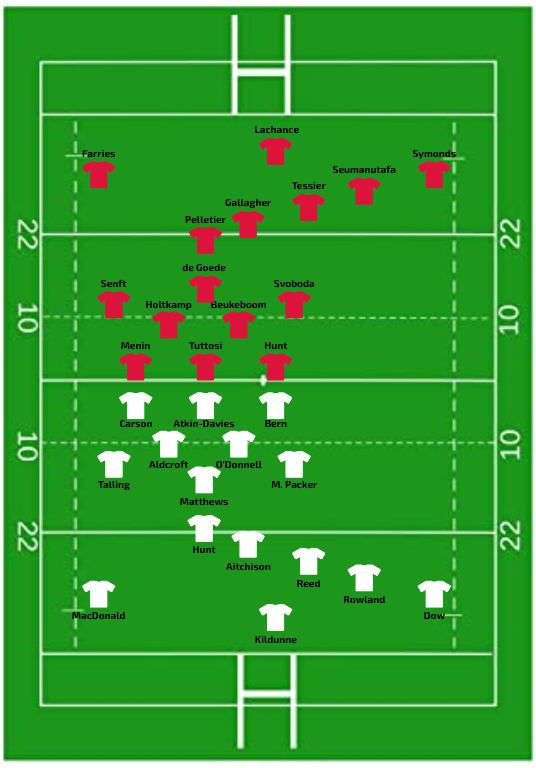

FB	15	Sarah-Maude Lachance
RW	14	Paige Farries
OC	13	Shoshanah Seumanutafa
IC	12	Alex Tessier
LW	11	Florence Symonds	(substituted off) 66'
FH	10	Claire Gallagher	(substituted off) 51'
SH	9	Olivia Apps	(substituted off) 51'
N8	8	Sophie de Goede (c)
OF	7	Sara Svoboda	(substituted off) 72'
BF	6	Gabby Senft
RL	5	Courtney Holtkamp
LL	4	Tyson Beukeboom	(substituted off) 62'	(substituted on) 68'	(substituted off) 72'
TP	3	DaLeaka Menin	(substituted off) 63'
HK	2	Emily Tuttosi	(substituted off) 62'
LP	1	McKinley Hunt	(substituted off) 63'
Replacements:
HK	16	Gillian Boag	(substituted on) 62'
PR	17	Brittany Kassil	(substituted on) 63'
PR	18	Alex Ellis	(substituted on) 63'
LK	19	Ashlynn Smith	(substituted on) 62'	68' to 72'
FL	20	Sara Cline	(substituted on) 72'
SH	21	Justine Pelletier	(substituted on) 51'
FH	22	Julia Schell	(substituted on) 51'	(yellow card) 56' to 66'
WG	23	Maddy Grant	(substituted on) 66'
Coach:
(France) Kévin Rouet

Player of the Match:
Lark Atkin-Davies (England)

Assistant referees:
Lauren Jenner (Italy/New Zealand)
Cassie Watt (New Zealand)
Television match official:
Andrew McMenemy (Scotland)

Notes:

- Lark Atkin-Davies (England) became the first female hooker to score four tries in a test.

28 October 2023
16:00 NZDT (UTC+13)

(1 BP) New Zealand	70–7	Wales
Try: Paul (3) 12' m, 53' c, 80' m Tui (4) 15' c, 20' m, 25' m, 28' m du Plessis 46' c Vaha'akolo 61' m Demant 70' c Jenkins (2) 73' m, 77' c Con: Holmes (5/12) 16', 47', 54', 71', 78'	Report	Try: Fleming 57' c Con: Wilkins (1/1) 58'

Forsyth Barr Stadium, Dunedin
Attendance: 4,500
Referee: Amber McLachlan (Australia)

Team details

FB	15	Renee Holmes
RW	14	Ruby Tui	(substituted off) 60'
OC	13	Amy du Plessis
IC	12	Sylvia Brunt	(substituted off) 67'
LW	11	Mererangi Paul
FH	10	Ruahei Demant (c)
SH	9	Arihiana Marino-Tauhinu	(substituted off) 49'
N8	8	Liana Mikaele-Tu'u	(substituted off) 63'
OF	7	Kennedy Simon
BF	6	Layla Sae	(substituted off) 63'
RL	5	Chelsea Bremner
LL	4	Maia Roos	(substituted off) 58'
TP	3	Amy Rule	(substituted off) 49'
HK	2	Georgia Ponsonby	(substituted off) 44'
LP	1	Kate Henwood
Replacements:
HK	16	Luka Connor	(substituted on) 49'
PR	17	Krystal Murray	(substituted on) 44'
PR	18	Tanya Kalounivale	(substituted on) 58'
FL	19	Alana Bremner	(substituted on) 63'
FL	20	Lucy Jenkins	(substituted on) 63'
SH	21	Iritana Hohaia	(substituted on) 49'
FH	22	Patricia Maliepo	(substituted on) 67'
WG	23	Katelyn Vaha'akolo	(substituted on) 60'
Coach:
(New Zealand) Allan Bunting

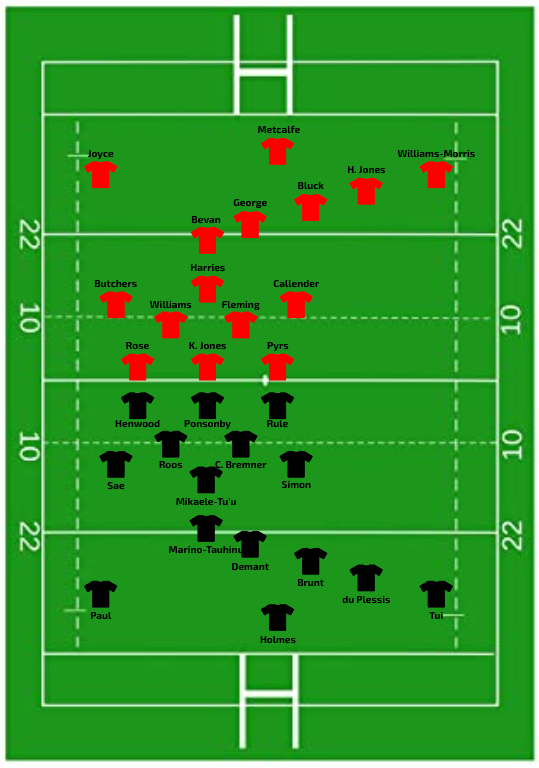

FB	15	Nel Metcalfe	(yellow card) 15' to 25'
RW	14	Jasmine Joyce
OC	13	Hannah Jones
IC	12	Hannah Bluck
LW	11	Carys Williams-Morris		(substituted off) 55'
FH	10	Lleucu George		(substituted off) 54'
SH	9	Keira Bevan		(substituted off) 48'
N8	8	Sioned Harries		(substituted off) 48'
OF	7	Alex Callender		(substituted off) 71'
BF	6	Alisha Butchers
RL	5	Kate Williams
LL	4	Abbie Fleming
TP	3	Donna Rose		(substituted off) 41'
HK	2	Kelsey Jones		(substituted off) 63'
LP	1	Gwenllian Pyrs		(substituted off) 63'
Replacements:
HK	16	Katharine Evans		(substituted on) 63'
PR	17	Abbey Constable		(substituted on) 63'
PR	18	Sisilia Tuipulotu		(substituted on) 41'
LK	19	Bryonie King		(substituted on) 48'
FL	20	Bethan Lewis		(substituted on) 71'
SH	21	Megan Davies		(substituted on) 48'
FH	22	Robyn Wilkins		(substituted on) 54'
WG	23	Megan Webb		(substituted on) 55'
Coach:
(Wales) Ioan Cunningham

Assistant referees:
Hollie Davidson (Scotland)
Sara Cox (England)
Television match official:
Rachel Horton (Australia)

Notes:

- This was New Zealand's largest win over Wales.

28 October 2023
19:00 NZDT (UTC+13)

France	20–29	Australia (1 BP)
Try: Boulard 14' c Riffonneau 74' m Vernier 81' m Con: Bourgeois (1/3) 15'; Pen: Bourgeois (1/1) 36'	Report	Try: Karpani (3) 3' c, 51' c, 70' c Friedrichs 24' m Con: Dallinger (2/3) 4', 53'; McKenzie (1/1) 71'; Pen: McKenzie (1/1) 62'

Forsyth Barr Stadium, Dunedin
Referee: Aimee Barrett-Theron (South Africa)

Team details

FB	15	Morgane Bourgeois
RW	14	Suliana Sivi
OC	13	Nassira Konde
IC	12	Marine Ménager	(substituted off) 53'
LW	11	Émilie Boulard
FH	10	Lina Queyroi	(substituted off) 66'
SH	9	Alexandre Chambon	(substituted off) 53'
N8	8	Charlotte Escudero
OF	7	Gaëlle Hermet
BF	6	Lea Champon	(substituted off) 61'
RL	5	Madoussou Fall	(substituted off) 76'
LL	4	Manae Feleu (c)
TP	3	Clara Joyeux	(substituted off) 59'
HK	2	Élisa Riffonneau
LP	1	Yllane Brosseau	(substituted off) 48'
Replacements:
HK	16	Melanie Blanchard
PR	17	Coco Lindelauf	(substituted on) 48'
PR	18	Assia Khalfaoui	(substituted on) 59'
LK	19	Kiara Zago	(substituted on) 76'
N8	20	Emeline Gros	(substituted on) 61'
SH	21	Pauline Bourdon Sansus	(substituted on) 53'
FH	22	Carla Arbez	(substituted on) 66'
CE	23	Gabrielle Vernier	(substituted on) 53'
Coach:
(France) Gaëlle Mignot (France) David Ortiz

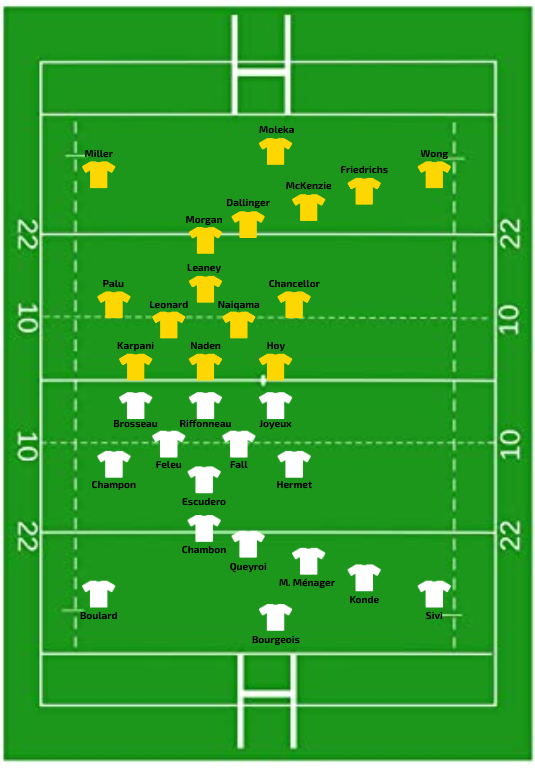

FB	15	Faitala Moleka	(substituted off) 68'
RW	14	Desiree Miller
OC	13	Georgina Friedrichs
IC	12	Arabella McKenzie
LW	11	Ivania Wong
FH	10	Carys Dallinger	(substituted off) 59'
SH	9	Layne Morgan	(substituted off) 71'
N8	8	Kaitlan Leaney
OF	7	Emily Chancellor
BF	6	Siokapesi Palu	(substituted off) 59'
RL	5	Michaela Leonard (c)
LL	4	Sera Naiqama	(substituted off) 63'
TP	3	Asoiva Karpani	(substituted off) 71'
HK	2	Tania Naden	(substituted off) 55'
LP	1	Brianna Hoy	(substituted off) 55'
Replacements:
HK	16	Adiana Talakai	(substituted on) 55'
PR	17	Bree-Anna Cheatham	(substituted on) 55'
PR	18	Emily Robinson	(substituted on) 71'
LK	19	Atasi Lafai	(substituted on) 63'
FL	20	Leilani Nathan	(substituted on) 59'
SH	21	Sarah Dougherty	(substituted on) 71'
CE	22	Cecilia Smith	(substituted on) 59'
WG	23	Melanie Wilks
Coach:
(Australia) Jay Tregonning

Player of the Match:
Asoiva Karpani (Australia)

Assistant referees:
Lauren Jenner (Italy/New Zealand)
Cassie Watt (New Zealand)
Television match official:
Ian Tempest (England)

Notes:

- This was Australia's first victory over France since the 2010 World Cup.

=== Round 3 ===
3 November 2023
19:00 NZDT (UTC+13)

(1 BP) Australia	25–19	Wales (1 BP)
Try: Stewart 16' m Karpani 52' m Cramer 67' c Wong 73' m Con: Dallinger (1/4) 68'; Pen: Dallinger (1/1) 34'	Report	Try: Phillips 28' c Penalty try 48'; K. Jones 77' m Con: Bevan (1/2) 30'

Mount Smart Stadium, Auckland
Referee: Hollie Davidson (Scotland)

Team details

FB	15	Faitala Moleka		(substituted off) 49'
RW	14	Maya Stewart
OC	13	Georgina Friedrichs
IC	12	Arabella McKenzie		(substituted off) 60'
LW	11	Ivania Wong
FH	10	Carys Dallinger
SH	9	Layne Morgan		(substituted off) 73'
N8	8	Kaitlin Leaney
OF	7	Emily Chancellor
BF	6	Siokapesi Palu	(red card) 49'
RL	5	Michaela Leonard (c)		(substituted off) 61'
LL	4	Sera Naiqama	(yellow card) 48' to 58'	(substituted off) 59'
TP	3	Asoiva Karpani		(substituted off) 61'
HK	2	Tania Naden		(substituted off) 61'
LP	1	Brianna Hoy		(substituted off) 61'
Replacements:
HK	16	Adiana Talakai		(substituted on) 61'
PR	17	Bree-Anne Cheatham		(substituted on) 61'
PR	18	Bridie O'Gorman		(substituted on) 61'
LK	19	Atasi Lafai		(substituted on) 59'
FL	20	Ashley Marsters		(substituted on) 61'
SH	21	Jasmin Huriwai		(substituted on) 73'
CE	22	Cecilia Smith		(substituted on) 66'
FB	23	Lori Cramer		(substituted on) 49'
Coach:
(Australia) Jay Tregonning

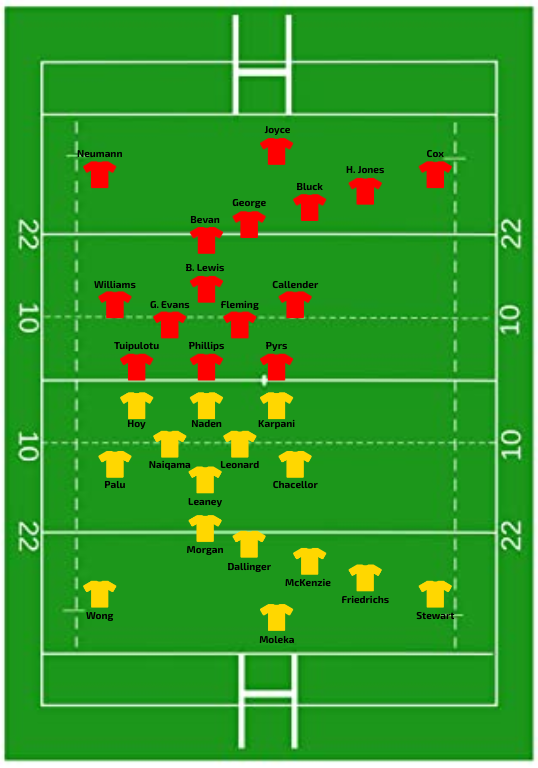

FB	15	Jasmine Joyce	Substituted off
RW	14	Lisa Neumann	(substituted off) 70'
OC	13	Hannah Jones
IC	12	Hannah Bluck	(substituted off) 55'
LW	11	Carys Cox
FH	10	Lleucu George
SH	9	Keira Bevan	(substituted off) 49'
N8	8	Bethan Lewis
OF	7	Alex Callender
BF	6	Kate Williams
RL	5	Georgia Evans	(substituted off) 70'
LL	4	Abbie Fleming	(substituted off) 53'
TP	3	Sisilia Tuipulotu	(substituted off) 73'
HK	2	Carys Phillips	(substituted off) 64'
LP	1	Gwenllian Pyrs	(substituted off) 73'
Replacements:
HK	16	Kelsey Jones	(substituted on) 64'
PR	17	Abbey Constable	(substituted on) 73'
PR	18	Cerys Hale	(substituted on) 73'
FL	19	Alisha Butchers	(substituted on) 53'
N8	20	Sioned Harries	(substituted on) 70'
SH	21	Megan Davies	(substituted on) 49'
FH	22	Robyn Wilkins	Substituted on
CE	23	Kerin Lake	(substituted on) 55'
Coach:
(Wales) Ioan Cunningham

Player of the Match:
Kaitlin Leaney (Australia)

Assistant referees:
Sara Cox (England)
Tiana Anderson (New Zealand)
Television match official:
Ian Tempest (England)

4 November 2023
16:00 NZDT (UTC+13)

France	20–29	Canada (1 BP)
Try: Bourdon Sansus 14' c M. Ménager 57' c Con: Bourgeois (2/2) 15', 58'; Pen: Bourgeois (2/2) 2', 73'	Report	Try: Tuttosi 35' c Scurfield 44' c Holtkamp 50' m Bermudez 66' c Con: de Goede (3/4) 36', 35', 68'; Pen: de Goede (1/1) 76'

Mount Smart Stadium, Auckland
Referee: Maggie Cogger-Orr (New Zealand)

Team details

FB	15	Morgane Bourgeois
RW	14	Marine Ménager
OC	13	Nassira Konde	(yellow card) 38' to 48'
IC	12	Gabrielle Vernier		(substituted off) 45'
LW	11	Émilie Boulard
FH	10	Lina Queyroi		(substituted off) 61'
SH	9	Pauline Bourdon Sansus		(substituted off) 78'
N8	8	Charlotte Escudero
OF	7	Gaëlle Hermet
BF	6	Emeline Gros		(substituted off) 74'
RL	5	Audrey Forlani		(substituted off) 55'
LL	4	Manae Feleu (c)
TP	3	Assia Khalfaoui		(substituted off) 55'
HK	2	Laure Touyé		(substituted off) 68'
LP	1	Ambre Mwayembe		(substituted off) 49'
Replacements:
HK	16	Élisa Riffonneau		(substituted on) 68'
PR	17	Coco Lindelauf		(substituted on) 55'
PR	18	Yllana Brosseau		(substituted on) 49'
LK	19	Kiara Zago		(substituted on) 55'
FL	20	Lea Champon		(substituted on) 74'
SH	21	Alexandre Chambon		(substituted on) 78'
FH	22	Carla Arbez		(substituted on) 61'
WG	23	Caroline Boujard		(substituted on) 45'
Coach:
(France) Gaëlle Mignot (France) David Ortiz

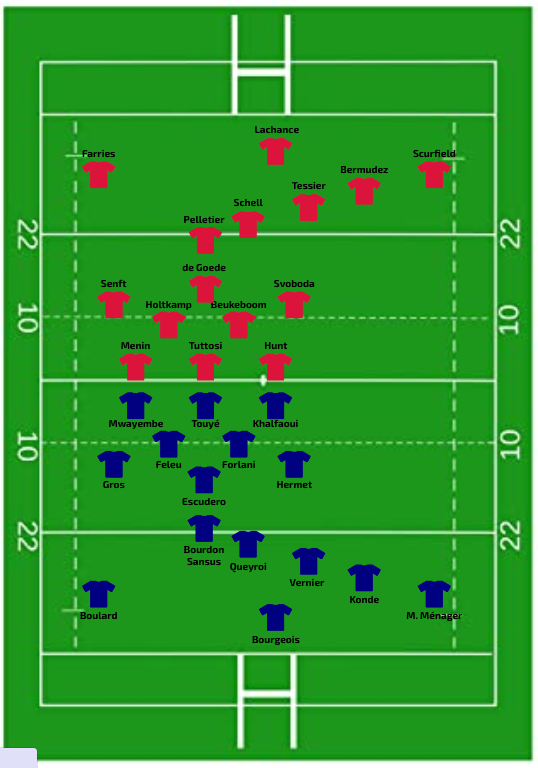

FB	15	Sarah-Maude Lachance
RW	14	Paige Farries
OC	13	Fancy Bermudez
IC	12	Alex Tessier
LW	11	Krissy Scurfield	(substituted off) 52'
FH	10	Julia Schell
SH	9	Justine Pelletier	(substituted off) 58'
N8	8	Sophie de Goede
OF	7	Sara Svoboda
BF	6	Gabby Senft
RL	5	Courtney Holtkamp	(substituted off) 63'
LL	4	Tyson Beukeboom	(substituted off) 78'
TP	3	DaLeaka Menin	(substituted off) 68'
HK	2	Emily Tuttosi	(substituted off) 61'
LP	1	McKinley Hunt	(substituted off) 59'
Replacements:
HK	16	Gillian Boag	(substituted on) 61'
PR	17	Brittany Kassil	(substituted on) 59'
PR	18	Alex Ellis	(substituted on) 68'
LK	19	Laetitia Royer	(substituted on) 63'
FL	20	Julia Omokhuale	(substituted on) 78'
SH	21	Olivia Apps	(substituted on) 58'
FH	22	Shoshanah Seumanutafa
WG	23	Florence Symonds	(substituted on) 52'
Coach:
(France) Kévin Rouet

Player of the Match:
Fancy Bermudez (Canada)

Assistant referees:
Lauren Jenner (Italy/New Zealand)
Tiana Anderson (New Zealand)
Television match official:
Rachel Horton (Australia)

4 November 2023
19:00 NZDT (UTC+13)

(1 BP) England	33–12	New Zealand
Try: Matthews 4' c Atkin-Davies 12' c Bern 23' m Talling 55' c Aldcroft 69' c Con: Aitchison (4/5) 5', 13', 56', 70'	Report	Try: Simon 39' c Vaha'akolo 49' m Con: Holmes (1/1) 40'

Mount Smart Stadium, Auckland
Attendance: 10,000
Referee: Aimee Barrett-Theron (South Africa)

Team details

FB	15	Ellie Kildunne
RW	14	Abigail Dow
OC	13	Helena Rowland			(substituted off) 68'
IC	12	Tatyana Heard	52' to 62'
LW	11	Claudia MacDonald	(substituted off) 72'
FH	10	Holly Aitchison
SH	9	Natasha Hunt	(substituted off) 62'
N8	8	Alex Matthews
OF	7	Marlie Packer (c)
BF	6	Morwenna Talling	18' to 29'		(substituted off) 72'
RL	5	Rosie Galligan	(substituted off) 73'
LL	4	Zoe Aldcroft
TP	3	Sarah Bern	(substituted off) 72'
HK	2	Lark Atkin-Davies	(substituted off) 73'
LP	1	Mackenzie Carson	(substituted off) 47'
Replacements:
HK	16	Connie Powell	(substituted on) 73'
PR	17	Hannah Botterman	(substituted on) 47'
PR	18	Maud Muir	(substituted on) 72'
FL	19	Sarah Beckett	(substituted on) 73'
FL	20	Maisy Allen	(substituted on) 18'	(substituted off) 29'	(substituted on) 72'
SH	21	Ella Wyrwas	(substituted on) 62'
FH	22	Megan Jones	(substituted on) 52'	(substituted off) 62'	(substituted on) 68'
WG	23	Jess Breach	(substituted on) 72'
Coach:
(England) Louis Deacon

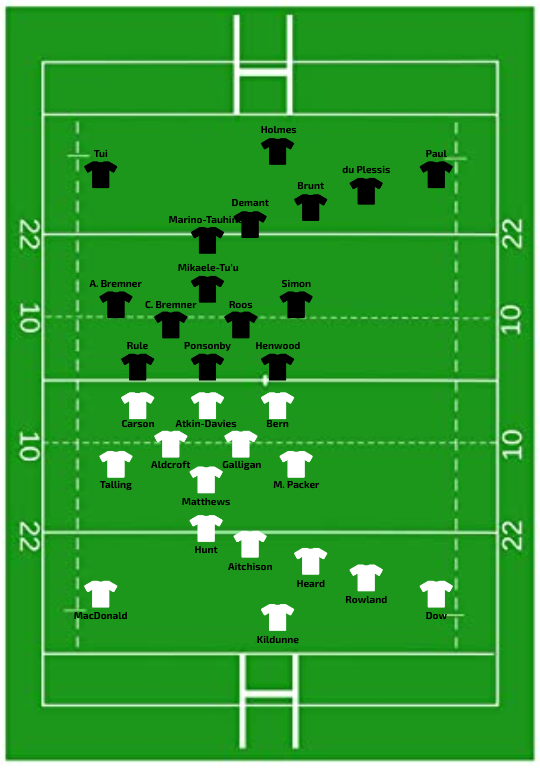

FB	15	Renee Holmes	54' to 64'
RW	14	Ruby Tui
OC	13	Amy du Plessis			(substituted off) 72'
IC	12	Sylvia Brunt
LW	11	Mererangi Paul	(substituted off) 40'
FH	10	Ruahei Demant (cc)
SH	9	Arihiana Marino-Tauhinu	(substituted off) 56'
N8	8	Liana Mikaele-Tu'u
OF	7	Kennedy Simon (cc)	(substituted off) 66'
BF	6	Alana Bremner	(substituted off) 46'
RL	5	Chelsea Bremner
LL	4	Maia Roos
TP	3	Amy Rule	(substituted off) 72'
HK	2	Georgia Ponsonby	(substituted off) 46'
LP	1	Kate Henwood	(substituted off) 46'
Replacements:
HK	16	Luka Connor	(substituted on) 46'
PR	17	Krystal Murray	(substituted on) 46'
PR	18	Sophie Fisher	(substituted on) 72'
LK	19	Layla Sae	(substituted on) 46'
FL	20	Lucy Jenkins	(substituted on) 66'
SH	21	Iritana Hohaia	(substituted on) 56'
CE	22	Patricia Maliepo	(substituted on) 54'	(substituted off) 64'	(substituted on) 72'
WG	23	Katelyn Vaha'akolo	(substituted on) 40'
Coach:
(New Zealand) Allan Bunting

Player of the Match:
Sarah Bern (England)

Assistant referees:
Hollie Davidson (Scotland)
Amber McLachlan (Australia)
Television match official:
Andrew McMenemy (Scotland)

Notes:

- Amy Cokayne was originally named as the England replacement hooker but withdrew before kick-off. She was replaced by Connie Powell.
- Referee Aimee Barrett-Theron officiated a record 47th test match.
- In order to win the title, England were required to avoid defeat, while New Zealand were required to win without England scoring any bonus points. As England won, they claimed their inaugural WXV 1 title.
- This was New Zealand's largest loss at home, surpassing the 8-point deficit they lost by to England in 2017.

== WXV 2 ==
2023 WXV 2

Tournament details
- Host: South Africa
- Dates: 13 — 28 October 2023
- Teams: Italy; Japan; Samoa; Scotland; South Africa; United States

Final positions
- Champions: Scotland (1st title)
- Runner-up: Italy

Tournament statistics
- Matches played: 9
- Tries scored: 61 (6.78 per match)
- Top scorer(s): (South Africa) Libbie Janse van Rensburg (38)
- Most tries: (Italy) Aura Muzzo (3) (Scotland) Lana Skeldon (3) (South Africa) Libbie Janse van Rensburg (3)

The 2023 WXV 2 was staged in South Africa between 13 and 28 October. The first round took place at Danie Craven Stadium in Stellenbosch, while the second and final rounds were hosted by Athlone Stadium in Cape Town. Each round featured a Friday double-header, followed by a Saturday match. Samoa, Scotland and Italy played matches against Japan, South Africa and the United States.

The relegation of Samoa, and Ireland's victory in WXV 3, means that Europe gain a place in WXV 2 for 2024 at the expense of Oceania. The fourth and fifth team in the 2024 Women's Six Nations Championship will both automatically qualify for WXV 2 in 2024, with the sixth placed team facing the winner of the Rugby Europe Women's Championship for a place in WXV 2. The winner and runner up in the Oceania Cup will both enter WXV 3 in 2024.

2023 WXV 2 table
Pos	Team	Pld	W	D	L	PF	PA	PD	TF	TA	TB	LB	Pts
1	Scotland (C)	3	3	0	0	93	38	+55	15	5	3	0	15
2	Italy	3	3	0	0	94	41	+53	14	6	3	0	15
3	South Africa (H)	3	1	0	2	68	74	−6	9	11	1	0	5
4	Japan	3	1	0	2	54	76	−22	8	11	1	0	5
5	United States	3	1	0	2	58	80	−22	9	13	1	0	5
6	Samoa (R)	3	0	0	3	43	101	−58	6	15	1	0	1

(C) Champions; (H) Host; (R) Regional position is relegated

=== Round 1 ===
13 October 2023
14:00 SAST (UTC+2)

(1 BP) Italy	28–15	Japan
Try: Rigoni 4' c Muzzo (2) 30' c, 46' c Granzotto 52' c Con: Sillari (4/4) 5', 31', 47', 53'	Report	Try: Matsumura (2) 20' m, 80' +2 m Nduka 55' m

Danie Craven Stadium, Stellenbosch
Referee: Kat Roche (United States)

Team details

FB	15	Francesca Granzotto
RW	14	Aura Muzzo
OC	13	Michela Sillari	(yellow card) 14' to 25'	(substituted off) 75'
IC	12	Beatrice Rigoni		(substituted off) 76'
LW	11	Alyssa D'Incà
FH	10	Veronica Madia
SH	9	Sofia Stefan (c)		(substituted off) 66'
N8	8	Giulia Cavina		(substituted off) 57'
OF	7	Alissa Ranuccini
BF	6	Alessandra Frangipani
RL	5	Giordana Duca
LL	4	Valeria Fedrighi		(substituted off) 73'
TP	3	Sara Seye		(substituted off) 41'
HK	2	Vittoria Vecchini		(substituted off) 57'
LP	1	Silvia Turani		(substituted off) 75'
Replacements:
HK	16	Laura Gurioli		(substituted on) 75'
PR	17	Gaia Maris		(substituted on) 57'
PR	18	Lucia Gai		(substituted on) 41'
LK	19	Alessia Pilani		(substituted on) 73'
FL	20	Sara Tounesi		(substituted on) 57'
SH	21	Emma Stevanin		(substituted on) 62'
FH	22	Beatrice Capomaggi		(substituted on) 75'
FB	23	Gaia Buso		(substituted on) 66'
Coach:
(Italy) Giovanni Raineri

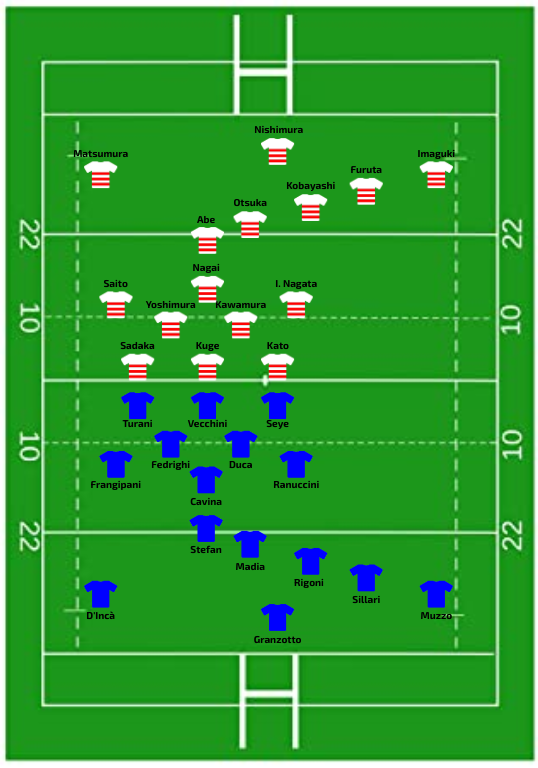

FB	15	Sora Nishimura
RW	14	Misaki Matsumura
OC	13	Mana Furuta	(substituted off) 67'
IC	12	Kanako Kobayashi
LW	11	Komachi Imakugi
FH	10	Ayasa Otsuka
SH	9	Megumi Abe	(substituted off) 64'
N8	8	Ayano Nagai	(substituted off) 52'
OF	7	Iroha Nagata (c)
BF	6	Seina Saito	(substituted off) 45'
RL	5	Otoka Yoshimura
LL	4	Masami Kawamura	(substituted off) 52'
TP	3	Yuka Sadaka	(substituted off) 44'
HK	2	Asuka Kuge	(substituted off) 52'
LP	1	Sachiko Kato	(substituted off) 62'
Replacements:
HK	16	Kotomi Taniguchi	(substituted on) 52'
PR	17	Hinata Komaki	(substituted on) 44'
PR	18	Nijiho Nagata	(substituted on) 62'
LK	19	Jennifer Nduka	(substituted on) 52'
FL	20	Sakurako Korai	(substituted on) 45'
SH	21	Kotono Yasuo	(substituted on) 64'
FL	22	Mei Yoshimoto	(substituted on) 52'
CE	23	Minori Yamamoto	(substituted on) 67'
Coach:
(Canada) Lesley McKenzie

Player of the Match:
Aura Muzzo (Italy)

Assistant referees:
Aurélie Groizeleau (France)
Zoe Naude (South Africa)
Television match official:
Quinton Immelman (South Africa)

13 October 2023
16:30 SAST (UTC+2)

(1 BP) Scotland	31–17	South Africa
Try: Gallagher 24' m Skeldon (2) 34' c, 43' m Bartlett 56' c Thomson 76' c Con: Nelson (1/2) 35'; Smith (2/2) 57', 77'	Report	Try: Hele 28' c Botes 64' c Con: Janse van Rensburg (2/2) 29', 65'; Pen: Janse van Rensburg (1/1) 9'

Danie Craven Stadium, Stellenbosch
Referee: Natarsha Ganley (New Zealand)

Team details

FB	15	Chloe Rollie
RW	14	Rhona Lloyd
OC	13	Emma Orr
IC	12	Lisa Thomson
LW	11	Francesca McGhie	(substituted off) 67'
FH	10	Helen Nelson	(substituted off) 51'
SH	9	Mairi McDonald	(substituted off) 51'
N8	8	Evie Gallagher
OF	7	Rachel McLachlan	(substituted off) 75'
BF	6	Rachel Malcolm (c)
RL	5	Louise McMillan	(substituted off) 78'
LL	4	Emma Wassell
TP	3	Christine Belisle	(substituted off) 59'
HK	2	Lana Skeldon	12' to 24'		(substituted off) 77'
LP	1	Leah Bartlett	(substituted off) 65'
Replacements:
HK	16	Elis Martin	(substituted on) 12'	(substituted off) 24'	(substituted on) 77'
PR	17	Anne Young	(substituted on) 65'
PR	18	Lisa Cockburn	(substituted on) 59'
LK	19	Eva Donaldson	(substituted on) 78'
N8	20	Jade Konkel-Roberts	(substituted on) 75'
SH	21	Caity Mattinson	(substituted on) 51'
CE	22	Meryl Smith	(substituted on) 51'
WG	23	Liz Musgrove	(substituted on) 67'
Coach:
(Scotland) Bryan Easson

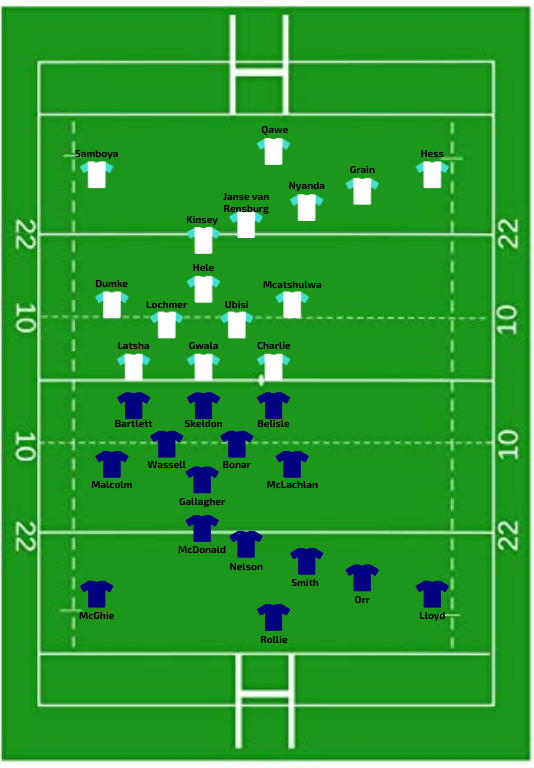

FB	15	Chuma Qawe
RW	14	Maceala Samboya	(substituted off) 46'
OC	13	Veroeshka Grain
IC	12	Piwokuhle Nyanda
LW	11	Shaunique Hess
FH	10	Libbie Janse van Rensburg
SH	9	Tayla Kinsey	(substituted off) 57'
N8	8	Aseza Hele	(substituted off) 51'
OF	7	Sinazo Mcatshulwa	(substituted off) 59'
BF	6	Lusanda Dumke
RL	5	Danelle Lochner
LL	4	Vainah Ubisi	(substituted off) 59'
TP	3	Babalwa Latsha (c)	(substituted off) 59'
HK	2	Lindelwa Gwala	(substituted off) 59'
LP	1	Sanelisiwe Charlie	(substituted off) 59'
Replacements:
HK	16	Roseline Botes	(substituted on) 59'
PR	17	Yonela Ngxingolo	(substituted on) 59'
PR	18	Amber Schonert	(substituted on) 59'
LK	19	Nolusindiso Booi	(substituted on) 59'
FL	20	Catha Jacobs	(substituted on) 59'
SH	21	Micke Gunter	(substituted on) 51'
CE	22	Rumandi Potgieter	(substituted on) 57'
WG	23	Mary Zulu	(substituted on) 46'
Coach:
(South Africa) Louis Koen

Player of the Match:
Lana Skeldon (Scotland)

Assistant referees:
Clara Munarini (Italy)
Holly Wood (England)
Television match official:
Leo Colgan (Ireland)

Notes:

- Sarah Bonar was originally named for Scotland at lock but withdrew before kick-off. She was replaced by Louise McMillan whose place on the bench was taken Eva Donaldson.

14 October 2023
14:00 SAST (UTC+2)

(1 BP) United States	36–26	Samoa (1 BP)
Try: Clapp 14' m Hingano 20' c Taufo'ou 40+2' m Feury 41' c Zackary 50' c Johnson 57' m Con: Cantorna (3/6) 21', 42', 52'	Report	Try: Fiafia 7' c Wright-Akeli (2) 32' c, 73' m Filimaua 66' c Con: Siataga (2/2) 8', 33'; Milo (1/2) 67'

Danie Craven Stadium, Stellenbosch
Referee: Precious Pazani (Zimbabwe)

Team details

FB	15	Bulou Mataitoga
RW	14	Tess Feury
OC	13	Kate Zackary (c)
IC	12	Atumata Hingano	(substituted off) 60'
LW	11	Lotte Clapp
FH	10	Gabby Cantorna
SH	9	Carly Waters	(substituted off) 53'
N8	8	Rachel Johnson
OF	7	Tahlia Brody
BF	6	Freda Tafuna	(substituted off) 62'
RL	5	Erica Jarrell	(substituted off) 72'
LL	4	Hallie Taufo'ou
TP	3	Charli Jacoby	(substituted off) 44'
HK	2	Kathryn Treder	(substituted off) 53'
LP	1	Catherine Benson	(substituted off) 53'
Replacements:
HK	16	Paige Stathopoulos	(substituted on) 53'
PR	17	Mona Lisa Tupou	(substituted on) 53'
PR	18	Keia Mae Sagapolu	(substituted on) 44'
LK	19	Jenny Kronish	(substituted on) 72'
FL	20	Rachel Ehrecke	(substituted on) 62'
SH	21	Taina Tukuafu	(substituted on) 53'
CE	22	Meya Bizer	(substituted on) 60'	(substituted off) 68'
FB	23	Emily Henrich		(substituted on) 68'
Coach:
(New Zealand) Milton Haig

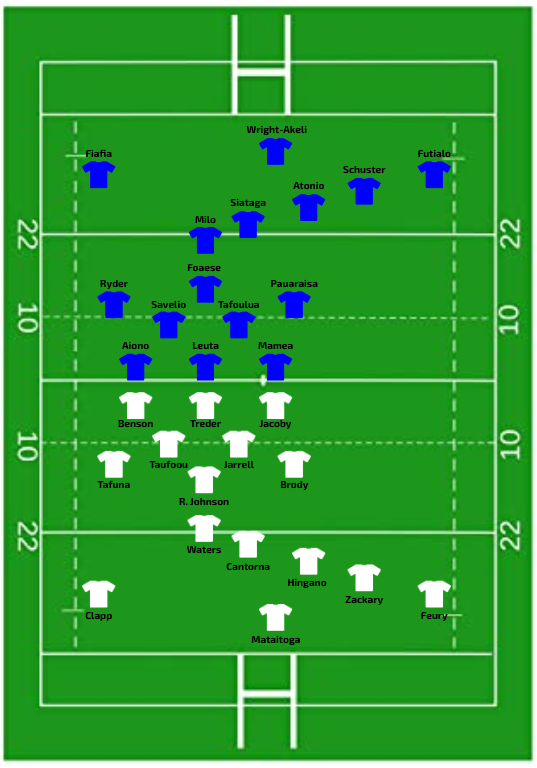

FB	15	Karla Wright-Akeli
RW	14	Linda Fiafia
OC	13	Hope Schuster		(substituted off) 52'
IC	12	Utumalama Atonio
LW	11	Allison Futialo		(substituted off) 52'
FH	10	Cassie Siataga		(substituted off) 60'
SH	9	Bella Milo
N8	8	Nina Foaese
OF	7	Sui Pauaraisa (c)
BF	6	Sinead Ryder
RL	5	Easter Savelio
LL	4	Olalini Tafoulua		(substituted off) 77'
TP	3	Rereglory Aiono		(substituted off) 47'
HK	2	Lulu Leuta	(yellow card) 16' to 27'	(substituted off) 42'
LP	1	Ana Mamea		(substituted off) 63'
Replacements:
HK	16	Sosoli Talawadua		(substituted on) 42'
PR	17	Avau Filimaua		(substituted on) 47'
PR	18	Maletina Brown		(substituted on) 63'
LK	19	Faalua Tugaga
FL	20	Ti Tauasosi		(substituted on) 77'
SH	21	Fogamanono Tusiga
CE	22	Hasting Leiataua		(substituted on) 52'
WG	23	Michelle Curry		(substituted on) 52'
Coach:
(Samoa) Ramsey Tomokino

Player of the Match:
Atumata Hingano (United States)

Assistant referees:
Holly Wood (England)
Zoe Naude (South Africa)
Television match official:
Quinton Immelman (South Africa)

Notes:

- This was the first meeting between the two nations.

=== Round 2 ===
20 October 2023
14:00 SAST (UTC+2)

United States	14–24	Scotland (1 BP)
Try: Jacoby 39' c Stathopoulos 66' c Con: Cantorna (1/1) 40'; Feury (1/1) 67'	Report	Try: McGhie 11' m Wassell 16' c Lloyd 20' m Rollie 61' c Con: Nelson (1/3) 17'; Smith (1/1) 62'

Athlone Stadium, Cape Town
Referee: Clara Munarini (Italy)

Team details

FB	15	Bulou Mataitoga	(substituted off) 60'
RW	14	Tess Feury
OC	13	Kate Zackary (c)
IC	12	Atumata Hingano
LW	11	Lotte Clapp
FH	10	Gabby Cantorna	(substituted off) 49'
SH	9	Carly Waters	(substituted off) 49'
N8	8	Rachel Johnson
OF	7	Tahlia Brody
BF	6	Freda Tafuna	(substituted off) 56'
RL	5	Erica Jarrell	(substituted off) 67'
LL	4	Hallie Taufo'ou
TP	3	Charli Jacoby	(substituted off) 40'
HK	2	Kathryn Treder	(substituted off) 26'
LP	1	Catherine Benson	(substituted off) 60'
Replacements:
HK	16	Paige Stathopoulos	(substituted on) 26'
PR	17	Mona Lisa Tupou	(substituted on) 60'
PR	18	Keia Mae Sagapolu	(substituted on) 40'
LK	19	Jenny Kronish	(substituted on) 67'
FL	20	Rachel Ehrecke	(substituted on) 56'
SH	21	Taina Tukuafu	(substituted on) 49'
CE	22	Katana Howard	(substituted on) 49'
FB	23	Autumn Czaplicki	(substituted on) 60'
Coach:
(New Zealand) Milton Haig

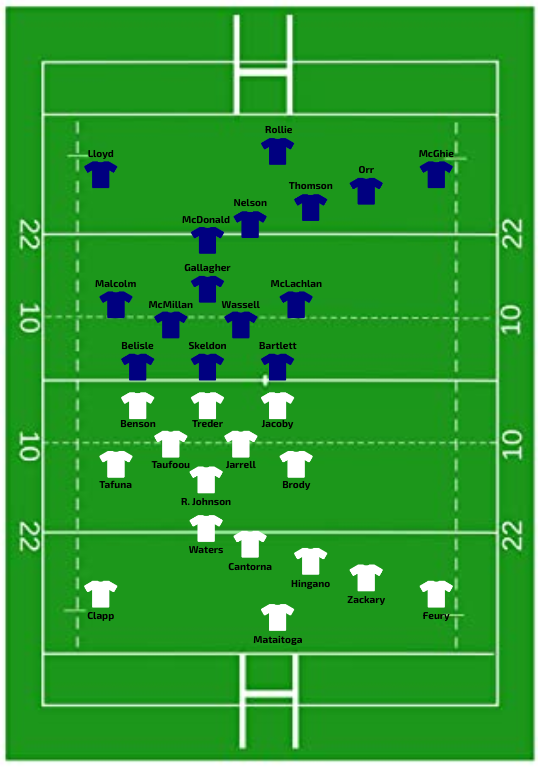

FB	15	Chloe Rollie
RW	14	Rhona Lloyd
OC	13	Emma Orr
IC	12	Lisa Thomson
LW	11	Francesca McGhie	(substituted off) 80+1'
FH	10	Helen Nelson	(substituted off) 73'
SH	9	Mairi McDonald	(substituted off) 49'
N8	8	Evie Gallagher
OF	7	Rachel McLachlan	(substituted off) 49'
BF	6	Rachel Malcolm (c)
RL	5	Louise McMillan	(substituted off) 40'
LL	4	Emma Wassell	(substituted off) 80+1'
TP	3	Christine Belisle	(substituted off) 67'
HK	2	Lana Skeldon	(substituted off) 80+1'
LP	1	Leah Bartlett	(substituted off) 69'
Replacements:
HK	16	Elis Martin	(substituted on) 80+1'
PR	17	Anne Young	(substituted on) 69'
PR	18	Lisa Cockburn	(substituted on) 67'
LK	19	Eva Donaldson	(substituted on) 80+1'
FL	20	Jade Konkel-Roberts	(substituted on) 49'
SH	21	Caity Mattinson	(substituted on) 49'
CE	22	Meryl Smith	(substituted on) 73'
WG	23	Liz Musgrove	(substituted on) 80+1'
Coach:
(Scotland) Bryan Easson

Player of the Match:
Evie Gallagher (Scotland)

Assistant referees:
Natarsha Ganley (New Zealand)
Zoe Naude (South African)
Television match official:
Quinton Immelman (South Africa)

Notes:

- This was Scotland's first win over the United States since their 22–3 victory over them in Inverleith in 2001.

20 October 2023
16:30 SAST (UTC+2)

(1 BP) Italy	36–18	South Africa
Try: Ostuni Minuzzi 4' c Muzzo 12' c Ranuccini 24' m Vecchini 51' c D'Incà 74' c Con: Capomaggi (4/5) 6', 13', 53', 75'; Pen: Capomaggi (1/1) 36'	Report	Try: Latsha 9' c Dolf 58' m Con: Janse van Rensburg (1/2) 10'; Pen: Janse van Rensburg (2/2) 28', 48'

Athlone Stadium, Cape Town
Referee: Aurélie Groizeleau (France)

Team details

FB	15	Vittoria Ostuni Minuzzi
RW	14	Aura Muzzo	(substituted off) 59'
OC	13	Beatrice Capomaggi
IC	12	Beatrice Rigoni (c)
LW	11	Alyssa D'Incà
FH	10	Veronica Madia
SH	9	Francesca Granzotto	(substituted off) 34'
N8	8	Giulia Cavina	(substituted off) 65'
OF	7	Alissa Ranuccini
BF	6	Isabella Locatelli	(substituted off) 65'
RL	5	Sara Tounesi	(substituted off) 14'
LL	4	Valeria Fedrighi
TP	3	Alessia Pilani	(substituted off) 50'
HK	2	Vittoria Vecchini	(substituted off) 65'
LP	26	Silvia Turani	(substituted off) 59'
Replacements:
HK	16	Laura Gurioli	(substituted on) 65'
PR	17	Gaia Maris	(substituted on) 59'
PR	18	Lucia Gai	(substituted on) 50'
LK	19	Alessandra Frangipani	(substituted on) 14'
FL	20	Elena Erricchiello	(substituted on) 65'
SH	21	Nicole Mastrangelo	(substituted on) 34'
CE	22	Emma Stevanin	(substituted on) 59'
WG	23	Sofia Catellani
Coach:
(Italy) Giovanni Raineri

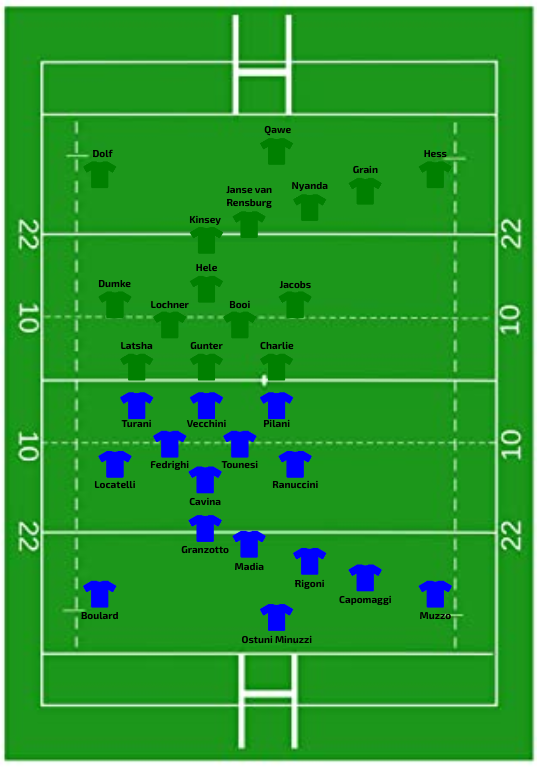

FB	15	Chuma Qawe		(substituted off) 42'
RW	14	Byrhandre Dolf
OC	13	Veroeshka Grain	(yellow card) 17' to 28'
IC	12	Piwokuhle Nyanada
LW	11	Shaunique Hess
FH	10	Libbie Janse van Rensburg
SH	9	Tayla Kinsey		(substituted off) 25'
N8	8	Aseza Hele	(red card) 50'
OF	7	Catha Jacobs
BF	6	Lusanda Dumke
RL	5	Danelle Lochnar		(substituted off) 40'
LL	4	Nolusindiso Booi		(substituted off) 53'
TP	3	Babalwa Latsha		(substituted off) 65'
HK	2	Micke Gunter		(substituted off) 28'
LP	1	Sanelisiwe Charlie		(substituted off) 53'
Replacements:
HK	16	Lucheli Hanekom		(substituted on) 28'	(substituted off) 59'
PR	17	Asithandile Ntoyanto		(substituted on) 53'
PR	18	Yonela Ngxingolo		(substituted on) 53'
LK	19	Vainah Ubisi		(substituted on) 40'
FL	20	Sinazo Mcatshulwa		(substituted on) 53'
LK	21	Nompumelelo Mathe
SH	22	Unam Tose		(substituted on) 25'
WG	23	Unathi Mali		(substituted on) 65'
Coach:
(South Africa) Louis Koen

Player of the Match:
Beatrice Rigoni (Italy)

Assistant referees:
Kat Roche (United States)
Precious Pazani (Zimbabwe)
Television match official:
Leo Colgan (Ireland)

Notes:

- No replacement was issued for Lucheli Hanekom when she came off in the 59th minute.
- Due to injuries to both South African hookers, scrums went uncontested in the 65th minute.

21 October 2023
16:00 SAST (UTC+2)

(1 BP) Japan	32–10	Samoa
Try: I. Nagata 27' c Korai 47' m Hirotsu 65' c Ando 71' c Con: Otsuka (3/4) 28', 66', 72'; Pen: Otsuka (2/3) 20', 37'	Report	Try: Aiono 25' c Con: Siataga (1/1) 26'; Pen: Siataga (1/1) 9'

Athlone Stadium, Cape Town
Referee: Holly Wood (England)

Team details

FB	15	Sora Nishimura
RW	14	Misaki Matsumura
OC	13	Kanako Kobayashi	(substituted off) 66'
IC	12	Haruka Hirotsu
LW	11	Komachi Imakugi
FH	10	Ayasa Otsuka	(substituted off) 72'
SH	9	Megumi Abe	(substituted off) 61'
N8	8	Seina Saito	(substituted off) 72'
OF	7	Iroha Nagata (c)
BF	6	Sakurako Korai
RL	5	Otoka Yoshimura	(substituted off) 64'
LL	4	Masami Kawamura
TP	3	Yuka Sadaka	(substituted off) 56'
HK	2	Kotomi Taniguchi	(substituted off) 66'
LP	1	Hinata Komaki	(substituted off) 61'
Replacements:
PR	16	Sachiko Kato	(substituted on) 61'
HK	17	Asuka Kuge	(substituted on) 66'
PR	18	Nijiho Nagata	(substituted on) 56'
LK	19	Jennifer Nduka	(substituted on) 64'
FL	20	Ayano Nagai	(substituted on) 72'
SH	21	Kotono Yasuo	(substituted on) 61'
FH	22	Sakurako Hatada	(substituted on) 66'
FB	23	Minori Yamamoto	(substituted on) 72'
Coach:
(Canada) Lesley McKenzie

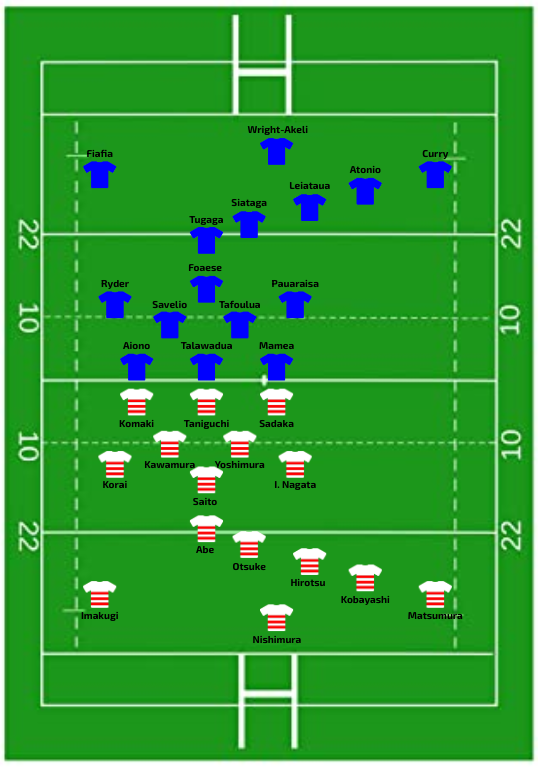

FB	15	Karla Wright-Akeli	(yellow card) 55' to 65'
RW	14	Linda Fiafia	(yellow card) 57' to 69'	(substituted off) 72'
OC	13	Utumalama Atonio
IC	12	Hasting Leiataua
LW	11	Michelle Curry
FH	10	Cassie Siataga		(substituted off) 64'
SH	9	Faalua Tugaga		(substituted off) 72'
N8	8	Nina Foaese
OF	7	Sui Pauraisa (c)		(substituted off) 29'
BF	6	Sinead Ryder		(substituted off) 76'
RL	5	Easter Savelio
LL	4	Olalini Tafoulua
TP	3	Rereglory Aiono		(substituted off) 64'
HK	2	Sosoli Talawadua		(substituted off) 62'
LP	1	Ana Mamea		(substituted off) 58'
Replacements:
HK	16	Lulu Leuta		(substituted on) 62'
PR	17	Avau Filimaua		(substituted on) 58'
PR	18	Angelica Uila		(substituted on) 64'
LK	19	Fogamanono Tusiga		(substituted on) 76'
FL	20	Taalili Iosefo		(substituted on) 29'
SH	21	Bella Milo		(substituted on) 64'
FH	22	Lutia Col Aumua		(substituted on) 72'
FB	23	Saelua Leaula		(substituted on) 72'
Coach:
(Samoa) Ramsey Tomokino

Player of the Match:
Megumi Abe (Japan)

Assistant referees:
Natarsha Ganley (New Zealand)
Zoe Naude (South Africa)
Television match official:
Leo Colgan (Ireland)

=== Round 3 ===
27 October 2023
14:00 SAST (UTC+2)

(1 BP) Scotland	38–7	Japan
Try: Penalty try 40' +3; Orr (2) 42' c, 79' m Grant 55' m Skeldon 61' c Bonar 66' c Con: Nelson (2/3) 44', 62'; Smith (1/2) 68'	Report	Try: I. Nagata 7' c Con: Otsuka (1/1) 8'

Athlone Stadium, Cape Town
Referee: Kat Roche (United States)

Team details

FB	15	Chloe Rollie
RW	14	Rhona Lloyd
OC	13	Emma Orr
IC	12	Lisa Thomson
LW	11	Francesca McGhie	(substituted off) 45'
FH	10	Helen Nelson	(substituted off) 63'
SH	9	Mairi McDonald	(substituted off) 47'
N8	8	Evie Gallagher
OF	7	Rachel McLachlan	(substituted off) 48'
BF	6	Rachel Malcolm
RL	5	Louise McMillan	(substituted off) 47'
LL	4	Emma Wassell
TP	3	Christine Belisle	(substituted off) 63'
HK	2	Lana Skeldon	(substituted off) 74'
LP	1	Leah Bartlett	(substituted off) 62'
Replacements:
HK	16	Elis Martin	(substituted on) 74'
PR	17	Anne Young	(substituted on) 62'
PR	18	Lisa Cockburn	(substituted on) 63'
LK	19	Sarah Bonar	(substituted on) 47'
N8	20	Jade Konkel-Roberts	(substituted on) 48'
SH	21	Caity Mattinson	(substituted on) 47'
CE	22	Meryl Smith	(substituted on) 63'
WG	23	Coreen Grant	(substituted on) 45'
Coach:
(Scotland) Bryan Easson

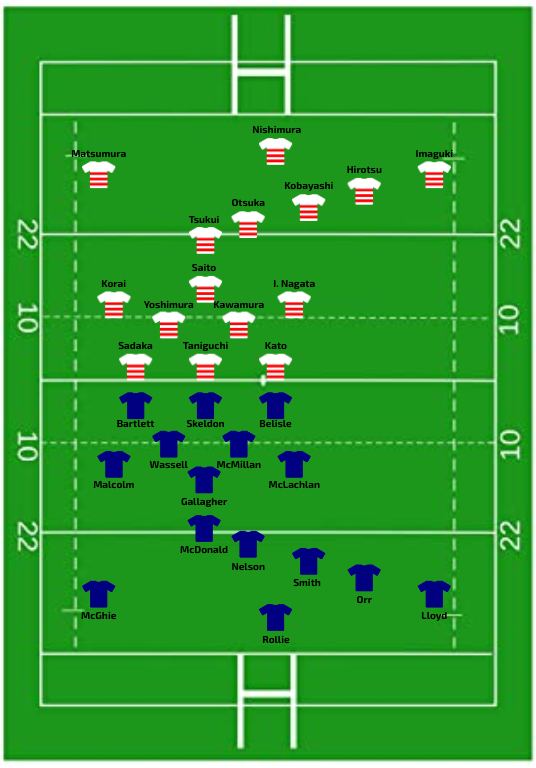

FB	15	Sora Nishimura		(substituted off) 56'
RW	14	Misaki Matsumura
OC	13	Haruka Hirotsu
IC	12	Kanako Kobayashi		(substituted off) 27'
LW	11	Komachi Imakugi
FH	10	Ayasa Otsuka
SH	9	Moe Tsukui
N8	8	Seina Saito		(substituted off) 54'
OF	7	Iroha Nagata (c)
BF	6	Sakurako Korai		(substituted off) 45'
RL	5	Otoka Yoshimura
LL	4	Masami Kawamura		(substituted off) 54'
TP	3	Yuka Sadaka		(substituted off) 43'
HK	2	Kotomi Taniguchi		(substituted off) 65'
LP	1	Sachiko Kato	(yellow card) 40+3' to 50'	(substituted off) 61'
Replacements:
PR	16	Hinata Komaki		(substituted on) 61'
HK	17	Asuka Kuge		(substituted on) 65'
PR	18	Nijiho Nagata		(substituted on) 43'
LK	19	Jennifer Nduka		(substituted on) 54'
FL	20	Ayano Nagai		(substituted on) 54'
SH	21	Kotono Yasuo		(substituted on) 51'
FH	22	Minori Yamamoto		(substituted on) 56'
FB	23	Nao Ando		(substituted on) 27'
Coach:
(Canada) Lesley McKenzie

Player of the Match:
Helen Nelson (Scotland)

Assistant referees:
Holly Wood (England)
Zoe Naude (South Africa)
Television match official:
Quinton Immelman (South Africa)

27 October 2023
16:30 SAST (UTC+2)

(1 BP) South Africa	33–7	Samoa
Try: Janse van Rensburg (3) 6' c, 24' c, 77' c Jacobs 12' m Dumke 39' c Con: Janse van Rensburg (4/5) 7', 26', 40' +1, 78'	Report	Try: Pauaraisa 72' c Con: Milo (1/1) 73'

Athlone Stadium, Cape Town
Referee: Clara Munarini (Italy)

Team details

FB	15	Byrhandre Dolf
RW	14	Veroeshka Grain
OC	13	Shaunique Hess
IC	12	Piwokuhle Nyanda
LW	11	Unathi Mali	(substituted off) 78'
FH	10	Libbie Janse van Rensburg
SH	9	Unam Tose	(substituted off) 61'
N8	8	Catha Jacobs	(substituted off) 63'
OF	7	Sinazo Mcatshulwa	(substituted off) 54'
BF	6	Lusanda Dumke
RL	5	Danelle Lochner	(substituted off) 53'
LL	4	Nolusindiso Booi
TP	3	Babalwa Latsha (c)	(substituted off) 56'
HK	2	Lindelwa Gwala	(substituted off) 56'
LP	1	Sanelisiwe Charlie	(substituted off) 56'
Replacements:
HK	16	Roseline Botes	(substituted on) 56'
PR	17	Asithandile Ntoyanto	(substituted on) 56'
PR	18	Yonela Ngxingolo	(substituted on) 56'
LK	19	Vainah Ubisi	(substituted on) 53'
FL	20	Rights Mkhari	(substituted on) 54'
SH	21	Nompumelelo Mathe	(substituted on) 63'
CE	22	Rumandi Potgieter	(substituted on) 61'
FB	23	Chuma Qawe	(substituted on) 78'
Coach:
(South Africa) Louis Koen

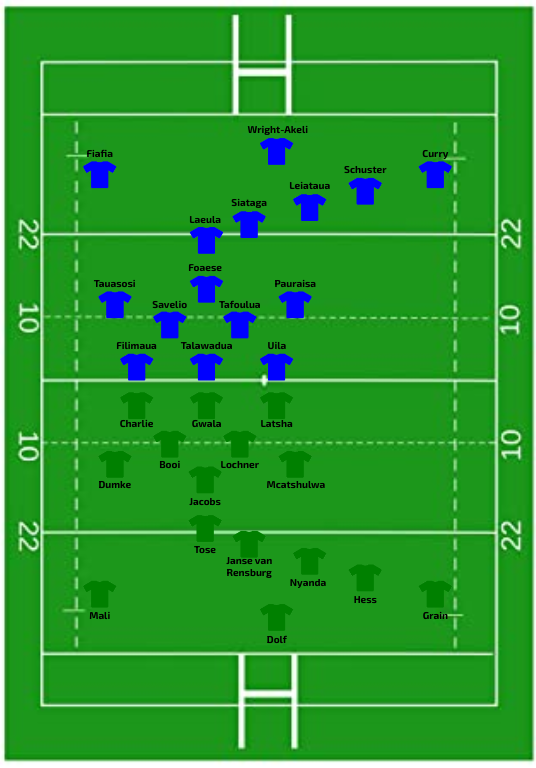

FB	15	Karla Wright-Akeli
RW	14	Linda Fiafia
OC	13	Hope Schuster
IC	12	Hasting Leiataua	(substituted off) 21'
LW	11	Michelle Curry	(substituted off) 56'
FH	10	Cassie Siataga
SH	9	Saelua Laeula	(substituted off) 47'
N8	8	Nina Foaese
OF	7	Sui Pauaraisa (c)	40' to 53'
BF	6	Ti Tauasosi	(substituted off) 27'
RL	5	Easter Savelio			(substituted off) 57'
LL	4	Olalini Tafoulua
TP	3	Avau Filimaua
HK	2	Sosoli Talawadua	(substituted off) 54'
LP	1	Angelica Uila	(substituted off) 47'
Replacements:
HK	16	Lulu Leuta	(substituted off) 54'
PR	17	Rereglory Aiono
PR	18	Maletina Brown	(substituted on) 47'
LK	19	Faalua Tugaga	(substituted on) 47'
FL	20	Utumalama Atonio	(substituted on) 40'	(substituted off) 53'	(substituted on) 57'
FL	21	Sinead Ryder	(substituted on) 27'
FH	22	Bella Milo	(substituted on) 21'
FB	23	Lutia Col Aumua	(substituted on) 56'
Coach:
(Samoa) Ramsey Tomokino

Player of the Match:
Libbie Janse van Rensburg (South Africa)

Assistant referees:
Aurélie Groizeleau (France)
Precious Pazani (Zimbabwe)
Television match official:
Leo Colgan (Ireland)

28 October 2023
17:00 SAST (UTC+2)

United States	8–30	Italy (1 BP)
Try: Brody 46' m Pen: Cantorna (1/1) 14'	Report	Try: Duca 28' c Ostuni Minuzzi 39' m Stefan 44' m D'Incà 52' m Giordano 58' m Con: Sillari (1/5) 29'; Pen: Sillari (1/1) 63'

Athlone Stadium, Cape Town
Referee: Natarsha Ganley (New Zealand)

Team details

FB	15	Tess Feury
RW	14	Summer Harris-Jones
OC	13	Kate Zackary (c)
IC	12	Katana Howard	(substituted off) 56'
LW	11	Lotte Clapp
FH	10	Gabby Cantorna	(substituted off) 40'
SH	9	Taina Tukuafu	(substituted off) 67'
N8	8	Rachel Johnson
OF	7	Tahlia Brody
BF	6	Freda Tafuna	(substituted off) 64'
RL	5	Erica Jarrell	(substituted off) 73'
LL	4	Hallie Taufo'ou
TP	3	Keia Mae Sagapolu	(substituted off) 56'
HK	2	Paige Stathopolous	(substituted off) 49'
LP	1	Catherine Benson	(substituted off) 64'
Replacements:
HK	16	Kathryn Treder	(substituted on) 49'
PR	17	Alivia Leatherman	(substituted on) 64'
PR	18	Charli Jacoby	(substituted on) 56'
LK	19	Jenny Kronish	(substituted on) 64'
FL	20	Rachel Ehrecke	(substituted on) 73'
SH	21	Carly Waters	(substituted on) 67'
CE	22	Kristin Bitter	(substituted on) 40'
WG	23	Emily Henrich	(substituted on) 56'
Coach:
(New Zealand) Milton Haig

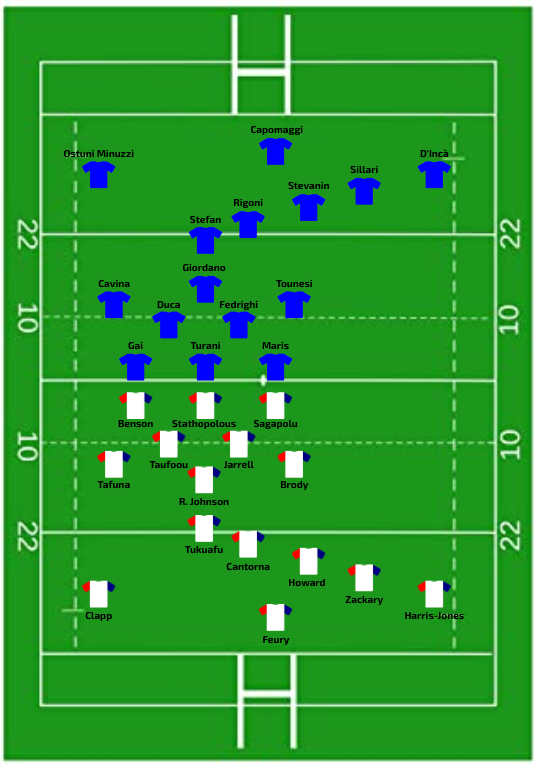

FB	15	Beatrice Capomaggi	(substituted off) 73'
RW	14	Vittoria Ostuni Minuzzi
OC	13	Michela Sillari
IC	12	Emma Stevanin	(substituted off) 64'
LW	11	Alyssa D'Incà
FH	10	Beatrice Rigoni
SH	9	Sofia Stefan
N8	8	Elisa Giordano (c)
OF	7	Giulia Cavina	(substituted off) 64'
BF	6	Sara Tounesi	(substituted off) 56'
RL	5	Giordana Duca
LL	4	Valeria Fedrighi
TP	3	Lucia Gai	(substituted off) 64'
HK	2	Silvia Turani	(substituted off) 71'
LP	1	Gaia Maris	(substituted off) 67'
Replacements:
HK	16	Laura Gurioli	(substituted on) 71'
PR	17	Emanuela Stecca	(substituted on) 67'
PR	18	Alessia Pilani	(substituted on) 64'
FL	19	Isabella Locatelli	(substituted on) 56'
FL	20	Alissa Ranuccini	(substituted on) 64'
SH	21	Nicole Mastrangelo
FH	22	Veronica Madia	(substituted on) 64'
WG	23	Sofia Catellani	(substituted on) 73'
Coach:
(Italy) Giovanni Raineri

Assistant referees:
Aurélie Groizeleau (France)
Zoe Naude (South Africa)
Television match official:
Leo Colgan (Ireland)

Notes:

- Valeria Fedrighi (Italy) earned her 50th test cap.
- This was Italy's largest win over the United States.
- In order to win the title, Italy were required to win with a bonus point and win by 25 points. As they won only by 22 points, Scotland claimed their inaugural WXV 2 title, their first major tournament win since the 2001 European Championship.

== WXV 3 ==
2023 WXV 3

Tournament details
- Host: United Arab Emirates
- Dates: 13 — 28 October 2023
- Teams: Colombia; Fiji; Ireland; Kazakhstan; Kenya; Spain

Final positions
- Champions: Ireland (1st title)
- Runner-up: Fiji

Tournament statistics
- Matches played: 9
- Tries scored: 79 (8.78 per match)
- Top scorer(s): (Fiji) Luisa Tisolo (55)
- Most tries: (Ireland) Beibhinn Parsons (6)

The 2023 WXV 3 was hosted entirely at The Sevens Stadium in Dubai between 13 and 28 October 2023. Like WXV 2, each round featured a Friday double-header, followed by a Saturday match. Fiji, Ireland and Kenya played matches against Colombia, Kazakhstan and Spain.

Ireland's victory, and the relegation of Samoa from WXV 2, means that Europe gain a place in WXV 2 for 2024 at the expense of Oceania. The fourth and fifth team in the 2024 Six Nations will both automatically qualify for WXV 2, with the sixth place team facing the winner of the Rugby Europe Women's Championship for a place in WXV 3. The winner and runner up in the Oceania Cup will both enter WXV 3 for 2024.

2023 WXV 3 table
Pos	Team	Pld	W	D	L	PF	PA	PD	TF	TA	TB	LB	Pts
1	Ireland (C)	3	3	0	0	188	16	+172	29	1	2	0	14
2	Fiji	3	2	0	1	204	39	+165	32	4	2	1	11
3	Spain	3	2	0	1	71	34	+37	8	5	1	1	10
4	Kenya	3	1	0	2	33	55	−22	5	8	0	1	5
5	Kazakhstan	3	1	0	2	18	239	−221	3	37	0	0	4
6	Colombia (R)	3	0	0	3	21	152	−131	2	24	0	0	0

(C) Champions, regional position is promoted; (R) Entered into a relegation play-off

=== Round 1 ===
13 October 2023
17:00 GST (UTC+4)

(1 BP) Fiji	67–13	Colombia
Try: Nakesa 4' c Waisega (2) 22' c, 53' m Arei (2) 26' c, 71' m Korovata 32' m Tisolo 35' m Naisewa 47' c Milinia 58' c Neivosa 76' c Cumu 80' +1 m Con: Tisolo (6/11) 5', 24', 26', 48', 59', 76'	Report	Try: Lopera 78' c Con: Arzuaga (1/1) 79'; Pen: Arzuaga (2/2) 30', 55'

The Sevens Stadium, Dubai
Referee: Amelia Luciano (United States)

Team details

FB	15	Luisa Tisolo	(yellow card) 64' to 74'
RW	14	Adita Milinia
OC	13	Salanieta Kinita		(substituted off) 55'
IC	12	Vani Arei
LW	11	Iva Sauira		(substituted off) 67'
FH	10	Jennifer Ravutia		(substituted off) 55'
SH	9	Setaita Railumu		(substituted off) 67'
N8	8	Sereima Leweniqila (c)
OF	7	Sulita Waisega		(substituted off) 67'
BF	6	Merevesi Ofakimalino
RL	5	Mereoni Nakesa
LL	4	Doreen Narokete
TP	3	Karalaini Naisewa		(substituted off) 55'
HK	2	Bitila Tawake		(substituted off) 55'
LP	1	Ana Korovata		(substituted off) 55'
Replacements:
HK	16	Unaisi Lalabalavu		(substituted on) 55'
PR	17	Tiana Robanakadavu		(substituted on) 55'
PR	18	Salanieta Nabuli		(substituted on) 55'
LK	19	Nunia Daunimoala		(substituted on) 55'
FL	20	Adi Fulori Rotagavira		(substituted on) 67'
SH	21	Evivi Senikarivi		(substituted on) 67'
FH	22	Merewai Cumu		(substituted on) 55'
FB	23	Merewairita Neivosa		(substituted on) 67'
Coach:
(Fiji) Inoke Male

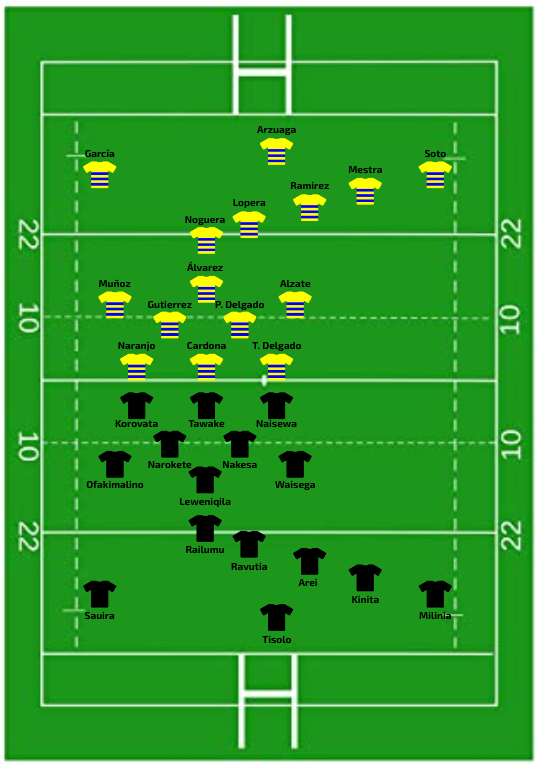

FB	15	Maria I. Arzuaga
RW	14	Leidy García	(substituted off) 55'
OC	13	Maribel Mestra
IC	12	Isabel Ramirez
LW	11	Juliana Soto
FH	10	Camila Lopera (c)
SH	9	Laura Villota Noguera	(substituted off) 76'
N8	8	Valentina Álvarez
OF	7	Angela Alzate	(substituted off) 55'
BF	6	Valeria Muñoz
RL	5	Laura Gutierrez	(substituted off) 55'
LL	4	Paola Delgado
TP	3	Carolina Naranjo	(substituted off) 48'
HK	2	Camila Cardona	(substituted off) 45'
LP	1	Tatiana Delgado	(substituted off) 48'
Replacements:
HK	16	Silvia Olave	(substituted on) 45'
PR	17	Natalia Barajas	(substituted on) 48'
PR	18	Gisel Gomez	(substituted on) 48'
LK	19	Sara Velez	(substituted on) 55'
FL	20	Tatiana Hernandez	(substituted on) 55'
SH	21	Stefania Sarmiento	(substituted on) 76'
FH	22	Luisa Fernanda Zurique
FB	23	Angie Manyoma	(substituted on) 55'
Coach:
(Colombia) Lissette Martínez

Player of the Match:
Luisa Tisolo (Fiji)

Assistant referees:
Adele Robert (Belgium)
Sunny Lee (Hong Kong)
Television match official:
Andrew Hosie (Canada)
Notes:

- This was the first meeting between the two nations.

13 October 2023
19:30 GST (UTC+4)

(1 BP) Ireland	109–0	Kazakhstan
Try: Haney 2' c Deely 10' m Higgins (4) 16' m, 34' c, 46' c, 79' c Djougang 24' c Parsons (4) 30' c, 55' c, 61' m, 70' c Scuffil-McCabe 37' c Moore 40' c Dalton (2) 52' c, 68' c Hogan 58' m Delaney 75' m Con: O'Brien (6/9) 3', 24', 32', 35', 40' +1, 47'; Fowley (6/8) 53', 56', 60', 69', 72', 80'	Report

The Sevens Stadium, Dubai
Referee: Doriane Domenjo (France)

Team details

FB	15	Méabh Deely
RW	14	Natasja Behan	(substituted off) 40'
OC	13	Eve Higgins
IC	12	Aoife Dalton
LW	11	Beibhinn Parsons
FH	10	Dannah O'Brien	(substituted off) 50'
SH	9	Molly Scuffil-McCabe	(substituted off) 50'
N8	8	Brittany Hogan
OF	7	Edel McMahon (cc)
BF	6	Grace Moore	(substituted off) 57'
RL	5	Sam Monaghan (cc)	(substituted off) 40'
LL	4	Dorothy Wall
TP	3	Christy Haney	(substituted off) 62'
HK	2	Neve Jones	(substituted off) 74'
LP	1	Linda Djougang	(substituted off) 52'
Replacements:
HK	16	Sarah Delaney	(substituted on) 74'
PR	17	Sadhbh McGrath	(substituted on) 52'
PR	18	Meg Collis	(substituted on) 62'
LK	19	Eimear Corri	(substituted on) 40'
FL	20	Maeve Óg O'Leary	(substituted on) 57'
SH	21	Aoibheann Reilly	(substituted on) 50'
FH	22	Nicole Fowley	(substituted on) 50'
WG	23	Leah Tarpey	(substituted on) 40'
Coach:
(England) Scott Bemand

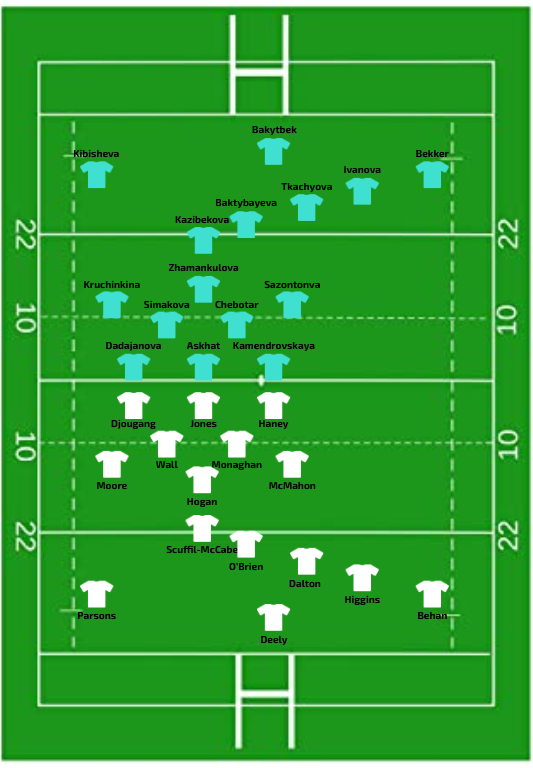

FB	15	Gulim Bakytbek
RW	14	Liliya Kibisheva
OC	13	Lyudmila Ivanova		(substituted off) 75'
IC	12	Darya Tkachyova
LW	11	Alyona Melnikova		(substituted off) 56'
FH	10	Kundyzay Baktybayeva
SH	9	Daiana Kazibekova
N8	8	Symbat Zhamankulova		(substituted off) 79'
OF	7	Karina Sazontova (c)	(yellow card) 44' to 56'
BF	6	Tatyana Kruchinkina
RL	5	Darya Simakova		(substituted off) 40'
LL	4	Anna Chebotar	(yellow card) 56' to 66'	(substituted off) 80'
TP	3	Tatyana Dadajanova		(substituted off) 79'
HK	2	Moldir Askhat
LP	1	Natalya Kamendrovskaya		(substituted off) 51'
Replacements:
HK	16	Yelena Yurova
PR	17	Balzhan Akhbayeva		(substituted on) 79'
PR	18	Karina Tankisheva		(substituted on) 51'
LK	19	Yuliya Oleinikova		(substituted on) 56'
FL	20	Daria Kuznetsova		(substituted on) 80'
SH	21	Svetlana Malezhina		(substituted on) 56'
FH	22	Kuralay Turalykova
WG	23	Irina Balabina		(substituted on) 40'
Coach:
(Kazakhstan) Makhabbat Tugambekova

Player of the Match:
Beibhinn Parsons (Ireland)

Assistant referees:
Ano Kuwai (Japan)
Ella Goldsmith (Australia)
Television match official:
Matteo Liperini (Italy)

Notes:

- Meg Collis, Eimear Corri and Sarah Delaney made their debuts for Ireland, while Anna Chebotar, Tatyana Dadajanova, Tatyana Kruchinkina and Daria Kuznetsova made their debuts for Kazakhstan.
- Yeva Bekker was originally named on the right wing for Kazakhstan, but withdrew before kick-off. She was replaced by Alyona Melnikova, whose place on the bench was taken by Kuralay Turalykova, who moved from 23 to 22. The 23 spot was then taken by Irina Balabina.
- This was Ireland's largest ever win, surpassing their 73–3 defeat of Scotland in the 2015 Six Nations, and their inaugural score of 100 points.
- This was Kazakhstan's largest defeat, surpassing their 82–0 defeat to England in the 2010 World Cup.

14 October 2023
17:00 GST (UTC+4)

(1 BP) Spain	32–0	Kenya
Try: Blanco Herrera 2' c Calvo 7' c C. Pérez 31' m Gorrochategui 55' c Con: Argudo (2/3) 3', 8'; Z. Pérez (1/1) 56'; Pen: Argudo (1/1) 28'; Z. Pérez (1/1) 64'	Report

The Sevens Stadium, Dubai
Referee: Maria Latos (Germany)

Team details

FB	15	Amalia Argudo	(substituted off) 48'
RW	14	Claudia Pérez
OC	13	Alba Vinuesa
IC	12	Iciar Pozo Eizaguirre
LW	11	Claudia Peña Hidalgo	(substituted off) 63'
FH	10	Ines Bueso-Inchausti
SH	9	Ariadna Vergara Piqueras
N8	8	María Calvo
OF	7	Alba Capell	(substituted off) 56'
BF	6	Vico Gorrochategui
RL	5	Carmen Castellucci	(substituted off) 63'
LL	4	Anna Puig
TP	3	Sidorella Bracic Rodriguez	(substituted off) 48'
HK	2	Cristina Blanco Herrera (c)	(substituted off) 48'
LP	1	Maria Del Castillo	(substituted off) 48'
Replacements:
HK	16	Maria Roman Mallen	(substituted on) 48'
PR	17	Ines Antolinez Fernandez	(substituted on) 48'
PR	18	Laura Delgado	(substituted on) 48'
LK	19	Leyre Bianchi	(substituted on) 63'
FL	20	Nadina Cisa	(substituted on) 56'
SH	21	Maider Aresti Felix	(substituted on) 63'
FH	22	Zahía Pérez	(substituted on) 48'
FB	23	Clara Piquero	(substituted on) 48'
Coach:
(Spain) Juan González Marruecos

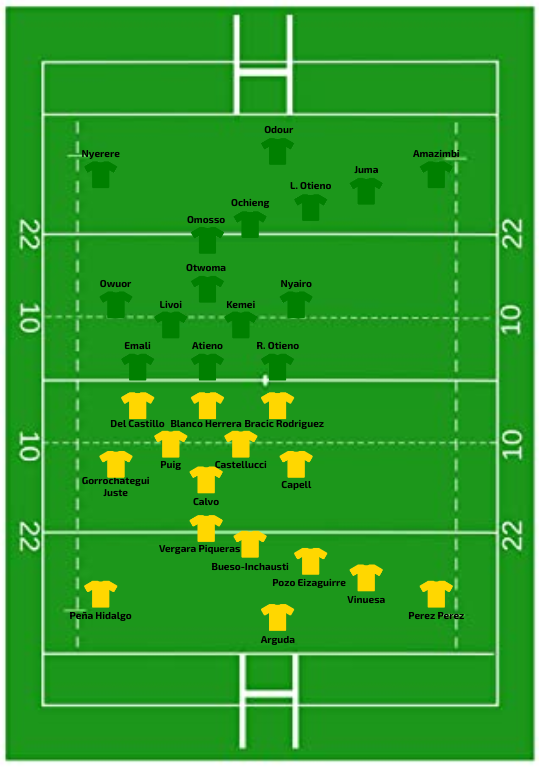

FB	15	Freshia Odour	(substituted off) 65'
RW	14	Prisca Nyerere
OC	13	Esther Juma	(substituted off) 54'
IC	12	Laurine Otieno	(substituted off) 68'
LW	11	Lewin Amazimbi
FH	10	Ann Ochieng
SH	9	Diana Omosso
N8	8	Knight Otwoma (c)	(substituted off) 46'
OF	7	Diana Nyairo
BF	6	Mitchelle Owuor	(substituted off) 61'
RL	5	Faith Livoi
LL	4	Naomi Kemei
TP	3	Natasha Emali	(substituted off) 61'
HK	2	Staycy Atieno	(substituted off) 57'
LP	1	Rose Otieno	(substituted off) 56'
Replacements:
HK	16	Naomi Muhanji	(substituted on) 57'
PR	17	Evelyne Luganu	(substituted on) 56'
PR	18	Valentine Otieno	(substituted on) 61'
LK	19	Hesslah Khisa	(substituted on) 61'
FL	20	Maureen Chebet
SH	21	Winnie Owino	(substituted on) 65'
FH	22	Edith Nariaka	(substituted on) 54'
FB	23	Jamari Agatha	(substituted on) 68'
Coach:
(Kenya) Dennis Mwanja

Player of the Match:
Alba Capell (Spain)

Assistant referees:
Ella Goldsmith (Australia)
Sunny Lee (Hong Kong)
Television match official:
Andrew Hosie (Canada)

=== Round 2 ===
20 October 2023
17:00 GST (UTC+4)

Kazakhstan	18–12	Kenya (1 BP)
Try: Kazibekova 5' m Dadajanova 22' m Bekker 50' m Pen: Bakytbek (1/1) 64'	Report	Try: Wafula 66' c Nyerere 73' m Con: Okulu (1/2) 67'

The Sevens Stadium, Dubai
Referee: Adele Robert (Belgium)

Team details

FB	15	Gulim Bakytbek
RW	14	Darya Tkachyova
OC	13	Yeva Bekker
IC	12	Lyudmila Ivanova
LW	11	Liliya Kibisheva
FH	10	Kundyzay Baktybayeva	(substituted off) 63'
SH	9	Daiana Kazibekova
N8	8	Karina Sazontova (c)
OF	7	Tatyana Dadajanova	(substituted off) 59'
BF	6	Tatyana Kruchinkina	(substituted off) 80'
RL	5	Symbat Zhamankulova	(substituted off) 80'
LL	4	Anna Chebotar
TP	3	Natalya Kamendrovskaya
HK	2	Moldir Askhat	(substituted off) 68'
LP	1	Yelena Yurova
Replacements:
HK	16	Karina Tankisheva	(substituted on) 68'
PR	17	Balzhan Akhbayeva
PR	18	Yuliya Oleinikova
LK	19	Svetlana Malezhina	(substituted on) 80'
FL	20	Kuralay Turalykova	(substituted on) 68'
SH	21	Anastassiya Yevdokimova
FH	22	Daria Kuznetsova	(substituted on) 63'
FB	23	Milana Kotova
Coach:
(Kazakhstan) Makhabbat Tugambekova

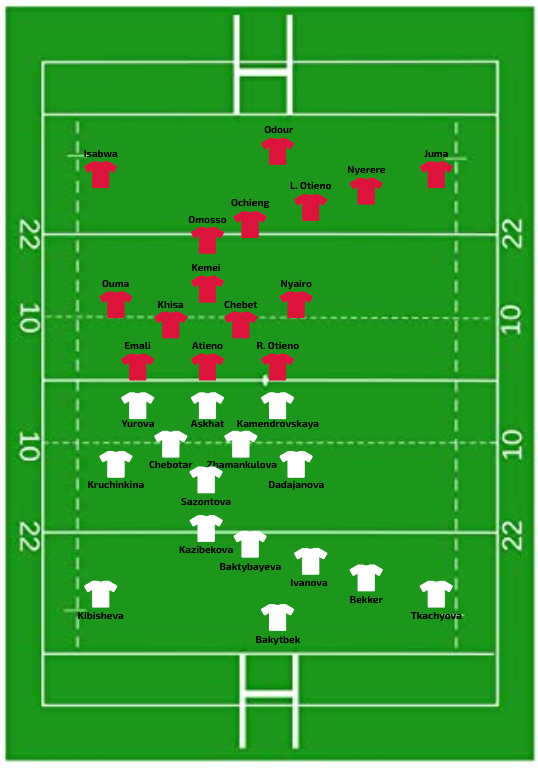

FB	15	Freshia Odour		(substituted off) 40'
RW	14	Terry Isabwa
OC	13	Prisca Nyerere
IC	12	Laurine Otieno		(substituted off) 53'
LW	11	Esther Juma
FH	10	Ann Ochieng		(substituted off) 64'
SH	9	Diana Omosso
N8	8	Naomi Kemei
OF	7	Diana Nyairo		(substituted off) 69'
BF	6	Enid Ouma (c)		(substituted off) 40'
RL	5	Hesslah Khisa
LL	4	Maureen Chebet
TP	3	Natasha Emali		(substituted off) 64'
HK	2	Staycy Atieno		(substituted off) 64'
LP	1	Rose Otieno		(substituted off) 64'
Replacements:
HK	16	Naomi Muhanji		(substituted on) 64'
PR	17	Mercy Migongo		(substituted on) 64'
PR	18	Evelyne Luganu		(substituted on) 64'
LK	19	Mitchelle Owuor		(substituted on) 69'
FL	20	Phoebe Otieno		(substituted on) 40'
SH	21	Judith Okumu		(substituted on) 64'
FH	22	Grace Okulu	(yellow card) 49' to 59'	(substituted on) 40'
FB	23	Stella Wafula		(substituted on) 53'
Coach:
(Kenya) Dennis Mwanja

Assistant referees:
Doriane Domenjo (France)
Sunny Lee (Hong Kong)
Television match official:
Matteo Liperini (Italy)

Notes:

- This was the first meeting between the two nations.

20 October 2023
19:30 GST (UTC+4)

Spain	26–19	Fiji (1 BP)
Try: Peña Hidalgo (3) 36' m, 57' c, 75' m Con: Argudo (1/3) 58'; Pen: Argudo (3/3) 4', 13', 23'	Report	Try: Milinia 7' m Arei 32' c Ralivanawa 78' c Con: Tisolo (2/3) 33', 78'

The Sevens Stadium, Dubai
Referee: Ella Goldsmith (Australia)

Team details

FB	15	Amalia Argudo
RW	14	Claudia Pérez	(yellow card) 71' to end'
OC	13	Claudia Peña Hidalgo
IC	12	Iciar Pozo Eizaguirre		(substituted off) 40'
LW	11	Clara Piquero		(substituted off) 61'
FH	10	Ines Bueso-Inchausti
SH	9	Ariadna Vergara Piqueras		(substituted off) 34'
N8	8	María Calvo
OF	7	Alba Capell		(substituted off) 40'
BF	6	Nerea García Rementeria
RL	5	Carmen Castellucci
LL	4	Anna Puig		(substituted off) 76'
TP	3	Laura Delgado		(substituted off) 61'
HK	2	Cristina Blanco Herrera (c)		(substituted off) 72'
LP	1	Ines Antolinez Fernandez		(substituted off) 60'
Replacements:
HK	16	Maria Roman Mallen		(substituted on) 72'
PR	17	Maria Del Castillo		(substituted on) 60'
PR	18	Sidorella Bracic Rodriguez		(substituted on) 61'
LK	19	Beatriz Rivera
FL	20	Nadina Cisa		(substituted on) 76'
SH	21	Julia Castro
FH	22	Zahía Pérez		(substituted on) 40'
FB	23	Alba Vinuesa		(substituted on) 61'
Coach:
(Spain) Juan González Marruecos

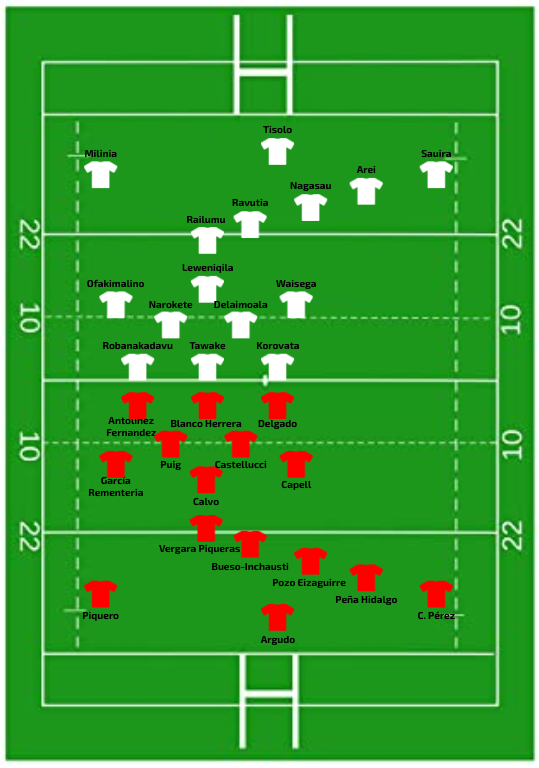

FB	15	Luisa Tisolo
RW	14	Adita Milinia
OC	13	Vani Arei		(substituted off) 59'
IC	12	Rusila Nagasau
LW	11	Iva Sauira
FH	10	Jennifer Ravutia		(substituted off) 38'
SH	9	Setaita Railumu		(substituted off) 46'
N8	8	Sereima Leweniqila (c)
OF	7	Sulita Waisega
BF	6	Merevesi Ofakimalino	(yellow card) 74' to end'
RL	5	Doreen Narokete		(substituted off) 51'
LL	4	Nunia Delaimoala		(substituted off) 62'
TP	3	Tiana Robanakadavu		(substituted off) 46'
HK	2	Bitila Tawake		(substituted off) 51'
LP	1	Ana Korovata		(substituted off) 69'
Replacements:
HK	16	Unaisi Lalabalavu		(substituted on) 51'
PR	17	Loraini Senivutu		(substituted on) 69'
PR	18	Penina Turova		(substituted on) 62'
LK	19	Mereoni Nakesa		(substituted on) 51'
FL	20	Karalaini Naisewa		(substituted on) 46'
SH	21	Evivi Senikarivi		(substituted on) 46'
FH	22	Merewairita Neivosa		(substituted on) 38'
FB	23	Atelaite Ralivanawa		(substituted on) 59'
Coach:
(Fiji) Inoke Male

Player of the Match:
Carmen Castellucci (Spain)

Assistant referees:
Amelia Luciano (United States)
Maria Latos (Germany)
Television match official:
Andrew Hosie (Canada)

Notes:

- This was the first meeting between the two nations.

21 October 2023
17:00 GST (UTC+4)

(1 BP) Ireland	64–3	Colombia
Try: Jones (2) 3' c, 51' c Behan 11' m Moore 17' m Deely 23' c Hogan 25' c McMahon 38' c Parsons (2) 42' m, 69' c Tarpey 74' c Con: O'Brien (5/8) 4', 23', 26', 39', 53'; Deely (2/2) 70', 75'	Report	Pen: Arzuaga (1/1) 62'

The Sevens Stadium, Dubai
Referee: Ano Kuwai (Japan)

Team details

FB	15	Méabh Deely
RW	14	Beibhinn Parsons
OC	13	Eve Higgins
IC	12	Aoife Dalton
LW	11	Natasja Behan
FH	10	Dannah O'Brien
SH	9	Aoibheann Reilly	(substituted off) 61'
N8	8	Brittany Hogan	(substituted off) 62'
OF	7	Edel McMahon (cc)
BF	6	Grace Moore
RL	5	Sam Monaghan (cc)
LL	4	Eimear Corri	(substituted off) 53'
TP	3	Christy Haney	(substituted off) 53'
HK	2	Neve Jones	(substituted off) 70'
LP	1	Linda Djougang	(substituted off) 70'
Replacements:
HK	16	Sarah Delaney	(substituted on) 70'
PR	17	Niamh O'Dowd	(substituted on) 70'
PR	18	Sadhbh McGrath	(substituted on) 53'
LK	19	Fiona Tuite	(substituted on) 53'
FL	20	Dorothy Wall	(substituted on) 62'
SH	21	Molly Scuffil-McCabe	(substituted on) 61'
FH	22	Clara Barrett	(substituted on) 61'
WG	23	Leah Tarpey	(substituted on) 53'
Coach:
(England) Scott Bemand

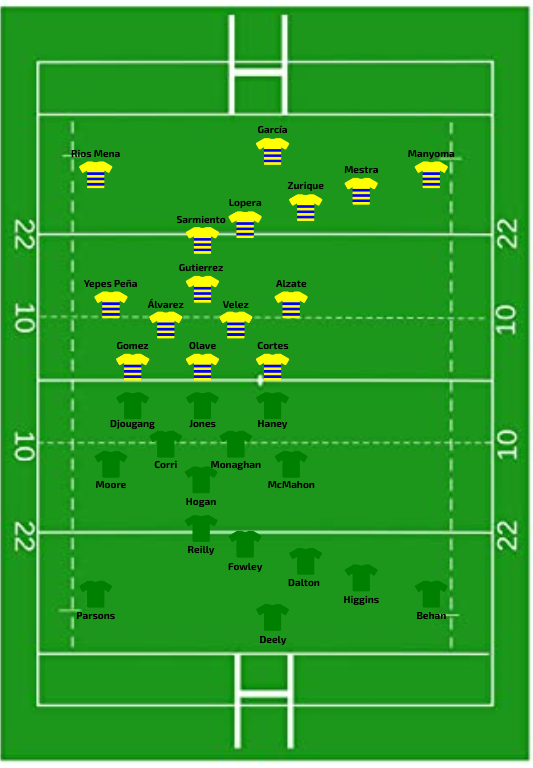

FB	15	Leidy García
RW	14	Melisa Rios Mena
OC	13	Maribel Mestra	(substituted off) 56'
IC	12	Luisa Fernanda Zurique
LW	11	Angie Manyoma
FH	10	Camila Lopera (c)	(substituted off) 65'
SH	9	Stefania Sarmiento	(substituted off) 40'
N8	8	Laura Gutierrez
OF	7	Angela Alzate	(substituted off) 65'
BF	6	Valentina Yepes Peña
RL	5	Valentina Álvarez	(substituted off) 65'
LL	4	Sara Velez
TP	3	Gisel Gomez	(substituted off) 40'
HK	2	Silvia Olave	(substituted off) 65'
LP	1	Maria Antonia Cortes	(substituted off) 40'
Replacements:
HK	16	Natalia Caisedo	(substituted on) 65'
PR	17	Natalia Barajas	(substituted on) 40'
PR	18	Carolina Naranjo	(substituted on) 40'
LK	19	Daniela Roman Quintero	(substituted on) 65'
FL	20	Valeria Muñoz	(substituted on) 65'
SH	21	Laura Villota Noguera	(substituted on) 40'
FH	22	Sofia Granados Cardenas	(substituted on) 65'
FB	23	Maria I. Arzuaga	(substituted on) 56'
Coach:
(Colombia) Lissette Martínez

Player of the Match:
Neve Jones (Ireland)

Assistant referees:
Maria Latos (Germany)
Sunny Lee (Hong Kong)
Television match official:
Matteo Liperini (Italy)

Notes:

- This was the first meeting between the two nations.
- Clara Barrett (Ireland) made her international debut.
- Nicole Fowley was named as fly-half for Ireland but withdrew before kick-off. She was replaced by Dannah O'Brien, whose place on the bench was taken by Clara Barrett.
- Meg Collis was named on the bench for Ireland but also withdrew before kick-off, and was replaced by Sadhbh McGrath.

=== Round 3 ===
27 October 2023
17:00 GST (UTC+4)

Kazakhstan	0–118	Fiji (1 BP)
	Report	Try: Milinia (4) 3' c, 7' c, 15' c, 74' m Ralivanawa (2) 20' c, 38' c Tinanivalu 24' m Cumu 30' c Neivosa (3) 34' c, 70' c, 79' c Tisolo (2) 36' c, 51' c Senikarivi 47' m Nagasau 57' c Kinita 59' c Leweniqila 62' m Korovata 66' c Con: Tisolo (12/16) 4', 8', 16', 21', 31', 35', 37', 39', 58', 63', 67', 71'; Nagasau (1/1) 60'; Vosadrau (1/1) 79'

The Sevens Stadium, Dubai
Referee: Amelia Luciano (United States)

Team details

FB	15	Gulim Bakytbek	(substituted off) 32'
RW	14	Darya Tkachyova	(substituted off) 60'
OC	13	Yeva Bekker
IC	12	Lyudmila Ivanova
LW	11	Liliya Kibisheva
FH	10	Kundyzay Baktybayeva	(substituted off) 67'
SH	9	Daiana Kazibekova
N8	8	Symbat Zhamankulova
OF	7	Svetlana Malezhina
BF	6	Tatyana Kruchinkina
RL	5	Karina Sazontova (c)	(substituted off) 17'
LL	4	Anna Chebotar	(substituted off) 46'
TP	3	Natalya Kamendrovskaya	(substituted off) 68'
HK	2	Moldir Askhat	(substituted off) 60'
LP	1	Tatyana Dadajanova	(substituted off) 40'
Replacements:
HK	16	Karina Tankisheva	(substituted on) 60'
PR	17	Balzhan Akhbayeva	(substituted on) 40'
PR	18	Yelena Yurova	(substituted on) 68'
LK	19	Yuliya Oleinikova	(substituted on) 17'
FL	20	Anastassiya Yevdokimova	(substituted on) 32'
FL	21	Irina Balabina	(substituted on) 46'
SH	22	Daria Kuznetsova	(substituted on) 60'
FB	23	Milana Kotova
Coach:
(Kazakhstan) Makhabbat Tugambekova

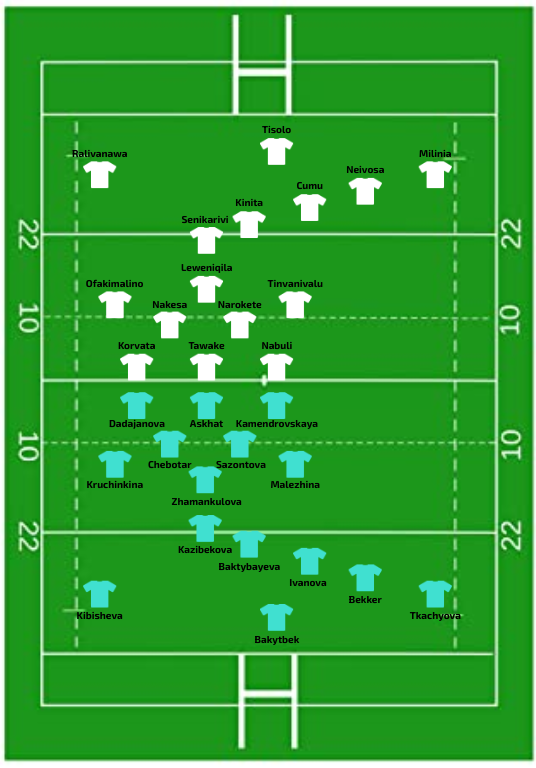

FB	15	Luisa Tisolo
RW	14	Atelaite Ralivanawa		(substituted off) 67'
OC	13	Merewairita Neivosa
IC	12	Merewai Cumu
LW	11	Adita Milinia		(substituted off) 67'
FH	10	Salanieta Kinita
SH	9	Evivi Senikarivi		(substituted off) 67'
N8	8	Sereima Leweniqila (c)
OF	7	Teresia Tinanivalu		(substituted off) 67'
BF	6	Merevesi Ofakimalino		(substituted off) 19'
RL	5	Mereoni Nakesa
LL	4	Doreen Narokete		(substituted off) 67'
TP	3	Ana Korovata		(substituted off) 74'
HK	2	Bitila Tawake	(yellow card) 17' to 18'	(substituted off) 61'
LP	1	Salanieta Nabuli		(substituted off) 67'
Replacements:
HK	16	Unaisi Lalabalavu		(substituted on) 61'
PR	17	Loraini Senivutu		(substituted on) 67'
PR	18	Karalaini Naisewa		(substituted on) 74'
LK	19	Nunia Delaimoala		(substituted on) 67'
FL	20	Adi Fulori Rotagavira		(substituted on) 19'
SH	21	Wainikiti Vosadrau		(substituted on) 67'
FH	22	Rusila Nagasau		(substituted on) 67'
FB	23	Mary Lala Jane Kanace		(substituted on) 67'
Coach:
(Fiji) Inoke Male

Player of the Match:
Sereima Leweniqila (Fiji)

Assistant referees:
Ano Kuwai (Japan)
Sunny Lee (Hong Kong)
Television match official:
Matteo Liperini (Italy)

Notes:

- This was the first meeting between the two nations.
- This was Kazakhstan's largest ever loss, surpassing the 109–0 defeat to Ireland a fortnight earlier.

27 October 2023
19:30 GST (UTC+4)

Kenya	21–5	Colombia
Try: Auma (2) 6' m, 38' m R. Otieno 24' m Pen: Ochieng (1/1) 75'; Drop: Ochieng (1/1) 75'	Report	Try: Soto 34' m

The Sevens Stadium, Dubai
Referee: Marie Latos (Germany)

Team details

FB	15	Diana Omosso
RW	14	Sharon Auma
OC	13	Prisca Nyerere	(substituted off) 54'
IC	12	Stella Wafula	(substituted off) 73'
LW	11	Terry Isabwa
FH	10	Ann Ochieng
SH	9	Judith Okumu
N8	8	Phoebe Otieno
OF	7	Diana Nyairo	(substituted off) 77'
BF	6	Enid Ouma (c)	(substituted off) 68'
RL	5	Naomi Kemei	(substituted off) 78'
LL	4	Maureen Chebet
TP	3	Natasha Emali	(substituted off) 77'
HK	2	Naomi Muhanji	(substituted off) 71'
LP	1	Rose Otieno	(substituted off) 73'
Replacements:
HK	16	Knight Otwoma	(substituted on) 71'
PR	17	Valentine Otieno	(substituted on) 73'
PR	18	Evelyne Luganu	(substituted on) 77'
LK	19	Faith Livoi	(substituted on) 78'
FL	20	Hesslah Khisa	(substituted on) 68'
FL	21	Edith Nariaka	(substituted on) 77'
CE	22	Esther Juma	(substituted on) 54'
WG	23	Mitchelle Owuor	(substituted on) 77'
Coach:
(Kenya) Dennis Mwanja

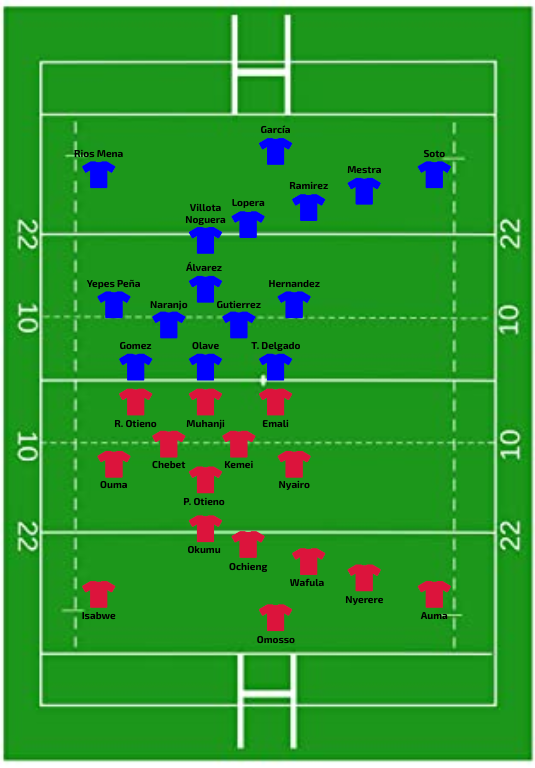

FB	15	Leidy García
RW	14	Melisa Rios Mena		(substituted off) 67'
OC	13	Maribel Mestra	(yellow card) 62' to 72'
IC	12	Isabel Ramirez		(substituted off) 40'
LW	11	Juliana Soto
FH	10	Camila Lopera (c)
SH	9	Laura Villota Noguera		(substituted off) 51'
N8	8	Valentina Álvarez
OF	7	Tatiana Hernandez
BF	6	Valentina Yepes Peña		(substituted off) 48'
RL	5	Carolina Naranjo		(substituted off) 40'
LL	4	Laura Gutierrez
TP	3	Gisel Gomez		(substituted off) 64'
HK	2	Silvia Olave		(substituted off) 48'
LP	1	Tatiana Delgado		(substituted off) 48'
Replacements:
HK	16	Natalia Caisedo		(substituted on) 48'
PR	17	Natalia Barajas		(substituted on) 48'
PR	18	Camila Cardona		(substituted on) 64'
LK	19	Valeria Moñoz		(substituted on) 48'
FL	20	Angela Alzate		(substituted on) 40'
SH	21	Stefania Sarmiento		(substituted on) 51'
FH	22	Maria I. Arzuaga		(substituted on) 40'
WG	23	Angie Manyoma		(substituted on) 67'
Coach:
(Colombia) Lissette Martínez

Assistant referees:
Adele Robert (Belgium)
Ella Goldsmith (Australia)
Television match official:
Andrew Hosie (Canada)

Notes:

- This was Kenya's first win over Colombia.

28 October 2023
17:00 GST (UTC+4)

Ireland	15–13	Spain (1 BP)
Try: Moore 60' c Jones 75' m Con: O'Brien (1/2) 61'; Pen: O'Brien (1/1) 35'	Report	Try: Peña Hidalgo 10' c Con: Argudo (1/1) 11'; Pen: Argudo (2/2) 24', 40' +1

The Sevens Stadium, Dubai
Referee: Doriane Domenjo (France)

Team details

FB	15	Méabh Deely
RW	14	Natasja Behan		(substituted off) 73'
OC	13	Eve Higgins
IC	12	Aoife Dalton
LW	11	Beibhinn Parsons
FH	10	Dannah O'Brien
SH	9	Molly Scuffil-McCabe		(substituted off) 45'
N8	8	Brittany Hogan
OF	7	Edel McMahon (cc)	(yellow card) 2' to 13'	(substituted off) 53'
BF	6	Grace Moore		(substituted off) 66'
RL	5	Sam Monaghan (cc)
LL	4	Dorothy Wall		(substituted off) 77'
TP	3	Christy Haney		(substituted off) 73'
HK	2	Neve Jones		(substituted off) 77'
LP	1	Linda Djougang	(yellow card) 40+1' to 53'
Replacements:
HK	16	Clara Nielson		(substituted on) 77'
PR	17	Niamh O'Dowd
PR	18	Sadhbh McGrath		(substituted on) 73'
LK	19	Eimear Corri		(substituted on) 77'
FL	20	Aoife Wafer		(substituted on) 53'
SH	21	Aoibheann Reilly		(substituted on) 45'
FH	22	Nicole Fowley		(substituted on) 66'
WG	23	Leah Tarpey		(substituted on) 73'
Coach:
(England) Scott Bemand

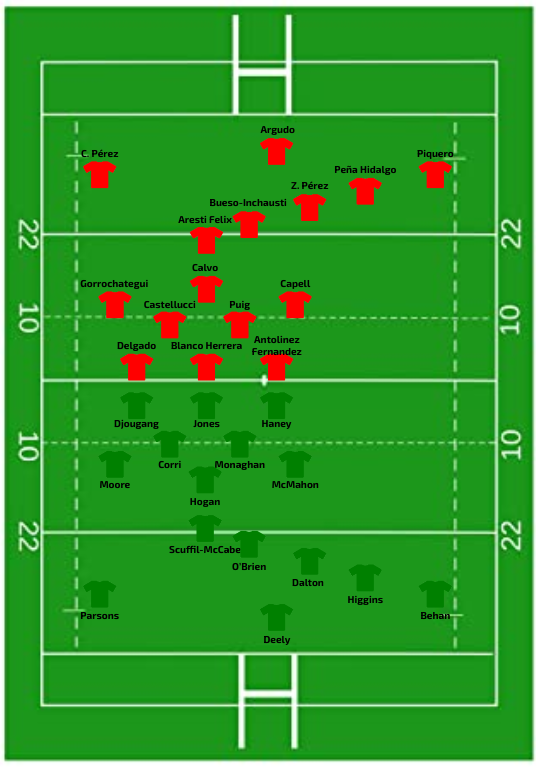

FB	15	Amalia Argudo
RW	14	Claudia Pérez	(substituted off) 71'
OC	13	Claudia Peña Hidalgo
IC	12	Zahía Pérez
LW	11	Clara Piquero	(substituted off) 71'
FH	10	Ines Bueso-Inchausti
SH	9	Maider Aresti Felix	(substituted off) 71'
N8	8	María Calvo
OF	7	Alba Capell
BF	6	Vico Gorrochategui
RL	5	Carmen Castellucci
LL	4	Anna Puig	(substituted off) 72'
TP	3	Laura Delgado	(substituted off) 54'
HK	2	Cristina Blanco Herrera (c)	(substituted off) 74'
LP	1	Ines Antolinez Fernandez	(substituted off) 54'
Replacements:
HK	16	Maria Roman Mallen	(substituted on) 74'
PR	17	Maria Del Castillo	(substituted on) 54'
PR	18	Sidorella Bracic Rodriguez	(substituted on) 54'
LK	19	Beatriz Rivera
FL	20	Nadina Cisa	(substituted on) 72'
SH	21	Julia Castro	(substituted on) 71'
FH	22	Alba Vinuesa	(substituted on) 71'
FB	23	Tecla Masoko Bueriberi	(substituted on) 71'
Coach:
(Spain) Juan González Marruecos

Player of the Match:
Dannah O'Brien (Ireland)

Assistant referees:
Ella Goldsmith (Australia)
Sunny Lee (Hong Kong)
Television match official:
Matteo Liperini (Italy)

Notes:

- In order to win the title, Ireland were required to avoid the defeat by any margin. Spain meanwhile had to win to be any margin. As Ireland won, they claimed their first WXV 3 title, their first major tournament win since the 2015 Six Nations.

== Statistics ==
=== WXV 1 ===
==== Top points scorers ====
Pos	Name	Team	Pts
1	Sophie de Goede	Canada	28
2	Lark Atkin-Davies	England	25
3	Holly Aitchison	England	24
4	Morgane Bourgeois	France	20
4	Ruby Tui	New Zealand	20
6	Renee Holmes	New Zealand	17
7	Asoiva Karpani	Australia	15
7	Mererangi Paul	New Zealand	15
7	Katelyn Vaha'akolo	New Zealand	15
10	Carys Dallinger	Australia	14

==== Top try scorers ====
Pos	Name	Team	Tries
1	Lark Atkin-Davies	England	5
2	Ruby Tui	New Zealand	4
3	Asoiva Karpani	Australia	3
3	Mererangi Paul	New Zealand	3
3	Katelyn Vaha'akolo	New Zealand	3
6	Jess Breach	England	2
6	Marlie Packer	England	2
6	Émilie Boulard	France	2
6	Lucy Jenkins	New Zealand	2
6	Emily Tuttosi	Canada	2
6	Carys Phillips	Wales	2

=== WXV 2 ===
==== Top points scorers ====
Pos	Name	Team	Pts
1	Libbie Janse van Rensburg	South Africa	38
2	Aura Muzzo	Italy	15
2	Lana Skeldon	Scotland	15
4	Ayasa Otsuka	Japan	14
5	Michela Sillari	Italy	13
6	Beatrice Capomaggi	Italy	10
6	Gabby Cantorna	United States	10
8	Alyssa D'Incà	Italy	10
8	Vittoria Ostuni Minuzzi	Italy	10
8	Misaki Matsumura	Japan	10
8	Iroha Nagata	Japan	10
8	Karla Wright-Akeli	Samoa	10
8	Emma Orr	Scotland	10

==== Top try scorers ====
Pos	Name	Team	Tries
1	Aura Muzzo	Italy	3
1	Lana Skeldon	Scotland	3
1	Libbie Janse van Rensburg	South Africa	3
4	Alyssa D'Incà	Italy	2
4	Vittoria Ostuni Minuzzi	Italy	2
4	Misaki Matsumura	Japan	2
4	Iroha Nagata	Japan	2
4	Karla Wright-Akeli	Samoa	2
4	Emma Orr	Scotland	2
10	40 players		1

=== WXV 3 ===
==== Top points scorers ====
Pos	Name	Team	Pts
1	Luisa Tisolo	Fiji	55
2	Beibhinn Parsons	Ireland	30
3	Dannah O'Brien	Ireland	27
4	Amalia Argudo	Spain	26
5	Adita Milinia	Fiji	20
5	Merewairita Neivosa	Fiji	20
5	Eve Higgins	Ireland	20
5	Claudia Peña Hidalgo	Spain	20
9	Vani Arei	Fiji	15
9	Atelaite Ralivanawa	Fiji	15
9	Neve Jones	Ireland	15
9	Grace Moore	Ireland	15

==== Top try scorers ====
Pos	Name	Team	Tries
1	Beibhinn Parsons	Ireland	6
2	Eve Higgins	Ireland	4
2	Adita Milinia	Fiji	4
2	Merewairita Neivosa	Fiji	4
2	Claudia Peña Hidalgo	Spain	4
6	Vani Arei	Fiji	3
6	Atelaite Ralivanawa	Fiji	3
6	Luisa Tisolo	Fiji	3
6	Neve Jones	Ireland	3
6	Grace Moore	Ireland	3

== Broadcasting rights ==
Territory	Rights holder	Ref.
Australia	Stan (WXV 1); RugbyPass TV (WXV 2 & 3)	
Canada	TSN (WXV 1); RugbyPass TV (WXV 2 & 3)	
France	TF1 (France fixtures); RugbyPass TV (WXV 2 & 3)	
Italy; San Marino; Vatican	Sky Sport (Matches Not Confirmed)	
MENA	Starzplay (Matches Not Confirmed)	
Netherlands	Ziggo (Matches Not Confirmed)	
New Zealand	Sky (WXV 1 & 2); RugbyPass TV (WXV 3)	
Portugal	Sport TV (Matches Not Confirmed)	
South Africa; SSA	SuperSport (WXV 2); RugbyPass TV (WXV 1 & 3)	
SE Asia	beIN (All fixtures)	
United Kingdom	ITVX (England & Wales fixtures); S4C (Wales fixtures); RugbyPass TV (All except England and Wales fixtures)	
All Other	RugbyPass TV	
