= Unathi Mali =

- Born: 3 December 1989 (age 36)
- Height: 1.72 m (5 ft 8 in)
- Weight: 72 kg (159 lb)

Rugby union career
International career
Years	Team	Apps	(Points)
2023	South Africa	1	(5)
National sevens team
Years	Team		Comps
	South Africa		23 (15)

Unathi Elis Mali (born 3 December 1989) is a South African rugby union and sevens player.

== Biography ==
Mali competed for South Africa at the 2018 Commonwealth Games in Gold Coast, Queensland, Australia. She was named in South Africa's squad for the 2022 Commonwealth Games in Birmingham where they finished in seventh place.

Mali was selected again to represent South Africa at the 2022 Rugby World Cup Sevens in Cape Town. She featured for the South African fifteens team at the inaugural 2023 WXV 2 tournament in Stellenbosch.
