= Hinata Komaki =

Japan international rugby union player

- Born: 9 May 2001 (age 25)
- Height: 1.66 m (5 ft 5 in)
- Weight: 75 kg (165 lb)

Rugby union career
- Position: Prop
Senior career
Years	Team	Apps	(Points)
	Tokyo Sankyu Phoenix		(0)
Super Rugby
Years	Team	Apps	(Points)
2023	Melbourne Rebels	0	(0)
2024	Western Force	0	(0)
International career
Years	Team	Apps	(Points)
2021–	Japan	21	(15)

Hinata Komaki (born 9 May 2001) is a Japanese rugby union player. She plays Prop internationally for the Japan women's national rugby union team. She competed at the delayed 2021 Rugby World Cup in New Zealand.

== Personal life ==
Komaki is completing her studies at the Nippon Sport Science University in Japan.

== Rugby career ==
Komaki was part of Japan’s 2021 Rugby World Cup squad, she featured in two games in the reserve.

Komaki was in the starting line-up when Japan took on Kazakhstan in the final of the 2023 Asia Rugby Women's Championship in Almaty. She was later named in Japan's squad for the inaugural 2023 WXV 2 tournament that was held in South Africa. She came off the bench in her sides final match against Scotland.

In 2024, she signed with the Western Force as part of the club's partnership with Tokyo Sankyu Phoenix. She made her debut for the Force against the Reds in their round two clash. She was named in the starting fifteen for the Force's game against the NSW Waratahs in round four. She previously played for the Melbourne Rebels in the Super W competition.

She was named in the Sakura fifteens squad for their tour to the United States in April 2025. On 28 July 2025, she was named in the Japanese side to the Women's Rugby World Cup in England.
