= Sosoli Talawadua =

New Zealand rugby union player

- Born: 30 January 1989 (age 37) Whanganui
- Height: 1.62 m (5 ft 4 in)
- Weight: 89 kg (196 lb)

Rugby union career
- Position: Prop
Provincial / State sides
Years	Team	Apps	(Points)
2013–2018	Waikato	33	(20)
2019–2024	Manawatū Cyclones	30	(15)
Super Rugby
Years	Team	Apps	(Points)
2023	Hurricanes Poua	5	(0)
International career
Years	Team	Apps	(Points)
2016–2017	New Zealand	8	(5)
2023	Samoa	3	(0)
Medal record
Women's rugby union
Representing New Zealand
Women's Rugby World Cup
Gold medal – first place	2017 Ireland	Team competition

Sosoli Talawadua (born 30 June 1989) is a New Zealand rugby union player. She was part of the Black Ferns champion 2017 Rugby World Cup squad in Ireland. She also plays for Hurricanes Poua in the Super Rugby Aupiki competition.

== Rugby career ==
Talawadua debuted for the Black Ferns on 27 November 2016 against Ireland at Dublin. She was part of the Black Ferns champion 2017 Rugby World Cup side.

Talawadua returned to Whanganui after representing Waikato for six seasons in the Farah Palmer Cup.

In 2019, She was named player of the year for the Manawatū Cyclones. In 2020, She worked part-time as the women’s and secondary schools’ rugby development officer for the Whanganui Rugby Union.

In December 2022, Talawadua was confirmed as one of three final signings for Hurricanes Poua for the 2023 Super Rugby Aupiki season.

=== 2023 ===
Talawadua was named in the Manusina Samoa squad for the inaugural WXV 2 tournament in Cape Town, South Africa.
