= Judith Okumu =

Kenyan rugby sevens player

- Born: 12 July 1998 (age 28)
- Height: 1.55 m (5 ft 1 in)
- Weight: 54 kg (119 lb)

Rugby union career
International career
Years	Team	Apps	(Points)
2023	Kenya		(0)
National sevens team
Years	Team		Comps
2020	Kenya		

Judith Okumu (born 12 July 1998) is a Kenyan rugby sevens player. She competed in the women's tournament at the 2020 Summer Olympics.

Okumu was named in Kenya's fifteens squad on 3 October 2023 for the inaugural WXV 3 tournament that will be held in Dubai.
