= Merewai Cumu =

Fijian rugby sevens player

- Born: August 31, 1997 (age 29)
- Height: 1.74 m (5 ft 9 in)
- Weight: 73 kg (161 lb; 11 st 7 lb)

Rugby union career
National sevens team
Years	Team	Comps
- Fiji

Merewai Cumu (born 31 August 1997) is a Fijian rugby sevens player. She competed for Fiji in rugby sevens at the 2016 Summer Olympics in Rio.

== Rugby career ==
Cumu represented Fiji in sevens at the 2015 Commonwealth Youth Games in Samoa. She was a member of the Fiji women's national rugby sevens team at the 2016 Summer Olympics.

On 20 May 2023, she was named in the Fijiana fifteens 23-member squad that faced the Wallaroos at the Allianz Stadium.
