= 2025 Pacific Four Series squads =

The 2025 Pacific Four Series is the 5th edition of the Pacific Four Series, an annual rugby union competition sanctioned by World Rugby and contested by the national teams of Australia, Canada, New Zealand and the United States. Canada have won two titles — 2021 and 2024, and are the defending champions.

Note: Number of caps are indicated as of the first match of the tournament (2 May 2025).

== Australia ==
The Wallaroos squad for the series.

Head coach: (England) Joanne Yapp

Player	Position	Date of birth (age)	Caps	Club/province
Katalina Amosa	Hooker	26 May 2002 (aged 22)	1	(Australia) ACT Brumbies
Ashley Marsters	Hooker	2 November 1993 (aged 31)	35	(Australia) Western Force
Tania Naden	Hooker	20 February 1992 (aged 33)	20	(Australia) ACT Brumbies
Adiana Talakai	Hooker	24 February 1999 (aged 26)	16	(Australia) NSW Waratahs
Bree-Anna Browne	Prop	29 March 1997 (aged 28)	9	(Australia) Queensland Reds
Martha Fua	Prop	27 April 2002 (aged 23)	1	(Australia) ACT Brumbies
Eva Karpani	Prop	18 June 1996 (aged 28)	32	(Australia) NSW Waratahs
Bridie O'Gorman	Prop	8 December 1998 (aged 26)	27	(Australia) NSW Waratahs
Faliki Pohiva	Prop	16 April 2002 (aged 23)	1	(Australia) NSW Waratahs
Annabelle Codey	Lock	3 February 1997 (aged 28)	5	(Australia) NSW Waratahs
Ashley Fernandez	Lock	24 October 2002 (aged 22)	1	(Australia) ACT Brumbies
Kaitlan Leaney	Lock	10 October 2000 (aged 24)	25	(Australia) NSW Waratahs
Michaela Leonard	Lock	6 March 1995 (aged 30)	33	(Australia) Western Force
Tiarah Minns	Lock	6 April 2001 (aged 24)	2	(Australia) Melbourne Rebels
Ruby Anderson	Back row	8 May 2007 (aged 17)	uncapped	(Australia) NSW Waratahs
Emily Chancellor	Back row	20 August 1991 (aged 33)	24	(Australia) NSW Waratahs
Lydia Kavoa	Back row	8 November 1993 (aged 31)	5	(Australia) ACT Brumbies
Siokapesi Palu (c)	Back row	15 October 1996 (aged 28)	17	(Australia) ACT Brumbies
Tabua Tuinakauvadra	Back row	27 December 2002 (aged 22)	12	(Australia) ACT Brumbies
Layne Morgan	Scrum-half	20 April 1999 (aged 26)	30	(Australia) Queensland Reds
Natalie Wright	Scrum-half	8 September 2002 (aged 22)	4	(Australia) Queensland Reds
Waiaria Ellis	Fly-half	11 September 2007 (aged 17)	uncapped	(Australia) NSW Waratahs
Tia Hinds	Fly-half	5 November 2002 (aged 22)	1	(Australia) ACT Brumbies
Arabella McKenzie	Fly-half	1 March 1999 (aged 26)	28	(Australia) NSW Waratahs
Faitala Moleka	Fly-half	29 January 2005 (aged 20)	17	(Australia) ACT Brumbies
Manua Moleka	Fly-half	10 January 2007 (aged 18)	uncapped	(Australia) ACT Brumbies
Georgina Friedrichs	Centre	14 April 1995 (aged 30)	29	(Australia) NSW Waratahs
Trilleen Pomare	Centre	5 April 1993 (aged 32)	34	(Australia) Western Force
Cecilia Smith	Centre	13 March 1994 (aged 31)	20	(Australia) Western Force
Biola Dawa	Wing	5 November 2000 (aged 24)	3	(Australia) ACT Brumbies
Desiree Miller	Wing	13 January 2002 (aged 23)	13	(Australia) NSW Waratahs
Caitlin Urwin	Wing		uncapped	(Australia) Queensland Reds
Charlotte Caslick	Fullback	9 March 1995 (aged 30)	1	(Australia) Queensland Reds
Lori Cramer	Fullback	8 March 1993 (aged 32)	27	(Australia) Queensland Reds

== Canada ==
Canada's 36-player squad was announced on 4 April 2025.

Head coach: (France) Kévin Rouet

Player	Position	Date of birth (age)	Caps	Club/province
Gillian Boag	Hooker	19 February 1995 (aged 30)	25	(England) Gloucester-Hartpury
Holly Phillips	Hooker	24 December 1999 (aged 25)		(England) Bristol Bears
Emily Tuttosi	Hooker	21 September 1995 (aged 29)	31	(England) Exeter Chiefs
Alysia Comtois	Prop			(Canada) University of Ottawa
Alex Ellis	Prop	1 August 1995 (aged 29)	28	(France) Stade Villeneuvois LM
McKinley Hunt	Prop	5 January 1997 (aged 28)	27	(England) Saracens
Brittany Kassil	Prop	14 March 1991 (aged 34)	43	(Canada) Guelph Goats
DaLeaka Menin	Prop	16 June 1995 (aged 29)	57	(England) Exeter Chiefs
Mikiela Nelson	Prop	27 November 1997 (aged 27)	6	(England) Exeter Chiefs
Cassandra Tuffnail	Prop	12 April 1998 (aged 27)		(England) Trailfinders
Rori Wood	Prop	30 January 2000 (aged 25)	1	(England) Trailfinders
Tyson Beukeboom	Second row	10 March 1991 (aged 34)	70	(England) Trailfinders
Julia Omokhuale	Second row	9 July 2001 (aged 23)	4	(England) Leicester Tigers
Rachel Smith	Second row	7 April 2001 (aged 24)	0	(Canada) University of British Columbia
Fabiola Forteza	Back row	4 August 1995 (aged 29)	29	(France) Stade Bordelais
Courtney O'Donnell	Back row	25 April 1999 (aged 26)	40	(England) Loughborough Lightning
Laetitia Royer	Back row	9 February 1991 (aged 34)	13	(France) ASM Romagnat
Gabby Senft	Back row	13 June 1997 (aged 27)	27	(England) Saracens
Karen Paquin	Forward	3 August 1987 (aged 37)	39	(Canada) Club de rugby de Quebec
Olivia Apps	Scrum-half	1 December 1998 (aged 26)	13	(Canada) Lindsay RFC
Justine Blatt-Janmaat	Scrum-half			(Canada) Westshore RFC / Valley Rugby Union
Justine Pelletier	Scrum-half	27 February 1996 (aged 29)	30	(France) Stade Bordelais
Claire Gallagher	Fly-half	20 April 2000 (aged 25)	12	(England) Leicester Tigers
Sarah-Maude Lachance	Fly-half	7 December 1998 (aged 26)	9	(France) Stade Bordelais
Taylor Perry	Fly-half	23 July 2000 (aged 24)	14	(England) Exeter Chiefs
Alex Tessier	Fly-half	3 September 1993 (aged 31)	53	(England) Exeter Chiefs
Alysha Corrigan	Centre	25 January 1997 (aged 28)	17	(England) Saracens
Caroline Crossley	Centre	19 April 1998 (aged 27)	2	(Canada) Castaway Wanderers RFC
Shoshanah Seumanutafa	Centre	17 September 1999 (aged 25)	12	(New Zealand) Chiefs Manawa
Fancy Bermudez	Wing	27 May 2002 (aged 22)	13	(England) Saracens
Paige Farries	Wing	12 August 1994 (aged 30)	38	(England) Saracens
Asia Hogan-Rochester	Wing	20 April 1999 (aged 26)	2	(Canada) Toronto Nomads / Westshore RFC
Krissy Scurfield	Wing	15 June 2003 (aged 21)	3	(England) Loughborough Lightning
Florence Symonds	Wing	20 May 2002 (aged 22)		(Canada) University of British Columbia
Mahalia Robinson	Back			(Canada) Town of Mount Royal RFC
Julia Schell	Back	13 July 1997 (aged 27)	19	(England) Trailfinders

== New Zealand ==
New Zealand's 33-player squad was announced on 1 May 2025.

Head coach: (New Zealand) Allan Bunting

Player	Position	Date of birth (age)	Caps	Club/province
Vici-Rose Green	Hooker	4 August 2002 (aged 22)	0	(New Zealand) Chiefs Manawa
Atlanta Lolohea	Hooker	16 April 2003 (aged 22)	5	(New Zealand) Blues
Georgia Ponsonby	Hooker	14 December 1999 (aged 25)	27	(New Zealand) Matatū
Kate Henwood	Prop	28 January 1989 (aged 36)	10	(New Zealand) Chiefs Manawa
Tanya Kalounivale	Prop	20 January 1999 (aged 26)	18	(New Zealand) Chiefs Manawa
Veisinia Mahutariki-Fakalelu	Prop	24 November 2024 (aged 0)	0	(New Zealand) Chiefs Manawa
Amy Rule	Prop	15 July 2000 (aged 24)	27	(New Zealand) Matatū
Awhina Tangen-Wainohu	Prop	16 December 1997 (aged 27)	4	(New Zealand) Blues
Chryss Viliko	Prop	25 December 2000 (aged 24)	8	(New Zealand) Blues
Alana Bremner	Second row	10 February 1997 (aged 28)	25	(New Zealand) Matatū
Dhys Faleafaga	Second row	17 October 2000 (aged 24)	2	(New Zealand) Black Ferns Sevens
Maia Roos	Second row	27 July 2001 (aged 23)	29	(New Zealand) Blues
Maama Vaipulu	Second row	26 November 2002 (aged 22)	5	(New Zealand) Blues
Kaipo Olsen-Baker	Number 8	1 May 2002 (aged 23)	9	(New Zealand) Matatū
Liana Mikaele-Tu'u	Forward	2 March 2002 (aged 23)	26	(New Zealand) Blues
Jorja Miller	Forward	8 February 2004 (aged 21)	0	(New Zealand) Black Ferns Sevens
Layla Sae	Forward	22 October 2000 (aged 24)	11	(New Zealand) Hurricanes Poua
Kennedy Tukuafu	Forward	1 October 1996 (aged 28)	27	(New Zealand) Chiefs Manawa
Iritana Hohaia	Scrum-half	1 March 2000 (aged 25)	14	(New Zealand) Hurricanes Poua
Maia Joseph	Scrum-half	20 May 2002 (aged 22)	8	(New Zealand) Matatū
Risi Pouri-Lane	Scrum-half	28 May 2000 (aged 24)	0	(New Zealand) Black Ferns Sevens
Ruahei Demant	Fly-half	21 April 1995 (aged 30)	41	(New Zealand) Blues
Hannah King	Fly-half	13 January 2004 (aged 21)	7	(New Zealand) Matatū
Sylvia Brunt	Centre	1 January 2004 (aged 21)	21	(New Zealand) Blues
Amy du Plessis	Centre	7 July 1999 (aged 25)	19	(New Zealand) Matatū
Theresa Setefano	Centre	25 February 1995 (aged 30)	18	(New Zealand) Black Ferns Sevens
Stacey Waaka	Centre	3 November 1995 (aged 29)	25	(New Zealand) Black Ferns Sevens
Ayesha Leti-I'iga	Wing	3 January 1999 (aged 26)	24	(New Zealand) Hurricanes Poua
Mererangi Paul	Wing	29 October 1998 (aged 26)	12	(New Zealand) Chiefs Manawa
Katelyn Vaha'akolo	Wing	18 April 2000 (aged 25)	14	(New Zealand) Blues
Portia Woodman-Wickliffe	Wing	12 July 1991 (aged 33)	24	(New Zealand) Blues
Braxton Sorensen-McGee	Fullback	26 October 2006 (aged 18)	0	(New Zealand) Blues
Kelly Brazier	Back	28 October 1989 (aged 35)	42	(New Zealand) Chiefs Manawa

== United States ==
On 27 March, Head coach, Sione Fukofuka, announced the Eagles roster for the series.

Player	Position	Date of birth (age)	Caps	Club/province
Kathryn Treder	Hooker	March 17, 1996 (aged 29)	26	(England) Loughborough Lightning
Paige Stathopoulos	Hooker	August 23, 1993 (aged 31)	14	(England) Ealing Trailfinders / (United States) Boston Banshees
Saher Hamdan	Hooker	December 19, 1999 (aged 25)		(United States) Denver Onyx
Hope Rogers	Prop	January 7, 1993 (aged 32)	51	(England) Exeter Chiefs
Maya Learned	Prop	January 1, 1996 (aged 29)	16	(United States) Denver Onyx
Charli Jacoby	Prop	October 9, 1989 (aged 35)	33	(England) Exeter Chiefs / (Australia) Queensland Reds
Keia Mae Sagapolu	Prop	May 12, 2000 (aged 24)	15	(England) Leicester Tigers / (Australia) ACT Brumbies
Catie Benson	Prop	February 10, 1992 (aged 33)	45	(England) Sale Sharks / (United States) Boston Banshees
Alivia Leatherman	Prop	August 9, 2002 (aged 22)	5	(England) Ealing Trailfinders / (United States) Twin Cities Gemini
Hallie Taufo'ou	Lock	May 26, 1994 (aged 30)	23	(England) Loughborough Lightning / (United States) Denver Onyx
Erica Jarrell	Lock	February 25, 1999 (aged 26)	14	(England) Sale Sharks
Rachel Ehrecke	Lock	December 6, 1999 (aged 25)	19	(United States) Denver Onyx
Emerson Allen	Lock	May 1, 1999 (aged 26)		(United States) Twin Cities Gemini
Tahlia Brody	Back row	September 10, 1994 (aged 30)	11	(England) Leicester Tigers / (United States) Denver Onyx
Rachel Johnson	Back row	February 5, 1991 (aged 34)	33	(England) Exeter Chiefs / (United States) Denver Onyx
Freda Tafuna	Back row	August 31, 2003 (aged 21)	10	(United States) Lindenwood University
Kate Zackary (c)	Back row	July 26, 1989 (aged 35)	41	(England) Ealing Trailfinders
Georgie Perris-Redding	Back row	January 10, 1997 (aged 28)	14	(England) Sale Sharks
Kapoina Bailey	Back row		1	(United States) Denver Onyx
Olivia Ortiz	Scrum-half	October 23, 1997 (aged 27)	22	(England) Sale Sharks
Cassidy Bargell	Scrum-half	December 28, 1999 (aged 25)	5	(United States) Boston Banshees
Taina Tukuafu	Scrum-half	August 18, 2001 (aged 23)	13	(United States) Bay Breakers
McKenzie Hawkins	Fly-half	January 8, 1997 (aged 28)	21	(United States) Denver Onyx
Kristin Bitter	Fly-half		4	(United States) Denver Onyx
Nicole Heavirland	Fly-half	February 25, 1995 (aged 30)	10	(United States) Boston Banshees / USA Sevens
Alev Kelter	Centre	March 21, 1991 (aged 34)	27	(England) Loughborough Lightning / (United States) Bay Breakers
Emily Henrich	Centre	November 10, 1999 (aged 25)	21	(England) Leicester Tigers / (United States) Boston Banshees
Ilona Maher	Centre	August 12, 1996 (aged 28)	2	(England) Bristol Bears / (United States) USA Sevens
Joanne Fa'avesi	Centre	February 5, 1992 (aged 33)	6	
Gabby Cantorna	Centre	August 2, 1995 (aged 29)	32	(England) Exeter Chiefs
Erica Coulibaly	Wing		1	(United States) Denver Onyx
Cheta Emba	Wing	July 16, 1993 (aged 31)	13	(United States) Boston Banshees
Lotte Sharp	Wing	January 13, 1995 (aged 30)	16	(England) Saracens
Bulou Mataitoga	Fullback	April 8, 1994 (aged 31)	22	(England) Loughborough Lightning / (United States) Bay Breakers
Sariah Ibarra	Fullback	September 19, 2005 (aged 19)	2	(United States) USA Sevens
Tess Feury	Utility back	March 15, 1996 (aged 29)	31	(England) Leicester Tigers / (United States) New York Exiles
