= 2024 WXV squads =

Women's international rugby union

The 2024 WXV, Women's international rugby union group tournament, was held in Canada, South Africa, and the United Arab Emirates from 27 September to 13 October 2024. Eighteen teams qualified across three divisions.

Note: The age and number of caps listed for each player is as of 27 September 2024, the first day of the tournament.

== Overview ==
Below is a table that lists all the head coaches and captains of each nation.

Team	Coach(es)	Captain
Australia	(England) Joanne Yapp	Michaela Leonard
Canada	(Canada) Kévin Rouet	Tyson Beukeboom
England	(New Zealand) John Mitchell	Marlie Packer
Fiji	(Fiji) Mosese Rauluni	Karalaini Naisewa
France	(France) Gaëlle Mignot (France) David Ortiz	Manaé Feleu
Hong Kong China	(New Zealand) Andrew Douglas	Pun Wai-yan
Ireland	(England) Scott Bemand	Edel McMahon
Italy	(Italy) Giovanni Raineri	Elisa Giordano
Japan	(Canada) Lesley McKenzie	Iroha Nagata
Madagascar	(Madagascar) Alain Randriamihaja	Fenitra Razafindramanga
Netherlands	(Netherlands) Sylke Haverkorn	Linde van der Velden
New Zealand	(New Zealand) Allan Bunting	Kennedy Simon; Ruahei Demant
Samoa	(Samoa) Ramsey Tomokino	Sui Pauaraisa
Scotland	(Scotland) Bryan Easson	Rachel Malcolm
South Africa	(South Africa) Swys de Bruin	Nolusindiso Booi
Spain	(Spain) Juan González Marruecos	Laura Delgado
United States	(Australia) Sione Fukofuka	Kate Zackary
Wales	(Wales) Ioan Cunningham	Hannah Jones

== WXV 1 ==
=== Canada ===
Canada announced their 30-player squad on 19 September.

Head coach: (Canada) Kévin Rouet

Player	Position	Date of birth (age)	Caps	Club/province
Alexandria Ellis	Prop	1 August 1995 (aged 29)	25	(France) Stade Français
Brittany Kassil	Prop	14 March 1991 (aged 33)	40	(Canada) Guelph Goats
Caroline Crossley	Forward	19 April 1998 (aged 26)	0	(Canada) Castaway Wanderers
Courtney Holtkamp	Back row	25 April 1999 (aged 25)	37	(Canada) Red Deer Titans Rugby
DaLeaka Menin	Prop	16 June 1995 (aged 29)	55	(England) Exeter Chiefs
Emily Tuttosi	Hooker	21 September 1995 (aged 29)	28	(England) Exeter Chiefs
Fabiola Forteza	Back row	4 August 1995 (aged 29)	26	(France) Stade Bordelais
Gabrielle Senft	Back row	13 June 1997 (aged 27)	24	(England) Saracens
Gillian Boag	Hooker	19 February 1995 (aged 29)	25	(England) Gloucester-Hartpury
Julia Omokhuale	Back row	9 July 2001 (aged 23)	2	(England) Leicester Tigers
Karen Paquin	Back row	3 August 1987 (aged 37)	38	(Canada) Club de rugby de Quebec
Laetitia Royer	Back row	9 February 1991 (aged 33)	10	(France) ASM Romagnat
McKinley Hunt	Lock	5 January 1997 (aged 27)	24	(England) Saracens
Pamphinette Buisa	Back row	28 December 1996 (aged 27)	12	(Canada) Ottawa Irish
Rori Wood	Lock	30 January 2000 (aged 24)	0	(New Zealand) College Rifles RFC
Sara Cline	Hooker	21 May 1997 (aged 27)	6	(Canada) Leprechaun Tigers
Tyson Beukeboom	Lock	10 March 1991 (aged 33)	67	(England) Trailfinders
Alexandra Tessier	Fly-half	3 September 1993 (aged 31)	50	(England) Exeter Chiefs
Alysha Corrigan	Back	25 January 1997 (aged 27)	14	Canada Sevens
Asia Hogan-Rochester	Back	20 April 1999 (aged 25)	0	(Canada) Toronto Nomands
Claire Gallagher	Fly-half	20 April 2000 (aged 24)	9	(England) Leicester Tigers
Fancy Bermudez	Centre	27 May 2002 (aged 22)	10	(England) Saracens
Julia Schell	Back	13 July 1996 (aged 28)	16	(England) Trailfinders
Justine Pelletier	Scrum-half	27 February 1996 (aged 28)	27	(France) Stade Bordelais
Mahalia Robinson	Fullback	2 September 1999 (aged 25)	2	(Canada) Town of Mount Royal RFC
Olivia Apps	Scrum-half	1 December 1998 (aged 25)	10	(Canada) Lindsay RFC
Paige Farries	Wing	12 August 1994 (aged 30)	36	(England) Saracens
Sara Kaljuvee	Back	7 February 1993 (aged 31)	21	(Canada) Toronto Scottish / Westshore RFC
Shoshanah Seumanutafa	Back	17 September 1999 (aged 25)	9	(New Zealand) Counties Manukau
Taylor Perry	Fly-half	23 July 2000 (aged 24)	13	(England) Exeter Chiefs

=== England ===
England announced their final squad on 18 September 2024.

Head coach: (New Zealand) John Mitchell

Player	Position	Date of birth (age)	Caps	Club/province
Zoe Aldcroft	Lock	19 November 1996 (aged 27)	55	(England) Gloucester-Hartpury
Lark Atkin-Davies	Hooker	3 March 1995 (aged 29)	59	(England) Bristol Bears
Sarah Bern	Prop	10 July 1997 (aged 27)	63	(England) Bristol Bears
Hannah Botterman	Prop	8 June 1999 (aged 25)	49	(England) Bristol Bears
Georgia Brock	Back row	19 April 1991 (aged 33)	1	(England) Gloucester-Hartpury
Mackenzie Carson	Prop	28 November 1998 (aged 25)	18	(England) Gloucester-Hartpury
Amy Cokayne	Hooker	11 July 1996 (aged 28)	76	(England) Leicester Tigers
Kelsey Clifford	Prop	11 December 2001 (aged 22)	8	(England) Saracens
Maddie Feaunati	Back row	18 May 2002 (aged 22)	7	(England) Exeter Chiefs
Rosie Galligan	Lock	30 April 1998 (aged 26)	16	(England) Saracens
Lilli Ives Campion	Lock	10 October 2003 (aged 20)	1	(England) Loughborough Lightning
Alex Matthews	Back row	3 August 1993 (aged 31)	69	(England) Gloucester-Hartpury
Maud Muir	Prop	12 July 2001 (aged 23)	32	(England) Gloucester-Hartpury
Marlie Packer	Back row	2 October 1989 (aged 34)	106	(England) Saracens
Connie Powell	Hooker	13 July 2000 (aged 24)	19	(England) Harlequins
Morwenna Talling	Back row	29 September 2002 (aged 21)	15	(England) Sale Sharks
Abbie Ward	Lock	27 March 1993 (aged 31)	66	(England) Bristol Bears
Holly Aitchison	Fly-half	13 September 1997 (aged 27)	32	(England) Bristol Bears
Jess Breach	Wing	4 November 1997 (aged 26)	40	(England) Saracens
Abigail Dow	Wing	29 September 1997 (aged 26)	47	(England) Trailfinders
Zoe Harrison	Fly-half	14 April 1998 (aged 26)	51	(England) Saracens
Tatyana Heard	Centre	14 January 1995 (aged 29)	24	(England) Gloucester-Hartpury
Natasha Hunt	Scrum-half	21 March 1989 (aged 35)	74	(England) Gloucester-Hartpury
Ellie Kildunne	Fullback	8 September 1999 (aged 25)	45	(England) Harlequins
Phoebe Murray	Centre	1 March 1999 (aged 25)	0	(England) Bristol Bears
Lucy Packer	Scrum-half	2 February 2000 (aged 24)	23	(England) Harlequins
Helena Rowland	Centre	19 September 1999 (aged 25)	31	(England) Loughborough Lightning
Emily Scarratt	Centre	8 February 1990 (aged 34)	113	(England) Loughborough Lightning
Bo Westcombe-Evans	Wing	18 August 2002 (aged 22)	0	(England) Loughborough Lightning
Ella Wyrwas	Scrum-half	7 March 1999 (aged 25)	6	(England) Saracens

=== France ===
France announced their final squad on 2 September 2024.

Head coach: (France) Gaëlle Mignot (France) David Ortiz

Player	Position	Date of birth (age)	Caps	Club/province
Rose Bernadou	Prop	3 March 2000 (aged 24)	14	(France) Montpellier HR
Axelle Berthoumieu	Flanker	9 July 2000 (aged 24)	14	(France) Blagnac Rugby Féminin
Manon Bigot	Hooker	6 June 1990 (aged 34)	7	(France) Blagnac Rugby Féminin
Maïlys Borak	Prop	12 January 2004 (aged 20)		(France) Stade Bordelais
Yllana Brosseau	Prop	5 September 2000 (aged 24)	13	(France) Stade Bordelais
Charlotte Escudero	Back row	26 December 2000 (aged 23)	21	(France) Stade Toulousain
Madoussou Fall Raclot	Second row	17 March 1998 (aged 26)	31	(France) Stade Bordelais
Manaé Feleu	Second row	3 February 2000 (aged 24)	18	(France) FC Grenoble Amazones
Teani Feleu	Flanker	19 December 2002 (aged 21)	4	(France) FC Grenoble Amazones
Émeline Gros	Number 8	19 August 1995 (aged 29)	34	(France) FC Grenoble Amazones
Hina Ikahehegi	Second row	29 April 2003 (aged 21)	1	(France) Stade Villeneuvois
Assia Khalfaoui	Prop	24 March 2001 (aged 23)	24	(France) Stade Bordelais
Romane Ménager	Number 8	26 July 1996 (aged 28)	63	(France) Montpellier HR
Ambre Mwayembe	Prop	1 March 2004 (aged 20)	11	(France) FC Grenoble Amazones
Séraphine Okemba	Prop	3 December 1995 (aged 28)	1	(France) Lyon OU Rugby
Élisa Riffonneau	Hooker	26 November 2003 (aged 20)	10	(France) FC Grenoble Amazones
Agathe Sochat	Hooker	21 May 1995 (aged 29)	53	(France) Stade Bordelais
Chloé Vauclin	Prop	7 May 2005 (aged 19)		(France) Stade Rennais
Cyrielle Banet	Wing	29 August 1994 (aged 30)	28	(France) Montpellier HR
Océane Bordes	Scrum-half	16 May 2002 (aged 22)		(France) Stade Toulousain
Émilie Boulard	Fullback	28 August 1999 (aged 25)	32	(France) Blagnac Rugby Féminin
Pauline Bourdon Sansus	Scrum-half	4 November 1995 (aged 28)	58	(France) Stade Toulousain
Alexandra Chambon	Scrum-half	2 August 2000 (aged 24)	23	(France) FC Grenoble Amazones
Chloé Jacquet	Centre	17 April 2002 (aged 22)	19	(France) Lyon OU Rugby
Nassira Konde	Centre	30 July 1999 (aged 25)	11	(France) Stade Bordelais
Mélissande Llorens	Wing	18 June 2002 (aged 22)	10	(France) Blagnac Rugby Féminin
Marine Ménager	Wing	26 July 1996 (aged 28)	49	(France) Montpellier HR
Lina Queyroi	Fly-half	18 May 2001 (aged 23)	14	(France) Stade Toulousain
Lina Tuy	Fly-half	10 September 2004 (aged 20)	4	(France) ASM Romagnat
Gabrielle Vernier	Centre	12 June 1997 (aged 27)	46	(France) Blagnac Rugby Féminin

=== Ireland ===
Ireland announced their final squad on 17 September 2024.

Head coach: (England) Scott Bemand

Player	Position	Date of birth (age)	Caps	Club/province
Sophie Barrett	Prop	27 January 2004 (aged 20)	0	(Ireland) Railway Union RFC / Ulster
Ruth Campbell	Second row	27 June 2003 (aged 21)	1	(Ireland) Old Belvedere RFC / Leinster
Linda Djougang	Prop	17 May 1996 (aged 28)	38	(Ireland) Old Belvedere RFC / Leinster
Brittany Hogan	Back row	19 September 1998 (aged 26)	24	(Ireland) Old Belvedere RFC / Ulster
Neve Jones	Hooker	26 December 1998 (aged 25)	27	(England) Gloucester-Hartpury
Erin King	Back row	21 October 2003 (aged 20)	1	(Ireland) Old Belvedere RFC
Siobhán McCarthy	Prop	5 September 1995 (aged 29)	1	(England) Worcester Warriors / Munster
Sadhbh McGrath	Prop	30 August 2004 (aged 20)	13	(Ireland) Cooke RFC / Ulster
Edel McMahon	Back row	25 March 1994 (aged 30)	29	(England) Exeter Chiefs
Cliodhna Moloney	Hooker	31 May 1993 (aged 31)	35	(England) Exeter Chiefs
Grace Moore	Back row	21 May 1996 (aged 28)	15	(England) Trailfinders
Deirbhile Nic a Bháird	Number 8	22 September 1995 (aged 29)	9	(Ireland) Old Belvedere RFC / Munster
Niamh O'Dowd	Prop	21 April 2000 (aged 24)	8	(Ireland) Old Belvedere RFC / Leinster
Andrea Stock	Prop	9 August 1999 (aged 25)	0	(England) Trailfinders
Fiona Tuite	Second row	27 December 1996 (aged 27)	7	(Ireland) Old Belvedere RFC / Ulster
Aoife Wafer	Back row	25 March 2003 (aged 21)	8	(Ireland) Blackrock College RFC / Leinster
Dorothy Wall	Second row	4 May 2000 (aged 24)	29	(England) Exeter Chiefs / Munster
Enya Breen	Outside-half	23 April 1999 (aged 25)	22	(Ireland) Blackrock College RFC / Munster
Eimear Considine	Wing	8 May 1991 (aged 33)	27	(Ireland) UL Bohemian RFC / Munster
Aoife Dalton	Centre	3 May 2003 (aged 21)	15	(Ireland) Old Belvedere RFC / Leinster
Vicky Elmes Kinlan	Wing	21 February 2003 (aged 21)	1	(Ireland) Wicklow RFC / Munster
Caitríona Finn	??	4 June 2006 (aged 18)	0	(Ireland) UL Bohemian RFC / Munster
Stacey Flood	Outside-half	5 August 1996 (aged 28)	11	(Ireland) Railway Union RFC
Nicole Fowley	Outside-half	23 December 1992 (aged 31)	12	(Ireland) Galwegians RFC / Connacht
Katie Heffernan	Centre	8 September 1998 (aged 26)	0	(Ireland) Railway Union RFC / Leinster
Eve Higgins	Centre	23 June 1999 (aged 25)	18	(Ireland) Railway Union RFC
Emily Lane	Scrum-half	10 January 1999 (aged 25)	7	(Ireland) Blackrock College RFC
Amee-Leigh Murphy Crowe	Wing	26 April 1995 (aged 29)	10	(Ireland) Railway Union RFC / Munster
Molly Scuffil-McCabe	Scrum-half	15 March 1998 (aged 26)	17	(Ireland) Leinster
Dannah O'Brien	Outside-half	22 September 2003 (aged 21)	16	(Ireland) Old Belvedere RFC / Leinster

=== New Zealand ===
On 16 August, New Zealand named their 30–player squad for their End of Year tour and WXV1.

Head coach: (New Zealand) Allan Bunting

Player	Position	Date of birth (age)	Caps	Club/province
Luka Connor	Hooker	24 September 1996 (aged 27)	23	(New Zealand) Chiefs Manawa / Bay of Plenty
Georgia Ponsonby	Hooker	14 December 1999 (aged 24)	25	(New Zealand) Matatū / Canterbury
Atlanta Lolohea	Hooker	16 April 2003 (aged 21)	2	(New Zealand) Matatū / Canterbury
Kate Henwood	Prop	28 January 1989 (age 37)	6	(New Zealand) Chiefs Manawa / Bay of Plenty
Tanya Kalounivale	Prop	20 January 1999 (aged 25)	15	(New Zealand) Chiefs Manawa / Waikato
Phillipa Love	Prop	8 April 1990 (aged 34)	28	(New Zealand) Matatū / Canterbury
Marcelle Parkes	Prop	9 September 1997 (age 29)	6	(New Zealand) Matatū / Canterbury
Amy Rule	Prop	15 July 2000 (aged 23)	24	(New Zealand) Matatū / Canterbury
Chryss Viliko	Prop	25 December 2000 (aged 23)	7	(New Zealand) Blues / Auckland
Alana Bremner	Lock	10 February 1997 (aged 27)	22	(New Zealand) Matatū / Canterbury
Chelsea Bremner	Lock	11 April 1995 (aged 29)	19	(New Zealand) Chiefs Manawa / Canterbury
Maiakawanakaulani Roos	Lock	27 July 2001 (age 25)	26	(New Zealand) Blues / Auckland
Ma'ama Mo'onia Vaipulu	Lock	26 November 2002 (aged 21)	3	(New Zealand) Blues / Auckland
Kaipo Olsen-Baker	Loose forward	1 May 2002 (age 24)	7	(New Zealand) Matatū / Manawatū
Kennedy Simon (cc)	Loose forward	1 October 1996 (age 30)	24	(New Zealand) Chiefs Manawa / Waikato
Layla Sae	Loose forward	22 October 2000 (aged 23)	8	(New Zealand) Hurricanes Poua / Manawatū
Liana Mikaele-Tu'u	Loose forward	2 March 2002 (aged 22)	23	(New Zealand) Blues / Auckland
Lucy Jenkins	Loose forward	30 November 2000 (aged 23)	6	(New Zealand) Matatu / Canterbury
Iritana Hohaia	Scrum-half	1 March 2000 (aged 24)	11	(New Zealand) Hurricanes Poua / Taranaki
Maia Joseph	Scrum-half	20 May 2002 (age 24)	5	(New Zealand) Matatū / Otago
Ruahei Demant (cc)	Fly-half	21 April 1995 (aged 29)	38	(New Zealand) Blues / Auckland
Hannah King	Fly-half	13 January 2004 (aged 20)	4	(New Zealand) Hurricanes Poua / Canterbury
Sylvia Brunt	Centre	1 January 2004 (aged 20)	18	(New Zealand) Blues / Auckland
Amy du Plessis	Centre	7 July 1999 (aged 24)	18	(New Zealand) Matatū / Canterbury
Renee Holmes	Utility back	21 December 1999 (aged 24)	19	(New Zealand) Chiefs Manawa / Waikato
Ayesha Leti-I'iga	Utility back	3 January 1999 (age 27)	22	(New Zealand) Hurricanes Poua
Patricia Maliepo	Utility back	13 March 2003 (aged 21)	9	(New Zealand) Blues / Auckland
Mererangi Paul	Utility back	29 October 1998 (aged 25)	9	(New Zealand) Chiefs Manawa / Counties Manukau
Ruby Tui	Utility back	13 December 1991 (aged 32)	17	(New Zealand) Chiefs Manawa / Counties Manukau
Katelyn Vaha'akolo	Utility back	18 April 2000 (aged 24)	11	(New Zealand) Blues / Auckland

=== United States ===
On 14 September, The United States announced their 30-player squad.

Head coach: (Australia) Sione Fukofuka

Player	Position	Date of birth (age)	Caps	Club/province
Alev Kelter	Centre	21 March 1991 (aged 33)	23	(England) Loughborough Lightning
Alivia Leatherman	Prop	9 August 2002 (aged 22)	5	(United States) Life West Gladiatrix
Atumata Hingano	Centre	2 August 1998 (aged 25)	6	(United States) USA Sevens
Bulou Mataitoga	Fullback	8 April 1994 (aged 30)	18	(England) Loughborough Lightning
Cassidy Bargell	Scrum-half	28 December 1999 (aged 24)	2	(United States) Beantown RFC
Catie Benson	Prop	10 February 1992 (aged 32)	45	(England) Sale Sharks
Charli Jacoby	Prop	9 October 1989 (aged 34)	29	(England) Exeter Chiefs
Cheta Emba	Fullback	16 July 1993 (aged 31)	9	(United States) USA Sevens
Emerson Allen	??	1 May 1999 (aged 25)	1	(United States) Life West Gladiatrix
Emily Henrich	Centre	10 November 1999 (aged 24)	18	(England) Leicester Tigers
Erica Jarrell	Prop	25 February 1999 (aged 25)	10	(England) Sale Sharks
Gabby Cantorna	Fly-half	2 August 1995 (aged 29)	30	(England) Exeter Chiefs
Hallie Taufo'ou	Second row	26 May 1994 (aged 30)	19	(England) Loughborough Lightning
Hope Rogers	Prop	7 January 1993 (aged 31)	47	(England) Exeter Chiefs
Joanne Fa'avesi	??	5 February 1992 (aged 32)	7	(United States) USA Sevens
Kate Zackary (c)	Number 8	26 July 1989 (aged 35)	37	(England) Trailfinders
Kathryn Treder	Hooker	13 March 1996 (aged 28)	22	(England) Loughborough Lightning
Keia Mae Sagapiolu	Prop	12 May 2000 (aged 24)	11	(England) Leicester Tigers
Kris Thomas	Wing	1 July 1993 (aged 31)	11	(United States) USA Sevens
Maya Learned	Prop	1 January 1996 (aged 28)	13	(United States) Colorado Gray Wolves
McKenzie Hawkins	Fly-half	8 January 1997 (aged 27)	17	(United States) Colorado Grey Wolves
Paige Stathopoulos	Hooker	23 August 1993 (aged 31)	10	(United States) Beantown RFC
Rachel Ehrecke	Flanker	6 December 1999 (aged 24)	15	(United States) Colorado Grey Wolves
Rachel Johnson	Flanker	5 February 1991 (aged 33)	29	(England) Exeter Chiefs
Sophie Pyrz	??	3 August 1996 (aged 28)	2	(United States) Life West Gladiatrix / Rhinos
Summer Harris-Jones	??	27 June 1996 (aged 28)	4	(United States) USA Sevens
Tahlia Brody	Back row	10 September 1994 (aged 30)	12	(England) Leicester Tigers
Taina Tukuafu	Scrum-half	18 August 2001 (aged 23)	10	(United States) Berkeley All Blues
Tess Feury	Fullback	15 March 1996 (aged 28)	28	(England) Leicester Tigers
Tessa Hann	??		1	(United States) Colorado Gray Wolves

== WXV 2 ==
=== Australia ===
Australia announced their 30-player squad on 2 September for their European tour and WXV 2.

Head coach: (England) Joanne Yapp

Player	Position	Date of birth (age)	Caps	Club/province
Lori Cramer	Fullback	8 March 1993 (aged 31)	23	(Australia) Queensland Reds
Biola Dawa	Wing	5 November 2000 (aged 23)	2	(Australia) ACT Brumbies
Lucy Dinnen	Scrum-half	9 February 1993 (aged 31)	0	(Australia) Western Force
Ashley Fernandez	Lock	24 October 2002 (aged 21)	0	(Australia) ACT Brumbies
Georgina Friedrichs	Centre	14 April 1995 (aged 29)	24	(Australia) NSW Waratahs
Sally Fuesaina	Prop	15 February 1992 (aged 32)	3	(Australia) ACT Brumbies
Caitlyn Halse	Utility back	18 September 2006 (aged 18)	2	(Australia) NSW Waratahs
Brianna Hoy	Prop	7 July 2000 (aged 24)	8	(Australia) NSW Waratahs
Eva Karpani	Prop	18 June 1996 (aged 28)	27	(Australia) NSW Waratahs
Lydia Kavoa	Number 8	8 November 1993 (aged 30)	1	(Australia) ACT Brumbies
Atasi Lafai	Lock	24 July 1994 (aged 30)	14	(Australia) NSW Waratahs
Kaitlan Leaney	Lock	10 October 2000 (aged 23)	20	(Australia) NSW Waratahs
Michaela Leonard (c)	Lock	6 March 1995 (aged 29)	27	(Australia) Western Force
Ashley Marsters	Hooker	2 November 1993 (aged 30)	29	(Australia) Melbourne Rebels
Arabella McKenzie	Fly-half	1 March 1999 (aged 25)	26	(Australia) NSW Waratahs
Desiree Miller	Wing	13 January 2002 (aged 22)	7	(Australia) NSW Waratahs
Tiarah Minns	Lock	6 April 2001 (aged 23)	0	(Australia) Melbourne Rebels
Faitala Moleka	Fly-half	29 January 2005 (aged 19)	11	(Australia) ACT Brumbies
Tiarna Molloy	Hooker	8 November 1998 (aged 25)	3	(Australia) Queensland Reds
Layne Morgan	Scrum-half	20 April 1999 (aged 25)	26	(Australia) NSW Waratahs
Tania Naden	Hooker	20 February 1992 (aged 32)	15	(Australia) ACT Brumbies
Leilani Nathan	Flanker	20 July 2000 (aged 24)	7	(Australia) NSW Waratahs
Alapeta Ngauamo	Prop	11 July 1989 (aged 35)	0	(Australia) Western Force
Bridie O'Gorman	Prop	8 December 1998 (aged 25)	22	(Australia) NSW Waratahs
Siokapesi Palu	Flanker	15 October 1996 (aged 27)	11	(Australia) ACT Brumbies
Trilleen Pomare	Centre	5 April 1993 (aged 31)	29	(Australia) Western Force
Cecilia Smith	Centre	13 March 1994 (aged 30)	15	(Australia) Queensland Reds
Maya Stewart	Wing	14 March 2000 (aged 24)	11	(Australia) NSW Waratahs
Tabua Tuinakauvadra	Back row	27 December 2002 (aged 21)	6	(Australia) ACT Brumbies
Natalie Wright	Scrum-half	8 September 2002 (aged 22)	2	(Australia) Queensland Reds

=== Italy ===
Italy announced their 30-player squad on 16 September.

Head coach: (Italy) Giovanni Raineri

Player	Position	Date of birth (age)	Caps	Club/province
Ilaria Arrighetti	Back row	2 March 1993 (aged 31)	57	(France) Stade Rennais Rugby
Chiara Cheli	Hooker		0	(Italy) Rugby Colorno
Giordana Duca	Lock	18 September 1992 (aged 32)	49	(Italy) Valsugana Rugby Padova
Elena Errichiello	Back row			(Italy) Unione Rugby Capitolina
Valeria Fedrighi	Lock	5 September 1992 (aged 32)	55	(Italy) Rugby Colorno
Alessandra Frangipani	Back row	12 July 2003 (aged 21)	8	(Italy) Villorba Rugby
Elisa Giordano	Back row	1 November 1990 (aged 33)	67	(Italy) Valsugana Rugby Padova
Laura Gurioli	Hooker	2 February 1995 (aged 29)	9	(Italy) Villorba Rugby
Gaia Maris	Prop	5 December 2001 (aged 22)	29	(France) ASM Romagnat Rugby
Alissa Ranuccini	Back row	28 June 2000 (aged 24)	8	(Italy) Rugby Colorno
Sara Seye	Prop	26 August 2000 (aged 24)	24	(England) Trailfinders
Francesca Sgorbini	Back row	7 January 2001 (aged 23)	25	(France) ASM Romagnat Rugby
Emanuela Stecca	Prop	24 February 1997 (aged 27)	11	(Italy) Villorba Rugby
Sara Tounesi	Lock	19 July 1995 (aged 29)	41	(France) Montpellier Hérault Rugby
Silvia Turani	Prop	6 July 1995 (aged 29)	35	(England) Harlequins
Vittoria Vecchini	Hooker	13 January 2002 (aged 22)	28	(Italy) Valsugana Rugby Padova
Beatrice Veronese	Back row	11 March 1996 (aged 28)	19	(Italy) Valsugana Rugby Padova
Vittoria Zanette	Forward	29 November 2004 (aged 19)	0	(Italy) Villorba Rugby
Beatrice Capomaggi	Fullback	29 April 1997 (aged 27)	15	(Italy) Villorba Rugby
Sofia Catellani	Back	15 June 2004 (aged 20)	2	(Italy) Rugby Colorno
Francesca Granzotto	Scrum-half	22 March 2002 (aged 22)	13	(Italy) Villorba Rugby
Veronica Madia	Fly-half	16 January 1995 (aged 29)	51	(Italy) Rugby Colorno
Sara Mannini	Centre	28 August 2005 (aged 19)	1	(Italy) Rugby Colorno
Nicole Mastrangelo	Centre	21 September 2003 (aged 21)	1	(Italy) Unione Rugby Capitolina
Aura Muzzo	Wing	12 April 1997 (aged 27)	46	(Italy) Villorba Rugby
Vittoria Ostuni Minuzzi	Fullback	6 December 2001 (aged 22)	34	(Italy) Valsugana Rugby Padova
Beatrice Rigoni	Centre	1 August 1995 (aged 29)	76	(England) Sale Sharks
Michela Sillari	Centre	23 February 1993 (aged 31)	83	(Italy) Valsugana Rugby Padova
Sofia Stefan	Scrum-half	12 May 1992 (aged 32)	89	(England) Sale Sharks
Emma Stevanin	Fly-half	11 April 2002 (aged 22)	15	(Italy) Valsugana Rugby Padova

=== Japan ===
Japan announced their final squad on 4 September 2024.

Head coach: (Canada) Lesley McKenzie

Player	Position	Date of birth (age)	Caps	Club/province
Megumi Abe	Scrum-half	28 April 1998 (aged 26)	25	(Japan) Arukas Queen Kumagaya
Komachi Imakugi	Wing	6 January 2002 (aged 22)	26	(Japan) Arukas Queen Kumagaya
Ayasa Otsuka	Fly-half	5 May 1999 (aged 25)	28	(Japan) Arukas Queen Kumagaya
Mele Yua Havili Kagawa	Centre	29 September 2001 (aged 22)	2	(Japan) Nanairo Prism Fukuoka
Sachiko Kato	Prop	19 February 2000 (aged 24)	25	(Japan) Yokogawa Musashino Artemi-Stars
Masami Kawamura	Second row	13 July 1999 (aged 25)	16	
Wako Kitano	Prop	8 September 1999 (aged 25)	15	(Japan) Mie Pearls
Asuka Kuge	Prop	22 September 1994 (aged 30)	15	(Japan) Arukas Queen Kumagaya
Sakurako Korai	Back row	9 April 2003 (aged 21)	16	(Japan) Nippon Sport Science University
Ayumu Kokaji	Hooker	24 November 2000 (aged 23)	8	(Japan) Tokyo Sankyu Phoenix
Kanako Kobayashi	Centre	13 November 1998 (aged 25)	14	(Japan) Yokogawa Musashino Artemi-Stars
Hinata Komaki	Hooker	9 May 2001 (aged 23)	17	(Japan) Tokyo Sankyu Phoenix
Seina Saito	Back row	30 May 1992 (aged 32)	44	(Japan) Mie Pearls
Yuka Sadaka	Prop	2 November 1994 (aged 29)	20	(Japan) Yokogawa Musashino Artemi-Stars
Yuna Sato	Second row	11 September 1998 (aged 26)	17	(Japan) Tokyo Sankyu Phoenix
Anan Seo	Scrum-half	16 July 2001 (aged 23)	1	(Japan) Tokyo Sankyu Phoenix
Kotomi Taniguchi	Hooker	10 April 1995 (aged 29)	20	(Japan) Yokogawa Musashino Artemi-Stars
Moe Tsukui	Scrum-half	28 March 2000 (aged 24)	35	(Japan) Yokogawa Musashino Artemi-Stars
Ayano Nagai	Back row	14 October 1997 (aged 26)	26	(Japan) Yokohama TKM
Iroha Nagata	Back row	21 December 1998 (aged 25)	34	(Japan) Arukas Queen Kumagaya
Nijiho Nagata	Hooker	6 December 2000 (aged 23)	23	(Japan) Mie Pearls
Sora Nishimura	Back	29 September 2000 (aged 23)	14	(Japan) Mie Pearls
Haruka Hirotsu	Back	29 October 2000 (aged 23)	10	(Japan) Nanairo Prism Fukuoka
Mana Furuta	Centre	16 November 1997 (aged 26)	30	(Japan) Tokyo Sankyu Phoenix
Kyoko Hosokawa	Back row	8 July 1999 (aged 25)	13	(Japan) Mie Pearls
Misaki Matsumura	Back	6 March 2005 (aged 19)	8	(Japan) Tokyo Sankyu Phoenix
Manami Mine	Forward	11 September 2003 (aged 21)	7	(Japan) Nippon Sport Science University
Minori Yamamoto	Fly-half	9 December 1996 (aged 27)	32	(Japan) Yokohama TKM
Otoka Yoshimura	Second row	15 May 2001 (aged 23)	22	(Japan) Arukas Queen Kumagaya
Jennifer Nduka	Second row	18 October 2000 (aged 23)	8	(Japan) Hokkaido Barbarians Diana

=== Scotland ===
Scotland announced their final squad on 27 August 2024.

^{1} On 10 September 2024, Emma Wassell was replaced by Louise McMillan, after being diagnosed with a tumour in her chest.

Head coach: (Scotland) Bryan Easson

Player	Position	Date of birth (age)	Caps	Club/province
Leah Bartlett	Prop	28 August 1998 (aged 26)	36	(England) Leicester Tigers
Christine Belisle	Prop	4 November 1993 (aged 30)	36	(England) Loughborough Lightning
Sarah Bonar	Lock	9 February 1994 (aged 30)	38	(England) Harlequins
Elliann Clarke	Prop	16 February 2001 (aged 23)	12	(England) Bristol Bears
Lisa Cockburn	Prop	6 December 1992 (aged 31)	30	(England) Gloucester-Hartpury
Eva Donaldson	Second row	10 July 2001 (aged 23)	12	(England) Leicester Tigers
Evie Gallagher	Number 8	22 August 2000 (aged 24)	28	(England) Bristol Bears
Jade Konkel	Number 8	9 December 1993 (aged 30)	63	(England) Harlequins
Rachel Malcolm	Back row	23 May 1991 (aged 33)	48	(England) Loughborough Lightning
Elis Martin	Hooker	23 May 1999 (aged 25)	11	(England) Loughborough Lightning
Fiona McIntosh	Second row	25 October 1999 (aged 24)	3	(England) Saracens
Rachel McLachlan	Back row	26 February 1999 (aged 25)	43	(France) Montpellier HR
Lana Skeldon	Hooker	18 October 1993 (aged 30)	70	(England) Bristol Bears
Aila Ronald	Hooker	18 April 2004 (aged 20)	0	(Scotland) University of Edinburgh
Alex Stewart	Back row	28 May 2004 (aged 20)	6	(Scotland) Corstorphine Cougars
Emma Wassell^{1}	Second row	28 December 1994 (aged 29)	67	(England) Loughborough Lightning
Louise McMillan^{1}	Second row	27 July 1997 (aged 27)	54	(England) Saracens
Anne Young	Prop	17 March 2000 (aged 24)	11	(England) Loughborough Lightning
Leia Brebner-Holden	Scrum-half	26 May 2002 (aged 22)	1	(England) Gloucester-Hartpury / Cheltenham Tigers
Coreen Grant	Wing	30 January 1998 (aged 26)	12	(England) Saracens
Caity Mattinson	Scrum-half	17 May 1996 (aged 28)	23	(England) Trailfinders
Mairi McDonald	Scrum-half	25 November 1997 (aged 26)	24	(England) Exeter Chiefs
Francesca McGhie	Wing	7 May 2003 (aged 21)	13	(England) Leicester Tigers
Rhona Lloyd	Wing	17 October 1996 (aged 27)	50	(France) Stade Bordelais / GB 7s
Helen Nelson	Fly-half	24 May 1994 (aged 30)	61	(England) Loughborough Lightning
Emma Orr	Centre	6 April 2003 (aged 21)	20	(England) Bristol Bears
Rachel Philipps	Centre	7 January 2002 (aged 22)	0	(England) Sale Sharks
Lisa Thomson	Centre	7 September 1997 (aged 27)	60	(England) Trailfinders / GB 7s
Chloe Rollie	Fullback	26 June 1995 (aged 29)	66	(England) Trailfinders
Lucia Scott	Fullback	3 February 2004 (aged 20)	1	(England) Hartpury University/Gloucester-Hartpury
Meryl Smith	Centre	11 June 2001 (aged 23)	18	(England) Bristol Bears

=== South Africa ===
On 22 September, South Africa announced their 30-member squad to WXV2.

Head coach: (South Africa) Swys de Bruin

Player	Position	Date of birth (age)	Caps	Club/province
Lindelwa Gwala	Hooker	24 August 1997 (aged 27)	33	(England) Trailfinders
Roseline Botes	Hooker	25 November 1999 (aged 24)	20	(South Africa) DHL Western Province
Micke Günter	Hooker	25 October 1998 (aged 25)	8	(South Africa) Bulls Daisies
Azisa Mkiva	Prop	9 February 1999 (aged 25)	10	(South Africa) DHL Western Province
Babalwa Latsha	Prop	31 March 1994 (aged 30)	30	(England) Harlequins Women
Sanelisiwe Charlie	Prop	1 May 2000 (aged 24)	19	(South Africa) Bulls Daisies
Yonela Ngxingolo	Prop	3 March 1998 (aged 26)	29	(South Africa) Bulls Daisies
Danelle Lochner	Second row	16 May 1997 (aged 27)	13	(England) Harlequins Women
Vainah Ubisi	Second row	20 March 2003 (aged 21)	15	(South Africa) Bulls Daisies
Nolusindiso Booi (c)	Second row	29 June 1985 (aged 39)	46	(South Africa) DHL Western Province
Aseza Hele	Back row	26 November 1994 (aged 29)	22	(South Africa) Boland Dames
Sinazo Mcatshulwa	Back row	24 December 1996 (aged 27)	32	(South Africa) DHL Western Province
Sizophila Solontsi	Back row	9 March 1992 (aged 32)	22	(South Africa) Bulls Daisies
Lusanda Dumke	Back row	11 September 1996 (aged 28)	30	(South Africa) Bulls Daisies
Anathi Qolo	Back row	21 February 1998 (aged 26)	4	(South Africa) Bulls Daisies
Catha Jacobs	Back row	6 February 1998 (aged 26)	16	(England) Leicester Tigers Women
Tayla Kinsey	Scrum-half	5 September 1993 (aged 31)	36	(South Africa) Sharks Women
Felicia Jacobs	Scrum-half	7 April 1998 (aged 26)	6	(South Africa) Boland Dames
Unam Tose	Scrum-half	3 May 2000 (aged 24)	20	(South Africa) Bulls Daisies
Libbie Janse van Rensburg	Fly-half	28 September 1994 (aged 29)	23	(South Africa) Bulls Daisies
Byrhandre Dolf	Fly-half	4 July 2003 (aged 21)	14	(South Africa) Bulls Daisies
Chumisa Qawe	Centre	15 November 1999 (aged 24)	16	(South Africa) Bulls Daisies
Eloise Webb	Centre	5 March 1996 (aged 28)	11	(South Africa) Border Ladies
Aphiwe Ngwevu	Centre	14 May 1998 (aged 26)	23	(South Africa) Border Ladies
Zintle Mpupha	Centre	25 December 1993 (aged 30)	21	(South Africa) Bulls Daisies
Jakkie Cilliers	Wing	30 October 2000 (aged 23)	14	(South Africa) Bulls Daisies
Ayanda Malinga	Wing	23 June 1998 (aged 26)	8	(South Africa) Bulls Daisies
Maria Tshiremba	Wing	29 December 1995 (aged 28)	0	(South Africa) Bulls Daisies
Maceala Samboya	Wing	30 July 1999 (aged 25)	4	(South Africa) Boland Dames
Nadine Roos	Fullback	9 May 1996 (aged 28)	12	South Africa 7s

=== Wales ===
On 16 September, Wales announced their 30-member squad to WXV2.

^{1} On 26 September 2024, Rosie Carr was replaced by her sister Katie Carr, after her injury during the September 20 test against Australia.

Head coach: (Wales) Ioan Cunningham

Player	Position	Date of birth (age)	Caps	Club/province
Rosie Carr^{1}	Hooker	2 March 2002 (aged 22)	1	(England) Bristol Bears
Katie Carr^{1}	Hooker	2 March 2002 (aged 22)		
Carys Phillips	Hooker	12 November 1992 (aged 31)	75	(England) Harlequins
Molly Reardon	Hooker	22 September 2003 (aged 21)	3	(Wales) Cardiff Met
Abbey Constable	Prop	18 June 1991 (aged 33)	8	(England) Gloucester-Hartpury
Maisie Davies	Prop	17 August 2005 (aged 19)	1	
Gwenllian Pyrs	Prop	28 November 1997 (aged 26)	36	(England) Bristol Bears
Donna Rose	Prop	5 June 1991 (aged 33)	23	(England) Saracens
Jenni Scoble	Prop	28 March 1993 (aged 31)	0	
Sisilia Tuipulotu	Prop	14 August 2003 (aged 21)	21	(England) Gloucester-Hartpury
Georgia Evans	Second row	29 January 1997 (aged 27)	28	(England) Saracens
Abbie Fleming	Second row	31 March 1996 (aged 28)	19	(England) Harlequins
Natalia John	Second row	15 February 1996 (aged 28)	40	(Wales) Brython Thunder
Alaw Pyrs	Second row	12 October 2005 (aged 18)	1	(England) Hartpury College
Alex Callender	Back row	29 July 2000 (aged 24)	37	(England) Harlequins
Alisha Joyce-Butchers	Back row	14 June 1997 (aged 27)	48	(England) Bristol Bears
Bryonie King	Back row	14 August 2003 (aged 21)	4	(England) Bristol Bears
Bethan Lewis	Back row	19 February 1999 (aged 25)	45	(England) Gloucester-Hartpury
Kate Williams	Back row	5 April 2000 (aged 24)	13	(England) Gloucester-Hartpury
Keira Bevan	Scrum-half	28 April 1997 (aged 27)	62	(England) Bristol Bears
Sian Jones	Scrum-half	3 December 2004 (aged 19)	5	(England) Gloucester-Hartpury
Lleucu George	Fly-half	12 January 2000 (aged 24)	22	(England) Gloucester-Hartpury
Carys Cox	Centre	5 November 1998 (aged 25)	8	(England) Trailfinders
Hannah Jones (c)	Centre	14 November 1996 (aged 27)	57	(England) Gloucester-Hartpury
Kerin Lake	Centre	24 May 1990 (aged 34)	49	
Hannah Bluck	Wing	1 April 1997 (aged 27)	11	(Wales) Brython Thunder
Jasmine Joyce-Butchers	Wing	9 October 1995 (aged 28)	38	(United Kingdom) Great Britain 7s
Jenny Hesketh	Fullback	15 April 2002 (aged 22)	2	(England) Bristol Bears
Courtney Keight	Fullback	27 December 1997 (aged 26)	13	(England) Bristol Bears
Nel Metcalfe	Fullback	17 December 2004 (aged 19)	3	(England) Gloucester-Hartpury
Kayleigh Powell	Fullback	18 February 1999 (aged 25)	16	(United Kingdom) Great Britain 7s

== WXV 3 ==
=== Fiji ===
Fiji's 30-player squad for the tournament.

Head coach: (Fiji) Mosese Rauluni

Player	Position	Date of birth (age)	Caps	Club/province
Bitila Tawake	Prop	2 April 1999 (aged 25)	17	(New Zealand) Chiefs Manawa
Salanieta Nabuli	Prop	7 February 2003 (aged 21)	5	(Fiji) Fijian Drua
Loraini Senivutu	Forward	23 January 2003 (aged 21)	6	(Fiji) Fijian Drua
Tiana Robanakadavu	Prop	17 July 2005 (aged 19)	9	(Fiji) Fijian Drua
Penina Turova	Forward	1 October 1999 (aged 24)	0	
Merevesi Ofakimalino	Forward	30 March 1994 (aged 30)		(Fiji) Fijian Drua
Unaisi Lalabalavu	Hooker	1 March 2004 (aged 20)		(Fiji) Fijian Drua
Anasimeci Korovata	Prop	1 August 1996 (aged 28)	12	(Fiji) Fijian Drua
Doreen Narokete	Lock	9 April 2002 (aged 22)	15	(Australia) Queensland Reds
Nunia Daunimoala	Lock	30 June 1999 (aged 25)	12	(Fiji) Fijian Drua
Sulita Waisega	Back row	16 March 2004 (aged 20)	20	(Fiji) Fijian Drua
Karalaini Naisewa	Back row	23 July 1994 (aged 30)	22	(Fiji) Fijian Drua
Sereima Leweniqila	Forward	5 May 1990 (aged 34)		(Fiji) Fijian Drua
Mereoni Nakesa	Lock	17 February 2003 (aged 21)	15	(Fiji) Fijian Drua
Teresia Tinanivalu	Back row	26 March 1995 (aged 29)		(Fiji) Fijian Drua
Evivi Senikarivi	Scrum-half	12 June 2000 (aged 24)	16	(Fiji) Fijian Drua
Salanieta Kinita	Fly-half	14 September 2001 (aged 23)	8	(Fiji) Fijian Drua
Vani Arei	Centre	14 April 1999 (aged 25)		(Fiji) Fijian Drua
Wainikiti Vosadrau	Back			
Adita Milinia	Wing	29 June 2003 (aged 21)	15	(Fiji) Fijian Drua
Adi Fulori Rotagavira	Back			(Fiji) Fijian Drua
Merewai Cumu	Centre	31 July 1998 (aged 26)		(Fiji) Fijian Drua
Rusila Nagasau	Back	4 August 1987 (aged 37)		
Setaita Railumu	Scrum-half	18 April 2001 (aged 23)	13	(Fiji) Fijian Drua
Jennifer Goodsir Ravutia	Fly-half	12 May 1995 (aged 29)	12	(Fiji) Fijian Drua
Merewairita Neivosa	Centre	13 January 2003 (aged 21)	11	(Fiji) Fijian Drua
Atelaite Buna	Fullback	25 July 2000 (aged 24)	4	(Fiji) Fijian Drua
Luisa Tisolo	Fullback	20 September 1991 (aged 33)	19	(Fiji) Fijian Drua
Mary Kanace	Back		0	
Iva Sauira	Wing	30 August 2001 (aged 23)	0	(Fiji) Fijian Drua

=== Hong Kong ===
On August 19, Hong Kong announced their 30-player squad for the tournament.

Head coach: (New Zealand) Andrew Douglas

Player	Position	Date of birth (age)	Caps	Club/province
Lau Nga-wun	Prop	30 July 1992 (aged 32)	23	(Hong Kong) Gai Wu
Tsang Hoi-Laam	Hooker	11 May 1998 (aged 26)	4	(Hong Kong) Gai Wu
Megan Richardson	Forward	23 October 1991 (aged 32)	3	
Kea Herewini	Forward	27 January 2000 (aged 24)	3	(Hong Kong) Valley RFC
Lee Ka-Shun	Prop	24 March 1989 (aged 35)	26	(Hong Kong) Gai Wu
Tanya Dhar	Hooker	20 September 2000 (aged 24)	5	(Hong Kong) Valley RFC
Yuei-Tein Fion Got	Forward	20 May 1993 (aged 31)	6	(Hong Kong) HKFC
Leung Choi-See	Forward			
Chloe Baltazar	Lock	13 May 2000 (aged 24)	7	(Hong Kong) USRC Tigers
Morena Grierson	Lock	26 January 2003 (aged 21)	0	(Hong Kong) Kowloon RFC
Roshini Turner	Lock	26 November 1996 (aged 27)	10	(Hong Kong) HKFC
Chow Mei-Nam	Lock	14 November 1988 (aged 35)	24	(Hong Kong) Gai Wu
Chan Tsz-Ching	Back row	14 March 1996 (aged 28)	10	(Hong Kong) HKFC
Micayla Baltazar	Back row	26 June 2003 (aged 21)	5	(Hong Kong) USRC Tigers
Pun Wai-Yan (c)	Back row	6 April 1995 (aged 29)	16	(Hong Kong) Gai Wu
Shanna Forrest	Back row	4 January 2002 (aged 22)	3	(Hong Kong) Kowloon RFC
Karen Hoi-Ting So	Back row	27 April 1990 (aged 34)	16	(Hong Kong) Valley RFC
Au King-To	Scrum-half	19 July 1996 (aged 28)	7	(Hong Kong) Gai Wu
Jessica Wai-On Ho	Scrum-half	12 May 1992 (aged 32)	18	(Hong Kong) USRC Tigers
Wan Tsz-Yau	Scrum-half	17 September 1999 (aged 25)	1	(Hong Kong) Gai Wu
Georgia Rivers	Fly-half	20 August 2004 (aged 20)	2	(Hong Kong) Kowloon RFC
Fung Hoi-Ching	Fly-half	18 April 1999 (aged 25)	6	(Hong Kong) Gai Wu
Qian Jiayu	Centre	29 March 1998 (aged 26)	7	(Hong Kong) Gai Wu
Natasha Olson-Thorne	Centre	6 October 1992 (aged 31)	30	(Hong Kong) USRC Tigers
Gabriella Rivers	Centre	16 August 2002 (aged 22)	3	(Hong Kong) HKFC
Lucia Bolton	Centre	4 June 2001 (aged 23)	0	(Hong Kong) HKFC
Chong Ka-Yan	Back	24 November 1993 (aged 30)	17	(Hong Kong) USRC Tigers
Zoe Smith	Back	15 May 1992 (aged 32)	7	(Hong Kong) Valley RFC
Sabay Lynam	Back	15 September 2003 (aged 21)	3	(Hong Kong) Kowloon RFC
Haruka Uematsu	Back	17 August 2006 (aged 18)	0	(Hong Kong) Valley RFC

=== Madagascar ===
Madagascar announced their final squad on 16 September 2024.

Head coach: (Madagascar) Alain Randriamihaja

Player	Position	Date of birth (age)	Caps	Club/province
Oliviane Yvanah Andriatsilavina	Second row	9 June 2005 (aged 19)	7	(Madagascar) SCB Besarety
Marie Bodonandrianina	Centre	16 March 1997 (aged 27)	7	(Madagascar) FTFA
Felana Rakotoarison	Second row	21 January 1993 (aged 31)	3	(Madagascar) FTM Manjakaray
Laurence Rasoanandrasana	Hooker	6 December 1992 (aged 31)	9	(Madagascar) SCB Besarety
Claudia Rasoarimalala	Wing	7 August 1985 (aged 39)	12	(Madagascar) FTFA
Tiana Razanamahefa	Fullback	26 May 2000 (aged 24)	4	(Madagascar) SCB Besarety
Sousou	??			(Madagascar) FTFA
Rojo	??			(Madagascar) FTFA
Mamisoa Rasoarimalala	Prop	5 April 1993 (aged 31)	7	(Madagascar) FTM Manjakaray
Joela Mirasoa Fenohasina	Scrum-half	1 March 1995 (aged 29)	9	(Madagascar) FTFA
Olivia Hanitriniaina	Back	11 April 2000 (aged 24)	3	(Madagascar) 3FB Fahasalamana
Eleonore Rasoanantenaina	Second row	11 October 1987 (aged 36)	7	(Madagascar) FTM Manjakaray
Mialy Ravaoarinoro	Back row	26 May 1993 (aged 31)	4	(Madagascar) 3FB Fahasalamana
Aina Rakotozafy	Hooker	8 December 1994 (aged 29)	7	(Madagascar) ASUT
Vonjy	??			(Madagascar) 3FB Fahasalamana
Vacilly Rahariravaka	Back	13 August 1997 (aged 27)	2	(Madagascar) Rugby Club Tanora Soavimasoandro
Voahirana Razafiarisoa	Fly-half	1 September 1986 (aged 38)	9	(Madagascar) 3FB Fahasalamana
Sariaka Nomenjanahary	Back row	30 May 1996 (aged 28)	9	(Madagascar) SCB Besarety
Elinah Raminoarisoa	Forward	9 July 2006 (aged 18)	0	(Madagascar) Rugby Club Tanora Soavimasoandro
Miora Rabarivelo	Prop	18 July 1989 (aged 35)	8	(Madagascar) SCB Besarety
Vonjimalala Ranorovololona	Scrum-half	7 January 1991 (aged 33)	7	(Madagascar) SCB Besarety
Delphine Raharimalala	Back row	30 April 1994 (aged 30)	11	(Madagascar) SCB Besarety
Nanou Razafializay	Prop	28 February 1993 (aged 31)	9	(Madagascar) SCB Besarety
Valisoa Erickah Razanakiniana	Fly-half	26 March 2004 (aged 20)	7	(Madagascar) SCB Besarety
Nomenjanahary Rakotozafy	Hooker	8 December 1994 (aged 29)	1	(Madagascar) SCB Besarety
Fenitra Razafindramanga	Prop	22 November 1999 (aged 24)	9	(Madagascar) FTM Manjakaray
Zaya Fanantenana	Wing	10 February 2003 (aged 21)	5	(Madagascar) SCB Besarety
Veronique Rasoanekena	Centre	17 June 1997 (aged 27)	9	(Madagascar) Rugby Club Tanora Soavimasoandro
Sarindra Sahondramalala	Back row	4 March 1993 (aged 31)	3	(Madagascar) 3FB Fahasalamana
Volatiana Rasoanandrasana	Second row	29 June 1988 (aged 36)	2	(Madagascar) FTFA

=== Netherlands ===
Netherlands 30-player squad for the tournament.

Head coach: (Netherlands) Sylke Haverkorn

Player	Position	Date of birth (age)	Caps	Club/province
Anniek Nauta	??	10 March 2000 (aged 24)		
Anouk Veerkamp	Hooker	29 January 2002 (aged 22)	7	(England) Hartpury University
Anoushka Beukers	Hooker	15 September 1999 (aged 25)	8	(Netherlands) Dames Bredase RC
Brechtje Karst	Prop	10 March 2003 (aged 21)	5	No Club
Elisabeth Boot	Loose forward	16 September 1998 (aged 26)	5	(Netherlands) RC Diok
Gwen van der Schoot	??	15 November 2005 (aged 18)	0	(Netherlands) RC Delft
Inger Jongerius	Lock	12 December 1995 (aged 28)	12	(Netherlands) RC Waterland
Isa Prins	Lock	4 June 2003 (aged 21)	7	(Ireland) Suttonians RFC
Jara Bunnik	??	2 May 2001 (aged 23)	2	
Julia Morauw	Prop	22 June 2002 (aged 22)	7	(Netherlands) Amsterdamse Atletiek Club
Linde van der Velden (c)	Loose forward	20 February 1995 (aged 29)	14	(England) Exeter Chiefs
Mariet Luijken	Loose forward	29 November 2003 (aged 20)	7	(Netherlands) RC Diok
Mhina de Vos	Forward	24 April 1998 (aged 26)	8	(Netherlands) Rugbyende Utrechtse Studenten
Morgane ter Cock	??	9 July 2003 (aged 21)	1	
Nicky Dix	Prop	7 March 2000 (aged 24)	14	(Netherlands) RC Waterland
Noah Demba	??	6 October 1998 (aged 25)	1	(Netherlands) Rugbyende Utrechtse Studenten
Sydney de Weijer	Prop	17 June 2003 (aged 21)	7	(Netherlands) Amsterdamse Atletiek Club
Emma van Traa	Fly-half	2 April 2006 (aged 18)	1	(Netherlands) The Vets
Esmee Ligtvoet	Scrum-half	23 June 2003 (aged 21)	8	(Ireland) Suttonians RFC
Gaya van Nifterik	Wing	16 October 1998 (aged 25)	5	(Netherlands) Rugbyende Utrechtse Studenten
Isa Spoler	Centre	27 June 2004 (aged 20)	4	
Jet Metz	Fly-half	19 September 2003 (aged 21)	5	
Kika Mulling	Wing	6 April 1999 (aged 25)	3	(Netherlands) NRC The Wasps
Lieve Stallmann	Fullback	21 January 2000 (aged 24)	10	(Spain) Crealia El Salvador
Linneke Gevers	Centre	9 March 1998 (aged 26)	2	No Club
Lisa Egberts	Scrum-half	3 December 2001 (aged 22)	0	No Club
Marit Lemmens	Back	20 April 1998 (aged 26)	8	(Netherlands) Amsterdamse Atletiek Club
Pien Selbeck	Centre	14 October 1984 (aged 39)	13	(Netherlands) RC Waterland
Pleuni Kievit	Fullback	10 March 1997 (aged 27)	4	
Senne Hoog	Wing	7 June 2005 (aged 19)	4	

=== Samoa ===
On 12 September, Samoa announced their 30-player squad.

Head coach: (Samoa) Ramsey Tomokino

Player	Position	Date of birth (age)	Caps	Club/province
Ana-Maria Afuie	Back	17 April 1997 (aged 27)	3	(Australia) Sunnybank RFC
Denise Aiolupotea	Prop	1 October 1998 (aged 25)	1	(New Zealand) MAC Rugby / Hawkes Bay
Tietie Aiolupotea	Back	4 December 1995 (aged 28)	1	(New Zealand) MAC Rugby / Hawkes Bay
Utumalama Atonio	Back row	7 November 1999 (aged 24)	12	(New Zealand) Papatoetoe RFC / Counties Manukau
France Bloomfield	Back	17 July 1998 (aged 26)	6	(New Zealand) College Rifles RFC / Auckland
Tyra Boysen-Auimatagi	Centre	3 January 2001 (aged 23)	1	(Australia) Northern Panthers RUFC
Lutia Col Aumua	Back	23 September 2003 (aged 21)	5	
Drenna Falaniko	Back	30 January 2004 (aged 20)	0	(New Zealand) Petone RFC / Wellington
Joanna Fanene-Lolo	Back row	11 November 1998 (aged 25)	0	(New Zealand) Marist Old Boys / Auckland
Linda Fiafia	Wing	8 September 1993 (aged 31)	11	
Avau Valentina Filimaua	Forward	4 August 2003 (aged 21)	5	(New Zealand) Linwood RFC / Canterbury
Ruby Finau	Centre	25 January 1992 (aged 32)	0	(Australia) University of Queensland
Nina Foaese	Back row	24 October 1988 (aged 35)	20	(New Zealand) Norths RFC / Wellington
Tori Iosefo	Prop	23 August 1995 (aged 29)	1	(New Zealand) MAC Rugby / Hawkes Bay
Davina Lasini	Back	31 October 1996 (aged 27)	1	(Australia) Brothers Rugby Club
Saelua Leaula	Scrum-half	17 July 1997 (aged 27)	12	
Cathy Ulu'ulumatafolau Leuta	Hooker	27 July 2001 (aged 23)	7	(New Zealand) Papatoetoe RFC / Counties Manukau
Fa'asua Makisi	Centre	16 March 1994 (aged 30)		(New Zealand) Oriental Rongotai / Wellington
Ana Mamea	Forward	23 November 2001 (aged 22)	9	(New Zealand) Papatoetoe RFC / Counties Manukau
Sydney Niupulusu	Lock	2 July 1996 (aged 28)	2	(Australia) Endeavour Hills
Easter Savelio	Lock	4 April 1999 (aged 25)	17	(Australia) Tuggeranong Vikings
Angel Schwencke	Forward		2	(New Zealand) Petone RFC / Wellington
Machiko Fepulea'i	Back row	10 July 2002 (aged 22)	0	(Australia) Easts RUC
Cassie Siataga	Fly-half	27 November 1995 (aged 28)	12	(New Zealand) Linwood RFC / Canterbury
Ana-Lise Sio	Lock	3 January 1996 (aged 28)	3	(Australia) Tuggeranong Vikings
Sui Pauaraisa	Back row	30 October 1987 (aged 36)	21	(New Zealand) Linwood RFC / Canterbury
Ti Tauasosi	Forward	6 November 1987 (aged 36)	7	(New Zealand) Marist Old Boys / Auckland
Harmony Vatau	Back	19 April 2004 (aged 20)	1	(Australia) Endeavour Hills
Moega Wright	Lock	24 November 1992 (aged 31)	3	(Australia) Sunnybank RFC
Karla Wright-Akeli	Back	15 September 2001 (aged 23)	5	(New Zealand) Ponsonby Fillies / Auckland

=== Spain ===
Spain announced their final squad on 3 September 2024.

^{1} On 15 September 2024, Mónica Castelo was replaced by Elena Martínez, after suffering during training a bone fissure on her right eye.

^{2} On 3 October 2024, María Calvo was replaced by Victoria Rosell, after the knee injury suffered during the Madagascar match.

Head coach: (Spain) Juan González Marruecos

Player	Position	Date of birth (age)	Caps	Club/province
María del Castillo	Hooker	11 January 1996 (aged 28)	14	(Spain) Olímpico de Pozuelo
Inés Antolínez	Prop	12 June 1996 (aged 28)	14	(Spain) Crealia El Salvador
Cristina Blanco	Hooker	30 September 1995 (aged 28)	23	(England) Trailfinders
María de las Huertas Román	Prop	12 February 1999 (aged 25)	15	(Spain) Simón Verde Magnolia Cocos
Nuria Jou	Prop	10 November 2001 (aged 22)	6	(Spain) UE Santboiana
Sidorella Bracic	Prop	12 June 1993 (aged 31)	18	(Spain) Crealia El Salvador
Laura Delgado	Prop	30 June 1988 (aged 36)	42	(England) Harlequins
Mireia de Andrés	Prop	10 September 1999 (aged 25)	4	(Spain) Sant Cugat
Anna Puig	Second row	14 October 1999 (aged 24)	32	(Spain) UE Santboiana
Mónica Castelo^{1}	Second row	18 April 1987 (aged 37)	26	(France) Stade Rennais
Elena Martínez^{1}	Second row	9 September 1995 (aged 29)	4	(France) Stade Rennais
Lourdes Alameda	Second row	2 July 1989 (aged 35)	32	(France) AC Bobigny 93 Rugby
Nadina Cisa	Second row	24 July 1993 (aged 31)	8	(France) LOU Rugby
Nerea García	Back row	17 November 1996 (aged 27)	6	(Spain) Crealia El Salvador
Alba Capell	Back row	28 October 2003 (aged 20)	18	(England) Sale Sharks
Lia Piñeiro	Prop	28 August 2001 (aged 23)	4	(Spain) Olímpico de Pozuelo
María Calvo^{2}	Back row	16 February 1999 (aged 25)	27	(Spain) Complutense Cisneros
Victoria Rosell^{2}	Back row	30 September 2005 (aged 18)	0	(Spain) Turia - Les Abelles
Carmen Castellucci	Second row	26 August 2002 (aged 22)	19	(England) Gloucester-Hartpury
Lucía Díaz	Scrum-half	4 February 1998 (aged 26)	30	(Spain) Silicius Majadahonda
Maider Aresti	Centre	24 July 2003 (aged 21)	10	(Spain) Simón Verde Magnolia Cocos
Anne Fernández de Corres	Scrum-half	30 May 1998 (aged 26)	23	(Spain) Spanish Rugby Federation
Amàlia Argudo	Fly-half	24 January 2000 (aged 24)	15	(France) Stade Toulousain
Naroa Azpitarte	Centre	20 November 2005 (aged 18)	2	(Spain) Getxo Artea
Zahía Pérez	Fly-half	14 January 2004 (aged 20)	19	(Spain) Silicius Majadahonda
Claudia Cano	Fly-half	2 August 2005 (aged 19)	4	(Spain) Complutense Cisneros
Alba Vinuesa	Wing	30 March 1999 (aged 25)	25	(France) Stade Français Paris
Claudia Pérez	Wing	29 June 2004 (aged 20)	13	(Spain) Silicius Majadahonda
Clara Piquero	Fullback	11 February 1999 (aged 25)	19	(France) Lons Section paloise
Martina Márquez	Centre	29 January 2003 (aged 21)	5	(Spain) AVR FC Barcelona
Claudia Peña	Fullback	26 October 2004 (aged 19)	16	(England) Harlequins
Lea Ducher	Fullback	29 April 2002 (aged 22)	5	(Spain) Simón Verde Magnolia Cocos
