= 2025 Super Rugby Women's season =

Australian and Fijian rugby season

- Countries: Australia (4 teams); Fiji (1 team)
- Tournament format(s): Round-robin and knockout
- Champions: New South Wales Waratahs (6th title)
- Matches played: 13 (Note: There are thirteen scheduled fixtures, however the “Penina Pasifika” team plays an Australian Super Rugby Women's team between rounds 1–4 as a development match.)
- Official website: Super Rugby Women's

The 2025 Super Rugby Women's season was the eighth season of the top-flight Australian and Fijian women's rugby union competition, Super Rugby. The season fixtures were released on 20 November 2024, consisting of five rounds (two matches per round), and a Finals series to decide the season champions. The season fixture had a notable admission of the former team based in Victoria, the Melbourne Rebels. Rugby Australia (RA) announced in May 2024 that the men's team would be axed from the men's competition following the 2024 season. It was revealed later in the year (October 2024) that the women's team would also be axed.

It was also revealed that the 2025 Super Rugby Women's season champions would play the champions of the New Zealand domestic champions (Super Rugby Aupiki) following the conclusion of the season, also known as the Super Rugby Champions Final. It will be the first edition of the new competition.

The New South Wales Waratahs are the defending champions.

== Teams ==
Locations of the 2025 Super Rugby Women's teams

=== Stadia and locations ===
Union	Team	Location(s)	Stadia	Capacity
Australia	ACT Brumbies	Bruce, Australian Capital Territory	Canberra Stadium	25,011
Australia	ACT Brumbies	Wanniassa, Australian Capital Territory	Viking Park	7,000
Australia	New South Wales Waratahs	Moore Park, New South Wales	Sydney Football Stadium	42,500
Australia	Queensland Reds	Herston, Queensland	Ballymore Stadium	6,000
Australia	Western Force	Perth, Western Australia	Perth Rectangular Stadium	20,500
Fiji	Fijiana Drua	Lautoka, Ba Province	Churchill Park	10,000

=== Personnel ===
Team	Coach	Captain
ACT Brumbies	Andy Friend	Siokapesi Palu
Fijiana Drua	Ifereimi Rawaqa	Karalaini Naisewa
New South Wales Waratahs	Michael Ruthven	Piper Duck
Queensland Reds	Andrew Fraser	Ivania Wong; Jemma Bemrose
Western Force	Dylan Parsons	Trilleen Pomare

== Ladder ==
Pos	Team	Pld	W	D	L	PF	PA	PD	TB	LB	Pts	Qualification
1	New South Wales Waratahs	4	3	0	1	115	81	+34	2	1	15	Advance to Finals
2	Queensland Reds	4	3	0	1	109	87	+22	1	0	13	Advance to Finals
3	Fijiana Drua	4	2	0	2	94	101	−7	0	1	9	Advance to Finals
4	Western Force	4	1	1	2	107	133	−26	0	1	7	Advance to Finals
5	ACT Brumbies	4	0	1	3	89	112	−23	0	2	4	

Source: Super Rugby Women's
Rules for classification: Tiebreakers for teams tied on points: 1) Number of matches won; 2) Head-to-head record; 3) Difference between points for and against; 4) Total number of points for.

== Matches ==
=== Round 1 ===
28 February
17:05 AEDT (UTC+11)

(1 BP) New South Wales Waratahs	17–23	Fijiana Drua
Try: Stewart 12' m O'Gorman 42' m Friedrichs 79' c Con: Friedrichs (0/2); Barker (1/1) 80'	Report	Try: Naikore 1' c Tuikilakila 28' c Con: Tisolo (2/2) 1', 29'; Pen: Tisolo (3/3) 10', 25', 72'; Vueti (0/1)

Sydney Football Stadium

1 March
14:05 AWST (UTC+8)

Western Force	29–29	ACT Brumbies
Try: Stephens 5' c Smith 10' c Buleki 55' m Treherne 79' c Con: Freeman (2/3) 5', 10'; Ledington (1/1) 79'; Pen: Ledington (1/1) 29'	Report	Try: Paraone 3' c Dawa 15' m Enyi (2) 31' c, 34' c Con: Moleka (3/4) 3', 31', 34'; Pen: Moleka (1/2) 68'

Perth Rectangular Stadium

Bye/s: Queensland Reds

=== Round 2 ===
8 March
13:05 FJT (UTC+12)

(1 BP) Fijiana Drua	19–22	Queensland Reds
Try: Senivutu 67' m Naisewa 72' c Penalty try 77'; Con: Tisolo (1/2) 73'	Report	Try: Bemrose 4' c Kreis 17' c Urwin 56' m Con: Dallinger (2/3) 5', 18'; Pen: Dallinger (1/1) 42'

Churchill Park

8 March
17:05 AEDT (UTC+11)

New South Wales Waratahs	26–21	Western Force (1 BP)
Try: Miller (2) 4' m, 34' c Nathan 70' c Talakai 79' c Con: McKenzie (3/4) 35', 71', 80'	Report	Try: Marsters 13' c Stephens 27' c Smith 64' c Con: Freeman (2/2) 14', 28'; Ledington (1/1) 65'

Sydney Football Stadium

Bye/s: ACT Brumbies

=== Round 3 ===
15 March
15:35 FJT (UTC+12)

Fijiana Drua	21–15	ACT Brumbies (1 BP)
Try: Matarugu 44' c Naikore 65' c Nabuli 84' c Con: Naikore (1/1) 45'; Tisolo (2/2) 66', 86'	Report	Try: Dawa 7' m Palu 50' c Con: Ryan (1/2) 51'; Pen: Moleka (1/1) 72'

Churchill Park

16 March
14:05 AEST (UTC+10)

Queensland Reds	14–36	New South Wales Waratahs (1 BP)
Try: Henwood 6' c Urwin 33' c Con: Cramer (2/2) 7', 34'	Report	Try: Talakai (2) 13' c, 50' c Stewart (2) 16' c, 69' m Friedrichs 27' m Kilisimasi 59' m Con: McKenzie (3/6) 14', 17', 50'

Ballymore Stadium

Bye/s: Western Force

=== Round 4 ===
22 March
13:05 AEDT (UTC+11)

ACT Brumbies	22–26	Queensland Reds
Try: Enyi 14'm Dawa 80'm Pen: Moleka (4/4) 6', 26', 26', 60'	Report	Try: Manera 12'c Karpani 14'm Flynn 36'c Molloy 37'c Con: Cramer (3/) 12', 37', 37'

Viking Park

23 March
16:50 AWST (UTC+8)

Western Force	47–31	Fijiana Drua
Try: Naiqama 12'; Jones 16'; Tapsell 21'; Buleki 32'; Pomare 34'; Freeman 56'; Penalty Try 71'; Con: Freeman (5/6) 13', 17', 22', 35', 57'	Report	Try: Naisewa (2) 4', 25'; Korovata 46'; Nakoci 58'; Adivitaloga 73'; Con: Tisolo (2/3) 5', 26'; Naikore (1/2) 59'

Perth Rectangular Stadium

Bye/s: New South Wales Waratahs

=== Round 5 ===
28 March
17:05 AEDT (UTC+11)

ACT Brumbies	23–36	New South Wales Waratahs
Try: Bone 24'; Mae 30'; Dawa 66'; Con: Paraone (1/1) 67'; Pen: Moleka (1/1) 7'; Ryan (1/1) 43'	Report	Try: Codey 18'; Pohiva (2) 27', 50'; Duck (2) 40', 74'; Stewart 79'; Con: McKenzie (3/6) 19', 28', 51'

Canberra Stadium

30 March
13:05 AEDT (UTC+10)

Queensland Reds	47–10	Western Force
Try: Teutau 10'c Molloy 15'c Hanna 21'c Karpani (3) 33'c, 40'c, 60'm Sauaso 38'c Con: Cramer (6/7) 11', 16', 21', 34', 39', 41'	Report	Try: Buleki 28'; Con: Ledington (1/1) 29'; Pen: Ledington (1/1) 3'

Ballymore Stadium

Bye/s: Fijiana Drua

== Finals ==
Semi-finals
6 April – Ballymore Stadium
Queensland Reds	54
Fijiana Drua	40
6 April – Leichhardt Oval
New South Wales Waratahs	54
Western Force	17

Grand Final
12 April – North Sydney
New South Wales Waratahs	43
Queensland Reds	21

=== Semi-finals ===
6 April

Queensland Reds	54–40	Fijiana Drua
Try: Kreis 4'c Bemrose 13'c Molloy 20'c Sauaso 25'c Penalty Try 30'; Karpani (2) 35'c, 63'm Jacoby 74'c Con: Cramer (6/7) 5', 15', 22', 26', 36', 75'	Report	Try: Fisher 11'm Nakesa 48'c Naisewa (2) 53'c, 67'c Railumu 60'c Naikore 70'c Con: Naikore (3/3) 61', 67', 71'; Tisolo (2/3) 49', 54'

Ballymore Stadium

6 April

New South Wales Waratahs	54–17	Western Force
Try: Duck 4'c Stewart (2) 9'm, 14'c Friedrichs (3) 48'c, 60'c, 71'c Penalty Try 65'; Halse 67'c Con: McKenzie (6/7) 5', 15', 49', 61', 68', 72'	Report	Try: Pomare 19'c Smith 44'm Ebbage 80'm Con: Ledington (1/3) 20'

Leichhardt Oval

=== Grand Final ===
12 April
14:35 AEST (UTC+10)

New South Wales Waratahs	43–21	Queensland Reds
Try: Friedrichs (2) 8'c, 75'c Leaney 20'm Pohiva 36'c Miller 60'c Robinson 68'c Con: McKenzie (5/6) 9', 37', 61', 69', 76'; Pen: McKenzie 54'	Report	Try: Karpani 27'c Morgan 47'c Taufua 63'c Con: Cramer (3/3) 28', 48', 64'

North Sydney Oval
Referee: Ella Goldsmith

LP	1	(Australia) Bridie O'Gorman
HK	2	(Australia) Adiana Talakai
TP	3	(Australia) Faliki Pohiva
LL	4	(Australia) Kaitlan Leaney
RL	5	(Australia) Annabelle Codey
BF	6	(Australia) Nicole Nathan
OF	7	(Australia) Emily Chancellor (c)
N8	8	(Australia) Ruby Anderson
SH	9	(Australia) Tatum Bird
FH	10	(Australia) Arabella McKenzie
LW	11	(Australia) Desirée Miller
IC	12	(Australia) Katrina Barker
OC	13	(Australia) Georgina Friedrichs (vc)
RW	14	(Australia) Maya Stewart
FB	15	(Australia) Caitlyn Halse
Replacements:
HK	16	(Australia) Millie Parker
PR	17	(Australia) Emily Robinson
PR	18	(Australia) Seneti Kilisimasi
LK	19	(Australia) Jayjay Taylor
LF	20	(Australia) Anahera Hamahona
SH	21	(Australia) Martha Harvey
BK	22	(Australia) Jade Sheridan
BK	23	(Australia) Waiaria Ellis
Coach:
(Australia) Michael Ruthven

LP	1	(Australia) Bree-Anna Browne
HK	2	(Australia) Tiarna Molloy
TP	3	(Australia) Eva Karpani
LL	4	(Australia) Tiarah Minns
RL	5	(Australia) Vineta Teutau
BF	6	(Australia) Zoe Hanna
OF	7	(Canada) Carola Kreis
N8	8	(Australia) Maraea Tupai
SH	9	(Australia) Layne Morgan
FH	10	(Australia) Lori Cramer (cc)
LW	11	(Australia) Ivania Wong (cc)
IC	12	(Australia) Shalom Sauaso
OC	13	(Australia) Faythe Manera
RW	14	(Australia) Caitlin Urwin
FB	15	(Australia) Charlotte Caslick
Replacements:
HK	16	(Australia) Zophronia Setu
PR	17	(New Zealand) Cristo Taufua
PR	18	(United States) Charli Jacoby
LK	19	(Australia) Deni Ross
LF	20	(Australia) Dillyn Blackburn
SH	21	(Australia) Natalie Wright
FH	22	(Australia) Carys Dallinger
OB	23	(Australia) Piper Flynn
Coach:
(Australia) Andrew Fraser

Assistant referees:
Dan Andrew (Australia)
Harry Fenton (Australia)

TMO:
Cholmondeley Johnson (Australia)

== Players ==
=== Squads ===
Super Rugby Women's Squads named for 2025 season.

ACT Brumbies Women squad
Forwards	Katalina Amosa • Lily Bone • Chioma Enyi • Ashley Fernandez • Sally Fuesaina • Jess Grant • Ella Hopper • Lydia Kavoa • Iroha Kishimoto • Edwina Munns-Cook • Tania Naden • Siokapesi Palu (c) • Piper Rankmore • Keia Mae Sagapolu Sanele • Easter Savelio • Hannah Stewart • Tabua Tuinakauvadra
Backs	Ashlea Bishop • Bonnie Brewer • Charlie Brigstocke • Biola Dawa • Martha Fua • Demi Hayes • Tia Hinds • Jay Huriwai • Harmony Ioane • Kyah Little • Faitala Moleka • Manua Moleka • Ana Naimasi • Merania Paraone • Gabrielle Petersen • Ella Ryan • Bienne Terita
Coach	Andy Friend

Fijian Drua Women squad
Forwards	Nunia Daunimoala • Raijeli Daveua • Alfreda Fisher • Anasimeci Korovata • Isabella Koi • Keleni Marawa • Vika Matarugu • Salanieta Nabuli • Karalaini Naisewa • Mereoni Nakesa • Merevesi Ofakimalino • Tiana Robanakadavu • Loraini Senivutu • Asinate Serevi • Bitila Tawake • Carletta Yee
Backs	Ema Adivitaloga • Noelani Baselala • Salanieta Kinita • Kolora Lomani • Rusila Nagasau • Imeri Nai • Vitalina Naikore • Merewairita Naivosa • Alowesi Nakoci • Josifini Neihamu • Setaita Railumu • Evivi Senikarivi • Luisa Tisolo • Repeka Tove
Coach	Ifereimi Rawaqa

NSW Waratahs Women squad
Forwards	Ruby Anderson • Emily Chancellor • Georgia Chapple • Annabelle Codey • Piper Duck • Seneti Kilisimasi • Atasi Lafai • Kaitlan Leaney • Brittany Merlo • Tahlia Morgan • Leilani Nathan • Bridie O'Gorman • Millie Parker • Faliki Pohiva • Emily Robinson • Adiana Talakai • JayJay Taylor • Siusiuoslafi Volkman
Backs	Katrina Barker • Tatum Bird • Tiarne Cavanagh • Waiaria Ellis • Georgina Friedrichs • Caitlyn Halse • Martha Harvey • Arabella McKenzie • Desirée Miller • Nicole Nathan • Sariah Paki • Jade Sheridan • Maya Stewart • Amelia Whitaker • Jacinta Windsor
Coach	Michael Ruthven

Queensland Reds Women squad
Forwards	Jemma Bemrose • Dillyn Blackburn • Bree-Anna Browne • Sky-Yvette Faimalie • Zoe Hanna • Charli Jacoby • Eva Karpeni • Carola Kreis • Tiarah Minns • Tiarna Molloy • Isabella Nasser • Sarah Riordan • Deni Ross • Jiowana Sauto • Zophronia Setu • Cristo Taufua • Vineta Teutau • Maraea Tupai
Backs	Charlotte Caslick • Lori Cramer • Michelle Curry • Carys Dallinger • Briana Dascombe • Sarah Dougherty • Piper Flynn • Kahli Henwood • Ariana Hira • Maddison Levi • Teagan Levi • Faythe Manera • Layne Morgan • Renae Nona • Shalom Sauaso • Caitlin Urwin • Melanie Wilks • Ivania Wong • Natalie Wright
Coach	Andrew Fraser

Western Force Women squad
Forwards	Nami Dickson • Rosie Ebbage • Zoe Elliot • Tamika Jones • Michaela Leonard • Loretta Mailangi • Hera-Barb Malcolm Heke • Ashley Marsters • Sera Naiqama • Alapeta Ngauamo • Hannah Palelei • Allana Sikimeti • Anneka Stephens • Megumi Takagi • Pia Tapsell • Libya Teepa • Braxton Walker • Taylor Waterson
Backs	Adi Vani Buleki • Georgia Cormick • Hailey Derera • Grace Freeman • Haylee Hifo • Sheree Hume • Nicole Ledington • Ngamihi Monk • Trilleen Pomare • Cecilia Smith • Brooklyn Teki-Joyce • Samantha Treherne • Samantha Wood • Mio Yamanaka
Coach	Dylan Parsons

== See also ==
- 2025 Super Rugby Aupiki season
- 2025 Super Rugby Pacific season
- 2025 Women's Super Rugby Champions final
