= Mia-Rae Clifford =

Australian rules footballer (born 1986)

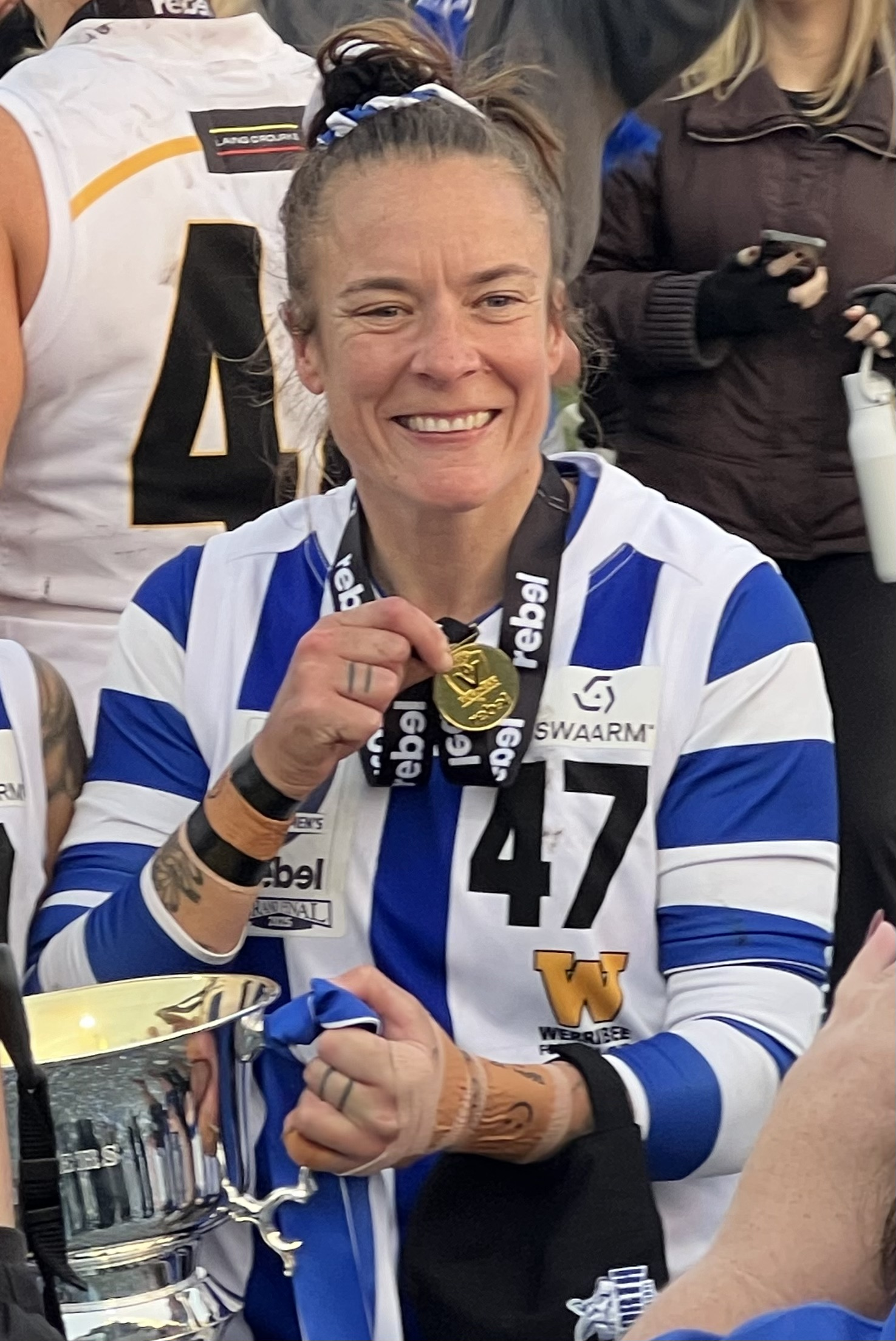
- Clifford in August 2025

Personal information
- Born: 10 August 1986 (age 40)
- Original team: St Kilda Sharks (VFL Women's)
- Draft: No. 89, 2016 AFL Women's draft
- Debut: Round 1, 2017, Melbourne vs. Brisbane, at Casey Fields
- Height: 170 cm (5 ft 7 in)
- Position: Defender

Playing career^{1}
Years	Club	Games (Goals)
2017	Melbourne	7 (0)
2019	Geelong	8 (6)
2020	Fremantle	3 (2)
Total		18 (8)
- ^{1} Playing statistics correct to the end of the 2020 season.

Career highlights
- Geelong leading goalkicker: 2019

Mia-Rae Clifford (born 10 August 1986) is an Australian rules footballer and rugby union player. She played for Melbourne, Geelong, and Fremantle in the AFL Women's competition. She currently plays for the Melbourne Rebels in the Super W competition.

== Australian football career ==
=== AFLW ===
==== Melbourne ====
Clifford was drafted by Melbourne with their twelfth selection and eighty-ninth overall in the 2016 AFL Women's draft. She made her debut in the fifteen point loss to Brisbane at Casey Fields in the opening round of the 2017 season. She played every match in her debut season to finish with seven games. She was not retained on Melbourne's list at the end of the season and was subsequently delisted in May 2017.

==== Geelong ====
In August 2018, Clifford joined AFLW expansion club, Geelong. In April 2019, Clifford was delisted by Geelong.

==== Fremantle ====
In April 2019, Clifford was signed as a delisted free agent by Fremantle. In August 2020, she was delisted by Fremantle.

=== VFLW ===
==== Essendon ====
In November 2020, Clifford was signed by Essendon Football Club as a member of their women's VFLW team. Clifford was named as the leading goal kicker for the 2021 season. At the beginning of the 2022 season, Clifford was promoted to the role of Co-Captain alongside Georgia Nanscawen. The pair went on to lead the team, alongside Head Coach Brendan Major, to an undefeated season, finishing as Major Premiers in the 2022 Rebel VFLW Grand Final at Port Melbourne ETU Stadium in July 2022.

== Rugby career ==
Clifford joined the Melbourne Rebels for the 2023 Super W season.

== Personal life ==
As of 2017, Clifford was engaged to Collingwood's Penny Cula-Reid. The pair have been referred to as the first openly gay couple in the league.
