= Andy Friend =

Australian rugby union player

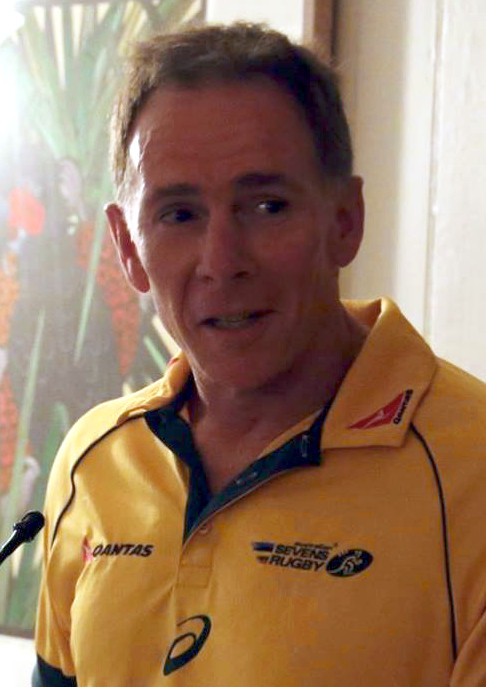
- Full name: Andrew Friend
- Born: 24 April 1969 (age 57) Canberra, Australian Capital Territory, Australia

Rugby union career
- Position: Fullback
Provincial / State sides
Years	Team	Apps	(Points)
1989–1991	Australian Capital Territory		
International career
Years	Team	Apps	(Points)
1986–1987	Australian Schoolboys		
Coaching career
- Years: Team
- 2005–2008: Harlequins
- 2008–2011: Brumbies
- 2012–2014: Yokohama Canon Eagles
- 2014–2016: Suntory Sungoliath
- 2016–2018: Australia 7s
- 2018–2023: Connacht
- 2025: ACT Brumbies Women

Andrew Friend (born 24 April 1969) is an Australian rugby union coach and former player. Friend has previously worked as the ACT Brumbies Women in the Super Rugby Women's competition, the Director of Rugby for Irish province Connacht between 2018 and 2023 and was head coach of the Australia Sevens team, the Brumbies in Super Rugby, English club Harlequins, and the Yokohama Canon Eagles and Suntory Sungoliath in the Japanese Top League.

== Career ==
Friend was selected in the Australia Schoolboys rugby team for 1986–87 before going on to play provincial rugby for the ACT Kookaburras. His position of choice was full-back.

== Coaching career ==
Friend began his coaching career within an Australian Institute of Sport (AIS) rugby program in 1995. He held assistant coaching positions at the New South Wales Waratahs and the Brumbies. He was also the Brumbies skills coach under Eddie Jones.

Friend guided the Australian Under-21 team to the final of the 2005 World Championships. He worked within the Wallabies setup for the 2002 Tri Nations Series and 2003 Rugby World Cup.

In the summer of 2005, Friend joined English Premiership team Harlequins as head coach. Following the conclusion of the 2007-08 season, he signed a three-year contract with the Canberra-based Brumbies side.

He took over from Laurie Fisher as head coach at the Super Rugby club. After completing two full seasons in charge, Friend has his contract terminated in March 2011 following a loss to the Melbourne Rebels and rumours of player discontent. He was the third coach to either be fired or not have their contract renewed by the ACT Brumbies board. After helping out as a trainer for various Canberra high school teams, Friend went to Japan in 2012 and became the head coach at Canon Eagles for two seasons. He was head coach of Suntory Sungoliath from 2014 to 2016.

Friend was appointed head coach of the Australian Sevens team in 2016.

Friend was appointed as the head coach of Pro14 side Connacht on a three-year deal in May 2018. In December 2022, Friend decided to leave Connacht at the end of his contract at the conclusion of the 2022–23 season.

Inaugural inductee to University of Canberra Sport Walk of Fame in 2022.

In September 2024, Friend was appointed head coach of the ACT Brumbies Women in the Super Rugby Women's competition ahead of their 2025 season. The Brumbies finished last on the 2025 season ladder. Friend was coach until April 2025, and was succeeded by James Erwin.

== Charity bike ride ==
Following an accident in 2010 when his wife, Kerri Rawlings, came off her bike and suffered a serious brain injury, Andy Friend undertook a 5000 km journey from Cooktown to Canberra to raise awareness and money for Acquired Brain Injury. This was to support Brain Injury Australia and Outward Bound. The journey was successful, with his wife as part of the support crew, and was completed in late November 2011.
