= Keia Mae Sagapolu =

American rugby union player (born 2000)

- Born: 12 May 2000 (age 26) Tacoma, Washington, U.S.
- Height: 168 cm (5 ft 6 in)

Rugby union career
- Position: Prop
Senior career
Years	Team	Apps	(Points)
2023–2025	Leicester Tigers	19	(5)
2025–	Loughborough Lightning		
Super Rugby
Years	Team	Apps	(Points)
2025	ACT Brumbies		
International career
Years	Team	Apps	(Points)
2023–	United States	23	(10)

Keia Mae Sagapolu (born 12 May 2000) is an American rugby union player. She plays Prop for the Loughborough Lightning in the Premiership Women's Rugby competition and for the United States internationally. She competed for the Eagles in the 2025 Women's Rugby World Cup.

== Rugby career ==
Sagapolu was born in Tacoma, Washington. She discovered rugby during her senior year of high school. She studied communication at Central Washington University, whose rugby team plays in the first division. She also played with the Tacoma Tsunami club.

In 2023, she made her international debut for the United States against Spain. She then joined Leicester Tigers for the 2023–24 Premiership Women's Rugby season.

In 2024, she was called up to the United States team to play in the Pacific Four Series. She had accumulated eleven caps for the Eagles by the end of summer 2024 when she was selected for the WXV 1 tournament in Canada.

In January, she joined Australian club, Brumbies, for the 2025 Super Rugby Women's season. She was selected for the Eagles to play in the Pacific Four Series in March.

In June, she signed with the Loughborough Lightning. She was subsequently named in the Eagles squad for the Women's Rugby World Cup in England.
