= Sylvia Braaten =

American rugby union player

- Born: July 5, 1985 (age 41)
- Height: 1.72 m (5 ft 7 1/2 in)
- Weight: 70 kg (150 lb; 11 st 0 lb)

Rugby union career
- Position: Centre
International career
Years	Team	Apps	(Points)
2011–2019	United States	14	(0)
Coaching career
- Years: Team
- 2025–: Twin Cities Gemini (Head Coach)

Sylvia Braaten (born July 5, 1985) is an American rugby union coach and former player. She competed for the United States at the 2014 and 2017 Women's Rugby World Cup's.

== Early career ==
Braaten played basketball, tennis and soccer in high school. She graduated from Marquette University where she discovered rugby. She represented the United States development teams in the under-19s and under-23s.

== Rugby career ==
Braaten made her debut for the United States in 2011. She was a member of the Eagles squad that participated at the 2014 Rugby World Cup in France.

In 2016, She was part of The Serevi Selects team that played at the Bayleys Coral Coast 7s tournament in Fiji. Later that year she was signed by BiPro as the brand's fifth professional rugby player. She is a Certified Strength and Conditioning Specialist.

Braaten was named in the Eagles squad for the 2017 Rugby World Cup in Ireland. She was cited for contact with the eye area in the Eagles pool match against England at the World Cup.

=== Coaching ===
She was appointed as the Assistant Coach, and the Strength and Conditioning Coach for the U.S. Women's Under-20s side in 2019. In 2025, she was announced as the Head Coach for the Twin Cities Gemini for the inaugural season of the Women's Elite Rugby competition.
