= ACT Brumbies Women =

- Union: Rugby Australia; ACT and Southern NSW
- Founded: 2017; 9 years ago
- Location: Canberra, ACT, Australia
- Region: Australian Capital Territory, Southern New South Wales
- Coach: Andy Friend
- Captain: Siokapesi Palu
- League: Super Rugby Women's
- 2025: 5th overall
| 1st kit | 2nd kit |

Official website
- www.brumbies.com.au

The ACT Brumbies Women are an Australian rugby union team based in Canberra, Australian Capital Territory (ACT). The team competes in the annual Super W competition. They have competed in every edition since Rugby Australia announced that a national women's rugby competition would be launched in 2018.

== History ==
The Brumbies only managed one win against the Melbourne Rebels during the inaugural season of Super W in 2018.

In 2019 there was a change to the finals format with an additional playoff match added for the teams which finished second and third during the regular season. The Brumbies finished the regular season in third place and played in the playoffs against Queensland, but they were defeated 10–39.

The Brumbies completed the 2020 Super W season in third place after the playoff and final was cancelled due to the COVID-19 pandemic.

In September 2024, Andy Friend was announced as the new Head Coach for the Super Rugby Women's 2025 season.

== Current squad ==
On 29 January 2025, the squad for the 2025 season was announced.

ACT Brumbies Super Rugby Women's squad
| **Props**: (Australia) **Sally Fuesaina**; (United States) **Keia Mae Sagapolu Sanele**; (Japan) Iroha Kishimoto; (Australia) Hannah Stewart; **Hookers**: (Australia) **Tania Naden**; (Australia) **Katalina Amosa**; (Australia) Ella Hopper; **Locks**: (Australia) **Ashley Fernandez**; (Samoa) **Easter Savelio**; (Australia) Jess Grant; (Australia) Lily Bone | **Loose forwards**: (Australia) **Siokapesi Palu** (c); (Australia) **Lydia Kavoa**; (Australia) **Tabua Tuinakauvadra**; (Australia) Chioma Enyi; (Australia) Edwina Munns-Cook; (Australia) Piper Rankmore; **Scrum-halves**: (Australia) Ella Ryan; (Australia) Bonnie Brewer; (Australia) **Jay Huriwai**; **Fly-halves**: (Australia) **Faitala Moleka**; (Australia) Manua Moleka | **Centres**: (Australia) Merania Paraone; (Australia) Harmony Ioane; (Australia) **Bienne Terita**; (Australia) **Martha Fua**; **Outside backs**: (Australia) **Biola Dawa**; (Australia) Ashlea Bishop; (Fiji) **Ana Naimasi**; (Australia) Gabrielle Petersen; (Australia) Kyah Little; (Australia) Charlie Brigstocke; (Australia) Demi Hayes; (Australia) **Tia Hinds** |
(c) Denotes team captain, **Bold** denotes internationally capped and ^{ST} indicated short-term cover.

== Season standings ==
Super Rugby Women's

| Year | Pos | Pld | W | D | L | F | A | +/- | BP | Pts | Play-offs |
|---|---|---|---|---|---|---|---|---|---|---|---|
| 2025 | 5th | 4 | 0 | 1 | 3 | 89 | 112 | −23 | 2 | 4 | Did not compete |
| 2024 | 4th | 5 | 2 | 0 | 3 | 108 | 139 | −31 | 2 | 10 | Lost to New South Wales in playoff |
| 2023 | 3rd | 5 | 2 | 0 | 3 | 105 | 106 | –1 | 0 | 10 | Lost to Queensland in playoff |
| 2022 | 4th | 5 | 1 | 1 | 3 | 78 | 99 | –21 | 0 | 8 | Did not compete |
| 2021 | 3rd, Pool A | 3 | 1 | 0 | 2 | 46 | 48 | –2 | 2 | 6 | Lost to Melbourne in playoff |
| 2020 | 3rd | 4 | 2 | 0 | 2 | 74 | 97 | −23 | 1 | 9 | Lost to Queensland in playoff |
| 2019 | 3rd | 4 | 2 | 0 | 2 | 86 | 50 | +36 | 1 | 9 | Lost to Queensland in playoff |
| 2018 | 4th | 4 | 1 | 0 | 3 | 57 | 103 | –46 | 1 | 5 | Did not competeReferences |
