= Kahli Henwood =

Australian rugby union player (born 1999)

- Born: 1 October 1999 (age 27)
- Height: 172 cm (5 ft 8 in)
- Weight: 74 kg (163 lb; 11 st 9 lb)

Rugby union career
- Position: Wing
Super Rugby
Years	Team	Apps	(Points)
2025–	Queensland Reds	2	(5)
National sevens team
Years	Team		Comps
2024–	Australia		18 Apps (10 pts)

Kahli Henwood (born 1 October 1999) is an Australian rugby union and sevens player. She played for Australia Sevens at the 2024 Summer Olympics.

== Early life ==
She attended Griffith University in Queensland with whom she played University Rugby Sevens.

== Rugby career ==
In January 2022, she was named as co-captain of the Queensland Reds women's sevens team at the Next Gen 7s.

She was an travelling reserve for the 2024 Summer Olympics. She made her international debut for Australia Sevens on 28 July 2024 at the Games, against Great Britain, appearing as an injury replacement for Kaitlin Shave.

In October 2024 she played for Queensland Reds in the Next Gen Sevens. In November 2024, she made her debut in the 2024-25 SVNS series at the Dubai Sevens. In December 2024, she was one of a number of Australia Sevens players who committed their intentions to play Super Rugby Women's in 2025, with Henwood committing to the Queensland Reds. In May 2025, she was nominated for Women's Rookie of the Year for 2024-25. She continued with the Australia sevens team for the 2025-26 season. In October 2026, she signed a contract with the Australian Rugby Sevens team until the 2028 Olympic Games.
