= Faitala Moleka =

Australia international rugby union player

- Born: 29 January 2005 (age 21) Sydney
- Height: 170 cm (5 ft 7 in)

Rugby union career
- Position(s): Fly Half, Fullback
Super Rugby
Years	Team	Apps	(Points)
2023–Present	Brumbies	5	(35)
International career
Years	Team	Apps	(Points)
2023–Present	Australia	26	(58)

Faitala Moleka (born 29 January 2005) is an Australian rugby union player. She competes for Australia internationally and for the ACT Brumbies in the Super Rugby Women's competition.

== Personal life ==
Moleka is one of eight siblings, her younger sister Manu'a also plays for the ACT Brumbies and was called into the Wallaroos extended squad ahead of their test against Fiji in 2025.

== Rugby career ==
In December 2022, Moleka represented New South Wales Under 17 Girls in a sevens competition that was organised by Rugby Australia.

Moleka played in the Brumbies Super W trial game against the Melbourne Rebels, she converted her own try in her sides 36–12 win. She debuted for the Brumbies against the Fijiana Drua in their opening match of the 2023 Super W season. She switched to fullback in their round three clash with the Queensland Reds after debuting at fly-half.

In round four of Super W, she kicked a penalty in the 76th minute to help her side edge the Melbourne Rebels in their 30–23 win. Moleka scored a try and made six successful conversions in the final round match against the Western Force, the Brumbies triumphed 45–27. Her side met the Queensland Reds again in the semifinals, they narrowly lost 20–23.

Moleka made her test debut for the Wallaroos against Fiji on 20 May 2023 at the Allianz Stadium.

In 2025, she was called into the Wallaroos side for the Women's Rugby World Cup in England.
