= Bree-Anna Browne =

Australia international rugby union player

- Born: 29 March 1997 (age 29) Toowoomba, QLD
- Height: 1.73 m (5 ft 8 in)
- Weight: 98 kg (216 lb)

Rugby union career
- Position: Prop
Super Rugby
Years	Team	Apps	(Points)
2019	Rebels		(0)
2020–Present	Queensland Reds		(0)
International career
Years	Team	Apps	(Points)
2022–Present	Australia	13	(0)

Bree-Anna Browne (née Cheatham; born 29 March 1997) is an Australian rugby union player. She plays for Australia at an international level, and for the Queensland Reds in the Super Rugby Women's competition. She has competed for Australia at the 2021 and 2025 Women's Rugby World Cups.

== Early career ==
Browne first started playing Rugby League with the Atherton Roosters U-6 Team in 2005. She moved to Brisbane and played Oztag until her senior year in High School. She played 7s for St Joseph's College.

At 16 years she played for Western Districts Rugby Football club, Senior Women's team in 2013–14. She returned to Wests in 2016 and captained the side in their last Grand Final appearance in 2019.

At 17 She joined the Australian Army and at her first ADF Rugby Championship represented the Army in a clean sweep. It was her first player of the Tournament Award (Twice). From then, she has been a regular selection in the ADF Team, and has toured Tonga, Fiji, New Zealand and the UK. For the 2025 season, she joined Brothers Rugby Club.

== Rugby career ==
Browne was a member of the victorious Super 10s team which beat NSW in the final at Suncorp in 2018. She joined the Rebels in 2019, and then later represented Australia A in the 2019 Oceania Rugby Women's Championship in Fiji.

She joined the Queensland Reds in 2020, she played in two Super W finals and won best Queensland Reds forward in 2022. She was named in Australia's squad for the 2022 Pacific Four Series in June, but didn't get to run out onto the field. She was later selected for the Wallaroos squad for the Laurie O'Reilly Cup later that year in August.

Browne made her international debut against New Zealand on 20 August 2022 and was named player of the match by her peers. She was subsequently selected in the Wallaroos side for the delayed 2022 Rugby World Cup in New Zealand. However, she didn't get to play in the tournament.

Browne was named on the bench for the Wallaroos opening match against England in the inaugural 2023 WXV 1 clash. She also featured for the side in their victory over Wales, before being ruled out for the entire 2024 season due to injury.

She was a contracted member of the Queensland Reds and the Wallaroos squads in 2025. She represented Australia A once again against Samoa on 28 June in Canberra. In August 2025, she was named in the Australian squad for the 2025 Women's Rugby World Cup by head coach Jo Yapp.
