= Melanie Wilks =

- Born: 13 January 2000 (age 26)
- Height: 173 cm (5 ft 8 in)
- Weight: 75 kg (165 lb; 11 st 11 lb)

Rugby union career
- Position(s): Centre, Wing
Super Rugby
Years	Team	Apps	(Points)
- Queensland Reds
International career
Years	Team	Apps	(Points)
2023–	Australia	1	(0)

Melanie Louise Wilks (born 2000) is an Australian rugby union player. She represents Australia internationally and plays for the Queensland Reds in the Super Rugby Women's competition.

== Early life and career ==
Wilks grew up in Elimbah. She graduated from Beerwah State High School in 2017. She is an Australian youth touch representative.

She was scouted at her former touch rugby club during a fitness session. She had never played rugby before joining Bond University's women's rugby team in 2018. She has won consecutive Queensland Premier Women’s titles with Bond University.

== Rugby career ==
In May 2022, she was named in the Wallaroos squad for a two-test series against Japan, and Fiji. She has been involved with the Wallaroos for several years and has been a part of some touring sides but never got the opportunity to play.

She has represented Queensland Reds in fifteens and sevens.

In the fall of 2023, she was called up to the Australian side for the inaugural WXV 1 tournament in New Zealand. She was named on the bench for the match against France, she was to make her test debut for the Wallaroos.
