= Demi Hayes =

Australian rugby union player

- Born: May 25, 1998 (age 28) Mount Isa, Qld, Australia
- Height: 1.75 m (5 ft 9 in)
- Weight: 63 kg (139 lb)
- Notable relative: Simon Kennewell (husband)

Rugby union career
Super Rugby
Years	Team	Apps	(Points)
2025	ACT Brumbies		(0)
National sevens team
Years	Team		Comps
2016-Present	Australia		
Medal record
Women's rugby sevens
Representing Australia
Rugby Sevens World Cup
Gold medal – first place	2022 Cape Town	Team competition
Commonwealth Games
Gold medal – first place	2022 Birmingham	Team competition

Demi Hayes (born 25 May 1998) is an Australian rugby sevens player.

== Career ==
Hayes also plays touch rugby. She competed at the 2015 Commonwealth Youth Games and won gold. She made her debut for Australia at the 2016 Canada Women's Sevens against Brazil.

Hayes was named in the Australian squad for the Rugby sevens at the 2020 Summer Olympics. The team came second in the pool round but then lost to Fiji 14-12 in the quarterfinals.

Hayes won a gold medal with the Australian sevens team at the 2022 Commonwealth Games in Birmingham. She was a member of the Australian team that won the 2022 Sevens Rugby World Cup held in Cape Town, South Africa in September 2022.

Following issues with injury, she returned to the Australian Sevens team for the 2024-25 SVNS series.

In December 2024, she was one of a number of Australia Sevens players who committed their intentions to play Super Rugby Women's in 2025 with Hayes committing to the ACT Brumbies.

== Personal life ==
Her partner Simon Kennewell has also played rugby sevens for Australia. The two married on October 4, 2025.
