= Sione Fukofuka =

Australian rugby union coach

Rugby union career
Coaching career
- Years: Team
- 2021–2023: Australia (Assistant coach)
- 2023: Queensland Reds (Attack coach)
- 2024–2025: United States (Head coach)
- 2025–2026: Scotland (Head coach)
- 2027–: Wallaroos (Head coach)

Sione Fukofuka is an Australian rugby union coach. He has been appointed as the next coach of the Wallaroos, with his term to begin in 2027.

== Early career ==
Fukofuka taught English and Physical Education at Brisbane State High School for sixteen years.

== Coaching career ==
Fukofuka was the Development coach for the Australian Youth Women's sevens team to the 2015 Commonwealth Youth Games, and for the Australian Men's sevens team in 2019. From 2014 to 2017 he was the Queensland Women's sevens team's Head Coach.

In 2020, he was the Head Coach for the Sunnybank Rugby side in the Queensland Premier Rugby competition. He was the Queensland Reds Women's attack coach. He also served as the Wallaroos assistant coach for three years.

He was appointed Head Coach of the United States women's national rugby union team in 2023.

He left his position in the US after the 2025 RWC and on December 17 of that year he was named Head Coach of the Scotland women's national rugby union team.
