= Jemma Bemrose =

Australian rugby union player

- Born: Gold Coast, Queensland, Australia
- Height: 171 cm (5 ft 7 in)
- School: Elanora State High School
- University: Bond University

Rugby union career
- Position: Flanker
Super Rugby
Years	Team	Apps	(Points)
2024–present	Queensland Reds		
International career
Years	Team	Apps	(Points)
2026-	Australia		

Jemma Bemrose is an Australian rugby union player who plays as a back row forward as a club captain for Queensland Reds Women and Australia.

== Early life ==
From Gold Coast, Queensland, Bemrose started playing rugby after being inspired by the Rugby Sevens played at the 2018 Commonwealth Games. She attended Elanora State High School, graduating in 2020, and later attended Bond University.

== Club career ==
Bemrose made her full Super Rugby Women's debut for Queensland Reds in March 2024, playing 80 minutes at flanker in a tight 32-31 loss to Fijian Drua.

Bemrose was named co-captain of the Queensland Reds alongside Ivania Wong in 2025, setting a new record as the youngest captain of the club at the age of 22 years-old, surpassing the record of Selena Worsley by several months. She continued as captain for the 2026 season.

== International career ==
Bemrose was included in the Australia women's national rugby union team squad ahead of the 2026 WXV, and was named as a replacement for Australia's opening game against England on 12 September, making her debut in the second-half.
