= Tiarah Minns =

- Born: 6 April 2001 (age 25)
- Height: 188 cm (6 ft 2 in)

Rugby union career
- Position: Lock
Super Rugby
Years	Team	Apps	(Points)
2019–2024	Melbourne Rebels		
2025–	Queensland Reds		
International career
Years	Team	Apps	(Points)
2024–	Australia	3	(0)

Tiarah Minns (born 6 April 2001) is an Australian rugby union player. She represents Australia internationally and plays for the Queensland Reds in the Super Rugby Women's competition. She previously played for the Melbourne Rebels.

== Rugby career ==
Minns initially played netball but switched to rugby in 2019, when she joined the University of Melbourne.

In 2019, after her first season with the Melbourne Rebels, she was selected for Australia's representative side to play in the Oceania Championship's in Fiji.

In 2020, on the first day of the Super Rugby Women's competition, she damaged her lateral and posterior ligaments. She underwent surgery and missed the entire season.

At the end of 2022, she tore her anterior cruciate ligaments and had to undergo two surgeries. The staff and players of the men's Rebels team helped in her rehabilitation. She also missed the 2023 season due to the injury.

In early 2024, she was called up to the Wallaroos squad for the Pacific Four Series but had to withdraw due to a shoulder injury. She moved to Sydney and joined the Mermaids, the women's team for Manly RUFC, she played in the Jack Scott Cup final, which they lost to Sydney University FC.

Minns made her international debut for Australia against Ireland in Belfast on September 14. It was a warm-up match ahead of the WXV 2 tournament, her side were defeated 36–10. She was subsequently selected in the Wallaroos squad for the 2024 WXV 2 tournament.

In January 2025, it was announced that she would join the Queensland Reds for the 2025 Super Rugby Women's season.
