= Emerson Allen =

US international rugby union player

- Born: 1 May 1999 (age 27)
- Height: 185 cm (6 ft 1 in)

Rugby union career
- Position: Lock
Senior career
Years	Team	Apps	(Points)
- Life West Gladiatrix
2025–	Twin Cities Gemini		
2025–	Leicester Tigers		
International career
Years	Team	Apps	(Points)
2024–	United States	2	(0)

Emerson Allen (born May 1, 1999) is an American rugby union player. She competed for the United States in the 2025 Women's Rugby World Cup.

== Rugby career ==
Allen played for Life West Gladiatrix in 2024. She made her international debut for the United States against Japan at the end of summer 2024. She also appeared for the Eagles in the WXV 1 tournament held in Canada.

At the beginning of 2025, she joined Twin Cities Gemini for the inaugural season of the Women's Elite Rugby competition. In May, she featured for the Eagles in the Pacific Four Series.

Allen signed with English club, Leicester Tigers ahead of the World Cup. She was subsequently named in the Eagles squad for the 2025 Women's Rugby World Cup in England.
