= Tiarna Molloy =

- Born: 8 November 1998 (age 28)

Rugby union career
- Position: Hooker
Super Rugby
Years	Team	Apps	(Points)
2021 – present	Queensland Reds		(0)
International career
Years	Team	Apps	(Points)
2022–	Australia	6	(0)

Tiarna Molloy (born 8 November 1998) is an Australian rugby union player. She plays for the Queensland Reds in the Super W competition.

Molloy was named in Australia's squad for the 2022 Pacific Four Series in New Zealand. She made her international debut for the Wallaroos against the United States on 12 June in West Auckland.
