= Lori Cramer =

Australian rugby union player (born 1993)

- Born: 8 March 1993 (age 33) Brisbane
- Height: 1.63 m (5 ft 4 in)
- Weight: 67 kg (148 lb)
- School: Kelvin Grove State College, Eatons Hill State School

Rugby union career
- Position(s): Fullback, Wing
Senior career
| Years | Team | Apps | (Points) |
| 2022–Present | Exeter Chiefs | 25 | (42) |
Super Rugby
| Years | Team | Apps | (Points) |
| ?–2022 | NSW Waratahs | | (0) |
| | Queensland Reds | | (0) |
International career
| Years | Team | Apps | (Points) |
| 2019–Present | Australia | 31 | (87) |

Lori Cramer (born 8 March 1993) is an Australian rugby union player. She plays Fullback for the NSW Waratahs in the Super W competition.

== Rugby career ==
=== 2019 ===
Cramer was named in Australia's squad for two two-test series against Japan and then New Zealand. She came off the bench in her international debut on 13 July 2019 in the first test against Japan. She started in the second test match as the Wallaroos won the series with a 46–3 victory.

In August 2019, Cramer started in both matches against the Black Ferns.

=== 2022 ===
Cramer was selected for the Wallaroos squad for test matches against Fiji and Japan in May 2022. She was named in the squad for the 2022 Pacific Four Series. She started against the Black Ferns in the opening match of the Pacific Four series on 6 June.

Cramer was named in the Wallaroos squad for a two-test series against the Black Ferns at the Laurie O'Reilly Cup. She was selected in the team again for the delayed 2022 Rugby World Cup in New Zealand.

Following the Rugby World Cup, she signed with the Exeter Chiefs for the 2022–23 Premier 15s season.

=== 2023–2025 ===
Cramer returned to the Wallaroos side for the 2023 Pacific Four Series, and the O'Reilly Cup. She started in the final two games of the Pacific Series against the United States and Canada.

In 2025, she was named in the Wallaroos side for the Women's Rugby World Cup in England.
