= 2020 Super W season =

Australian women's rugby union season

2020 Super W
- Countries: Australia (5 teams)
- Tournament format(s): Round-robin
- Champions: NSW Waratahs

The 2020 Super W season was the third edition of the women's Super W competition in Australia. The playoff and final were cancelled due to the COVID-19 pandemic, the NSW Waratahs were dubbed champions after an undefeated season.

== Teams ==
Team name	Location
Brumbies Women	Canberra, Australian Capital Territory
NSW Waratahs Women	Sydney, New South Wales
Queensland Women	Brisbane, Queensland
Melbourne Rebels Women	Melbourne Victoria
RugbyWA Women	Perth, Western Australia

== Regular season ==
=== Standings ===
2020 Super W – Regular season
#	Team	P	W	D	L	PF	PA	PD	Pts
1	NSW Waratahs	4	4	0	0	131	21	+110	19
2	Queensland	4	3	0	1	218	33	+185	15
3	Brumbies	4	2	0	2	74	97	−23	9
4	Melbourne Rebels	4	1	0	3	59	188	−129	6
5	RugbyWA	4	0	0	4	41	184	−143	2

=== Results ===
==== Round 1 ====
14 February

Melbourne Rebels	3 − 33	NSW Waratahs Women
	Report

15 February

Brumbies Women	29 − 10	Rugby WA Women
	Report

==== Round 2 ====
22 February

Rugby WA Women	5 − 80	Queensland Reds
	Report

22 February

Melbourne Rebels	22 − 25	Brumbies Women
	Report

==== Round 3 ====
28 February

NSW Waratahs Women	41 − 8	Brumbies Women
	Report

29 February

Queensland Reds	104 − 3	Melbourne Rebels
	Report

==== Round 4 ====
7 March

Queensland Reds	10 − 13	NSW Waratahs Women
	Report

8 March

Rugby WA	26 − 31	Melbourne Rebels
	Report

==== Round 5 ====
14 March

NSW Waratahs Women	44 − 0	Rugby WA Women
	Report

15 March

Brumbies Women	12 − 24	Queensland Reds
	Report

== Finals ==
The NSW Waratahs Women were undefeated in the regular season. They were to host the Final in Sydney after the playoff between Queensland Reds Women and Brumbies Women. The Finals were postponed to late May, but Rugby Australia decided to formally conclude the season due to the COVID-19 pandemic.

== See also ==
- Women's rugby union
