= Ashley Fernandez =

Australia international rugby union player

- Born: 24 October 2002 (age 24)
- Height: 183 cm (6 ft 0 in)
- Weight: 87 kg (192 lb; 13 st 10 lb)

Rugby union career
- Position: Lock
Super Rugby
Years	Team	Apps	(Points)
- ACT Brumbies
International career
Years	Team	Apps	(Points)
2025–	Australia	6	(0)

Ashley Fernandez (born 24 October 2002) is an Australian rugby union player. She competed for Australia at the 2025 Women's Rugby World Cup.

== Rugby career ==
Fernandez plays for the ACT Brumbies in the Super Rugby Women's competition.

She was part of the Wallaroos squad to the 2024 WXV 2 tournament but injured her shoulder during a training session and returned home.

In 2025, she made her international debut for the Wallaroos against Fiji in Suva. She was selected in the Wallaroos side for the Women's Rugby World Cup in England. She featured for Australia in their opening match against Samoa and in their quarterfinal clash with Canada.

In November that year she signed a new one-year national contract with Rugby Australia following the recent Rugby World Cup.

== Personal life ==
Her father, Jaime Fernandez, is an Olympic rower who competed in three Olympic Games and won a silver medal in the Men's eight event at the 2000 Summer Olympics. In 2023, her father was appointed as the Women's High-Performance Manager by Rugby Australia.
