= Biola Dawa =

Australian rugby player (born 2000)

- Born: 5 November 2000 (age 26)
- Height: 1.65 m (5 ft 5 in)

Rugby union career
- Position: Wing
Super Rugby
| Years | Team | Apps | (Points) |
| 2019- | Brumbies | | (0) |
International career
| Years | Team | Apps | (Points) |
| 2024- | Australia | 3 | (0) |

Biola Dawa (born 5 November 2000) is an Australian rugby union player who plays as a wing for ACT Brumbies Women and Australia women's national rugby union team.

== Early life ==
Her parents Agnes and Samson were farmers from the South Sudan village of Kajo Keji. They fled from there in the late 1990s during the Sudanese civil War. She was born in a refugee camp in the Ugandan town of Moyo before they met up with family in Wagga. She has siblings Betty, James, Juma, Amos and Emmanuel. She played numerous sports once settled in Wagga, and an early teammate was future fellow Australian rugby union international Piper Duck.

== Club career ==
She began her rugby union career playing for the Wagga Reddies. In 2019, she was selected by ACT Brumbies Women to play in the Super Rugby Women's.

== International career ==
In July 2024, Dawa became the first person of Sudanese heritage to play for Australia in Test rugby, male or female, when she made her debut for the Wallaroos against Fiji in Sydney. She received praise for the start of her international career after her second appearance the following week against New Zealand.
