= Queensland Reds Women =

Australian rugby union team, based in Brisbane, QLD

Queensland Reds
- Full name: Queensland Reds Women
- Unions: Rugby Australia (RA); Queensland Rugby Union (QRU)
- Nickname: Reds
- Founded: 2017; 9 years ago
- Location: Brisbane, Queensland, Australia
- Region: Queensland
- Grounds: Lang Park (Capacity: 52,500); Ballymore Stadium (Capacity: 21,000)
- Chairman: Jeff Miller
- CEO: David Hanham
- Coach: Andrew Fraser
- Top scorer: Lori Cramer (92)
- Most tries: Ivania Wong (14)
- League: Super Rugby Women's
- 2025: Runner-up
Team kit	2nd kit

First match
- Reds 0–18 Waratahs (Brisbane, Queensland; 10 March 2018)

Largest win
- Rebels 0–112 Reds (Box Hill, Victoria; 24 February 2019)

Largest defeat
- Waratahs 46–0 Reds (Sydney, New South Wales; 9 April 2022)

Official website
- reds.rugby/teams/reds-womens
- Current season

The Queensland Reds Women are an Australian women's rugby union team based in Brisbane, Queensland that compete in the annual Super Rugby Women's competition. A female rugby union competition, is considered to be the female equivalent of the Super Rugby, however only holds Australian teams (until 2022). New Zealand holds a similar competition, the Super Rugby Aupiki.

== History ==
Founded in 2017, prior to the first Super Rugby Women's season, the team has played in every edition, and has been one of the most competitive in the competition. They have been in five grand finals since the inaugural season, but missed the semi-finals in 2024.

Grant Anderson was named as Head Coach for the 2024 Super Rugby Women's season, and Cecilia Smith has been named as captain for the side.

On 29 August 2024, Andrew Fraser was named as the sides new Head Coach.

== Current squad ==
On 13 January 2025, the squad for the 2025 Super Rugby Women's season was announced.

Reds Super W squad
**Props**: (Australia) **Bree-Anna Browne**; (Australia) Sky-Yvette Faimalie; (United States) **Charli Jacoby**; (Australia) **Eva Karpeni**; (Fiji) **Jiowana Sauto**; **Hookers**: (Australia) **Tiarna Molloy**; (Australia) Zophronia Setu; (New Zealand) **Cristo Taufua**; **Locks**: (Australia) **Tiarah Minns**; (Australia) Deni Ross; (Australia) Vineta Teutau	**Loose Forwards**: (Australia) Jemma Bemrose (cc); (Australia) Dillyn Blackburn; (Australia) Zoe Hanna; (Canada) **Carola Kreis**; (Australia) Isabella Nasser; (Australia) **Sarah Riordan**; (Australia) Maraea Tupai; **Scrum-halves**: (Australia) **Sarah Dougherty**; (Australia) **Layne Morgan**; (Australia) **Natalie Wright**; **Fly-halves**: (Australia) **Carys Dallinger**; (Australia) Faythe Manera	**Centres**: (Australia) Michelle Curry; (Australia) Briana Dascombe; (Australia) Ariana Hira; (Australia) Teagan Levi; (Australia) Shalom Sauaso; **(Australia)** **Melanie Wilks**; **Outside Backs**: (Australia) Charlotte Caslick; (Australia) **Lori Cramer**; (Australia) Piper Flynn; (Australia) Kahli Henwood; (Australia) Maddison Levi; (Australia) Renae Nona; (Australia) Caitlin Urwin; (Australia) **Ivania Wong** (cc)
(cc) Denotes team co-captains, **Bold** denotes internationally capped, ^{WTS} denotes a player in the wider training squad and ^{ST} indicated short-term cover.

== Season standings ==
Season	Queensland Reds seasons											Top try scorer		Top point scorer		Ref.
Season	Pos	Finals	P	W	L	D	F	A	PD	BP	Pts	Name	Tries	Name	Points	Ref.
2018	2nd	Runners-up	5	3	2	0	147	69	+78	2	14	Alysia Lefau-Fakaosilea	6	Lavinia Gould	35	
2019	2nd	Runners-up	6	4	2	0	208	36	+172	3	15	Alana Elisaia	7	Lori Cramer	54	
2020	2nd	Runners-up (Note: There was no final or finals series in the 2020 season due to the impacts of COVID-19. The leaders on the season standings before the finals were to be played (New South Wales Waratahs) were declared the winners.)	4	3	1	0	218	33	+185	3	15	Courtney Hodder	5	Lori Cramer	38	
2021	2nd	Runners-up	4	2	2	0	109	109	+0	2	10	Kauna Lopa	3	Lucy Lockhart	24	
2022	3rd	Semi-final	5	3	2	0	125	131	−6	2	14	Ivania Wong	5	Ivania Wong	25	
2023	2nd	Runners-up	5	4	0	1	167	77	+90	3	20	6 players	3	Cecilia Smith	69	
2024	6th	—	5	1	0	4	85	136	−51	0	4	Tiarna Molloy	4	Lori Cramer	23	
2025	2nd	Runners-up	4	3	0	1	109	87	+22	1	13					
