= Natalie Wright =

Australia international rugby union player

- Born: 8 September 2002 (age 24)
- Height: 163 cm (5 ft 4 in)
- Weight: 66 kg (146 lb; 10 st 6 lb)

Rugby union career
- Position: Scrum-half
Super Rugby
Years	Team	Apps	(Points)
2021–	Queensland Reds		(0)
International career
Years	Team	Apps	(Points)
2024–	Australia	6	(0)

Natalie Wright (born 8 September 2002) is an Australian rugby union player. She represents Australia internationally and plays for the Queensland Reds in the Super Rugby Women's competition.

== Rugby career ==
Wright represented the University of Queensland in the AON University Sevens tournament. She started on the wing in her Super W and Queensland Reds debut in 2021. She played for Wests Rugby club in 2024.

Wright made her test debut for the Wallaroos against Fiji on 6 July 2024 at Sydney’s Allianz Stadium. Later in September, she got her first start at halfback against Ireland in Belfast. In October that year, she was selected for the Australian side to the WXV 2 tournament in South Africa. She injured her foot before the Wallaroos clash with South Africa and was replaced by Samantha Wood.

In 2025, she came off the bench in the games against the Black Ferns and the United States in the Pacific Four Series.
