= Melbourne Rebels Women =

- Union: Rugby Australia (Victoria)
- Nickname: Rebels
- Founded: 2017
- Disbanded: 2024
- Location: Melbourne, Australia
- Region: Victoria
- Coach: Jason Rogers
- Captain: Ashley Marsters
- League: Super Rugby Women's
- 2024: 5th
1st kit	2nd kit

Official website
- melbournerebels.com

The Melbourne Rebels Women were an Australian rugby union team that competed in the annual Super Rugby Women's competition. The team was formed after Rugby Australia announced that a 15-a-side women's rugby competition would be launched in 2018.

In their seven seasons in the competition, the Rebels won only two matches and finished with a 2–26 win-loss record, as well as one draw. In October 2024, Rugby Australia announced that Melbourne Rebels Women would not compete in the 2025 season and beyond, finding that there was no financially viable option available to sustain the team.

== History ==
The Rebels Women ended the inaugural Super W season without a single win after a 57–0 loss to the NSW Waratahs in the final round; they were also held scoreless in two matches. The 2019 season also ended without a single win for the Rebels as they finished at the bottom of the table. They registered their first Super W win in the 2020 season after beating the Rugby WA team in round four of the regular season. (Note: The Western Force played under the name Rugby WA in 2019 and 2020.)

In 2021, the Rebels did not win any matches during the regular season and were edged by the Brumbies in the playoffs. The 2022 season saw their final round match with the Western Force cancelled due to the COVID-19 pandemic.

=== Financial woes in 2024 ===
The Melbourne Rebels were placed in voluntary administration in January 2024 with over $20 million in debt and reportedly had just $17,300 in the bank. Ten administrative staff and CEO, Baden Stephenson, were made redundant and coaches were given four-month contracts. Rugby Australia's CEO, Phil Waugh, confirmed that the women's contracts would be honoured in the same manner as the Rebels’ male players but was not able to place a time line on any decision about the club's existence beyond 2024.

Ashley Marsters was named as the Rebels Women's captain for the 2024 Super Rugby Women's season.

On 2 October 2024, Rugby Australia confirmed that the Melbourne Rebels will not compete in the Super Rugby Women's competition in 2025, with Rugby Australia stating that an investigation into the viability of maintaining the Rebels women's program did not identify a financially viable option for either Rugby Australia or Rugby Victoria to sustain the program in 2025.

== Recent squad ==
On 20 February, the squad for the 2024 Super Rugby Women's season was announced.

Rebels Super W squad
**Props**: (Australia) Laiema Bosenavulagi; (Samoa) Ana Mamea; (Australia) Hayley Glass; (Fiji) **Jiowana Sauto**; (Australia) Paula Ioane; **Hookers**: (New Zealand) Jayme Nuku; (Australia) **Ashley Marsters** (c); (Australia) Mary Tua'ana; **Locks**: (Samoa) Easter Savelio; (Australia) Tiarah Minns; (Australia) Fapiola Uoifaleahi	**Loose Forwards**: (Papua New Guinea) **Laetitia Bobo**; (Papua New Guinea) Mel Kawa (vc); (Australia) Sui Pauaraisa; (Australia) Hollie Twidale; (Australia) Sydney Niupulusu; (Australia) **Grace Hamilton**; **Scrum-halves**: (Australia) Lucy Brown; **Fly-halves**: (Samoa) **Cassie Siataga**; (Australia) Sarah Hogan	**Centres**: (Australia) Crystal Mayes; (Australia) Harmony Vatau; (New Zealand) Grace Freeman; (Australia) Georgia Fowler; **Wingers**: (Australia) Tasmin Barber; (Australia) Halley Derera; (Australia) Tyra Boysen-Auimatagi; (Australia) Mia-Rae Clifford; **Fullbacks**: (Australia) Chanelle Kohika-Skipper; (Australia) Teuila Pritchard; (Australia) Millicent Scutt
(cc) Denotes team co-captains, **Bold** denotes internationally capped, ^{SP} denotes a shadow player and ^{ST} indicated short-term cover.

== Season standings ==
Super W

Year	Pos	Pld	W	D	L	F	A	+/-	BP	Pts	Play-offs
2024	5th	5	1	0	4	85	136	−51	0	4	Did not compete
2023	6th	5	0	0	5	40	154	–114	0	1	Did not compete
2022	5th	4	0	1	3	37	205	–168	0	2	Lost 5th place match to Brumbies
2021	3rd, Pool B	3	0	0	3	25	57	−32	1	1	Lost 5th place match to Brumbies
2020	4th	4	1	0	3	59	188	−129	2	6	Did not compete
2019	5th	4	0	0	4	22	285	−263	0	0	Did not compete
2018	5th	4	0	0	4	21	239	−218	0	0	Did not compete

== Coaches ==
Melbourne Rebels Women coaches by date, matches and win percentage*
Coach	Term	P	W	D	L	Win %
Alana Thomas	2018–2022	19	1	1	17	5.26%
Jason Rogers	2023–2024	5	0	1	5	0.00%
Totals (2018–2024)^{*}		24	1	1	22	4.16%
Updated to: **6 March 2024**

Notes:

^* Official Super Rugby Women's competition matches only, including finals.
