= 2023 WXV squads =

Rugby union tournament squads

The 2023 WXV was held in New Zealand, South Africa, and the United Arab Emirates from 13 October to 4 November 2023. Eighteen teams have qualified across three divisions.

Note: The age and number of caps listed for each player is as of 13 October 2023, the first day of the tournament.

== Overview ==
Below is a table that lists all the head coaches and captains of each nation.

Team	Coach(es)	Captain
Australia	(Australia) Jay Tregonning	Michaela Leonard
Canada	(France) Kévin Rouet	Sophie de Goede
Colombia	(Colombia) Lissette Martínez	Camila Lopera
England	(England) Louis Deacon	Marlie Packer
Fiji	(Fiji) Inoke Male	Sereima Leweniqila
France	(France) Gaëlle Mignot (France) David Ortiz	Manae Feleu
Ireland	(England) Scott Bemand	Edel McMahon; Sam Monaghan
Italy	(Italy) Giovanni Raineri	Sofia Stefan
Japan	(Canada) Lesley McKenzie	Iroha Nagata
Kazakhstan	(Kazakhstan) Makhabbat Tugambekova	Karina Sazontova
Kenya	(Kenya) Dennis Mwanja	Enid Ouma
New Zealand	(New Zealand) Allan Bunting	Kennedy Simon; Ruahei Demant
Samoa	(Samoa) Ramsey Tomokino	
Scotland	(Scotland) Bryan Easson	Rachel Malcolm
South Africa	(South Africa) Louis Koen	Babalwa Latsha
Spain	(Spain) Juan González Marruecos	Cristina Blanco
United States	(New Zealand) Milton Haig	Kate Zackary
Wales	(Wales) Ioan Cunningham	Hannah Jones

== WXV 1 ==
=== Australia ===
Australia announced their final squad on 19 September 2023.

Head coach: (Australia) Jay Tregonning

Player	Position	Date of birth (age)	Caps	Club/province
Ashley Marsters	Hooker	2 November 1993 (aged 29)	23	(Australia) Melbourne Rebels
Tania Naden	Hooker	20 February 1992 (aged 31)	6	(Australia) ACT Brumbies
Adiana Talakai	Hooker	24 February 1999 (aged 24)	12	(Australia) NSW Waratahs
Bree-Anna Cheatham	Prop	29 March 1997 (aged 26)	5	(Australia) Queensland Reds
Brianna Hoy	Prop	7 July 2000 (aged 23)	0	(Australia) NSW Waratahs
Eva Karpani	Prop	18 June 1996 (aged 27)	17	(Australia) NSW Waratahs
Bridie O'Gorman	Prop	8 December 1998 (aged 24)	15	(Australia) NSW Waratahs
Emily Robinson	Prop	6 February 1993 (aged 30)	20	(Australia) NSW Waratahs
Annabelle Codey	Lock	3 February 1997 (aged 26)	4	(Australia) Queensland Reds
Atasi Lafai	Lock	24 July 1994 (aged 29)	6	(Australia) NSW Waratahs
Kaitlan Leaney	Lock	10 October 2000 (aged 23)	11	(England) Harlequins
Michaela Leonard (c)	Lock	6 March 1995 (aged 28)	18	(Australia) Western Force
Sera Naiqama	Lock	26 July 1995 (aged 28)	10	(Australia) NSW Waratahs
Emily Chancellor	Flanker	20 August 1991 (aged 32)	19	(England) Harlequins
Leilani Nathan	Back row	20 July 2000 (aged 23)	0	(Australia) NSW Waratahs
Tabua Tuinakauvadra	Back row	27 December 2002 (aged 20)	1	(Australia) ACT Brumbies
Jasmin Huriwai	Scrum-half	27 September 1993 (aged 30)	4	(Australia) ACT Brumbies
Layne Morgan	Scrum-half	20 April 1999 (aged 24)	15	(Australia) NSW Waratahs
Carys Dallinger	Fly-half	30 April 2000 (aged 23)	2	(Australia) Queensland Reds
Arabella McKenzie	Fly-half	1 March 1999 (aged 24)	18	(England) Harlequins
Faitala Moleka	Fly-half	29 January 2005 (aged 18)	2	(Australia) ACT Brumbies
Trilleen Pomare	Fly-half	5 April 1993 (aged 30)	21	(Australia) Western Force
Georgina Friedrichs	Centre	14 April 1995 (aged 28)	15	(Australia) NSW Waratahs
Cecilia Smith	Centre	13 March 1994 (aged 29)	8	(Australia) Queensland Reds
Melanie Wilks	Centre	13 January 2000 (aged 23)	0	(Australia) Queensland Reds
Desirée Miller	Wing	13 January 2002 (aged 21)	0	(Australia) NSW Waratahs
Maya Stewart	Wing	14 March 2000 (aged 23)	5	(Australia) NSW Waratahs
Ivania Wong	Wing	23 September 1997 (aged 26)	11	(Australia) Queensland Reds
Lori Cramer	Fullback	8 March 1993 (aged 30)	17	(England) Exeter Chiefs
Siokapesi Palu	Utility back	15 October 1996 (aged 26)	3	(Australia) ACT Brumbies

=== Canada ===
Canada announced their final squad on 1 October 2023.

Head coach: (France) Kévin Rouet

Player	Position	Date of birth (age)	Caps	Club/province
Emily Tuttosi	Hooker	21 September 1995 (aged 28)	19	(England) Exeter Chiefs
Gillian Boag	Hooker	19 February 1995 (aged 28)	23	(Canada) Capilano RFC
Sara Cline	Hooker	{{{age}}}		(Canada) Leprechaun Tigers
Alexandria Ellis	Prop	1 August 1995 (aged 28)	16	(England) Saracens
Brittany Kassil	Prop	14 March 1991 (aged 32)	36	(Canada) Guelph Redcoats
DaLeaka Menin	Prop	16 June 1995 (aged 28)	45	(England) Exeter Chiefs
Mikiela Nelson	Prop	27 November 1997 (aged 25)	7	(Canada) Capilano RFC
Ashlynn Smith	Lock	{{{age}}}		(Canada) Calgary Dinos
McKinley Hunt	Lock	5 January 1997 (aged 26)	14	(England) Saracens
Tyson Beukeboom	Lock	10 March 1991 (aged 32)	60	(England) Ealing Trailfinders
Courtney Holtkamp	Back row	25 April 1999 (aged 24)	28	(Canada) Red Deer Titans Rugby
Fabiola Forteza	Back row	4 August 1995 (aged 28)	20	(France) Stade Bordelais
Gabrielle Senft	Back row	13 June 1997 (aged 26)	18	(France) Stade Bordelais
Julia Omokhuale	Back row	{{{age}}}		(Canada) Calgary Dinos
Laetitia Royer	Back row	{{{age}}}		(France) ASM Romagnat
Sara Svoboda	Back row	3 February 1995 (aged 28)	21	(England) Loughborough Lightning
Sophie de Goede	Back row	30 June 1999 (aged 24)	24	(England) Saracens
Justine Pelletier	Scrum-half	27 February 2001 (aged 22)	18	(France) Stade Bordelais
Olivia Apps	Scrum-half	1 December 1998 (aged 24)	1	(Canada) Lindsay RFC
Alexandra Tessier	Fly-half	3 September 1993 (aged 30)	42	(England) Exeter Chiefs
Claire Gallagher	Fly-half	{{{age}}}		(Canada) Ottawa Gee-Gees
Julia Schell	Fly-half	13 July 1996 (aged 27)	9	(Canada) Guelph Redcoats / Castaway Wanderers
Sarah-Maude Lachance	Fly-half	7 December 1998 (aged 24)	5	(France) Lons Section Paloise
Fancy Bermudez	Centre	27 May 2002 (aged 21)	4	(Canada) Westshore RFC
Shoshanah Seumanutafa	Centre	17 September 1999 (aged 24)		(Canada) UBC Thunderbirds
Florence Symonds	Wing	20 May 2002 (aged 21)	1	(Canada) UBC Thunderbirds
Paige Farries	Wing	12 August 1994 (aged 29)	27	(England) Worcester Warriors
Sabrina Poulin	Wing	3 October 1992 (aged 31)	12	(Canada) Eibar Rugby Taldea
Krissy Scurfield	Utility back	15 June 2003 (aged 20)		(Canada) Victoria Vikes
Madison Grant	Utility back	12 March 2001 (aged 22)	14	(Canada) Cornwall Claymores

=== England ===
England announced their final squad on 1 October 2023.

^{1} On 8 October 2023, Sadia Kabeya was replaced by Daisy Hibbert-Jones, after sustaining an injury.

^{2} On 8 October 2023, Lucy Packer was replaced by Emma Sing, after sustaining an injury.

Head coach: (England) Louis Deacon

Player	Position	Date of birth (age)	Caps	Club/province
Lark Atkin-Davies	Hooker	3 March 1995 (aged 28)	51	(England) Bristol Bears
Amy Cokayne	Hooker	11 July 1996 (aged 27)	72	(England) Leicester Tigers
Connie Powell	Hooker	13 July 2000 (aged 23)	11	(England) Harlequins
Sarah Bern	Prop	10 July 1997 (aged 26)	57	(England) Bristol Bears
Hannah Botterman	Prop	8 June 1999 (aged 24)	39	(England) Bristol Bears
Mackenzie Carson	Prop	28 November 1998 (aged 24)	7	(England) Gloucester-Hartpury
Kelsey Clifford	Prop	11 December 2001 (aged 21)	2	(England) Saracens
Maud Muir	Prop	12 July 2001 (aged 22)	22	(England) Gloucester-Hartpury
Zoe Aldcroft	Lock	19 November 1996 (aged 26)	45	(England) Gloucester-Hartpury
Rosie Galligan	Lock	30 April 1998 (aged 25)	11	(England) Saracens
Catherine O'Donnell	Lock	13 June 1996 (aged 27)	29	(England) Loughborough Lightning
Morwenna Talling	Lock	29 September 2002 (aged 21)	9	(England) Sale Sharks
Maisy Allen	Back row	21 September 2001 (aged 22)	2	(England) Exeter Chiefs
Sarah Beckett	Back row	14 February 1999 (aged 24)	31	(England) Gloucester-Hartpury
Daisy Hibbert-Jones^{1}	Back row	21 August 2002 (aged 21)		(England) Loughborough Lightning
Sadia Kabeya^{1}	Back row	22 February 2002 (aged 21)	12	(England) Loughborough Lightning
Alex Matthews	Back row	3 August 1993 (aged 30)	59	(England) Gloucester-Hartpury
Marlie Packer (c)	Back row	2 October 1989 (aged 34)	96	(England) Saracens
Natasha Hunt	Scrum-half	21 March 1989 (aged 34)	64	(England) Gloucester-Hartpury
Lucy Packer^{2}	Scrum-half	2 February 2000 (aged 23)	16	(England) Harlequins
Ella Wyrwas	Scrum-half	7 March 1999 (aged 24)	3	(England) Saracens
Holly Aitchison	Fly-half	13 September 1997 (aged 26)	22	(England) Bristol Bears
Helena Rowland	Fly-half	19 September 1999 (aged 24)	25	(England) Loughborough Lightning
Sophie Bridger	Centre	26 June 2000 (aged 23)	1	(England) Saracens
Tatyana Heard	Centre	14 January 1995 (aged 28)	15	(England) Gloucester-Hartpury
Megan Jones	Centre	28 October 1996 (aged 26)	41	(England) Leicester Tigers
Amber Reed	Centre	3 April 1991 (aged 32)	66	(England) Bristol Bears
Jess Breach	Wing	4 November 1997 (aged 25)	30	(England) Saracens
Abigail Dow	Wing	29 September 1997 (aged 26)	37	(England) Ealing Trailfinders
Claudia MacDonald	Wing	4 January 1996 (aged 27)	30	(England) Exeter Chiefs
Ellie Kildunne	Fullback	8 September 1999 (aged 24)	36	(England) Harlequins
Emma Sing^{2}	Fullback	11 March 2001 (aged 22)	5	(England) Gloucester-Hartpury

=== France ===
France announced their final squad on 2 October 2023.

Head coach: (France) Gaëlle Mignot (France) David Ortiz

Player	Position	Date of birth (age)	Caps	Club/province
Agathe Sochat	Hooker	21 May 1995 (aged 28)	32	(France) Stade Bordelais
Laure Touyé	Hooker	12 May 1996 (aged 27)		(France) Montpellier HR
Yllana Brosseau	Prop	5 September 2000 (aged 23)		(France) AC Bobigny 93 Rugby
Clara Joyeux	Prop	10 January 1998 (aged 25)	30	(France) Blagnac Rugby Féminin
Assia Khalfaoui	Prop	24 March 2001 (aged 22)	14	(France) Stade Bordelais
Coco Lindelauf	Prop	17 January 2001 (aged 22)		(France) Blagnac Rugby Féminin
Ambre Mwayembe	Lock	6 April 2004 (aged 19)	2	(France) FC Grenoble Amazones
Élisa Riffonneau	Lock	3 September 2003 (aged 20)	3	(England) Ealing Trailfinders
Madoussou Fall	Lock	17 March 1998 (aged 25)		(France) Stade Bordelais
Manaé Feleu	Lock	3 February 2000 (aged 23)	3	(France) FC Grenoble Amazones
Audrey Forlani	Lock	19 November 1991 (aged 31)	47	(France) Blagnac Rugby Féminin
Kiara Zago	Lock	11 October 2005 (aged 18)		(France) Stade Toulousain
Axelle Berthoumieu	Flanker	9 July 2000 (aged 23)	9	(France) Blagnac Rugby Féminin
Léa Champon	Flanker	28 November 2003 (aged 19)		(France) FC Grenoble Amazones
Charlotte Escudero	Flanker	26 December 2000 (aged 22)	11	(France) Blagnac Rugby Féminin
Gaëlle Hermet	Flanker	12 June 1996 (aged 27)	38	(France) Stade Toulousain
Émeline Gros	Number 8	19 August 1995 (aged 28)	20	(France) FC Grenoble Amazones
Océane Bordes	Scrum-half	16 May 2002 (aged 21)		(France) Stade Toulousain
Pauline Bourdon	Scrum-half	4 November 1995 (aged 27)	38	(France) Stade Toulousain
Alexandra Chambon	Scrum-half	2 August 2000 (aged 23)	14	(France) FC Grenoble Amazones
Carla Arbez	Fly-half	24 May 1999 (age 27)	4	(France) Stade Bordelais
Morgane Bourgeois	Fly-half	6 February 2003 (aged 20)	1	(France) Stade Bordelais
Lina Queyroi	Centre	18 May 2001 (aged 22)		(France) Blagnac Rugby Féminin
Nassira Konde	Centre	30 July 1999 (aged 24)		(France) Stade Bordelais
Gabrielle Vernier	Centre	12 June 1997 (aged 26)	30	(France) Blagnac Rugby Féminin
Cyrielle Banet	Wing	29 August 1994 (age 32)	18	(France) Montpellier HR
Marine Ménager	Wing	26 July 1996 (aged 27)		(France) Montpellier HR
Caroline Boujard	Wing	6 January 1994 (aged 29)	26	(France) Montpellier HR
Émilie Boulard	Fullback	23 August 1999 (aged 24)	23	(France) Blagnac Rugby Féminin
Suliana Sivi	Fullback	{{{age}}}		(France) Stade Rennais Rugby

=== New Zealand ===
New Zealand announced their final squad on 11 September 2023.

Head coach: (New Zealand) Allan Bunting

Player	Position	Date of birth (age)	Caps	Club/province
Georgia Ponsonby	Hooker	14 December 1999 (aged 23)	17	(New Zealand) Matatū / Canterbury
Luka Connor	Hooker	24 September 1996 (aged 27)	17	(New Zealand) Chiefs Manawa / Bay of Plenty
Natalie Delamere	Hooker	9 November 1996 (aged 26)	3	(New Zealand) Matatū / Bay of Plenty
Kate Henwood	Prop	28 January 1989 (aged 34)	2	(New Zealand) Chiefs Manawa / Bay of Plenty
Krystal Murray	Prop	16 June 1993 (aged 30)	11	(New Zealand) Hurricanes Poua / Northland
Chryss Viliko	Prop	25 December 2000 (aged 22)	1	(New Zealand) Blues / Auckland
Amy Rule	Prop	15 July 2000 (aged 23)	17	(New Zealand) Matatū / Canterbury
Sophie Fisher	Prop	25 November 1998 (aged 24)	0	(New Zealand) Blues / Auckland
Tanya Kalounivale	Prop	20 November 1999 (aged 23)	8	(New Zealand) Chiefs Manawa / Waikato
Charmaine Smith	Lock	15 November 1990 (aged 32)	28	(New Zealand) Chiefs Manawa / Northland
Chelsea Bremner	Lock	11 April 1995 (aged 28)	15	(New Zealand) Chiefs Manawa / Canterbury
Maia Roos	Lock	17 July 2001 (aged 22)	18	(New Zealand) Blues / Auckland
Alana Bremner	Loose forward	10 February 1997 (aged 26)	16	(New Zealand) Matatū / Canterbury
Kennedy Simon (cc)	Loose forward	1 October 1996 (aged 27)	17	(New Zealand) Chiefs Manawa / Waikato
Layla Sae	Loose forward	22 October 2000 (aged 22)	1	(New Zealand) Hurricanes Poua / Manawatū
Liana Mikaele-Tu'u	Loose forward	2 March 2002 (aged 21)	15	(New Zealand) Blues / Auckland
Lucy Jenkins	Loose forward	30 November 2000 (aged 22)	3	(New Zealand) Matatū / Canterbury
Ariana Bayler	Scrum-half	14 December 1996 (aged 26)	7	(New Zealand) Blues / Waikato
Arihiana Marino-Tauhinu	Scrum-half	29 March 1992 (aged 31)	16	(New Zealand) Chiefs Manawa / Counties Manukau
Iritana Hohaia	Scrum-half	1 March 2000 (aged 23)	4	(New Zealand) Hurricanes Poua / Taranaki
Rosie Kelly	Fly-half	16 January 2000 (aged 23)	3	(New Zealand) Matatū / Canterbury
Ruahei Demant (cc)	Fly-half	21 April 1995 (aged 28)	30	(New Zealand) Blues / Auckland
Amy du Plessis	Centre	7 July 1999 (aged 24)	11	(New Zealand) Matatū / Canterbury
Sylvia Brunt	Centre	1 January 2004 (aged 19)	10	(New Zealand) Blues / Auckland
Patricia Maliepo	Centre	13 March 2003 (aged 20)	4	(New Zealand) Blues / Auckland
Katelyn Vaha'akolo	Wing	18 April 2000 (aged 23)	3	(New Zealand) Blues / Auckland
Martha Mataele	Wing	9 July 1999 (aged 24)	1	(New Zealand) Matatū / Canterbury
Mererangi Paul	Wing	29 October 1998 (aged 24)	3	(New Zealand) Chiefs Manawa / Counties Manukau
Renee Holmes	Fullback	21 December 1999 (aged 23)	13	(New Zealand) Matatū / Waikato
Ruby Tui	Fullback	13 December 1991 (aged 31)	10	(New Zealand) Counties Manukau

=== Wales ===
Wales announced their final squad on 1 October 2023.

Head coach: (Wales) Ioan Cunningham

Player	Position	Date of birth (age)	Caps	Club/province
Kat Evans	Hooker	9 January 1986 (aged 37)		(England) Saracens
Kelsey Jones	Hooker	4 September 1997 (aged 26)		(England) Gloucester-Hartpury
Carys Phillips	Hooker	12 November 1992 (aged 30)		(England) Worcester Warriors
Abbey Constable	Prop	18 June 1991 (aged 32)		(England) Gloucester-Hartpury
Cerys Hale	Prop	4 April 1993 (aged 30)		(England) Gloucester-Hartpury
Gwenllian Pyrs	Prop	28 November 1997 (aged 25)		(England) Bristol Bears
Donna Rose	Prop	5 June 1991 (aged 32)		(England) Saracens
Sisilia Tuipulotu	Prop	14 August 2003 (aged 20)		(England) Gloucester-Hartpury
Georgia Evans	Lock	29 January 1997 (aged 26)		(England) Saracens
Abbie Fleming	Lock	31 March 1996 (aged 27)		(England) Harlequins
Alisha Butchers	Back row	14 June 1997 (aged 26)		(England) Bristol Bears
Alex Callender	Back row	29 July 2000 (aged 23)		(England) Worcester Warriors
Sioned Harries	Back row	22 November 1989 (aged 33)		(England) Worcester Warriors
Bryonie King	Back row	14 August 2003 (aged 20)		(England) Bristol Bears
Bethan Lewis	Back row	19 February 1999 (aged 24)		(England) Gloucester-Hartpury
Kate Williams	Back row	5 April 2000 (aged 23)		(England) Gloucester-Hartpury
Keira Bevan	Scrum-half	28 April 1997 (aged 26)		(England) Bristol Bears
Megan Davies	Scrum-half	19 January 2002 (aged 21)		(England) Bristol Bears
Lleucu George	Fly-half	12 January 2000 (aged 23)		(England) Gloucester-Hartpury
Niamh Terry	Fly-half	30 April 2000 (aged 23)		(England) Worcester Warriors
Robyn Wilkins	Fly-half	1 April 1995 (aged 28)		(England) Exeter Chiefs
Hannah Jones (c)	Centre	14 November 1996 (aged 26)		(England) Gloucester-Hartpury
Kerin Lake	Centre	24 May 1990 (aged 33)		(England) Gloucester-Hartpury
Carys Williams-Morris	Centre	28 September 1993 (aged 30)		(England) Loughborough Lightning
Megan Webb	Centre	9 January 2001 (aged 22)		(England) Bristol Bears
Hannah Bluck	Wing	1 April 1997 (aged 26)		(England) Worcester Warriors
Carys Cox	Wing	5 November 1998 (aged 24)		(England) Worcester Warriors
Jasmine Joyce	Wing	9 October 1995 (aged 28)		(England) Bristol Bears
Nel Metcalfe	Wing	17 December 2004 (aged 18)		(England) Gloucester-Hartpury
Lisa Neumann	Fullback	23 December 1993 (aged 29)		(England) Gloucester-Hartpury

== WXV 2 ==
=== Italy ===
Italy announced their final squad on 1 October 2023.

Head coach: (Italy) Giovanni Raineri

Player	Position	Date of birth (age)	Caps	Club/province
Laura Gurioli	Hooker	{{{age}}}	4	(Italy) ASD Villorba Rugby
Vittoria Vecchini	Hooker	13 January 2002 (aged 21)	20	(Italy) Valsugana Rugby Padova
Lucia Gai	Prop	3 May 1991 (aged 32)	92	(Italy) Valsugana Rugby Padova
Gaia Maris	Prop	27 July 2001 (aged 22)	22	(France) ASM Romagnat Rugby
Sara Seye	Prop	{{{age}}}	17	(England) Ealing Trailfinders
Emanuela Stecca	Prop	{{{age}}}	7	(Italy) ASD Villorba Rugby
Silvia Turani	Prop	6 July 1995 (aged 28)	27	(England) Harlequins
Giordana Duca	Lock	18 September 1992 (aged 31)	41	(Italy) Valsugana Rugby Padova
Valeria Fedrighi	Lock	{{{age}}}	47	(France) Stade Toulousain
Isabella Locatelli	Lock	{{{age}}}	44	(Italy) Rugby Colorno
Sara Tounesi	Lock	{{{age}}}	32	(England) Sale Sharks
Giulia Cavina	Flanker	{{{age}}}	1	(Italy) CUS Milano
Alessandra Frangipani	Flanker	{{{age}}}	3	(Italy) ASD Villorba Rugby
Elisa Giordano	Flanker	1 November 1990 (aged 32)	64	(Italy) Valsugana Rugby Padova
Alissa Ranuccini	Flanker	{{{age}}}	5	(Italy) Rugby Colorno
Francesca Granzotto	Scrum-half	{{{age}}}	5	(Italy) Unione Rugby Capitolina
Sofia Stefan	Scrum-half	12 May 1992 (aged 31)	80	(Italy) Valsugana Rugby Padova
Veronica Madia	Fly-half	16 January 1995 (aged 28)	43	(France) Grenoble Amazones
Emma Stevanin	Fly-half	{{{age}}}	8	(Italy) Valsugana Rugby Padova
Gaia Buso	Centre	{{{age}}}	1	(Italy) Rugby Colorno
Beatrice Capomaggi	Centre	{{{age}}}	9	(Italy) ASD Villorba Rugby
Alyssa D'Incà	Centre	23 March 2002 (aged 21)	18	(Italy) ASD Villorba Rugby
Beatrice Rigoni	Centre	1 August 1995 (aged 28)	67	(England) Sale Sharks
Michela Sillari	Centre	23 February 1993 (aged 30)	80	(Italy) Valsugana Rugby Padova
Aura Muzzo	Wing	{{{age}}}	38	(Italy) ASD Villorba Rugby
Vittoria Ostuni Minuzzi	Wing	6 December 2001 (aged 21)	26	(Italy) Valsugana Rugby Padova
Sofia Catellani	??	{{{age}}}	0	(Italy) Rugby Colorno
Elena Errichiello	??	{{{age}}}	0	(Italy) Unione Rugby Capitolina
Nicole Mastrangelo	??	{{{age}}}	0	(Italy) Unione Rugby Capitolina
Alessia Pilani	??	{{{age}}}	2	(Italy) Rugby Colorno

=== Japan ===
Japan announced their final squad on 1 October 2023.

Head coach: (Canada) Lesley McKenzie

Player	Position	Date of birth (age)	Caps	Club/province
Hinata Komaki	Hooker	9 May 2001 (aged 22)	11	(Japan) Nippon Sport Science University
Nijiho Nagata	Hooker	6 December 2000 (aged 22)	13	
Kotomi Taniguchi	Hooker	10 April 1995 (aged 28)	10	(Japan) Yokogawa Musashino Artemi-Stars
Natsuki Kashigawa	Prop	22 September 1998 (aged 25)	0	(Japan) Tokyo Sankyu Phoenix
Sachiko Kato	Prop	19 February 2000 (aged 23)	19	(Japan) Yokogawa Musashino Artemi-Stars
Asuka Kuge	Prop	22 September 1994 (aged 29)	5	(Japan) Arukas Queen Kumagaya
Yuka Sadaka	Prop	2 November 1994 (aged 28)	17	(Japan) Hirosaki Sakura Ovals
Masami Kawamura	Lock	13 July 1999 (aged 24)	8	(Japan) RKU Rugby Ryugasaki Grace
Jennifer Nduka	Lock	18 October 2000 (aged 22)	2	(Japan) Hokkaido Barbarians Diana
Mio Nishimura	Lock	29 November 2002 (aged 20)	3	(Japan) Nippon Sport Science University
Otoka Yoshimura	Lock	15 May 2001 (aged 22)	12	(Japan) Arukas Queen Kumagaya
Sakurako Korai	Back row	9 April 2003 (aged 20)	6	(Japan) Nippon Sport Science University
Ayano Nagai	Back row	14 October 1997 (aged 25)	18	(Japan) Yokohama TKM
Iroha Nagata (c)	Back row	21 December 1998 (aged 24)	24	(Japan) Arukas Queen Kumagaya
Seina Saito	Back row	30 May 1992 (aged 31)	37	(Japan) MIE Pearls
Sakurako Hatada	Forward	8 May 2003 (aged 20)	1	(Japan) Nippon Sport Science University
Manami Mine	Forward	11 September 2003 (aged 20)	1	(Japan) Nippon Sport Science University
Mei Yoshimoto	Forward	21 March 2002 (aged 21)	1	(Japan) Otemon Gakuin University
Megumi Abe	Scrum-half	28 April 1994 (aged 29)	17	(Japan) Arukas Queen Kumagaya
Moe Tsukui	Scrum-half	28 March 2000 (aged 23)	27	(Japan) Yokogawa Musashino Artemi-Stars
Ayasa Otsuka	Fly-half	5 May 1999 (aged 24)	18	(Japan) RKU Rugby Ryugasaki Grace
Minori Yamamoto	Fly-half	9 December 1996 (aged 26)	25	(England) Worcester Warriors
Mana Furuta	Centre	16 November 1997 (aged 25)	22	(Japan) Tokyo Sankyu Phoenix
Kanako Kobayashi	Centre	13 November 1998 (aged 24)	9	(Japan) Yokogawa Musashino Artemi-Stars
Komachi Imakugi	Wing	6 January 2002 (aged 21)	17	(Japan) Arukas Queen Kumagaya
Nao Ando	Back	17 July 2001 (aged 22)	3	(Japan) Brave Louve
Sora Nishimura	Back	29 September 2000 (aged 23)	5	(Japan) MIE Pearls
Haruka Hirotsu	Back	29 October 2000 (aged 22)	3	(Japan) Nanairo Prism Fukuoka
Misaki Matsumura	Back	6 March 2005 (aged 18)	2	(Japan) Tokyo Sankyu Phoenix
Kotono Yasuo	Fullback	2 October 2001 (aged 22)	6	(Japan) Brave Louve

=== Samoa ===
Samoa announced their final squad on 2 October 2023.

Head coach: (Samoa) Ramsey Tomokino

Player	Position	Date of birth (age)	Caps	Club/province
Lulu Leuta	Hooker	{{{age}}}		
Sosoli Talawadua	Hooker	30 January 1989 (aged 34)	0	(New Zealand) Hurricanes Poua
Rereglory Aiono	Prop	{{{age}}}		
Maletina Brown	Prop	{{{age}}}	0	
Avau Filimaua	Prop	{{{age}}}		
Ana Mamea	Prop	{{{age}}}		
Easter Savelio	Lock	{{{age}}}		
Olalini Tafoulua	Lock	{{{age}}}		
Fa'alua Tugaga	Lock	{{{age}}}		
Nina Foaese	Loose forward	{{{age}}}		
Sui Pauaraisa (c)	Loose forward	30 October 1987 (aged 35)		
Sinead Ryder	Loose forward	{{{age}}}	0	
Tia Tauasosi	Loose forward	{{{age}}}		
Tiara-Lee Fanuatunu	Forward	{{{age}}}	0	
Angelica Uila	Forward	{{{age}}}		
Mary Lumsden	Forward	{{{age}}}		
Bella Milo	Scrum-half	29 May 1986 (aged 37)		
Fogamanono Tusiga	Scrum-half	{{{age}}}		
Hasting Leiataua	Fly-half	{{{age}}}		
Cassie Siataga	Fly-half	{{{age}}}		
Utumalama Atonio	Centre	{{{age}}}		
Hope Schuster	Centre	{{{age}}}		
Linda Fiafia	Wing	{{{age}}}		
Allison Futialo	Wing	{{{age}}}		
Karla Wright-Akeli	Fullback	{{{age}}}	0	
Saelua Leaula	Back	{{{age}}}		
Rebeka Cordero-Tufuga	Back	2 May 1996 (aged 27)	0	(New Zealand) Manawatū Cyclones
Ta'alili Iosefo	Back	{{{age}}}		
Lutia Col Aumua	Back	{{{age}}}	0	
Michelle Curry	Back	{{{age}}}		

=== Scotland ===
Scotland announced their final squad on 18 September 2023.

^{1} On 3 October 2023, Holly McIntyre was replaced by Sarah Law, after sustaining an injury in training.

Head coach: (Scotland) Bryan Easson

Player	Position	Date of birth (age)	Caps	Club/province
Elis Martin	Hooker	23 May 1999 (aged 24)		(England) Leicester Tigers
Lana Skeldon	Hooker	18 October 1993 (aged 29)		(England) Worcester Warriors
Leah Bartlett	Prop	28 August 1998 (aged 25)		(England) Leicester Tigers
Christine Belisle	Prop	4 November 1993 (aged 29)		(England) Loughborough Lightning
Elliann Clarke	Prop	16 February 2001 (aged 22)		(England) Bristol Bears
Lisa Cockburn	Prop	6 December 1992 (aged 30)		(England) Worcester Warriors
Demi Swann	Prop	??		(England) Worcester Warriors
Anne Young	Prop	17 March 2000 (aged 23)		(England) Sale Sharks
Sarah Bonar	Lock	9 February 1994 (aged 29)		(England) Harlequins
Eva Donaldson	Lock	25 February 2002 (aged 21)		(England) Leicester Tigers
Fiona McIntosh	Lock	??		(England) Saracens
Louise McMillan	Lock	27 July 1997 (aged 26)		(England) Saracens
Emma Wassell	Lock	28 December 1994 (aged 28)		(England) Loughborough Lightning
Evie Gallagher	Back row	22 August 2000 (aged 23)		(England) Worcester Warriors
Jade Konkel	Back row	9 December 1993 (aged 29)		(England) Harlequins
Rachel Malcolm (c)	Back row	23 May 1991 (aged 32)		(England) Loughborough Lightning
Rachel McLachlan	Back row	26 February 1999 (aged 24)		(England) Sale Sharks
Caity Mattinson	Scrum-half	17 May 1996 (aged 27)		(England) Worcester Warriors
Mairi McDonald	Scrum-half	25 November 1997 (aged 25)		(England) Exeter Chiefs
Helen Nelson	Fly-half	24 May 1994 (aged 29)		(England) Loughborough Lightning
Sarah Law^{1}	Fly-half	19 December 1994 (aged 28)		(England) Sale Sharks
Beth Blacklock	Centre	13 November 1997 (aged 25)		(England) Saracens
Coreen Grant	Centre	30 January 1998 (aged 25)		(England) Saracens
Holly McIntyre^{1}	Centre	??		(Scotland) University of Edinburgh
Emma Orr	Centre	6 April 2004 (aged 19)		(Scotland) Heriot's
Lisa Thomson	Centre	7 September 1997 (aged 26)		(United Kingdom) GB 7s
Meryl Smith	Centre	11 June 2001 (aged 22)		(England) Bristol Bears
Francesca McGhie	Wing	7 May 2003 (aged 20)		(England) Leicester Tigers
Rhona Lloyd	Wing	17 October 1996 (aged 26)		(United Kingdom) GB 7s
Liz Musgrove	Wing	25 December 1996 (aged 26)		(England) Ealing Trailfinders
Chloe Rollie	Fullback	26 June 1995 (aged 28)		(England) Loughborough Lightning

=== South Africa ===
South Africa announced their final squad on 29 September 2023.

Head coach: (South Africa) Louis Koen

Player	Position	Date of birth (age)	Caps	Club/province
Lindelwa Gwala	Hooker	{{{age}}}	25	(England) Ealing Trailfinders Women
Catha Jacobs	Second row	{{{age}}}	11	(England) Leicester Tigers Women
Aseza Hele	Forward	{{{age}}}	18	(England) Harlequins Women
Lusanda Dumke	Forward	{{{age}}}	24	(South Africa) Bulls Daisies
Nompumelelo Mathe	Forward	{{{age}}}	15	(South Africa) Sharks Women
Danelle Lochner	Forward	{{{age}}}	6	(South Africa) DHL Western Province
Vainah Ubisi	Forward	{{{age}}}	5	(South Africa) Bulls Daisies
Sinazo Mcatshulwa	Forward	{{{age}}}	23	(South Africa) DHL Western Province
Nolusindiso Booi (vc)	Forward	{{{age}}}	36	(South Africa) DHL Western Province
Babalwa Latsha (c)	Forward	{{{age}}}	23	(England) Harlequins Women
Amber Schonert	Forward	{{{age}}}	3	(England) Sale Sharks Women
Yonela Ngxingolo	Forward	{{{age}}}	24	(South Africa) Bulls Daisies
Asithandile Ntoyanto	Forward	{{{age}}}	18	(South Africa) Bulls Daisies
Sanelisiwe Charlie	Forward	{{{age}}}	10	(South Africa) EP Queens
Roseline Botes	Forward	{{{age}}}	12	(South Africa) DHL Western Province
Micke Gunter	Forward	{{{age}}}	5	(South Africa) Bulls Daisies
Lucell Hanekom	Forward	{{{age}}}	1	(South Africa) DHL Western Province
Byrhandrè Dolf	Back	{{{age}}}	6	(South Africa) Bulls Daisies
Mary Zulu	Back	{{{age}}}	4	(South Africa) Sharks Women
Chuma Qawe	Back	{{{age}}}	4	(South Africa) DHL Western Province
Veroeshka Grain	Back	{{{age}}}	13	(South Africa) DHL Western Province
Unathi Mali	Back	3 December 1989 (aged 33)	1	(South Africa) Bulls Daisies
Maceala Samboya	Back	{{{age}}}	0	(South Africa) Boland Dames
Jakkie Cilliers	Back	{{{age}}}	9	(South Africa) Bulls Daisies
Piwokuhle Nyanda	Back	{{{age}}}	4	(South Africa) Mastercard Golden Lions Women
Shaunique Hess	Back	{{{age}}}	2	(South Africa) DHL Western Province
Libbie Janse van Rensburg (vc)	Back	{{{age}}}	16	(South Africa) Bulls Daisies
Rumandi Potgieter	Back	{{{age}}}	8	(South Africa) Bulls Daisies
Unam Tose	Back	{{{age}}}	17	(South Africa) Bulls Daisies
Tayla Kinsey	Back	{{{age}}}	28	(South Africa) Sharks Women

=== United States ===
The United States announced their final squad on 18 September 2023.

Head coach: (United States) Richard Ashfield

Player	Position	Date of birth (age)	Caps	Club/province
Paige Stathopoulos	Hooker		1	(United States) Beantown RFC
Kathryn Treder	Hooker	17 March 1996 (aged 27)	13	(England) Loughborough Lightning
Catherine Benson	Prop	10 February 1992 (aged 31)	37	(England) Sale Sharks
Charli Jacoby	Prop	9 October 1989 (aged 34)	21	(United States) Colorado Graywolves
Keia Mae Sagapolu	Prop	12 May 2000 (aged 23)	3	(England) Leicester Tigers
Monalisa Tupou	Prop	19 February 2002 (aged 21)	3	(United States) Life West Gladiatrix/EPA Razorbacks
Erica Jarrell	Second row	25 February 1999 (aged 24)	2	(United States) Beantown RFC
Jenny Kronish	Second row	27 December 1996 (aged 26)	9	(United States) Beantown RFC
Hallie Taufo'ou	Second row	26 May 1994 (aged 29)	11	(United States) Beantown RFC
Rachel Ehrecke	Flanker	6 December 1999 (aged 23)	7	(United States) Colorado Graywolves
Rachel Johnson	Flanker	5 February 1991 (aged 32)	22	(England) Exeter Chiefs
Freda Tafuna	Flanker	31 August 2003 (aged 20)	3	(United States) Lindenwood University
Kate Zackary	Number 8	26 July 1989 (aged 34)	32	(England) Ealing Trailfinders
Tahlia Brody	Back row	10 September 1994 (aged 29)	4	(England) Leicester Tigers
Taina Tukuafu	Scrum-half	18 August 2001 (aged 22)	3	(United States) Lindenwood University
Carly Waters	Scrum-half	19 December 1995 (aged 27)	20	(United States) Colorado Graywolves
Gabby Cantorna	Fly-half	2 August 1995 (aged 28)	21	(England) Exeter Chiefs
Emily Henrich	Centre	10 November 1999 (aged 23)	10	(United States) Beantown RFC
Atumata Hingano	Centre	2 August 1998 (aged 25)	0	(United States) USA Sevens
Charlotte Clapp	Wing	13 January 1995 (aged 28)	10	(England) Saracens
Meya Bizer	Fullback	10 May 1993 (aged 30)	30	(England) Ealing Trailfinders
Tess Feury	Fullback	15 March 1996 (aged 27)	19	(England) Leicester Tigers
Bulou Mataitoga	Fullback	8 April 1994 (aged 29)	11	(United States) Berkeley All Blues

== WXV 3 ==
=== Colombia ===
Colombia announced their final squad on 21 September 2023.

Head coach: (Colombia) Lissette Martínez

Player	Position	Date of birth (age)	Caps	Club/province
Camila Cardona	??	{{{age}}}		
Carolina Naranjo	??	{{{age}}}		
Daniela Roman	??	{{{age}}}		
Tatiana Delgado	??	{{{age}}}		
Gisel Gómez	Flanker	26 October 1999 (aged 23)		
Leidy Garcia	Wing	31 July 1990 (aged 33)		
María Cortes	Hooker	27 November 2001 (aged 21)		
Natalia Caycedo	??	{{{age}}}		
Velentina Yepes	??	{{{age}}}		
Angie Manyoma	Centre	24 October 1999 (aged 23)		
Tatiana Hernandez	Number 8	25 May 1993 (aged 30)		
Paola Delgado	??	{{{age}}}		
Sara Vélez	??	{{{age}}}		
Silvia Olave	Hooker	13 November 2001 (aged 21)		
Sofía Granados	??	{{{age}}}		
Camila Lopera	Wing	18 April 1995 (aged 28)		
Isabel Ramirez	??	{{{age}}}		(Colombia) Juncos RC
Juliana Soto	Flanker	20 May 1999 (aged 24)		
Laura Gutierrez	??	{{{age}}}		
Maribel Mestra	??	13 July 2001 (aged 22)		
Melisa Rios	??	{{{age}}}		
Stefanía Sarmiento	??	{{{age}}}		(Colombia) Juncos RC
Valentina Álvarez	Wing	4 April 2000 (aged 23)		
Valeria Cuartas	Prop	28 October 2001 (aged 21)		
Ángela Alzate	Centre	24 November 1995 (aged 27)		
Luisa Zurique	??	{{{age}}}		
María Arzuaga	??	15 April 1998 (aged 25)		
Andrea Ramirez	Prop	11 August 1999 (aged 24)		
Natalia Barajas	Hooker	11 November 1990 (aged 32)		
Alejandra Villota	??	{{{age}}}		

=== Fiji ===
Fiji announced their final squad on 3 October 2023.

Head coach: (Fiji) Inoke Male

Player	Position	Date of birth (age)	Caps	Club/province
Bitila Tawake	Hooker	2 April 1999 (aged 24)	6	(Fiji) Fijiana Drua
Penina Turova	Hooker	{{{age}}}	0	(England) Worcester Warriors
Ana Korovata	Prop	{{{age}}}		
Karalaini Naisewa	Prop	{{{age}}}		
Merevesi Ofakimalino	Lock	30 March 1994 (aged 29)	5	(Fiji) Fijiana Drua
Doreen Narokete	Lock	{{{age}}}		(Fiji) Fijiana Drua
Sulita Waisega	Lock	{{{age}}}		
Mereoni Nakesa	Lock	{{{age}}}		
Sereima Leweniqila (c)	Loose forward	5 May 1990 (aged 33)	8	
Teresia Tinanivalu	Loose forward	{{{age}}}		
Rusila Nagasau	Loose forward	4 August 1987 (aged 36)		
Salanieta Nabuli	Forward	{{{age}}}		
Tiana Robanakadavu	Forward	{{{age}}}		
Unaisi Lalabalavu	Forward	{{{age}}}	0	
Nunia Daunimoala	Forward	{{{age}}}		
Adi Fulori Rotagavira	Forward	{{{age}}}		
Setaita Railumu	Scrum-half	{{{age}}}		
Jennifer Goodsir Ravutia	Fly-half	{{{age}}}		
Vani Arei	Centre	{{{age}}}		
Merewai Cumu	Centre	31 August 1997 (aged 26)		
Adita Milinia	Wing	{{{age}}}		
Iva Sauira	Wing	{{{age}}}	0	(New Zealand) Tasman Mako
Luisa Tisolo	Fullback	20 September 1991 (aged 32)		
Mary Kanace	Fullback	{{{age}}}	0	(New Zealand) Linwood Rugby Club
Merewairita Neivosa	Back	{{{age}}}		
Evivi Senikarivi	Back	{{{age}}}		
Salanieta Kinita	Back	{{{age}}}		
Loraini Senivutu	??	{{{age}}}	0	
Wainikiti Vosadrau	??	{{{age}}}		
Atelaite Buna	??	{{{age}}}		

=== Ireland ===
Ireland announced their final squad on 26 September 2023.

^{1} On 17 October 2023, Aoife Doyle was replaced by Clara Nielson due to an injury.

Head coach: (England) Scott Bemand

Player	Position	Date of birth (age)	Caps	Club/province
Clara Nielson^{1}	Hooker	22 October 1992 (aged 30)	5	(England) Exeter Chiefs
Christy Haney	Prop	2 February 1994 (aged 29)	10	(Ireland) Blackrock College RFC / Leinster
Linda Djougang	Prop	17 May 1996 (aged 27)	29	(Ireland) Old Belvedere RFC / Leinster
Niamh O'Dowd	Prop	21 April 2000 (aged 23)	1	(Ireland) Old Belvedere RFC / Leinster
Sadhbh McGrath	Prop	30 August 2004 (aged 19)	5	(Ireland) MU Barnhall RFC / Cooke RFC / Ulster
Sam Monaghan (cc)	Second row	25 June 1993 (aged 30)	15	(England) Gloucester-Hartpury
Grace Moore	Back row	21 May 1996 (aged 27)	10	(England) Saracens
Maeve Óg O'Leary	Back row	6 March 2000 (aged 23)	4	(Ireland) Blackrock College RFC / Munster
Aoife Wafer	Back row	25 March 2003 (aged 20)	1	(Ireland) Blackrock College RFC / Leinster
Brittany Hogan	Back row	19 September 1998 (aged 25)	15	(Ireland) Old Belvedere RFC / Ulster
Dorothy Wall	Back row	4 May 2000 (aged 23)	20	(Ireland) Blackrock College RFC / Munster
Edel McMahon (cc)	Back row	25 March 1994 (aged 29)	21	(England) Exeter Chiefs
Eimear Corri	Forward	9 April 1998 (aged 25)	0	(Ireland) Blackrock College RFC / Leinster
Fiona Tuite	Forward	27 December 1996 (aged 26)	0	(Ireland) Old Belvedere RFC / Ulster
Megan Collis	Forward	6 December 2001 (aged 21)	0	(Ireland) Railway Union RFC / Leinster
Neve Jones	Forward	26 December 1998 (aged 24)	18	(England) Gloucester-Hartpury
Ruth Campbell	Forward	27 June 2003 (aged 20)	0	(Ireland) MU Barnhall RFC / Leinster
Sarah Delaney	Forward	8 December 2004 (aged 18)	0	(Ireland) Cill Dara RFC / Leinster
Aoibheann Reilly	Scrum-half	1 November 2000 (aged 22)	4	(Ireland) Blackrock College RFC / Connacht
Molly Scuffil-McCabe	Scrum-half	15 March 1998 (aged 25)	9	(Ireland) Railway Union RFC / Leinster
Dannah O'Brien	Fly-half	22 September 2003 (aged 20)	7	(Ireland) Old Belvedere RFC / Leinster
Nicole Fowley	Fly-half	23 December 1992 (aged 30)	8	(Ireland) Galwegians RFC / Connacht
Aoife Dalton	Centre	3 May 2003 (aged 20)	7	(Ireland) Old Belvedere RFC / Leinster
Eve Higgins	Centre	23 June 1999 (aged 24)	9	(Ireland) Railway Union RFC / Leinster
Aoife Doyle^{1}	Wing	2 June 1995 (aged 28)	17	(Ireland) Railway Union RFC / Munster
Béibhinn Parsons	Wing	30 November 2001 (aged 21)	18	(Ireland) Blackrock College RFC / Connacht
Natasja Behan	Wing	18 February 2000 (aged 23)	7	(Ireland) Blackrock College RFC / Leinster
Clara Barrett	Back	19 January 2004 (aged 19)	0	(Ireland) UL Bohemian RFC / Connacht
Katie Whelan	Back	27 February 2003 (aged 20)	0	(Ireland) Old Belvedere RFC / Leinster
Leah Tarpey	Back	25 August 2003 (aged 20)	2	(Ireland) Railway Union RFC / Leinster
Méabh Deely	Fullback	25 October 2000 (aged 22)	7	(Ireland) Blackrock College RFC / Connacht

=== Kazakhstan ===
Kazakhstan announced their final squad.

Head coach: (Kazakhstan) Makhabbat Tugambekova

Player	Position	Date of birth (age)	Caps	Club/province
Karina Sazontova (c)	Back row	{{{age}}}		(Kazakhstan) Almaty
Darya Simakova	Lock	22 November 2001 (aged 21)		
Natalya Kamendrovskaya	Prop	16 April 1990 (aged 33)		(Kazakhstan) Olymp
Symbat Zhamankulova	Back row	16 June 1991 (aged 32)	14	
Yelena Yurova	Prop	{{{age}}}		
Karina Tankisheva	Forward	{{{age}}}		(Kazakhstan) Jambyl Region
Irina Balabina	Forward	{{{age}}}		
Moldir Askhat	Hooker	{{{age}}}		
Balzhan Akhbayeva	Forward	{{{age}}}		
Kuralay Turalykova	Forward	{{{age}}}		
Yuliya Oleinikova	Forward	{{{age}}}		
Anna Chebotar	Lock	3 July 1989 (aged 34)	0	(Russia) CSKA
Lyudmila Ivanova	Centre	14 November 1993 (aged 29)		
Tatyana Dadajanova	Forward	29 January 2003 (aged 20)	0	(Russia) Zilant
Xeniya Chertova	Forward	{{{age}}}		
Svetlana Malezhina	Back row	{{{age}}}	1	
Rigina Bainazarova	Back	{{{age}}}		
Daiana Kazibekova	Scrum-half	12 August 1999 (aged 24)		
Daria Kuznetsova	Back	13 May 2003 (aged 20)	0	(Russia) Argat
Kundyzay Baktybayeva	Fly-half	27 March 1989 (aged 34)		
Liliya Kibisheva	Wing	30 January 1989 (aged 34)		(Kazakhstan) Olymp
Darya Tkachyova	Wing	9 September 1993 (aged 30)		
Eva Bekker	Centre	17 August 1995 (aged 28)		
Tatyana Kruchinkina	Back row	22 September 2000 (aged 23)	0	(Russia) Argat
Milana Kotova	Back	{{{age}}}		
Anastassiya Yevdokimova	Back	{{{age}}}		(Kazakhstan) Kostanay Region
Milana Alayeva	Back	{{{age}}}		(Kazakhstan) Almaty
Alyona Melnikova	Back	{{{age}}}		
Kamila Alseitova	Back	{{{age}}}		(Kazakhstan) Jambyl Region
Gulim Bakytpek	Fullback	{{{age}}}		(Kazakhstan) Olymp

=== Kenya ===
Kenya announced their final squad on 3 October 2023.

Head coach: (Kenya) Dennis Mwanja

Player	Position	Date of birth (age)	Caps	Club/province
Rose Otieno	??	{{{age}}}		
Knight Otwoma	??	{{{age}}}		
Natasha Emali	??	{{{age}}}		
Helsa Khisa	??	{{{age}}}		
Faith Livoi	??	{{{age}}}		
Enid Ouma (c)	Flanker	{{{age}}}		
Diana Kemunto	??	{{{age}}}		
Naomi Jelagat	??	{{{age}}}		
Winnie Owino	??	{{{age}}}		
Ann Goretti	??	{{{age}}}		
Angel Charity Juma	??	{{{age}}}		
Laureen Akoth	??	{{{age}}}		
Priscah Nyerere	??	{{{age}}}		
Freshia Awino	??	{{{age}}}		
Diana Omoso	??	{{{age}}}		
Naomi Muhanji	??	{{{age}}}		
Evelyn Kalamera	??	{{{age}}}		
Mercy Migingo	??	{{{age}}}		
Stacy Atieno	??	{{{age}}}		
Michelle Akinyi	??	{{{age}}}		
Edith Narlaka	??	{{{age}}}		
Jiveti Daisy Osore	??	{{{age}}}		
Lewin Amazimbi	??	{{{age}}}		
Valentine Otieno	??	{{{age}}}		
Maureen Chebet	??	{{{age}}}		
Grace Okulu	Fly-half	16 March 1998 (aged 25)		
Judith Okumu	??	12 July 1998 (aged 25)		
Phoebe Akinyi	??	{{{age}}}		
Terry Ayesa	??	{{{age}}}		
Sharon Auma	??	{{{age}}}		

=== Spain ===
Spain announced their final squad on 2 October 2023.

Head coach: (Spain) Juan González Marruecos

Player	Position	Date of birth (age)	Caps	Club/province
María de las Huertas Román	Hooker	12 February 1999 (aged 24)	10	(Spain) Ghenova Cocos
Inés Antolínez	Prop	16 January 1997 (aged 26)	26	(Spain) Crealia El Salvador
Sidorella Bracic	Prop	12 June 1993 (aged 30)	12	(Spain) Olímpico de Pozuelo
Mireia de Andrés	Prop	14 January 2017 (aged 6)	0	(Spain) Sant Cugat
Laura Delgado	Prop	7 April 1990 (aged 33)	32	(England) Gloucester-Hartpury
Marta Estellés	Prop	2 January 1994 (aged 29)	11	(Spain) Silicius Majadahonda
Lourdes Alameda	Second row	28 July 1991 (aged 32)	28	(France) AC Bobigny 93 Rugby
Leyre Bianchi	Second row	20 January 1996 (aged 27)	1	(Spain) CRAT Residencia Rialta
Carmen Castellucci	Second row	26 August 2002 (aged 21)	14	(England) Gloucester-Hartpury
Anna Puig	Second row	14 October 1999 (aged 23)	25	(Spain) UE Santboiana
Cristina Blanco	Back row	30 September 1995 (aged 28)	15	(England) Ealing Trailfinders
María Calvo	Back row	16 February 1999 (aged 24)	22	(Spain) Complutense Cisneros
Alba Capell	Back row	28 October 2003 (aged 19)	9	(France) Stade Rennais Rugby
María del Castillo	Back row	11 January 1996 (aged 27)	6	(Spain) Olímpico de Pozuelo
Nerea García	Back row	17 November 1996 (aged 26)	4	(Spain) Eibar RT
Vico Gorrochategui	Back row	16 April 1994 (aged 29)	4	(Spain) Silicius Majadahonda
Beatriz Rivera	Back row	26 February 2002 (aged 21)	0	(Spain) Crealia El Salvador
Julia Castro	Scrum-half	8 November 1999 (aged 23)	7	(Spain) Ghenova Cocos
Bingbing Vergara	Scrum-half	31 May 2004 (aged 19)	1	(Spain) Crealia El Salvador
Maider Aresti	Half-back	24 July 2003 (aged 20)	6	(Spain) Getxo Giroa - Veolia
Inés Bueso-Inchausti	Fly-half	9 November 1999 (aged 23)	13	(Spain) Sant Cugat
Zahía Pérez	Fly-half	14 January 2004 (aged 19)	10	(Spain) Silicius Majadahonda
Tecla Masoko	Wing	20 October 2000 (aged 22)	0	(Spain) Crealia El Salvador
Claudia Pérez	Wing	24 June 2004 (aged 19)	7	(Spain) Silicius Majadahonda
Alba Vinuesa	Wing	30 March 1999 (aged 24)	16	(France) Stade Français Paris
Claudia Peña	Centre	26 October 2004 (aged 18)	7	(Spain) AVR FC Barcelona
Iciar Pozo	Centre	24 June 2000 (aged 23)	8	(Spain) CRAT Residencia Rialta
Amalia Argudo	Fullback	24 January 2000 (aged 23)	7	(France) Stade Toulousain
Jimena Blanco Hortiguera	Fullback	1 December 2005 (aged 17)	1	(Spain) Silicius Majadahonda
Clara Piquero	Fullback	11 February 1999 (aged 24)	10	(France) Lons Section paloise
