= 2024 Asia Rugby Women's Championship =

13th edition of the Asia Rugby Women's Championship

Tournament details
- Host: Hong Kong
- Date: 22 May–1 June 2024
- Countries: Hong Kong; Japan; Kazakhstan

Final positions
- Champions: Japan
- Runner-up: Hong Kong

The 2024 Asia Rugby Women's Championship was the 13th edition of the Asia Rugby Women's Championship, it will take place from 22 May to 1 June 2024 and will be hosted in Hong Kong. The champion will qualify for the 2024 WXV 2 and the 2025 Women's Rugby World Cup tournaments. The runner-up will qualify for the 2024 WXV 3 and will have a chance of qualifying for the 2025 World Cup as the remaining six places will be awarded to the highest-finishing teams in WXV who have not qualified through the 2021 Rugby World Cup and the regional tournaments.

Japan secured their sixth Asia Rugby Women's Championship title and qualification for both the 2025 Women's Rugby World Cup and the 2024 WXV 2 tournaments. Hong Kong's hopes of making the World Cup were kept alive after they defeated Kazakhstan and earned a spot in WXV 3.

== Standings ==
| Pos | Team | Pld | W | D | L | PF | PA | PD | TF | TA | TB | LB | Pts | Qualification | JPN | HKG | KAZ |
|---|---|---|---|---|---|---|---|---|---|---|---|---|---|---|---|---|---|
| 1 | Japan | 2 | 2 | 0 | 0 | 93 | 12 | +81 | 14 | 2 | 2 | 0 | 10 | Qualifies for the 2025 Women's Rugby World Cup and 2024 WXV 2 | — | | 64–0 |
| 2 | Hong Kong | 2 | 1 | 0 | 1 | 34 | 29 | +5 | 5 | 4 | 0 | 0 | 4 | Qualifies for 2024 WXV 3 | 12–29 | — | 22–0 |
| 3 | Kazakhstan | 2 | 0 | 0 | 2 | 0 | 86 | −86 | 0 | 13 | 0 | 0 | 0 | | | | — |

Updated to match(es) played on 1 June 2024. Source:

== Fixtures ==
22 May 2024
18:30 HKT (UTC+8)

| Hong Kong | 12–29 | Japan |
| Try: Forrest 67' c Chong 78' m Con: Smith (1/2) 69'; Cards: Olson-Thorne (yellow card) 41' to 51' | Report | Try: Kagawa 7' c I. Nagata 25' m N. Nagata 70' c Hatada 76' c Con: Otsuka (3/4) 8', 71', 77'; Pen: Otsuka (1/1) 65' |

Kings Park sportsground, Kings Park
Referee: Christabelle Lim (Singapore)

Team details

| LP | 1 | Nga-wun Lau |
| HK | 2 | Tanya Dhar |
| TP | 3 | Kea Marie Herewini |
| LL | 4 | Chloe Noelle Barcellano Baltazar |
| RL | 5 | Roshini Jane Turner |
| BF | 6 | Tsz-ching Chan |
| OF | 7 | Wai-yan Pun (c) |
| N8 | 8 | Shanna Sanman Forrest |
| SH | 9 | King To Au |
| FH | 10 | Hoi Ching Fung |
| LW | 11 | Zoe Smith |
| IC | 12 | Georgia Rivers |
| OC | 13 | Natasha Olson-Thorne |
| RW | 14 | Ka-yan Chong |
| FB | 15 | Sabay Lynam |
Replacements:
| HK | 16 | Fion Yuei-Tein Got |
| PR | 17 | Hiu Tung Chan |
| PR | 18 | Ka-shun Lee |
| LK | 19 | Mei-nam Chow |
| BR | 20 | Micayla Baltazar |
| SH | 21 | Tsz Yau Wan |
| BK | 22 | Jiayu Qian |
| BK | 23 | Hoi Yan Poon |
Coach:
(Hong Kong) Royce Chan Leong Sze

| LP | 1 | Sachiko Kato |
| HK | 2 | Kotomi Taniguchi |
| TP | 3 | Wako Kitano |
| LL | 4 | Yuna Sato |
| RL | 5 | Otoka Yoshimura |
| BF | 6 | Sakurako Korai |
| OF | 7 | Iroha Nagata (c) |
| N8 | 8 | Ayano Nagai |
| SH | 9 | Moe Tsukui |
| FH | 10 | Ayasa Otsuka |
| LW | 11 | Mele Yua Havili Kagawa |
| IC | 12 | Haruka Hirotsu |
| OC | 13 | Sakurako Hatada |
| RW | 14 | Kotono Yasuo |
| FB | 15 | Komachi Imakugi |
Replacements:
| HK | 16 | Asuka Kuge |
| PR | 17 | Manami Mine |
| PR | 18 | Miharu Machida |
| LK | 19 | Nijiho Nagata |
| BR | 20 | Mio Nishimura |
| SH | 21 | Megumi Abe |
| CE | 22 | Mana Furuta |
| WG | 23 | Nao Ando |
Coach:
(Canada) Lesley Mckenzie

Assistant referees:
James Perry (Singapore)
Darroch Chua (Singapore)
Television match official:
Jaco De Wit (UAE)

27 May 2024
19:00 HKT (UTC+8)

| Japan | 64–0 | Kazakhstan |
| Try: Kato 3' c Hirotsu 7' c Nagai 16' m Nagata 30' m Sato 37' c Yoshimura 52' c Mine 55' m Abe 61' c Machida 72' c Otsuka 76' c Con: Otsuka (7/10) 4', 8', 38', 53', 62', 73', 77'; Cards: Yoshimura (yellow card) 21' to 31' | Report | Cards: Dadajanova (yellow card) 19' to 29'; Melnikova (yellow card) 28' to 38' |

Kings Park sportsground, Kings Park
Referee: Sunny Lee (Hong Kong)

Team details

| LP | 1 | Sachiko Kato |
| HK | 2 | Kotomi Taniguchi |
| TP | 3 | Wako Kitano |
| LL | 4 | Yuna Sato |
| RL | 5 | Otoka Yoshimura |
| BF | 6 | Sakurako Korai |
| OF | 7 | Iroha Nagata |
| N8 | 8 | Ayano Nagai |
| SH | 9 | Moe Tsukui |
| FH | 10 | Ayasa Otsuka |
| LW | 11 | Kotono Yasuo |
| IC | 12 | Haruka Hirotsu |
| OC | 13 | Sakurako Hatada |
| RW | 14 | Komachi Imakugi |
| FB | 15 | Sora Nishimura |
Replacements:
| HK | 16 | Asuka Kuge |
| PR | 17 | Manami Mine |
| PR | 18 | Miharu Machida |
| LK | 19 | Nijiho Nagata |
| LF | 20 | Mio Nishimura |
| SH | 21 | Megumi Abe |
| BK | 22 | Mana Furuta |
| BK | 23 | Nao Ando |
Coach:
(Canada) Lesley Mckenzie

| LP | 1 | Natalya Kamendrovskaya (c) |
| HK | 2 | Xeniya Kim |
| TP | 3 | Tatyana Dadajanova |
| LL | 4 | Symbat Zhamankulova |
| RL | 5 | Daiana Kazibekova |
| BF | 6 | Mariya Grishina |
| OF | 7 | Veronika Stepanyuga |
| N8 | 8 | Anzhelika Pichugina |
| SH | 9 | Yekaterina Savina |
| FH | 10 | Diana Abisheva |
| LW | 11 | Alena Melnikova |
| IC | 12 | Anna Melnikova |
| OC | 13 | Yeva Bekker |
| RW | 14 | Amina Tulegenova |
| FB | 15 | Galina Krassavina |
Replacements:
| HK | 16 | Svetlana Malezhina |
| PR | 17 | Darya Tkachyova |
| PR | 18 | Darya Simakova |
| LK | 19 | Balzhan Akhbayeva |
| LF | 20 | Alyona Drobovskaya |
| SH | 21 | Luidmila Ivanova |
| BK | 22 | Kundyzay Baktybayeva |
| BK | 23 | Yuliya Oleinikova |
Coach:
(South Africa) Fabian Jouries

Assistant referees:
Morgan White (Hong Kong)
Aggie Poon (Hong Kong)
Television match official:
Stephen Copeman (Hong Kong)

1 June 2024
18:30 HKT (UTC+8)

| Hong Kong | 22–0 | Kazakhstan |
| Try: Chong 21' c Olson-Thorne 50' m Lau 59' c Con: Smith (2/3) 22', 60'; Pen: Smith (1/1) 44' | Report |

Hong Kong Football Club Stadium
Referee: Tasuku Kawahara (Japan)

Team details

| LP | 1 | Nga-wun Lau |
| HK | 2 | Tanya Dhar |
| TP | 3 | Kea Marie Herewini |
| LL | 4 | Chloe Noelle Barcellano Baltazar |
| RL | 5 | Roshini Jane Turner |
| BF | 6 | Tsz-ching Chan |
| OF | 7 | Wai-yan Pun (c) |
| N8 | 8 | Shanna Sanman Forrest |
| SH | 9 | King To Au |
| FH | 10 | Hoi Ching Fung |
| LW | 11 | Zoe Smith |
| IC | 12 | Georgia Rivers |
| OC | 13 | Natasha Olson-Thorne |
| RW | 14 | Ka-yan Chong |
| FB | 15 | Hoi Yan Poon |
Replacements:
| HK | 16 | Fion Yuei-Tein Got |
| PR | 17 | Hiu Tung Chan |
| PR | 18 | Ka-shun Lee |
| LK | 19 | Mei-nam Chow |
| BR | 20 | Karen Hoi Ting So |
| SH | 21 | Micayla Baltazar |
| BK | 22 | Jiayu Qian |
| BK | 23 | Tsz Yau Wan |
Coach:
(Hong Kong) Royce Chan Leong-sze

| LP | 1 | Natalya Kamendrovskaya (c) |
| HK | 2 | Xeniya Kim |
| TP | 3 | Tatyana Dadajanova |
| LL | 4 | Symbat Zhamankulova |
| RL | 5 | Luidmila Ivanova |
| BF | 6 | Mariya Grishina |
| OF | 7 | Veronika Stepanyuga |
| N8 | 8 | Anzhelika Pichugina |
| SH | 9 | Yekaterina Savina |
| FH | 10 | Diana Abisheva |
| LW | 11 | Liliya Kibisheva |
| IC | 12 | Anna Melnikova |
| OC | 13 | Yeva Bekker |
| RW | 14 | Amina Tulegenova |
| FB | 15 | Galina Krassavina |
Replacements:
| HK | 16 | Svetlana Malezhina |
| PR | 17 | Darya Tkachyova |
| PR | 18 | Darya Simakova |
| LK | 19 | Daiana Kazibekova |
| LF | 20 | Alyona Drobovskaya |
| SH | 21 | Kundyzay Baktybayeva |
| BK | 22 | Alena Melnikova |
| BK | 23 | Yuliya Oleinikova |
Coach:
(South Africa) Fabian Juries

Assistant referees:
Koki Yamauchi (Japan)
Tetsuya Hirakawa (Japan)
Television match official:
Just Wang (Singapore)
