= Mele Yua Havili Kagawa =

Japan international rugby union player

- Born: 29 September 2001 (age 25)
- Height: 171 cm (5 ft 7 in)
- Weight: 75 kg (165 lb; 11 st 11 lb)

Rugby union career
- Position: Wing
Senior career
Years	Team	Apps	(Points)
2024–	Nanairo Prism Fukuoka		
International career
Years	Team	Apps	(Points)
2024–	Japan	7	(25)
National sevens team
Years	Team		Comps
- Japan 7s

Mele Yua Havili Kagawa (born 29 September 2001) is a Japanese rugby union player. She competed for Japan at the 2025 Women's Rugby World Cup.

== Early career ==
Kagawa was born to a Tongan father and a Japanese mother, she started playing rugby at the age of 8. She also participated in swimming from the fourth to sixth grade of elementary school, she competed in the freestyle category and took part in the Junior Olympics. She took up athletics in junior high school to develop her speed and recorded a personal best time of 12.9 seconds in the 100 metres, she won the prefectural relay championship.

In 2020, after graduating from Kumagaya Girls' High School, she enrolled at the Faculty of Sport Sciences at Waseda University. After she graduated from university, she studied abroad in New Zealand and the United States.

== Rugby career ==
=== Sevens ===
Kagawa was still in high school when she made her international sevens debut for Japan at 17. She was selected as a backup member for the side to the delayed Tokyo Olympics in 2021. She joined Nanairo Prism Fukuoka in 2024.

=== XVs ===
Kagawa switched to playing fifteens in 2024 and initially started out in the Back row. She scored a try in her test debut for Japan as a Winger against Hong Kong in May during the 2024 Asia Rugby Championship. She has played for Arukas Queen Kumagaya.

In July 2025, she scored two tries against Spain in the second game of their two-test series. On 28 July, she was subsequently named in the Japanese side to the Women's Rugby World Cup in England.

== Personal life ==
Kagawa's father, Tuanaki Havili Kaufusi, played as Number 8 for Otsuka Hake. In 2023, she visited Tonga for the first time in 12 years.
