= Lee Ka-shun =

HK international rugby union player

- Born: 24 March 1989 (age 37) Hong Kong
- Height: 1.65 m (5 ft 5 in)
- Weight: 80 kg (176 lb)

Rugby union career
- Position: Prop
Amateur team(s)
Years	Team	Apps	(Points)
2009-2025	Gai Wu		
International career
Years	Team	Apps	(Points)
2010–2025	Hong Kong	34	(0)

Lee Ka-shun (born 24 March 1989) is a Hong Kong rugby union player. She represented Hong Kong at the 2017 Women's Rugby World Cup in Ireland.

In 2024, Lee Ka Shun became Hong Kong China's most capped female player during the WXV3 tournament in Dubai, she played her 34th test against Fiji.

== Early career ==
Lee is the former record holder for women's Discus in Hong Kong. She participanted the East Asian Games 2009 in Hong Kong.

== Rugby career ==
Lee made her international debut for Hong Kong in 2010. She featured for Hong Kong at the 2014 Asia Women's Four Nations and the 2016 Asia Rugby Women's Championship. In 2016, she played against Fiji in a repechage match for the 2017 World Cup.

Lee was selected for Hong Kong's tour of Spain before the World Cup in 2017. She was selected in Hong Kong's historic side that debuted at the 2017 Women's Rugby World Cup.

In 2019, she was part of the squad that beat Netherlands in a two-match series and claimed Hong Kong's first test series win in Europe. She scored a try in the second half of the first test to help her side beat the Dutch women 14–12.

She was named in the squad that played in a two-test series against Kazakhstan in December 2022.

In 2024, she was named as a reserve in the opening match of the Asia Championship against Japan. On 28 September, she became Hong Kong China's most capped female player in fifteens, she earned her 34th cap at the WXV 3 tournament against Fiji.
