= Pun Wai-yan =

- Born: 6 April 1995 (age 31)
- Height: 1.64 m (5 ft 5 in)
- Weight: 67 kg (148 lb)

Rugby union career
- Position: Flanker
International career
| Years | Team | Apps | (Points) |
- Hong Kong

Pun Wai-yan (born 6 April 1995) is a Hong Kong rugby union player. She competed for Hong Kong at the 2017 Women's Rugby World Cup in Ireland.

== Rugby career ==
Pun featured for Hong Kong in two matches against Japan at the 2017 Asia Rugby Championship. She was part of Hong Kong's historic side that debuted at the 2017 Women's Rugby World Cup.

In 2018, she toured Europe and played in tests against Wales and Spain. The 2019 Asia Pacific Championship saw her play Fiji and Samoa in Lautoka.

In 2024, she was named in the starting line-up for the opening match against Japan at the Asia Rugby Championship.
