= Chow Mei-nam =

Hong Kong rugby union player (born 1988)

- Born: 14 November 1988 (age 37)
- Height: 1.7 m (5 ft 7 in)
- Weight: 69 kg (152 lb)

Rugby union career
- Position: Lock
International career
Years	Team	Apps	(Points)
2015–	Hong Kong		
National sevens team
Years	Team		Comps
2021	Hong Kong		

Chow Mei-nam (born 14 November 1988) is a Hong Kong rugby union player. She captained Hong Kong in their 2017 Rugby World Cup debut in Ireland.

== Personal life ==
Chow is a P.E. teacher at Helen Liang Memorial Secondary School (Shatin).

== Rugby career ==
=== Sevens ===
Chow made her rugby sevens debut at the Olympic Repechage tournament in Monaco in 2021.

=== XVs ===
Chow made her international debut for Hong Kong against Japan in 2015. She captained the side in their historic debut at the 2017 Rugby World Cup. After the 2017 World Cup she spent some time in New Zealand and played for College Rifles RFC.

Chow was named in the squad that played in a two-test series against Kazakhstan in December 2022. In 2024, she was named as a reserve in the opening match of the Asia Rugby Championship against Japan.
