= Agnes Chan (rugby union) =

HK international rugby union player

- Born: 14 March 1996 (age 30)
- Height: 1.64 m (5 ft 5 in)
- Weight: 58 kg (128 lb)

Rugby union career
- Position: Flanker
International career
Years	Team	Apps	(Points)
- Hong Kong
National sevens team
Years	Team		Comps
2018	Hong Kong		

Agnes Chan Tsz-ching (born 14 March 1996) is a Hong Kong rugby union and sevens player. She competed for Hong Kong in the 2017 Women's Rugby World Cup in Ireland.

== Rugby career ==
=== Sevens ===
In 2018, Chan made her Hong Kong's sevens debut which was a qualifying event for the 2018–19 Women's Sevens Series. She featured in the 2019 Hong Kong Sevens as her side tried to qualify as a core team for the 2019–20 Women's Sevens Series.

She was named in Hong Kong's sevens squad to the 2021 Asia Women's Sevens Series which acted as a qualifier for the 2022 Sevens World Cup and a seeding event for the 2022 Asian Games. Unfortunately Hong Kong won bronze and did not qualify.

=== XVs ===
Chan was a member of Hong Kong's historic squad that debuted at the 2017 Women's Rugby World Cup in Ireland.

She was named in the side that played in a two-test series against Kazakhstan in December 2022. In 2024, she started in the opening match of the Asia Rugby Championship against Japan.
