= Nao Ando =

Japan international rugby union player

- Born: 17 July 2001 (age 25)
- Height: 169 cm (5 ft 7 in)
- Weight: 64 kg (141 lb; 10 st 1 lb)

Rugby union career
- Position: Centre
Senior career
Years	Team	Apps	(Points)
2020–	Brave Louve		
International career
Years	Team	Apps	(Points)
2023–	Japan	12	(10)

Nao Ando (born 17 July 2001) is a Japanese rugby union player. She competed for Japan at the 2025 Women's Rugby World Cup.

== Early life and career ==
Ando started playing rugby at the age of four with the Kamariya Tag Rugby Club in Kanagawa Prefecture. She graduated from Nippon Taiiku Ebara High School in 2020 and then enrolled at Tokyo Ariake University of Health and Medical Sciences, where she studied acupuncture and moxibustion.

== Career ==
Ando joined Brave Louve in 2020. In 2021, she was called up to the TID youth team training camp for the 15-a-side women's team.

On May 28, 2023, she earned her first cap for Japan against Kazakhstan in the Asia Rugby Women's Championship final. She also played for the side in the inaugural 2023 WXV 2 tournament in South Africa, she scored a try against Samoa in their 32–10 victory.

She featured for the Sakura's during the 2024 Asian Championship.

On 28 July 2025, she was named in the Japanese side to the Women's Rugby World Cup in England.
