= Miharu Machida =

Japan international rugby union player

- Born: 26 May 2004 (age 22) Kitakyushu, Fukuoka
- Height: 172 cm (5 ft 8 in)
- Weight: 90 kg (198 lb; 14 st 2 lb)

Rugby union career
- Position: Prop
International career
Years	Team	Apps	(Points)
2024–	Japan	4	(5)

Miharu Machida (born 26 May 2004) is a Japanese rugby union player. She competed for Japan at the 2025 Women's Rugby World Cup.

== Early life and career ==
Machida attended Saga Technical High School and graduated in 2023. While in High school she played in the Under-18 Hanazono Women's 15-a-side team. She enrolled at Japan University of Economics.

== Rugby career ==
On 27 May 2024, she scored a try during her international debut for Japan against Kazakhstan in the Asia Rugby Championship.

In 2025, she started against Kazakhstan and Hong Kong in the Asian Championships. On 28 July, she was named in the Japanese side to the Women's Rugby World Cup in England.
