= Manami Mine =

Japan international rugby union player

- Born: 11 September 2003 (age 23)
- Height: 163 cm (5 ft 4 in)
- Weight: 77 kg (170 lb; 12 st 2 lb)

Rugby union career
- Position: Prop
International career
Years	Team	Apps	(Points)
2023–	Japan	15	(5)

Manami Mine (born 11 September 2003) is a Japanese rugby union player. She competed for Japan at the 2025 Women's Rugby World Cup.

== Background ==
Mine started playing rugby at Sasebo Rugby School in Nagasaki. She also participated in karate and judo from elementary school through junior high school.

She graduated from Saga Technical High School in 2022 and entered Nippon Sport Science University.

== Rugby career ==
On 28 May 2023, she earned her first Test cap for Japan against Kazakhstan in the Asia Rugby Championship final.

Mine scored a try in her sides 64–0 thrashing of Kazakhstan in the 2024 Asia Rugby Women's Championship.

On 28 July 2025, she was named in the Japanese side to the Women's Rugby World Cup in England.
