= Haruka Hirotsu =

Japanese rugby sevens player

- Born: 29 October 2000 (age 26)
- Height: 1.69 m (5 ft 7 in)
- Weight: 68 kg (150 lb)

Rugby union career
- Position: Centre
Senior career
| Years | Team | Apps | (Points) |
| | Nanairo Prism Fukuoka | | (0) |
International career
| Years | Team | Apps | (Points) |
| 2023– | Japan | 20 | (15) |
National sevens team
| Years | Team | | Comps |
| 2020 | Japan 7s | | 4 |

Haruka Hirotsu (弘津悠, born 29 October 2000) is a Japanese rugby union and sevens player. She competed in the women's tournament at the 2020 Summer Olympics.

== Personal life ==
Hirotsu was born in Hyogo and attended Waseda University's School of Sport Sciences in 2019. Her father, Eiji Hirotsu, is a former Japan international and was a member of the Kobe Steel Rugby Club.

== Rugby career ==
=== Sevens ===
In 2019, she was part of the Japan sevens training squad for the Tokyo Olympics. She eventually made the squad and competed in the women's tournament at the delayed 2020 Summer Olympics.

=== XVs ===
Hirotsu was named in Japan's second test against the Fijiana's for 16 September 2023 at Chichibunomiya Rugby Stadium in Tokyo. She also featured in her sides victory against Italy on 30 September. She was named in the Sakura fifteens squad for the inaugural WXV 2 tournament in Cape Town.

She was selected in the Sakura's squad for the 2024 Asia Rugby Championship in Hong Kong. She helped her side secure a place at the 2025 Rugby World Cup and the 2024 WXV 2 tournament with a try in their 64–0 thrashing of Kazakhstan.

In 2025, she was named in the Sakura fifteens squad for their tour to the United States. She eventually started in her sides 39–33 victory over the Eagles in Los Angeles on 26 April.

On 28 July 2025, she was named in the Japanese side to the Women's Rugby World Cup in England.
