= Moe Tsukui =

Japanese rugby union player

- Born: 28 March 2000 (age 26) Takasaki, Gunma, Japan
- Height: 1.53 m (5 ft 0 in)
- Weight: 54 kg (119 lb)

Rugby union career
- Position: Scrum-half
Senior career
Years	Team	Apps	(Points)
	Yokogawa Musashino Artemi-Stars		(0)
International career
Years	Team	Apps	(Points)
2016–	Japan	45	(17)

Moe Tsukui (born 28 March 2000) is a Japanese rugby union player. She plays for Yokogawa Musashino Atlastars and for the Japanese national team. She competed for Japan at the 2017, 2021 and 2025 Women's Rugby World Cups.

== Early life and career ==
Tsukui was born in Takasaki City, Gunma Prefecture. She started playing rugby union at the age of 5 under the influence of her older brother, who was a year older than her, and she began attending Takasaki Rugby School. When she was in junior high school, she joined the track and field club.

Tsukui went to Tokyo University of Agriculture Second High School where she played with the boys. In the spring of 2016, she spent three months studying abroad in New Zealand, improving her passing accuracy and her judgment as a scrum half.

== Rugby career ==
In September 2016, the head coach of the Japanese national team, Takeshi Arimizu, saw Tsukui's play and selected her. She started the World Cup 2017 Asia-Oceania qualifier against Fiji in December of the same year, making her the youngest debut for Japan at the age of 16 years and 8 months.

Tsukui competed at the 2017 Asia Rugby Women's Championship. She was then selected in Japan's squad for the 2017 Rugby World Cup in Ireland. She started in all five games at the World Cup as the ninth scrum-half. She became the youngest player in World Cup history, male or female.

In 2022, Tsukui was selected in Japan's squad for the delayed 2021 Rugby World Cup in New Zealand. She was named in the Sakura XVs squad for the 2024 Asia Rugby Championship.

She was named in the Sakura fifteens squad for their tour to the United States. She eventually started in her sides 39–33 victory over the Eagles in Los Angeles on 26 April 2025. On 28 July 2025, she was named in the Japanese side to the Women's Rugby World Cup in England.
