= Megumi Abe =

Japan international rugby union player

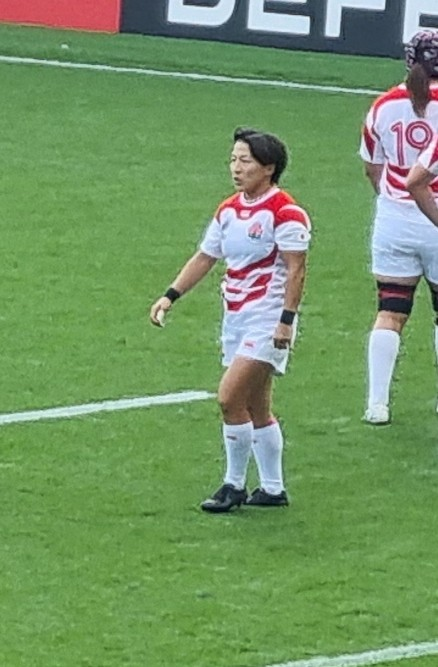
- 2025 Rugby World Cup in Northampton
- Born: 28 April 1998 (age 28)
- Height: 147 cm (4 ft 10 in)
- Weight: 55 kg (121 lb; 8 st 9 lb)

Rugby union career
- Position: Scrum-half
Senior career
Years	Team	Apps	(Points)
	Arukas Queen Kumagaya		(0)
International career
Years	Team	Apps	(Points)
2019–	Japan	36	(10)

Megumi Abe (born 28 April 1998) is a Japanese rugby union player. She competed for Japan at the 2021 and 2025 Women's Rugby World Cups.

== Early career ==
Abe started playing rugby after she quit volleyball at the age of ten while in fourth grade. She attended Iwamichisuikan High School and helped the school's girls sevens team win a national tournament in her third year, she graduated from High School in 2017. She then entered Rissho University where she graduated from in 2021.

== Rugby career ==
On 13 July 2019, she made her international debut for Japan as a starter against Australia.

In 2022, she featured in Japan's historic first test against the Black Ferns ahead of the World Cup. She was selected for Japan's squad to the delayed 2021 Rugby World Cup that was held in New Zealand. She was the smallest player at the tournament. She scored an early try for Japan against the United States in their pool match, however, her side went down 17–30 in the end.

Abe was named the Mastercard player of the match after the Sakura's beat Samoa 32–10 at the inaugural 2023 WXV 2 tournament.

She plays sevens and fifteens for Arukas Queen Kumagaya. In 2024, she scored one of her sides ten tries against Kazakhstan during the Asia Rugby Championship competition which saw Japan qualify for the 2025 Women's Rugby World Cup.

In April 2025, she was named in the squad for their USA tour. On 28 July 2025, she was named in the Sakura's squad to the Women's Rugby World Cup in England.
