= Kanako Kobayashi =

Japan international rugby union player

- Born: 13 November 1998 (age 28)
- Height: 1.62 m (5 ft 4 in)
- Weight: 70 kg (154 lb)

Rugby union career
- Position: Centre
Senior career
Years	Team	Apps	(Points)
2021	Yokogawa Musashino Artemi-Stars		(0)
2021–	Exeter Chiefs	31	(40)
International career
Years	Team	Apps	(Points)
2019–	Japan	21	(30)

Kanako Kobayashi (born 13 November 1998) is a Japanese rugby union player. She plays at center for Japan's women's national rugby union team.

== Early career ==
Kobayashi started playing as a nine year old because there was a rugby pitch near her home in Fujisawa. Her parents were also rugby fans and always encouraged her. She had earned a coveted spot at a high school renowned for producing rugby players in Shimane Prefecture, she then joined Nippon Sport Science University in Tokyo, which also happened to have the strongest women's team in Japan.

== Professional career ==
In 2021, Kobayashi became the fourth Japanese woman to play professionally in England. She signed a one-year contract with the Exeter Chiefs, she joined them straight from the Yokogawa Musashino Artemi-Stars in Japan. In her first season, she scored four tries in 16 appearances and helped Exeter win the Allianz Cup. She missed the entire 2022–23 Premier 15s season due to a serious knee injury.

Kobayashi returned to Exeter for the 2023–24 Premiership Rugby season.

== International career ==
Kobayashi was named in the Sakura fifteens tour of Europe in 2019, and made her test debut in the draw with Italy on 16 November.

In 2021, she was named in Japan's squad for their Autumn Test series in November. She was named on the bench for the test against Wales, but started in the matches against Scotland and Ireland.

On 10 September 2023, Kobayashi scored a try against Fiji in the first test of the Taiyo Seimei Challenge Series; she also made an appearance in the second test. She was then named in the Sakura fifteens side for the inaugural WXV 2 tournament that was held in South Africa in October. She was in the starting line up in the opening match against Italy, and was moved from inside to outside-centre against Samoa for the second round. She was then injured in the final match against Scotland in the 26th minute.

She was named in the Sakura fifteens squad for their tour to the United States in April 2025. She featured for the Sakura's again when they trounced Kazakhstan 90–0 in their opening match of the Asia Rugby Championship a month later, she scored her sides first try.

On 28 July 2025, she was named in the Japanese side to the Women's Rugby World Cup in England.
