= Nijiho Nagata =

Japanese rugby union player

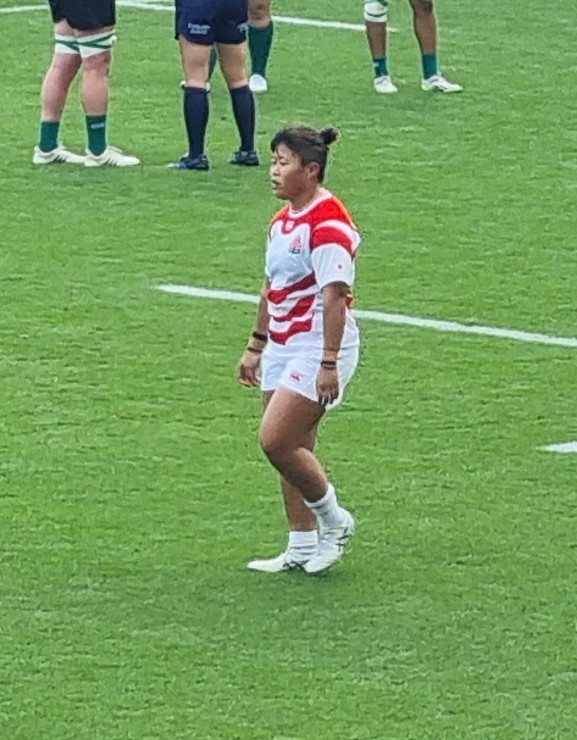
- Nagata during the 2025 Rugby World Cup in Northampton
- Born: 6 December 2000 (age 25)
- Height: 1.62 m (5 ft 4 in)
- Weight: 80 kg (176 lb)

Rugby union career
- Position: Forward
Senior career
Years	Team	Apps	(Points)
	Mie Pearls		(0)
Provincial / State sides
Years	Team	Apps	(Points)
2023	Auckland Storm	6	(5)
Super Rugby
Years	Team	Apps	(Points)
2024	Blues Women	6	(0)
International career
Years	Team	Apps	(Points)
2021–	Japan	32	(15)

Nijiho Nagata ( 永田虹歩 born 6 December 2000) is a Japanese rugby union player, who plays hooker for the Japan women's national rugby union team.

== Rugby career ==
In November 2021, she scored the first try that helped the Sakura's lead Scotland at halftime; however a late Scottish comeback saw her side lose 36–12. She competed at the delayed 2021 Rugby World Cup in New Zealand.

She featured for Japan in the 2023 Asia Rugby Championship. She played for International Budo University and previously played for Auckland Storm in the Farah Palmer Cup.

In September 2023, she was named as a reserve in the test against Fiji in Japan. At the inaugural 2023 WXV 2 tournament, she scored Japan's only try in their defeat to Scotland.

In 2024, Nagata joined the Blues Women in the Super Rugby Aupiki competition as an injury cover for Esther Faiaoga-Tilo. She was named in the Sakura XVs side for the 2024 Asia Rugby Championship. She scored a try in the final 10 minutes of the game to help her side beat Hong Kong China.

She was selected in the Sakura fifteens squad for their tour to the United States in April 2025. On 28 July 2025, she was named in the Japanese side to the Women's Rugby World Cup in England.
