= Yuna Sato =

Japan international rugby union player

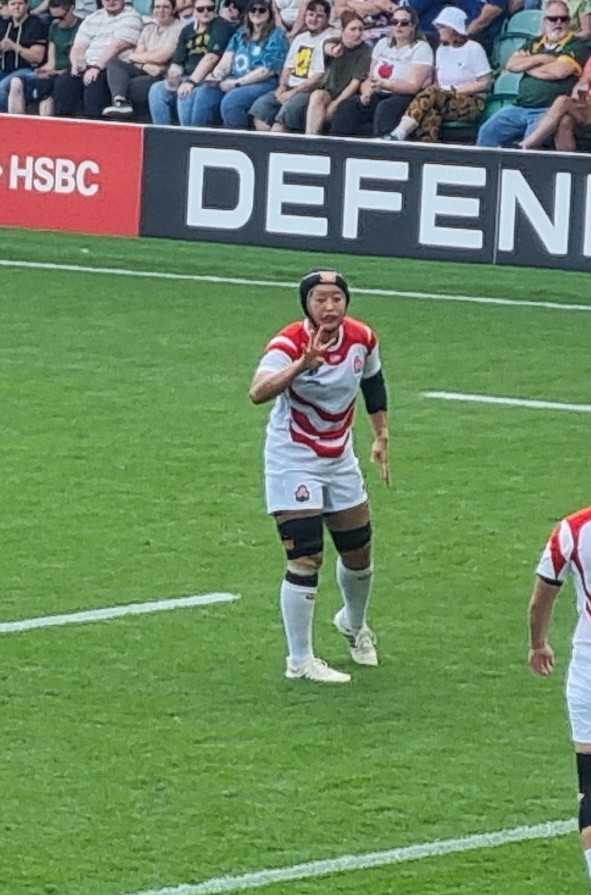
- Sato during the 2025 Rugby World Cup in Northampton
- Born: 11 September 1998 (age 28)
- Height: 1.69 m (5 ft 7 in)
- Weight: 64 kg (141 lb)

Rugby union career
- Position(s): Lock, Loose Forward
Senior career
Years	Team	Apps	(Points)
	Tokyo Sankyu Phoenix		(0)
Super Rugby
Years	Team	Apps	(Points)
2023	Western Force	0	(0)
International career
Years	Team	Apps	(Points)
2019–	Japan	27	(5)

Yuna Sato (born 11 September 1998) is a Japanese rugby union player. She plays Lock internationally for the Japan women's national rugby union team. She competed at the 2021 and the 2025 Women's Rugby World Cups.

== Rugby career ==
Sato featured in Japan's autumn international against Scotland in 2020. In 2021, she was suspended for three weeks following Japan's match against Scotland on 14 November.

Sato started in Japan's historic match against the Black Ferns at Eden Park ahead of the World Cup. She was then named in Japan's squad for the 2021 Rugby World Cup in New Zealand and started in all three of their games.

Sato signed with the Western Force for the 2023 Super W season. She made her Super W debut for Western Force in their opening match against the NSW Waratahs.

She was named in the Sakura XVs side for the 2024 Asia Rugby Championship. Sato scored a try before half-time to help the Sakura's secure their spot at the 2025 Rugby World Cup and the 2024 WXV 2 tournament.

In 2025, she was named in the Sakura fifteens squad for their tour to the United States. She eventually started in her sides 39–33 victory over the Eagles in Los Angeles on 26 April.

On 28 July 2025, she was named in the Japanese side to the Women's Rugby World Cup in England.
