= Ayano Nagai =

Japan international rugby union player (born 1997)

- Born: 14 October 1997 (age 29)
- Height: 1.68 m (5 ft 6 in)
- Weight: 84 kg (185 lb)

Rugby union career
- Position: Loose Forward
Amateur team(s)
Years	Team	Apps	(Points)
2016–2020	Nippon Sport Science University		(0)
Senior career
Years	Team	Apps	(Points)
	Yokohama TKM		(0)
International career
Years	Team	Apps	(Points)
2019–Present	Japan	26	(0)

Ayano Nagai (born 永井彩乃 14 October 1997) is a Japanese rugby union player. She plays for Japan at an international level and competed in the 2021 Rugby World Cup.

== Personal life ==
Nagai graduated from Nippon Sport Science University in 2020.

== Rugby career ==
Nagai plays for Yokohama TKM. In 2022, she featured in the Sakura's victory against Ireland at Prince Chichibu Memorial Stadium. She was later selected in Japan's side for the delayed 2021 Rugby World Cup that was held in New Zealand.

In 2023, she competed at the Asia Rugby Championship. She played for the Sakura's in a non-test match against Spain in Alcobendas. She also featured in the second game against Spain which they won, 27–19.

Nagai was selected in Japan's squad for the 2024 Asia Rugby Championship. Her try in the 16th minute helped her side defeat Kazakhstan and secure a spot at the 2025 Rugby World Cup and the 2024 WXV 2 competition.
