= Jennifer Nduka =

Japan international rugby union player

- Born: 18 October 2000 (age 26)
- Height: 168 cm (5 ft 6 in)
- Weight: 80 kg (176 lb; 12 st 8 lb)

Rugby union career
- Position: Loose Forward
Senior career
Years	Team	Apps	(Points)
2023–	Hokkaido Barbarians Diana		
International career
Years	Team	Apps	(Points)
2023–	Japan	17	(10)

Jennifer Nduka (born 18 October 2000) is a Japanese rugby union player. She competed for Japan at the 2025 Women's Rugby World Cup.

== Early life and career ==
Nduka was born to a Nigerian father and a Japanese mother. Her brothers, Boniface and Charles Nduka, are both football players.

She graduated from Shohei High School in 2019 and entered Ryutsu Keizai University. She played basketball until high school and participated in the Winter Cup. She graduated from Ryutsu Keizai University in 2023.

== Rugby career ==
Nduka joined the Hokkaido Barbarians Diana in 2023, and on 16 September, she made her Test debut for Japan against Fiji.

On 28 July 2025, she was named in the Japanese side to the Women's Rugby World Cup in England. In the Sakura's final pool game against Spain, she scored the last try in her sides first pool match win in 31 years.
