= Otoka Yoshimura =

Japan international rugby union player

- Born: 15 May 2001 (age 25) Kitakyushu, Fukuoka Prefecture
- Height: 174 cm (5 ft 9 in)
- Weight: 83 kg (183 lb; 13 st 1 lb)

Rugby union career
- Position: Lock
Senior career
Years	Team	Apps	(Points)
	Arukas Queen Kumagaya		(0)
International career
Years	Team	Apps	(Points)
2021–	Japan	32	(20)

Otoka Yoshimura (born 15 May 2001) is a Japanese rugby union player. She competed for Japan at the 2021 and 2025 Women's Rugby World Cups.

== Early life and career ==
Yoshimura was born in Kitakyushu, Fukuoka Prefecture. She participated in track and field as a youngster, she began playing rugby for Fukuoka Ladies RFC while in junior high school. After graduating from Tochiku High School in Fukuoka in 2020, she attended Rissho University.

== Rugby career ==
Yoshimura made her international debut for Japan against Ireland on 21 November 2021 in Dublin. In 2022, she was selected in Japan's squad to the delayed 2021 Rugby World Cup in New Zealand.

She featured for Japan at the 2023 Asia Rugby Women's Championship which was hosted by Kazakhstan. She scored a try in the match as the Sakura's defeated hosts, Kazakhstan, 72–0 to win the tournament.

On 28 July 2025, she was named in Japan's squad to the Women's Rugby World Cup in England.
