= Wako Kitano =

Japan international rugby union player

- Born: 8 September 1999 (age 27)
- Height: 167 cm (5 ft 6 in)
- Weight: 92 kg (203 lb; 14 st 7 lb)

Rugby union career
- Position: Prop
Senior career
Years	Team	Apps	(Points)
2022–	Mie Pearls		
International career
Years	Team	Apps	(Points)
2019–	Japan	25	(20)

Wako Kitano (born 8 September 1999) is a Japanese rugby union player. She competed for Japan at the 2021 and 2025 Women's Rugby World Cups.

== Early career ==
Kitano started playing rugby in Junior high school. She attended Kobe Kohoku High School after discovering that they had a girl's rugby club. She graduated High school in 2018 and entered Ryukoku University. She also graduated from Ryutsu Keizai University in 2022.

== Rugby career ==
On 13 July 2019, she made her international debut for Japan, she started in the match against Australia during their Australian tour.

In 2022, she joined the Mie Pearls. In September that year, she was selected in the Japanese squad to the delayed 2021 Rugby World Cup in New Zealand.

She scored one of eleven tries in Japan's 72–0 trouncing of Kazakhstan in the 2023 Asia Rugby Championship. In 2024, she scored the first try for the Sakura's in their 17–17 draw against the United States in Kitakyushu.

On 28 July 2025, she was named in the Japanese side to the Women's Rugby World Cup in England. She scored a try in their final game of the tournament against Spain.
