= Sakurako Hatada =

Japan international rugby union player

- Born: 8 May 2003 (age 23)
- Height: 161 cm (5 ft 3 in)
- Weight: 65 kg (143 lb; 10 st 3 lb)

Rugby union career
- Position: Centre
International career
| Years | Team | Apps | (Points) |
| 2023– | Japan | 11 | (20) |

Sakurako Hatada (born 8 May 2003) is a Japanese rugby union player. She competed for Japan at the 2025 Women's Rugby World Cup.

== Early life and career ==
Hatada started playing rugby at Dazaifu Rugby School in Fukuoka as a seven year old. She continued playing at Chikushi High School where she graduated in 2022, she then enrolled at Nippon Sport Science University.

== Rugby career ==
On 10 September 2023, she made her test debut for Japan against Fiji.

In May 2024, she scored a try against Hong Kong in the opening match of the Asia Women's Championship. A month later, she scored twice for Japan against Fiji in the first of a two-test series.

Hatada was named in the Japanese side to the 2025 Women's Rugby World Cup on 28 July. She scored the Sakura's opening try against the Black Ferns in their 62–19 loss in the pool stages.
