= Kurume University =

Private university in Fukuoka, Japan

Coordinates: 33°19′43.3″N 130°30′40″E

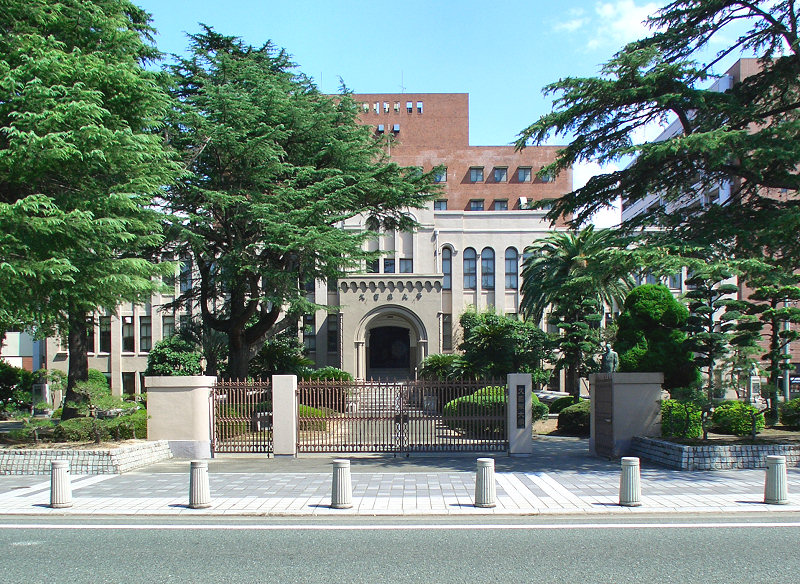
- Kurume University headquarters
- Other names: Kyūdai
- Established: 1928
- Founders: Kiroku Mizoguchi
- Endowment: 706M US$
- President: Naohisa Uchimura
- Location: Kurume, Fukuoka, Japan
- Website: www.kurume-u.ac.jp

Kurume University (久留米大学, Kurume Daigaku), abbreviated to Kyudai (久大, Kyūdai), is a private university located in Fukuoka, Japan, on the island of Kyushu.

Founded in 1928 as the Medical Specialized School in Japan, it has been recognised as a leading institution of higher education and research in Kyushu, Japan, and beyond.

== History ==
- 1928 Kyūshū Medical School established. (A precursor of Kurume University)
- 1949 Faculty of Commerce was established on the Mii Campus.

== Undergraduate Faculties and Departments ==
- Faculty of Literature
  - Intercultural Studies
  - Psychology
  - Information Sociology
  - Social Welfare
- Faculty of Economics
  - Cultural Economics
  - Economics
- Faculty of Commerce
  - Commerce
- Faculty of Law
  - Jurisprudence
  - International Politics
- School of medicine
  - School of Medicine
  - School of Nursing

== Institutes ==
Institute of Foreign Language Education

== Graduate Schools ==
- Graduate School of Comparative Studies of International Cultures and Societies
- Graduate School of Psychology
- Graduate School of Commerce
- Graduate School of Medicine
- Graduate and Professional School of Law

== Campuses ==
- Mii Campus
  - The Faculties of Literature, Economics, Commerce, Law and Graduate and Professional School of Law
- Asahi-machi Campus
  - school of medicine, Kurume University Hospital
- Kurume University Beijing Educational Exchange Center (China)

== University Hospital ==
- Kurume University Hospital
- Kurume University Medical Center
- Kurume University Rehabilitation Center

== Main attached research institutes (14 research institutes) ==
- Institute of Comparative Studies of International Cultures and Societies (Mii Campus)
- Institute of Foreign Language Education (Mii Campus)
- Institute of Industrial Economies (Mii Campus)
- Research Center for Innovative Cancer Therapy (Asahi-machi Campus)
- The international center (Mii Campus) etc.

== Libraries ==
- 2 Libraries (Mii Campus, Asahi-machi Campus)
