= CUS Milano =

CUS Milano (Italian: Centro Universitario Sportivo di Milano, "University Sports Centre of Milan") is a university sports centre founded in 1947, promoting the practice and the expansion of sport and physical education for students of all universities of Milan. CUS has 11 division teams, athletics, rugby, tennis, sailing, swimming and water polo, ice hockey, rowing, canoeing, volleyball, softball and basketball, and a number of fitness courses that are open to any student at any level.

== Universities ==
- Università Cattolica del Sacro Cuore
- Bocconi University
- University of Milan
- University of Milan Bicocca
- IULM
- Politecnico di Milano

== Cup of universities in Milan ==
The universities who have won the cup in several years:

- 2011/2012 Politecnico di Milano
- 2010/2011 Università Cattolica del Sacro Cuore
- 2009/2010 Università Cattolica del Sacro Cuore
- 2008/2009 Università Cattolica del Sacro Cuore
- 2007/2008 Politecnico di Milano
- 2006/2007 Università Cattolica del Sacro Cuore
- 2005/2006 University of Milan

== See also ==
- Centro Universitario Sportivo Italiano
