= Kotomi Taniguchi =

Japan international rugby union player

- Born: 10 April 1995 (age 31)
- Height: 1.63 m (5 ft 4 in)
- Weight: 73 kg (161 lb)

Rugby union career
- Position: Hooker
Senior career
Years	Team	Apps	(Points)
2018–2023	Mie Pearls		(0)
2023–	Yokogawa Musashino Artemi-Stars		(0)
International career
Years	Team	Apps	(Points)
2019–	Japan	29	(30)

Kotomi Taniguchi (谷口琴美 born 10 April 1995) is a Japanese rugby union player, who plays Hooker for the Japan women's national rugby union team. She competed for Japan at the 2021 and 2025 Women's Rugby World Cups.

== Career ==
Taniguchi graduated from Nippon Sport Science University in 2018 and joined the Mie Pearls.

On 16 November 2019, she made her international debut for Japan against Italy during their European tour.

In 2022, she was selected for the Japan women's national team for the delayed 2021 Rugby World Cup that was held in New Zealand.

In 2023, she joined the Yokogawa Musashino Artemi-Stars.

On 28 July 2025, she was named in Japan's squad to the Women's Rugby World Cup which will be held in England.

== Personal life ==
Her father is former rugby union player and referee, Koji Taniguchi.
