= 2023 Asia Rugby Women's Championship =

12th edition of the Asia Rugby Women's Championship

Tournament details
- Host: Kazakhstan
- Venue: Almaty Sports Training Complex
- Date: May 23, 2023 – May 28, 2023
- Countries: Hong Kong China; Japan; Kazakhstan
- Teams: 3

Final positions
- Champions: Japan (5th title)
- Runner-up: Kazakhstan

Tournament statistics
- Matches played: 2
- Tries scored: 19 (9.5 per match)
- Top scorer(s): (Japan) Ayasa Otsuka – 17 points
- Website: Asia Rugby

The 2023 Asia Rugby Women's Championship is the 12th edition of the Asia Rugby Women's Championship, and took place from 23 to 28 May and was hosted in Almaty, Kazakhstan. The winner and runner-up will classify for the inaugural edition of the WXV. The winner qualifies for WXV2, and the runner-up competes in WXV3. WXV will also provide a pathway to the 2025 Rugby World Cup, with at least the top five non-qualified teams at the end of WXV 2024 earning qualification to the tournament.

Japan defeated Kazakhstan in the final and were crowned champions. Both teams will compete in the inaugural WXV competition in October, with Japan set to compete in WXV 2 and Kazakhstan in WXV 3.

== Format ==
The first match will see 15th ranked, Hong Kong China, take on hosts Kazakhstan who are ranked 19th at the Almaty Sports Training Complex in Almaty at 16:00 (+6 GMT). The winner will face Japan in the final on May 28 at the same venue at 15:00 local time.

China was initially scheduled to play Japan in the semifinals but withdrew from the tournament. Thus, giving Japan a win by default.

== Match officials ==
On 18 May 2023, Asia Rugby announced the appointment of match officials for the upcoming tournament.

Referees (2)

- (Japan) Eri Kamimura
- (Singapore) Christabelle Lim

Assistants (3)

- (Japan) Hibiki Ikeda
- (Singapore) Leow Wei Liang
- (Uzbekistan) Yuliya Ignatenko

Television Match Official

- (Mongolia) Greg Hinton

== Fixtures ==
| 23 May 2023 | Kazakhstan | 27–23 | Hong Kong China | Almaty Sports Training Complex, Almaty |
| 16:00 ALMT (UTC+6) | Try: Amina Tulegenova (2) 7' m, 33' m Yelena Yurova (2) 37' c, 55' m Veronika Stepanyuga 49' m Con: Gulim Bakhytbek 38'; Cards: Liliya Kibisheva (yellow card) 40' to 50' | | Try: Qian Jiayu 30' m Chong Ka-yan 41' m Natasha Olson-Thorne 60' c Con: Aileen Ryan 61'; Pen: Aileen Ryan (2) 17', 36' | Referee: Eri Kamimura (JRFU) |

=== Final ===
| 28 May 2023 | Japan | 72–0 | Kazakhstan | Almaty Sports Training Complex, Almaty |
| 15:00 ALMT (UTC+6) | Try: Ayano Nagai (2) 3' c, 13' c Komachi Imakugi 20' m Kotono Yasuo (2) 25' m, 43' c Wako Kitano 28' c Sora Nishimura 35' m Yuki Paraki 40+1' c Otoka Yoshimura 54' c Masami Kawamura 62' m Ayumu Kokaji 72' c Con: Ayasa Otsuka (7) 4', 13', 30', 40+2', 44', 55', 73'; Pen: Ayasa Otsuka 9' | | Cards: Daiana Kazibekova (yellow card) 29' to 39' | Referee: Christabelle Lim (Singapore) |

== Bracket ==
| Semi-final | | | Final |
| | | | 1 | Japan | 72 |
| 1 | Kazakhstan | 27 | 2 | Kazakhstan | 0 |
| 2 | Hong Kong China | 23 |
