= Asuka Kuge =

Japan international rugby union player

- Born: 22 September 1994 (age 32) Yokohama, Kanagawa
- Height: 164 cm (5 ft 5 in)
- Weight: 78 kg (172 lb; 12 st 4 lb)

Rugby union career
- Position: Hooker
Senior career
Years	Team	Apps	(Points)
- Arukas Queen Kumagaya
International career
Years	Team	Apps	(Points)
2022–Present	Japan	25	(15)

Asuka Kuge (born 22 September 1994) is a Japanese rugby union player. She competed for Japan at the 2025 Women's Rugby World Cup.

== Early career ==
Kuge played basketball in Junior high school. She started playing rugby in her first year at Shinsakae High School. She graduated from Rissho University.

== Rugby career ==
In 2020, she was named captain of Arukas Queen Kumagaya.

On 10 May 2022, she started in her international debut for Japan against Australia during their Australian tour.

On 28 July 2025, she was named in the Japanese side to the Women's Rugby World Cup in England.
