= Ayasa Ōtsuka =

Japan international rugby union player

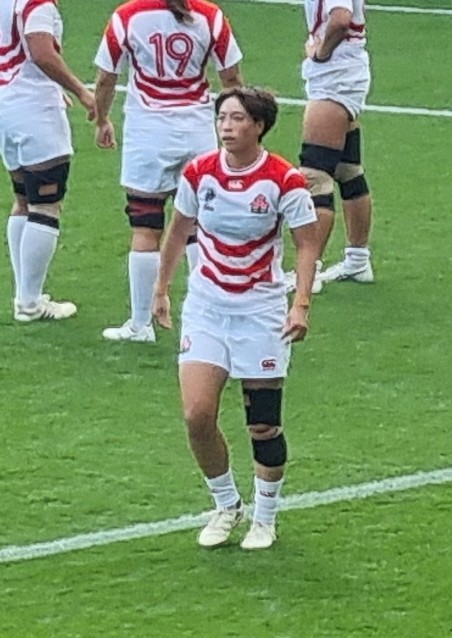
- Born: 5 May 1999 (age 27)
- Height: 163 cm (5 ft 4 in)
- Weight: 65 kg (143 lb; 10 st 3 lb)

Rugby union career
- Position: Fly-half
Senior career
Years	Team	Apps	(Points)
2024–	Arukas Queen Kumagaya		(0)
International career
Years	Team	Apps	(Points)
2019–	Japan	38	(168)

Ayasa Otsuka (born 5 May 1999) is a Japanese rugby union player. She competed for Japan at the 2021 and 2025 Women's Rugby World Cups.

== Early life ==
Otsuka comes from a rugby family and has been playing rugby since she was three. She graduated from Iwami Chisuikan High School in 2018, she then entered Ryukoku University.

== Rugby career ==
On November 16, 2019, she made her international debut for Japan against Italy during their European tour.

In May 2022, Japan toured Australia and played matches against Fiji and the Wallaroos. She scored the first try in their 12–10 win against Australia and was named player of the match. South Africa then toured Japan for a two-test series in July that year. In the second test she scored one of only two tries in their loss to the Springbok women.

Ireland also toured Japan in August for two tests. The Irish heavily defeated Japan 57–22 in the first game, she only managed to score seven points. In the last match, Otsuka crossed the tryline in the 16th minute to help her team win 29–10. She was subsequently selected for the Japan women's national team for the delayed 2021 Rugby World Cup in New Zealand. She made an appearance against Italy in her sides final game of the tournament.

She played in the inaugural 2023 WXV 2 tournament in South Africa. She faced Scotland in the last match which Japan lost 38–7.

In March 2024, she joined Arukas Queen Kumagaya. She appeared for Japan during the 2024 Asia Rugby Women's Championship against Hong Kong. She was a standout for the side in their 64–0 victory against Kazakhstan as she helped them qualify for the 2025 Women's Rugby World Cup. She scored 19 points in the match, via a try and seven conversions. She was the lead points scorer in the competition.

She was named in the Sakura's squad when they toured Fiji in June 2024 for a two-test series. When the United States toured Japan in August 2024, she played in both tests, her side drew with the Eagles in the first match and narrowly lost the second game. Otsuka competed at the 2024 WXV 2 tournament in South Africa. In the opening match against South Africa she scored a try and converted a goal in her teams 31–24 defeat. In round two, she kicked a penalty in her sides loss to Scotland.

In May 2025, she featured for Japan at the Asia Rugby Women's Championship in Fukuoka. She helped the Sakura's record their biggest win in their history with a 90–0 thrashing of Kazakhstan.

In July 2025, she was part of the Japanese side that faced Spain in a two-test series ahead of the World Cup. Later on 28 July, she was named in the Japanese squad to the Women's Rugby World Cup in England.
