= Sachiko Kato =

Japan international rugby union player

- Born: 19 February 2000 (age 26)
- Height: 1.64 m (5 ft 5 in)
- Weight: 84 kg (185 lb)

Rugby union career
- Position: Prop
Senior career
Years	Team	Apps	(Points)
2021–	Exeter Chiefs	22	(15)
International career
Years	Team	Apps	(Points)
2017–	Japan	33	(25)

Sachiko Kato (加藤幸子; born 19 February 2000) is a Japanese rugby union player. She plays Prop for Japan internationally and for Exeter Chiefs in the Premier 15s. She competed at the 2021 Rugby World Cup in New Zealand.

== Rugby career ==
Kato made her international debut for Japan against Hong Kong when she was 17 years old. In 2021, She was named in Japan's squad for their European tour. She featured in all three test matches against Wales, Scotland and Ireland. She scored a try in their 36–12 loss to Scotland.

Kato was named in the Sakura fifteens squad for their Australian tour in 2022. She was later selected in Japan's squad for the 2021 Rugby World Cup in New Zealand.

In 2024, she made the side for the 2024 Asia Rugby Championship. Kato scored the Sakura's first try in their drubbing of Kazakhstan. The win helped them secure a place at the 2025 Rugby World Cup and the 2024 WXV 2.

She was named in the Sakura fifteens squad for their tour to the United States in 2025. She eventually started in her sides 39–33 victory over the Eagles in Los Angeles on 26 April. On 28 July 2025, she was named in the Japanese side to the Women's Rugby World Cup in England.
