= Lesley McKenzie =

Canadian rugby union player

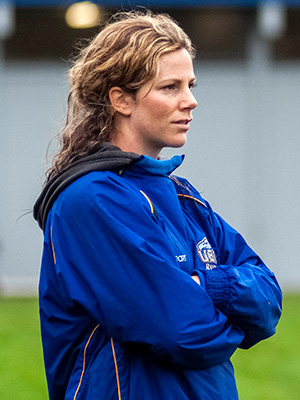
- McKenzie in 2012 coached the UBC Thunderbirds
- Born: December 23, 1980 (age 45) Fort Nelson, British Columbia
- Height: 170 cm (5 ft 7 in)
- Weight: 75 kg (165 lb)
- University: University of British Columbia

Rugby union career
- Position: Hooker
Amateur team(s)
Years	Team	Apps	(Points)
	Meraloma Rugby		(0)
	UBCOB Ravens		(0)
Provincial / State sides
Years	Team	Apps	(Points)
	British Columbia		(0)
International career
Years	Team	Apps	(Points)
2004–2010?	Canada	25	
Coaching career
- Years: Team
- 2008–2013: UBC Thunderbirds
- 2018–2019: Japan 7s (assistant coach)
- 2019–present: Japan

Lesley McKenzie (born December 23, 1980) is a Canadian rugby union player with 25 caps and the coach of the Japan women's national rugby union team. She played for Canada at the 2006 and 2010 Rugby World Cups, and coached Japan at the 2021 World Cup.

== Rugby career ==
During university, McKenzie played for five years with the UBC Thunderbirds. She played club rugby for Meraloma and UBCOB Ravens.

McKenzie earned her first senior cap with the Canada women's national rugby team at the 2004 Churchill Cup versus the United States women's national rugby team. Previously, she played for the under 23 representative team and represented British Columbia as a senior.

In 2008, McKenzie played rugby in New Zealand as preparation for the 2010 World Cup.

== Coaching career ==
McKenzie joined the UBC Thunderbirds as head coach in 2008 and left her post in 2013. Kim Donaldson was her assistant coach from 2009 to 2011 Maria Gallo was her assistant coach from 2011 to 2013.

In 2012, McKenzie led the Canada women's FISU 7s team to France. In 2014, McKenzie was the Wellington Rugby Football Union's girls development co-coordinator.

From 2015 to 2018, McKenzie developed and delivered programs as a game development officer for the Wanganui Rugby Football Union. In 2018, She immigrated to Japan to become an assistant coach for the Japan women's national rugby sevens team. Prior to this, she was hired five times for two weeks as a part-time resource coach for the Japanese sevens team. As assistant coach, McKenzie was also involved in academy branches across Japan.

In January 2019, McKenzie was appointed head coach of the fifteen-a-side team. This role also includes the responsibility of proactively encouraging and promoting women players to become coaches.

McKenzie had her contract renewed as Japan's head coach after the 2021 Rugby World Cup, the Japan Rugby Football Union announced that it had extended her contract up to 31 March 2024.
