= Japan women's national rugby union team =

National sporting side of Japan

Japan
- Nicknames: Cherry Blossom 15 (桜十五 (kanji), さくらフィフティーン (kana), Sakura fifutīn)
- Union: Japan Rugby Football Union
- Head coach: Lesley McKenzie
- Captain: Saki Minami
First colours	Second colours

World Rugby ranking
- Current: 11 (as of 4 September 2023)
- Highest: 10 (2023)

First international
- France 62–0 Japan (Aberavon, Wales; 6 April 1991)

Biggest win
- Japan 90–0 Kazakhstan (Fukuoka, Japan; 15 May 2025)

Biggest defeat
- Japan 0–121 United States (Melrose, Scotland; 15 April 1994)

World Cup
- Appearances: 6 (first in 1991)
- Best result: 8th (1994)

The Japan women's national rugby union team (Ragubī joshi nihon daihyō (ラグビー女子日本代表), nicknamed Sakura Fifteen) are a national sporting side of Japan, representing them at rugby union. The side played their first test match at the inaugural 1991 Women's Rugby World Cup in Wales. They have competed in five Rugby World Cups since then and have won seven Asia Rugby Women's Championship titles.

== History ==
Japan made their international debut at the 1991 Women's Rugby World Cup. Since then, Japan has appeared at three other editions of the World Cup in 1994, 2002 and 2017. The team has won the Asia Rugby Women's Championship in 2015, 2016 and 2017.

Japan qualified for the 2021 Rugby World Cup in New Zealand after a revision of Asia's qualification was made due to the global pandemic. As Asia's highest ranked team they qualified automatically for the tournament.

In November 2021, Japan toured Europe and played test matches against Ireland, Scotland and Wales. Wales defeated Japan 23–5, the Sakura's scoring their only try in the 77th minute with a missed conversion. Scotland ran in six tries to give the Sakura's their second loss 36–12, at the DAM Health Stadium in Edinburgh. Ireland down to 14 players pulled off an unlikely win to beat Japan 15–12.

Japan toured Australia in 2022, they played and won matches against Australia, the Australian Barbarians, and Fiji.

In May 2025, the Sakura's had their biggest win when they trounced Kazakhstan 90–0 in the opening match of the Asia Rugby Women's Championship in Fukuoka; they ran in 14 unanswered tries. They eventually won the tournament, making it their seventh Championship title.

== Records ==
=== Overall ===
Women's World Rugby Rankings Top 20 rankings as of 15 September 2025
Rank	Change*	Team	Points
1	Steady	England	97.76
2	Steady	Canada	90.13
3	Steady	New Zealand	88.76
4	Steady	France	86.42
5	Steady	Ireland	78.20
6	Steady	Scotland	77.39
7	Steady	Australia	75.46
8	Steady	United States	72.90
9	Steady	Italy	72.37
10	Steady	South Africa	71.62
11	Steady	Japan	69.72
12	Steady	Wales	66.13
13	Steady	Fiji	63.98
14	Steady	Spain	62.42
15	Steady	Samoa	59.72
16	Steady	Hong Kong	57.56
17	Steady	Netherlands	57.42
18	Steady	Russia	55.10
19	Steady	Kazakhstan	53.88
20	Steady	Kenya	50.68
*Change from the previous week

(Full internationals only) Correct as 31 August 2025.

See Women's international rugby for information about the status of international games and match numbering

Rugby: Japan internationals 1991-
Opponent	First game	Played	Won	Drawn	Lost	Win %
Australia	2017	4	1	0	3	25%
Canada	1994	2	0	0	2	0.00%
Fiji	2016	6	5	0	1	83.33%
France	1991	3	0	0	3	0.00%
Hong Kong	1998	19	18	0	1	94.44%
Ireland	1994	8	2	0	6	25%
Italy	2002	8	1	1	6	12.5%
Kazakhstan	2005	11	4	0	7	36.36%
Netherlands	2002	2	1	0	1	50%
New Zealand	2022	2	0	0	2	0.00%
Samoa	2000	2	2	0	0	100%
Scotland	2019	4	1	0	3	25%
Singapore	2007	4	4	0	0	100%
South Africa	2022	3	2	0	1	66.67%
Spain	1991	6	4	0	2	66.67%
Sweden	1991	2	1	0	1	50%
United States	1994	5	1	1	3	20%
Wales	2017	3	1	0	2	33.33%
Summary	1991	94	48	2	44	51.06%

=== Rugby World Cup ===
Rugby World Cup
Year	Round	Position	GP	W	D	L	PF	PA
(Wales) 1991	Plate quarter-finals	12th	3	0	0	3	0	112
(Scotland) 1994	Shield 3rd play-off	8th	5	1	0	4	13	293
(Netherlands) 1998	Did not enter							
(Spain) 2002	13th place play-off	14th	4	2	0	2	58	95
(Canada) 2006	Did not qualify							
(England) 2010	Did not qualify							
(France) 2014	Did not qualify							
(Ireland) 2017	11th place play-off	11th	5	1	0	4	87	152
(New Zealand) 2021	Pool stage	—	3	0	0	3	30	92
(England) 2025	Pool stage	—	3	1	0	2	62	125
(Australia) 2029	TBD							
(United States) 2033	TBD							
Total	6/10	8th^{†}	23	5	0	18	250	869
Champion Runner-up Third place Fourth place: * Tied placing ^{†} Best placing / Home venue

== Players ==
=== Recent squad ===
On 28 July, Japan announced their final squad for the 2025 Women's Rugby World Cup.

Note: The age and number of caps listed for each player is as of 22 August 2025, the first day of the tournament.

Player	Position	Date of birth (age)	Caps	Club/province
Ayumu Kokaji	Hooker	19 February 2000 (aged 25)	11	(Japan) Tokyo Sankyu Phoenix
Asuka Kuge	Hooker	22 September 1994 (aged 30)	22	(Japan) Arukas Queen Kumagaya
Kotomi Taniguchi	Hooker	10 April 1995 (aged 30)	26	(Japan) Yokogawa Musashino Artemi-Stars
Sachiko Kato	Prop	19 February 2000 (aged 25)	30	(Japan) Yokogawa Musashino Artemi-Stars
Wako Kitano	Prop	8 September 1999 (aged 25)	22	(Japan) Mie Pearls
Hinata Komaki	Prop	9 May 2001 (aged 24)	21	(Japan) Tokyo Sankyu Phoenix
Miharu Machida	Prop	26 May 2004 (aged 21)	4	Japan University of Economics
Manami Mine	Prop	11 September 2003 (aged 21)	12	(Japan) Nippon Sport Science University
Nijiho Nagata	Prop	6 December 2000 (aged 24)	29	(Japan) Mie Pearls
Ayano Sakurai	Second row	15 April 1996 (aged 29)	23	(Japan) Yokogawa Musashino Artemi-Stars
Yuna Sato	Second row	11 September 1998 (aged 26)	24	(Japan) Tokyo Sankyu Phoenix
Otoka Yoshimura	Second row	15 May 2001 (aged 24)	29	(Japan) Arukas Queen Kumagaya
Kyoko Hosokawa	Back row	8 July 1999 (aged 26)	17	(Japan) Mie Pearls
Masami Kawamura	Back row	13 July 1999 (aged 26)	22	(Japan) Yokogawa Musashino Artemi-Stars
Sakurako Korai	Back row	9 April 2003 (aged 22)	22	(Japan) Nippon Sport Science University
Iroha Nagata	Back row	21 December 1998 (aged 26)	40	(Japan) Arukas Queen Kumagaya
Jennifer Nduka	Back row	18 October 2000 (aged 24)	15	(Japan) Hokkaido Barbarians Diana
Seina Saito	Back row	30 May 1992 (aged 33)	50	(Japan) Mie Pearls
Megumi Abe	Scrum-half	28 April 1998 (aged 27)	32	(Japan) Arukas Queen Kumagaya
Moe Tsukui	Scrum-half	28 March 2000 (aged 25)	42	(Japan) Yokogawa Musashino Artemi-Stars
Ayasa Otsuka	Fly-half	5 May 1999 (aged 26)	36	(Japan) Arukas Queen Kumagaya
Minori Yamamoto	Fly-half	9 December 1996 (aged 28)	38	(Japan) Yokohama TKM
Nao Ando	Centre	17 July 2001 (aged 24)	12	(Japan) Brave Louve
Mana Furuta	Centre	16 November 1997 (aged 27)	36	(Japan) Tokyo Sankyu Phoenix
Sakurako Hatada	Centre	8 May 2003 (aged 22)	9	(Japan) Nippon Sport Science University
Haruka Hirotsu	Centre	29 October 2000 (aged 24)	17	(Japan) Nanairo Prism Fukuoka
Kanako Kobayashi	Centre	13 November 1998 (aged 26)	20	(Japan) Yokogawa Musashino Artemi-Stars
Komachi Imakugi	Wing	6 January 2002 (aged 23)	30	(Japan) Arukas Queen Kumagaya
Mele Yua Havili Kagawa	Wing	29 September 2001 (aged 23)	5	(Japan) Nanairo Prism Fukuoka
Misaki Matsumura	Wing	6 March 2005 (aged 20)	13	(Japan) Tokyo Sankyu Phoenix
Rinka Matsuda	Fullback	5 December 2001 (aged 23)	14	(Japan) Tokyo Sankyu Phoenix
Sora Nishimura	Fullback	29 September 2000 (aged 24)	21	(Japan) Mie Pearls

== See also ==
- Sport in Japan
- Japan national rugby union team
