= Sakurako Korai =

Japan international rugby union player

- Born: 9 April 2003 (age 23)
- Height: 168 cm (5 ft 6 in)
- Weight: 73 kg (161 lb; 11 st 7 lb)

Rugby union career
- Position: Loose Forward
International career
Years	Team	Apps	(Points)
2022–	Japan	23	(25)

Sakurako Korai (born 9 April 2003) is a Japanese rugby union player. She competed for Japan at the 2021 and 2025 Women's Rugby World Cups.

== Early life ==
Korai followed her older sister at the age of three and began playing rugby at the Niigata Nakajo Rugby School. She graduated from Nakajo Junior High School in Tainai. After graduating from Kanto Gakuin Mutsuura High School in 2022, she entered Nippon Sport Science University.

== Rugby career ==
On 24 July 2022, she made her international debut for Japan, she came off the bench against South Africa. In November that year, she was subsequently selected for the Japananese squad to the delayed 2021 Rugby World Cup in New Zealand.

In May 2025, she was handed her first captaincy role as she led her side in the opening match of the Asia Rugby Championship against Kazakhstan, she also scored a hat-trick. She also led her team in their two-test series against Spain ahead of the World Cup. On 28 July, she was named in the Japanese side to the Women's Rugby World Cup in England.
