= Hokkaido Barbarians Diana =

Japanese women's rugby union club, based in Sapporo

- Union: Japan Rugby Football Union
- Founded: 2010; 16 years ago
- Ground: Barbarians Jozankei Ground
- League: All-Japan Women's Rugby Championship

Official website
- www.hokkaido-barbarians.com

Hokkaido Barbarians Diana are a Japanese women's rugby union team based in Sapporo, Hokkaido. They mainly compete in the national sevens competition, the Taiyo Life Women's Sevens Series.

== History ==
The team is managed by the certified non-profit organization Hokkaido Barbarians Rugby and Sports Club (Hokkaido Barbarians RFC). The club has numerous teams within its organization, including rugby teams for both men and women, junior and senior. In addition to rugby, the club is also represented in other sports, such as ice hockey and badminton.

In 2010, the club founded a women's team, which was renamed "Diana" the following year.

On 12 May 2024, they won the Taiyo Life Women's Sevens Series Promotion Tournament, and became one of the twelve core teams for the 2025 tournament.

== Honours ==
- Taiyo Life Women's Sevens Series:
  - Champion: 2024.
