= Nanairo Prism Fukuoka =

Japanese women's rugby union club, based in Kurume

- Union: Japan Rugby Football Union
- Founded: 2019; 7 years ago
- Location: Kurume, Fukuoka Prefecture
- Ground: Kurume University Mii Campus Grounds
- CEO: Hidetaka Murakami
- Coach: Takanari Kukimoto
- League: All-Japan Women's Rugby Championship

Official website
- nanairo-lab.jp/prism-fukuoka/

Nanairo Prism Fukuoka are a Japanese women's rugby union team based in Kurume, Fukuoka Prefecture. They mostly compete in the Taiyo Life Women's Sevens Series, but have occasionally formed joint teams with other clubs to compete in fifteens competitions. The team was founded in 2019 and is operated by the general incorporated association Nanairo Lab.

== History ==
Hidetaka Murakami previously belonged to the Kurume University School of Medicine rugby club. After becoming a physician, he accompanied the Japan under-21 team as its doctor at the 2002 Under-21 World Championship in South Africa. He later served as a team doctor for Japan at the 2011 Rugby World Cup and, from 2016, for the Sunwolves.

CEO Hidetaka Murakami founded the general incorporated association Nanairo Lab, and signed a comprehensive partnership agreement with Kurume University on 24 November 2019, that included the use of its facilities, human resource development, and regional development.

On 10 December 2019, the women's seven-a-side rugby team Nanairo Prism Fukuoka was formed. Chiharu Nakamura, captain of the Japanese women's national sevens team for 10 years, served as general manager and was also a contracted player. Then-head coach Yusaku Kuwazuru had captained the Japanese men's sevens team that finished fourth at the 2016 Summer Olympics.

In February 2022, the Kyushu Women's Sevens was held; it was organized by the Kyushu Rugby Football Union and co-organized by Nanairo Lab. Nanairo Prism Fukuoka finished as runners-up in the competition. They were also part of the Kyushu–Nagato joint team that participated in the 25th Kansai Women's Rugby Football Tournament.

On 3 February 2023, Nanairo Lab signed a partnership agreement with Kurume City to promote sports and to revitalize the local area.

The team finished fourth overall in the Taiyo Life Women's Sevens Series in 2023, and was selected to participate as a core team for the 2024 series.

In 2025, they formed a joint team with sister team, the Kurume University women's rugby club, to compete in the 28th Kansai Women's Rugby Football Tournament.

== Results ==
=== Nanairo Cup Kitakyushu ===
- 2022: Runners-up out of six teams
- 2023: Third out of ten teams
- 2024: Third out of ten teams
- 2025: Champions out of ten teams

=== Regional Women's Sevens ===
- 2022: Champions out of nine teams, earning qualification for the 2023 Taiyo Life Women's Sevens Series

=== Taiyo Life Women's Sevens Series ===
- 2022: Entered the third round in Suzuka as a guest team and finished ninth out of sixteen teams
- 2023: Fourth overall out of sixteen teams, finishing ninth in the first round, third in the second, fourth in the third and second in the fourth
