= Brave Louve =

- Union: Japan Rugby Football Union
- Founded: 2016; 10 years ago
- Location: Fuchu, Tokyo, Japan
- League: All-Japan Women's Rugby Football Championship

Official website
- www.bravelouve.tokyo

Brave Louve is a Japanese women's rugby union team based in Fuchu, Tokyo. They compete in fifteens and sevens competitions, with Senior, Youth, and Junior representative teams. They are linked to the Toshiba Brave Lupus Tokyo.

== History ==
The club was founded in October 2016 by Yoshinori Namba and Tsutomu Matsuda, founders of the Fuchu Rugby School (now the Brave Lupus Fuchu Junior Rugby Club), and Mineo Yoshida, who was the school's coach at the time, to accommodate the growing number of girls playing. Yoshinori Namba was appointed general manager.

The name of the club is derived from the English word Brave, and the French word louve, which is the feminine form of loup (wolf).

In May 2022, the senior team made a guest appearance in the Taiyo Life Women's Sevens Series (Round 2).

In 2023, they were included in the core team of the Taiyo Life Women's Sevens Series, but were relegated the following year.

On November 8, 2023, Yoshinori Namba died at the age of 56. On December 9, before the Toshiba Brave Lupus Tokyo season opening game, the "Brave Louve Namba GM Memorial Event" was held.

In 2024, the team participated in the Taiyo Life Women's Sevens Series Promotion Tournament, they finished second and missed out on promotion.

== Staff ==
Position	Name
Representative	Mineo Yoshida
Director	Tsutomu Matsuda
Coaches	Makoto Nishino
Coaches	Atsushi Okamura
Forwards Coach	Rui Sannomiya
Youth/Junior Coaches	Hiroko Nakamura
Youth/Junior Coaches	Futaba Aoyagi
Trainers	Zyunya Yamaguchi
Trainers	Asuka Niibori
Trainers	Yukari Tateyama
Chief Manager	Ayano Hioki
