= Japan University of Economics =

Private university in Fukuoka, Japan

Coordinates: 33°30′22.1″N 130°31′36.8″E

- 日本経済大学
- Former names: Daiichi University of Economics, Fukuoka University of Economics
- Motto: 日本から、世界のこたえを。
- Type: Private
- Established: 1968
- Founders: Yorisuke Tsuzuki, Sadae Tsuzuki
- President: Asuka Tsuzuki
- Academic staff: 135
- Students: 5,359
- Doctoral students: 1
- Location: Dazaifu, Fukuoka Prefecture, Japan
- Website: www.jue.ac.jp

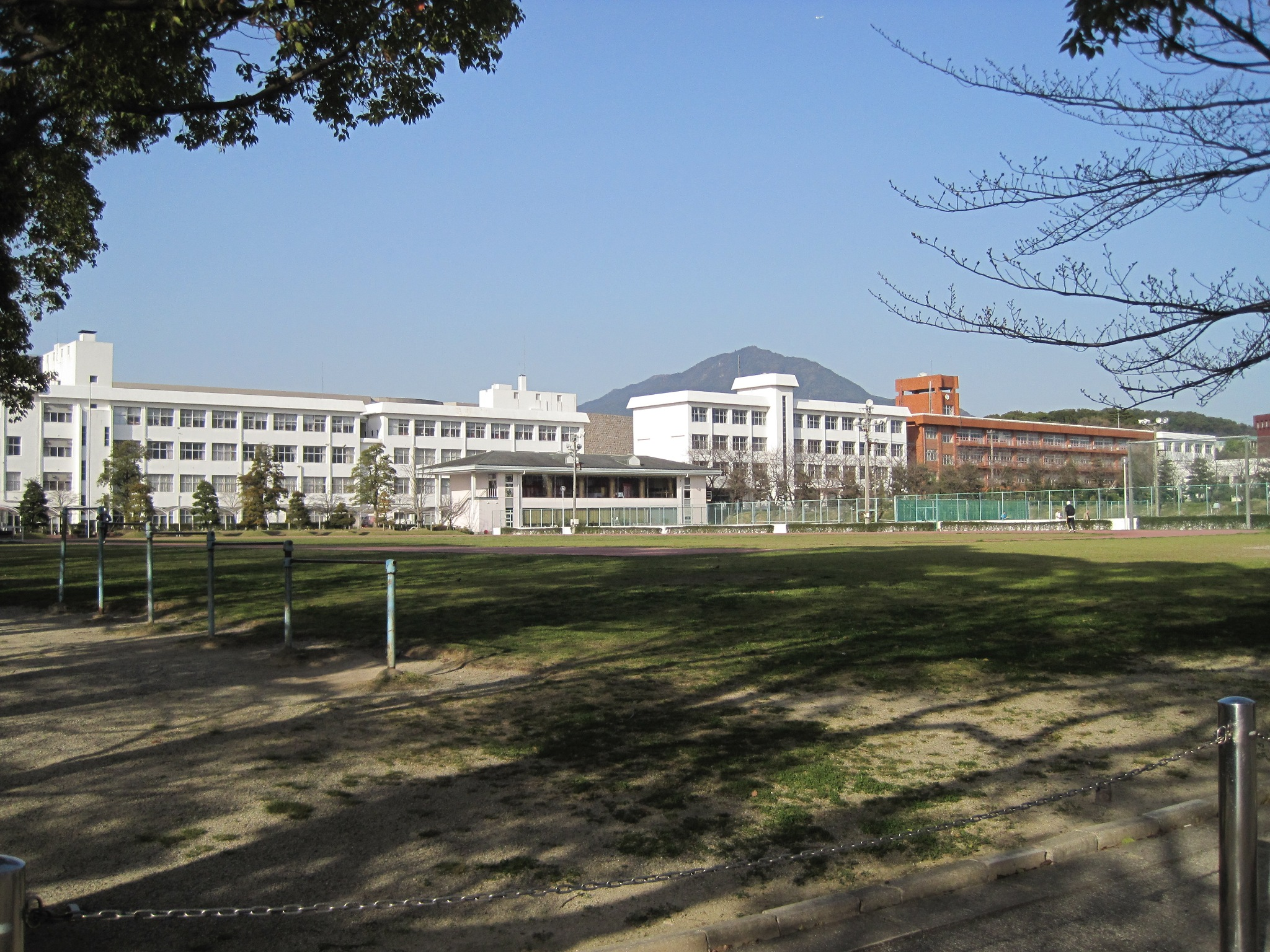
Japan University of Economics

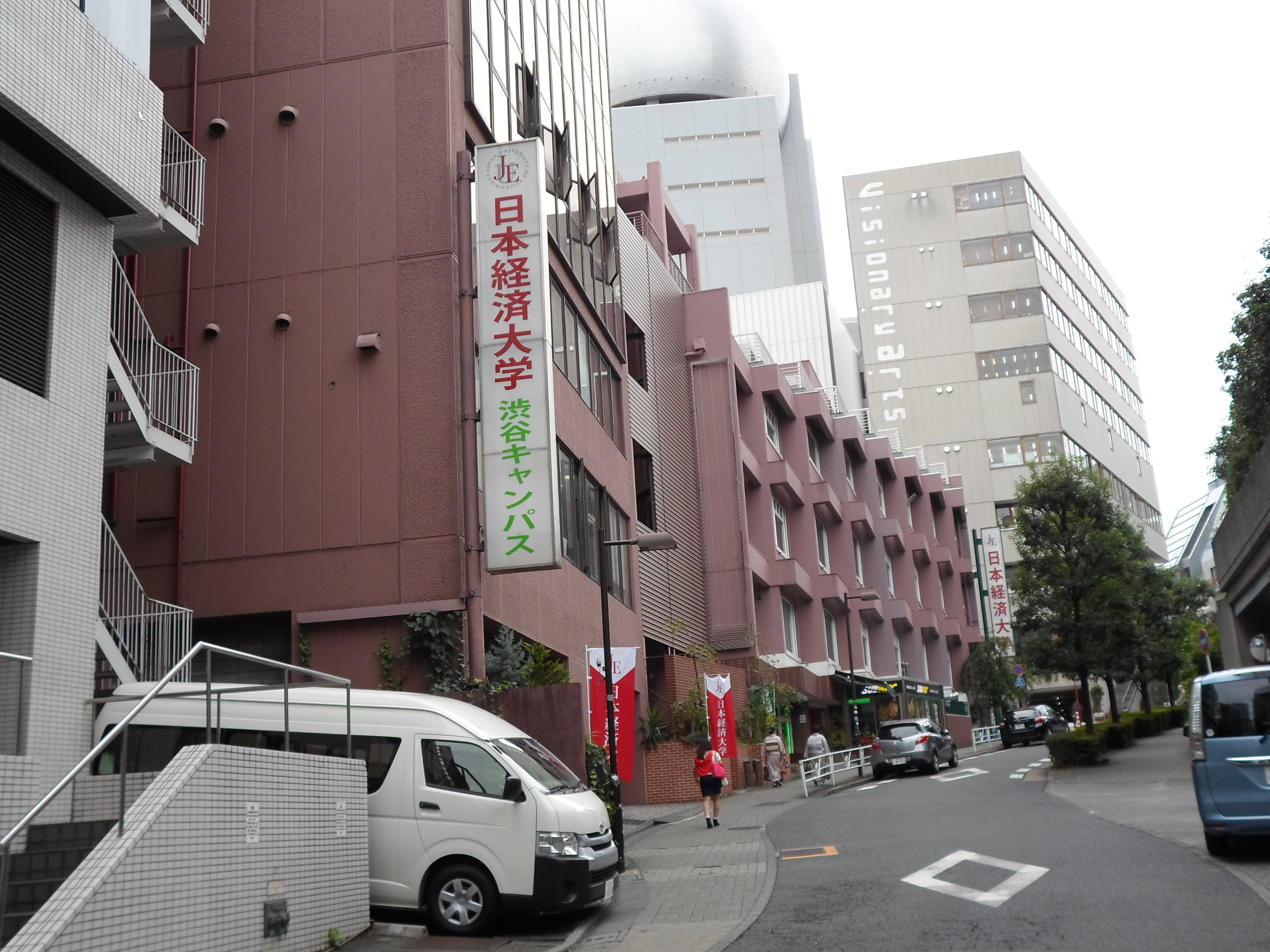
Shibuya Campus

Japan University of Economics (日本経済大学, Nihon Keizai Daigaku), abbreviated as Nikkeidai (日経大, Nikkeidai), is a private university headquartered in Dazaifu, Fukuoka, Japan.

== Overview ==
The university is owned by Tsuzuki Ikuei Educational Institute (都築育英学園, Tsuzuki Ikuei Gakuen), which is in turn a member of the Tsuzuki Education Group (都築学園グループ, Tsuzuki Gakuen Gurūpu).

The university ranks 4th in Japan by number of international students. Over 80% of students at its Tokyo campus are from overseas.

== History ==
The school was established in 1968 as Daiichi University of Economics (第一経済大学, Daiichi Keizai Daigaku). It changed its name to Fukuoka University of Economics (福岡経済大学, Fukuoka Keizai Daigaku) in 2007 and adopted its present name in 2010.

== Campuses ==
The university comprises three undergraduate campuses: its main campus in Dazaifu, Fukuoka and additional campuses in Sannomiya, Kobe and Shibuya, Tokyo. The university also has a graduate school located in Shibuya, Tokyo.

== Academics ==
=== Undergraduate ===
The university comprises two faculties, Economics and Management, offering admission to the following departments:

- Faculty of Economics
  - Department of Economics
  - Department of Commerce
  - Department of Health and Sports Management
- Faculty of Management
  - Department of Management
  - Department of Global Business
  - Department of Creative Production
  - Department of Digital Business Management

The Fukuoka campus offers admission to all departments, while the Tokyo campus offers admission to departments in the Faculty of Management only, and the Kobe campus offers admission to the Department of Commerce only.

=== Graduate ===
The university’s graduate school comprises a single faculty, the Graduate School of Business, which offers Master's and Doctoral degrees in Management.

== Notable people ==
Notable people associated with the university include:

- Chihiro Anai, singer
- ASKA, singer-songwriter
- Shingo Arizono, football player
- Chage, musician and radio personality
- Ryoji Katsuki, baseball player
- Kim Mu-young, baseball player
- Ryunosuke Noda, football player
- Naoki Nomura, football player
