= Yokogawa Musashino Artemi-Stars =

Japanese women's rugby union club, based in Tokyo

- Union: Japan Rugby Football Union
- Founded: 2017; 9 years ago
- Location: Musashino, Tokyo, Japan
- League: All-Japan Women's Rugby Championship

Official website
- artemi-stars.yokogawa-musashino.jp

Yokogawa Musashino Artemi-Stars is a Japanese women's rugby union team based in Musashino, Tokyo. They were founded in 2017.

== History ==
The Yokogawa Musashino Artemi-Stars were founded in 2017.

In 2020, due to a draw in the final of the 6th Women's Championship, the Yokogawa Musashino Artemi-Stars and the RKU Rugby Ryugasaki Grace were both crowned champions. They also established a Youth division that same year.

On January 23, 2022, the team won the 8th All Japan Women's Rugby Football Championship, defeating the joint team of Japan University of Economics, Kyushu Sangyo University, and Nagato Blue Angels 28-0 in the deciding match.

== Titles ==
- All Japan Women's Rugby Football Championship: 2020, 2022
