= Arukas Queen Kumagaya =

Japanese women's rugby union club, based in Kumagaya

- Union: Japan Rugby Football Union
- Founded: 2014; 12 years ago
- Ground: Rissho University Rugby Stadium
- Coach: Shingo Mekari
- League: All-Japan Women's Rugby Football Championship

Official website
- www.arukas-kumagaya.jp

Arukas Queen Kumagaya are a women's rugby union club based in Kumagaya, Saitama Prefecture. They compete in Japan's national fifteens and sevens tournaments.

== History ==
The Arukas Queen Kumagaya club was established in 2014 at the Kumagaya Campus of Rissho University. They are run by the non-profit organization Arukas Kumagaya.

They have won the Taiyo Life Women's Sevens Series overall championship three times, in 2014, 2015 and 2017. They were also runners-up in 2016 and 2019.

== Honours ==
- Taiyo Life Women's Sevens Series:
  - Champion: 2014, 2015, 2017.
  - Runner-up: 2016, 2019.
