= 2024 Super Rugby Aupiki season =

- Countries: New Zealand
- Tournament format(s): Round-robin and Final
- Champions: Blues Women (1st title)
- Matches played: 13
- Tries scored: 110 (8.46 per match)
- Top point scorer(s): Krysten Cottrell, Blues Women (49)
- Top try scorer(s): Katelyn Vaha'akolo, Blues Women (8)
- Official website: Official site

The 2024 Super Rugby Aupiki season was the third season of Super Rugby Aupiki (known as Sky Super Rugby Aupiki for sponsorship reasons), a professional women's rugby union club competition organised by New Zealand Rugby. The competition ran from 2 March 2024 – when Chiefs Manawa and Hurricanes Poua played the opening match in Hamilton – to 13 April 2024.

The tournament was won by Blues Women, who defeated Chiefs Manawa 24–18 in the final in Auckland, earning them their first Super Rugby Aupiki title.

== Competition format ==
In 2024, the competition was extended from three regular season matches and two play-off matches to a complete home and away round-robin format, followed by a final. This meant that each of the four teams played at least six games during the regular season – three at home and three away. The two highest ranked teams at the end of the regular season contested the final at the home ground of the highest placed team. The new competition format resulted in a total of thirteen matches played over a seven-week period.

== Standings ==
The standings at the end of the round-robin of the 2024 Super Rugby Aupiki season were:

2024 Super Rugby Aupiki standings
Pos	Team	Pld	W	D	L	PF	PA	PD	TF	TA	TB	LB	Pts	Qualification
1	Blues Women (C)	6	5	0	1	194	111	+83	31	18	2	1	23	Super Rugby Aupiki Fnal
2	Chiefs Manawa (RU)	6	4	0	2	190	130	+60	30	20	3	1	20	Super Rugby Aupiki Fnal
3	Matatū	6	2	0	4	144	162	−18	24	26	1	2	11	
4	Hurricanes Poua	6	1	0	5	123	248	−125	19	40	0	0	4	

Source: Super Rugby Aupiki - Team standings
(C) Champions; (RU) Runners-up;

== Fixtures ==
The draw for the third season of Super Rugby Aupiki was announced on 5 December 2023. The competition started on 2 March 2024, when Chiefs Manawa hosted Hurricanes Poua in Hamilton. The final between Blues Women and Chiefs Manawa took place on Saturday 13 April 2024 in Auckland. Some of the regular season matches were standalone fixtures, while others were double-headers with matches played by the teams' Super Rugby Pacific counterparts.

=== Round 1 ===
2 March 2024
14:05 (UTC+13)

Chiefs Manawa	46–24	Hurricanes Poua
Try: Azalleyah Maaka 11'; Kennedy Simon (2) 17', 28'; Ruby Tui 49'; Luka Connor (2) 66', 70'; Merania Paraone 77'; Con: Renee Holmes (4/7) 12', 29', 50', 68'; Pen: Renee Holmes (1/1) 58'	Report	Try: Elinor-Plum King 14'; Layla Sae 40'; Tamia Edwards 80+1'; Con: Isabella Waterman (2/2) 15', 41'; Kalyn Takitimu-Cook (1/1) 80+2'; Pen: Isabella Waterman (1/1) 55'

FMG Stadium Waikato, Hamilton
Referee: Ben Woolerton

2 March 2024
16:35 (UTC+13)

Matatū	17–24	Blues Women
Try: Phillipa Love 40+1'; Winnie Palamo 48'; Grace Brooker 64'; Con: Rosie Kelly (1/3) 40+2'; Cards: Martha Mataele (yellow card) 31'	Report	Try: Jaymie Kolose (2) 53', 70'; Krysten Cottrell 59'; Tafito Lafaele 78'; Con: Krysten Cottrell (2/4) 54', 60

Rugby Park, Invercargill
Referee: Natarsha Ganley

=== Round 2 ===
9 March 2024
14:05 (UTC+13)

Blues Women	10–17	Chiefs Manawa
Try: Tafito Lafaele 44'; Mel Puckett 51'	Report	Try: Ruby Tui 6'; Grace Steinmetz 13'; Grace Kukutai 57'; Con: Renee Holmes (1/3) 14'; Cards: Chyna Hohepa (yellow card) 50'

Bell Park, Pakuranga
Referee: Marcus Playle

9 March 2024
16:35 (UTC+13)

Hurricanes Poua	36–29	Matatū
Try: Monica Tagoai 8'; Shakira Baker (2) 17', 40'; Harmony Kautai 42'; Leilani Hakiwai 51'; Cilia-Marie Po'e-Tofaeono 76'; Con: Isabella Waterman (2/5) 17', 40+1'; Kalyn Takitimu-Cook (1/1) 77'	Report	Try: Rosie Kelly 23'; Liv McGoverne 33'; Kaipo Olsen-Baker 64'; Amy Rule 69'; Con: Rosie Kelly (3/4) 34', 65', 70'; Pen: Rosie Kelly (1/1) 3'

Sky Stadium, Wellington
Referee: Will Johnston

=== Round 3 ===
16 March 2024
14:05 (UTC+13)

Blues Women	52–5	Hurricanes Poua
Try: Grace Gago 40'; Tafito Lafaele 42'; Katelyn Vaha'akolo (3) 48', 53', 74'; Niall Williams-Guthrie 51'; Jaymie Kolose 58'; Maia Roos 67'; Con: Krysten Cottrell (6/8) 43', 50', 53', 59', 68', 75'	Report	Try: Harmony Kautai 80'; Cards: Cristo Taufua (yellow card) 36'

Bell Park, Pakuranga
Referee: Angus Mabey

16 March 2024
16:35 (UTC+13)

Chiefs Manawa	38–22	Matatū
Try: Tanya Kalounivale 19'; Victoria Edmonds 25'; Luka Connor (3) 34', 40', 57'; Krystal Murray 75'; Con: Renee Holmes (4/6) 20', 26', 35', 58'	Report	Try: Charlotte Woodham 45'; Alana Bremner 54'; Winnie Palamo 67'; Con: Rosie Kelly (2/3) 46', 55'; Pen: Liv McGoverne (1/1) 17'

FMG Stadium Waikato, Hamilton
Referee: Tiana Anderson

=== Round 4 ===
22 March 2024
16:35 (UTC+13)

Hurricanes Poua	12–43	Chiefs Manawa
Try: Monica Tagoai 13'; Elinor-Plum King 48'; Con: Isabella Waterman (1/2) 49'; Cards: Elinor-Plum King (yellow card) 72'	Report	Try: Seina Saito (2) 11', 45'; Mererangi Paul 40+1'; Chelsea Semple 58'; Ruby Tui 64'; Victoria Edmonds 75'; Chyna Hohepa 79'; Con: Chelsea Semple (2/4) 12', 46'; Ariana Bayler (2/3) 65', 80'

Central Energy Trust Arena, Palmerston North
Referee: Taneika Uerata

23 March 2024
16:35 (UTC+13)

Blues Women	27 –17	Matatū
Try: Katelyn Vaha'akolo 20'; Krysten Cottrell 56'; Aldora Itunu 64'; Angelica Mekemeke Vahai 80+1'; Con: Krysten Cottrell (2/4) 57', 80+2'; Pen: Krysten Cottrell (1/1) 18'; Cards: Eloise Blackwell (yellow card) 34'	Report	Try: Georgia Ponsonby (2) 14', 47'; Di Hiini 51'; Con: Rosie Kelly (1/3) 48'

Eden Park, Auckland
Referee: Tiana Anderson

=== Round 5 ===
29 March 2024
16:35 (UTC+13)

Matatū	37–17	Hurricanes Poua
Try: Rosie Kelly 12'; Grace Brooker 18'; Georgia Ponsonby (2) 28', 40'; Martha Mataele 53'; Lucy Jenkins (2) 56', 73'; Con: Liv McGoverne (1/4) 40+1'	Report	Try: Layla Sae 42'; Monica Tagoai 64'; Rangimarie Sturmey 80+2'; Con: Isabella Waterman (1/3) 43'; Cards: Shakira Baker (red card) 55'

Apollo Projects Stadium, Christchurch
Referee: Maggie Cogger-Orr

30 March 2024
14:05 (UTC+13)

Chiefs Manawa	26–40	Blues Women
Try: Ruby Tui 18'; Luka Connor 38'; Krystal Murray 65'; Chelsea Semple 75'; Con: Renee Holmes (2/3) 19', 76'; Ariana Bayler (1/1) 40'; Cards: Renee Holmes (yellow card) 30'	Report	Try: Aldora Itunu 11'; Grace Gago 27'; Penalty try 30'; Sylvia Brunt 32'; Maia Roos 55'; Cheyenne Tuli-Fale 78'; Con: Krysten Cottrell (4/5) 12', 28', 34', 79'; Cards: Sylvia Brunt (yellow card) 48'

FMG Stadium Waikato, Hamilton
Referee: Natarsha Ganley

=== Round 6 ===
6 April 2024
14:05 (UTC+13)

Hurricanes Poua	29–41	Blues Women
Try: Monica Tagoai 27'; Iritana Hohaia 33'; Layla Sae 70'; Harmony Kautai 80+3'; Con: Hannah King (3/4) 34', 71', 80+4'; Pen: Hannah King (1/1) 21'	Report	Try: Aldora Itunu 3'; Ruahei Demant 6'; Katelyn Vaha'akolo (2) 8', 49'; Grace Gago 38'; Chryss Viliko 57'; Jaymie Kolose 78'; Con: Krysten Cottrell (2/4) 7', 39'; Patricia Maliepo (1/2) 50'; Cards: Eloise Blackwell (yellow card) 60'; Grace Gago (yellow card) 67'

Horowhenua Community Trust Levin Domain, Levin
Referee: Marcus Playle

6 April 2024
16:35 (GMT +13)

Matatū	22–20	Chiefs Manawa
Try: Georgia Ponsonby 6'; Winnie Palamo 19'; Amy du Plessis 66'; Liv McGoverne 72'; Con: Rosie Kelly (1/4) 20'	Report	Try: Mia Anderson 8'; Kennedy Simon 32'; Renee Holmes 47'; Con: Renee Holmes (1/3) 33'; Pen: Renee Holmes (1/1) 57'

Ngā Puna Wai, Christchurch
Referee: Fraser Hannon

== Final ==
13 April 2024
16:05 (UTC+12)

Blues Women	24–18	Chiefs Manawa
Try: Katelyn Vaha'akolo (2) 35', 72'; Kahlia Awa 65'; Liana Mikaele-Tu'u 78'; Con: Krysten Cottrell (2/4) 74', 79'	Report	Try: Renee Holmes 5'; Mia Anderson 54'; Con: Renee Holmes (1/2) 55'; Pen: Renee Holmes (2/2) 33', 60'

Eden Park, Auckland
Referee: Natarsha Ganley

LP	1	(New Zealand) Chryss Viliko
HK	2	(New Zealand) Grace Gago
TP	3	(New Zealand) Aldora Itunu
LL	4	(New Zealand) Eloise Blackwell
RL	5	(New Zealand) Ma'ama Vaipulu
BF	6	(New Zealand) Maia Roos (cc)
OF	7	(New Zealand) Niall Guthrie
N8	8	(New Zealand) Liana Mikaele-Tu'u
SH	9	(New Zealand) Mel Puckett
FH	10	(New Zealand) Krysten Cottrell
LW	11	(New Zealand) Jaymie Kolose
IC	12	(New Zealand) Ruahei Demant (cc)
OC	13	(New Zealand) Daynah Nankivell
RW	14	(New Zealand) Katelyn Vaha'akolo
FB	15	(New Zealand) Patricia Maliepo
Replacements:
HK	16	(Japan) Nijiho Nagata
PR	17	(New Zealand) Maddi Robinson
PR	18	(New Zealand) Cheyenne Tuli-Fale
LF	19	(New Zealand) Charmaine McMenamin
LF	20	(New Zealand) Elizabith Moimoi
SH	21	(New Zealand) Kahlia Awa
OC	22	(New Zealand) Kerri Johnson / Angelica Mekemeke Vahai
WG	23	(New Zealand) Renee Woodman-Wickliffe
Coach:
(New Zealand) Willie Walker

LP	1	(New Zealand) Kate Henwood
HK	2	(New Zealand) Luka Connor
TP	3	(New Zealand) Tanya Kalounivale
LL	4	(New Zealand) Charmaine Smith
RL	5	(New Zealand) Chelsea Bremner
BF	6	(New Zealand) Mia Anderson
OF	7	(New Zealand) Kennedy Simon (c)
N8	8	(New Zealand) Chyna Hohepa
SH	9	(New Zealand) Arihiana Marino-Tauhinu
FH	10	(New Zealand) Hazel Tubic
LW	11	(New Zealand) Reese Anderson
IC	12	(New Zealand) Grace Steinmetz
OC	13	(New Zealand) Mererangi Paul
RW	14	(New Zealand) Ruby Tui
FB	15	(New Zealand) Renee Holmes
Replacements:
HK	16	(New Zealand) Vici-Rose Green
PR	17	(New Zealand) Krystal Murray
PR	18	(Fiji) Bitila Tawake
LK	19	(New Zealand) Grace Kukutai
LF	20	(New Zealand) Victoria Edmonds
SH	21	(New Zealand) Ariana Bayler
FH	22	(New Zealand) Chelsea Semple
OC	23	(New Zealand) Azalleyah Maaka
Coach:
(New Zealand) Crystal Kaua

Assistant referees:
Maggie Cogger-Orr (New Zealand)
Chloe Sampson (New Zealand)

== Statistics ==
As of 13th April 2024

=== Leading point scorers ===
No.	Player	Team	Points	Average	Details
1	(New Zealand) Krysten Cottrell	(New Zealand) Blues	49	7	2 T, 18 C, 1 P, 0 D
2	(New Zealand) Renee Holmes	(New Zealand) Chiefs	48	6.8	2 T, 13 C, 4 P, 0 D
3	(New Zealand) Katelyn Vaha'akolo	(New Zealand) Blues	40	5.7	8 T, 0 C, 0 P, 0 D
4	(New Zealand) Luka Connor	(New Zealand) Chiefs	30	4.3	6 T, 0 C, 0 P, 0 D
5	(New Zealand) Rosie Kelly	(New Zealand) Matatū	29	4.8	2 T, 8 C, 1 P, 0 D
6	(New Zealand) Georgia Ponsonby	(New Zealand) Matatū	25	4.2	5 T, 0 C, 0 P, 0 D
7	(New Zealand) Ruby Tui	(New Zealand) Chiefs	20	2.8	4 T, 0 C, 0 P, 0 D
7	(New Zealand) Monica Tagoai	(New Zealand) Hurricanes	20	3.33	4 T, 0 C, 0 P, 0 D
7	(New Zealand) Jaymie Kolose	(New Zealand) Matatū	20	3.33	4 T, 0 C, 0 P, 0 D
10	(New Zealand) Aldora Itunu	(New Zealand) Blues	15	2.14	3 T, 0 C, 0 P, 0 D

=== Leading try scorers ===
No.	Player	Team	Tries	Average
1	(New Zealand) Katelyn Vaha'akolo	(New Zealand) Blues	8	1.14
2	(New Zealand) Luka Connor	(New Zealand) Chiefs	6	0.86
3	(New Zealand) Georgia Ponsonby	(New Zealand) Matatū	5	0.83
4	(New Zealand) Ruby Tui	(New Zealand) Chiefs	4	0.6
4	(New Zealand) Monica Tagoai	(New Zealand) Hurricanes	4	0.7
4	(New Zealand) Jaymie Kolose	(New Zealand) Blues	4	0.6
7	(New Zealand) Aldora Itunu	(New Zealand) Blues	3	0.43
7	(New Zealand) Kennedy Tukuafu	(New Zealand) Chiefs	3	0.43
7	(New Zealand) Tafito Lafaele	(New Zealand) Blues	3	0.43
7	(New Zealand) Harmony Kautai	(New Zealand) Hurricanes	3	0.5

== Players ==
=== Squads ===
The following squads have been named for the 2024 season.

Blues Women squad
Forwards	Eloise Blackwell • Dajian Brown • Rebecca Burch • Esther Faiaoga-Tilo • Sophie Fisher • Grace Gago • Aldora Itunu • Paris Mataroa • Charmaine McMenamin • Liana Mikaele-Tu′u • Elizabith Moimoi • Nijiho Nagata • Alakoka Po′oi • Maddi Robinson • Maiakawanakaulani Roos • Cheyenne Tuli-Fale • Ma′ama Vaipulu • Chryss Viliko
Backs	Kahlia Awa • Sylvia Brunt • Krysten Cottrell • Ruahei Demant • Kerri Johnson • Jaymie Kolose • Patricia Maliepo • Angelica Mekemeke-Vahai • Daynah Nankivell • Mel Puckett • Tara-Leigh Turner • Katelyn Vaha′akolo • Niall Williams-Guthrie
Coach	Willie Walker

Chiefs Manawa squad
Forwards	Mia Anderson • Chelsea Bremner • Luka Connor • Victoria Edmonds • Ashlee Gaby-Sutherland • Vici-Rose Green • Kate Henwood • Chyna Hohepa • Tanya Kalounivale • Te Urupounamu McGarvey • Krystal Murray • Seina Saito • Kennedy Simon • Charmaine Smith • Bitila Tawake
Backs	Reese Anderson • Ariana Bayler • Renee Holmes • Grace Kukutai • Azalleyah Ma′aka • Arihiana Marino-Tauhinu • Apii Nicholls • Merania Paraone • Mererangi Paul • Chelsea Semple • Grace Steinmetz • Georgia Thompson • Hazel Tubic • Ruby Tui • Olive Watherston
Coach	Crystal Kaua

Hurricanes Poua squad
Forwards	Tamia Edwards • Marilyn Fanoga • Maddie Feaunati • Rhiarna Ferris • Tori Iosefo • Joanah Ngan-Woo • Te Uarangi Olsen-Baker • Jackie Patea-Fereti • Leilani Perese • Elinor Plum-King • Cilia-Marie Po′e-Tofaeono • Rachael Rakatau • Layla Sae • Kahurangi Sturmey • Samantha Taylor • Cristo Tofa
Backs	Shakira Baker • Teilah Ferguson • Te Rauoriwa Gapper • Leilani Hakiwai • Iritana Hohaia • Harmony Kautai • Hannah King • Paige Lush • Holly-Rae Mete • Rangimarie Sturmey • Monica Tagoai • Kalyn Takitimu-Cook • Isabella Waterman
Coach	Ngatai Walker

Matatū squad
Forwards	Laura Bayfield • Alana Bremner (c) • Emma Dermody • Eilis Doyle • Tegan Hollows • Lucy Jenkins • Atlanta Lolohea • Pip Love • Leah Miles • Stacey Niao • Kaipo Olsen-Baker • Mo'omo'oga Palu • Marcelle Parkes • Georgia Ponsonby • Kendra Reynolds • Amy Rule • Fiaali'i Solomona • Holly Wratt-Groeneweg
Backs	Grace Brooker • Georgia Cormick • Cheyenne Cunningham • Amy du Plessis • Di Hiini • Maia Joseph • Rosie Kelly • Martha Mataele • Liv McGoverne • Winnie Palamo • Chey Robins-Reti • Charlotte Woodham
Coach	Whitney Hansen
