= 2022 Super Rugby Aupiki season =

- Countries: New Zealand
- Tournament format(s): Round-robin
- Champions: Chiefs Manawa (1st title)
- Matches played: 6
- Tries scored: 22 (3.67 per match)
- Top point scorer(s): Kelly Brazier (16 pts)

The 2022 Super Rugby Aupiki season is the inaugural season of Super Rugby Aupiki. The competition commenced on 10 March between Chiefs Manawa and Matatū. On 20 March, Chiefs Manawa were crowned as the inaugural champions of Super Rugby Aupiki after defeating the Blues Women 35–0 in the final round of the competition.

== Teams ==
Team	Coach	City
Blues Women	Willie Walker	Auckland, Auckland Region
Chiefs Manawa	Allan Bunting	Hamilton, Waikato
Hurricanes Poua	Wesley Clarke	Wellington, Wellington Region
Matatū	Blair Baxter	Christchurch, Canterbury

== Format ==
All four teams will get three regular season matches; one home, one away, and one Super Round fixture. The top two teams will contest the final.

The competition was later reformatted to a round robin fixture due to the impact of the COVID-19 pandemic. All the squads were strongly affected with player isolations and COVID-19 cases. The inaugural champion would be crowned based on their competition points.

== Standings ==
Rank	Team	P	W	D	L	PF	PA	TF	TA	TB	LB	+/-	BP	Pts
1	Chiefs Manawa	3	3	0	0	81	23	13	4	2	0	58	2	14
2	Hurricanes Poua	3	1	1	1	26	35	3	5	0	0	-9	0	6
3	Blues Women	3	1	1	1	21	45	3	6	0	0	-24	0	6
4	Matatū	3	0	0	3	31	56	4	8	0	1	-25	1	1

== Matches ==
=== Round 1 ===
10 March 2022	Hurricanes Poua	0–0	Blues Women	FMG Stadium Waikato, Hamilton
15:35 (GMT +13)		(Note: The Hurricanes Poua & Blues Women's match was cancelled. Hurricanes Poua was forced to withdraw from the match due to COVID cases and isolation requirements.)

10 March 2022	Chiefs Manawa	17–15	Matatū	FMG Stadium Waikato, Hamilton
19:05 (GMT +13)	Try: Angel Mulu; Ruby Tui; Kennedy Simon; Con: Kelly Brazier	Report	Try: Phillipa Love; Grace Steinmetz; Amy Rule	Referee: Maggie Cogger-Orr

=== Round 2 ===
15 March 2022	Chiefs Manawa	29–8	Hurricanes Poua	FMG Stadium Waikato, Hamilton
15:35 (GMT +13)	Try: Renee Wickcliffe; Luka Connor; Portia Woodman; Hazel Tubic; Mia Anderson; Con: Kelly Brazier (2)	Report	Try: Joanah Ngan-Woo; Pen: Carys Dallinger

15 March 2022	Blues Women	21–10	Matatū	FMG Stadium Waikato, Hamilton
19:05 (GMT +13)	Try: Krystal Murray; Mele Hufanga; Shannon Leota; Con: Patricia Maliepo (2); Krysten Cottrell	Report	Try: Martha Mataele; Con: Liv McGoverne; Pen: Liv McGoverne

=== Round 3 ===
20 March 2022	Matatū	6–18	Hurricanes Poua	FMG Stadium Waikato, Hamilton
17:05 (GMT +13)	Pen: Kendra Cocksedge (2)	Report	Try: Ayesha Leti-I'iga (2); Con: Carys Dallinger; Pen: Carys Dallinger (2)

20 March 2022	Blues Women	0–35	Chiefs Manawa	FMG Stadium Waikato, Hamilton
19:35 (GMT +13)		Report	Try: Luka Connor; Ruby Tui; Hazel Tubic; Portia Woodman; Langi Veainu; Con: Kelly Brazier (2); Pen: Kelly Brazier (2)

== Statistics ==
=== Leading point scorers ===
No.	Player	Team	Points	Average	Details
1	Kelly Brazier	Chiefs Manawa	16	5.33	0 T, 5 C, 2 P, 0 D
2	Carys Dallinger	Blues Women	11	3.67	0 T, 1 C, 3 P, 0 D
3	Luka Connor	Chiefs Manawa	10	3.33	2 T, 0 C, 0 P, 0 D
3	Ayesha Leti-I'iga	Hurricanes Poua	10	3.33	2 T, 0 C, 0 P, 0 D
3	Hazel Tubic	Chiefs Manawa	10	3.33	2 T, 0 C, 0 P, 0 D
3	Portia Woodman	Chiefs Manawa	10	3.33	2 T, 0 C, 0 P, 0 D
3	Ruby Tui	Chiefs Manawa	10	3.33	2 T, 0 C, 0 P, 0 D

=== Leading try scorers ===
No.	Player	Team	Tries	Average
1	Luka Connor	Chiefs Manawa	2	0.67
1	Ayesha Leti-I'iga	Hurricanes Poua	2	0.67
1	Hazel Tubic	Chiefs Manawa	2	0.67
1	Ruby Tui	Chiefs Manawa	2	0.67
1	Portia Woodman	Chiefs Manawa	2	0.67
6	Mia Anderson	Chiefs Manawa	1	0.33
6	Mele Hufanga	Blues Women	1	0.33
6	Shannon Leota	Blues Women	1	0.33
6	Phillipa Love	Matatū	1	0.33
6	Martha Mataele	Matatū	1	0.33
6	Angel Mulu	Chiefs Manawa	1	0.33
6	Krystal Murray	Blues Women	1	0.33
6	Joanah Ngan-Woo	Hurricanes Poua	1	0.33
6	Amy Rule	Matatū	1	0.33
6	Kennedy Simon	Chiefs Manawa	1	0.33
6	Grace Steinmetz	Matatū	1	0.33
6	Langi Veainu	Chiefs Manawa	1	0.33
6	Renee Wickcliffe	Chiefs Manawa	1	0.33

== Players ==
=== Squads ===
Blues Women squad
Forwards	Aldora Itunu • Krystal Murray • Chryss Viliko • Rebecca Todd • Cristo Tofa • Eloise Blackwell • Tafito Lafaele • Maiakawanakaulani Roos • Charmaine Smith • Vineta Teutau • Tenaija Fletcher • Liana Mikaele-Tu'u • Ilisapeta Molia • Aroha Savage • Shannon Leota • Olivia Ward-Duin • Cindy Nelles • Marie-Cilia Po’e-Tofaeono • Sophie Fisher
Backs	Tyla Nathan-Wong • Melanie Puckett • Luisa Togotogorua • Patricia Maliepo • Ruahei Demant • Theresa Fitzpatrick • Mele Hufanga • Sam Curtis • Princess Elliot • Natahlia Moors • Kalyn Takitimu-Cook • Krysten Cottrell • Shyanne Thompson
Coach	Willie Walker

Chiefs Manawa squad
Forwards	Tanya Kalounivale • Angel Mulu • Awhina Tangen-Wainohu • Santo Taumata • Jayjay Taylor • Luka Connor • Grace Houpapa-Barrett • Victoria Edmonds • Chyna Hohepa • Kelsie Wills • Les Elder • Kennedy Simon • Pia Tapsell • Harono Te Iringa
Backs	Ariana Bayler • Maia Joseph • Arihiana Marino-Tauhinu • Kelly Brazier • Hazel Tubic • Chelsea Semple • Georgia Daals • Portia Woodman • Stacey Fluhler • Carla Hohepa • Ruby Tui • Renee Wickliffe
Coach	Allan Bunting

Hurricanes Poua squad
Forwards	Leilani Perese • Isadora Leio-Laupola • Marilyn Live • Ngano Tavake • Esther Tilo-Faiaogo • Jayme Nuku • Joanah Ngan-Woo • Jackie Patea-Fereti • Rachael Rakatau • Kahurangi Sturmey • Kathleen Brown • Dhys Faleafaga • Sarah Hirini • Kaipo Olsen-Baker • Layla Sae
Backs	Ana-Maria Afuie • Iritana Hohaia • Carys Dallinger • Victoria Subritzky-Nafatali • Sapphire Abraham • Teilah Ferguson • Monica Tagoai • Janna Vaughan • Lauren Balsillie • Lyric Faleafaga • Ayesha Leti-I'iga • Cheyelle Robins-Reti • Selica Winiata
Coach	Wesley Clarke

Matatū squad
Forwards	Pip Love • Ashley Palu • Amy Rule • Stephanie Te Ohaere-Fox • Georgia Ponsonby • Chelsea Bremner • Julia Gorinski • Michaela Leonard • Alana Bremner • Kendra Reynolds • Natalie Delamere • Lucy Jenkins • Greer Muir • Marcelle Parkes
Backs	Kendra Cocksedge • Di Hiini • Terauoriwa Gapper • Rosie Kelly • Arabella McKenzie • Lucy Anderson • Grace Brooker • Amy du Plessis • Liv McGoverne • Renee Holmes • Martha Mataele • Kilisitina Moata'ane • Grace Steinmetz
Coach	Blair Baxter
