= 2023 Super Rugby Aupiki season =

- Countries: New Zealand
- Tournament format(s): Round-robin and knockout
- Champions: Matatū (1st title)
- Matches played: 10
- Tries scored: 96 (9.6 per match)
- Top point scorer(s): Renee Holmes, Matatū (59)
- Top try scorer(s): Luka Connor, Chiefs Manawa (7)
- Official website: Official site

The 2023 Super Rugby Aupiki season was the second season of Super Rugby Aupiki (known as Sky Super Rugby Aupiki for sponsorship reasons), a professional women's rugby union club competition organised by New Zealand Rugby. The competition ran from 25 February 2023 – when Hurricanes Poua and Chiefs Manawa played the opening match in Levin – to 25 March 2023.

The tournament was won by Matatū, who defeated Chiefs Manawa 33–31 in the final in Hamilton, earning them their first Super Rugby Aupiki title. That match also resulted in the Chiefs Manawa's first-ever loss in the two-year-old competition.

== Competition format ==
The competition featured four teams, who each played three regular season matches and two play-off matches. A total of ten matches were played over five weeks. The semi-finals were played on Sunday 19 March 2023 and the finals – which also included a third place play-off – on Saturday 25 March 2023.

== Standings ==
The standings at the end of the round-robin of the 2023 Super Rugby Aupiki season were:

2023 Super Rugby Aupiki standings
Pos	Team	P	W	D	L	PF	PA	PD	TF	TA	TB	LB	Pts
1	Chiefs Manawa	3	3	0	0	149	92	57	23	14	1	0	13
2	Matatū	3	1	0	2	95	102	–7	15	16	0	1	5
3	Blues Women	3	1	0	2	95	105	–10	15	15	0	1	5
4	Hurricanes Poua	3	1	0	2	68	108	–40	10	18	0	0	4
Legend
P = Games played, W = Games won, D = Games drawn, L = Games lost, PF = Points for, PA = Points against, PD = Points difference, TF = Tries for, TA = Tries against, TB = Try bonus points, LB = Losing bonus points, Pts = Competition points

Source: Sky Super Rugby Aupiki – Team standings

== Matches ==
=== Round 1 ===
25 February 2023	Hurricanes Poua	21–53	Chiefs Manawa	Levin Domain, Levin
14:05 (GMT +13)	Try: Te Kura Ngata-Aerengamate 2'; Ayesha Leti-I'iga 5'; Rhiarna Ferris 21'; Con: Carys Dallinger (3/3) 4', 7', 22'; Cards: Krystal Murray (yellow card) 37' to 46'	Report	Try: Luka Connor (3) 9', 40+1', 59'; Tanya Kalounivale 26'; Kennedy Simon 34'; Chelsea Bremner 45'; Georgia Daals 48'; Arihiana Marino-Tauhinu 52'; Dhys Faleafaga 77'; Con: Hazel Tubic (1/4) 26'; Tenika Willison (3/5) 46', 49', 78'	Referee: Maggie Cogger-Orr

25 February 2023	Matatū	33–31	Blues Women	Forsyth Barr Stadium, Dunedin
16:45 (GMT +13)	Try: Kendra Reynolds 6'; Alana Bremner 18'; Martha Mataele 27'; Di Hiini 32'; Lucy Jenkins 44'; Con: Renee Holmes (4/5) 7', 19', 34', 45'; Cards: Alana Bremner (yellow card) 49' to 59'	Report	Try: Grace Gago 30'; Jaymie Kolose (2) 39', 51'; Katelyn Vaha'akolo 64'; Sophie Fisher 80+2'; Con: Ruahei Demant (3/5) 31', 40', 52'	Referee: Brendon Pickerill

=== Round 2 ===
4 March 2023	Blues Women	33–50	Chiefs Manawa	North Harbour Stadium, Albany
14:05 (GMT +13)	Try: Jaymie Kolose (2) 15', 74'; Ma'ama Vaipulu (2) 50', 56'; Maiakawanakaulani Roos 71'; Con: Ruahei Demant (3/3) 16', 50', 58'; Krysten Cottrell (1/2) 72'	Report	Try: Luka Connor 11'; Georgia Daals (2) 24', 61'; Mererangi Paul (3) 30', 40+1', 63'; Grace Houpapa-Barrett 77'; Con: Hazel Tubic (6/6) 13', 25', 31', 40+3', 62', 64'; Amanda Rasch (0/1); Pen: Hazel Tubic (1/1) 9'	Referee: Natarsha Ganley

4 March 2023	Matatū	24–25	Hurricanes Poua	Orangetheory Stadium, Christchurch
16:45 (GMT +13)	Try: Kendra Reynolds 10'; Renee Holmes (2) 39', 70'; Grace Brooker 40+2'; Con: Renee Holmes (2/4) 40', 40+3'; Pen: Renee Holmes (0/1)	Report	Try: Ayesha Leti-I'iga 27'; Autumn-Rain Stephens-Daly (2) 42', 63'; Joanah Ngan-Woo 58'; Con: Carys Dallinger (1/4) 59'; Pen: Isabella Waterman (1/1) 37'	Referee: Mike Winter

=== Round 3 ===
11 March 2023	Chiefs Manawa	46–38	Matatū	FMG Stadium Waikato, Hamilton
14:05 (GMT +13)	Try: Mererangi Paul 15'; Luka Connor 24'; Kennedy Simon 32'; Georgia Daals (2) 39', 44'; Tynealle Fitzgerald 40+4'; Grace Houpapa-Barrett 66'; Con: Hazel Tubic (3/5) 25', 40', 40+5'; Tenika Willison (1/2) 45'; Pen: Hazel Tubic (1/2) 19'	Report	Try: Chey Robins-Reti 3'; Rosie Kelly 16'; Grace Steinmetz 22'; Natalie Delamere 72'; Lucy Jenkins 75'; Grace Brooker 79'; Con: Renee Holmes (4/6) 4', 22', 73', 79'	Referee: Maggie Cogger-Orr

11 March 2023	Hurricanes Poua	22–31	Blues Women	Sky Stadium, Wellington
16:45 (GMT +13)	Try: Autumn-Rain Stephens-Daly (2) 27', 49'; Joanah Ngan-Woo 42'; Con: Carys Dallinger (2/3) 28', 43'; Pen: Isabella Waterman (1/2) 64'; Cards: Ayesha Leti-I'iga (yellow card) 10' to 20'	Report	Try: Katelyn Vaha'akolo 13'; Ruahei Demant 45'; Patricia Maliepo (2) 73', 80'; Krysten Cottrell 76'; Con: Ruahei Demant (1/2) 47'; Krysten Cottrell (2/3) 77', 80+1'	Referee: Nick Hogan

== Finals ==
Chiefs Manawa finished top of the table after winning all their matches during the regular season. In their semi-final, they faced fourth-placed Hurricanes Poua. Second-placed Matatū, who recorded their first-ever Super Rugby Aupiki win this season, took on Blues Women in the other semi-final. Both semifinal matches were played at the North Harbour Stadium in Albany on 19 March 2023.

Chiefs Manawa continued their winning streak in the semi-final by defeating Hurricanes Poua 43–21, while Matatū reached the final after a narrow 26–23 win over Blues Women. The final between Chiefs Manawa and Matatū, as well as the third-place play-off between Blues Women and Hurricanes Poua, were played at FMG Stadium Waikato on 25 March 2023.

The 2023 final was the first Super Rugby Aupiki final in the young competition's history, after the competition was reformatted to a round robin tournament in 2022, due to the impact of the COVID-19 pandemic. Matatū were crowned as the new Super Rugby Aupiki champions after defeating Chiefs Manawa 33–31 in the final. It was Matatū's first title win and Chiefs Manawa's first-ever loss in Super Rugby Aupiki.

Semi-finals
Matatū	26
Blues Women	23
Chiefs Manawa	43
Hurricanes Poua	21

Final
Matatū	33
Chiefs Manawa	31
3rd Place
Hurricanes Poua	29
Blues Women	24

=== Semifinals ===
19 March 2023	Matatū	26–23	Blues Women	North Harbour Stadium, Albany
15:15 (GMT +13)	Try: Kendra Reynolds 14'; Chey Robins-Reti (3) 34', 40', 72'; Con: Renee Holmes (3/4) 15', 40+2', 73'	Report	Try: Katelyn Vaha'akolo 18'; Patricia Maliepo 49'; Liana Mikaele-Tu'u 69'; Con: Krysten Cottrell (1/3) 50'; Pen: Krysten Cottrell (2/2) 4', 9'	Referee: Mike Winter

19 March 2023	Chiefs Manawa	43–21	Hurricanes Poua	North Harbour Stadium, Albany
18:05 (GMT +13)	Try: Carla Hohepa 3'; Tenika Willison (2) 12', 59'; Luka Connor 20'; Kennedy Simon 43'; Mererangi Paul 70'; Con: Tenika Willison (5/6) 4', 13', 21', 45', 60'; Pen: Hazel Tubic (1/1) 77'	Report	Try: Te Kura Ngata-Aerengamate 7'; Kaipo Olsen-Baker 40+4'; Layla Sae 55'; Con: Isabella Waterman (3/3) 8', 40+5', 56'; Cards: Joanah Ngan-Woo (yellow card) 68' to 80'	Referee: Natarsha Ganley

=== Third place play-off ===
25 March 2023	Blues Women	24–29	Hurricanes Poua	FMG Stadium Waikato, Hamilton
11:35 (GMT +13)	Try: Jaymie Kolose 31'; Grace Gago 38'; Tafito Lafaele 46'; Holly Williams 79'; Con: Krysten Cottrell (2/4) 32', 39'; Cards: Katelyn Vaha'akolo (yellow card) 50' to 60'	Report	Try: Autumn-Rain Stephens-Daly 4'; Monica Tagoai (2) 13', 17'; Isabella Waterman 50'; Con: Isabella Waterman (3/4) 6', 15', 18'; Pen: Isabella Waterman (1/1) 77'	Referee: Natarsha Ganley

=== Final ===
25 March 2023
14:05 (GMT +13)

Chiefs Manawa	31–33	Matatū
Try: Tanya Kalounivale (2) 4', 18'; Arihiana Marino-Tauhinu 12'; Mererangi Paul 36'; Luka Connor 78'; Con: Tenika Willison (3/5) 6', 20', 37'; Pen: Tenika Willison (0/1)	Report	Try: Amy Rule 23'; Renee Holmes (2) 25', 58'; Martha Mataele 31'; Con: Renee Holmes (2/4) 24', 33'; Pen: Renee Holmes (3/4) 30', 64', 74'

FMG Stadium Waikato, Hamilton
Referee: Nick Hogan

Chiefs Manawa:
LP	1	(New Zealand) Kate Henwood
HK	2	(New Zealand) Luka Connor
TP	3	(New Zealand) Tanya Kalounivale
LL	4	(New Zealand) Kelsie Thwaites
RL	5	(New Zealand) Chelsea Bremner
BF	6	(New Zealand) Charmaine Smith
OF	7	(New Zealand) Tynealle Fitzgerald
N8	8	(New Zealand) Kennedy Simon (c)
SH	9	(New Zealand) Arihiana Marino-Tauhinu (vc)
FH	10	(New Zealand) Hazel Tubic
LW	11	(New Zealand) Georgia Daals
IC	12	(New Zealand) Azalleyah Maaka
OC	13	(New Zealand) Carla Hohepa
RW	14	(New Zealand) Mererangi Paul
FB	15	(New Zealand) Tenika Willison
Replacements:
HK	16	(New Zealand) Grace Houpapa-Barrett
PR	17	(New Zealand) Angel Mulu
PR	18	(New Zealand) Te Urupounamu McGarvey
LK	19	(New Zealand) Dhys Faleafaga
LF	20	(New Zealand) Victoria Makea
SH	21	(New Zealand) Violet Hapi-Wise
BK	22	(New Zealand) Abigail Roache
CE	23	(New Zealand) Olive Watherston
Coach:
(New Zealand) Crystal Kaua

Matatū:
LP	1	(New Zealand) Pip Love
HK	2	(New Zealand) Georgia Ponsonby
TP	3	(New Zealand) Amy Rule
LL	4	(New Zealand) Emma Dermody
RL	5	(Canada) Cindy Nelles
BF	6	(New Zealand) Lucy Jenkins
OF	7	(New Zealand) Kendra Reynolds
N8	8	(New Zealand) Alana Bremner (c)
SH	9	(New Zealand) Di Hiini
FH	10	(New Zealand) Rosie Kelly
LW	11	(New Zealand) Martha Mataele
IC	12	(New Zealand) Grace Brooker
OC	13	(New Zealand) Amy du Plessis
RW	14	(New Zealand) Chey Robins-Reti
FB	15	(New Zealand) Renee Holmes
Replacements:
HK	16	(New Zealand) Nat Delamere
PR	17	(New Zealand) Mo'omo'oga Palu
PR	18	(New Zealand) Steph Te Ohaere-Fox
LK	19	(Australia) Sera Naiqama
LF	20	(New Zealand) Marcelle Parkes
SH	21	(Australia) Georgia Cormick
BK	22	(New Zealand) Atlanta Lolohea
BK	23	(New Zealand) Charntay Poko
Coach:
(New Zealand) Blair Baxter

Assistant Referees:
Scott McKenzie (New Zealand)
Cassie Watt (New Zealand)
Television match official:
Aaron Paterson (New Zealand)

== Statistics ==
As of 25 March 2023

=== Leading point scorers ===
No.	Player	Team	Points	Details
1	(New Zealand) Renee Holmes	Matatū	59	4 T, 15 C, 3 P, 0 D
2	(New Zealand) Luka Connor	Chiefs Manawa	35	7 T, 0 C, 0 P, 0 D
3	(New Zealand) Tenika Willison	Chiefs Manawa	34	2 T, 12 C, 0 P, 0 D
4	(New Zealand) Mererangi Paul	Chiefs Manawa	30	6 T, 0 C, 0 P, 0 D
5	(New Zealand) Hazel Tubic	Chiefs Manawa	29	0 T, 10 C, 3 P, 0 D
6	(New Zealand) Isabella Waterman	Hurricanes Poua	26	1 T, 6 C, 3 P, 0 D
7	(New Zealand) Georgia Daals	Chiefs Manawa	25	5 T, 0 C, 0 P, 0 D
7	(New Zealand) Jaymie Kolose	Blues Women	25	5 T, 0 C, 0 P, 0 D
7	(New Zealand) Autumn-Rain Stephens-Daly	Hurricanes Poua	25	5 T, 0 C, 0 P, 0 D
10	(New Zealand) Krysten Cottrell	Blues Women	23	1 T, 6 C, 2 P, 0 D

Source: Sky Super Rugby Aupiki: Player Stats

=== Leading try scorers ===
No.	Player	Team	Tries
1	(New Zealand) Luka Connor	Chiefs Manawa	7
2	(New Zealand) Mererangi Paul	Chiefs Manawa	6
3	(New Zealand) Georgia Daals	Chiefs Manawa	5
3	(New Zealand) Jaymie Kolose	Blues Women	5
3	(New Zealand) Autumn-Rain Stephens-Daly	Hurricanes Poua	5
6	(New Zealand) Renee Holmes	Matatū	4
6	(New Zealand) Chey Robins-Reti	Matatū	4
8	5 players		3

Source: Sky Super Rugby Aupiki: Player Stats

=== Discipline ===
Player	Team	Red	Yellow	Round (vs. Opponent)
(New Zealand) Alana Bremner	Matatū	0	1	Round 1 (vs. Blues Women)
(New Zealand) Ayesha Leti-I'iga	Hurricanes Poua	0	1	Round 3 (vs. Blues Women)
(New Zealand) Krystal Murray	Hurricanes Poua	0	1	Round 1 (vs. Chiefs Manawa)
(New Zealand) Joanah Ngan-Woo	Hurricanes Poua	0	1	Semi-final (vs. Chiefs Manawa)
(New Zealand) Katelyn Vaha'akolo	Blues Women	0	1	Third place play-off (vs. Hurricanes Poua)

== Players ==
=== Squads ===
The following squads have been named for the 2023 season. Players listed in italics denote non-original squad members:

Blues Women squad
Forwards	Eloise Blackwell • Dajian Brown • Joanna Fanene Lolo • Esther Faiaoga-Tilo • Sophie Fisher • Grace Gago • Tafito Lafaele • Letelemalanuola Lavea • Shannon Leota • Charmaine McMenamin • Liana Mikaele-Tu'u • Toka Natua • Alakoka Po'oi • Maia Roos • Cheyenne Tuli-Fale • Ma'ama Vaipulu • Chryss Viliko
Backs	Ariana Bayler • Sylvia Brunt • Krysten Cottrell • Kiritapu Demant • Ruahei Demant • Hayley Hutana • Jaymie Kolose • Patricia Maliepo • Melanie Puckett • Tara Turner • Katelyn Vaha'akolo • Holly Williams
Coach	Willie Walker

Chiefs Manawa squad
Forwards	Chelsea Bremner • Luka Connor • Dhys Faleafaga • Tynealle Fitzgerald • Kate Henwood • Chyna Hohepa • Grace Houpapa-Barrett • Tanya Kalounivale • Victoria Makea • Te Urupounamu McGarvey • Angel Mulu • Kennedy Simon • Charmaine Smith • Awhina Tangen-Wainohu • Santo Taumata • Harono Te Iringa • Kelsie Wills
Backs	Georgia Daals • Violet Hapi-Wise • Carla Hohepa • Azalleyah Maaka • Arihiana Marino-Tauhinu • Apii Nicholls-Pualau • Mererangi Paul • Amanda Rasch • Abigail Roache • Hazel Tubic • Langi Veainu • Olive Watherston • Tenika Willison
Coach	Crystal Kaua

Hurricanes Poua squad
Forwards	Saphire Abraham • Maddie Fe'aunati • Rhiarna Ferris • Baye Jacob • Krystal Murray • Joanah Ngan-Woo • Te Kura Ngata-Aerengamate • Kaipo Olsen-Baker • Jackie Patea-Fereti • Leilani Perese • Cilia-Marie Po'e-Tofaeono • Rachel Rakatau • Layla Sae • Aroha Savage • Kahurangi Sturmey • Sosoli Talawadua • Cristo Tofa
Backs	Kahlia Awa • Shakira Baker • Carys Dallinger • Teilah Ferguson • Iritana Hohaia • Ayesha Leti-I'iga • Milly Mackey • Crystal Mayes • Bernadette Robertson • Autumn-Rain Stephens-Daly • Victoria Subritzky-Nafatali • Monica Tagoai • Isabella Waterman
Coach	Victoria Grant

Matatū squad
Forwards	Alana Bremner • Natalie Delamere • Emma Dermody • Eilis Doyle • Lucy Jenkins • Atlanta Lolohea • Phillipa Love • Leah Miles • Sera Naiqama • Cindy Nelles • Mo'omo'oga Palu • Marcelle Parkes • Georgia Ponsonby • Kendra Reynolds • Amy Rule • Stephanie Te Ohaere-Fox
Backs	Grace Brooker • Georgia Cormick • Cheyenne Cunningham • Te Rauoriwa Gapper • Di Hiini • Renee Holmes • Rosie Kelly • Martha Mataele • Amy du Plessis • Charntay Poko • Chey Robins-Reti • Grace Steinmetz
Coach	Blair Baxter
