= Krystal Murray =

New Zealand international rugby league footballer

Personal information
- Born: 16 June 1993 (age 33) Kaitaia, New Zealand
- Height: 1.72 m (5 ft 8 in)
- Weight: 97 kg (15 st 4 lb)

Playing information
Representative
Years	Team	Pld	T	G	FG	P
2017	New Zealand	5	5			20

Rugby union career
- Position: Prop
Provincial / State sides
Years	Team	Apps	(Points)
2014–2015	Manawatu	3	(0)
2016	Counties Manukau	8	(35)
2019–Present	Northland	34	(216)
Super Rugby
Years	Team	Apps	(Points)
2021–2022	Blues Women	3	(5)
2023	Hurricanes Poua	5	(0)
2024–Present	Chiefs Manawa	13	(10)
International career
Years	Team	Apps	(Points)
2021–2023	New Zealand	14	(15)
Medal record
Women's rugby union
Representing New Zealand
Rugby World Cup
Gold medal – first place	2021 New Zealand	Team competition

Krystal Murray (born 16 June 1993) is a dual code international rugby player for New Zealand. She competed for the Kiwi Ferns at the 2017 Women's Rugby League World Cup in Australia. She then made her test debut for the Black Ferns in 2021, she was a member of their 2021 Rugby World Cup champion squad. She also plays for Hurricanes Poua in the Super Rugby Aupiki competition and represents Northland provincially.

== Rugby League Career ==
Murray represented New Zealand at the 2017 Women's Rugby League World Cup.

== Rugby Union Career ==
Murray currently plays rugby union for the Northland Kauri in the Farah Palmer Cup. She played for the Blues against the Chiefs in the first-ever women's Super Rugby match in New Zealand on 1 May 2021.

Murray made her international debut for the New Zealand Black Ferns against England on 31 October 2021 at Exeter.

On 3 November 2021, She was named in the Blues squad for the inaugural Super Rugby Aupiki competition. She was named in the Blues starting line up for their first game, she scored a try against Matatū in their 21–10 victory. She started in their 0–35 trouncing by the Chiefs Manawa in the final round.

She was named in the Black Ferns squad for the 2022 Pacific Four Series. She played in the first test of the series against the Wallaroos. She was recalled into the team for a two-test series against the Wallaroos for the Laurie O'Reilly Cup in August.

Murray was selected for the Black Ferns 2021 Rugby World Cup 32-player squad. She scored a try in the second pool game against Wales. She came off the bench in the World Cup final against England, and scored a try only three minutes after running onto the field.

She signed with Hurricanes Poua for the second season of Super Rugby Aupiki. On 28 November 2023, it was announced that she had joined the Chiefs Manawa for the 2024 Aupiki season.

In July 2025, she was named in the Black Ferns XVs side for a trial match against the Black Ferns in Whangārei.
