= Cindy Nelles =

Canadian rugby union player (born 1993)

- Height: 5 ft 11 in (1.80 m)
- Weight: 81 kg (179 lb)
- School: St. Theresa Catholic Secondary School
- University: McMaster University
- Occupation: Civil engineer
- Height and weight correct as of April 16, 2021

Rugby union career
- Position: Lock
Provincial / State sides
| Years | Team | Apps | (Points) |
| 2019–2020 | Canterbury | 15 | (40) |
Super Rugby
| Years | Team | Apps | (Points) |
| 2022 | Blues Women | 2 | (0) |
| 2023 | Matatū | 5 | (0) |
International career
| Years | Team | Apps | (Points) |
| 2014–present | Canada | 19 | |
Medal record
Women's rugby union
Representing Canada
Women's Rugby World Cup
| Silver medal – second place | 2014 France | Team competition |

Cindy Nelles is a Canadian rugby union player who played lock for Canterbury, Matatū and the Canada women's national rugby union team. She has played for her national side at the 2014 Women's Rugby World Cup, where she won a silver medal as an injury replacement, and the 2017 Women's Rugby World Cup. Nelles has played for Canada 19 times. She was a successful rugby union player at college level, winning McMaster University's first CIS rugby union title as well as multiple awards and honours. Nelles helped Canterbury to win the 2019 and 2020 Farah Palmer Cup. Nelles also helped Matatu capture their first ever Super Rugby Aupiki championship in the 2023 Super Rugby Aupiki season.

== Biography ==
Nelles was raised in Belleville, Ontario. Nelles was educated at St. Theresa Catholic Secondary School, graduating in mid-2011. She matriculated to McMaster University in Hamilton, Ontario, studying civil engineering. She graduated with honours in 2016. As of 2021, Nelles is listed as 5 ft 11 in (1.80 m) and weighs 81 kg (179 lb) according to her biographies on the websites of Rugby Canada and McMaster Marauders. She plays in the lock position in rugby union, and is employed as a civil engineer in New Zealand while continuing her rugby career. Nelles was a spokesperson for Bell Let's Talk promoting mental health problem awareness.

As a child, Nelles played football, ice hockey and volleyball. She took up touch rugby with the Belleville Bulldogs youth program at age 10, after receiving encouragement from her father. She grew fond of rugby, playing the sport at the high school, provincial, and age grade levels. Nelles made her debut at the international level for Canada at the four-game 2011 Under 20s Nations Cup in Santa Barbara, California, placing third out of four teams with a 2–2 record. She was supported by capital that had been raised by her friends, family, sponsors, and an organized barbecue bash. Nelles captained the McMaster Marauders rugby union women's team. She was named the 2011 Russell Division Rookie of the Year. In her 2013 season, Nelles scored eight tries, accumulating 44 points in five regular-season competitions. This placed her seventh in the Ontario University Athletics player rankings, and was named to the OUA Russell Division All-Star Team and as a CIS All-Canadian selection.

In 2015, Nelles achieved two tries in winning the CIS Championship in Kingston, Ontario for McMaster for the first time ever, earning her CIS Player of the Year and CIS Player of the Tournament honours. She was named the recipient of the Therese Quigley Award as McMaster Marauders Female Athlete of the Year. Nelles also won the 2015 Robinson-Kelleher Memorial Award as the Athlete of the Year for Belleville in May 2016. She was the first rugby player to earn the accolade. Nelles earned the Americas Rugby Breakout Player of the Year Award from North and South America over three male players. She was named to the Dean's Honour List three times from 2014 to 2016, three-time Marauder Scholar Award winner between 2013 and 2016, and a former winner of the Ronald V. Joyce Award for Combining Outstanding Athletic and Academic Performance. Nelles was employed as head coach for the senior girl's rugby club of Westdale Secondary School for its spring season.

She spent one year away from rugby to allow herself to recover from injury and then began to train with her fellow Canadian players. Nelles was selected to be head coach of the Toronto-based Elites Reds club. Not long after, she relocated to Christchurch, New Zealand to take up a career in semi-professional rugby. Nelles offered her services to the local provincial rugby union for the 2018 domestic season but did not get a response. She played club rugby for a short period before joining defending Farah Palmer Cup winners Canterbury. On October 31, 2020, the final of the 2020 Farah Palmer Cup, Nelles helped Canterbury win its fourth provincial title in succession when she scored a match-winning try on 81 minutes to beat Waikato 8–7 in Christchurch.

At the international level, she made her debut for the Canada Maple Leafs senior women's developmental national team as captain on a two-match tour of England. She was called up as an injury replacement for flanker Barbara Mervin in the Canada women's national silver-medal side in the last three weeks of the 2014 Women's Rugby World Cup, which lost 21–9 to England in the final. Nelles played for the Canada women's national rugby union team at the 2015 Women's Rugby Super Series in Alberta. Nelles was named as one of 25 players to Canada's 2017 Can Am rugby team for the series held in San Diego after doing a one-week training camp in Vancouver Island. She went on to play three matches for Canada at the 2017 Women's Rugby World Cup, scoring a single second-half semi-final try against Wales to finish in fifth position. Overall, Nelles has played for the national Canada team 19 times. In November 2020, she was named to the New Zealand Barbarians team that lost 19–17 to the New Zealand national side at Trafalgar Park, Nelson.

In 2022, Cindy was named to the Blues's Squad to compete in Super Rugby Aupiki, the first ever season of women's professional rugby in New Zealand. There she played two games for the team at second row. In the first game they won against Matatū 21–10 and in their second game they lost to Chiefs Manawa 35–0.

In the 2023 Super Rugby Aupiki season Cindy switched teams to play for Matatū. Cindy was a key leader and lineout specialist who helped the team become champions after defeating Chiefs Manawa 33–31 in the final. Cindy also lead the league tackling stats with 73 tackles.
