= Whitney Hansen =

- Born: 4 February 1987 (age 39) Christchurch, New Zealand

Rugby union career
- Position(s): Front row, Number 8
Amateur team(s)
Years	Team	Apps	(Points)
–2018	University of Canterbury		(0)
Provincial / State sides
Years	Team	Apps	(Points)
2011, 2013–14	Canterbury	14	(5)
Coaching career
- Years: Team
- 2017: Canterbury University (Head Coach)
- 2018: Canterbury U18 girls (Head Coach)
- 2019–2020: NZ Barbarians (women) (Head Coach)
- 2020–2023: Canterbury women (Asst. Coach)
- 2022: New Zealand (women) (Asst. Coach)
- 2022–2023: Matatū (Asst. Coach)
- 2024–2025: Matatū (Head of Rugby)
- 2024: Black Ferns XV (Head Coach)
- 2026–: New Zealand (women) (Head Coach)

Whitney Hansen (born 4 February 1987) is a New Zealand rugby union coach. She is the current Head Coach of the Black Ferns, New Zealand's women's national rugby union team.

== Rugby career ==
=== Playing ===
Hansen played provincially for Canterbury between 2011 and 2014, she appeared in 14 games for the side as a Front row and Number 8. She also played more than 100 games for the University of Canterbury, before making her final appearance for the team in 2018.

=== Coaching ===
Hansen's coaching career started in 2017 at the University of Canterbury. In 2018, she coached Canterbury's Under-18 girls’ representative team. In 2019, she was part of the coaching staff for the Black Ferns Development XV that competed at the Oceania Rugby Women's Championship in Fiji.

She then coached the New Zealand women's Barbarians in 2019 and 2020 in matches against the Black Ferns.

In 2022, she was the Black Ferns assistant coach to Wayne Smith during their successful campaign at the delayed 2021 Rugby World Cup that took place in New Zealand.

From 2020 to 2023, she was Canterbury’s assistant coach in the Farah Palmer Cup, the team won two titles in three years.

She was Matatū's assistant coach under Blair Baxter in 2022, and in 2023 when they won the Super Rugby Aupiki title. She then served as Matatū's Head coach from 2024 to 2025.

In 2023, she was appointed as the inaugural Head coach of the Black Ferns XV's side.

On 19 December 2025, Hansen was announced as the new Head coach of the Black Ferns, and is being appointed through to the end of 2027. She is the 13th Head coach of the Black Ferns, and only the second woman to hold the position after Vicky Dombroski in 1994. She is set to oversee 11 Tests in her first year followed by the historic British & Irish Lions tour scheduled for 2027.

== Personal life ==
She is the daughter of Steve Hansen, who was the All Blacks Head Coach between 2012 and 2019. Outside of rugby she works as a teacher.

Sporting positions
Preceded by Allan Bunting	Black Ferns coach 2026–	Incumbent
