= Aldora Itunu =

NZ international rugby union player

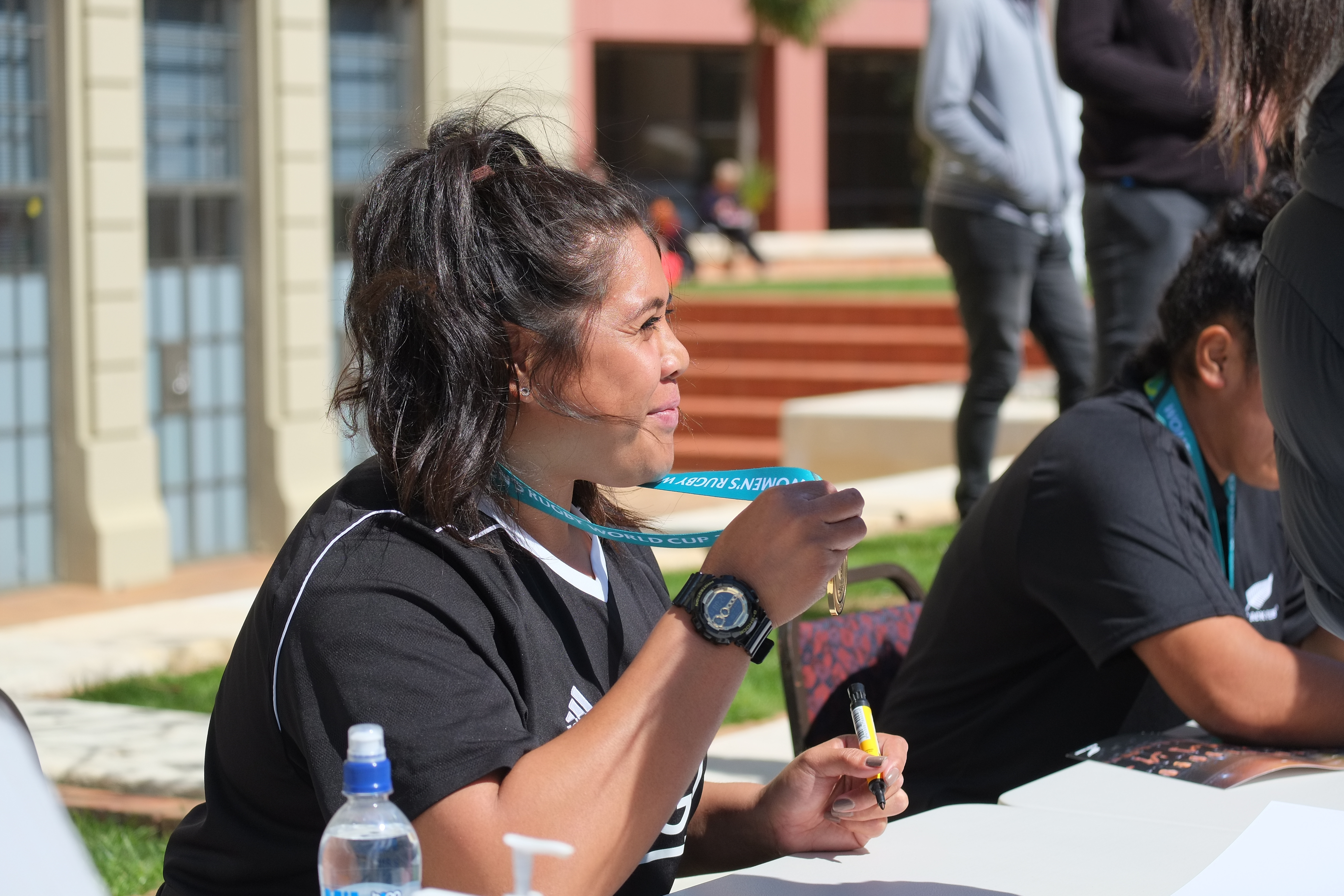
- Itunu signing autograph and holding up her WRWC medal in 2017
- Born: 28 June 1991 (age 35)
- Height: 1.78 m (5 ft 10 in)
- Weight: 110 kg (17 st 5 lb)
- Notable relative: Linda Itunu (sister)

Rugby union career
- Position: Prop
Provincial / State sides
Years	Team	Apps	(Points)
2012–Present	Auckland Storm	59	(70)
Super Rugby
Years	Team	Apps	(Points)
2021–Present	Blues Women	16	(20)
International career
Years	Team	Apps	(Points)
2015–2021	New Zealand	24	(30)
Medal record
Women's rugby union
Representing New Zealand
Women's Rugby World Cup
Gold medal – first place	2017 Ireland	Team competition

Aldora Itunu (born 28 June 1991) is a rugby union player from New Zealand. She was part of the Black Ferns team that won the 2017 Rugby World Cup in Ireland. She plays for the Blues Women in the Super Rugby Aupiki competition, and has made 50 appearances for the Auckland Storm in the Farah Palmer Cup.

== Early life ==
Itunu attended Rangeview Intermediate and Kelston Girls' College.

== Rugby career ==
Itunu made her debut for the Black Ferns in 2015 and was selected for the 2017 Women's Rugby World Cup squad. In the highest level of New Zealand domestic women's rugby competition, Itunu plays for the Auckland Storm as does her sister Linda Itunu. She spent a season playing in England and has also played in Italy.

In 2018, she was injured in the test against the Wallaroos at Eden Park, but was later cleared of any serious injury.

Itunu played for the Blues against the Chiefs in the first-ever women's Super Rugby match in New Zealand on 1 May 2021. On 3 November 2021, she was named in the Blues squad for the inaugural Super Rugby Aupiki competition.

Itunu was named in the Blues starting line up for their first game against Matatū, they won 21–10. She also started in their 0–35 thrashing by the Chiefs Manawa in the final round.

=== 2023 ===
Itunu made her 50th appearance for the Auckland Storm in the 2023 season of the Farah Palmer Cup. She took the 2023 Super Rugby Aupiki season off to become a mother, and will be returning to the Blues for the 2024 competition.
