= Cristo Taufua =

NZ international rugby union player

- Born: 11 December 1987 (age 38) Auckland, New Zealand
- Height: 1.69 m (5 ft 7 in)
- Weight: 105 kg (231 lb)

Rugby union career
- Position: Loose forward
Provincial / State sides
Years	Team	Apps	(Points)
2015, 2019–Present	Auckland	37	(25)
2017–2018	North Harbour	8	(0)
Super Rugby
Years	Team	Apps	(Points)
2021–2022	Blues Women	2	(0)
2023–2024	Hurricanes Poua	11	(0)
2025	Queensland Reds		(0)
International career
Years	Team	Apps	(Points)
2018–2020	New Zealand	2	(0)

Cristo Taufua (née Tofa; born 11 December 1987) is a New Zealand rugby union player. She has played two tests for the Black Ferns; she currently plays for Hurricanes Poua in the Super Rugby Aupiki competition, having previously played for the Blues Women.

== Rugby career ==
=== 2014–18 ===
Tofa took up rugby at the age of 26; four years later she was called into the Black Ferns squad and made her test debut against Australia in 2018. She played in both test matches against Australia.

=== 2020 ===
In 2020 she featured for the Probables against the Possibles in a Black Ferns trial match. She donned the Black Ferns jersey again and played against the New Zealand Barbarians at Waitakere.

=== 2021–22 ===
Tofa was selected for the Blues women's team in a historic match-up with the Chiefs in 2021. Later that year she was signed by the Blues for the inaugural season of Super Rugby Aupiki in 2022. She featured in their 0–35 thrashing by the Chiefs Manawa in the final round.

=== 2023 ===
Tofa moved to Hurricanes Poua for the 2023 Super Rugby Aupiki season.
