= Luka Connor =

New Zealand rugby player

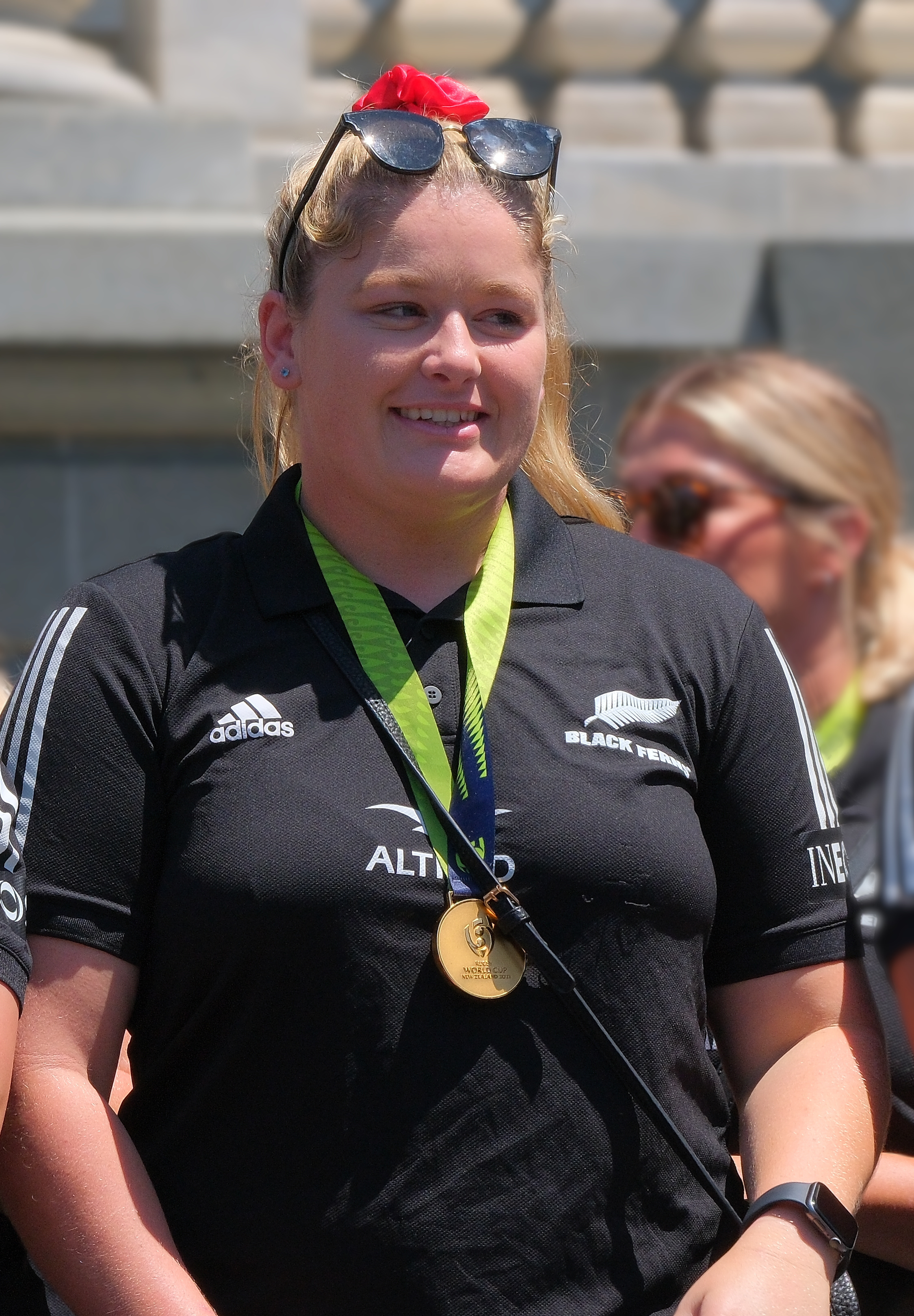
- Connor in 2022
- Born: 24 September 1996 (age 30) Ōpōtiki, New Zealand
- Height: 1.71 m (5 ft 7 in)
- Weight: 95 kg (14 st 13 lb)

Rugby union career
- Position: Hooker
Provincial / State sides
Years	Team	Apps	(Points)
2014–Present	Bay of Plenty Volcanix	50	(105)
Super Rugby
Years	Team	Apps	(Points)
2021–Present	Chiefs Manawa	15	(85)
International career
Years	Team	Apps	(Points)
2019–Present	New Zealand	24	(30)
Medal record
Representing New Zealand
Women's rugby union
Rugby World Cup
Gold medal – first place	2021 New Zealand	Team competition

Luka Connor (born 24 September 1996) is a New Zealand rugby union player. She was part of the Black Ferns 2021 Rugby World Cup squad that won their sixth title. She plays for Chiefs Manawa in the Super Rugby Aupiki competition; she also plays for the Bay of Plenty Volcanix in the Farah Palmer Cup and club rugby for Rangataua.

== Early life and career ==
Connor is from the Te Whakatōhea, Te Whānau-ā-Apanui and Ngāti Porou iwi. She was attending Ōpōtiki College when she made her debut for the Bay of Plenty Volcanix in 2014.

== Rugby career ==
In 2017, She suffered a serious knee injury and missed the entire provincial season of 2018.

Connor was one of 29 players who were offered Black Ferns contracts in 2019.

On 28 June 2019, she made her test debut for the Black Ferns, she came off the bench against Canada in San Diego. She was named in the Black Ferns squad for the 2019 Laurie O'Reilly Cup and featured in the second test match against Australia. She later featured for the New Zealand Development XV at the 2019 Oceania Women's Championship in Fiji.

In 2020 she appeared for the Black Ferns in two matches against the New Zealand Barbarians.

In 2021, she was named in the Chiefs squad for their historic match against the Blues at Eden Park in April. Later that year she was selected in the Chiefs Manawa team for the inaugural season of Super Rugby Aupiki.

Connor was selected for the Black Ferns squad for the 2022 Pacific Four Series. She made the team again for a two-test series against the Wallaroos for the Laurie O'Reilly Cup.

She made the Black Ferns 32-player squad to the deferred 2021 Rugby World Cup in New Zealand. She scored two tries against Wales in the quarterfinals.

Connor scored a hat-trick for Chiefs Manawa against Hurricanes Poua in the opening round of the 2023 Super Rugby Aupiki season. She crossed over for the first try from a lineout drive in her sides second round victory over the Blues Women. In round three, she scored her sides second try in their 46–38 win against Matatū in Hamilton.

In July 2023, she scored a try in the Black Ferns 21–52 victory over Canada at the Pacific Four Series in Ottawa.

She was named in the Black Ferns XVs squad for the trial match against the Black Ferns in Whangārei on 5 July 2025.
