= Renee Holmes =

NZ international rugby union player

- Born: 21 December 1999 (age 26) Gisborne, New Zealand
- Height: 1.68 m (5 ft 6 in)
- Weight: 70 kg (154 lb)
- School: Lytton High School; Gisborne Girls High School

Rugby union career
- Position(s): Fullback, Fly-half
Provincial / State sides
| Years | Team | Apps | (Points) |
| 2017 | Hawkes Bay | 5 | (5) |
| 2018 | Bay of Plenty | 4 | (4) |
| 2019–2023 | Waikato | 24 | (92) |
Super Rugby
| Years | Team | Apps | (Points) |
| 2021; 2024–2025 | Chiefs Manawa | 12 | (87) |
| 2022–2023 | Matatū | 8 | (59) |
| 2026 | Hurricanes Poua | | |
International career
| Years | Team | Apps | (Points) |
| 2020– | New Zealand | 30 | (199) |
Medal record
Women's rugby union
Representing New Zealand
Rugby World Cup
| Gold medal – first place | 2021 New Zealand | Team competition |
| Bronze medal – third place | 2025 England | Team competition |

Renee Holmes (born 21 December 1999) is a New Zealand rugby union player. She played for Matatū in the 2022 and 2023 seasons of the Super Rugby Aupiki competition and in 2024 for Chiefs Manawa. She plays provincial rugby for Waikato. She plays International rugby for the Black Ferns and was a member of their 2021 Rugby World Cup champion squad.

== Early career ==
Holmes has represented New Zealand at age-grade level in taekwondo, soccer and ultimate frisbee.

== Rugby career ==
Holmes made her Black Ferns debut on 21 November 2020 against the New Zealand Barbarians at Nelson. She made her international debut on 31 October 2021 against England at Exeter, it was the Black Ferns 100th test match.

After missing out on a contract with the Chiefs Manawa for the Super Rugby Aupiki's 2022 inaugural competition Holmes was approached by Crusaders chief executive Colin Mansbridge, and as a result she signed with Matatū for the season.

She was named in the Black Ferns squad for the 2022 Pacific Four Series. She scored her first international test try against the United States in the Pacific series. She was reselected for the team for the August test series against Australia for the Laurie O'Reilly Cup.

Holmes was selected for the Black Ferns 32-player squad for the delayed 2021 Rugby World Cup in New Zealand. She scored a brace of tries against a scoreless Scotland in New Zealand's final pool game. She also featured in the knockout stage of the tournament and played in the final against England. The Black Ferns were crowned champions for the sixth time.

She re-signed with Matatū for the 2023 Super Rugby Aupiki season. In the upset win of Matatū over Chiefs Manawa in the final of the 2023 season Holmes contributed 23 points in the form of two tries, two conversions and three penalties.

In July, she scored a try for the Black Ferns in their 21–52 victory over Canada at the 2023 Pacific Four Series in Ottawa.

Increased family commitments meant she was unwilling to spend long periods away from her home in Hamilton training in Christchurch if she re-signed with Matatū for the 2024 Super Rugby Aupiki season . She approached Chiefs Manawa coach Crystal Kaua about the possibly of a contract and was able to secure one, her signing being announced on 28 November 2023.

In July 2025, she was named in the Black Ferns squad to the Women's Rugby World Cup.

In the 2026 season Holmes switched to play for her third Super Rugby Aupiki team in four years when she signed with the Hurricanes Poua.
