= Black Ferns XV =

New Zealand national rugby union team

- Union: New Zealand Rugby
- Head coach: Willie Walker
- Captain: Holly Greenway

First international
- (New Zealand) Black Ferns XV 38–12 Manusina XV (23 September 2023)

Biggest win
- (New Zealand) Black Ferns XV 38–12 Manusina XV (23 September 2023)

Biggest defeat
- Black Ferns XV 12–45 New Zealand (5 July 2025)
- Website: allblacks.com

The Black Ferns XV is the second women's national rugby union team of New Zealand, after the Black Ferns. Matches played by the 'Black Ferns XV' are non-test matches, usually against a touring side or lower tier rugby nation.

== History ==
The Black Ferns XV were introduced to New Zealand Rugby’s high performance women's pathway in 2023. They played their first match against the Manusina XV at Navigation Homes Stadium in Pukekohe on 23 September 2023.

The side will be providing international rugby in a touring environment which will help accelerate the development of a wider group of players outside the Black Ferns and will build the depth of women's rugby in New Zealand.

In 2025, the side assembled on 29 June for a trial match against the Black Ferns in Whangarei on 5 July, and it was part of a double-header fixture at Semenoff Stadium that also featured the Māori All Blacks against Scotland. The trial match offered players another chance to "impress the Black Ferns coaches ahead of the Laurie O’Reilly Cup and the Rugby World Cup selection for a broader group of New Zealand's top professional players." The matches was also a boost for the Black Ferns in their Rugby World Cup preparations.

Willie Walker was announced as the Black Ferns XVs Head Coach for their 2025 campaign. They played the Black Ferns in Whangarei on 5 July, and later played two matches against South Africa. In their 2 match tour of South Africa, the Black Ferns XV split both games against the Springbok Womens with the Black Ferns XV winning the first match and the Springbok Womens winning the second match.

== Results ==
(All matches played, updated to 2 August 2025):

Opponent	Played	Won	Lost	Drawn	Win%	For	Aga	Diff
Manusina XV	1	1	0	0	100%	38	12	+26
New Zealand	1	0	1	0	0%	12	45	–33
South Africa	2	1	1	0	50%	58	67	+9
Summary	4	2	2	0	50%	108	124	–16

== Current squad ==
The Black Ferns XV announced their 28-player squad for two matches against the Springbok Women's team in Cape Town on 26 July and 2 August.

Players in bold are players capped by the senior New Zealand women's national team, the Black Ferns.

Head Coach: (New Zealand) Willie Walker

Player	Position	Club / province
**Luka Connor**	Hooker	Chiefs Manawa / Bay of Plenty
**Grace Leaso Gago**	Hooker	Blues / Counties Manukau
Jordan Tihore	Hooker	Bay of Plenty
**Marcelle Parkes**	Prop	Matatū / Canterbury
Cheyenne Tuli-Fale	Prop	Blues / Auckland
Maddi Robinson	Prop	Matatū / Canterbury
Mo'omo'oga Palu	Prop	Matatū / Canterbury
Harono Te Iringa	Prop	Blues / Counties Manukau
**Ma'ama Vaipulu**	Lock	Blues / Auckland
Sam Taylor	Lock	Hurricanes Poua / Manawatū
Holly Greenway (c)	Lock	Blues / Bay of Plenty
Taufa Bason	Loose forward	Blues / Manawatū
Elinor-Plum King	Loose forward	Hurricanes Poua / Manawatū
Fiaali'i Solomona	Loose forward	Matatū / Tasman
**Lucy Jenkins**	Loose forward	Matatū / Canterbury
Mia Anderson	Loose forward	Chiefs Manawa / Waikato
Tara Turner	Scrum-half	Blues / Northland
Reese Anderson	Scrum-half	Chiefs Manawa / Waikato
**Hannah King**	Fly-half	Matatū / Canterbury
Keira Su'a Smith	Fly-half	Hurricanes Poua / Wellington
Justine McGregor	Centre	Wellington
**Kelsey Teneti**	Centre	Waikato
Leilani Hakiwai	Center	Hurricanes Poua / Hawke's Bay
Winnie Palamo	Outside back	Matatū / Canterbury
Hollyrae Mete-Renata	Outside back	Matatū / Manawatū
Jaymie Kolose	Outside back	Blues / Counties Manukau
Kaea Nepia	Outside back	Matatū / Waikato
**Mererangi Paul**	Outside back	Chiefs Manawa / Counties Manukau

== See also ==
- New Zealand national schoolboy rugby union team
- New Zealand national under-19 rugby union team
- New Zealand national under-20 rugby union team
- New Zealand national under-21 rugby union team
- Maori All Blacks
- All Blacks XV
- All Blacks
- Black Ferns
