= Angel Mulu =

New Zealand rugby union player

- Born: 21 November 1999 (age 26)
- Height: 1.64 m (5 ft 5 in)
- Weight: 107 kg (236 lb)
- School: Tauranga Girls' College

Rugby union career
- Position: Prop
Amateur team(s)
Years	Team	Apps	(Points)
	Mount Maunganui		(0)
Provincial / State sides
Years	Team	Apps	(Points)
2018–2024	Bay of Plenty	25	(19)
2022	Wellington	7	(5)
Super Rugby
Years	Team	Apps	(Points)
2021–2023	Chiefs Manawa	6	(5)
2025	Hurricanes Poua	5	(0)
International career
Years	Team	Apps	(Points)
2022	New Zealand	2	(0)

Angel Mulu (born 21 November 1999) is a New Zealand rugby union player. She plays at Prop for the Black Ferns internationally and for Chiefs Manawa in the Super Rugby Aupiki competition.

== Biography ==
Mulu attended Tauranga Girls' College. She plays for the Bay of Plenty Volcanix and made her debut for them in 2018.

=== 2019 ===
In 2019 Mulu featured for Black Ferns Development team at the Oceania Rugby Women's Championship in Fiji.

=== 2022 ===
Mulu played for the Chiefs in the inaugural season of Super Rugby Aupiki. She made history when she scored the competitions first-ever try against Matatū.

Mulu was named in the Black Ferns squad for the 2022 Pacific Four Series. She made her international debut on 6 June against Australia at Tauranga at the Pacific Four Series.
