= Grace Steinmetz =

New Zealand rugby union player (born 1998)

- Born: 16 January 1998 (age 28) Paraparaumu
- Height: 1.68 m (5 ft 6 in)
- Weight: 71 kg (157 lb)

Rugby union career
- Position: Wing
Provincial / State sides
Years	Team	Apps	(Points)
2018–2023	Canterbury	25	(80)
Super Rugby
Years	Team	Apps	(Points)
2022–2023	Matatū	6	(10)
2024	Chiefs Manawa	7	(5)
International career
Years	Team	Apps	(Points)
2022–2024	New Zealand	3	(0)

Grace Steinmetz (born 16 January 1998) is a former New Zealand rugby union player. She made her test debut for the Black Ferns in 2022. She played for Chiefs Manawa in the Super Rugby Aupiki competition, she previously played for Matatū. She also represented Canterbury provincially.

== Personal life ==
Steinmetz was born in Paraparaumu. She participated in hockey, athletics and touch rugby before she moved into Sevens rugby. She is the niece of 2002 All Blacks second five Paul Steinmetz.

Steinmetz is a lawyer and studied Law and Commerce at the University of Canterbury.

== Rugby career ==
Steinmetz played sevens for Wellington and was in Japan on a sevens contract in 2020, but the COVID-19 pandemic forced her to return to New Zealand.

Steinmetz made her debut for Canterbury in 2018. She was selected for the Black Ferns Sevens training squad in 2019 and was part of Canterbury's fourth Farah Palmer Cup title win in 2020. In 2020, She came off the bench for the Probables against the Possibles in a Black Ferns trial match. She played for the Black Ferns against the New Zealand Barbarians on 21 November 2020 at Nelson.

Steinmetz signed with Matatū for the inaugural Super Rugby Aupiki season in 2022. She was initially named in the Black Ferns squad for the 2022 Pacific Four Series but was ruled out due to injury.

After missing out on the Pacific Four tournament, Steinmetz was recalled into the team for the August test series against Australia for the Laurie O'Reilly Cup. She made her test debut for the Black Ferns against Australia on 27 August 2022 in Adelaide.

On 28 November 2023, it was announced that she had signed with Chiefs Manawa for the 2024 Super Rugby Aupiki season.

On 4 October 2024 she announced her retirement due to a brain injury diagnosis.
