= Chyna Hohepa =

New Zealand rugby union and sevens player

- Born: 15 December 1989 (age 36)
- Height: 1.74 m (5 ft 9 in)
- Weight: 62 kg (137 lb)
- Notable relative: Carla Hohepa (sister)

Rugby union career
- Position: Lock
Provincial / State sides
Years	Team	Apps	(Points)
2012–Present	Waikato	41	(15)
Super Rugby
Years	Team	Apps	(Points)
2021–Present	Chiefs Manawa	15	(5)
National sevens team
Years	Team		Comps
2012–	New Zealand		

Chyna Hohepa (born 15 December 1989) is a New Zealand rugby union and sevens player. She plays Lock for the Chiefs Manawa in the Super Rugby Aupiki competition, and for Waikato provincially. She has also represented New Zealand in sevens and touch.

== Rugby career ==
Hohepa made her debut for Waikato in 2012. She was named in the Black Ferns sevens team for the Dubai Sevens, it was the first round of the inaugural 2012–13 Women's Sevens World Series.

In 2019, Hohepa captained the Waikato women's sevens squad. She has also represented New Zealand in touch.

On 1 May 2021, Hohepa represented Chiefs Manawa in their historic clash against the Blues women, it was the first-ever women's Super Rugby match in New Zealand. She later captained Waikato when they won their first Farah Palmer Cup Premiership title. At the 2021 Gallagher Waikato Rugby awards she was awarded the Waikato Supporters Club Farah Palmer Cup Player of the Year.

Hohepa joined Chiefs Manawa for the inaugural season of Super Rugby Aupiki in 2022. She was named in the side that faced Matatū in a pre-season match. She recommitted to Chiefs Manawa for the 2023 Super Rugby Aupiki season.

== Personal life ==
Hohepa's older sister, Carla, has also played for the Black Ferns sevens team, and the Black Ferns fifteens team.
