= Stephanie Te Ohaere-Fox =

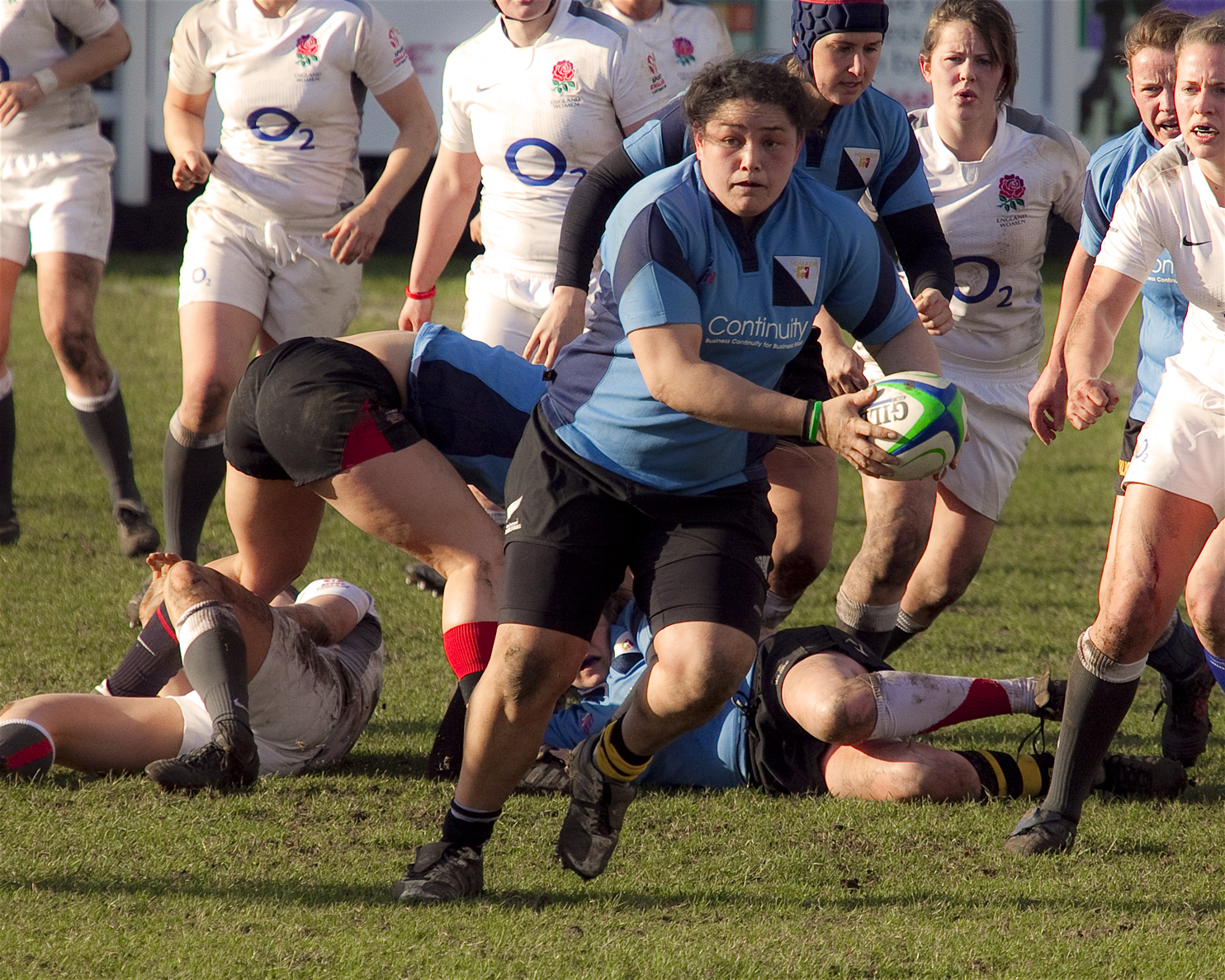
- Te Ohaere-Fox playing for Nomads against England A in 2011
- Born: 6 April 1985 (age 41)
- Height: 1.65 m (5 ft 5 in)
- Weight: 92 kg (203 lb; 14 st 7 lb)

Rugby union career
- Position: Prop
Provincial / State sides
Years	Team	Apps	(Points)
2007–2021	Canterbury	105	(95)
Super Rugby
Years	Team	Apps	(Points)
2022–2023	Matatū	7	(0)
International career
Years	Team	Apps	(Points)
2008–2014	New Zealand	24	(0)
Medal record
Women's rugby union
Representing New Zealand
Rugby World Cup
Gold medal – first place	2010 England	Team competition

Stephanie Te Ohaere-Fox (born 6 April 1985) is a New Zealand rugby union player. She competed for New Zealand at the 2010 and 2014 Rugby World Cup's. She played for Matatū in the Super Rugby Aupiki competition and provincially for Canterbury.

== Rugby career ==
=== 2004–08 ===
Te Ohaere-Fox debuted for Canterbury in 2004. Four years later she made her test debut against the Wallaroos on 14 October 2008 at Canberra.

=== 2010–14 ===
Te Ohaere-Fox was a member of the Black Ferns champion 2010 Rugby World Cup squad. After the World Cup she stayed back in England and played for the Wasps in the Women's Premiership from 2010 to 2011. In 2011, she was called back into the Black Ferns squad as injury cover on their English tour.

Te Ohaere-Fox was selected in the Black Ferns squad for the 2014 Rugby World Cup in France.

=== 2021 ===
Te Ohaere-Fox returned to Canterbury for the 2021 Farah Palmer Cup season after giving birth to her second child in 2020. She played her 100th game for Canterbury in 2021, becoming the first woman in the unions history to reach 100 Farah Palmer Cup matches.

Te Ohaere-Fox was one of the first of five players to be contracted to the newly formed Matatū rugby team to compete in the inaugural Super Rugby Aupiki season.
