= Georgia Cormick =

Australia international rugby union player

- Born: 12 October 1995 (age 31)
- Height: 1.57 m (5 ft 2 in)
- Weight: 56 kg (123 lb)

Rugby union career
- Position: Scrum-half
Provincial / State sides
| Years | Team | Apps | (Points) |
| 2022–2025 | Otago | 21 | (138) |
Super Rugby
| Years | Team | Apps | (Points) |
| 2018–2022 | Melbourne Rebels | | (0) |
| 2023–2025 | Matatū | 6 | (0) |
| 2025 | Western Force | | (0) |
International career
| Years | Team | Apps | (Points) |
| 2019– | Australia | 1 | (0) |

Georgia Cormick (born 12 October 1995) is an Australian rugby union player. She made her Wallaroos test debut in 2019. She plays for the Western Force in the Super Rugby Women's competition and previously played for the Melbourne Rebels, and for Matatū in the Super Rugby Aupiki competition.

== Early life and career ==
Cormick was born in Dunedin and moved to Melbourne with her parents as a baby. She began her rugby career when she was eight and played until she was 12, she was forced to stop playing because her local league didn't have a competition for girls.

== Rugby career ==
Cormick was impressive during the inaugural Super W season in 2018 and claimed the Rebels’ Women's Best Back award. She was completing her master's degree in osteopathy and training for rugby simultaneously.

In 2019, She made her international debut for the Wallaroos against Japan. Later that year she was set to make her starting debut against the Black Ferns in the first test of a double header with the Wallabies and All Blacks.

Cormick made her Super Rugby Aupiki debut for Matatū in the 2023 season. She also made her debut for Otago in the Farah Palmer Cup in 2022.

In 2025, she signed with the Western Force.
