= Kendra Reynolds =

New Zealand rugby union player

- Born: January 25, 1993 (age 33)
- Height: 1.63 m (5 ft 4 in)
- Weight: 77 kg (170 lb)

Rugby union career
- Position: Flanker
Provincial / State sides
Years	Team	Apps	(Points)
2013–2015	Waikato	14	(0)
2018–2024	Bay of Plenty	36	(19)
2024-	USRC Tigers RFC	32	(65)
Super Rugby
Years	Team	Apps	(Points)
2021	Chiefs Manawa	1	(5)
2022–2024	Matatū	13	(15)
International career
Years	Team	Apps	(Points)
2021–	New Zealand	12	(10)
Medal record
Representing New Zealand
Women's rugby union
Rugby World Cup
Gold medal – first place	2021 New Zealand	Team competition

Kendra Reynolds (born January 25, 1993) is a New Zealand rugby union player. She plays Flanker for New Zealand and was a member of their champion 2021 Rugby World Cup squad. She also played for Matatū in the Super Rugby Aupiki competition. Since 2024 she is playing for current Grand Champions USRC Tigers RFC in the Hong Kong Premiership.

== Rugby career ==
=== 2019–2021 ===
Reynolds played for the New Zealand Development XV at the 2019 Oceania Rugby Women's Championship in Fiji. She made her provincial debut for Waikato in 2012, before moving to Bay of Plenty in 2014 and playing for the Volcanix.

Reynolds made her test debut for the Black Ferns against France in 2021.

=== 2022 ===
Reynolds was named in the Matatū squad for the inaugural Super Rugby Aupiki season for 2022. She was announced as vice-captain along with Kendra Cocksedge.

Reynolds was named in the Black Ferns squad for the 2022 Pacific Four Series. She scored her first international try against the United States in the Pacific series. She was reselected for the squad for the August test series against the Wallaroos for the Laurie O'Reilly Cup.

Reynolds was selected for the Black Ferns 2021 Rugby World Cup 32-player squad.

=== 2023 ===
Reynolds was part of Matatū's team that won their first Super Rugby Aupiki title after defeating Chiefs Manawa in the final. On 17 April, she received a fulltime Black Ferns contract for the first time as New Zealand Rugby announced the 34-contracted-players for the year. In July, she featured in her sides 21–52 victory over Canada at the Pacific Four Series in Ottawa.

2024

Reynolds joined prestigious USRC Tigers RFC in the Hong Kong Premiership. In the 25/26 season she captained the side to win the Grand Championship Finals.
