= Natalie Delamere =

New Zealand rugby union player

- Born: 9 November 1996 (age 30) Murupara, New Zealand
- Height: 1.71 m (5 ft 7 in)
- Weight: 82 kg (181 lb)
- School: Rotorua Girls' High School

Rugby union career
- Position: Hooker
Senior career
| Years | Team | Apps | (Points) |
| 2025– | Mie Pearls | | |
Provincial / State sides
| Years | Team | Apps | (Points) |
| 2014, 2019–2023 | Bay of Plenty | 28 | (10) |
| 2016–2018 | Waikato | 20 | (20) |
Super Rugby
| Years | Team | Apps | (Points) |
| 2022–2023 | Matatū | 7 | (5) |
| 2022 | NSW Waratahs | 4 | (30) |
| 2025– | Hurricanes Poua | 4 | (0) |
International career
| Years | Team | Apps | (Points) |
| 2022 | New Zealand | 3 | (0) |
Medal record
Representing New Zealand
Women's rugby union
Rugby World Cup
| Gold medal – first place | 2021 New Zealand | Team competition |

Natalie Delamere (born 9 November 1996) is a New Zealand rugby union player. She was a member of the Black Ferns 2021 Rugby World Cup champion squad. She plays for Hurricanes Poua in the Super Rugby Aupiki competition, she previously played for Matatū.

== Rugby career ==
Delamere made her debut for the Bay of Plenty in the 2014 Farah Palmer Cup season, she was still in her last year at Rotorua Girls' High School. She also played for Waikato from 2016 to 2018.

She was named in the Matatū squad for the inaugural 2022 Super Rugby Aupiki season. She debuted for the NSW Waratahs in the 2022 Super W season against Fijiana Drua on 1 April. The NSW Waratahs met Fijiana Drua again in the Final where she scored a hat-trick.

Delamere was selected for the Black Ferns squad for the 2022 Pacific Four Series. She made her international test debut on 18 June 2022 against the United States at Whangārei. She was named in the team again for a two-test series against the Wallaroos for the Laurie O'Reilly Cup.

She was selected for the Black Ferns 2021 Rugby World Cup 32-player squad.

In 2023, she was named in the Black Ferns 30 player squad for the final O'Reilly Cup test. On 28 November, she was not named in Matatū's squad for the 2024 Aupiki season due to injury.
