= Linda Itunu =

NZ international rugby union player

- Born: 21 November 1984 (age 41)
- Height: 1.72 m (5 ft 8 in)
- Weight: 83 kg (13 st 1 lb)
- Notable relative: Aldora Itunu (sister)

Rugby union career
- Position: Flanker
Provincial / State sides
Years	Team	Apps	(Points)
- Auckland
International career
Years	Team	Apps	(Points)
2003–2018	New Zealand	39	(10)
National sevens team
Years	Team		Comps
2009–2014	New Zealand		
Medal record
Representing New Zealand
Women's rugby union
Rugby World Cup
Gold medal – first place	2006 Canada	Team competition
Gold medal – first place	2010 England	Team competition
Gold medal – first place	2017 Ireland	Team competition
Rugby World Cup Sevens
Silver medal – second place	2009 Dubai	Team competition
Gold medal – first place	2013 Moscow	Team competition

Linda Itunu (born 21 November 1984) is a New Zealand rugby union player. She plays for the Black Ferns, New Zealand women's sevens and Auckland.

Itunu attended Kelston Girls' College in Auckland. She was a member of three successful Rugby World Cup campaigns in 2006, 2010 and 2017. She was also part of the 2013 Rugby World Cup Sevens Squad that won gold. She had won silver at the previous Sevens World Cup in Dubai.

Itunu was named in the squad to the 2014 Rugby World Cup in France. In 2015 she was included in the Black Ferns squad alongside her sister Aldora Itunu to play in the 2015 Women's Rugby Super Series in Canada.

After Retiring in 2018 from international rugby Itunu captained the Barbarians Women's team in 2019 for matches in Denver, Colorado against USA and England Rose in London, England.
