= Krysten Cottrell =

New Zealand rugby player

- Born: 17 January 1992 (age 34)
- Height: 1.62 m (5 ft 4 in)
- Weight: 68 kg (150 lb)
- School: Taradale High School

Rugby union career
- Position: Utility Back
Provincial / State sides
Years	Team	Apps	(Points)
2007–2012, 2017–2024	Hawke's Bay	61	(332)
2013–2016	Manawatu	27	(120)
- Correct as of 19 June 2026
Super Rugby
Years	Team	Apps	(Points)
2022–2025	Blues Women	21	(127)
- Correct as of 19 June 2026
International career
Years	Team	Apps	(Points)
2018–2019	New Zealand	8	(0)
- Correct as of 19 June 2026

Krysten Cottrell (née Duffill, born 17 January 1992) is a New Zealand rugby union player. She made her international debut for New Zealand in 2018. She also plays for the Blues Women in the Super Rugby Aupiki competition and represents Hawke's Bay provincially.

== Rugby career ==
=== 2018 ===
In 2018, Cottrell was one of 28 Black Ferns who were offered contracts. She is a women's rugby development officer for Hawke's Bay Rugby Union.

Cottrell made her international debut for New Zealand off the bench against Australia on 18 August at Sydney. She was later selected for the Black Ferns November tour of 2018. She appeared in all three tests against the United States and France.

=== 2019 ===
Cottrell was named in New Zealand's squad for the Super Series in San Diego. She only featured in the match against Canada. She later played in both of the Black Ferns two-test match series against Australia in August.

=== 2021 ===
On 3 November, Cottrell was named in the Blues squad for the inaugural Super Rugby Aupiki competition. She was in the Blues starting line up for their first game, she converted a try against Matatū in their 21–10 victory. She also started in their 0–35 thrashing by the Chiefs Manawa in the final round.
