= Grace Gago =

- Born: 5 May 1998 (age 28) South Auckland, New Zealand
- Height: 168 cm (5 ft 6 in)

Rugby union career
- Position: Hooker
Provincial / State sides
Years	Team	Apps	(Points)
2017–2023	Counties Manukau	38	(45)
Super Rugby
Years	Team	Apps	(Points)
2023–2024	Blues Women	12	(25)
International career
Years	Team	Apps	(Points)
2023	New Zealand	1	(5)

Grace Gago (born 5 May 1998) is a New Zealand rugby union player. She plays for the Blues in the Super Rugby Aupiki competition and for Counties Manukau in the Farah Palmer Cup.

== Early career ==
Gago was attending Manurewa High School when she was named Counties Manukau Rugby's under-18 girls' Player of the Year at the Junior Rugby Awards that was held in Pukekohe in 2016. Besides playing for the Counties Manukau under-18s team, she also played for the Manurewa Wahine rugby league team and the Samoan under-18 tag team. She also represented her school in touch and was also part of their football and first XVs team.

== Rugby career ==
In 2022, At the Counties Manukau Rugby awards Gago won the Players’ Player of the Year, Forward of the Year, and MVP of the Year awards. She made her Super Rugby Aupiki debut for the Blues in 2023 in their first round loss to Matatū, despite scoring her sides first try, they narrowly lost 31–33.

Gago was named among 34 contracted players for the Black Ferns in 2023 as they build toward the 2025 Rugby World Cup, it is her first fulltime contract. She was named in the Black Ferns 30-player squad in June to compete in the Pacific Four Series and O’Reilly Cup. She started in her international debut against the United States on 14 July 2023, at Ottawa.

She was named in the Black Ferns XVs squad for the trial match against the Black Ferns in Whangārei on 5 July 2025.
