= Rhiarna Ferris =

NZ rugby union & league player

- Born: 27 June 1992 (age 34)
- Height: 1.77 m (5 ft 10 in)
- Weight: 70 kg (11 st 0 lb)

Rugby union career
Provincial / State sides
Years	Team	Apps	(Points)
2016–2023	Manawatū	33	(35)
Super Rugby
Years	Team	Apps	(Points)
2022–2024	Hurricanes Poua	13	(5)
National sevens team
Years	Team		Comps
2018	New Zealand 7s		3
- Rugby league career

Playing information
Representative
Years	Team	Pld	T	G	FG	P
2020	New Zealand Warriors					0

Rhiarna Ferris (born 27 June 1992) is a New Zealand rugby player. She played for the Black Ferns Sevens team internationally and competes for Hurricanes Poua in the Super Rugby Aupiki competition.

== Biography ==
Ferris attended Taradale High School for three years before going to Tū Toa in Palmerston North for her final two years. She played netball for the Central Zone and for Western Flyers.

Ferris made her international debut for the Black Ferns Sevens at the Fast Four tournament in Hamilton in 2019. She later made her official series debut at the Japan Sevens.

In 2020, She played for the New Zealand Warriors in the NRL Nines in Perth. In 2022, she was named in the Hurricanes Poua team to face the Chiefs Manawa in their first official Super Rugby Aupiki match.
