= Kelsie Thwaites =

New Zealand beach volleyball player (born 1993)

- Born: 8 January 1993 (age 33)
- Height: 1.84 m (6 ft 0 in)
- Weight: 81 kg (179 lb)

Rugby union career
- Position: Lock
Provincial / State sides
Years	Team	Apps	(Points)
2019–Present	Bay of Plenty	28	(10)
Super Rugby
Years	Team	Apps	(Points)
2021–2023	Chiefs Manawa	6	(0)
International career
Years	Team	Apps	(Points)
2020–Present	New Zealand	2	(0)
Medal record
Women's beach volleyball
Representing New Zealand
FIVB Beach Volleyball World Tour
Bronze medal – third place	2017	Ulsan Open

Kelsie Thwaites (née Wills; born 8 January 1993) is a New Zealand rugby union player. She previously represented New Zealand in beach volleyball before switching to rugby.

== Volleyball career ==
Thwaites completed an indoor volleyball scholarship in the United States, and played professionally in Paris.

Thwaites and playing partner Shaunna Polley represented New Zealand at the 2018 Commonwealth Games. They were the nation's first women's beach volleyball team to compete at the Games. The pair won a bronze medal at the Ulsan Open in South Korea on the 2017 FIVB Beach Volleyball World Tour.

== Rugby career ==
Thwaites made a switch to rugby union in 2019. She made the Bay of Plenty Volcanix squad in her debut year for the Farah Palmer Cup. She wore the black jersey for the first time in two non-test matches against the NZ Barbarians in 2020. She made her international debut for the Black Ferns against England on 31 October 2021 at Exeter.

Thwaites was named in the Chiefs Manawa squad for the 2023 Super Rugby Aupiki season.
