= Kelston Girls' College =

Kelston Girls’ College
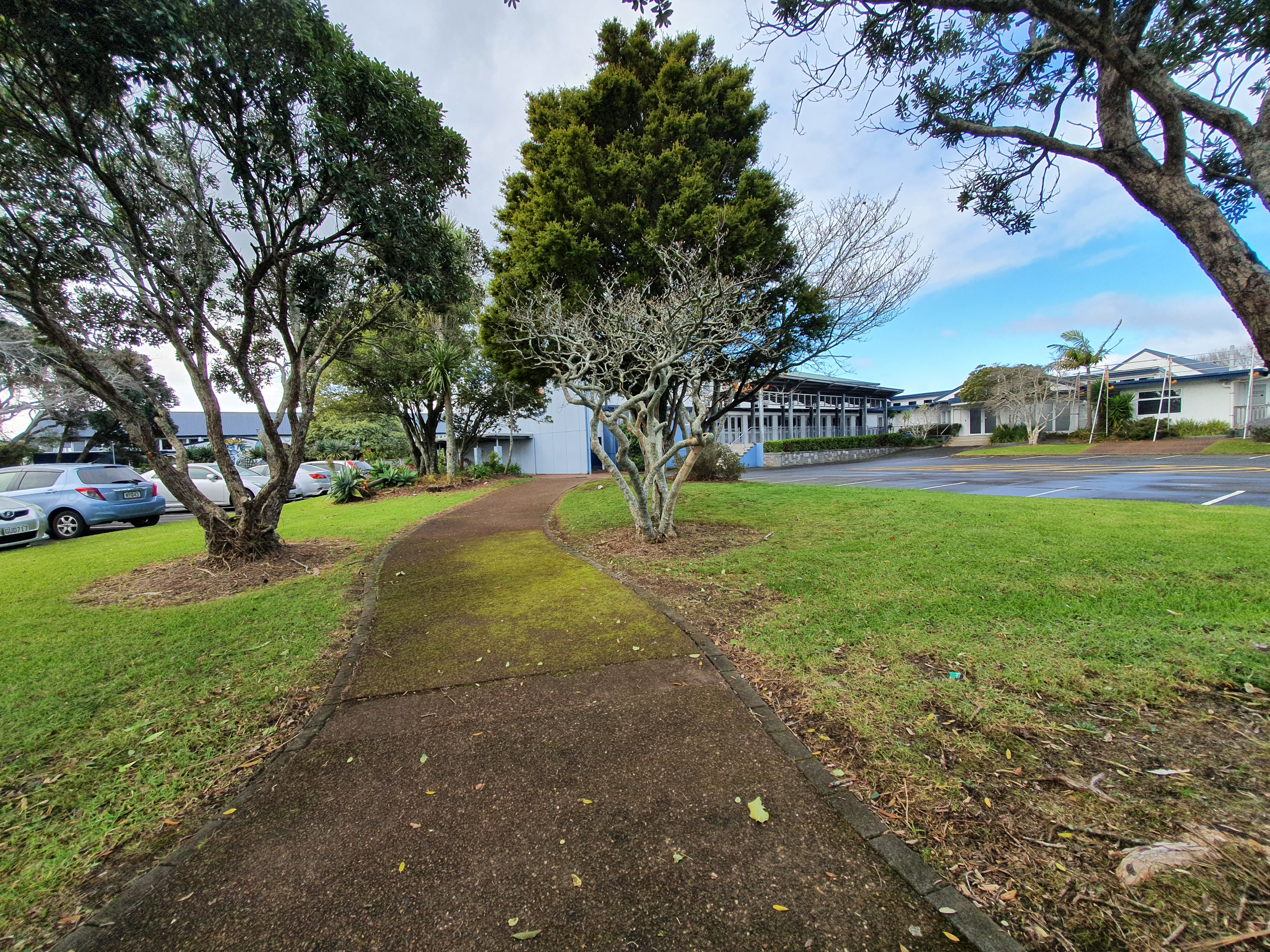

Location
- Achibald Rd, Kelston, Auckland; New Zealand; 36.90676°S 174.66374°E

Information
- Type: State single-sex girls secondary (Year 9–13)
- Motto: To wisdom with honour
- Ministry of Education Institution no.: 84
- Principal: Talia McNaughton
- Enrolment: 594 (July 2026)

Kelston Girls’ College (KGC) is a single-sex girls state secondary school in Kelston, a suburb in West Auckland, New Zealand. It was created in 1963 when the roll of Kelston High School (formed in 1954) became too large for the site on the corner of Archibald and Great North Roads. The boys moved to a new site further down Archibald Road and the original site became the home of Kelston Girls' High School (now Kelston Girls' College).

== History ==
In 1888, New Lynn School, one of the first schools in West Auckland, was opened on the current site of Kelston Girls' College. In 1914, the school was relocated to its modern-day site on Hutchinson Avenue. In 1954 the Kelston High School, a co-educational school, was opened at the site of the old New Lynn School. It was the third high school to open in West Auckland, after Avondale College in 1945, and Henderson High School a year beforehand. Kelston High School was separated into two schools in 1963, with Kelston Girls' High School remaining at the site and Kelston Boys' High School moving to a new campus to the north. In 1993, a marae was established on the school grounds.

In 2004 Kelston Girls' High School Board of Trustees decided to undergo a change of name. Following consultation with the community, the school was renamed Kelston Girls' College. At the time Board chairwoman Rosemary Caldwell commented that the name change would help to attract international students.

== Enrolment ==
As of July 2026, Kelston Girls' College has a roll of 594 students, of which 94 (15.8%) identify as Māori.

As of 2026, the school has an Equity Index of 507, placing it amongst schools whose students have many socioeconomic barriers to achievement (roughly equivalent to deciles 2 and 3 under the former socio-economic decile system).

== Curriculum ==
Kelston Girls' College is a Te Kotahitanga school. Te Kotahitanga is an education style aimed at raising Māori student achievement. It prescribes that the student is at the centre of learning in the classroom and that culturally responsive relational trust is the focus of all teachers.

== Hauora centre ==
Kelston Girls' College has an onsite Hauora centre. Students have access to a doctor, registered nurse, physiotherapist, guidance counsellors, youth work, social worker and family planning services. The purpose-built centre aims to support students' physical, emotional and mental health.

== Notable alumnae ==
=== Sportswomen ===
- Monalisa Codling – rugby union player
- Aldora Itunu – rugby union player
- Linda Itunu – rugby union player
- Brenda Matthews – sprinter and hurdler
- Leilani Tominiko – professional wrestler
- Beverly Weigel – long jumper and sprinter

=== Other ===
- Debra Mortimer – lawyer and judge

== Notable staff ==
- Haidee Tiffen – cricket, White Ferns
