= Grace Houpapa-Barrett =

- Born: 25 July 1995 (age 31)
- Height: 1.67 m (5 ft 6 in)
- Weight: 98 kg (216 lb)

Rugby union career
- Position: Hooker
Provincial / State sides
Years	Team	Apps	(Points)
2014–Present	Waikato	52	(120)
Super Rugby
Years	Team	Apps	(Points)
2021–Present	Chiefs Manawa	12	(15)
International career
Years	Team	Apps	(Points)
2021–	New Zealand	3	(0)

Grace Houpapa-Barrett (born 25 July 1995) is a New Zealand rugby union player. She plays for the Black Ferns internationally and for Chiefs Manawa in the Super Rugby Aupiki competition. She also represents Waikato provincially in the Farah Palmer Cup.

== Rugby career ==
=== 2014 & 2020 ===
Houpapa-Barrett made her provincial debut for Waikato in 2014. She played for the New Zealand Barbarians and the Possibles in 2020.

=== 2021–2022 ===
Houpapa-Barrett played in the inaugural women's Super Rugby match for the Chiefs in 2021.

Houpapa-Barrett was named in the Black Ferns squad for their end of year tour of France and England in 2021. She made her international debut for New Zealand on 31 October against England at Exeter. She later started in the second test against England. She only played in the first of two Tests against France in Pau.

Chiefs Manawa signed Houpapa-Barrett for their inaugural season of Super Rugby Aupiki.
