= Olive Watherston =

New Zealand rugby sevens player

- Born: 17 May 2004 (age 22)
- School: Arrowtown School; Wakatipu High School

Rugby union career
Amateur team(s)
Years	Team	Apps	(Points)
2021-	Otago Spirit		
Provincial / State sides
Years	Team	Apps	(Points)
2024-	Chiefs Manawa		
National sevens team
Years	Team		Comps
2024-	New Zealand		

Olive Watherston (born 17 May 2004) is a New Zealand rugby union player who plays for the New Zealand women's national rugby sevens team.

== Career ==
Watherston was born to Spik and Fiona Watherston, and is the youngest of four daughters. She grew up on a farm near Arrowtown in the Otago region of New Zealand.

While attending Arrowtown School she was a member of their team that won the Otago touch rugby title in 2014. Later, she attended Wakatipu High School and took up playing tackle rugby union in 2019 as a teenager and was called-up to represent Otago at under-18 level.

In 2021, Watherston was named in the Otago Spirit team for her debut against Bay of Plenty Volcanix in Mount Maunganui as a 17-year-old.

Watherston was first named for the Black Ferns Sevens development side in December 2023. She was contracted to the Chiefs Manawa 15s squad, but didn’t play in the Super Rugby Aupiki competition due to injury but did play for an invitational team in the Hong Kong 10s, in April 2024, and given a Black Ferns development contract, played in two international tournaments in France in June of that year.

Watherston was called up to the senior New Zealand women's national rugby sevens team in November 2024. She made her debut during the 2024-25 SVNS.

Following the end of the international sevens season Watherston spent from June to September 2025 playing along with Sarah Hirini for the Mie Pearls in Japan's Taiyo Seimei Women’s 7s Series.

She was named in the New Zealand squad for the 2025-26 SVNS series in November 2025.
