= Jaymie Kolose =

NZ international rugby sevens player

- Born: 6 July 2001 (age 25)

Rugby union career
- Position: Winger
Provincial / State sides
Years	Team	Apps	(Points)
2022–	Counties Manukau	24	(75)
Super Rugby
Years	Team	Apps	(Points)
2023–	Blues	26	(110)
International career
Years	Team	Apps	(Points)
2025	Black Ferns XV	2	(5)
National sevens team
Years	Team		Comps
2025–	New Zealand 7s		

Jaymie Kolose (born 6 July 2001) is a New Zealand rugby union player who plays as a winger for Blues Women and the New Zealand women's national rugby sevens team.

== Career ==
Kolose played for Counties Manukau. Having scored five tries in her debut season in 2023, she was also part of the Blues Women side that won the 2025 Super Rugby Aupiki, playing in 20 of the Blues' 23 games, scoring a dozen tries. In July 2025, she was called-up to train with the senior New Zealand women's national rugby union team.

After making her debut for the New Zealand Sevens in 2025, she was part of winning teams at the 2026 Singapore Sevens and 2026 Australia Sevens in the 2025-26 SVNS series. On 8 March 2026, she was a try scorer in the final of the 2026 Canada Sevens as New Zealand defeated Australia 24-17.
