= Crystal Kaua =

New Zealand rugby union coach and player

- Born: 1984 or 1985 (age 41–42)

Rugby union career
- Position(s): Loose forward, lock
Provincial / State sides
Years	Team	Apps	(Points)
2012–2013	Waikato	12	(0)
2009	Auckland	7	(0)
National sevens team
Years	Team		Comps
- Aotearoa Māori Sevens
Coaching career
- Years: Team
- 2013–2015: Hamilton Girls' High School 7s
- 2018–2022: Mie Pearls 7s Mie Pearls XVs
- 2022: Chiefs Manawa (assistant coach)
- 2023–2024: Chiefs Manawa (head coach)

Crystal Kaua (born 1984 or 1985) is a New Zealand rugby union coach and former player.

== Playing career ==
Kaua made the Black Ferns sevens and fifteens trial squads, and also played for the Aotearoa Sevens Māori side. She represented Auckland and Waikato in the Farah Palmer Cup.

== Coaching career ==
In 2011, Kaua and two of her New Zealand Māori Sevens teammates and Black Ferns, Victoria Grant and Teresa Te Tamaki, helped the University of Waikato Rugby Club make a comeback.

Kaua and her husband, Brent, led Hamilton Girls' High School to three consecutive Condor Sevens national titles, and also world youth titles in Hawaii and Japan up to the end of 2015. They then moved to Japan in 2018 and coached there for about four years. They coached the Mie Pearls sevens and fifteens teams in Yokkaichi.

=== 2022 ===
Kaua was an assistant coach to Allan Bunting in Chiefs Manawa during their inaugural Super Rugby Aupiki season when they won their maiden title. She was also the Black Ferns Sevens performance analyst and skills coach in 2022. She was the technical advisor for the Bay of Plenty Volcanix in the 2022 Farah Palmer Cup.

Kaua headed the Rawata team during the Black Ferns trial in July ahead of the delayed 2021 Rugby World Cup. In September, she was appointed as the new head coach of Chiefs Manawa for the 2023 season.
