= Sophie Fisher =

New Zealand rugby union player

- Born: 25 November 1998 (age 27)
- Height: 1.78 m (5 ft 10 in)

Rugby union career
- Position: Prop
Provincial / State sides
Years	Team	Apps	(Points)
2017–2020	North Harbour	22	(94)
2021–2023	Auckland	20	(21)
- Correct as of 19 June 2026
Super Rugby
Years	Team	Apps	(Points)
2022–2024	Blues Women	9	(5)
- Correct as of 19 June 2026
International career
Years	Team	Apps	(Points)
2023	New Zealand	2	(0)
- Correct as of 19 June 2026

Sophie Fisher (born 25 November 1998) is a New Zealand rugby union player. She most recently played for the Blues Women in the Super Rugby Aupiki competition and represented Auckland provincially.

== Rugby career ==
Fisher played hockey before switching to rugby in Year 13 at Kaipara College. Between 2017 and 2020, she played 22 games for North Harbour as a Lock. She then moved to Auckland in 2021 where she switched to Loosehead Prop, she is also a goal-kicker for the side.

Fisher was a late call-up to the Blues Women's Super Rugby Aupiki squad in 2022. After a strong Farah Palmer Cup season for the Auckland Storm in 2022, she became a regular player for the Blues team. She made her Super Rugby debut in 2023.

Fisher was part of the Auckland Storm squad that won the 2023 Farah Palmer Cup Premiership title. In September, she was named in the Black Ferns 30 player squad for their final O'Reilly Cup test and for the inaugural WXV1 tournament.
