= Blair Baxter =

New Zealand rugby union coach

- Born: 27 February 1980 (age 46)

Rugby union career
- Position: Flanker
Provincial / State sides
Years	Team	Apps	(Points)
2004–2005	Marlborough	14	(0)
Coaching career
- Years: Team
- 2020–2023: Canterbury
- 2022–2023: Matatū
- 2023–: China women's 7s (Assistant Coach)

Blair Baxter (born 27 February 1980) is a New Zealand rugby union coach. He currently is an assistant coach with the China women's sevens team. He was previously the head coach of Matatū in the Super Rugby Aupiki competition, and Canterbury in the Farah Palmer Cup competition.

== Coaching career ==
In 2019, Baxter was the assistant coach of Canterbury's under-19 team when they won the Jock Hobbs Memorial National Tournament. He was appointed as Canterbury's head coach in 2020 and helped guide them to win the Farah Palmer Cup that year.

Baxter was appointed the head coach of the South Island women's team, Matatū, that competed in the inaugural Super Rugby Aupiki competition in 2022. He concluded his tenure with Matatū on a high note after winning the 2023 Super Rugby Aupiki season.

In 2023, He had an eight-month coaching stint as an assistant coach with the China women's sevens team which ended on November 30. He later accepted the role as Assistant Coach of the China women's 7's side, in their quest for qualification for the 2024 Summer Olympics.
