= Willie Walker (rugby union) =

NZ rugby union player

William Walker
- Born: William Charles Aroyn Walker; 19 May 1978 (age 48) Ōpōtiki, New Zealand
- Height: 1.83 m (6 ft 0 in)
- Weight: 88 kg (194 lb)
- School: Ōpōtiki College; King's College

Rugby union career
- Position(s): First five-eighth Fullback
Senior career
Years	Team	Apps	(Points)
2004	Gran Ducato Parma		(0)
2004–2006	World Fighting Bull		(0)
2006–2009	Gloucester	46	(297)
2009–2011	Worcester Warriors	30	(261)
Provincial / State sides
Years	Team	Apps	(Points)
1997–2001, 2011	North Harbour	41	(126)
2000	Marlborough	1	(0)
2002–2003	Otago	15	(135)
2015	Counties Manukau	4	(8)
- Correct as of 19 September 2015
Super Rugby
Years	Team	Apps	(Points)
2002–2003	Highlanders	22	(203)
- Correct as of 19 September 2015
International career
Years	Team	Apps	(Points)
2002–2003	New Zealand Māori	7	(26)
Coaching career
- Years: Team
- 2021–2023: Auckland Storm
- 2021–2026: Blues Women
- 2025: Black Ferns XV
- 2026–: Fijiana XV

William Charles Aroyn Walker (born 19 May 1978) is a former New Zealand rugby union footballer. He played for Gloucester and Worcester Warriors in the Guinness Premiership. He has also played for the New Zealand Maori.

Walker is currently the head coach of the Fiji women's national rugby union team

He had previously coached the Blues Women in the Super Rugby Aupiki competition.

== Rugby career ==
Walker debuted for North Harbour in 1997. He later played for Otago in 2002 and 2003. He also played for the Highlanders from 2002 to 2003 before going abroad.

Walker joined Gloucester for the start of the 2006/07 season on a 2-year contract from World Fighting Bull. He made 24 appearances in all competitions during his debut season, scoring 220 points. This included 2 tries against Bath & Bristol. In his second season, he made 23 appearances in all competitions, scoring 96 points. He scored 2 tries against Leicester Tigers and Bourgoin. On 22 May 2008, Walker signed a 2-year extension to his contract.

On 13 September 2008, Walker played a key role in Gloucester's victory at The Rec. He scored 1 try, 1 conversion, 2 penalties & 1 drop-goal to help Gloucester to a 21–17 victory.

On 16 May 2009, having played Nine games and scored 74 points whilst on loan to Worcester Warriors from Gloucester, it was officially announced that Walker had signed a 2-year deal with the Warriors, after being released from his contract by the Cherry & Whites. This new deal would keep Walker at the Worcester Warriors until 2011.

During his loan spell with Worcester Warriors Walker helped the Warriors achieve a huge derby double over local rivals Gloucester by kicking Worcester to victory both at Sixways and Kingsholm.

== Coaching career ==
Walker was appointed as Head Coach of Auckland Storm for the 2021 Farah Palmer Cup season. He then coached the Blues Women in the first-ever women's Super Rugby match in New Zealand on 1 May 2021.

With the announcement of the creation of the Super Rugby Aupiki competition by New Zealand Rugby, Walker was offered the position of Head Coach of the Blues Women for the inaugural season in 2022.
