= Blues Women =

NZ rugby union team, based in Auckland

- Union: New Zealand Rugby
- Founded: 2021; 5 years ago
- Location: Auckland, New Zealand
- Region: Auckland; Counties Manukau; Northland
- Coach: Vacant
- Captain: Maia Roos
- Most appearances: Maia Roos (31)
- Top scorer: Krysten Cottrell (125)
- Most tries: Katelyn Vaha'akolo (21)
- League: Super Rugby Aupiki
- 2026: Champions (3rd title)
Team kit

Official website
- www.blues.rugby

The Blues Women (known as the nib Blues Women for sponsorship reasons) is a New Zealand professional women's rugby union team based in Auckland, New Zealand that competes in the Super Rugby Aupiki competition. They played against a Chiefs women's side in the first-ever women's Super Rugby match in New Zealand in 2021. They won their first Super Rugby Aupiki title in 2024 and won it back-to-back the next season. The Blues also defeated the NSW Waratahs to claim the inaugural Super Rugby Women's Championship final in 2025.

== History ==
=== Historic clash ===
On 1 May 2021, the Blues and Chiefs women's teams created history when they played in the first-ever women's Super Rugby match in New Zealand. The Blues hosted the Chiefs women at Eden Park in a double header before the Super Rugby Aotearoa round 10 match between their men's teams. It was to be a one-off match in 2021, but both franchises expressed their commitment to developing a Super Rugby team for women in the future.

The teams played for the 'Waipuea Women's Rugby Taonga' trophy. The name was derived from the words Wai (for Waikato, Waitemata water, river and sea) and Puea (for winds that carry korero – a conversation or meeting – over land, mountains and sea). Eloise Blackwell, who was named the Blues captain for the historic match, unveiled the trophy with Blues captain Patrick Tuipulotu on the Sky Tower.

Willie Walker was appointed to coach the Blues Women's team and named the match day squad on 29 April 2021. The Blues women lost the historic match 12–39.

=== Super Rugby Aupiki announced ===
New Zealand Rugby announced on 6 October 2021, that an elite women's competition called Super Rugby Aupiki was confirmed for March 2022. The competition would run for four weeks and the women would be paid for their participation.

=== Inaugural season ===
The Blues women released a list of player signings along with the other three teams in November 2021. Willie Walker was named as Head Coach, and his assistant coaches were Mel Bosman and James Semple.

The Blues Women's opening match was cancelled due to Hurricanes Poua forced withdrawal due to COVID cases and isolation requirements within their squad. The Blues and Hurricanes Poua shared the competition points with the match being called a draw. The Blues finally made their long-awaited Super Rugby Aupiki debut against Matatū, they ran in three tries in their 21–10 victory. The Blues final match was against the Chiefs Manawa, the two sides having last met in the historic clash the year before. The Blues were left scoreless as the Chiefs showed their dominance in the 35–0 outcome.

=== 2024 onwards ===
Blues Women made a come back from an 18–5 deficit to claim their first Aupiki title at Eden Park. They scored three tries within fifteen minutes to edge Chiefs Manawa 24–18 with Black Fern, Liana Mikaele-Tu'u, scoring the winning try. On 20 November 2024, it was announced that the 2025 Super Rugby Aupiki winners would play the champions of the Australian Super Rugby Women's competition at the end of their respective seasons. The new competition, which is setup similarly to a super cup, is called the Super Rugby Champions Final.

The Blues successfully defended their title against Matatū and won their second consecutive championship. On 17 April 2025, the Blues defeated the NSW Waratahs to claim the first-ever Super Rugby Women's Championship final in Auckland.

The Blues ahead of the 2026 Super Rugby Aupiki season are affiliated with the regions of Northland, Auckland and Counties Manukau.

== Overall record ==
Blues Women Super Rugby Aupiki matches
Coach	Period	G	W	L	D	P%
Matatū	2022-	11	7	4	0	64%
Chiefs Manawa	2022-	9	6	3	0	66%
Hurricanes Poua	2022-	8	6	2	0	75%
(2022-present)*		29	19	10	0	66%
Updated to: 29 July 2026

Notes:

^* Official Super Rugby Aupiki competition matches only, including finals.

=== Season standings ===
A summary of Blues (Women) results in the regular season is shown below:

Season	Pos	Pld	W	L	D	F	A	+/-	BP	Pts	Notes
2022	3rd	3	1	1	1	21	45	-24	0	6	Finished 3rd overall
2023	3rd	3	1	0	2	95	105	-10	1	5	Finished 3rd overall
2024	1st	6	5	0	1	194	111	+83	3	23	Defeated Chiefs Manawa in the final
2025	1st	6	5	0	1	216	123	+93	4	24	Defeated Matatū in the final
2026	2nd	6	4	2	0	200	160	+40	2	18	Defeated Matatū in the final

== Current squad ==
The Blues Women squad for the 2026 Super Rugby Aupiki season is:

2026 Blues Women squad
**Props**: (Samoa) **Glory Aiono** (Note: Aiono wasn't named in the original Blues Women squad, but was announced in the side for Round 2.); (New Zealand) **Aldora Itunu**; (Japan) **Nijiho Nagata**; (New Zealand) Cilia-Marie Po'e-Tofaeono; (New Zealand) Harono Te Iringa; (New Zealand) Cheyenne Tuli-Fale; (New Zealand) **Chryss Viliko**; **Hookers**: (New Zealand) Danny-Elle Alefosio Fesolai; (New Zealand) **Grace Gago**; (New Zealand) **Atlanta Lolohea**; **Locks**: (New Zealand) **Eloise Blackwell**; (New Zealand) **Maia Roos** **(c)**; (New Zealand) **Ma'ama Mo'onia Vaipulu**	**Loose forwards**: (New Zealand) Taufa Bason; (New Zealand) Dajian Brown; (New Zealand) Zara Feaunati; (New Zealand) **Tafito Lafaele**; (New Zealand) **Liana Mikaele-Tu'u**; (New Zealand) Amarante Sititi; **Halfbacks (scrum-halves)**: (New Zealand) Ffion Penney; (New Zealand) Aleiyah Tuala ^{ST} (Note: Tuala joined the team as temporary cover for the NZ women's sevens players in the squad.); (New Zealand) **Tara Turner**; **First five-eighths (fly-halves)**: (New Zealand) **Ruahei Demant**; (New Zealand) Ella Henderson; (New Zealand) **Hazel Tubic** ^{ST} (Note: Tubic joined the team as temporary cover for the NZ women's sevens players in the squad.)	**Midfielders (centres)**: (New Zealand) **Sylvia Brunt**; (New Zealand) Hollyrae Mete; **Outside backs**: (New Zealand) Jaymie Kolose; (New Zealand) Mele Latu'ila ^{ST} (Note: Latu'ila joined the team as temporary cover for the NZ women's sevens players in the squad.); (New Zealand) Danii Mafoe; (New Zealand) Sariyah Paitai; (New Zealand) **Mererangi Paul**; (New Zealand) **Braxton Sorensen-McGee**; (New Zealand) **Katelyn Vaha'akolo**
**(c)** denotes the team captain. **Bold** denotes internationally capped players.^{ST} denotes a short-term signing. Source:

== Current coaches and management ==
Blues named their coaching group for the 2026 season of Super Rugby Aupiki.

- Head Coach: Willie Walker
- Forwards Coach: Charmaine McMenamin
- Backs Coach: Carlos Spencer
- Scrum Coach: Census Johnston

== Captain ==
Captain	Period	Refs
Eloise Blackwell	2021	
Aroha Savage	2022	
Ruahei Demant	2023	
Ruahei Demant	2024	
Maia Roos	2024	
Maia Roos	2025–	

== Coach ==
Blues Women coaches by date, matches and win percentage*
Coach	Period	G	W	D	L	%
Willie Walker	2022–2026	31	21	1	9	69.35%
TBD	2027–	0	0	0	0	0.00%
Totals (2022–present)^{*}		31	21	1	9	69.35%
Updated to: 16 August 2026

Notes:

^* Official Super Rugby Aupiki competition matches and finals, including the Super Rugby Champions Final.
