= Matatū =

NZ women's rugby union team, based in Christchurch

- Union: New Zealand Rugby
- Founded: 2021; 5 years ago
- Location: Christchurch, New Zealand
- Region: Tasman; Canterbury; Otago
- Coach: Blair Baxter
- Captain: Grace Brooker
- Most appearances: Amy du Plessis (27)
- Top scorer: Hannah King (93)
- Most tries: Kaipo Olsen-Baker (13)
- League: Super Rugby Aupiki
- 2026: Runners-up

Official website
- www.matatu.co.nz

Matatū is a New Zealand women's professional rugby union team that competes in the Super Rugby Aupiki competition. Matatū represents the South Island, specifically the regions covered by the Crusaders and the Highlanders. They were crowned the champions of the 2023 Super Rugby Aupiki season.

== History ==
=== Name, logo and colours ===
The team's name, logo and colours were officially unveiled on 12 October 2021. The name, logo and colours were created by a local artist and designer Morgan Mathews-Hale in partnership with Te Whaka Ako Limited. Matatū is a name gifted by Ngāi Tūāhuriri, which is one of five primary hapū of the Ngai Tahu iwi.

The name Matatū, literally meaning "alert or vigilant", has been gifted to symbolise the teams tūmanawa (determined sacrifice), tūaho (legacy), tūhono (connections) and tūtira (unity) in representing Te Waka o Aoraki (the South Island).

=== 2022 ===
Matatū played their first game against the Chiefs Manawa in a pre-season match ahead of the inaugural Super Rugby Aupiki season at the Owen Delany Park in Taupō. Liv McGoverne kicked the teams first-ever points and Julia Gorinski scored their first try. The Chiefs Manawa won the match 28–20. Matatū and the Chiefs Manawa met five days later to play the inaugural Super Rugby Aupiki match on 10 March 2022. It was a historical moment for Matatū as this was their first team to take the field. It was a tense match but the Chiefs Manawa edged Matatū 17–15 to win the second match between the teams.

Matatū next played the Blues Women in round 2 of the competition, but lost the game 10–21. In the final round, they faced the Hurricanes Poua at FMG Stadium Waikato in Hamilton, and were defeated 8–16 to finish last overall.

=== 2023 ===
Matatū recorded their first Super Rugby Aupiki win after defeating the Blues Women 33–31 in the opening round of the competition. In round 2 and 3, they lost to the Hurricanes Poua 24–25 and the Chiefs Manawa 38–46. They met the Blues again, but this time in the semi-finals. They defeated them 26–23. They claimed their first title after defeating the Chiefs Manawa 33–31 in the Grand final in Hamilton at FMG Stadium Waikato.

=== 2024 ===
Matatū's 2024 title defense started off with a 17–24 loss to the Blues Women in Invercargill. It was followed by two more defeats to the Hurricanes Poua 29–36 in Wellington and Chiefs Manawa 22–38 in Hamilton. They lost again to the eventual champions Blues Women in Auckland 17–27, before defeating the Hurricanes Poua 37–17, and Chiefs Manawa 22–20 in both rematches.

=== 2025 ===
In 2025, Matatū defeated the Chiefs Manawa (31–25) in Hamilton to kickstart their campaign. They then went on to defeat the Hurricanes Poua with a (29–7) bonus point victory in Christchurch. Matatū suffered their first loss of the season with a (7–28) defeat to the defending champions Blues Women in Nelson. They defeated the Hurricanes Poua again with a (43–24) win in Wellington. They defeated the Blues Women (37–29) in Whangārei to hand them their first loss of the season. Matatū were defeated by the Chiefs Manawa (22–28) in Christchurch in the last game of the regular season. Matatū were defeated by the Blues Women (19–26) in the Final at Eden Park in Auckland.

== Overall record ==
Matatū Super Rugby Aupiki matches
Coach	Period	G	W	L	D	P%
Blues Women	2022–	8	3	5	0	38%
Chiefs Manawa	2022–	7	3	4	0	43%
Hurricanes Poua	2022–	6	3	3	0	50%
(2022–present)^{*}		21	9	12	0	43%
Updated to: 12 April 2025

Notes:

^* Official Super Rugby Aupiki competition matches only, including finals.

=== Season standings ===
A summary of Matatu's results in the regular season is shown below:

Season	Pos	Pld	W	L	D	F	A	+/-	BP	Pts	Notes
2022	4th	3	0	3	0	31	56	-25	1	1	Finished 4th overall
2023	2nd	3	1	2	0	95	102	-7	1	5	Defeated the Chiefs Manawa in the final
2024	3rd	6	2	4	0	144	162	-18	3	11	Finished 3rd overall
2025	2nd	6	4	2	0	169	141	+28	2	19	Lost to the Blues Women in the final
2026	1st	6	4	2	0	198	157	+41	3	19	Lost to the Blues Women in the final

== Current squad ==
The Matatū squad for the 2026 Super Rugby Aupiki season is:

2026 Matatū squad
**Props**: (New Zealand) Eilis Doyle; (New Zealand) **Phillipa Love**; (New Zealand) **Marcelle Parkes**; (New Zealand) **Maddi Robinson**; (New Zealand) Wikitoria Rogers; (New Zealand) **Santo Taumata**; **Hookers**: (New Zealand) **Natalie Delamere**; (New Zealand) Holly Greenway; (United States) **Jett Hayward**; (New Zealand) **Georgia Ponsonby** (Note: Ponsonby wasn't named in the original Matatū squad, but was announced in the side for Round 6.); **Locks**: (New Zealand) **Laura Bayfield**; (New Zealand) **Chelsea Bremner**; (New Zealand) Emma Dermody; (New Zealand) Sophie Kerr ^{ST} (Note: Kerr wasn't named in the original Matatū squad, but was announced in the side for Round 1.)	**Loose forwards**: (New Zealand) **Lucy Jenkins**; (New Zealand) Sarah Jones; (New Zealand) Elinor-Plum King; (New Zealand) Paris Lokotui; (New Zealand) **Kaipo Olsen-Baker**; (New Zealand) Fiaali'i Solomona; **Halfbacks (scrum-halves)**: (New Zealand) **Maia Joseph**; (New Zealand) Kelsyn McCook; (United States) **Abigail Paton**; **First five-eighths (fly-halves)**: (New Zealand) **Hannah King**	**Midfielders (centres)**: (New Zealand) **Grace Brooker** **(c)**; (New Zealand) **Amy du Plessis**; (New Zealand) Charntay Poko ^{ST} (Note: Poko wasn't named in the original Matatū squad, but was announced in the side for Round 1.); (New Zealand) Naomi Sopoaga; **Outside backs**: (New Zealand) Poppy Baxter; (New Zealand) Maia Davis; (New Zealand) Lialanie Muamua ^{ST} (Note: Muamua wasn't named in the original Matatū squad, but was announced in the side for Round 1.); (New Zealand) Winnie Palamo; (New Zealand) **Alena Saili**; (New Zealand) Charlotte Va'afusuaga
**(c)** denotes the team captain. **Bold** denotes internationally capped players.^{ST} denotes a short-term signing. Source:

== Coaching staff ==
In 2021, Blair Baxter was announced as Matatū's inaugural Head Coach, with Whitney Hansen and Tony Christie appointed as the two assistant coaches. Baxter stepped down from the role after the 2023 season. Whitney Hansen was named as Matatū's Head coach for the 2024 season. After Hansen was appointed as Head Coach of the Black Ferns in December 2025, Baxter was once again announced as Matatū's Head Coach for the 2026 Super Rugby Aupiki season.

- Head Coach: Blair Baxter
- Assistant Coach: Simon Kneebone
- Assistant Coach: Jason Kjestrup

== Captain ==
Captain	Years
(New Zealand) Alana Bremner	2022–2025
(New Zealand) Grace Brooker	2026

== Coaching record ==
Matatū coaches by date, matches and win percentage*
Coach	Period	G	W	L	D	%
Blair Baxter	2022–2023	8	3	5	0	38%
Whitney Hansen	2024–2025	12	6	7	0	46%
Blair Baxter	2026–	0	0	0	0	0%
Totals (2022–present)^{*}		21	9	12	0	43%
Updated to: 12 April 2025

Notes:

^* Official Super Rugby Aupiki competition matches only, including finals.
