= Chiefs Manawa =

New Zealand rugby union team

- Union: New Zealand Rugby
- Founded: 2021; 5 years ago
- Location: Hamilton, New Zealand
- Region: Bay of Plenty; Waikato; Taranaki
- Coach: Dwayne Sweeney
- Captain: Kennedy Tukuafu
- Most appearances: Kennedy Tukuafu (22)
- Top scorer: Renee Holmes (87)
- Most tries: Luka Connor (17)
- League: Super Rugby Aupiki
- 2026: Fourth overall

Official website
- www.chiefs.co.nz

The Chiefs Manawa are a New Zealand women's professional rugby union team based in Hamilton, New Zealand, that competes in the Super Rugby Aupiki competition.

Chiefs Manawa won the inaugural season of the Super Rugby Aupiki competition. They went undefeated throughout the season and beat the Blues Women 35–0 in the final round to claim the title.

In 2023 they continued their winning streak throughout the regular season, however were defeated by Matatū in the final.

The Chiefs Manawa were finalists for the third straight year in 2024 facing the Blues Women at Eden Park but once again finished runner-up. However, following the final they re-connected to field a Chiefs Manawa Development XV to face the USA ahead of their PAC4 test against the Black Ferns. The Chiefs Manawa Development XV tied with the US in the training game 29–29.

== History ==
=== Historic clash ===
The Chiefs and Blues women created history when they clashed in the first-ever women's Super Rugby match in New Zealand on 1 May 2021. The game was hosted by the Blues at Eden Park and was played as a double header before the Round 10 Super Rugby Aotearoa match between their men's teams. The Chiefs were sponsored by the Waitomo Group, which is a Waikato-based fuel company, and were named Waitomo Wahine Chiefs.

The Chiefs proved too good for the Blues women and dealt them a major defeat in their historic match. They won 39–12 as both teams exhibited their skills and scored some impressive tries.

=== Super Rugby Aupiki announcement; Squad and Coaching team named ===
On 6 October 2021, New Zealand Rugby confirmed an elite Four-team women's competition called Super Rugby Aupiki for March 2022. The competition would run for four weeks with the women being paid for their participation.

The Chiefs released a list of player signings along with the other three teams in November 2021. The coaching set-up was announced later with Allan Bunting named as Head Coach, he would be assisted by Crystal Kaua and Rodney Gibbs.

=== Team name and identity ===
The Chiefs unveiled their new name and the jersey the women's team would be using in the inaugural season of Super Rugby Aupiki. It was revealed that the team would be known as Chiefs Manawa. The word Manawa is derived from two words – mana and wāhine. The Chiefs Mana being a "central pillar of the club and wāhine being the most identifiable feature of the team."

Newly appointed Head coach, Allan Bunting, led the process of developing the new team identity together with the Chiefs head coach Clayton McMillan, New Zealand Rugby's Māori cultural advisor Luke Crawford, Chiefs jersey designer Dave Burke, Chiefs general manager Kate Rawnsley and a number of players.

The team jersey was also unveiled at the same time, the most important aspect of the design is the mangōpare (the hammerhead shark) – the design depicting "determination and tenacity"; When viewed from another angle the pattern depicts the Manawa (beating heart) shape. Incorporated into the jersey is the Te Raranga Harakeke – the flax weave - "which connects to the more feminine art of weaving." It sits in behind the flowing design of the kōwhaiwhai pattern which "represents the connecting waterways flowing in the Chiefs contributing regions."

=== Inaugural season Champions ===
Chiefs Manawa played Matatū in a pre-season game ahead of the inaugural Super Rugby Aupiki season, they won a 28–20.

Chiefs Manawa faced Matatū again in the opening match of the Super Rugby Aupiki season. They were victorious after a hard-fought match with a score of 17–15. They then met Hurricanes Poua in round two, they ran in five tries to win their second game 29–8 and remain unbeaten.

The final round saw them face-off against the Blues as they kept them scoreless with a 35–0 win and crowned the first champions of Super Rugby Aupiki.

=== 2023 ===
Crystal Kaua was appointed as the new Head Coach of Chiefs Manawa for the 2023 Super Rugby Aupiki season. The Chiefs Rugby Club announced that the Chiefs Manawa would play in the same jersey as the men's team to solidify them as a part of the club and to continue to push for equal opportunities in rugby.

== Current squad ==
The Chiefs Manawa squad for the 2026 Super Rugby Aupiki season is:

2026 Chiefs Manawa squad
**Props**: (New Zealand) Chyann Kaitapu; (New Zealand) **Veisinia Mahutariki-Fakalelu**; (New Zealand) Amber Mundell; (New Zealand) Te Urupounamu McGarvey; (New Zealand) Lonita Ngalu; (New Zealand) **Awhina Tangen-Wainohu** (injured) (Note: Awhina Tangen-Wainohu was named in the original Chiefs Manawa squad, but announced her retirement in May 2026.); **Hookers**: (New Zealand) **Vici-Rose Green**; (New Zealand) Nicole Purdom; **Locks**: (Fiji) **Jade Coates**; (New Zealand) Olivia Holten; (New Zealand) Leomie Kloppers; (New Zealand) Leata Puni Lio; (New Zealand) Jessie Wharekura	**Loose forwards**: (New Zealand) **Mia Anderson**; (New Zealand) Tynealle Fitzgerald; (New Zealand) Chyna Hohepa; (New Zealand) Finau Mafi (Note: Mafi wasn't named in the original Chiefs Manawa squad, but was announced in the side for Round 6.); (New Zealand) **Kennedy Tukuafu** **(c)**; **Halfbacks (scrum-halves)**: (New Zealand) Reese Anderson; (New Zealand) **Ariana Bayler**; (New Zealand) Holli O'Sullivan; **First five-eighths (fly-halves)**: (New Zealand) Louise Blyde; (Australia) **Carys Dallinger**; (New Zealand) Kaea Nepia (injured) (Note: Ruled out for the season through injury ahead of the season.)	**Midfielders (centres)**: (New Zealand) Levonah Motuliki; (New Zealand) Kiriana Nolan; (Canada) **Shoshanah Seumanutafa**; **Outside backs**: (New Zealand) Madison Flutey; (New Zealand) Huia Harding ^{ST}; (New Zealand) Lela Ieremia; (New Zealand) **Justine McGregor**; (New Zealand) Manaia Nuku; (New Zealand) Presayus Singh; (New Zealand) Shyrah Tuliau-Tua'a
**(c)** denotes the team captain. **Bold** denotes internationally capped players.^{ST} denotes a short-term signing. denotes an injured player. Source:

== Current coaches and management ==
- Head Coach: Dwayne Sweeney
- Assistant Coach: Carla Hohepa
- Assistant Coach: Kelly Brazier
- Assistant Coach: Nathan White

== Captains ==
Coach	Period	Ref
Les Elder	2022	
Kennedy Tukuafu	2023–present	

== Coaches ==
Chiefs Manawa coaches by date, matches and win percentage*
Coach	Period	G	W	D	L	%
Allan Bunting	2022	3	3	0	0	100%
Crystal Kaua	2023–2024	12	8	0	4	66.66%
Dwayne Sweeney	2025–	6	3	0	3	50%
Totals (2022–present)^{*}		21	14	0	7	66.66%
Updated to: 5 April 2025

Notes:

^* Official Super Rugby Aupiki competition matches only, including finals.
