= Super Rugby Aupiki =

Women's rugby union competition in NZ

- Upcoming season or competition: 2026 Super Rugby Aupiki season
- Sport: Rugby union
- Founded: 2022; 4 years ago
- First season: 2022
- No. of teams: 4
- Country: New Zealand
- Most recent champion: Blues Women (2026)
- Most titles: Blues Women (3 titles)
- Broadcaster: Sky
- Related competitions: Super Rugby Women's; Farah Palmer Cup
- Website: superrugby.co.nz

Super Rugby Aupiki is a professional women's rugby union club competition in New Zealand. Its inaugural season was held in March 2022. It is a stepping stone between the Farah Palmer Cup and the Black Ferns. Aupiki translates as ‘the ascent to the upper-most realm’.

== Format ==
In 2022, the four teams were supposed to have three regular season matches with one home and away game, and one Super Round fixture. The top two teams at the end of the three rounds would contest the final. The competition was reformatted as a round robin fixture because of the impact of COVID-19. All the squads were strongly affected with player isolations and COVID-19 cases. The inaugural champion was crowned based on their competition points after the final round.

The 2023 season was played over a period of five weeks with ten games in total. Each team played three regular season matches and two play-off matches.

In 2024, the competition was extended from three regular season matches and two play-off matches to a complete home and away round-robin format, followed by a final. This meant that each of the four teams played at least six games during the regular season – three at home and three away. The two highest ranked teams at the end of the regular season contested the final at the home ground of the highest placed team. The new competition format resulted in a total of thirteen matches played over a seven-week period.

The season fixtures for the 2025 Super Rugby Aupiki season were released on 20 November 2024, consisting of six rounds and a grand final to decide the season champions. The 2025 Super Rugby Aupiki champions will play the champions of the Australian Super Rugby competition, Super Rugby Women's, at the end of the season. This new competition is called the Super Rugby Champions Final. It will be the first edition of the new competition.

New Zealand Rugby announced changes to the 2026 Super Rugby Aupiki season which was previously played through March and April. The competition will now take place between June and August, with six regular season games and a Grand Final.

== History ==
=== 2022 ===
The Chiefs Manawa won the inaugural title of the 2022 Super Rugby Aupiki season. They defeated the Blues Women 35–0 in the final round of the competition.

=== 2023 ===
Matatū were crowned 2023 Super Rugby Aupiki champions after beating Chiefs Manawa 33–31 in a hard-fought match. Matatū won their first title and also handed defending champions, Chiefs Manawa, their first-ever loss in the competition.

=== 2024 ===
The 2024 tournament was won by Blues Women, who defeated Chiefs Manawa 24–18 in the final in Auckland, earning them their first Super Rugby Aupiki title.

=== 2025 ===
Blues successfully defended their title against Matatū in the grand final and won their second consecutive championship. They went on to defeat the Super Rugby Women's champions, the NSW Waratahs, to win the inaugural Super Rugby Women's Championship final in Auckland.

=== 2026 ===
Blues Women were crowned 2026 Super Rugby Aupiki champions after successfully defending their title, beating Matatū 28–21 in a rematch of the previous year's grand final.

== Teams ==
There are four teams that compete in the competition. The three teams based in the north are aligned similarly with their Super Rugby franchises with a few changes and exceptions. Blues Women represents the far north regions of Northland, Auckland and Counties Manukau. Chiefs Manawa represents the central north island regions of Waikato, Bay of Plenty and Taranaki. Hurricanes Poua represents the lower north island regions of Manawatū and Wellington. The southern team, Matatū, is governed by the Crusaders and also includes the Highlanders region. As of current up-to-date information available, It is not known what Super Rugby Aupiki franchise North Harbour and Hawke's Bay are affiliated with, if they are affiliated with any franchise.

Team	Coach	City	Stadium	Capacity	First season
Blues Women	Willie Walker	Auckland, Auckland Region	Eden Park	50,000	2022
Chiefs Manawa	Crystal Kaua	Hamilton, Waikato	FMG Stadium Waikato	25,800	2022
Hurricanes Poua	Victoria Grant	Wellington, Wellington Region	Maidstone Park	Unknown	2022
Matatū	Blair Baxter	Christchurch, Canterbury	One New Zealand Stadium	30,000	2022

Below is an expanded table with specific details about each team

Club	Location	Feeder Area(s) (Farah Palmer Cup)	Home Ground(s)	First season	Championships
Blues Women	Auckland	Farah Palmer Cup Provinces: Auckland; Counties Manukau; Northland	Navigation Homes Stadium; Eden Park; Semenoff Stadium; Bell Park; FMG Stadium Waikato, Hamilton; North Harbour Stadium, Albany, North Shore	2022	3 (2024, 2025, 2026)
Chiefs Manawa	Hamilton	Farah Palmer Cup Provinces: Bay of Plenty; Taranaki; Waikato	Navigation Homes Stadium, Pukekohe; FMG Stadium Waikato; Fred Jones Park	2022	1 (2022)
Matatū	Christchurch	Farah Palmer Cup Provinces: Canterbury; Tasman; Otago; Southland	Ngā Puna Wai Sports Hub; Apollo Projects Stadium; Forsyth Barr Stadium; One Stadium NZ; Trafalgar Park; Rugby Park Stadium; Fraser Park; FMG Stadium Waikato, Hamilton	2022	1 (2023)
Hurricanes Poua	Wellington	Farah Palmer Cup Provinces: Manawatu; Wellington	Central Energy Trust Arena; Levin Domain; Maidstone Park; Hnry Stadium; NZCIS; FMG Stadium Waikato, Hamilton	2022	0

Blues Women = Dark Blue

Chiefs Manawa = Black

Hurricanes Poua = Yellow

Matatū = Cyan

== Champions ==
The following sides have won Super Rugby Aupiki titles.

Season	Champions	Final	Runners-up
2022	Chiefs Manawa	No final (Note: A Round-robin tournament determined the final standings.)	Hurricanes Poua
2023	Matatū	33–31	Chiefs Manawa
2024	Blues Women	24–18	Chiefs Manawa
2025	Blues Women	26–19	Matatū
2026	Blues Women	28–21	Matatū

== Players ==
Each team contracts 28-players for the Super Rugby Aupiki season. All players will be paid for participating within the tournament, with all players being on professional or semi-professional contracts.

== Television ==
Matches in the Super Rugby Aupiki competition are televised by Sky Sport in New Zealand.

== See also ==
- New Zealand women's national rugby union team
- New Zealand women's national rugby sevens team
- Farah Palmer Cup
- Super W
