= 2019 Laurie O'Reilly Cup =

Tournament details
- Date: 10–17 August 2019
- Countries: Australia; New Zealand
- Teams: 2

Final positions
- Champions: New Zealand (12th title)

Tournament statistics
- Matches played: 2
- Tries scored: 16 (8 per match)
- Top scorer(s): Charmaine McMenamin; Kendra Cocksedge (15 points)
- Most tries: Charmaine McMenamin (3 tries)

The 2019 Laurie O'Reilly Cup was the 12th edition of the competition. The first test was played in Perth on August 10 and the second test was played in Auckland on August 17. The tests were part of double-header matches between the All Blacks and Australia during their Bledisloe Cup series.

The Black Ferns won the series in a clean sweep and successfully defended their title.

== Table ==
Place	Nation	Games				Points		
Place	Nation	Played	Won	Drawn	Lost	For	Against	Diff
1	New Zealand	2	2	0	0	84	18	66
2	Australia	2	0	0	2	18	84	-66

== Fixtures ==
=== Game 1 ===
Test: 1349	10 August 2019	Australia	10–47	New Zealand	Optus Stadium
	7pm (NZT)	Try: Lori Cramer (2)		Try: Charmaine McMenamin (2); Renee Wickliffe; Ruahei Demant; Selica Winiata; Les Elder; Ayesha Leti-I'iga; Joanah Ngan-Woo; Con: Kendra Cocksedge; Ruahei Demant; Pen: Kendra Cocksedge	Referee: (Scotland) Hollie Davidson

FB	15	Mahalia Murphy
RW	14	Samantha Treherne
OC	13	Alysia Lefau-Fakaosilea
IC	12	Ariana Hira-Herangi
LW	11	Lori Cramer
FH	10	Trilleen Pomare
SH	9	Georgia Cormick
N8	8	Grace Hamilton (c)
BF	7	Emily Chancellor
OF	6	Millie Boyle (vc)
RL	5	Alisha Hewett
LL	4	Michaela Leonard
TP	3	Evelyn Horomia
HK	2	Averyl Mitchell
LP	1	Liz Patu
Replacements:
HK	16	Ashley Marsters
PR	17	Emily Robinson
PR	18	Christina Sekona
FL	19	Rebecca Clough
FL	20	Shannon Mato
SH	21	Iliseva Batibasaga
FH	22	Arabella McKenzie
CE	23	Mhicca Carter
Coach:
(Australia) Dwayne Nestor

FB	15	Selica Winiata (vc)
RW	14	Renee Wickliffe
OC	13	Carla Hohepa
IC	12	Chelsea Alley
LW	11	Ayesha Leti-I'iga
FH	10	Ruahei Demant
SH	9	Kendra Cocksedge (vc)
N8	8	Charmaine McMenamin
BF	7	Les Elder (c)
OF	6	Pia Tapsell
RL	5	Charmaine Smith
LL	4	Eloise Blackwell
TP	3	Aleisha-Pearl Nelson
HK	2	Te Kura Ngata-Aerengemate
LP	1	Toka Natua
Replacements:
HK	16	Forne Burkin
PR	17	Leilani Perese
PR	18	Olivia Ward-Duin
LK	19	Joanah Ngan-Woo
FL	20	Kennedy Simon
SH	21	Arihiana Marino-Tauhinu
BK	22	Krysten Cottrell
BK	23	Kilisitina Moata'ane
Coach:
(New Zealand) Glenn Moore

Assistant referees:
(Australia) Amy Perrett
(Australia) Amber McLachlan

Notes:

- centre Kilisitina Moata'ane and prop Olivia Ward-Duin made their international debut for the Black Ferns.

=== Game 2 ===
Test: 1352	17 August 2019	New Zealand	37–8	Australia	Eden Park
	5pm (NZT)	Try: Ruahei Demant; Eloise Blackwell; Carla Hohepa; Charmaine McMenamin; Charmaine Smith; Con: Kendra Cocksedge (2); Chelsea Alley; Pen: Kendra Cocksedge (2)		Try: Mahalia Murphy; Pen: Lori Cramer	Referee: (South Africa) Aimee Barrett-Theron

FB	15	Selica Winiata (vc)
RW	14	Renee Wickliffe
OC	13	Carla Hohepa
IC	12	Chelsea Alley
LW	11	Ayesha Leti-I'iga
FH	10	Ruahei Demant
SH	9	Kendra Cocksedge (vc)
N8	8	Charmaine McMenamin
BF	7	Les Elder (c)
OF	6	Pia Tapsell
RL	5	Charmaine Smith
LL	4	Eloise Blackwell
TP	3	Aleisha-Pearl Nelson
HK	2	Te Kura Ngata-Aerengemate
LP	1	Toka Natua
Replacements:
HK	16	Luka Connor
PR	17	Leilani Perese
PR	18	Olivia Ward-Duin
FL	19	Jackie Patea-Fereti
FL	20	Kennedy Simon
SH	21	Arihiana Marino-Tauhinu
FH	22	Krysten Cottrell
BK	23	Grace Brooker
Coach:
(New Zealand) Glenn Moore

FB	15	Mhicca Carter
RW	14	Mahalia Murphy
OC	13	Alysia Lefau-Fakaosilea
IC	12	Ariana Hira-Herangi
LW	11	Lori Cramer
FH	10	Trilleen Pomare
SH	9	Georgia Cormick
N8	8	Grace Hamilton (c)
BF	7	Shannon Mato
OF	6	Millie Boyle (vc)
RL	5	Alisha Hewett
LL	4	Michaela Leonard
TP	3	Evelyn Horomia
HK	2	Averyl Mitchell
LP	1	Liz Patu
Replacements:
HK	16	Ashley Marsters
PR	17	Emily Robinson
PR	18	Christina Sekona
LK	19	Michelle Milward
FL	20	Emily Chancellor
SH	21	Iliseva Batibasaga
BK	22	Arabella McKenzie
BK	23	Samantha Treherne
Coach:
(Australia) Dwayne Nestor

== Squads ==
=== Australia ===
Head Coach Dwayne Nestor named a 28-player squad for the 2019 Laurie O'Reilly Cup.

Head coach: (Australia) Dwayne Nestor

Player	Position	Super Club
Millie Boyle (vc)	Forward	Queensland Reds
Emily Chancellor	Forward	NSW Waratahs
Rebecca Clough	Forward	Western Force
Grace Hamilton (c)	Forward	NSW Waratahs
Alisha Hewett	Forward	Queensland Reds
Evelyn Horomia	Forward	NSW Waratahs
Asoiva Karpani	Forward	NSW Waratahs
Michaela Leonard	Forward	Brumbies
Ashley Marsters	Forward	Melbourne Rebels
Michelle Milward	Forward	Brumbies
Shannon Mato	Forward	Queensland Reds
Averyl Mitchell	Forward	Queensland Reds
Sera Naiqama	Forward	NSW Waratahs
Liz Patu	Forward	Queensland Reds
Emily Robinson	Forward	NSW Waratahs
Christina Sekona	Forward	Queensland Reds
Iliseva Batibasaga	Back	NSW Waratahs
Mhicca Carter	Back	Western Force
Georgia Cormick	Back	Melbourne Rebels
Lori Cramer	Back	Queensland Reds
Ariana Hira-Herangi	Back	Western Force
Alysia Lefau-Fakaosilea	Back	Queensland Reds
Arabella McKenzie	Back	NSW Waratahs
Mahalia Murphy	Back	NSW Waratahs
Trilleen Pomare	Back	Western Force
Sarah Riordan	Back	Queensland Reds
Alana Elisaia	Back	Queensland Reds
Samantha Treherne	Back	Queensland Reds

=== New Zealand ===
Head Coach Glenn Moore named a 28-player squad for the 2019 Laurie O'Reilly Cup.

Head coach: (New Zealand) Glenn Moore

Player	Position	Province
Forne Burkin	Hooker	Canterbury
Luka Connor	Hooker	Bay of Plenty
Te Kura Ngata-Aerengemate	Hooker	Northland
Toka Natua	Prop	Waikato
Aleisha-Pearl Nelson	Prop	Auckland
Leilani Perese	Prop	Counties Manukau
Olivia Ward-Duin	Prop	North Harbour
Eloise Blackwell	Lock	Auckland
Karli Faneva	Lock	Bay of Plenty
Joanah Ngan-Woo	Lock	Wellington
Jackie Patea-Fereti	Lock	Wellington
Charmaine Smith	Lock	Auckland
Les Elder (c)	Loose forward	Bay of Plenty
Charmaine McMenamin	Loose forward	Auckland
Marcelle Parkes	Loose forward	Wellington
Pia Tapsell	Loose forward	North Harbour
Kendra Cocksedge (vc)	Halfback	Canterbury
Arihiana Marino-Tauhinu	Halfback	Counties Manukau
Chelsea Alley	Inside Back	Waikato
Grace Brooker	Inside Back	Canterbury
Krysten Cottrell	Inside Back	Hawke's Bay
Ruahei Demant	Inside Back	Auckland
Kilisitina Moata'ane	Inside Back	Otago
Carla Hohepa	Outside Back	Waikato
Ayesha Leti-I'iga	Outside Back	Wellington
Natahlia Moors	Outside Back	Auckland
Renee Wickliffe	Outside Back	Bay of Plenty
Selica Winiata (vc)	Outside Back	Manawatu

== Broadcast ==
All the O’Reilly Cup matches were broadcast LIVE on FOX SPORTS, Kayo and RUGBY.com.au Radio in Australia.
