= 2015 Women's Rugby Super Series =

- Countries: Canada; England; New Zealand; United States
- Champions: New Zealand
- Runners-up: England
- Matches played: 6
- Tries scored: 45 (average 7.5 per match)
- Top point scorer: (New Zealand) Kendra Cocksedge (26)
- Top try scorer: (New Zealand) Honey Hireme (5) (United States) Jessica Wooden (5)

The inaugural 2015 Women's Rugby Super Series was an international women's rugby union competition contested by World Cup holders England, runners-up Canada, New Zealand and the United States.

The Super Series succeeded the Nations Cup, another international tournament organized jointly by the United States, England and Canada with rotating host locations. Guest teams from other nations also took part, most recently South Africa. Canada took home the last Nations Cup beating England and ending their 17-game winning streak. The format changed with a round-robin tournament now being played over three days in three locations, Calgary, Red Deer and Edmonton.

The tournament winners were New Zealand, with runners-up England, the United States third and finally Canada.

== Table ==
Pos	Team	Pld	W	D	L	PF	PA	PD	Pts
1	New Zealand	3	3	0	0	113	43	+70	14
2	England	3	2	0	1	61	53	+8	9
3	United States	3	1	0	2	63	114	−51	5
4	Canada	3	0	0	3	64	91	−27	0

=== Points scoring ===
4 points awarded for a win, 2 points for a draw, no points for a loss. 1 bonus point awarded for scoring four or more tries and 1 bonus point for losing by less than 7 points.

== Fixtures and results ==
=== Day one ===
27 June 2015

United States	13–39	England

Calgary Rugby Park, Calgary, Alberta
Referee: Sherry Trumbull (Canada)

Team:
FB	15	Jessica Wooden
RW	14	Kelsi Stockert
OC	13	Jane Paar
IC	12	Jenn Sever
LW	11	Cheta Emba
FH	10	Kimber Rozier
SH	9	Deven Owsiany
N8	8	Jordan Gray
OF	7	Elizabeth Cairns
BF	6	Laura Miller
RL	5	Alycia Washington
LL	4	Stacey Bridges
TP	3	Hope Rogers
HK	2	Katy Augustyn
LP	1	Sarah Chobot (C)
Replacements:
HK	16	Sam Pankey
PR	17	Baylee Annis
PR	18	Catie Benson
LK	19	Molly Kinsella
FL	20	Sara Parsons
SH	21	Jennifer Lui
FH	22	Lauren Rhode
WG	23	Nicole Heavirland
Coach:
(United States) Pete Steinberg

Team:
FB	15	Sarah McKenna
RW	14	Kay Wilson
OC	13	Amber Reed
IC	12	Ceri Large
LW	11	Katie Mason
FH	10	Emily Scott
SH	9	Bianca Blackburn
N8	8	Sarah Hunter (C)
OF	7	Marlie Packer
BF	6	Hannah Gallagher
RL	5	Abbie Scott
LL	4	Rowena Burnfield
TP	3	Laura Keates
HK	2	Amy Cokayne
LP	1	Vicky Cornborough
Replacements:
HK	16	Rochelle Clark
PR	17	Lark Davies
PR	18	Justine Lucas
LK	19	Tamara Taylor
FL	20	Alex Matthews
SH	21	Leanne Riley
FH	22	Emily Scarratt
WG	23	Rachel Lund
Coach:
(England) Simon Middleton

Assistant referees:
Rose Labreche (Canada)
Robin Kaluzniak (Canada)

27 June 2015

Canada	22–40	New Zealand

Calgary Rugby Park, Calgary, Alberta
Referee: Leah Berard (USA Rugby)

Team:
FB	15	Julianne Zussman
RW	14	Brittany Waters
OC	13	Amanda Thornborough
IC	12	Andrea Burk
LW	11	Natasha Smith
FH	10	Alex Tessier
SH	9	Chelsea Ross
N8	8	Jacey Gruznick
OF	7	Latoya Blackwood
BF	6	Barbara Mervin
RL	5	Maria Samson
LL	4	Tyson Beukeboom
TP	3	Olivia DeMerchant
HK	2	Jane Kirby
LP	1	Laura Russell (C)
Replacements:
HK	16	Carolyn McEwen
PR	17	Julia Folk
PR	18	DaLeaka Menin
LK	19	Emma Taylor
FL	20	Cindy Nelles
SH	21	Jess Neilson
FH	22	Katie McNally
WG	23	Lisa Gauthier
Coach:
(France) François Ratier

Team:
FB	15	Selica Winiata
RW	14	Honey Hireme
OC	13	Stacey Waaka
IC	12	Chelsea Alley
LW	11	Renee Wickcliffe
FH	10	Victoria Subritzky-Nafatali
SH	9	Kendra Cocksedge
N8	8	Linda Itunu
OF	7	Justine Lavea
BF	6	Charlene Halapua
RL	5	Charmaine Smith
LL	4	Eloise Blackwell
TP	3	Aleisha Nelson
HK	2	Fiao'o Fa'amausili (C)
LP	1	Toka Natua
Replacements:
HK	16	Teresa Te Tamaki	Substituted on
PR	17	Aldora Itunu
PR	18	Te Kura Ngata-Aerengamate
LK	19	Angie Sisifa
FL	20	Lesley Ketu
SH	21	Emma Jensen
FH	22	Kiritapu Demant
WG	23	Janna Vaughan
Coach:
(New Zealand) Glenn Moore

Assistant referees:
Marie Lematte (France)
David Crisp (Canada)

=== Day two ===
1 July 2015

New Zealand	26–7	England

Red Deer Titans Rugby Park, Red Deer, Alberta
Referee: Sherry Trumbull (Canada)

Team:
FB	15
RW	14
OC	13
IC	12
LW	11
FH	10	(C)
SH	9
N8	8
OF	7
BF	6
RL	5
LL	4
TP	3
HK	2
LP	1
Replacements:
HK	16		Substituted on
PR	17
PR	18
LK	19
FL	20
SH	21
FH	22
WG	23
Coach:
(New Zealand) Glenn Moore

Team:
FB	15
RW	14
OC	13
IC	12
LW	11
FH	10	(C)
SH	9
N8	8
OF	7
BF	6
RL	5
LL	4
TP	3
HK	2
LP	1
Replacements:
HK	16		Substituted on
PR	17
PR	18
LK	19
FL	20
SH	21
FH	22
WG	23
Coach:
(England) Simon Middleton

Assistant referees:
Leah Berard (United States)
Robin Kaluzniak (Canada)

1 July 2015

Canada	28–36	United States

Red Deer Titans Rugby Park, Red Deer, Alberta
Referee: Marie Lematte (France)

Team:
FB	15
RW	14
OC	13
IC	12
LW	11
FH	10	(C)
SH	9
N8	8
OF	7
BF	6
RL	5
LL	4
TP	3
HK	2
LP	1
Replacements:
HK	16		Substituted on
PR	17
PR	18
LK	19
FL	20
SH	21
FH	22
WG	23
Coach:
(France) François Ratier

Team:
FB	15
RW	14
OC	13
IC	12
LW	11
FH	10	(C)
SH	9
N8	8
OF	7
BF	6
RL	5
LL	4
TP	3
HK	2
LP	1
Replacements:
HK	16		Substituted on
PR	17
PR	18
LK	19
FL	20
SH	21
FH	22
WG	23
Coach:
(United States) Pete Steinberg

Assistant referees:
Rose Labreche (Canada)
Doug Hamre (Canada)

=== Day three ===
5 July 2015

New Zealand	47–14	United States

Ellerslie Rugby Park, Edmonton, Alberta
Referee: Rose Labreche (Canada)

Team:
FB	15
RW	14
OC	13
IC	12
LW	11
FH	10	(C)
SH	9
N8	8
OF	7
BF	6
RL	5
LL	4
TP	3
HK	2
LP	1
Replacements:
HK	16		Substituted on
PR	17
PR	18
LK	19
FL	20
SH	21
FH	22
WG	23
Coach:
(New Zealand) Glenn Moore

Team:
FB	15
RW	14
OC	13
IC	12
LW	11
FH	10	(C)
SH	9
N8	8
OF	7
BF	6
RL	5
LL	4
TP	3
HK	2
LP	1
Replacements:
HK	16		Substituted on
PR	17
PR	18
LK	19
FL	20
SH	21
FH	22
WG	23
Coach:
(United States) Pete Steinberg

Assistant referees:
Sherry Trumbull (Canada)
Doug Hamre (Canada)

5 July 2015

Canada	14–15	England

Ellerslie Rugby Park, Edmonton, Alberta
Referee: Leah Berard (United States)

Team:
FB	15
RW	14
OC	13
IC	12
LW	11
FH	10	(C)
SH	9
N8	8
OF	7
BF	6
RL	5
LL	4
TP	3
HK	2
LP	1
Replacements:
HK	16		Substituted on
PR	17
PR	18
LK	19
FL	20
SH	21
FH	22
WG	23
Coach:
(France) François Ratier

Team:
FB	15
RW	14
OC	13
IC	12
LW	11
FH	10	(C)
SH	9
N8	8
OF	7
BF	6
RL	5
LL	4
TP	3
HK	2
LP	1
Replacements:
HK	16		Substituted on
PR	17
PR	18
LK	19
FL	20
SH	21
FH	22
WG	23
Coach:
(England) Simon Middleton

Assistant referees:
Marie Lematte (France)
David Crisp (Canada)

== See also ==
- Women's international rugby

Preceded by Nations Cup 2013	Super Series; 2015; New Zealand	Succeeded by Super Series 2016
