= 2018 Laurie O'Reilly Cup =

Tournament details
- Date: 18–25 August 2018
- Countries: Australia; New Zealand
- Teams: 2

Final positions
- Champions: New Zealand (11th title)

Tournament statistics
- Matches played: 2
- Tries scored: 16 (8 per match)
- Top scorer(s): Kendra Cocksedge (26 points)
- Most tries: Fiao'o Fa'amausili (3 tries)

The 2018 Laurie O'Reilly Cup was the 11th edition of the competition. The matches were played on 18 and 25 August with both New Zealand and Australia playing hosts to each other.

The first test occurred in Sydney at the ANZ Stadium; The Black Ferns won the match 31–11 which increased their winning streak to 16. New Zealand dominated the Wallaroos in the second test with a 45–17 victory which saw them retain the Cup and clinch the series.

== Table ==
Place	Nation	Games				Points		
Place	Nation	Played	Won	Drawn	Lost	For	Against	Diff
1	New Zealand	2	2	0	0	76	28	48
2	Australia	2	0	0	2	28	76	-48

== Fixtures ==
=== Game 1 ===
Test: 1276	18 August 2018	Australia	11–31	New Zealand	ANZ Stadium, Sydney
		Try: Alisha Hewett; Pen: Emily Robinson (2)		Try: Kendra Cocksedge; Fiao'o Fa'amausili (3); Aldora Itunu; Con: Kendra Cocksedge (3)	Referee: (Hong Kong) Tim Baker

FB	15	Mahalia Murphy
RW	14	Mhicca Carter
OC	13	Atasi Lafai
IC	12	Crystal Maguire
LW	11	Samantha Treherne
FH	10	Trileen Pomare
SH	9	Cobie-Jane Morgan
N8	8	Grace Hamilton
BF	7	Georgia O'Neill
OF	6	Emily Chancellor
RL	5	Rebecca Clough
LL	4	Michelle Milward
TP	3	Evelyn Horomia
HK	2	Liz Patu (c)
LP	1	Emily Robinson
Replacements:
HK	16	Darryl Wickliffe
PR	17	Melissa Fatu
PR	18	Hana Ngaha
LK	19	Alisha Hewett
BR	20	Kiri Lingman
BR	21	Alice Tonumaivao
SH	22	Fenella Hake
CE	23	Shanice Parker
Coach:
(Australia) Dwayne Nestor

FB	15	Selica Winiata (vc)
RW	14	Renee Wickliffe
OC	13	Stacey Waaka
IC	12	Theresa Fitzpatrick
LW	11	Alena Saili
FH	10	Ruahei Demant
SH	9	Kendra Cocksedge (vc)
N8	8	Aroha Savage
BF	7	Les Elder
OF	6	Charmaine McMenamin
RL	5	Charmaine Smith
LL	4	Eloise Blackwell
TP	3	Aldora Itunu
HK	2	Fiao'o Fa'amausili (c)
LP	1	Phillipa Love
Replacements:
HK	16	Te Kura Ngata-Aerengamate
PR	17	Cristo Tofa
PR	18	Leilani Perese
LK	19	Jackie Patea-Fereti
FL	20	Linda Itunu
SH	21	Kristina Sue
UB	22	Krysten Cottrell
UB	23	Chelsea Alley
Coach:
(New Zealand) Glenn Moore

=== Game 2 ===
Test: 1277	25 August 2018	New Zealand	45–17	Australia	Eden Park, Auckland
		Try: Aldora Itunu; Phillipa Love; Eloise Blackwell; Theresa Fitzpatrick; Kendra Cocksedge; Renee Wickliffe; Selica Winiata; Con: Kendra Cocksedge (5)		Try: Trilleen Pomare; Liz Patu; Hana Ngaha; Con: Fenella Hake	Referee: (England) Ian Tempest

FB	15	Selica Winiata (vc)
RW	14	Renee Wickliffe
OC	13	Stacey Waaka
IC	12	Theresa Fitzpatrick
LW	11	Alena Saili
FH	10	Ruahei Demant
SH	9	Kendra Cocksedge (vc)
N8	8	Aroha Savage
BF	7	Les Elder
OF	6	Charmaine McMenamin
RL	5	Charmaine Smith
LL	4	Eloise Blackwell
TP	3	Aldora Itunu
HK	2	Fiao'o Fa'amausili (c)
LP	1	Phillipa Love
Replacements:
HK	16	Te Kura Ngata-Aerengamate
PR	17	Cristo Tofa
PR	18	Leilani Perese
FL	19	Jackie Patea-Fereti
FL	20	Linda Itunu
SH	21	Kristina Sue
FH	22	Krysten Cottrell
CE	23	Chelsea Alley
Coach:
(New Zealand) Glenn Moore

FB	15	Mahalia Murphy
RW	14	Mhicca Carter
OC	13	Atasi Lafai
IC	12	Sarah Riordan
LW	11	Samantha Treherne
FH	10	Trileen Pomare
SH	9	Cobie-Jane Morgan
N8	8	Grace Hamilton
BF	7	Georgia O'Neill
OF	6	Emily Chancellor
RL	5	Rebecca Clough
LL	4	Michelle Milward
TP	3	Evelyn Horomia
HK	2	Liz Patu (c)
LP	1	Emily Robinson
Replacements:
HK	16	Darryl Wickliffe
PR	17	Melissa Fatu
PR	18	Hana Ngaha
LK	19	Alisha Hewett
BR	20	Kiri Lingman
SH	21	Fenella Hake
CE	22	Crystal Maguire
BK	23	Shanice Parker
Coach:
(Australia) Dwayne Nestor

Assistant referees:
(Hong Kong) Tim Baker
(New Zealand) Rebecca Mahoney

== Broadcast ==
The matches were broadcast live in New Zealand on SKY TV.
