= 2019 Women's Rugby Super Series =

International rugby union competition

Women's Rugby Super Series 2019
- Countries: Canada; England; France; New Zealand; United States
- Champions: New Zealand
- Runners-up: England
- Matches played: 10
- Tries scored: 59 (average 5.9 per match)
- Top point scorer: (New Zealand) Kendra Cocksedge (45)
- Top try scorer: (England) Emily Scarratt (4)

The 2019 Women's Rugby Super Series was the third series of the Women's Rugby Super Series, a women's international rugby union competition featuring the best-ranked sides. Unlike the previous editions of the Super Series in 2015 and 2016 which featured four teams, the 2019 edition featured five. The teams were the top five ranked in the world, hosts the United States, defending champions Canada, 2016 debutants France, Six Nations Grand Slam champions and two-time runners-up England, and 2015 champions and current world champions New Zealand. The tournament was won by New Zealand with England second and France third.

== Table ==
Position	Nation	Matches				Points			Tries	Bonus points		Table points
Position	Nation	Played	Won	Drawn	Lost	For	Against	Diff	Tries	T BP	L BP	Table points
1	New Zealand	4	3	0	1	112	58	+54	13	2	0	14
2	England	4	3	0	1	90	78	+12	13	1	0	13
3	France	4	2	0	2	115	86	+29	15	1	1	10
4	Canada	4	1	0	3	91	93	-2	12	1	2	7
5	United States	4	1	0	3	41	142	-101	6	0	0	4

== Fixtures ==
=== 28 June ===
Test: 1331	28 June 2019	(1 BP) England	38–5	United States	Chula Vista Elite Athlete Training Center, San Diego, California
	13:00 PDT (UTC-7)	Try: Smith 8' c MacDonald 24' c Scarratt 31' c Kerr (2) 40' +1 m, 47' m Hunt 54' c Con: Scarratt (4) 9', 25', 32', 56'		Try: Rogers 14' m	Referee: (Ireland) Joy Neville

FB	15	Sarah McKenna
RW	14	Lydia Thompson
OC	13	Emily Scarratt	(substituted off) 59'
IC	12	Amber Reed
LW	11	Kelly Smith	(substituted off) 52'
FH	10	Zoe Harrison	(substituted off) 59'
SH	9	Claudia MacDonald
N8	8	Poppy Cleall	(yellow card) 43' to 53'
OF	7	Marlie Packer	(substituted off) 31'
BF	6	Jo Brown
RL	5	Abbie Scott (c)
LL	4	Zoe Aldcroft	(substituted off) 64'
TP	3	Sarah Bern	(substituted off) 61'
HK	2	Heather Kerr	(substituted off) 52'
LP	1	Ellena Perry	(substituted off) 52'
Replacements:
HK	16	Clara Nielson	(substituted on) 52'
PR	17	Hannah Botterman	(substituted on) 52'
PR	18	Chloe Edwards	(substituted on) 61'
LK	19	Catherine O'Donnell	(substituted on) 64'
FL	20	Sarah Beckett	(substituted on) 31'
SH	21	Natasha Hunt	(substituted on) 52'
CE	22	Emily Wood	(substituted on) 59'
FH	23	Emily Scott	(substituted on) 59'
Coach:
(England) Simon Middleton

FB	15	Bulou Mataitoga	(substituted off) 61'
RW	14	Bui Baravilala
OC	13	Alev Kelter
IC	12	Eti Haungatau	(substituted off) 54'
LW	11	Jennine Duncan
FH	10	Gabby Cantorna	(substituted off) 8'	(substituted on) 51'
SH	9	Ashlee Byrge	(substituted off) 59'
N8	8	Asinate Serevi	(substituted off) 49'
OF	7	Joycelynn Taufa
BF	6	Katherine Zackary (c)
RL	5	Stacey Bridges
LL	4	Kristine Sommar	(substituted off) 59'
TP	3	Hope Rogers	(substituted off) 61'
HK	2	Joanna Kitlinkski
LP	1	Catherine Benson	(substituted off) 54'
Replacements:
HK	16	Nick James	(substituted on) 61'
PR	17	Charli Jacoby	(substituted on) 54'
PR	18	Alycia Washington	(substituted on) 59'
LK	19	Elizabeth Cairns	(substituted on) 49'
FL	20	Olivia Ortiz	(substituted on) 59'	(yellow card) 79' to end'
CE	21	Emily Henrich	(substituted on) 61'
WG	22	Kris Thomas	(substituted on) 54'
FH	23	Katana Howard	(substituted on) 8'	(substituted off) 51'
Coach:
(England) Rob Cain

Test: 1332	28 June 2019	Canada	20–35	New Zealand (1 BP)	Chula Vista Elite Athlete Training Center, San Diego, California
	16:00 PDT (UTC-7)	Try: Alerie 15' c de Goede 56' c Con: Miller (2) 16', 58'; Pen: Miller (2) 28', 33'		Try: Blackwell 10' c Hohepa 24' c Alley 45' c Leti-I'iga 61' m Con: Cocksedge (3) 11', 25', 46'; Pen: Cocksedge (3) 37', 40' +2, 71'	Referee: (England) Sara Cox

FB	15	Irene Patrinos	(substituted off) 63'
RW	14	Paige Farries
OC	13	Anaïs Holly
IC	12	Sara Kaljuvee
LW	11	Elissa Alarie
FH	10	Alexandra Tessier	(substituted off) 67'
SH	9	Brianna Miller
N8	8	Gabrielle Senft	(substituted off) 59'
OF	7	Janna Slevinsky
BF	6	Fabiola Forteza	(substituted off) 59'
RL	5	Sophie de Goede
LL	4	Courtney Holtkamp	(substituted off) 71'
TP	3	DaLeaka Menin	(substituted off) 63'
HK	2	Laura Russell (c)	(substituted off) 51'
LP	1	Olivia DeMerchant	(substituted off) 63'
Replacements:
HK	16	Gillian Boag	(substituted on) 51'
PR	17	Maude Laliberté	(substituted on) 63'
PR	18	Veronica Harrigan	(substituted on) 63'
LK	19	Jacey Grusnick	(substituted on) 59'
FL	20	Marie-Pier Fauteux	(substituted on) 71'
N8	21	Sara Svoboda	(substituted on) 59'
FH	22	Lori Josephson	(substituted on) 67'
FB	23	Alysha Corrigan	(substituted on) 63'
Coach:
(Canada) Sandro Fiorino

FB	15	Selica Winiata	(substituted off) 63'
RW	14	Renee Wickliffe
OC	13	Carla Hohepa
IC	12	Chelsea Alley
LW	11	Ayesha Leti-I'iga
FH	10	Ruahei Demant	(substituted off) 72'
SH	9	Kendra Cocksedge	(substituted off) 72'
N8	8	Pia Tapsell
OF	7	Les Elder (c)	(substituted off) 63'
BF	6	Charmaine McMenamin
RL	5	Charmaine Smith
LL	4	Eloise Blackwell	(substituted off) 67'
TP	3	Aleisha-Pearl Nelson	(substituted off) 67'
HK	2	Te Kura Ngata-Aerengamate	(substituted off) 72'
LP	1	Toka Natua	(substituted off) 59'
Replacements:
HK	16	Luka Connor	(substituted on) 72'
PR	17	Phillipa Love	(substituted on) 59'
PR	18	Leilani Perese	(substituted on) 67'
LK	19	Karli Faneva	(substituted on) 67'
FL	20	Marcelle Parkes	(substituted on) 63'
SH	21	Arihiana Marino-Tauhinu	(substituted on) 72'
FH	22	Krysten Cottrell	(substituted on) 75'
FB	23	Alena Saili	(substituted on) 63'
Coach:
(New Zealand) Glenn Moore

=== 2 July ===
Test: 1333	2 July 2019	France	19–36	Canada (1 BP)	Chula Vista Elite Athlete Training Center, San Diego, California
	14:15 PDT (UTC-7)	Try: N'Diaye 6' c Sansus 15' m Tremouliere 64' c Con: Coudert 7'; Tremouliere 65'		Try: Beukeboom 10' c Slevinsky 27' c Poulin 44' m Russell 58' c Thornborough 77' c Con: de Goede (4) 10', 28', 60', 78'; Pen: de Goede 3'	Referee: (England) Sara Cox

FB	15	Elise Pignot
RW	14	Cyrielle Banet	(substituted off) 51'
OC	13	Maëlle Filopon
IC	12	Morgane Peyronnet
LW	11	Marine Ménager
FH	10	Emma Coudert	(substituted off) 53'
SH	9	Laure Sansus	(substituted off) 46'
N8	8	Fiona Lecat	(substituted off) 46'
OF	7	Coumba Diallo
BF	6	Gaëlle Hermet (c)
RL	5	Audrey Forlani
LL	4	Safi N'Diaye	(substituted off) 71'
TP	3	Clara Joyeux	(substituted off) 46'
HK	2	Agathe Sochat	(substituted off) 53'
LP	1	Lise Arricastre
Replacements:
HK	16	Laure Touye	(substituted on) 53'
PR	17	Célia Domain
PR	18	Annaëlle Deshayes	(substituted on) 46'
LK	19	Madoussou Fall	(substituted on) 71'
FL	20	Céline Ferer	(substituted on) 46'
SH	21	Pauline Bourdon	(substituted on) 46'
FH	22	Camille Cabalou	(substituted on) 53'
FB	23	Jessy Tremouliere	(substituted on) 51'
Coach:
(France) Samuel Cherouk

FB	15	Elissa Alarie (c)
RW	14	Paige Farries
OC	13	Amanda Thornborough	(substituted off) 79'
IC	12	Alex Tessier
LW	11	Sabrina Poulin		(substituted off) 74'
FH	10	Taylor Black
SH	9	Lori Josephson	(substituted off) 53'
N8	8	Sophie de Goede
OF	7	Fabiola Forteza	(substituted off) 65'
BF	6	Janna Slevinsky
RL	5	Jacey Grusnick	(substituted off) 52'
LL	4	Tyson Beukeboom	(substituted off) 53'
TP	3	DaLeaka Menin	(substituted off) 63'
HK	2	Gillian Boag	(substituted off) 54'
LP	1	Olivia DeMerchant	(substituted off) 63'	(substituted on) 74'
Replacements:
HK	16	Ngalula Fuamba	(substituted on) 63'	(yellow card) 71' to 80 +2'
PR	17	Laura Russell	(substituted on) 54'
PR	18	Maude Laliberté	(substituted on) 63'
LK	19	Courtney Holtkamp	(substituted on) 52'
FL	20	Sara Svoboda	(substituted on) 65'
SH	21	Marie-Pier Fauteux	(substituted on) 53'
FH	22	Brianna Miller	(substituted on) 53'
FB	23	Alysha Corrigan	(substituted on) 79'
Coach:
(Canada) Sandro Fiorino

Test: 1334	2 July 2019	(1 BP) New Zealand	33–0	United States	Chula Vista Elite Athlete Training Center, San Diego, California
	17:15 PDT (UTC-7)	Try: Hohepa 7' c Ngata-Aerengamate 14' c Moors 27' m Tapsell 46' c Blackwell 64' c Con: Cocksedge (4) 8', 16', 48', 65'			Referee: (Scotland) Hollie Davidson

FB	15	Renee Wickliffe
RW	14	Natahlia Moors	(substituted off) 54'
OC	13	Carla Hohepa
IC	12	Chelsea Alley	(substituted off) 40'
LW	11	Ayesha Leti-I'iga
FH	10	Ruahei Demant
SH	9	Kendra Cocksedge	(substituted off) 65'
N8	8	Pia Tapsell
OF	7	Les Elder (c)	(substituted off) 60'
BF	6	Charmaine McMenamin
RL	5	Charmaine Smith	(substituted off) 60'
LL	4	Eloise Blackwell
TP	3	Aleisha-Pearl Nelson	(substituted off) 58'
HK	2	Te Kura Ngata-Aerengamate	(substituted off) 70'
LP	1	Phillipa Love	(substituted off) 58'
Replacements:
HK	16	Forne Burkin	(substituted on) 70'
PR	17	Toka Natua	(substituted on) 58'
PR	18	Leilani Perese	(substituted on) 58'
LK	19	Joanah Ngan-Woo	(substituted on) 60'
FL	20	Kennedy Simon	(substituted on) 60'
SH	21	Arihiana Marino-Tauhinu	(substituted on) 65'
FH	22	Kelly Brazier	(substituted on) 40'
CE	23	Theresa Fitzpatrick	(substituted on) 54'
Coach:
(New Zealand) Glenn Moore

FB	15	Bulou Mataitoga	(substituted off) 63'
RW	14	Bui Baravilala
OC	13	Amy Talei Bonte
IC	12	Alev Kelter
LW	11	Kris Thomas
FH	10	Katana Howard	(substituted off) 65'
SH	9	Ashlee Byrge	(substituted off) 66'
N8	8	Katherine Zackary (c)
OF	7	Joycelynn Taufa
BF	6	Elizabeth Cairns	(substituted off) 58'
RL	5	Alycia Washington
LL	4	Stacey Bridges	(substituted off) 60'
TP	3	Nick James
HK	2	Kate Augustyn	(substituted off) 58'
LP	1	Hope Rogers	(substituted off) 60'
Replacements:
HK	16	Catherine Benson	(substituted on) 54'
PR	17	Charli Jacoby	(substituted on) 60'
PR	18	Joanna Kitlinski	(substituted on) 58'
LK	19	Nicole Strasko	(substituted on) 58'
LK	20	Kristine Sommar	(substituted on) 60'
SH	21	Olivia Ortiz	(substituted on) 66'
CE	22	Emily Henrich	(substituted on) 63'
CE	23	Fane Hangatau	(substituted on) 65'
Coach:
(England) Rob Cain

=== 6 July ===
Test: 1335	6 July 2019	France	25–16	New Zealand	Chula Vista Elite Athlete Training Center, San Diego, California
	14:15 PDT (UTC-7)	Try: Boujard 6' m Filopon 16' c Tremouliere 61' c Con: Tremouliere (2) 16', 61'; Pen: Tremouliere (2) 11', 23'		Try: Penalty try 74'; Pen: Cocksedge (3) 20', 33', 53'	Referee: (Ireland) Joy Neville

FB	15	Jessy Tremouliere
RW	14	Caroline Boujard
OC	13	Maëlle Filopon	(substituted off) 55'	(substituted on) 64'	(substituted off) 69'
IC	12	Gabrielle Vernier	(substituted off) 69'
LW	11	Marine Ménager	(substituted off) 76'
FH	10	Morgane Peyronnet
SH	9	Pauline Bourdon	(yellow card) 73' to end'
N8	8	Gaëlle Hermet (c)	(yellow card) 74' to end'
OF	7	Coumba Diallo	(substituted off) 75'
BF	6	Céline Ferer
RL	5	Audrey Forlani	(yellow card) 33' to 44'
LL	4	Madoussou Fall	(substituted off) 65'
TP	3	Annaëlle Deshayes	(substituted off) 76'
HK	2	Caroline Thomas	(substituted off) 64'
LP	1	Lise Arricastre	(substituted off) 41'	(substituted on) 76'
Replacements:
HK	16	Agathe Sochat	(substituted on) 64'
PR	17	Célia Domain	(substituted on) 76'
PR	18	Clara Joyeux	(substituted on) 41'	(substituted off) 76'
LK	19	Fiona Lecat	(substituted on) 75'
FL	20	Emeline Gros	(substituted on) 65'
SH	21	Camille Imart	(substituted on) 69'
FH	22	Laure Sansus	(substituted on) 76'
FB	23	Elise Pignot	(substituted on) 55'	(substituted off) 64'	(substituted on) 69'
Coach:
(France) Samuel Cherouk

FB	15	Selica Winiata
RW	14	Renee Wickliffe
OC	13	Carla Hohepa
IC	12	Kelly Brazier
LW	11	Ayesha Leti-I'iga
FH	10	Ruahei Demant	(substituted off) 62'
SH	9	Kendra Cocksedge (c)	(substituted off) 80'
N8	8	Charmaine McMenamin
OF	7	Marcelle Parkes	(substituted off) 73'
BF	6	Pia Tapsell
RL	5	Charmaine Smith
LL	4	Eloise Blackwell
TP	3	Aleisha-Pearl Nelson	(substituted off) 66'
HK	2	Te Kura Ngata-Aerengamate	(substituted off) 80 +1'
LP	1	Toka Natua	(substituted off) 60'
Replacements:
HK	16	Luka Connor	(substituted on) 80 +1'
PR	17	Phillipa Love	(substituted on) 60'
PR	18	Leilani Perese	(substituted on) 66'
LK	19	Karli Faneva
FL	20	Kennedy Simon	(substituted on) 73'
SH	21	Arihiana Marino-Tauhinu	(substituted on) 80'
FH	22	Chelsea Alley	(substituted on) 62'
FB	23	Alena Saili
Coach:
(New Zealand) Glenn Moore

Test: 1336	6 July 2019	(1 BP) Canada	17–19	England	Chula Vista Elite Athlete Training Center, San Diego, California
	17:15 PDT (UTC-7)	Try: Beukeboom 24' m Farries (2) 43' c, 56' m Con: Miller 44'		Try: Penalty try 49'; Smith 52' c Hunter 74' m Con: Scarratt 53'	Referee: (Australia) Amy Perrett

FB	15	Elissa Alarie
RW	14	Paige Farries
OC	13	Alexandra Tessier
IC	12	Sara Kaljuvee	(yellow card) 74' to end'
LW	11	Alysha Corrigan
FH	10	Taylor Black
SH	9	Brianna Miller
N8	8	Sophie de Goede
OF	7	Janna Slevinsky	(substituted off) 67'
BF	6	Gabrielle Senft	(yellow card) 41' to 51'
RL	5	Jacey Grusnick	(substituted off) 47'
LL	4	Tyson Beukeboom	(substituted off) 47'
TP	3	DaLeaka Menin	(substituted off) 47'
HK	2	Laura Russell (c)
LP	1	Olivia DeMerchant	(substituted off) 47'
Replacements:
HK	16	Gillian Boag
PR	17	Maude Laliberté	(substituted on) 47'
PR	18	Veronica Harrigan	(substituted on) 47'
LK	19	Courtney Holtkamp	(substituted on) 47'
FL	20	Sara Svoboda	(substituted on) 67'
SH	21	Marie-Pier Fauteux	(substituted on) 47'
FH	22	Lori Josephson
FB	23	Anaïs Holly
Coach:
(Canada) Sandro Fiorino

FB	15	Emily Scott
RW	14	Carys Williams	(substituted off) 50'
OC	13	Emily Wood
IC	12	Amber Reed
LW	11	Kelly Smith
FH	10	Zoe Harrison	(substituted off) 50'
SH	9	Claudia MacDonald	(substituted off) 47'
N8	8	Sarah Hunter (c)
OF	7	Jo Brown	(substituted off) 50'
BF	6	Sarah Beckett
RL	5	Zoe Aldcroft
LL	4	Catherine O'Donnell	(substituted off) 50'
TP	3	Hannah Botterman	(substituted off) 50'
HK	2	Lark Davies
LP	1	Victoria Cornborough	(substituted off) 40'
Replacements:
HK	16	Heather Kerr
PR	17	Ellena Perry	(substituted on) 40'
PR	18	Chloe Edwards	(substituted on) 50'
LK	19	Abbie Scott	(substituted on) 50'	(yellow card) 60' to 71'
FL	20	Poppy Cleall	(substituted on) 50'
SH	21	Leanne Riley	(substituted on) 47'
CE	22	Emily Scarratt	(substituted on) 50'
WG	23	Lydia Thompson	(substituted on) 50'
Coach:
(England) Simon Middleton

=== 10 July ===
Test: 1337	10 July 2019	England	20–18	France (1 BP)	Chula Vista Elite Athlete Training Center, San Diego, California
	14:15 PDT (UTC-7)	Try: Smith 10' m Scarratt (2) 50' m, 69' c Con: Scarratt 70'; Pen: Scarratt 73'		Try: Banet 2' m Boujard 23' c Con: Tremouliere 24'; Pen: Tremouliere (2) 36', 40' +1	Referee: (South Africa) Aimee Barrett-Theron

FB	15	Sarah McKenna
RW	14	Lydia Thompson
OC	13	Emily Scarratt
IC	12	Amber Reed	(substituted off) 63'
LW	11	Kelly Smith	(substituted off) 63'
FH	10	Zoe Harrison
SH	9	Leanne Riley
N8	8	Sarah Hunter (c)
OF	7	Marlie Packer	(substituted off) 66'
BF	6	Poppy Cleall
RL	5	Abbie Scott
LL	4	Catherine O'Donnell	(substituted off) 63'
TP	3	Sarah Bern	(substituted off) 56'
HK	2	Heather Kerr	(substituted off) 47'
LP	1	Victoria Cornborough	(substituted off) 47'
Replacements:
HK	16	Lark Davies	(substituted on) 47'
PR	17	Ellena Perry	(substituted on) 47'
PR	18	Hannah Botterman	(substituted on) 56'
LK	19	Zoe Aldcroft	(substituted on) 63'
FL	20	Sarah Beckett	(substituted on) 66'
SH	21	Claudia MacDonald
FH	22	Emily Scott	(substituted on) 63'
CE	23	Emily Wood	(substituted on) 63'
Coach:
(England) Simon Middleton

FB	15	Jessy Tremouliere
RW	14	Caroline Boujard
OC	13	Elise Pignot	(substituted off) 54'
IC	12	Camille Cabalou
LW	11	Cyrielle Banet	(substituted off) 56'
FH	10	Camille Imart
SH	9	Pauline Bourdon	(substituted off) 75'
N8	8	Gaëlle Hermet (c)
OF	7	Coumba Diallo
BF	6	Brandy Cazorla	(substituted off) 63'
RL	5	Audrey Forlani
LL	4	Céline Ferer	(substituted off) 63'
TP	3	Clara Joyeux	(substituted off) 63'	(substituted on) 78'
HK	2	Laure Touye	(substituted off) 64'
LP	1	Annaëlle Deshayes
Replacements:
HK	16	Agathe Sochat	(substituted on) 64'
PR	17	Caroline Thomas	(substituted on) 63'	(substituted off) 78'
PR	18	Célia Domain
LK	19	Madoussou Fall	(substituted on) 63'
FL	20	Axelle Berthouieu	(substituted on) 63'
SH	21	Morgane Peyronnet	(substituted on) 54'
FH	22	Laure Sansus	(substituted on) 75'
WG	23	Marine Ménager	(substituted on) 56'
Coach:
(France) Samuel Cherouk

Test: 1338	10 July 2019	(1 BP) Canada	18–20	United States	Chula Vista Elite Athlete Training Center, San Diego, California
	17:15 PDT (UTC-7)	Try: DeMerchant (2) 5' c, 15' m Con: de Goede 6'; Pen: de Goede (2) 24', 30'		Try: Henreich 26' m Kelter 62' c Thomas 72' m Con: Kelter 62'; Pen: Kelter 13'	Referee: (New Zealand) Rebecca Mahoney

FB	15	Elissa Alarie (c)
RW	14	Irene Patrinos
OC	13	Anaïs Holly	(substituted off) 50'
IC	12	Amanda Thornborough	(substituted off) 71'
LW	11	Sabrina Poulin
FH	10	Taylor Black
SH	9	Lori Josephson	(substituted off) 55'
N8	8	Sophie de Goede	(substituted off) 55'
OF	7	Janna Slevinsky
BF	6	Fabiola Forteza
RL	5	Courtney Holtkamp	(substituted off) 49'
LL	4	Tyson Beukeboom
TP	3	DaLeaka Menin
HK	2	Gillian Boag	(substituted off) 60'
LP	1	Olivia DeMerchant	(substituted off) 74'
Replacements:
HK	16	Veronica Harrigan	(substituted on) 60'
PR	17	Maude Laliberté
PR	18	Ngalula Fuamba	(substituted on) 74'
LK	19	Jacey Grusnick	(substituted on) 49'
FL	20	Gabrielle Senft	(substituted on) 55'
SH	21	Brianna Miller	(substituted on) 55'
FH	22	Alexandra Tessier	(substituted on) 50'
WG	23	Paige Farries	(substituted on) 71'
Coach:
(Canada) Sandro Fiorino

FB	15	Alev Kelter
RW	14	Kris Thomas
OC	13	Emily Henreich
IC	12	Fane Haungatau	(substituted off) 43'
LW	11	Jennine Duncan
FH	10	Gabriella Cantorna	(substituted off) 63'
SH	9	Ashlee Byrge	(substituted off) 51'
N8	8	Katherine Zackary (c)
OF	7	Elizabeth Cairns	(substituted off) 63'
BF	6	Rachel Johnson
RL	5	Alycia Washington	(substituted off) 58'
LL	4	Kristine Sommar
TP	3	Charli Jacoby	(substituted off) 60'
HK	2	Joanna Kitlinski	(substituted off) 61'
LP	1	Catherine Benson	(substituted off) 51'
Replacements:
HK	16	Hope Rogers	(substituted on) 51'
PR	17	Nick James	(substituted on) 61'
PR	18	Asinate Serevi	(substituted on) 60'
LK	19	Stacey Bridges	(substituted on) 58'
FL	20	Olivia Ortiz	(substituted on) 63'
WG	21	Amy Talei Bonte	(substituted on) 51'
FH	22	Katana Howard	(substituted on) 63'
CE	23	Bulou Mataitoga	(substituted on) 43'
Coach:
(England) Rob Cain

=== 14 July ===
Test: 1342	14 July 2019	New Zealand	28–13	England	Torero Stadium, San Diego, California
	13:00 PDT (UTC-7)	Try: Wickliffe (3) 26' m, 30' c, 65' c Con: Cocksedge (2) 31', 66'; Pen: Cocksedge (3) 8', 60', 72'		Try: Scarratt 12' c Con: Scarratt 13'; Pen: Scarratt 5'	Referee: (Australia) Amy Perrett

FB	15	Kelly Brazier
RW	14	Renee Wickliffe	(substituted off) 74'
OC	13	Carla Hohepa
IC	12	Chelsea Alley	(substituted off) 63'
LW	11	Ayesha Leti-I'iga
FH	10	Ruahei Demant
SH	9	Kendra Cocksedge	(substituted off) 74'
N8	8	Charmaine McMenamin
OF	7	Les Elder (c)	(substituted off) 77'
BF	6	Pia Tapsell	(substituted off) 6'	(substituted on) 15'	(substituted off) 51'	(substituted on) 61'
RL	5	Charmaine Smith
LL	4	Eloise Blackwell	(substituted off) 76'
TP	3	Aleisha-Pearl Nelson	(substituted off) 74'			(substituted on) 78'
HK	2	Te Kura Ngata-Aerengamate	(yellow card) 50' to 61'				(substituted off) 80 +2'
LP	1	Toka Natua	(yellow card) 4' to 15'		(substituted off) 67'
Replacements:
HK	16	Luka Connor			(substituted on) 51'	(substituted off) 61'	(substituted on) 80 +2'
PR	17	Phillipa Love	(substituted on) 6'	(substituted off) 15'	(substituted on) 67'	(substituted off) 78'
PR	18	Leilani Perese	(substituted on) 74'
LK	19	Joanah Ngan-Woo	(substituted on) 76'
FL	20	Marcelle Parkes	(substituted on) 77'
SH	21	Arihiana Marino-Tauhinu	(substituted on) 74'
CE	22	Theresa Fitzpatrick	(substituted on) 63'
FB	23	Alena Saili	(substituted on) 74'
Coach:
(New Zealand) Glenn Moore

FB	15	Sarah McKenna
RW	14	Lydia Thompson
OC	13	Emily Scarratt
IC	12	Emily Scott
LW	11	Claudia MacDonald
FH	10	Zoe Harrison	(substituted off) 56'
SH	9	Leanne Riley	(substituted off) 74'
N8	8	Sarah Hunter (c)
OF	7	Marlie Packer	(substituted off) 67'
BF	6	Poppy Cleall	(substituted off) 78'
RL	5	Abbie Scott
LL	4	Catherine O'Donnell	(substituted off) 56'
TP	3	Sarah Bern	(substituted off) 56'	(substituted on) 80 +2'
HK	2	Lark Davies	(substituted off) 67'
LP	1	Victoria Cornborough	(substituted off) 56'
Replacements:
HK	16	Heather Kerr	(substituted on) 67'
PR	17	Ellena Perry	(substituted on) 56'
PR	18	Hannah Botterman	(substituted on) 56'	(yellow card) 80 +1' to end'
LK	19	Zoe Aldcroft	(substituted on) 56'
FL	20	Sarah Beckett	(substituted on) 67'
FH	21	Amber Reed	(substituted on) 56'
CE	22	Emily Wood	(substituted on) 78'	(substituted off) 80 +2'
WG	23	Kelly Smith	(substituted on) 74'
Coach:
(England) Simon Middleton

Test: 1343	14 July 2019	(1 BP) France	53–14	United States	Torero Stadium, San Diego, California
	16:00 PDT (UTC-7)	Try: Fall 28' c Gros 37' c Ferer 44' c Sansus (2) 50' c, 75' c Banet 68' c M. Ménager 70' m Con: Tremouliere (4) 30', 38', 45', 51'; Coudert (2) 69', 76'; Pen: Tremouliere (2) 11', 25'		Try: Kelter 65' c Jacoby 80' c Con: Kelter (2) 66', 80' +1	Referee: (South Africa) Aimee Barrett-Theron

FB	15	Jessy Tremouliere	(substituted off) 61'
RW	14	Caroline Boujard
OC	13	Camille Cabalou
IC	12	Gabrielle Vernier
LW	11	Marine Ménager
FH	10	Morgane Peyronnet	(substituted off) 54'
SH	9	Pauline Bourdon	(substituted off) 40'
N8	8	Emeline Gros
OF	7	Céline Ferer	(substituted off) 54'
BF	6	Gaëlle Hermet (c)	(substituted off) 63'
RL	5	Audrey Forlani
LL	4	Madoussou Fall		(substituted off) 71'
TP	3	Clara Joyeux	(substituted off) 71'
HK	2	Caroline Thomas	(substituted off) 40'	(substituted on) 71'
LP	1	Lise Arricastre	(substituted off) 40'	(substituted on) 63'
Replacements:
HK	16	Agathe Sochat	(substituted on) 71'
PR	17	Laure Touye	(substituted on) 40'
PR	18	Annaëlle Deshayes	(substituted on) 40'	(substituted off) 63'
LK	19	Fiona Lecat	(substituted on) 54'
FL	20	Axelle Berthoumieu	(substituted on) 63'
SH	21	Laure Sansus	(substituted on) 40'
FH	22	Emma Coudert	(substituted on) 54'
WG	23	Cyrielle Banet	(substituted on) 61'
Coach:
(France) Samuel Cherouk

FB	15	Alev Kelter
RW	14	Neariah Persinger
OC	13	Emily Henreich
IC	12	Amy Talei Bonte	(substituted off) 19'	(substituted on) 30'
LW	11	Jennine Duncan
FH	10	Gabriella Cantorna	(substituted off) 54'
SH	9	Ashlee Byrge	(substituted off) 40'
N8	8	Katherine Zackary (c)	(substituted off) 69'
OF	7	Joycelynn Taufa	(substituted off) 52'
BF	6	Rachel Johnson
RL	5	Stacey Bridges
LL	4	Nicole Strasko
TP	3	Nick James	(substituted off) 52'
HK	2	Joanna Kitlinski	(substituted off) 52'
LP	1	Hope Rogers	(substituted off) 52'
Replacements:
HK	16	Catherine Benson	(substituted on) 52'
PR	17	Charli Jacoby	(substituted on) 52'
PR	18	Kate Augustyn	(substituted on) 52'
LK	19	Asinate Serevi	(substituted on) 69'
FL	20	Kristine Sommar	(substituted on) 52'
SH	21	Olivia Ortiz	(substituted on) 40'
WG	22	Bui Baravilala	(substituted on) 54'
WG	23	Kris Thomas	(substituted on) 19'	(substituted off) 30'
Coach:
(England) Rob Cain

== See also ==
- Women's international rugby

Preceded by Super Series 2016	Super Series; 2019; New Zealand	Succeeded by
