= 2017 Laurie O'Reilly Cup =

New Zealand	Australia
(New Zealand)	(Australia)
44	17
- Date: 13 June 2017
- Venue: Rugby Park, Christchurch
- Referee: (Hong Kong) Tim Baker

The 2017 Laurie O'Reilly Cup was the tenth edition of the competition and was held on 13 June at Christchurch. It was the first time the Black Ferns and the Wallaroos had played in the South Island since 1997. The match was part of the June International series that was hosted by New Zealand who played against Australia, Canada, and England. The June tests was to help provide quality matches as the teams prepared for the upcoming Rugby World Cup in Ireland.

New Zealand retained the O'Reilly Cup after thrashing Australia 44–17.

== Match ==
Test: 1209	New Zealand	44–17	Australia
	Try: Portia Woodman (2); Selica Winiata (2); Fiao'o Fa'amausili; Toka Natua; Kendra Cocksedge; Charmaine Smith; Con: Kendra Cocksedge (2)	Report	Try: Cobie-Jane Morgan; Cheyenne Campbell; Victoria Latu; Con: Fenella Hake

FB	15	Selica Winiata
RW	14	Honey Hireme
OC	13	Stacey Fluhler
IC	12	Theresa Fitzpatrick
LW	11	Portia Woodman
FH	10	Kelly Brazier
SH	9	Kendra Cocksedge
N8	8	Charmaine McMenamin
BF	7	Sarah Hirini
OF	6	Charmaine Smith
RL	5	Becky Wood
LL	4	Eloise Blackwell
TP	3	Aldora Itunu
HK	2	Fiao'o Fa'amausili
LP	1	Toka Natua
Replacements:
HK	16	Te Kura Ngata-Aerengamate
PR	17	Sosoli Talawadua
PR	18	Aleisha-Pearl Nelson
FL	19	Leslie-Ann Elder
FL	20	Linda Itunu
SH	21	Kristina Sue
FH	22	Victoria Subritzky-Nafatali
CE	23	Chelsea Semple
Coach:
(New Zealand) Glenn Moore

FB	15	Ashleigh Hewson
RW	14	Cobie-Jane Morgan
OC	13	Sharni Williams
IC	12	Kayla Sauvao
LW	11	Samantha Treherne
FH	10	Fenella Hake
SH	9	Katrina Barker
N8	8	Victoria Latu
BF	7	Vesinia Schaaf-Taufa
OF	6	Chloe Butler
RL	5	Alexandra Sulusi
LL	4	Millie Boyle
TP	3	Caroline Fairs
HK	2	Cheyenne Campbell
LP	1	Hana Ngaha
Replacements:
HK	16	Liz Patu
PR	17	Violeta Tupuola
PR	18	Hilisha Samoa
LK	19	Alisha Hewett
FL	20	Kiri Lingman
BK	21	Ashleigh Timoko
FH	22	Sarah Riordan
BK	23	Nareta Marsters
Coach:
(Australia) Paul Verrell
