= Olivia Ward-Duin =

NZ international rugby union player

- Born: 23 December 1993 (age 32) Hastings, New Zealand
- Height: 1.83 m (6 ft 0 in)
- Weight: 105 kg (231 lb)

Rugby union career
- Position: Prop
Provincial / State sides
Years	Team	Apps	(Points)
2016	Auckland	1	(0)
2016–2021	North Harbour	31	(15)
Super Rugby
Years	Team	Apps	(Points)
2022	Blues Women	2	(0)
International career
Years	Team	Apps	(Points)
2019	New Zealand	2	(0)

Olivia Ward-Duin (born 23 January 1993) is a New Zealand rugby union player.

== Biography ==
Ward-Duin replaced Aldora Itunu in the Black Ferns 30-player squad to the 2019 Super Series in San Diego, but she did not feature at the tournament.

Ward-Duin was named in a 28-player squad for the 2019 Laurie O'Reilly Cup. She made her international debut for New Zealand on 10 August 2019 against Australia at Perth. She also featured in the second test in Auckland.

After making her Black Ferns debut Ward-Duin was named as captain of her North Harbour side for the 2019 Farah Palmer Cup season.

Ward-Duin featured for the New Zealand Barbarians against the Black Ferns in November 2020. She was named in the Possibles side that faced the Probables in the Black Ferns trial match.

On 3 November 2021, Ward-Duin was named in the Blues Women's squad for the inaugural Super Rugby Aupiki competition. She featured for the Blues in their opening game against Matatū, they won 21–10. She came off the bench in their 0–35 loss to Chiefs Manawa in the final round.
