= Glenn Moore =

Glenn Moore may refer to:

- Glenn Moore (comedian) (born 1989), British comedian
- Glenn Moore (softball), American softball coach
- Glenn Moore (rugby union) (born 1959), New Zealand rugby union player
- Glen Moore (born 1941), American musician

== See also ==
- Glen More, aka Great Glen, Scotland
