= Asinate Serevi =

Fijian rugby union player

- Born: 16 April 1995 (age 31) Suva, Fiji
- Height: 5 ft 11 in (180 cm)
- Weight: 190 lb (86 kg)

Rugby union career
- Position: Forward
Super Rugby
| Years | Team | Apps | (Points) |
| 2022–Present | Fijian Drua | | (0) |
International career
| Years | Team | Apps | (Points) |
| 2016–2019 | United States | | (0) |
| 2022– | Fiji | 30 | (5) |

Asinate Serevi (born 16 April 1995) is a Fijian rugby union player. She represented the United States in international rugby before switching to play for Fiji in 2022. She competed for Fiji in their Rugby World Cup debut in 2022.

== Rugby career ==
=== USA Eagles ===
Serevi made her debut for the United States against Canada at the 2016 Women's Rugby Super Series. She graduated with a degree in Law and Justice from the Central Washington University. She is the daughter of Fiji sevens legend, Waisale Serevi.

Serevi featured for the Eagles at the 2019 Women's Rugby Super Series.

=== Fijiana ===
Serevi was named in the Fijiana squad for two test matches against Japan and Australia in 2022. In September she played in a warm up match against Canada. She was also named in the Fijiana squad for the delayed 2021 Rugby World Cup.

Serevi made the Fijiana's 23-member squad that faced the Wallaroos on 20 May 2023, her side lost 22–5.

On 9 August 2025, she was named in the Fijiana side to the Women's Rugby World Cup in England.
