= Samantha Treherne =

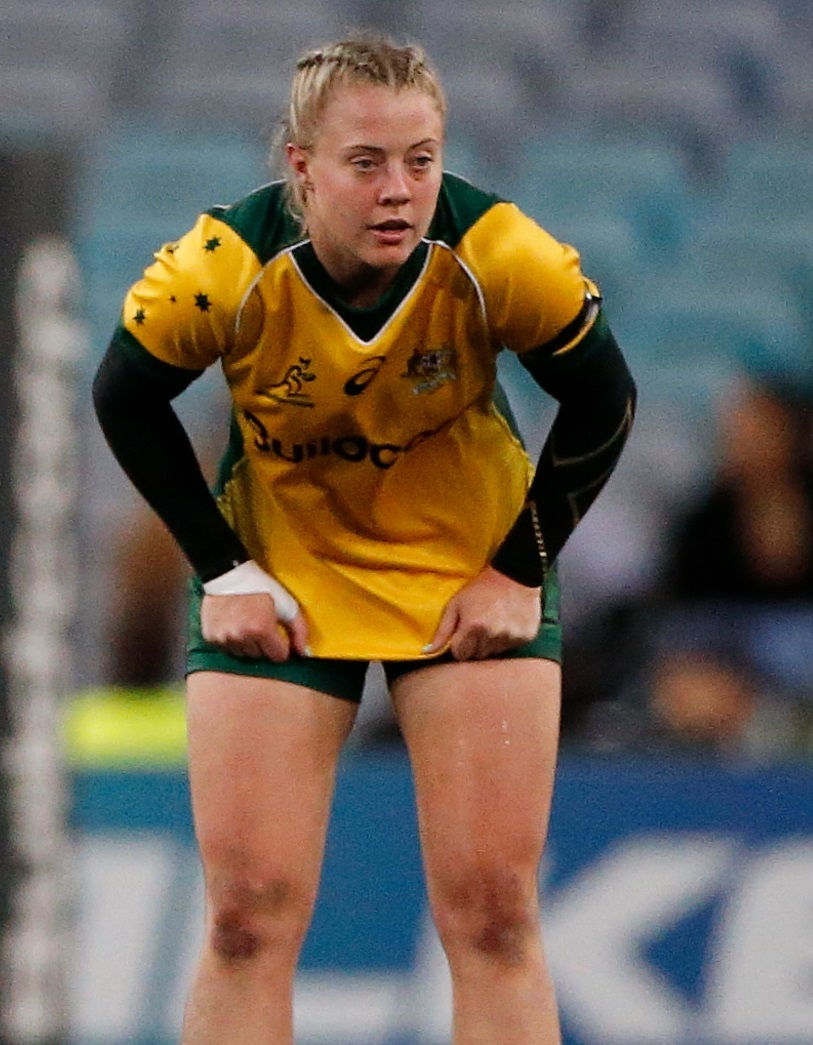
- Treherne in a 2018 match against New Zealand.
- Full name: Samantha May Treherne
- Born: 12 May 1993 (age 33) Melbourne, Victoria, Australia
- School: Footscray High School

Rugby union career
- Position(s): Fullback, Wing
- Current team: Western Force
Youth career
- –2017: Footscray
Amateur team(s)
Years	Team	Apps	(Points)
2017	Sunnybank		
Super Rugby
Years	Team	Apps	(Points)
2018–2019	Queensland Reds	7	(22)
2024	Melbourne Rebels	3	(0)
2025–	Western Force	1	(5)
- Correct as of 1 March 2025
International career
Years	Team	Apps	(Points)
2017–2019	Australia	14	(23)
National sevens team
Years	Team		Comps
2019–2020	Australia		

Samantha May Treherne (born 12 May 1993) is an Australian rugby union player. She currently plays for the Western Force in the Australian Super Rugby Women's competition as a fullback. Treherne has been deployed as a winger and has also played rugby sevens on the World Rugby Women's Sevens Series. In 2018, Treherne was described as "arguably the most versatile [women's] rugby player in Australia" by Rugby.com.au.

== Early life and career ==
Treherne was born in the capital city of the Australian state of Victoria: Melbourne. Treherne's family resided in the cities western suburbs, specifically Maidstone. Her parents met at the Footscray Rugby Club which was a regular destination for her as a child where her father became the president of the club. In 2017 Treherne moved from Melbourne to Brisbane, Queensland to link-up with then-Australia women's rugby team assistant Moana Virtue at Sunnybank.

=== Super Rugby ===
In the inaugural Super Rugby W season (2018), Treherne started in all four regular season games at fullback for the Queensland Reds, and played in the Grand Final defeat to the New South Wales Waratahs. Treherne played in two of Queensland's matches in the following season (2019), having signed to play rugby sevens with the Australia women's sevens team in January.

Treherne to domestic rugby union for the 2024 Super Rugby Women's season with the Melbourne Rebels. She played two games at fullback and one game on the wing. The Melbourne Rebels finished fifth of six teams, failing to make the finals series. The team was axed from the competition later in the year.

Treherne transferred to the Perth-based Western Force ahead of the 2025 season, and was the only internationally capped outside back in the team when the season kicked off in February 2025. In the first round of the season Treherne was named on the bench for the Western Force. Subbed on in the 35th minute of the game for winger Brooklyn Teki-Joyce, Treherne scored a try in the 79th minute of the match. The Western Force drew with the ACT Brumbies 29–29.

=== International career ===
Treherne made her international debut for Australia on 9 June 2017 against England in the International Women's Rugby Series at the Jerry Collins Stadium in Porirua, New Zealand. Australia lost 10–53. Treherne played in the following two pre-Women's Rugby World Cup (WRWC) matches for 2017, including one in the 2017 Laurie O'Reilly Cup against New Zealand. Treherne started at fullback in every match at the 2017 Women's Rugby World Cup for Australia. Although Treherne had been a goalkicker at numerous points in the tournament, all points she scored in the 2017 WRWC were in Australia's Pool stage match against Japan, scoring two tries and two conversions in a 29–15 victory. Ultimately Australia finished sixth in the tournament. For the rest of 2018–2019, Treherne played in the 2018 and 2019 Laurie O'Reilly Cup fixtures, and the 2019 Japan tour of Australia.

==== International tries ====
Try	Opponent	Location	Venue	Competition	Date	Result		Ref.
1	Japan	Dublin (Republic of Ireland)	Billings Park UCD	2017 Women's Rugby World Cup	17 August 2017	Win	29–15	
2	Japan	Dublin (Republic of Ireland)	Billings Park UCD	2017 Women's Rugby World Cup	17 August 2017	Win	29–15	
3	Japan	Newcastle, New South Wales (Australia)	Newcastle No. 2 Sports Ground	2019 Japan tour of Australia	13 July 2019	Win	34–5	
