= Giada Franco =

Italian rugby union player

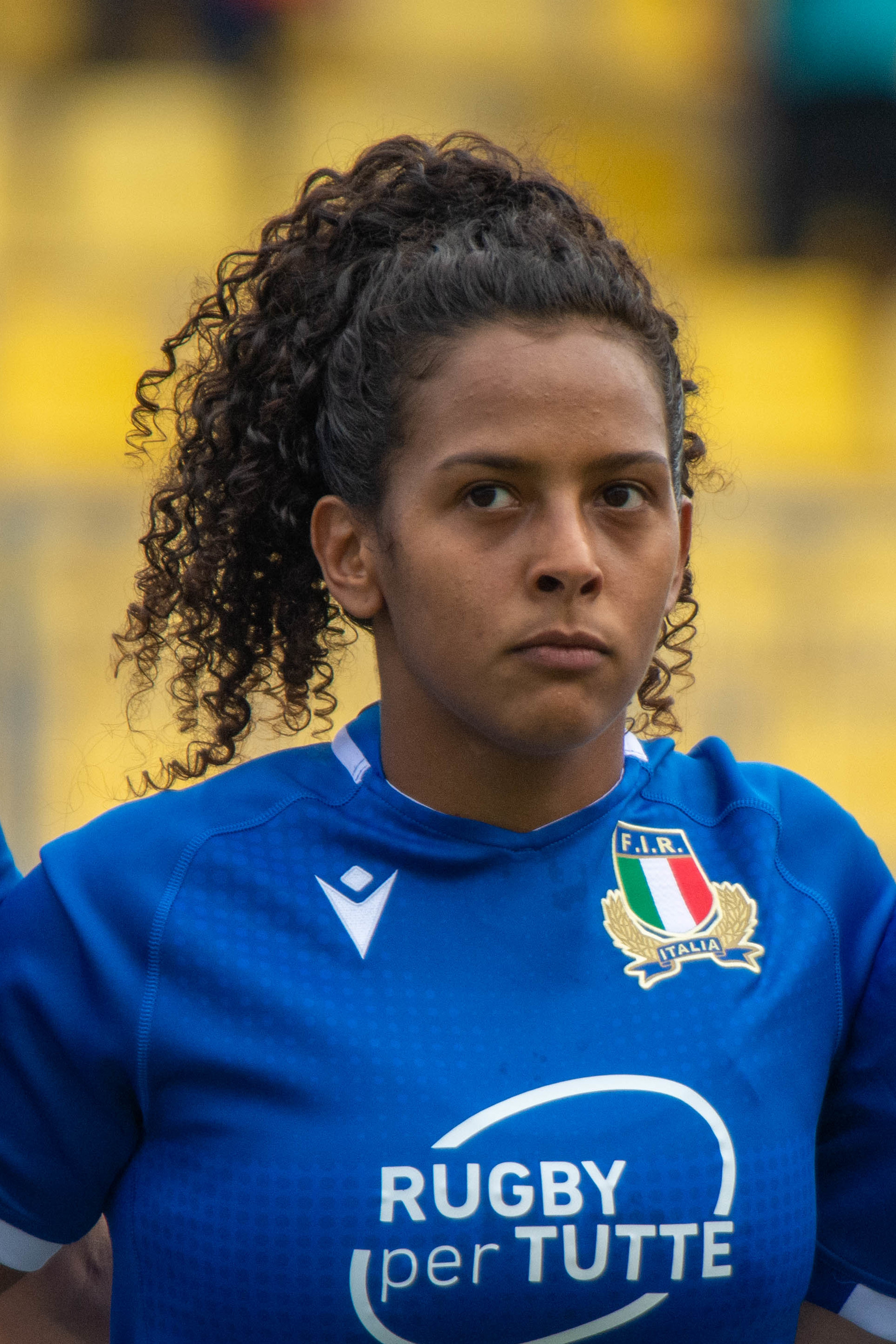
- Franco in 2021
- Born: 11 July 1996 (age 30) Naples, Italy
- Height: 1.71 m (5 ft 7 in)
- Weight: 80 kg (176 lb)

Rugby union career
- Position: Flanker
- Current team: Montpellier
Senior career
Years	Team	Apps	(Points)
2014–16	Benevento		(0)
2016–19	Rugby Colorno		(0)
2019–20	Harlequins		(0)
2020–2025	Rugby Colorno		(0)
2025–	Montpellier		
International career
Years	Team	Apps	(Points)
2018–	Italy	33	(35)
- Correct as of 24 April 2025

Giada Franco (born 11 July 1996) is an Italian rugby union player. She plays Flanker for Rugby Colorno. She is a member of the Italy women's national rugby union team. She competed at the 2021 Rugby World Cup.

== Rugby career ==
Franco competed for Italy at the 2018 Women's Six Nations Championship. In 2019, she played for Harlequins and also competed in the Six Nations Championship.

She also featured at the 2020, 2021, and 2022 Women's Six Nations tournament's. She was subsequently selected in Italy's squad for the postponed 2021 Rugby World Cup in New Zealand, which was held in 2022.

She was named in the Italian side for the 2025 Six Nations competition.
