= Women's Rugby Super Series =

International rugby union competition

- Most recent season or competition: 2019 Women's Rugby Super Series
- Sport: Rugby union
- Founded: 2015
- Folded: 2019
- No. of teams: 5
- Country: Canada; England; France; New Zealand; United States
- Last champion: New Zealand (2019)
- Most titles: New Zealand (2 titles)

The Women's Rugby Super Series is an international rugby union tournament that features the top-ranked women's teams in the world. The Super Series succeeded the Women's Nations Cup in 2015. The tournament began with four teams in 2015 and was played as a round-robin. The number of teams increased to five in 2019. New Zealand won the inaugural tournament.

== Results ==
Year	Winner	Runner-up	Teams
2015	New Zealand	England	4
2016	Canada	England	4
2017	England	New Zealand	4
2019	New Zealand	England	5

=== Team records ===
Team	Winner	Runners-up	3rd	4th	5th
New Zealand	2 (2015, 2019)	1 (2017)			
Canada	1 (2016)		1 (2017)	2 (2015, 2019)	
England	1 (2017)	3 (2015, 2016, 2019)			
France			2 (2016, 2019)		
United States			1 (2015)	1 (2016)	1 (2019)
Australia				1 (2017)	

== See also ==
- Women's international rugby - includes all women's international match results
