= Michelle Milward =

Australia international rugby union player (born 1986)

- Born: 10 January 1986 (age 40)
- Height: 180 cm (5 ft 11 in)
- Weight: 73 kg (161 lb; 11 st 7 lb)

Rugby union career
- Position: Lock
Super Rugby
Years	Team	Apps	(Points)
2018–	ACT Brumbies		
International career
Years	Team	Apps	(Points)
2014–	Australia		

Michelle "Shellie" Milward (born 10 January 1986) is an Australian rugby union player. She competed for Australia at the 2014 Women's Rugby World Cup. She played for the ACT Brumbies in the Super W competition.

== Rugby career ==
Milward earned her first call up to the Wallaroos for the tri-series against New Zealand and Canada in 2014. She eventually made her international debut against Canada in her sides 22–0 loss in the second and final match of the series.

She was named in the Wallaroos squad to the 2014 Women's Rugby World Cup in France.

In 2018, Milward captained the ACT Brumbies and also scored three tries for the team in the inaugural Super W season. She was selected in the Australian side for the Laurie O'Reilly Cup. She had been making the Wallaroos squad every year since the 2014 World Cup but never got to play before her selection.

She led the Brumbies again in 2019 and started in all five of their games. She was called into the Wallaroos side for the Laurie O'Reilly Cup. She was named as a reserve in the second test match against the Black Ferns.

A shoulder injury ruled her out for the 2020 Super W season. In 2022, she was part of the Brumbies squad in their fifth Super W season.

== Personal life ==
Outside of rugby she worked as a corrections officer in Canberra.
