= Sara Parsons =

American rugby union player

- Born: October 23, 1991 (age 35)
- Height: 1.75 m (5 ft 9 in)
- Weight: 85 kg (187 lb; 13 st 5 lb)

Rugby union career
- Position: Loose forward
Amateur team(s)
Years	Team	Apps	(Points)
- Northern Virginia Women's RFC
- Scion Sirens
- Austin Valkyries
International career
Years	Team	Apps	(Points)
2017	United States	7	

Sara Parsons (born October 23, 1991) is an American rugby union player. She made her debut for the United States in 2017. She was named in the Eagles 2017 Women's Rugby World Cup squad. Parsons was named player of the match in the USA’s 24–12 victory over Italy in pool play at the 2017 World Cup, allowing the United States to advance to the semifinals.

She was included in the Eagles team to the 2015 Women's Rugby Super Series in Canada.

== Biography ==
Parsons played softball at the University of Nevada, Reno until her senior year when she switched to rugby. She attended Churchill County High School. She is the niece of NFL player Harvey Dahl. She participated in several sports in high school including soccer, basketball, volleyball and golf.
