= Karli Faneva =

- Born: 20 May 1998 (age 28) Taumarunui
- Height: 1.76 m (5 ft 9 in)
- Weight: 92 kg (203 lb)

Rugby union career
- Position: Lock
Provincial / State sides
Years	Team	Apps	(Points)
2016–2018	Waikato	11	(25)
2019–Present	Bay of Plenty Volcanix	18	(25)
International career
Years	Team	Apps	(Points)
2019–	New Zealand	2	(0)

Karli Faneva (born 20 May 1998) is a New Zealand rugby union player. She made her international debut for New Zealand in 2019.

== Rugby career ==
Faneva debuted for Waikato against Bay of Plenty in the 2016 Farah Palmer Cup season.

In 2019 she played for the Bay of Plenty and was one of 29 players who were offered a Black Ferns contract that year. She made her international debut for New Zealand against Canada in the 2019 Women's Rugby Super Series in San Diego. She then earned her second cap in the match against France in round three of the Super Series.

She was named in Bay of Plenty's squad for the 2021 Farah Palmer Cup season. She was named in the Chiefs Manawa side that faced Matatū in a pre-season match ahead of the inaugural season of Super Rugby Aupiki.

In 2023, she scored a try for King Country in the final of the inaugural North Island Heartland Series. Her side defeated Whanganui 19–14. She featured for the Bay of Plenty in the 2024 Farah Palmer Cup season.
