= Pia Tapsell =

NZ International rugby union & league player (born 1998)

- Born: 2 August 1998 (age 28) Melbourne, Victoria, Australia
- Height: 1.78 m (5 ft 10 in)
- Weight: 86 kg (13 st 8 lb)

Rugby union career
- Position: Loose forward
Provincial / State sides
Years	Team	Apps	(Points)
2016–2020	North Harbour	24	(50)
2020–2022	Bay of Plenty Volcanix	11	(10)
Super Rugby
Years	Team	Apps	(Points)
2021–2022	Chiefs Manawa	4	(0)
2025	Western Force		(0)
International career
Years	Team	Apps	(Points)
2019–2020	New Zealand	6	(5)
- Rugby league career

Playing information
- Position: Prop, Lock
Club
Years	Team	Pld	T	G	FG	P
2024–25	Cronulla-Sutherland Sharks	0	0	0	0	0
2025	St. George Illawarra Dragons	5	0	0	0	0
	Total	5	0	0	0	0
- As of 13 November 2026

Pia Tapsell (born 2 August 1998) is a New Zealand former rugby union & current rugby league player. She played as a Loose forward for the Black Ferns and for Chiefs Manawa in the Super Rugby Aupiki competition. She played for the Western Force Women in the Super Rugby Women's competition.

== Background ==
Tapsell was born in Melbourne, Australia due to her parents being posted there by the Royal New Zealand Navy, but was raised in New Zealand as Ngāti Whakauae and Te Arawa iwi.

== Rugby career ==
Tapsell made her test debut for New Zealand against Canada at the 2019 Women's Rugby Super Series on 28 June at San Diego. She started in all of the Black Ferns six test matches of 2019. She later appeared for the New Zealand Development XV in Fiji for the Oceania Rugby Women's Championship.

She played for the Possibles in a Black Ferns trial match in 2020 and then featured for the Black Ferns against the New Zealand Barbarians. She previously played for North Harbour before representing Bay of Plenty at the 2020 Farah Palmer Cup.

In 2021 she was named in the Chiefs squad for their historic clash with the Blues. It was the first-ever women's Super Rugby match to be played in New Zealand. Later that year she signed a contract with the Chiefs for the inaugural season of Super Rugby Aupiki.

Tapsell was ruled out for the 2023 Super Rugby Aupiki season due to an ACL injury. In 2025, she joined the Western Force Women in the Super Rugby Women's competition.

== Rugby league ==
=== Cronulla-Sutherland Sharks Women ===
On 6 February 2024 it was reported that she had signed for Cronulla-Sutherland Sharks in the NRLW

=== St. George Illawarra Dragons Women ===
On 5th July 2025 Pia made her NRLW debut for St. George Illawarra Dragons in the NRLW in Round 1 against the Canberra Raiders at GIO Stadium. The Dragons won the game 36-14.
