= Carla Hohepa =

NZ international rugby union player

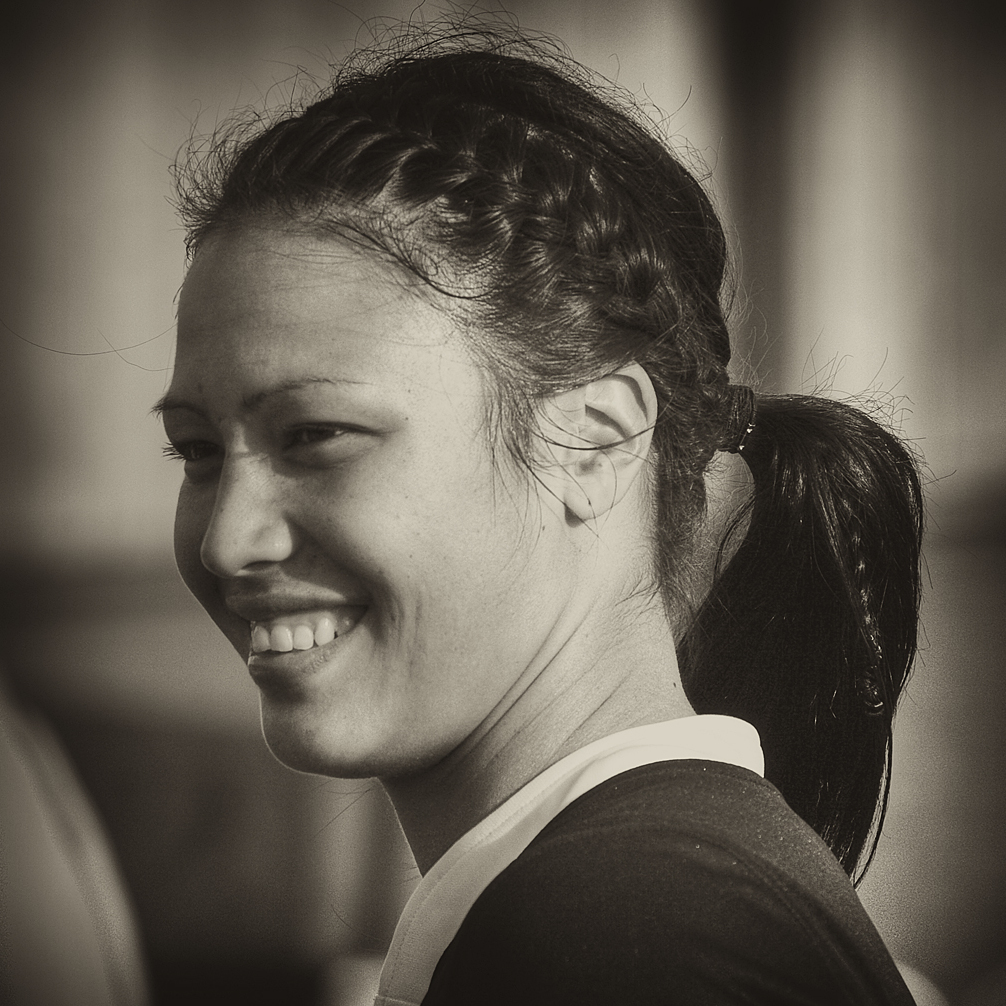
- Hohepa taken after New Zealand beat Australia 32 - 5 in August 2010
- Born: 27 July 1985 (age 41) Te Awamutu, Waikato, New Zealand
- Height: 1.75 m (5 ft 9 in)
- Weight: 71 kg (11 st 3 lb; 157 lb)
- School: Te Awamutu College; Otago Polytechnic
- University: University of Otago College of Education
- Notable relative: Chyna Hohepa (sister)
- Occupation: Primary school teacher

Rugby union career
- Position: Wing
Amateur team(s)
Years	Team	Apps	(Points)
2005–2010	Alhambra Union RFC		(0)
Provincial / State sides
Years	Team	Apps	(Points)
2006–2010	Otago Spirit	21	(125)
2020–2024	Waikato	20	(30)
Super Rugby
Years	Team	Apps	(Points)
2022–2023	Chiefs Manawa	8	(5)
International career
Years	Team	Apps	(Points)
2007–Present	New Zealand	28	(95)
National sevens team
Years	Team		Comps
2013–2015	New Zealand 7s		
Medal record
Women's rugby union
Representing New Zealand
Women's Rugby World Cup
Gold medal – first place	2010 England	Team competition
Gold medal – first place	2017 Ireland	Team competition
Sevens World Cup
Silver medal – second place	2009 Dubai	Team competition

Carla Hohepa (born 27 July 1985) is a New Zealand rugby union player who plays as a wing for New Zealand, Otago Spirit and Alhambra Union. She was a member of the Black Ferns Champion squads that won the 2010 and 2017 Rugby World Cups.

== Rugby career ==
On 16 October 2007 she made her international debut with New Zealand at Cooks Gardens in Whanganui and scoring two tries against Australia. She proved herself to be an emerging player with another three tries in the second win over the Wallaroos a few days after (29–12 at Trust Porirua Park near Wellington.

Hohepa was included in the squad for the 2010 World Cup and became one of the stars of the tournament with her pace, skill-set and vision resulting in seven tries (including a hat-trick in the opening match and some other tries against England, France and Australia).

Since 2011 she has been in Japan with her partner Karne Hesketh, a professional rugby player who plays wing for Fukuoka Sanix Blues.

She was named in the squad for the 2017 Women's Rugby World Cup. She was part of the winning team of the 2019 Women's Rugby Super Series.

In 2022 Hohepa was initially named in the Black Ferns squad for the Pacific Four Series but was ruled out due to injury.
