= Catherine O'Donnell =

England international rugby union player

Cath O'Donnell
- Full name: Catherine Mary O'Donnell
- Born: 13 June 1996 (age 30) Carlisle, Cumbria, England
- Height: 1.81 m (5 ft 11 1/2 in)
- Weight: 95 kg (14 st 13 lb)

Rugby union career
- Position: Lock
Senior career
Years	Team	Apps	(Points)
- Loughborough Lightning
International career
Years	Team	Apps	(Points)
2017–present	England	30	(20)
Medal record
Representing England
Women's rugby union
Rugby World Cup
Silver medal – second place	2021 New Zealand	Team competition

Catherine Mary O'Donnell (born 13 June 1996) is an English former rugby union player and model. She represented the England women's national rugby union team and played for Loughborough Lightning. She announced her retirement in 2026 having won 30 England caps.

== Early and personal life ==
O'Donnell's first rugby experience was in rugby league, where she played for local club Maryport ARLFC near her hometown of Maryport and then Keswick, Vale of Lune.

She played for the University of Liverpool as a student and she was named their athlete of the year for the 2015/16 season. O'Donnell then went to study for a Master's degree in Business Psychology at Loughborough University, graduating in 2019.

== Club career ==
O'Donnell played for Waterloo Ladies from 2014, and was recruited to the England U20s team while playing for the club.

In 2017, she signed for Loughborough Lightning. O’Donnell played her final match for the club against Saracens Women at the end of the 2023-24 season. She announced her retirement from rugby at the age of 30 years-old.

== International career ==
O'Donnell made her senior England debut against Canada in November 2017. In February 2018, she was brought on in the 2017 Women's Six Nations Championship as a replacement against Scotland and again versus Ireland. She scored her first international try in England's 37-15 win over Ireland at Twickenham Stadium in 2018 as part of the 2018 Quilter Internationals.

In 2019 she was awarded a full-time professional England contract. She started in four of England's five 2019 Women's Six Nations Championships games as the country won the grand slam. She went on to start all but one of England's Super Series fixtures in San Diego in 2019.

After the 2019 season, O'Donnell discovered she had fractured her shins and was absent from international rugby until April 2021, when she returned for the 2021 Women's Six Nations Championship. She was named in the England squad for the delayed 2021 Rugby World Cup held in New Zealand in October and November 2022.
