= Natahlia Moors =

NZ international rugby union player

- Born: 7 December 1995 (age 30) Auckland, New Zealand
- Height: 1.63 m (5 ft 4 in)
- Weight: 71 kg (157 lb)

Rugby union career
- Position: Wing
Provincial / State sides
Years	Team	Apps	(Points)
2015–2023	Auckland Storm	35	(95)
Super Rugby
Years	Team	Apps	(Points)
2021–2022	Blues Women	3	(0)
International career
Years	Team	Apps	(Points)
2018–2019	New Zealand	2	(5)

Natahlia Moors (born 7 December 1995) is a New Zealand rugby union player.

== Biography ==
Moors was born in Auckland, New Zealand to Samoan parents, her family relocated to Queensland, Australia when she was four. She represented Australia at the Youth Olympic Games. Moors made her debut for the Auckland Storm in 2015 when they won their eighth consecutive Farah Palmer Cup title. She was given a training contract for the Black Ferns Sevens squad for 2018. She made her international debut for New Zealand on 17 November 2018 against France at Grenoble.

Moors featured against the United States at the 2019 Women's Rugby Super Series in San Diego.

In 2021 Moors was named in the Blues first-ever women's squad for their historic Super Rugby clash with the Chiefs. In November, later that year, she officially signed with the Blues for the inaugural season of Super Rugby Aupiki. She was named in the Blues starting line up for their first game against Matatū, they won 21–10. She also started in their 0–35 thrashing by the Chiefs Manawa in the final round.
