= Forne Burkin =

New Zealand rugby player

- Born: 28 October 1998 (age 28)
- Height: 1.66 m (5 ft 5 in)
- Weight: 76 kg (168 lb)

Rugby union career
- Position: Hooker
Provincial / State sides
Years	Team	Apps	(Points)
2017; 2019–2020	Hawke’s Bay	12	(20)
2018	Canterbury	8	(5)
Super Rugby
Years	Team	Apps	(Points)
2025–	Hurricanes Poua	5	(5)
International career
Years	Team	Apps	(Points)
2019–	New Zealand	2	(0)

Forne Burkin (born 28 October 1998) is a New Zealand rugby union player. She has represented the Black Ferns at an international level and plays for Hurricanes Poua in the Super Rugby Aupiki competition.

== Rugby career ==
Burkin made her debut for Hawke's Bay in the 2017 season of the Farah Palmer Cup. In 2018, she moved to Christchurch to study at Lincoln University. She then debuted for Canterbury against Bay of Plenty.

She made her test debut for New Zealand against the United States at the 2019 Women's Rugby Super Series in San Diego. She earned her second international cap against the Wallaroos in the first of two test matches in Perth in 2019. After her Black Ferns debut, she returned to play for Hawke's Bay in the 2019 season of the Farah Palmer Cup.

In 2020, she was named as captain for Hawke's Bay. She was not considered for the Black Ferns at the end of that year due to injury.

She joined Hurricanes Poua in the 2025 Super Rugby Aupiki season.
