= Alycia Washington =

American rugby union player (born 1990)

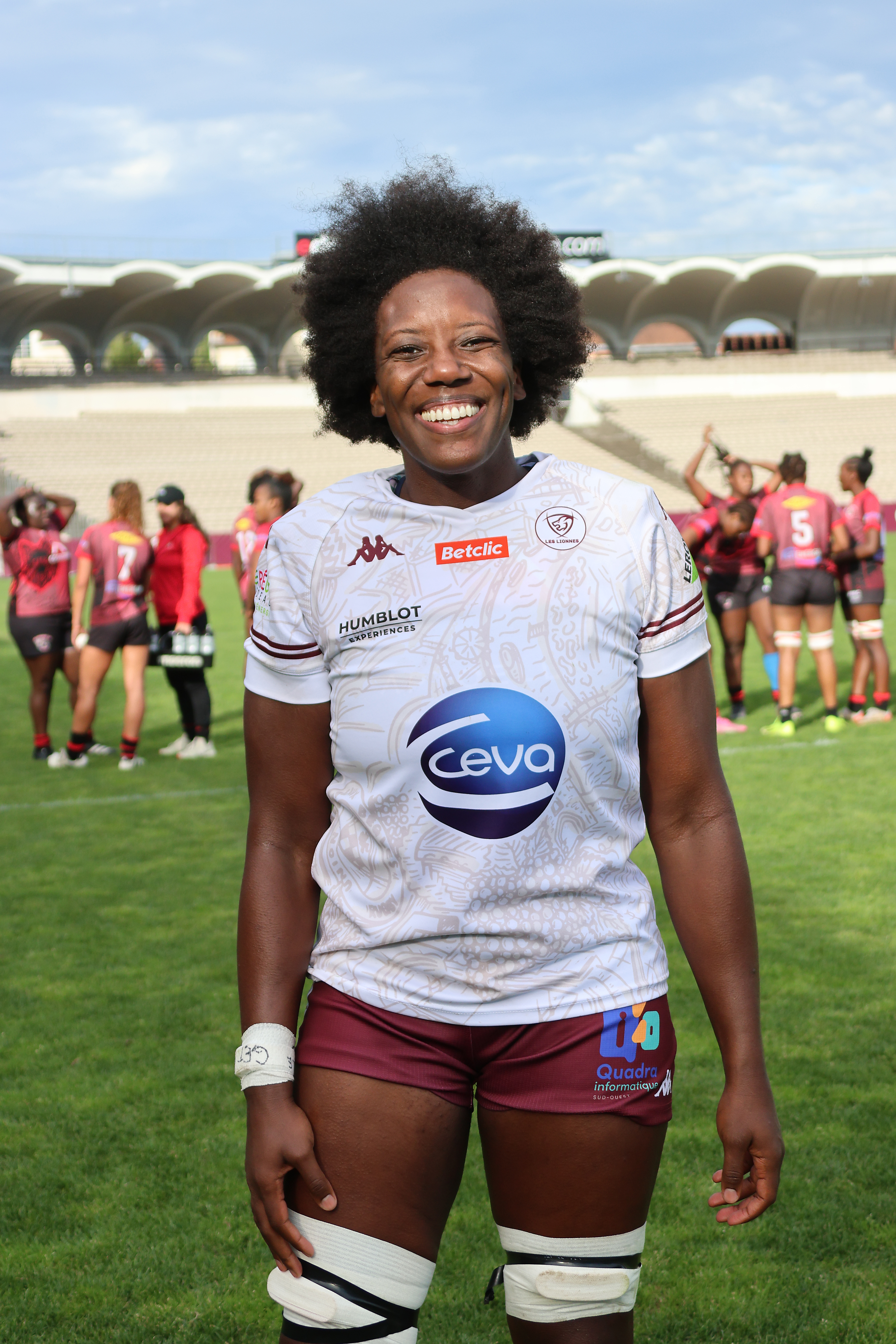
- Born: November 18, 1990 (age 35)
- Height: 6 ft 0 in (183 cm)
- Weight: 200 lb (91 kg)
- School: Hamden High School
- University: University of Connecticut

Rugby union career
- Position(s): Lock, Prop (7s)
Senior career
Years	Team	Apps	(Points)
	Scion Sirens	14	
- Hartford Wild Roses
- New York Athletic Club
- New York Rugby Club
International career
Years	Team	Apps	(Points)
2016–pres.	United States	22	
Coaching career
- Years: Team
- 2017–18: Simsbury Girl's Rugby

Alycia Washington (born November 18, 1990) is a former international-level rugby union player for the United States women's national rugby union team. She is currently a commentator for Major League Rugby, a founder and team manager for the XV Foundation, and the director of women's rugby for National Collegiate Rugby.

== Rugby career ==
Washington started playing rugby at Hamden High School in Connecticut. She was twice recognised as an All-American whilst playing rugby for the UConn Huskies at the University of Connecticut. In 2021, Washington left the United States to play club rugby for the English side Worcester Warriors Ladies. A year later she moved to rival Premier 15s side Sale Sharks Women.

=== International career ===
Washington made her debut for the United States in 2016. She was named in the Eagles 2017 Women's Rugby World Cup squad. She was in the squad that played at the 2016 Women's Rugby Super Series. Her uncle is the former Chicago Bulls Basketball player Scott Burell.

Washington was named in the United States women's national rugby union team traveling squad for the 2023 Pacific Four Series. In 2024, after earning 23 caps for the United States, Washington retired from international rugby. She played one last international match for the Barbarians against the South Africa women's national rugby union team that year.

== Post-playing career ==
After retiring, in 2025, Washington was appointed as the Director of Women's Rugby by National Collegiate Rugby. She was appointed to oversee the women's playoff system as well as the women's sevens within college rugby in the United States. In 2026, Washington was announced that she would join the broadcast team for Major League Rugby on ESPN. She also took on a role as a coach of rugby at North Haven High School.
