= Kilisitina Moata'ane =

NZ international rugby union player

- Born: 23 November 1997 (age 28) Auckland
- Height: 1.67 m (5 ft 6 in)
- Weight: 79 kg (174 lb)

Rugby union career
- Position: Wing
Senior career
Years	Team	Apps	(Points)
2022	Matatū	2	(0)
Provincial / State sides
Years	Team	Apps	(Points)
2014–2023	Otago	41	(130)
2024	Canterbury	8	(15)
International career
Years	Team	Apps	(Points)
2019	New Zealand	1	(0)

Kilisitina Vea (née Moata'ane; born 23 November 1997) is a New Zealand rugby union player.

== Personal life ==
Moata’ane is of Tongan heritage and was born in Auckland. Her family later moved to Dunedin where she was educated at Trinity Catholic College. She took up rugby as a teenager in Year 12 and is now a teacher aide at Otago Girls’ High School.

== Career ==
Moata’ane has previously represented Tonga at rugby league. She made her debut for Otago Spirit in 2014 at the age of 16. She has since scored 26 tries in 41 games for Otago. In 2017 she scored five tries against Tasman and in 2019 she helped Otago win the Farah Palmer Cup by scoring nine tries in six games. She scored four against North Harbour in Otago's round-robin win.

In 2018 she was selected for the European tour, but was injured at the pre-departure camp. The same thing happened to her again in 2019 when she was selected for the North American tour, she was ruled out with an injury. She made her Black Ferns debut off the bench in a 47–10 victory over Australia in Perth on 10 August 2019.

Moata’ane played for the Possibles against the Probables in a Black Ferns trial match in 2020.

At the Dunedin Club Rugby Award in 2021 she was named women's player of the year. Moata’ane was named in the Matatū squad for the inaugural and historical season of Super Rugby Aupiki in 2022.
