= Jacey Murphy =

Canadian rugby union player

- Born: March 21, 1989 (age 37)
- Height: 1.75 m (5 ft 9 in)
- Weight: 79 kg (174 lb)
- University: University of Guelph
- Occupation: administrative assistant

Rugby union career
- Position: Loose forward
Amateur team(s)
Years	Team	Apps	(Points)
–	Aurora Barbarians		
–	Guelph Gryphons		
International career
Years	Team	Apps	(Points)
2013-	Canada		
Medal record
Women's rugby union
Representing Canada
World Cup
Silver medal – second place	2014 France	Team competition

Jacey Murphy Grusnick (born March 21, 1989) is a Canadian rugby union player. She represented Canada at the 2014 Women's Rugby World Cup, and 2017 Women's Rugby World Cup. She made her debut at the 2013 Nations Cup against England.

On July 2, 2019, nine months after giving birth to her first child, Grusnick played for Canada against France at the Super Series.

Murphy attended the University of Guelph. She works as an administrative assistant.
