= Dwayne Nestor =

Australian rugby union coach

Rugby union career
Coaching career
- Years: Team
- 2014–2016: Western Force (Kicking coach)
- 2015: Perth Spirit (assistant coach)
- 2016: Perth Spirit (head coach)
- 2017: Australia women (Attack coach)
- 2018–2021: Australia women (head coach)

Dwayne Nestor is an Australian rugby union coach. He previously coached Perth Spirit in the NRC, and the Australian women's national team internationally.

== Rugby career ==
Nestor has coached in Perth for more than a decade. His coaching stints includes, Cottesloe in Perth's Pindan Premier Grade club competition as well as Western Australia's Under 16s and Junior Gold Cup sides.

In 2015, He served as an assistant coach for Perth Spirit before leading them to the 2016 National Rugby Championship title. He also worked as the Western Force kicking coach from 2014 to 2016.

Nestor was an assistant coach to former Wallaroos head coach, Paul Verrell. He was the attack coach for their 2017 Rugby World Cup campaign. He was appointed as the Wallaroos head coach in 2018 after Verrell's resignation.

In 2021, Nestor resigned as the Wallaross head coach after he allegedly used unacceptable language during the Super W competition.
