= Amanda Thornborough =

Canada international rugby union player

- Born: 2 July 1990 (age 36) Brandon, Manitoba
- Height: 1.65 m (5 ft 5 in)
- Weight: 68 kg (150 lb)
- School: Vincent Massey High School
- University: St. Francis Xavier University

Rugby union career
- Position: Centre
Amateur team(s)
Years	Team	Apps	(Points)
–	Velox RFC		
–	Westshore RFC		
–	St. Francis X-Women		
Senior career
Years	Team	Apps	(Points)
2017	Barbarians		
International career
Years	Team	Apps	(Points)
2013–present	Canada	23	
- Correct as of 2017-11-06
National sevens team
Years	Team		Comps
2013–?	Canada		4 apps
- Correct as of 2017-11-06
Medal record
Women's rugby union
Representing Canada
World Cup
Silver medal – second place	2014 France	Team competition

Amanda Thornborough (born 2 July 1990) is a Canadian rugby union player. She has represented Canada at the 2014 Women's Rugby World Cup. and 2017 Women's Rugby World Cup. She made her international debut in 2013 at the 2013 Nations Cup and played in the 2013 Hong Kong Sevens.

Thornborough first started playing rugby in high school in 2008 and continued at St. Francis Xavier University.

In 2017, she was invited to join the first ever Barbarians Women's team. She played once more in 2019 for the Barbarians against USA in Denver, Colorado.

In 2024, Amanda was inducted as a player into the Manitoba Rugby Hall of Fame

== Other Sports ==
=== Squash ===
Thornborough is an avid squash player and competes in an elite squash league in her current hometown of Victoria, British Columbia. Her playing style is a hybrid power-finesse style where she employs a devastating forehand straight shot along the wall on her returns while mixing in a conniving slice-drop shot, catching her opponents off guard. Her weaknesses include a mediocre serve and a troublesomely inconsistent backhand shot.
