= Charmaine McMenamin =

New Zealand international rugby player

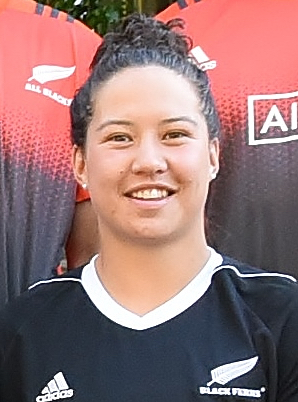
- McMenamin in 2017
- Born: 13 May 1990 (age 36) Wellington, New Zealand
- Height: 1.73 m (5 ft 8 in)
- Weight: 88 kg (194 lb)

Rugby union career
- Position: Loose forward
Provincial / State sides
Years	Team	Apps	(Points)
2009	Hawkes Bay	1	(0)
2011–2024	Auckland	60	(75)
Super Rugby
Years	Team	Apps	(Points)
2021–2024	Blues Women	12	(0)
International career
Years	Team	Apps	(Points)
2013–2022	New Zealand	31	(20)
- Rugby league career

Playing information
Representative
Years	Team	Pld	T	G	FG	P
2010–16	New Zealand	2	0	0	0	0
- As of 2 October 2025
Medal record
Women's rugby union
Representing New Zealand
Women's Rugby World Cup
Gold medal – first place	2017 Ireland	Team competition
Gold medal – first place	2021 New Zealand	Team competition

Charmaine McMenamin (born 13 May 1990) is a New Zealand rugby union and rugby league player. She previously played for the Kiwi Ferns first in 2010, and again in 2016. She made her test debut for the Black Ferns in 2013. She was a member of the Black Ferns victorious 2017 and 2021 squads.

McMenamin played for the Blues Women in the Super Rugby Aupiki competition.

== Early life ==
McMenamin was born in Wellington but was raised on the East Cape. She attended Gisborne Girls' High School. She affiliates with the Ngāti Porou iwi.

== Rugby career ==
=== Rugby League ===
McMenamin played Rugby League for New Zealand, debuting in 2010 against the touring England team. In February 2016, she played in the NRL Auckland Nines and in a Test Match against Australia.

=== Rugby Union ===
In 2013, McMenamin made her international debut for the Black Ferns against England at Auckland. She was selected for the Black Ferns squad to the 2017 Rugby World Cup in Ireland.

McMenamin featured in two test matches against Australia in August 2018.

In June 2019, McMenamin was part of the winning team of the Super Series in San Diego. She next featured in two tests against the Wallaroos in August as the Black Ferns clean swept the series. She scored two first half tries in the first test as New Zealand won 47–10. She then scored again in the second test to help the Black Ferns win 37–8 and retain the Laurie O'Reilly Cup.

In December 2019, She was awarded the International Women's Player of the Year by the New Zealand Rugby Players Association.

McMenamin was named as Vice-captain of the Possibles team in a Black Ferns trial match in November. She turned out for the Black Ferns a week later in two games against the New Zealand Barbarians.

McMenamin played for the Blues against the Chiefs in the first-ever women's Super Rugby match in New Zealand on 1 May 2021. She later discovered that she had bone spurs on her spinal cord that required surgery. She has since recovered after a spinal fusion in October.

In July 2022, McMenamin played for the Ngalingali team in a Black Ferns trial match. She made her return to the Black Ferns as she was selected in the squad for the Laurie O’Reilly Cup Test series against Australia in August.

McMenamin made the Black Ferns 32-player squad for the 2021 Rugby World Cup.

On 23 October 2024, the Blues Women announced that McMenamin would be joining their coaching staff as forwards coach for the 2025 Super Rugby Aupiki season.
