= Emily Scott (rugby union) =

England international rugby union player

- Born: 30 June 1992 (age 34) Leytonstone, London
- Height: 1.65 m (5 ft 5 in)
- Weight: 67 kg (148 lb)
- School: Gable Hall School, Essex
- University: Brunel University
- Occupation: Professional rugby player

Rugby union career
- Position: Fly half
Senior career
Years	Team	Apps	(Points)
2018-present	Harlequins Women	60	
2016	Saracens	18	
2014	Thurrock		
International career
Years	Team	Apps	(Points)
2013–present	England	38	(42)
National sevens team
Years	Team		Comps
2016	Great Britain		
Medal record
Representing England
Women's rugby sevens
Commonwealth Games
Bronze medal – third place	2018 Gold Coast	Team competition
Women's rugby union
Rugby World Cup
Gold medal – first place	2025 England	Team competition
Silver medal – second place	2021 New Zealand	Team competition
Silver medal – second place	2017 Ireland	Team competition

Emily L. Scott (born 30 June 1992) is an English rugby union player. She was selected as a member of the Great Britain women's national rugby sevens team to the 2016 Summer Olympics.

She went to Gable Hall School in Corringham, Essex and attended Brunel University. In 2014 Scott was among several female English rugby players to receive professional contracts.

Scott currently plays Fly Half for Harlequins Women, and won the Allianz Premier 15's in 2020–21 season.

Scott was selected for the 2017 Women's Rugby World Cup squad.
