= Leilani Perese =

NZ international rugby union player

- Born: 1 January 1993 (age 33) Wairoa
- Height: 1.79 m (5 ft 10 in)
- Weight: 125 kg (276 lb)

Rugby union career
- Position: Prop
Provincial / State sides
Years	Team	Apps	(Points)
2012–2014	Auckland	15	(5)
2016–Present	Counties Manakau	45	(45)
Super Rugby
Years	Team	Apps	(Points)
2021	Chiefs Manawa	1	(0)
2022–2024	Hurricanes Poua	8	(0)
International career
Years	Team	Apps	(Points)
2018–2022	New Zealand	12	(0)

Leilani Perese (born 1 January 1993) is a New Zealand rugby union player. She debuted for the Black Ferns in 2018. She also plays for Hurricanes Poua in the Super Rugby Aupiki competition and represents Counties Manukau provincially.

== Rugby career ==
=== 2010–16 ===
In 2010 Perese studied for a Bachelor of Physical Education degree at the University of Auckland. She made 15 appearances for Auckland from 2012 to 2014 before switching to Counties Manukau in 2016.

=== 2018 ===
Perese was included in the historic Black Ferns squad that received contracts in 2018. She made her debut for New Zealand against Australia in the first of two test matches in 2018 in Sydney. She earned her second cap in their 45–17 victory in the second test match.

Three months after making her debut, she was named in the Black Ferns squad for the November tests against the United States and France. She came off the bench in her sides 67–6 routing of the Eagles. She played both matches against France, they won the first test 14–0 in Toulon, but lost the second test 27–30 in Grenoble.

=== 2019–20 ===
Perese was selected for the Black Ferns squad for the 2019 Women's Rugby Super Series in San Diego, she featured in all four games. She faced the Wallaroos again, a year after her debut, winning both tests 47–10 and 37–8. In 2020 she was named in the Black Ferns contracted squad.

=== 2022 ===
Perese appeared for Hurricanes Poua in the inaugural 2022 Super Rugby Aupiki season. She was selected for the Black Ferns squad for the 2022 Pacific Four Series.

== Personal life ==
Perese is a New Zealander of Māori descent (Ngāpuhi descent) and in early 2024, she became famous for creating a haka for the Hurricanes Poua as a way of protesting against the current New Zealand government and in defense of the rights of the Māori people.
