= 2016 Women's Rugby Super Series =

Women's Rugby Super Series 2016
- Countries: Canada; England; France; United States
- Champions: Canada
- Runners-up: England
- Matches played: 6

The Women's Rugby Super Series 2016 was the second of the Women's Rugby Super Series. It was contested by 2014 world champion England, runner-up Canada, France (who replaced New Zealand from the 2015 tournament) and United States. It was held in Salt Lake City, Utah, United States.

The tournament was won by Canada with England second, France third and USA last.

== Table ==
Pos	Team	Pld	W	D	L	PF	PA	PD	Pts
1	Canada	3	3	0	0	114	32	+82	15
2	England	3	2	0	1	73	78	−5	9
3	France	3	1	0	2	42	59	−17	5
4	United States	3	0	0	3	31	91	−60	1

=== Points scoring ===
4 points awarded for a win, 2 points for a draw, no points for a loss. 1 bonus point awarded for scoring four or more tries and 1 bonus point for losing by less than 7 points.

== Fixtures and results ==
=== Day one ===
1 July 2016

Canada	52–17	England
	Report

Regional Athletic Complex, Salt Lake City, Utah

1 July 2016

France	19–13	United States
	Report

Regional Athletic Complex, Salt Lake City, Utah

=== Day two ===
5 July 2016

England	17–13	France
	Report

Regional Athletic Complex, Salt Lake City, Utah

5 July 2016

Canada	33–5	United States
	Report

Regional Athletic Complex, Salt Lake City, Utah

=== Day three ===
9 July 2016

Canada	29–10	France
	Report

Regional Athletic Complex, Salt Lake City, Utah

9 July 2016

England	39–13	United States
	Report

Regional Athletic Complex, Salt Lake City, Utah

== See also ==
- Women's international rugby

Preceded by Super Series 2015	Super Series; 2016; Canada	Succeeded by Super Series 2019
