= Simon Middleton =

English rugby league footballer and coach

Simon Middleton MBE
Personal information
- Full name: Simon Middleton
- Born: 2 February 1966 (age 59); Knottingley, England

Playing information
- Position: Wing
Club
Years	Team	Pld	T	G	FG	P
1991–97	Castleford	170	83	5	0	342
1998	Bramley	6	5	0	0	20
	Total	176	88	5	0	362

Coaching information
Representative
Years	Team	Gms	W	D	L	W%
2016	Great Britain Women's RU 7s	6	4	0	2	67
2015–23	England Women

Simon Middleton MBE (born 2 February 1966) is an English former rugby union and professional rugby league footballer who played in the 1980s and 1990s and was the head coach of the England Women's rugby union team from 2015 to 2023.

== Playing career ==
Middleton is a former cross-code wing/full back having played rugby league for Castleford as well as rugby union for a number of clubs including Leeds Tykes, where he took up a coaching role following his retirement from playing.

== Coaching career ==
He spent 11 years at Leeds holding various coaching roles including defence, skills and eventually assistant coach, and helped them to the Premiership twice as well as achieve Heineken Cup qualification for the first time in their history. He joined the RFU in 2014 and led the England Women Sevens on the World Series, as well as taking a role as assistant coach for the 2014 Rugby World Cup in France where England were crowned champions. In 2015, he became Red Roses head coach initially in a joint role with sevens. He was appointed head coach of Team GB Women Sevens where the team finished fourth at the Rio 2016 Summer Olympics, the sport’s Olympic debut, before focusing fully on XVs on his return. Since taking the role, Middleton has guided England to three Six Nations Grand Slams in 2017, 2019 and 2020, the 2021 Six Nations title and helped the team reach a fifth straight World Cup final in 2017 when they lost 41-32.

Middleton was appointed Member of the Order of the British Empire (MBE) in the 2021 Birthday Honours for services to rugby football.

== Personal life ==
Middleton is married to Janet. They have two children, Joel and Cara.
