= Rebecca Clough =

Australian rugby union player

- Born: 14 November 1988 (age 37) Sydney
- Height: 178 cm (5 ft 10 in)
- Weight: 80 kg (176 lb)

Rugby union career
- Position: Lock
Senior career
Years	Team	Apps	(Points)
- Worcester Valkyries
Super Rugby
Years	Team	Apps	(Points)
- Western Force
International career
Years	Team	Apps	(Points)
2009–2019	Australia	24	(0)

Rebecca Clough (born 14 November 1988) is an Australian rugby union player. She represented Australia at three Rugby World Cups in 2010, 2014 and 2017.

== Early career ==
Clough played netball, soccer, athletics, and swimming as a child. She first played rugby union at 18.

== Rugby career ==
Clough made her test debut against Samoa in 2009. The Wallaroos scored 87 unanswered points over Samoa in their Oceania qualifier for the 2010 World Cup.

She was a member of the Australian side that finished in third place at the 2010 Rugby World Cup in England. She appeared for her side in their opening match against Wales.

Clough was named Australian women's player of the year at the national rugby championships in 2010. She is known for her ferocious defence, hard hitting and strong leadership. She played for the Worcester Valkyries in the Premier 15s.

Clough featured for Australia in their O'Reilly Cup test against New Zealand in 2014 ahead of the World Cup. She was named in Australia's 2014 Rugby World Cup squad, her second World Cup appearance. In 2015, she played club rugby for Cottesloe in Western Australia and for the Western Force in the Super W competition.

In 2017, she returned from a knee reconstruction and competed in her third World Cup in Ireland. She came off the bench in their final pool game against Japan. She was sin-binned for a dangerous tackle in the Wallaroos final match against Canada in her sides fifth place playoff. In August 2018, she was named in the Australian side that faced the Black Ferns in their second double header match at Eden Park.

During a Super W match in March 2019, between Queensland Reds and Rugby WA, she was bitten by Wallaroos teammate, Liz Patu, who was suspended for 12 weeks. In November 2019, she featured for the Barbarians team against Wales at the Millennium Stadium in Cardiff.

Clough returned to the Western Force side for the 2022 Super W season.
