= Renee Wickliffe =

NZ international rugby union player

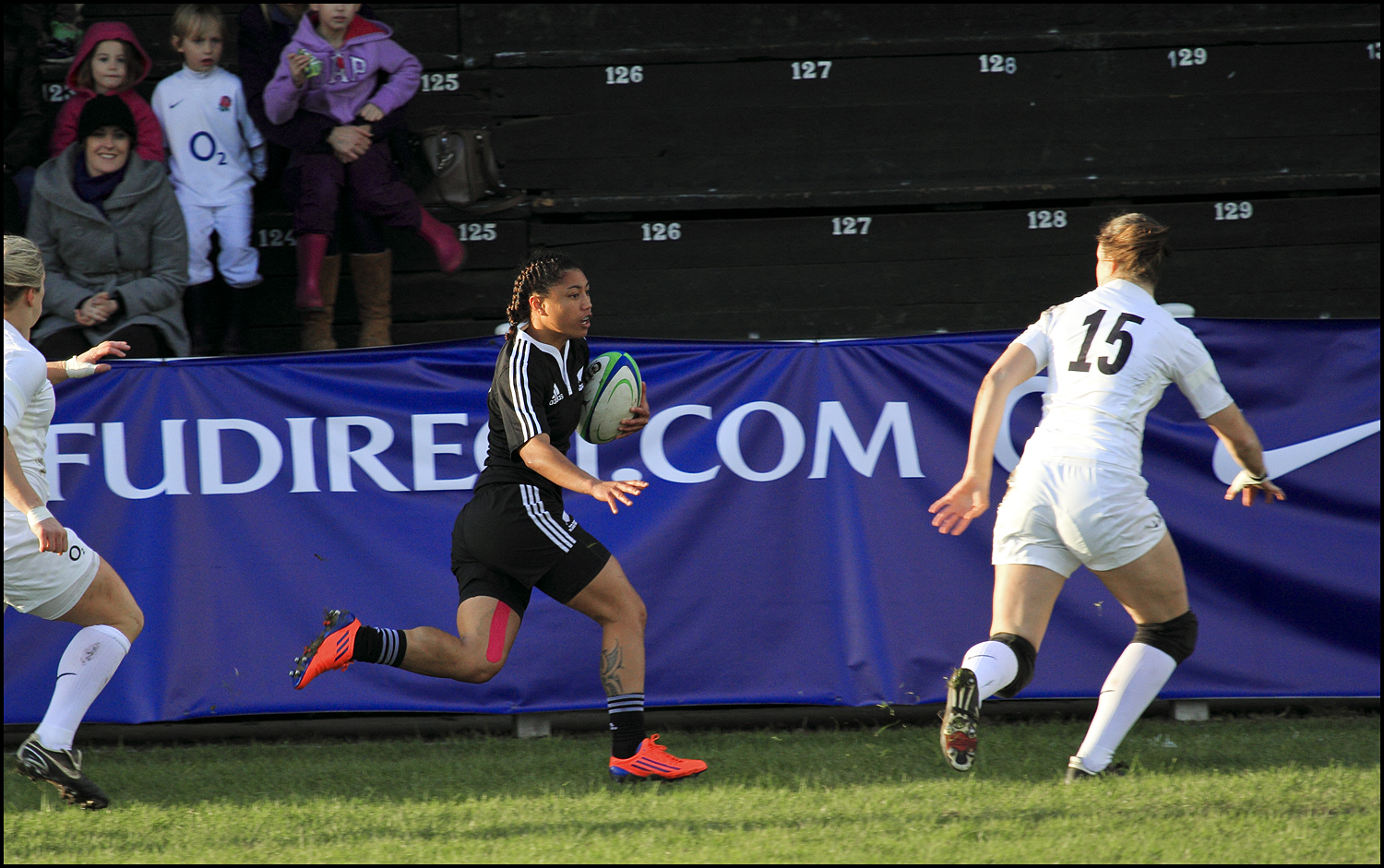
- Wickliffe in 2011
- Born: Renee Wickliffe; 30 May 1987 (age 39)
- Height: 1.64 m (5 ft 5 in)
- Weight: 63 kg (9 st 13 lb)

Rugby union career
- Position: Wing
Provincial / State sides
Years	Team	Apps	(Points)
2009–2011	Auckland	12	(40)
2013–2016	Counties Manukau	14	(85)
2018–2023	Bay of Plenty	20	(68)
Super Rugby
Years	Team	Apps	(Points)
2022	Chiefs Manawa	3	(5)
2024	Blues Women	3	(0)
International career
Years	Team	Apps	(Points)
2009–2022	New Zealand	46	(120)
National sevens team
Years	Team		Comps
2009–	New Zealand 7s		
Medal record
Women's rugby union
Representing New Zealand
Women's Rugby World Cup
Gold medal – first place	2010 England	Team competition
Gold medal – first place	2017 Ireland	Team competition
Gold medal – first place	2021 New Zealand	Team competition
Sevens World Cup
Silver medal – second place	2009 Dubai	Team competition
Gold medal – first place	2013 Moscow	Team competition

Renee Woodman-Wickliffe (née Wickliffe; born 30 May 1987) is a New Zealand rugby union player. She represents New Zealand and Auckland. She was in the squad that won the 2010 Rugby World Cup and the 2013 Rugby World Cup Sevens.

== Biography ==
Wickliffe was named in the Black Ferns squad to the 2014 Women's Rugby World Cup. She was included in the Black Ferns squad for the 2015 Women's Rugby Super Series in Canada and was named in the squad for the 2017 Rugby World Cup.

In 2019, she was part of the winning team of the Super Series, scoring a hat-trick in the final deciding game against England.

Wickliffe was named in the Chiefs squad for the inaugural season of Super Rugby Aupiki in 2022. She was called in as an injury replacement for the Black Ferns squad to the 2022 Pacific Four Series.

Wickliffe made the Black Ferns 32-player squad for the delayed 2021 Rugby World Cup. She scored a brace of tries against a scoreless Scotland in the Black Ferns final pool game .

== Personal life ==
Wickliffe has been in a long-term relationship with fellow Black Fern and World Cup winner Portia Woodman since 2013, and they married in December 2022. They have both adopted the surname Woodman-Wickliffe.
