= Kendra Cocksedge =

NZ international rugby union player & cricketer

Kendra Cocksedge MNZM
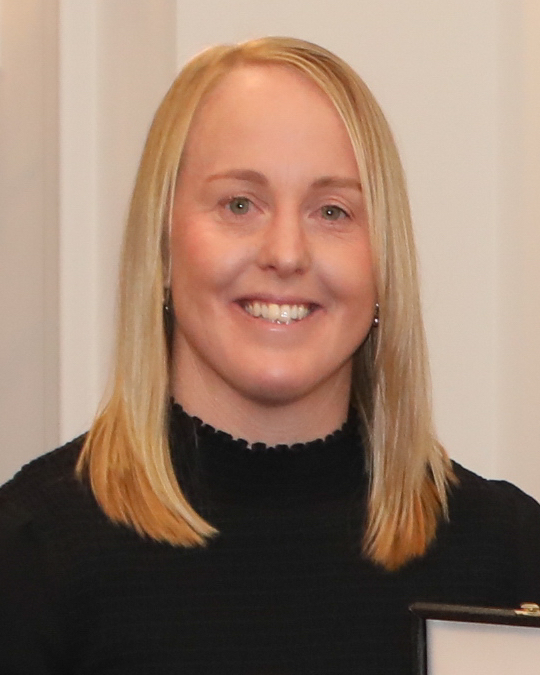
- Cocksedge in 2021
- Born: Kendra Margaret Cocksedge; 1 July 1988 (age 38) New Plymouth, New Zealand
- Height: 1.57 m (5 ft 2 in)
- Weight: 64 kg (141 lb)

Rugby union career
- Position: Halfback
Provincial / State sides
Years	Team	Apps	(Points)
2007–2022	Canterbury	100	(1085)
Super Rugby
Years	Team	Apps	(Points)
2022	Matatū	1	(6)
International career
Years	Team	Apps	(Points)
2007–2022	New Zealand	68	(404)
- Cricket career

Cricket information
- Batting: Right-handed
- Bowling: Right-arm medium

Domestic team information
- Years: Team
- 2004/05–2007/08: Central Districts

Career statistics
Competition	WLA	WT20
Matches	38	5
Runs scored	287	24
Batting average	13.66	12.00
100s/50s	0/1	0/0
Top score	66	16
Balls bowled	336	60
Wickets	8	1
Bowling average	31.12	88.00
5 wickets in innings	0	0
10 wickets in match	0	0
Best bowling	2/32	1/23
Catches/stumpings	15/–	1/–
- Source: CricketArchive, 11 September 2022
Medal record
Women's rugby union
Representing New Zealand
Women's Rugby World Cup
Gold medal – first place	2021 New Zealand	Team competition
Gold medal – first place	2017 Ireland	Team competition
Gold medal – first place	2010 England	Team competition

Kendra Margaret Cocksedge MNZM (born 1 July 1988) is a retired New Zealand Rugby Union player and Cricketer. She played for the New Zealand Women's national rugby union side, the Black Ferns and for the Canterbury provincial side. She was a member of the 2010, 2017 and 2021 Rugby World Cup winning squads. In 2018 she won the Kelvin R Tremain Memorial Player of the Year Award at the annual New Zealand Rugby awards.

== Early life ==
Cocksedge was originally from Taranaki, she played rugby from a young age and made the Taranaki and Hurricanes Secondary School teams. She also represented the Central Hinds at cricket, debuting as a 15-year-old.

== Cricket career ==
Cocksedge wore cap #100 for the Central Districts Hinds, playing 38 List A one-day matches and five Twenty20s. She debuted in the 2004–5 season and played through to the 2007–8 season State League final (after she has already become a Black Fern). When her rugby and cricket commitments required her to choose a single sport, she retired from cricket.

== Rugby career ==
In 2007, at the age of 19, she made her debut for Canterbury after moving there to study at Lincoln University. She later made her international debut for the Black Ferns on 16 October that year against the Wallaroos at Wanganui. In addition to Rugby union, Cocksedge has also represented New Zealand in the sport of Rugby sevens and was a member of the winning team of the Women's Sevens World Series in 2013.

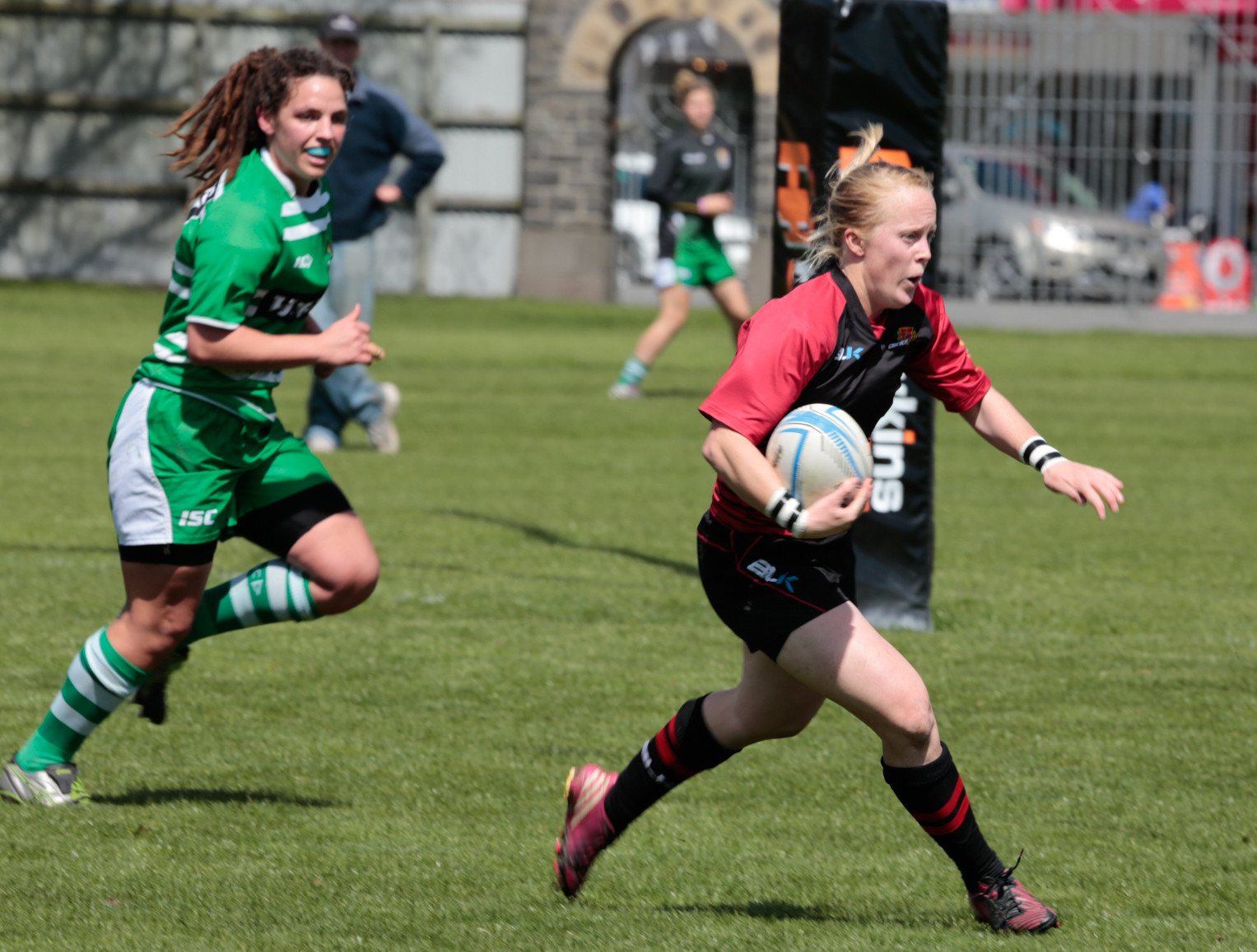
Cocksedge playing for Canterbury

=== 2014–2017 ===
In 2014 Cocksedge started in all nine matches for the Canterbury Women's Provincial Team, performing strongly and scoring 101 points. Following this Cocksedge made her Test debut for New Zealand and was named in the squad to the 2014 Women's Rugby World Cup.

In 2015, she was top point scorer with 26 points at the 2015 Women's Rugby Super Series. She was named New Zealand's Women's Player of the Year at the end of 2015 and went on to be named in the 2017 Women's Rugby World Cup squad that won the tournament.

=== 2018–2021 ===
Cocksedge became the first woman to be receive the Kelvin R Tremain Memorial Award for Player of the Year at the New Zealand Rugby awards in 2018. In 2019 she was part of the winning team of the Women's Super Rugby Series.

In the 2021 New Year Honours, Cocksedge was appointed a Member of the New Zealand Order of Merit, for services to rugby. Cocksedge was one of five players who signed with the Matatū rugby team for the inaugural season of the Super Rugby Aupiki.

=== 2022 ===
Cocksedge was selected for the Black Ferns squad for the 2022 Pacific Four Series. She was recalled into the team for the August test series against the Wallaroos for the Laurie O'Reilly Cup.

Cocksedge appeared in her fourth World Cup when she made the Black Ferns 32-player squad for the delayed 2021 Rugby World Cup. She helped the Black Ferns claim their sixth Rugby World Cup title. Cocksedge later retired from rugby after the World Cup.
