= Eloise Blackwell =

New Zealand rugby player

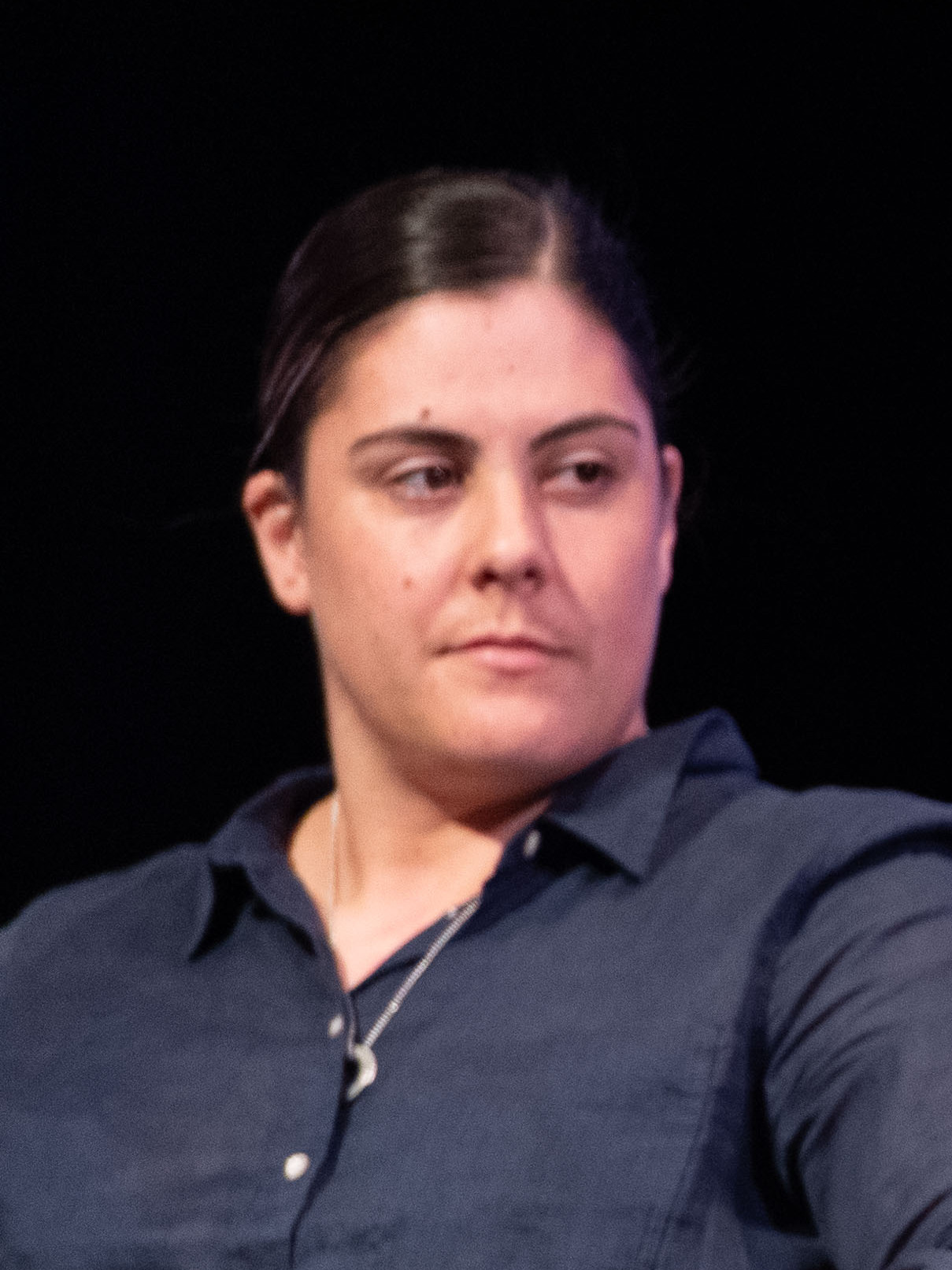
- Blackwell at Gender Equality in Women's Sport panel discussion on 20 July 2023
- Born: 28 December 1990 (age 35) Auckland, New Zealand
- Height: 1.81 m (5 ft 11 in)
- Weight: 91 kg (201 lb)

Rugby union career
- Position: Lock
Provincial / State sides
Years	Team	Apps	(Points)
2009–Present	Auckland	76	(95)
Super Rugby
Years	Team	Apps	(Points)
2021–Present	Blues Women	21	(0)
International career
Years	Team	Apps	(Points)
2011–present	New Zealand	46	(55)
Medal record
Women's rugby union
Representing New Zealand
Women's Rugby World Cup
Gold medal – first place	2017 Ireland	Team competition

Eloise Blackwell (born 28 December 1990) is a New Zealand rugby union player. She was a member of New Zealand's squad at the 2014 Rugby World Cup, and was also a part of their champion 2017 side. She also plays for the Blues Women in the Super Rugby Aupiki competition and represents Auckland provincially.

== Background ==
Blackwell is a teacher by profession and teaches at Epsom Girls' Grammar School. She graduated with a Bachelor's degree in Physical education from the University of Auckland in 2013.

== Rugby career ==
=== 2009–14 ===
Blackwell has played for Auckland since 2009, and made her test debut for the Black Ferns on 26 November 2011 against England at London.

Blackwell was a member of the Black Ferns side that lost to Ireland in the pool stage of the 2014 Rugby World Cup.

=== 2017 ===
Blackwell was selected for the Black Ferns 2017 Rugby World Cup squad. They won their fifth World Cup title after defeating England 41–32 in the final.

=== 2018 ===
In 2018, Blackwell was one of 28 players who became the first women in New Zealand to receive professional contracts. She scored a try in the second Test of the Laurie O'Reilly Cup against the Wallaroos at Eden Park.

=== 2019–20 ===
Blackwell was part of the winning team of the 2019 Super Series at San Diego. She scored tries against Canada, and the United States at the tournament. A month later, she scored a try in the second Test of the O'Reilly Cup against the Wallaroos in Auckland. She captained the Black Ferns against a New Zealand Barbarians side in 2020.

=== 2021–22 ===
Blackwell played for the Blues against the Chiefs in the first-ever women's Super Rugby match in New Zealand on 1 May 2021. She was part of the Black Ferns disappointing end-of-year tour of England and France in October and November.

On 3 November 2021, She was named in the Blues Women's squad for the inaugural Super Rugby Aupiki competition.

In 2022, she was one of 29 players contracted to the Black Ferns. She featured in the Blues Women's 0–35 thrashing by the Chiefs Manawa in the final round of the Super Rugby Aupiki competition.
