= Aleisha-Pearl Nelson =

- Born: 2 March 1990 (age 36)
- Height: 1.82 m (6 ft 0 in)
- Weight: 112 kg (247 lb)

Rugby union career
- Position: Prop
Provincial / State sides
Years	Team	Apps	(Points)
2008–present	Auckland Storm	75	(65)
Super Rugby
Years	Team	Apps	(Points)
2021	Blues Women	1	(0)
International career
Years	Team	Apps	(Points)
2012–present	New Zealand	40	(10)
Medal record
Women's rugby union
Representing New Zealand
Women's Rugby World Cup
Gold medal – first place	2017 Ireland	Team competition

Aleisha-Pearl Nelson (born 2 March 1990) is a New Zealand rugby union player. She plays for the Black Ferns and for the Auckland Storm.

== Biography ==
Nelson graduated from the Auckland University of Technology as a nurse.

Nelson made her Black Ferns debut on 23 November 2012 against England at Esher. She was named in the 2017 Women's Rugby World Cup squad. She was part of the winning team of the 2019 Women's Rugby Super Series.

Nelson played for the Blues against the Chiefs in the first-ever women's Super Rugby match in New Zealand on 1 May 2021. On 3 November 2021, She was named in the Blues squad for the inaugural Super Rugby Aupiki competition.
