= Charmaine Smith (rugby union) =

New Zealand rugby union player

- Born: 15 November 1990 (age 36) Dargaville, New Zealand
- Height: 1.83 m (6 ft 0 in)
- Weight: 99 kg (218 lb)

Rugby union career
- Position: Lock
Provincial / State sides
Years	Team	Apps	(Points)
2016–2017	North Harbour	11	(10)
Super Rugby
Years	Team	Apps	(Points)
2023–Present	Chiefs Manawa	16	(0)
International career
Years	Team	Apps	(Points)
2015–2019	New Zealand	27	(20)
Medal record
Women's rugby union
Representing New Zealand
Women's Rugby World Cup
Gold medal – first place	2017 Ireland	Team competition

Charmaine Smith (born 15 November 1990) is a New Zealand rugby union player. She was part of the Black Ferns 2017 Rugby World Cup champion side. She previously played for the Blues Women in the Super Rugby Aupiki competition before switching to Chiefs Manawa in 2023.

== Rugby career ==
Smith debuted for New Zealand against Canada at Calgary in 2015. She was named in the Black Ferns squad for the 2017 Rugby World Cup in Ireland. She was part of the winning team of the 2019 Women's Rugby Super Series.

Smith retired from playing rugby in 2020 for health reasons, and returned to her career as a sergeant in the New Zealand Police. A week after giving birth, Smith had a progress scan and was "cleared of any residual health issues". She signed with the Blues for the inaugural season of Super Rugby Aupiki in 2022.

Smith signed with Chiefs Manawa for the 2023 Super Rugby Aupiki season.
