= Chelsea Semple =

New Zealand rugby union player

- Born: 7 November 1992 (age 34)
- Height: 1.78 m (5 ft 10 in)
- Weight: 84 kg (185 lb)

Rugby union career
- Position: Centre
Provincial / State sides
Years	Team	Apps	(Points)
2017–Present	Waikato	52	(425)
2015–2016	North Harbour Hibiscus	6	(34)
2012–2014	Waikato	52	(425)
2011	Auckland	5	(15)
Super Rugby
Years	Team	Apps	(Points)
2021–22; 2024	Chiefs Manawa	9	(19)
International career
Years	Team	Apps	(Points)
2013–2022	New Zealand	29	(27)
National sevens team
Years	Team		Comps
2014	New Zealand 7s		
Medal record
Women's rugby union
Representing New Zealand
Women's Rugby World Cup
Gold medal – first place	2017 Ireland	Team competition

Chelsea Semple (née Alley, born 7 November 1992) is a New Zealand rugby union player. She was part of the Black Ferns side that won their fifth Rugby World Cup title in 2017. She plays for the Chiefs Manawa in the Super Rugby Aupiki competition.

== Rugby career ==
Semple made her test debut for the Black Ferns against England in July 2013.

Semple was named in the squad to the 2017 Women's Rugby World Cup. She scored a try in the Black Ferns 121–0 trouncing of Hong Kong at the World Cup. She has also represented New Zealand in sevens. Semple was part of the winning team of the 2019 Women's Rugby Super Series.

In 2020 Semple was nominated for the Fiao'o Fa'amausili Medal for the Farah Palmer Cup Player of the Year. She was part of the Chiefs Manawa team that played the Blues Women in the first women's Super Rugby match in 2021. She was then selected for the Black Ferns Autumn International tour of England and France. She featured in the Black Ferns historic 100th test match, England won 43–12. Semple then faced France in her sides 7–29 loss at Castres.

Semple signed with Chiefs Manawa for the inaugural 2022 Super Rugby Aupiki season. She was named in the Black Ferns squad for the 2022 Pacific Four Series. She was recalled into the team for the August test series against Australia for the 2022 Laurie O'Reilly Cup.

After missing the 2023 season due to pregnancy, she rejoined Chiefs Manawa for the 2024 Super Rugby Aupiki season. She returned to the field for Chiefs Manawa eight months after giving birth.

In the Chiefs Manawa game against the Blues in Hamilton on 30 March 2024 she came off the bench in the second half in score a try in what was her 100th first-class game.

== Personal life ==
In 2018 while she was playing for the Waikato women's team she meet James Semple, the team's assistant and backs coach. Their relationship progressed as she advanced to team captain and him to head coach. They married on 5 February 2022.

In 2023 she became the first Black Ferns player on full-time contract to become pregnant. After a 42-hour labour she gave birth to daughter Cameron (”Cami”) Ellie Semple in July 2023. Despite having a seizure immediately after giving birth due to extreme exhaustion and blood loss Semple had sufficiently recovered to begin a gentle fitness training regime two weeks later.
