= Leslie-Ann Elder =

New Zealand rugby union player

- Born: Leslie-Ann Te Atahira Ketu; 10 January 1987 (age 39) Taumarunui, New Zealand
- Height: 1.64 m (5 ft 5 in)
- Weight: 65 kg (143 lb)

Rugby union career
- Position: Loose forward
Provincial / State sides
| Years | Team | Apps | (Points) |
| 2014–2016 | Waikato | 19 | (15) |
| 2017–2022 | Bay of Plenty | 19 | (25) |
Super Rugby
| Years | Team | Apps | (Points) |
| 2021–2022 | Chiefs Manawa | 4 | (5) |
International career
| Years | Team | Apps | (Points) |
| 2015–2021 | New Zealand | 22 | (10) |
National sevens team
| Years | Team | | Comps |
| 2016–? | New Zealand | | |
Medal record
Women's rugby union
Representing New Zealand
Women's Rugby World Cup
| Gold medal – first place | 2017 Ireland | Team competition |

Leslie-Ann Te Atahira Elder (née Ketu; born 10 January 1987) is a former New Zealand rugby union player. She was a member of the New Zealand squad that won their fifth title at the 2017 Women's Rugby World Cup.

== Rugby career ==
Elder debuted for the Black Ferns on 27 June 2015 against Canada at Calgary. She was selected for the 2017 Women's Rugby World Cup squad. She is the Bay of Plenty Rugby Union women's development officer. Prior to the World Cup Ketu was also part of the Black Ferns squad that participated in the 2017 International Women's Rugby Series against Canada, Australia and England.

Elder captained the Chiefs Manawa to their inaugural Super Rugby Aupiki title in 2022. She announced her retirement from rugby on 18 November 2022.
