= Te Kura Ngata-Aerengamate =

Cook Islands & NZ international rugby league & union footballer

Personal information
- Full name: Te Kura Rongo Ngata-Aerengamate
- Born: 21 October 1991 (age 33)
- Died: Auckland, New Zealand
- Height: 1.66 m (5 ft 5 in)
- Weight: 96 kg (212 lb; 15 st 2 lb)

Playing information

Rugby union
- Position: Hooker, Prop
Club
Years	Team	Pld	T	G	FG	P
2021	Blues Women	1	0	0	0	0
2022–2023	Hurricanes Poua	7	2	0	0	10
	Total	8	2	0	0	10
Representative
Years	Team	Pld	T	G	FG	P
2014–2021	New Zealand	34	3	0	0	15

Rugby league
- Position: Hooker, Lock
Representative
Years	Team	Pld	T	G	FG	P
2017	Cook Islands	3	0	0	0	0
Medals
Women's rugby union
Representing New Zealand
Women's Rugby World Cup
Gold medal – first place	2017 Ireland	Team competition

Te Kura Rongo Ngata-Aerengamate (born 21 October 1991) is a New Zealand women's rugby player who has represented New Zealand in rugby union and the Cook Islands in rugby league.

== Personal life ==
Ngata-Aerengamate was born in Auckland, New Zealand. She is a teacher and taught at Tangaroa College and now teaches at Kaitaia College. She teaches the Maori language and P.E. She is of Maori and Cook Island descent.

== Rugby career ==
=== Rugby Union ===
Ngata-Aerengamate debuted for New Zealand Black Ferns in 2014 against Australia. She was named in the Black Ferns squad for the 2017 Women's Rugby World Cup in Ireland. She led the haka at the World Cup. In 2022, Ngata-Aerengamate criticised New Zealand Rugby for alleged favouritism and that Maori and Moana Pasifika origin players were being marginalised with "body shaming" comments being made by coaches. The coach accused stepped down from his role with the Black Ferns and New Zealand Rugby carried out a cultural review, apologising to Ngata-Aerengamate for what happened.

Ngata-Aerengamate played for the Blues against the Chiefs in the first-ever women's Super Rugby match in New Zealand on 1 May 2021. On 3 November 2021, she was named in the Blues squad for the inaugural Super Rugby Aupiki competition. In June 2025, it was revealed that she had been appointed as the head coach of Hamotorangi's women's team in the East Coast Rugby Football Union.

=== Rugby League ===
Ngata-Aerengamate played for the Cook Islands at the 2017 Women's Rugby League World Cup, and in rugby league nines at the 2018 Rugby League Commonwealth Championship, scoring a try against Canada.
