= Glenn Moore (rugby union) =

New Zealand rugby union player & coach (born 1959)

- Born: 25 September 1959 (age 67) Takapuna, New Zealand

Rugby union career
- Position: Loose forward
Provincial / State sides
Years	Team	Apps	(Points)
1991–1994	Mid Canterbury		
Coaching career
- Years: Team
- 2015–2022: New Zealand Women
- 2015–2016: Blues (assistant coach)
- 2008–2010: Highlanders
- 2006–2007: Otago (assistant coach)
- 2003–2005: NZ Divisional XV
- 2000–2005: North Otago
- 1995–1997: Zingari-Richmond

Glenn Moore (born 25 September 1959) is a New Zealand rugby union coach and former player. He was the Black Ferns head coach from 2015 to 2022. He guided them to their fifth World Cup title in 2017 before stepping down in 2022. Moore played as a flanker for Mid Canterbury during the 1990s playing between 1991 and 1994.

== Coaching career ==
=== Club & Provincial ===
Moore captained Zingari-Richmond in Dunedin between 1991 and 1994 before he became their coach for the next three years.

Moore joined North Otago for the 2000 season and by the end of the year had already made a big impact. In 2002 he coached the union to the final of the NPC 3rd Division which the side won and were promoted to the 2nd division. Moore was responsible for the rapid development of the North Otago provincial team, taking them from the third division into the second where they were semifinalists in his last two years.

Moore was then the New Zealand Divisional XV coach in 2003, he stayed in the role until 2005. He was Otago's assistant coach between 2006 and 2007. He led Mid Canterbury to two successive titles in 2013 and 2014 in the Heartland Championship.

=== Super Rugby ===
Moore was the Highlanders defence coach from 2006 to 2007 before he was named as Head Coach for the 2008 season. He was replaced after the 2010 season by Jamie Joseph. He joined the Blues in 2015 as their forwards coach until 2016.

=== International ===
In 2015 Moore replaced Greg Smith as the head coach of the New Zealand women's national rugby team. He resigned 6 months before the Rugby World Cup in 2022.

Sporting positions
Preceded by Greg Smith	Black Ferns coach 2015–2022	Succeeded by Wayne Smith
