= 2016 Laurie O'Reilly Cup =

Tournament details
- Date: 22–26 October
- Countries: Australia; New Zealand
- Teams: 2

Final positions
- Champions: New Zealand (9th title)

Tournament statistics
- Matches played: 2
- Tries scored: 15 (7.5 per match)
- Top scorer(s): Selica Winiata (25 points)
- Most tries: Selica Winiata (5 tries)

The 2016 Laurie O'Reilly Cup was the ninth edition of the competition.

Australia toured New Zealand to play the Black Ferns in a two test series on 22 and 26 October. The Wallaroos played the Auckland Storm in a warm-up match at Bell Park on 18 October in Pakuranga.

The Black Ferns thrashed Australia in the first test, which was a double header with the All Blacks and Wallabies, 67–3 at Eden Park. The Wallaroos improved in the second test on the North Shore, but it still wasn't enough, as the Black Ferns retained the Laurie O'Reilly trophy and won the series.

== Table ==
Place	Nation	Games				Points		
Place	Nation	Played	Won	Drawn	Lost	For	Against	Diff
1	New Zealand	2	2	0	0	96	6	+90
2	Australia	2	0	0	2	6	96	−90

== Results ==
=== Game 1 ===
22 October 2016	New Zealand	67–3	Australia	Eden Park, Auckland
17:05 NZDT (UTC+13)	Try: Fiao'o Fa'amausili (2) 4' c, 76' m Chelsea Alley 14' c Kendra Cocksedge 19' c Selica Winiata (4) 24' m, 59' m, 66' m, 78' c Eloise Blackwell 31' m Victoria Subritzky-Nafatali 49' c Honey Hireme 80' c Con: Kendra Cocksedge (4) 4', 14', 19', 49'; Kelly Brazier (2) 78', 80'	Report	Pen: Ashleigh Hewson 10'	Referee: (Spain) Alhambra Nievas

FB	15	Selica Winiata
RW	14	Honey Hireme
OC	13	Portia Woodman
IC	12	Chelsea Alley
LW	11	Renee Wickliffe
FH	10	Victoria Subritzky-Nafatali
SH	9	Kendra Cocksedge
N8	8	Aroha Savage
BF	7	Sarah Goss
OF	6	Rawinia Everitt
RL	5	Charmaine Smith
LL	4	Eloise Blackwell
TP	3	Aleisha Nelson
HK	2	Fiao’o Fa’amausili (c)
LP	1	Pip Love
Replacements:
HK	16	Te Kura Ngata-Aerengamate
PR	17	Aldora Itunu
PR	18	Aotearoa Mata’u
FL	19	Charlene Gubb
FL	20	Charmaine McMenamin
SH	21	Kristina Sue
FH	22	Kelly Brazier
CE	23	Janna Vaughan
Coach:
(New Zealand) Glenn Moore

FB	15	Sarah Riordan
RW	14	Cobie-Jane Morgan
OC	13	Nareta Marsters
IC	12	Hanna Sio
LW	11	Shontelle Stowers
FH	10	Ashleigh Hewson (c)
SH	9	Iliseva Batibasaga
N8	8	Liz Patu
BF	7	Vesinia Schaaf-Tatufa
OF	6	Mollie Gray
RL	5	Chloe Butler
LL	4	Alisha Hewett
TP	3	Hana Ngaha
HK	2	Ivy Kaleta
LP	1	Louise Burrows
Replacements:
HK	16	Alanna Patison
PR	17	Emily Robinson
PR	18	Danielle Meskell
LK	19	Grace Hamilton
FL	20	Kirby Sefo
FL	21	Ariana Kaiwai
SH	22	Katrina Barker
FB	23	Cheyenne Campbell
Coach:
(Australia) Paul Verrell

Notes:

- Ivy Kaleta, Hana Ngaha, Vesinia Schaaf-Tatufa, Shontelle Stowers, Nareta Marsters, Sarah Riordan, Alanna Patison, Emily Robinson, Kirby Sefo, Ariana Kaiwai and Katrina Barker made their international debuts for Australia.
- Aotearoa Mata’u and Kristina Sue of New Zealand made their international debuts.
- Rebecca Clough was ruled out with a leg injury she sustained in the warm up match against Auckland Storm.

=== Game 2 ===
26 October 2016	New Zealand	29–3	Australia	QBE Stadium, North Shore
14:30 NZDT (UTC+13)	Try: Sarah Goss 4' c Honey Hireme 35' m Toka Natua 12' m Portia Woodman 62' c Selica Winiata 71' m Con: Kendra Cocksedge (2/5) 4', 62'	Report	Pen: Ashleigh Hewson 8'	Referee: (Republic of Ireland) Helen O'Reilly

FB	15	Selica Winiata
RW	14	Honey Hireme
OC	13	Portia Woodman
IC	12	Chelsea Alley
LW	11	Renee Wickliffe
FH	10	Kelly Brazier
SH	9	Kendra Cocksedge
N8	8	Aroha Savage
BF	7	Sarah Goss
OF	6	Charmaine McMenamin
RL	5	Charmaine Smith
LL	4	Eloise Blackwell
TP	3	Aleisha Nelson
HK	2	Fiao’o Faamausili (c)
LP	1	Toka Natua
Replacements:
HK	16	Te Kura Ngata-Aerengamate
PR	17	Aldora Itunu
PR	18	Aotearoa Mata’u
FL	19	Charlene Gubb
FL	20	Angie Sisifa
SH	21	Kristina Sue
FH	22	Carla Hohepa
CE	23	Hazel Tubic
Coach:
(Australia) Glenn Moore

FB	15	Chloe Leaupepe
RW	14	Cobie-Jane Morgan
OC	13	Katrina Barker
IC	12	Sarah Riordan
LW	11	Madeline Putz
FH	10	Ashleigh Hewson
SH	9	Iliseva Batibasaga
N8	8	Mollie Gray
BF	7	Ariana Kaiwai
OF	6	Grace Hamilton
RL	5	Chloe Butler
LL	4	Alisha Hewett
TP	3	Hana Ngaha
HK	2	Alisha Hewett
LP	1	Hana Ngaha
Replacements:
HK	16	Ivy Kaleta
PR	17	Emily Robinson
PR	18	Danielle Meskell
LK	19	Michelle Bailey
FL	20	Liz Patu
FL	21	Kirby Sefo
SH	22	Nareta Marsters
FB	23	Cheyenne Campbell
Coach:
(Australia) Paul Verrell

Notes:

- Pip Love suffered an ACL injuryin the first Test bringing her season to an end.
- Grace Hamilton made her run-on debut.

== Squads ==
=== Australia ===
Head Coach Paul Verrell named a 26-player squad. Oneata Schwalger and Victoria Latu, were late withdrawals from the squad due to injury and were replaced by Danielle Meskell and Grace Hamilton. Michelle Bailey was called up into the squad.

*Uncapped Players

Player	Position	Club
Katrina Barker*	Scrum-half/ centre	Warringah
Iliseva Batibasaga	Scrum-half	Sydney University
Louise Burrows	Front Row	Canberra Royals
Chloe Butler	Lock	Parramatta
Cheyenne Campbell	Centre	Redlands
Rebecca Clough	Lock	Cottesloe
Mollie Gray	Backrow	Sydney University
Alisha Hewett	Lock	GPS
Ashleigh Hewson	Fly-half / fullback	Sydney University
Ariana Kaiwai*	Flanker	Blacktown
Ivy Kaleta*	Hooker	Sunnybank
Victoria Latu	Backrow	Parramatta
Chloe Leaupepe*	Fly-half / fullback	Oatley
Nareta Marsters*	Centre / wing	Sunnybank
Cobie-Jane Morgan	Scrum-half/ centre / wing	Warringah
Hana Ngaha*	Prop	Sunnybank
Alanna Patison	Front Row	Newcastle University
Liz Patu	Prop / Backrow	Wests
Madeline Putz	Wing	Palmyra
Sarah Riordan*	Fullback / centre	Merewether Carlton
Emily Robinson*	Front Row	Warringah
Oneata Schwalger	Prop	Melbourne
Kirby Sefo*	Lock / Flanker	Sunnybank
Hanna Sio	Centre	Parramatta
Shontelle Stowers*	Utility Back	Warringah
Venisia Taufa*	Loose forward	Palmyra

=== New Zealand ===
Head Coach Glenn Moore named a 28-player squad.

*Uncapped Players

Player	Position	Province
Chelsea Alley	Centre	North Harbour
Kelly Brazier	Utility Back	Otago
Kendra Cocksedge	Scrum-half	Canterbury
Honey Hireme	Utility Back	Waikato
Carla Hohepa	Wing / centre	Waikato
Victoria Subritzky-Nafatali	Fly-half	Counties Manukau
Kristina Sue*	Scrum-half	Manawatu
Hazel Tubic	Fullback	Counties Manukau
Janna Vaughan	Utility Back	Manawatu
Renee Wickliffe	Wing	Counties Manukau
Selica Winiata	Utility Back	Manawatu
Portia Woodman	Wing	Counties Manukau
Eloise Blackwell	Lock	Auckland
Rawinia Everitt	Loose forward	Counties Manukau
Fiao'o Fa'amausili	Hooker	Auckland
Sarah Goss	Loose forward	Manawatu
Charlene Gubb	Lock	Auckland
Aldora Itunu	Prop	Auckland
Pip Love	Prop	Canterbury
Aotearoa Mata’u*	Prop / Loose forward	
Charmaine McMenamin	Loose forward	Auckland
Toka Natua	Prop	Waikato
Aleisha Nelson	Prop	Auckland
Te Kura Ngata-Aerengamate	Front Row	
Aroha Savage	Loose forward	Counties Manukau
Angie Sisifa	Loose forward	Otago
Charmaine Smith	Lock	North Harbour
Sharnita Woodman	Centre / Flanker	Counties Manukau
