= England women at the Rugby World Cup =

The England women's national rugby union team have played 45 matches at the Women's Rugby World Cup tournaments from 1991 to 2025. They have won three tournaments – 1994, 2014 and 2025. They have also finished as runners-up in six tournaments – 1991, 2002, 2006, 2010, 2017 and 2021. They have been in every final at the tournament except for 1998, where they placed third.

England hosted the 2010 Women's Rugby World Cup.

England hosted the 2025 Women's Rugby World Cup, which took place from 22 August 2025 to 27 September 2025.

England will next compete at the 2029 Women’s Rugby World Cup in Australia after winning the 2025 edition.

== By year ==
Rugby World Cup record
| Year | Round | Pld | W | D | L | PF | PA | Squad | Head coach |
|---|---|---|---|---|---|---|---|---|---|
| (Wales) 1991 | Runners–up | 4 | 3 | 0 | 1 | 56 | 28 | Squad | S. Dowling |
| (Scotland) 1994 | Champions | 5 | 5 | 0 | 0 | 172 | 39 | Squad | S. Dowling |
| (Netherlands) 1998 | Third place | 5 | 4 | 0 | 1 | 219 | 78 | Squad | E. Field |
| (Spain) 2002 | Runners–up | 4 | 3 | 0 | 1 | 138 | 37 | Squad | G. Richards |
| (Canada) 2006 | Runners–up | 5 | 4 | 0 | 1 | 146 | 47 | Squad | G. Richards |
| (England) 2010 | Runners–up | 5 | 4 | 0 | 1 | 171 | 23 | Squad | G. Street |
| (France) 2014 | Champions | 5 | 4 | 1 | 0 | 184 | 37 | Squad | G. Street |
| (Ireland) 2017 | Runners–up | 5 | 4 | 0 | 1 | 211 | 88 | Squad | S. Middleton |
| (New Zealand) 2021 | Runners–up | 6 | 5 | 0 | 1 | 270 | 84 | Squad | S. Middleton |
| (England) 2025 | Champions | 6 | 6 | 0 | 0 | 316 | 55 | Squad | J. Mitchell |
| (Australia) 2029 | Qualified as 2025 Women's Rugby World Cup semi-finalists | | | | | | | | |
| (United States) 2033 | To be determined | | | | | | | | |
| Total | Champions (3)^{†} | 50 | 42 | 1 | 7 | 1803 | 506 | — | |
Champion Runner-up Third place Fourth place: * Tied placing ^{†} Best placing / Home venue

== 1991 Women's Rugby World Cup ==
=== Pool stage ===
| 6 April 1991 | England | 12–0 | Spain | Swansea |

| 8 April 1991 | England | 25–9 | Italy | Llanharan |

| Team | Won | Drawn | Lost | For | Against |
|---|---|---|---|---|---|
| England | 2 | 0 | 0 | 37 | 9 |
| Spain | 1 | 0 | 1 | 13 | 19 |
| Italy | 0 | 0 | 2 | 16 | 25 |

=== Knockout stage ===
| 12 May 1991 | England | 13–0 | France | Cardiff Arms Park |

| 14 May 1991 | England | 6–19 | United States | Cardiff Arms Park |

== 1994 Women's Rugby World Cup ==
=== Pool stage ===
| 11 April 1994 | England | 66–0 | Russia | Boroughmuir |

| 15 April 1994 | Scotland | 0–26 | England | Boroughmuir |

| Team | Won | Drawn | Lost | For | Against |
|---|---|---|---|---|---|
| England | 2 | 0 | 0 | 92 | 0 |
| Scotland | 1 | 0 | 1 | 51 | 26 |
| Russia | 0 | 0 | 2 | 0 | 117 |

=== Knockout stage ===
| 17 April 1994 | England | 24–10 | Canada | Gala |

| 20 April 1994 | England | 18–6 | France | Gala |

| 24 April 1994 | England | 38–23 | United States | Edinburgh Academicals RFC |

== 1998 Women's Rugby World Cup ==
=== Pool stage ===
| 2 May 1998 | England | 75–0 | Sweden | Amsterdam |

| 5 May 1998 | England | 72–6 | Canada | Amsterdam |

| Team | Won | Drawn | Lost | For | Against | Ladder |
|---|---|---|---|---|---|---|
| England | 2 | 0 | 0 | 147 | 6 | 2nd |
| Canada | 1 | 0 | 1 | 22 | 79 | 8th |
| Netherlands | 1 | 0 | 1 | 51 | 16 | 10th |
| Sweden | 0 | 0 | 2 | 0 | 139 | 15th |

=== Knockout stage ===
| 9 May 1998 | England | 30–13 | Australia | Amsterdam |

| 12 May 1998 | England | 11–44 | New Zealand | Amsterdam |

== 2002 Women's Rugby World Cup ==
=== Pool stage ===
| 13 May 2002 | England | 63–9 | Italy | Cornellà de Llobregat, Barcelona |

| 18 May 2002 | England | 13–5 | Spain | Cornellà de Llobregat, Barcelona |

| Position | Nation | Games | | | | Points | | Table points | Overall ranking |
| Position | Nation | played | won | drawn | lost | for | against | Table points | Overall ranking |
|---|---|---|---|---|---|---|---|---|---|
| 1 | England | 2 | 2 | 0 | 0 | 76 | 14 | 6 | 3rd |
| 2 | Spain | 2 | 1 | 0 | 1 | 67 | 13 | 4 | 6th |
| 3 | Italy | 2 | 1 | 0 | 1 | 39 | 66 | 4 | 12th |
| 4 | Japan | 2 | 0 | 0 | 2 | 3 | 92 | 2 | 15th |

=== Knockout stage ===
| 21 May 2002 | England | 53–10 | Canada | Girona, Barcelona |

| 25 May 2002 | England | 9–19 | New Zealand | Olympic Stadium, Barcelona |
| | Pen: Shelley Rae (2); Drop: Shelley Rae | | Try: Monique Hirovanaa, Cheryl Waaka; Pen: Tammi Wilson (3) |

== 2006 Women's Rugby World Cup ==
=== Pool stage ===
| 31 August 2006 | England | 18–0 | United States | St. Albert Rugby Park, St. Albert |

| 4 September 2006 | England | 74–8 | South Africa | Ellerslie Rugby Park, Edmonton |

| 8 September 2006 | England | 27–8 | France | Ellerslie Rugby Park, Edmonton |

Pool B ⇔ Pool C

| Pool | Team | Won | Drawn | Lost | For | Against | Points |
|---|---|---|---|---|---|---|---|
| B | England | 3 | 0 | 0 | 119 | 16 | 14 |
| C | France | 2 | 0 | 1 | 75 | 37 | 10 |
| C | United States | 2 | 0 | 1 | 34 | 35 | 9 |
| B | Australia | 1 | 0 | 2 | 88 | 42 | 6 |
| B | Ireland | 1 | 0 | 2 | 48 | 67 | 5 |
| C | South Africa | 0 | 0 | 3 | 20 | 179 | 0 |

=== Knockout stage ===
| 12 September 2006 | England | 20–14 | Canada | Ellerslie Rugby Park, Edmonton |

| 17 September 2006 | England | 17–25 | New Zealand | Commonwealth Stadium, Edmonton |

== 2010 Women's Rugby World Cup ==
=== Pool stage ===
| 20 August 2010 | England | 27–0 | Ireland | Surrey Sports Park, Guildford, South East England |
| | Try: Pocock 9'; Merchant 37'; Turner 56'; Alphonsi 79'; Con: McLean (2) 10', 80'; Pen: McLean 75' | Report | | Referee: Sarah Corrigan (Australia) |

| 24 August 2010 | England | 82–0 | Kazakhstan | Surrey Sports Park, Guildford, South East England |
| | Try: Pocock (3) 4', 54', 63'; Barras (3) 10', 22', 79'; Beale 25'; Merchant 34'; Burford 38'; Mason 44'; Crowley 67'; Penrith 74'; Con: McLean (7) 5', 11', 22', 26', 35', 39', 45'; Mason (4) 55', 64', 67', 75' | Report | | Referee: Javier Mancuso (Argentina) |

| 28 August 2010 | England | 37–10 | United States | Surrey Sports Park, Guildford, South East England |
| | Try: Waterman (2) 4', 38'; Merchant 30'; Scarratt 51'; Penrith 68'; Alphonsi 76'; Con: McLean (2) 39', 77'; Pen: McLean 9' | Report | Try: Marchino 18'; Magrini 24' | Referee: Clare Daniels (England) |

| Po | Nation | Pl | Wo | Dr | Lo | Pf | Pa | Pd | Tf | Ta | Bp | Tp |
|---|---|---|---|---|---|---|---|---|---|---|---|---|
| 1 | England | 3 | 3 | 0 | 0 | 146 | 10 | +136 | 22 | 2 | 3 | 15 |
| 2 | Ireland | 3 | 2 | 0 | 1 | 59 | 42 | +17 | 11 | 6 | 2 | 10 |
| 3 | United States | 3 | 1 | 0 | 2 | 73 | 59 | +14 | 11 | 10 | 1 | 5 |
| 4 | Kazakhstan | 3 | 0 | 0 | 3 | 3 | 170 | −167 | 0 | 26 | 0 | 0 |

=== Knockout stage ===
| 1 September 2010 | England | 15–0 | Australia | Twickenham Stoop |
| | Try: Spencer 6'; Waterman 22'; Con: McLean 7'; Pen: Richardson 78' | Report | | Referee: Nicky Inwood (New Zealand) |

| 5 September 2010 | New Zealand | 13–10 | England | Twickenham Stoop |
| | Try: Hohepa 33'; Con: Brazier 34'; Pen: Brazier (2) 56', 66' | | Try: Barras 61'; Pen: McLean 43'; Con: McLean 62' | Referee: Sarah Corrigan (Australia) |

== 2014 Women's Rugby World Cup ==
=== Pool stage ===
| 1 August 2014 | England | 65–3 | Samoa | CNR, Marcoussis Pitch 1 |
| | | Report | | Referee: (Australia) Amy Perrett |

| 5 August 2014 | England | 45–5 | Spain | CNR, Marcoussis Pitch 1 |
| | | Report | | Referee: (New Zealand) Jess Beard |

| 9 August 2014 | England | 13–13 | Canada | CNR, Marcoussis Pitch 1 |
| | | Report | | Referee: (Australia) Amy Perrett |

| Team | Pld | W | D | L | TF | PF | PA | +/− | BP | Pts |
|---|---|---|---|---|---|---|---|---|---|---|
| England | 3 | 2 | 1 | 0 | 17 | 123 | 21 | +102 | 2 | 12 |
| Canada | 3 | 2 | 1 | 0 | 12 | 86 | 25 | +61 | 2 | 12 |
| Spain | 3 | 1 | 0 | 2 | 8 | 51 | 81 | −30 | 1 | 5 |
| Samoa | 3 | 0 | 0 | 3 | 2 | 15 | 148 | −133 | 0 | 0 |

=== Knockout stage ===
| 13 August 2014 | Ireland | 7–40 | England | Stade Jean-Bouin, Paris, France |
| 18:00 | Try: Miller 16'; Con: Briggs 16' | Report | Try: Clark 25'; Merchant 36'; Wilson 57'; Packer (2) 70', 74'; Con: Scarratt 36'; Large (2) 70', 74'; Pen: Scarratt (3) 33', 40', 47' | Referee: (Australia) Amy Perrett |

| 17 August 2014 | England | 21–9 | Canada | Stade Jean-Bouin, Paris, France |
| 18:45 | Try: Waterman 33'; Scarratt 74'; Con: Scarratt 74'; Pen: Scarratt (3) 11', 25', 60' | Report | Pen: Harvey (3) 40', 45', 58' | Referee: (Australia) Amy Perrett |

== 2017 Women's Rugby World Cup ==
=== Pool stage ===
| 9 August 2017 | England | 56–5 | Spain | UCD Bowl, Dublin |
| 14:00 | | Report |

| 13 August 2017 | England | 56–13 | Italy | Billings Park UCD, Dublin |
| 14:30 | | Report |

| 17 August 2017 | England | 47–26 | United States | Billings Park UCD, Dublin |
| 12:00 | | Report |

| Team | Pld | W | D | L | TF | PF | PA | +/− | BP | Pts |
|---|---|---|---|---|---|---|---|---|---|---|
| England | 3 | 3 | 0 | 0 | 27 | 159 | 44 | +115 | 3 | 15 |
| United States | 3 | 2 | 0 | 1 | 15 | 93 | 59 | +34 | 3 | 11 |
| Spain | 3 | 1 | 0 | 2 | 4 | 27 | 107 | −80 | 0 | 4 |
| Italy | 3 | 0 | 0 | 3 | 5 | 33 | 102 | −69 | 0 | 0 |

=== Knockout stage ===
| 22 August 2017 | England | 20–3 | France | Kingspan Stadium, Belfast |
| 18:45 GMT (UTC+00) | | Report |

| 26 August 2017 | England | 32–41 | New Zealand | Kingspan Stadium, Belfast |
| 18:45 GMT (UTC+00) | Try: Penalty try 25'; Thompson (2) 32', 55'; Noel-Smith 77'; Con: Scarratt (2) 33', 78'; Pen: Scarratt (2) 15', 51' | Report | Try: Winiata (2) 8', 69'; Natua (3) 39', 45', 58'; Smith 53'; Cocksedge 63'; Con: Cocksedge (3) 46', 54', 58' | Attendance: 17,115; Referee: Joy Neville |

== 2021 Women's Rugby World Cup ==
=== Pool stage ===
| 8 October 2022 | Fiji | 19–84 | England | Eden Park, Auckland |
| 16:45 NZDT (UTC+13) | Try: Nakoci 31' c Donu 40' c Cavuru 80+1' m Con: Cavuru (2/3) 32', 43' | Report | Try: MacDonald (4) 5' m, 56' m, 70' m, 76' c Cokayne (2) 18' m, 42' m Ward 27' c Rowland 38' c Aldcroft 45' c Thompson (2) 50' c, 53' m Dow 59' c Infante 65' m Powell 74' c Con: Scarratt (5/9) 28', 39', 46', 51', 60'; Harrison (2/5) 75', 78' | Referee: Aurélie Groizeleau (France) |

| 15 October 2022 | France | 7–13 | England | Northland Events Centre, Whangārei |
| 20:00 NZDT (UTC+13) | Try: Hermet 64' c Con: Drouin (1/1) 65' | Report | Try: Scarratt 25' c Con: Scarratt (1/1) 26'; Pen: Scarratt (2/2) 40', 62' | Referee: Joy Neville (Ireland) |

| 23 October 2022 | England | 75–0 | South Africa | Waitakere Stadium, Auckland |
| 17:45 NZDT (UTC+13) | Try: Galligan (3) 6' m, 29' m, 53' m Cleall (2) 23' c, 59' m Brown 32' c Powell (3) 36' m, 41' c, 69' m M. Packer 51' c Kabeya (2) 62' m, 78' c Dow 64' m Con: Harrison (4/8) 24', 33', 42', 51'; Rowland (1/1) 78' | Report | | Referee: Lauren Jenner (New Zealand) |

| Pos | Team | Pld | W | D | L | PF | PA | PD | T | B | Pts |
|---|---|---|---|---|---|---|---|---|---|---|---|
| 1 | England | 3 | 3 | 0 | 0 | 172 | 26 | +146 | 28 | 2 | 14 |
| 2 | France | 3 | 2 | 0 | 1 | 91 | 18 | +73 | 14 | 3 | 11 |
| 3 | Fiji | 3 | 1 | 0 | 2 | 40 | 145 | −105 | 6 | 0 | 4 |
| 4 | South Africa | 3 | 0 | 0 | 3 | 22 | 136 | −114 | 3 | 1 | 1 |

=== Knockout stage ===
| 30 October 2022 | England | 41–5 | Australia | Waitakere Stadium, Auckland |
| 13:30 NZDT (UTC+13) | Try: Hunter 8' c M. Packer (3) 30' m, 39' c, 80' c Ward 43' m Cokayne 53' m Matthews 65' m Con: Scarratt (2/6) 9', 39'; Rowland (1/1) 80' | Report | Try: Chancellor 40' m | Referee: Maggie Cogger-Orr (New Zealand) |

| 5 November 2022 | Canada | 19–26 | England | Eden Park, Auckland |
| 16:30 NZDT (UTC+13) | Try: Paquin 19' m Corrigan 35' c Beukeboom 68' c Con: De Goede (2/3) 36', 68' | Report | Try: M. Packer 8' c Dow (2) 15' m, 50' m Con: Scarratt (1/3) 10'; Pen: Scarratt (3/3) 40', 43', 71' | Referee: Aimee Barrett-Theron (South Africa) |

| 12 November 2022 | England | 31–34 | New Zealand | Eden Park, Auckland |
| 19:30 NZST (UTC+13:00) | Try: Kildunne 3' c Cokayne (3) 13' c, 32' c, 54' m M. Packer 21' m Con: Scarratt (3/5) 4', 15', 33' | Report | Try: Ponsonby 18' c I'iga (2) 25' c, 71' m Rule 40' m Fluhler 41' m Murray 49' m Con: Holmes (2/6) 20, 26' | Attendance: 43,759; Referee: Hollie Davidson (Scotland) |

== 2025 Women's Rugby World Cup ==
=== Pool stage ===
| 22 August 2025 | England | 69–7 | United States | Stadium of Light, Sunderland |
| 19:30 BST (UTC+1) | Try: Kabeya 9' c Botterman 19' c Muir 33' c Kildunne (2) 35' c, 49' c Dow 43' m Cokayne 52' m Breach (2) 57' m, 65' m Atkin-Davies (2) 60' c, 75' c Con: Harrison (6/9) 10', 20', 34', 36', 50', 61'; Sing (1/1) 76' | Report | Try: Jarrell-Searcy 25' c Con: Hawkins (1/1) 26' | Attendance: 42,723; Referee: Aimee Barrett-Theron (South Africa) |

| 30 August 2025 | England | 92–3 | Samoa | Franklin's Gardens, Northampton |
| 17:00 BST (UTC+1) | Try: Jones (2) 3' c, 16' m Breach (3) 8' c, 53' c, 74' m Bern 14' c Feaunati 24' c Atkin-Davies 29' c L. Packer 33' c Clifford 50' c Carson 60' c Rowland 64' c M. Packer 70' m Moloney-MacDonald 80' c Con: Rowland (11/14) 4', 9', 15', 25', 30', 34', 51', 54', 61', 65', 80+1' | Report | Pen: Vatau (1/1) 44' | Attendance: 13,615; Referee: Maggie Cogger-Orr (New Zealand) |

| 6 September 2025 | England | 47–7 | Australia | Brighton & Hove Albion Stadium, Brighton |
| 17:00 BST (UTC+1) | Try: Breach 8' m Ward 32' c Kabeya (2) 38' c, 44' c Clifford (2) 53' c, 58' c Bern 65' c Con: Harrison (6/7) 33', 39', 45', 54', 59', 66' | Report | Try: Talakai 6' c Con: Wood (1/1) 7' | Attendance: 30,433; Referee: Aurélie Groizeleau (France) |

| Pos | Team | Pld | W | D | L | PF | PA | PD | TF | TA | TB | LB | Pts |
|---|---|---|---|---|---|---|---|---|---|---|---|---|---|
| 1 | England | 3 | 3 | 0 | 0 | 208 | 17 | +191 | 32 | 2 | 3 | 0 | 15 |
| 2 | Australia | 3 | 1 | 1 | 1 | 111 | 78 | +33 | 17 | 12 | 2 | 0 | 8 |
| 3 | United States | 3 | 1 | 1 | 1 | 98 | 100 | −2 | 16 | 16 | 2 | 0 | 8 |
| 4 | Samoa | 3 | 0 | 0 | 3 | 3 | 225 | −222 | 0 | 35 | 0 | 0 | 0 |

Updated to match(es) played on 6 September 2025. Source:

=== Knockout stage ===
| 14 September 2025 | England | 40–8 | Scotland | Ashton Gate, Bristol |
| 16:00 BST (UTC+1) | Try: Clifford (2) 12' c, 40' c Talling 15' c Dow 31' m Cokayne 46' c Aitchison 64' c Con: Aitchison (5/6) 13', 16', 40+1', 47', 65' | Report | Try: Lloyd 80+2' m Pen: Nelson (1/1) 4' | Attendance: 25,295; Referee: Aurélie Groizeleau (France) |

| 20 September 2025 | France | 17–35 | England | Ashton Gate, Bristol |
| 16:00 BST (UTC+1) | Try: Konde (2) 24' m, 73' m Arbey 52' c Con: Bourgeois (1/3) 53' | Report | Try: Kildunne (2) 5' c, 69' c Cokayne 46' c Ward 59' c Jones 79' c Con: Harrison (5/5) 6', 47', 60', 70', 80' | Attendance: 25,478; Referee: Maggie Cogger-Orr (New Zealand) |

| 27 September 2025 | Canada | 13–33 | England | Twickenham Stadium, London |
| 16:00 BST (UTC+1) | Try: Hogan-Rochester (2) 5' m, 53' m Pen: de Goede (1/1) 34' | Report | Try: Kildunne 8' c Cokayne 19' c Matthews (2) 26' c, 69' c Ward 50' m Con: Harrison (4/5) 9', 20', 27', 70' | Attendance: 81,885; Referee: Hollie Davidson (Scotland) |

== 2029 Women’s Rugby World Cup ==
TBA

== Overall record ==
As of 27 September 2025

| Country | P | W | D | L | PF | PA | W % |
|---|---|---|---|---|---|---|---|
| Australia | 4 | 4 | 0 | 0 | 133 | 25 | 100 |
| Canada | 9 | 8 | 1 | 0 | 283 | 101 | 88.9 |
| Fiji | 1 | 1 | 0 | 0 | 84 | 19 | 100 |
| France | 6 | 6 | 0 | 0 | 126 | 41 | 100 |
| Ireland | 2 | 2 | 0 | 0 | 67 | 7 | 100 |
| Italy | 3 | 3 | 0 | 0 | 144 | 31 | 100 |
| Kazakhstan | 1 | 1 | 0 | 0 | 82 | 0 | 100 |
| New Zealand | 6 | 0 | 0 | 6 | 110 | 176 | 0 |
| Russia | 1 | 1 | 0 | 0 | 66 | 0 | 100 |
| Samoa | 2 | 2 | 0 | 0 | 157 | 6 | 100 |
| Scotland | 2 | 2 | 0 | 0 | 66 | 8 | 100 |
| South Africa | 2 | 2 | 0 | 0 | 149 | 8 | 100 |
| Sweden | 1 | 1 | 0 | 0 | 75 | 0 | 100 |
| Spain | 4 | 4 | 0 | 0 | 126 | 15 | 100 |
| United States | 6 | 5 | 0 | 1 | 209 | 66 | 83.3 |
| Total | 50 | 42 | 1 | 7 | 1,803 | 506 | 84 |

== See also ==
• England at the Rugby World Cup
