= 2017 Women's Rugby World Cup final =

Rugby union match

2017 Women's Rugby World Cup Final
- Event: 2017 Women's Rugby World Cup
New Zealand	England
(New Zealand)	(England)
41	32
- Date: 26 August 2017
- Venue: Kingspan Stadium, Belfast
- Player of the Match: Toka Natua
- Referee: Joy Neville (Ireland)
- Attendance: 17,115

The 2017 Women's Rugby World Cup Final was a rugby union match to determine the winner of the 2017 Women's Rugby World Cup, played between reigning champions England and New Zealand on 26 August 2017 at Kingspan Stadium in Belfast. New Zealand won the Rugby World Cup for a record fifth time, beating England 41–32.

== Route to the final ==
New Zealand
Round
England
Opponent
Result
Pool stage
Opponent
Result
Wales
44–12
Match 1
Spain
56–5
Hong Kong
121–0
Match 2
Italy
56–13
Canada
48–5
Match 3
United States
47–26

Team	Pld	W	D	L	TF	PF	PA	+/−	BP	Pts
New Zealand	3	3	0	0	35	213	17	+196	3	15
Canada	3	2	0	1	19	118	48	+70	1	9
Wales	3	1	0	2	9	51	74	−23	1	5
Hong Kong	3	0	0	3	2	15	258	−243	0	0

Final standing

Team	Pld	W	D	L	TF	PF	PA	+/−	BP	Pts
England	3	3	0	0	27	159	44	+115	3	15
United States	3	2	0	1	15	93	59	+34	3	11
Spain	3	1	0	2	4	27	107	−80	0	4
Italy	3	0	0	3	5	33	102	−69	0	0

Opponent
Result
Knockout stage
Opponent
Result
United States
45–12
Semi-finals
France
20–3

England was the only team in the competition to be made up of professional rugby players, whereas New Zealand had just six players contracted.

New Zealand was placed in Pool A with Canada, Hong Kong and Wales. England was in Pool B alongside USA, Spain and Italy. On 10 August England played their first game of the tournament against Spain and ran in ten tries, including a hat-trick to Kay Wilson, to record a 56–5 victory. New Zealand played Wales the same day and led 20–0 at half time before extending the final margin to 44–12, with Selica Winiata scoring a hat-trick of her own. New Zealand continued their dominance with a 121–0 thrashing of Hong Kong in their next game. They scored 19 tries in total, with eight of them coming from winger Portia Woodman. England's second match saw them score the same number of tries and points as their first one as they downed Italy 56–13. Despite the two victories, concerns were raised over their kicking as in both matches they only converted three of the ten tries. England's final pool game was against the USA and they played a dominant first half to lead 33–7, before the Americans fought back to a close the final score to 47–36. The result meant that both teams would advance to the semi-finals. New Zealand played Canada in their last pool game and with another hat-trick, this time from front rower Aldora Itunu, New Zealand came away 48–5 victors.

In the semi-finals New Zealand took on USA and England played Pool C winner France. The USA team put in a good first half effort to only trail by eight points going into the break. They visibly fatigued in the second half though and New Zealand pulled away to claim a 45–12 victory. New Zealand scored seven tries in total, with Woodman again starring with four of them. Kelly Brazier was named Player of the Match for her playmaking and ball handling skills. England overcame France 20–3 in their semi-final. At half time, nothing separated the two teams as they each scored a solitary penalty in wet Belfast conditions. In the second half, two 20 year-olds (Sarah Bern and Megan Jones) scored the games only tries and put the game out of France's reach. It was a much closer match than the final score indicated, with Jones's try coming in the final minutes and not long after the French had narrowly missed scoring one themselves.

== Match ==
26 August 2017
19:45 BST (UTC+00)

England	32–41	New Zealand
Try: Penalty Try 25'; Thompson (2) 32', 55'; Noel-Smith 77'; Con: Scarratt 33', 78'; Pen: Scarratt 15', 51'	Report	Try: Winiata (2) 8', 69'; Natua (3) 39', 45', 58'; Smith 53'; Cocksedge 63'; Con: Cocksedge 46', 54', 58'

Kingspan Stadium, Belfast
Attendance: 17,115
Referee: Joy Neville (Ireland)

Assistant referees:

Hollie Davidson (Scotland)

Graham Cooper (Australia)

Television match official:

Simon McDowell (Ireland)

=== Summary ===
England won the battle up front in the first half, holding onto possession and keeping New Zealand inside their 22 for most of it. However, New Zealand were the first to score when a cross-field kick from Victoria Subritzky-Nafatali was claimed by Selica Winiata setting up her first try. Emily Scarratt, who was playing at fullback instead of in her regular center spot, responded by making a break into New Zealand's 22 and then scored a penalty from a resulting dangerous tackle. In the 20th minute New Zealand's Sarah Goss was sin-binned for a tip tackle on Katy McLean and England nearly scored only for Alex Matthews to be held up over the tryline. They were eventually rewarded for their dominance, earning a penalty try from the resulting scrum. Lydia Thompson scored England's second try seven minutes later following a break from Rachael Burford. Just before half time New Zealand finally secured enough possession to string together some attacking phases, allowing prop Toka Natua to score. Despite the early momentum being with England, New Zealand trailed by just seven points at half time.

New Zealand played a much better second half. After being awarded a penalty early, they chose to kick to the corner and from the resulting lineout, Subritzky-Nafatali helped set up Natua's second try of the evening. With a successful conversion the scores were now level. England worked their way back into New Zealands half and were awarded a penalty that Scarratt managed to convert to edge them ahead. Lock Charmaine Smith pulled New Zealand ahead with a try in the 53rd minute, before England struck back through another Thompson score. England held a narrow one point lead. Three minutes later Natua scored her hat-trick try, then Kendra Cocksedge and Winiata crossed in quick succession to give New Zealand a 16-point lead with 11 minutes to play. With four minutes remaining Lesley Ketu was sin binned helping Izzy Noel-Smith score a consolation try for England near the end. The final score was 41–32 and New Zealand had won their fifth title to go with 1998, 2002, 2006 and 2010 victories.

Natua was named player of the match for her three tries. New Zealand's captain Fiao'o Fa'amausili was proud of how her team got themselves back into the game, while England's captain Sarah Hunter complimented New Zealand on their second half performance.
