= Manukura =

New Zealand Māori sports academy

Location
- Massey University; Kura Awa; Centennial Drive; Palmerston North 4410; New Zealand

Information
- Former name: Tū Toa
- Type: Co-educational designated character school (Year 9 to 13)
- Established: 2005
- Principal: Nathan Durie
- Enrolment: 191
- Website: www.manukura.school.nz

Manukura is a co-educational designated character school for Year 9 to 13 students. It is based at Massey University in Palmerston North, New Zealand. It is effectively a sports academy specialising in Māori students. The school was founded in 2005 and was originally known as Tū Toa. The school has programmes in netball, basketball, rugby union and rugby sevens. Yvette McCausland-Durie was a co-founder of the school, and is also a member of its board of trustees.

== Location ==
Manukura is based at Massey University in Palmerston North, New Zealand. It was originally based at the Hokowhitu campus. However, in August 2018 the school was awarded $20 million by the New Zealand Government to build a new school at the Manawatū campus. A further $11.6m of funding was announced in 2021.

== History ==
=== Tū Toa ===
Tū Toa was founded in 2005, opening with just with 10 students and was originally a correspondence school. Its founders included brothers, Dr Rawiri Durie and Nathan Matawha Durie and his wife, Yvette McCausland-Durie. McCausland-Durie had previously taught in Auckland and at Palmerston North Girls' High School. Nathan Durie was a deputy head at St Stephen's College, Auckland, and had previously taught at Hamilton Boys' High School and Palmerston North Boys' High School. His brother, Dr Ra Durie, specialises in sports medicine. The trio were frustrated with the underachievement of Māori students and wanted to try something new. By 2009, Tū Toa had a roll of 25. 2005 also saw the establishment of the Tū Toa Charitable Trust, chaired by the brothers' uncle, Mason Durie, to oversee the governance of the school.

=== Manukura ===
By 2013, the parents, teachers and school stakeholders at Tū Toa had become divided on "philosophical differences" about how the school was managed. This saw Dr Ra Durie leaving the Massey University campus and establishing a separate school, Tai Wānanga Tū Toa, in Aokautere. Meanwhile, Yvette McCausland-Durie and Nathan Durie, along with other members of the school's education leadership, stayed at the original Hokowhitu site and reformed as Manukura. The Tū Toa Charitable Trust aligned itself with Manukura.

== Enrolment ==
As of July 2026, Manukura has roll of 191 students, of which 182 (95.3%) identify as Māori.

As of 2026, the school has an Equity Index of 494, placing it amongst schools whose students have many socioeconomic barriers to achievement (roughly equivalent to deciles 2 and 3 under the former socio-economic decile system).

== Sports ==
=== Netball ===
Netball was the school's founding sports programme and Yvette McCausland-Durie was its original head coach. Since 2005, the school has entered teams in local, regional and national competitions. These include the Lower North Island Secondary School Netball (LNISSN) competition, the Lion Foundation New Zealand Secondary School Tournament (NZSS) and Netball Manawatū competitions. Tū Toa won the LNISSN Tournament in 2005, 2006 and 2007 and were runners-up in 2008. At the NZSS Tournament they finished third and fourth respectively in 2005 and 2006. In 2007 they finished third and in 2008 they were placed fifth. In 2009, McCausland-Durie guided Tū Toa to their first NZSS title, In the grand final they defeated Mount Albert Grammar School 34–33. They were subsequently named the 2009 Māori Sports Team of the Year. In 2011, McCausland-Durie guided Tū Toa to their first Netball Manawatū Premier title. In the grand final at Arena Manawatu they defeated Rāhui 46–38.

=== Rugby union ===
Rugby union was introduced at Tū Toa in 2011, starting with one under-15 boys team. In 2015 the school introduced their first ever girls rugby union team. The girls' rugby programme began with 12 girls playing in a 10-a-side competition. In 2017 Kristina Sue was appointed head of the girls rugby programme. She subsequently led the Manukura girls 1st XV to a national top four final in just her first year of coaching.

=== Basketball ===
A boys' basketball team was introduced in 2015 and a girls' team was added in 2017.

== Notable alumni ==
Netball

- Te Amo Amaru-Tibble
- Kiley Hikawai
- Sam Durie-Aranga
- Alanah Cassidy
- Sheridan Bignall
- Brooke Leaver
- Renee Te Riini

Rugby union

- Charmaine Smith
- Ere Enari
- Manaaki Selby-Rickit
- Otere Black

== Notable coaches ==
Netball

- Yvette McCausland-Durie

Rugby union

- Janna Vaughan
- Kristina Sue
