= England at the Rugby World Cup =

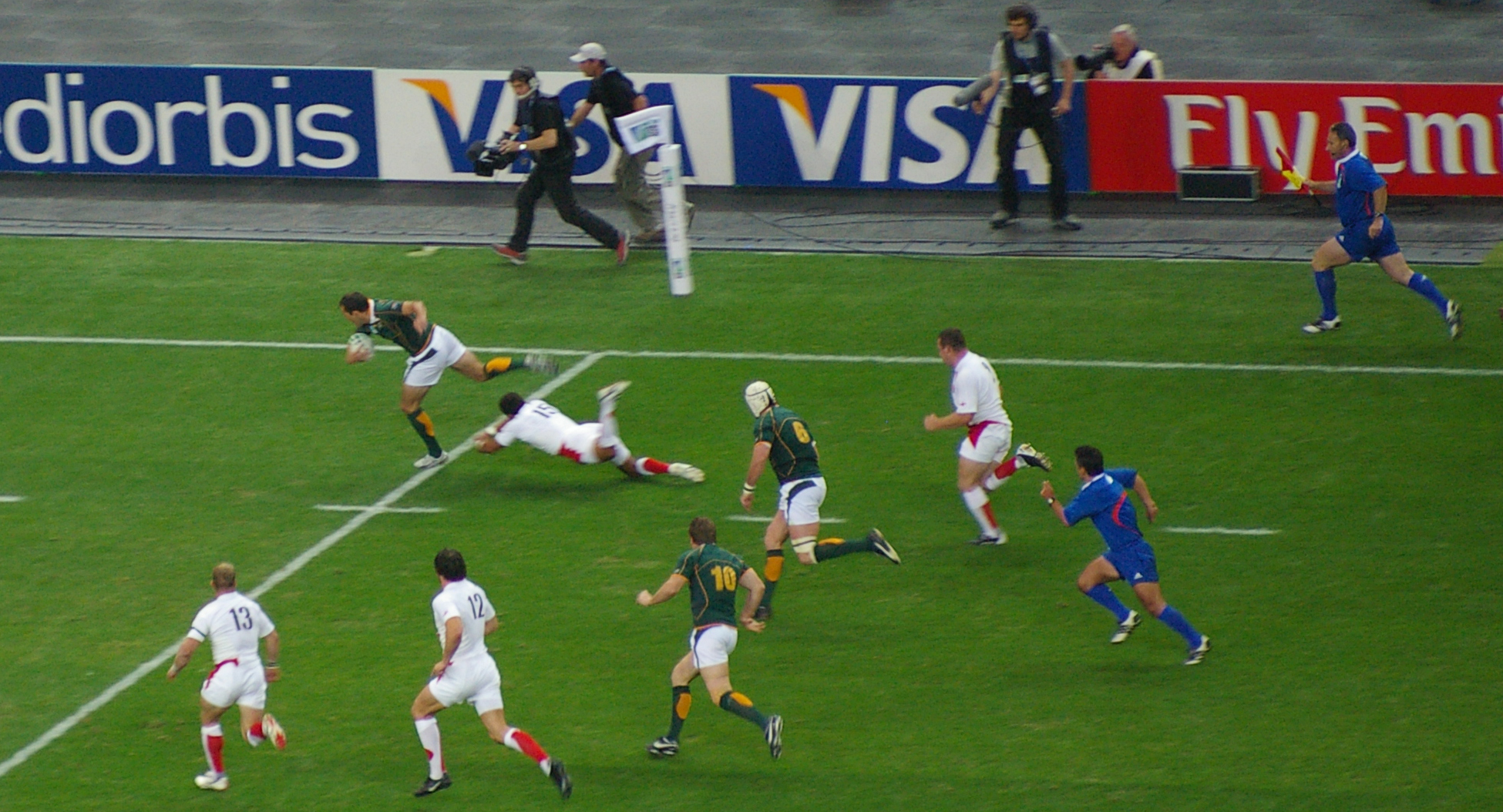
England playing against South Africa in the 2007 World Cup.

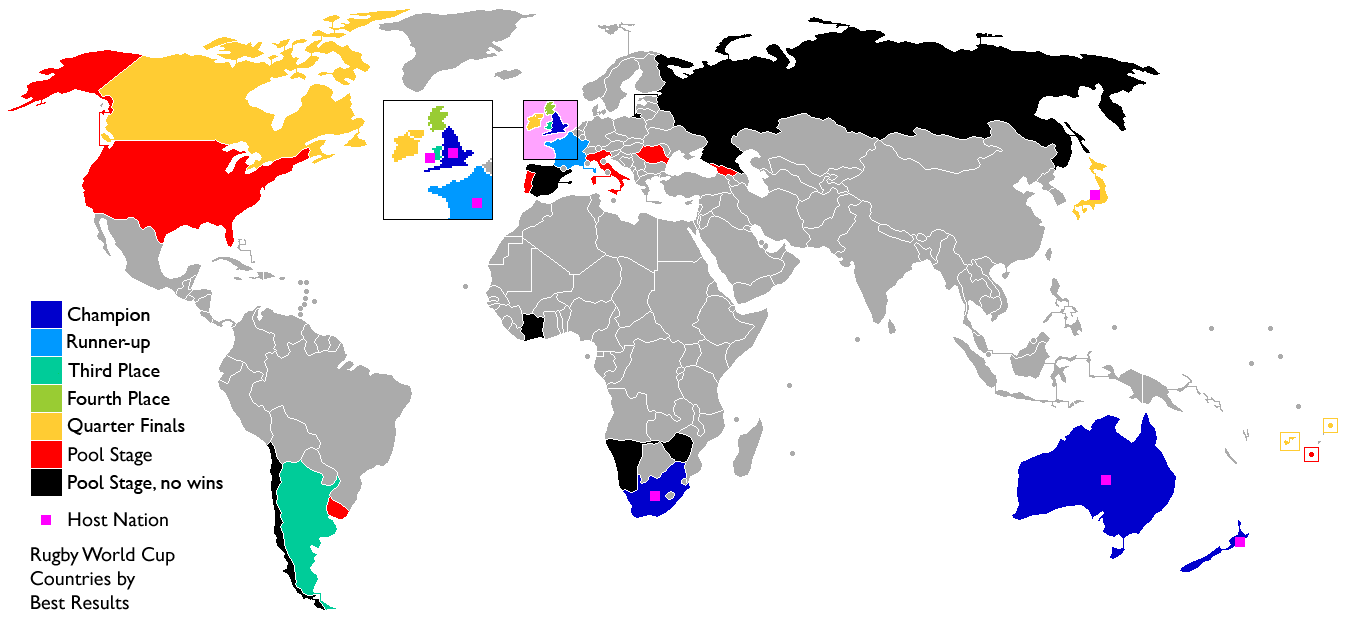
Map of the countries participating around the globe best results, excluding countries which unsuccessfully participated in qualifying tournaments.

The England national team have competed in every Rugby World Cup since the inaugural tournament in 1987. They have played 57 matches in ten tournaments, and won 42 for a winning record of 73.68%. Their best ever position was champions in 2003, whilst they have also participated in three other finals; the 2019 final, the 2007 final and the final of the 1991 competition. They have beaten one country five times, Argentina and three countries four times; Australia, United States and Samoa. Their worst record is against South Africa, who have defeated them in five of their six encounters.

England co-hosted the 1991 Rugby World Cup with Ireland, Scotland, Wales and France, with the final between England and Australia played at Twickenham. England was the sole host of the 2015 Rugby World Cup, although eight games were held at the Millennium Stadium, the Welsh national stadium in Cardiff.

== By position ==
Rugby World Cup record									Qualification						
Year	Round	Pld	W	D	L	PF	PA	Squad	Pos	Pld	W	D	L	PF	PA
(New Zealand) (Australia) 1987	Quarter-finals	4	2	0	2	103	48	Squad	Invited						
(England) (France) (Ireland) (Scotland) (Wales) 1991	Runners–up	6	4	0	2	119	61	Squad	Automatically qualified						
(South Africa) 1995	Fourth place	6	4	0	2	158	146	Squad	Automatically qualified						
(Wales) 1999	Quarter-finals	5	3	0	2	250	115	Squad	1st	2	2	0	0	133	15
(Australia) 2003	Champions	7	7	0	0	327	88	Squad	Automatically qualified						
(France) 2007	Runners–up	7	5	0	2	140	122	Squad	Automatically qualified						
(New Zealand) 2011	Quarter-finals	5	4	0	1	149	53	Squad	Automatically qualified						
(England) 2015	Pool stage	4	2	0	2	133	75	Squad	Automatically qualified						
(Japan) 2019	Runners–up	7	5	1	1	190	75	Squad	Automatically qualified						
(France) 2023	Third place	7	6	0	1	221	102	Squad	Automatically qualified						
(Australia) 2027	Qualified								Automatically qualified						
(United States) 2031	To be determined								To be determined						
Total	—	58	42	1	15	1790	885	—	—	2	2	0	0	133	15
Champions; Runners–up; Third place; Fourth place; Home venue

During Typhoon Hagibis; England v France was to be cancelled and recorded as 0–0 draw

== By tournament ==
=== 1987 New Zealand & Australia ===
Group matches

23 May 1987

Australia	19–6	England
Try: Campese; Poidevin; Con: Lynagh; Pen: Lynagh (3)	Report	Try: Harrison; Con: Webb

Concord Oval, Sydney
Attendance: 17,896
Referee: Keith Lawrence (New Zealand)

30 May 1987

England	60–7	Japan
Try: Harrison (3); Underwood (2); Salmon; Richards; Redman; Rees; Simms; Con: Webb (7); Pen: Webb (2)	Report	Try: Miyamoto; Pen: Matsuo

Concord Oval, Sydney
Attendance: 4,893
Referee: René Hourquet (France)

3 June 1987

England	34–6	United States
Try: Winterbottom (2); Harrison; Dooley; Con: Webb (3); Pen: Webb (4)	Report	Try: Purcell; Con: Nelson

Concord Oval, Sydney
Attendance: 8,785
Referee: Kerry Fitzgerald (Australia)

Team	Pld	W	D	L	PF	PA	PD	T	Pts	Qualification
Australia	3	3	0	0	108	41	+67	18	6	Knockout stage
England	3	2	0	1	100	32	+68	15	4	Knockout stage
United States	3	1	0	2	39	99	−60	5	2	
Japan	3	0	0	3	48	123	−75	7	0	

Quarter-final

8 June 1987

England	3–16	Wales
Pen: Webb		Try: Roberts; Jones; Devereux; Con: Thorburn (2)

Ballymore, Brisbane
Attendance: 15,000
Referee: René Hourquet (France)

=== 1991 UK, Ireland & France ===
Group matches

3 October 1991

England	12–18	New Zealand
Pen: Webb (3); Drop: Andrew		Try: Jones; Con: Fox; Pen: Fox (4)

Twickenham Stadium, London
Attendance: 57,000
Referee: Jim Fleming (Scotland)

8 October 1991

England	36–6	Italy
Try: Guscott (2); Underwood; Webb; Con: Webb (4); Pen: Webb (4)		Try: Cuttitta; Con: Dominguez

Twickenham Stadium, London
Attendance: 30,000
Referee: Brian Anderson (Scotland)

11 October 1991

England	37–9	United States
Try: Underwood (2); Carling; Skinner; Heslop; Con: Hodgkinson (4); Pen: Hodgkinson (3)		Try: Nelson; Con: Williams; Pen: Williams

Twickenham Stadium, London
Attendance: 45,000
Referee: Les Peard (Wales)

Team	Pld	W	D	L	PF	PA	PD	Pts
New Zealand	3	3	0	0	95	39	+56	6
England	3	2	0	1	85	33	+52	4
Italy	3	1	0	2	57	76	−19	2
United States	3	0	0	3	24	113	−89	0

Quarter-final

19 October 1991

France	10–19	England
Try: Lafond; Pen: Lacroix (2)	Report	Try: Underwood; Carling; Con: Webb; Pen: Webb (3)

Parc des Princes, Paris
Attendance: 48,500
Referee: Dave Bishop (New Zealand)

Semi-final

26 October 1991

Scotland	6–9	England
Pen: G. Hastings (2)	Report	Pen: Webb (2); Drop: Andrew

Murrayfield Stadium, Edinburgh
Attendance: 54,000
Referee: Kerry Fitzgerald (Australia)

Final

2 November 1991

Australia	12–6	England
Try: Daly; Con: Lynagh; Pen: Lynagh (2)	Report	Pen: Webb (2)

Twickenham Stadium, London
Attendance: 56,208
Referee: Derek Bevan (Wales)

=== 1995 South Africa ===
Group matches

27 May 1995

Argentina	18–24	England
Try: Arbizu; Noriega; Con: Arbizu; Pen: Arbizu (2)		Pen: Andrew (6); Drop: Andrew (2)

Kings Park Stadium, Durban
Attendance: 35,000
Referee: Jim Fleming (Scotland)

31 May 1995

England	27–20	Italy
Try: R. Underwood; T. Underwood; Con: Andrew; Pen: Andrew (5)		Try: Cuttitta; Vaccari; Con: Dominguez (2); Pen: Dominguez (2)

Kings Park Stadium, Durban
Attendance: 45,093
Referee: Stephen Hilditch (Ireland)

4 June 1995

England	44–22	Western Samoa
Try: R. Underwood (2); Back; Penalty try Con: Callard (3); Pen: Callard(5); Drop: Catt		Try: Sini (2); Umaga; Con: Fa'amasino (2); Pen: Fa'amasino

Kings Park Stadium, Durban
Attendance: 35,000
Referee: Patrick Robin (France)

Team	Pld	W	D	L	PF	PA	PD	Pts
England	3	3	0	0	95	60	+35	9
Western Samoa	3	2	0	1	96	88	+8	7
Italy	3	1	0	2	69	94	−25	5
Argentina	3	0	0	3	69	87	−18	3

Quarter-final

11 June 1995

England	25–22	Australia
Try: T. Underwood; Con: Andrew; Pen: Andrew (5); Drop: Andrew	Report	Try: Smith; Con: Lynagh; Pen: Lynagh (5)

Newlands Stadium, Cape Town
Attendance: 35,448
Referee: Dave Bishop (New Zealand)

Semi-final

18 June 1995

England	29–45	New Zealand
Try: Carling (2); R. Underwood (2); Con: Andrew (3); Pen: Andrew	Report	Try: Lomu (4); Kronfeld; Bachop; Con: Mehrtens (3); Pen: Mehrtens; Drop: Z. Brooke; Mehrtens

Newlands Stadium, Cape Town
Attendance: 43,414
Referee: Stephen Hilditch (Ireland)

Third-place play-off

22 June 1995

France	19–9	England
Try: Roumat; Ntamack; Pen: Lacroix (3)		Pen: Andrew (3)

Loftus Versfeld Stadium, Pretoria
Attendance: 44,000
Referee: Dave Bishop (New Zealand)

=== 1999 Wales ===
Group matches

2 October 1999
17:00 WEST/GMT+01 (UTC+01)

England	67–7	Italy
Try: Wilkinson; Hill; Luger; Back; De Glanville; Corry; Dawson; Perry; Con: Wilkinson (6); Pen: Wilkinson (5)		Try: Dominguez; Con: Dominguez

Twickenham Stadium, London
Attendance: 73,470
Referee: André Watson (South Africa)

9 October 1999
16:30 WEST/GMT+01 (UTC+01)

England	16–30	New Zealand
Try: De Glanville; Con: Wilkinson; Pen: Wilkinson (3)		Try: Kelleher; Wilson; Lomu; Con: Mehrtens (3); Pen: Mehrtens (3)

Twickenham Stadium, London
Attendance: 72,000
Referee: Peter Marshall (Australia)

15 October 1999
13:00 WEST/GMT+01 (UTC+01)

England	101–10	Tonga
Try: Guscott (2); Greening (2); Luger (2); Healey (2); Greenwood (2); Dawson; Perry; Hill; Con: Grayson (12); Pen: Grayson (4)		Try: Tiueti; Con: Tuipulotu; Pen: Tuipulotu

Twickenham Stadium, London
Attendance: 72,485
Referee: Wayne Erickson (Australia)

Team	Pld	W	D	L	PF	PA	PD	Pts
New Zealand	3	3	0	0	176	28	+148	9
England	3	2	0	1	184	47	+137	7
Tonga	3	1	0	2	47	171	−124	5
Italy	3	0	0	3	35	196	−161	3

Quarter-final play-offs

20 October 1999
13:00 WEST/GMT+1 (UTC+01)

England	45–24	Fiji
Try: Luger; Back; Beal; Greening; Con: Dawson; Wilkinson; Pen: Wilkinson (7)	Report	Try: Satala; Nakauta; Tiko; Con: Little (3); Pen: Serevi

Twickenham Stadium, London
Attendance: 55,000
Referee: Clayton Thomas (Wales)

Quarter-final

24 October 1999
14:00 CEST/GMT+2 (UTC+02)

South Africa	44–21	England
Try: Van der Westhuizen; P. Rossouw; Con: De Beer (2); Pen: De Beer (5); Drop: De Beer (5)	Report	Pen: Grayson (6); Wilkinson

Stade de France, Saint-Denis
Attendance: 75,000
Referee: Jim Fleming (Scotland)

=== 2003 Australia ===
Group matches

12 October 2003
20:00 AWST (UTC+8)

(1 BP) England	84–6	Georgia
Try: Tindall; Dawson; Thompson; Back; Dallaglio; Greenwood (2); Regan; Cohen (2); Robinson; Luger; Con: Wilkinson (5); Grayson (4); Pen: Wilkinson (2)		Pen: Urjukashvili; Jimsheladze

Subiaco Oval, Perth
Attendance: 25,501
Referee: Pablo De Luca (Argentina)

18 October 2003
20:00 AWST (UTC+8)

South Africa	6–25	England
Pen: Koen (2)		Try: Greenwood; Con: Wilkinson; Pen: Wilkinson (4); Drop: Wilkinson (2)

Subiaco Oval, Perth
Attendance: 38,834
Referee: Peter Marshall (Australia)

26 October 2003
20:00 AEST (UTC+11)

(1 BP) England	35–22	Samoa
Try: Back; Penalty try Balshaw; Vickery; Con: Wilkinson (3); Pen: Wilkinson (2); Drop: Wilkinson		Try: Sititi; Con: Va'a; Pen: Va'a (5)

Docklands Stadium, Melbourne
Attendance: 50,647
Referee: Jonathan Kaplan (South Africa)

2 November 2003
17:30 AEST (UTC+11)

(1 BP) England	111–13	Uruguay
Try: Moody; Lewsey (5); Balshaw (2); Catt (2); Gomarsall (2); Luger; Abbott; Robinson (2); Greenwood; Con: Grayson (11); Catt (2)		Try: Lemoine; Con: Menchaca; Pen: Menchaca (2)

Lang Park, Brisbane
Attendance: 46,233
Referee: Nigel Whitehouse (Wales)

Team	Pld	W	D	L	PF	PA	PD	BP	Pts	Qualification
England	4	4	0	0	255	47	+208	3	19	Quarter-finals
South Africa	4	3	0	1	184	60	+124	3	15	Quarter-finals
Samoa	4	2	0	2	138	117	+21	2	10	
Uruguay	4	1	0	3	56	255	−199	0	4	
Georgia	4	0	0	4	46	200	−154	0	0	

Quarter-final

9 November 2003
20:00 AEST (UTC+11)

England	28–17	Wales
Try: Greenwood 44' c Con: Wilkinson (1/1) 44'; Pen: Wilkinson (6); Drop: Wilkinson 80+1'		Try: S. Jones 30' m Charvis 35' m M. Williams 71' c Con: Harris (1/3) 72'

Lang Park, Brisbane
Attendance: 45,252
Referee: Alain Rolland (Ireland)

Semi-final

16 November 2003
20:00 AEST (UTC+11)

France	7–24	England
Try: Betsen 10' c Con: Michalak (1/1) 11'		Pen: Wilkinson (5); Drop: Wilkinson (3) 9', 38', 58'

Stadium Australia, Sydney
Attendance: 82,346
Referee: Paddy O'Brien (New Zealand)

Final

22 November 2003
20:00 AEST (UTC+11)

Australia	17–20 (a.e.t.)	England
Try: Tuqiri 6' m Pen: Flatley (4)	Report	Try: Robinson 38' m Pen: Wilkinson (4); Drop: Wilkinson 100'

Stadium Australia, Sydney
Attendance: 82,957
Referee: André Watson (South Africa)

=== 2007 France ===
Group matches

8 September 2007
18:00 CEST (UTC+2)

England	28–10	United States
Try: Robinson 35' m Barkley 40+1' c Rees 49' c Con: Barkley (2/3) 40+2', 50'; Pen: Barkley (3/3) 7', 22', 31'	Report	Try: Moeakiola 74' c Con: Hercus (1/1) 74'; Pen: Hercus (1/1) 9'

Stade Félix Bollaert, Lens
Attendance: 36,755
Referee: Jonathan Kaplan (South Africa)

14 September 2007
21:00 CEST (UTC+2)

England	0–36	South Africa
	Report	Try: Smith 6' c Pietersen (2) 38' c, 64' c Con: Montgomery (3/3) 7', 39', 64'; Pen: Steyn (1/1) 11'; Montgomery (4/4) 36', 46', 55', 79'

Stade de France, Saint-Denis
Attendance: 77,523
Referee: Joël Jutge (France)

22 September 2007
16:00 CEST (UTC+2)

(1 BP) England	44–22	Samoa
Try: Corry (2) 2' c, 76' c Sackey (2) 32' c, 80+1' m Con: Wilkinson (3/4) 3', 32', 76'; Pen: Wilkinson (4/6) 15', 22', 33', 72'; Drop: Wilkinson (2/3) 6', 69'	Report	Try: Polu 47' c Con: Crichton (1/1) 47'; Pen: Crichton (5/5) 9', 12', 38', 40+1', 42'

Stade de la Beaujoire, Nantes
Attendance: 37,022
Referee: Alan Lewis (Ireland)

28 September 2007
21:00 CEST (UTC+2)

(1 BP) England	36–20	Tonga
Try: Sackey (2) 20' m, 38' m Tait 57' c Farrell 66' c Con: Wilkinson (2/4) 58', 66'; Pen: Wilkinson (2/3) 14', 36'; Drop: Wilkinson (2/2) 32', 72'	Report	Try: Hufanga 17' c T-Pole 80' c Con: Hola (2/2) 18', 80'; Pen: Hola (2/2) 11', 55'

Parc des Princes, Paris
Attendance: 45,085
Referee: Alain Rolland (Ireland)

Pos	Team	Pld	W	D	L	PF	PA	PD	B	Pts	Qualification
1	South Africa	4	4	0	0	189	47	+142	3	19	Advanced to the quarter-finals and qualified for the 2011 Rugby World Cup
2	England	4	3	0	1	108	88	+20	2	14	Advanced to the quarter-finals and qualified for the 2011 Rugby World Cup
3	Tonga	4	2	0	2	89	96	−7	1	9	Eliminated, automatic qualification for 2011 Rugby World Cup
4	Samoa	4	1	0	3	69	143	−74	1	5	
5	United States	4	0	0	4	61	142	−81	1	1	

Quarter-final

6 October 2007
15:00 CEST (UTC+2)

Australia	10–12	England
Try: Tuqiri 33' c Con: Mortlock (1/1) 34'; Pen: Mortlock (1/4) 6'	Report	Pen: Wilkinson (4/7) 22', 25', 51', 59'

Stade Vélodrome, Marseille
Attendance: 59,102
Referee: Alain Rolland (Ireland)

Semi-final

13 October 2007
21:00 CEST (UTC+2)

England	14–9	France
Try: Lewsey 2' m Pen: Wilkinson (2/3) 47', 75'; Drop: Wilkinson (1/4) 78'	Report	Pen: Beauxis (3/3) 8', 18', 44'

Stade de France, Saint-Denis
Attendance: 80,283
Referee: Jonathan Kaplan (South Africa)

Final

20 October 2007
21:00 CEST (UTC+2)

England	6–15	South Africa
Pen: Wilkinson (2/2) 13', 44'	Report	Pen: Montgomery (4/4) 7', 16', 40', 51'; Steyn (1/2) 62'

Stade de France, Saint-Denis
Attendance: 80,430
Referee: Alain Rolland (Ireland)

=== 2011 New Zealand ===
Group matches

10 September 2011
20:30 NZDT (UTC+13)

(1 BP) Argentina	9–13	England
Pen: Contepomi (1/2) 7'; Rodríguez (2/7) 20', 45'	Report	Try: Youngs 67' c Con: Wilkinson (1/1) 68'; Pen: Wilkinson (2/7) 12', 75'

Otago Stadium, Dunedin
Attendance: 30,700
Referee: Bryce Lawrence (New Zealand)

18 September 2011
18:00 NZDT (UTC+13)

(1 BP) England	41–10	Georgia
Try: Hape (2) 4' c, 21' c Armitage 47' m Tuilagi 62' c Ashton (2) 65' c, 80' m Con: Flood (4/6) 5', 21', 63', 66'; Pen: Flood (1/1) 35'	Report	Try: Basilaia 40' c Con: Kvirikashvili (1/1) 40'; Pen: Kvirikashvili (1/6) 27'

Otago Stadium, Dunedin
Attendance: 20,117
Referee: Jonathan Kaplan (South Africa)

24 September 2011
18:00 NZDT (UTC+13)

(1 BP) England	67–3	Romania
Try: Cueto (3) 15' m, 22' c, 26' m Ashton (3) 32' c, 35' c, 70' c Youngs 41' m Foden 49' c Tuilagi 61' c Croft 67' c Con: Wilkinson (3/5) 22', 32', 36'; Flood (4/5) 49', 61', 67', 70'; Pen: Wilkinson (1/1) 2'	Report	Pen: Dumbravă (1/5) 38'

Otago Stadium, Dunedin
Attendance: 25,687
Referee: Romain Poite (France)

1 October 2011
20:30 NZDT (UTC+13)

England	16–12	Scotland (1 BP)
Try: Ashton 78' c Con: Flood (1/1) 79'; Pen: Wilkinson (2/5) 34', 63'; Drop: Wilkinson (1/2) 57'	Report	Pen: Paterson (2/2) 9', 55'; Parks (1/1) 17'; Drop: Parks (1/3) 40'

Eden Park, Auckland
Attendance: 58,213
Referee: Craig Joubert (South Africa)

Pos	Team	Pld	W	D	L	PF	PA	PD	T	B	Pts	Qualification
1	England	4	4	0	0	137	34	+103	18	2	18	Advanced to the quarter-finals and qualified for the 2015 Rugby World Cup
2	Argentina	4	3	0	1	90	40	+50	10	2	14	Advanced to the quarter-finals and qualified for the 2015 Rugby World Cup
3	Scotland	4	2	0	2	73	59	+14	4	3	11	Eliminated but qualified for 2015 Rugby World Cup
4	Georgia	4	1	0	3	48	90	−42	3	0	4	
5	Romania	4	0	0	4	44	169	−125	3	0	0	

Quarter-final

8 October 2011
20:30 NZDT (UTC+13)

England	12–19	France
Try: Foden 55' c Cueto 77' m Con: Wilkinson (1/2) 55'	Report	Try: Clerc 22' m Médard 31' m Pen: Yachvili (2/3) 11', 16'; Drop: Trinh-Duc (1/1) 73'

Eden Park, Auckland
Attendance: 49,105
Referee: Steve Walsh (Australia)

=== 2015 England ===
Group matches

18 September 2015
20:00 BST (UTC+01)

(1 BP) England	35–11	Fiji
Try: Penalty try 13' c Brown (2) 22' m, 72' c B. Vunipola 80' c Con: Ford (1/2) 13'; Farrell (2/2) 73', 80'; Pen: Ford (2/3) 3', 34'; Farrell (1/1) 68'	Report	Try: Nadolo 30' m Pen: Nadolo (1/3) 37'; Volavola (1/2) 64'

Twickenham Stadium, London
Attendance: 80,015
Referee: Jaco Peyper (South Africa)

26 September 2015
20:00 BST (UTC+01)

(1 BP) England	25–28	Wales
Try: May 27' c Con: Farrell (1/1) 29'; Pen: Farrell (5/5) 12', 24', 44', 52', 69'; Drop: Farrell (1/1) 18'	Report	Try: G. Davies 71' c Con: Biggar (1/1) 72'; Pen: Biggar (7/7) 3', 16', 40', 48', 54', 59', 75'

Twickenham Stadium, London
Attendance: 81,129
Referee: Jérôme Garcès (France)

3 October 2015
20:00 BST (UTC+01)

England	13–33	Australia
Try: Watson 56' c Con: Farrell (1/1) 57'; Pen: Farrell (2/2) 13', 65'	Report	Try: Foley (2) 20' c, 35' c Giteau 80' c Con: Foley (3/3) 22', 36', 80'; Pen: Foley (4/4) 8', 50', 72', 76'

Twickenham Stadium, London
Attendance: 81,010
Referee: Romain Poite (France)

10 October 2015
20:00 BST (UTC+01)

(1 BP) England	60–3	Uruguay
Try: Watson (2) 7' c, 42' m Easter (3) 18' c, 23' c, 60' m Slade 54' m Nowell (3) 57' c, 70' m, 74' m Penalty try 80' c Con: Farrell (4/6) 8', 19', 25', 58'; Ford (1/4) 80'	Report	Pen: Berchesi (1/1) 2'

City of Manchester Stadium, Manchester
Attendance: 50,778
Referee: Chris Pollock (New Zealand)

Pos	Team	Pld	W	D	L	PF	PA	PD	T	B	Pts	Qualification
1	Australia	4	4	0	0	141	35	+106	17	1	17	Advanced to the quarter-finals and qualified for the 2019 Rugby World Cup
2	Wales	4	3	0	1	111	62	+49	11	1	13	Advanced to the quarter-finals and qualified for the 2019 Rugby World Cup
3	England	4	2	0	2	133	75	+58	16	3	11	Eliminated but qualified for 2019 Rugby World Cup
4	Fiji	4	1	0	3	84	101	−17	10	1	5	
5	Uruguay	4	0	0	4	30	226	−196	2	0	0	

=== 2019 Japan ===
Group matches

22 September 2019
19:15 JST (UTC+09)

(1 BP) England	35–3	Tonga
Try: Tuilagi (2) 24' m, 31' c George 57' c Cowan-Dickie 77' c Con: Farrell (3/4) 33', 58', 78'; Pen: Farrell (3/3) 11', 37', 43'	Report	Pen: Takulua (1/2) 15'

Sapporo Dome, Sapporo
Attendance: 35,923
Referee: Paul Williams (New Zealand)

26 September 2019
19:45 JST (UTC+09)

(1 BP) England	45–7	United States
Try: Ford 5' c Vunipola 24' c Cowan-Dickie 32' m Cokanasiga (2) 47' m, 75' c McConnochie 57' c Ludlam 66' c Con: Ford (5/7) 7', 25', 59', 68', 76'	Report	Try: Campbell 80+1' c Con: MacGinty (1/1) 80+2'

Kobe Misaki Stadium, Kobe
Attendance: 27,194
Referee: Nic Berry (Australia)

5 October 2019
17:00 JST (UTC+09)

(1 BP) England	39–10	Argentina
Try: May 9' m Daly 35' m Youngs 40+1' m Ford 45' c Nowell 74' c Cowan-Dickie 80' c Con: Farrell (3/6) 47', 76', 80+1'; Pen: Farrell (1/1) 54'	Report	Try: Moroni 71' c Con: Boffelli (1/1) 72'; Pen: Urdapilleta (1/1) 7'

Tokyo Stadium, Chōfu
Attendance: 48,185
Referee: Nigel Owens (Wales)

12 October 2019
17:15 JST (UTC+09)

England	0–0 (Cancelled)	France

International Stadium Yokohama, Yokohama
Referee: Jaco Peyper (South Africa)

Notes:

- As a result of inclement weather caused by Typhoon Hagibis this match was cancelled and awarded as a 0–0 draw.

Pos	Team	Pld	W	D	L	PF	PA	PD	T	B	Pts	Qualification
1	England	4	3	1	0	119	20	+99	17	3	17	Advanced to the quarter-finals and qualified for the 2023 Rugby World Cup
2	France	4	3	1	0	79	51	+28	9	1	15	Advanced to the quarter-finals and qualified for the 2023 Rugby World Cup
3	Argentina	4	2	0	2	106	91	+15	14	3	11	Eliminated but qualified for 2023 Rugby World Cup
4	Tonga	4	1	0	3	67	105	−38	9	2	6	
5	United States	4	0	0	4	52	156	−104	7	0	0	

Quarter-final

19 October 2019
16:15 JST (UTC+09)

England	40–16	Australia
Try: May (2) 18' c, 21' c Sinckler 46' c Watson 76' c Con: Farrell (4/4) 19', 23', 47', 77'; Pen: Farrell (4/4) 30', 51', 66', 73'	Report	Try: Koroibete 43' c Con: Lealiifano (1/1) 44'; Pen: Lealiifano (3/3) 12', 26', 41'

Ōita Stadium, Ōita
Attendance: 36,954
Referee: Jérôme Garcès (France)

Semi-final

26 October 2019
17:00 JST (UTC+09)

England	19–7	New Zealand
Try: Tuilagi 2' c Con: Farrell (1/1) 3'; Pen: Ford (4/5) 40', 50', 63', 69'	Report	Try: Savea 57' c Con: Mo'unga (1/1) 58'

International Stadium Yokohama, Yokohama
Attendance: 68,843
Referee: Nigel Owens (Wales)

Final

2 November 2019
18:00 JST (UTC+09)

England	12–32	South Africa
Pen: Farrell (4/5) 23', 35', 52', 60'	Report	Try: Mapimpi 66' c Kolbe 74' c Con: Pollard (2/2) 67', 75'; Pen: Pollard (6/8) 10', 26', 39', 43', 46', 58'

International Stadium Yokohama, Yokohama
Attendance: 70,103
Referee: Jérôme Garcès (France)

=== 2023 France ===
Group matches

9 September 2023
21:00 CEST (UTC+2)

England	27–10	Argentina
Pen: Ford (6/6) 10', 46', 54', 59', 66', 75'; Drop: Ford (3/3) 27', 31', 37'	Report	Try: Bruni 79' c Con: Boffelli (1/1) 80'; Pen: Boffelli (1/2) 5'

Stade Vélodrome, Marseille
Attendance: 63,118
Referee: Mathieu Raynal (France)

17 September 2023
21:00 CEST (UTC+2)

(1 BP) England	34–12	Japan
Try: Ludlam 24' c Lawes 56' c Steward 66' c Marchant 80+1' c Con: Ford (4/4) 26', 56', 67', 80+1'; Pen: Ford (2/3) 4', 42'	Report	Pen: Matsuda (4/4) 15', 23', 32', 54'

Allianz Riviera, Nice
Attendance: 30,500
Referee: Nika Amashukeli (Georgia)

23 September 2023
17:45 CEST (UTC+2)

(1 BP) England	71–0	Chile
Try: Arundell (5) 20' m, 30' m, 48' c, 60' c, 69' m Dan (2) 24' c, 45' c Rodd 35' c Smith (2) 40' c, 77' c Willis 80' c Con: Farrell (8/11) 25', 36', 40+2', 46', 49', 62', 78', 80+1'	Report

Stade Pierre-Mauroy, Lille
Attendance: 44,315
Referee: Jaco Peyper (South Africa)

7 October 2023
17:45 CEST (UTC+2)

England	18–17	Samoa (1 BP)
Try: Chessum 9' m Care 73' c Con: Farrell (1/2) 74'; Pen: Farrell (2/3) 18', 58'	Report	Try: Ah Wong (2) 22' c, 29' c Con: Sopoaga (2/2) 24', 30'; Pen: Sopoaga (1/2) 48'

Stade Pierre-Mauroy, Lille
Attendance: 47,891
Referee: Andrew Brace (Ireland)

Pos	Team	Pld	W	D	L	PF	PA	PD	TF	TA	B	Pts	Qualification
1	England	4	4	0	0	150	39	+111	17	3	2	18	Advance to knockout stage, and qualification to the 2027 Men's Rugby World Cup
2	Argentina	4	3	0	1	127	69	+58	15	5	2	14	Advance to knockout stage, and qualification to the 2027 Men's Rugby World Cup
3	Japan	4	2	0	2	109	107	+2	12	14	1	9	Qualification to the 2027 Men's Rugby World Cup
4	Samoa	4	1	0	3	92	75	+17	11	7	3	7	
5	Chile	4	0	0	4	27	215	−188	4	30	0	0	

Source: World Rugby
Rules for classification: Pool stage tiebreakers

Quarter-final

15 October 2023
17:00 CEST (UTC+2)

England	30–24	Fiji
Try: Tuilagi 14' m Marchant 23' c Con: Farrell (1/2) 23'; Pen: Farrell (5/6) 11', 34', 38', 54', 78'; Drop: Farrell (1/1) 72'	Report	Try: Mata 28' c Ravai 64' c Botitu 68' c Con: Lomani (1/1) 29'; Kuruvoli (2/2) 65', 70'; Pen: Lomani (1/3) 20'

Stade Vélodrome, Marseille
Attendance: 61,863
Referee: Mathieu Raynal (France)

Semi-final

21 October 2023
21:00 CEST (UTC+2)

England	15–16	South Africa
Pen: Farrell (4/4) 3', 10', 24', 39'; Drop: Farrell (1/1) 53'	Report	Try: Snyman 69' c Con: Pollard (1/1) 70'; Pen: Libbok (1/1) 21'; Pollard (2/2) 35', 78'

Stade de France, Saint-Denis
Attendance: 78,098
Referee: Ben O'Keeffe (New Zealand)

Third-place play-off

27 October 2023
21:00 CEST (UTC+2)

Argentina	23–26	England
Try: Cubelli 36' c S. Carreras 42' c Con: Boffelli (2/2) 37', 43'; Pen: Boffelli (2/2) 24', 50'; Sánchez (1/2) 68'	Report	Try: Earl 8' c Dan 44' c Con: Farrell (2/2) 9', 45'; Pen: Farrell (4/4) 3', 13', 30', 65'

Stade de France, Saint-Denis
Attendance: 77,604
Referee: Nic Berry (Australia)

=== 2027 Australia ===
Group matches

2 October 2027
20:15 AEST (UTC+10)

England	v	Tonga

Lang Park, Brisbane

8 October 2027
20:15 ACDT (UTC+10:30)

England	v	Zimbabwe

Adelaide Oval, Adelaide

16 October 2027
19:45 AEDT (UTC+11)

England	v	Wales

Stadium Australia, Sydney

Pos	Team	Pld	W	D	L	PF	PA	PD	TF	TA	TB	LB	Pts	Qualification
1	England	0	0	0	0	0	0	0	0	0	0	0	0	Advance to knockout stage
2	Wales	0	0	0	0	0	0	0	0	0	0	0	0	Advance to knockout stage
3	Tonga	0	0	0	0	0	0	0	0	0	0	0	0	Possible knockout stage based on ranking
4	Zimbabwe	0	0	0	0	0	0	0	0	0	0	0	0	

First match(es) will be played: 2 October 2027. Source: World Rugby
Rules for classification: Pool stage tiebreakers

== Overall record ==
Against	Played	Won	Drawn	Lost	For	Against	% Won
Argentina	5	5	0	0	129	70	100
Australia	7	4	0	3	122	129	57.14
Chile	1	1	0	0	71	0	100
Fiji	3	3	0	0	110	59	100
France	6	3	1	2	78	64	50
Georgia	2	2	0	0	125	16	100
Italy	3	3	0	0	130	33	100
Japan	2	2	0	0	94	19	100
New Zealand	4	1	0	3	76	100	25
Romania	1	1	0	0	67	3	100
Samoa	4	4	0	0	141	83	100
Scotland	2	2	0	0	25	18	100
South Africa	6	1	0	5	79	149	16.67
Tonga	3	3	0	0	172	33	100
United States	4	4	0	0	144	32	100
Uruguay	2	2	0	0	171	16	100
Wales	3	1	0	2	56	61	33.33
Total	58	42	1	15	1790	885	72.41

== See also ==
• England women at the Rugby World Cup
