= Ashleigh Hewson =

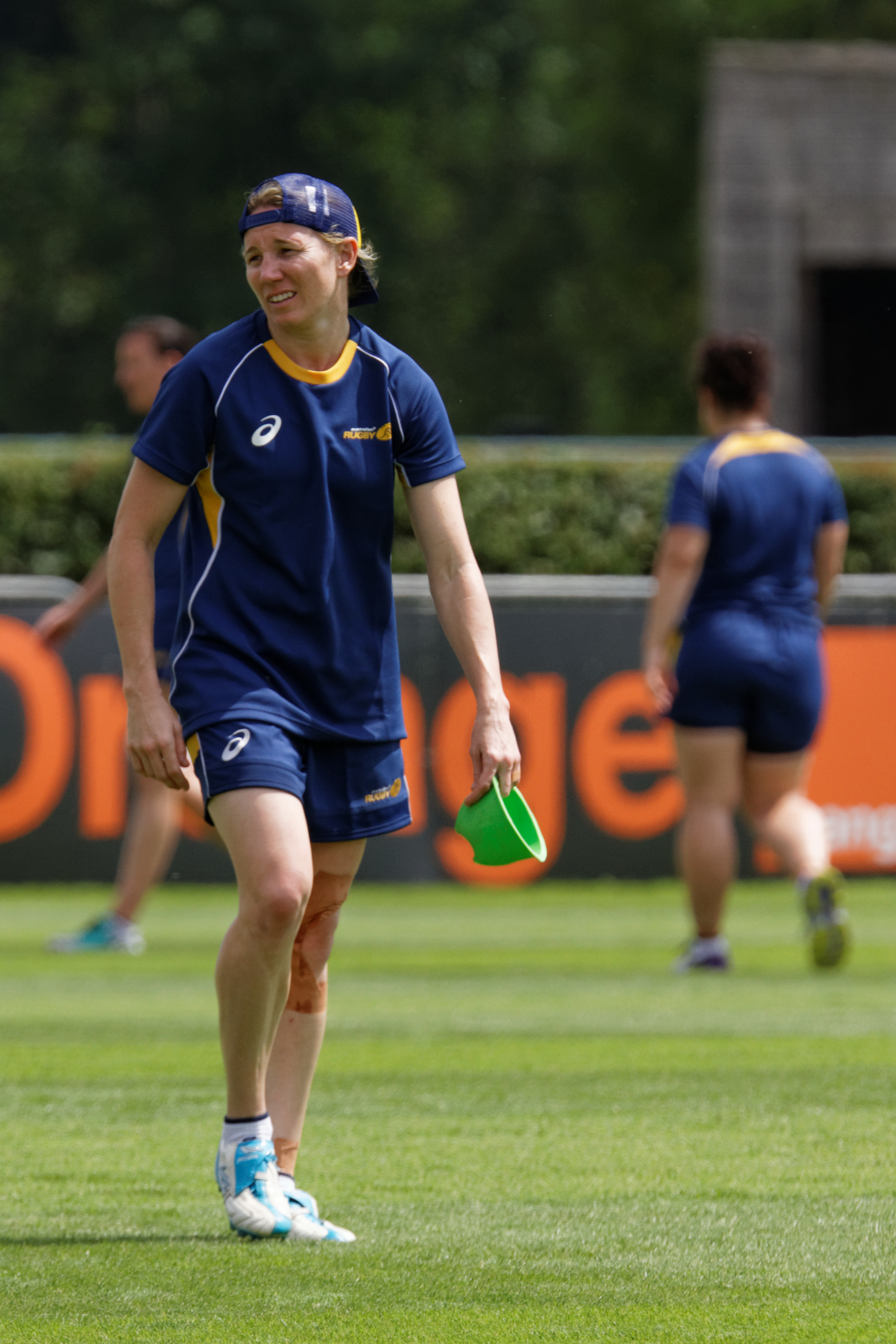
- Born: 18 December 1979 (age 46)
- Height: 165 cm (5 ft 5 in)
- Weight: 64 kg (141 lb)

Rugby union career
- Position(s): Fullback, Flyhalf
Super Rugby
Years	Team	Apps	(Points)
2018–	NSW Waratahs		(0)
2022–	ACT Brumbies		(0)
International career
Years	Team	Apps	(Points)
2009–2017	Australia	18	(0)

Ashleigh Hewson (born 18 December 1979) is a former Australian rugby union player and captain of the Australian national women's team, the Wallaroos. She was a member of the Wallaroos squad at three Rugby World Cups — 2010, 2014 and 2017.

== Early career ==
Before representing Australia in rugby, Hewson had been named in the Australia women's national soccer team, she also excelled in touch, athletics and cricket internationally.

== Rugby career ==
=== International ===
Hewson made her international debut for Australia against Samoa in 2009. The Wallaroos scored 87 unanswered points over Samoa in their Oceania qualifier in Apia for the 2010 World Cup.

She was a member of the Wallaroos squad at the 2010 Rugby World Cup that finished in their highest placing of third.

She scored a try for the Wallaroos in their opening match of the 2014 Rugby World Cup against South Africa. She was the 5th highest points scorer of the tournament with 39 points, her side finished in 7th place.

She captained the Wallaroos for the first time in their three match tour of New Zealand in 2016. Despite a record 67–3 loss to the Black Ferns in the first game of the Laurie O'Reilly Cup, she was a stand out for her side in the second test.

In October 2016, She was named as Australia's women's XVs player of the year, taking out the prestigious John Eales medal.

Hewson captained the Wallaroos side in their tests against Canada, England and New Zealand in June 2017. She later led the Wallaroos at the 2017 Rugby World Cup in Ireland.

=== Super W ===
In 2018, She kicked an extra-time goal to help the NSW Waratahs win the inaugural Super W Grand Final against the Queensland Reds.

She returned for another season in 2019 and led the team unbeaten, into a second consecutive home Grand Final against Queensland at Leichhardt Oval. They narrowly defeated Queensland 8–5 to win their second Super W title.

== Personal life ==
Hewson was a prison guard in Sydney for 10 years and worked as a Services and Program officer with offenders who have an intellectual disability.
