= Kayla Sauvao =

Australian rugby league footballer (born 1998)

Personal information
- Born: 12 May 1998 (age 27); Ōtāhuhu, New Zealand
- Height: 174 cm (5 ft 9 in)
- Weight: 96 kg (15 st 2 lb)

Playing information

Rugby union
- Position: Centre
Representative
Years	Team	Pld	T	G	FG	P
2017–19	Australia

Rugby league
- Position: Prop
Club
Years	Team	Pld	T	G	FG	P
2020–	New Zealand Warriors	2	0	0	0	0
- Source: RLP As of 19 February 2021

Kayla Sauvao (born 12 May 1998) is an Australian rugby league footballer who plays as a prop for the New Zealand Warriors in the NRL Women's Premiership and Wentworthville Magpies in the NSWRL Women's Premiership.

Before switching to rugby league, she represented Australia in rugby union.

== Background ==
Sauvao was born in Ōtāhuhu, Auckland, before moving to Australia, where she played rugby union for the Parramatta Two Blues.

== Playing career ==
=== Rugby union ===
In 2017, Sauvao represented Australia at the 2017 Women's Rugby World Cup in Ireland.

=== Rugby league ===
In 2020, Sauvao switched to rugby league, joining the Wentworthville Magpies in the NSWRL Women's Premiership.

In September 2020, she joined the New Zealand Warriors NRL Women's Premiership team. In Round 1 of the 2020 NRLW season, she made her debut for the Warriors, starting at prop in their 28–14 loss to the Brisbane Broncos.
