= René Hourquet =

French rugby union referee and administrator (1941–2024)

Treasurer of the French Rugby Federation
- In office 2000–2012

Personal details
- Born: 15 November 1941 Castres, France
- Died: 27 August 2024 (aged 82)
- Occupation: Rugby union referee Administrator

René Hourquet (15 November 1941 – 27 August 2024) was a French rugby union referee and administrator.

== Biography ==
Born in Castres on 15 November 1941, Hourquet officiated his first international rugby union match on 21 December 1980 between Spain and Italy. He refereed two matches at the 1987 Rugby World Cup, two matches at the 1991 Rugby World Cup, and five Five Nations Championship matches between 1980 and 1991. He officiated his final match on 14 October 1991, a World Cup match between Japan and Zimbabwe. In the final of the 1987–88 French Rugby Union Championship, he replaced another referee in the 54th minute after an injury.

Hourquet served as treasurer of the French Rugby Federation from 2001 to 2012 and was president of the Commission centrale des arbitres de rugby à XV from 1992 to 2009.

Hourquet died on 27 August 2024, at the age of 82.
