= Cheyenne Campbell =

- Born: 10 September 1986 (age 40) Hamilton, New Zealand
- Height: 1.64 m (5 ft 4 1/2 in)
- Weight: 74 kg (163 lb; 11 st 9 lb)

Rugby union career
- Position: Centre
Senior career
Years	Team	Apps	(Points)
2018	Reds		
International career
Years	Team	Apps	(Points)
- Australia
National sevens team
Years	Team		Comps
- Australia

Cheyenne Campbell (born 10 September 1986) is a female rugby union player for Australia. She was a member of the squad to the 2010 Women's Rugby World Cup that finished in third place.

She has been named in Australia's 2014 Women's Rugby World Cup squad.

Campbell is a cousin of Wallabies flyhalf Quade Cooper. She currently works as a PE teacher at Shailer Park State High.
