= Victoria Subritzky-Nafatali =

NZ international rugby union player

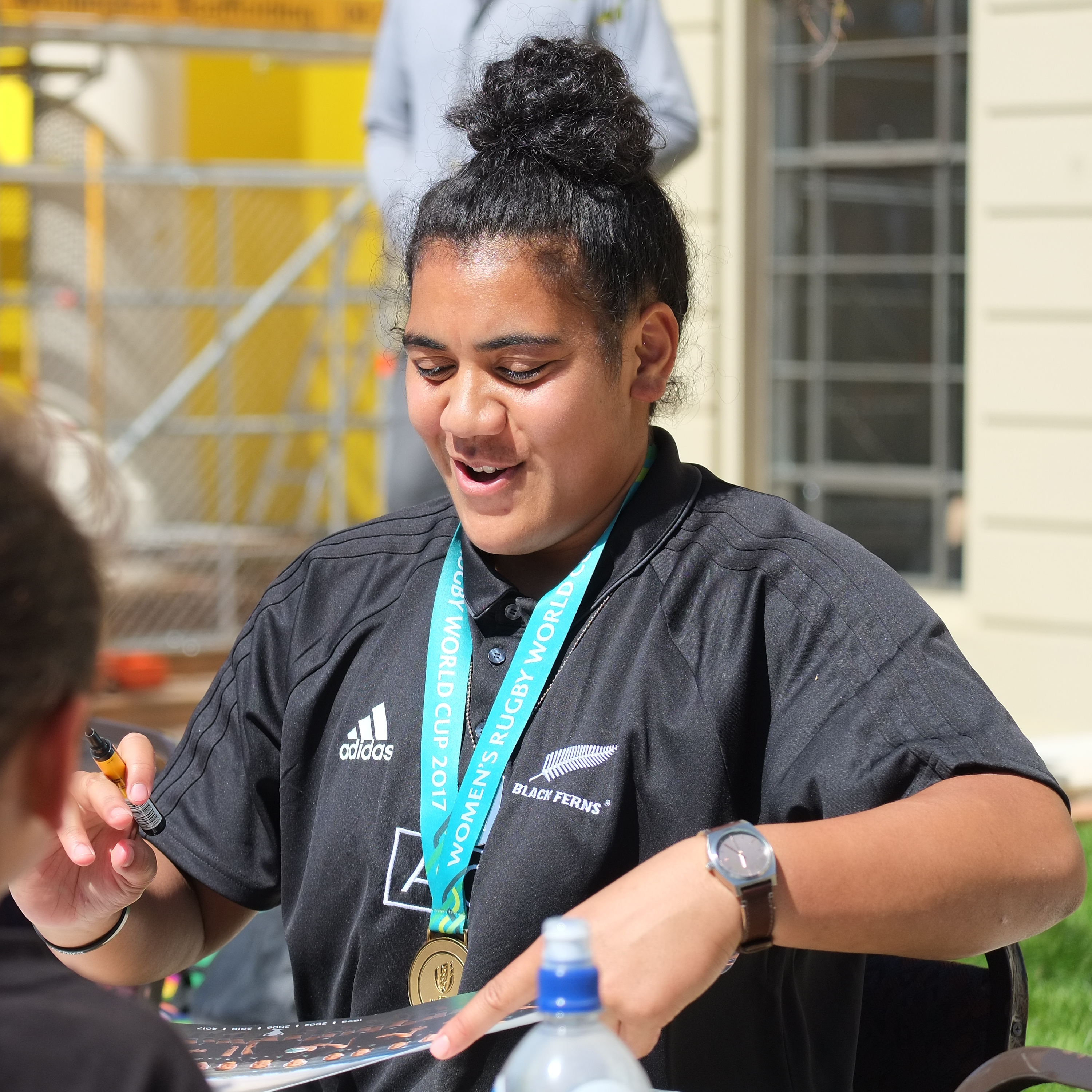
- Subritzky-Nafatali signing autograph in 2017
- Born: 2 December 1991 (age 34) Timaru, New Zealand
- Height: 1.72 m (5 ft 8 in)
- Weight: 99 kg (218 lb)

Rugby union career
- Position: Fly half
Provincial / State sides
Years	Team	Apps	(Points)
2007–2014, 2022–	Otago Spirit	8	(51)
2015–2017	Counties Manukau	22	(67)
2019–2021	Northland	16	(45)
Super Rugby
Years	Team	Apps	(Points)
2023	Hurricanes Poua	5	(0)
International career
Years	Team	Apps	(Points)
2012–2017	New Zealand	19	(34)
Medal record
Women's rugby union
Representing New Zealand
Women's Rugby World Cup
Gold medal – first place	2017 Ireland	Team competition

Victoria Subritzky-Nafatali (born 2 December 1991) is a New Zealand rugby union player. She was part of the Black Ferns squad that won the 2017 Rugby World Cup in Ireland. She also plays for Hurricanes Poua in the Super Rugby Aupiki competition and represents Otago provincially.

== Rugby career ==
=== 2007–15 ===
Subritzky-Nafatali debuted for Otago in 2007 when she was only 15. She made her Black Ferns test debut against England in 2012. In 2015, she started in the opening test against Canada for the Super Series. She helped the Black Ferns claim the inaugural Super Series title as they dominated the United States 47–14 in the final round.

=== 2016 ===
Subritzky-Nafatali helped Counties Manukau win the Farah Palmer Cup in 2016. She was named in the Black Ferns squad for the Laurie O'Reilly Cup and scored a try in the first test against the Wallaroos. She was replaced by Kelly Brazier for the second test.

=== 2017–19 ===
Subritzky-Nafatali was selected for the Black Ferns squad to the 2017 Rugby World Cup in Ireland. In 2018, she was one of 28 players that signed professional contracts with the Black Ferns for the first time. She studied carpentry in 2019 while playing for Northland in the Farah Palmer Cup competition.

=== 2021 ===
Subritzky-Nafatali was named in the first Hurricanes Poua squad to compete in the inaugural season of Super Rugby Aupiki in 2022.

=== 2022 ===
Subritzky-Nafatali played for Ratawa, in a Black Ferns trial match, against Ngalingali. She helped her side win 59–5 at Navigation Homes Stadium in Pukekohe.

In August, She returned to the Black Ferns for the two-test series against Australia for the Laurie O'Reilly Cup. She returned to Otago for the 2022 Farah Palmer Cup season after stints with Counties-Manukau and Northland.

=== 2023 ===
Subritzky-Nafatali re-signed with Hurricanes Poua for the 2023 Super Rugby Aupiki season.

== Personal life ==
In July 2020, Subritzky-Nafatali pleaded guilty to a charge of drink driving, following an incident in Dunedin earlier in May. In October, the Court granted her a discharge without conviction. In 2022, she was caught drink-driving for a second time.
