= Sarah Hirini =

New Zealand rugby union player

Sarah Hirini MNZM
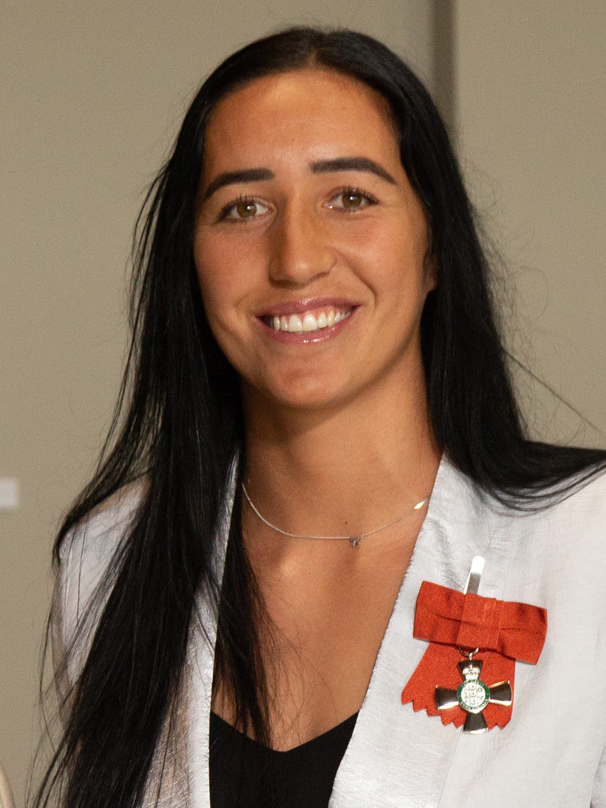
- Hirini in 2019
- Born: Sarah Goss; 9 December 1992 (age 33) Feilding, New Zealand
- Height: 1.68 m (5 ft 6 in)
- Weight: 72 kg (159 lb)
- School: Feilding High School
- University: Massey University
- Occupation: Professional sportswoman

Rugby union career
- Position: Forward
Provincial / State sides
Years	Team	Apps	(Points)
2011–2013	Manawatu	13	(23)
Super Rugby
Years	Team	Apps	(Points)
2022	Hurricanes Poua	2	(0)
International career
Years	Team	Apps	(Points)
2016–	New Zealand	17	(20)
National sevens team
Years	Team		Comps
2012–	New Zealand		283 apps
Medal record
Representing New Zealand
Women's rugby union
Women's Rugby World Cup
Gold medal – first place	2017 Ireland	Team competition
Gold medal – first place	2021 New Zealand	Team competition
Women's rugby sevens
Olympic Games
Gold medal – first place	2024 Paris	Team competition
Gold medal – first place	2020 Tokyo	Team competition
Silver medal – second place	2016 Rio de Janeiro	Team competition
Commonwealth Games
Gold medal – first place	2018 Gold Coast	Team competition
Bronze medal – third place	2022 Birmingham	Team competition
Rugby World Cup Sevens
Gold medal – first place	2013 Moscow	Team competition
Gold medal – first place	2018 San Francisco	Team competition
Silver medal – second place	2022 Cape Town	Team competition

Sarah Hirini MNZM (née Goss; born 9 December 1992) is a New Zealand women's rugby union player. She has played fifteen-a-side and seven-a-side rugby union, as a member of the New Zealand women's national rugby sevens team and New Zealand women's national rugby union team. Hirini was captain of the New Zealand Women's Sevens team that won a silver medal at the 2016 Summer Olympics in Rio de Janeiro and back-to-back gold medals at the 2020 Summer Olympics in Tokyo and at the 2024 Summer Olympics in Paris. During her time with the team they won the World Rugby Women's Sevens Series in 2012–13, 2013–14, 2014–15, 2016–17, 2018–19, 2019–20 and 2022–23 as well as the Sevens league title for the 2023-24 season. As of 2025 she has played the most games for the team.

She was also a member of the fifteen-a-side 2017 and 2021 New Zealand Rugby World Cup winning squads.

== Early life ==
Hirini was born on 9 December 1992 to Ronnie and Alan Goss. Her sister Rachael Rakatau also plays rugby and played for the Manawatū Cyclones in the Farah Palmer Cup championship in 2021.

Her father Alan was a champion shearer who won a Golden Shears title in the 1985 intermediate shearing final. Her mother Ronnie was a master wool handler, winning 53 open finals, including the 2008 Golden Shears open title, as well as competing in the New Zealand open championships finals in Te Kuiti in 1999 and 2003, in the Golden Shears open final six times, the 2014 world championships in Ireland, and represented New Zealand in ten trans-Tasman wool handling test matches. She grew up in a sports-loving household in the Oroua Valley, just out of Feilding. Her secondary school education was undertaken at Feilding High School, where she boarded.

When she was young Hirini competed in shearing contests alongside her brother Simon. After leaving high school having obtained a scholarship she commenced full time studies at Massey University, undertaking a Bachelor of Arts in Māori and sports science. However following selection for the national Sevens team, for the next eight years she completed her studies part-time, graduating with a degree in Maori studies.

== Rugby career ==
At secondary school she initially played field hockey, but began playing rugby in 2006 at the age of 13 after she accompanied some friends who were attending rugby tryouts. "I thought it'd be good fitness for my hockey and also, if I did one more sport I didn't have to go to homework class after school."

She progressed to playing for the Manawatu Secondary School Girls team from 2007 to 2010, and it was while she was captain in 2010, that they won the regional competition without any points scored against them. She also played for the Hurricanes Secondary School Girls team in 2008.

At the end of her secondary education she was so passionate about rugby that she wanted to play it full time, but with no obvious professional career path for women in rugby, she continued played it for the Feilding Old Boys Oroua Club as an amateur. Among the representative teams she played for, was Manawatu in the Women's Provincial Championship in 2010 and 2011 and the Aotearoa Māori sevens team also in 2010 and 2011.

In 2012 the New Zealand Rugby Union organized a nationwide "Go for Gold" grassroots initiative to identify talent with the potential to represent New Zealand in the Sevens competition at the 2016 Summer Olympics, where rugby sevens was making its debut.

Hirini who was in her second year of study at Massey University at the time, attended one of the trials where along with the other participants she was put through various fitness, speed, rugby skill and character assessment activities. Of the 800 who attended a trial, Hirini was among the 30 deemed promising who attended a training camp at Waiouru in mid-2012.

=== 2012-2013 Seven Series season ===
Hirini was selected to join Lauren Burgess, Marama Davis, Lavinia Gould, Carla Hohepa, Chyna Hohepa, Linda Itunu, Kayla McAlister, Huriana Manuel (captain), Tyla Nathan Wong, Amanda Rasch and Portia Woodman in New Zealand's team for inaugural 2012–13 IRB Women's Sevens World Series. As a result, Hirini obtained a full time one year New Zealand Sevens contract, which paid $30,000. Captained by Manuel the team won the series following a fourth at Houston and wins at Guangzhou and Amsterdam having scored 169 points and conceded 34.

in 2013 she captained the Manawatu Sevens side that took out the 2013 National Women's Sevens title in Queenstown.

=== Promoted to captain ===
After captain Huriana Manuel suffered a serious ankle injury in pool play against the USA at the fifteen-a-side 2014 Women's Rugby World Cup, which ruled her out of playing for the Sevens team Hirini was promoted to captain and was to retain the role even after Manuel returned to the team.

Her first tournament as captain was at Dubai in early December 2014. In pool play against Russia she dislocated her little finger which caused the bone to protrude out of the skin and the rest of the finger to point at a 45-degree angle. She remained on the sidelines during the quarterfinal, before returning to lead her team play in the semifinal and final. In the final against Australia at the Dubai tournament in early December 2014 New Zealand was 17–0 down at half-time, but came back to a score of 17–14 with a minute to play. With time up on the clock Hirini scored a match winning try to give her team a 19–17 victory.

=== 2016 Rio Olympic Games ===
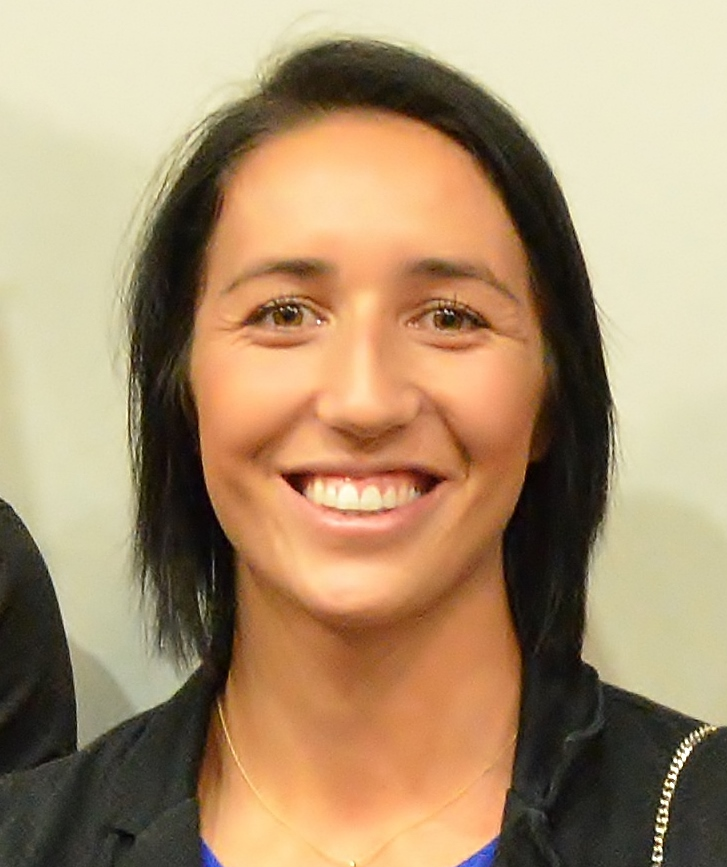
Sarah Hirini in 2016

In 2016 she captained the New Zealand Women's Rugby Sevens team that won a silver medal at the Rio Olympics.

She made her debut for the fifteen-a-side Black Ferns team in their game against Australia at Auckland on 22 October 2016 and then played them again on 26 October.

=== 2017 World Cup ===
She was a member of the fifteen-a-side Black Ferns team for the 2017 Women's Rugby World Cup squad. The Black Ferns went on to win the World Cup.

Hirini didn't play for the fifteen-a-side Black Ferns again until 2021, due to a combination of sevens commitments and the COVID-19 pandemic.

=== 2018 Gold Coast Commonwealth Games ===
Hirini was selected in the New Zealand Sevens squad at the 2018 Commonwealth Games. The 2018 tournament was the first time that women's rugby sevens was contested at the Commonwealth Games. The Black Ferns won gold in extra-time, beating Australia 17–12.

=== 2020 Tokyo Olympic Games ===
Hirini was selected as a playing member of the Black Ferns Sevens for the Rugby sevens at the 2020 Summer Olympics. She was then selected to join Hamish Bond in being New Zealand's flagbearers at the opening ceremony. Due to a racing the next day Bond was replaced by David Nyika. Due to Covid restrictions on how many could enter the Olympic Village at a time eleven of the players and management including Hirini were due to fly from Townsville, where they had been competing in the 2021 Oceania Women's Sevens Championship) in order to ensure Hirini would be able to attend the opening ceremony. They would be joined later by the rest of the team. After their first flight was cancelled the eleven missed their connection in Brisbane, which led to their 24-hour pre-departure tests expiring. Eventually a way was found of getting Hirani accompanied by Portia Woodman to Tokyo in time to participate in the opening ceremony.

=== 2022 Birmingham Commonwealth Games ===
Hirini was named in the Black Ferns Sevens squad for the 2022 Commonwealth Games in Birmingham. She won a bronze medal at the event. She also won a silver medal at the Rugby World Cup Sevens in Cape Town.

=== 2021 World Cup ===
Hirini was a member of the Black Ferns 32-player squad for the 2021 Rugby World Cup. She scored a try in the final pool game against a scoreless Scotland who were beaten 57–0. She also scored a try against Wales in the quarterfinals. She played in the semi-final against France and then the final in which the Black Ferns beat England to become World Champions.

=== 2022–23 World Rugby Women's Sevens Series ===
As the result of a rest after her appearances in the 2021 World Cup she missed the first two games of the 2022–23 Sevens series season before returning to captain the team in the last five games of season which ended with New Zealand winning the title, having won six of the seven tournaments.

At the end of the international season she took up the enquiry of her former Black Ferns team-mate Janna Vaughan who was head coach of the Yokkaichi based team Mie Pearls, to play for them between May and July in the Japanese Taiyo Seimei Women's Sevens competition.

Following her time in Japan Hirini returned to the New Zealand sevens duty leading the team to victory in the inaugural Abu Dhabi Sevens Festival held in late November 2023.

In the first game of the first tournament of the 2023–24 World Rugby SVNS Series held in Dubai held on 2–3 December 2023 it was only a late try by Hirini that prevented an upset defeat to South Africa. During their second game of the tournament Hirini and her team overwhelmed Great Britain 43–7 at the expense of Hirini rupturing the anterior cruciate ligament in right knee, which ruled her out of playing in the rest of the tournament. Following the end of the tournament she received an emotional haka and farewell from her teammates before she was evaluated back to New Zealand, where on 15 December she underwent surgery to repair her anterior cruciate ligament. With Hirini out of action Risi Pouri-Lane took over the captaincy of the Black Ferns.

It was expected that she would miss the Paris Olympics which were seven months away as recovery from a ACL injury typically takes nine to twelve months. By the end of the regular season she was back to non-contact training with the team and attended the grand final tournament in Madrid on the weekend of the 31 May and 2 June 2024 as an observer.

=== 2024 Paris Olympic Games ===
On 20 June 2024 it was announced that she had been selected as a member of the New Zealand Women’s Rugby Sevens team for the Paris Olympics. Hirini co-captained the team with Risi Pouri-Lane.

The team went undefeated though the competition. In the final against Canada she took a heavy knock to her face but continued to play on despite the pain, and soon after made a break that allowed Stacey Waaka to score and seal the team’s 19–12 victory over Canada, which gave Hirini her second gold medal. A scan after the day after the game found that she had multiple fractures in her face, which medical advice identified would heal with rest.

=== 2024 onwards ===
Following New Zealand's success at the Olympics Hirini continued to captain the team in the 2024-2025 sevens series, during which they won both the league and championship titles. At the 2025 Hong Kong tournament held on 28–30 March 2025 Hirini scored her 100th try in the sevens series in the teams 31-7 win against Brazil in pool play.

Following the end of the international sevens season Hirini spent from June to September 2025 playing for the Mie Pearls in Japan's Taiyo Seimei Women’s 7s Series. The team's head coach was her husband Conor Hirini, while playing alongside her was fellow Black Fern Olive Watherston, as well as Brazilians Talia Costa and Gabriela Lima.

She missed the 2024-2025 sevens series due to pregnancy.

In September 2026 the 33 year old Hirini signed a contract with New Zealand Rugby that would see her available to play sevens for another two years until the end of 2028. The signing confirmed her as New Zealand Rugby's longest serving professional women's rugby player.

== Awards and honours ==
In 2013, she received the Massey University Manawatu campus sportswoman of-the-year award.

In the 2019 Queen's Birthday Honours, Hirini was appointed a Member of the New Zealand Order of Merit, for services to rugby. She was nominated, for the fourth time in six years, as the World Rugby Women's Sevens Player of the Year.

In December 2019 she was the first women to win the Tom French Memorial Māori player of the year award.

She was the first woman to play 200 matches in the global circuit. Her mother, sister and niece made the trip to the south of France to witness her 200th game.

In 2022, she became the third woman to appear on the cover of the New Zealand Rugby Almanack.

At the 2023 World Rugby Sevens Series Awards in May of that year Hirini was named as a member of the 2023 women's dream team.

== Personal life ==
Of Māori descent, she affiliates to the Ngāti Kahungunu iwi. She married Conor Hirini in January 2019.

While based at Mount Maunganui, she obtained her private pilot's license in 2021, after three years of study.

On 2 November 2025 she announced that she was pregnant with her first child, subsequently giving birth in early May 2026 to a son, Masaru Melvin Hirini.

Awards
Preceded by Codie Taylor	Tom French Memorial; Māori rugby union player of the year 2019; 2021	Succeeded by Ash Dixon
Preceded by Ash Dixon	Tom French Memorial; Māori rugby union player of the year 2019; 2021	Succeeded by Ruahei Demant
Olympic Games
Preceded by Peter Burling	Flagbearer for New Zealand; Tokyo 2020; With: David Nyika	Succeeded by Jo Aleh & Aaron Gate
