= Toka Natua =

NZ & Cook Islands dual-code international rugby player

- Born: 22 November 1991 (age 34) Tokoroa, New Zealand
- Height: 1.70 m (5 ft 7 in)
- Weight: 96 kg (15 st 2 lb)

Rugby union career
- Position: Prop
Provincial / State sides
Years	Team	Apps	(Points)
2014–2024	Waikato	49	(30)
Super Rugby
Years	Team	Apps	(Points)
2023	Blues Women	5	(0)
International career
Years	Team	Apps	(Points)
2015–2020	New Zealand	24	(25)
- Rugby league career

Playing information
- Position: Prop
Representative
Years	Team	Pld	T	G	FG	P
2017–2022	Cook Islands	4
Medal record
Women's rugby union
Representing New Zealand
Women's Rugby World Cup
Gold medal – first place	2017 Ireland	Team competition

Toka Natua (born 22 November 1991) is a New Zealand rugby footballer. She has represented New Zealand in rugby union and the Cook Islands in rugby league. She played for the Blues Women in the Super Rugby Aupiki competition.

== Rugby career ==
=== 2015–16 ===
Natua made her debut for the New Zealand women's national rugby union team, the Black Ferns, in 2015 against Canada. In 2016, She scored a try in the win over the Wallaroos in the second Laurie O'Reilly Cup match.

=== 2017 ===
Natua scored a hat-trick and was also cited for foul play, in New Zealand's victory over England in the final of the 2017 Women's Rugby World Cup. She then represented the Cook Islands at the 2017 Women's Rugby League World Cup in Australia.

=== 2019–20 ===
In 2019, she was part of the Black Ferns team that won the Women's Rugby Super Series. In 2020, she was named in the Black Ferns squad that took on the New Zealand Barbarians in Waitakere.

=== 2022 ===
In 2022, Natua was selected for the Cook Islands squad at the 2021 Women's Rugby League World Cup.

=== 2023 ===
Natua joined the Blues Women for the 2023 Super Rugby Aupiki season. At the end of 2023, she will be joining her partner, Pita Gus Sowakula, and their one-year-old daughter in Clermont, France. She will be signing with the Clermont women’s side.

== Personal life ==
Natua is of Cook island descent and was born in Tokoroa. She is a graphic designer.

== Honours ==
- Women's Rugby World Cup: winner 2017
