= Louise Burrows =

Australian rugby union player

- Born: Louise Cooke; 11 March 1978 (age 48) Canberra, ACT
- Height: 1.65 m (5 ft 5 in)
- Weight: 65 kg (143 lb)

Rugby union career
- Position(s): Hooker, Prop
Amateur team(s)
Years	Team	Apps	(Points)
	Royals Rugby		(0)
Super Rugby
Years	Team	Apps	(Points)
2020–2024	Brumbies		(0)
International career
Years	Team	Apps	(Points)
2001–2017	Australia	22	(0)

Louise Burrows (née Cooke; born 11 March 1978) is a former Australian rugby union player. She represented Australia at four Rugby World Cups — 2002, 2006, 2014 and 2017.

== Rugby career ==
Burrows played her first game of rugby at a School Girls Gala Day in 1994. In 1995, she joined the Royals Rugby Union club in Canberra when she was 17. She also played her first representative game for the ACT women’s rugby team that year.

She was selected in the first Brumbies women’s team in 1996 and represented them until 2022, having played over 150 games for the side.

Burrows made her international debut for the Wallaroos against England in 2001 at Sydney.

She competed for Australia at the 2002 and 2006 Women's Rugby World Cups. In 2010, she attended the Wallaroos camp for the 2010 Rugby World Cup, but didn't make the final cut.

Burrows also played at the 2014 Women's Rugby World Cup in France. She played her last test at the 2017 World Cup against Canada.

In 2018, she was a member of the Brumbies women's team in the inaugural Super W competition. In January 2020, she joined the Brumbies squad for the Super W competition.

She was inducted in the University of Canberra’s new Sport Walk of Fame in 2022. After more than three decades of playing representative rugby, she announced her retirement from the sport on 19 March 2024.

== Personal life ==
Burrows is a physical education teacher at Canberra Girls Grammar. She and her husband, Mick, have two children, Fletcher and Georgie. She is an inaugural inductee of the University of Canberra Sports Walk of Fame in 2022.

She completed a Bachelor of Secondary Education degree at the University of Canberra in 2008.
