= Charlene Halapua =

New Zealand rugby union player

- Born: 17 January 1988 (age 38) Tofoa, Tonga
- Height: 1.71 m (5 ft 7 in)
- Weight: 89 kg (196 lb)

Rugby union career
- Position: Lock
Senior career
Years	Team	Apps	(Points)
2018	Brumbies women		
Provincial / State sides
Years	Team	Apps	(Points)
2012–2015	Auckland	23	(25)
International career
Years	Team	Apps	(Points)
2015–2017	New Zealand	9	(5)

Charlene Gubb (née Halapua, born 17 January 1988) is a New Zealand rugby union player. She scored a try on her debut for New Zealand against Canada at the 2015 Women's Rugby Super Series in Calgary. She started in all three games of the series.

== Early life and career ==
Gubb was born in Tofoa, Tonga, and migrated to New Zealand at the age of 11. She attended Massey High School.

Gubb played netball for North Auckland and Waitakere before switching to rugby. Her husband Charlie Gubb played for the Warriors and Raiders in the NRL.

== Rugby career ==
Gubb made her international debut for the Black Ferns in 2015.

She came off the bench in the Black Ferns 67–3 thrashing of Australia in 2016. She also featured in the second test match as the Wallaroos went down 29–3. She was named in the Black Ferns squad for their November tour of England, Canada and Ireland. She featured in all three victories, narrowly beating the English 25–20 and winning against the Canadians and Irish in Dublin.

In 2018 Gubb turned out for the Brumbies women in the Super W competition. In June 2022, she was one of 26 Black Ferns who were officially capped at a special event in Auckland.
