= Angie Sisifa =

- Born: 16 October 1989 (age 37) Takapuna
- Height: 1.74 m (5 ft 9 in)
- Weight: 83 kg (183 lb)

Rugby union career
- Position: Loose forward
Provincial / State sides
Years	Team	Apps	(Points)
2011–2017	Otago	46	(65)
2019–Present	Canterbury	14	(15)
International career
Years	Team	Apps	(Points)
2015–	New Zealand	7	(0)

Angie Sisifa (born 16 November 1989) is a New Zealand rugby union player. She debuted for New Zealand against Canada at the 2015 Women's Rugby Super Series in Calgary. She also featured in the matches against England and the United States.

== Biography ==
Sisifa is originally from New Plymouth, she moved to Dunedin in 2008 to attend the University of Otago where she studied for a degree in physical education. From 2011 to 2017 she played in 46 games for Otago before switching to Canterbury in 2019.

In 2016 Sisifa was named in the Black Ferns squad for two-test series against Australia. She only featured in the second test match which they won 29–3.

Sisifa was then selected for the Black Ferns November tour of the United Kingdom. She came off the bench in their victories against England and Canada but started in their 38–8 win over Ireland.

Sisifa made the training squad for the 2017 Women's Rugby World Cup but missed out on selection for the Black Ferns final squad.
