= Aotearoa Mata'u =

- Born: 2 May 1997 (age 29)
- Height: 1.85 m (6 ft 1 in)
- Weight: 133 kg (293 lb)

Rugby union career
- Position(s): Prop, Loose forward
Provincial / State sides
Years	Team	Apps	(Points)
2013–2020	Counties Manukau	46	(120)
International career
Years	Team	Apps	(Points)
2016–2017	New Zealand	8	(5)
Medal record
Women's rugby union
Representing New Zealand
Women's Rugby World Cup
Gold medal – first place	2017 Ireland	Team competition

Aotearoa Mata'u (born 2 May 1997) is a New Zealand rugby union player. She played Prop for New Zealand internationally and for Counties Manukau provincially.

== Rugby career ==
Mata'u was selected in the Black Ferns 28-player squad that played the Wallaroos in a two-test series in October 2016. She made her international debut for New Zealand on 22 October 2016 against Australia in Auckland. She scored her only international try in a test against Canada on 23 November 2016.

She was named in the Black Ferns squad for the 2017 Rugby World Cup in Ireland.

In 2018, Mata'u featured in a YouTube video that highlighted her fending off five defenders in a try-scoring run by the giant prop for her Portuguese club, Sporting.
