= Chloe Butler =

Australian rugby union player (born 1987)

- Born: 11 April 1987 (age 39)
- Height: 1.77 m (5 ft 9 1/2 in)
- Weight: 73 kg (161 lb; 11 st 7 lb)

Rugby union career
- Position(s): Lock, Flanker
Amateur team(s)
Years	Team	Apps	(Points)
- ACT
–	Parramatta Two Blues		
International career
Years	Team	Apps	(Points)
2014–2017	Australia	14	(0)

Chloe Butler (born 11 April 1987) is a female rugby union player and former gridiron football player.

== Early life ==
Butler grew up on a cattle property in Croydon, Queensland, Australia. Butler, who started out in running and gymnastics before getting injured, moved to Canberra to train at the AIS when she also become a Canberra Raiders cheerleader, and left Canberra in 2010 to pursue opportunities in the first season of the Lingerie Football League (LFL).

== Playing career ==
=== American football / gridiron career ===
Butler joined Los Angeles Temptation of the Lingerie Football League for the 2011–12 LFL season, playing as a wide receiver and defensive end. She captained the New South Wales Surge, Western Conference squad for the 2012 LFL All-Fantasy Game Tour.

==== LFL statistics ====
Year	Team	Tckl	Solo	Ast	Sacks	TFL	Int	Yards	Avg	Long	TD	FF	FR
2011–12	Los Angeles Temptation												
2013	Los Angeles Temptation	19	8	19	7	0	0	110	0	110	5	0	0

=== Rugby union career ===
Butler formerly played for the Australian Capital Territory, Parramatta Two Blues and currently for the Wallaroos. She has been selected in the Wallaroos squad to the 2014 Women's Rugby World Cup. Butler was part of the first ever women's Bledisloe Cup double header before the All Blacks vs the Wallabies in 2016. Butler played No.5. Butler played Openside flanker against England and Canada and no. 6 against the Black Ferns in the Women's Four Nations tour in New Zealand in June 2017. Butler played in the 2017 Women's Rugby World Cup in Ireland for Australia. She played lock and open side flanker. Butler has 14 caps for Australia. In October 2017 Butler moved to England to play for south west London club Richmond FC in the Tyrrrell's Women's Rugby Championship. She made her debut, as a No. 8, on October 21st at the Athletic Ground in a defeat versus Saracens. She now plays for Harlequins.

==== WRWC 2017 statistics ====
Year	Team	Tackles	Tackle Success (%)	Carries Over Gainline	Matches	Tries	Turn Overs Won
2017	Australia	75	90	28	5	0	1

== Personal life ==
Butler dated Penrith Panthers and South Sydney Rabbitohs player Tim Grant.

Butler currently plays rugby union in the Tyrrell's Premier 15s league for Harlequins and resides in London, England with three fellow rugby playing housemates.
