= Selica Winiata =

NZ international rugby union player

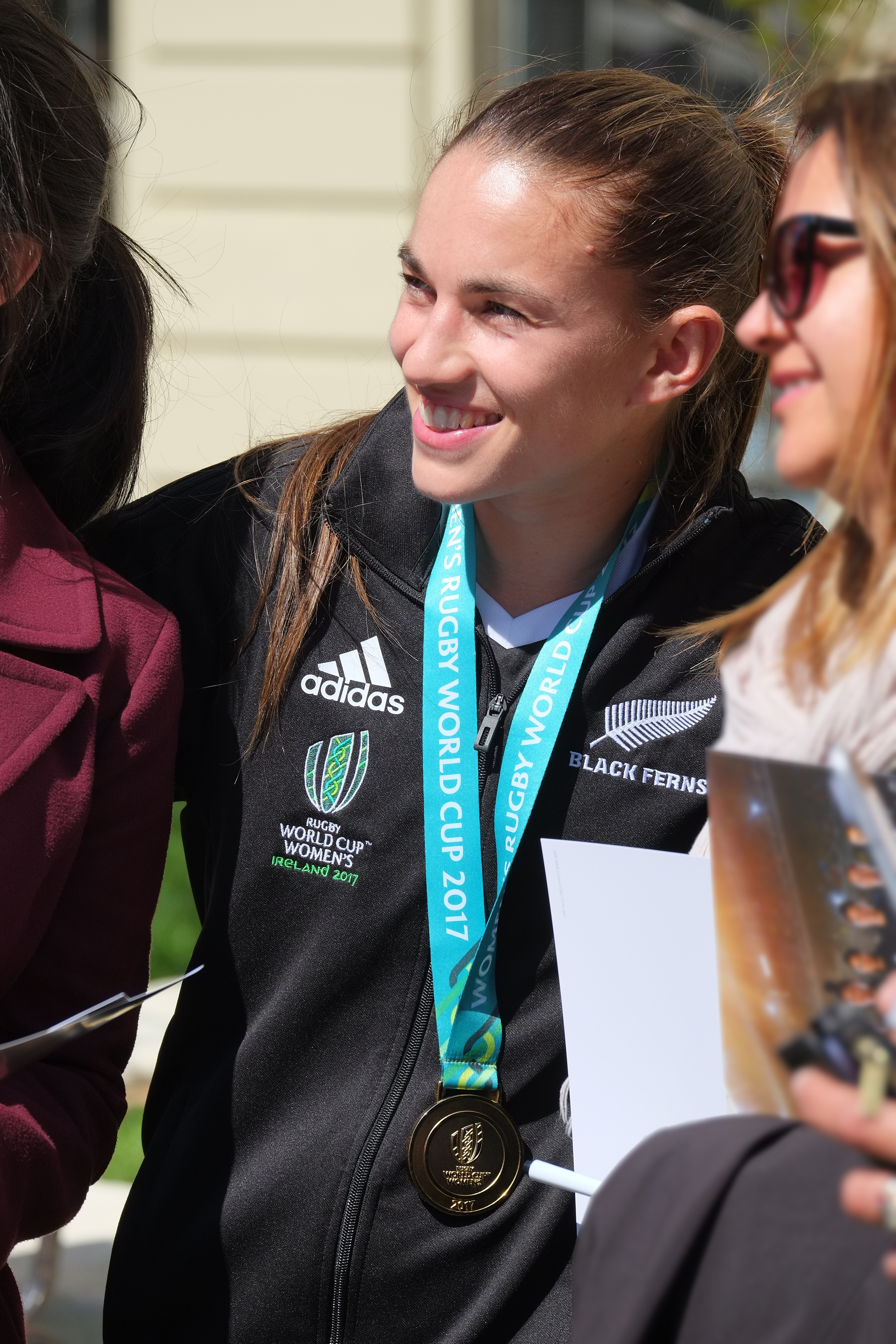
- Winiata in 2017
- Born: 14 November 1986 (age 40) Levin, New Zealand
- Height: 1.55 m (5 ft 1 in)
- Weight: 58 kg (128 lb)

Rugby union career
- Position: Utility Back
Provincial / State sides
| Years | Team | Apps | (Points) |
| 2007–2024 | Manawatu Cyclones | 100 | (598) |
Super Rugby
| Years | Team | Apps | (Points) |
| 2022 | Hurricanes Poua | 1 | (0) |
International career
| Years | Team | Apps | (Points) |
| 2008–2019 | New Zealand | 40 | (195) |
National sevens team
| Years | Team | | Comps |
| 2008–present | New Zealand | | 53 (269) |
Medal record
Women's rugby union
Representing New Zealand
Women's Rugby World Cup
| Gold medal – first place | 2017 Ireland | Team competition |
Sevens World Cup
| Silver medal – second place | 2009 Dubai | Team competition |
| Gold medal – first place | 2013 Moscow | Team competition |

Selica Winiata (born 14 November 1986) is a New Zealand Rugby union player and referee. She plays for the Black Ferns, the Black Ferns Sevens and provincially for the Manawatu Cyclones. She was part of the Black Ferns 2014 and Champion 2017 Rugby World Cup squads. She won a silver medal with the Black Ferns Sevens team at the inaugural women's 2009 Rugby World Cup Sevens tournament and a gold medal at the 2013 Rugby World Cup Sevens.

== Rugby career ==
=== XVs ===
Winiata attended Freyberg High School and made her provincial debut for the Manawatū Cyclones in 2001, aged 14. She made her international debut for the Black Ferns in 2008 against the Wallaroos.

Winiata appeared in three Tests against England in July 2013. She scored a dramatic winning-try in the second test to help New Zealand clinch the series against England in Hamilton.

She competed at the 2014 Women's Rugby World Cup. She was included in New Zealand's squad to play at the 2015 Women's Rugby Super Series.

In 2016, She featured against the Wallaroos in the Laurie O'Reilly Cup where she scored four tries in the first test, and one try in the second. In November that year, She scored two braces, against Canada and Ireland. She was named New Zealand Rugby women's player of the year for 2016.

Winiata competed at the 2017 Women's Rugby Super Series. She was named in the squad for the 2017 Rugby World Cup. She scored two tries in the final against England.

On 18 August 2018, She appeared for the Black Ferns side against Australia in a Bledisloe Cup double-header at Sydney. She featured at the 2019 Women's Rugby Super Series in San Diego. In August, She scored a try in her sides 47–10 victory over Australia in the opening of the Laurie O'Reilly Cup.

Winiata signed with the Hurricanes Poua for the inaugural 2022 season of Super Rugby Aupiki.

In 2023, She made her 100th appearance for the Manawatū Cyclones against Otago in the sixth round of the Farah Palmer Cup in Dunedin. She has scored 77 tries for the Cyclones, 14 of those tries were in 2012.

=== Sevens ===
Winiata was a member of the Black Ferns Sevens side for eight years and appeared in 15 tournaments, scoring 32 tries. She has also won two World Sevens Series titles and was part of the Aotearoa Maori Sevens team that won four Hong Kong Sevens titles.

In 2013, she was a member of the champion New Zealand women's sevens team at the Rugby World Cup Sevens.

=== Referee ===
Winiata made her international officiating debut at the 2019 Oceania Women’s Sevens in Fiji. She was appointed as a match official for two rounds of the 2019–20 Women's Sevens Series, she officiated at the Dubai and Cape Town tournaments in December.

She was one of three Kiwis selected on the refereeing panel that officiated at the women's tournament of the 2020 Summer Olympics.

== Personal life ==
Winiata is a New Zealander of Māori descent (Ngāti Raukawa descent). She was a Police officer in Palmerston North. In addition to being a Rugby Union player, referee and police officer (Senior Constable), she also works as a rugby commentator for Sky TV.
