= Kristina Sue =

NZ dual-code international rugby player

Personal information
- Born: 13 March 1987 (age 39)
- Height: 1.61 m (5 ft 3 in)
- Weight: 65 kg (10 st 3 lb; 143 lb)

Sport
- Sport: Touch
- Team: New Zealand

Rugby union career
- Position: Scrum half
Provincial / State sides
Years	Team	Apps	(Points)
	Manawatu Cyclones	7	
International career
Years	Team	Apps	(Points)
2016–	New Zealand	7	
National sevens team
Years	Team		Comps
2013	New Zealand 7s		2
- Rugby league career

Playing information
Representative
Years	Team	Pld	T	G	FG	P
2008	Kiwi Ferns
Medal record
Women's rugby union
Representing New Zealand
Women's Rugby World Cup
Gold medal – first place	2017 Ireland	Team competition

Kristina Sue (born 13 March 1987) is a New Zealand rugby union, rugby league and touch rugby player.

== Biography ==
Sue has represented New Zealand in all forms of rugby at a national level and is considered a quadruple rugby international. She represented New Zealand at the 2007 and 2011 Touch Football World Cup's.

In 2008, she was selected for the Kiwi Ferns squad to the Rugby League World Cup in Australia. She represented the Kiwi Ferns at the 2016 NRL Auckland Nines.

Sue was selected in the 28-player squad that played the Wallaroos in a two-test series in October 2016. She made her international debut for the Black Ferns on 22 October 2016 against Australia in Eden Park.

Sue was selected in the Black Ferns squad for the 2017 Rugby World Cup in Ireland.
