= Isabelle Noel-Smith =

England international rugby union player

Izzy Noel-Smith
- Born: 19 July 1988 (age 38)
- Height: 1.65 m (5 ft 5 in)
- Weight: 79 kg (174 lb; 12 st 6 lb)

Rugby union career
- Position: Loose forward
Senior career
Years	Team	Apps	(Points)
2013–present	Bristol Ladies	-	(-)
International career
Years	Team	Apps	(Points)
2011–2017	England	41	(25)
Medal record
Representing England
Women's rugby union
Rugby World Cup
Silver medal – second place	2017 Ireland	Team competition

Isabelle Leclere Noel-Smith (born 19 July 1988) is an English rugby union player. She made her debut for England in 2011. She was named in the 2017 Women's Rugby World Cup squad for England.

Noel-Smith attended Haberdashers' Monmouth School for Girls. She studied Coach Education and Sports Development at the University of Bath. She has a Postgraduate Certificate in Education and currently teaches at Paragon Junior School in Bath.
