= Lydia Thompson (rugby union) =

England international rugby union player

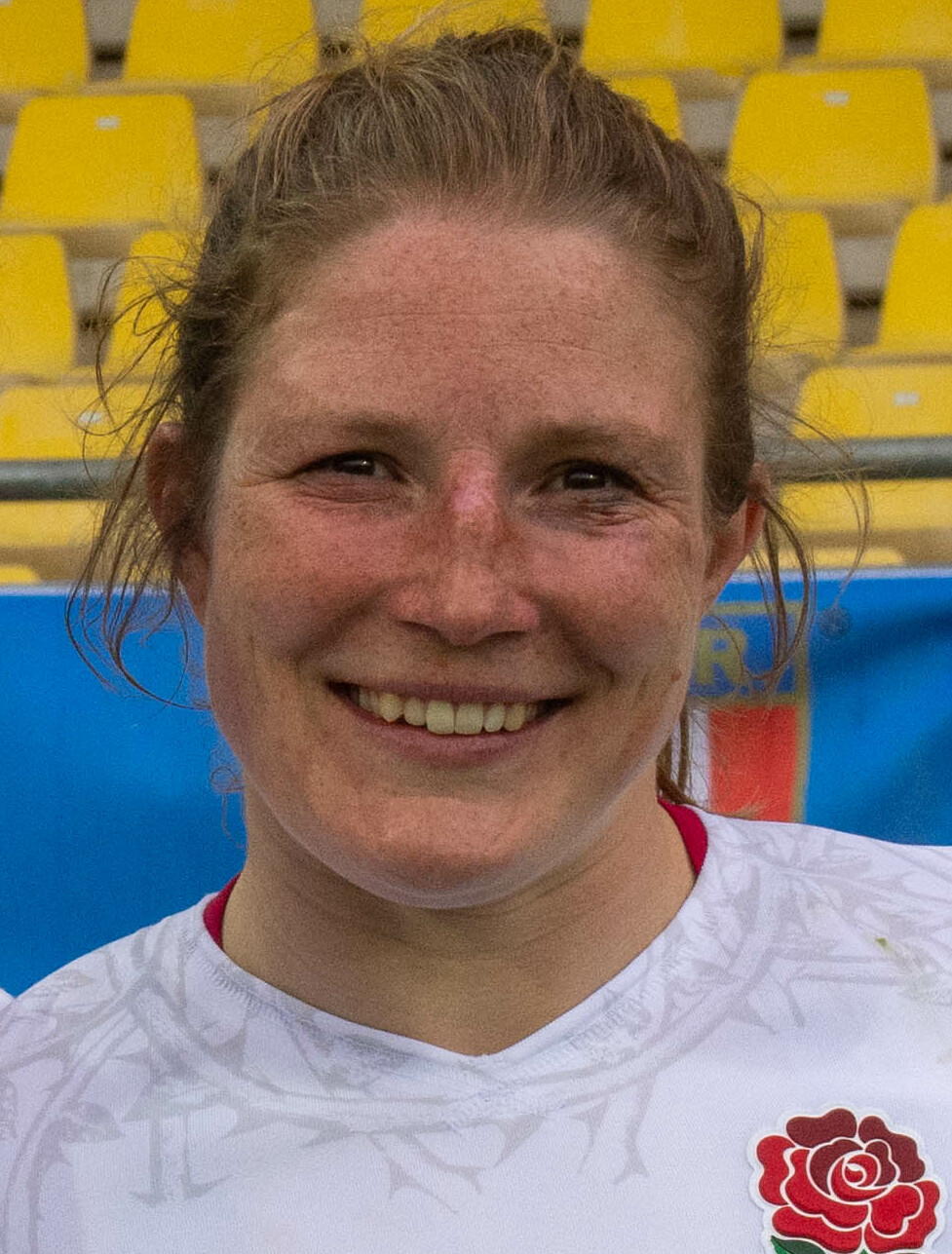
- Thompson in 2022
- Born: 10 February 1992 (age 34) Stourbridge, West Midlands, England
- Height: 1.70 m (5 ft 7 in)
- Weight: 72 kg (159 lb)

Rugby union career
- Position: Wing
Senior career
Years	Team	Apps	(Points)
2013	Worcester Warriors Women		
International career
Years	Team	Apps	(Points)
2012–	England	47	(180)
National sevens team
Years	Team		Comps
2018–2019	England		
Medal record
Representing England
Women's rugby sevens
Commonwealth Games
Bronze medal – third place	2018 Gold Coast	Team competition
Women's rugby union
Rugby World Cup
Gold medal – first place	2014 France	Team competition
Silver medal – second place	2021 New Zealand	Team competition
Silver medal – second place	2017 Ireland	Team competition

Lydia Bee Thompson (born 10 February 1992) is a member of the England Women's Rugby Team having made her debut in 2012. At club level, she plays for Worcester Warriors Women.

== International career ==
Thompson made her debut for England in 2012, running in three tries against Spain during the 2012 European Cup. She played in the opening pool game of the 2014 Women's Rugby World Cup but was ruled out of the tournament due to injury, though the team went on to win.

She returned to international rugby in 2017, helping England to win the 2017 Six Nations Championship grand slam, and playing in every game of the 2017 Women's Rugby World Cup. That same year, she was nominated for World Rugby Player of the Year.

She moved to Rugby sevens in 2018 to play for England in the 2018 Commonwealth Games, and returned to 15s for the Quilter Internationals in November that year.

Though she missed the 2019 Six Nations championship, Thompson returned to play all England games of the 2019 Super Series, and scored the winning try of the country's Quilter International match against France.

In 2020, she again represented her country in its 2020 Six Nations match against Wales before the championship was cut short due to the COVID-19 pandemic. She was named in the England squad for the delayed 2021 Rugby World Cup held in New Zealand in October and November 2022.

== Club career ==
Thompson joined the Worcester Warriors Women (previously Worcester Valkyries) in 2010 and continues to play for the team.

== Early life and education ==
Thompson was born in 1992 in Stourbridge. She began playing rugby at eleven years old.

She went to Ounsdale High School in Wombourne before completing her schooling at King Edward VI College, Stourbridge. She studied at Derby University gaining a degree in Occupational Therapy in 2013 . Thompson was awarded an Honorary Master of the University (HonMUniv) in July 2022 in recognition of her outstanding international rugby career Commendation .

Thompson worked as an occupational therapist for 2gether NHS Foundation Trust and applied to return to the NHS in April 2020 after the outbreak of COVID-19. Her husband, Tom, is also an occupational therapist.
