= Janna Vaughan =

NZ dual-code international rugby player

- Born: 17 July 1988 (age 38)
- Height: 1.69 m (5 ft 7 in)
- Weight: 67 kg (148 lb)

Rugby union career
- Position: Utility Back
Provincial / State sides
Years	Team	Apps	(Points)
2004–06; 2015–22	Manawatu	40	(125)
2007–2009	Otago	17	(5)
2015	Counties Manukau	1	(5)
Super Rugby
Years	Team	Apps	(Points)
2022	Hurricanes Poua	2	(0)
International career
Years	Team	Apps	(Points)
2015–2016	New Zealand	6	(10)
National sevens team
Years	Team		Comps
2016	New Zealand		
Coaching career
- Years: Team
- 2023–Present: Mie Pearls
- Rugby league career

Playing information
Representative
Years	Team	Pld	T	G	FG	P
2015	New Zealand	4				12

Janna Vaughan (born 17 July 1988) is a New Zealand athlete. She has represented New Zealand in rugby union, rugby league, rugby sevens and Muay Thai.

== Career ==
Vaughan was selected for Manawatu in 2004 while she was still a student at Freyberg High School in Palmerston North. She made 17 appearances for Manawatu before moving to Dunedin to train as a teacher in 2007. Between 2007 and 2009 Vaughan played in 17 games for Otago while also winning two bronze medals in the 60 kg class at the Muay Thai World Championships in 2007 and 2008. In 2009 she won New Zealand's kickboxing featherweight title and in March 2012 she became the national Muay Thai lightweight champion again.

Vaughan made her debut for the New Zealand women's national rugby league team at the 2015 NRL Auckland Nines. She scored a try in all three of the Kiwi Ferns games against the Jillaroos. She earned her full test cap for the Kiwi Ferns three months later against Australia at the 2015 ANZAC Test.

Two months after her Kiwi Ferns debut, Vaughan scored a try in her rugby union debut for New Zealand against Canada at the 2015 Women's Rugby Super Series in Calgary. She also featured in their 26–7 victory against England and scored a try in her third appearance in their 47–14 thrashing of the United States.

Vaughan was selected for the Black Ferns Sevens squad and debuted at the 2016 Canada Sevens in Langford, British Columbia. She was named in the Black Ferns squad for the two-test series against Australia in 2016. She only featured in their 67–3 trouncing of the Wallaroos in Eden Park. She was selected again for the Black Ferns tour of the United Kingdom. She appeared in their 20–10 win over Canada and in their 38–8 win over Ireland.

In 2018 Vaughan began her professional sevens career for the Mie Pearls in Japan. She captained the Black Ferns development 7s team at the 2018 Oceania Sevens Championship in Fiji. After two years in Japan Vaughan returned to play for Manawatu, last appearing for them in 2017.

In 2020 She appeared for the Possibles against the Probables in a Black Ferns trial match. She then played for the New Zealand Barbarians against the Black Ferns.

In 2022, Vaughan signed with Hurricanes Poua for the inaugural season of Super Rugby Aupiki. She featured in the Hurricanes debut match against the Chiefs Manawa.

== Coaching career ==
Vaughan was appointed as Head coach for Japanese club, the Mie Pearls in 2023.
