= History of women's rugby union matches between Australia and New Zealand =

Australia women and New Zealand women have played each other 29 times, with the Black Ferns winning every match between the two teams. They played their inaugural test match on the 2nd of September 1994 in Sydney, Australia. It was the Wallaroos first test and the Black Ferns fourth, with the latter winning that encounter (37–0). They have competed for the Laurie O'Reilly Cup since its inception in 1994 with the Black Ferns winning all 25 games. They have met at the Rugby World Cup in 2002, 2010, and at the delayed 2021 tournament hosted by New Zealand.

== Summary ==
=== Overall ===
Details	Played	Won by Australia	Won by New Zealand	Drawn	Australia points	New Zealand points
In Australia	11	0	11	0	74	401
In New Zealand	16	0	16	0	139	677
Neutral venue	2	0	2	0	8	68
Overall	29	0	29	0	221	1,146

=== Record ===
Note: Date shown in brackets indicates when the record was or last set.

Record	Australia	New Zealand
Longest winning streak	N/A	29 (2 September 1994–Present)
Largest points for
Home	16 (18 October 2008)	67 (22 October 2016)
Away	17 (8 October 2022)	50 (29 June 2023)
Neutral venue	5 (24 August 2010)	36 (18 May 2002)
Largest winning margin
Home	N/A	64 (22 October 2016)
Away	N/A	50 (29 June 2023)
Neutral venue	N/A	33 (18 May 2002)

== Results ==
No.	Date	Venue	Score	Winner	Competition
1	2 September 1994	North Sydney Oval, Sydney	0–37	New Zealand	1994 Laurie O'Reilly Cup
2	22 July 1995	Waitemata Park, Auckland	64–0	New Zealand	1995 Laurie O'Reilly Cup
3	31 August 1996	North Sydney Oval, Sydney	5–28	New Zealand	1996 Laurie O'Reilly Cup
4	16 August 1997	Carisbrook, Dunedin	40–0	New Zealand	1997 Laurie O'Reilly Cup
5	29 August 1998	Sydney Football Stadium, Sydney	3–27	New Zealand	1998 Laurie O'Reilly Cup
6	18 May 2002	Cornellà de Llobregat, Barcelona, Spain	3–36	New Zealand	2002 Women's Rugby World Cup
7	16 October 2007	Cooks Gardens, Wanganui	21–10	New Zealand	2007 Laurie O'Reilly Cup
8	20 October 2007	Porirua Park, Porirua	29–12	New Zealand	2007 Laurie O'Reilly Cup
9	14 October 2008	Viking Park, Canberra	3–37	New Zealand	2008 Laurie O'Reilly Cup
10	18 October 2008	Viking Park, Canberra	16–22	New Zealand	2008 Laurie O'Reilly Cup
11	24 August 2010	Surrey Sports Park, Guildford, England	32–5	New Zealand	2010 Women's Rugby World Cup
12	1 June 2014	Rotorua International Stadium, Rotorua	38–3	New Zealand	2014 Laurie O'Reilly Cup
13	22 October 2016	Eden Park, Auckland	67–3	New Zealand	2016 Laurie O'Reilly Cup
14	26 October 2016	North Harbour Stadium, Albany	29–3	New Zealand	2016 Laurie O'Reilly Cup
15	13 June 2017	Rugby Park, Christchurch	44–17	New Zealand	2017 Laurie O'Reilly Cup
16	18 August 2018	Stadium Australia, Sydney	11–31	New Zealand	2018 Laurie O'Reilly Cup
17	25 August 2018	Eden Park, Auckland	45–17	New Zealand	2018 Laurie O'Reilly Cup
18	10 August 2019	Perth Stadium, Perth	10–47	New Zealand	2018 Laurie O'Reilly Cup
19	17 August 2019	Eden Park, Auckland	37–8	New Zealand	2018 Laurie O'Reilly Cup
20	6 June 2022	Tauranga Domain, Tauranga	23–10	New Zealand	2022 Pacific Four Series
21	20 August 2022	Orangetheory Stadium, Christchurch	52–5	New Zealand	2022 Laurie O'Reilly Cup
22	27 August 2022	Adelaide Oval, Adelaide	14–22	New Zealand	2022 Laurie O'Reilly Cup
23	8 October 2022	Eden Park, Auckland	17–41	New Zealand	2021 Rugby World Cup
24	29 June 2023	Dolphin Stadium, Brisbane	0–50	New Zealand	2023 Pacific Four Series
25	30 September 2023	Waikato Stadium, Hamilton	43–3	New Zealand	2023 Laurie O'Reilly Cup
26	25 May 2024	North Harbour Stadium, Albany	67–19	New Zealand	2024 Pacific Four Series
27	14 July 2024	Ballymore Stadium, Brisbane	0–62	New Zealand	2024 Laurie O'Reilly Cup
28	10 May 2025	McDonald Jones Stadium, Newcastle	12–38	New Zealand	2025 Pacific Four Series
29	12 July 2025	Sky Stadium, Wellington	37–12	New Zealand	2025 Laurie O'Reilly Cup

== See also ==
- Laurie O'Reilly Cup
