= List of Australia women's national rugby union team matches =

The following is a list of Australia women's national rugby union team international matches.

== Overall ==
Australia's overall international match record against all nations, updated to 23 October 2026, is as follows:

	Played	Won	Drawn	Lost	Win %
Total	105	38	1	66	36.19%

== Full internationals ==
Won	Lost	Draw

=== 1990s ===
Test	Date	Opponent	PF	PA	Venue	Event
1	2 September 1994	New Zealand	0	37	North Sydney Oval, Sydney	1994 Laurie O'Reilly Cup
2	22 July 1995	New Zealand	0	64	Waitemata Park, Auckland	1995 Laurie O'Reilly Cup
3	31 August 1996	New Zealand	5	28	North Sydney Oval, Sydney	1996 Laurie O'Reilly Cup
4	2 August 1997	United States	24	28	Brisbane	
5	16 August 1997	New Zealand	0	44	Carisbrook, Dunedin	1997 Laurie O'Reilly Cup
6	2 May 1998	Ireland	21	0	Amsterdam	1998 World Cup
7	5 May 1998	France	8	10	Amsterdam	1998 World Cup
8	9 May 1998	England	13	30	Amsterdam	1998 World Cup
9	12 May 1998	Spain	17	15	Amsterdam	1998 World Cup
10	16 May 1998	Scotland	25	15	Amsterdam	1998 World Cup
11	29 August 1998	New Zealand	3	27	Sydney Football Stadium, Sydney	1998 Laurie O'Reilly Cup

=== 2000s ===
Test	Date	Opponent	PF	PA	Venue	Event
12	26 May 2001	England	19	41	TG Millner Field, Sydney	
13	2 June 2001	England	5	15	Newcastle, New South Wales	
14	13 May 2002	Wales	30	0	Barcelona	2002 World Cup
15	18 May 2002	New Zealand	3	36	Barcelona	2002 World Cup
16	21 May 2002	United States	17	5	Barcelona	2002 World Cup
17	25 May 2002	Scotland	30	0	Barcelona	2002 World Cup
18	31 August 2006	South Africa	68	12	Ellerslie Rugby Park, Edmonton	2006 World Cup
19	4 September 2006	France	10	24	Ellerslie Rugby Park, Edmonton	2006 World Cup
20	8 September 2006	United States	6	10	Ellerslie Rugby Park, Edmonton	2006 World Cup
21	12 September 2006	United States	12	29	St. Albert Rugby Park, St. Albert	2006 World Cup
22	16 September 2006	Ireland	18	14	Ellerslie Rugby Park, Edmonton	2006 World Cup
23	16 October 2007	New Zealand	10	21	Cooks Gardens, Wanganui	2007 Laurie O'Reilly Cup
24	20 October 2007	New Zealand	12	29	Porirua Park Stadium, Porirua	2007 Laurie O'Reilly Cup
25	14 October 2008	New Zealand	3	37	Viking Park, Canberra	2008 Laurie O'Reilly Cup
26	18 October 2008	New Zealand	16	22	Viking Park, Canberra	2008 Laurie O'Reilly Cup
27	8 August 2009	Samoa	87	0	Samoa	2010 World Cup Q

=== 2010s ===
Test	Date	Opponent	PF	PA	Venue	Event
28	20 August 2010	Wales	26	12	Surrey Sports Park, Guildford	2010 World Cup
29	24 August 2010	New Zealand	5	32	Surrey Sports Park, Guildford	2010 World Cup
30	28 August 2010	South Africa	62	0	Surrey Sports Park, Guildford	2010 World Cup
31	1 September 2010	England	0	15	Twickenham Stoop, London	2010 World Cup
32	5 September 2010	France	22	8	Twickenham Stoop, London	2010 World Cup
33	1 June 2014	New Zealand	3	38	Rotorua International Stadium, Rotorua	2014 Laurie O'Reilly Cup
34	6 June 2014	Canada	0	22	Tauranga	
35	1 August 2014	South Africa	26	3	CNR, Marcoussis	2014 World Cup
36	5 August 2014	Wales	25	3	CNR, Marcoussis	2014 World Cup
37	9 August 2014	France	3	17	CNR, Marcoussis	2014 World Cup
38	13 August 2014	United States	20	23	CNR, Marcoussis	2014 World Cup
39	17 August 2014	Wales	30	3	CNR, Marcoussis	2014 World Cup
40	22 October 2016	New Zealand	3	67	Eden Park, Auckland	2016 Laurie O'Reilly Cup
41	26 October 2016	New Zealand	3	29	QBE Stadium, North Shore	2016 Laurie O'Reilly Cup
42	9 June 2017	England	10	53	Porirua Park, Wellington	
43	13 June 2017	New Zealand	17	44	Rugby League Park, Christchurch	
44	17 June 2017	Canada	5	45	Smallbone Park, Rotorua	
45	9 August 2017	Ireland	17	19	UCD Bowl, Dublin	2017 World Cup
46	13 August 2017	France	0	48	UCD Bowl, Dublin	2017 World Cup
47	17 August 2017	Japan	21	15	UCD Bowl, Dublin	2017 World Cup
48	22 August 2017	Ireland	36	24	Ravenhill Stadium, Belfast	2017 World Cup
49	26 August 2017	Canada	12	43	Queen's University Belfast, Belfast	2017 World Cup
50	18 August 2018	New Zealand	11	31	Stadium Australia, Sydney	2018 Laurie O'Reilly Cup
51	25 August 2018	New Zealand	17	45	Eden Park, Auckland	2018 Laurie O'Reilly Cup
52	13 July 2019	Japan	34	5	Sportsground 2, Newcastle	
53	19 July 2019	Japan	46	3	North Sydney Oval, Sydney	
54	10 August 2019	New Zealand	10	47	Perth Stadium, Perth	2019 Laurie O'Reilly Cup
55	17 August 2019	New Zealand	8	37	Eden Park, Auckland	2019 Laurie O'Reilly Cup

=== 2022 ===
All planned test matches for the Wallaroos in 2020 were cancelled due to impacts of the COVID-19 pandemic, as was the September 2021 tour to New Zealand.

Test	Date	Opponent	PF	PA	Venue	Event
56	6 May 2022	Fiji	36	19	Lang Park, Brisbane	
57	10 May 2022	Japan	10	12	Bond University, Gold Coast	
58	5 June 2022	New Zealand	10	23	Tauranga Domain, Tauranga	2022 Pacific Four Series
59	12 June 2022	United States	14	16	The Trusts Arena, Auckland	2022 Pacific Four Series
60	18 June 2022	Canada	10	22	Okara Park, Whangārei	2022 Pacific Four Series
61	20 August 2022	New Zealand	5	52	Rugby League Park, Christchurch	2022 Laurie O'Reilly Cup
62	27 August 2022	New Zealand	14	22	Adelaide Oval, Adelaide	2022 Laurie O'Reilly Cup
63	8 October 2022	New Zealand	17	41	Eden Park, Auckland	2021 World Cup
64	15 October 2022	Scotland	14	12	Okara Park, Whangārei	2021 World Cup
65	22 October 2022	Wales	13	7	Okara Park, Whangārei	2021 World Cup
66	30 October 2022	England	5	41	The Trusts Arena, Auckland	2021 World Cup

=== 2023 ===
Test	Date	Opponent	PF	PA	Venue	Event
67	20 May 2023	Fiji	22	5	Sydney Football Stadium, Sydney	
68	29 June 2023	New Zealand	0	50	Dolphin Stadium, Brisbane	2023 Pacific Four Series
69	8 July 2023	United States	58	17	TD Place Stadium, Ottawa	2023 Pacific Four Series
70	15 July 2023	Canada	7	45	TD Place Stadium, Ottawa	2023 Pacific Four Series
71	30 September 2023	New Zealand	3	43	Waikato Stadium, Waikato	2023 Laurie O'Reilly Cup
72	20 October 2023	England	7	42	Wellington Regional Stadium, Wellington	2023 WXV 1
73	28 October 2023	France	29	20	Forsyth Barr Stadium, Dunedin	2023 WXV 1
74	3 November 2023	Wales	25	19	Mount Smart Stadium, Auckland	2023 WXV 1

=== 2024 ===
Test	Date	Opponent	PF	PA	Venue	Event
75	11 May 2024	Canada	14	33	Sydney Football Stadium, Sydney	2024 Pacific Four Series
76	17 May 2024	United States	25	32	Melbourne Rectangular Stadium, Melbourne	2024 Pacific Four Series
77	25 May 2024	New Zealand	19	67	North Harbour Stadium, Albany	2024 Pacific Four Series
78	6 July 2024	Fiji	64	5	Allianz Stadium, Sydney	
79	14 July 2024	New Zealand	0	62	Ballymore Stadium, Brisbane	2024 Laurie O'Reilly Cup
80	14 September 2024	Ireland	10	36	Kingspan Stadium, Belfast	
81	21 September 2024	Wales	24	31	Rodney Parade, Newport	
82	28 September 2024	Wales	37	5	DHL Stadium, Cape Town	2024 WXV 2
83	5 October 2024	South Africa	33	26	Athlone Stadium, Cape Town	2024 WXV 2
84	12 October 2024	Scotland	31	22	Athlone Stadium, Cape Town	2024 WXV 2

=== 2025 ===
Test	Date	Opponent	PF	PA	Venue	Event
85	3 May 2025	Fiji	43	7	HFC Bank Stadium, Suva	Test
86	10 May 2025	New Zealand	12	38	McDonald Jones Stadium, Newcastle, NSW	2025 Pacific Four Series
87	17 May 2025	United States	27	19	GIO Stadium, Canberra	2025 Pacific Four Series
88	23 May 2025	Canada	7	45	Suncorp Stadium, Brisbane	2025 Pacific Four Series
89	12 July 2025	New Zealand	12	37	Sky Stadium, Wellington	2025 Laurie O'Reilly Cup
90	26 July 2025	Wales	12	21	Ballymore Stadium, Brisbane	2025 World Cup Warm-Ups
91	1 August 2025	Wales	36	5	North Sydney Oval, Sydney	2025 World Cup Warm-Ups
92	23 August 2025	Samoa	73	0	Salford Community Stadium, Manchester	2025 World Cup
93	30 August 2025	United States	31	31	York Community Stadium, York	2025 World Cup
94	6 September 2025	England	7	47	Brighton & Hove Albion Stadium, Brighton	2025 World Cup
95	13 September 2025	Canada	5	46	Ashton Gate, Brighton	2025 World Cup

=== 2026 ===
Test	Date	Opponent	PF	PA	Venue	Event
96	27 March 2026	Fiji	33	15	Canberra Stadium, Canberra	Test
97	11 April 2026	Canada	0	24	Heart Health Park, Sacramento	2026 Pacific Four Series
98	17 April 2026	United States	12	33	CPKC Stadium, Kansas City	2026 Pacific Four Series
99	25 April 2026	New Zealand	5	40	Sunshine Coast Stadium, Kawana Waters	2026 Pacific Four Series
100	22 August 2026	New Zealand	19	66	Mount Smart Stadium, Auckland	2026 Laurie O'Reilly Cup
101	12 September 2026	England	15	48	CorpAcq Stadium, Salford	Away test series (2026 WXV)
102	19 September 2026	France	26	29	Stade Maurice David, Aix-en-Provence	Away test series (2026 WXV)
103	26 September 2026	Scotland	30	10	Hive Stadium, London	Away test series (2026 WXV)
104	17 October 2026	Scotland	56	12	Stadium Australia, Sydney	Home test series (2026 WXV)
105	23 October 2026	Scotland	38	31	Canberra Stadium, Canberra	Home test series (2026 WXV)

== Other matches ==
Date	Australia	Score	Opponent	Venue
18 October 2016	Australia	21–19	(New Zealand) Auckland Storm	Bell Park, Pakuranga
