= Laurie O'Reilly Cup =

Women's rugby trophy

O'Reilly Cup
- Upcoming season or competition: 2026 Laurie O'Reilly Cup
- Sport: Rugby union
- Founded: 1994; 32 years ago
- No. of teams: 2
- Countries: Australia; New Zealand
- Most recent champion: New Zealand (2025)
- Most titles: New Zealand (16 titles)

The Laurie O'Reilly Cup is the trophy competed for by the women's rugby union teams of Australia and New Zealand. The two nations met annually between 1994 and 1998, with New Zealand winning all games, often by significant margins, as a result of which the series fell into abeyance, but was revived in 2007.

== History ==
The Cup is named in honour of Laurie O’Reilly, New Zealand's first women's Selector and National coach who died in 1998. It was formerly known as the Laurie O'Reilly Memorial Trophy. It has been contested between New Zealand and Australia since its inception in 1994. The Black Ferns has won every fixture so far and are the current holders of the O’Reilly Cup with a total of 17 wins.

In 2018, the Black Ferns and the Wallaroos played both Tests as curtain-raisers to both Bledisloe Cup Tests in Sydney and Auckland. The crowd at the end of both women's Tests swelled to about 28,000. The women's double-header concept was deemed as a success by NZR CEO Steve Tew who is open to repeating the concept. For the equivalent match at Eden Park in 2016, also before the men's clash, the crowd size peaked at 12,500.

In 2020, All planned test matches for the Wallaroos were cancelled due to impacts of the COVID-19 pandemic, as was the September tour to New Zealand in 2021.

After a two-year absence due to the pandemic, it was confirmed that the competition would return. The Black Ferns hosted the first test and the Wallaroos the second test in 2022. The second match was played as a curtain raiser to the Wallabies and Springboks test in Adelaide. The Black Ferns won the first test in Christchurch and retained the O'Reilly Cup. They then won the series after winning the second test.

== Results ==
Year	Date	Home	Score	Away	Cup Winner	Venue	Event
1994	2 September	Australia	0–37	New Zealand	New Zealand	Sydney	
1995	22 July	New Zealand	64–0	Australia	New Zealand	Auckland	
1996	31 August	Australia	5–28	New Zealand	New Zealand	Sydney	
1997	16 August	New Zealand	44–0	Australia	New Zealand	Dunedin	
1998	29 August	Australia	3–27	New Zealand	New Zealand	Sydney	
2007	16 October	New Zealand	21–10	Australia	New Zealand	Cooks Gardens, Wanganui	
2007	20 October	New Zealand	29–12	Australia	New Zealand	Wellington	
2008	14 October	Australia	3–37	New Zealand	New Zealand	Canberra	
2008	18 October	Australia	16–22	New Zealand	New Zealand	Sydney	
2014	1 June	New Zealand	38–3	Australia	New Zealand	Rotorua International Stadium	
2016	22 October	New Zealand	67–3	Australia	New Zealand	Eden Park, Auckland	
2016	26 October	New Zealand	29–3	Australia	New Zealand	QBE Stadium, Auckland	
2017	13 June	New Zealand	44–17	Australia	New Zealand	Rugby Park, Christchurch	
2018	18 August	Australia	11–31	New Zealand	New Zealand	ANZ Stadium, Sydney	
2018	25 August	New Zealand	45–17	Australia	New Zealand	Eden Park, Auckland	
2019	10 August	Australia	10–47	New Zealand	New Zealand	Optus Stadium, Perth	
2019	17 August	New Zealand	37–8	Australia	New Zealand	Eden Park, Auckland	
2022	20 August	New Zealand	52–5	Australia	New Zealand	Orangetheory Stadium	
2022	27 August	Australia	14–22	New Zealand	New Zealand	Adelaide Oval	
2023	29 June	Australia	0–50	New Zealand	New Zealand	Brisbane	Pacific Four Series
2023	30 September	New Zealand	43–3	Australia	New Zealand	Waikato Stadium, Hamilton	
2024	25 May	New Zealand	67–19	Australia	New Zealand	North Harbour Stadium	Pacific Four Series
2024	14 July	Australia	0–62	New Zealand	New Zealand	Ballymore Stadium, Brisbane	
2025	10 May	Australia	12–38	New Zealand	New Zealand	McDonald Jones Stadium, Newcastle	Pacific Four Series
2025	12 July	New Zealand	37–12	Australia	New Zealand	Sky Stadium, Wellington	
2026	25 April	Australia	5–40	New Zealand	New Zealand	Sunshine Coast Stadium, Kawana Waters	
2026	22 August	New Zealand	66–19	Australia	New Zealand	Mount Smart Stadium, Auckland	

== Matches ==
Venue	Played	Won by		Drawn	Total points	
Venue	Played	Australia	New Zealand	Drawn	Australia	New Zealand
Australia	12	0	12	0	91	441
New Zealand	15	0	15	0	119	683
Overall	27	0	27	0	210	1,124

== See also ==
- Women's international rugby union
- Australia–New Zealand sports rivalries
- Bledisloe Cup
- Rugby union trophies and awards
