= 1996 Laurie O'Reilly Cup =

Australia	New Zealand
(Australia)	(New Zealand)
5	28
- Date: 31 August 1996
- Venue: North Sydney Oval, Sydney
- Referee: (Australia) Michael Keogh

The 1996 Laurie O'Reilly Cup was the third edition of the competition and was held on 31 August at Sydney. New Zealand retained the O'Reilly Cup after defeating Australia 5–28.

== Match ==
1996-08-31
14:30 AEST (UTC+10)

Australia	5–28	New Zealand
Try: Sharon Carson		Try: Karen Taylor; Helen Littleworth; Lenadeen Simpson-Brown; Kellie Kiwi; Davida White; Pen: Heidi Reader

Concord Oval, Sydney
