= 1994 Laurie O'Reilly Cup =

Australia	New Zealand
(Australia)	(New Zealand)
0	37
- Date: 2 September 1994
- Venue: North Sydney Oval, Sydney
- Referee: (Australia) Peter L. Marshall

The 1994 Laurie O'Reilly Cup was the first edition of the competition and was held on 2nd September at Sydney. New Zealand won the O'Reilly Cup after defeating Australia 0–37.

The match was the first official test for the Australia women's national rugby union team.

== Match ==
2 September 1994
14:30 AEST (UTC+10)

Australia	0–37	New Zealand
		Try: Geraldine Paul; Tasha Williams (2); Louisa Wall; Helen Littleworth (2); Monique Hirovanaa; Con: Vivian Rees

North Sydney Oval, Sydney

FB	15
RW	14
OC	13
IC	12
LW	11
FH	10
SH	9
N8	8
BF	7
OF	6
RL	5
LL	4
TP	3
HK	2
LP	1
Coach:

FB	15	Monique Hirovanaa
RW	14	Tasha Williams
OC	13	Vivian Rees
IC	12	Lenadeen Simpson
LW	11	Louisa Wall
FH	10	Jacqui Apiata
SH	9	Anna Richards
N8	8	Helen Littleworth
BF	7	Davida White
OF	6	Rochelle Martin
RL	5	Nina Sio-Milne
LL	4	Fiona Richards
TP	3	Geraldine Paul
HK	2	Lauren O'Reilly
LP	1	Tracy Lemon
Coach:
(New Zealand) Vicky Dombroski
