= Fritz Lee =

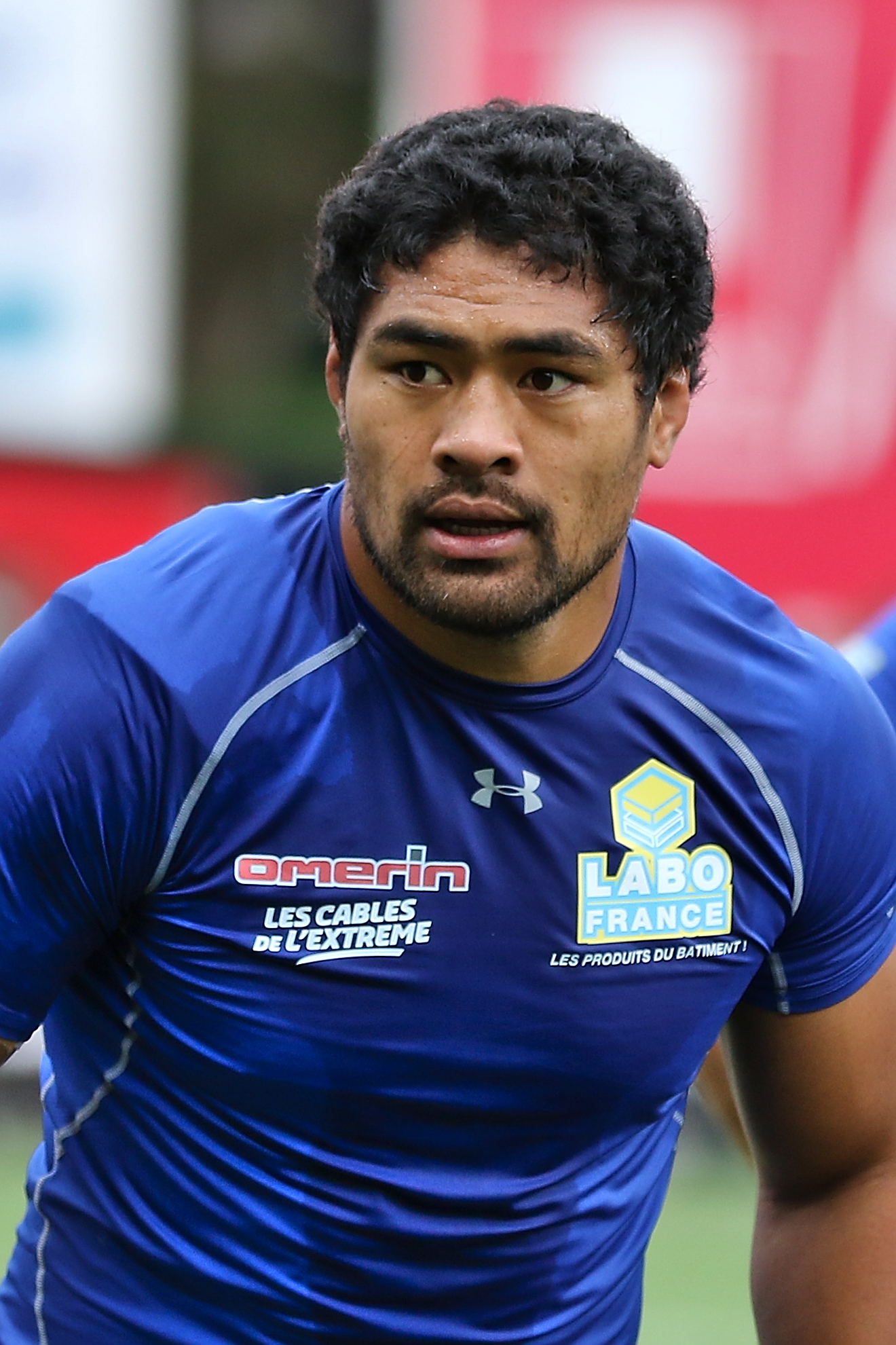
- Lee representing Clermont during the Top 14
- Born: 29 August 1988 (age 38) Motoʻotua, Samoa
- Height: 1.88 m (6 ft 2 in)
- Weight: 107 kg (236 lb; 16 st 12 lb)
- School: Tangaroa College, St Joseph’s College, Marist Brother’s School

Rugby union career
- Position(s): Number 8, Flanker
- Current team: Clermont
Senior career
Years	Team	Apps	(Points)
2007–2013	Counties Manukau	63	(65)
2011–2013	Chiefs	21	(10)
2013–	Clermont	269	(237)
- Correct as of 17 February 2025
International career
Years	Team	Apps	(Points)
2022–	Samoa	8	(5)
- Correct as of 28 August 2023
National sevens team
Years	Team		Comps
2010	New Zealand		3
- Correct as of 28 August 2023

Fritz Lee (born 29 August 1988) is a Samoan professional rugby union player who plays as a number eight for Top 14 club Clermont and the Samoa national team.

== Early life ==
Lee was born in Samoa, but left for New Zealand aged 15 to live with his uncle where he attended high school at Tangaroa College in Ōtara. Lee played in the 1st XV team (Pool 1A) alongside former Brave Blossoms Male Sa'u and former Sydney Roosters Frank-Paul Nuuausala, with the team coached by former Black Fern Davida White-Suasua and Waisake Sotutu.

== Club career ==
He played for the Counties Manukau provincial team and in the Super 14 with the Chiefs. Lee signed a three-year contract with Clermont in 2013.

== International career ==
He earned his first cap with the New Zealand Sevens in 2010.
