= Waikato Rugby Union =

Sports club

- Sport: Rugby union
- Jurisdiction: Waikato
- Abbreviation: WRU
- Founded: 1921; 105 years ago
- Affiliation: New Zealand Rugby
- Headquarters: Hamilton
- President: Allen Grainger
- Vice president: Coal Groves

Official website
- www.mooloo.co.nz
- (New Zealand)

The Waikato Rugby Union (WRU) is the official governing body of rugby union in the Waikato area in the North Island of New Zealand. Headquartered in Hamilton, WRU was founded in 1921.

Its senior representative team, nicknamed the Mooloos, competes in the National Provincial Championship and won the inaugural Air New Zealand Cup in 2006. The squad plays its home fixtures at the Waikato Stadium in Hamilton. The union's colours are red, yellow and black.

== History ==
Waikato Rugby Union was founded in 1921. The inaugural representative match played ended in a 15-all draw against Taranaki. Waikato had its first win by their third fixture when they defeated Manawatu 6–0. The first home match was played against New South Wales from Australia at the Claudelands Showground, losing 11 to 28. In 1925 the Rugby Park was opened, and in 1928 Waikato adopted their now famous colours of red, yellow and black.

== Club Rugby ==
Before the formation of provincial wide club rugby, the seven sub-unions had their own individual championships, with club rugby dating back to the 1870s.

1966 saw the first major change when the Morrinsville, Lower Waikato, Cambridge and Te Awamutu sub-unions combined for a joint two-tier championship with eight teams in first division and nine teams in second division. In this year St Pat’s (Te Awamutu) and Kereone (Morrinsville) shared the first division title and Te Akau (Lower Waikato) and Te Awamutu Old Boys finished first equal in the second division.

Then in 1967 the Hamilton, Matamata and South Waikato sub-unions joined and the first true Waikato wide draw was formed with 16 clubs in two divisions. Putaruru Athletic were the first winners of the Waikato Breweries Shield with Hamilton Old Boys runners up.

=== Club champions ===
Waikato Breweries Shield Winners
- 1967 Putaruru Athletic (1)
- 1968 Hamilton Old Boys (1)
- 1969 Frankton (1)
- 1970 Frankton (2)
- 1971 Fraser Tech (1)
- 1972 Hamilton Marist (1)
- 1973 Hamilton Old Boys (2)
- 1974 Tokoroa (1)
- 1975 Fraser Tech (2)
- 1976 Fraser Tech (3)
- 1977 Hamilton Old Boys (3)
- 1978 Melville (1)
- 1979 Hamilton Old Boys (4)
- 1980 Hamilton Marist (2)
- 1981 Melville (2)
- 1982 Hamilton Old Boys (5)
- 1983 Hamilton Marist (3)
- 1984 Hamilton Old Boys (6)
- 1985 Ngaruawahia (1)
- 1986 Ngaruawahia (2)
- 1987 Fraser Tech (4)
- 1988 Fraser Tech (5) / Hamilton Old Boys (7)
- 1989 Hamilton Old Boys (8)
- 1990 Fraser Tech (6)
- 1991 Hamilton Old Boys (9)
- 1992 Taupiri (1)
- 1993 Hamilton Old Boys (10)
- 1994 Hamilton Marist (4)
- 1995 Fraser Tech (7)
- 1996 Fraser Tech (8)
- 1997 Hamilton Old Boys (11)
- 1998 Hautapu (1)
- 1999 Hautapu (2)
- 2000 Fraser Tech (9)
- 2001 Hamilton Old Boys (12)
- 2002 Hamilton Marist (5)
- 2003 Hamilton Marist (6)
- 2004 Hamilton Old Boys (13)
- 2005 Hamilton Old Boys (14)
- 2006 Hautapu (3)
- 2007 Hautapu (4)
- 2008 Fraser Tech (10)
- 2009 Morrinsville Sports (1)
- 2010 Fraser Tech (11)
- 2011 Fraser Tech (12)
- 2012 Otorohanga (1)
- 2013 Hamilton Marist (7)
- 2014 Hamilton Marist (8)
- 2015 Hamilton Marist (9)
- 2016 Melville (3)
- 2017 Hamilton Old Boys (15)
- 2018 Hamilton Old Boys (16)
- 2019 Hautapu (5)
- 2020 Hautapu (6)
- 2021 Fraser Tech (13)
- 2022 Hamilton Old Boys (17)
- 2023 Hautapu (7)
- 2024 Hamilton Marist (10)
- 2025 Hamilton Marist (11)
- 2026 Hautapu (8)

==== Recent club finals ====
Waikato Breweries Shield

- 2026 - Hautapu 27-23 Hamilton Marist
- 2025 - Hamilton Marist 32-21 Hautapu
- 2024 - Marist 22-8 Hautapu
- 2023 - Hautapu 41-33 Marist
- 2022 - Hamilton Old Boys 27-26 Fraser Tech
- 2021 - Fraser Tech 13-10 Hautapu
- 2020 - Hautapu 37-3 Otorohanga

=== Total Titles By Club ===
Waikato Breweries Shield
Total Titles By Club
Hamilton Old Boys	17
Fraser Tech	13
Hamilton Marist	11
Hautapu	8
Melville	3
Ngaruawahia	2
Frankton	2
Putaruru Athletic	1
Tokoroa	1
Taupiri	1
Morrinsville Sports	1
Otorohanga and Te Awamatu	1

=== Women's club premiership ===
- 2026 - Hamilton Old Boys Huskies 18-12 Fraser Tech
- 2025 - Hamilton Old Boys Huskies 21-12 Otorohanga

== Provincial rugby ==
In 1954 Waikato had 11 wins and one draw from 14 matches and were tabbed the champions. The draw was in a Ranfurly Shield challenge where they drew 14 all. The country had never seen anything like this before, Christchurch was invaded by thousands of Mooloo supporters who were led by the president at the time, Horace 'Cal' Calcott. The Mooloo express captured the imagination of fans nationwide. These images were vividly remembered by many who attended.

Arthur Stone, as a nineteen year old scored the only try in Waikato's Ranfurly Shield challenge against holders Auckland in 1980. In front of a crowd of 47,000, second division Waikato won the shield as a result 7-3. Arthur Stone intercepted an Auckland pass and scored in the left hand corner. Keith Quinn, famously said "Has he got the legs? Arthur Stone. He's just having a go…now that is a great try for nineteen year-old Arthur Stone."

Waikato became the first Union to win the National Provincial Championship (NPC) when the format included semi-final and finals structure for the 1992 season. Waikato defeated Otago 40 to 5 in the final. 1993 was also very successful for Waikato; winning back the Ranfurly Shield and making it to the semi-finals of the NPC, only to be defeated by Otago.

Waikato defeated Taranaki 40 to 19 for a successful challenge for the Ranfurly Shield in 1996, and defeated Auckland 31 to 29 for the shield in 1997. That season they also made it to the semi-finals of the NPC, but were defeated by Counties Manukau 40 to 43. In 1998 they made it to the final of the NPC, in what was a rematch of the 1992 final, against Otago. Waikato lost the match 20 to 49. They made it to the semi-finals the next season, but were defeated by Wellington 17 to 38.

In 2002 Waikato made it to their first NPC final since the 1998 loss to Otago. Though they were defeated by Auckland, 28 to 40. They made it as far as the semi-finals in both the 2003 and the 2004 seasons, and were defeated by Wellington 29–30 and 16–28 respectively. Under the new Air New Zealand Cup format, Waikato became the first side to win the competition, defeating Wellington 37–31 in the final. It was the first time in fourteen years that Waikato had won the national provincial competition.

In 2007 Waikato began with wins over Manawatu, Southland and Counties Manukau before defeating North Harbour 52–7 in a Ranfurly Shield Challenge. They set a record for the biggest win from a challenger on the road. However, they lost the Ranfurly Shield a week later to Canterbury 20–33. They reached the quarter-finals, where they lost to Hawkes Bay 35–38 at McLean Park.

2008 saw the Mooloo men start slow with three losses and one draw. However, they defeated Auckland 34–13 at Waikato Stadium and wins over Counties Manukau, Otago and Taranaki saw the Mooloo men reach the quarter-finals, where they once again lost to Hawkes Bay.

Waikato began the 2009 like their previous season before defeating Counties Manukau, Hawkes Bay, Wellington, Taranaki, North Harbour, Otago and Northland to finish 6th.

In 2010 Waikato had notable wins over Auckland and Canterbury to reach the semi-finals where they won a nail-biting 38–37 victory over Auckland at Eden Park to reach the ITM Cup final for the first time since 2006. Canterbury eventually won 33–13.

Waikato were placed in the Premiership for 2011 and won seven of their ten games including wins over Canterbury (Christchurch) Wellington (Waikato Stadium) and Auckland (Waikato Stadium). Their only blight was losing to Bay of Plenty 8–36 in Rotorua and to Manawatu 20–54 in Palmerston North. They reach the ITM Cup final, but lost to Canterbury 3–12 at Waikato Stadium.

Waikato started the 2012 ITM Cup with two wins from six matches. However, they would win their last four matches, including retaining the Ranfurly Shield for the first time since 2007 with a 46–10 win over Taranaki at Yarrows Stadium. They later defended the Ranfurly Shield in their final game of the season against Hawkes Bay 28–3. This relegated Hawkes Bay to the Championship. Waikato finished fifth.

In 2013 Waikato played two Ranfurly Shield matches in Morrinsville and Ruatoria against Heartland Opposition. They defeated both Horowhenua Kapiti and East Coast before the 2013 ITM Cup season. Waikato started their Ranfurly Shield campaign with a 31–22 win over Northland. However, the following week they lost the shield to Otago 19–26. They had an impressive 42–24 win over Auckland at Waikato Stadium. They would also challenge for the shield once again in 2013 against Counties Manukau at Pukekohe. Waikato lost 25–37 to Counties Manukau. This was their first lost to Counties Manukau since 2000. Waikato would defeat Bay of Plenty and Taranaki to survive relegation and finish 5th like the previous season.

2014 was another dismal season for Waikato having record losses to Taranaki 17–46 (Waikato Stadium), Otago 7–38 (Forsyth Barr Stadium) and Auckland 19–60 (Eden Park). Their bright spot was beating Wellington in the capital for the first time since 2002 and winning other matches against North Harbour, Counties Manukau and Bay of Plenty to finish 6th and avoid relegation to the championship.

2015 was another dismal season for Waikato having lost to Tasman 20-35 (Waikato Stadium) then they beat Manawatu 28-21 (Central Energy Trust Arena) and another victory over Bay of Plenty 43-10 (Tauranga Domain) and then they lost to Auckland 28-50 (Waikato Stadium) and then they beat Southland 30-25 (Waikato Stadium) afterwards, they were blown away by a 0-41 loss to Taranaki (Yarrow Stadium), and then they lost to Canterbury 17-18 (AMI Stadium) and then they lost to Wellington 14-21 (Waikato Stadium) and then they lost to Counties Manukau 9-30 (Waikato Stadium) but they ended their season on a good note after snatching the Ranfurly Shield of Hawke's Bay (36-30), Waikato came 6th in the Premiership.

2016 was better for Waikato as they finished 5th, but they opened with a 19-24 loss to Tasman, and then they retained the Shield after beating North Harbour 26-15, they retained the Shield again after beating Manawatu 19-10, they then beat Auckland at Eden Park 35-32, and then they drew with Taranaki for the Shield 20-20, and then they had a repeat of 2015 against Counties Manukau when they lost a 26-35 match in Pukekohe, they lost the Shield to Canterbury 23-29, and then lost to Northland 27-48, they defeated Hawke's Bay 46-22 and beat Wellington 28-24.

In 2017, Waikato began with a loss to Taranaki (34-29) but struck back with a win of Counties Manukau (33-21). They got thrashed by Northland (37-7), punished by Manawatu (10-23) and struck by Wellington (10-24), rumbled by Canterbury (37-17), edged by North Harbour (11-13) and finished by Bay of Plenty (36-32). Waikato were relegated to the championship.

2018 saw Waikato start with a loss to Manawatu (24-19), edged by North Harbour (28-29) and stuffed by Auckland (35-17). But they came from behind to snatch a victory against Wellington (43-31), and had a victory that saw them steal the Ranfurly Shield from Taranaki (19-33), defended the Shield from Hawke's Bay (42-22), killed off Bay of Plenty (21-54), squashed Southland to stop them from stealing the Shield (42-11) and battled it out with Northland (28-71).

The Teams in this Division are Hautapu Rugby, Fraser Tech, Hamilton Marist, Otorohanga, Melville, Ngaruawahia, Frankton, Putaruru Athletic, Tokoroa Rugby, Taupiri Rugby, Morrinsville Sports, Te Awamatu, Matamata, Varsity,

=== Honours ===
- National Provincial Championship:'
  - Champions: 1992, 2006, 2021
  - Runners-up: 1998, 2002, 2010, 2011
  - Championship division winner: 2018
  - 2nd division winner: 1986
  - 2nd division North Island winner: 1980.
- Ranfurly Shield:
  - 1951, 1952, 1966, 1980, 1993, 1996, 1997, 2007, 2012, 2015-2016, 2018
- Ballymore Tens
  - 1997
- National 7s
  - 1995–98, 2009, 2010, 2014, 2018

=== Ranfurly Shield ===
Waikato have an extensive history with the Ranfurly Shield.

In 1932 Waikato challenged Canterbury for the Shield. The challenge was unsuccessful, with a 6-17 loss. In 1949 Waikato made another unsuccessful challenge losing 5-27 against Otago.

Waikato first won the Ranfurly shield in 1951 and have held the shield for the following periods:

- 1951–52: Waikato successfully challenged against North Auckland winning by 6-3. They held it for 6 successful defences, losing to Auckland.
- 23 August 1952 – 1 August 1953: Waikato defeated Auckland 6–3 to win back the shield. They had 6 defences before losing to Wellington.
- 27 August 1966 – 24 September 1966: Waikato defeated Auckland 16-11. They lost to Hawke's Bay 0-6 in the first defence.
- 7 September 1980 – 1 August 1981: Waikato defeated Auckland 7-3. They had 8 defences before losing 4-22 to Wellington.
- 18 September 1993 – 3 September 1994: Waikato defeated Auckland 17-6. After 5 defences they lost 26-29 to Canterbury.
- 8 September 1996 – 4 October 1996: Waikato defeated Taranaki 40-19. They lost in the first defence by 7-27 to Auckland.
- 5 October 1997 – 23 September 2000: Waikato defeated Auckland 31-29. They had 21 defences, covering almost 3 years, before losing 18-26 to Canterbury.
- 25 August 2007 – 1 September 2007: Waikato defeated North Harbour 52-7. They lost to 20-33 Canterbury in their first defence.
- 3 October 2012 – 23 August 2013: Waikato defeated Taranaki 46-10. They had 4 defences, then losing 19-26 to Otago
- 9 October 2015 – 28 September 2016: Waikato defeated Hawkes Bay 36-30. They had 6 defences, defeating Thames Valley, King Country, Wanganui, North Harbour, Manawatu and drew with Taranaki, before losing 23-29 to Canterbury.
- 9 September 2018 - 13 October 2018: Waikato beat Taranaki 33-19, then they had 2 defences, before losing 19-23 to Otago

=== International results ===
In 1930 Waikato provided 14 of the 15 players of the combination team that played Great Britain at Rugby Park. The visitors won the match 40 to 16 in front of 13,000 people. In 1937 South Africa toured New Zealand. Five Waikato players were involved in the combined side which lost 6–3 in front of a record crowd of more than 17,000. Waikato was the first provincial Union to beat a touring South African team post World War II, defeating the Springboks 14 points to 10 in 1956. Waikato defeating another large rugby nation, with a 22 – 3 victory over France in 1961.

During the 1970s Waikato defeated numerous international sides; including a two-point victory, 26 to 24, over Australia, a 13 to 7 win over Fiji and defeating France for the second time, 18 to 15. Also during the 1980s, Waikato achieved a number of notable international victories, defeating Wales, Canada and Argentina in the latter years of the decade. Waikato also completed a number of international victories during the 1990s, with wins over Canada, Australia, Western Samoa, Scotland and Italy. Waikato have also attained the scalp of the British Lions in 1993.

=== Notable players ===
==== All Blacks ====
Waikato players who have represented New Zealand:

- J M Tuck 1929
- J Leeson 1934
- J G Wynyard 1935, 36, 38
- E H Catley 1946–47, 49
- K D Arnold 1947
- W J M Conrad 1949
- A R Reid 1951–52, 56–57
- H C McLaren 1952
- I J Clarke 1953–63
- R C Hemi 1953–57, 59–60
- D B Clarke 1956–64
- E A R Pickering 1957–60
- W J Whineray 1958
- W M Birtwistle 1967
- G R Skudder 1969, 72–73
- G Kane 1974
- M B Taylor 1976, 79–80
- K M Greene 1976–77
- R G Meyers 1977–78
- G R Hines 1980
- H H Rickett 1981
- P T Koteka 1981–82
- A M Stone 1981, 83–85
- B L Morrisey 1981
- J W Boe 1981
- B W Smith 1983–84
- R W Loe 1986–92
- W D Gatland 1988–91
- J A Goldsmith 1988
- G H Purvis 1989–93
- S B Gordon 1989–91, 93
- W R Gordon 1990–91
- M J A Cooper 1992–94, 96
- J E P Mitchell 1993
- M S B Cooksley 1994–95, 97, 01
- S B McLeod 1996–98
- A R Hopa 1997
- T J Miller 1997
- R K Willis 1998–99, 02
- R J Duggan 1999
- B T Reihana 1999–2000
- M R Holah 2001–06
- M Ranby 2001
- R Randle 2001
- D W Hill 2001, 2006
- R M King 2002
- K R Lowen 2002
- K J Robinson 2002–04, 07
- B T Kelleher 2004–07
- J B Gibbes 2004–05
- S P Bates 2004
- S R Anesi 2005
- S T Lauaki 2005, 07–08
- S Sivivatu 2005–09, 2011
- J M Muliaina 2006–11
- B Leonard 2007, 2009
- S R Donald 2008–11
- R Kahui 2008,2010–11
- K O'Neill 2008
- L Messam 2008–15
- A de Malmanche 2009–10
- T N J Kerr-Barlow 2012–17
- B M Weber 2015
- D S McKenzie 2016-
- A Lienert-Brown 2016-
- A Moli 2017-
- S L Reece 2019-
- L B Jacobson 2019-
- Q P C Tupaea 2021
- S F S Taukei’aho 2021
- S U Finau 2023
- S T Stevenson 2023
- C P Ratima 2024

=== Waikato Centurions ===
These players have played 100 or more games for Waikato:

- I D Foster – 148
- G H Purvis – 147
- S B Gordon – 141
- W D Gatland – 140
- J W Boe – 136
- D I Monkley – 135
- J E P Mitchell – 134
- P J Bennett – 133
- G W J Wright – 133
- A H Strawbridge – 131
- I J Clarke – 126
- E H Catley – 124
- M J A Cooper – 124
- B A C Cowley – 112
- R J L Duggan – 111
- N M Melsom – 110
- C A J Ellis – 110
- R M Jerram – 106
- E A R Pickering – 104
- D Muir – 101
- D Phillips – 102
- D Sweeney - 100
- L Messam -104*

==== Top try scorers ====
Rank	Player	Games	Tries
1	Bruce Smith	83	70
2	John Mitchell	134	67
3	Andrew Strawbridge	131	53
4	Roger Randle	63	50
5	Bruce Reihana	81	45
6	Keith Lowen	83	44
7	Deon Muir	101	42
8	Bryce Cowley	112	40
9	Matthew Cooper	124	38
9	Warren Jennings	70	38

=== Strip ===
Prior to 1928, black and white and blue and black colours had been used. However, since 1928 they have worn the very distinctive red, yellow and black hooped jersey, with white shorts. These colours being a combination of the Hamilton (yellow and black), with Old Boys (red and black). Unlike many professional sporting teams in the modern era, Waikato have always retained the traditional design of the jersey. The main jersey/apparel sponsors are Waikato Draught, Lonestar, Gallagher and Kukri. As of 2016, apparel was being supplied by sporting firm Kukri.

=== Women's rugby ===
Waikato has a history in women's rugby, providing many players for the Black Ferns and Women's Provincial Championship over the years. The players that follow are notable women's rugby players.

- Nina Sio – (1994–95)
- Louisa Wall – (1994)
- Heidi Reader – (1994)
- Lenadeen Simpson-Brown – (1995–96)
- Vanessa Cootes – (1995-00, 2002)
- Farah Palmer – (1997)
- Regina Sheck – (1999-00, 2002–04)
- Adrienne Lili'i – (2000)
- Rhonda Kay – (2000)
- Emma Jensen – (2002–04)
- Lauren Engebretsen - (2004)
- N Evans - (2020)
- J Honiss - (2021)

=== Stadium ===
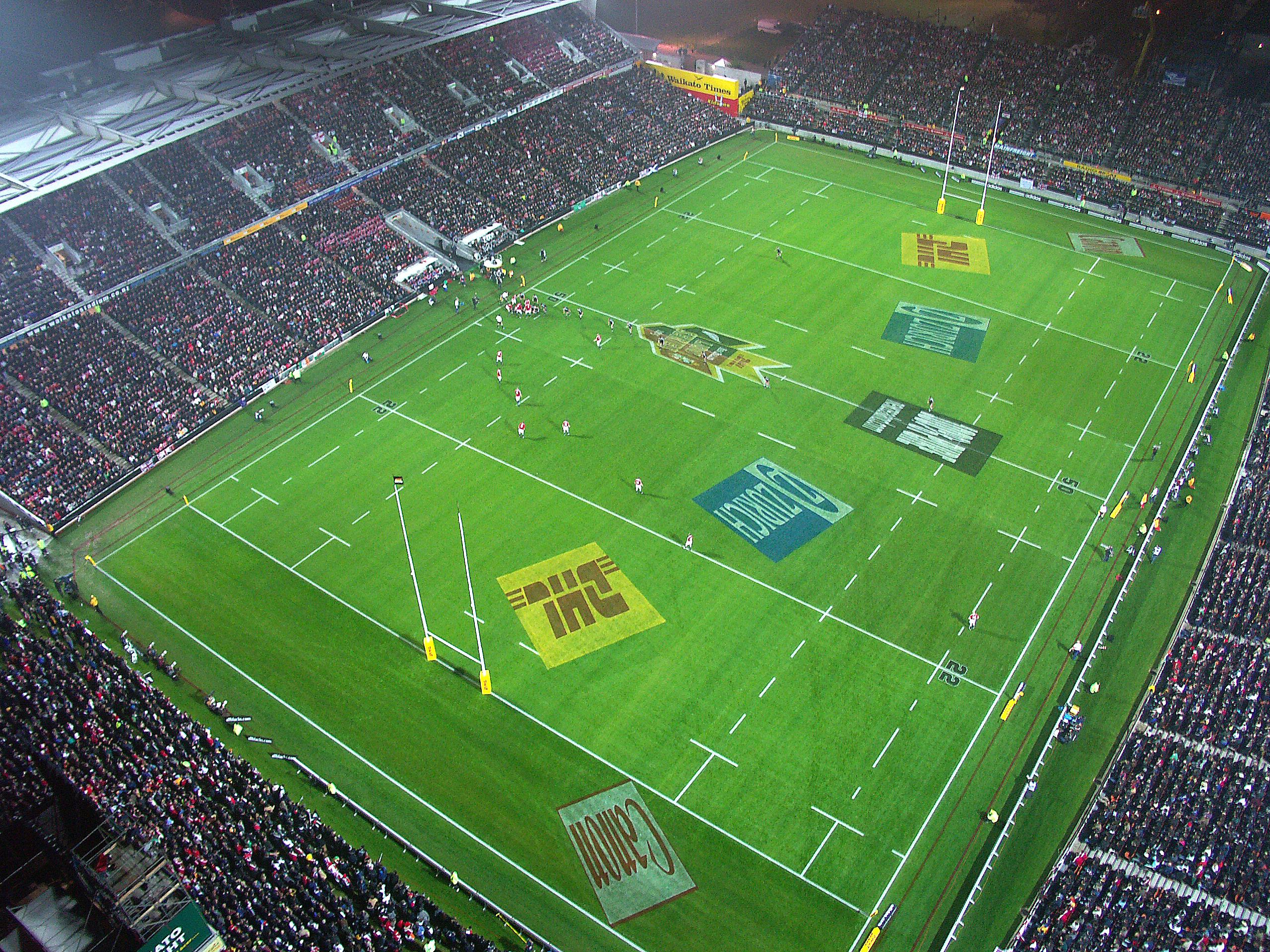
Waikato Stadium during a British and Irish Lions match in 2005

Waikato play their home games at Waikato Stadium in Hamilton, built on the site of the club's former ground, Rugby Park. Construction began on the stadium in 2000; it was completed in 2001, and opened with a game between the Chiefs and Crusaders in the then Super 12. The Chiefs also play the majority of their home games at the stadium.

Waikato played out of Rugby Park from 1925 to 2000. For the 1921 to 1924 seasons, Waikato played at the Claudelands Showgrounds and Steele Park. Waikato's first ever home match was played at the Claudelands Showgrounds against New South Wales, which Waikato lost 11 to 28. The Rugby Park grandstand roof collapsed in 1934, but no one was injured.

Waikato Stadium hosted the first ever Air New Zealand Cup final, where Waikato defeated Wellington to claim the title.

=== Supporters ===
The Waikato supporters are known for their use of cowbells at home matches. This tradition has been carried over to home matches of the Chiefs during Super Rugby home games. The Waikato mascot is a cow called Mooloo.

There is also one Waikato rugby team supporter who attends every home game and is widely known as Possum. He is situated on top of a cherry picker that looks over the entire stadium and can be seen from any angle around the ground. Every few seconds he revs his chainsaw; this can be seen as showing his passion for the Waikato rugby team or as a distraction for the opposition players.

== Super Rugby ==
When the NZRFU were initially deciding the team compositions for the Super 12 in 1995, it was decided that to have the Blues franchise encompass the North Harbour, Counties-Manukau, Northland and Auckland provincial rugby unions to be unfair. This was due to the preponderance of All Blacks (players representing New Zealand) who came from North Harbour, Counties-Manukau and Auckland at the time. Hence if the Blues were to consist of these unions, they would field an All Blacks team in all but name.

This led to North Harbour and Northland being represented by the nearest other team, the Chiefs (at the time named the Waikato Chiefs), also composed of Waikato, Bay of Plenty, and King Country. In 1999 the Chiefs ("Waikato" having been dropped from the title) boundaries were redrawn, with Northland and North Harbour moving to the Blues, and Counties-Manukau and Thames Valley coming under the Chiefs franchise. This represents the current Chiefs franchise unions.

The Chiefs share a home base and main stadium with Waikato, being Hamilton and Waikato Stadium respectively.
