= Cambridge High School, New Zealand =

State co-ed secondary (year 9–13) school in New Zealand

Cambridge High School

Location
- Swayne Road, Cambridge, Waikato, New Zealand; 37.8780°S 175.4699°E

Information
- Type: State Co-ed Secondary (Year 9–13)
- Motto: Fortiter et recte to have the strength to do the right thing
- Established: 1883 (closed 1887 between 1902)
- Ministry of Education Institution no.: 142
- Principal: Paul McAvoy
- Enrolment: 1,757 (July 2026)
- Socio-economic decile: 9Q
- Website: www.camhigh.school.nz

Cambridge High School is a state secondary school in the Waikato town of Cambridge. Cambridge High School is a co-educational state secondary school, students from the town and surrounding rural areas attend the school. The school is a large part of the Cambridge community, participating in a wide network of formal and informal relationships with other agencies and groups.

== History ==
The Education Board granted both Hamilton and Cambridge to form high schools at the same time in 1883. The Cambridge District High School opened on 2 July 1883. In the beginning, primary and high school education happened in the same room, as an initial 23 pupils did not justify having separate rooms or buildings.

== Enrolment ==
As of July 2026, Cambridge High School has roll of 1,757 students, of which 247 (14.1%) identify as Māori.

As of 2026, the school has an Equity Index of 447, placing it amongst schools whose students have below average socioeconomic barriers to achievement (roughly equivalent to deciles 6 and 7 under the former socio-economic decile system).

== Notable alumni ==
- Brian Coote – legal academic
- Albert Ellis – prospector
- Nikita Howarth – Paralympian
- Regan King – All Black (2002)
- Dick Myers – All Black (1977–78) rugby union player
- Keith Arnold - All Black (1947)
- Jake Bezzant – former political candidate for the New Zealand National Party
- Mitch Jacobson - Former Super Rugby player & Waikato Rugby Captain
- Luke Jacobson – All Black (2019–current)
- Spencer Jones - Canada national rugby union team player (2021-current)
