= 1995 Laurie O'Reilly Cup =

New Zealand	Australia
(New Zealand)	(Australia)
64	0
- Date: 22 July 1995
- Venue: Waitemata Park, Auckland
- Referee: (New Zealand) Michael J. Hoffman

The 1995 Laurie O'Reilly Cup was the second edition of the competition and was held on 22nd July at Auckland. New Zealand retained the O'Reilly Cup after defeating Australia 64–0.

== Match ==
22 July 1995
14:30 NZST (UTC+12)

New Zealand	64–0	Australia
Try: Vanessa Cootes (4); Heidi Reader (2); Louisa Wall; Helen Littleworth; Lenadeen Simpson-Brown; Rochelle Martin (2); Monique Hirovanaa; Con: Heidi Reader (2)

Waitemata Park, Waitakere City
