= Keith Arnold =

Keith Arnold may refer to:

- Keith Arnold (bishop) (1926–2021), first bishop of Warwick (1980–1990)
- Keith Arnold (cricketer) (born 1960), English cricketer
- Keith Arnold (rugby union) (1920–2006), New Zealand rugby union player
- J. Keith Arnold (born 1959), Florida politician
- Keith Arnold, candidate in the United States House of Representatives elections in Washington, 2010
