= Has Catley =

- Born: Evelyn Haswell Catley; 23 September 1915 Hamilton, New Zealand
- Died: 23 March 1975 (aged 59) Hamilton, New Zealand
- Height: 1.83 m (6 ft 0 in)
- Weight: 90 kg (200 lb)
- School: King's College
- Occupation: Farmer

Rugby union career
- Position: Hooker
Provincial / State sides
Years	Team	Apps	(Points)
1935–55	Waikato		
International career
Years	Team	Apps	(Points)
1946–49	New Zealand	7	(0)

Evelyn Haswell "Has" Catley (23 September 1915 – 23 March 1975) was a New Zealand rugby union player. A hooker, Catley represented Waikato at a provincial level, and was a member of the New Zealand national side, the All Blacks, from 1946 to 1949. He played 21 matches for the All Blacks including seven internationals. Catley went on to be co-coach and later selector of the Waikato team.
