= Rex Pickering =

- Born: Ernest Arthur Rex Pickering; 23 November 1936 Te Kūiti, New Zealand
- Died: 5 July 2016 (aged 79) Cambridge, New Zealand
- Height: 1.88 m (6 ft 2 in)
- Weight: 95 kg (209 lb)
- School: Nelson College
- Occupation: Finance manager

Rugby union career
- Position(s): Loose forward Lock
Provincial / State sides
Years	Team	Apps	(Points)
1955-65	Waikato	104	
International career
Years	Team	Apps	(Points)
1957–60	New Zealand	3	(0)

Ernest Arthur Rex Pickering (23 November 1936 – 5 July 2016) was a New Zealand rugby union player. A loose forward and lock, Pickering represented Waikato at a provincial level, and was a member of the New Zealand national side, the All Blacks, from 1957 to 1960. He played 21 matches for the All Blacks including three internationals. He was described as the Sonny Bill Williams of his time.

Pickering was educated at Nelson College from 1953 to 1954. He died in Cambridge on 5 July 2016.
