= Tangaroa College =

School in New Zealand

Location
- Haumia Way, Ōtara, Auckland, New Zealand; 36.9725°S 174.8932°E

Information
- Type: State Co-educational Secondary, years 9–13
- Motto: Waiho I Te Toka Tu Moana
- Established: 1976
- Ministry of Education Institution no.: 58
- Principal: Chris Bean
- Enrolment: 1,088 (July 2026)
- Socio-economic decile: 1A
- Website: tangaroa.school.nz

Tangaroa College is a state coeducational secondary school catering for years 9–13 in Ōtara, Auckland, New Zealand.

== Scholarships ==
On a yearly basis Tangaroa College receives 20 exclusive scholarships from the Manukau Institute of Technology.

== Facilities ==
Tangaroa College has many divisions, referred to as blocks. These blocks are;

- T-Block for technology
- W-Block for Māori
- E-Block for Social Sciences Studies
- C-Block for Art and Computing
- B-Block for English
- G-Block for PE and Health
- H-Block for Services Academy
- NRR for Drama and Employment Studies

as well as

- D-Block for Science and Mathematics

== Demographics ==
Last visited by Education Review Office (ERO) on 28 November 2016. The next review is due in three years (2019).

ERO found that a significant feature of Tangaroa College is the provision of three academies that enhance students' outcomes and opportunities for future pathways as well as Teen Parent Unit and Alternative Education Centre.

Tangaroa College had 857 students enrolled. Fifty-one percent of students were male and 49% were female. Of them, 39% identified themselves as Samoans, 17% of students identified as Cook Islanders, 2% as Asian, 18% identified as Māori, 15% Tongan, 5% as Niue, and 2% as another ethnicity.

== Notable alumni ==
- New Zealand Politician Efeso Collins.
- Former All Blacks and Rugby Sevens player Eric Rush.
- Former New Zealand Kiwis Rugby League and New Zealand Warriors and Samoa national rugby league team player prop Jerry Seuseu
- Former New Zealand Warriors player Anthony Seuseu
- Former Widnes Vikings and Kiwis halfback Aaron Heremaia
- Actor Beulah Koale
- Counties Manukau and Manu Samoa rugby player Fritz Lee
- Vodafone Warriors and Toa Samoa prop Sam Lisone
- Brave Blossom and Blues centre Male Sa'u
- South Sydney Rabbitohs and Newcastle Knights league player David Fa'alogo
- Former Sydney Roosters league player Frank-Paul Nuuausala

== Notable staff ==
Current

- Author David Riley currently teaches at Tangaroa College. Riley has written books on Pacific Island heroes and New Zealand sports personalities such as; Benji Marshall and Sonny Bill Williams.
- Former Black Fern Davida White is a former principal.
- Current Waikato Chiefs lock, Matiaha Martin is the Head for the Māori department.

Former

- Renowned New Zealand and Pacific Island artist, Ioane Ioane.
- Political Activist, John Minto.
- Former student and staff member, Bryan "Marshy" Marsh, was once the roving reporter for the Vodafone Warriors.
- Former Black Fern Annaleah Rush
- Danielle Tungane Cochrane, later Minister of Education for the Cook Islands
- Black Fern Te Kura Ngata-Aerengamate taught the Maori language and P.E.
