= Dick Myers =

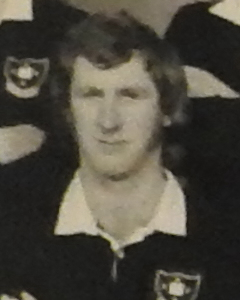
- Myers in 1973
- Born: Richard George Myers; 6 July 1950 (age 76) Hamilton, New Zealand
- Height: 1.91 m (6 ft 3 in)
- Weight: 94 kg (207 lb)
- School: Cambridge High School
- University: Massey University
- Occupation: Farmer

Rugby union career
- Position: Loose forward
Provincial / State sides
Years	Team	Apps	(Points)
1969–73	Manawatu		
1974–80	Waikato	86	
International career
Years	Team	Apps	(Points)
1977–78	New Zealand	1	(0)

Richard George Myers (born 6 July 1950) is a former New Zealand rugby union player. A loose forward, Myers played for Leamington RFC in Cambridge and is the only All Black to have played for the club. He represented Manawatu and Waikato at a provincial level, and was a member of the New Zealand national side, the All Blacks, in 1977 and 1978. He played five matches for the All Blacks including one international. On his test debut for New Zealand he played at Number 8 against the Wallabies where his opposite number Greg Cornelsen scored 4 tries in a 30–16 victory for Australia.
