= Amiria Rule =

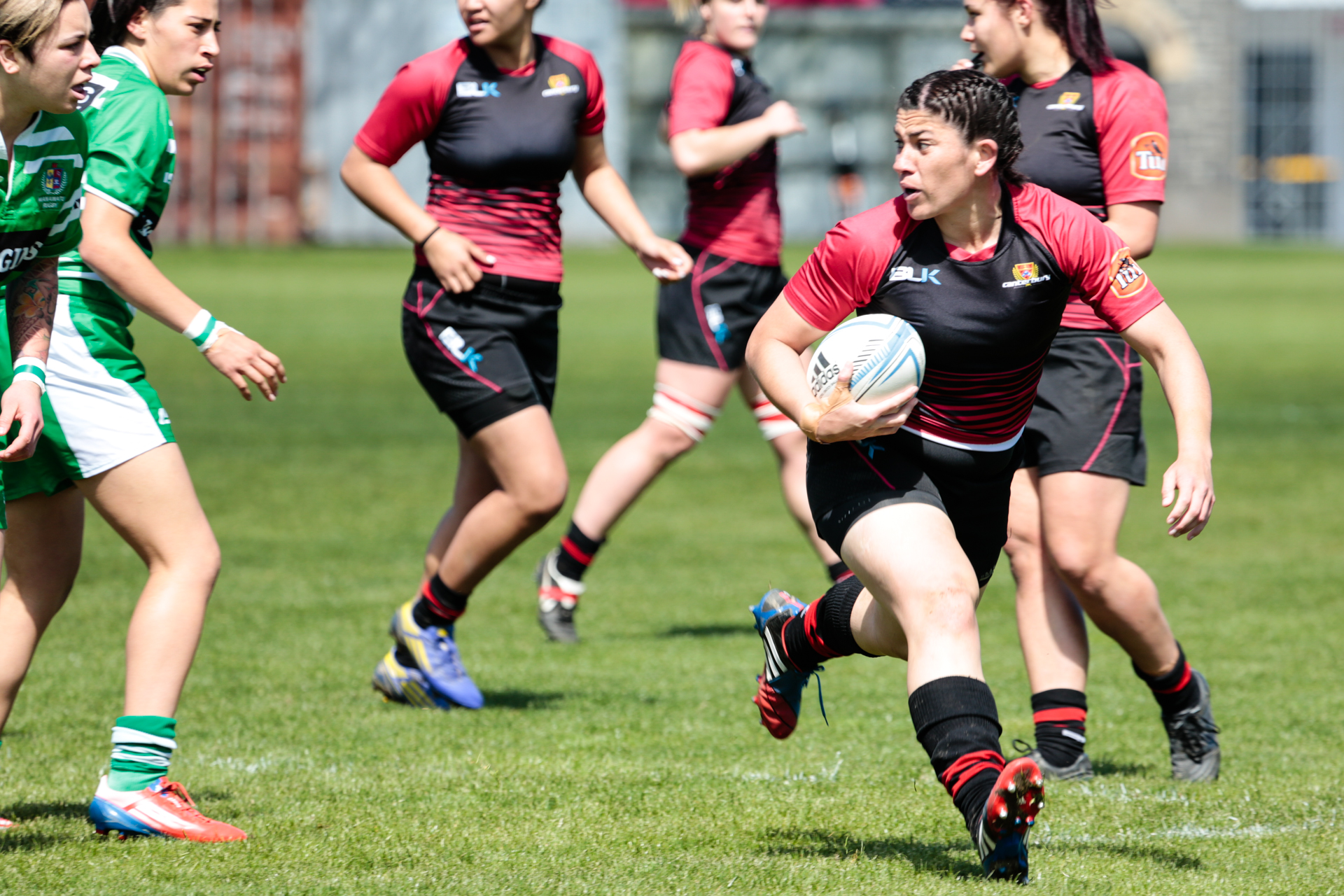
- playing for Canturbury
- Born: 17 May 1983 (age 43)
- Height: 1.74 m (5 ft 8 1/2 in)
- Weight: 92 kg (203 lb)

Rugby union career
- Position: Centre
Provincial / State sides
Years	Team	Apps	(Points)
2007–2013	Canterbury	22	(52)
International career
Years	Team	Apps	(Points)
2000–2014	New Zealand	33	(75)
Medal record
Women's rugby union
Representing New Zealand
Rugby World Cup
Gold medal – first place	2002 Spain	Team competition
Gold medal – first place	2006 Canada	Team competition

Amiria Juanita Mahanna Denelle Rule (née Marsh; born 17 May 1983) is a retired female rugby union player. She represented New Zealand and Canterbury. She was a member of the Black Ferns squad that won the 2002 and 2006 Rugby World Cup's and currently plays for Springston RFC.

== Rugby career ==
Rule was the youngest Black Fern to make her international debut at the age of 17, on 23 September 2000 against Canada at Winnipeg. She competed in her first Rugby World Cup as a member of the Black Ferns 2002 World Cup squad.

In 2006, she was named the New Zealand Women’s Player of the Year and made the Black Ferns squad for the 2006 Rugby World Cup in Canada. She missed out on the 2010 Rugby World Cup due to a knee injury.

Rule was part of the team that won the 2013 series against England. She led the Black Ferns in her only captaincy role for the 2014 Laurie O'Reilly Cup, her side won 38–3. She later made selection to the 2014 Rugby World Cup in France where the Black Ferns missed out on playing in the semifinals for the first time. She scored the final try in her sides 63–7 win over Wales in the semi-final of the 5th–8th place playoff.

== Personal life ==
Rule currently teaches at St Andrew’s College School in Christchurch.
