= Geraldine Paul =

- Born: 9 September 1965 (age 61) Whakatāne, New Zealand
- Height: 1.6 m (5 ft 3 in)
- Weight: 85 kg (187 lb)

Rugby union career
- Position(s): Prop, Loose forward
International career
Years	Team	Apps	(Points)
1989–1997	New Zealand	9	(18)

Geraldine Paul (born 9 September 1965) is a former New Zealand rugby union player. She made her debut for New Zealand against the California Grizzlies at Christchurch in 1989.

== Biography ==
Paul was selected in the Black Ferns squad for the inaugural 1991 Women's Rugby World Cup in Wales. She featured in the warm up matches against local clubs and in the World Cup itself. She played against Canada in the pool games and the semifinal loss to the United States. Three years later she was named in the Black Ferns squad that faced Australia in the first test match between the two teams.

Paul's last appearance for New Zealand was in the 67–0 trouncing of England at Burnham, New Zealand in 1997.
