= Male Sa'u =

Japan international rugby union player

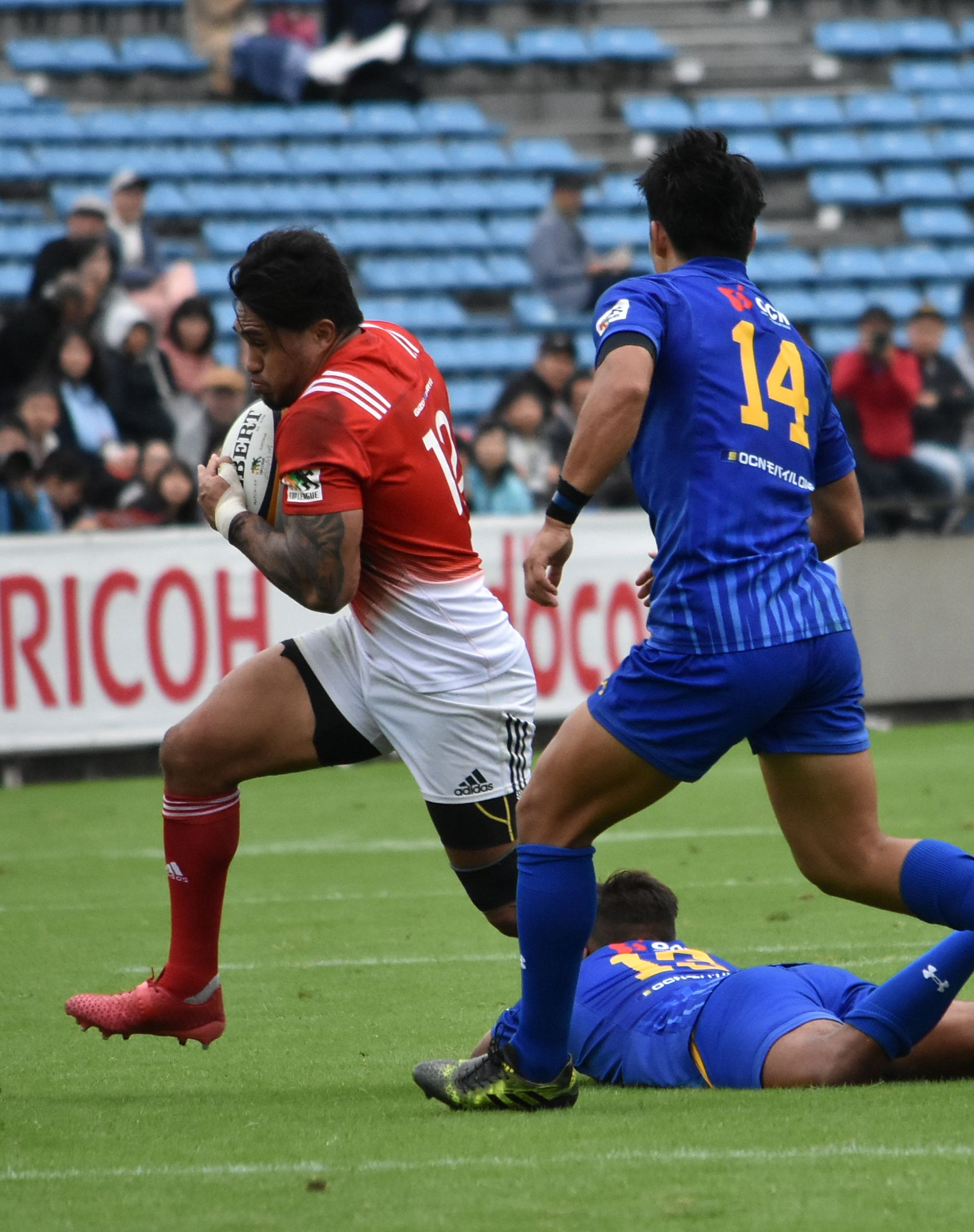
- Born: Male Sa'u; 13 October 1987 (age 39) Auckland, New Zealand
- Height: 1.83 m (6 ft 0 in)
- Weight: 98 kg (15 st 6 lb; 216 lb)
- School: Tangaroa College

Rugby union career
- Position(s): Centre, Wing, Fly-half
Amateur team(s)
Years	Team	Apps	(Points)
- Patumahoe
Senior career
Years	Team	Apps	(Points)
2006–2007	Counties Manukau	0	(0)
2010–2018	Yamaha Júbilo	116	(295)
2018–2022	Toyota Verblitz	32	(30)
- Correct as of 29 October 2022
Super Rugby
Years	Team	Apps	(Points)
2014	Rebels	8	(0)
2016	Blues	11	(0)
- Correct as of 20 July 2016
International career
Years	Team	Apps	(Points)
2006	New Zealand U19		
2007	New Zealand U21		
2013–2016	Japan	27	(40)
- Correct as of 21 February 2021

Male Sa'u (born 13 October 1987) is a Japanese professional rugby union footballer of Samoan descent. Sa'u can play both Centre and Fly-half. After Super Rugby stints with the Melbourne Rebels and the Blues, Sa'u has returned to the Top League for the 2016-2017 season with Yamaha Júbilo.

== Playing career ==
Sa'u was educated at Tangaroa College and was selected for Counties Manukau Steelers for the inaugural Air New Zealand Cup (now the Mitre 10 Cup) in 2006. Sa'u played his club rugby for the Patumahoe club. He was again selected for the 2007 season, where he played nine out of the ten matches. He played for New Zealand at under-19s level, and at under-20s level. He was also named in the under-21s Trial Squad in 2007.

He joined Japanese side Yamaha Júbilo in the Top League competition for the 2008–09 season, and played twelve time and scored 35 times in his debut season. On his departure in the 2013–14 season, he had scored 115 points over 46 matches. His form over the seasons, earned him a place in Eddie Jones Japanese 42-man squad for the 2013 Asian Five Nations. He made his debut against the Philippines on 20 April 2013.

In March 2014, Male Sa'u joined the Melbourne Rebels in the Super Rugby competition.
