= Keith Arnold (rugby union) =

- Full name: Keith Dawson Arnold
- Born: 1 March 1920 Feilding, New Zealand
- Died: 17 April 2006 (aged 86) Hamilton, New Zealand
- Height: 1.80 m (5 ft 11 in)
- Weight: 79 kg (174 lb)
- School: Cambridge High School

Rugby union career
- Position: Flanker
International career
| Years | Team | Apps | (Points) |
| 1947 | New Zealand | 2 | (3) |

Keith Dawson Arnold (1 March 1920 — 17 April 2006) was a New Zealand rugby union international.

Arnold, nicknamed "Killer", was born in Feilding and attended Cambridge High School.

A speedy flanker, Arnold played for the Hautapu club of Cambridge and took part in the 1945–46 Victory Internationals, touring Britain and France with the "Kiwis" team made up of 2nd NZEF soldiers. He was capped twice by the All Blacks on the 1947 tour of Australia and scored a try on debut in Brisbane. The following year, Arnold had the distinction of captaining Waikato. He was considered a surprise omission from the All Blacks squad for the 1949 South Africa tour.

== See also ==
- List of New Zealand national rugby union players
