= 1998 Laurie O'Reilly Cup =

Australia	New Zealand
(Australia)	(New Zealand)
3	27
- Date: 29 August 1998
- Venue: Sydney Football Stadium, Sydney
- Referee: (Australia) George Ayoub

The 1998 Laurie O'Reilly Cup was the fifth edition of the competition and was held on 29 August at Sydney. New Zealand retained the O'Reilly Cup after defeating Australia 3–27.

== Match ==
29 August 1998
14:30 AEST (UTC+10)

Australia	3–27	New Zealand
Pen: Lisa-Jane Dwan		Try: Monique Hirovanaa; Dianne Kahura; Anna Richards; Annaleah Rush; Louisa Wall; Con: Annaleah Rush

Sydney Football Stadium, Sydney
