= Lenadeen Simpson =

New Zealand rugby union player

- Born: 22 November 1964 (age 61) Rotorua, New Zealand
- Height: 1.64 m (5 ft 5 in)
- Weight: 68 kg (150 lb)

Rugby union career
- Position: Centre
Provincial / State sides
Years	Team	Apps	(Points)
	Canterbury		(0)
?–2000	Waikato		(0)
International career
Years	Team	Apps	(Points)
1994–1997	New Zealand	8	(15)

Lenadeen Simpson-Brown (born 22 November 1964) is a former New Zealand rugby union player.

== Rugby career ==
Simpson captained the Black Ferns from 1994 to 1996. She made her first Black Ferns appearance as captain on 29 August 1994 against a New South Wales side at Richmond. She led the side in her test debut against Australia on 2 September 1994 at Sydney.

She last captained the Black Ferns when they trounced France 109–0 at Edmonton; it was the final of the 1996 Canada Cup. Her final appearance for the side was on 16 August in Dunedin, it was against the Wallaroos for the 1997 Laurie O'Reilly Cup.

== Personal life ==
Fellow Black Fern, Lesley Brett, was married to her brother, former All Black, Victor Simpson. She attended Gisborne Girls' High School.
