= 2014 Laurie O'Reilly Cup =

New Zealand	Australia
(New Zealand)	(Australia)
38	3
- Date: 1 June 2014
- Venue: Rotorua International Stadium, Rotorua
- Referee: (Canada) Sherry Trumbull
- Attendance: 1,613

The 2014 Laurie O'Reilly Cup was the eighth edition of the competition and was held on 1 June at Rotorua. New Zealand retained the O'Reilly Cup after defeating Australia 38–3.

== Match ==
1 June 2014
17:40 NZST (UTC+12)

New Zealand	38–3	Australia
Try: Everitt; Hireme; Manuel; Marsh; Winiata; Con: Cocksedge; Jensen; Pen: Cocksedge (3)		Pen: Hewson

Rotorua International Stadium, Rotorua, New Zealand
Referee: Sherry Trumbull (CAN)
