= 1997 Laurie O'Reilly Cup =

New Zealand	Australia
(New Zealand)	(Australia)
40	0
- Date: 16 August 1997
- Venue: Carisbrook, Dunedin
- Referee: (New Zealand) Stephen Wood

The 1997 Laurie O'Reilly Cup was the fourth edition of the competition and was held on 16 August at Dunedin. New Zealand retained the O'Reilly Cup after defeating Australia 40–0.

== Match ==
16 August 1997
14:30 NZST (UTC+12)

New Zealand	40–0	Australia
Try: Vanessa Cootes; Anna Richards; Cheryl Waaka; Rochelle Martin; Annaleah Rush; Con: Annaleah Rush (3); Pen: Annaleah Rush (3)

Carisbrook, Dunedin
