= Helen Littleworth =

- Born: April 23, 1966 (age 60)
- Height: 1.78 m (5 ft 10 in)

Rugby union career
International career
| Years | Team | Apps | (Points) |
| 1991–1996 | New Zealand | 8 | (20) |

Helen Littleworth (born 23 April 1966) is a former New Zealand hockey and rugby union player. She captained New Zealand at the 1991 Women's Rugby World Cup.

== Background ==
Littleworth attended Wairarapa College and represented New Zealand in hockey from 1986 to 1988. She has a Diploma in Physiotherapy, a Post Graduate Diploma in Manipulative Physiotherapy and a Masters in Manipulative Physiotherapy from the University of Otago. She also has a coaching Diploma at Massey University.

In 1995, she was named University of Otago's Sportsperson of the Year.

She has been the physiotherapist for the White Ferns, the Black Ferns from 1998 to 2002, High Performance New Zealand, the New Zealand Para-athletics Olympics team at the 2016 Summer Paralympics, Athletics New Zealand from 2006 to 2012, the New Zealand Olympics Team at the 2008 and 2012 Summer Olympics, and a team physiotherapist for the Commonwealth Games in 2006 and 2010.

== Rugby career ==
=== Playing career ===
Littleworth was part of the first official Black Ferns that played a visiting California Grizzlies side on 22 July 1989 at Christchurch. She captained the Black Ferns at the 1991 Women's Rugby World Cup.

=== Coaching career ===
She formerly coached the University Women, and Otago Spirit in the Farah Palmer Cup.
