= Heidi Reader =

- Born: 7 September 1971 (age 55) Rotorua, New Zealand
- Height: 1.72 m (5 ft 8 in)
- Weight: 73 kg (161 lb)

Rugby union career
- Position: Fullback
International career
Years	Team	Apps	(Points)
1995–96	New Zealand	3	(38)

Heidi Reader (born 7 September 1971) is a former New Zealand rugby union player.

Reader only made three test appearances for New Zealand. She made her test debut against Australia on 22 July 1995 at Auckland. Her last test was in the Black Ferns 86–8 hammering of the United States at Edmonton on 11 September 1996, she scored 21 points in that match.

Reader represented Otago and the Bay of Plenty at provincial level. She was awarded her Black Ferns cap in Auckland on 11 May 2019, together with Hannah Myers and Claire Richardson.
