= Davida White =

- Born: 26 March 1967 (age 59)
- Height: 1.66 m (5 ft 5 1/2 in)
- Weight: 68 kg (150 lb; 10 st 10 lb)

Rugby union career
- Position: Flanker
Provincial / State sides
Years	Team	Apps	(Points)
1993-2000	Auckland		
International career
Years	Team	Apps	(Points)
1993-2002	New Zealand		
Coaching career
- Years: Team
- 2013-present: Counties Manukau Women's
- 2009-2012: Auckland Women's
- 2004-2008: Tangaroa College XV
- 2006: Samoa
- 2002: Auckland Women's
Medal record
Representing New Zealand
Women's rugby union
Rugby World Cup
Gold medal – first place	1998 Netherlands	Team competition

Davida White (born 26 March 1967) is a former female rugby union player. She represented New Zealand and Auckland. She was a member of the 1998 Women's Rugby World Cup winning squad. White captained Auckland to victory in the 2000 National Provincial Championship.

== Black Ferns ==
Davida White has been a New Zealand representative since 1993. She made her test debut during the Black Ferns tour to Australia in 1994. She played at the 1996 Canada Cup as well as every test at the 1998 World Cup. During the 1998 World Cup, she captained New Zealand against Spain. In 1999, a broken arm sidelined Davida White, and she was not expected to return to international rugby. However, she was selected for the 2000 Black Ferns Squad.

In a 2016 interview with Māori Television, Davida said, "We don't play anymore. When I played, we used to go for a 10K run in the morning. So, I don't have to do that anymore."

== Coaching career ==
White previously coached Auckland Women's team. She currently coaches Counties Manukau Women's squad.

White coached the Manusina Samoan team to the 2006 Women's Rugby World Cup in Canada. In 2008, she was the co-coach for the Tangaroa College First XV.

In 2016, the Counties Manukau Heat, under Davida, won the Farah Cup Tournament.

== Personal life ==
White is married to former coach, Darryl Suasua. She is of Ngāpuhi and Taranaki descent. Davida White is the former Principal of Tangaroa College in Ōtara and is currently the Principal of Rosehill College in Papakura, Auckland, New Zealand.
