= Rugby union match officials =

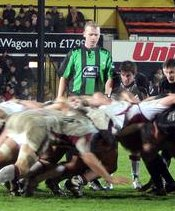
Wayne Barnes refereeing a scrum

Rugby union match officials are responsible for enforcing the laws of rugby union during a match. "Every match is under the control of match officials who consist of the referee and two touch judges or assistant referees." Further officials can be authorised depending on the level and form of the game.

== History and Traditions ==
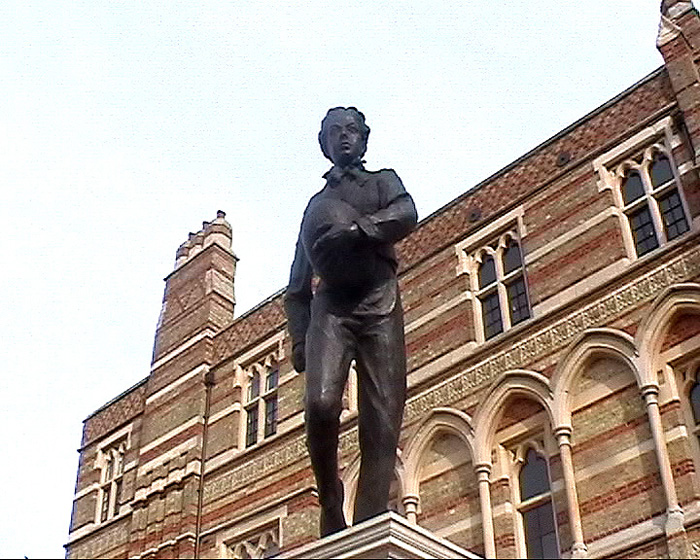
Statue of William Webb Ellis outside Rugby School, the apocryphal creator of the game

When the game of rugby union was developed at Rugby school, there were no official rugby referees, the captains from both teams would arbitrate the game together. In 1866 the "Laws of Football as Played at Rugby School" mention "umpires" but say nothing about their duties. By 1874, when the Rugby Union had taken over the duties of managing the Game, the Laws stated that "The captains of the respective sides shall be the sole arbiters of all disputes."

As the game spread and became more competitive there grew a need for independent officials. In 1875, the Laws of the Game allowed for two umpires to be appointed if desired but in the absence of such, the captains would manage the game between them. However it appears that at international level the concept of a single referee was already seen as desirable as the 1875–76 Home Nations rugby union matches were officiated by one person. In 1885 the Law first mentions the term "referee", requiring two umpires and a referee. In 1892 the Law read "In all matches a referee and two touch-judges must be appointed", finally dispensing with the concept of umpires in rugby union completely and developing the terminology for the three-person team that manages the game at the amateur level to this day.

At professional and international level since 2001, the role of touch judges has been filled by fully qualified referees and as-such they are known as "assistant referees" or "AR's"; whilst a touch judge only signals when the ball or a player has gone into touch or when a kick at goal is successful, an AR helps the referee in broader duties, including reporting foul play and offside. The same year also saw match officials become professionals in their own right and the introduction of "television match officials" or "TMO's". TMO's initially could only advise on whether a ball had been grounded in in-goal but over the years their remit has expanded significantly to include foul play identification and infringements like knock-on and offside. In 2002 the team of officials at professional and international matches was further expanded to include a "fourth official" and in some cases a "fifth official"; they operate on the sidelines controlling substitutions (4th official) and time management (5th official).

In rugby, there is a tradition of respecting referees, perhaps the most obvious demonstration of this is the fact that they are usually addressed as "Sir" (for male referees) and "Miss" or "Ma'am" (for female referees). While players worldwide use "Sir" as a form of address (proper noun), in North America it has also transitioned to "the sir" as a synonym for, or job title of, "the referee" (common noun).

- Global standard
  - "Excuse me, Sir, was that offside?"
  - "What was the referee's decision?"
- Canada and USA
  - "Excuse me, Sir, was that offside?"
  - "What was the sir's call?"

== Equipment ==
=== Compulsory equipment ===
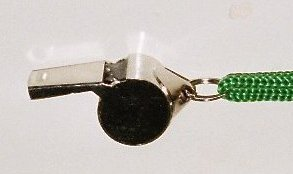
Metal whistle similar to that used by most referees

Rugby union match officials must use the following equipment:

Coin
The referee organises a coin toss with the team captains to decide who kicks off and what end each team takes initially. This has been a tradition in rugby football since at least 1845 when it was included in the game's first printed laws at Rugby School in 1845.
Whistle
Referees must carry a whistle to indicate certain occurrences in the game. The use of a whistle was first mandated by the International Rugby Board in 1892. The first use of a whistle by a referee to control a rugby game was in 1883 by Wallaroo FC official W. ('Monty') Arnold in Brisbane in Australia.
Red card
A red card is used to signal that a player is being sent from the field, or "sent off", for the rest of a match. The referee signals this by holding it aloft in the direction of the player. In international matches, a red card must be used to send a player off unlike rugby league where a player can simply be pointed to the touchline by the referee. (Red cards are not required at lower level matches but most referees carry them.)
Yellow card

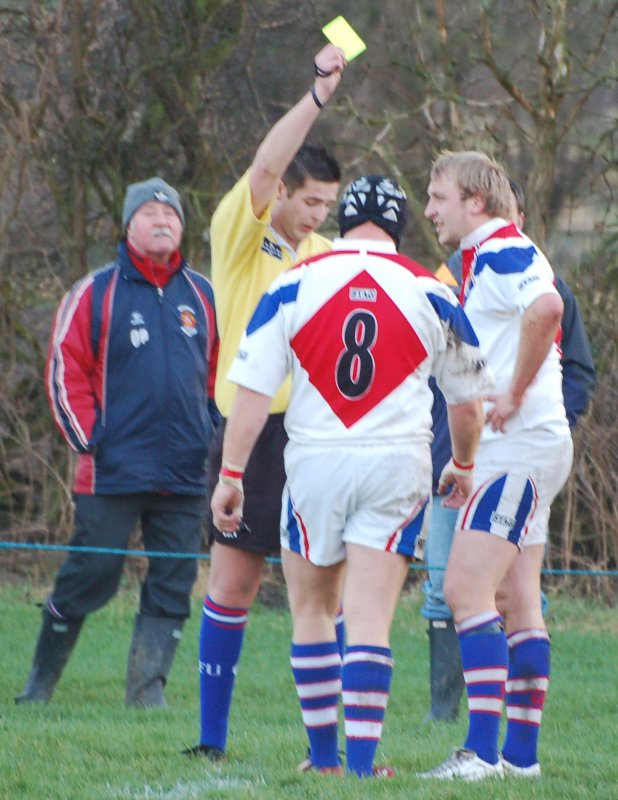
Referee giving a player a yellow card

A yellow card is used to signal that a player is being temporarily suspended from the game. The player is sent to the "sin bin" for 10 minutes, after which time they are allowed to return to carry on playing. Similarly to the red card, in international matches a yellow card must be used to temporarily suspend a player, unlike rugby league, where the referee, while facing the player being disciplined, will hold out both hands with fingers and thumbs spread to represent 10 minutes.
Flag
The touch judges or assistant referees must each carry a flag, which is used to signal certain things to the referee, players and spectators. The things that a touch judge can indicate with the flag are slightly different from that of an assistant referee. A touch judge must indicate a successful kick at goal (unlike rugby league the flag is simply kept down for an unsuccessful kick), when the ball or player holding the ball has gone out of bounds and which team is to throw in. They must also leave the flag up if the wrong team has thrown the ball in, the wrong ball is used at a quick throw, the ball has been touched by any other person than the player throwing the ball at a quick throw and if the foot or part of the foot of the player throwing in is in the field of play. Prior to today's single referee and two touch judges, in the 1870s each team provided their own umpire who carried a flag and followed the play on the field, raising the flag if they saw a rule breach, ball out of bounds, or a goal kicked.
Watch
The referee is required to have a watch or timekeeping device as the referee is solely responsible for keeping the time. In some situations such as professional games time keepers may be appointed and signal the ends of halves but referees are still required to keep the time themselves.
Score card
Referees are required to carry a scorecard as they are solely responsible for keeping the score. Once again this job is often given to others but the referee is responsible for the score and must keep it in case there is a complaint about the correctness of the score.

=== Other common equipment ===
Rugby union match officials may use the following equipment:

Uniform
Many rugby unions require referees to wear a specific uniform to make them easily identifiable and to support the relevant sponsor. These uniforms are usually picked so that they stand out from the teams playing so the ball is not passed to a referee. Uniforms usually consist of a jersey, shorts and socks. In high level games, other officials will also be required to wear a uniform.
Boots
Many rugby unions also require their referees to wear rugby boots so they can move quickly and easily around the field. Some unions do permit the use of running shoes as an alternative.
Microphone and earpiece
Communication equipment can be used to communicate between officials. This is also often used in televised games to allow viewers to hear what is happening.

== Positions and responsibilities ==
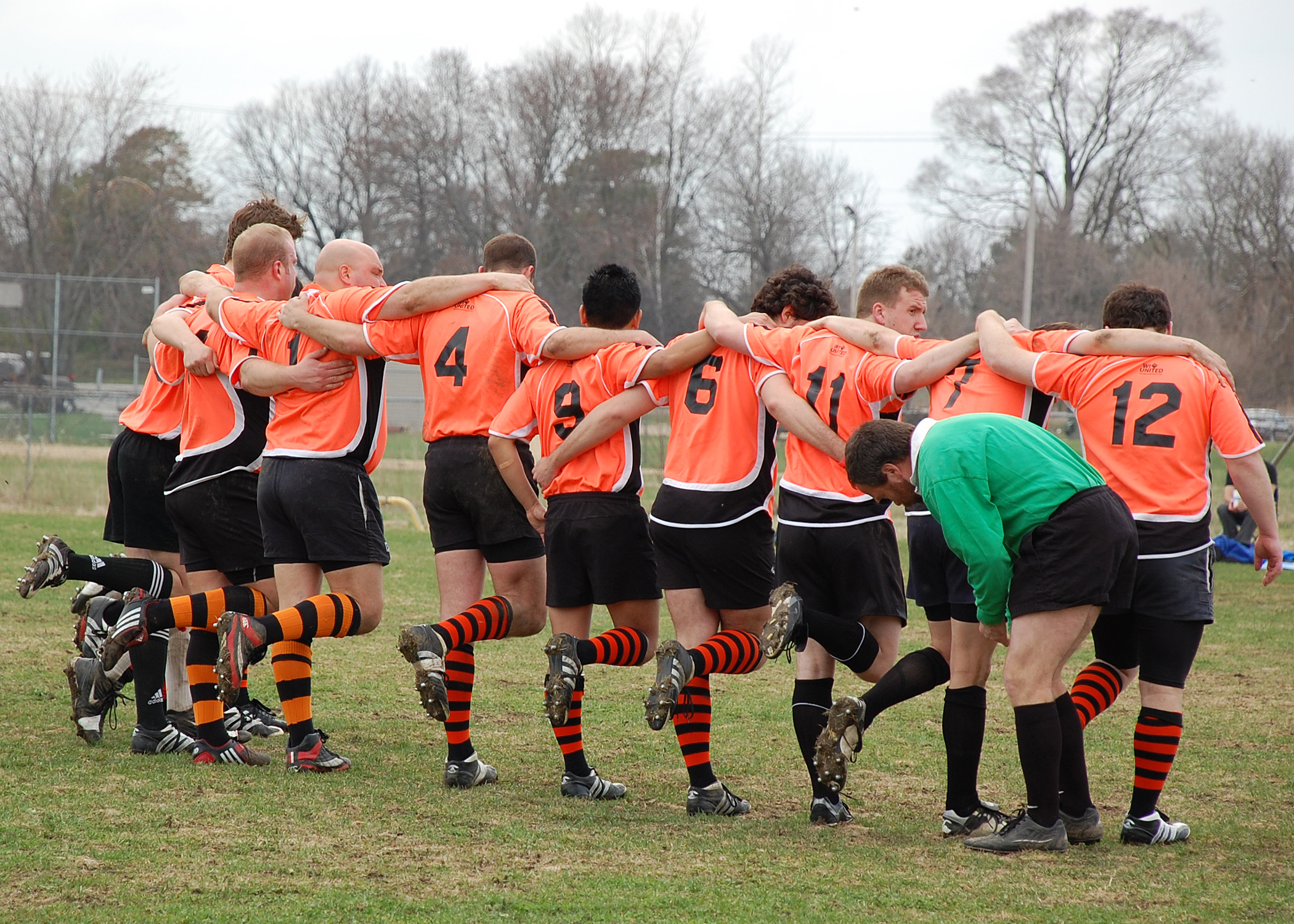
Referee checking studs

=== Referee ===
==== Pre-match ====
Before the game, a referee must:

- Check the field to ensure it is safe to play on and meets all regulations. This includes checking the flags, posts, lines and pads.
- Check the players' clothing and the studs on their boots to ensure they comply with the regulations. A referee may delegate this responsibility to an assistant referee. In some unions, this includes checking mouth guards. The introduction of the law which made mouth guards compulsory for rugby union players has led to a 43 percent drop in dental injuries in New Zealand club rugby.
- Have a discussion with the front row players of both teams to ensure they know how to perform the scrum safely and to outline the referee's calls in this area. Since the inception of this requirement, coupled with the Rugby Smart program, there has been a dramatic decline in spinal-related injuries caused by rugby. In New Zealand alone (the first to try this scheme) there has been a reduction from around four serious spinal injuries to 0.7 per 100 000 in 2005.
- Organise a toss with the two captains. A coin must be used. The team who wins the toss can choose to kick or choose a direction to play for the first half. If they choose a direction, the other team kicks off.
- Inform touch judges or assistant referees what their duties are.

==== During the match ====
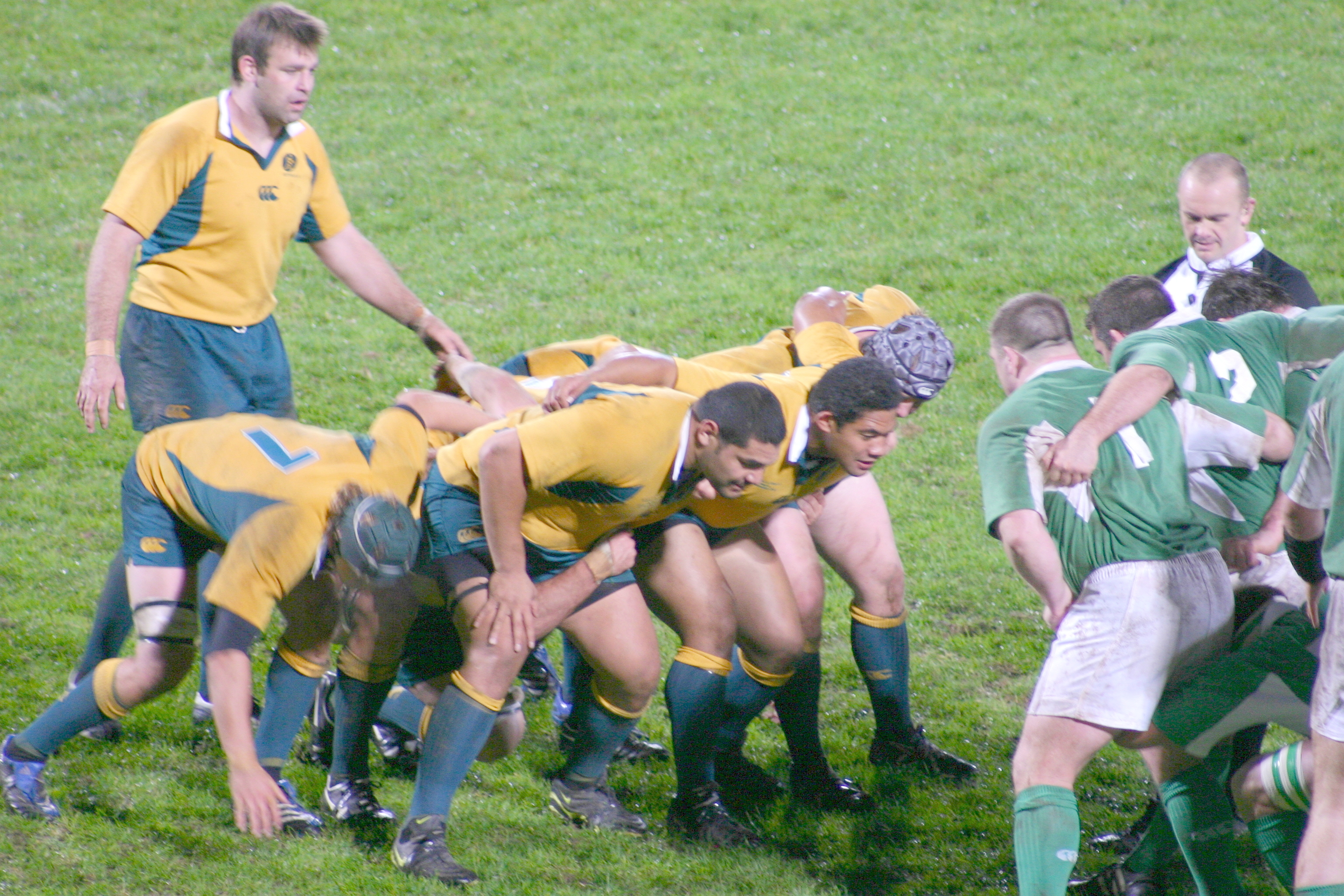
Refereeing the scrum is an important part of safety in the game

The duties of the referee during the game are:

- To be the sole judge of fact and law. The referee must apply fairly all the laws of the game in every match.
- To keep the time.
- To keep the score.
- Give permission for players to leave the playing area.
- Give permission for replacements or substitutes to enter the playing area.
- Give permission for doctors, persons or their assistants to enter the playing area, as and when permitted by the law.
- Give permission for coaches to enter the field at half time.
- Respond to touch judges or assistant referees signalling with the flag.
- Ensure safety of players by monitoring blood and injuries as well as ensuring mouth guards are worn and clothing maintains compliant with the regulations.

==== After the match ====
After the game a referee is required to:

- Communicate score to both teams and to the match organiser. This often includes signing a form with the score on it that is sent to the rugby union in charge of that fixture
- If a player has been sent off or temporarily suspended the referee must give a report to the union in charge of the fixture. (Temporary suspension is commonly not reportable at lower level games.)

==== Referee's signals ====
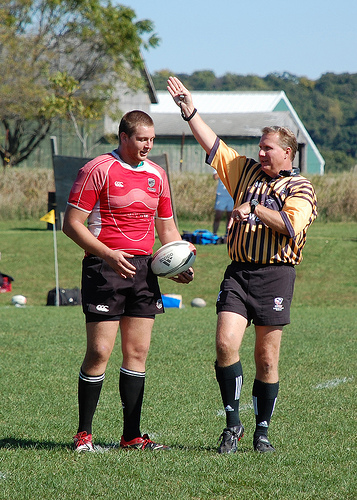
Referee awarding a penalty

The referee having made a decision is required to indicate the decision by blowing the whistle and signalling. Primary signals relate to what decision is being awarded. For example, whether a scrum or penalty is awarded. Secondary signals relate to why the decision is being awarded. For example, a knock-on (scrum) or a high tackle (penalty). There are also signals for stoppages in time, replacement and scoring to ensure everyone knows what is happening.

=== Touch judge and assistant referee ===
Assistant referees are appointed by the union in charge of the fixture. They are either themselves qualified referees or qualified assistant referees. Assistant referees may be asked to help with duties that touch judges cannot. Touch judges are normally supplied by the teams playing, one from each team.

==== Pre-match ====
- Before the match an assistant referee may be asked to check the studs and clothing of the players. A touch judge is not permitted to do this.

==== During the match ====
During the game touch judges and assistant referees must:

- Stand one on each side of the field except for kicks at goal.
- Indicate when the ball or player carrying the ball is out and what team can throw it in.
- Indicate if the ball has re-entered the playing field illegally.
- Indicate if a kick at goal has been successful. Unsuccessful kicks at goal should not be signalled as they are in rugby league by waving the flag low towards the ground.

Additional responsibilities of assistant referees:

- Must report foul play to the referee and give an opinion on the sanction for the incident.
- Rule on the scoring of a try if asked.
- Give referee information on any other aspect of the game if asked and using communication gear.
- May be asked to keep score and time. Although responsibility is still with the referee to do this.
- May be asked to control substitutions.
- The senior assistant referee can also be required to take over a game if the referee is injured and requires replacing.

==== After the match ====
A touch judge has no responsibilities after a match. The only responsibility an assistant referee has is to complete a written report to send to the referee that is then sent to the union in charge of the game. The report is only required if a player has been sent off or temporarily suspended because of their report on foul play.

==== Touch judge and assistant referees signals ====
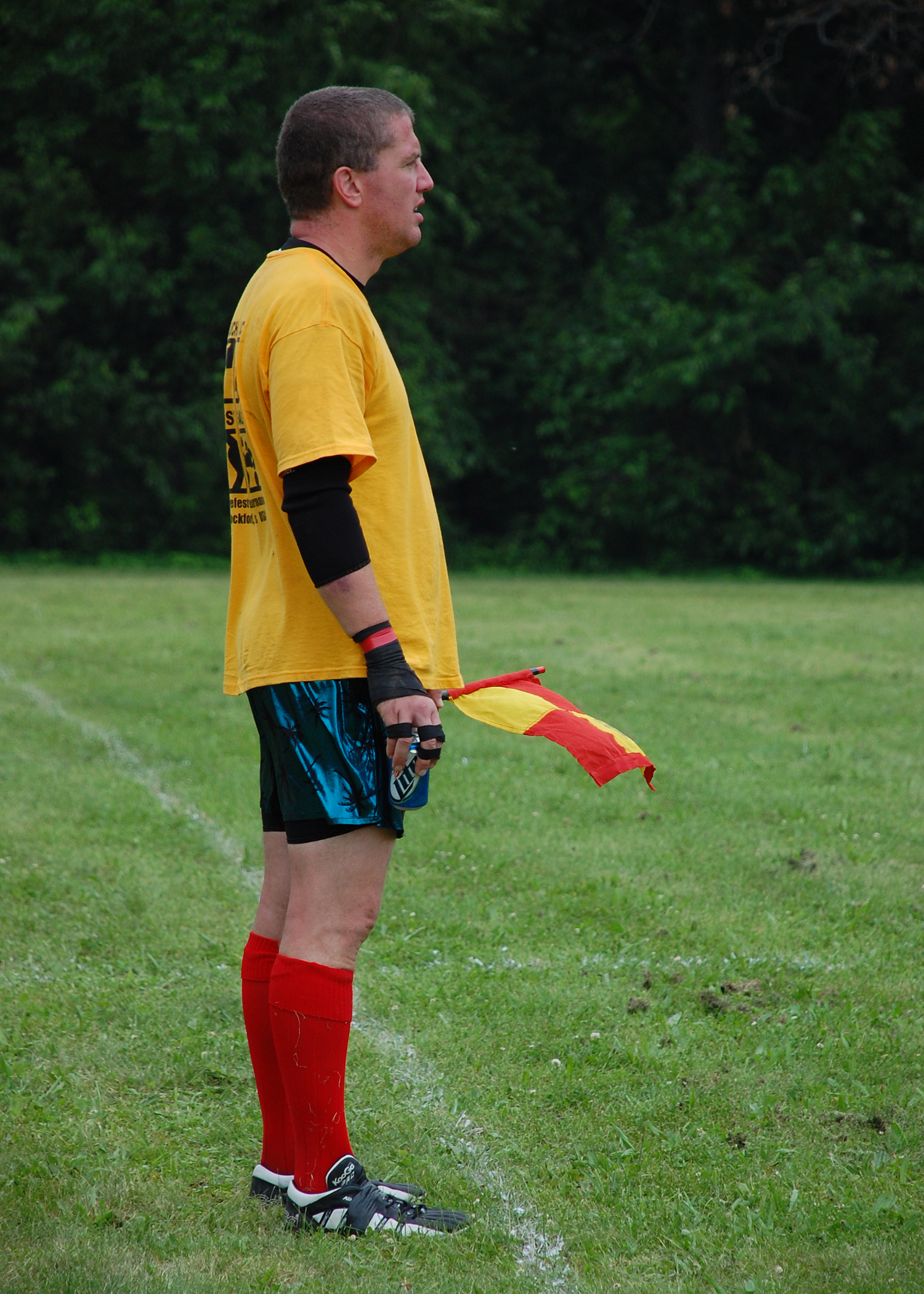
Touch judge with flag.

The touch judges and assistant referees cannot stop play, but can signal the referee to enable them to assist him.

=== Television match official (TMO) ===
Often referred to as the TMO, a television match official may be appointed to assist the referee in determining whether points have been scored or foul play has been committed. A television match official can only rule on exactly what the referee asks them; however, they can direct the referee's attention to foul play by speaking to them through an earpiece. Television match officials are commonly used in first-class and international televised games.

=== Substitution controller ===
At higher levels of rugby, some games have appointed substitution controllers (sometimes called the "fourth official" and "fifth official"). These officials liaise with the teams and ensure they only use their permitted number of substitutions. They also indicate to the referee when a substitute is ready to come on. They often use signs with the numbers of the player coming off and the player going on the field, so this is one less thing for the referee to worry about. If an assistant referee is injured then one of the substitution controllers will take the place of the assistant referee.

=== Timekeeper ===
A timekeeper may also be appointed to indicate to the referee when they believe a half should end. Ultimately, it is up to the referee to decide.

=== In-goal judge ===
In-goal judges are used in the seven-a-side variation of rugby union to assist the referee in awarding a try and signalling kicks at goal instead of the assistant referees. In-goal judges are not required in a game where a TMO is present.

== Referee assaults ==
One study found that around 6% of United Kingdom referees surveyed had been physically assaulted. A further examination of the study found that rugby union referees' fear of being assaulted was a significant factor for increased stress. The same study found that rugby referees were most concerned about being assaulted by a spectator or coach. A study by Rainey and Hardy found that it was in fact players who committed assaults on referees the most, contributing to 79% of all assaults on referees.

As a reaction to this rugby unions have begun handing out long bans and large fines to individuals who physically assault a referee, and more recently verbal assault of referees has also received severe punishments. Now the common punishment for a player punching a referee or anything similar is a lifetime ban. The laws of the game have also been changed to help this by making it compulsory for any official to report any abuse on them or another official to the union in charge of the fixture.

== Appointments ==
The Union in charge of the fixture usually appoints the match officials. The IRB International Referees Panel appoints referees for international matches. Other major competitions such as Super Rugby, Heineken Cup and age group World Cups use a similar system.

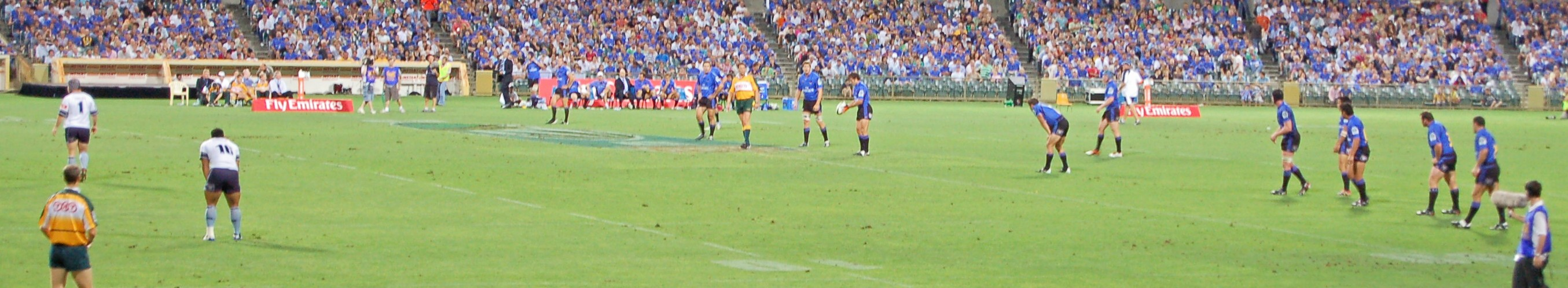
Western Force (blue) kicking off to the New South Wales Waratahs (white) in Super Rugby. The officials clearly stand out in their yellow uniforms.

== See also ==
- Rugby league match officials
- Touch match officials
