= List of Fiji women's national rugby union team matches =

The following is a list of Fiji women's national rugby union team international matches.

== Overall ==
Fiji's overall international match record against all nations, updated to 27 March 2026, is as follows:

	Games Played	Won	Drawn	Lost	Win %
Total	47	23	0	24	48.94%

== Full internationals ==
=== Legend ===
Won	Lost	Draw

=== 2006 ===
Test	Date	Opponent	F	A	Venue	Tournament
1	14 April 2006	Samoa	15	27	Teufaiva Park, Nuku’alofa	Pacific Tri-Nations
2	18 April 2006	Tonga	52	5	Teufaiva Park, Nuku’alofa	Pacific Tri-Nations

=== 2016–2019 ===
Test	Date	Opponent	F	A	Venue	Tournament
3	5 November 2016	Papua New Guinea	37	10	ANZ Stadium, Suva	OC / 2017 RWCQ
4	9 December 2016	Hong Kong	7	45	Hong Kong	2017 RWCQ
5	13 December 2016	Japan	0	55	Hong Kong	2017 RWCQ
6	16 November 2018	Tonga	53	8	Churchill Park, Lautoka	2018 OC
7	20 November 2018	Papua New Guinea	96	0	Churchill Park	2018 OC
8	24 November 2018	Samoa	43	12	Churchill Park	2018 OC
9	24 May 2019	Hong Kong	10	29	Churchill Park	2019 APC
10	1 June 2019	Samoa	12	15	Churchill Park	2019 APC
11	22 November 2019	Samoa	26	7	Churchill Park	2019 OC
12	30 November 2019	Samoa	41	13	Churchill Park	2021 RWCQ

=== 2022 ===
Test	Date	Opponent	F	A	Venue	Tournament	Ref
13	1 May 2022	Japan	14	28	Bond University, Gold Coast	Test match	
14	6 May 2022	Australia	19	36	Lang Park, Brisbane	Test match	
15	9 July 2022	Papua New Guinea	152	0	Massey Park, Papakura	2022 OC	
16	13 July 2022	Tonga	34	7	Navigation Homes Stadium, Pukekohe	2022 OC	
17	18 July 2022	Samoa	31	24	Massey Park, Papakura	2022 OC	
18	23 September 2022	Canada	7	24	HFC Bank Stadium, Suva	Test match	
19	8 October 2022	England	19	84	Eden Park, Auckland	2021 RWC	
20	16 October 2022	South Africa	21	17	Waitakere Stadium, Auckland	2021 RWC	
21	22 October 2022	France	0	44	Northland Events Centre, Whangārei	2021 RWC	

=== 2023 ===
Test	Date	Opponent	F	A	Venue	Tournament	Ref
22	20 May 2023	Australia	5	22	Sydney Football Stadium		
23	26 May 2023	Papua New Guinea	77	0	Bond University, Robina	2023 OC	
24	30 May 2023	Tonga	45	12	Bond University, Robina	2023 OC	
25	4 June 2023	Samoa	18	19	Bond University, Robina	2023 OC	
26	13 October 2023	Colombia	67	13	The Sevens Stadium, Dubai	2023 WXV 3	
27	20 October 2023	Spain	19	26	The Sevens Stadium, Dubai	2023 WXV 3	
28	27 October 2023	Kazakhstan	118	0	The Sevens Stadium, Dubai	2023 WXV 3	

=== 2024 ===
Test	Date	Opponent	F	A	Venue	Tournament	Ref
29	24 May 2024	Tonga	48	3	Sunnybank Rugby Club, Brisbane	2024 OC	
30	29 May 2024	Papua New Guinea	85	6	Sunnybank Rugby Club, Brisbane	2024 OC	
31	2 June 2024	Samoa	27	13	Sunnybank Rugby Club, Brisbane	2024 OC	
32	14 June 2024	Japan	15	24	HFC Bank Stadium, Suva		
33	20 June 2024	Japan	24	15	Churchill Park, Lautoka		
34	6 July 2024	Australia	5	64	Allianz Stadium, Sydney		
35	14 September 2024	Scotland	15	59	Hive Stadium, Edinburgh		
36	19 September 2024	Netherlands	10	12	National Rugby Center, Amsterdam		
37	28 September 2024	Hong Kong	38	3	The Sevens Stadium, Dubai	2024 WXV 3	
38	5 October 2024	Samoa	17	45	The Sevens Stadium, Dubai	2024 WXV 3	
39	12 October 2024	Spain	8	10	The Sevens Stadium, Dubai	2024 WXV 3	

=== 2025 ===
Test	Date	Opponent	PF	PA	Venue	Event
40	3 May 2025	Australia	7	43	HFC Bank Stadium, Suva	Test
41	6 June 2025	Tonga	59	5	Lawaqa Park, Sigatoka	2025 OC
42	14 June 2025	Samoa	24	20	Lawaqa Park, Sigatoka	2025 OC
43	19 July 2025	United States	31	24	Audi Field, Washington, D.C.	2025 World Cup Warm-Ups
44	23 August 2025	Canada	7	65	York Community Stadium, York	2025 World Cup
45	30 August 2025	Scotland	15	29	Salford Community Stadium, Manchester	2025 World Cup
46	6 September 2025	Wales	28	25	Sandy Park, Exeter	2025 World Cup

=== 2026 ===
Test	Date	Opponent	PF	PA	Venue	Event
47	27 March 2026	Australia	15	35	Canberra Stadium, Canberra	Test

== Other matches ==
Date	Fiji	F	A	Opponent	Venue	Tournament	Ref
8 April 1997	Fiji	19	24	United States XV	Suva		
18 November 2019	Fiji	0	53	Black Ferns Dev XV	Churchill Park, Lautoka	2019 OC	
30 November 2019	Fijiana Dev XV	40	22	Papua New Guinea	Churchill Park	2019 OC	
16 September 2022	Fiji	32	10	(New Zealand) NZ Wahine Maori	HFC Bank Stadium, Suva		
