= List of Tonga women's national rugby union team matches =

The following is a list of Tonga women's national rugby union team international matches.

== Overall ==
See Women's international rugby for information about the status of international games and match numbering

Tonga's overall international match record against all nations, updated to 10 June 2025, is as follows:

	Played	Won	Drawn	Lost	Win %
Total	18	5	0	13	27.78%

== Full internationals ==
=== Legend ===
Won	Lost	Draw

=== 2006 ===
Test	Date	Opponent	PF	PA	Venue	Tournament	Ref
1	2006-04-18	Fiji	5	52	Teufaiva Park, Nuku’alofa	Pacific Tri-Nations	
2	2006-04-22	Samoa	5	60	Teufaiva Park, Nuku’alofa	Pacific Tri-Nations	

=== 2018 ===
Test	Date	Opponent	PF	PA	Venue	Tournament	Ref
3	2018-11-16	Fiji	8	53	Churchill Park, Lautoka	2018 OC	
4	2018-11-20	Samoa	7	68	Churchill Park, Lautoka	2018 OC	
5	2018-11-24	Papua New Guinea	62	26	Churchill Park, Lautoka	2018 OC	

=== 2020s ===
Test	Date	Opponent	PF	PA	Venue	Tournament	Ref
6	2020-03-01	Papua New Guinea	36	24	Bava Park, Port Moresby	2019 OC	
7	2020-11-14	Samoa	0	40	Waitakere Stadium, Auckland	2019 OC	
8	2022-07-09	Samoa	17	25	Massey Park, Auckland	2022 OC	
9	2022-07-13	Fiji	7	34	Navigation Homes Stadium, Pukekohe	2022 OC	
10	2022-07-18	Papua New Guinea	108	7	Massey Park, Auckland	2022 OC	
11	2023-05-26	Samoa	5	69	Bond University, Robina	2023 OC	
12	2023-05-30	Fiji	12	45	Bond University, Robina	2023 OC	
13	2023-06-04	Papua New Guinea	30	22	Bond University, Robina	2023 OC	
14	2024-05-24	Fiji	3	48	Sunnybank Rugby Club, Brisbane	2024 OC	
15	2024-05-29	Samoa	7	29	Sunnybank Rugby Club, Brisbane	2024 OC	
16	2024-06-02	Papua New Guinea	39	5	Sunnybank Rugby Club, Brisbane	2024 OC	
17	2025-06-06	Fiji	5	59	Lawaqa Park, Sigatoka	2025 OC	
18	2025-06-10	Samoa	14	64	Lawaqa Park, Sigatoka	2025 OC	

== Other matches ==
Date	Tonga	F	A	Opponent	Venue	Note
29 April 2023	Tonga Womens A	10	41	Manusina XV	Mount Smart Stadium, Auckland	
