= List of Samoa women's national rugby union team matches =

The following is a list of Samoa women's national rugby union team matches.

== Full internationals ==
Won	Lost	Draw

=== 2000s ===
Test	Date	Opponent	PF	PA	Venue	Event	Ref
1	15 July 2000	Japan	10	12	Apia Park, Apia		
2	13 May 2002	Scotland	3	13	Complex Esportiu Palau Sacosta GEiEG, Girona	2002 World Cup	
3	17 May 2002	Ireland	22	0	Estadi Baldiri Aleu, Sant Boi de Llobregat	2002 World Cup	
4	20 May 2002	Kazakhstan	9	5	Estadi Baldiri Aleu, Sant Boi de Llobregat	2002 World Cup	
5	24 May 2002	Wales	17	14	Estadi Baldiri Aleu, Sant Boi de Llobregat	2002 World Cup	
6	15 October 2005	England	0	53	Mount Smart Stadium, Auckland		
7	14 April 2006	Fiji	27	15	Teufaiva Park, Nuku'alofa	Pacific Tri-Nations	
8	22 April 2006	Tonga	60	5	Teufaiva Park, Nuku'alofa	Pacific Tri-Nations	
9	31 August 2006	Kazakhstan	20	5	Ellerslie Rugby Park, Edmonton	2006 World Cup	
10	4 September 2006	New Zealand	0	50	St. Albert Rugby Park, St. Albert	2006 World Cup	
11	8 September 2006	Spain	12	14	Ellerslie Rugby Park, Edmonton	2006 World Cup	
12	12 September 2006	South Africa	43	10	St. Albert Rugby Park, St. Albert	2006 World Cup	
13	16 September 2006	Spain	5	10	Ellerslie Rugby Park, Edmonton	2006 World Cup	
14	8 August 2009	Australia	0	87	Apia Park, Apia	2010 World Cup Q	

=== 2010s ===
Test	Date	Opponent	PF	PA	Venue	Event	Ref
15	20 April 2013	Italy	22	65	Campo Central CIU, Madrid	2014 RWCQ	
16	23 April 2013	Sweden	29	0	Campo Central CIU, Madrid	2014 RWCQ	
17	27 April 2013	Netherlands	33	14	Campo Central CIU, Madrid	2014 RWCQ	
18	7 June 2014	New Zealand	12	90	Eden Park, Auckland	Test	
19	1 August 2014	England	6	65	National Rugby Centre Pitch 1, Marcoussis	2014 RWC	
20	5 August 2014	Canada	7	42	National Rugby Centre Pitch 2, Marcoussis	2014 RWC	
21	9 August 2014	Spain	5	41	National Rugby Centre Pitch 2, Marcoussis	2014 RWC	
22	13 August 2014	South Africa	24	25	National Rugby Centre Pitch 1, Marcoussis	2014 RWC	
23	17 August 2014	Kazakhstan	31	0	National Rugby Centre Pitch 1, Marcoussis	2014 RWC	
24	16 November 2018	Papua New Guinea	56	45	Churchill Park, Lautoka	2018 OC	
25	20 November 2018	Tonga	68	7	Churchill Park, Lautoka	2018 OC	
26	24 November 2018	Fiji	12	43	Churchill Park, Lautoka	2018 OC	
27	28 May 2019	Hong Kong	34	15	Churchill Park, Lautoka	2019 APC	
28	1 June 2019	Fiji	15	12	Churchill Park, Lautoka	2019 APC	
29	17 November 2019	Papua New Guinea	65	12	Churchill Park, Lautoka	2019 OC	
30	22 November 2019	Fiji	7	26	Churchill Park, Lautoka	2019 OC	
31	30 November 2019	Fiji	13	41	Churchill Park, Lautoka	2019 OC	

=== 2020s ===
Test	Date	Opponent	PF	PA	Venue	Event	Ref
32	14 November 2020	Tonga	40	0	Waitakere Stadium, Auckland	2019 OC	
33	9 July 2022	Tonga	25	17	Massey Park, Auckland	2022 OC	
34	13 July 2022	Papua New Guinea	91	0	Navigation Homes Stadium, Pukekohe	2022 OC	
35	18 July 2022	Fiji	24	31	Massey Park, Auckland	2022 OC	
36	26 May 2023	Tonga	69	5	Bond University, Gold Coast	2023 OC	
37	30 May 2023	Papua New Guinea	83	0	Bond University, Gold Coast	2023 OC	
38	4 June 2023	Fiji	19	18	Bond University, Gold Coast	2023 OC	1st Title.
39	7 October 2023	South Africa	17	17	Boland Stadium, Wellington, South Africa		
40	14 October 2023	United States	26	36	Danie Craven Stadium, Stellenbosch	2023 WXV 2	
41	21 October 2023	Japan	10	32	Athlone Stadium, Cape Town	2023 WXV 2	
42	27 October 2023	South Africa	7	33	Athlone Stadium, Cape Town	2023 WXV 2	
43	29 May 2024	Tonga	29	7	Sunnybank Rugby Club, Brisbane	2024 OC	
44	2 June 2024	Fiji	13	27	Sunnybank Rugby Club, Brisbane	2024 OC	
45	28 September 2024	Netherlands	8	8	The Sevens Stadium, Dubai	2024 WXV 3	
46	5 October 2024	Fiji	45	17	The Sevens Stadium, Dubai	2024 WXV 3	
47	11 October 2024	Madagascar	46	15	The Sevens Stadium, Dubai	2024 WXV 3	
48	10 June 2025	Tonga	64	14	Lawaqa Park, Sigatoka	2025 OC	
49	14 June 2025	Fiji	20	24	Lawaqa Park, Sigatoka	2025 OC	
50	23 August 2025	Australia	0	73	Salford Community Stadium, Manchester	2025 World Cup	
51	30 August 2025	England	3	92	Franklin's Gardens, Northampton	2025 World Cup	
52	6 September 2025	United States	0	60	York Community Stadium, York	2025 World Cup	

== Other matches ==
Date	Samoa	Score	Opponent	Venue	Note
29 April 2023	Manusina XV	41–10	Tonga Women's A	Mount Smart Stadium, Auckland	
23 September 2023	Manusina XV	12–38	(New Zealand) Black Ferns XV	Navigation Homes Stadium	
16 September 2024	Samoa	20–17	Australia A	Apia Park, Apia	
28 June 2025	Samoa	22–50	Australia A	Viking Park, Canberra	
