= List of Papua New Guinea women's national rugby union team matches =

The following is a list of Papua New Guinea women's national rugby union team international matches.

== Overall ==
See Women's international rugby for information about the status of international games and match numbering

Papua New Guinea's overall international match record against all nations, updated to 2 June 2024, is as follows:

	Played	Won	Drawn	Lost	Win %
Total	14	0	0	14	0.00%

== Full internationals ==
=== Legend ===
Won	Lost	Draw

=== 2010s ===
Test	Date	Opponent	PF	PA	Venue	Event	Ref
1	2016-11-05	Fiji	10	37	HFC Bank Stadium, Suva	Oceania Championship	
2	2018-11-16	Samoa	45	56	Churchill Park, Lautoka	Oceania Championship	
3	2018-11-20	Fiji	0	96	Churchill Park, Lautoka	Oceania Championship	
4	2018-11-24	Tonga	26	62	Churchill Park, Lautoka	Oceania Championship	
5	2019-11-17	Samoa	12	65	Churchill Park, Lautoka	Oceania Championship	

=== 2020s ===
Test	Date	Opponent	PF	PA	Venue	Event	Ref
6	2020-03-01	Tonga	24	36	Bava Park, Port Moresby	Oceania Championship	
7	2022-07-09	Fiji	0	152	Massey Park, Auckland	Oceania Championship	
8	2022-07-13	Samoa	0	91	Navigation Homes Stadium, Pukekohe	Oceania Championship	
9	2022-07-18	Tonga	7	108	Massey Park, Auckland	Oceania Championship	
10	2023-05-26	Fiji	0	77	Bond University, Robina	Oceania Championship	
11	2023-05-30	Samoa	0	83	Bond University, Robina	Oceania Championship	
12	2023-06-04	Tonga	22	30	Bond University, Robina	Oceania Championship	
13	2024-05-29	Fiji	6	85	Sunnybank Rugby Club, Brisbane	Oceania Championship	
14	2024-06-02	Tonga	5	39	Sunnybank Rugby Club, Brisbane	Oceania Championship	

== Other internationals ==
Date	PNG	Score	Opponent	Venue	Tournament
26 November 2019	Papua New Guinea	0–131	Black Ferns Development XV	Churchill Park, Lautoka	Oceania Rugby Championship
30 November 2019	Papua New Guinea	22–40	Fijiana Development XV	Churchill Park, Lautoka	Oceania Rugby Championship
