= 2025 Oceania Rugby Women's Championship =

Women's rugby union tournament

Tournament details
- Host: Fiji
- Venue: Lawaqa Park, Sigatoka
- Date: 6–14 June 2025
- Countries: Fiji; Samoa; Tonga

Final positions
- Champions: Fiji (5th title)
- Runner-up: Samoa

Tournament statistics
- Matches played: 3

The 2025 Oceania Rugby Women's Championship is the seventh edition of the tournament and will be held at Lawaqa Park in Sigatoka, Fiji from 6 to 14 June 2025. Fiji last hosted the event in 2019. Fiji, Samoa and Tonga will be competing in this year's tournament. Papua New Guinea will not be participating due to the suspension of Rugby PNG from Oceania Rugby in September 2024.

Fiji successfully defended their title after beating Samoa 24–20 in the final match.

== Table ==
Pos	Team	Pld	W	D	L	PF	PA	PD	TF	TA	TB	LB	Pts
1	Fiji	2	2	0	0	83	25	+58	15	5	2	0	10
2	Samoa	2	1	0	1	84	38	+46	14	6	2	1	7
3	Tonga	2	0	0	2	19	123	−104	3	21	0	0	0

Updated to match(es) played on 14 June 2025. Source:

== Fixtures ==
=== Round 1 ===
6 June 2025
16:00 FJT (UTC+12:00)

(1 BP) Fiji	59–5	Tonga
Try: Mereoni Nakesa 2' m Litiana Vueti 8' m Loraini Senivutu 18' m Setaita Railumu 23' m Josifini Neihamu (3) 30' m, 41' m, 55' c Ema Adivitaloga 43' m Wainikiti Vasuturaga 65' m Manuqalo Komaitai 74' c Salanieta Nabuli 80+2' m Con: Litiana Vueti (2) 56', 75'		Try: Viviena Heleni Hingano 59' m Cards: Lesieli Tai (yellow card) 80'

Lawaqa Park, Sigatoka
Referee: Hibiki Ikeda (Japan)

Team details

LP	1	Loraini Senivutu
HK	2	Bitila Tawake
TP	3	Tiana Robanakadavu
LL	4	Jade Coates
RL	5	Mereoni Nakesa
BF	6	Nunia Daunimoala
OF	7	Alfreda Fisher (c)
N8	8	Rusila Nagasau
SH	9	Setaita Railumu
FH	10	Salanieta Kinita
LW	11	Atelaite Buna
IC	12	Josifini Neihamu
OC	13	Ema Adivitaloga
RW	14	Repeka Adi Tove
FB	15	Litiana Vueti
Replacements:
HK	16	Selai Naliva
PR	17	Salanieta Nabuli
PR	18	Wainikiti Vasuturaga
LK	19	Asinate Serevi
BR	20	Manuqalo Komaitai
BK	21	Kolora Lomani
BK	22	Adi Salote Nailolo
BK	23	Michella'e Brigid Stolz
Coach:
(Wales) Ioan Cunningham

LP	1	Viviena Heleni Hingano
HK	2	Ruby Tangulu
TP	3	Katalaine Tei
LL	4	Eseta Vuki
RL	5	Catherine Lalakai
BF	6	Courtney Afeaki
OF	7	Pritney Tuiaki
N8	8	Iunaise Fakahua
SH	9	Ana Ngahe
FH	10	Briana Paea
LW	11	Lesieli Tai
IC	12	Eseta Fangaloka
OC	13	Manusiu Kei
RW	14	Tonga Tuiaki (c)
FB	15	Ofa Napa'a
Replacements:
HK	16	Seneti Kilisimasi
PR	17	Fusipala Vivili
PR	18	Pelenaise Sandys
LK	19	Palolo Fotu
FW	20	Veiongo Lamipeti
BK	21	Sinaiti Tupou
BK	22	Francis Afeaki
BK	23	Ana Pangai
Coach:
(Tonga) Fili Sau

=== Round 2 ===
10 June 2025
16:00 FJT (UTC+12:00)

(1 BP) Samoa	64–14	Tonga
Try: Taytana Pati Ah-Cheung (2) 3' c, 77' m Davina Lasini (3) 10' c, 26' m, 48' m Easter Savelio 16' c Saelua Leaula 30' c Lutia Col Aumua 54' c Penalty Try 58'; Drenna Falaniko 65' c Con: Harmony Vatau (5) 4', 11', 17', 31', 55'; Melina Grace Salale 66'		Try: Viviena Heleni Hingano 75' c Eseta Vuki 80+1' c Con: Ofa Napa'a (2) 76', 80+2'; Cards: Eseta Vuki (yellow card) 58'; Ana Pangai (yellow card) 72'

Lawaqa Park, Sigatoka
Referee: Meresiana Savenaca (Fiji)

Team details

LP	1	Ana Mamea
HK	2	Faith Nonutunu
TP	3	Tori Iosefo
LL	4	Jennifer Taylor
RL	5	Easter Savelio
BF	6	Demielle Onosemo-Tuilaepa
OF	7	Sui Tauasa-Pauaraisa (c)
N8	8	Sinead Ryder
SH	9	Saelua Leaula
FH	10	Harmony Vatau
LW	11	Michelle Curry
IC	12	Fa'asua Makisi
OC	13	Taytana Pati Ah-Cheung
RW	14	Davina Lasini
FB	15	Melina Salale
Replacements:
HK	16	Soolefai Auimatagi
PR	17	Denise Aiolupotea
PR	18	Glory Aiono-Samuelu
LK	19	Ana-Lise Sio
BR	20	Naila Fa'aiuaso-Cocker
BK	21	Fa'alua Tugaga
BK	22	Drenna Falaniko
BK	23	Lutia Col-Aumua
Coach:
(Samoa) Ramsey Tomokino

LP	1	Viviena Heleni Hingano
HK	2	Pelenaise Sandys
TP	3	Fusipala Vivili
LL	4	Eseta Vuki
RL	5	Catherine Lalakai
BF	6	Courtney Afeaki
OF	7	Pritney Tuiaki
N8	8	Iunaise Fakahua
SH	9	Sinaiti Tupou
FH	10	Ana Ngahe
LW	11	Lesieli Tai
IC	12	Tonga Tuiaki (c)
OC	13	Francis Afeaki
RW	14	Ana Pangai
FB	15	Ofa Napa'a
Replacements:
HK	16	Ruby Tangulu
PR	17	Seneti Kilisimasi
PR	18	Kalolaine Tei
FW	19	Veiongo Lamipeti
FW	20	Mele Kei
BK	21	Pauline Vailanu
BK	22	Manusiu Kei
BK	23	Briana Paea
Coach:
(Tonga) Fili Sau

=== Round 3 ===
14 June 2025
16:00 FJT (UTC+12:00)

Fiji	24–20	Samoa
Try: Bitila Tawake 4' m Josifini Neihamu 38' c Repeka Tove (2) 44' m, 69' c Con: Luisa Tisolo 39'; Salanieta Kinita 70'; Cards: Michella'e Stolz (yellow card) 23'		Try: Drenna Falaniko (2) 30' m, 54' m Linda Fiafia (2) 64' m, 75' m Cards: Taytana Pati Ah-Cheung (yellow card) 3'; Jayjay Taylor (yellow card) 72'

Lawaqa Park, Sigatoka
Referee: Hibiki Ikeda (Japan)

Team details

LP	1	Loraini Senivutu
HK	2	Bitila Tawake
TP	3	Tiana Robanakadavu
LL	4	Jade Coates
RL	5	Mereoni Nakesa
BF	6	Nunia Daunimoala
OF	7	Alfreda Fisher (c)
N8	8	Manuqalo Noame Komaitai
SH	9	Setaita Railumu
FH	10	Salanieta Kinita
LW	11	Michella’e Stolz
IC	12	Josifini Neihamu
OC	13	Ema Adivitaloga
RW	14	Repeka Tove
FB	15	Luisa Tisolo
Replacements:
HK	16	Keleni Marawa
PR	17	Lavenia Nauga-Grey
PR	18	Bulou Wainikiti Vasuturaga
LK	19	Carletta Yee
BR	20	Karalaini Naisewa
BK	21	Kolora Lomani
BK	22	Salote Nailolo
BK	23	Alowesi Nakoci
Coach:
(Wales) Ioan Cunningham

LP	1	Ana Mamea
HK	2	Lulu Leuta
TP	3	Tori Iosefo
LL	4	Easter Savelio
RL	5	Ana-Lise Sio
BF	6	Sinead Ryder
OF	7	Sailiai Pau (c)
N8	8	Utumalama Atonio
SH	9	Fa'alua Tugaga
FH	10	Harmony Vatau
LW	11	Lutia Col-Aumua
IC	12	Fa'asua Makisi
OC	13	Drenna Falaniko
RW	14	Davina Lasini
FB	15	Tatyana Pati Ah- Cheung
Replacements:
HK	16	Avau Filimaua
PR	17	Denise Aiolupotea
PR	18	Glory Aiono-Samuelu
FW	19	Jennifer Taylor
FW	20	Christabelle Onosemo-Tuilaepa
BK	21	Saelua Leaula
BK	22	Linda Fiafia
BK	23	Melina Salale
Coach:
(Samoa) Ramsey Tomokino
