= Oceania Rugby Women's Championship =

International women's rugby union competition

- Current season, competition or edition: 2026 Oceania Rugby Women's Championship
- Sport: Rugby union
- Founded: 2016; 10 years ago
- First season: 2016
- No. of teams: 3
- Countries: Fiji; Samoa; Tonga
- Most recent champion: Fiji (2026)
- Most titles: Fiji (6 titles)
- Website: oceania.rugby

Oceania Rugby Women's Championship is an international women's rugby union competition contested by women's national teams from Oceania. Fiji are the current Champions and have won the most titles with five.

== History ==
The Oceania Rugby Women's Championship was introduced in 2016, and since its inception, also serves as a Rugby World Cup and WXV qualification tournament.

Before the establishment of the Championship there were few international fixtures for women's rugby in the region which hindered its progress. Matches were restricted to occasional test matches as part of the Rugby World Cup qualification process. It was established to provide more regular and consistent international competitions for the region.

The first tournament was held in 2016 in Suva, the match was between Fiji and Papua New Guinea as a part of the Rugby World Cup 2017 qualification. The Fijiana's won and moved onto a Repechage tournament against Hong Kong and Japan.

2018 saw Samoa and Tonga join Fiji and Papua New Guinea in Lautoka. Fiji were the eventual victors.

In 2019, six teams contested the title, with development squads from Australia and New Zealand joining their Pacific neighbours in Lautoka. The Black Ferns Development XV won the 2019 Oceania Championship in Lautoka, Fiji. The 2020 Championship was cancelled due to the COVID-19 pandemic. In 2022, Fiji won the Oceania Championship and clinched their third title.

In 2023, Samoa created history in winning their first Oceania Championship title and confirmed their place for WXV 2 in the inaugural WXV tournament, Fiji as runners-up qualified for WXV 3. Fiji claimed their fourth championship in 2024 and qualified for their second World Cup in England. Fiji and Samoa also qualified for the WXV 3 tournament in Dubai.

In 2025, Fiji successfully defended their title after beating Samoa in the final match.

== Champions ==
Year	Venue	Teams	Winner	Runner-up	Third	Fourth
2016	(Fiji) Suva	2	Fiji	Papua New Guinea	—N/a	—N/a
2018	(Fiji) Lautoka	4	Fiji	Samoa	Tonga	Papua New Guinea
2019	(Fiji) Lautoka	6	Black Ferns XV	Australia A	Fiji	Samoa
2020	Not held due to the COVID-19 pandemic					
2021	Not held due to the COVID-19 pandemic					
2022	(New Zealand) Pukekohe	4	Fiji	Samoa	Tonga	Papua New Guinea
2023	(Australia) Gold Coast	4	Samoa	Fiji	Tonga	Papua New Guinea
2024	(Australia) Brisbane	4	Fiji	Samoa	Tonga	Papua New Guinea
2025	(Fiji) Sigatoka	3	Fiji	Samoa	Tonga	—N/a
2026	(Fiji) Sigatoka	3	Fiji	Samoa	Tonga	—N/a

== See also ==
- Women's Pacific Tri-Nations
- Women's international rugby
