= 2021 Rugby World Cup qualifying =

Tournament details
- Dates: 2017 – 2022
- No. of nations: 30

The qualification process for the 2021 Rugby World Cup began on 9 August 2019 with 12 teams qualifying to the tournament which was to be held in New Zealand. The 2021 Rugby World Cup was postponed by one year in March 2021 to 2022 due to the COVID-19 pandemic.

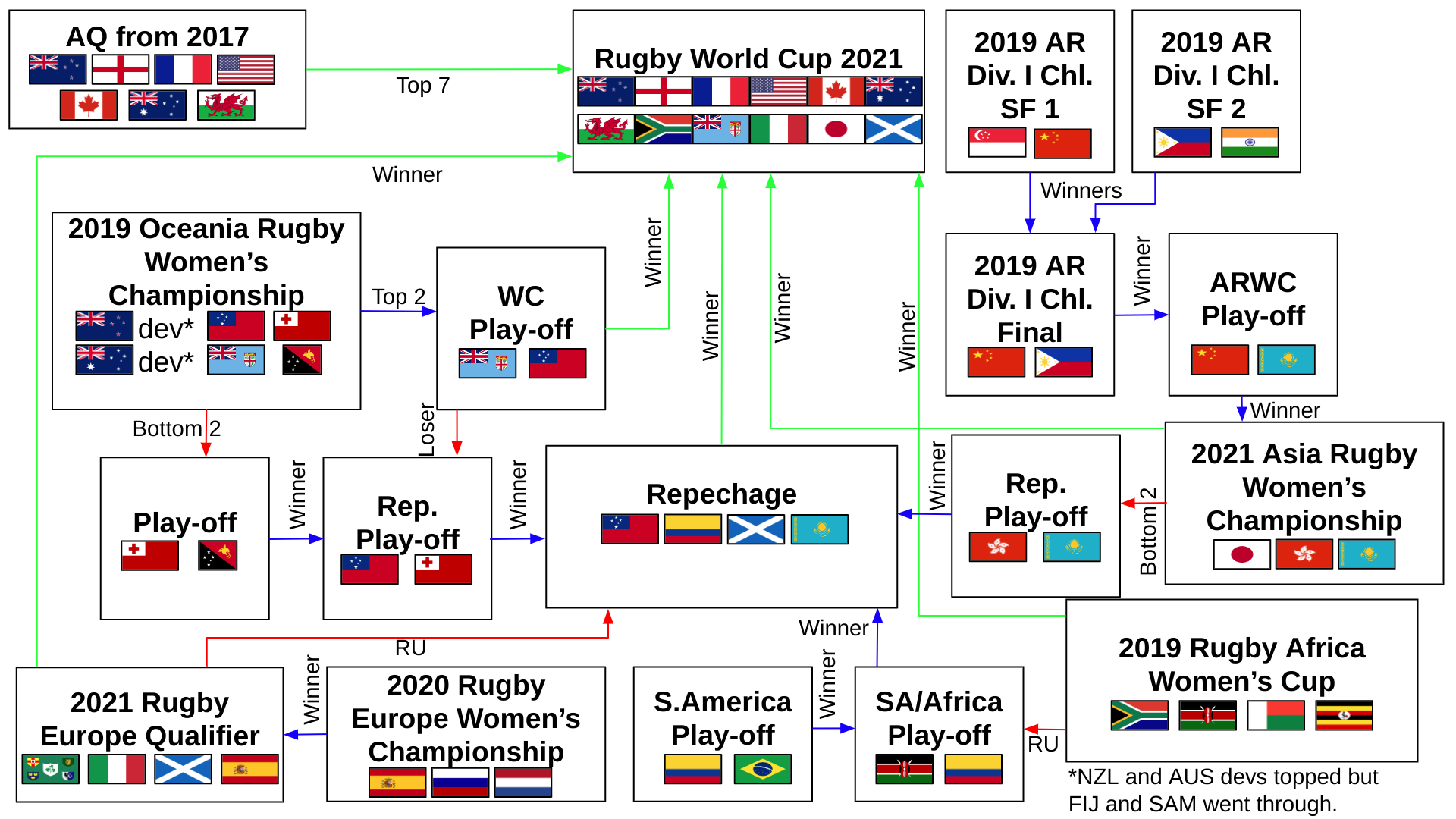
Map of qualification showing all regions

== Qualification process ==
Qualification status: Qualified for the 2021 Rugby World Cup. Failed to qualify. Withdrew or suspended.

Following the previous World Cup, seven teams received an automatic qualification berth - these berths being given to the top 7 teams (New Zealand, England, France, United States, Canada, Australia and Wales). The remaining five berths for the tournament will be awarded through regional tournaments.

The non-automatic qualification process began on 9 August 2019.

== Regional qualification ==
Twelve nations are participating in the 2021 Rugby World Cup. Seven teams qualified automatically by virtue of their performance at the previous tournament, leaving five teams to qualify through regional matches.

Region	Automatic qualifiers	Teams in qualifying process	Qualifying places	Qualified teams	World Cup pools
Africa	0	4	1	South Africa	C
Americas	2	2	0	Canada (AQ); United States (AQ)	B B
Asia	0	7	1	Japan	B
Europe	3	6	1	England (AQ); France (AQ); Italy; Wales (AQ)	C C B A
Oceania	2	4	1	Australia (AQ); Fiji; New Zealand (AQ)	A C A
Final Qualification Tournament	0	4	1	Scotland	A
TOTAL	7	23	5	-	-

== Qualification process ==
=== Africa ===
Rugby Africa was granted one spot which was awarded to the winner of the Rugby Africa Women's Cup (Africa 1). The runner-up (Africa 2) progressed to a cross-regional Final Qualification play-off against the South American winner. South Africa qualified by winning all three of their matches while Kenya competed in the South America/Africa play-off.

Qualifies as Africa 1
Advances to the South America/Africa play-off as Africa 2

Position	Nation	Games				Points			Table points
Position	Nation	Played	Won	Drawn	Lost	For	Against	Difference	Table points
1	South Africa	3	3	0	0	201	7	+194	15
2	Kenya	3	2	0	1	72	49	+23	10
3	Madagascar	3	0	1	2	20	123	-103	2
4	Uganda	3	0	1	2	27	141	-114	2

=== Americas ===
Rugby Americas North was not granted a spot to the World Cup, but Sudamérica Rugby allowed South America 1, the winner of a match between Colombia and Brazil to compete against the runner-up of the 2019 Rugby Africa Women's Cup for a place in the Final Qualification tournament.

9 March 2020	Colombia	23–19	Brazil	Medellín
		Report

Colombia moved on to the South America/Africa play-off against Kenya (Africa 2), who were runners-up of the 2019 Rugby Africa Women's Cup. The match was originally planned for 18 April, but was postponed due to the COVID-19 pandemic.

=== Asia ===
Asia Rugby was granted one spot, Asia 1, to the highest ranked team in the 2021 Asia Rugby Women's Championship (ARWC). Japan and Hong Kong, the two teams from the 2017 World Cup, were joined by the winner of the 2019 playoff for promotion to the tournament. The runner-up of the tournament progressed to the Final Qualification as Asia 2.

The winner of the 2019 Asia Division I Championship progressed to the playoff for promotion to the ARWC against Kazakhstan.

Semi-finals
19 June – Calamba
Singapore	7
China	59
19 June – Calamba
Philippines	32
India	27

Final
22 June – Calamba
China	68
Philippines	0
Third place
22 June – Calamba
Singapore	19
India	21

As winners, China faced Kazakhstan in two matches. The team with the highest aggregate score qualified for the ARWC.

31 July 2019	China	13–8	Kazakhstan	Jiujiang Stadium, Jiangxi

3 August 2019	China	0–15	Kazakhstan	Jiujiang Stadium, Jiangxi

With an aggregate score of 13–23, Kazakhstan qualified for the ARWC.

Due to the COVID-19 pandemic, the tournament was postponed several times, originally from 14 to 22 March 2020 to 8–16 May 2020, then to November 2020, then to 5–13 March 2021, then to 2–12 October 2021 and then finally cancelled altogether.

Qualifies as Asia 1
Advances to the Final Qualification Tournament as Asia 2

Position	Nation	Games				Points			Table points
Position	Nation	Played	Won	Drawn	Lost	For	Against	Difference	Table points
1	Japan	0	0	0	0	0	0	0	0
2	Kazakhstan	0	0	0	0	0	0	0	0
3	Hong Kong	0	0	0	0	0	0	0	0

Due to quarantine challenges, Japan were awarded qualification to the World Cup for being highest in the World Rankings. Hong Kong and Kazakhstan were scheduled to play a single qualification match to advance to the Final Qualification. The Asia Rugby Women's Championship did not take place; Hong Kong withdrew due to the challenges caused by the COVID-19 pandemic. Kazakhstan qualified automatically as Asia 2 for the Final Qualification Tournament.

=== Europe ===
Rugby Europe was granted one spot to the highest ranked team in a qualifying tournament (Europe 1) consisting of Six Nations sides that had not already qualified automatically from the previous World Cup, and the winner of the 2020 Rugby Europe Women's Championship. As England, France and Wales had qualified automatically, the tournament consisted of Ireland, Italy and Scotland, along with winner of the European Championship consisting of the Netherlands, Russia and Spain. The runner-up of the tournament progressed to the Final Qualification as Europe 2.

Advances to the European Qualification Tournament

Position	Nation	Games				Points			Table points
Position	Nation	Played	Won	Drawn	Lost	For	Against	Difference	Table points
1	Spain	2	2	0	0	143	7	+136	11
2	Russia	2	1	0	1	34	77	–43	4
3	Netherlands	2	0	0	2	21	114	–93	1

8 March 2020	(1 BP) Netherlands	21–27	Russia	Amsterdam

21 February 2021	(1 BP) Spain	56–7	Russia	Estadio Pedro Escartín, Guadalajara (Spain)

28 February 2021	(1 BP) Spain	87–0	Netherlands	Estadio Pedro Escartín, Guadalajara (Spain)

As winners of the Rugby Europe Women's Championship, Spain joined Ireland, Italy and Scotland in the European Qualification Tournament. It took place from the 13 to 25 September 2021in Parma, Italy

Qualifies as Europe 1
Advances to the Final Qualification tournament as Europe 2

Position	Nation	Games				Points			Table points
Position	Nation	Played	Won	Drawn	Lost	For	Against	Difference	Table points
1	Italy	3	2	0	1	79	38	+41	10
2	Scotland	3	2	0	1	60	78	–18	9
3	Ireland	3	1	0	2	40	35	+5	6
4	Spain	3	1	0	2	40	68	–28	5

13 September 2021	Scotland	13–38	Italy (1 BP)	Stadio Sergio Lanfranchi, Parma

13 September 2021	Spain	8–7	Ireland (1 BP)	Stadio Sergio Lanfranchi, Parma

19 September 2021	Italy	7–15	Ireland	Stadio Sergio Lanfranchi, Parma

19 September 2021	(1 BP) Spain	22–27	Scotland (1 BP)	Stadio Sergio Lanfranchi, Parma

25 September 2021	(1 BP) Italy	34–10	Spain	Stadio Sergio Lanfranchi, Parma

25 September 2021	(1 BP) Ireland	18–20	Scotland	Stadio Sergio Lanfranchi, Parma

=== Oceania ===
Oceania Rugby was granted one spot to the winner of the playoff of the highest ranked teams in the 2019 Oceania Rugby Women's Championship (Oceania 1) which was held in Fiji from 18 to 30 November; the loser of the playoff would play against the winner of another playoff between the lowest ranked teams to gain the right enter the Final Qualification tournament as Oceania 2. Six teams competed in the competition with Australia and New Zealand each sending a development team to the tournament. The six teams were separated into two groups with New Zealand A joining Samoa and Tonga in Pool A while Australia A, Fiji and Papua New Guinea went into Pool B. A split pool format was used whereby each team was scheduled to play three matches, but only against teams in the opposite pool.

Advances to the World Cup play-off

==== Pool A ====
Position	Nation	Games				Points			Table points
Position	Nation	Played	Won	Drawn	Lost	For	Against	Difference	Table points
1	Black Ferns Dev. XV	3	3	0	0	234	0	+234	15
2	Samoa	3	1	0	2	77	65	+12	5
3	Tonga^{a}	1	0	1	0	0	0	0	2

==== Pool B ====
Position	Nation	Games				Points			Table points
Position	Nation	Played	Won	Drawn	Lost	For	Against	Difference	Table points
1	Australia A	3	1	1	1	27	55	-28	7
2	Fiji	2	1	0	1	26	60	-34	5
3	Papua New Guinea	2	0	0	2	12	196	-184	0

^^{a} Tonga withdrew from the competition shortly before their first game with Australia A due to the measles outbreak in Tonga. The match was declared a 0–0 draw.

As New Zealand and Australia had already qualified for the World Cup, Samoa and Fiji met in the playoff match with the winner gaining qualification to the World Cup and the loser to play against the winner of a match between Tonga and Papua New Guinea to earn a place in the Final Qualification tournament.

30 November 2019	Fiji	41–13	Samoa	Churchill Park, Lautoka
		Report

As a result, Fiji qualified for the World Cup, while Samoa awaited the winner of Tonga and Papua New Guinea.

1 March 2020	Papua New Guinea	24–36	Tonga	Bava Park, Port Moresby
		Report

Tonga played Samoa to determine who advanced to the tournament.

14 November 2020	Samoa	40–0	Tonga	The Trusts Arena, Auckland

As a result, Samoa became the first team to qualify for the Final Qualification tournament.

=== South America/Africa play-off ===
A play-off between Africa 2 (the runner-up of the 2019 Rugby Africa Women's Cup) and South America 1 (the winner of the South America play-off between Colombia and Brazil) was played for a place in the Final Qualification. Kenya finished in second in the RAWC, and Colombia defeated Brazil. The match was scheduled for 18 April 2020 but was postponed to 25 August 2021 due to the COVID-19 pandemic.

25 August 2021	Kenya	15–16	Colombia	Nyayo National Stadium, Nairobi

As a result, Colombia qualified for the Final Qualification tournament.

== Final Qualification Tournament ==
The final team to qualify for the 2021 Rugby World Cup was decided via a Final Qualification tournament. Four teams competed in the tournament: the second placed teams from the regional tournaments of Asia (Asia 2) and Europe (Europe 2), the winner of the play-off between the loser of the Oceania World Cup qualifying play-off and the winner of another play-off between the bottom ranked teams in the same tournament (Oceania 2), and the winner of the South America/Africa play-off. Samoa withdrew from the Final Qualification Tournament due to challenges caused by the ongoing COVID-19 pandemic. As the two bottom ranked teams, Kazakhstan and Colombia played a semi-final match on 19 February 2022. Colombia defeated Kazakhstan and played Scotland in the final on 25 February 2022.

Scotland claimed the final spot in the 2021 Rugby World Cup by defeating Colombia 59 points to 3.

=== Semi-final ===
19 February 2022	Kazakhstan	10–18	Colombia	The Sevens Stadium, Dubai
		Report

=== Final ===
25 February 2022	Scotland	59–3	Colombia	The Sevens Stadium, Dubai
