= Sui Tauaua-Pauaraisa =

Samoa international rugby league and rugby sevens footballer

Personal information
- Full name: Masuisuimatamaalii Tauaua-Pauaraisa
- Born: 30 October 1987 (age 39) Motoʻotua, Samoa
- Height: 165 cm (5 ft 5 in)
- Weight: 70 kg (11 st 0 lb)

Playing information
- Position: Lock, Second-row
Club
Years	Team	Pld	T	G	FG	P
2018	New Zealand Warriors	3	0	0	0	0
Representative
Years	Team	Pld	T	G	FG	P
2018	New Zealand	1	0	0	0	0
2019	Samoa	1	0	0	0	0
- Source: RLP As of 24 November 2020

Rugby union career
- Position: Back row
Provincial / State sides
Years	Team	Apps	(Points)
2015–2017	Canterbury	17	(5)
2021–2024	Tasman	22	(25)
International career
Years	Team	Apps	(Points)
2018–	Samoa	30	(30)
National sevens team
Years	Team		Comps
2019	Samoa		

Masuisuimatamaalii "Sua" Tauaua-Pauaraisa (born 30 October 1987) is a Samoan rugby league and rugby sevens footballer who played for the New Zealand Warriors in the NRL Women's Premiership.

She is a New Zealand and Samoa representative in rugby league and a Samoa representative in rugby union and sevens.

== Early life and career ==
Born in Motoʻotua, Samoa, Tauaua-Pauaraisa moved to Auckland when she was 13, where she played rugby union for McAuley High School, Otahuhu, Auckland. In 2010, she moved to Christchurch.

== Playing career ==
=== Rugby league ===
In 2016, she began playing rugby league for the Linwood Keas. On 4 June 2018, Tauaua-Pauaraisa was named in the New Zealand train-on squad.

On 31 July 2018, she signed with the New Zealand Warriors NRL Women's Premiership team. In Round 1 of the 2018 NRL Women's season, she made her debut for the Warriors in a 10–4 win over the Sydney Roosters.

On 13 October 2018, she made her Test debut for New Zealand in a 24–26 loss to Australia at Mt Smart Stadium.

On 22 June 2019, Tauaua-Pauaraisa made her Test debut for Samoa, starting at second-row in a 8–46 loss to New Zealand.

=== Rugby union ===
Tauaua-Pauaraisa led the Manusina XVs side at the Oceania Rugby Championship in 2018.

Tauaua-Pauaraisa played for Canterbury in the Farah Palmer Cup. She competed at the Vailima Marist International Sevens in Samoa with the Christchurch Women's Rugby team in 2019. In 2021, she was named Tasman Mako FPC Player of the Year.

She led the Manusina side when they won their first Oceania title in 2023. In 2024, she made her fifth start for the Melbourne Rebels in the Super Rugby Women's competition.

In May 2024, she scored two tries for her side before being sent off the field against Tonga. She was cleared to play for Samoa in the final round of the Oceania Rugby Championship after she was initially cited for a high tackle in the match against Tonga. In September, she was selected in the Samoan side that competed at the WXV 3 competition in Dubai.

She captained the Manusina side to the 2025 Women's Rugby World Cup in England.

=== Rugby sevens ===
In July 2019, she captained the Samoa rugby sevens team at the 2019 Pacific Games.
