= 2023 Oceania Rugby Women's Championship =

2023 Oceania Women's Championship
Tournament details
- Host: Australia
- Venue: Bond University, Gold Coast
- Date: 26 May 2023–4 June 2023
- Teams: 4

Final positions
- Champions: Samoa (1st title)
- Runner-up: Fiji

Tournament statistics
- Matches played: 6

The 2023 Oceania Rugby Women's Championship was the fifth edition of the Oceania Rugby Women's Championship. The competition was held at Bond University in Gold Coast, Queensland between 26 May and 4 June. The 2023 competition saw teams compete for two spots in World Rugby's inaugural WXV competition that will commence later in the year. The tournament was played in a round-robin format with each team playing three games each.

Samoa won their first Oceania Championship title and confirmed their place for WXV 2, Fiji as runners-up have qualified for WXV 3.

== Table ==
Legend
Qualifies for WXV 2
Qualifies for WXV 3

Pos	Team	P	W	D	L	PF	PA	PD
1	Samoa	3	3	0	0	171	23	148
2	Fiji	3	2	0	1	140	31	109
3	Tonga	3	1	0	2	47	136	–89
4	Papua New Guinea	3	0	0	3	22	190	–168

== Tournament ==
=== Round 1 ===
26 May 2023	Papua New Guinea	0–77	Fiji (1BP)	Bond University, Gold Coast
17:30 AEST (UTC+10)			Try: Keleni Marawa 11' m Ana Maria Naimasi (2) 16' c, 18' m Reapi Ulunisau (4) 30' c, 41' m, 47' m, 53' c Ana Korovata 37' c Fulori Nabura 51' c Sulita Waisega (2) 70' c, 80+2' m Raijieli Daveua 80' m Bitila Tawake 80+2' m Con: Luisa Tisolo (5) 17', 31', 37', 52', 54'; Wainikiti Vosadrau 71'; Cards: Ana Maria Naimasi (yellow card) 33' to 43'	Referee: Ella Goldsmith (AUS)

26 May 2023	(1BP) Samoa	69–5	Tonga	Bond University, Gold Coast
19:30 AEST (UTC+10)	Try: Utumalama Atonio (2) 1' c, 21' c Jacqui Aiono 10' c Linda Fiafia 18' m Hasting Leiataua (2) 28' c, 39' m Makayla Eli 36' c Cassie Siataga 40' c Easter Savelio 52' m Nina Foaese 61' m Rereglory Aiono 66' c Con: Cassie Siataga (7) 2', 11', 22', 29', 37', 40', 80+2'		Try: Seneti Kilisimasi 42' m	Referee: Lavenia Racaca (FRU)

=== Round 2 ===
30 May 2023	(1BP) Samoa	83–0	Papua New Guinea	Bond University, Gold Coast
17:30 AEST (UTC+10)	Try: Utumalama Atonio 11' m Hasting Leiataua (2) 19' c, 40' c Michelle Curry (2) 23' m, 33' c Makayla Eli 28' c Mollie Tagaloa 37' c Ana Mamea 42' c Nina Foaese 45' m Alyce Solaese 54' c Lulu Leuta 60' c Sui Pauaraisa 69' m Bella Milo 73' c Con: Cassie Siataga (7) 20', 30', 34', 38', 41', 43', 55'; Makayla Eli (2) 61', 74'		Cards: Regila Wilfred (yellow card) 10' to 20'; Joana Lagona (yellow card) 60' to 70'	Referee: Lavenia Racaca (FRU)

30 May 2023	(1BP) Fiji	45–12	Tonga	Bond University, Gold Coast
19:30 AEST (UTC+10)	Try: Vani Arei 3' c Raijieli Daveua (2) 8' c, 72' c Ana Maria Naimasi (3) 21' c, 60' m, 76' c Luisa Tisolo 43' m Con: Luisa Tisolo (5) 4', 9', 22', 72', 76'		Try: Sokopeti Jessica Akauola 33' c Loketi Serenity Mahoni 55' m Con: Shonte Toa 34'	Referee: Ella Goldsmith (AUS)

=== Round 3 ===
4 June 2023	Papua New Guinea	22–30	Tonga (1BP)	Bond University, Gold Coast
14:00 AEST (UTC+10)	Try: Joana Lagona 9' c Brenda Waiye Goro 45' c Marie Biyama 74' m Con: Gemma Schnaubelt (2) 10', 46'; Pen: Gemma Schnaubelt 67'		Try: Siutiti Maake (2) 5' m, 28' c Lu'isa Sikata Pita 18' m Moniqca Mo'ale 51' c Con: Shonte Toa (2) 29', 52'; Pen: Shonte Toa (2) 70', 78'; Cards: Seneti Kilisimasi (yellow card) 42' to 52'; Leonia Tauelangi (red card) 67'	Referee: Lavenia Racaca (FRU)

4 June 2023	(1BP) Fiji	18–19	Samoa	Bond University, Gold Coast
16:00 AEST (UTC+10)	Try: Vani Arei 30' m Siteri Rasolea 48' m Adita Milinia 77' m Pen: Luisa Tisolo 39'		Try: Cassie Siataga 43' c Con: Cassie Siataga 44'; Pen: Cassie Siataga (4) 18', 62', 70', 80'	Referee: Ella Goldsmith (AUS)

== Squads ==
=== Fiji ===
Fijiana's 29-member squad for the Oceania Championship.

Player	Position	Caps	Club/Province
Adita Milinia			Fijiana Drua
Ana Korovata	Prop	1	Fijiana Drua
Ana Naimasi		1	Fijiana Sevens
Asinate Serevi	Lock	3	Fijiana Drua
Bitila Tawake	Prop	6	Fijiana Drua
Bulou Vasuturaga	Lock		
Doreen Narokete	Lock		Fijiana Drua
Evivi Senikarivi	Scrumhalf		Fijiana Drua
Fulori Nabura	Back Row		
Iris Verebalavu	Prop	1	ACT Brumbies
Jade Coates	Back Row		Fijiana Drua
Jennifer Ravutia	Fly-Half	1	Fijiana Drua
Karalaini Naisewa	Back Row	7	Fijiana Drua
Keleni Marawa	Hooker		Fijiana Drua
Kolora Lomani	Wing	5	Fijiana Drua
Litia Marama	Hooker		Fijiana Drua
Luisa Tisolo	Fullback		
Mereoni Nakesa	Lock	1	Fijiana Drua
Merewai Cumu (vc)	Centre		Fijiana Drua
Raijeli Daveua			Fijiana Sevens
Raijieli Laqeretabua	Wing	6	Fijiana Drua
Reapi Ulunisau		uncapped	Fijiana Sevens
Sera Ravatudei			Western Force
Sereima Leweniqila (c)	Back Row	9	Fijiana Drua
Setaita Railumu		1	Fijiana Drua
Siteri Rasolea	Prop	1	Fijiana Drua
Sulita Waisega	Back Row	4	Fijiana Drua
Vani Arei	Centre		Fijiana Drua
Wainikiti Vosadrau			Fijiana Drua

=== Papua New Guinea ===
Papua New Guinea's 31-player squad for the Oceania Championship.

Player	Position	Club
Regila Wilfred	Loose Head Prop	Tribeswomen
Lyanne Philimon	Loose Head Prop	Juggernauts
Janaya Sue Trapman	Loose Head Prop	Brisbane
Geua Larry	Hooker	Nova
Lorraine Pomat	Hooker	Nova
Charlyn Harman	Hooker	FNQLD
Shallain Kopi	Tight Head Prop	Harlequins
Carol Paua	Tight Head Prop	Sisters
Linda Wari	Tight Head Prop	Chiefs
Vanesa Nakas	Lock	Stallions
Lilly Krandem	Lock	Harlequins
Amenda Pakure	Lock	Stallions
Brenda Goro	Lock	Chiefs
Talitha Kunjil	Back Row	Tribeswomen
Marie Biyama	Back Row	Harlequins
Esther Gigimat	Back Row	Nova
Augusta Livuana	Half-back	Harlequins
Meli Joe	Half-back	Tribeswomen
Alice Alois	Half-back	Harlequins
Gemma Schnaubelt	Five Eight	Brisbane
Cynthia Peter	Five Eight	Stallions
Doreen Kaputin	Centre	Chiefs
Joan Butler	Centre	Chiefs
Merolyn Malt	Centre	Tribeswomen
Katherine Wena	Centre	Harlequins
Angelena Watego	Centre	Brisbane
Lyiannah Allen	Outside Back	Tribeswomen
Naomi Kelly	Outside Back	Chiefs
Fatima Rama	Outside Back	Nova
Joana Lagona	Outside Back	Juggernauts
Magadaline Swaki	Outside Back	Tenkiles

=== Samoa ===
Samoa's 28-player squad for the Oceania Championship.

Players
Alanis Caroline Jane Toia	Hope Vavaemamate Schuster
Alyce Lemau Jean Solaese	Jacqui Fofogaopapa Aiono
Ana Lise Sio	Kayla Fay Hunkin-Clark
Ana Mamea	Linda Fiafia
Angelica Sesa Vaisha Schwenke	Makayla Aromahana Eli
Bella Irene Milo	Mary Lumsden
Cassie Muaimalae Tanu Siataga	Masuisuimatama'ali'i Tauaua-Pauaraisa
Cathy Ulu'ulumatafolau Leuta	Michelle Ame Curry
Easter Isadora Aimasi Savelio	Mollie Yvonne Ngahuia Tagaloa
Elesi Leiataua	Nina Maria Foaese
Fa'alua Ioe Tugaga	Olalini Manamea Tafoulua
France Tracey Tapaita Ahea Bloomfield	Philomena Elaine Moana Petaia
Glory Tauvela Aiono	Saewa Vanessa Leaula
Hasting Leiataua	Utumalama Atonio

=== Tonga ===
Tonga's 27-player squad for the Oceania Championship.

Player	Club
Angelina Lomu	(United States) East Palo Alto Razorhawks
Asipau Mafi	(Australia) Melbourne Rebels
Chantelle Kulaea Akanesi Latu	(Australia) Melbourne Rebels
Daniella Walko-Siua	(United States) Cleveland Rugby / Roots Rugby
Fehi Schaaf	(United States) Sacramento Amazons
Lavinia Tauhalaliku	(New Zealand) Manurewa
Leonia Tauelangi	(Australia) Sunnybank Dragons
Loketi Serenity Mahoni	(Australia) West Harbour RFC
Losalio Sita Payne	(Australia) GPS Rugby
Luana Selina Tongia	(Australia) Sunnybank Dragons
Lu'isa Sikata Pita	(Tonga) Hihifo / (Australia) Bond University
Monioca Naomi Kay Drollett Mo'ale	(Australia) ACT Brumbies
Mosiana Lesley Ann Talanoa Ulupano	(Tonga) Kolomotu'a RC
Neomai Tiulipe Ofangaki Vunga	(Tonga) Kolomotu'a RC
Seini Palu	(Australia) Western Suburbs RU
Seli Lisa-Netti Mailangi	(Australia) Gordon RFC
Seneti Kilisimasi	(Australia) NSW Waratahs
Shonte To'a	(Australia) ACT Brumbies
Siale Alatini	(United States) Life West Gladiatrix
Siu Taula Green	(United States) Sacramento Amazons
Siunipa Lesieli Pahulu	(Tonga) Houmale'eia RC / Ngele'ia RC
Siutiti Vea Angalau Ma'ake	(Tonga) Kolomotu'a RC
Sokopeti Jessica Akau'ola	(Tonga) Havelu / Ngele'ia RC
Tohuia Kaihau	(United States) Sacramento Amazons
Tonga Leilani Tuiaki	(Tonga) Hihifo / Houmale'eia RC
Tupou Veiongo Kolomatangi-Lamipeti	(Australia) Queensland Reds
Victoria Vea	(United States) H.E.B Lady Hurricanes
