= Fiji national rugby team =

Fiji national rugby team may refer to:

- Fiji national rugby league team
- Fiji national rugby union team
- Fiji national rugby sevens team
- Fiji women's national rugby union team
- Fiji women's national rugby sevens team
