= 2019 Asia Pacific Championship =

2019 rugby union competition for women's national teams

Tournament details
- Host: Fiji
- Venue: Churchill Park, Lautoka
- Date: 24 May – 1 June
- Teams: 3

Final positions
- Champions: Samoa

Tournament statistics
- Matches played: 3

The 2019 Asia Pacific Women's Championship was a rugby union competition for women's national teams held in Lautoka, Fiji from 24 May to 1 June 2019. It was a single round-robin tournament contested by Fiji, Samoa and Hong Kong. Samoa won the competition after going undefeated in both their matches.

== Teams ==
- Fiji
- Hong Kong
- Samoa

== Table ==
Pos	Team	P	W	D	L	PF	PA	PD
1	Samoa	2	2	0	0	49	24	25
2	Hong Kong	2	1	0	1	41	44	-3
3	Fiji	2	0	0	2	22	44	-22

== Tournament ==
Test: 1323	24 May 2019	Fiji	10–29	Hong Kong	Churchill Park, Lautoka
			Report

Test: 1324	28 May 2019	Hong Kong	15–34	Samoa	Churchill Park, Lautoka
			Report

Test: 1325	1 June 2019	Fiji	12–15	Samoa	Churchill Park, Lautoka
			Report
