= Bella Milo =

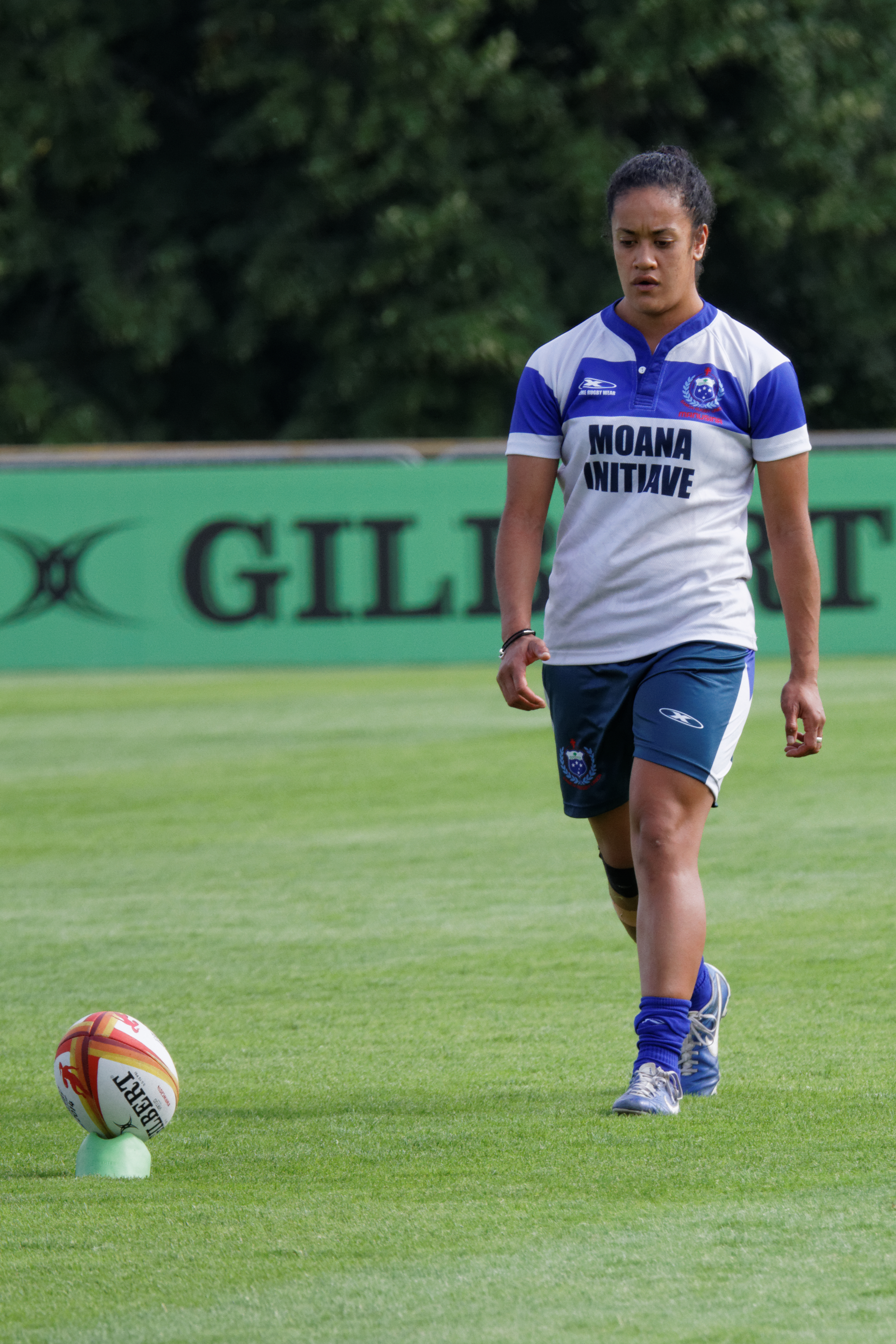
- Training of 2014 Women's Rugby World Cup
- Born: 29 May 1986 (age 40)
- Height: 1.7 m (5 ft 7 in)

Rugby union career
- Position: Fly-half
Provincial / State sides
Years	Team	Apps	(Points)
2008–2014	Auckland	30	(58)
International career
Years	Team	Apps	(Points)
2006–2023	Samoa		
National sevens team
Years	Team		Comps
2016	Samoa		
Coaching career
- Years: Team
- 2017: Hong Kong (assistant coach)

Bella Milo (born 29 May 1986) is a Samoan rugby union player. She competed for Samoa at the 2006 and 2014 Rugby World Cups. She has also represented Samoa in sevens rugby.

== Biography ==
Milo represented Samoa at the 2006 and 2014 Rugby World Cups. In 2014 she took up her cousin's suggestion to play in Hong Kong and three years later she became the backs and the strength and conditioning coach for Hong Kong. She made her third World Cup appearance in 2017 as Hong Kong's assistant coach.

In 2016, Milo featured for the Samoa 7s team at the Olympic repechage tournament in Ireland. In October 2023, she was named in the Manusina Samoa squad for the inaugural WXV 2 tournament in Cape Town, South Africa.
