= Alfreda Fisher =

Fiji international rugby union player

- Alfreda Fisher in 2026
- Born: 9 May 2004 (age 22)
- Height: 182 cm (6 ft 0 in)

Rugby union career
- Position: Back row
Super Rugby
Years	Team	Apps	(Points)
2025–	Fijian Drua		
International career
Years	Team	Apps	(Points)
2024–	Fiji	11	(15)

Alfreda Fisher (born 9 May 2004) is a Fijian rugby union player. She captained Fiji at the 2025 Women's Rugby World Cup.

== Early life ==
Fisher comes from Togo village, Qamea, in Taveuni. Her rugby career began at Bucalevu Secondary School.

== Rugby career ==
Fisher made her international debut for Fiji at the 2024 WXV 3 tournament in Dubai.

She played for Suva in the Marama Championship. She made her Super Rugby Women's debut for the Fijian Drua during the 2025 season.

In May 2025, she became the youngest-ever captain in the history of the Fiji women's fifteens side when she led them against the Wallaroos, who were hosted for the first time in Fiji. She was awarded the Women's Player of the Year at the Fijian Drua Awards Night. Later in June that year, she captained the Fijiana side once again when they retained the Oceania Women's Championship.

She was selected to captain Fiji at the 2025 Women's Rugby World Cup in England. She led the side in their 28–25 victory over Wales.
