= Coral Coast, Fiji =

Stretch of coastline in Fiji

Coordinates: 18°16′10.02″S 177°53′22.39″E

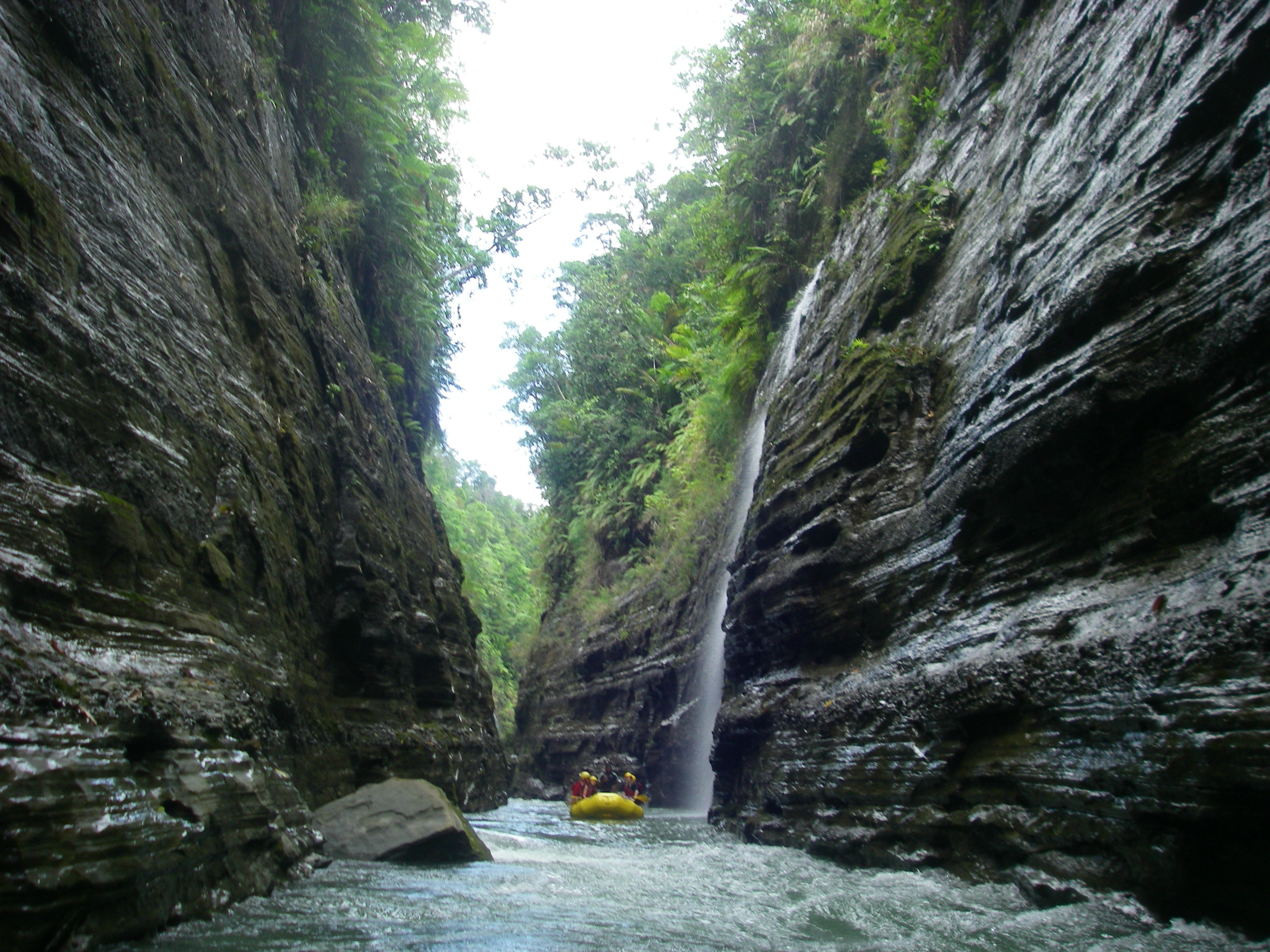
Sigatoka River on the Coral Coast

Coral Coast is the stretch of coastline between Sigatoka and Suva, on the island of Viti Levu, in Fiji.

This stretch of coast is one of Fiji's tourist areas with resorts located in various locations along the coast and on islands just off the coast. The riverside town of Sigatoka is the centre of tourism for the Coral Coast.
