= Ema Adivitaloga =

Fijian rugby union player

- Born: 27 July 1994 (age 32)
- Height: 1.64 m (5 ft 5 in)
- Weight: 64 kg (141 lb)

Rugby union career
- Position: Fullback
Senior career
| Years | Team | Apps | (Points) |
| 2022– | Fijian Drua Women | 4 | (0) |
International career
| Years | Team | Apps | (Points) |
| 2022– | Fiji | 21 | (5) |
National sevens team
| Years | Team | | Comps |
- Fiji

Ema Adivitaloga (born 27 July 1994) is a Fijian rugby union player.

== Rugby career ==
=== Super W ===
Adivitaloga was selected for the Fijiana Drua squad in their debut 2022 Super W season. She started in their debut match against the Rebels. She also featured against the Reds in the second round of the competition. She played against the Waratahs in round five and in the Grand Final.

=== International ===
Adivitaloga was named in the Fijiana squad for two test matches against Australia and Japan in May 2022. She was in the starting lineup in both tests against Japan and Australia. In September she played in a warm up match against Canada. She was also named in the Fijiana squad for the 2021 Rugby World Cup.

On 9 August 2025, she was named in the Fijiana side to the Women's Rugby World Cup in England.
