= Denise Aiolupotea =

Samoa international rugby union player

- Born: 1 October 1998 (age 28)
- Height: 169 cm (5 ft 7 in)
- Weight: 104 kg (229 lb; 16 st 5 lb)

Rugby union career
- Position: Prop
Provincial / State sides
Years	Team	Apps	(Points)
2020–	Hawke's Bay	14	(25)
Super Rugby
Years	Team	Apps	(Points)
2024–	Hurricanes Poua	12	(5)
International career
Years	Team	Apps	(Points)
2024–	Samoa	10	(5)

Denise Aiolupotea (born 1 October 1998) (Note: Aiolupotea's year of birth is listed as 1998, however, her Rugby World Cup profile has her age listed as 36 years old.) is a Samoan rugby union player. She represents Samoa internationally and plays for Hurricanes Poua in the Super Rugby Aupiki competition.

== Netball career ==
Aiolupotea was selected for Samoa's national netball team when she was 19.

She was a netball development officer for Hawke's Bay Netball for six and a half years before she took up a role at Netball Hutt Valley.

Aiolupotea returned to Hawke's Bay Netball and was appointed as their Operations Manager earlier in 2022, before she was appointed as their new General Manager. She resigned from the position in 2024.

== Rugby career ==
Aiolupotea plays for Hawke's Bay at provincial level. On 30 October 2024, she was named in the Hurricanes Poua squad for the 2025 Super Rugby Aupiki season.

She was named in the Manusina side to the 2025 Women's Rugby World Cup in England.
