= 2019 Oceania Rugby Women's Championship =

2019 Oceania Women's Championship
Tournament details
- Host: Fiji
- Venue: Churchill Park, Lautoka
- Date: 18 November 2019– 30 November 2019
- Teams: 6

Final positions
- Champions: New Zealand

The 2019 Oceania Rugby Women's Championship that was held in Fiji, was the 2021 Rugby World Cup qualifier for the Oceania region. The tournament was played at Churchill Park in Lautoka from 18 to 30 November 2019, with six teams entered. Australia and New Zealand sent development teams, having already qualified for the 2021 World Cup.

== Teams ==
- Black Ferns Dev. XV
- Samoa
- Tonga
- Australia A
- Fiji
- Papua New Guinea

== Format ==
A split pool format was used for the Oceania tournament, with the teams seeded into two pools of three. Each team was scheduled to play one match against each of the teams in the opposite pool. However, following a measles outbreak in Tonga, the Tongan women's team had to withdraw from competition after one of their players arriving in Fiji was suspected of having measles. The tournament continued without playing their fixtures but a revised qualification process was put in place to allow Tonga to challenge later for the Oceania berth at the Rugby World Cup repechage qualifier.

The Black Ferns Development XV were undefeated in the tournament and won the 2019 Oceania Rugby Women's Championship based on the combined pool standings, with Australia A as runner-up. Qualification to the World Cup remained up for grabs in Lautoka for the remaining three nations (excluding Australia and New Zealand). Fiji won direct entry to the World Cup by defeating Samoa in the qualifying playoff match.

Arrangements were made for a playoff match in early 2020 between Tonga and Papua New Guinea, with the winner to meet Samoa in another playoff match to decide the World Cup repechage berth.

== Tournament ==
=== Pool stage ===
Pool A
Pos	Team	P	W	D	L	PF	PA	PD	Pts
1	Black Ferns Dev. XV	3	3	0	0	234	0	+234	15
2	Samoa	3	1	0	2	77	65	+12	5
3	Tonga	1	0	1	0	0	0	0	2

Pool B
Pos	Team	P	W	D	L	PF	PA	PD	Pts
1	Australia A	3	1	1	1	27	55	−28	7
2	Fiji	2	1	0	1	26	60	−34	5
3	Papua New Guinea	2	0	0	2	12	196	-184	0

Round 1

18 November	Australia A	0–0 ^{a}	Tonga	Churchill Park, Lautoka
		Report

Test: 1370	18 November	Samoa	65–12	Papua New Guinea	Churchill Park, Lautoka
			Report

18 November	Black Ferns Dev XV	53–0	Fiji	Churchill Park, Lautoka
		Report

Notes:

^^{a} The match was cancelled and called a draw.

Round 2

22 November	Australia A	0–50	Black Ferns Dev XV	Churchill Park, Lautoka
		Report

Test: 1372	22 November	Samoa	7–26	Fiji	Churchill Park, Lautoka
			Report

Bye/s: Papua New Guinea

Round 3

26 November	Black Ferns Dev XV	131–0	Papua New Guinea	Churchill Park, Lautoka
		Report

26 November	Australia A	27–5	Samoa	Churchill Park, Lautoka
		Report

Bye/s: Fiji

=== Playoffs ===
Samoa and Fiji played in the World Cup qualifier match at Lautoka. Due to Tonga's absence, a consolation match was arranged for Papua New Guinea against a Fiji developmental team.

==== Consolation match ====
30 November	Fijiana Dev XV	40–22	Papua New Guinea	Churchill Park, Lautoka
		Report

==== World Cup qualifier ====
Test: 1379	30 November	to RWC Fiji	41–13	Samoa	Churchill Park, Lautoka
			Report

=== Repechage qualifiers ===
Tonga traveled to Port Moresby in March the following year and defeated Papua New Guinea to set up a playoff against Samoa to determine who qualified for the repechage tournament.

Test: 1389	1 March 2020	Papua New Guinea	24–36	Tonga	Bava Park, Port Moresby
			Report

Test: 1397	14 November 2020	to repechage Samoa	40–0	Tonga	The Trusts Arena, Auckland, New Zealand
