= 2024 Oceania Rugby Women's Championship =

2024 Oceania Women's Championship
Tournament details
- Host: Australia
- Venue: Sunnybank Rugby Club, Brisbane
- Date: 24 May 2024–2 June 2024
- Teams: 4

Final positions
- Champions: Fiji (4th title)
- Runner-up: Samoa

Tournament statistics
- Matches played: 5

The 2024 Oceania Rugby Women's Championship is the tournament's sixth edition and will be held in Brisbane, Queensland from 24 May to 2 June. The winner qualifies directly for the 2025 Women's Rugby World Cup and for the 2024 WXV 3, whereas the runner-up qualifies only for WXV 3.

The second match of the opening day between Samoa and Papua New Guinea was cancelled due to unforeseen travel issues that prevented Papua New Guinea from arriving on time.

Fiji claimed their fourth title with their win over Samoa and qualified for the World Cup in England. Both teams also qualified for the WXV 3 tournament in Dubai.

== Table ==
| Pos | Team | Pld | W | D | L | PF | PA | PD | TF | TA | TB | LB | Pts | Qualification |
|---|---|---|---|---|---|---|---|---|---|---|---|---|---|---|
| 1 | Fiji (C) | 3 | 3 | 0 | 0 | 160 | 22 | +138 | 24 | 2 | 2 | 0 | 14 | Qualifies for the 2025 Women's Rugby World Cup and 2024 WXV 3 |
| 2 | Samoa (Note: Samoa were awarded a default victory and received 5 points after their cancelled game against Papua New Guinea.) | 2 | 1 | 0 | 1 | 42 | 34 | +8 | 6 | 4 | 1 | 0 | 10 | Qualifies for 2024 WXV 3 |
| 3 | Tonga | 3 | 1 | 0 | 2 | 49 | 82 | −33 | 8 | 13 | 1 | 0 | 5 | |
| 4 | Papua New Guinea | 2 | 0 | 0 | 2 | 11 | 124 | −113 | 1 | 20 | 0 | 0 | 0 | |

Source: Oceania Rugby
(C) Champion

== Tournament ==
=== Round 1 ===
24 May 2024
17:30 AEST (UTC+10)

| Fiji | 48–3 | Tonga |
| Try: Sulita Waisega (2) 12' m, 45' c Vika Matarugu 16' c Vani Arei (2) 25' m, 37' c Adita Milinia 34' m Atelaite Ralivanawa 48' m Litia Marama 64' c Con: Luisa Tisolo (4) 18', 38', 46', 65' | Report | Pen: Shonte Toa 11' |

Sunnybank Rugby, Brisbane
Referee: Jessica Ling (AUS)

24 May 2024
19:30 AEST (UTC+10)

| Samoa | Cancelled (Note: Samoa were awarded a default victory and received 5 competition points.) | Papua New Guinea |
| | Report |

Sunnybank Rugby Club

=== Round 2 ===
29 May 2024
17:30 AEST (UTC+10)

| Fiji | 85–6 | Papua New Guinea |
| Try: Merewai Cumu 5' c Karalaini Naisewa (2) 10' m, 34' c Atelaite Ralivanawa (4) 17' c, 44' c, 52' m, 56' c Fulori Nabura 23' c Asinate Serevi 31' c Merewairita Neivosa 60' m Repeka Adi Tove 69' c Adita Milinia 73' c Sulita Waisega 79' c Con: Luisa Tisolo (10) 6', 18', 24', 32', 35', 45', 57', 71', 74', 80'; Cards: Setaita Railumu (yellow card) 48' to 58' | Report | Pen: Joanne Lagona (2) 39', 49' |

Sunnybank Rugby, Brisbane
Referee: Jessica Ling (AUS)

29 May 2024
19:30 AEST (UTC+10)

| Samoa | 29–7 | Tonga |
| Try: Sui Pauaraisa (2) 2' c, 30' c Lutia Col Aumua 11' c France Bloomfield 74' m Con: Cassie Siataga (3) 3', 12', 31'; Pen: Cassie Siataga 58'; Cards: Angel Schwencke (yellow card) 20' to 30'; Sui Pauaraisa (red card) 37' | Report | Try: Vineta Teutau 23' c Con: Shonte Toa 24' |

Sunnybank Rugby, Brisbane
Referee: Lavenia Racaca (FRU)

=== Round 3 ===
2 June 2024
14:00 AEST (UTC+10)

| Tonga | 39–5 | Papua New Guinea |
| Try: Iunaise Fakahua 7' c Tonga Tuiaki (3) 14' m, 18' m, 63' m Loketi Serenity Mahoni 32' m Ayla Cook 38' c Margaret Manase 77' m Con: Mele Akolo (2) 8', 39' | Report | Try: Doreen Kaputin 45' m |

Sunnybank Rugby, Brisbane
Referee: Lavenia Racaca (FRU)

2 June 2024
16:00 AEST (UTC+10)

| Samoa | 13–27 | Fiji |
| Try: Linda Fiafia 39' m Tyra Boysen Auimatagi 55' m Pen: Cassie Siataga 45'; Cards: Cassie Siataga (yellow card) 72' to end' Isadora Leio Laupola (yellow card) 73' to end' | Report | Try: Doreen Narokete 9' c Jennifer Ravutia 23' c Evivi Senikarivi 28' c Con: Luisa Tisolo (3) 10', 24', 29'; Pen: Luisa Tisolo (2) 60', 73'; Cards: Luisa Tisolo (yellow card) 75' to end' |

Sunnybank Rugby, Brisbane
Referee: Jessica Ling (AUS)
