= Women's Pacific Tri-Nations =

Tournament details
- Host: Tonga
- Venue: Teufaiva Park
- Date: 14–22 April 2006
- Countries: Fiji; Samoa; Tonga
- Teams: 3

Final positions
- Champions: Samoa

Tournament statistics
- Matches played: 3

The Women's Pacific Tri-Nations tournament was contested in April 2006 at the Teufaiva Park in Nuku’alofa, Tonga. It was the only time the tournament was held.

Samoa had been playing international rugby since 2000, and competed in two World Cups. Fiji and Tonga were making their international debut in women's fifteens.

Although a Samoan victory was hardly unexpected, Fiji pushed them close. Overall the tournament was a success.

== Final table ==
Pos	Nation	Pld	W	D	L	PF	PA	PD	Pts
1	Samoa	2	2	0	0	87	20	+67	4
2	Fiji	2	1	0	1	67	32	+35	2
3	Tonga	2	0	0	2	10	112	−102	0

== Results ==
2006-04-14

Fiji	15–27	Samoa

Teufaiva Park, Nuku’alofa

2006-04-18

Tonga	5–52	Fiji

Teufaiva Park, Nuku’alofa

2006-04-22

Tonga	5–60	Samoa

Teufaiva Park, Nuku’alofa

== See also ==
- Oceania Rugby Women’s Championship
- Women's international rugby union
