= Bava Park =

Sports center in Papua New Guinea

Coordinates: 9°28′28.6″S 147°12′13.6″E

- Interactive map of Bava Park
- Location: Bava Street, Port Moresby
- Operator: PNG Sports Foundation
- Capacity: 5,000
- Surface: Grass

Tenant
- Papua New Guinea national football team

The Bava Park Is a sports center located between Bava Street and Bisini Road in the city of Port Moresby, the capital of Papua New Guinea. It is generally used for soccer and rugby matches. It has a capacity to receive 5,000 spectators.

It was one of the four venues that was chosen by FIFA that received matches for the 2016 FIFA U-20 Women's World Cup. In the stadium were played 4 of the matches of group B and one of the group C and D.

The venue is part of the Bisini Parade Sports Complex.
