= 2018 Oceania Rugby Women's Championship =

2018 Oceania Women's Championship
Tournament details
- Host: Fiji
- Venue: Churchill Park, Lautoka
- Date: 16 November 2018– 24 November 2018
- Teams: 4

Final positions
- Champions: Fiji

Tournament statistics
- Matches played: 6

The 2018 Oceania Rugby Women's Championship was the second edition of the competition. It was held in Churchill Park, Lautoka, Fiji from 16 to 24 November. Samoa and Tonga joined the competition this year. Fiji successfully defended their Oceania Championship title defeating Samoa 43–12.

== Tournament ==
=== Table ===
Pos	Team	Pld	W	D	L	PF	PA	PD	BP	Pts
1	Fiji	3	3	0	0	192	20	+172	3	15
2	Samoa	3	2	0	1	136	95	+41	2	10
3	Tonga	3	1	0	2	77	147	−70	1	5
4	Papua New Guinea	3	0	0	3	71	214	−143	2	2

=== Match results ===
Round 1

2018-11-16

Papua New Guinea	45–56	Samoa
	Report

Churchill Park, Lautoka

2018-11-16

Fiji	53–8	Tonga
	Report

Churchill Park, Lautoka

Round 2

2018-11-20

Samoa	68–7	Tonga
	Report

Churchill Park, Lautoka

2018-11-20

Fiji	96–0	Papua New Guinea
	Report

Churchill Park, Lautoka

Round 3

2018-11-24

Tonga	62–26	Papua New Guinea

Churchill Park, Lautoka

2018-11-24

Fiji	43–12	Samoa
	Report

Churchill Park, Lautoka
