= Tonga women's national rugby union team =

Rugby union team

Tonga
- Nickname: 'Ikale Tahi
- Union: Tonga Rugby Union
- Head coach: Fili Sau
First colours	Second colours

World Rugby ranking
- Current: 27 (as of 2 March 2026)
- Lowest: 27 (2024,2026)

First international
- Tonga 5–52 Fiji (Teufaiva Park, Nuku’alofa; 18 April 2006)

Biggest win
- Tonga 108–7 Papua New Guinea (Massey Park, Auckland; 18 July 2022)

Biggest defeat
- Samoa 68–7 Tonga (Churchill Park, Lautoka; 20 November 2018)

The Tonga women's national rugby union team (Tongan: timi feohi ʻakapulu fakafonua fefine ʻa Tonga) are a national sporting side of Tonga, representing them at rugby union. They compete annually in the Oceania Rugby Women's Championship.

== History ==
Tonga played their first international test match against Fiji in 2006 at the Women's Pacific Tri-Nations. Tonga joined the Oceania Rugby Women's Championship in 2018. They recorded their first and biggest win at the 2018 Oceania Championship over Papua New Guinea with a score of 62–26.

There was a measles outbreak in Tonga in 2019, so the team had to withdraw from the Oceania Championship when a player was suspected of having measles. The tournament also acted as a qualifier for the 2021 Rugby World Cup and was revised to allow Tonga to compete for the Oceania berth. Fiji won the Oceania regions only spot and qualified for the World Cup.

In 2020 Tonga played Papua New Guinea and Samoa in a Repechage qualifier playoff for a spot in the Final Qualification Tournament for the 2021 World Cup. Samoa were the team to progress.

Tonga placed third at the 2022 Oceania Rugby Championship.

== Results summary ==
(Full internationals only, updated to 10 June 2025)

Tonga Internationals From 2006
Opponent	First Match	Played	Won	Drawn	Lost	Win %
Fiji	2006	6	0	0	6	0.00%
PNG	2018	5	5	0	0	100.00%
Samoa	2006	7	0	0	7	0.00%
Summary		18	5	0	13	31.25%

== Players ==
=== Recent squad ===
Tonga named a 27-player squad for the 2023 Oceania Rugby Women's Championship.

Player	Club
Angelina Lomu	(United States) East Palo Alto Razorhawks
Asipau Mafi	(Australia) Melbourne Rebels
Chantelle Kulaea Akanesi Latu	(Australia) Melbourne Rebels
Daniella Walko-Siua	(United States) Cleveland Rugby / Roots Rugby
Fehi Schaaf	(United States) Sacramento Amazons
Lavinia Tauhalaliku	(New Zealand) Manurewa
Leonia Tauelangi	(Australia) Sunnybank Dragons
Loketi Serenity Mahoni	(Australia) West Harbour RFC
Losalio Sita Payne	(Australia) GPS Rugby
Luana Selina Tongia	(Australia) Sunnybank Dragons
Lu'isa Sikata Pita	(Tonga) Hihifo / (Australia) Bond University
Monioca Naomi Kay Drollett Mo'ale	(Australia) ACT Brumbies
Mosiana Lesley Ann Talanoa Ulupano	(Tonga) Kolomotu'a RC
Neomai Tiulipe Ofangaki Vunga	(Tonga) Kolomotu'aj RC
Seini Palu	(Australia) Western Suburbs RU
Seli Lisa-Netti Mailangi	(Australia) Gordon RFC
Seneti Kilisimasi	(Australia) NSW Waratahs
Shonte To'a	(Australia) ACT Brumbies
Siale Alatini	(United States) Life West Gladiatrix
Siu Taula Green	(United States) Sacramento Amazons
Siunipa Lesieli Pahulu	(Tonga) Houmale'eia RC / Ngele'ia RC
Siutiti Vea Angalau Ma'ake	(Tonga) Kolomotu'a RC
Sokopeti Jessica Akau'ola	(Tonga) Havelu / Ngele'ia RC
Tohuia Kaihau	(United States) Sacramento Amazons
Tonga Leilani Tuiaki	(Tonga) Hihifo / Houmale'eia RC
Tupou Veiongo Kolomatangi-Lamipeti	(Australia) Queensland Reds
Victoria Vea	(United States) H.E.B Lady Hurricanes

== Coaching staff ==
Name	Position
Fili Sau	Head Coach
	Forwards Coach
Tina Latu	Backs Coach
Pula Kolokihakaufusi	Strength & Conditioning Coach
Alyssa Ilaisa'ane Le	Manager
Seluvaia Taunaholo	Team Doctor
Makasiamane Taulangovak	Team Physio
