= Sigatoka =

Sigatoka सिन्गातोका (Hindi)
- Town
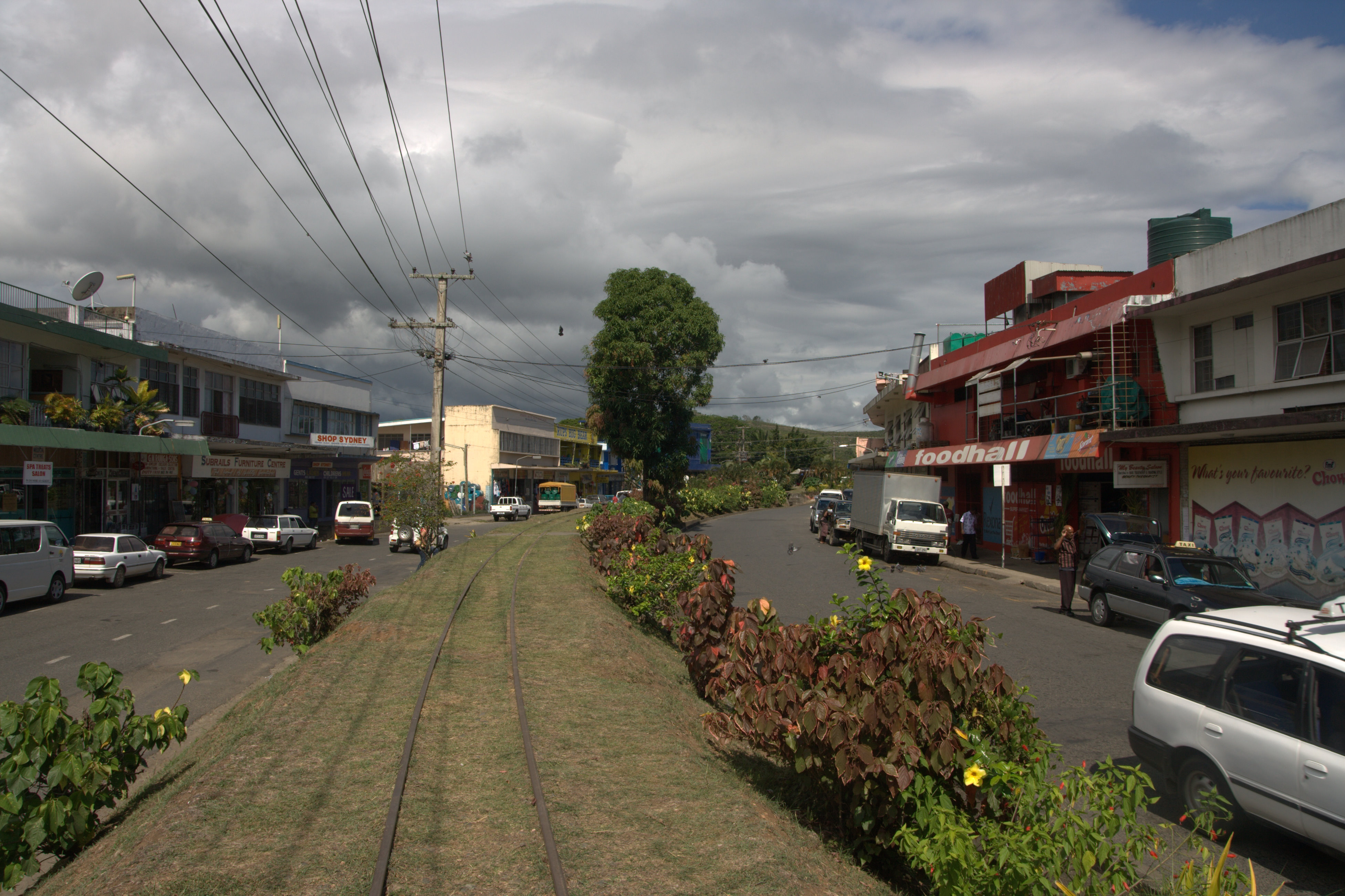
- Sigatoka

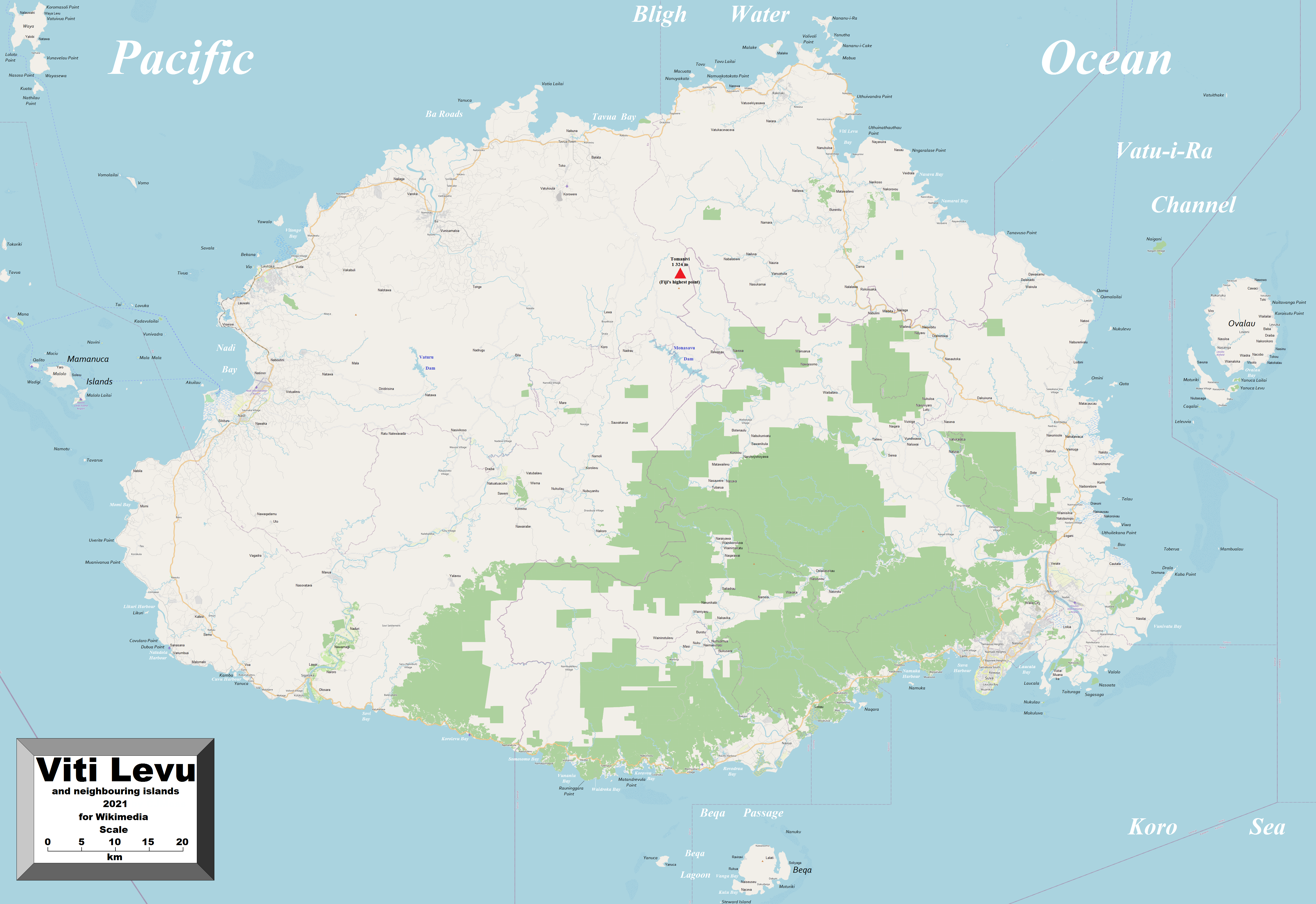
- Viti Levu with Sigatoka on the southwest coast

- Location in Fiji
- Coordinates: 18°08′29″S 177°30′25″E
- Country: Fiji
- Island: Viti Levu
- Division: Central Division
- Province: Nadroga-Navosa
- District: Sigatoka

Population (2017)
  - Total: 17,622
- Time zone: UTC+12
- Location: 61km west of Suva

Sigatoka (Fijian pronunciation: [siŋatoka], Fiji Hindi: सिन्गातोका) is a town in Fiji. It is on the island of Viti Levu at the mouth of the Sigatoka River, for which it is named, some 61 kilometres from Nadi. Its population at the 2017 census was 17,622. It is the principal urban centre for the province of Nadroga-Navosa.

An ornate temple, open to public and built by Hare Krishna devotees, dominates the Sigatoka skyline. Major tourist attractions include the Sigatoka Sand Dunes near Kulukulu village, two kilometres northwest of Sigatoka; and the Kula Eco Park, with some 500 birds of 100 species from many tropical countries. The town is also the principal centre for Fiji's coastal tourism belt—the Coral Coast—which has many of the country's leading hotels and resorts.

== Governance ==
Sigatoka was incorporated as a town in 1959, and is governed by a 10-member Sigatoka Town Council, elected for a three-year term. At the last municipal elections, held on 22 October 2005, all 10 seats were won by a coalition of the Soqosoqo Duavata ni Lewenivanua (SDL) and the National Federation Party (NFP). The new council re-elected Ratu Isikeli Tasere as Mayor, a position held for a one-year term, renewable any number of times.

In 2009, the Military-backed interim government dismissed all municipal governments throughout Fiji and appointed special administrators to run the urban areas. As of 2015, elected municipal government has not been restored. The special administrator of Sigatoka is Aisea Tudiraki. The Town Council CEO is Anand Sami Pillay.

== Agriculture ==
From 1912 to 1923, banana plantations in the Sigatoka Valley suffered severe episodes of a fungal infection known as the Yellow Sigatoka disease. The Black sigatoka, an even more ravaging plant disease, is related.

The Sigatoka Valley is known for its high production of vegetables, and thus referred to as Fiji's "Salad Bowl".

== Climate ==
Climate data for Sigatoka (Nacocolevu Research Station) (1991–2020 normals)
Month	Jan	Feb	Mar	Apr	May	Jun	Jul	Aug	Sep	Oct	Nov	Dec	Year
Mean daily maximum °C (°F)	31.6 (88.9)	31.8 (89.2)	31.8 (89.2)	31.1 (88.0)	29.5 (85.1)	28.8 (83.8)	27.9 (82.2)	28.1 (82.6)	28.7 (83.7)	29.7 (85.5)	30.7 (87.3)	31.4 (88.5)	30.1 (86.2)
Mean daily minimum °C (°F)	22.6 (72.7)	22.8 (73.0)	22.7 (72.9)	21.9 (71.4)	20.0 (68.0)	19.1 (66.4)	18.2 (64.8)	18.2 (64.8)	18.8 (65.8)	19.9 (67.8)	20.9 (69.6)	22.1 (71.8)	20.6 (69.1)
Average precipitation days (≥ 1.0 mm)	14.4	14.5	15.4	10.5	6.4	6.0	6.1	5.8	6.2	7.2	8.9	12.2	113.6
Source: World Meteorological Organization

== Education ==
Sigatoka is also known for many education institutes. It has a number of primary and secondary schools. It has the St Joan of Arc Primary School, Nadroga Sangam School, Sigatoka Methodist Primary School and Sigatoka Methodist Secondary (High) School, Cuvu college, St Teresa of Lisiuex primary and Lisiuex college (formerly known as Bemana Catholic Primary and Secondary School), Nadroga-Navosa High School and Andhra High School. Majority of the residents in Sigatoka Town would have attended Sigatoka Methodist High School (now Sigatoka Methodist College). Sigatoka Andhra High School currently holds the second highest pass rate following Nadroga Arya College.

Methodist Primary School is one of the largest primary schools in Sigatoka Town. It has more than one thousand students. There is a ratio of sixty two students per one teacher. Students attend primary school from six years of age.

== Sports ==
Sigatoka, essentially part of Nadroga province is home to the champion Nadroga Rugby Union team who have won a number of locally sponsored rugby union competitions (no exact figure) and the Farebrother-Sullivan Trophy eighty-one times. Sigatoka is now commonly dubbed as "Rugby Town" due to the provincial rugby team's influence on the Fiji national rugby scene. The town is also home to the Nadroga Soccer Association. Despite all the past glory, the NSA is currently struggling to keep in the top flight due to a number of reasons. Cited by the current President of NSA are financial reasons and poaching of talent to name a few. They managed to secure sixth position in the latest Fiji Football League. Sigatoka is also the home town of Iliesa Delana, Fiji's and the South Pacific's first gold medalist in the Paralympic Games (2012).

== Health ==
Health care is still primarily state-funded and most people in Sigatoka and Nadroga/Navosa province access public health and medical services which are largely free or with minimal fees. Sigatoka Town has one local hospital (Sigatoka Sub-Divisional Hospital) and there are health centres located in various districts in the province of Nadroga/Navosa. There is a limited number of private medical and dental practitioners located in the centre of the town.

== Economy ==
Sigatoka's economy is largely dictated by the flow-on effects of the broader Nadroga/Navosa economy. Nadroga contains a high concentration of Hotels and Resorts outside of Nadi. There are several resorts in Sigatokal. Recently, there has also been major growth in international residential developments.

Tourism accounts for a large number of employees and provincial development. Nadroga is also regarded and nicknamed the 'Salad Bowl of Fiji', specifically the Sigatoka Valley, which produces a high volume of the nation's fruits, spices and vegetables, both for local consumption and export. Dalo (or Taro), often the domain of Eastern Fiji, is not so widely produced in Nadroga, however, cassava (tapioca) is produced for consumption and export. The province is one of Fiji's sugar producing areas, however the number of farms and production have declined in the past 10 years as farmers seek to diversify their crops and move to more lucrative crop options.[4] Expiring native land leases have also contributed to a decline in sugar production. Cattle (beef) farming used to be a major economic activity led by the government-supported Yalavou Cattle Scheme, however this has also declined in recent years. Sigatoka's economy has benefited from the flow-on effect of tourism and agriculture in the greater Nadroga/Navosa province. The town provides an essential service point for hotel industry, hotel workers, farmers and so forth, in terms of provision of wholesale/retail goods, government services, police, utilities and administration. The international headquarters of Pacific Green Industries (Fiji) Limited is located in Sigatoka.

== Prominent Sigatoka people ==
- Nadolo, Nemani - Fijian Rugby Union player currently playing for Leicester Tigers in the English Premiership.
- Delana, Iliesa – Fiji's only gold medal paralympian
- Nadruku, Noa – represented Fiji at both league and union
- Nalaga, Napolioni – Winger, plays for Clermont rugby
- Qera, Akapusi – Current Fiji rugby captain, flanker, currently playing for Agen
- Speed, Adi Kuini former MP and wife of former PM Timoci Bavadra
- Tuqiri, Lote – represented Fiji and the Wallabies at both league and union

== Gallery ==
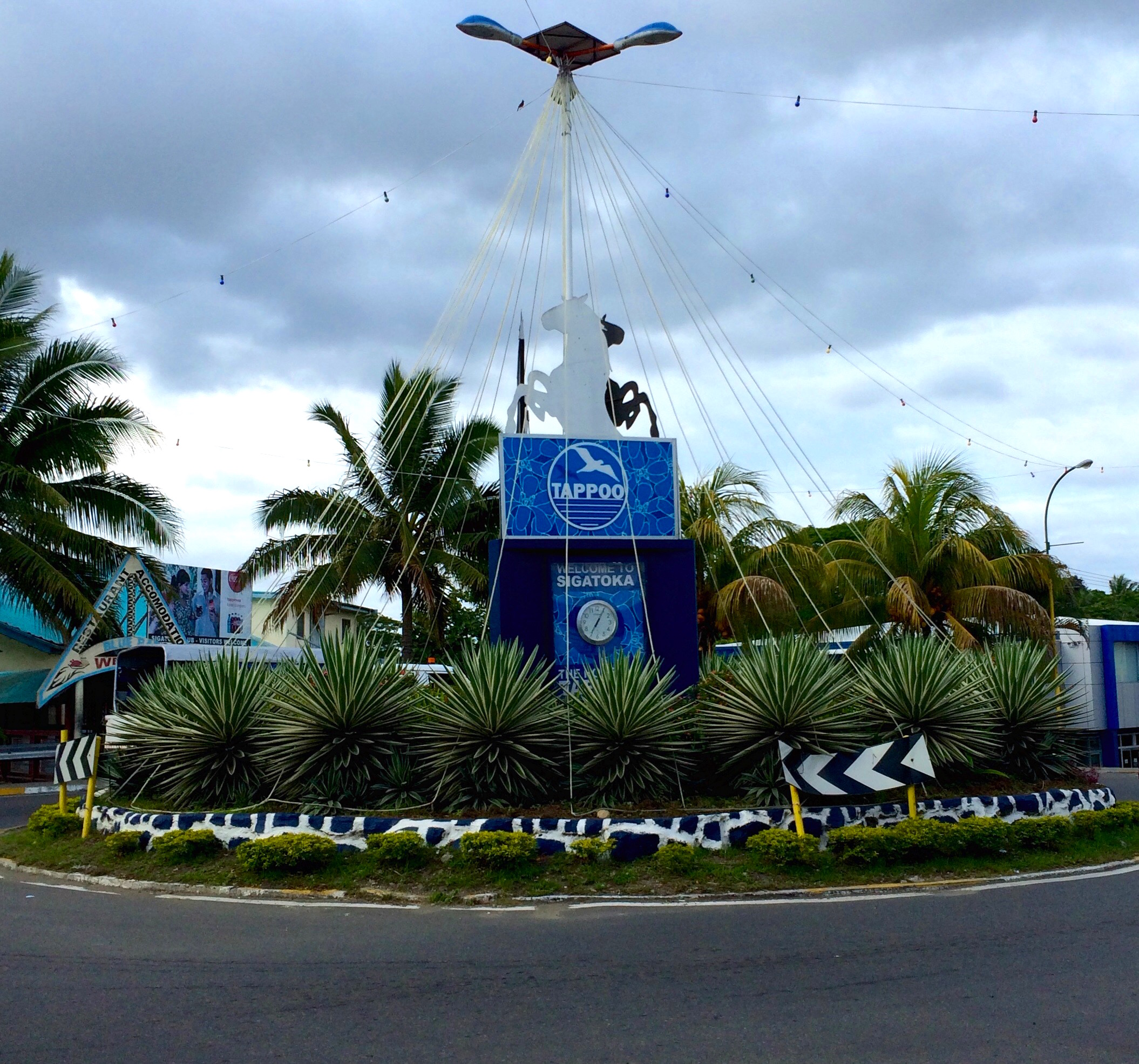
Sigatoka welcome sign.

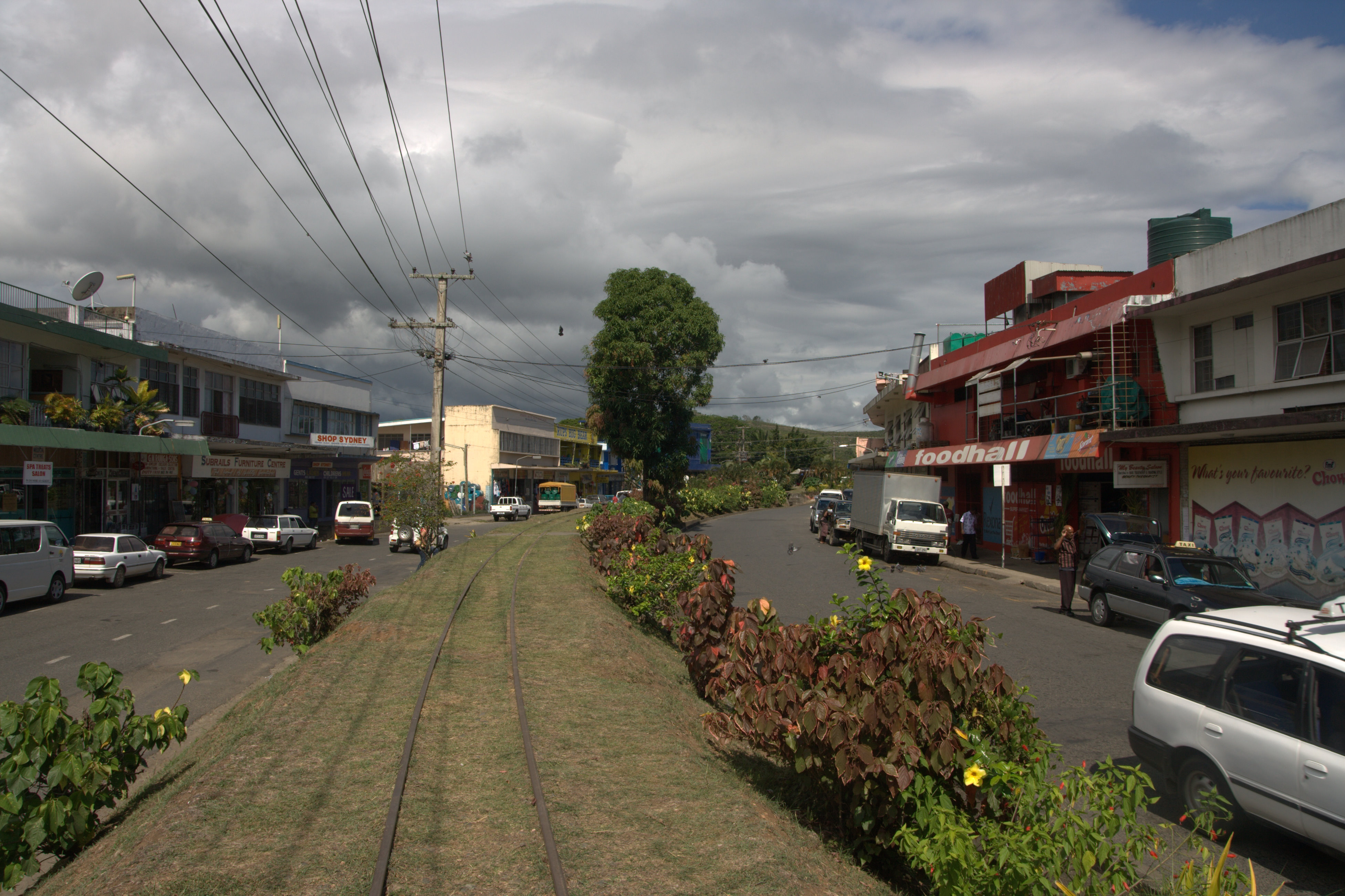
Sigatoka Town Centre

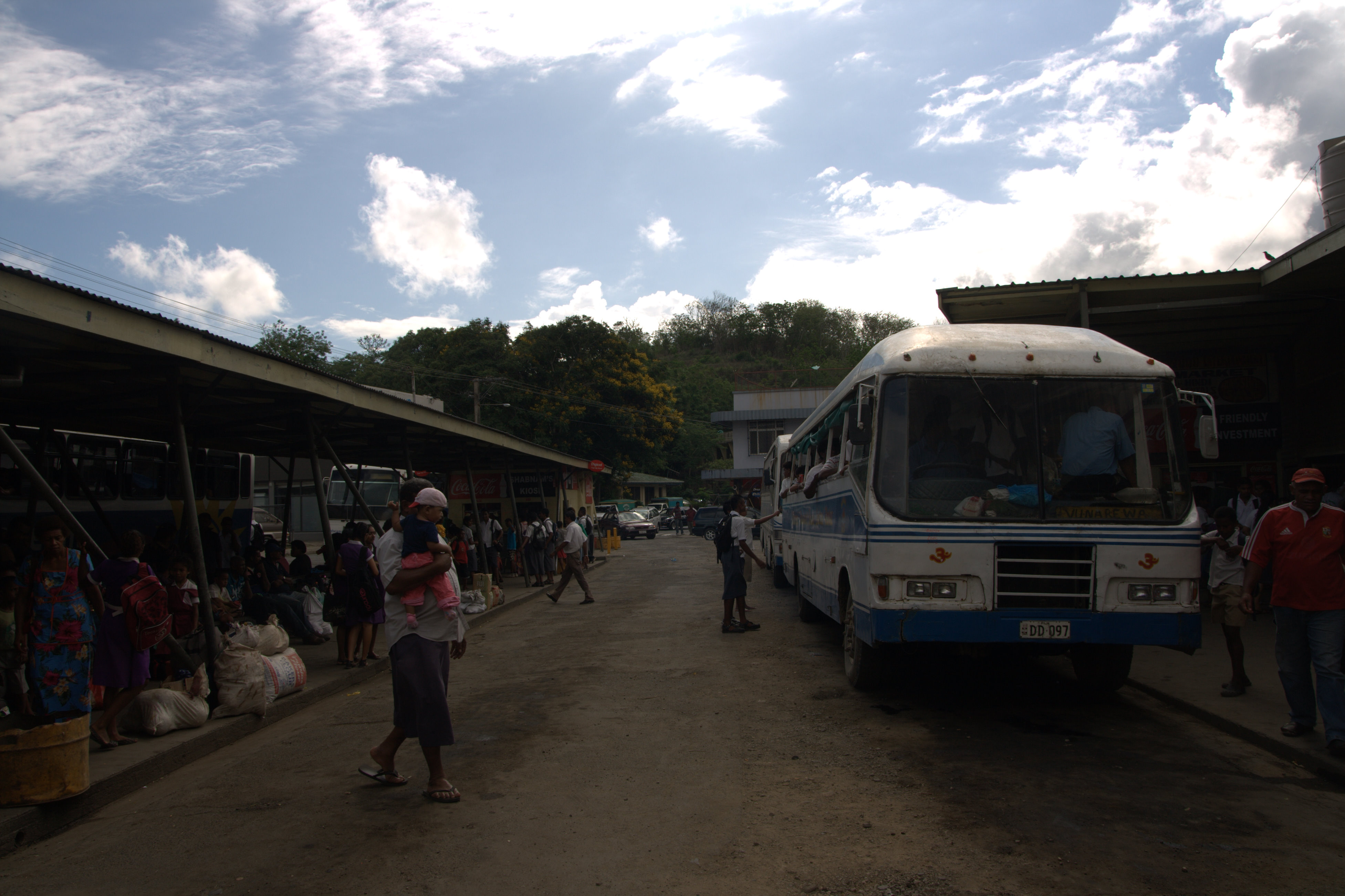
Sigatoka Bus Station.

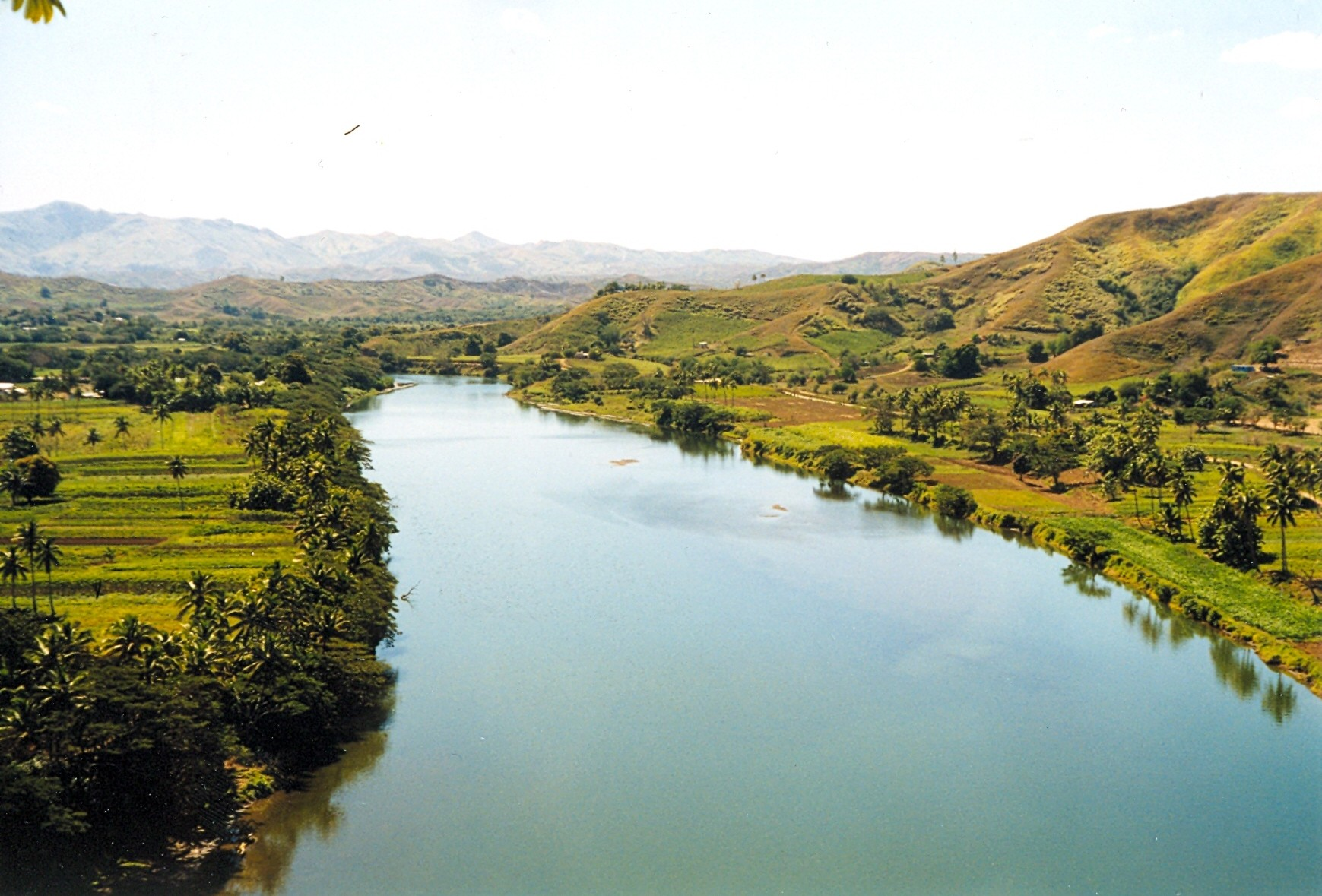
Sigatoka River.

== Additional sources ==
- X. Mourichon, J. Carlier & E. Fouré (1997), Sigatoka Leaf Spot Diseases (Black and Yellow Sigatoka), Musa Disease Fact Sheet No. 8, INIBAP, archived from the original on 4 December 2007
- G. Orjeda (1998), Evaluation of Musa germplasm for resistance to Sigatoka diseases and Fusarium wilt, INIBAP Technical Guidelines 3, IPGRI – INIBAP – ACP-EU, archived from the original on 4 December 2007
