= Papua New Guinea women's national rugby union team =

Papua New Guinea
- Nickname: Cassowaries
- Union: Rugby PNG
- Head coach: John Larry
- Captain: Margaret Naua
First colours

World Rugby ranking
- Current: 48 (as of 2 March 2026)
- Highest: 40 (2016)
- Lowest: 55 (2024)

First international
- Fiji 37–10 Papua New Guinea (HFC Bank Stadium, Suva; 5 November 2016)

Biggest defeat
- Fiji 152–0 Papua New Guinea (Massey Park, Auckland; 9 July 2022)

The Papua New Guinea women's national rugby union team played their first international against Fiji in 2016. They compete annually in the Oceania Rugby Women's Championship, and have not qualified for the Rugby World Cup as yet.

== History ==
Papua New Guinea played their first international test match at the inaugural 2016 Oceania Rugby Women's Championship against Fiji. The tournament was also part of the qualifying process for the 2017 Women's Rugby World Cup. Fiji won the match 37–10 and progressed to the Repechage tournament.

The Palais competed at the 2018 Oceania Championships and finished last overall, Samoa and Tonga had joined the competition for the first time.

At the 2019 Oceania Championships in Fiji, the Palais played Samoa and a Black Ferns Development XV's team. They also played a consolation match against a Fijiana Development XV's team because the main team would be playing in a qualifier against Samoa for the 2021 Rugby World Cup. The 2019 tournament had to be restructured to cater for the Tongan team due to a measles outbreak in their country.

In 2020 Papua New Guinea hosted Tonga at Port Moresby in a repechage qualifier for the 2021 World Cup. It was the first women's test match to be played in the country. Tonga defeated PNG 36–24 and went on to meet Samoa for the repechage playoff.

=== Nickname change ===
Papua New Guinea changed their nickname from Palais, which is Tok Pisin for lizard, to Cassowaries because of sponsorship restrictions. The nickname comes from the Cassowary, a flightless bird that is regarded as the world's most dangerous bird.

On 6 September 2024, it was announced that Rugby PNG was suspended from Oceania Rugby, the team will not be able to pariticpate in any regional, Oceania or international competitions until their suspension is lifted.

== Results summary ==
(Full internationals only, updated to 2 June 2024)

Papua New Guinea Internationals From 2016
Opponent	First Match	Played	Won	Drawn	Lost	For	Against	Win %
Fiji	2016	5	0	0	5	16	447	0.00%
Samoa	2018	4	0	0	4	57	295	0.00%
Tonga	2018	5	0	0	5	84	275	0.00%
Summary		14	0	0	14	157	1,017	0.00%

== Squad ==
=== Recent squad ===
Papua New Guinea's squad to the 2023 Oceania Rugby Women's Championship.

Player	Position	Club
Regila Wilfred	Loose Head Prop	Tribeswomen
Lyanne Philimon	Loose Head Prop	Juggernauts
Janaya Sue Trapman	Loose Head Prop	Brisbane
Geua Larry	Hooker	Nova
Lorraine Pomat	Hooker	Nova
Charlyn Harman	Hooker	FNQLD
Shallain Kopi	Tight Head Prop	Harlequins
Carol Paua	Tight Head Prop	Sisters
Linda Wari	Tight Head Prop	Chiefs
Vanesa Nakas	Lock	Stallions
Lilly Krandem	Lock	Harlequins
Amenda Pakure	Lock	Stallions
Brenda Goro	Lock	Chiefs
Talitha Kunjil	Back Row	Tribeswomen
Marie Biyama	Back Row	Harlequins
Esther Gigimat	Back Row	Nova
Augusta Livuana	Half-back	Harlequins
Meli Joe	Half-back	Tribeswomen
Alice Alois	Half-back	Harlequins
Gemma Schnaubelt	Five Eight	Brisbane
Cynthia Peter	Five Eight	Stallions
Doreen Kaputin	Centre	Chiefs
Joan Butler	Centre	Chiefs
Merolyn Malt	Centre	Tribeswomen
Katherine Wena	Centre	Harlequins
Angelena Watego	Centre	Brisbane
Lyiannah Allen	Outside Back	Tribeswomen
Naomi Kelly	Outside Back	Chiefs
Fatima Rama	Outside Back	Nova
Joana Lagona	Outside Back	Juggernauts
Magadaline Swaki	Outside Back	Tenkiles

== See also ==
- Papua New Guinea women's national rugby sevens team
- Oceania Rugby Women's Championship
