= Churchill Park, Lautoka =

Stadium in Fiji

Coordinates: 17°36′24″S 177°27′8″E

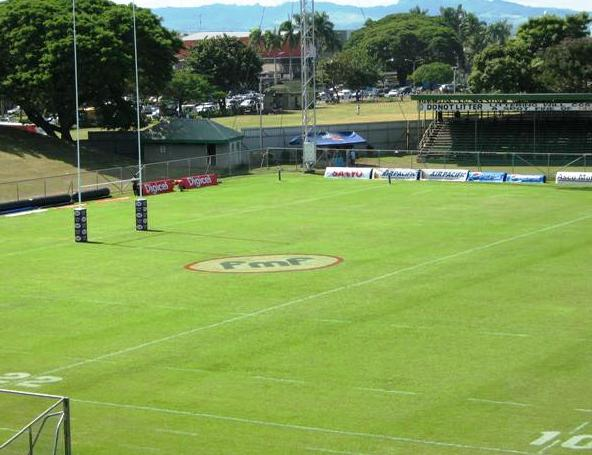
The town-end view of Churchill Park

Churchill Park is a multi-purpose stadium in Lautoka, Fiji. It is currently used mostly for football matches and hosts Lautoka F.C and the Fijian Drua.
