= Sunnybank Rugby =

Sunnybank
- Full name: Sunnybank Rugby Union Club
- Nickname: Dragons
- Founded: 1969; 57 years ago
- Location: Sunnybank, Brisbane, Queensland
- Region: Sunnybank, Southern Suburbs (Brisbane)
- Ground(s): Oldmac Oval, MacGregor, Brisbane
- Coach(es): Rob Roiri (Men's); Tui Nofoaiga (Women's)
- Captain(s): Zac Shepherd (Men's); Sera Koroi (Women's)
- League(s): Queensland Premier Rugby
- 2023 1st (Women's) 8th (Men's)
Team kit

Official website
- sunnybankrugby.com.au

Sunnybank Rugby Union Club is an Australian rugby union club based in the Brisbane suburb of Sunnybank, Queensland, currently competing in the Queensland Premier Rugby competition. It was established in 1969 and has won three premierships since it entered.

== History ==
Sunnybank Rugby Union Club was founded in 1969 as a junior rugby union club, in the southern Brisbane suburb of Sunnybank. As a junior club, it was founded on the principle that any boy, no matter how good or bad a rugby player he was, would get a game. And so it remains in the ranks of the junior players at Sunnybank, however the word "boy" has been changed to "child".

In its first year, the club fielded an Under 8s team coached by Bill Horsley and an Under 11s side coached by Graeme Page. The club played their home games at Sunnybank State High School, until 1974, when the club moved to its present home ground of Biggs Field in the nearby Brisbane suburb of Macgregor. The Sunnybank High School colours of black, green and white were adopted and the Chinese dragon adopted as the emblem of the new club.

The Dragons went from strength to strength, consistently being one of the strongest clubs in the Queensland Junior Rugby Union competition. The high point of this was claiming the President's Trophy for champion junior club in 1980.

In 1975, Sunnybank expanded from being solely a junior club, to being one with more senior players, with the introduction of an Under 19s side in that year. The club then proceeded to field its first Senior team in 1979, with a team playing in the Sub-Districts competition coached by former Souths Magpies prop David McNiven.

The club was finally promoted to First Grade status in 1989. Sunnybank had only to wait until 1993 before it made its first appearance in a First Grade Grand Final. The game was lost to Souths, but it signalled a dramatic change in the club's fortunes. Another First Grade Grand Final berth was secured the following year, but again they went down. However, in these two years, Sunnybank produced more than its fair share of representative players, especially in the Australian Under 19s side and the Australian Under 21s side. The mid-1990s saw a drop in Sunnybank's fortunes, with a large exodus of talented players.

=== Coming of age ===
However, the new millennium brought another high in Sunnybank's story. A major coup for SBRU was the signing of England Sevens Star Ben Gollings. In 2005, the Sunnybank First Grade team defeated the Gold Coast Breakers in the Hospital's Cup Grand Final, to claim the club's first senior top division championship. This performance was repeated in 2007, when once again the Dragons defeated the Breakers in the Premier Grade Grand Final at Ballymore, the spiritual home of Queensland Rugby. 2006 saw the opening of a new main oval and the opening of a new club house. Also the Premier grade team was knocked out in the semi-finals after losing their two props to wallaby commitments.

The 2007 season got off to a steady start with wingers Liam Bibo and Karel Bos impressing as with fullback and captain John Dart, towards the end the development of young fly-half Ben Lucas and the return of QLD Reds player Digby Ioanie, Rodney Blake, Greg Holmes, Henari Veratau and Nic Berry saw the Dragons develop impressive form in the lead up to the finals, culminating in an impressive 85–19 Grand Final victory over the Gold Coast, with Ben Lucas hauling a personal tally of 35 points. The club's players were also available for selection to the Australian Rugby Championship franchise East Coast Aces in 2007.

== Results ==
=== Premier Rugby ===
Premiers
| Year | Premiers | Score | Runners-up |
|---|---|---|---|
| 2005 | Sunnybank | 41–17 | Gold Coast |
| 2007 | Sunnybank | 85–19 | Gold Coast |
| 2011 | Sunnybank | 35–24 | Brothers |

Runners-up
| Year | Premiers | Score | Runners-up |
|---|---|---|---|
| 1993 | Souths | 27–8 | Sunnybank |
| 1994 | Souths | 19–8 | Sunnybank |
| 2012 | University | 46–20 | Sunnybank |
| 2014 | University | 20–18 | Sunnybank |

=== Australian Club Championship ===
Australian Club Championship
| Year | Premiers | Score | Runners-up |
|---|---|---|---|
| 2008 | Sydney University | 24–0 | Sunnybank |

== Honours ==
Queensland Premier Rugby – Premiers: (3) 2005, 2007, 2011
Queensland Premier Rugby – Runners-up: (4) 1993, 1994, 2012, 2014
Australian Club Championship – Runners-up: (1) 2008

== International players ==
- Paul Alo-Emile (2017)
- Greg Holmes (2005)
- Digby Ioane (2007)
- Rob Simmons (2010)
- Jake Schatz (2014)
- Liam Gill (2012)
- Richard Kingi (2009)
- Ben Tapuai (2011)
- Henry Taefu (2017)
- David Giffin (1996)
- Rodney Blake (2006)
- Nigel Ah Wong (2022)
- Josh Afu (2008)

== See also ==
- Queensland Premier Rugby
- Rugby union in Queensland
