= Fiji women's national rugby union team =

National sports team

Fiji
- Nickname: Fijiana
- Union: Fiji Rugby Union
- Head coach: Willie Walker
- Captain: Alfreda Fisher Maria
First colours	Second colours

World Rugby ranking
- Current: 13 (as of 22 September 2025)
- Highest: 13 (2025)
- Lowest: 32 (2007)

First international
- Fiji 15–27 Samoa (Nukuʻalofa, Tonga; 14 April 2006)

Biggest win
- Fiji 152–0 Papua New Guinea (Papakura, New Zealand; 9 July 2022)

Biggest defeat
- Fiji 19–84 England (Auckland, New Zealand; 8 October 2022)

World Cup
- Appearances: 2 (first in 2021)

Women's World Rugby Rankings Top 20 rankings as of 6 April 2026
Rank	Change*	Team	Points
1	Steady	England	98.09
2	Steady	Canada	91.53
3	Steady	New Zealand	89.85
4	Steady	France	83.60
5	Steady	Ireland	78.20
6	Steady	Scotland	77.39
7	Steady	Australia	75.46
8	Steady	United States	72.90
9	Steady	Italy	72.37
10	Steady	South Africa	71.62
11	Steady	Japan	69.72
12	Steady	Wales	66.13
13	Steady	Fiji	63.98
14	Steady	Spain	62.42
15	Steady	Samoa	59.72
16	Steady	Hong Kong	57.56
17	Steady	Netherlands	57.42
18	Steady	Russia	55.10
19	Steady	Kazakhstan	53.88
20	▲1	Germany	51.10
*Change from the previous week

The Fiji women's national rugby union team are a national sporting side of Fiji, representing them at rugby union. They played their first test against Samoa in 2006, and compete annually in the Oceania Rugby Women's Championship. In 2022, they created history when they scored the third-highest points in both Men's and Women's Rugby at the Oceania Championship when they trounced Papua New Guinea 152–0. They made their first Rugby World Cup appearance at the delayed tournament in New Zealand.

== History ==
Fiji played their first match in 1997 against a visiting United States XV's team. They played their first international test match against Samoa in the one-off Women's Pacific Tri-Nations in 2006.

Ten years after the Women's Pacific Tri-Nations, the Oceania Rugby Women's Championship was established. The first tournament was held in 2016 between Fiji and Papua New Guinea at the ANZ National Stadium in Suva. The tournament was also part of the 2017 Women's Rugby World Cup qualification process. Fiji beat Papua New Guinea 37–10 to win the inaugural Oceania Championship and progress to the next stage of qualifications.

Fiji met Hong Kong and Japan in a Repechage tournament, but lost both matches and did not qualify for the 2017 World Cup. In 2018, Fijiana won the second edition of the Oceania Championship and successfully defended their title after winning all their matches.

The 2019 Oceania Championship also served as a qualifier for the 2021 Rugby World Cup in New Zealand. It was also the first time that the Oceania region was granted a spot at the World Cup. New Zealand and Australia had already qualified from the previous World Cup, Fijiana won the remaining spot and qualified for their first World Cup.

Fiji played two test matches against Australia and Japan in 2022 at Brisbane. It would be their first test match against the Wallaroos and only their second time to meet Japan. Fiji won the 2022 Oceania Rugby Championship in New Zealand. They created history when they scored the third-highest points in both Men's and Women's Rugby at the 2022 Oceania Championships as they trounced Papua New Guinea 152–0 in Papakura, New Zealand.

=== First World Cup ===
In 2022, Fijiana were overwhelmed in their first Rugby World Cup match by England who ran in 14 tries and recorded an 84–19 victory. They later achieved their first World Cup win when they defeated South Africa 21–17. Their win against the Springbok Women moved them up five places to their highest ranking of 16th from 21st. France kept Fiji scoreless in their last World Cup match with a score of 44–0.

=== Second World Cup ===
Fiji qualified for their second Rugby World Cup after winning the 2024 Oceania Rugby Women's Championship.

== Records ==
=== Rugby World Cup ===
Rugby World Cup
Year	Round	GP	W	D	L	PF	PA
Fiji was not invited to any of the World Cups between 1991 and 2006
(England) 2010	Did not qualify						
(France) 2014	Did not qualify						
(Ireland) 2017	Did not qualify						
(New Zealand) 2021	Pool stage	3	1	0	2	40	149
(England) 2025	Pool stage	3	1	0	2	50	119
(Australia) 2029	TBD						
(United States) 2033	TBD						
Total	2/10	6	2	0	4	90	268
Champion Runner-up Third place Fourth place: * Tied placing ^{†} Best placing / Home venue

=== Overall ===
(Full internationals only, updated to 4 September 2026)

Rugby: Fiji internationals from 2006
Opponent	First game	Played	Won	Drawn	Lost	Win %
Australia	2022	5	0	0	5	0%
Canada	2022	3	0	0	3	0%
Colombia	2023	1	1	0	0	100%
England	2022	1	0	0	1	0%
France	2022	1	0	0	1	0%
Hong Kong	2016	3	1	0	2	33.33%
Japan	2016	5	2	0	3	40%
Kazakhstan	2022	1	1	0	0	100%
Netherlands	2024	1	0	0	1	0%
Papua New Guinea	2016	5	5	0	0	100%
Samoa	2006	10	6	0	4	60%
Scotland	2024	2	0	0	2	0%
South Africa	2022	3	1	0	2	33.33%
Spain	2023	2	0	0	2	0%
Tonga	2006	6	6	0	0	100%
United States	2025	1	0	0	1	0%
Wales	2025	1	1	0	0	100%
Summary	2006	50	24	0	26	48%

== Players ==
=== Current squad ===
Fiji announced their final squad on 9 August 2025 for the Women's Rugby World Cup in England.

Note: The age and number of caps listed for each player is as of 22 August 2025, the first day of the tournament.

Player	Position	Date of birth (age)	Caps	Club/province
Keleni Marawa	Hooker	1 January 1990 (aged 35)	21	(Fiji) Fijiana Drua
Selai Naliva	Hooker	2 July 2005 (aged 20)	1	
Vika Matarugu	Prop	2 August 1994 (aged 31)	19	(Fiji) Fijiana Drua
Tiana Robanakadavu	Prop	17 July 2005 (aged 20)	18	(Fiji) Fijiana Drua
Loraini Senivutu	Prop	23 January 2003 (aged 22)	13	(Fiji) Fijiana Drua
Bitila Tawake	Prop	2 April 1999 (aged 26)	23	(Fiji) Fijiana Drua
Bulou Wainikiti Vasuturaga	Prop	1 November 1991 (aged 33)	9	
Jade Coates	Second row	9 July 1998 (aged 27)	9	(New Zealand) Chiefs Manawa
Mereoni Nakesa	Second row	17 February 2003 (aged 22)	23	(Fiji) Fijiana Drua
Asinate Serevi	Second row	16 April 1995 (aged 30)	27	(Fiji) Fijiana Drua
Nunia Daunimoala	Back row	30 June 1999 (aged 26)	17	(Fiji) Fijiana Drua
Alfreda Fisher Maria (c)	Back row	9 May 2004 (aged 21)	8	(Fiji) Fijiana Drua
Karalaini Naisewa	Back row	23 July 1994 (aged 31)	28	(Fiji) Fijiana Drua
Adi Salaseini Railumu	Back row	20 November 2002 (aged 22)	4	(Fiji) Fijiana Drua
Sulita Waisega	Back row	16 March 2004 (aged 21)	24	
Carletta Yee	Back row	21 June 2007 (aged 18)	1	(Fiji) Fijiana Drua
Kolora Lomani	Scrum-half	22 July 1999 (aged 26)	17	(Fiji) Fijiana Drua
Salanieta Kinita	Fly-half	14 September 2001 (aged 23)	15	(Fiji) Fijiana Drua
Setaita Railumu	Fly-half	18 April 2001 (aged 24)	20	(Fiji) Fijiana Drua
Verenaisi Ditavutu	Centre	7 September 1999 (aged 25)	1	(Fiji) Fijiana 7s
Rusila Nagasau	Centre	4 August 1987 (aged 38)	12	(Fiji) Fijiana Drua
Alowesi Nakoci	Centre	18 August 1991 (aged 34)	7	(Fiji) Fijiana Drua
Ilisapeci Delaiwau	Wing	1 June 2000 (aged 25)	5	(Fiji) Fijiana 7s
Mere Vocevoce	Wing	4 April 2006 (aged 19)	0	(Fiji) Fijiana 7s
Ema Adivitaloga	Fullback	27 July 1994 (aged 31)	20	(Fiji) Fijiana Drua
Repeka Tove	Fullback	17 October 1998 (aged 26)	12	(Fiji) Fijiana Drua
Manuqalo Komaitai	Back	5 July 1996 (aged 29)	2	
Kelerayani Luvu	Back	7 November 2005 (aged 19)	0	(Fiji) Fijiana 7s
Adi Salote Nailolo	Back	13 June 2006 (aged 19)	1	
Josivini Neihamu	Back	29 January 2004 (aged 21)	3	(Fiji) Fijiana Drua
Michella'e Stolz	Back	11 August 2006 (aged 19)	2	
Litiana Vueti	Back	20 June 1998 (aged 27)	2	(Fiji) Fijiana Drua

=== Award winners ===
The following Fiji players have been recognised at the World Rugby Awards since 2001:

World Rugby Women's 15s Breakthrough Player of the Year
Year	Nominees	Winners
2022	Vitalina Naikore	—
2025	Josifini Neihamu	—

World Rugby Women's 15s Try of the Year
Year	Date	Nominee	Match	Tournament	Winner
2025	23 August	Kolora Lomani	vs. Canada	Rugby World Cup	—

== Coaches ==
Coach	Years	Refs
(Fiji) Seremaia Bai	2016	
(Fiji) Senirusi Seruvakula	2020–2022	
(Fiji) Inoke Male	2023	
(Fiji) Mosese Rauluni	2024	
(Wales) Ioan Cunningham	2025–2026	
Willie Walker	2026–	

== See also ==
- Fiji women's national rugby sevens team
