= Samoa women's national rugby union team =

Women's national rugby union team of Samoa

Samoa
- Nickname: Manusina Samoa
- Union: Rugby Samoa
- Head coach: Ramsey Tomokino
- Captain: Sui Pauaraisa
First colours	Second colours

World Rugby ranking
- Current: 15 (as of 22 September 2025)
- Highest: 13 (2003)
- Lowest: 18

First international
- Samoa 10–12 Japan (Apia, Samoa; 15 July 2000)

Biggest win
- Samoa 91–0 Papua New Guinea (Pukekohe, New Zealand; 13 July 2022)

Biggest defeat
- England 92–3 Samoa (Northampton, England; 30 August 2025)

World Cup
- Appearances: 4 (First in 2002)
- Best result: 9th (2002)

Women's World Rugby Rankings Top 20 rankings as of 2 November 2026
Rank	Change*	Team	Points
1	Steady	England	94.20
2	Steady	New Zealand	93.18
3	Steady	Canada	91.68
4	Steady	France	85.00
5	Steady	Ireland	78.29
6	Steady	United States	77.50
7	Steady	Australia	77.18
8	Steady	Italy	71.99
9	Steady	Scotland	71.25
10	Steady	South Africa	70.76
11	Steady	Wales	70.12
12	Steady	Fiji	66.65
13	Steady	Japan	65.00
14	Steady	Spain	63.22
15	Steady	Samoa	58.31
16	Steady	Netherlands	58.29
17	Steady	Hong Kong	55.72
18	Steady	Russia	55.10
19	Steady	Kazakhstan	53.95
20	Steady	Germany	51.12
*Change from the previous ranking update

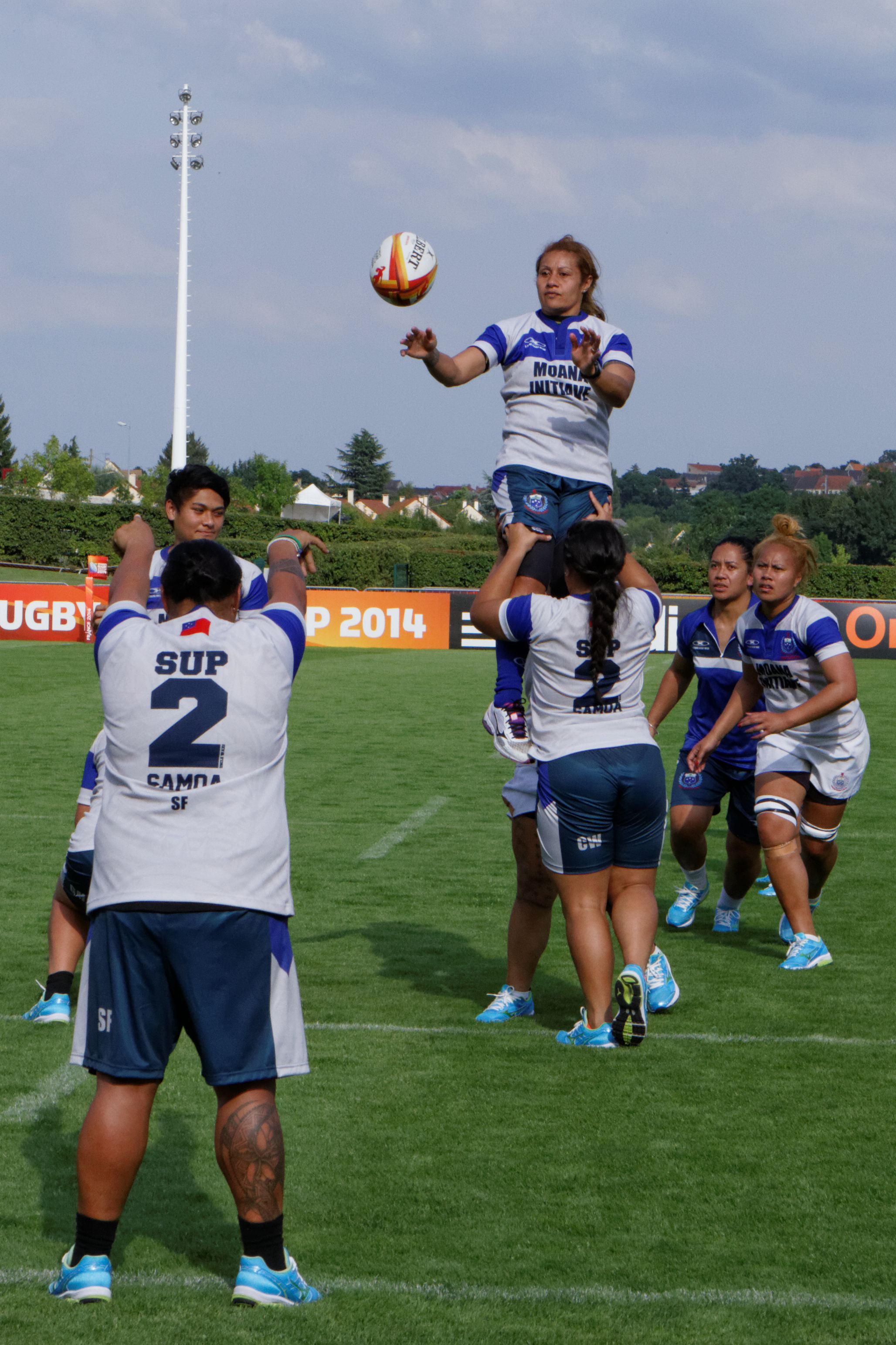
Samoa at the 2014 Women's Rugby World Cup

The Samoa women's national rugby union team (Samoan: ʻau lakapī tamaʻitaʻi o Sāmoa), nicknamed Manusina Sāmoa (Samoan: [manuˈsina ˈsaːmoa]), represents Samoa in international women's rugby union. The side first played in 2000, and have competed in three Women's Rugby World Cups since their debut in the 2002 tournament in Spain. In 2023, they claimed their first Oceania Rugby Women's Championship.

== History ==
Samoa has attended three Rugby World Cup's, namely the 2002, 2006 and 2014 Rugby World Cups.

Samoa won the 2019 Asia Pacific Championship in Fiji. In 2021, they were scheduled to play two test matches against Australia in July but the matches were canceled due to the COVID-19 pandemic.

Samoa and Hong Kong both withdrew from the Final Qualification Tournament in Dubai, for the 2021 Rugby World Cup, due to travel restrictions caused by COVID-19.

In 2023, the Manusina created history when they won their first Oceania title after beating Fiji. They have also confirmed their place in World Rugby's inaugural WXV tournament in the WXV 2 division.

== Record ==
=== Rugby World Cup ===
Rugby World Cup
Year	Round	Position	Pld	W	D	L	PF	PA	Squad
(Wales) 1991	Samoa was not invited to the Rugby World Cups between 1991 and 1998								
(Scotland) 1994	Samoa was not invited to the Rugby World Cups between 1991 and 1998								
(Netherlands) 1998	Samoa was not invited to the Rugby World Cups between 1991 and 1998								
(Spain) 2002	9th Place Playoff	9th	4	3	0	1	56	30	Squad
(Canada) 2006	9th Place Playoff	10th	5	2	0	3	80	84	Squad
(England) 2010	Did Not Qualify								
(France) 2014	11th Place Playoff	11th	3	0	0	3	15	148	Squad
(Ireland) 2017	Did Not Qualify								
(New Zealand) 2021	Withdrew due to COVID-19 pandemic								
(England) 2025	Pool Stage	—	3	0	0	3	3	225	Squad
(Australia) 2029	TBD								
(United States) 2033	TBD								
Total	4/10	9th^{†}	15	5	0	10	154	487	Squad
Champion Runner-up Third place Fourth place: * Tied placing ^{†} Best placing / Home venue

=== Overall ===
(Full internationals only, updated to 26 May 2023)

Samoa Internationals From 2000
Opponent	First Match	Played	Won	Drawn	Lost	For	Against	Win %
Australia	2009	1	0	0	1	0	87	0.00%
Canada	2014	1	0	0	1	7	42	0.00%
England	2005	2	0	0	2	3	118	0.00%
Fiji	2006	7	3	0	4	117	186	42.85%
Hong Kong	2019	1	1	0	0	34	15	100.00%
Ireland	2002	1	1	0	0	22	0	100.00%
Italy	2013	1	0	0	1	22	65	0.00%
Japan	2000	1	0	0	1	10	12	0.00%
Kazakhstan	2002	3	3	0	0	60	10	100.00%
Netherlands	2013	1	1	0	0	33	14	100.00%
New Zealand	2006	2	0	0	2	12	140	0.00%
PNG	2018	4	4	0	0	295	57	100.00%
Scotland	2002	1	0	0	1	3	13	0.00%
South Africa	2006	2	1	1	1	84	52	50.00%
Spain	2006	3	0	0	3	22	65	0.00%
Sweden	2013	1	1	0	0	29	0	100.00%
Tonga	2006	5	5	0	0	262	34	100.00%
United States	2023	1	0	0	1	26	36	0.00%
Wales	2002	1	1	0	0	17	14	100.00%
Summary	2000	40	21	1	17	1,057	960	52.5%

== Players ==
=== Current squad ===
Samoa named their final 32-player squad on 1 August for the 2025 Women's Rugby World Cup in England.

Note: The age and number of caps listed for each player is as of 22 August 2025, the first day of the tournament.

Player	Position	Date of birth (age)	Caps	Club/province
Avau Valentina Filimaua	Hooker	4 August 2003 (aged 22)	8	(New Zealand) Linwood RFC / Canterbury / (Samoa) (Tonga) Penina Pasifika
Cathy Ulu'ulumatafolau Leuta	Hooker	27 July 2001 (aged 24)	9	(New Zealand) Papatoetoe RFC / Counties Manukau / (Samoa) (Tonga) Penina Pasifika
Faith Nonutunu	Hooker	17 July 2005 (aged 20)	0	
Denise Aiolupotea	Prop	1 October 1998 (aged 26)	6	(New Zealand) MAC Rugby / Hawkes Bay / Hurricanes Poua
Glory Aiono Samuelu	Prop	16 March 2002 (aged 23)	7	
Tori Iosefo	Prop	23 August 1995 (aged 29)	5	(New Zealand) MAC Rugby / Hawkes Bay / (Samoa) (Tonga) Penina Pasifika
Ana Mamea	Prop	23 November 2001 (aged 23)	14	(New Zealand) Papatoetoe RFC / Counties Manukau / (Samoa) (Tonga) Penina Pasifika
Ti Tauasosi	Prop	6 November 1987 (aged 37)	10	(New Zealand) Marist Old Boys / Auckland / (Samoa) (Tonga) Penina Pasifika
Demielle Onesemo-Tuilaepa	Second row	7 September 2004 (aged 20)	0	(Samoa) (Tonga) Penina Pasifika
Ana-Lise Sio	Second row	3 January 1996 (aged 29)	8	(Australia) Tuggeranong Vikings
Jayjay Taylor	Second row	22 May 1997 (aged 28)	0	
Utumalama Atonio	Back row	7 November 1999 (aged 25)	15	(New Zealand) Papatoetoe RFC / Counties Manukau
Joanna Fanene-Lolo	Back row	11 November 1998 (aged 26)	3	(New Zealand) Marist Old Boys / Auckland
Nina Foaese	Back row	24 October 1988 (aged 36)	23	(New Zealand) Norths RFC / Wellington / (Samoa) (Tonga) Penina Pasifika
Christabelle Onesemo-Tuilaepa	Back row	7 September 2004 (aged 20)	1	(Samoa) (Tonga) Penina Pasifika
Sinead Ryder	Back row	19 December 1991 (aged 33)	6	
Sui Tauaua-Pauaraisa (c)	Back row	30 October 1987 (aged 36)	24	(New Zealand) Linwood RFC / Canterbury
Ana-Maria Afuie	Scrum-half	17 April 1997 (aged 28)	6	(Australia) Sunnybank RFC
Saelua Leaula	Scrum-half	17 July 1997 (aged 28)	15	
Faalua Tugaga	Scrum-half	22 December 2001 (aged 23)	7	
Drenna Falaniko	Centre	30 January 2004 (aged 21)	4	(New Zealand) Petone RFC / Wellington
Madisen-Jade Iva	Centre	10 October 2004 (aged 20)	0	
Davina Lasini	Centre	31 October 1996 (aged 28)	6	(Australia) Brothers Rugby Club
Fa'asua Makisi	Centre	16 March 1994 (aged 31)	2	(New Zealand) Oriental Rongotai / Wellington
Keilamarita Pouri-Lane	Centre	9 April 1996 (aged 29)	0	(Samoa) (Tonga) Penina Pasifika
Harmony Vatau	Centre	19 April 2004 (aged 21)	7	(Australia) Endeavour Hills / (Samoa) (Tonga) Penina Pasifika
Lutia Col Aumua	Wing	23 September 2003 (aged 21)	9	
Michelle Curry	Wing	4 September 1996 (aged 28)	8	
Linda Fiafia	Wing	9 August 1993 (aged 32)	13	
Taytana Pati Ah-Cheung	Fullback	12 July 2004 (aged 21)	2	
Melina Salale	Fullback	9 July 2002 (aged 23)	1	(Samoa) (Tonga) Penina Pasifika
Karla Wright-Akeli	Fullback	15 September 2001 (aged 23)	7	(New Zealand) Ponsonby Fillies / Auckland

== Coaches ==
Name	Years	Refs
Feturi Elisaia	2002	
Peter Fatialofa	2013	
Euini Lale Faumuina	2014–?	
Ramsey Tomokino	2018–Present	
