= List of Singapore women's national rugby union team matches =

The following is a list of Singapore women's national rugby union team matches.

== Overall ==
Singapore's overall international match record against all nations is as follows:

	Games Played	Won	Drawn	Lost	Win %
Total	30	7	2	21	23.33%

== Full internationals ==
=== Legend ===
Won	Lost	Draw

=== 2000s ===
Test	Date	Opponent	PF	PA	Venue	Event
1	17 November 2006	Hong Kong	0	12	Kunming	2006 Asia Championship
2	19 November 2006	Thailand	0	20	Kunming	2006 Asia Championship
3	2 November 2007	China	6	39	Kunming	2007 Asia Championship
4	4 November 2007	Japan	7	20	Kunming	2007 Asia Championship
5	3 June 2008	Kyrgyzstan	38	0	Taldykorgan, Kazakhstan	2008 Asia Championship
6	5 June 2008	Japan	10	17	Taldykorgan, Kazakhstan	2008 Asia Championship
7	7 June 2008	Uzbekistan	0	15	Taldykorgan, Kazakhstan	2008 Asia Championship
8	4 December 2008	Hong Kong	10	10	St Andrew's School, Singapore	
9	5 December 2008	Hong Kong	0	5	Yio Chu Kang Stadium, Singapore	
10	10 October 2009	Hong Kong	17	22	Hong Kong	
11	4 November 2009	Japan	11	35	Republic Polytechnic, Singapore	2010 RWC Qualifier
12	6 November 2009	Hong Kong	3	16	Padang, Singapore	2010 RWC Qualifier

=== 2010s ===
Test	Date	Opponent	PF	PA	Venue	Event
13	21 May 2011	Hong Kong	8	53	Hong Kong	
14	14 June 2012	Laos	74	0	Manila, Philippines	2012 Asia Development Cup
15	16 June 2012	Thailand	21	19	Manila, Philippines	2012 Asia Development Cup
16	12 December 2012	Hong Kong	21	45	Yio Chu Kang Stadium	
17	15 December 2012	Hong Kong	17	44	Yio Chu Kang Stadium	
18	27 April 2013	Hong Kong	0	29	Hong Kong	
19	4 September 2013	Kazakhstan	7	91	Almaty Central Stadium, Kazakhstan	2013 Asia Four Nations
20	7 September 2013	Hong Kong	17	15	Almaty Central Stadium, Kazakhstan	2013 Asia Four Nations
21	18 May 2014	Japan	5	37	Aberdeen Stadium, Hong Kong	2014 Asia Four Nations
22	21 May 2014	Kazakhstan	0	68	Aberdeen Stadium, Hong Kong	2014 Asia Four Nations
23	24 May 2014	Hong Kong	5	53	Aberdeen Stadium, Hong Kong	2014 Asia Four Nations
24	14 May 2016	Hong Kong	7	40	Singapore	
25	2 June 2018	India	30	5	Queenstown Stadium, Singapore	2018 Asia Championship Div 1
26	8 June 2018	Philippines	19	10	Queenstown Stadium, Singapore	2018 Asia Championship Div 1
27	19 June 2019	China	7	59	Southern Plains Sports Field, Calamba	2019 Asia Championship Div 1
28	22 June 2019	India	19	21	Southern Plains Sports Field, Calamba	2019 Asia Championship Div 1

=== 2020s ===
Test	Date	Opponent	PF	PA	Venue	Event
29	8 February 2026	Malaysia	15	15	Padang Astaka, Petaling Jaya	SEARF Women's Championship
30	11 February 2026	Philippines	78	0	Padang Astaka, Petaling Jaya	SEARF Women's Championship

== Other matches ==
Date	Singapore	Score	Opponent	Venue
5 September 2009	Singapore A	10–7	Malaysian Barbarians	Kuala Lumpur
3 October 2009	Singapore	63–0	Malaysia	Yio Chu Kang Stadium, Singapore
17 April 2010	Singapore A	5–10	Malaysia	Yio Chu Kang
