= List of Philippines women's national rugby union team matches =

The following is a list of the Philippines women's national rugby union team matches.

== Overall ==
	Games Played	Won	Drawn	Lost	Win %
Total	11	4	0	7	36.36%

Legend
Won	Lost	Draw

== 2011–19 ==
Test	Date	Opponent	PF	PA	Venue	Event	Ref
1	24 November 2011	China	0	36	Anouvong Stadium, Vientiane	2011 ARFU Div. 2	
2	25 November 2011	Thailand	0	39	Anouvong Stadium, Vientiane	2011 ARFU Div. 2	
3	26 November 2011	Laos	20	12	Anouvong Stadium, Vientiane	2011 ARFU Div. 2	
4	14 June 2012	Thailand	15	50	Eagle's Nest Stadium, Quezon City	2012 ARFU Div. 2	
5	16 June 2012	Laos	55	0	Eagle's Nest Stadium, Quezon City	2012 ARFU Div. 2	
6	5 June 2018	India	19	5	Queenstown Stadium, Queenstown	2018 ARWC Div 1	
7	8 June 2018	Singapore	10	19	Queenstown Stadium, Queenstown	2018 ARWC Div 1	
8	19 June 2019	India	32	27	Southern Plains Sports Field, Calamba	2019 ARWC Div 1	
9	22 June 2019	China	0	68	Southern Plains Sports Field, Calamba	2019 ARWC Div 1	

== 2026 ==
Test	Date	Opponent	PF	PA	Venue	Event	Ref
10	11 February 2026	Singapore	0	51	Padang Astaka, Petaling Jaya	SEARFC	
11	14 February 2026	Malaysia	0	78	Padang Astaka, Petaling Jaya	SEARFC	
