= Asia Rugby Women's Championship =

- Upcoming season or competition: 2026 Asia Rugby Women's Championship
- Sport: Rugby union
- Founded: 2006; 20 years ago
- Countries: Championship; Hong Kong; Japan; Kazakhstan; Division 1 China; India; Philippines; Singapore
- Confederation: Asia Rugby
- Most recent champion: Japan (2025)
- Most titles: Japan (7 titles)

The Asia Rugby Championship for women's national fifteen-a-side teams is a rugby union tournament that has been contested since 2006. Organised by Asia Rugby, there are currently two competition divisions — the Championship, and Division 1. The championship is also the continental qualifying tournament for Asian women's teams in the lead up to the Rugby World Cup, and the WXV.

== History ==
The Asia Rugby Women's Championship began in 2006, the first tournament was hosted by China in Kunming. Hosts, China, won the inaugural tournament and since then, Japan has won seven times, Kazakhstan five times, with China and Hong Kong winning one each.

Japan won their seventh Championship title in 2025.

== Format ==
The international test calendar was restructured to accommodate the upcoming WXV tournament. Asia Rugby announced that the Asia Rugby Women's Championship would now be played in two tiers as a pathway to the WXV tournament.

The top team in the Championship division will compete in WXV 2 as Asia 1, and the runner-up in WXV 3.

== Previous winners ==
=== All-time summary ===
Up to and including the 2024 edition, the following women's teams' Championship division top-3 finishes in tournaments:

| Rank | Team | Champion | Runner‑up | Third place | Total |
|---|---|---|---|---|---|
| 1 | Japan | 7 | 3 | 2 | 12 |
| 2 | Kazakhstan | 5 | 3 | 2 | 10 |
| 3 | Hong Kong | 1 | 7 | 4 | 12 |
| 4 | China | 1 | 1 | 0 | 2 |
| 5 | Thailand | 0 | 0 | 1 | 1 |
| 5 | Uzbekistan | 0 | 0 | 1 | 1 |
| Totals (6 entries) | | 14 | 14 | 10 | 38 |

=== Asia Rugby Championship ===
| Year | Edn | Host • Teams | | Final placings | | | |
|---|---|---|---|---|---|---|---|
| Asian Rugby Championship | | | | Winner | Runner-up | Third | Fourth |
| 2006 | I | Kunming | 4 | China | Hong Kong | Thailand | Singapore |
| 2007 | II | Kunming | 4 | Kazakhstan | China | Japan | Singapore |
| 2008 | III | Taraz | 6 | Kazakhstan | Japan | Uzbekistan | Singapore |
| 2010^{*} | IV | Tokyo | 2 | Japan | Hong Kong | —N/a | —N/a |
| Asian 4 Nations | | | | Winner | Runner-up | Third | Fourth |
| 2012 | V | Kunshan | 4 | Kazakhstan | Japan | Hong Kong | ^{^{‡}}China |
| 2013 | VI | Almaty | 4 | Kazakhstan | Japan | Hong Kong | ^{^{†}}China |
| 2014 | VII | Hong Kong | 4 | Kazakhstan | Hong Kong | Japan | ^{^{‡}}Singapore |
| Asia Rugby Championship | | | | Winner | Runner-up | Third | Fourth |
| 2015 | VIII | round-robin home or away | 3 | Japan | Kazakhstan | Hong Kong | —N/a |
| 2016 | IX | round-robin home or away | 3 | Japan | Hong Kong | —N/a | —N/a |
| 2017 | X | round-robin home or away | 2 | Japan | Hong Kong | —N/a | —N/a |
| 2021 | Cancelled due to the COVID-19 pandemic in Asia | | | | | | |
| 2022 | XI | Hong Kong | 2 | Hong Kong | Kazakhstan | —N/a | —N/a |
| 2023 | XII | Almaty | 3 | Japan | Kazakhstan | Hong Kong | —N/a |
| 2024 | XIII | Hong Kong | 3 | Japan | Hong Kong | Kazakhstan | —N/a |
| 2025 | XIV | Fukuoka | 3 | Japan | Hong Kong | Kazakhstan | —N/a |
| 2026 | XV | Almaty | 3 | Japan | Kazakhstan | Hong Kong | —N/a |

=== Division tournaments ===
| Year | Div | Host | Teams | Final placings | | | |
|---|---|---|---|---|---|---|---|
| ARC Divisions | | | | Winner | Runner-up | Third | Fourth |
| 2010^{a} | 2 | Sikuet | 3 | Laos | Philippines | Thailand | —N/a |
| 2011 | 2 | Vientiane | 4 | ^{^{§}}China | Thailand | Philippines | Laos |
| 2012 | 2 | Manila | 4 | ^{^{§}}Singapore | Thailand | Philippines | Laos |
| ARC Div 1 | | | | Winner | Runner-up | Third | Fourth |
| 2018 | 1 | Singapore | 3 | ^{^{§}}Singapore | Philippines | India | —N/a |
| 2019 | 1 | Calamba | 4 | ^{^{§}}China | Philippines | India | Singapore |

Notes:

^* Some sources suggest that the match in Tokyo was for the 2010 ARFU Division 1 XV Championship.

^^{†} Relegated to the division below.

^^{‡} Able to be challenged by the winner of the division below to play in a promotion-relegation play-off.

^^{§} Won promotion, or the right to a challenge play-off for promotion, to the division above.

^a Development tournament organised by ARFU in 2010. The games were 40 minutes long and were not test matches.

=== Asia Pacific Championship ===
| Year | Host | Teams | Final placings | | |
| Year | Host | Teams | Winner | Runner-up | Third |
|---|---|---|---|---|---|
| 2016 | Hong Kong | 3 | Japan | Hong Kong | Fiji |
| 2019 | Lautoka, Fiji | 3 | Samoa | Hong Kong | Fiji |

== See also ==
- Women's international rugby union
- Asia Rugby Championship (for men)
