= List of China women's national rugby union team matches =

The following is a list of China women's national rugby union team international matches.

== Overall ==
China's overall international match record against all nations, updated to, is as follows:

	Games Played	Won	Drawn	Lost	Percentage of wins
Total	13	9	0	4	69.23%

== Full Internationals ==
=== Legend ===
Won	Lost	Draw

=== 2000s ===
Test	Date	Opponent	PF	PA	Venue	Tournament
1	2006-11-17	Thailand	53	11	Kunming, China	2006 ARFU
2	2006-11-19	Hong Kong	31	7	Kunming, China	2006 ARFU
3	2007-11-02	Singapore	39	6	Kunming, China	2007 ARFU
4	2007-11-04	Kazakhstan	5	34	Kunming, China	2007 ARFU

=== 2010s ===
Test	Date	Opponent	PF	PA	Venue	Tournament
5	2011-11-24	Philippines	36	0	Chao Anou Vong stadium, Laos	2011 ARFU
6	2011-11-25	Laos	66	0	Chao Anou Vong stadium, Laos	2011 ARFU
7	2011-11-26	Thailand	38	0	Chao Anou Vong stadium, Laos	2011 ARFU
8	2012-07-05	Kazakhstan	0	51	Kunshan, China	2012 Asia 4 Nations
9	2012-07-0	Hong Kong	3	27	Kunshan, China	2012 Asia 4 Nations
10	2019-06-19	Singapore	59	7	Southern Plains Sports Field, Calamba	2019 ARC Div. 1
11	2019-06-22	Philippines	68	0	Southern Plains Sports Field, Calamba	2019 ARC Div. 1
12	2019-07-31	Kazakhstan	13	8	Jiujiang Stadium	2019 ARC Div. 1
13	2019-08-03	Kazakhstan	0	15	Jiujiang Stadium	2019 ARC Div. 1
