= List of women's international rugby union matches without test status =

The following is a list of women's international rugby union matches with non-test status.

The list includes:

- Matches involving designated national "A" teams,
- Matches of doubtful status,
- Matches between full international sides and non-national XVs, and
- Other games of note.

It is included as some nations have awarded full caps for these games and may include them as full internationals in their own records. In addition these games act as an indicator of the relative strength of some of the smaller nations, and the strength in depth of the larger.

== 1990 ==
21 October 1990

Catalonia	4-0	Wales XV

Barcelona

== 1991 ==
13 April 1991

France	3-0	A New Zealand XV

Cardiff

== 1995 ==
6 May 1995

Germany	3-75	Catalonia

Rottweil

== 1996 ==
1996-??-??

France A	0-32	Basque Country

??

== 1997 ==
4 August 1997

Fiji	19-24	A USA XV

Suva

== 2000 ==
31 March 2000

Catalonia	21-50	Italy

Aubagne, France

2 April 2000

France A	22-11	Italy

Marseille

== 2001 ==
18 March 2001

France A	39-0	Netherlands

20 November 2001

Wales A	0-29	United States

Swansea

== 2002 ==
19 January 2002

Spain	5-10	England A

Cornella

21 January 2002

Ireland Select XV	5-23	England Academy

Waterford

3 February 2002

Scotland Students	8-38	England Students

Dunbar

16 February 2002

Netherlands	5-53	France A

Amsterdam

16 February 2002

Wales A	0-53	England A

Bridgend

2 March 2002

England Academy	5-0	Netherlands

Staines

3 March 2002

England Students	15-5	Wales Development

Coventry

24 March 2002

England A	79-0	Wales A

London Welsh

13 April 2002

England Students	15-34	(United Kingdom) British Police Women's XV

Chester

14 April 2002

England Academy	35-0	Wales A

Chester

14 April 2002

England U18	12-7	Wales U19

Chester

== 2003 ==
5 January 2003

England Academy	0-7	USA U23

Broadstreet, Coventry

10 January 2003

England Students	12-25	USA U23

King Henry VIII School, Coventry

12 January 2003

England Academy	18-10	USA U23

Loughborough University

1 February 2003

Spain	0-34	England A

Cornellà

20 February 2003

Canada U19	3-5	Wales U19

Florida

22 February 2003

USA U19	3-13	Wales U19

Florida

22 February 2003

France A	46-5	Netherlands

8 March 2003

England A	15-15	Nomads

Newbury

23 March 2003

Wales U19	0-66	England U19

Caerphilly

23 March 2003

Wales A	22-12	England Academy

Caerphilly

23 March 2003

England Students	38-5	Scotland Students

St Mary's University

29 March 2003

France A	5-25	Wales A

Paris

29 March 2003

Netherlands	15-14	England Devp.

Amsterdam

25 April 2003

England Students	27-0	(United Kingdom) British Police Women's XV

Imber Court

27 April 2003

England U19	27-0	Wales U19

Coventry

3 May 2003

Denmark	0-37	Sweden A

Copenhagen

31 May 2003

Blue Bulls	8–37	England Development

Loftus Versfeld, Pretoria

6 June 2003

Sharks	0-95	England Development

Natal University

31 May 2003

South Africa President's XV	0-45	England Development

Pongola

25 October 2003

Wales	15-20	Nomads

Memorial Ground

1 November 2003

Denmark	17-0	Norwegian Barbarians

Copenhagen

2 November 2003

Sweden	27-5	Norwegian Barbarians

Copenhagen

== 2004 ==
11 January 2004

Ireland Development	10-0	England Academy

Limerick

31 January 2004

England A	35-5	Spain

Imber Court

6 February 2004

Belgium	0-56	Netherlands B

Ghent

15 February 2004

England Students	5-15	Wales Development

University of Warwick

22 February 2004

England Devp.	15-5	Netherlands

Newbury

22 February 2004

England A	18-5	Nomads

Newbury

5 March 2004

England A	21-17	Nomads

Newbury

5 March 2004

England A	29-7	British Army Women's XV

Newbury

5 March 2004

Wales A	5-8	France A

Llanrumney

7 March 2004

Scotland U23	0-69	England U23

Edinburgh

21 March 2004

Wales U19	13-12	England U19

Taffs Well

27 March 2004

France A	14-32	England A

Bourg-en-Bresse

27 March 2004

Scotland Students	0-45	England Students

Edinburgh

9 April 2004

Sweden U19	5-0	Wales U19

Leicester

11 April 2004

England Students	27-7	Sweden

Syston

16 April 2004

England Students	19-24	(United Kingdom) British Police Women's XV

Blaydon

25 April 2004

England U19	19-3	Wales U19

Broadstreet, Coventry

25 April 2004

England Academy	81-0	Wales A

Broadstreet, Coventry

25 June 2004

Wales U19	19-8	USA U19

Henley

26 June 2004

England U19	44-13	USA U19

Henley

2 July 2004

Canada U19	0-48	England U19

Pill Harriers, Wales

3 July 2004

Wales U19	19-8	Canada U19

Pill Harriers

27 November 2004

Wales	15-5	Nomads

University of Glamorgan

4 December 2004

Uganda XV	183-0	Rwanda XV

Kampala

8 December 2004

England A	50-17	Wales

Clifton

== 2005 ==
9 January 2005

Ireland	25-19	England Academy

St Mary's RFC, Dublin

4 February 2005

England Students	0-19	British Army Women's XV

Aldershot

6 February 2005

Netherlands	19-36	England Academy

Amsterdam

12 February 2005

England A	29-6	France A

Imber Court

13 February 2005

England Students	15-5	Scotland U23

Huddersfield

16 February 2005

Netherlands Development	0-5	Belgium

Visé

19 February 2005

Canada U19	18-0	Wales U19

Vancouver Island

22 February 2005

Canada U19	27-12	Wales U19

Vancouver Island

26 February 2005

England A	10-15	Nomads

Newbury

26 February 2005

Netherlands	17-12	France A

Amsterdam

27 February 2005

England U19	5-5	Wales U19

Coventry

5 March 2005

Combined Services (United Kingdom)	7-22	Netherlands

Portsmouth

13 March 2005

England Students	48-0	Wales Students

University of Warwick

15 March 2005

England A	19-14	Nomads

Imber Court

20 March 2005

Wales U19	5-3	England Academy

Birchgrove, Swansea

20 March 2005

Wales A	0-48	England Academy

Birchgrove, Swansea

1 April 2005

England Junior Select	26-17	(United Kingdom) British Police Women's XV

Fairfield, Merseyside

26 April 2005

Wales A	10-17	South Africa

UWIC, Cardiff

28 April 2005

British Army Women's XV	8-24	New Zealand Army

Aldershot

3 May 2005

England Students	5-31	South Africa

Aylesbury

7 May 2005

England A	42-12	South Africa

Old Albanians, St Albans

10 May 2005

England Academy	25-19	South Africa

Old Albanians, St Albans

8 July 2005

Canadian Barbarians	0-35	Scotland

Ottawa(?)

13 August 2005

Ugandan Select XV	58-0	Kenyan Barbarians

Kampala

19 October 2005

New Zealand Select	8-40	England Select

North Harbour Stadium, Auckland

15 November 2005

Combined Services (United Kingdom)	15-28	Netherlands

Newbury

19 November 2005

Nomads	5-0	Wales

Saracens RFC, Southgate

== 2006 ==
29 January 2006

England A	8-21	United States

Imber Court

5 February 2006

England Students	46-5	Wales A

RAF Halton, Aylesbury

11 February 2006

Netherlands	27-0	Wales A

Amsterdam

12 February 2006

England A	17-10	Italy

Imber Court

26 February 2006

England A	29-5	Nomads

Henley

26 February 2006

Netherlands	13-0	England Students

RAF Halton

2 March 2006

Canada U19	5-27	England U19

Cowichan RFC, Vancouver Island

5 March 2006

Canada U19	20-13	England U19

Shawnigan Lake School, Vancouver Island

18 March 2006

England A	24-0	Nomads

Old Albanians

18 March 2006

France A	47-7	Netherlands

Metz

25 March 2006

Belgium	13-0	Netherlands B

Brussels

14 April 2006

England Select XV	35-5	Sweden

RAF Halton

16 April 2006

England Student XV	15-10	Sweden

RAF Halton

2 May 2006

Wales A	7-66	Canada

UWIC, Cardiff

6 May 2006

England Student XV	12-14	(United Kingdom) British Police Women's XV

Imber Court

20 June 2006

Irish Barbarians	3-33	Netherlands B

Durban

June 2006

South Africa A	5-3	Irish Barbarians

Durban

13 August 2006

Scotland A	6-17	Ireland

Hawick

== 2007 ==
7 January 2007

Wales	12-19	Nomads

Taff's Well

11 February 2007

Netherlands	5-29	France A

Purmerend

11 March 2007

England A	21-7	France A

Old Albanians, St Albans

16 March 2007

England A	15-17	Nomads

Clifton

25 March 2007

England U19	31-7	USA U19

RAF Halton, Aylesbury

30 March 2007

Wales U19	15-14	USA U19

Rumney

4 April 2007

England U19	29-5	Canada U19

RAF Halton, Aylesbury

8 April 2007

England U19	43-0	Canada U19

RAF Halton, Aylesbury

11 April 2007

Wales U19	13-20	Canada U19

Taffs Well

12 August 2007

Nomads	24-0	United States

Clifton

24 June 2007

Austria/Croatia	17-7	Hungary/ Bavaria

Grossmugl, Austria

28 October 2007

Germany A	63-0	Luxembourg A

Heidelberg

1 December 2007

Korea University	5-20	Hong Kong

Seoul

2 December 2007

Korea University Development	0-61	Hong Kong

Seoul

12 December 2007

England A	34-17	United States

London Irish

== 2008 ==
2 February 2008

England A	12-27	Nomads

London Irish

3 February 2008

Wales U20	0-31	England U20

Taffs Well

9 February 2008

Spain	5-22	England A

Madrid

10 February 2008

France A	37-7	Netherlands

St Gratien

23 February 2008

France A	0-3	England A

Bergerac, Agen

15 March 2008

England A	15-24	Nomads

London Irish

26 March 2010

England U20	43-0	Wales U20

Heythrop Park

23 May 2008

New Zealand Army	8-10	British Army Women's XV

Linton

21 June 2008

South Africa U20	23-12	United States U20

Nelspruit

28 June 2008

South Africa U20	17-21	United States U20

Nelspruit

9 August 2008

South Africa	34-40	Nomads

Ellis Park

16 August 2008

South Africa	0-29	Nomads

Newlands

9 November 2008

Belgium	5-0	(Flanders) Flandre

Brussels?

12 December 2008

England Development	20-10	Emerging Italy

London Welsh

14 December 2008

England A	20-0	Emerging Italy

Old Deer Park

20 December 2008

Ireland President's XV	8-19	England

St Mary's RFC, Dublin

== 2009 ==
10 January 2009

Nomads	cancelled	Wales XV

London Wasps

7 February 2009

England A	29-0	Spain

London Welsh

15 February 2009

France A	61-0	Scotland Development

Arras

28 February 2009

England A	7-14	Nomads

Esher

28 February 2009

Netherlands	0-42	France A

Amsterdam

15 March 2009

England A	38-5	France A

London Welsh

21 March 2009

England A	15-17	Nomads

London Welsh

12 April 2009

Welsh Invitational XV	13-15	Sweden

Sardis Road, Pontypridd

12 April 2009

British Lionesses	92-0	(United Kingdom) British Services

Bournemouth

16 April 2009

Wales U20	8-26	England U20

Eirias Stadium, Colwyn Bay

21 April 2009

Netherlands	24-10	Catalonia

RC Waterland

22 May 2009

Sweden A	16-19	Finland

Södertälje

25 May 2009

Laos	15-5	Cambodia

Phnom Penh

23 June 2009

USA Development	7-10	Canada Development

Infinity Park, Glendale, Colorado

5 September 2009

Malaysian Barbarians	7-10	Singapore A

Kuala Lumpur

8 November 2009

Czech Republic	40-0	Eastern Germany

Tatry Smíchov, Prague

17 November 2009

England A	3-48	New Zealand

London

20 December 2009

An Ireland XV	30-0	A Scotland XV

Belfast Harlequins

== 2010 ==
16 January 2010

Nomads	cancelled	Wales

Saracens RFC, Southgate, London

16 January 2010

USA U20	12-13	Canada U20

Lakeland, Florida

30 January 2012

Scotland A	10-7	British Army Women's XV

Lasswade

6 February 2010

Scotland A	3-26	France A

Lasswade

7 February 2010

England A	12-10	Nomads

Esher

14 February 2010

Spain	5-10	England A

Gijón

14 February 2010

France A	37-3	Netherlands

Fécamp

25 February 2010

Netherlands	26-0	British Army Women's XV

Amsterdam

13 March 2010

England A	26-7	Nomads

Esher

14 March 2010

Catalonia	12-17	Basque Country

Lleida

19 March 2010

France A	20-0	England A

Rennes

20 March 2010

France U20	36-22	England U20

Sainte Nazaire

17 April 2010

Singapore A	5-10	Malaysia

Yio Chu Kang

20 April 2010

England U20	17-7	Wales U20

Surrey Sports Park, Guildford

9 June 2010

Wales U20	12-7	England U20

Taffs Well

18 July 2010

Scotland XV	20-15	Ireland XV

Lasswade

1 August 2010

Wales XV	15-13	Ireland XV

Bridgend

15 August 2008

Caribbean Select XV (Caribbean Community)	0-43	Canada U20

Nassau, Bahamas

17 August 2008

Caribbean Select XV (Caribbean Community)	7-30	United States U20

Nassau, Bahamas

16 October 2010

Stockholm Region	21-19	Finland

Stockholm

17 October 2010

Laos	12-5	Thailand

Sikuet, Laos

17 October 2010

Thailand	0-5	Philippines

Sikuet, Laos

17 October 2010

Laos	5-5	Philippines

Sikuet, Laos

5 December 2010

Basque Country	15-22	Catalonia

Durango, Biscay

== 2011 ==
29 January 2011

British Army Women's XV	0-17	Scotland A

Gosforth

23 February 2011

England A	19-22	Nomads

Esher

27 February 2011

England U20	12-5	France U20

Worcester

12 March 2011

England U20	77-0	Scotland U20

Gosforth

19 March 2011

England A	34-7	Spain

Surrey Sports Park, Guildford

16 April 2011

Netherlands	7-29	British Army Women's XV

Amsterdam

23 April 2011

Sweden	48-7	Finland

Stockholm

27 April 2011

England U20	32-19	Wales U20

Hartpury College, Gloucester

28 July 2011

USA Colleges	3-19	Canadian Universities

Saranac Lake, New York

31 July 2011

USA Colleges	23-21	Canadian Universities

Boulder, Colorado

2 November 2011

France XV	14-5	England XV

Stade Jean-Bouin, Marseille

14 December 2011

Singapore Select	0-46	Hong Kong

UWC East Campus, Singapore

17 December 2011

Singapore Select	0-34	Hong Kong

UWC East Campus, Singapore

== 2012 ==
7 January 2012

Scotland	24-6	British Army Women's XV

Murrayfield

5 February 2012

Portugal	16-7	Galicia

Estádio Universitário de Lisboa

11 March 2012

France U20	50-0	England U20

Stade Suzanne Lenglen, Paris

17 March 2012

German XV	21-14	Belgium

Offenbach am Main, Frankfurt

4 April 2012

England U20	5-11	France U20

Moulton College

7 April 2012

England U20	3-13	France U20

Moulton College

5 June 2012

Philippine Development	5-19	Singapore Academy

Manila, Philippines

23 June 2012

South Africa	28-17	Nomads

Cape Town

30 June 2012

South Africa	17-15	Nomads

Goodwood RFC, Cape Town

15 December 2012

Burundi	5-12	Rwanda

Bujumbura

== 2013 ==
5 January 2013

Wales XV	7-0	Spain

National Centre of Excellence, Cardiff

18 January 2013

Scotland	10-5	British Army Women's XV

Saughton Park, Edinburgh

20 January 2013

Ireland XV	39-7	Spain

Ashbourne

2 February 2013

France Defence	13-14	Belgium

Stade Porchefontaine, Versailles

16 February 2013

Rwanda	32-0	Burundi

Nyanza Stadium

23 February 2013

Spain	29-19	Nomads

Gijon

23 February 2013

Scotland U20	17-7	Finland

Lasswade

23 February 2013

England U20	5-17	France U20

Esher

9 March 2013

Belgium	51-0	German XV

Royal Kituro RC, Brussels

15 March 2013

France U20	15-3	England U20

Dijon

== 2014 ==
18 January 2013

British Army Women's XV	cancelled	Scotland

28 June 2014

Nomads	5-20	South Africa

Teddington, Middlesex

2 July 2014

England	48-0	United States

Surrey Sports Park

1 July 2014

Nomads	24-32	South Africa

WASPS London

5 July 2014

Spain	20-36	Ireland XV

Valladolid, Castile and León

6 July 2014

England XV	17-13	United States

Surrey Sports Park

20 July 2014

Ireland XV	27-7	Wales

Estuary Road, Malahide, Dublin, Ireland

== 2015 ==
3 January 2015

Scotland	10-43	Nomads

Murrayfield, Edinburgh

25 January 2015

Ireland	31-12	Wales

Ashbourne RFC, Ashbourne, County Meath

7 February 2015

France U20	46-0	Belgium

Centre national du rugby, Marcoussis, Essonne

15 February 2015

Scotland U20	32-7	British Army Women's XV

Meggetland Sports Complex, Edinburgh

17 February 2015

British Army Women's XV	10-25	England U20

Aldershot Military Stadium, Aldershot, Hampshire

28 February 2015

France U20	25-0	England U20

Stade Sainte-Germaine, Bordeaux, Gironde

1 March 2015

Scotland U20	cancelled	Czech Republic U20

14 March 2015

French Army Women's rugby team	28-45	Belgium

Lille

20 March 2015

Northumbria University	0-34	Scotland U20

Newcastle, Tyne and Wear

21 March 2015

England U20	5-10	France U20

Molesey Road, Esher, Surrey

18 April 2015

Switzerland	0-41	French Army Women's rugby team

Stade Philippe Pottier, Monthey, Valais

19 August 2015

United States U20	38-22	Canada U20

CWU Athletics Complex, Ellensburg, Washington

22 August 2015

United States U20	32-5	Canada U20

CWU Athletics Complex, Ellensburg, Washington

30 August 2015

Germany XV	47-13	Switzerland XV

Museumsplatz an der Tiergartenstraße, Heidelberg

3 October 2015

Belgium	21-38	British Army Women's XV

Passendale, West Flanders

18 October 2015

Scotland	88-20	(United Kingdom) Combined Services

Murrayfield, Edinburgh

1 December 2015

England A	37-29	Canada A

Molesey Road, Hersham, Surrey

5 December 2015

England A	22-19	Canada A

Molesey Road, Hersham, Surrey

15 December 2015

Spain XV	59-12	Hong Kong XV

Campo Juan Pablo II, Hortaleza, Madrid

== 2016 ==
24 January 2016

Wales XV	15–5	Ireland XV

Centre for Sporting Excellence, Ystrad Mynach

6 February 2016

Basque Country	5–42	France U20

Hernani

18 February 2016

Scotland U20	25–5	(United Kingdom) RAF

Stirling

18 February 2016

British Army Women's XV	12–41	England U20

Aldershot Military Stadium, Aldershot, Hampshire

5 March 2016

England U20	25–25	France U20

Esher

18 March 2016

France U20	24–12	England U20

Chartres

20 March 2016

Belgium	65–5	Scotland U20

Watermael-Boitsfort

24 March 2016

Singapore Development	7–14	Hong Kong U18

Singapore

27 March 2016

Singapore Development	12–5	Hong Kong U18

Singapore

28 March 2016

Switzerland	20–15	Brown University

Unteraegeri

30 March 2016

Czech Republic	17–12	Brown University

Prague

5 April 2016

England TDG U18	41–17	Canada U18

Bicton College, Devon

9 April 2016

England TDG U18	17–12	Canada U18

Bicton College, Devon

5 July 2016

USA WCAA	10–15	Canada Maple Leafs

Salt Lake City

9 July 2016

USA WCAA	13–45	Canada Maple Leafs

Salt Lake City

18 August 2016

England U20	46–8	Canada U20

Nottingham Trent College

22 August 2016

England U20	39–12	Canada U20

Nottingham Trent College

26 August 2016

England U20	34–12	Canada U20

Nottingham Trent College

3 September 2016

Netherlands	17–12	British Army Women's XV

Amsterdam

10 September 2016

Basque Country	0-116	Spain

Gamarra, Vitoria-Gasteiz

10 September 2016

Switzerland	44–0	(United Kingdom) British Police

Geneve

18 October 2016

Auckland	19–21	Australia

Bell Park, Pakuranga

29 October 2016

Wales XV	15–0	Scotland XV

Cardiff Arms Park

11 November 2016

Wales	43–5	British Army Women's XV

Cardiff Arms Park

16 November 2016

Hong Kong XV	25–22	Kazakhstan XV

King's Park, Hong Kong

20 November 2016

Hong Kong XV	37–10	Kazakhstan XV

King's Park, Hong Kong

== 2017 ==
14 January 2017

Spain XV	0–39	Wales XV

El Pantano, Villajoyosa

21 January 2017

Germany	25–29	British Army Women's XV

Museumsplatz an der Tiergartenstraße, Heidelberg

22 January 2017

Ireland XV	14–22	Wales XV

Donnybrook

11 March 2017

Spain XV	cancelled	England A

25 March 2017

División de Honor All-Star	7–53	Spain XV

Valle del Arcipreste, Majadahonda

27 May 2017

Botswana Vultures	17-10	Zimbabwe Sables

Gaborone

30 May 2017

Spain XV	19-8	Hong Kong XV

Estadio Pepe Rojo, Valladolid

3 June 2017

Zimbabwe Sables	39–0	Zambia XV

Police Ground, Harare

3 June 2017

Ireland XV	24–22	Japan XV

Dublin

7 June 2017

Ireland XV	24–15	Japan XV

Dublin

22 July 2017

England A	7–15	Spain XV

Brunel University London

1 August 2017

Canada U18	58-12	United States U18

Ottawa

3 August 2017

Canada U20	45-24	United States U20

Ottawa

5 August 2017

Canada U18	25-5	United States U18

Ottawa

7 August 2017

Canada U20	50-12	United States U20

Ottawa

14 October 2017

British Army Women's XV	5–27	South Africa

Aldershot

18 October 2017

England Academy	47–12	South Africa

Aldershot

21 October 2017

Czech Republic	17–27	French Army Women's rugby team

Stadion Markéta, Prague

22 October 2017

England Academy	12–15	South Africa

Aldershot

5 November 2017

Spain XV	5–24	Scotland XV

Estadio Valle del Arcipreste, Majadahonda

8 November 2017

Wales	39–22	British Army Women's XV

Cardiff Arms Park

10 November 2017

Munster Women's XV	0–19	Barbarians

Thomond Park, Limerick

11 November 2017

Spain XV	0–97	France XV

Estadio Pedro Escartín, Guadalajara

17 November 2017

British Police Women's XV (United Kingdom)	5-57	Sweden XV

Imber Court

18 November 2017

Scotland XV	22–15	Wales XV

Oriam Performance Centre, Currie

19 November 2017

Belgium XV	17–39	Netherlands Lions

Boitsfort

6 December 2017

Germany	6–51	British Army Women's XV

Heidelberg

== Sources of results ==
The above results have been traced mainly via the following listings of national and tournament results - most being national RFUs. Other results have been traced via numerous news reports.

- Australia (complete, some errors in dates)
- England (1998-)
- FIRA European Championships (2003-)
- France (1982-2004)
- France (1990-)
- Germany (rather incomplete)
- International Rugby Board (2006-, Six Nations and World Cup only)
- Japan (1994-2002)
- Netherlands (2003-)
- Norway (2002-)
- New Zealand (1991- )
- RBS Six Nations (2004-)
- Sweden (1984-2005)
- USA (complete, some errors)
- Wales (1987-, some gaps, some errors)
