= Women's Rugby World Cup =

International rugby union for women

Rugby World Cup
- Most recent tournament 2025 Women's Rugby World Cup
- Rugby World Cup logo
- Sport: Women's rugby union
- Instituted: 6 April 1991; 35 years ago
- Number of teams: 12; 1991 — 1994 & 2006 — 2021; 16; 1998 — 2002 & 2025
- Regions: Worldwide (World Rugby)
- Holders: England (3rd title)
- Most titles: New Zealand (6 titles)
- Website: rugbyworldcup.com

The Women's Rugby World Cup is the women's rugby union world championship which is organised by World Rugby. The first Rugby World Cup for women was held in 1991, but it was not until the 1998 tournament that the tournament received official backing from the International Rugby Board (IRB, now World Rugby); by 2009, the IRB had retroactively recognized the 1991 and 1994 tournaments and their champions.

Normally, the tournament is held every four years; it was moved forward in 2017 so that the competition could be held in the year before the Commonwealth Games. The 2021 tournament was postponed to 2022 due to the COVID-19 pandemic, but still marketed as the 2021 tournament.

Three countries have won the Women's Rugby World Cup since its establishment, with New Zealand having won the tournament a record six times followed by England with three titles and the United States with the single title in 1991.

== History ==
=== 1990s ===
Before the first Women's Rugby World Cup officially sanctioned by the International Rugby Board there had been three previous tournaments of a similar nature. The first of these was an event held in August 1990 in New Zealand. Though not considered a world cup, the tournament was referred to as the World Rugby Festival for Women. The competition included teams representing the United States, the Netherlands, Russia, and the hosts, New Zealand – who emerged as winners after defeating the United States in the final.

The first tournament referred to as the Women's Rugby World Cup was held in 1991 and hosted by Wales. Twelve countries were divided into four groups of three. The United States, against expectations, took the first championship with a 19–6 victory over England. In the Plate competition Canada prevailed over Spain 18–4. Following the first tournament, it was decided to move the tournament schedule to the year prior to the next men's world cup, therefore reducing the quadrennial cycle to just three years.

The next event was originally scheduled to take place in Amsterdam but ended up being moved to Scotland. Eleven countries competed in the tournament with the English meeting the United States in the final for the second time; however, in this instance England emerged as winners.

The 1998 tournament became the first women's world cup officially sanctioned by the International Rugby Board. Amsterdam, who were originally scheduled to host the previous world cup, hosted the largest ever tournament with all matches played at the new National Rugby Centre in the city's west end. The tournament also saw a record sixteen teams compete. New Zealand, who withdrew from the previous tournament, also competed. The final saw New Zealand defeat the United States and claim their first world cup title.

=== 2000–present ===
The next event was taken to Spain in 2002. New Zealand won the title for the second time by defeating England 19–9 in the final.

The 2006 World Cup took place in Edmonton, Canada, and was the first major international rugby union tournament and women's world cup held in North America. New Zealand defeated England in the final to win their third successive world cup title.

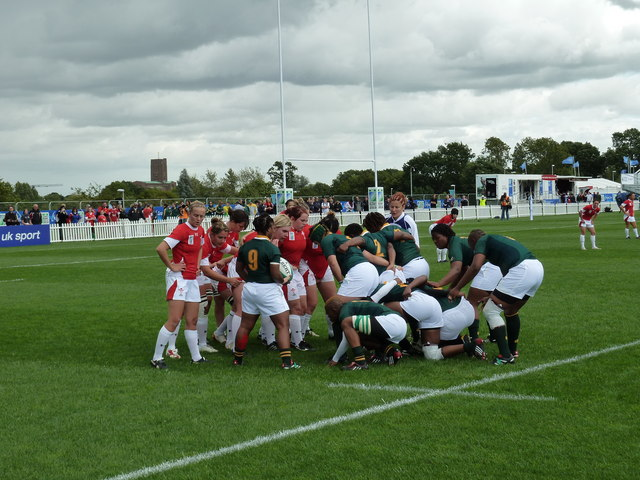
Wales v South Africa match in 2010

A record four countries expressed interest in hosting the 2010 World Cup. After considering bids from England, Germany, Kazakhstan and South Africa, the IRB announced that the 2010 event would take place in England. The tournament was staged in London, with the final played at the Twickenham Stoop.

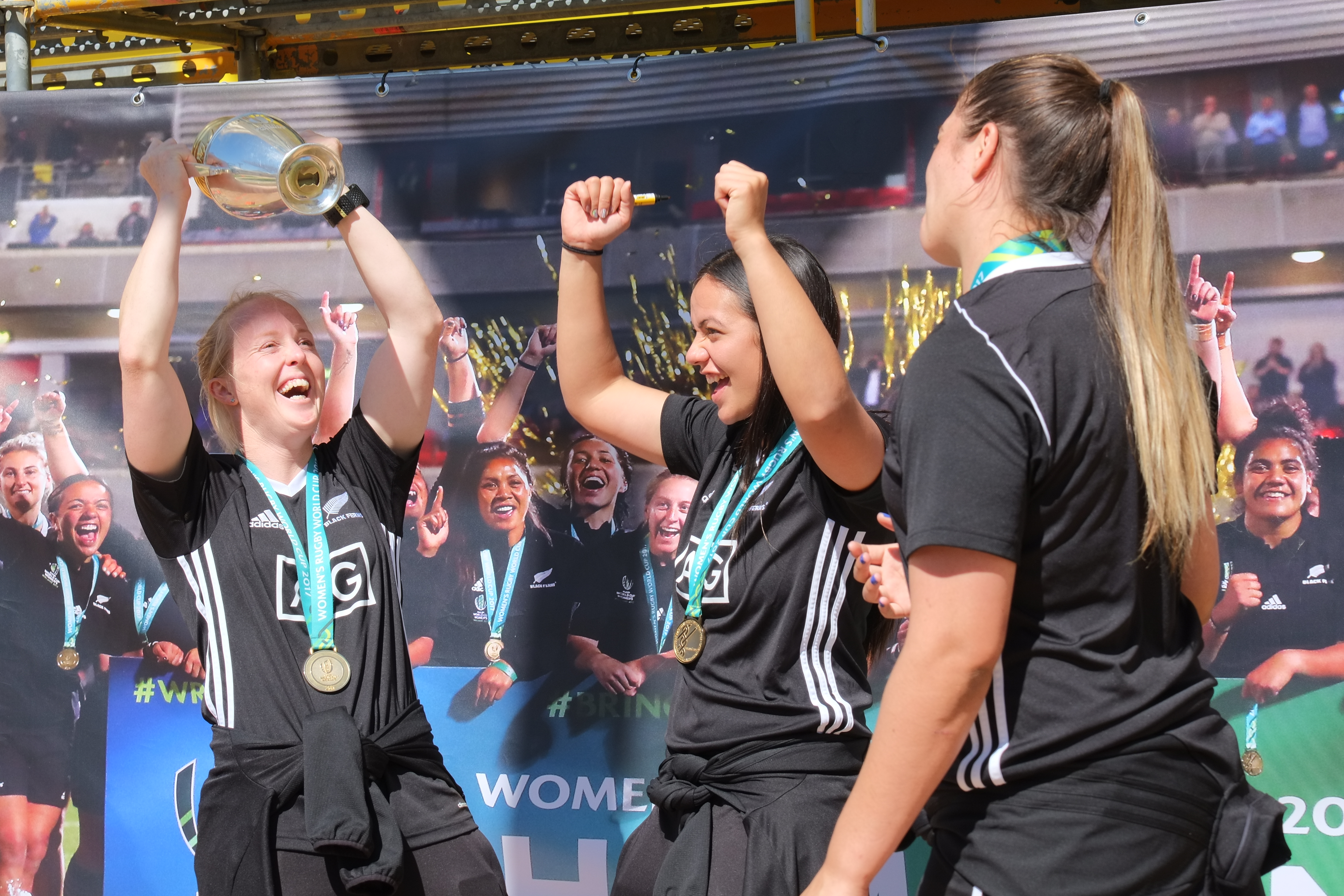
New Zealand celebrating their title in 2017

The 2017 World Cup was hosted by the Irish Rugby Football Union, which governs the sport on an All-Ireland basis. Games were held in Dublin in the Republic of Ireland and in Belfast in Northern Ireland. The tournament was held one year earlier than usual in order to re-align the Women's Rugby World Cup's scheduling for greater synergy with the Summer Olympics (which added rugby sevens in 2016) one year prior, and Rugby World Cup Sevens held the following year. The tournament was to return to a four-year cycle afterward, with the 2021 Rugby World Cup awarded to New Zealand.

Logo prior to 2021, when gender designation would be removed

In August 2019, World Rugby announced that in an effort to "elevate the profile of the women's game", the women's championship will be marketed under the "Rugby World Cup" branding, with no gender designation, beginning in 2021. World Rugby stated that the decision was intended to promote gender equality and "[eliminate] any inherent or perceived bias" towards men's events, with chairman Bill Beaumont explaining that it "demonstrates our ongoing and unwavering commitment to advancing women in rugby both on and off the field in line with our ambitious strategic plan." World Rugby became the first major sports federation to rebrand its events in such a way.

The 2021 tournament in New Zealand was postponed by one year to 2022 due to the COVID-19 pandemic; it will still be branded as the 2021 Rugby World Cup.

In 2025 the competition finals were expanded to 16 teams, from the 12 competing in 2021. On 12 May 2022, World Rugby announced that England, Australia and the United States would host the next three women's tournaments in 2025, 2029, and 2033 respectively. As part of a new strategy, Australia and the United States were also awarded the preceding men's tournaments in 2027 and 2031 respectively—marking the first time that the men's and women's Rugby World Cup will be held successively in the same host nation.

In October 2023, as part of a new brand identity unveiled for the tournaments, World Rugby reversed its decision to drop the gender designation from the women's tournament, returning to the previous "Women's Rugby World Cup" title beginning 2025, but rebranding the Rugby World Cup as the "Men's Rugby World Cup" beginning 2027. World Rugby stated that the rebranding was meant to "promote unity across the tournament and provide clarity and consistency for fans".

== Results and records ==
New Zealand have the most tournament wins, having won six times. England hold the record for most finals contested, having appeared in nine of the ten finals to date, and have been in the top three in every single tournament.

The record for most points overall is held by English player Emily Scarratt, who has scored 175 during her World Cup career. She also holds the record for most points in one tournament, with 70 in 2014.

Canadian Magali Harvey holds the record for most points scored in a match by a single player, 41; she achieved this in the pool stage of the 2017 tournament against Hong Kong national rugby union team. Ireland's Realtine Shrieves holds the record for most penalty goals in a game, with five. New Zealand's Kendra Cocksedge holds the conversion record of 13 in a single fixture, in which her countrywoman Portia Woodman set the single-game try-scoring record of eight vs Hong Kong in 2017.

Only five drop goals have been scored in the history of the competition, one each by Elinor Snowsill, Paula Chalmers, Shelley Rae, Amanda Bennett, and Carla Negri.

New Zealand's Portia Woodman-Wickliffe holds the try record for both a single tournament (13 tries) and in a Rugby World Cup career (20 tries). Realtine Shrieves holds the single tournament penalty record with 11 successful kicks at goal in the 1998 edition. England's Emily Scarratt holds the penalty scoring record with 19 successful kicks across the 2014-2021 editions (she debuted in 2010 but did not take up goal-kicking duties until 2014).

Kendra Cocksedge holds the record for most conversions in a single tournament with 23 in the 2017 edition, while Emily Scarratt maintains the total record with 39 conversions.

During the 2025 Women's Rugby World Cup, New Zealand's Braxton Sorensen-McGee and Canada's Julia Schell became the only female players to have scored two hat tricks in the tournament's history. Sorensen-McGee scored three tries in back to back matches against Japan and Ireland, and Schell produced a masterclass in scoring six tries (a double hat trick) in one match against Fiji. These are two of only three rugby players in history (men's and women's) to have achieved two hat tricks in one World Cup tournament, the other being former All Black winger Julian Savea in the men's 2015 World Cup.

The 1998 fixture between New Zealand and Germany, with a final score of 134–6, set records for the highest combined points score (140), the most points scored by a single team (134), and the largest winning margin (128).

=== Tournaments ===
Ed.	Year	Hosts	Final			Third place match			Num. teams
Ed.	Year	Hosts	(gold) Champions	Score	(silver) Runners-up	(bronze) Third place	Score	Fourth place	Num. teams
1	1991	Wales	United States	19–6; Cardiff Arms Park, Cardiff	England	France	Shared (Note: A third place match was played – won by France, probably by 3–0. However, the game can only be considered as "unofficial" as it was not part of the original tournament plan, and the result was not recorded in any official tournament reports. The game is also not included in NZRFU international records.)	New Zealand	12
2	1994	Scotland	England	38–23; Edinburgh Academicals, Edinburgh	United States	France	27–0; Edinburgh Academicals, Edinburgh	Wales	12
3	1998	Netherlands	New Zealand	44–12; NRCA Stadium, Amsterdam	United States	England	31–15; NRCA Stadium, Amsterdam	Canada	16
4	2002	Spain	New Zealand	19–9; Olympic Stadium, Barcelona	England	France	41–7; Olympic Stadium, Barcelona	Canada	16
5	2006	Canada	New Zealand	25–17; Commonwealth Stadium, Edmonton	England	France	17–8; Commonwealth Stadium, Edmonton	Canada	12
6	2010	England	New Zealand	13–10; Twickenham Stoop, London	England	Australia	22–8; Twickenham Stoop, London	France	12
7	2014	France	England	21–9; Stade Jean-Bouin, Paris	Canada	France	25–18; Stade Jean-Bouin, Paris	Ireland	12
8	2017	Ireland (Note: Was played in both the Republic of Ireland and Northern Ireland (United Kingdom).)	New Zealand	41–32; Ravenhill Stadium, Belfast	England	France	31–23; Ravenhill Stadium, Belfast	United States	12
9	2021 (Note: Took place in 2022 due to the COVID-19 pandemic.)	New Zealand	New Zealand	34–31; Eden Park, Auckland	England	France	36–0; Eden Park, Auckland	Canada	12
10	2025	England	England	33–13; Twickenham Stadium, London	Canada	New Zealand	42–26; Twickenham Stadium, London	France	16
11	2029	Australia	To be determined			To be determined			16
12	2033	United States	To be determined			To be determined			16

=== Team records ===
Team	Champions	Runners-up	Third place	Fourth place	Total top 4
New Zealand	6 (1998, 2002, 2006, 2010, 2017, 2021)		2 (1991, 2025)		8
England	3 (1994, 2014, 2025)	6 (1991, 2002, 2006, 2010, 2017, 2021)	1 (1998)		10
United States	1 (1991)	2 (1994, 1998)		1 (2017)	4
Canada		2 (2014, 2025)		4 (1998, 2002, 2006, 2021)	6
France			7 (1991, 1994, 2002, 2006, 2014, 2017, 2021)	2 (2010, 2025)	9
Australia			1 (2010)		1
Wales				1 (1994)	1
Ireland				1 (2014)	1

=== Participating nations ===
Team	1991 (Wales)	1994 (Scotland)	1998 (Netherlands)	2002 (Spain)	2006 (Canada)	2010 (England)	2014 (France)	2017 (Ireland)	2021 (New Zealand)	2025 (England)	2029 (Australia)	2033 (United States)
Australia	–	–	5th	7th	7th	3rd	7th	6th	6th	8th	Q	
Brazil	–	–	–	–	–	–	–	–	e	15th		
Canada	5th	6th	4th	4th	4th	6th	2nd	5th	4th	2nd	Q	
England	2nd	1st	3rd	2nd	2nd	2nd	1st	2nd	2nd	1st	Q	
Fiji	–	–	–	–	–	w	–	e	9th	12th		
France	3rd	3rd	8th	3rd	3rd	4th	3rd	3rd	3rd	4th	Q	
Germany	–	w	14th	16th	–	e	–	–	–	–		
Hong Kong	–	–	–	e	e	e	e	12th	w	e		
Ireland	–	7th	10th	14th	8th	7th	4th	8th	e	5th		
Italy	8th	w	12th	12th	–	e	e	9th	5th	10th		
Japan	11th	8th	–	13th	e	e	e	11th	12th	11th		
Kazakhstan	–	9th	9th	11th	11th	11th	12th	–	e	e		
Netherlands	7th	w	13th	15th	–	e	e	e	e	e		
New Zealand	3rd	w	1st	1st	1st	1st	5th	1st	1st	3rd	Q	
Russia	11th (Note: as Soviet Union)	11th	16th	–	–	e	e	e	e	–		
Samoa	–	–	–	9th	10th	e	11th	–	w	16th		
Scotland	–	5th	6th	6th	6th	8th	e	e	10th	7th		
South Africa	–	–	–	–	12th	10th	10th	–	11th	6th		
Spain	6th	w (Note: replaced by Scottish Students)	7th	8th	9th	e	9th	10th	e	14th		
Sweden	10th	10th	15th	–	–	12th	e	–	–	–		
United States	1st	2nd	2nd	5th	5th	5th	6th	4th	7th	9th		Q
Wales	9th	4th	11th	10th	–	9th	8th	7th	8th	13th		

Q = nation qualified for Final Tournament not yet played
w = nation withdrew from (final) Tournament
e = nation eliminated in qualifying stage and did not reach Final Tournament
– = nation did not enter competition.

The following nations have participated in qualifying stages, but have never reached the Final Tournament:

Team	1991 (Wales)	1994 (Scotland)	1998 (Netherlands)	2002 (Spain)	2006 (Canada)	2010 (England)	2014 (France)	2017 (Ireland)	2021 (New Zealand)	2025 (England)	2029 (Australia)	2033 (United States)
Belgium	–	–	–	–	–	e	–	e	–	–		
China	–	–	–	–	–	–	–	–	e	–		
Cameroon	–	–	–	–	–	–	–	–	–	e		
Colombia	–	–	–	–	–	–	–	–	e	e		
Czech Republic	–	–	–	–	–	–	–	e	–	–		
Finland	–	–	–	–	–	–	e	–	–	–		
India	–	–	–	–	–	–	–	–	e	–		
Kenya	–	–	–	–	–	–	e	–	e	e		
Laos	–	–	–	–	–	–	e	–	–	–		
Madagascar	–	–	–	–	–	–	–	–	e	e		
Papua New Guinea	–	–	–	–	–	w	–	e	e	e		
Philippines	–	–	–	–	–	–	e	–	e	–		
Singapore	–	–	–	–	–	e	e	–	e	–		
Switzerland	–	–	–	–	–	–	–	e	–	–		
Thailand	–	–	–	–	e	–	e	–	–	–		
Tonga	–	–	–	–	–	–	–	–	w	e		
Uganda	–	–	–	–	–	–	e	–	e	–		

e = nation eliminated in qualifying stage and did not reach Final Tournament
w = nation withdrew from qualifying stage
p = nation possibly eliminated in qualifying stage and will need to be successful in Repechage in order to reach Final Tournament
– = nation did not enter qualifying stage competition.

== Debut of national teams ==
Year	Nation(s)	Total
1991	Canada; England; France; Italy; Japan; Netherlands; New Zealand; Russia (Note: As the Soviet Union); Spain; Sweden; United States; Wales	12
1994	Ireland; Kazakhstan; Scotland	3
1998	Australia; Germany	2
2002	Samoa	1
2006	South Africa	1
2010	(none)	0
2014	(none)	0
2017	Hong Kong	1
2021	Fiji	1
2025	Brazil	1
2029	TBC	TBC

== Refereeing ==
=== Final referees ===
- 1991: (Wales) Les Peard
- 1994: (Scotland) Jim Fleming
- 1998: (England) Ed Morrison
- 2002: (Italy) Giulio De Santis
- 2006: (Ireland) Simon McDowell
- 2010: (Australia) Sarah Corrigan
- 2014: (Australia) Amy Perrett
- 2017: (Ireland) Joy Neville
- 2021: (Scotland) Hollie Davidson
- 2025: (Scotland) Hollie Davidson
- 2029: TBA

== Format ==
The format for the 2006 tournament split the 12 participating nations into four pools of three teams. Each nation played three games, after the completion of which a re-seeding process took place. Nations were moved into divisions dictated by their respective overall tournament ranking with the top teams proceeding to the knockout stages.

The 2010 event maintained the number of teams participating at twelve, with regional qualifying tournaments. The 2021 tournament retained the same format, but with the classification round replaced with quarter-finals, as with the men's Rugby World Cup. In 2025, the tournament will expand to 16 teams.

== Trophy ==
The current trophy for the Winners of the Women's Rugby World Cup was made for the 2025 tournament in England. Designed and crafted by London silversmith's Thomas Lyte, the trophy is made of sterling silver and plated with 24-carat gold. Made to stand at the same height as the Men's Rugby World Cup Trophy, the trophy is 38 cm tall and weighs 4.5 kg. The design was selected by nine former world champions; Rachael Burford, Gill Burns, Monalisa Codling, Katy Daley-McLean, Fiao'o Fa'amausili, Sarah Hunter, Farah Palmer, Anna Richards and Melodie Robinson, and was selected to address criticism of the previous trophy being too small.

There have been two previous trophies. The first was purchased for the 1991 Women's Rugby World Cup by Sue Dorrington from JB Jewellery and Antiques in Hatton Garden for £1,007.50 and was one of the last items to be arranged for the World Cup. Dorrington was drawn to the intricate lace detail round the top of the trophy, but it later transpired this made it almost impossible to drink from. The trophy was awarded again at the 1994 Women's Rugby World Cup, but replaced for the 1998 edition when the IRB took over organisation of the competition.

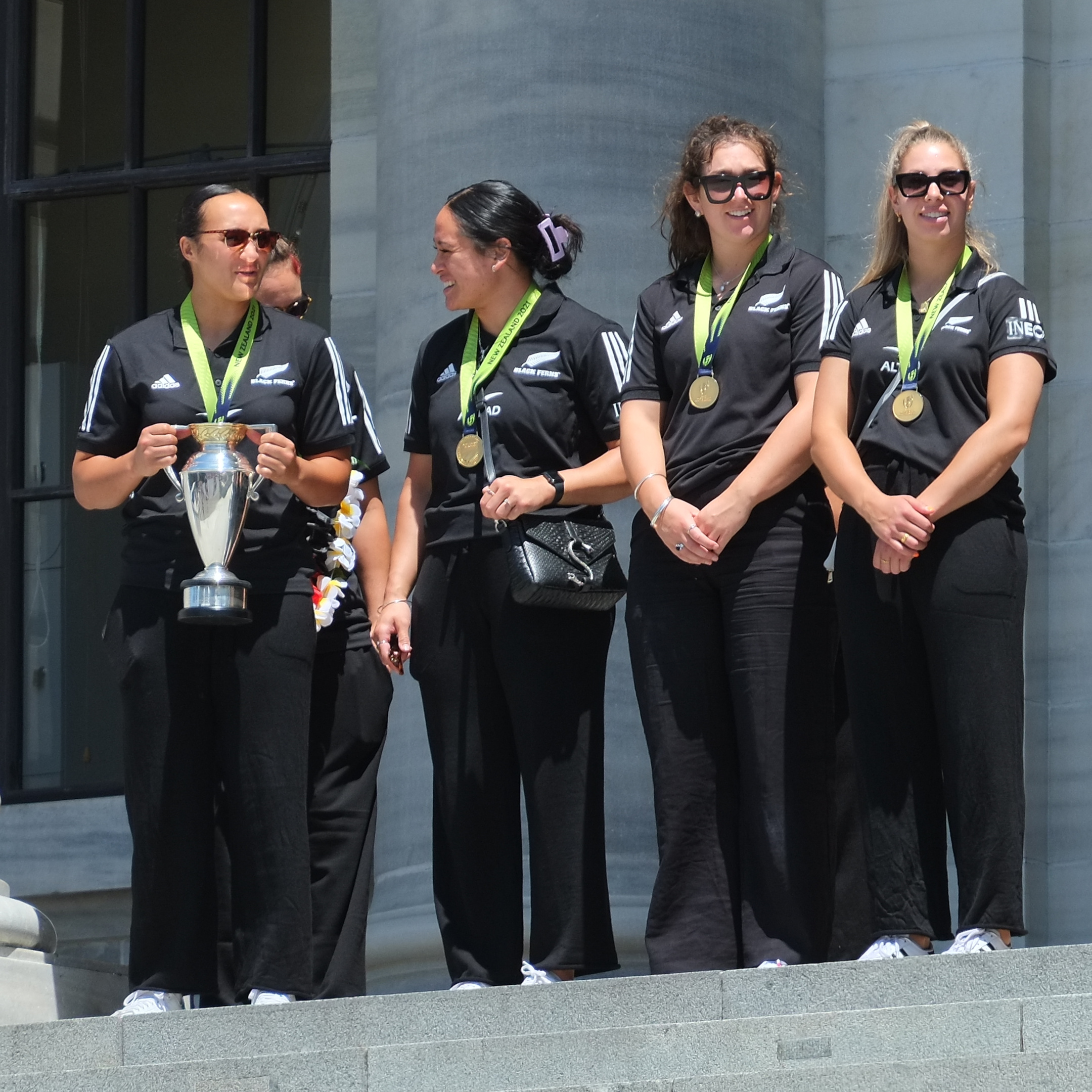
Standing with 2021 Rugby World Cup and medals on parliament steps

The second trophy would be presented at the next seven tournaments up to and including the 2021 Women's Rugby World Cup; won by New Zealand. This trophy was nicknamed 'Nancy' by the Black Ferns, who won it six times, in a reference to New Zealand World War II hero; Nancy Wake.

After being replaced, the first trophy then went on tour, was displayed during road shows put on by the Rugby Football Union for Women and was also briefly on display at the World Rugby Museum. The trophy disappeared after going on tour in 2006 and it was assumed that it had been melted down. Former Red Rose; Gill Burns had been searching for the trophy for several years until 2021 when it had been found in the loft of the parents of an England Rugby administrator; Helen Ames, during a clear-out, it was then returned to the World Rugby Museum. It was later learnt through Phil McGowan at the World Rugby Museum that the trophy had been made in 1924.

The second trophy, after being retired, was also put on display at the World Rugby Museum.

== Media coverage ==
The tournament has grown considerably in recent editions, with attendance more than tripling between 2017 and 2021 editions, then again from 2021 to 2025 which saw over four hundred thousand fans attend the tournament, including record attendance for the competition at both the opening game, and the sold out final at Twickenham.

There has been commensurate growth with the television coverage, 1.3 million New Zealanders - over a quarter of the Kiwi population - watched the Black Ferns victory against the Red Roses during the 2021 edition. During the 2025 edition TF1 saw 3.8 million viewers for France's semi-final clash with England, and the BBC saw 5.8 million viewers for the final against Canada.

In the United Kingdom, Sky Sports broadcast 13 live matches from the 2010 Women's Rugby World Cup, including the semi-finals, the third and fourth place play-off match and the final. The pool matches shown included all of England's matches, while each of the home nations' featured live too. There were also highlights shown from all other matches during the pool stages. From 2017, the Women's Rugby World Cup was shown on free-to-air TV on ITV (2017–2021) and the BBC (2025—).

In Ireland the Women's Rugby World Cup was broadcast by TG4 in 2014, the Irish language channel received praise for airing the tournament. TG4 provided coverage to all of the Irish matches as well as the final and semi-final.

== See also ==
- Rugby World Cup (men)
- Women's rugby union
- Women's international rugby
- Women's Rugby League World Cup
