= 2014 Women's Rugby World Cup qualifying =

2014 Rugby World Cup qualifying
Tournament details
- Dates: 2010 – 2014
- No. of nations: 26

The qualification process for the 2014 Women's Rugby World Cup began on 5 February 2012. A total of 12 teams will qualify for the tournament, which will be held in France between 1 and 17 August 2014.

== Qualification process ==
Following WRWC 2010, six teams received an automatic qualification berth - these berths being given the top 3 teams (New Zealand, England, and Australia), the hosts (France), Canada, and the United States. The remaining six berths for the tournament will be awarded through regional tournaments.

The non-automatic qualification process began on 5 February 2012. Twenty teams competed in over 49 matches to win one of the six remaining places at the 2014 tournament.

== Regional qualification ==
There will be 12 nations participating in the 2014 Women's Rugby World Cup. Six teams have automatically qualified by virtue of their performance at the prior Rugby World Cup, leaving six teams to qualify through regional matches. Regional Qualification began on 5 February 2012, during the first round of the 2012 Women's Six Nations Championship.

In all, 26 national teams have been involved in the 2014 World Cup - six as automatic qualifiers and 20 as entrants in the qualification rounds.

Region	Automatic qualifiers	Teams in qualifying process	Qualifying places	Qualified teams	World Cup pools
Africa (CAR)	0	3	1	South Africa	C
Americas (NACRA/CONSUR)	2	0	0	Canada (AQ); United States (AQ)	A B
Asia (ARFU)	0	7	1	Kazakhstan	B
Europe (FIRA-AER)	2	10	4	England (AQ); France (AQ); Ireland; Samoa * Spain; Wales	A C B A A C
Oceania (FORU)	2	0	0	Australia (AQ); New Zealand (AQ)	C B
TOTAL	6	20	6		

* Samoa, despite being from Oceania, qualified through the European tournament.

=== African Qualification ===
==== Round One ====
The initial round of African qualification was the annual, two game, Elgon Cup tournament between Kenya and Uganda. Each team won their home games, however Uganda won on point aggregate.

15 June 2013

Kenya	18–17	Uganda

Moi International Sports Centre, Nairobi

22 June 2013

Uganda	13–8	Kenya

Kyadondo Rugby Club, Kampala

One game each. Uganda win the Elgon Cup 30–26 on aggregate

==== Round Two ====
South Africa played a single game against the Round One winners, Uganda. South Africa won easily, and secured qualification to the World Cup.

7 September 2013

South Africa	63–3	Uganda

East London, Eastern Cape

=== Americas Qualification ===
Canada and the United States automatically qualified.

=== Asian Qualification ===
The winner of the 2013 ARFU Asian Four Nations, Kazakhstan, qualified directly.

==== Round One ====
Singapore won the 2012 ARFU D2. They were promoted to D1 and were eligible to qualify

Semi-finals
14 June 2012
Laos	0
Singapore	74
14 June 2012
Philippines	18
Thailand	50

Final
16 June 2012
Singapore	21
Thailand	19

==== Round Two ====
Kazakhstan defeated tough competition to win the 2013 ARFU A4N and qualify directly.

Semi-finals
4 September 2013
Japan	82
Hong Kong	0
4 September 2013
Kazakhstan	91
Singapore	5

Final
7 September 2013
Kazakhstan	25
Japan	23

=== European Qualification ===
France automatically qualified by virtue of being hosts. England automatically qualified by finishing second in the 2010 tournament. In addition, there were four other places available for European countries.

(Samoa participated in the European qualification)

==== Round One ====
The top two teams from the combined 2012 and 2013 Women's Six Nations Championship, Ireland and Wales, qualify directly. The remaining two teams, Italy and Scotland, proceed to Round Three.

Position	Nation	Games				Points				Table points
Position	Nation	Played	Won	Drawn	Lost	For	Against	Difference	Tries	Table points
1	Ireland	10	8	0	2	197	67	130	25	16
2	Wales	10	4	0	6	105	192	-86	16	8
3	Italy	10	3	0	7	94	225	-131	9	6
4	Scotland	10	0	0	10	15	342	-327	2	0

==== Round Two ====
The top two teams from the 2012 Women's European Championship (Group B) proceed to Round Three.

Semi-finals
3 May 2012
Finland	0
Netherlands	105
3 May 2012
Russia	0
Sweden	67

Final
7 May 2012
Sweden	10
Netherlands	3

==== Round Three ====
The four teams from the previous two rounds, plus Spain and Samoa, competed in a tournament. The top two teams, Spain and Samoa, qualified.

Position	Nation	Games				Match points		Bonus points		Table points
Position	Nation	Played	Won	Drawn	Lost	For	Against	Tries (4+)	Losing (≤7)	Table points
1	Spain	3	3	0	0	171	7	3	0	15
2	Samoa	3	2	0	1	84	69	3	0	11
3	Scotland	3	2	0	1	95	42	2	0	10
4	Italy	3	2	0	1	99	62	1	0	9
5	Netherlands	3	0	0	3	21	138	0	0	0
6	Sweden	3	0	0	3	8	147	0	0	0

=== Oceanic Qualification ===
New Zealand and Australia automatically qualified by finishing first and third respectively in the 2010 tournament. Samoa qualified through the European qualification.
