= 2010 ARFU Women's Rugby Championship =

Tournament details
- Host: Japan
- Venue: Prince Chichibu Memorial Stadium, Tokyo
- Date: 22 April 2010
- Countries: Japan; Hong Kong
- Teams: 2

Final positions
- Champions: Japan (1st title)
- Runner-up: Hong Kong

Tournament statistics
- Matches played: 1

The 2010 ARFU Women's Rugby Championship was the fourth edition of the tournament. It was played between Japan and Hong Kong on 22 April at the Prince Chichibu Memorial Stadium in Tokyo. However, some sources suggest that the match was the ARFU Division 1 XV Championship.

The ARFU also put together a development competition. These were not test matches and lasted 40 minutes. There were only three countries competing: Laos, Thailand, and the Philippines.

== ARFU Women's Rugby Championship ==
2010-05-22

Japan	17–0	Hong Kong

Prince Chichibu Memorial Stadium, Tokyo

== ARFU Development Cup ==
Pos	Team	Pld	W	D	L	PF	PA	PD	Pts
1	Laos	2	1	1	0	17	10	+7	4
2	Philippines	2	1	1	0	10	5	+5	4
3	Thailand	2	0	0	2	5	17	−12	2

Source: http://www.rugbyarchive.net/compseasons/3026?Stagione=2010

2010-10-17

Laos	12–5	Thailand

Sikeut, Laos

2010-10-17

Thailand	0–5	Philippines

Sikeut, Laos

2010-10-17

Laos	5–5	Philippines

Sikeut, Laos
