= Ada Milby =

Filipino rugby player

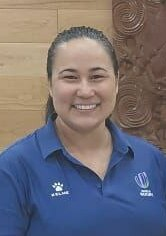
- Milby in 2023
- Born: Ada Lacia Milby (Note: Although born in the United States, Ada Milby still possesses her mother's maiden name (Lacia) as is the convention in the Philippines as indicated on her birth record.); July 6, 1983 (age 43); Troy, Ohio, U.S.
- Children: 2
- Relatives: Sam Milby (brother)
- Military career
- Allegiance: United States
- Branch: U.S. Army
- Service years: 2005
- Rank: Staff sergeant
- Conflicts: Iraq War
- Height: 162 cm (5 ft 4 in)
- Weight: 81 kg (179 lb; 12 st 11 lb)
- Height and weight correct as of August 2017

Rugby union career
International career
Years	Team	Apps	(Points)
2012–	Philippines		
National sevens team
Years	Team		Comps
2012–	Philippines (sevens)		

Ada Lacia Milby (Tagalog pronunciation: [ˈmilbɪ]; born July 6, 1983) is a Filipino-American rugby player who plays for the Philippine national women's team. She is also the first female member of the World Rugby Council. Ada is the first woman to be appointed to the World Rugby Council, in 2017 she serves on the Regions Committee and Rugby Committee; and she is also a member of the Asia Rugby EXCO since 2016. She heads the Women Advisory Committee and serves on the Admin and Finance Committee. She is now also the President of Philippine Rugby Football Union, being on the board since 2013.

== Early life and education ==
Milby was born to an American father and a Filipino mother in Troy in Ohio in the United States. Ada Milby has a younger brother Sam Milby who would later be an actor in the Philippines. She grew up in Tipp City in Ohio where she attended high school.

In high school she played American football for the boys' team of her school as a left half back or safety. She described the experience as "unwelcoming". She only stayed in the team for a year due to gender discrimination she encountered from her own male teammates. Prior to playing American football she was a competitive figure skater for 12 years.

She attended the DeVry University for her college studies. It was on her first year of college when she decided to take up rugby when she encountered a booth of girls recruiting rugby players at the Wright State University. She graduated from DeVry with a degree in "Business Management, Klemmer & Associates in Leadership".

After graduating from Devry, Milby entered the US Army in 2005 and was stationed in Iraq for a year. She held the rank of staff sergeant. In Iraq, she served in a 500-personnel battalion, with only 25 women.

She would later come to the Philippines in 2011 to reside with her brother who had settled in the country.

== Playing career ==
Milby made her international debut for the Philippines in 2012 and was designated captain of the rugby union team later that year. She also captained the sevens side. She was part of the rugby sevens squad that competed at the Asian Women's Sevens Series in 2013. She has also competed at the Southeast Asian Games having competed at the 2015 Southeast Asian Games where she helped the team secure a bronze medal, the 2017 Southeast Asian Games., and reclaimed the podium in the 2019 Southeast Asia Games with a silver medal finish.

== Rugby administration ==
Milby is involved with the Philippine Rugby Football Union having served as its Secretary General. In 2013, she was the head of development for grassroots rugby in the country, launching the "Get Into Rugby" program in the same year. This led to her nomination as a member of the Philippine Rugby board of directors. She then became a member of the Asia Rugby Executive Committee and the Women's Rugby Chairperson of the continental body. The World Rugby Council decided in 2017 to allow for 17 new members provided that all of them would be women. Asia Rugby was the first one to respond to the move of the global body naming Milby as the first woman member of the World Rugby Council in mid-November 2017. In 2020, she was named to Rugby World Magazine's list of Top 50 Most Influential People in Rugby.

Milby was elected as the President of the Philippine Rugby Football Union on December 15, 2020, succeeding Rick Santos.

== Personal life ==
As of 2017, Milby has two daughters with the younger born in 2015.
