= Asia Rugby =

Administrative body for rugby union in Asia

- Formation: 1968
- Type: Sports federation
- Headquarters: Hong Kong
- Members: 36 unions
- President: Qais Al-Dhalai
- CEO: Benjamin Van Rooyen
- Website: asiarugby.com

Asia Rugby, formerly the Asian Rugby Football Union, is the governing body of rugby union in Asia under the authority of World Rugby. Founded in 1968 by eight charter nations, the Union today has 36 member unions in countries across Asia, stretching from Kazakhstan to Guam.

The aim of Asia Rugby is "to raise physical and moral standards in Asia by education in the healthy pursuit of Rugby Football and to promote friendship among Asian countries".

== Members ==
Asia Rugby has 36 member unions. Not all member unions are members of World Rugby. Asia Rugby members are listed below, with the year each union joined World Rugby shown in brackets. World Rugby associates are shown in italics.

There are 22 World Rugby members, and 6 World Rugby associates:

- Brunei (2013*)
- China (1997)
- (Chinese Taipei) Chinese Taipei (1988)
- Guam (1998)
- (Hong Kong) Hong Kong (1988)
- India (1999)
- Indonesia (2013)
- Iran (2020)
- Japan (1987)
- Jordan (2024)
- Kazakhstan (1997)
- (South Korea) Korea (1988)
- Kyrgyzstan (2004*)
- (Laos) Lao (2020)
- Lebanon (2018*)
- Malaysia (1988)
- Mongolia (2004*)
- Nepal (2023)
- Pakistan (2008)
- Philippines (2008)
- Qatar (2023)
- Singapore (1989)
- Syria (2022*)
- (Sri Lanka) Sri Lanka (1988)
- Thailand (1989)
- United Arab Emirates (2012)
- Uzbekistan (2014)

There are 8 members not affiliated with World Rugby

- Afghanistan
- Bahrain
- Bangladesh
- Cambodia
- Iraq
- Macau
- Oman
- Palestine
- Saudi Arabia

Other unions not affiliated with Asia Rugby

- Vietnam^{‡}

Several rugby governing bodies for countries in Asia (partially, largely or entirely) – such as Armenia, Cyprus, Georgia, Israel, Russia and Turkey – are members of the European body, Rugby Europe. Conversely, Kazakhstan, which is administered by European associations in other sports (such as within the football governing body, FIFA) is administered as part of Asia Rugby. In addition, Asia Rugby includes Guam (the organized unincorporated territory of the United States), which is arguably not in Asia, but in Oceania, and one transcontinental country, Indonesia.

A former member, the Arabian Gulf Rugby Football Union, represented Bahrain, Kuwait, Oman, Qatar, Saudi Arabia and the UAE until it was dissolved at the end of 2010 to allow separate national unions administer the game in each country. The new governing body for the UAE became the 100th full member of World Rugby in November 2012. In 2020, Qatar became an associate member of World Rugby and Saudi Arabia became an associate member of Asia Rugby. The other three countries do not yet have a national governing body affiliated with Asia Rugby.

Notes

* Denotes World Rugby associate membership date.

^^{†} Cambodia regained associate membership of Asia Rugby in 2020, after being suspended in 2016 for not complying with membership criteria.

^^{‡} Vietnam is not currently a member of Asia Rugby.

== Tournaments ==
Asia Rugby supports regional and pan-Asian tournaments for men's and women's teams in fifteen-a-side and seven-a-side rugby, including:

Men

- Asia Rugby Championship
- Asia Rugby Sevens Series
- Asia Rugby Sevens Trophy
- Asia Rugby U19 Championship

Women

- Asia Rugby Women's Championship
- Asia Rugby Women's Sevens Series
- Asia Rugby Women's Sevens Trophy

=== Sevens Series ===
The Asian Sevens Series is similar to the HSBC World Sevens Series, but at a regional level.

== World Rugby Rankings ==
Men's World Rugby Rankings (as of 2 January 2023)
Asia*	World Rugby	+/-	National Team	Points
1	10	Steady	Japan	77.39
2	24	Steady	Hong Kong	59.66
3	32	Steady	South Korea	52.62
4	42	Steady	Philippines	47.8
5	46	▲1	Sri Lanka	46.73
6	50	▲1	Malaysia	46.12
7	55	▼1	Singapore	44.05
8	60	Steady	United Arab Emirates	41.23
9	63	Steady	Kazakhstan	40.91
10	65	Steady	Chinese Taipei	39.23
11	71	Steady	Guam	36.38
12	79	Steady	Thailand	35.49
13	82	Steady	China	34.91
14	85	Steady	India	33.4
15	90	Steady	Uzbekistan	31.28
16	92	Steady	Pakistan	30.78
17	94	Steady	Iran	30
18	95	Steady	Laos	30
19	105	Steady	Indonesia	21.95
*Local rankings based on World Rugby ranking points

Women's World Rugby Rankings (as of 2 January 2023)
Asia*	World Rugby	+/-	National Team	Points
1	12	Steady	Japan	67.94
2	15	Steady	Hong Kong	59.25
3	20	Steady	Kazakhstan	57.09
4	22	Steady	China	49.34
5	36	Steady	Singapore	40.06
6	45	Steady	India	37.6
7	48	Steady	Thailand	36.35
8	51	Steady	Uzbekistan	35.4
9	55	Steady	Philippines	33.16
*Local rankings based on World Rugby ranking points

== Organisation structure ==
Updated: 26 March 2021
Executive Committee

Qais Al-Dhalai
^{President}
Terence Khoo
^{Deputy President}
Rizwan Malik
^{Vice President}
Tanka Lal Ghising
^{Vice President}
Abdallah Jammal
^{Committee Member}
Ada Milby
^{World Rugby Council Member}
Aigul Jartybayeva
^{Committee Member}
Angelina Liu
^{Committee Member}
Batbayar Purevjargal
^{Committee Member}
Fahmy Jalil
^{Committee Member}
Gerald Prabhu
^{Committee Member}
Yudha Ramon
^{Committee Member}
Asanga Seneviratne
^{Independent Committee Member}
Vela Tan
^{Independent Committee Member}

The member unions form the Council which is Asia Rugby’s ultimate decision-making body. The Council meets twice a year, including for the Annual General Meeting (AGM) at the end of each year where the 12-person executive committee (Exco) is elected.

As of 2020, the president of Asia Rugby is Qais Al-Dhalai of the United Arab Emirates.

Management and staff of Asia Rugby, headed by CEO Benjamin Van Rooyen based at Olympic House, Causeway Bay in Hong Kong.

Also, Asia Rugby has contracted with a number of Officers in Asia for Development.

NAME	POSITION
Benjamin Van Rooyen	CEO
Daniella Filipovic’	Admin & Communications Officer
Gene Tong	WR Regional Training Manager
Ghaith Jalajel	Competitions Manager
Khuram Haroon	Operations & Digital Media
Anatoliy Shirov	Governance & Competitions
Dilroy Fernando	Match Officials & Development
Affan Jahangir	Public Relations Officer
Mahfizul Islam	Development Consultant

== See also ==
- Rugby union in Asia
