= 2026 Asia Rugby Women's Championship =

Tournament details
- Host: Kazkahstan
- Date: 30 April – 10 May 2026
- Countries: Hong Kong; Japan; Kazakhstan
- Teams: 3

Final positions
- Champions: Japan (8th title)
- Runner-up: Kazakhstan

Tournament statistics
- Matches played: 3

The 2026 Asia Rugby Women's Championship was the 15th edition of the Asia Rugby Women's Championship. The tournament was held in Almaty, Kazakhstan and took place from 30 April to 10 May. Matches were played at the Almaty Sports Training Complex.

Japan won their eighth championship title after winning their first two matches, while Kazakhstan had their best finish since 2023 as the runner-up following a final game draw with Hong Kong.

== Standings ==
Pos	Team	Pld	W	D	L	PF	PA	PD	TF	TA	TB	LB	Pts
1	Japan	2	2	0	0	135	24	+111	25	4	2	0	10
2	Kazakhstan	2	0	1	1	38	90	−52	6	14	1	0	3
3	Hong Kong	2	0	1	1	38	97	−59	6	15	1	0	3

Source: Asia Rugby

== Fixtures ==
30 April 2026

Kazakhstan	12-64	Japan (1BP)

Almaty Sports Training Complex, Almaty

5 May 2026

(1BP) Japan	71-12	Hong Kong

Almaty Sports Training Complex, Almaty

10 May 2026

(1BP) Kazakhstan	26-26	Hong Kong (1BP)

Almaty Sports Training Complex, Almaty
