= Thailand national team =

Thailand national team may refer to:

- Thailand national basketball team
- Thailand national badminton team
- Thailand national baseball team
- Thailand national cricket team
- Thailand national women's cricket team
- Thailand women's national handball team
- Thailand national ice hockey team
- Thailand national rugby union team
- Thailand national rugby sevens team
- Thailand women's national rugby union team\
- Thailand national football team
- Thailand national under-17 football team
- Thailand national under-20 football team
- Thailand national under-23 football team
- Thailand national beach soccer team
- Thailand women's national football team
- Thailand national futsal team
- Thailand men's national volleyball team
- Thailand women's national volleyball team
