= 1999 Rugby World Cup – Asia qualification =

The Asian Rugby Football Union was allotted one place in the 1999 Rugby World Cup by direct qualification (Asia 1) and one place in the repechage tournament. Eight teams participated in the qualification tournament for Asia which was held in three stages. The first two stages (Rounds 1 and 2) were played in 1997 and the last stage (Round 3) was played in 1998.

The three lowest ranked sides played a single round robin tournament (drawn for home or away), with top placed team progressing to the next round and the other two teams dropping out. Rounds two was played in a similar fashion – the three lowest ranked remaining sides (i.e. the winner of the previous round and the next two lowest ranked teams) played a single round robin tournament (drawn for home or away).

The final stage changed the pattern in that the top two teams from round three progressed to round four, and all matches were played in Singapore. A four team single round robin was played and Japan secured their (Asia 1) qualification for RWC 1999 as the top placed side, with korea in second place progressing to the repechage.

== Round 1 ==
Pos	Team	Pld	W	D	L	PF	PA	PD	Pts
1	Sri Lanka	2	2	0	0	48	30	+18	6
2	Thailand	2	1	0	1	31	41	−10	4
3	Singapore	2	0	0	2	26	34	−8	2

Date	Team #1	Score	Team #2	Venue
1 February 1997	Singapore	11–16	Thailand	Singapore
15 February 1997	Thailand	15–30	Sri Lanka	Bangkok, Thailand
19 April 1997	Sri Lanka	18–15	Singapore	Kuala Lumpur, Malaysia

== Round 2 ==
Pos	Team	Pld	W	D	L	PF	PA	PD	Pts
1	Chinese Taipei	2	2	0	0	82	40	+42	6
2	Sri Lanka	2	1	0	1	64	46	+18	4
3	Malaysia	2	0	0	2	28	88	−60	2

Date	Team #1	Score	Team #2	Venue
29 November 1997	Malaysia	15–37	Sri Lanka	Kuala Lumpur, Malaysia
20 December 1997	Chinese Taipei	51–13	Malaysia	Taipei, Republic of China
17 January 1998	Sri Lanka	27–31	Chinese Taipei	Bangkok, Thailand

== Round 3 ==
All round 3 games were held in Singapore.

Pos	Team	Pld	W	D	L	PF	PA	PD	Pts
1	Japan	3	3	0	0	221	25	+196	9
2	South Korea	3	1	0	2	104	81	+23	5
3	Chinese Taipei	3	1	0	2	57	227	−170	5
4	Hong Kong	3	1	0	2	39	88	−49	5

Date	Team #1	Score	Team No. 2
24 October 1998	South Korea	12–40	Japan
24 October 1998	Chinese Taipei	30–12	Hong Kong
27 October 1998	Japan	134–6	Chinese Taipei
27 October 1998	Hong Kong	20–11	South Korea
31 October 1998	Chinese Taipei	21–81	South Korea
31 October 1998	Hong Kong	7–47	Japan

Japan qualified for RWC 1999, South Korea qualified for repechage.
