= Gemma Hallett =

Wales international rugby union player

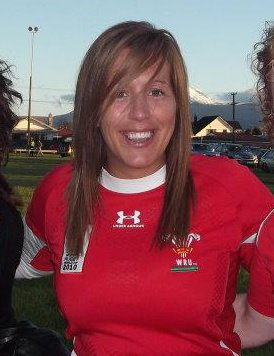
- Born: 24 August 1981 (age 45) Pontypridd, Wales
- Height: 5 ft 11 in (1.80 m)
- Weight: 88 kg (13 st 12 lb)
- School: Ysgol Gyfun Llanharry
- University: University of Central Lancashire, University of South Wales

Rugby union career
- Position(s): Second Row, Number 8
Amateur team(s)
Years	Team	Apps	(Points)
2001–2005	UCLAN & Preston		
2002–2015	Pontyclun Falcons		
2004	Wales Student & Wales A		
2010–2014	Cardiff Blues		
2005	Sydney Eastern Suburbs		
2011	Stoke New Zealand		
2014	Cardiff Blues Select		
2014	Nomads		
International career
Years	Team	Apps	(Points)
2006–2013	Wales	35	(5)

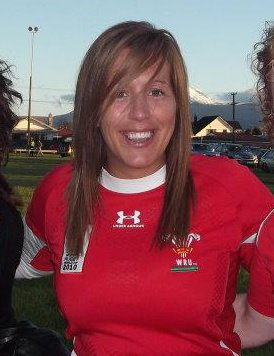
Gemma Hallett

Gemma Hallett (born 24 August 1981) is a Welsh rugby union retired professional player who has played second row and number 8, earning 35 caps for Wales.

Hallett started her international career making her appearance in the Welsh Students squad in April 2004 coached by Nadine Griffiths. Hallett along with scrum half Laura Prosser were selected to join the Welsh Development team where they played in fixtures against England A, both Hallett and Prosser were late call up replacements for the injured Mellissa Berry and Beth Gallacher for the national squad tour of South Africa in the summer of 2004. Hallett came off the bench to earn her first taste of senior international rugby to face Eastern Province.

She was part of the Welsh teams that won the Triple Crown in 2009, played in the 2010 Women's Rugby World Cup, and secured qualification for the 2014 Women's Rugby World Cup.

Since retiring from rugby Hallett has also been a Sky Sports pundit for the 2014 Rugby World Cup and commentator for the Women's Six Nations, for the BBC and World Rugby Live feed.

== Rugby player ==
=== Early years ===
After impressing then coach Nadine Griffiths for the Welsh students squad whilst in university, Hallett was invited to join the tour to South Africa in 2004. It is during this time a desire to play for the National squad took hold.

In 2005 following her graduation, she embarked on a season playing in Australia for Sydney's Eastern Suburbs. She enjoyed a season of running rugby where she played at No. 8, and captained the team against a touring Singapore side.

=== National team ===
Following her return to Wales, and a switch of positions to second row, she made her full Wales International debut earning her first cap against Italy in the autumn of 2006 at Cardiff's Glamorgan Wanderer's ground, followed a week later by a starting position against the Netherlands at Llanrhumney playing fields.

She scored her only international try against Sweden in November 2009.

Hallett became a regular international from 2006 to 2010 where she earned 30 caps across Six Nations, European Championships and World Cup playing in each fixture, only missing two games through a knee medial injury during the 2008 Six Nations. Though Hallett grew into her role as a senior squad member, she was also known for her playfulness and camaraderie off the field. often responsible for social activities.

Hallett had a key role in starting all of Wales's World Cup games at England 2010. A tournament which saw her struggling with an allergic reaction to the antibiotics she was taking to combat a viral infection. She was ordered to bed rest for the days in between matches during the later part of the tournament.

=== Sabbatical ===
In 2011, Hallett took a sabbatical to travel several countries. While in New Zealand, Hallett played for Stoke Rugby Club in Nelson, making her mark back at number 8, topping the league and progressing to the playoffs.

When the season ended, Hallett was asked to blog on behalf of the Welsh Rugby Union from a supporters perspective. She travelled with and supported the Wales' men team around the north island for the 2011 Rugby World Cup.

=== Return to Wales ===
Hallett returned to Wales and her Welsh club Pontyclun to continue playing one more season at amateur level. Hallett then was recruited by Cardiff Blues and National coaches and returned the National set up.

She was made vice captain for the 2013 Six Nations squad, and captained the team in their warm up fixtures and game against France for the injured skipper Rachel Taylor. Her last game for Wales was the final 6 nations game against England that year.

The same season Hallett was named Premiership Player of The Year at the annual WRU women's dinner, where she was presented with a trophy by her playing idol; Scott Quinnell.

Hallett also captained the Cardiff Blues squad in 2012 and 2013 campaigns. In 2013, she became the first woman to captain a Cardiff Blues side at the Cardiff Arms Park. During this campaign, she led the Blues team to be regional champions in a match against the Ospreys. She has openly expressed this as one of her proudest rugby moments.

=== Overlooked by Wales ===
After her most successful season in rugby Hallett was dropped from the Welsh squad and failed to make Rhys Edwards' 2014 Six Nations squad. Hallett has since proclaimed that she voiced her disapproval over the WRU managements decision to withdraw Wales Women from the RBS 6 Nations tournament and into a second-tier competition.

Following her departure from the international set up, Hallett represented the invitational team, the Nomads, in World Cup 2014 warm up matches against Wales at the National Centre of Excellence and two fixtures against South Africa in their World Cup preparations in England.

Her final game came in November 2014 where she led the Cardiff Blues invitational team in a historic encounter against the Combined Services, for a commemorative fixture marking the 100 year anniversary of Remembrance, played at the Cardiff Arms Park where she led the Blues to a 17–12 victory in atrocious conditions.

=== In retirement ===
Since retiring from playing and coaching, Hallett has provided pitch-side commentary and studio punditry for Sky Sports, World Rugby, S4C and BBC.

In her farewell to the rugby world, Hallett used her voice and platform one final time to raise awareness and voice her concerns of the WRU failings in her blog piece “How the WRU Failed it’s Women”. In an open letter to the powers that be, she wrote a strongly-held view as to why the Welsh team underperformance in the 2020 Women's Six Nations and a plea for the 'custodians of today's game to lead with optimism and provide a clear pathway for Welsh women's rugby players into a new decade of performance and growth'.

Hallett is now an advocate for elite Women's performance pathways in Wales and was an integral part of reaching out to the WRU and led 123 former player to write to the WRU and demand action. She regularly takes to twitter to call out the inaction of the WRU in providing pathways or repairing the damage they have caused to the elite game.

== miFuture ==
Hallett founded and is CEO of miFuture, an organisation that aims to revise the school leaving process. She took redundancy from her teaching job to start a social business that helps mobilise school leavers and those furthest from the labour market towards better futures and advocates for young people that choose not to go to university or are less privileged than those who can.

miFuture was intended to support students who cannot afford or choose to not pursue upper education by instead approaching jobs, courses, apprenticeship and volunteering experiences. miFuture was announced as a semi-finalist for the 2021 Impact Summit competition.

In 2021, Hallett launched miFuture 2.0, which included an AI powered interview preparation tool and Skill Bursts.

As a response to COVID-19, miFuture released access to its platform for free for all partners and collaborators.
