= Rugby union in Asia =

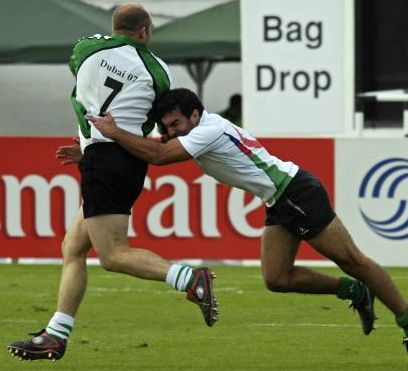
Action at the Dubai Sevens

Rugby union in Asia is governed by the Asian Rugby Football Union (ARFU). As of December 2009 there are 28 ARFU member unions, of whom 15 are full members of World Rugby, and six further associate members of World Rugby in Asia. The flagship tournament for promoting the sport in Asia is the Asian Five Nations, which launched in 2008, and which most recently in 2011 saw the national teams of Hong Kong (national team), Japan (national team), Kazakhstan (national team), Sri Lanka (national team) and the UAE, compete in the main tournament.

The sport in Asia is currently dominated by Japan, the only Asian nation to be represented on World Rugby's executive council. The Japanese national team are so far the only Asian team to have competed in the Rugby World Cup, having appeared in all seven tournaments so far. Japan served as the hosts for the 2019 Rugby World Cup, which saw them become the first Asian country to host the tournament.

The Top League is Japan's premier rugby club competition, founded in 2003. In 2016, the Sunwolves joined the Southern Hemisphere-based Super Rugby. The team is based in Tokyo but also plays home games in Singapore.

== Member nations ==
Sixteen Asian teams are full members of World Rugby, though one (Guam) is arguably in Oceania.

- Arabian Gulf
- China
- Guam
- Hong Kong
- Japan
- India
- Thailand
- Philippines
- Kazakhstan
- Malaysia
- Singapore
- South Korea
- Sri Lanka
- Taiwan (competes as Chinese Taipei for political reasons)
- Pakistan

There are also six Asian associate members of World Rugby:

- Cambodia
- Kyrgyzstan
- Laos
- Thailand
- Uzbekistan
- Mongolia

Like Georgia and Russia, and as in football, Armenia, Azerbaijan and Israel play in Europe, though Kazakhstan does not.

The Arabian Gulf Rugby Football Union existed from 1974 to 2010 and its Arabian Gulf team represented five countries: Bahrain, Kuwait, Oman, Saudi Arabia and the United Arab Emirates. The body no longer exists.

== World Cup qualifying ==
=== 1991 World Cup ===
The 1991 World Cup was the first to operate a qualification system, the 1987 WC having been invitation-only. In the qualifying stage, Asia was combined with Oceania and given two berths. Only four countries took part; Japan, South Korea, Tonga and Western Samoa (Australia, Fiji and New Zealand were automatic qualifiers). Played as a four-team round-robin, Western Samoa and Japan finished first and second respectively courtesy of Japan's 28–16 win over Tonga, with the Japanese becoming the first Asian team to appear at the World Cup.

Although they lost their first two games and did not qualify for the quarter-finals, Japan secured third spot in their group with a 52–8 win over Zimbabwe.

=== 1995 World Cup ===
For the 1995 WC, Asia held its own tournament, with the winner qualifying for the finals. This time eight countries entered (Hong Kong, Japan, Malaysia, Singapore, South Korea, Sri Lanka, Taiwan and Thailand), and were split into two groups, with the winners of each group playing each other for the single qualification berth. The final play-off saw Japan beat South Korea 26–11.

The group stages showed the inequalities in the Asian game; Japan won 103–9 against Malaysia, whilst Hong Kong thrashed Singapore 164–13. The World Cup itself did little to showcase Asian rugby, as Japan lost every game, including a humiliating 145–17 defeat against the All Blacks.

=== 1999 World Cup ===
For the 1999 WC, Asia was given an extra qualification spot, albeit a repechage one. The same eight countries entered the qualification stages, but to avoid the scorelines witnessed in the previous competition, it was held on a three-stage basis; Singapore, Sri Lanka and Thailand competing in the first round-robin (with Sri Lanka going through); Malaysia, Sri Lanka and Taiwan in the second round (with Taiwan progressing); and then Hong Kong, Japan, South Korea and Taiwan in the third round. Japan again emerged victorious, with a 134–6 win over Taiwan going some way to regain the pride lost in the finals in South Africa four years earlier. South Korea took part in the repechage, beating Holland 108–45 on aggregate in the first round, before losing 140–41 over two legs to Tonga. Japan once again lost all their games in the World Cup proper.

=== 2003 World Cup ===
Asia retained its single berth plus repechage spot (vs. Oceania) in the 2003 WC qualifiers. This time, eleven teams took part, with the Arabian Gulf, China and Kazakhstan joining the fray.

Before Japan and South Korea entered the competition, the other nine teams were split into three round-robin pools, with the winners (China, Hong Kong and Taiwan) then playing another round-robin with the top team (Taiwan) going on to the final pool with Japan and South Korea, which would decide the automatic and repechage qualifying spots. Japan again emerged victorious, beating their previous score against Taiwan in a 155–3 win at home (their largest ever win), followed by a 120–3 scoreline in the away match. South Korea again finished second, also thrashing Taiwan 119–7, and repeated their previous repechage performance, losing 194–0 over two legs to the Tongans.

=== 2007 World Cup ===
Thirteen teams competed in the Asian qualifying tournament for the 2007 WC, Guam and India joining the competition for the first time.

Another new format was tried; this one more complex than previously; The first round, played in 2005, consisted of four "divisions"; 1, 2, 3a and 3b. In the second round, the top two of Division One (2005) and the winner of Division Two (2005) would form Division One (2006), whilst the bottom team of Division One (2005), the second (of three) in Division Two (2005), and the winner of a play-off between the Division 3a (2005) and Division 3b (2005) champions would form Division Two (2006). In the third round, the top two from Division One (2006) and the winner of Division Two (2006) would play a round-robin to decide the final placings.

Hong Kong, Japan and Korea formed Division One (2005), with Hong Kong finishing bottom and replaced by Arabian Gulf, who had won Division Two (2005). Taiwan finished bottom of Division Two, and were replaced by Sri Lanka, winners of the 3a-3b play-off over Kazakhstan. In the second round, Arabian Gulf finished bottom of Division One (2006), and were replaced in the final round by Hong Kong, who won Division Two (2006). In the final group, Japan again emerged victorious, sealing their place at the World Cup with a comprehensive 54–0 defeat of South Korea, who went on to lose to the Tongans for the third successive time, this time 85–3 in a one-off match in Wellington.

== See also ==
- Rugby union in Japan
- Rugby union in Hong Kong
