= 2015 U-19 Asia Rugby Championship =

Tournament details
- Host: Singapore
- Date: 13 – 19 December 2016
- Countries: 4

Final positions
- Champions: Hong Kong
- Relegated: Singapore

Tournament statistics
- Matches played: 6

The 2015 U-19 Asia Rugby Championship is an international rugby union competition for Under 20 national teams in Asia. The winners, Hong Kong, secured a berth at the 2016 World Rugby Under 20 Trophy by winning the top division.

== Top division ==
The top division was hosted by Singapore at the Yio Chu Kang Stadium from 13 to 19 December 2016.

Champions and qualification
for the 2016 World Rugby Under 20 Trophy.
Relegated

Position	Nation	Games				Points		
Position	Nation	Played	Won	Drawn	Lost	For	Against	Difference
1	Hong Kong	3	3	0	0	164	35	+129
2	Sri Lanka	3	2	0	1	87	48	+39
3	Chinese Taipei	3	1	0	2	45	141	-96
3	Singapore	3	0	0	3	38	109	-71
Source: ThePapare.com
