= 2012 ARFU Development Cup =

Tournament details
- Host: Philippines
- Venue: Manila
- Date: 14 & 16 June 2012
- Countries: Laos; Philippines; Thailand; Singapore
- Teams: 4

Final positions
- Champions: Singapore (1st title)
- Runner-up: Thailand
- Third place: Philippines
- Fourth place: Laos

Tournament statistics
- Matches played: 4

The 2012 ARFU Development Cup was the third edition of the Division II Championship, it was an official tournament for "developing" teams and was held in Manila, Philippines. After a tense match against Thailand that ended 21–19, Singapore was declared the winner.

== Standings ==
Pos	Team	Pld	W	D	L	PF	PA	PD	Pts
1	Singapore	2	2	0	0	95	19	+76	6
2	Thailand	2	1	0	1	69	35	+34	4
3	Philippines	2	1	0	1	69	50	+19	4
4	Laos	2	0	0	2	0	129	−129	2

== Bracket ==
Semi-finals
14 June – Manila
Laos	0
Singapore	74
14 June – Manila
Philippines	14
Thailand	50

Final
16 June – Manila
Singapore	21
Thailand	19
Third place
16 June - Manila
Philippines	55
Laos	0

== Results ==
=== Semi-finals ===
2012-06-14

Laos	0–74	Singapore

Manila, Philippines

2012-06-14

Philippines	14–50	Thailand

Manila, Philippines

=== Third place ===
2012-06-16

Philippines	55–0	Laos

Manila, Philippines

=== Final ===
2012-06-16

Singapore	21–19	Thailand

Manila, Philippines
