= Nomads Women's rugby team =

Nomads Women
- Full name: Nomads Rugby Football Club
- Nickname: Nomads
- Founded: 1993; 33 years ago
- Disbanded: 2017; 9 years ago

The Nomads Rugby Football Club was a British-based international invitational women's rugby union club.

The idea of the Nomads was based on the same concept of an invitational rugby scratch team first started by Barbarian F.C. in 1890 and since followed by several other notable clubs including the French Barbarians, Australian Barbarians, New Zealand Barbarians and South African Barbarians.

== History ==
The Nomads were created by former Great Britain and England women's rugby captain, and founding member of the Rugby Football Union for Women; Carol Isherwood in 1993, and were interchangeably known in the early days as the Premiership All Stars. The team was created to provide playing and social opportunities for players not involved in international competitions, and to provide an opposition for England A in preparation for the A team equivalent of the then Women's Five Nations.

Generally described as being the women's equivalent of the (then) men's rugby's Barbarians, teams included (as for the Barbarians) uncapped England players, older players and high-profile international players who were, at the time, playing in England. International players included names such as, for example; Fiona Coghlan, Bronwyn Mackintosh, Susie Appleby, Anna Richards and Non Evans.

Until 2008 all of their matches had taken place in England or Wales, against either England A or the Welsh national team. However, in the August 2008 a Nomad team toured outside the UK for the first time when they visited South Africa, playing two games against the national team as curtain raisers to two men's tri-nations internationals. It had originally been planned that Scotland would travel to South Africa, but when they had made other plans their then coach; Jo Hull, had suggest the Nomads attend instead.

By 2010, such was the Nomads success that the International Rugby Board ranked them 12th in the world at that time. Had the Nomads been a national team, this would have been high enough to qualify for the 2010 Women's Rugby World Cup.

The team played their final match in March 2017 against the British Army. The Nomads laid the foundation for the announcement in October 2017 of the first Women's Barbarian F.C. match. Whilst this sealed the fate of the Nomads as a team, their team manager; Fiona Stockley was central to the establishment of the Women's Barbarians team, who therefore effectively replaced the Nomads.

== Results summary ==
Rugby: Nomad matches 2003-2017
Opponent	First game	Played	Won	Drawn	Lost	Percentage
British Army	2016	2	2	0	0	100.00%
England A	1993	15	7	1	7	50.00%
South Africa	2008	6	2	0	4	33.33%
Scotland	2015	1	1	0	0	100.00%
Spain	2013	1	0	0	1	0.00%
United States	2007	1	1	0	0	100.00%
Wales	1993	4	3	0	1	75.00%
Summary 2003-2017		30	16	1	13	53.33%

== Nomad matches ==
1993-09-22

Nomads	10-15	Staines RFC

1995-09-02

Nomads	0-40	England

The Rock, Roehampton

2001-04-07

England A	24-5	Nomads

Franklin's Gardens, Northampton

2003-03-08

England A	15-15	Nomads

Monks Lane, Newbury

2003-10-25

Wales	15-20	Nomads

Memorial Ground, Bristol

2004-02-22

England A	18-5	Nomads

Monks Lane, Newbury

2004-03-05

England A	21-17	Nomads

Monks Lane, Newbury

2004-11-27

Wales	15-5	Nomads

Tyn y Wern (Glamorgan Sport Park), University of Glamorgan, Treforest

2005-02-26

England A	10-15	Nomads

Monks Lane, Newbury

2005-03-15

England A	19-14	Nomads

Imber Court, East Molesey

2005-11-19

Nomads	5-0	Wales

Bramley Sports Ground, Southgate

2006-02-26

England A	29-5	Nomads

Dry Leas, Henley-on-Thames

2006-03-18

England A	24-0	Nomads

The Woollam Playing Fields, St Albans

2007-01-07

Wales	12-19	Nomads

Maes Gwyn, Taff's Well

2007-03-16

England A	15-17	Nomads

Station Road, Cribbs Causeway

2007-08-12

Nomads	24-0	United States

RAF Halton, Halton

2008-02-02

England A	12-27	Nomads

The Avenue, Sunbury-on-Thames

2008-03-15

England A	15-24	Nomads

The Avenue, Sunbury-on-Thames

2008-08-09

South Africa	34-40	Nomads

Ellis Park, Johannesburg

2008-08-16

South Africa	0-29	Nomads

Newlands Stadium, Cape Town

2009-01-10

Nomads	cancelled	Wales XV

Twyford Avenue, Acton

2009-02-28

England A	7-14	Nomads

Molesey Road, Hersham

2009-03-21

England A	15-17	Nomads

Old Deer Park, Richmond

2010-01-16

Nomads	cancelled	Wales

Bramley Sports Ground, Southgate

2010-02-07

England A	12-10	Nomads

Molesey Road, Hersham

2010-03-13

England A	26-7	Nomads

Molesey Road, Hersham

2011-02-23

England A	19-22	Nomads

Molesey Road, Hersham

2012-06-23

South Africa	28-17	Nomads

Goodwood RFC, Cape Town

2012-06-30

South Africa	17-15	Nomads

Goodwood RFC, Cape Town

2013-02-23

Spain	29-19	Nomads

Las Mestas, Gijón

2014-06-28

Nomads	5-20	South Africa

Lensbury Club, Teddington

2014-07-01

Nomads	24-32	South Africa

Twyford Avenue, Acton

2015-01-03

Scotland	10-43	Nomads

Murrayfield Stadium, Edinburgh

2016-03-26

British Army (United Kingdom)	5-10	Nomads

Aldershot Military Stadium, Aldershot

2017-03-18

British Army (United Kingdom)	3-29	Nomads

Aldershot Military Stadium, Aldershot

== Squad ==
=== Squad for 2014 ===
Nomads squad for the tests against South Africa in London

Player	Position	Club	Union
Pippa Crews	Hooker	Worcester	England
Lindsey Smith	Hooker	Hillhead Jordanhill	Scotland
Tracey Balmer	Prop	Worcester	Scotland
Elisha Dee	Prop	Saracens	England
Laura Kapo	Prop	Richmond	England
Natalie Binstead	Lock	Wasps	England
Emilia Kristianson	Lock	Wasps	Sweden
Claire Phelps	Lock	Lakenham Hewett	England
Tess Forsberg	Flanker	Richmond	Scotland
Gemma Hallett	Flanker	Pontyclun	Wales
Harriet Millar-Mills	Flanker	Lichfield	England
Zoe Saynor	Flanker	Bristol	England
Laura Quinn	Number 8	Exiles	Irish
Catherine Spencer	Number 8	Bristol	England
Tina Lee	Scrum-half	Wasps	England
Louise Dalgleish	Fly-half	Cougars	Scotland
Lisa Campbell	Centre	Lichfield	New Zealand
Vicki Jackson	Centre	Wasps	England
Gemma Rowland	Centre	Wasps	Wales
Bethany Stott	Centre	Waterloo	England
Hannah Edwards	Centre-Wing	Wasps	England
Sam Bree	Wing	Worcester	England
Lynsey Douglas	Wing	Wasps	Scotland
Sarah Mills	Wing	Wasps	England
Steph Johnson	Fullback	Worcester	Scotland

=== Squad for 2015 ===
Nomads squad for the tests against Scotland in Edinburgh

Player	Position	Club	Union
Pippa Crews	Hooker	Worcester	England
Sarah Mimnagh	Hooker	Wasps	Ireland
Fiona Coghlan	Prop	UL Bohemians	Ireland
Sophie Hemming	Prop	Bristol	England
Claire Purdy	Prop	Wasps	England
Lindsey Wheeler	Lock	Cougars	Scotland
Dalena Dennison	Lock	Wasps	Australia
Emilia Kristianson	Lock	Wasps	Sweden
Jane Leonard	Flanker	Wasps	England
Ruth Nash	Flanker	Sharks	England
Charlie Veale	Flanker	Wasps	Scotland
Claire Phelps	Number 8	Lakenham Hewett	England
Catherine Spencer	Number 8	Bristol	England
Lynne Cantwell	Scrum-half	Richmond	Ireland
Tina Lee	Scrum-half	Wasps	England
Louise Dalgleish	Fly-half	Cougars	Scotland
Megan Goddard	Fly-half	Worcester	England
Emilie Bydwell	Centre	San Diego Surfers	USA
Lisa Campbell	Centre	Worcester	New Zealand
Vicki Jackson	Centre	Wasps	England
Claire Davies	Wing	Lampeter Town	England
Sarah Mills	Wing	Redditch	England
Jade Wong	Wing	Richmond	Ireland
Tess Gard'ner	Fullback	Wasps	England
Gemma Rowland	Fullback	Wasps	Wales

=== Notable former players ===
Australia

- Bronwyn Mackintosh

Canada

- Araba Chintoh
- Leslie Cripps
- Julia Sugawara

England

- Susie Appleby
- Fiona Britten
- Pippa Crews
- Sue Day
- Helen Harding
- Sophie Hemming
- Vicki Jackson
- Kate Knight
- Sarah McKenna
- Harriet Millar-Mills
- Alex Pilkington
- Jo Poore
- Claire Purdy
- Shelley Rae
- Selena Rudge
- Gemma Sharples
- Catherine Spencer
- Georgia Stevens
- Fiona Stockley

Ireland

- Lynne Cantwell
- Fiona Coghlan
- Jackie Shiels

New Zealand

- Lauren Engebretsen
- Anna Richards

Samoa

- Amanda Cahill

Scotland

- Susie Brown

United States

- Emilie Bydwell

Wales

- Liza Burgess
- Nic Evans
- Non Evans
- Gemma Hallett
- Gemma Rowland
- Naomi Thomas
- Sian Williams

== Club staff ==
- (England) Fiona Stockley – Manager (2003-2017)
- (England) Giselle Mather - Coach (2012)

== Playing kit ==
By 2003, the club's full kit assets consisted of 23 shirts; no shorts, no socks, no balls. The full kit could be stored in a cupboard in Fiona Stockley's home.

=== Socks ===
The Nomads followed a similar tradition, in relation to socks, to that of the Barbarians, in that Nomad players were asked to wear one sock from their club, and the other from their country.

== See also ==
Barbarian F.C.
