= 2018 Asia Rugby Women's Championship Div 1 =

2018 Asia Rugby Division 1
Tournament details
- Host: Singapore
- Venue: Queenstown Stadium
- Date: 2 June – 8 June 2018
- Teams: 3

Final positions
- Champions: Singapore
- Runner-up: Philippines
- Third place: India

The 2018 Asia Rugby Women’s Championship Div 1 was hosted by Singapore at the Queenstown Stadium, from 2 June to 8 June. India made their international debut in the opening match against Singapore. Although active in rugby sevens, India did not have a fifteens team; fifteens was only initiated at the end of 2016. Singapore defeated the Philippines to win the Division 1 title.

== Standings ==
Pos	Team	Pld	W	D	L	PF	PA	PD
1	Singapore	2	2	0	0	49	15	+34
2	Philippines	2	1	0	1	29	24	+5
3	India	2	0	0	2	10	49	–39

== Results ==
=== Round 1 ===
2018-06-02

Singapore	30–5	India

Queenstown Stadium, Singapore

FB	15	Xin Yi Goh
RW	14	Min Han Tse
OC	13	Wong Yilin
IC	12	Elly Syazwani Sudira
LW	11	Jessie Yuen Choi Sum
FH	10	Yiting Zheng
SH	9	Esther Phua Lu En
N8	8	Annabel Woo Xue Ni
OF	7	Yi Tian Lee (c)
BF	6	Ke Lin
RL	5	Anna Chen Jiemin
LL	4	Shu Hui Teo
TP	3	Crystal Cheng Mei Qi
HK	2	Mei Giet Koh
LP	1	Mery Ong
Replacements:
	16	Anggit Fernanda
	17	Jackie Osborn
	18	Ka Yan Chan
	19	Diyana Zaharin
	20	Jiajia Chen
	21	Nicole Tan Zhi Yu
	22	Finna Tan Mei
	23	Daphne Lai Fen-Ting
Coach:
Muhammad Zaki Mahmood

FB	15	Sandhya Rai
RW	14	Hupi Mahji
OC	13	Neha Pardeshi
IC	12	Vahbiz Bharucha (c)
LW	11	Swapna Oraon
FH	10	Meerarani Hembram
SH	9	Sumitra Nayak
N8	8	Namita Namita
OF	7	Priya Bansal
BF	6	Sangita Bera
RL	5	Suman Oraon
LL	4	Jyoti Choudhary
TP	3	Neha Neha
HK	2	Sanjukta Munda
LP	1	Saloni Prachande
Replacements:
	16	Laxmipriya Sahu
	17	Ann Matthew
	18	Bhagyalaxmi Barik
	19	Himani Dutt
	20	Subhalaxmi Barik
	21	Parbati Kisku
	22	Chanda Oraon
	23	Sweety Kumari
Coach:
Nasser Hussain

=== Round 2 ===
2018-06-05

India	5–19	Philippines

Queenstown Stadium, Singapore

FB	15	Sandhya Rai
RW	14	Hupi Mahji
OC	13	Neha Pardeshi
IC	12	Vahbiz Bharucha (c)
LW	11	Swapna Oraon
FH	10	Meerarani Hembram
SH	9	Sumitra Nayak
N8	8	Subhalaxmi Barik
OF	7	Priya Bansal
BF	6	Sangita Bera
RL	5	Himani Dutt
LL	4	Jyoti Choudhary
TP	3	Neha Neha
HK	2	Bhagyalaxmi Barik
LP	1	Saloni Prachande
Replacements:
	16	Laxmipriya Sahu
	17	Ann Matthew
	18	Priya Priya
	19	Claudia Crizzle
	20	Rajani Sabar
	21	Parbati Kisku
	22	Chanda Oraon
	23	Sweety Kumari
Coach:
Nasser Hussain

FB	15	Agot Danton
RW	14	Anna Pacis
OC	13	Aiumi Ono (c)
IC	12	Sylvia Tudoc
LW	11	Kaye Honoras
FH	10	Rassiel Sales
SH	9	Angella San Juan
N8	8	Helena Indigne
OF	7	Nicole Kovanen
BF	6	Tanya Bird
RL	5	Jessica Asentista
LL	4	Katrina Andrews
TP	3	Jane Francisco
HK	2	Madille Salinas
LP	1	Isabella Nepomuceno
Replacements:
	16	Eloisa Jordan
	17	Ada Milby
	18	Genieli Dela Cruz
	19	Mary Muyco
	20	Kaia Baui
	21	Leanor Boroy
	22	Gelanie Gamba
	23	Dixie Yu
Coach:
Clifford Dawson

=== Round 3 ===
2018-06-08

Singapore	19–10	Philippines

Queenstown Stadium, Singapore

FB	15	Xin Yi Goh
RW	14	Min Han Tse
OC	13	Yiting Zheng
IC	12	Elly Syazwani Sudira
LW	11	Jessie Yuen Choi Sum
FH	10	Wong Yilin
SH	9	Esther Phua Lu En
N8	8	Annabel Woo Xue Ni
OF	7	Yi Tian Lee (c)
BF	6	Ke Lin
RL	5	Anna Chen Jiemin
LL	4	Shu Hui Teo
TP	3	Mery Ong
HK	2	Mei Giet Koh
LP	1	Crystal Cheng Mei Qi
Replacements:
	16	Anggit Fernanda
	17	Hidayah Jemin
	18	Zulaiqah Rahim
	19	Diyana Zaharin
	20	Zahra'a Ya'akob
	21	Nicole Tan Zhi Yu
	22	Sabrina Azmi
	23	Daphne Lai Fen-Ting
Coach:
Muhammad Zaki Mahmood

FB	15	Agot Danton
RW	14	Anna Pacis
OC	13	Aiumi Ono (c)
IC	12	Sylvia Tudoc
LW	11	Gelanie Gamba
FH	10	Rassiel Sales
SH	9	Angella San Juan
N8	8	Tanya Bird
OF	7	Nicole Kovanen
BF	6	Mary Muyco
RL	5	Helena Indigne
LL	4	Katrina Andrews
TP	3	Jane Francisco
HK	2	Madille Salinas
LP	1	Isabella Nepomuceno
Replacements:
	16	Ada Milby
	17	Genieli Dela Cruz
	18	Eloisa Jordan
	19	Dixie Yu
	20	Jessica Asentista
	21	Kaye Honoras
	22	Jheewel Idea
	23	Leanor Boroy
Coach:
Clifford Dawson
