= 2026 SEARF Women's Championship =

Tournament details
- Host: Malaysia
- Date: 8 February 2026–14 February 2026
- Countries: Malaysia; Philippines; Singapore
- Teams: 3

Final positions
- Champions: Malaysia
- Runner-up: Singapore

Tournament statistics
- Matches played: 3
- Tries scored: 27 (9 per match)

The 2026 SEARF Women's Championship is the first edition of Southeast Asia Rugby Federation's competition for women's national rugby union teams. The tournament was hosted by Malaysia, it kicked off on 8 February 2026 and concluded on 14 February 2026.

Malaysia won the inaugural Championship after beating the Philippines in the final match.

== Standings ==
Pos	Team	P	W	D	L	PF	PA	PD	TF	TA	TD	TBP	DBP	Pts
1	Malaysia	2	1	1	0	93	15	78	15	3	12	0	0	2
2	Singapore	2	1	1	0	66	15	51	12	3	9	0	0	2
3	Philippines	2	0	0	2	0	129	-129	0	21	-21	0	0	0

== Results ==
8 February 2026
16:00 MST (UTC+8)

Malaysia	15–15	Singapore
Try: Maslina Ahmad Ismail (2) 19' m, 48' m Nur Alyia Nabila Binti Samsubahari 73' m		Try: Rachel Li Ting Tan 7' m Felicia Zehong Cheng 28' m Syirin Binte Hashim 80' m

Padang Astaka, Petaling Jaya
Referee: Sunny Lee (HKRU)

11 February 2026
16:00 MST (UTC+8)

(1BP) Singapore	51–0	Philippines
Try: Angelina Hui Yun Liu 3' m Dawn Yi Ning Tan 7' m Pei Yi Ong 11' m Crystal Mei Qi Tao 25' c Choi Sum Jessie Yuen 30' c Sherienne Jia Li Koh 56' c Hannah Mei Lin Tan 63' m Min Yan Tse 70' m Ayu Arissa Binte Zulkifli 80' m Con: Choi Sum Jessie Yuen (3) 26', 32', 57'

Padang Astaka, Petaling Jaya
Referee: Sunny Lee (HKRU)

14 February 2026
16:00 MST (UTC+8)

Philippines	0–78	Malaysia
	report

Padang Astaka, Petaling Jaya
