= 2019 Asia Rugby Women's Championship Div 1 =

2019 Asia Rugby Division 1
Tournament details
- Host: Philippines
- Venue: Southern Plains Sports Field
- Date: 19 June – 22 June 2019
- Teams: 4

Final positions
- Champions: China
- Runner-up: Philippines
- Third place: Singapore
- Fourth place: India

The 2019 Asia Rugby Women's Championship Div 1 was held from 19 to 22 June in Calamba, Philippines. China won the Division 1 Championship after beating the Philippines in the Final. India also created history when they defeated Singapore to record their first test match victory.

China progressed to a play-off with Kazakhstan, which was also a 2021 Women's Rugby World Cup qualifier. The winner was promoted to the 2020 Asia Rugby Women's Championship. The competition will see one team qualify directly for the 2021 Rugby World Cup in New Zealand.

== Division 1 Championship ==
=== Semi-finals ===
2019-06-19

| Singapore | 7–59 | China |

Southern Plains Sports Field, Calamba

2019-06-19

| Philippines | 32–27 | India |

Southern Plains Sports Field, Calamba

=== 3rd Place ===
2019-06-22

| Singapore | 19–21 | India |

Southern Plains Sports Field, Calamba

=== Final ===
2019-06-22

| China | 68–0 | Philippines |

Southern Plains Sports Field, Calamba

== Promotion Playoff ==
Playoff for promotion to the 2020 Asia Rugby Women's Championship.

2019-07-31

| China | 13–8 | Kazakhstan |

Jiujiang Stadium

2019-08-03

| China | 0–15 | Kazakhstan |

Jiujiang Stadium

Kazakhstan advanced after defeating China on aggregate scores in a two-game series in which each team won a match.
