= 2007 ARFU Women's Rugby Championship =

Tournament details
- Host: China
- Venue: Kunming
- Date: 2 & 4 November
- Countries: China; Japan; Kazakhstan; Singapore
- Teams: 4

Final positions
- Champions: Kazakhstan (1st title)
- Runner-up: China
- Third place: Japan
- Fourth place: Singapore

Tournament statistics
- Matches played: 4

The 2007 ARFU Women's Rugby Championship was the second edition of the tournament. It was hosted by China again, in Kunming and took place on the 2nd and 4 November. It featured two new teams — Japan and Kazakhstan, with hosts, China, and Singapore. Kazakhstan defeated defending champions, China, 34–5 to win the tournament.

== Standings ==
Pos	Team	Pld	W	D	L	PF	PA	PD
1	Kazakhstan	2	2	0	0	45	11	+34
2	China	2	1	0	1	44	40	+4
3	Japan	2	1	0	1	26	18	+8
4	Singapore	2	0	0	2	13	59	–46

== Bracket ==
Semi-finals
2 November – Kunming
China	39
Singapore	6
2 November – Kunming
Japan	6
Kazakhstan	11

Final
4 November – Kunming
China	5
Kazakhstan	34
Third place
4 November – Kunming
Japan	20
Singapore	7

== Results ==
=== Semi-finals ===
2007-11-02

China	39–6	Singapore

Kunming

2007-11-02

Japan	6–10	Kazakhstan

Kunming

=== 3rd place playoff ===
2007-11-04

Japan	20–7	Singapore

Kunming

=== Final ===
2007-11-04

China	5–34	Kazakhstan

Kunming
