= 2011 ARFU Development Cup =

Tournament details
- Host: Laos
- Venue: Chao Anou Vong Stadium, Vientiane
- Date: 24 November 2011–26 November 2011
- Countries: China; Laos; Philippines; Thailand
- Teams: 4

Final positions
- Champions: China (1st title)
- Runner-up: Thailand
- Third place: Philippines
- Fourth place: Laos

Tournament statistics
- Matches played: 6

The 2011 ARFU Development Cup was the second edition of the tournament. It was an official tournament for developing teams. There was no Division I tournament. The games were played in Vientiane, Laos, from the 24th to the 26th of November. Each game lasted for 60 minutes.

== Standings ==
Pos	Team	Pld	W	D	L	PF	PA	PD	Pts
1	China	3	3	0	0	140	0	+140	9
2	Thailand	3	2	0	1	77	38	+39	7
3	Philippines	3	1	0	2	20	87	−67	5
4	Laos	3	0	0	3	12	124	−112	3

Source: http://www.rugbyarchive.net/compseasons/3026?Stagione=2011

== Results ==
2011-11-24

Laos	0–38	Thailand

Chao Anou Vong stadium, Vientiane, Laos

2011-11-24

China	36–0	Philippines

Chao Anou Vong stadium, Vientiane, Laos

2011-11-25

Thailand	39–0	Philippines

Chao Anou Vong stadium, Vientiane, Laos

2011-11-25

Laos	0–66	China

Chao Anou Vong stadium, Vientiane, Laos

2011-11-26

Laos	12–20	Philippines

Chao Anou Vong stadium, Vientiane, Laos

2011-11-26

China	38–0	Thailand

Chao Anou Vong stadium, Vientiane, Laos
