= 2006 ARFU Women's Rugby Championship =

Tournament details
- Host: China
- Venue: Kunming
- Date: 17 & 19 November 2006
- Countries: China; Hong Kong; Singapore; Thailand
- Teams: 4

Final positions
- Champions: China (1st title)
- Runner-up: Hong Kong
- Third place: Thailand
- Fourth place: Singapore

Tournament statistics
- Matches played: 4

The 2006 ARFU Women's Rugby Championship was the inaugural edition of the tournament. The competition occurred on the 17th and 19th of November, and was held in Kunming, China. Four teams competed in the tournament — hosts, China, with Hong Kong, Thailand, and Singapore. China won the competition after beating Hong Kong 31–7 in the final.

== Standings ==
Pos	Team	Pld	W	D	L	PF	PA	PD
1	China	2	2	0	0	84	18	+66
2	Hong Kong	2	1	0	1	19	31	–12
3	Thailand	2	1	0	1	31	53	–22
4	Singapore	2	0	0	2	0	32	–32

== Bracket ==
Semi-finals
17 November – Kunming
China	53
Thailand	11
17 November – Kunming
Hong Kong	12
Singapore	0

Final
19 November – Kunming
China	31
Hong Kong	7
Third place
19 November – Kunming
Thailand	20
Singapore	0

== Results ==
=== Semi-finals ===
2006-11-17

China	53–11	Thailand

Kunming

2006-11-17

Hong Kong	12–0	Singapore

Kunming

=== 3rd–4th place playoff ===
2006-11-19

Thailand	20–0	Singapore

Kunming

=== Final ===
2006-11-19

China	31–7	Hong Kong

Kunming
