= Yio Chu Kang Stadium =

Stadium in Singapore

- Pusat Sukan Yio Chu Kang (Malay) 杨厝港体育场 (Chinese) இயோ சூ காங் விளையாட்டரங்கம் (Tamil)
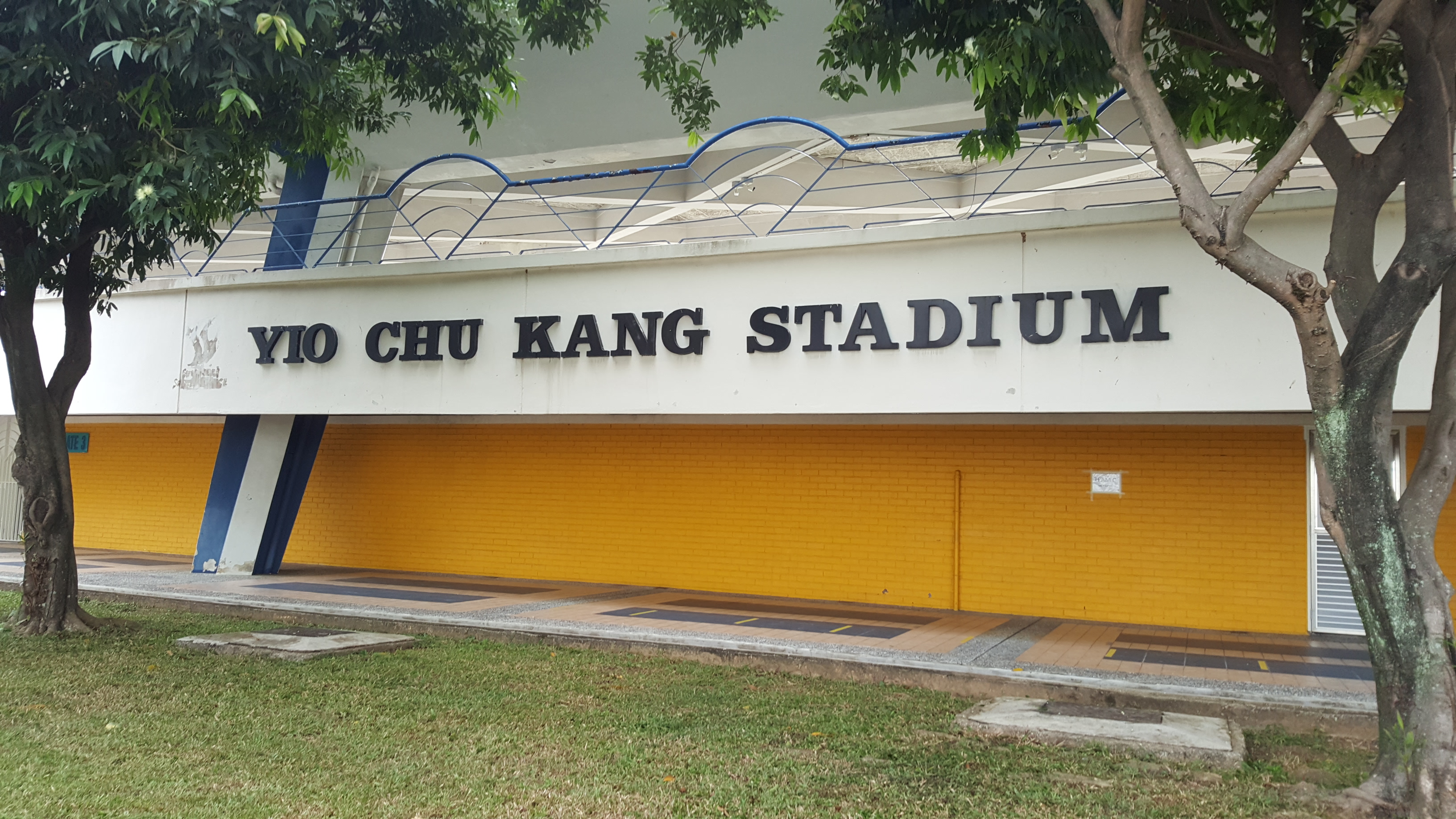
- Yio Chu Kang Stadium
- Interactive map of Yio Chu Kang Stadium
- Full name: Yio Chu Kang ActiveSG Stadium
- Address: 210 Ang Mo Kio Avenue 9, Singapore 569777
- Location: Yio Chu Kang, Singapore
- Coordinates: 1.383312°N 103.846401°E
- Owner: Sport Singapore
- Operator: Sport Singapore
- Capacity: 2,000
- Surface: Grass
- Public transit: NS15 Yio Chu Kang

Construction
- Opened: 1 April 1985; 41 years ago

Yio Chu Kang Stadium is a multi-purpose stadium with a seating capacity of 2,000 in Yio Chu Kang, Singapore. As the stadium's playing field is primarily configured for rugby, it is used by several local rugby football clubs (RFCs) for matches. The stadium is generally not used by the Football Association of Singapore (FAS) for football matches.

The stadium is managed by Sport Singapore, and like most stadiums in Singapore, it is generally open to the public daily from 4.30am till 9.30pm, unless exclusively booked. Its facilities include a rugby field, an eight-lane running track, several athletics facilities, and a fitness corner.

The stadium has also occasionally served as a venue for presidential and general election rallies, as well as post election assemblies. Political parties that have held such events at the stadium include the ruling People's Action Party (PAP), and various opposition parties including People's Power Party, and Singapore People's Party.

== History ==
Yio Chu Kang Stadium is part of the Yio Chu Kang Sport Centre, a community sports complex comprising Yio Chu Kang Sports Hall, Yio Chu Kang Swimming Complex, and Yio Chu Kang Squash and Tennis Centre. The completed sports centre was handed over to the Singapore Sports Council on 11 March 1985, and subsequently opened to the public on 1 April 1985.

From 13 to 19 December 2015, Yio Chu Kang Stadium hosted the 2015 U-19 Asia Rugby Championship, featuring teams from Singapore, Hong Kong, Sri Lanka, and Taiwan. The teams competed for qualification to the 2016 World Rugby Under 20 Trophy, with the winner of the matches securing a place in the tournament. Singapore lost all three of its matches and finished at the bottom of the table. The tournament marked the first time Singapore had hosted the championship.

On 7 December 2019, the stadium hosted the Special Olympics South-east Asia Unified 5-a-side Football Tournament, seven years after the tournament's inauguration. The event brought together nearly 140 participants from seven countries in the region.

In 2024, the Urban Redevelopment Authority (URA) proposed redeveloping Yio Chu Kang Sports Centre, including the stadium. The existing site is planned to accommodate refreshed sports, wellness, and healthcare facilities, with the adjacent land proposed for development as a community node. The following year, the Ministry of Culture, Community and Youth (MCCY) announced plans that the stadium will be designated as a Para Sports Hub supporting para-athletes in athletics and badminton. Both initiatives are part of plans to create a more inclusive neighbourhood.

== See also ==
- List of stadiums in Singapore
