= Malaysia women's national rugby union team =

Malaysia
- Union: Malaysia Rugby
First colours	Second colours

World Rugby ranking
- Current: 41 (as of 23 March 2026)
- Highest: 41 (2026)
- Lowest: 43 (2026)

First international
- Malaysia 15–15 Singapore (8 February 2026)

Biggest win
- Malaysia 78–0 Philippines (14 February 2026)
- Website: Official website

The Malaysia women's national rugby union team represents Malaysia in rugby union. They played their first international match in 2026.

== History ==
Malaysia played their first non-international match against Singapore on 3 October 2009 at the Yio Chu Kang Stadium in Singapore. In 2010, Malaysia were beaten by Hong Kong in their largest defeat, the score was 81–0.

Malaysia was expected to make their international debut in December 2024 at the Asia Rugby Women's Championship Division 1 competition, but the tournament was cancelled.

In 2026, Malaysia won the inaugural SEARF Women's Championship after beating the Philippines in the final match.

== Record ==
Opponent	First game	Played	Won	Drawn	Lost	Percentage
Philippines	2026	1	1	0	0	100%
Singapore	2026	1	0	1	0	0.00%
Summary		2	1	1	0	50%

=== International matches ===
Won	Lost	Draw

Test	Date	Opponent	PF	PA	Venue	Event
1	2026-02-08	Singapore	15	15	Padang Astaka, Petaling Jaya	SEARF Women's Championship
2	2026-02-14	Philippines	78	0	Padang Astaka, Petaling Jaya	SEARF Women's Championship

=== Non-International matches ===
Date	Malaysia	PF	PA	Opponent	Venue	Ref
2009-09-05	Malaysian Barbarians	7	10	Singapore	Kuala Lumpur	
2009-10-03	Malaysia	0	63	Singapore	Yio Chu Kang Stadium, Singapore	
2010-04-17	Malaysian Barbarians	10	5	Singapore	Yio Chu Kang	
2010-12-18	Malaysia	0	81	Hong Kong	Royal Selangor Club, Kuala Lumpur	
