= Philippine Rugby Football Union =

Rugby Governing Body in Philippines

- Sport: Rugby union
- Founded: 1998; 27 years ago
- World Rugby affiliation: 2004
- Asia Rugby affiliation: 2002
- President: Ada Milby
- Men's coach: Stu Woodhouse
- Women's coach: Andy Brown
- Sevens coach: Darryl Suasua (men's); Fitz Taua'a (women's)
- Website: www.philippines.rugby

The Philippine Rugby Football Union (PRFU) is the governing body for rugby union in the Philippines. It was founded on January 19, 1998 and became affiliated to the International Rugby Board on, November 1, 2004.

== See also ==
- Philippines national rugby union team
- Philippines National Rugby League
