= Laos National Stadium =

Multi-purpose stadium in Vientiane, Laos

Coordinates: 17°58′07″N 102°36′29″E

Anouvong Stadium
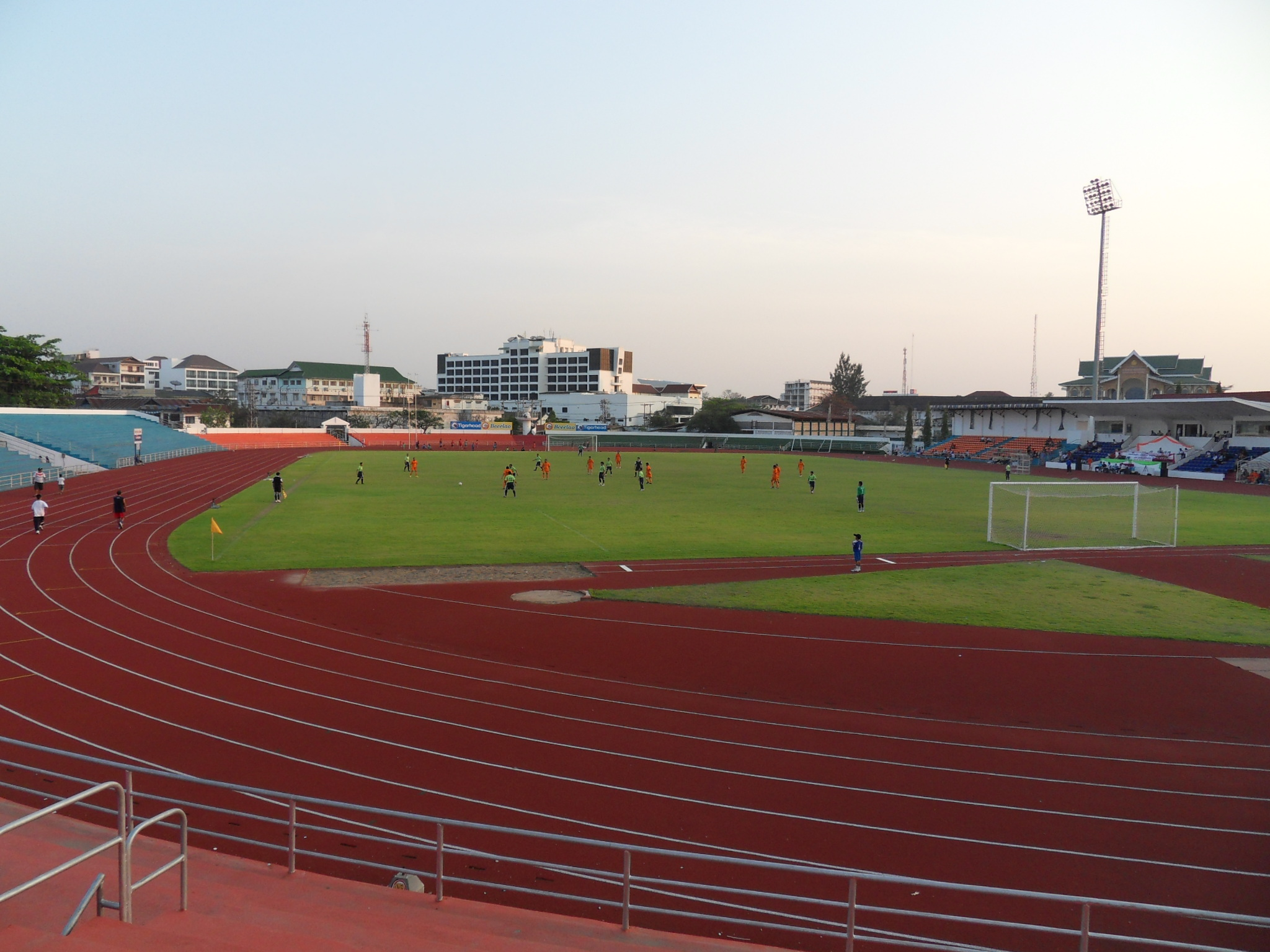
- Interactive map of Anouvong Stadium
- Location: Vientiane, Laos
- Capacity: 20,000
- Surface: Grass
- Field size: 95 m × 60 m (312 ft × 197 ft)

Construction
- Renovated: March 2008; 2025–present
- Closed: 2025

Tenants
- Various Lao League matches Laos

The Laos National Stadium or formally Anouvong Stadium (official name), also known as Vientiane Provincial stadium, is a multi-purpose stadium in Vientiane, Laos. It is named after Chao Anouvong, King of Vientiane. It is used mostly for football matches. The stadium holds 20,000 people. Since 2008, some matches of the Lao League have been played there.

The stadium is temporarily closed for the renovations since 2025.
