= India women's national rugby union team =

India
- Union: Rugby India
- Head coach: Waisale Serevi
- Captain: Vahbiz Bharucha
First colours

World Rugby ranking
- Current: 56 (as of 2 March 2026)
- Highest: 50 (2024)
- Lowest: 56 (2026)

First international
- Singapore 30–5 India (Singapore 2 June 2018)

Biggest win
- Singapore 19–21 India (Calamba, Philippines 19 June 2019)

Biggest defeat
- Singapore 30–5 India (Singapore 2 June 2018)

The India women's national rugby union team is the national team representing India in women's international rugby union. They played their first test against Singapore in 2018. They have only played four Tests to date and are ranked 56th by World Rugby.

== Record ==
=== Overall ===
(Full internationals only)

Rugby: India internationals 2018-
Opponent	First game	Played	Won	Drawn	Lost	Percentage
Philippines	2018	2	0	0	2	0.00%
Singapore	2018	2	1	0	1	50.00%
Summary	2018	4	1	0	3	25.00%

=== Full internationals ===
Won	Lost	Draw

Test	Date	Opponent	PF	PA	Venue	Event	Ref.
1	2018-06-02	Singapore	5	30	Queenstown Stadium, Singapore	2018 ARWC D1	
2	2018-06-05	Philippines	5	19	Queenstown Stadium, Singapore	2018 ARWC D1	
3	2019-06-19	Philippines	27	32	Southern Plains Sports Field, Calamba	2019 ARWC D1	
4	2019-06-22	Singapore	21	19	Southern Plains Sports Field, Calamba	2019 ARWC D1	
