= Laos women's national rugby union team =

Laos
- Union: Lao Rugby Federation

First international
- Laos 0–38 Thailand (Anouvong Stadium, Vientiane; 24 November 2011)

Biggest defeat
- Singapore 74–0 Laos (Eagle's Nest Stadium, Quezon City; 14 June 2012)

The Laos women's national rugby union team is a national sporting side that represents Laos in women's rugby union. It first played international sevens rugby in 2007 at the South East Asia sevens, where it finished third. It then played a ten-a-side international against Cambodia in 2009, and in 2010 it won a non-test match developmental tournament involving Thailand and the Philippines. Its first full test was against Thailand in 2011.

== Results summary ==
(Full internationals only, updated to 28 May 2023)

Laos Internationals From 2011
Opponent	First Match	Played	Won	Drawn	Lost	For	Against	Win %
China	2011	1	0	0	1	0	66	0.00%
Philippines	2011	2	0	0	2	12	75	0.00%
Singapore	2012	1	0	0	1	0	74	0.00%
Thailand	2011	1	0	0	1	0	38	0.00%
Summary	2011	5	0	0	5	12	253	0.00%

== Results ==
=== Full internationals ===
Won	Lost	Draw

Test	Date	Laos	Score	Opponent	Venue	Event	Ref
1	24 November 2011	Laos	0–38	Thailand	Anouvong Stadium, Vientiane	2011 Asian Division II Championship	
2	25 November 2011	Laos	0–66	China	Anouvong Stadium, Vientiane	2011 Asian Division II Championship	
3	26 November 2011	Laos	12–20	Philippines	Anouvong Stadium, Vientiane	2011 Asian Division II Championship	
4	14 June 2012	Laos	0–74	Singapore	Eagle's Nest Stadium, Quezon City	2012 Asian Division II Championship	
5	16 June 2012	Laos	0–55	Philippines	Eagle's Nest Stadium, Quezon City	2012 Asian Division II Championship	
