= China women's national rugby union team =

China
- Union: Chinese Rugby Football Association

World Rugby ranking
- Current: 28 (as of 2 March 2026)
- Highest: 22 (2023)
- Lowest: 28 (2025, 2026)

First international
- China 53–11 Thailand (2006)

Biggest win
- China 68–0 Philippines (2019)

Biggest defeat
- China 0–51 Kazakhstan (2012)

The China women's national rugby union team represents China internationally in rugby union. They played their first test match in 2006 and compete in the Asia Rugby Women's Championship and its divisional tournaments.

== History ==
China played their first test match in 2006 against Thailand in the Asia Rugby Women's Championship. They were victorious with a 53–11 thrashing of Thailand. They eventually won the 2006 Asia Women's Championship. In 2007 they were runners-up after losing 34–5 to Kazakhstan in the final of the Asian Championship.

== Record ==
(Full internationals only)

Rugby: China internationals 2006-
Opponent	First game	Played	Won	Drawn	Lost	Percentage
Hong Kong	2006	2	1	0	1	50%
Kazakhstan	2007	4	1	0	3	25%
Laos	2011	1	1	0	0	100%
Philippines	2011	2	2	0	0	100%
Singapore	2007	2	2	0	0	100%
Thailand	2006	2	2	0	0	100%
Summary	2005	13	9	0	4	69.23%
