= Thailand women's national rugby union team =

Sports team representing Thailand

Thailand
- Union: Thai Rugby Union

World Rugby ranking
- Current: 57 (as of 2 March 2026)
- Highest: 53
- Lowest: 57 (2026)

First international
- Thailand 0–67 Kazakhstan (Bangkok; 3 June 2005)

Biggest win
- Philippines 0–39 Thailand (Anouvong Stadium, Vientiane; 25 November 2011)

Biggest defeat
- Thailand 0–67 Kazakhstan (Bangkok; 3 June 2005)

The Thailand women's national rugby union team are a national sporting side that represents Thailand in women's international rugby union. They played their first test match against Kazakhstan in 2005.

== Results summary ==
(Full internationals only, updated to 24 April 2023)

Thailand Internationals From 2005
| Opponent | First Match | Played | Won | Drawn | Lost | For | Against | Win % |
|---|---|---|---|---|---|---|---|---|
| China | 2006 | 2 | 0 | 0 | 2 | 11 | 91 | 0.00% |
| Hong Kong | 2005 | 1 | 1 | 0 | 0 | 20 | 18 | 100.00% |
| Kazakhstan | 2005 | 1 | 0 | 0 | 1 | 0 | 67 | 0.00% |
| Laos | 2011 | 1 | 1 | 0 | 0 | 38 | 0 | 100.00% |
| Philippines | 2011 | 2 | 2 | 0 | 0 | 89 | 15 | 100.00% |
| Singapore | 2006 | 2 | 1 | 0 | 1 | 39 | 21 | 50.00% |
| Summary | 2005 | 9 | 5 | 0 | 4 | 197 | 212 | 55.56% |

== Results ==
=== Full internationals ===
| Won | Lost | Draw |

| Test | Date | PF | PA | Opponent | Venue | Event | Ref |
|---|---|---|---|---|---|---|---|
| 1 | 3 June 2005 | 0 | 67 | Kazakhstan | Bangkok | 2006 World Cup Qualifier | |
| 2 | 5 June 2005 | 20 | 18 | Hong Kong | Bangkok | 2006 World Cup Qualifier | |
| 3 | 17 November 2006 | 11 | 53 | China | Kunming | 2006 ARFU Championship | |
| 4 | 19 November 2006 | 20 | 0 | Singapore | Kunming | 2006 ARFU Championship | |
| 5 | 24 November 2011 | 38 | 0 | Laos | Anouvong Stadium, Vientiane | 2011 Asian Division II Championship | |
| 6 | 25 November 2011 | 39 | 0 | Philippines | Anouvong Stadium, Vientiane | 2011 Asian Division II Championship | |
| 7 | 26 November 2011 | 0 | 38 | China | Anouvong Stadium, Vientiane | 2011 Asian Division II Championship | |
| 8 | 14 June 2012 | 50 | 15 | Philippines | Eagle's Nest Stadium, Quezon City | 2012 Asian Division II Championship | |
| 9 | 16 June 2012 | 19 | 21 | Singapore | Eagle's Nest Stadium, Quezon City | 2012 Asian Division II Championship | |

== See also ==
- Rugby union in Thailand
