= Philippines women's national rugby union team =

Philippines
- Nickname: Volcanoes
- Union: Philippine Rugby Football Union
First colours

World Rugby ranking
- Current: 65 (as of 2 March 2026)
- Highest: 60
- Lowest: 65 (2026)

First international
- Philippines 0–36 China (Anouvong Stadium, Vientiane; 24 November 2011)

Biggest win
- Philippines 55–0 Laos (Eagle's Nest Stadium, Quezon City; 16 June 2012)

Biggest defeat
- Malaysia 78–0 Philippines (SEARFC; 14 February 2026)

The Philippines women's national rugby union team, nicknamed the Volcanoes represents the Philippines in women's rugby union. They played their first international on 24 November 2011 against China.

== History ==
The Philippines played their first fifteens rugby in non-test matches in a developmental tournament involving Laos and Thailand. Their first test match was against China at the 2011 Asian Division II Championship. They hosted the 2012 Asian Division II Championship in Manila.

They went on a hiatus from full 11-a-side rugby until 2018, when they competed in the Division I Asian Championships. In 2019 the Philippine Rugby Football Union removed “Lady” from its national women's fifteens and sevens team names. The decision was in line with World Rugby and Asia Rugby to drop gender titles in their competition names.

The team went into a hiatus again for seven years, until the 2026 SEARF Women's Championship.

== Results summary ==
(Full internationals only, updated to 14 February 2026)

Philippines Internationals From 2011
Opponent	First Match	Played	Won	Drawn	Lost	Win %
China	2011	2	0	0	2	0%
India	2018	2	2	0	0	100%
Laos	2011	2	2	0	0	100%
Malaysia	2026	1	0	0	1	0%
Singapore	2018	2	0	0	2	0%
Thailand	2011	2	0	0	2	0%
Summary	2011	11	4	0	7	36.36%
