= Singapore women's national rugby union team =

Singapore
- Union: Singapore Rugby Union
First colours	Second colours

World Rugby ranking
- Current: 49 (as of 2 March 2026)
- Highest: 38 (2024)
- Lowest: 49 (2026)

First international
- Singapore 0–12 Hong Kong (Kunming, China 17 November 2006)

Biggest win
- Singapore 78–0 Philippines (Petaling Jaya, Singapore 11 February 2026)

Biggest defeat
- Kazakhstan 91–7 Singapore (Almaty, Kazakhstan 4 September 2013)

The Singapore women's national rugby union team are a national sporting side that represents Singapore in women's rugby union. They played their first test match in 2006.

== History ==
The history of women's rugby in Singapore has been a short one. The game was introduced by the Singapore Rugby Union through the men's clubs in 1996.

With the help of the Singapore Rugby Union, the game in the 15s format was introduced to the clubs in 2005 and the first Singapore women's 15s league was established in 2006.

The first Singapore national women's 15s team was formed that year and took part in A.R.F.U.'s Women's Championship 15s in Kunming. Although losing their first four test matches over 2006 and 2007, the team was not to be denied their first win for long. The Singapore Women's National 15s team registered their first victory at the 2008 Asian Women's Championship 15s in Taraz, Kazakhstan when they beat Kyrgyzstan 38–0. The Singapore Women narrowly lost a place in the finals to Japan.

In 2009 Singapore hosted the Asian World Cup qualification tournament.

== Record ==
(Full internationals only)

Rugby: Singapore internationals 2006–
Opponent	First game	Played	Won	Drawn	Lost	Percentage
China	2007	2	0	0	2	0%
Hong Kong	2006	12	1	1	10	8.3%
India	2018	2	1	0	1	100%
Japan	2007	4	0	0	4	0%
Kazakhstan	2013	2	0	0	2	0%
Kyrgyzstan	2008	1	1	0	0	100%
Laos	2012	1	1	0	0	100%
Malaysia	2026	1	0	1	0	0%
Philippines	2018	2	2	0	0	100%
Thailand	2006	2	1	0	1	50%
Uzbekistan	2008	1	0	0	1	0%
Summary		30	7	2	21	23.33%
