= 2017 Women's Rugby World Cup squads =

2017 Rugby World Cup Squads
Tournament details
- Host nation: 2017 Rugby World Cup Squads
- Dates: 9 August – 26 August
- No. of nations: 12

This article lists the official squads for the 2017 Women's Rugby World Cup in Ireland.

== Pool A ==
=== Canada ===
Head Coach: (Canada) Francois Ratier

Note: Flags indicate national union for the club/province as defined by World Rugby.

| Player | Position | Date of birth (age) | Caps | Club/province |
|---|---|---|---|---|
| Elissa Alarie | Wing | 31 January 1986 | | (Quebec) Sainte-Anne-de-Bellevue RC |
| Emily Belchos | Fly-half | 27 April 1995 | | (Ontario) Markham Irish RFC |
| Tyson Beukeboom | Lock | 10 March 1991 | | (Ontario) Aurora Barbarians RFC |
| Latoya Blackwood | Lock | 19 August 1985 | | (Quebec) Sainte-Anne-de-Bellevue RC |
| Andrea Burk | Centre | 7 April 1982 | | (British Columbia) Capilano RFC |
| Olivia DeMerchant | Prop | 16 February 1991 | | (New Brunswick) Woodstock Wildmen RUFC |
| Jacey Grusnick | Flanker | 21 March 1989 | | (Ontario) Aurora Barbarians RFC |
| Chelsea Guthrie | Scrum-half | 30 June 1989 | | (Alberta) Strathcona Druids |
| Magali Harvey | Wing | 16 August 1990 | | CR Quebec |
| Lori Josephson | Scrum-half | 23 October 1992 | | (Ontario) Aurora Barbarians RFC |
| Brittany Kassil | Prop | 14 March 1991 | | (Ontario) Guelph Redcoats |
| Mary Jane Kirby | Hooker | 20 July 1989 | | (Ontario) Highland RFC |
| Kayla Mack | Lock | 9 May 1989 | | (Saskatchewan) Wild Oats RFC |
| Carolyn McEwen | Hooker | 10 July 1986 | | (British Columbia) Burnaby Lake Rugby Club |
| DaLeaka Menin | Prop | 16 June 1995 | | (Alberta) Calgary Hornets |
| Barbara Mervin | Flanker | 1 April 1982 | | (British Columbia) Velox Valhallians |
| Brianna Miller | Flanker | 18 September 1991 | | (Quebec) Sainte-Anne-de-Bellevue RFC |
| Chelsey Minter | Prop | 10 February 1989 | | (British Columbia) Westshore RFC |
| Cindy Nelles | Flanker | 19 August 1993 | | (Ontario) Belleville Bulldogs |
| Karen Paquin | Flanker | 3 August 1987 | | CR Quebec |
| Frédérique Rajotte | Wing | 19 May 1994 | | (Quebec) Sainte-Anne-de-Bellevue RC |
| Kelly Russell | Number 8 | 7 December 1986 | | (Ontario) Toronto Nomads |
| Laura Russell | Hooker | 10 November 1988 | | (Ontario) Toronto Nomads |
| Kristy Sargent | Hooker | 20 October 1987 | | (Alberta) Leprechaun Tigers |
| Alex Tessier | Centre | 3 September 1993 | | (Quebec) Montreal Barbarians |
| Amanda Thornborough | Centre | 2 July 1990 | | (Manitoba) Brandon Barbarians RFC |
| Brittany Waters | Centre | 23 April 1983 | | (British Columbia) Meraloma Rugby |
| Julianne Zussman | Fullback | 23 January 1987 | | (Quebec) Town of Mount Royal RFC |

=== Hong Kong ===
Head coach: (Hong Kong) Jo Hull

Note: Flags indicate national union for the club/province as defined by World Rugby.

| Player | Position | Date of birth (age) | Caps | Club/province |
|---|---|---|---|---|
| Adrienne Garvey (vc) | Centre | 25 April 1985 (aged 32) | | (Hong Kong) Valley RFC |
| Chong Ka-yan | Wing | 24 November 1993 (aged 23) | | (Hong Kong) Gai Wu |
| Laurel Chor | Wing | 8 January 1990 (aged 27) | | (Hong Kong) Valley RFC |
| Kelsie Bouttle | Centre | 12 May 1999 (aged 18) | | (Hong Kong) Valley RFC/ICHK |
| Jessica Ho | Scrum-half | 12 May 1992 (aged 25) | | (Hong Kong) USRC Tigers RFC |
| Rose Hopewell-Fong | Fullback | | | Hong Kong FC |
| Lau Sze-wa | Back | 7 December 1988 (aged 28) | | (Hong Kong) Valley RFC |
| Lee Tsz-ting | Outside-half | 25 April 1996 (aged 21) | 8 | (Hong Kong) Gai Wu/HKBU |
| Chloe Mak | Scrum-half | 21 June 1995 (aged 22) | | (Hong Kong) Kowloon RFC |
| Natasha Olson-Thorne | Centre | 6 October 1992 (aged 24) | | (Hong Kong) USRC Tigers RFC |
| Aggie Poon | Back | 4 November 1994 (aged 22) | | (Hong Kong) Gai Wu |
| Colleen Tjosvold | Back | 30 March 1989 (aged 28) | | (Hong Kong) Valley RFC |
| Lindsay Varty | Half-back | 8 June 1988 (aged 29) | | (Hong Kong) USRC Tigers RFC |
| Chow Mei-nam (c) | Lock | 14 November 1988 (aged 28) | | (Hong Kong) Gai Wu |
| Chan Ka-yan | Loose forward | | | (Hong Kong) Gai Wu |
| Royce Chan Leong-sze | Hooker | 16 September 1978 (aged 38) | | Hong Kong FC |
| Agnes Chan | Flanker | | | (Hong Kong) Tai Po Dragons/HKBU |
| Christy Cheng Ka-chi | Forward | 26 November 1985 (aged 31) | | (Hong Kong) Gai Wu |
| Jasmine Cheung | Prop | | | (Hong Kong) Valley RFC |
| Christine Gordon | Forward | 16 May 1978 (aged 39) | | (Hong Kong) Kowloon RFC |
| Tammy Lau Nga-wun | Forward | 30 July 1992 (aged 25) | | (Hong Kong) Gai Wu |
| Lee Ka-shun | Forward | 24 March 1989 (aged 28) | | (Hong Kong) Gai Wu |
| Pun Wai-yan | Forward | 6 April 1995 (aged 22) | | (Hong Kong) Gai Wu/EdUHK |
| Amélie Seure | Forward | 17 August 1983 (aged 33) | | (Hong Kong) Valley RFC |
| Winnie Siu | Flanker | 18 December 1993 (aged 23) | | (Hong Kong) USRC Tigers RFC |
| Karen So | Hooker | 27 April 1990 (aged 27) | | (Hong Kong) Valley RFC |
| Tsang Sin-yan | Forward | 23 September 1992 (aged 24) | | (Hong Kong) Kowloon RFC |
| Wong Yuen-shan | Prop | | | (Hong Kong) USRC Tigers RFC/EdUHK |

=== New Zealand ===
Head coach: (New Zealand) Glenn Moore

| Player | Position | Date of birth (age) | Caps | Franchise/province |
|---|---|---|---|---|
| Toka Natua | Prop | 22 November 1991 (aged 25) | 16 | Waikato |
| Fiao'o Fa'amausili (c) | Hooker | 30 September 1980 (aged 36) | 52 | Auckland Storm / Auckland |
| Te Kura Ngata-Aerengamate | Hooker | 21 October 1991 (aged 25) | 20 | Counties Manukau |
| Aldora Itunu | Prop | 28 August 1991 (aged 25) | 15 | Auckland Storm / Auckland |
| Aleisha Nelson | Prop | 3 February 1990 (aged 27) | 23 | Auckland Storm / Auckland |
| Sosoli Talawadua | Prop | 30 January 1989 (aged 28) | 8 | Waikato |
| Eloise Blackwell | Lock | 28 December 1990 (aged 26) | 32 | Auckland |
| Becky Wood | Lock | 8 August 1987 (aged 30) | 7 | North Harbour Hibiscus / North Harbour |
| Charmaine Smith | Lock | 15 November 1990 (aged 26) | 14 | North Harbour |
| Charmaine McMenamin | Flanker | 13 May 1990 (aged 27) | 14 | Auckland Storm / Auckland |
| Lesley Ketu | Flanker | 1 October 1987 (aged 29) | 9 | Waikato |
| Rawinia Everitt | Flanker | 9 April 1986 (aged 31) | 22 | Counties Manukau |
| Sarah Goss | Flanker | 9 December 1992 (aged 24) | 10 | Manawatu |
| Linda Itunu | Number 8 | 21 November 1984 (aged 32) | 35 | Auckland Storm / Auckland |
| Aroha Savage | Number 8 | 11 March 1990 (aged 27) | 28 | Counties Manukau |
| Aotearoa Mata'u | Flanker | 5 February 1997 (aged 20) | 8 | Counties Manukau |
| Kendra Cocksedge | Half-back | 1 July 1988 (aged 29) | 42 | Canterbury |
| Kristina Sue | Half-back | 13 March 1987 (aged 30) | 27 | Manawatu Cyclones / Manawatu |
| Victoria Subritzky-Nafatali | First five-eighth | 2 December 1991 (aged 25) | 19 | Counties Manukau |
| Renee Wickcliffe | Wing | 30 May 1987 (aged 30) | 30 | Counties Manukau |
| Carla Hohepa | Centre | 27 July 1985 (aged 32) | 19 | Otago Spirit / Southland |
| Kelly Brazier | Centre | 28 October 1989 (aged 27) | 32 | Bay of Plenty |
| Stacey Waaka | Centre | 3 November 1995 (aged 21) | 11 | Waikato |
| Theresa Fitzpatrick | Centre | 25 February 1995 (aged 22) | 7 | Auckland Storm / Auckland |
| Chelsea Alley | Centre | 11 July 1992 (aged 25) | 15 | Waikato |
| Portia Woodman | Wing | 20 July 1991 (aged 26) | 16 | Counties Manukau |
| Hazel Tubic | Fullback | 31 December 1990 (aged 26) | 11 | Counties Manukau Heat / Counties Manukau |
| Selica Winiata | Fullback | 14 November 1986 (aged 30) | 31 | Manawatu |

=== Wales ===
Head coach: (Wales) Rowland Phillips

Note: Flags indicate national union for the club/province as defined by World Rugby.

| Player | Position | Date of birth (age) | Caps | Club/province |
|---|---|---|---|---|
| Alisha Butchers | ?? | | | (Wales) |
| Mel Clay | ?? | | | (Wales) |
| Amy Evans | ?? | | | (Wales) |
| Lleucu George | ?? | | | (Wales) |
| Cerys Hale | ?? | | | (Wales) |
| Sioned Harries | ?? | | | (Wales) |
| Morfudd Ifans | ?? | | | (Wales) |
| Kelsey Jones | ?? | | | (Wales) |
| Siwan Lillicrap | ?? | | | (Wales) |
| Carys Phillips (c) | ?? | | | (Wales) |
| Shona Powell-Hughes | ?? | | | (Wales) |
| Gwenllian Pyrs | ?? | | | (Wales) |
| Rebecca Rowe | ?? | | | (Wales) |
| Rachel Taylor | ?? | | | (Wales) |
| Caryl Thomas | ?? | | | (Wales) |
| Megan York | ?? | | | (Wales) |
| Keira Bevan | ?? | | | (Wales) |
| Elen Evans | ?? | | | (Wales) |
| Jodie Evans | ?? | | | (Wales) |
| Rebecca De Filippo | ?? | | | (Wales) |
| Dyddgu Hywel | ?? | | | (Wales) |
| Hannah Jones | ?? | | | (Wales) |
| Jasmine Joyce | ?? | | | (Wales) |
| Sian Moore | ?? | | | (Wales) |
| Jess Kavanagh-Williams | ?? | | | (Wales) |
| Gemma Rowland | ?? | | | (Wales) |
| Elinor Snowsill | ?? | | | (Wales) |
| Robyn Wilkins | ?? | | | (Wales) |

== Pool B ==
=== England ===
Head coach: (England) Simon Middleton

Note: Flags indicate national union for the club/province as defined by World Rugby.

| Player | Position | Date of birth (age) | Caps | Club/province |
|---|---|---|---|---|
| Zoe Aldcroft | Second row | | | (England) Darlington |
| Sarah Bern | Prop | | | (England) Bristol |
| Rochelle Clark | Prop | | | (England) Worcester |
| Poppy Cleall | Back row | | | (England) Bristol |
| Amy Cokayne | Hooker | | | (England) Lichfield |
| Vickii Cornborough | Prop | | | (England) Harlequins |
| Vicky Fleetwood | Back row | | | (England) Saracens |
| Sarah Hunter (C) | Back row | | | (England) Bristol |
| Heather Kerr | ?? | | | (England) Darlington |
| Justine Lucas | ?? | | | (England) Lichfield |
| Alex Matthews | Back row | | | (England) Richmond |
| Harriet Millar-Mills | Second row | | | (England) Lichfield |
| Izzy Noel-Smith | ?? | | | (England) Bristol |
| Marlie Packer | Back row | | | (England) Bristol |
| Abbie Scott | Second row | | | (England) Darlington |
| Tamara Taylor | Second row | | | (England) Darlington |
| Rachael Burford | Centre | | | (England) Harlequins |
| Natasha Hunt | Scrum-half | | | (England) Lichfield |
| Megan Jones | Fly-half | | | (England) Bristol |
| La Toya Mason | Scrum-half | | | (England) Darlington |
| Katy Mclean | Fly-half | | | (England) Darlington |
| Amber Reed | Centre | | | (England) Bristol |
| Leanne Riley | Scrum-half | | | (England) Harlequins |
| Emily Scarratt (VC) | Centre | | | (England) Lichfield |
| Emily Scott | Fullback | | | (England) Saracens |
| Lydia Thompson | Wing | | | (England) Worcester |
| Danielle Waterman | Fullback | | | (England) Bristol |
| Kay Wilson | Wing | | | (England) Richmond |
| Amy Wilson-Hardy | Wing | | | (England) Bristol |

=== Italy ===
Head coach: (Italy) Andrea Di Giandomenico

Note: Flags indicate national union for the club/province as defined by World Rugby.

| Player | Position | Date of birth (age) | Caps | Club/province |
|---|---|---|---|---|
| Elisa Bonaldo | ?? | | | (Italy) |
| Elisa Cucchiella | ?? | | | (Italy) |
| Marta Ferrari | ?? | | | (Italy) |
| Lucia Gai | Prop | | | (Italy) |
| Gaia Giacomoli | ?? | | | (Italy) |
| Melissa Bettoni | Hooker | | | (Italy) |
| Lucia Cammarano | ?? | | | (Italy) |
| Valeria Fedrighi | Second row | | | (Italy) |
| Valentina Ruzza | ?? | | | (Italy) |
| Flavia Severin | ?? | | | (Italy) |
| Sara Tounesi | Lock | | | (Italy) |
| Alice Trevisan | ?? | | | (Italy) |
| Ilaria Arrighetti | Back row | | | (Italy) |
| Michela Este | ?? | | | (Italy) |
| Silvia Gaudino | ?? | | | (Italy) |
| Elisa Giordano | Back row | | | (Italy) |
| Isabella Locatelli | Lock | | | (Italy) |
| Sara Barattin (c) | ?? | | | (Italy) |
| Beatrice Rigoni | ?? | | | (Italy) |
| Veronica Schiavon | ?? | | | (Italy) |
| Maria Grazia Cioffi | ?? | | | (Italy) |
| Manuela Furlan | ?? | | | (Italy) |
| Veronica Madia | Fly-half | | | (Italy) |
| Maria Magatti | ?? | | | (Italy) |
| Aura Muzzo | ?? | | | (Italy) |
| Michela Sillari | Centre | | | (Italy) |
| Sofia Stefan | ?? | | | (Italy) |
| Paola Zangirolami | ?? | | | (Italy) |

=== Spain ===
Head coach: (Spain) José Antonio Barrio

Note: Flags indicate national union for the club/province as defined by World Rugby.

| Player | Position | Date of birth (age) | Caps | Club/province |
|---|---|---|---|---|
| Aroa González (c) | Hooker | | | (Spain) |
| Isabel Rico (vc) | Prop | | | (Spain) |
| Jeanina Vinueza | Forward | | | (Spain) |
| Isabel Macías | Forward | | | (Spain) |
| Laura Delgado | Forward | | | (Spain) |
| Saioa Jaurena | Forward | | | (Spain) |
| Rocío García | Forward | | | (Spain) |
| Mónica Castelo | Forward | | | (Spain) |
| Berta García | Forward | | | (Spain) |
| Elena Redondo | Forward | | | (Spain) |
| María Ribera | Forward | | | (Spain) |
| Lourdes Alameda | Forward | | | (Spain) |
| Diana Gassó | Forward | | | (Spain) |
| Paula Medín | Forward | | | (Spain) |
| Ángela del Pan | Forward | | | (Spain) |
| Carmen Pérez | Forward | | | (Spain) |
| Patricia García | Back | | | (Spain) |
| Anne Fernández de Corres | Back | | | (Spain) |
| Carlota Méliz | Back | | | (Spain) |
| María Ahís | Back | | | (Spain) |
| Amaia Erbina | Back | | | (Spain) |
| Bárbara García | Back | | | (Spain) |
| Bárbara Pla | Back | | | (Spain) |
| María Casado | Back | | | (Spain) |
| Uri Barrutieta | Back | | | (Spain) |
| Iera Echebarría | Back | | | (Spain) |
| Vanesa Rial | Back | | | (Spain) |
| Marina Bravo | Back | | | (Spain) |

=== United States ===
Head coach: (United States) Pete Steinberg

Note: Flags indicate national union for the club/province as defined by World Rugby.

| Player | Position | Date of birth (age) | Caps | Club/province |
|---|---|---|---|---|
| Katy Augustyn | Hooker | | | (United States) Berkeley All Blues |
| Catie Benson | Prop | | | (United States) Life West Gladiatrix |
| Sylvia Braaten | Centre | | | (United States) Twin City Amazons |
| Stacey Bridges | Lock | | | (United States) Twin City Amazons |
| Kayla Canett | Scrum-half | | | (United States) Penn State |
| Cheta Emba | Fullback | | | (United States) USA Sevens |
| Tiffany Fa’ae’e | Prop | | | (United States) New York Rugby Club |
| Tess Feury | Fly-half | | | (United States) Penn State |
| Jordan Gray | Number 8 | | | (United States) Life West Gladiatrix |
| Abby Gustaitis | Flanker | | | (United States) NOVA |
| Nicole Heavirland | Centre | | | (United States) USA Sevens |
| Nick James | Prop | | | (United States) HARC |
| Jessica Javelet | Wing | | | (United States) USA Sevens |
| Alev Kelter | Centre | | | (United States) USA Sevens |
| Deven Owsiany | Scrum-half | | | (United States) San Diego Surfers |
| Sam Pankey | Hooker | | | (United States) San Diego Surfers |
| Sara Parsons | Flanker | | | (United States) NOVA |
| Christiane Pheil | Flanker | | | (United States) Chicago North Shore |
| Naima Reddick | Prop | | | (United States) Seattle Rugby Club |
| Jamila Reinhardt | Prop | | | (United States) San Diego Surfers |
| Hope Rogers | Prop | | | (United States) San Diego Surfers |
| Kimber Rozier | Fly-half | | | (England) Harlequins |
| Kristine Sommer | Lock | | | (United States) Seattle Rugby Club |
| Naya Tapper | Wing | | | (United States) USA Sevens |
| Kris Thomas | Wing | | | (United States) USA Sevens |
| Alycia Washington | Lock | | | (United States) New York Rugby Club |
| Jess Wooden | Fullback | | | (England) Harlequins |
| Kate Zackary | Flanker | | | (United States) San Diego Surfers |

== Pool C ==
=== Australia ===
Head coach: (Australia) Paul Verrell

Note: Flags indicate national union for the club/province as defined by World Rugby.

| Player | Position | Date of birth (age) | Caps | Club/province |
|---|---|---|---|---|
| Millie Boyle | ?? | | | (Australia) |
| Louise Burrows | Prop | | | (Australia) |
| Chloe Butler | ?? | | | (Australia) |
| Cheyenne Campbell | ?? | | | (Australia) |
| Rebecca Clough | ?? | | | (Australia) |
| Mollie Gray | ?? | | | (Australia) |
| Grace Hamilton | ?? | | | (Australia) |
| Alisha Hewett | ?? | | | (Australia) |
| Evelyn Horomia | ?? | | | (Australia) |
| Kiri Lingman | ?? | | | (Australia) |
| Hana Ngaha | ?? | | | (Australia) |
| Shannon Parry | ?? | | | (Australia) |
| Liz Patu | ?? | | | (Australia) |
| Emily Robinson | ?? | | | (Australia) |
| Hilisha Samoa | ?? | | | (Australia) |
| Alexandra Sulusi | ?? | | | (Australia) |
| Violeta Tupuola | ?? | | | (Australia) |
| Katrina Barker | ?? | | | (Australia) |
| Fenella Hake | ?? | | | (Australia) |
| Ashleigh Hewson | ?? | | | (Australia) |
| Nareta Marsters | ?? | | | (Australia) |
| Mahalia Murphy | ?? | | | (Australia) |
| Trilleen Pomare | ?? | | | (Australia) |
| Sarah Riordan | ?? | | | (Australia) |
| Kayla Sauvao | ?? | | | (Australia) |
| Huia Swanell | ?? | | | (Australia) |
| Ashleigh Timoko | ?? | | | (Australia) |
| Samantha Treherne | ?? | | | (Australia) |
| Sharni Williams | ?? | | | (Australia) |

=== France ===
Head coach: (France) Samuel Cherouk

Note: Flags indicate national union for the club/province as defined by World Rugby.

| Player | Position | Date of birth (age) | Caps | Club/province |
|---|---|---|---|---|
| Manon Andre | ?? | | | (France) |
| Julie Annery | ?? | | | (France) |
| Lise Arricastre | ?? | | | (France) |
| Patricia Carricaburu | ?? | | | (France) |
| Lénaig Corson | ?? | | | (France) |
| Annaëlle Deshayes | ?? | | | (France) |
| Julie Duval | ?? | | | (France) |
| Céline Ferer | ?? | | | (France) |
| Audrey Forlani | ?? | | | (France) |
| Romane Menager | ?? | | | (France) |
| Gaëlle Mignot (C) | ?? | | | (France) |
| Safi N'Diaye | ?? | | | (France) |
| Caroline Thomas | ?? | | | (France) |
| Dhia Traore | ?? | | | (France) |
| Audrey Abadie | ?? | | | (France) |
| Montserrat Amédée | ?? | | | (France) |
| Caroline Boujard | ?? | | | (France) |
| Caroline Drouin | ?? | | | (France) |
| Elodie Guiglion | ?? | | | (France) |
| Shannon Izar | ?? | | | (France) |
| Caroline Ladagnous | ?? | | | (France) |
| Jade Le Pesq | ?? | | | (France) |
| Marjorie Mayans | ?? | | | (France) |
| Carla Neisen | ?? | | | (France) |
| Chloé Pelle | ?? | | | (France) |
| Elodie Poublan | ?? | | | (France) |
| Yanna Rivoalen | ?? | | | (France) |
| Jessy Tremouliere | ?? | | | (France) |

=== Ireland ===
Head coach: (Ireland) Tom Tierney

Note: Flags indicate national union for the club/province as defined by World Rugby.

| Player | Position | Date of birth (age) | Caps | Club/province |
|---|---|---|---|---|
| Ashleigh Baxter | Forward | | | (Republic of Ireland) |
| Anna Caplice | Flanker | | | (Republic of Ireland) |
| Ciara Cooney | Lock | | | (Republic of Ireland) |
| Ailis Egan | Prop | | | (Republic of Ireland) |
| Paula Fitzpatrick | Loose forward | | | (Republic of Ireland) |
| Ciara Griffin | Flanker | | | (Republic of Ireland) |
| Leah Lyons | Prop | | | (Republic of Ireland) |
| Claire Molloy | Loose forward | | | (Republic of Ireland) |
| Cliodhna Moloney | Hooker | | | (Republic of Ireland) |
| Heather O'Brien | Loose forward | | | (Republic of Ireland) |
| Ciara O'Connor | Forward | | | (Republic of Ireland) |
| Ruth O'Reilly | Prop | | | (Republic of Ireland) |
| Lindsay Peat | Prop | | | (Republic of Ireland) |
| Marie Louise Reilly | Lock | | | (Republic of Ireland) |
| Sophie Spence | Back row | | | (Republic of Ireland) |
| Niamh Briggs (C) | Back | | | (Republic of Ireland) |
| Eimear Considine | Fullback | | | (Republic of Ireland) |
| Mairead Coyne | Back | | | (Republic of Ireland) |
| Nicole Cronin | Back | | | (Republic of Ireland) |
| Jeamie Deacon | Wing | | | (Republic of Ireland) |
| Katie Fitzhenry | Centre | | | (Republic of Ireland) |
| Claire McLaughlin | Centre | | | (Republic of Ireland) |
| Alison Miller | Wing | | | (Republic of Ireland) |
| Larissa Muldoon | Scrum-half | | | (Republic of Ireland) |
| Jenny Murphy | Centre | | | (Republic of Ireland) |
| Sene Naoupu | Fly-half | | | (Republic of Ireland) |
| Nora Stapleton | Fly-half | | | (Republic of Ireland) |
| Hannah Tyrrell | Fullback | | | (Republic of Ireland) |
| Ilse van Staden | Prop | | | (Republic of Ireland) |

=== Japan ===
Head coach: (Japan) Goshi Arimizu

Note: Flags indicate national union for the club/province as defined by World Rugby.

| Player | Position | Date of birth (age) | Caps | Club/province |
|---|---|---|---|---|
| Makoto Ebuchi | Forward | | | (Japan) Tokyo Sankyu Phoenix |
| Mizuho Kataoka | Forward | | | (Japan) Yokohama TKM |
| Seina Saito (c) | Forward | | | (Japan) Mie Pearls |
| Ayano Sakurai | Forward | | | (Japan) Nippon Sport Science University |
| Yui Shiozaki | Forward | | | (Japan) Tokyo Sankyu Phoenix |
| Yuki Sue | Forward | | | (Japan) Arukas Queen Kumagaya |
| Ayaka Suzuki | Forward | | | (Japan) Arukas Queen Kumagaya |
| Sayaka Suzuki | Forward | | | (Japan) RKU Rugby Ryugasaki Grace |
| Misaki Suzuki | Forward | | | (Japan) Tokyo Sankyu Phoenix |
| Maki Takano | Forward | | | (Japan) Nippon Sport Science University |
| Aya Nakajima | Forward | | | (Japan) Arukas Queen Kumagaya |
| Ai Hyugaji | Forward | | | (Japan) Tokyo Sankyu Phoenix |
| Maiko Fujimoto | Forward | | | (Japan) Yokohama TKM |
| Mateitoga Bogidraumainadave | Forward | | | (Japan) Arukas Queen Kumagaya |
| Saki Minami | Forward | | | (Japan) Nippon Sport Science University |
| Aoi Mimura | Forward | | | (Japan) Yokohama TKM |
| Keiko Kato | Back | | | (Japan) Setagaya Ladies |
| Riho Kurogi | Back | | | (Japan) Arukas Queen Kumagaya |
| Mayu Shimizu | Back | | | (Japan) Nippon Sport Science University |
| Ai Tasaka | Back | | | (Japan) Arukas Queen Kumagaya |
| Moe Tsukui | Back | | | (Japan) Tokyo University of Agriculture |
| Honoka Tsutsumi | Back | | | (Japan) Nippon Sport Science University |
| Makiko Tomita | Back | | | (Japan) Setagaya Ladies |
| Iroha Nagata | Back | | | (Japan) Arukas Queen Kumagaya |
| Yumeno Noda | Back | | | (Japan) Arukas Queen Kumagaya |
| Eriko Hirano | Back | | | (Japan) Yokohama TKM |
| Wasana Fukushima | Back | | | (Japan) Otemon Gakuin University |
| Minori Yamamoto | Back | | | (Japan) Nippon Sport Science University |
