= 2017 Asia Rugby Women's Championship =

2017 Asia Rugby Championship
- Countries: Japan; Hong Kong
- Number of teams: 2
- Champions: Japan
- Runners-up: Hong Kong
- Matches played: 2
- Top point scorer: Riho Kurogi (30 pts)
- Top try scorer: Riho Kurogi (4)

The 2017 Asia Rugby Women's Championship was from 8th – 15th July. The first round was hosted by Japan and Hong Kong the second round. Japan claimed the championship after defeating Hong Kong.

== Table ==
Team	Pld	W	D	L	TF	TD	PF	PA	PD	BP	Pts
Japan	2	2	0	0	20	17	118	19	99	0	8
Hong Kong	2	0	0	2	3	-17	19	118	-99	0	0

== Results ==
=== Round 1 ===
2017-07-08

Japan	58–0	Hong Kong

Shiroyama

FB	15	MAYU SHIMIZU
RW	14	RIHO KUROGI
OC	13	IROHA NAGATA
IC	12	KEIKO KATO
LW	11	ERIKO HIRANO
FH	10	WASANA FUKUSHIMA
SH	9	YUMENO NODA
N8	8	AYAKA SUZUKI
OF	7	YUKI SUE
BF	6	YUI SHIOZAKI
RL	5	AYANO TANAKA
LL	4	AYA NAKAJIMA
TP	3	SAKI MINAMI
HK	2	SEINA SAITO
LP	1	MAKOTO EBUCHI
Replacements:
	16	CHIHIRO KOBAYASHI
	17	MAIKO FUJIMOTO
	18	SACHIKO KATO
	19	SORA KONISHI
	20	YUKI OYOKAWA
	21	MOE TSUKUI
	22	CHIKAMI INOUE
	23	AI TASAKA
Coach:
GOSHI ARIMIZU

FB	15	PAK YAN POON
RW	14	LAUREL CHOR
OC	13	ADRIENNE GARVEY
IC	12	REBECCA THOMPSON
LW	11	SZE WA LAU
FH	10	TSZ TING LEE
SH	9	LINDSAY VARTY
N8	8	AMELIE SEURE
OF	7	TSZ CHING CHAN
BF	6	CHRISTINE GORDON
RL	5	SIN YAN TSANG
LL	4	KA YAN CHAN
TP	3	YUEN SHAN WONG
HK	2	ROYCE CHAN LEONG SZE
LP	1	NGA WUN LAU
Replacements:
	16	WINNIE SIU WING NI
	17	KA SHUN LEE
	18	SHUK HAN CHEUNG
	19	WAI YAN PUN
	20	HOI LAM HO
	21	JESSICA HO
	22	ROSE HOPEWELL-FONG
	23	KELSIE BOUTTLE
Coach:
JO HULL

=== Round 2 ===
2017-07-15

Hong Kong	19–60	Japan

Hong Kong

FB	15	COLLEEN TJOSVOLD
RW	14	PAK YAN POON
OC	13	NATASHA OLSON-THORNE
IC	12	KELSIE BOUTTLE
LW	11	KA YAN CHONG
FH	10	ROSE HOPEWELL-FONG
SH	9	HO YEE MAK
N8	8	CHRISTINE GORDON
OF	7	TSZ CHING CHAN
BF	6	CHRISTY CHENG KA CHI
RL	5	AMELIE SEURE
LL	4	MEI NAM CHOW
TP	3	KA SHUN LEE
HK	2	KAREN SO HOI TING
LP	1	YUEN SHAN WONG
Replacements:
	16	ROYCE CHAN LEONG SZE
	17	SHUK HAN CHEUNG
	18	NGA WUN LAU
	19	WAI YAN PUN
	20	WAI SUM SHAM
	21	TSZ TING LEE
	22	IVY KWONG SAU YAN
	23	SZE WA LAU
Coach:
JO HULL

FB	15	AI TASAKA
RW	14	AKARI KATO
OC	13	RIHO KUROGI
IC	12	MIZUHO ITO
LW	11	HONOKA TSUTSUMI
FH	10	WASANA FUKUSHIMA
SH	9	MOE TSUKUI
N8	8	MAKI TAKANO
OF	7	YUKI SUE
BF	6	YUKI OYOKAWA
RL	5	AOI MIMURA
LL	4	AI HYUGAJI
TP	3	MAIKO FUJIMOTO
HK	2	MISAKI SUZUKI
LP	1	SEINA SAITO
Replacements:
HK	16	MIZUHO KATAOKA
PR	17	SORA KONISHI
PR	18	SACHIKO KATO
LK	19	AYANO SAKURAI
FL	20	AYAKA SUZUKI
FB	21	YUMENO NODA
WG	22	CHIKAMI INOUE
OB	23	ERIKO HIRANO
Coach:
GOSHI ARIMIZU
