= 2016 Asia Rugby Women's Championship =

Women's Rugby championship held in 2016

2016 Asia Rugby Championship
- Countries: Japan; Hong Kong
- Number of teams: 2
- Champions: Japan
- Runners-up: Hong Kong
- Matches played: 2
- Top point scorer: Ai Tasaka (14 pts)
- Top try scorer: Ai Tasaka (2); Ai Hyugaji (2); Miki Terauchi (2)

The 2016 Asia Rugby Women's Championship was from 7 – 28 May and held in Hong Kong and Japan. Kazakhstan withdrew from the competition leaving only Japan and Hong Kong. Japan were crowned champions.

== Table ==
Team	Pld	W	D	L	TF	TD	PF	PA	PD	BP	Pts
Japan	2	2	0	0	13	13	69	6	63	0	8
Hong Kong	2	0	0	2	0	-13	6	69	-63	0	0

== Results ==
=== Round 1 ===
Test: 1151	7 May 2016	Hong Kong	3-39	Japan	Hong Kong Football Club Stadium
		Pen: Aggie POON Pak Yan 30'		Try: Honoka TSUTSUMI 1'; Ai TASAKA 12'; Eriko HIRANO 22'; Misaki SUZUKI 26'; Miki TERAUCHI 71'; Ai TASAKA 77'; Ai HYUGAJI 80'; Con: Ai TASAKA 13', 37'

FB	15	Adrienne Garvey
RW	14	Aggie Poon Pak Yan
OC	13	Natasha Olson-Thorne
IC	12	Tsz Ting Lee
LW	11	Ka Yan Chong
FH	10	Rose Fong
SH	9	Colleen Jenny Tjosvold
N8	8	Amelie Seure
OF	7	Melody Blessing Nim Yan Li
BF	6	Christine Gordon
RL	5	Mei Nam Chow
LL	4	Claire Forster
TP	3	Shuk-Han Cheung
HK	2	Winnie Wing Ni Siu
LP	1	Nga-Wun Lau
Replacements:
	16	Karen Hoi Ting So
	17	Hoi Ying Ku
	18	Ka Yan Chan
	19	Ching To Cheng
	20	Sharon Shin Yuen Tsang
	21	Ho Yee Mak
	22	Tsz Ting Cheng
	23	Ka Man Nam
Coach:
Jo Hull

FB	15	Ai Tasaka
RW	14	Honoka Tsutsumi
OC	13	Shione Nakayama
IC	12	Miki Terauchi
LW	11	Eriko Hirano
FH	10	Minori Yamamoto
SH	9	Yumeno Noda
N8	8	Misaki Suzuki
OF	7	Yuki Sue
BF	6	Ayumi Inui
RL	5	Aoi Mimura
LL	4	Ai Hyugaji
TP	3	Saki Minami
HK	2	Chihiro Kobayashi
LP	1	Seina Saito
Replacements:
HK	16	Sayaka Yamamoto
PR	17	Mizuho Kataoka
PR	18	Maki Ito
LK	19	Ayano Sakurai
FL	20	Yuki Ito
FB	21	Chikami Inoue
WG	22	Mana Furuta
OB	23	Mayu Shimizu
Coach:
Goshi Arimizu

=== Round 2 ===
Test: 1153	28 May 2016	Japan	30-3	Hong Kong	Chichibunomiya Rugby Stadium
		Try: Saki Minami 7'; Mizuki HOMMA 34'; Miki TERAUCHI 56'; Yuki SUE 65'; Riho KUROGI 69'; Ai HYUGAJI 75'		Pen: Aggie POON Pak Yan 16'

FB	15	Ai Tasaka (c)
RW	14	Mizuki Homma
OC	13	Shione Nakayama
IC	12	Miki Terauchi
LW	11	Eriko Hirano
FH	10	Minori Yamamoto
SH	9	Yumeno Noda
N8	8	Yuki Ito
OF	7	Yuki Sue
BF	6	Ayumi Inui
RL	5	Aoi Mimura
LL	4	Ai Hyugaji
TP	3	Saki Minami
HK	2	Misaki Suzuki
LP	1	Seina Saito
Replacements:
	16	Mizuho Kataoka
	17	Sayaka Yamamoto
	18	Maki Ito
	19	Ayano Sakurai
	20	Yuki Oyokawa
	21	Chikami Inoue
	22	Mana Furuta
	23	Riho Kurogi
Coach:
Goshi Arimizu

FB	15	Adrienne Donna Garvey
RW	14	Aggie Poon Pak Yan
OC	13	Natasha Shangwe Olson-Thorne
IC	12	Rose Fong
LW	11	Ka Yan Chong
FH	10	Pou Fan Lai
SH	9	Colleen Jenny Tjosvold
N8	8	Amelie Seure
OF	7	Melody Blessing Nim Yan Li
BF	6	Christine Gordon
RL	5	Mei Nam Chow (c)
LL	4	Ching To Cheng
TP	3	Shuk-Han Cheung
HK	2	Winnie Wing Ni Siu
LP	1	Nga-Wun Lau
Replacements:
HK	16	Ka Shun Lee
PR	17	Hoi Ying Ku
PR	18	Ka Yan Chan
LK	19	Claire Forster
FL	20	Sharon Shin Yuen Tsang
FB	21	Lindsay Varty
WG	22	Tsz Ting Cheng
OB	23	Ka Man Nam
Coach:
Jo Hull
