= Yumeno Noda =

Japan international rugby union player

- Born: 25 October 1997 (age 29)
- Height: 163 cm (5 ft 4 in)
- Weight: 60 kg (132 lb; 9 st 6 lb)

Rugby union career
- Position: Scrum-half
Senior career
Years	Team	Apps	(Points)
?–2021	Arukas Queen Kumagaya		
2021–2022	Tokyo Sankyu Phoenix		
International career
Years	Team	Apps	(Points)
2015–	Japan		
National sevens team
Years	Team		Comps
2015–	Japan 7s		
Coaching career
- Years: Team
- 2025–: Tokyo Sankyu Phoenix (Sevens)

Yumeno Noda (born 25 October 1997) is a Japanese rugby union coach and former player. She competed for Japan at the 2017 Women's Rugby World Cup.

== Early career ==
Noda started playing rugby in the fourth grade of elementary school. She graduated from Fukuoka High School in 2015, and entered Rissho University.

After graduating from Rissho University in 2020, she joined Hino Motors.

== Rugby career ==
=== Playing ===
Noda was selected for the Japanese women's national sevens team in April 2015. A few months later, she made her international debut for the Sakura fifteens side in the Asian Women's Championship.

In 2017, she helped the Sakura fifteens reclaim their Asian Championship title with an emphatic win against Hong Kong. She scored one of many tries in their 60–19 victory. She was selected for the Japanese squad to the Women's Rugby World Cup in Ireland.

She left Arukas Queen Kumagaya on 31 March 2021. She joined Tokyo Sankyu Phoenix on 5 April the same year. She announced her retirement from rugby at the end of the 2022 season.

=== Coaching ===
On 20 June 2025, she was appointed as Head coach of the Tokyo Sankyu Phoenix Sevens team.
