= Wong Yuen-shan =

Hong Kong rugby union player

Wong Yuen-shan is a Hong Kong rugby union player. She represented Hong Kong at the 2017 Women's Rugby World Cup, it was Hong Kong's first World Cup appearance.

== Biography ==
Wong featured in Hong Kong's Rugby World Cup repechage match against Japan in 2016. She started in the two games against Japan at the 2017 Asia Rugby Women's Championship. She started in Hong Kong's first World Cup match against Canada, her side was routed 98–0. She also started in the ninth place semi-final match against Spain.

Wong was named in the squad that played in a two-test series against Kazakhstan in December 2022.
