= Angela Chan Ka-yan =

Hong Kong rugby union player

Angela Chan Ka-yan is a Hong Kong rugby union player. She competed at the 2017 Women's Rugby World Cup.

== Personal life ==
Chan has a Master of Social Science degree in Psychology from the University of Hong Kong.

== Rugby career ==
Chan debuted for Hong Kong against Japan in the first match of the 2016 Asia Rugby Women's Championship. She then featured for Hong Kong in a test match against Singapore the following week which was not part of the championship. She also played in the second match of the Asia Women's Championship.

She was named in the training squad for the 2017 Women's Rugby World Cup qualifiers against Fiji and Japan in November 2016. She was selected for Hong Kong's squad in their first Rugby World Cup appearance in 2017.

In 2018, she made Hong Kong's squad for their tour of Spain and Wales. She started in the first of two matches against Spain.
