= Christine Gordon =

HK international rugby union player

- Born: 16 May 1978 (age 48)
- Height: 1.66 m (5 ft 5 in)
- Weight: 73 kg (161 lb)

Rugby union career
- Position: Forward
International career
Years	Team	Apps	(Points)
- Hong Kong
National sevens team
Years	Team		Comps
- Hong Kong

Christine Gordon (born 16 May 1978) is a Canadian born former Hong Kong rugby union player. She represented Hong Kong at the 2017 Women's Rugby World Cup in Ireland, it was their first-ever World Cup appearance.

== Rugby career ==
=== Sevens ===
Gordon has represented Hong Kong in sevens and fifteens. She competed at the 2014 Hong Kong Women's Sevens. She was named in Hong Kong's sevens team in 2015, for a qualifier tournament in Ireland as they sought for one of two core team spots that was up for grabs. The winners would be one of the core teams in the 2015–16 Sevens Series.

She featured at the 2016 Hong Kong Women's Sevens, scoring a try in their match against Thailand. In 2017, she was named in the training squad ahead of their Sevens Series Qualifier.

=== XVs ===
Gordon was selected in Hong Kong's squad for the 2014 Asia Women's Four Nations in May. In 2016, she scored in her sides win against Fiji in a Rugby World Cup qualification match in December.

In 2017, she started in both of Hong Kong's matches against Japan at the Asian Championships. She represented Hong Kong when they debuted at the 2017 Women's Rugby World Cup in Ireland. She started in their game against New Zealand at Number 8.
