= Ai Watanabe =

Japan international rugby union player

- Born: 5 October 1994 (age 32)
- Height: 168 cm (5 ft 6 in)
- Weight: 61 kg (134 lb; 9 st 8 lb)

Rugby union career
- Position: Flanker
Senior career
Years	Team	Apps	(Points)
?–2017	Tokyo Sankyu Phoenix		
International career
Years	Team	Apps	(Points)
?–2017	Japan		

Ai Watanabe (née Hyugaji; born 5 October 1994) is a former Japanese rugby union player. She competed for Japan at the 2017 Women's Rugby World Cup.

== Early years ==
Watanabe began playing rugby in her senior year of high school, she had previously captained her volleyball club. In 2013, after graduating from Engaru High School, she joined Totsuka Kyoritsu Medical (now Yokohama TKM).

== Rugby career ==
Watanabe was part of the Japanese side that won the 2016 Asia Rugby Women's Championship. She scored tries in both matches against Hong Kong.

In 2017, she was selected for the Japan women's national team for the Women's Rugby World Cup in Ireland. Following the tournament, she announced her retirement from rugby due to a shoulder injury.

== Personal life ==
In 2018, she married Takayuki Watanabe who played for Kobelco Kobe Steelers and the Japanese national rugby union team.
