= Maiko Fujimoto =

Japan international rugby union player

- Born: 4 December 1991 (age 34)
- Height: 161 cm (5 ft 3 in)
- Weight: 70 kg (154 lb; 11 st 0 lb)

Rugby union career
- Position: Hooker
Senior career
Years	Team	Apps	(Points)
- Yokohama TKM
- Arukas Queen Kumagaya
Provincial / State sides
Years	Team	Apps	(Points)
2018	Auckland	5	(0)
International career
Years	Team	Apps	(Points)
- Japan

Maiko Fujimoto (born 4 December 1991) is a former Japanese rugby union player. She competed for Japan at the 2017 Women's Rugby World Cup.

== Rugby career ==
After graduating from Kiso Seiho High School and Chukyo University, she joined Yokohama TKM.

In 2017, she was selected in Japan's squad to the Women's Rugby World Cup in Ireland.

She had a stint playing for Auckland in the Farah Palmer Cup in 2018. She also played club rugby for Ponsonby.

In 2019, during the Sakura's tour of Australia, she scored her sides only try in the first of a two-test series in Newcastle.
