= Jasmine Cheung =

Hong Kong rugby union player

Rugby union career
- Position: Prop
Senior career
Years	Team	Apps	(Points)
	Valley RFC		(0)
International career
Years	Team	Apps	(Points)
2015–2020	Hong Kong	?	(0)

Jasmine Cheung Shuk-han is a former Hong Kong rugby union player. She competed for Hong Kong when they made their first Rugby World Cup appearance at the 2017 tournament .

== Rugby career ==
Cheung was named in Hong Kong's squad that toured Spain in a two-test match series in Madrid in 2015. She made her international debut against Spain in December 2015.

In 2016, she featured for her club, HKRU Scorpions, against a touring Princeton A team at King's Park in Hong Kong; Her team scored ten tries to win 58–17. She was named in Hong Kong's training squad in preparation for their Rugby World Cup qualifiers matches against Fiji and Japan in 2016. She also featured in two training games against Kazakhstan as part of their preparation.

Cheung was selected in Hong Kong's historic squad who made their first Rugby World Cup appearance in 2017.

Cheung was called again into the national team for the 2019 Asia Pacific Championship against Fiji and Samoa. She made her last appearance for Hong Kong in 2020.

== Personal life ==
Cheung is a full-stack software engineer; she completed an intensive 12 weeks of Makers Academy. She attended the University of Exeter.
