= Kelsie Bouttle =

Hong Kong rugby union player (born 1999)

- Born: 12 May 1999 (age 27)
- School: International College Hong Kong
- University: University of Queensland

Rugby union career
- Position: centre
Youth career
- Flying Kukris
Senior career
Years	Team	Apps	(Points)
.	Valley		
International career
Years	Team	Apps	(Points)
2017-	Hong Kong		

Kelsie Bouttle (born 12 May 1999) is a Hong Kong women's rugby union player. She plays as a centre for Valley RFC and the Hong Kong women's national rugby union team.

== Career ==
Bouttle is the daughter of Shelley Bouttle, part of the Hong Kong women's team's first rugby tour and the Royal Hong Kong Police team that reached the final of the Dubai Women's Sevens in 1994. Bouttle started playing junior rugby for the Flying Kukris and while she was studying at the International College Hong Kong, she was chosen to represent Hong Kong girl's under-18s rugby sevens team, in the first ever Asia Rugby under-18s Girl's Sevens Championship. She first started playing rugby at senior level at Valley RFC.

In 2017, Bouttle made her debut for the Hong Kong women's national rugby union team in the 2017 Asia Women's Rugby Championship against the Japan women's national rugby union team. She was selected later that year to play for Hong Kong at the 2017 Women's Rugby World Cup in Ireland. During the tournament, she made her first start against the New Zealand women's national rugby union team.
