= Yuki Sue =

Japan international rugby union player

- Born: 3 November 1993 (age 33)
- Height: 162 cm (5 ft 4 in)
- Weight: 60 kg (132 lb; 9 st 6 lb)

Rugby union career
- Position: Flanker
Senior career
| Years | Team | Apps | (Points) |
- Mie Pearls
International career
| Years | Team | Apps | (Points) |
- Japan
National sevens team
| Years | Team | | Comps |
- Japan 7s

Yuki Sue (born 3 November 1993) is a Japanese rugby union player. She competed for Japan at the 2017 Women's Rugby World Cup.

== Biography ==
Sue started playing rugby at the age of three. She graduated from Nagasaki Nishi High School in 2012.

She later graduated from Tokyo Gakugei University in 2016 and became a city employee of Kumagaya City.

Sue was a member of the squad that won the 2016 Asia Rugby Women's Championship. She contributed to her team's 30–3 win against Hong Kong with a try in the 65th minute.

She has represented the Japanese women's sevens team. In 2017, she was selected in Japan's squad to the Women's Rugby World Cup in Ireland. She appeared in her sides 14–24 loss to Ireland at the UCD Bowl.
