= Becky Wood =

- Full name: Rebecca Jane Wood
- Born: 8 August 1987 (age 39)
- Height: 1.80 m (5 ft 11 in)
- Weight: 85 kg (187 lb)

Rugby union career
Provincial / State sides
| Years | Team | Apps | (Points) |
| | North Harbour | 2 | |
| 2014 | Auckland | | |
International career
| Years | Team | Apps | (Points) |
| 2017 | New Zealand | 7 | |
Medal record
Women's rugby union
Representing New Zealand
Women's Rugby World Cup
| Gold medal – first place | 2017 Ireland | Team competition |

Rebecca Jane Wood (born 8 August 1987) is a New Zealand rugby union player. She made her debut for the Black Ferns in the 2017 International Women's Rugby Series against Australia. She was selected for the Black Ferns squad to the 2017 Women's Rugby World Cup.

Wood is a firefighter by profession.
