= Yui Shiozaki =

- Born: 31 March 1998 (age 28)
- Height: 166 cm (5 ft 5 in)
- Weight: 66 kg (146 lb; 10 st 6 lb)

Rugby union career
- Position: Flanker
Senior career
Years	Team	Apps	(Points)
- Tokyo Sankyu Phoenix
International career
Years	Team	Apps	(Points)
- Japan

Yui Shiozaki (born 31 March 1998) is a Japanese rugby union player. She competed for Japan at the 2017 Women's Rugby World Cup.

== Background ==
Shiozaki began playing rugby in second grade. She attended Kitanakano Junior High School, and graduated from Tokyo Metropolitan Aoyama High School in 2016. She entered Keio University where she later graduated in 2020.

== Rugby career ==
In 2017, in a warm-up match against Wales, she scored her sides seventh try in their 52–10 victory at Ystrad Mynach. She was selected for the Japanese squad to the Women's Rugby World Cup in Ireland.
