= Ilse van Staden =

- Born: 25 March 1983 (age 43) Pretoria, South Africa
- Occupation: Butcher

Rugby union career
- Position: Prop
- Current team: Cooke
Provincial / State sides
Years	Team	Apps	(Points)
2002-2012	Blue Bulls	109	
2012–	Ulster	28	
International career
Years	Team	Apps	(Points)
2017–	Ireland		

Ilse van Staden (born 25 March 1983) is a South African-born Ireland women's rugby union player born in Pretoria, Gauteng, South Africa.

She plays for Cooke WRFC, Ulster Rugby and the Ireland women's national rugby union team as a front row player and is a qualified chef and butcher.

== Career ==
Van Staden started playing rugby for Correction Services Rugby Club in Pretoria, before she moved to Pretoria Harlequins. She also lined out for the University of Pretoria(TUKS) where she represented them in both 15s and 7s. During her time at Tuks she played various international 7s tournaments including Dubai, Reunion, Hong Kong and Rome.

She played provincial rugby for the Blue Bulls Rugby Union, where she made 109 appearances for them.

In 2011, she moved to Northern Ireland as part of a talent exchange programme where she started playing for Belfast Harlequins Ladies Rugby before moving to Cooke WRFC in 2013, eventually becoming their captain.

She made her provincial debut for Ulster in 2012 after being called up alongside fellow Ulster player Claire McLaughlin.

=== International career ===
When van Staden became eligible to represent Ireland though residency, she aimed for a call-up to the Ireland national team. In 2017, she made her debut in the Women's Six Nations Championship against the Scotland women's national rugby union team.

Later that year, she was not initially selected for Ireland's 2017 Women's Rugby World Cup campaign. However, due to an injury to prop Ruth O'Reilly, van Staden was called up as her replacement and played twice in the tournament.

== Personal life ==
Van Staden works as a butcher at a farm in Straid, County Antrim, Northern Ireland. While working at the farm, she helped to pioneer the production of South African biltong in Northern Ireland. She lives in Belfast.
