= Valley Fort RFC =

(Hong Kong) Valley Fort RFC
- Full name: Valley Fort Rugby Football Club
- Founded: 1978 as Stanley Fort Rugby Football Club
- Location: Stanley and Happy Valley, Hong Kong
- Ground(s): Stanley Fort (PLA barracks), Happy Valley sports ground
- Chairman: Steve Medeiros
- League(s): Hong Kong Mini Rugby Club League, Youth Rugby Club League
- 2020 / 21: Premiership & Championship
1st kit	2nd kit

Official website
- www.valleyfort.com

Valley Fort Rugby Football Club or Valley Fort RFC is one of the oldest mini and youth rugby clubs in Hong Kong, offering rugby for players 4–18 years of age. It follows the widespread Football Code of Rugby Union and is the Academy Section of Hong Kong Rugby Football Union Division One Club, Valley Rugby Football Club.

Valley Fort RFC was founded in the 1970s through the merger of two of Hong Kong’s oldest and most prestigious rugby clubs, Stanley Fort RFC and Valley RFC. The original training ground was Stanley Fort – at the time, the home of the British Garrison on Hong Kong Island. Some of the teams continue to train at the Fort. However, with over 650 playing members, it is now one of the largest junior clubs in Hong Kong and has expanded its training venues to Tai Tam, Aberdeen, and Happy Valley.

== Membership ==
Being a mini/youth rugby club, membership is through the youth players themselves; parents are not required to obtain a membership before their child can participate in rugby. Although there are no adult memberships, unlike the social norm practiced by a number of prominent social clubs which offer mini/youth rugby, parents get involved by taking up the role as a team manager or coach – usually in one group in which their own child plays. In other cases, these parents join the club council/committee and administer the club. Membership application is relatively straightforward. There are few formalities apart from annual membership renewal at the start of each season in August/September.

=== Notable players ===
- Andrew Kelly - former Edinburgh Rugby player. Scotland A. international.
- (New Zealand) Kevin Curtis - former Taranaki Rugby Union player.
- (England) Grant Livingston - former London Scottish player.
- Lee Jones - Hong Kong international.
- Niall Rowark - Hong Kong international.
- Salom Yiu - Hong Kong international.
- Ben Rimene - Hong Kong international.
- Jack Bennet - Hong Kong international.
- Kirk Munro - Hong Kong international.
- Justin Temara - Hong Kong international.
- Alex Ng - Hong Kong international.
- Andrew Bridle - Hong Kong international.
- Nick Hewson - Hong Kong international.
- Terence Montgomery - Hong Kong international.
- Alex Baddeley - Hong Kong international.

== Sponsors and affiliations ==
The club is a recognised member of the Hong Kong Rugby Football Union, and is affiliated to Valley RFC as their Rugby Academy Section. Valley RFC is an adult Rugby Football Club also offering Team-Hockey and Netball. The hockey and netball sections also have a Youth Academy.

== See also ==
- Hong Kong national rugby union team
- Hong Kong women's national rugby union team
- Hong Kong Sevens
