= Kevin Curtis (disambiguation) =

Kevin Curtis is an American football wide receiver.

Kevin Curtis may also refer to:

- Kevin Curtis (safety) (born 1980), American football coach and former safety
- Kevin Adam Curtis, filmmaker
- Kevin Curtis (rugby) for Valley Fort RFC
- Kevin Curtis (sailor), participated in Sailing at the 1996 Summer Paralympics
