= Riho Kurogi =

Japan international rugby union player

- Born: 2 May 1998 (age 28)
- Height: 166 cm (5 ft 5 in)
- Weight: 66 kg (146 lb; 10 st 6 lb)

Rugby union career
- Position: Center
International career
Years	Team	Apps	(Points)
2015–	Japan		
National sevens team
Years	Team		Comps
- Japan 7s
Medal record
Women's rugby sevens
Representing Japan
Asian Games
Gold medal – first place	2018 Jakarta–Palembang	Team

Riho Kurogi (born 2 May 1998) is a Japanese rugby union player. She competed for Japan at the 2017 Women's Rugby World Cup. She represented Japan in the 2020 Summer Olympics.

== Early career ==
Kurogi played soccer in elementary school. She switched to rugby in her first year of junior high school at Hyuga Rugby School Junior.

== Rugby career ==
In 2015, she was selected for the Japanese women's fifteens team at the age of 17. Her side won the Asian Women's Championship for the first time.

She featured for Japan in the Asia-Oceania regional qualification matches for the 2017 World Cup against Fiji and Hong Kong in 2016.

In July 2017, she was part of the team that successfully defended their Asian Championship title. She was eventually selected in Japan's squad to the Women's Rugby World Cup in Ireland.

She represented Japan in sevens at the 2019 Summer Universiade in Naples. She also competed in the Asian Women's Sevens Series a month later. Kurogi appeared for the side again in December during the Dubai leg of the 2019–20 World Series. However, she was injured in their match against New Zealand on Day 1 and was stretchered off in the first half.

In June 2021, she was initially selected as a reserve player for the Japanese women's sevens team for the delayed Tokyo Olympics. She was later called up to the main squad in July because of player injuries.
