= Amélie Seure =

HK international rugby union player

- Born: 17 August 1983 (age 43)
- Height: 1.7 m (5 ft 7 in)
- Weight: 71 kg (157 lb)

Rugby union career
International career
Years	Team	Apps	(Points)
2008–	Hong Kong		
National sevens team
Years	Team		Comps
- Hong Kong

Amélie Seure (born 17 August 1983) is a French-born Hong Kong rugby union and sevens player.

== Biography ==
Seure is initially from Grenoble in France. She studied at the Engineering school "Grenoble INP - Génie industriel" (Industrial Engineering & Management School at Grenoble Institute of Technology, UGA). She arrived in Hong Kong in 2005 to complete her MSc in Industrial Engineering at the University of Hong Kong. She graduated in 2016.

== Rugby career ==
=== Fifteens ===
Seure made her debut for Hong Kong in 2008. She represented Hong Kong at the 2017 Women's Rugby World Cup in Ireland. She was named in the fifteens team in 2016 for the Women's Rugby World Cup Qualifiers against Japan and Fiji.

=== Sevens ===
Seure was part of the Hong Kong sevens team who competed at the Olympic Repechage tournament in Dublin for the Rio Olympics. She was also selected in the squad as they pursued a spot in the 2017–18 World Rugby Women's Sevens Series.
