= Eriko Hirano =

Japan international rugby union player

- Born: 26 April 1992 (age 34)
- Height: 164 cm (5 ft 5 in)
- Weight: 61 kg (134 lb; 9 st 8 lb)

Rugby union career
- Position(s): Wing, Fullback
Senior career
Years	Team	Apps	(Points)
2015–	Yokohama TKM		
International career
Years	Team	Apps	(Points)
2016–	Japan		

Eriko Hirano (born 26 April 1992) is a Japanese rugby union player. She competed for Japan at the 2017 Women's Rugby World Cup.

== Early life ==
Originally from Ōtsuchi, Iwate, Hirano started playing rugby in first grade. She lost her home in the Great East Japan Earthquake in 2011, which struck ten days after she graduated from Kamaishi High School.

She graduated from Nippon Sport Science University in 2015.

== Rugby career ==
Hirano was selected to represent Japan in the women's sevens competition at the World University Championships in 2014. She joined Yokohama TKM in 2015.

In May 2016, she made her international debut for the Sakura fifteens against Hong Kong in the Asian Women's Championship. She scored a try in her side's 39–3 win over Hong Kong in the first game of their home and away series.

In 2017, she was selected in Japan's squad to the Women's Rugby World Cup in Ireland. She had a stint in Australia in 2018, she played for the Warringah Rugby Club while studying English for six months.

Hirano joined Spanish club, Corteva Cocos in 2020, in preparation for the Rugby World Cup in New Zealand. She later joined Azalea Seven in 2021.
