= Yokohama TKM =

Japanese women's rugby union club, based in Yokohama

- Full name: Yokohama Totsuka Kyoritsu Medical
- Union: Japan Rugby Football Union
- Founded: 2011; 15 years ago
- League: All-Japan Women's Rugby Championship
- 2026: Champion

Official website
- tkm7.jp

Yokohama TKM are a Japanese women's rugby union team based in Totsuka-ku, Yokohama in the Kanagawa Prefecture. They compete in the All-Japan Women's Rugby Championship in fifteens, and the Taiyo Life Women's Sevens Series in sevens.

== History ==
On 8 August 2011, the Yokohama Mirai Healthcare System Medical Corporation founded the women's seven-a-side rugby team, TKM7 (Totsuka Kyoritsu Medical Sevens Rugby Club).

In September 2012, seven players participated in the 23rd Kanto Women's Rugby Football Tournament as part of a 15-a-side joint team. In November, the team played in their first official match, at the inaugural Yokohama City Women's Sevens Tournament.

In August 2014, the team name was changed to "Yokohama TKM". In November, the team participated in the 1st National Women's Rugby Football Championship as a joint team with Arcas Kumagaya and Tokyo Phoenix, called "PTA15's".

In March 2017, TKM, Tokyo Phoenix and Arukas formed a joint team called "TPA" to compete in the 3rd National Women's Rugby Football Championship and won the tournament.

In April 2018, they placed third for the first time in the first round of the Taiyo Life Women's Sevens Series in Tokyo.

In 2022, they won their first tournament at the Kumagaya tournament in the Taiyo Life Women's Sevens Series. They also placed third overall for the first time in the annual rankings.

On 1 February 2026, they independently won the 12th edition of the All-Japan Women's Rugby Football Championship.

== Honours ==
- All-Japan Women's Rugby Championship:
  - Champion (1): 2026.
