= Montserrat Amédée =

France international rugby union player (born 1996)

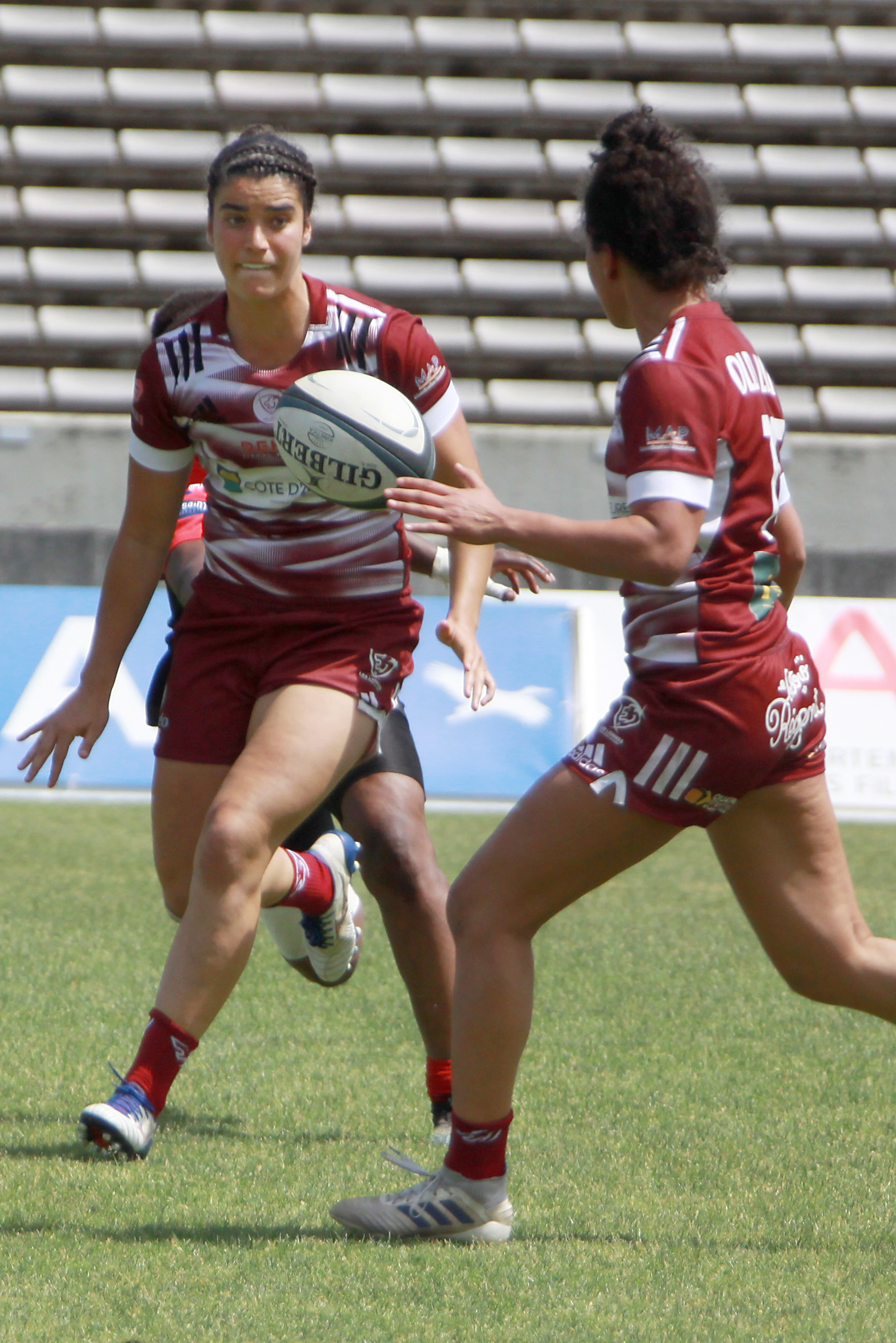
- Montserrat Amédée in 2022 (left)
- Born: 13 May 1996 (age 30) Agen, France
- Height: 174 cm (5 ft 9 in)

Rugby union career
- Position(s): Fullback, Fly-half
International career
Years	Team	Apps	(Points)
2017–	France		(0)
National sevens team
Years	Team		Comps
- France

Montserrat Amédée (born 13 May 1996) is a French rugby union and rugby sevens player.

== Biography ==
=== Early life and education ===
Before transitioning to rugby, Amédée practiced gymnastics for thirteen years and later handball for 2 years. In 2017, she was pursuing studies in Sports Science and Physical Education.

=== Club career ===
==== Agen ====
Amédée’s rugby career began in her hometown of Agen.

==== Blagnac SC (2013–2015) ====
In 2013, she joined Blagnac SC.

==== Montpellier RC (2015–2021) ====
In 2015, Amédée left her club Blagnac Saint-Orens to join Montpellier RC. Amédée Montserrat won three French championship titles with Montpellier.

==== Stade Bordelais (2021–present) ====
Amédée joined Stade Bordelais in 2021. She has since been an integral part of the team, contributing to their French Elite 1 Championship victories in the 2022–2023 and 2023–2024 seasons.

=== International career ===
==== Rio 2016 Olympics ====
Amédée was part of the preparation for the Rio 2016 Olympics but was not selected for the final squad.

==== 2017 Women's Rugby World Cup ====
Amédée made her debut for France at the 2017 Women's Rugby World Cup in Ireland.

==== 2018 Rugby World Cup Sevens ====
Amédée played for the French women's sevens team during the 2018 Rugby World Cup Sevens in San Francisco. The French team reached the final, where they were defeated by New Zealand, 29–0.

==== Tokyo 2020 Olympics ====
Amédée was not selected for the tournament.

==== 2022 Rugby World Cup Sevens ====
Amédée was part of the French women's sevens team during the 2022 Rugby World Cup Sevens held in Cape Town, South Africa. The French team lost to New Zealand in the semi-final, but proceed to secure the bronze medal against the USA.

==== Rugby sevens at the 2024 Summer Olympics ====
Amédée was not selected for the tournament.

==== 2025 Women's Six Nations ====
Amédée made her return to the French women's rugby team for the 2025 Women's Six Nations, having not played with the XV team since 2018. On March 29, 2025, she was selected to start for the match against Scotland in La Rochelle, filling in for Gabrielle Vernier.

== Honours ==
=== Montpellier RC ===
- French Championship (Élite 1 Féminine) : 2017, 2018, 2019

=== Stade Bordelais ===
- French Championship (Élite 1 Féminine) : 2023, 2024

=== National team ===
- Third in the Rugby World Cup in 2017
- Rugby Sevens World Cup finalist in 2018
- Third in the Rugby Sevens World Cup in 2022
