= Christiane Pheil =

American rugby union player

- Born: May 21, 1989 (age 37); St. Petersburg, Florida, U.S.
- Education: Asheville High School
- Alma mater: Pennsylvania State University; University of Colorado, Boulder
- Height: 5 ft 9 in (175 cm)
- Weight: 165 lb (75 kg)

Rugby union career
- Position: Loose forward
International career
Years	Team	Apps	(Points)
2016	United States	8	(-)

Christiane Pheil (born May 21, 1989) is an American rugby union player. She debuted for the United States in 2016. She was selected for the squad to the 2017 Women's Rugby World Cup in Ireland.

== Biography ==
Born in St. Petersburg, Florida to David and Carlyn Pheil. At Asheville High School she participated in tennis, track and field and cross country. Pheil started playing tennis since she was seven years old and attended the University of Colorado Boulder on a tennis scholarship.
