= Ai Tasaka =

- Born: 11 June 1991 (age 35)
- Height: 167 cm (5 ft 6 in)
- Weight: 63 kg (139 lb; 9 st 13 lb)

Rugby union career
- Position(s): Wing, Fullback
Senior career
| Years | Team | Apps | (Points) |
- Tokyo Sankyu Phoenix
- Arukas Queen Kumagaya
International career
| Years | Team | Apps | (Points) |
- Japan
National sevens team
| Years | Team | | Comps |
- Japan 7s

Ai Tasaka (born 11 June 1991) is a Japanese rugby union and sevens player. She competed for Japan at the 2017 Women's Rugby World Cup.

== Early life ==
Tasaka attended Saitama University's Elementary and Junior High Schools. She later attended Shukutoku Yono High School.

== Rugby career ==
Tasaka began playing rugby in college. She graduated from Nippon Sport Science University in 2014 and joined Akagi Nyugyo. She has represented the Japanese women's sevens team.

She competed at the 2014 Asia Women's Four Nations tournament in Hong Kong. She scored a try and successfully kicked a conversion in the Sakura's 37–5 win against Singapore in their opening game.

She captained the Sakura fifteens side that won the Asia Rugby Women's Championship for the first time in 2015. She also led the side when they won the championship again a year later.

In 2017, she was in the Sakura fifteens team that retained their Asian championship title. In August, she was subsequently selected in Japan's squad to the Women's Rugby World Cup in Ireland.

== Personal life ==
On 20 November 2023, she married Tsuyoshi Enokida, who worked as an interpreter for the Toyota Verblitz.
