= Laurel Chor =

- Born: 8 January 1990 (age 36)
- Height: 1.67 m (5 ft 6 in)
- Weight: 59 kg (130 lb)

Rugby union career
- Position: Wing
International career
Years	Team	Apps	(Points)
- Hong Kong

Laurel Chor (born 8 January 1990) is a Hong Kong photographer, journalist and filmmaker. She is also a rugby player and competed at the 2017 Women's Rugby World Cup, it was Hong Kong's first-ever World Cup appearance.

Chor graduated from Georgetown University with a Bachelor of Science in International Health and Development and is studying for a Master's degree in Biodiversity, Conservation and Management at Christ Church, Oxford.
