= Adrienne Garvey =

- Born: April 25, 1985 (age 41)
- Height: 1.66 m (5 ft 5 in)
- Weight: 67 kg (148 lb)

Rugby union career
- Position: Inside Centre
International career
Years	Team	Apps	(Points)
- Hong Kong
National sevens team
Years	Team		Comps
- Hong Kong

Adrienne Garvey (born 25 April 1985) is an English-born Hong Kong rugby union player. She was a member of Hong Kong's first-ever 2017 Women's Rugby World Cup team.

== Biography ==
Originally from England, Garvey moved to Hong Kong with her husband Chris in 2011. She studied at Loughborough University. She made her tenth Hong Kong Sevens appearance in 2015. Garvey was named in Hong Kong's squad for the 2017 Hong Kong Women's Sevens. It was a Women's Sevens Series qualifier tournament for the 2017–18 series.
