= Lau Sze-wa =

- Born: 7 December 1988 (age 37)
- Height: 1.61 m (5 ft 3 in)
- Weight: 55 kg (121 lb)

Rugby union career
- Position: Wing
International career
Years	Team	Apps	(Points)
- Hong Kong

Lau Sze-wa is a Hong Kong rugby union player. She was part of Hong Kong's historic 2017 Women's Rugby World Cup squad.
