= Chloe Mak =

- Born: 21 June 1995 (age 31)
- Height: 1.50 m (4 ft 11 in)
- Weight: 50 kg (110 lb)

Rugby union career
- Position: Scrum-half
International career
| Years | Team | Apps | (Points) |
| 2015– | Hong Kong | | |

Chloe Mak (born 21 June 1995) is a Hong Kong rugby union player. She was named in Hong Kong's squad to their first-ever World Cup in 2017. She was dubbed the shortest player at the World Cup.

== Biography ==
Mak made her international debut against Spain in 2015. She was selected again in 2017 to play in a test match against Spain. She made the squad again in their 2018 Autumn Tour of Spain and Wales.
