= All-Japan Women's Rugby Football Championship =

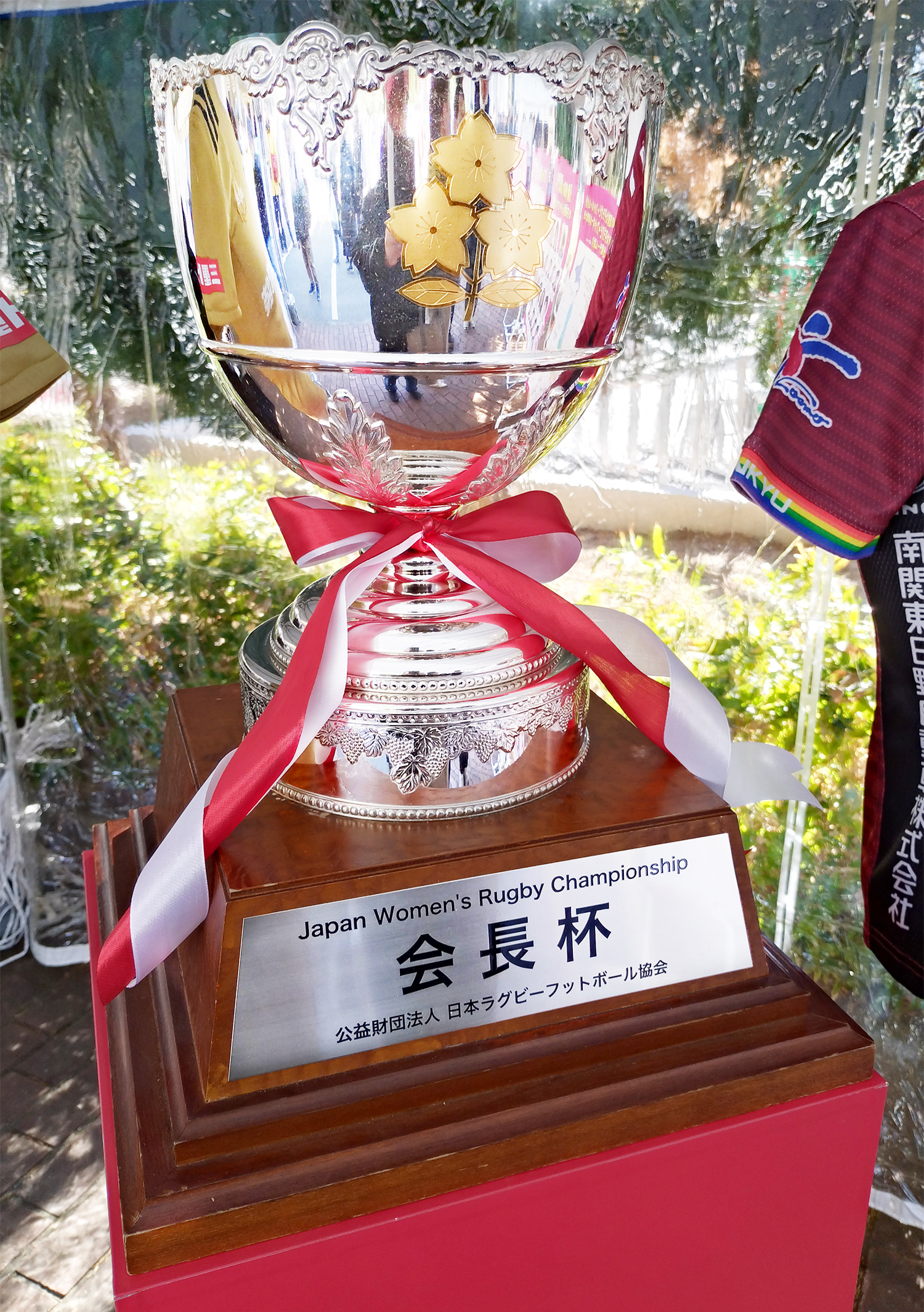
- Championship Trophy
- Formerly: National Women's Rugby Football Exchange Tournament (1988–2013)
- Sport: Rugby union
- Founded: 2014; 12 years ago
- No. of teams: 4
- Country: Japan
- Most recent champion: Yokohama TKM (1st title) (2026)
- Most titles: Nippon Sport Science University (4 titles)
- Website: en.rugby-japan.jp

The All-Japan Women's Rugby Football Championship is a national women's rugby tournament organized by the Japan Rugby Football Union (JRFU). It is held from January to February and features the winners and runners-up of the Kanto Women's Rugby Football Tournament, and the Kansai Women's Rugby Football Tournament.

== History ==
=== National Women's Rugby Football Exchange Tournament ===
The competition was initially established as the National Women's Rugby Football Exchange Tournament in 1988. It was a fifteens competition created to foster friendships between women's teams and those involved in women's rugby across the country, and to promote the healthy development and expansion of the base of women's rugby.

In 1996, the Loggers, a North Pacific team from the United States, was invited to participate in the tournament. Between 2001 and 2006, there were friendly matches held for elementary school girls.

Starting in 2012, the JRFU Chairman's Cup was added to the All-Japan Women's Rugby Exchange Tournament, with 40-minute half-matches to determine the best team in Japan.

=== All-Japan Women's Rugby Football Championship ===
In 2014, the tournament was revamped and renamed the "All-Japan Women's Rugby Football Championship", with the aim of motivating players hoping to compete in the Women's Rugby World Cup, and generally to improve competitiveness at the national level. On 23 November that year, the first tournament was held at Edogawa Stadium.

From 2017 to 2022, the tournament format was in flux due to the decline in women's team participants and due to the COVID-19 pandemic measures since 2020, also participation by joint teams became more prominent. The 2017 and 2018 tournaments included a high school division, with the general division held in March and the finals in November.

The tournament's 6th edition was held on 9 February 2020, with the Yokogawa Musashino Artemi-Stars and RKU Ryugasaki Grace ending the championship in a draw. Later that month, restrictions were imposed due to the COVID-19 pandemic, and events across Japan were canceled in succession. The restrictions were lifted three years later, on 8 May 2023.

In 2021, only the championship final was held and without any spectators. The winners of the Kanto Women's Rugby Football Tournament, the Morning Bears, played the Mie Pearls who were chosen since the Kansai Women's Rugby Football Tournament could not be held. In 2022, 17 players from Mie Pearls were quarantined, so the team withdrew from the semi-finals.

Beginning in 2023, the tournament will consist of only the semi-finals and final, and will be held from January to February between the winners and runners-up of both the Kanto, and Kansai Women's Rugby Football Tournaments. The 2024 final also featured a match between League One's Tokyo Suntory Sungoliath and the Blues from Super Rugby.

In 2025, the two semi-finals were held alongside League One matches. The final was held at the Chichibunomiya Rugby Stadium with the Tokyo Sankyu Phoenix becoming the first team to win three consecutive tournaments.

The two semi-final matches in 2026 was held alongside League One matches, as in the previous year. The final between Yokohama TKM and Yokogawa Musashino Artemi-Stars was held at Chichibunomiya Rugby Stadium. It concluded with TKM winning their first title as an independent team.

== All-Japan Women's Rugby Football Championship finals ==
Ed.	Date	Champion	Score	Runner-up	Venue
1	2014-11-23	Nippon Sport Science University	46–5	Nagoya Ladies RFC	Edogawa Stadium
2	2015-11-23	Nippon Sport Science University	38–7	Nagoya Ladies RFC	Edogawa Stadium
3	2017-03-19	TPA (Yokohama TKM, Tokyo Sankyu Phoenix, Arukas Queen Kumagaya)	60–12	VEELS (Otemon Gakuin University, Mie Pearls)	Paloma Mizuho Rugby Stadium
4	2018-03-18	Nippon Sport Science University	99–5	Mie Pearls, Neyagawa WRFC	Paloma Mizuho Rugby Stadium
5	2019-03-03	Nippon Sport Science University	8–7	Blue Peaglets (Mie Pearls, Nagato Blue Angels, Shikoku University)	Odawara City Shiroyama Athletics Stadium
6	2020-02-09	Yokogawa Musashino Artemi-Stars; RKU Ryugasaki Grace	7–7	(Draw)	Kumagaya Rugby Stadium
7	2021-02-21	Mie Pearls	41–10	Morning Bears (Japan Self-Defense Forces Physical Training School, Arukas Queen Kumagaya)	Paloma Mizuho Rugby Stadium
8	2022-01-23	Yokogawa Musashino Artemi-Stars	28–0	Japan University of Economics, Kyushu Sangyo University, Nagato Blue Angels	Mie Suzuka Sports Garden
9	2023-02-05	Tokyo Sankyu Phoenix	27–24	Nippon Sport Science University	Odawara City Shiroyama Athletics Stadium
10	2024-02-03	Tokyo Sankyu Phoenix	40–24	Mie Pearls	Chichibunomiya Rugby Stadium
11	2025-02-02	Tokyo Sankyu Phoenix	13–5	Mie Pearls	Chichibunomiya Rugby Stadium
12	2026-02-01	Yokohama TKM	21–12	Yokogawa Musashino Artemi-Stars	Chichibunomiya Rugby Stadium
