= Sayaka Suzuki =

Japan international rugby union player

- Born: 19 May 1997 (age 29)
- Height: 165 cm (5 ft 5 in)
- Weight: 60 kg (132 lb; 9 st 6 lb)

Rugby union career
- Position: Wing
Senior career
Years	Team	Apps	(Points)
- Yokohama TKM
International career
Years	Team	Apps	(Points)
- Japan
National sevens team
Years	Team		Comps
- Japan 7s

Sayaka Suzuki (born 19 May 1997) is a Japanese rugby union player. She competed for Japan at the 2017 Women's Rugby World Cup.

== Rugby career ==
Suzuki started playing rugby at the age of 16. After graduating from Abiko High School in 2016, she attended Ryukoku University.

In 2017, she was selected in the Japanese squad to the Women's Rugby World Cup in Ireland.

Suzuki was a member of the Sakura's sevens team for the 2018 Rugby World Cup Sevens that was held in San Francisco. She graduated from Ryutsu Keizai University in 2020 and joined Yokohama TKM.

In 2021, she was selected as a non-travelling reserve for the Japanese women's sevens team for the delayed Tokyo Olympics.
