= Wasana Fukushima =

- Born: 7 January 1996 (age 30)
- Height: 165 cm (5 ft 5 in)
- Weight: 65 kg (143 lb; 10 st 3 lb)

Rugby union career
- Position: Fly-half
Senior career
Years	Team	Apps	(Points)
- Tokyo Sankyu Phoenix
International career
Years	Team	Apps	(Points)
- Japan
National sevens team
Years	Team		Comps
2014–	Japan 7s		

Wasana Fukushima (born 7 January 1996) is a Japanese rugby union player. She competed for Japan at the 2017 Women's Rugby World Cup.

== Career ==
Fukushima started playing rugby at the age of five.

In February 2014, she made her international debut for the Japanese women's sevens team during the 2013–14 Sevens World Series. She then graduated from Iwami Chisuikan High School, and entered Otemon Gakuin University.

In June 2014, she ruptured her anterior cruciate ligament in her right knee and was forced to leave the sevens team. She returned to the side in March 2015.

In 2017, she was selected for Japan's fifteens squad to the Women's Rugby World Cup in Ireland. She was injured during the tournament and returned to Japan early.

Fukushima graduated from Otemon Gakuin University in 2018, she then joined Toppan.
