= Tsang Sin-yan =

- Born: 23 September 1992 (age 34)
- Height: 1.69 m (5 ft 7 in)
- Weight: 63 kg (139 lb)

Rugby union career
- Position: Forward
International career
Years	Team	Apps	(Points)
- Hong Kong

Tsang Sin-yan (born 23 September 1992) is a Hong Kong rugby union player. She was selected for Hong Kong's squad when they made their first Rugby World Cup appearance in 2017.
