= Winnie Siu =

- Born: 18 December 1993 (age 32)
- Height: 1.6 m (5 ft 3 in)
- Weight: 58 kg (128 lb)

Rugby union career
- Position: Forward
International career
Years	Team	Apps	(Points)
2013–	Hong Kong		

Winnie Siu (born 18 December 1993) is a Hong Kong rugby union player. She competed for Hong Kong at the 2017 Women's Rugby World Cup.

In December 2024, she celebrated her 100th cap for the USRC Tigers RFC premiership team.

== Biography ==
Siu was named in Hong Kong's training squad in their preparation for the World Cup repechage tournament against Japan and Fiji in 2016. She featured in their match against Fiji as they overwhelmed the Pacific Island nation 45–7.

Siu started in the first test match against Spain in their autumn international tour of 2018. She played in the 2019 Asia Pacific Championship tournament against Fiji and Samoa.
