= Ed Rolston =

Edmund Rolston
- Born: Edmund Rolston; 12 August 1990 (age 36) Hong Kong
- Height: 1.89 m (6 ft 2 in)
- Weight: 94 kg (14 st 11 lb)
- School: South Island School
- University: Loughborough University

Rugby union career
- Position: Wing
Senior career
Years	Team	Apps	(Points)
2010–2011	Leicester Tigers		
- Valley RFC
International career
Years	Team	Apps	(Points)
- Hong Kong
National sevens team
Years	Team		Comps
2009	Hong Kong 7s		

Ed Rolston (born 12 August 1990) is a Hong Kong former international rugby union player. He is the youngest ever Hong Kong international, having represented Hong Kong at all age groups from under 14s through to the senior team when he was capped aged 17 years 4 months and 25 days. He was a member of the Hong Kong rugby academy and captained the Hong Kong Under 18s and Under 20s. His previous clubs are Loughborough Students RUFC (2009–2012, national division 1) where he represented the senior 1st team in 30 starts scoring 25 tries.

He played with Leicester Tigers for the 2010–2011 season and was part of the team that won the Aviva A League. He was also a member of the Leicester Tigers 1st team squad for the 2011–2012 season. He returned to Hong Kong in 2015 and now plays for the premiership side Valley RFC.

He has also represented Hong Kong in 7s, notably in the Hong Kong 7s in 2009 and the World Games in Kaohsiung in 2009.

He was part of the team that had Loughborough Students promoted to National division 1 and was the only Loughborough player to score in the losing playoff game against Jersey in 2011.

He was forced to retire from playing rugby in 2017 aged 26, due to a neck injury. He had already sought work as an actor, and it was reported that soon after leaving the sport he was involved in several media projects and the management of a restaurant.
