= Lee Tsz-ting =

- Born: 25 April 1996 (age 30) Hong Kong
- Height: 1.6 m (5 ft 3 in)
- Weight: 62 kg (137 lb)

Rugby union career
- Position: Fly-half
International career
Years	Team	Apps	(Points)
- Hong Kong
National sevens team
Years	Team		Comps
- Hong Kong

Lee Tsz-ting (born 25 April 1996) is a Hong Kong rugby union player. She was selected for Hong Kong's 2017 Women's Rugby World Cup squad. She made her ninth cap appearance against New Zealand at Fly-half.

Lee studied at Hong Kong Polytechnic University. The 2016 Hong Kong Women's Sevens was her first Hong Kong event.
