= Tammy Lau Nga-wun =

- Born: 30 July 1992 (age 34)
- Height: 1.61 m (5 ft 3 in)
- Weight: 74 kg (163 lb)

Rugby union career
- Position: Prop
International career
Years	Team	Apps	(Points)
2013–Present	Hong Kong		

Tammy Lau Nga-wun (born 30 July 1992) is a Hong Kong rugby union player. She competed for Hong Kong when they debuted at the 2017 Women's Rugby World Cup in Dublin.

== Rugby career ==
=== 2016 ===
In 2016, Lau was named Women's Premiership Player of the Year by the Hong Kong Rugby Union at their annual end-of-season awards night.

Lau featured for Hong Kong against Japan at the 2016 Asia Women's Championship. She played in the warm-up match against Singapore prior to the final leg of the Championship series. She scored a try in her sides 40–7 routing of Singapore. Later in November, she was selected in Hong Kong's training squad as they prepared for the World Cup qualifiers against Fiji and Japan.

=== 2017–2024 ===
She was part of Hong Kong's historic side that debuted at the 2017 Women's Rugby World Cup in Dublin. She started in the match against eventual champions, New Zealand.

Lau was selected for Hong Kong's two-test tour of Spain and Wales at the end of 2018. She was in the Hong Kong squad that won their first test match and test series in Europe against the Netherlands.

She was in the starting line-up that faced Japan in the opening match of the 2024 Asia Rugby Women's Championship.
