= Mizuho Kataoka =

- Born: 11 October 1994 (age 32) Tokyo
- Height: 1.59 m (5 ft 3 in)
- Weight: 67 kg (148 lb)

Rugby union career
- Position: Hooker
Provincial / State sides
Years	Team	Apps	(Points)
2023	Auckland Storm	8	(5)
International career
Years	Team	Apps	(Points)
2014–	Japan		

Mizuho Kataoka (片岡瑞帆, born 11 October 1994 ) is a Japanese women's rugby union player. She competed for Japan at the 2017 Women's Rugby World Cup.

== Early career ==
She started playing rugby in high school. After graduating from Shiba Commercial High School in 2013, she entered Nippon Sport Science University. In 2015, she was appointed captain of the women's team at Nippon Sport Science University.

== Rugby career ==
She competed at the 2014, 2016, and the 2017 Asia Rugby Championship's. In 2017, she was named in Japan's squad for the Rugby World Cup in Ireland.

In 2023, Kataoka had a stint with the Auckland Storm in the Farah Palmer Cup competition.
