= Royce Chan =

Hong Kong rugby union player

- Born: 16 September 1978 (age 48)
- Height: 1.61 m (5 ft 3 in)

Rugby union career
- Position: Forward
International career
Years	Team	Apps	(Points)
	Hong Kong	28	(0)
National sevens team
Years	Team		Comps
- Hong Kong
Coaching career
- Years: Team
- 2022–: Hong Kong

Royce Chan Leong-sze (born 16 September 1978) is a former Hong Kong rugby union player. She has represented Hong Kong internationally in rugby fifteens and sevens. She competed at the 2017 Women's Rugby World Cup in Ireland.

== Biography ==
Chan retired after the 2017 World Cup, she currently works as a women's high performance coach at the Hong Kong Rugby Union. She captained the Hong Kong women's sevens team at the 2014 Hong Kong Women's Sevens. It was her ninth Hong Kong Women's Sevens appearance. She made her tenth appearance in the tournament in 2015.

In 2019 she was nominated for the Women's Sports Leadership Academy for High Performance Coaches (WSLA). It was a programme partnered by World Rugby and the International Olympic Committee.

Chan was announced as Head of Women’s Rugby Performance by the Hong Kong Rugby Union on 8 March 2023. She had coached Hong Kong at the 2022 Asia Rugby Women's Championship when they beat Kazakhstan to win the series.
