= Andrew Kelly (rugby union, born 1982) =

Scottish rugby union player (born 1982)

Andy Kelly
- Born: Andrew James Kelly; 2 June 1982 (age 44)
- Height: 6 ft 1 in (1.85 m)
- Weight: 104 kg (229 lb)
- School: Stewart's Melville College

Rugby union career
- Position: Hooker
Amateur team(s)
Years	Team	Apps	(Points)
- Stewart's Melville
2013-17	Valley RFC		
Senior career
Years	Team	Apps	(Points)
2003-13	Edinburgh		
International career
Years	Team	Apps	(Points)
-	Scotland U18		
–	Scotland U19		
–	Scotland U21		
–	Scotland 'A'		
Coaching career
- Years: Team
- 2017–: Valley RFC
- –: Hong Kong (Asst. coach)

Andrew Kelly (born 2 June 1982) is a Scottish rugby union coach who coaches Valley RFC in Hong Kong. He previously played for Edinburgh Rugby in the Pro14. He played at Hooker.

== Rugby Union career ==
=== Amateur career ===
Kelly started his rugby career alongside former Edinburgh centre Matt Dey at Stewart’s Melville College where they won the Scottish Schools Cup in 1999.

After 10 years at Edinburgh, Andrew re-located to Hong Kong where he played for Valley RFC for 4 consecutive winning seasons.

=== Professional career ===
He represented Edinburgh at age-grade at under-16, under-18, and under-19 before playing for the senior side.

=== International career ===
Kelly has represented Scotland at under-18, under-19, and under-21 grades. His international under-19 games included starting in all four in the 2001 FIRA World Junior Championship in Santiago, Chile, and scoring a try against Japan in the final match there.

Kelly was capped at Scotland 'A' international.

=== Coaching career ===
He was appointed head coach of Valley RFC.

He is also now the assistant coach of the Hong Kong national side.
