= Rose Hopewell-Fong =

Rose Hopewell-Fong is a Hong Kong rugby union player. She represented Hong Kong when they made their World Cup debut in 2017 in Ireland.

== Biography ==
Hopewell-Fong has represented Hong Kong in fifteens and sevens. She has a Master's degree in International Education from the University of Sunderland. In 2015 She retired from playing sevens rugby.
