= Aoi Mimura =

Japan international rugby union player

- Born: 24 August 1989 (age 37)
- Height: 168 cm (5 ft 6 in)
- Weight: 66 kg (146 lb; 10 st 6 lb)

Rugby union career
- Position: Lock
Senior career
Years	Team	Apps	(Points)
- Yokohama TKM
International career
Years	Team	Apps	(Points)
- Japan
National sevens team
Years	Team		Comps
2013–	Japan 7s		

Aoi Mimura (born 24 August 1989) is a Japanese rugby union player. She competed for Japan at the 2017 Women's Rugby World Cup.

== Early career ==
After graduating from Asuwa High School in 2008, she joined Yamanashi Gakuin University. She played basketball until college. She graduated Yamanashi Gakuin University in 2012.

== Rugby career ==
Mimura made her international sevens debut for Japan in 2013, she suffered a serious knee injury in a match against China. She had torn the ligaments in her right knee, which took her a year to recover.

She joined Yokohama TKM after graduating from university.

In December 2016, she participated in the regional qualifiers for the Women's Rugby World Cup.

In 2017, she was part of the Japanese side that won their third Asian Rugby Championship. She was selected in the Sakura fifteens side to the Women's Rugby World Cup in Ireland.
