= 2015 Hong Kong Women's Sevens =

- Host nation: Hong Kong
- Date: 26–27 March

Cup
- Champion: Canada
- Runner-up: Japan

Plate
- Winner: China
- Runner-up: Samoa

Bowl
- Winner: Papua New Guinea
- Runner-up: Tunisia

Tournament details
- Matches played: 34

The 2015 Hong Kong Women's Sevens was the 18th edition of the tournament. It took place between 26–27 March 2015. Canada won their third consecutive Hong Kong title. The event also marked the debut of Argentina and Mexico as the 38th and 39th international unions to participate in Hong Kong since 1997.

== Tournament ==
=== Pool stages ===
==== Pool A ====
Nation	Won	Drawn	Lost	For	Against
Canada	3	0	0	139	0
Samoa	2	0	1	51	43
Argentina	1	0	2	54	59
Mexico	0	0	3	0	135

- Canada 31-7 Samoa
- Argentina 42-0 Mexico
- Canada 66-0 Mexico
- Argentina 12-17 Samoa
- Samoa 27-0 Mexico
- Canada 42-0 Argentina

==== Pool B ====
Nation	Won	Drawn	Lost	For	Against
Hong Kong	3	0	0	89	19
Kazakhstan	2	0	1	60	31
China	1	0	2	38	69
Singapore	0	0	3	17	88

- China 7-26 Kazakhstan
- Hong Kong 41-0 Singapore
- China 17-12 Singapore
- Hong Kong 17-5 Kazakhstan
- Kazakhstan 29-7 Singapore
- Hong Kong 31-14 China

==== Pool C ====
Nation	Won	Drawn	Lost	For	Against
Japan	3	0	0	95	19
Netherlands	2	0	1	67	36
Tunisia	1	0	2	31	66
Papua New Guinea	0	0	3	19	91

- Japan 43-7 Papua New Guinea
- Netherlands 33-5 Tunisia
- Japan 33-0 Tunisia
- Netherlands 22-12 Papua New Guinea
- Papua New Guinea 0-26 Tunisia
- Japan 19-12 Netherlands

=== Knockout stages ===
==== Bowl ====
Semi-finals
Tunisia	32
Mexico	0
Papua New Guinea	29
Singapore	0

Bowl Final
Papua New Guinea	12
Tunisia	0
11th Place
Singapore	12
Mexico	0

==== Plate ====
Semi-finals
China	26
Kazakhstan	5
Samoa	19
Argentina	17

Plate Final
China	19
Samoa	0
7th Place
Kazakhstan	19
Argentina	5

==== Cup ====
Quarter-finals
Canada	24
China	7
Netherlands	31
Kazakhstan	0
Japan	43
Argentina	5
Hong Kong	25
Samoa	0

Semi-finals
Canada	17
Netherlands	12
Japan	10
Hong Kong	5

Cup Final
Canada	19
Japan	12
3rd Place
Netherlands	14
Hong Kong	7
