= Wakana Fukushima =

- 福島 和可菜
- Born: 2 December 1982 (age 43); Hakodate, Hokkaido, Japan
- Other names: Wakanan
- Occupations: Tarento; marathon runner
- Years active: 2005–
- Height: 165 cm (5 ft 5 in)

Wakana Fukushima (福島 和可菜, Fukushima Wakana; born 2 December 1982, in Hakodate, Hokkaido) is a Japanese tarento, actress, Reserve Self-Defense Official, marathon runner and ultramarathon runner. She is nicknamed Wakanan (ワカナン) and Wackana (ワッカーナ, Wakkāna). She is represented with N Force Promotion from Sun Music Production.

Fukushima graduated from Hokkaido Hakodate Technical High School.

== Main results/records ==
Year	Convention	Distance	Rank	Record
2006	2006 Honolulu Marathon	Full marathon		5 hours, 5 minutes
2010	OSJ Ontake Ultra Trail 100 km	100 km	4th in Women Over 20	19 hours, 24 minutes 44 seconds
2011	Salomon The 4100D; Mount Trail in Nozawaonsen 65K	65 km	1st in women over 20	15 hours, 53 minutes
2012	OSJ Ontake Ultra Trail 100 km	100 km	2nd in Women Over 20	15 hours, 42 minutes, 14 seconds
2014	Reebok Spartan Race	7 km (obstacle)	4th in Sprinting	1 hour, 9 minutes, 41 seconds
2014	Osaka Marathon	Full marathon		3 hours, 26 minutes
2015	4th Chofu Tenke Marathon	10 km		39 minutes, 43 seconds
2015	1st Oku Mikawa Power Trail	63 km	Women's Overall Victory	10 hours, 10 minutes, 27 seconds
2015	Northern Horse Park Marathon 2015	Half+Trail (7 km)	2nd in Women	1 hour, 30 minutes, 56 seconds + 30 minutes, 51 seconds (Trail)
2015	Osaka Marathon	Full marathon		3 hours, 9 minutes
2015	1st Fun Trails 50K Two Lakes & Grwwn Line	50 km	2nd in Women	8 hours, 4 minutes, 31 seconds
2016	2016 High Tech Half Marathon	Half		1 hour, 27 minutes, 17 seconds
2016	Tokyo Marathon	Full marathon		3 hours, 3 minutes, 42 seconds
2016	Chicago Marathon 2016	Full marathon		2 hours, 59 minutes, 5 seconds
2017	Tokyo Marathon	Full marathon		2 hours, 57 minutes, 51 seconds

=== TV programmes ===
Year	Title	Network
	Yari-sugi Koji	TV Tokyo
	Joyū Tamashī	CTV
	Monomane Battle	NTV
2007	Jikuu Keisatsu Wecker Signa	Tokyo MX
2009	Natsuki Katō-Takatoshi Kaneko BS4 Satellite Navi	BS NTV
2009	All-Star Thanksgiving	Tokyo MX
2010	NNN News Real Time	NTV
2010	Marika & Yumiko no Maō Densetsu	TV Saitama
2010	news every.	NTV
2011	Shikaku Habataku	NHK-E
2011	Ukeuri!!	NTV
2011	Teens Project: Fure Fure	NHK-E
2012	Piramekino	TV Tokyo
2012	Tōhoku Genkidesu! TV	KHB
2014	Honma dekka!? TV	Fuji TV
2015	Arigato'!	tvk

=== Radio programmes ===
Year	Title	Network
2009	Magical Snowland	Nack5
2010	Room to Room	FM Fuji
2010	Kazuo Tokumitsu: Toku Mori! Kayō Sunday	NBS
2010	Buddy 2 with Buddy!	FM Fuji
2012	Jo-Spo	Nack5
2012	Nack5 Countdown Special 2012-2013	Nack5
	Wakana Fukushima no Let's Go! Go Out Sunday!!	FM Fuji
	Route 847	FM Yokohama
	Jog Station	FM Yokohama

=== Advertisements ===
Year	Title
2010	Sato Foods "Sato no Kirimochi"

== Works ==
=== CD ===
Year	Title	Ref.
2011	"Smile choi Tashi, Genki choi Tashi"	
2012	"Hello & Sunshine"	

=== DVD ===
Year	Title	Code
2005	BS–Utsukushiki Senshi	ISBN 978-4812423189

=== Photo albums ===
Year	Title	Book code
2005	Wakana Fukushima Shashin-shū	ISBN 978-4812422984
