= Colleen Tjosvold =

Hong Kong rugby union and sevens player

- Born: March 30, 1989 (age 37)
- Height: 1.7 m (5 ft 7 in)
- Weight: 66 kg (146 lb)

Rugby union career
International career
| Years | Team | Apps | (Points) |
- Hong Kong
National sevens team
| Years | Team | | Comps |
| 2007– | Hong Kong | | |

Colleen Jenny Tjosvold (born 30 March 1989) is a Hong Kong rugby union and sevens player. She was named in Hong Kong's historic 2017 Rugby World Cup squad. It was their first appearance at a World Cup.

== Biography ==
Tjosvold started playing rugby when she was 10. She graduated from Carleton College in 2011, she majored in Political Science and International Relations. She competed at the 2019 Hong Kong Women's Sevens, it was a World Rugby Sevens Series qualifier for the 2019–20 series. She was named in Hong Kong's squad for the 2019 Asia Pacific Championship in Fiji.

Tjosvold earned her first international cap at the 2007 Asian Sevens in Doha.
