= Claire McLaughlin =

Claire Small (Née McLaughlin)
- Born: Claire McLaughlin; 21 November 1991 (age 34) Bushmills, Northern Ireland
- University: Queen's University Belfast
- Occupation: Doctor

Rugby union career
- Position(s): Centre, Back Row
- Current team: Ulster, Ireland
Senior career
Years	Team	Apps	(Points)
.	Ballymoney		
–	Cooke		
–	Queen's University		
–	Old Belvedere R.F.C		
Provincial / State sides
Years	Team	Apps	(Points)
.	Ulster		
International career
Years	Team	Apps	(Points)
2015–	Ireland		

Claire Small (née McLaughlin) (born 21 November 1991) is a women's rugby union player from Bushmills, County Antrim, Northern Ireland, and a qualified doctor. She plays for Ulster Rugby and the Ireland women's national rugby union team as a back row, having previously played in the centre.

== Early life and education ==
Small (née McLaughlin) was born on 21 November 1991 and is the daughter of John McLaughlin, a beef farmer, and his wife Pamela, a teacher. She has two brothers. She grew up on a farm. She was educated at Coleraine High School in Coleraine, County Londonderry. After this she studied medicine at Queen's University, Belfast.

== Career ==
Following graduation, she spent her foundation year as a junior doctor at Mater Infirmorum Hospital, Belfast. At the hospital, her colleagues gave her the nickname of "McSwaplin", since she often swapped shifts at the hospital to accommodate her rugby schedule. Claire has been at the forefront of the NHS battle against COVID19 working the Ulster Hospital A&E Department throughout the pandemic.

McLaughlin's introduction to rugby was through playing tag rugby at school, and she later joined Ballymoney RFC. After moving to Belfast, McLaughlin started playing for Cooke WRFC before changing to Queen's University RFC. She made her debut for Ulster aged 18 while still at university. She made her debut for the Ireland women's national rugby union team in 2015. She was selected for Ireland's 2017 Women's Rugby World Cup squad as one of only two Ulster players selected. McLaughlin was named as a substitute for Ireland's opening match against the Australia women's national rugby union team at the UCD Bowl in Dublin, Republic of Ireland.

Claire is currently recovering and rehabbing from a serious ankle injury.

== Personal life ==
McLaughlin is a Christian. While playing rugby, she wears wrist tape with "AO1" on it to give thanks to God for her career. McLaughlin is also a trained pianist, having played the keyboard and organ in church. Mclaughlin married in the summer of 2021 to Jonny Small and goes by the name of Claire Small (née McLaughlin).
