= Mayu Shimizu =

Japanese rugby sevens player

- Born: 19 January 1998 (age 28) Takasaki, Gunma, Japan
- Height: 164 cm (5 ft 5 in)

Rugby union career
- Position(s): Centre, Fullback
International career
Years	Team	Apps	(Points)
2017–	Japan		(0)
National sevens team
Years	Team		Comps
- Japan

Mayu Shimizu (清水麻有, born 19 January 1998) is a Japanese rugby union and sevens player. She competed for Japan at the 2017 Women's Rugby World Cup. She also represented Japan at the 2020 Summer Olympics.

== Early life and career ==
Shimizu started playing rugby in third grade of elementary school. After graduating from Tonodai Second High School in 2016, she entered Nippon Sport Science University.

== Rugby career ==
Shimizu featured for Japan in 2016 during their 55–0 win over Fiji at the Asia-Oceania qualifiers for the 2017 Rugby World Cup.

In 2017, she represented the Sakura sevens in the Kitakyushu leg of the Women’s Sevens Series in April. She was then selected in the Japanese fifteens team for the Women's Rugby World Cup in Ireland. She converted her own try in her sides loss to Ireland, despite them leading up until the 65th minute.

In 2021, she was selected as a member of the Japanese women's sevens team for the delayed Tokyo Olympics.

== Personal life ==
Her younger brother, Maki Shimizu, previously played for the Kobelco Kobe Steelers. She graduated from Nippon Sport Science University in 2020, and went on to study at the university's graduate school.
