= Mie Pearls =

Japanese women's rugby union club, based in Yokkaichi

Mie Women's Rugby Football Club Pearls
- Full name: Mie Women's Rugby Football Club Pearls
- Union: Japan Rugby Football Union
- Nickname: Mie Pearls
- Founded: 2016; 10 years ago
- Location: Yokkaichi, Mie, Japan
- League: All-Japan Women's Rugby Championship
- 2025: Runner-up
Team kit

Official website
- mie-pearls.com

Mie Women's Rugby Football Club Pearls (commonly known as Mie Pearls) is a Japanese women's rugby union team based in Yokkaichi, Mie. They compete in the All-Japan Women's Rugby Championship.

== History ==
The Mie Women's Rugby Football Club Pearls was established in May 2016 with the slogan "From Mie to the World!". Their aim is to become number one in Japan's domestic tournaments and to develop players who can perform on the world stage.

Mie Pearls won the 2020–21 National Women’s Rugby Championship competition.

=== MoU deal with Chiefs Manawa ===
In 2024, Mie Pearls signed a memorandum of understanding (MoU) with the Chiefs Manawa of New Zealand's Super Rugby Aupiki competition. The agreement operates alongside the existing MoU that New Zealand Rugby and the Japan Rugby Football Union has already established. Furthermore, the deal allows both clubs to "explore opportunities that enhance the game for players, coaches and management through the sharing of knowledge and resources".

Mie Pearls met Tokyo Sankyu Phoenix for the 2023–2024 National Women’s Rugby Championship final which was played for the first time at the Chichibunomiya Rugby Stadium. They were defeated by Tokyo Sankyu Phoenix 24–40.

== Coaching staff ==
Position	Name
General Manager	Hisashi Saito
Head Coach	Janna Vaughan
Asst. Coach / Asst. Manager	Takashi Tomikawa
S&C Coach	Luke Vasu
Trainer	Yuko Shinzaki
Team Manager	Emi Ito
