= Karen So =

- Born: 27 April 1990 (age 36)
- Height: 1.65 m (5 ft 5 in)
- Weight: 72 kg (159 lb)

Rugby union career
- Position: Hooker
International career
Years	Team	Apps	(Points)
2013–	Hong Kong		

Karen So (born 27 April 1990) is a Hong Kong rugby union player. She represented Hong Kong at the 2017 Women's Rugby World Cup as they made their first World Cup appearance.

== Biography ==
So lived in Canada for 18 years before she moved back to Hong Kong at the age of 22. She studied at the University of Hong Kong. In 2018 she was given the captaincy role in Hong Kong's autumn tour of Spain and Wales. She captained the team again in 2019 as they faced Fiji and Samoa in the Asia Pacific Championship in Fiji.
