= 2014 Hong Kong Women's Sevens =

- Host nation: Hong Kong
- Date: 28 March

Cup
- Champion: Canada
- Runner-up: France

Plate
- Winner: Kazakhstan
- Runner-up: China

Bowl
- Winner: Hong Kong
- Runner-up: Kenya

Tournament details
- Matches played: 24

The 2014 Hong Kong Women's Sevens was the 17th edition of the tournament. The competition was held on 28 March at the Hong Kong Football Club. 12 teams including hosts, Hong Kong, competed at the tournament; with Kenya making their debut as the 37th international team to take part in the event.

Canada defeated France in the final to win the tournament.

== Teams ==
- Brazil
- Canada
- China
- France
- Ireland
- Japan
- Kazakhstan
- Kenya
- Papua New Guinea
- Singapore
- South Africa
- Hong Kong

== Tournament ==
=== Pool stages ===
Pool A

Nation	Won	Drawn	Lost	For	Against
Canada	2	0	0	52	5
Kazakhstan	1	0	1	12	40
Hong Kong	0	0	2	12	31

Hong Kong	5–9	Canada

Hong Kong	7–12	Kazakhstan

Canada	33–0	Kazakhstan

Pool B

Nation	Won	Drawn	Lost	For	Against
South Africa	2	0	0	48	7
Brazil	1	0	1	26	19
Papua New Guinea	0	0	2	0	48

Brazil	19–0	Papua New Guinea

South Africa	29–0	Papua New Guinea

Brazil	7–19	South Africa

Pool C

Nation	Won	Drawn	Lost	For	Against
France	1	1	0	54	19
China	1	1	0	43	26
Kenya	0	0	2	7	59

France	35–0	Kenya

China	24–7	Kenya

France	19–19	China

Pool D

Nation	Won	Drawn	Lost	For	Against
Japan	2	0	0	58	12
Ireland	1	0	1	43	27
Singapore	0	0	2	7	67

Ireland	31–0	Singapore

Japan	36–7	Singapore

Ireland	12–27	Japan

=== Classification stages ===
Bowl Finals

Semi-finals
Hong Kong	50
Singapore	0
Kenya	12
Papua New Guinea	5

Bowl Final
Hong Kong	33
Kenya	7
11th Place
Papua New Guinea	22
Singapore	5

Plate Finals

Semi-finals
Kazakhstan	24
Ireland	14
China	19
Brazil	12

Plate Final
Kazakhstan	12
China	7
7th Place
Brazil	20
Ireland	7

Cup Finals

Semi-finals
Canada	38
Japan	0
France	19
South Africa	5

Cup Final
Canada	24
France	0
3rd Place
South Africa	28
Japan	10
