= 2016 Hong Kong Women's Sevens =

Women's tournament

- Host nation: Hong Kong
- Date: 7–8 April

Cup
- Champion: South Africa
- Runner-up: France

Plate
- Winner: China
- Runner-up: Kazakhstan

Bowl
- Winner: Kenya
- Runner-up: Sri Lanka

Tournament details
- Matches played: 29

The 2016 Hong Kong Women's Sevens was the 19th edition of the tournament. It took place between the 7th and 8th of April. South Africa won the tournament.

== Teams ==
Ten teams competed in the tournament.

- Hong Kong
- Argentina
- China
- France
- Japan
- Kazakhstan
- Kenya
- South Africa
- Sri Lanka
- Thailand

== Tournament ==
=== Pool stages ===
==== Pool A ====
Nation	Won	Drawn	Lost	For	Against
France	3	0	1	88	29
South Africa	3	0	1	53	22
Kazakhstan	2	0	2	58	41
China	2	0	2	36	56
Kenya	0	0	4	22	99

- South Africa Select 32 - 0 Kenya
- Kazakhstan 5 - 10 China
- France Development 22 - 5 Kenya
- South Africa Select 7 - 17 Kazakhstan
- France Development 39 - 7 China
- Kazakhstan 26 - 12 Kenya
- South Africa Select 7 - 0 China
- France Development 12 - 10 Kazakhstan
- China 19 - 5 Kenya
- France Development 5 - 7 South Africa Select

==== Pool B ====
Nation	Won	Drawn	Lost	For	Against
Japan	3	0	1	120	21
Hong Kong	3	0	1	90	17
Argentina	2	0	2	59	74
Thailand	2	0	2	50	70
Sri Lanka	0	0	4	17	140

- Hong Kong 45 - 0 Sri Lanka
- Argentina 19 - 12 Thailand
- Japan 41 - 0 Sri Lanka
- Hong Kong 7 - 10 Argentina
- Japan 22 - 7 Thailand
- Argentina 30 - 5 Sri Lanka
- Hong Kong 24 - 0 Thailand
- Japan 50 - 0 Argentina
- Thailand 24 - 12 Sri Lanka
- Japan 7 - 14 Hong Kong

=== Knockout stages ===
==== Bowl ====
Bowl Final
Kenya	29
Sri Lanka	0

==== Plate ====
Semi-finals
Kazakhstan	12
Thailand	5
China	28
Argentina	10

Plate Final
China	7
Kazakhstan	5
7th Place
Argentina	17
Thailand	0

==== Cup ====
Semi-finals
8 April - Hong Kong Football Club Stadium
France	5
Hong Kong	0
8 April - Hong Kong Football Club Stadium
South Africa	0
Japan	0

Cup Final
8 April - Hong Kong Stadium
South Africa	19
France	10
3rd Place
8 April - Hong Kong Football Club Stadium
Japan	10
Hong Kong	5
