= Valley RFC =

Societe Generale Valley
- Founded: 1975; 51 years ago
- Ground: Happy Valley (Capacity: 2,000)
- Chairman: Brett Stewien
- Coach(es): Mark Fatialofa; Martin Muller
- League: HKRU Premiership
Team kit

Official website
- www.valleyrfc.com

Valley RFC is a sports club based in Hong Kong with a rugby section (known as Societe Generale Valley RFC for sponsorship reasons) as well as Netball and Hockey sections. It also has a junior rugby academy called Valley Fort. The club is historically based in Happy Valley, inside the Happy Valley Racecourse, hence the inspiration for its logo, the Knight chess piece.

== History ==
Valley RFC also known as Valley was founded in 1975 by a group of ex-members of the Royal Hong Kong Police Rugby Club, some displaced individuals and schoolboys who joined forces to enter a team in the local rugby competition. The result was Valley RFC, so named because of its home in Happy Valley. Valley's men of rugby have been running out in Black and Red for the past 27 seasons and have been the most successful domestic rugby side in recent years. The 2,000-capacity Happy Valley Racecourse stadium is their rugby union home.

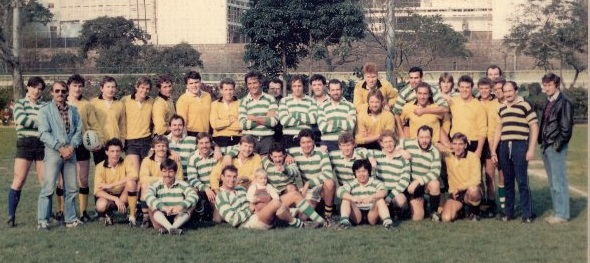
Valley RFC closeup-February 1986

=== Rugby ===
==== Men's Rugby ====
Valley is the most successful Rugby Club in Hong Kong and has won trophies at all levels of competition over the past 30 years. In recent years, the Premiership team has won back to back championships and grand finals. From 2013-2018 the premiership team had a winning streak of 6 Grand Championships in a row - still a record as of 2021 - along with 2 League victories over that time - 2015/16 and 2016/17. In 2009 Valley had an unbeaten season with wins in the league and Grand Championship! In the 2002/03 seasons Valley first team went undefeated for 16 consecutive matches taking out the League and then the Grand Championship. In the same season, the coach and captain were awarded by the HKRFU with the Coach of the Year and the Player of the Year respectively. The Top Try Scorer award also went to a Valley player, Alex Telea, with a record 25 tries. A number of Valley players represent the Hong Kong National team In recent years two Valley players have moved on to play in the Super 12 tournament in the southern hemisphere and several have moved into the National First Divisions in European teams. Keith Lowen played for Valley RFC in 1999, and went on to represent the New Zealand All Blacks in 2002. In the 2002/03 seasons, two ex-Super Rugby12 players, Matthew Dowling and Alex Telea, represented Valley at Club level, raising the levels of experience and talent throughout the club. Valley has a long-standing rivalry with the neighbour Hong Kong Football Club known as the Valley derby. Valley holds the record for most consecutive Grand Championship wins with six in a row as of March 2018.

==== Ladies' Rugby ====
Valley Ladies (The Pink Ladies) was formed in 1996 as part of the development of women's rugby in Hong Kong. Ladies rugby in Hong Kong has evolved over the years from 7's rugby, 10-a-side rugby to the first season of 15's rugby being played in 2002–2003. At the time Valley couldn't field a women's 15's side, however they did continue in the ladies 7's league. They are supported by the same coaches and levels of expertise available to the men's section. Off the field and off-season they are as active with touch and tag rugby and Dragon Boating where this year The Pink Ladies Dragon Boating squad won the plate winners narrowly beating the Hockey section Avalon Maidens.

==== Youth Rugby (Valley Fort RFC) ====
In 2002 Valley RFC re-established links with Stanley Fort RFC so that it could build a better framework to cater for more youth sides and to help provide young rugby players with a seamless path from junior to senior rugby. In 2004, to enhance the affiliation with Valley RFC, Stanley Fort changed its name to Valley Fort RFC and now plays in black and red (following the senior team strip). Valley Fort is one of the larger mini-rugby clubs in Hong Kong and has over 700 registered players in its mini and colt sections. The club runs a number of teams at all age groups from Under 5's to Under 19s.

=== Hockey ===
Comprising five Men's teams and five Ladies' teams, the hockey section is the largest section within Valley RFC with over 200 active members.

=== Netball ===
Valley RFC currently fields 10 netball teams across all divisions of the Hong Kong Netball Association. The club is one of the most successful in Hong Kong, having won over 20 league trophies in the Senior Women's Competition. Its history and achievements make Valley Netball a sought-after club, attracting more than 150 players to its annual Women’s League trials each August.

== Honours ==
- Hong Kong Men's Rugby Premiership
  - Grand Final Champions: 1990, 1994, 1996, 2000, 2001, 2003, 2006, 2007, 2009, 2011, 2013, 2014, 2015, 2016, 2017, 2018
  - League Champions: 1990, 1991, 1994, 1995, 1996, 1997, 1998, 1999, 2000, 2001, 2002, 2003, 2009, 2010, 2016, 2017

Hong Kong Women's Rugby Premiership

- Grand Final Champions: 1994, 1996, 1997, 2008, 2010, 2011, 2012, 2015, 2016, 2017, 2019, 2020
- League Champions: 2008, 2009, 2010, 2011, 2012, 2015, 2016, 2017, 2020

=== Notable former players ===
- Rambo Leung - Hong Kong international.
- Matthew Deayton - Hong Kong international.
- Sam Kynaston - Hong Kong international.
- Rodney McIntosh - Hong Kong international and New Zealand Maori
- (Tonga) Isi Tui'vai - Hong Kong and Tongan international
- Keith Lowen - New Zealand All Black
- Vaughan Going - Hong Kong international, New Zealand U20 and former Top14 and English Premiership player
- (United States) Stuart Krohn - Hong Kong international and Stade Toulousain player.
- Robin Bredbury - Hong Kong international.
- Owen Sussex - Hong Kong international
- (Australia) Mark Ashall - Hong Kong international.
- (New Zealand) Dean Herewini - Hong Kong international
- Alex Telea - Western Samoa international
- (Australia) Matthew Dowling - New South Wales Waratahs
- (New Zealand) Andrew Wongkee - Hong Kong international
- (Republic of Ireland) Terence Montgomery - Hong Kong international.
- (England) Grant Livingston - former London Scottish player.
- Salom Yiu - Hong Kong international.
- (Wales) Jack Bennett - Hong Kong international.
- (New Zealand) Kirk Munro - Hong Kong international.
- (New Zealand) Justin Temara - Hong Kong international.
- Andrew Kelly - former Edinburgh Rugby player. Scotland A. international.
- (New Zealand) Alex Baddeley - Hong Kong international.
- (France) Dave Vainqueur - former Top14 player
- Adam Rolston - Hong Kong international.
- Ed Rolston - former Leicester Tigers player and Hong Kong international.
- Max Woodward - Hong Kong international (Union and Sevens).
- (New Zealand) Ryan Meacham - Hong Kong international (Union and Sevens).
- (New Zealand) Nicholas Hewson - Hong Kong international and captain (XV's and VII's). Hong Kong's most capped XV's player.
- Harry Sayers - Hong Kong international
- Paul Altier - Hong Kong international
- Matthew Rosslee - Hong Kong international
- Tau Koloamatangi - Hong Kong international and former New Zealand U20
- Ben Higgins - Hong Kong international
- Seb Nagle-Taylor - England Sevens international
