= 2017 Women's Rugby World Cup qualifying =

2017 Rugby World Cup qualifying
Tournament details
- Dates: 2014 – 2017
- No. of nations: 20

The qualification process for the 2017 Women's Rugby World Cup began on 14 February 2015. Twelve teams qualified for the tournament, which was held in Ireland in 2017.

== Qualification process ==
Following the 2014 Women's Rugby World Cup, seven teams received an automatic qualification berth - these berths being given to the top seven teams (England, Canada, France, Ireland, New Zealand, the United States and Australia). The remaining five berths for the 2017 finals were awarded through regional tournaments.

The non-automatic qualification process began on 14 February 2015.

== Regional qualification ==
There are 12 nations participating in the 2017 Women's Rugby World Cup. Seven teams have automatically qualified by virtue of their performance at the prior Rugby World Cup, leaving five teams to qualify through regional matches. Regional Qualification began on 14 February 2015, during the second round of the 2015 Women's Six Nations Championship.

Region	Automatic qualifiers	Teams in qualifying process	Qualifying places	Qualified teams	World Cup pools
Americas	2	0	0	Canada (AQ); United States (AQ)	A B
Asia	0	2	2	Hong Kong; Japan	A C
Europe	3	9	3	England (AQ); France (AQ); Ireland (AQ); Italy; Spain; Wales	B C C B B A
Oceania	2	2	0	Australia (AQ); New Zealand (AQ)	C A
TOTAL	7	13	5	-	-

=== Europe ===
==== European Qualification ====
England, France, and Ireland automatically qualified by virtue of their finishes in the 2014 tournament. In addition, there were three other places available for European countries.

==== Round One ====
The top two teams from the combined 2015 and 2016 Women's Six Nations Championship, Italy and Wales, qualified directly. The remaining team, Scotland, proceeded to Round Three.

Position	Nation	Games				Points			Tries	Table points
Position	Nation	Played	Won	Drawn	Lost	For	Against	Diff	Tries	Table points
1	Italy	10	5	0	5	147	199	-52	-	10
2	Wales	10	4	0	6	125	148	-23	-	8
3	Scotland	10	0	0	10	56	373	-317	-	0

==== Round Two ====
The top team from the 2016 Women's European Championship proceeded to Round Three. The tournament took place in Spain in October 2016, with Spain being declared champions.

==== Round Three ====
Scotland and the winner of Round Two, Spain, played a home-and-away series to determine the final European qualifier. Spain won both games.

18 November 2016

Scotland	5–10	Spain

Scotstoun Stadium, Glasgow

26 November 2016

Spain	15–10	Scotland

Estadio Nacional Complutense, Madrid

=== Asia and Oceania ===
==== Asian Qualification ====
The top two teams of the 2016 Asia Rugby Women's Championship qualified to the Repechage. The ARWC was contested between Japan and Hong Kong, Kazakhstan withdrew from the tournament.

==== Oceania Qualification ====
New Zealand and Australia automatically qualified due to their finishes in the 2014 tournament. A third team, Fiji, defeated Papua New Guinea 37–10 in the Oceania qualifier to move on to the repechage.

5 November 2016

Fiji	37–10	Papua New Guinea

=== Repechage ===
The two best-ranked teams from a final qualifying tournament featuring one team from Oceania and two teams from Asia.

Pos	Team	Pld	W	D	L	PF	PA	PD	Pts
1	Japan	2	2	0	0	75	8	+67	9
2	Hong Kong	2	1	0	1	53	27	+26	5
3	Fiji	2	0	0	2	7	100	−93	0

9 December 2016

Hong Kong	45–7	Fiji

Hong Kong

13 December 2016

Japan	55–0	Fiji

Hong Kong

17 December 2016

Hong Kong	8–20	Japan

Hong Kong
