= Tokyo Sankyu Phoenix =

Japanese women's rugby union club, based in Tokyo

- Union: Japan Rugby Football Union
- Founded: 2002; 24 years ago
- Location: Shibuya, Tokyo
- League: All-Japan Women's Rugby Championship
- 2025: Champions
Team kit

Official website
- rc-phoenix.com

Tokyo Sankyu Phoenix is a Japanese women's rugby union team based in Shibuya, Tokyo. They compete in the All-Japan Women's Rugby Championship.

== History ==
The club was established in 2002, with the women's team being founded in 2013.

In 2023, Tokyo Sankyu Phoenix signed a partnership with Australian Super Rugby Women's side the Western Force. The agreement would allow for pre-season trial games, the sharing of knowledge, exchange of players, management, coaches, training staff and media staff, co-creation branding and academy planning.

Tokyo Sankyu Phoenix met Mie Pearls for the 2023–2024 National Women’s Rugby Championship final which was played for the first time at the Chichibunomiya Rugby Stadium. They defeated the Mie Pearls 24–40.

After being crowned national champions, they played the Western Force in a pre-season trial match on 23 February at HBF Park; they won the game 24–14.

On 2 February 2025, they successfully defended their championship title which they have won for the third consecutive year. They defeated Mie Pearls in the final to win the 11th Japan Women's Rugby Football Championship.

== Coaches ==
=== Coaching staff and Management ===
| Position | Name |
|---|---|
| Head Coach | Eikou Yoshida |
| General Manager | Ryoma Kudo |
| Team Owner / President | Yohei Shinomiya |
