= Hong Kong women's national rugby union team =

National rugby team in XV

Hong Kong
- Union: Hong Kong Rugby Union
- Head coach: Lewis Wilson
- Most caps: Lee Ka-shun (34)
First colours

World Rugby ranking
- Current: 16 (as of 22 September 2025)
- Highest: 16

First international
- Hong Kong 14–42 Japan (Kumagaya, Japan 8 April 1998)

Biggest win
- Hong Kong 81–0 Malaysia (Kuala Lumpur, Malaysia 18 December 2010)

Biggest defeat
- New Zealand 121–0 Hong Kong (Dublin, Ireland 13 August 2017)

World Cup
- Appearances: 1 (First in 2017)
- Best result: 12 (2017)

The Hong Kong women's national rugby union team represents Hong Kong in women's rugby union. They played their first international match in 1998 against Japan. They made their Rugby World Cup debut in 2017 in Ireland.

== History ==
Hong Kong made their World Cup debut at the 2017 Women's Rugby World Cup. Hong Kong competed at the 2019 Asia Pacific Championship in Fiji. They played in a round-robin competition against Fiji and Samoa. They defeated Fiji 29–10 and lost to Samoa 34–12. Samoa won the Championship after beating Fiji 15–12.

They withdrew from the 2021 Rugby World Cup qualifier that was to be held in Dubai due to travel restrictions linked to the COVID-19 pandemic.

In 2022, Hong Kong defeated Kazakhstan twice; they made a come back in the first test to win 31–17, and won the second test 14–12. They made a huge climb in rankings after jumping up four places from 18th to their current rank of 15th.

On 28 September 2024, Lee Ka-shun became Hong Kong China's most capped female player, she earned her 34th cap at the WXV 3 tournament against Fiji.

== Records ==
=== Overall ===
Women's World Rugby Rankings Top 20 rankings as of 2 November 2026
Rank	Change*	Team	Points
1	Steady	England	94.20
2	Steady	New Zealand	93.18
3	Steady	Canada	91.68
4	Steady	France	85.00
5	Steady	Ireland	78.29
6	Steady	United States	77.50
7	Steady	Australia	77.18
8	Steady	Italy	71.99
9	Steady	Scotland	71.25
10	Steady	South Africa	70.76
11	Steady	Wales	70.12
12	Steady	Fiji	66.65
13	Steady	Japan	65.00
14	Steady	Spain	63.22
15	Steady	Samoa	58.31
16	Steady	Netherlands	58.29
17	Steady	Hong Kong	55.72
18	Steady	Russia	55.10
19	Steady	Kazakhstan	53.95
20	Steady	Germany	51.12
*Change from the previous ranking update

(Full internationals only)

Rugby: Hong Kong internationals 1998-
Opponent	First game	Played	Won	Drawn	Lost	Percentage
Canada	2017	1	0	0	1	0%
China	2006	2	1	0	1	50%
Fiji	2016	2	2	0	0	100%
Japan	1998	17	1	0	16	5.88%
Kazakhstan	2009	6	2	0	4	33.33%
Kyrgyzstan	2008	1	1	0	0	100%
Malaysia	2010	1	1	0	0	100%
Netherlands	2019	3	2	0	1	66.67%
New Zealand	2017	1	0	0	1	0%
Samoa	2019	1	0	0	1	0%
Singapore	2006	12	10	1	1	83.33%
Spain	2015	4	0	0	4	0.00%
Sweden	2023	1	1	0	0	100%
Thailand	2005	1	0	0	1	0%
Uzbekistan	2008	1	0	0	1	0%
Wales	2017	2	0	0	2	0%
Summary	1998	56	21	1	34	37.50%

=== Rugby World Cup ===
Rugby World Cup
Year	Round	Position	GP	W	D	L	PF	PA
—N/a	Hong Kong was not invited to any of the Rugby World Cups between 1991–1998							
(Spain) 2002	Did Not Qualify							
(Canada) 2006	Did Not Qualify							
(England) 2010	Did Not Qualify							
(France) 2014	Did Not Qualify							
(Ireland) 2017	11th place playoff	12th	5	0	0	5	27	333
(New Zealand) 2021	Withdrew due to COVID-19 pandemic							
(England) 2025	Did Not Qualify							
(Australia) 2029	TBD							
(United States) 2033	TBD							
Total	1/9	12th^{†}	5	0	0	5	27	333
Champion Runner-up Third place Fourth place: * Tied placing ^{†} Best placing / Home venue

== Players ==
=== Recent squad ===
On 19 August 2024, Hong Kong announced their 30-player squad for the WXV 3 competition in Dubai.

Head coach: Lewis Wilson

Player	Position	Date of birth (age)	Caps	Club/province
Lau Nga-wun	Prop	30 July 1992 (aged 32)	23	(Hong Kong) Gai Wu
Tsang Hoi-Laam	Hooker	11 May 1998 (aged 26)	4	(Hong Kong) Gai Wu
Megan Richardson	Forward	23 October 1991 (aged 32)	3	
Kea Herewini	Forward	27 January 2000 (aged 24)	3	(Hong Kong) Valley RFC
Lee Ka-Shun	Prop	24 March 1989 (aged 35)	26	(Hong Kong) Gai Wu
Tanya Dhar	Hooker	20 September 2000 (aged 24)	5	(Hong Kong) Valley RFC
Yuei-Tein Fion Got	Forward	20 May 1993 (aged 31)	6	(Hong Kong) HKFC
Leung Choi-See	Forward	28 November 2000 (aged 23)		
Chloe Baltazar	Lock	13 May 2000 (aged 24)	7	(Hong Kong) USRC Tigers
Morena Grierson	Lock	28 November 1998 (aged 25)	0	(Hong Kong) Kowloon RFC
Roshini Turner	Lock	26 November 1996 (aged 27)	10	(Hong Kong) HKFC
Chow Mei-Nam	Lock	14 November 1988 (aged 35)	24	(Hong Kong) Gai Wu
Chan Tsz-Ching	Back row	14 March 1996 (aged 28)	10	(Hong Kong) HKFC
Micayla Baltazar	Back row	26 June 2003 (aged 21)	5	(Hong Kong) USRC Tigers
Pun Wai-Yan (c)	Back row	6 April 1995 (aged 29)	16	(Hong Kong) Gai Wu
Shanna Forrest	Back row	4 January 2002 (aged 22)	3	(Hong Kong) Kowloon RFC
Karen Hoi-Ting So	Back row	27 April 1990 (aged 34)	16	(Hong Kong) Valley RFC
Au King-To	Scrum-half	19 July 1996 (aged 28)	7	(Hong Kong) Gai Wu
Jessica Wai-On Ho	Scrum-half	12 May 1992 (aged 32)	18	(Hong Kong) USRC Tigers
Wan Tsz-Yau	Scrum-half	17 September 1999 (aged 25)	1	(Hong Kong) Gai Wu
Fung Hoi-Ching	Fly-half	18 April 1999 (aged 25)	6	(Hong Kong) Gai Wu
Qian Jiayu	Centre	29 March 1998 (aged 26)	7	(Hong Kong) Gai Wu
Natasha Olson-Thorne	Centre	6 October 1992 (aged 31)	30	(Hong Kong) USRC Tigers
Gabriella Rivers	Centre	16 August 2002 (aged 22)	3	(Hong Kong) HKFC
Lucia Bolton	Centre	4 June 2001 (aged 23)	0	(Hong Kong) HKFC
Chong Ka-Yan	Back	24 November 1993 (aged 30)	17	(Hong Kong) USRC Tigers
Zoe Smith	Back	15 May 1992 (aged 32)	7	(Hong Kong) Valley RFC
Sabay Lynam	Back	15 September 2003 (aged 21)	3	(Hong Kong) Kowloon RFC
Haruka Uematsu	Back	17 August 2006 (aged 18)	0	(Hong Kong) Valley RFC

=== Award winners ===
The following Hong Kong players have been recognised at the World Rugby Awards since 2001:

World Rugby Women's 15s Player of the Year
Year	Nominees	Winners
2011	Ruth Mitchell	Ruth Mitchell

=== Team management ===
Management for WXV 3.

- Programme Lead – Royce Chan
- Manager – Dora Kwok
- Coach – Andrew Douglas
- Asst Coach – Sam Beard
- Asst Coach – Lewis Wilson
- S&C Coach – lan Bonnet
- S&C Coach – Peter Nugent
- Physio – Sophie Raine
- Physio – Jonathan Mitchell Moses
- Analyst – Jake Martin
