= 2017 Women's Rugby World Cup =

Rugby union event in Ireland

Tournament details
- Host nations: Ireland
- Dates: 9 August – 26 August 2017
- No. of nations: 12

Final positions
- Champions: New Zealand (5th title)
- Runner-up: England
- Third place: France

Tournament statistics
- Matches played: 30
- Attendance: 45,412 (1,514 per match)
- Tries scored: 244 (average 8.13 per match)
- Top scorer(s): (New Zealand) Portia Woodman (65)
- Most tries: (New Zealand) Portia Woodman (13)
- Points scored: 1,549 (average 51.63 per match)

The 2017 Women's Rugby World Cup was the eighth edition of the Women's Rugby World Cup and was held in Ireland in August 2017. New Zealand became the 2017 champions by beating England 41–32 in the final on 26 August. Matches were held in Dublin and Belfast. The pool stages were held at University College Dublin with the semi-finals and finals held at Queen's University and Kingspan Stadium in Belfast.

The tournament took place three rather than four years after the previous Women's Rugby World Cup because World Rugby wanted to move away from clashing with other events. The event returned to a four-year cycle after 2017.

The 2017 tournament set attendance records for a Women's World Cup. The tournament drew 45,412 fans over 30 matches. The final was played in front of a crowd of 17,115, and the pool matches sold out.

This was the last edition of the tournament under the "Women's Rugby World Cup" name. On 21 August 2019, World Rugby announced that all future World Cups, whether for men or women, would be officially titled as the "Rugby World Cup", distinguished only by year and not by gender. As such, the 2021 edition in New Zealand bore the title of "Rugby World Cup 2021".

== Bidding process ==
On 2 March 2015, it was announced that the Irish Rugby Football Union had submitted a bid to host to Women's Rugby World Cup in August 2017. The Irish bid was the only one made to host the event. On 13 May 2015 it was announced that Ireland would host the event in Dublin and Belfast.

On 4 June 2015 it was announced that Garrett Tubridy had been appointed tournament director for the event.

== Qualifying ==
Ireland, the host nation, had already qualified automatically by finishing in the top seven teams at the 2014 tournament before being announced as hosts. A further six teams (England, Canada, France, New Zealand, the United States and Australia) qualified automatically as top seven finishers at the 2014 tournament. Italy and Wales qualified as the top two teams across the 2015 and 2016 Women's Six Nations excluding England, France, and Ireland. The remaining three qualifiers (Hong Kong, Spain and Japan) were determined by the end of 2016.

=== Qualified teams ===
Americas	Europe	Oceania	Asia
Canada (AQ); United States (AQ)	England (Holders); France (AQ); Ireland (Hosts); Italy (AQ); Spain (WCQ); Wales (AQ)	Australia (AQ); New Zealand (AQ)	Hong Kong (WCQ); Japan (WCQ)

== Match officials ==
In March 2017, World Rugby announced the 9 referees and 5 assistant referees for the tournament.

In August 2017, it was announced that Irish referee Joy Neville would adjudicate the final.

Referees (9)

- (Hong Kong) Tim Baker
- (South Africa) Aimee Barrett-Theron
- (Australia) Graham Cooper
- (England) Sara Cox
- (Ireland) Sean Gallagher
- (England) Claire Hodnett
- (Ireland) Joy Neville
- (Spain) Alhambra Nievas
- (Australia) Amy Perrett

Assistants (5)

- (Italy) Beatrice Benvenuti
- (Canada) Rose Labreche
- (France) Marie Lematte
- (Ireland) Helen O'Reilly
- (England) Ian Tempest

== Pool stage ==
The pool draw took place on 9 November 2016 at Belfast.

Each pool was a single round-robin of six games, in which each team played one match against each of the other teams in the same pool. Teams were awarded four points for a win, two points for a draw, one point for a loss by one to seven points, and none for a defeat by more than seven points. A team scoring four or more tries in one match scored a bonus point.

The tournament comprised 12 teams in three pools of four with the pool winners plus the best runner-up progressing to the semi-finals.

All times are local, Western European Summer Time (UTC+1).

=== Pool A ===
Team	Pld	W	D	L	TF	PF	PA	+/−	BP	Pts
New Zealand	3	3	0	0	35	213	17	+196	3	15
Canada	3	2	0	1	19	118	48	+70	1	9
Wales	3	1	0	2	9	51	74	−23	1	5
Hong Kong	3	0	0	3	2	15	258	−243	0	0

9 August 2017

New Zealand	44–12	Wales
	Report

Billings Park UCD, Dublin

9 August 2017

Canada	98–0	Hong Kong
	Report

Billings Park UCD, Dublin

13 August 2017

New Zealand	121–0	Hong Kong
	Report

Billings Park UCD, Dublin

13 August 2017

Canada	15–0	Wales
	Report

Billings Park UCD, Dublin

17 August 2017

Canada	5–48	New Zealand
	Report

Billings Park UCD, Dublin

17 August 2017

Wales	39–15	Hong Kong
	Report

UCD Bowl, Dublin

=== Pool B ===
Team	Pld	W	D	L	TF	PF	PA	+/−	BP	Pts
England	3	3	0	0	27	159	44	+115	3	15
United States	3	2	0	1	15	93	59	+34	3	11
Spain	3	1	0	2	4	27	107	−80	0	4
Italy	3	0	0	3	5	33	102	−69	0	0

9 August 2017

England	56–5	Spain
	Report

UCD Bowl, Dublin

9 August 2017

United States	24–12	Italy
	Report

UCD Bowl, Dublin

13 August 2017

England	56–13	Italy
	Report

Billings Park UCD, Dublin

13 August 2017

United States	43–0	Spain
	Report

UCD Bowl, Dublin

17 August 2017

England	47–26	United States
	Report

Billings Park UCD, Dublin

17 August 2017

Italy	8–22	Spain
	Report

UCD Bowl, Dublin

=== Pool C ===
Team	Pld	W	D	L	TF	PF	PA	+/−	BP	Pts
France	3	3	0	0	23	141	19	+122	2	14
Ireland	3	2	0	1	7	48	52	−4	0	8
Australia	3	1	0	2	8	46	82	−36	2	6
Japan	3	0	0	3	7	43	125	−82	0	0

9 August 2017

Ireland	19–17	Australia
	Report

UCD Bowl, Dublin

9 August 2017

France	72–14	Japan
	Report

Billings Park UCD, Dublin

13 August 2017

Ireland	24–14	Japan
	Report

UCD Bowl, Dublin

13 August 2017

France	48–0	Australia
	Report

UCD Bowl, Dublin

17 August 2017

Australia	29–15	Japan
	Report

Billings Park UCD, Dublin

17 August 2017

France	21–5	Ireland
	Report

UCD Bowl, Dublin

== Finals ==
=== Knockout Rankings ===
At the completion of the pool stage, teams were ranked first according to their position within their pool (positions 1 to 3 were the pool winners, positions 4 to 6 were the pool runners up, etc.) and then by competition points. The top four teams progressed to the tournament semi-finals, teams ranked 5–8 progressed to the 5th to 8th play-offs, and the teams ranked 9–12 progressed to the 9th to 12th play-offs.

Qualified for semi-finals
Qualified for 5th to 8th playoffs
Qualified for 9th to 12th playoffs

Rank	Team	Pos	Pld	W	D	L	PF	PA	+/−	BP	Pts
1	New Zealand	A1	3	3	0	0	213	17	+196	3	15
2	England	B1	3	3	0	0	159	44	+115	3	15
3	France	C1	3	3	0	0	141	19	+122	2	14
4	United States	B2	3	2	0	1	93	59	+34	3	11
5	Canada	A2	3	2	0	1	118	48	+70	1	9
6	Ireland	C2	3	2	0	1	48	52	−4	0	8
7	Australia	C3	3	1	0	2	46	82	−36	2	6
8	Wales	A3	3	1	0	2	51	74	−23	1	5
9	Spain	B3	3	1	0	2	27	107	−80	0	4
10	Italy	B4	3	0	0	3	33	102	−69	0	0
11	Japan	C4	3	0	0	3	43	125	−82	0	0
12	Hong Kong	A4	3	0	0	3	15	258	−243	0	0

=== Tie breakers ===
If teams were tied on pool points they were ranked by rules applied in the following order –
1. The team that won the match between the two teams was ranked first (does not apply to teams in different pools)
2. If the teams were still level, the difference between points scored and points conceded was used to rank the teams
3. Difference between tries scored and tries conceded was used to rank the teams
4. Most points scored
5. Most tries scored
6. Coin toss

=== Play-offs: 9th to 12th ===
Semi-finals
22 August 2017
Italy	22
Japan	0
22 August 2017
Spain	31
Hong Kong	7

Final
26 August 2017
Italy	20
Spain	15
Third place
26 August 2017
Japan	44
Hong Kong	5

Ninth to twelfth semifinals

22 August 2017
12:00

Italy	22–0	Japan
	Report

Queen's University Belfast

22 August 2017
14:30

Spain	31–7	Hong Kong
	Report

Queen's University Belfast

Eleventh place playoff

26 August 2017
12:00

Japan	44–5	Hong Kong
	Report

Queen's University Belfast

Ninth place playoff

26 August 2017
14:30

Italy	20–15	Spain
	Report

Queen's University Belfast

=== Play-offs 5th to 8th ===
Semi-finals
22 August 2017
Ireland	24
Australia	36
22 August 2017
Canada	52
Wales	0

Final
26 August 2017
Australia	12
Canada	43
Third place
26 August 2017
Ireland	17
Wales	27

Fifth to eighth semifinals

22 August 2017
14:00

Ireland	24–36	Australia
	Report

Kingspan Stadium, Belfast

22 August 2017
17:00

Canada	52–0	Wales
	Report

Queen's University Belfast

Seventh place playoff

26 August 2017
14:00

Ireland	17–27	Wales
	Report

Kingspan Stadium, Belfast

Fifth place playoff

26 August 2017
14:30

Australia	12–43	Canada
	Report

Queen's University Belfast

=== Finals ===
The team ranked first after the pool stages played the team ranked fourth and the team ranked second played the team ranked third.

Semi-finals
22 August 2017
New Zealand	45
United States	12
22 August 2017
England	20
France	3

Final
26 August 2017
New Zealand	41
England	32
Third place
26 August 2017
France	31
United States	23

==== Semifinals ====
Test: 1238	22 August 2017	New Zealand	45–12	United States	Kingspan Stadium, Belfast
	16:00 GMT (UTC+00)		Report

Test: 1239	22 August 2017	England	20–3	France	Kingspan Stadium, Belfast
	18:45 GMT (UTC+00)		Report

==== Third place playoff ====
Test: 1244	26 August 2017	France	31–23	United States	Kingspan Stadium, Belfast
	16:00 GMT (UTC+00)		Report

==== Final ====
Test: 1245	26 August 2017	England	32–41	New Zealand	Kingspan Stadium, Belfast
	18:45 GMT (UTC+00)	Try: Penalty Try 25'; Thompson 32', 55'; Noel-Smith 77'; Con: Scarratt 33', 78'; Pen: Scarratt 15', 51'	Report	Try: Winiata 8', 69'; Natua 39', 45', 58'; Smith 53'; Cocksedge 63'; Con: Cocksedge 46', 54', 58'	Attendance: 17,115; Referee: Joy Neville

== Statistics ==
=== Points scorers ===
Pos	Name	Team	T	C	P	DG	Pts
1	Portia Woodman	New Zealand	13	0	0	0	65
2	Kendra Cocksedge	New Zealand	2	23	2	0	62
3	Emily Scarratt	England	4	12	4	0	56
4	Magali Harvey	Canada	6	9	1	0	51
N/A	Penalty Try	N/A	5	5	0	0	35
5	Selica Winiata	New Zealand	6	0	0	0	30
5	Elissa Alarie	Canada	6	0	0	0	30
7	Alev Kelter	United States	1	6	3	0	26
8	Michela Sillari	Italy	5	0	0	0	25
8	Lydia Thompson	England	5	0	0	0	25
10	Mayu Shimizu	Japan	3	4	0	0	23

=== Try scorers ===
Pos	Name	Team	Tries
1	Portia Woodman	New Zealand	14
2	Selica Winiata	New Zealand	6
2	Elissa Alarie	Canada	6
2	Magali Harvey	Canada	6
5	Lydia Thompson	England	5
5	Penalty Try	N/A	5
6	Emily Scarratt	England	4
6	Kay Wilson	England	4
6	Kelly Russell	Canada	4
6	Kris Thomas	United States	4
6	Paula Fitzpatrick	Ireland	4

== Final classification ==
	Nation
Gold medal	New Zealand
Silver medal	England
Bronze medal	France
4	United States
5	Canada
6	Australia
7	Wales
8	Ireland
9	Italy
10	Spain
11	Japan
12	Hong Kong

== Broadcasting ==
- Australia: Foxtel
- Canada: TSN and RDS
- France: Eurosport and France Télévisions
- Ireland: Eir Sport and RTÉ
- Spain: RTVE
- United Kingdom: ITV
- USA: NBC Sports

== Sources ==
- Rugby World Cup Women’s Stats Archive
- Women's Rugby Data

== See also ==
- Rugby World Cup
- Rugby World Cup Sevens
