= List of Hong Kong women's national rugby union team matches =

The following is a list of Hong Kong women's national rugby union team international matches.

== Overall ==
Hong Kong's overall international match record against all nations, updated to 25 May 2025, is as follows:

	Played	Won	Drawn	Lost	Win %
Total	63	24	1	38	38.1%

== Full internationals ==
=== Legend ===
Won	Lost	Draw

=== 1998 ===
Test	Date	Opponent	PF	PA	Venue	Event
1	8 April 1998	Japan	14	42	Kumagaya Rugby Stadium, Kumagaya	
2	12 April 1998	Japan	0	39	Kumagaya Rugby Stadium, Kumagaya	

=== 2000s ===
Test	Date	Opponent	PF	PA	Venue	Event
3	15 December 2000	Japan	0	62	Aberdeen Sports Ground, Aberdeen	2002 World Cup Q
4	3 June 2005	Japan	0	78	Bangkok	2006 World Cup Q
5	5 June 2005	Thailand	18	20	Bangkok	2006 World Cup Q
6	17 November 2006	Singapore	12	0	Kunming	2006 Asia Championship
7	19 November 2006	China	7	31	Kunming	2006 Asia Championship
8	3 June 2008	Uzbekistan	6	8	Taldykorgan	2008 Asia Championship
9	7 June 2008	Kyrgyzstan	49	0	Taldykorgan	2008 Asia Championship
10	4 December 2008	Singapore	10	10	Saint Andrew's School, Singapore	
11	5 December 2008	Singapore	5	0	Yio Chu Kang Stadium, Ang Mo Kio	
12	10 October 2009	Singapore	22	17	Hong Kong	
13	4 November 2009	Kazakhstan	14	58	Republic Polytechnic, Singapore	2010 World Cup Q
14	6 November 2009	Singapore	16	3	Padang, Singapore	2010 World Cup Q

=== 2010s ===
Test	Date	Opponent	PF	PA	Venue	Event
15	22 May 2010	Japan	0	17	Chichibunomiya Rugby Stadium, Tokyo	
16	18 December 2010	Malaysia	81	0	Royal Selangor Club, Kuala Lumpur	
17	29 April 2011	Japan	0	15	Hong Kong	
18	21 May 2011	Singapore	53	8	Hong Kong	
19	19 May 2012	Japan	15	61	Chichibunomiya Rugby Stadium, Tokyo	
20	5 July 2012	Japan	17	41	Kunshan	2012 Asia Four Nations
21	7 July 2012	China	27	3	Kunshan	2012 Asia Four Nations
22	12 December 2012	Singapore	45	21	Yio Chu Kang Stadium	
23	15 December 2012	Singapore	44	17	Yio Chu Kang Stadium	
24	27 April 2013	Singapore	29	0	Hong Kong	
25	4 September 2013	Japan	0	82	Almaty Central Stadium, Almaty	2013 Asia Four Nations
26	7 September 2013	Singapore	15	17	Almaty Central Stadium, Almaty	2013 Asia Four Nations
27	18 May 2014	Kazakhstan	10	13	Aberdeen Sports Ground, Aberdeen	2014 Asia Four Nations
28	21 May 2014	Japan	15	14	Aberdeen Sports Ground, Aberdeen	2014 Asia Four Nations
29	24 May 2014	Singapore	53	5	Aberdeen Sports Ground, Aberdeen	2014 Asia Four Nations
30	25 April 2015	Kazakhstan	0	40	Almaty Central Stadium, Almaty	2015 Asia Championship
31	23 May 2015	Japan	12	27	Aberdeen Sports Ground, Aberdeen	2015 Asia Championship
32	19 December 2015	Spain	0	57	Majadahonda	
33	7 May 2016	Japan	3	39	HKFC Stadium, Happy Valley	2016 Asia Championship
34	14 May 2016	Singapore	40	7	Singapore	2016 Asia Championship
35	28 May 2016	Japan	3	30	Chichibunomiya Rugby Stadium, Tokyo	2016 Asia Championship
36	9 December 2016	Fiji	45	7	Hong Kong	2016 Asia Pacific Championship
37	17 December 2016	Japan	8	20	Hong Kong	2016 Asia Pacific Championship
38	3 June 2017	Spain	18	41	Medina del Campo	
39	8 July 2017	Japan	0	58	Shiroyama	2017 Asia Championship
40	15 July 2017	Japan	19	60	Hong Kong	2017 Asia Championship
41	9 August 2017	Canada	0	98	Billings Park UCD, Dublin	2017 World Cup
42	13 August 2017	New Zealand	0	121	Billings Park UCD, Dublin	2017 World Cup
43	17 August 2017	Wales	15	39	UCD Bowl, Dublin	2017 World Cup
44	22 August 2017	Spain	7	31	Queen's University Belfast, Belfast	2017 World Cup
45	26 August 2017	Japan	5	44	Queen's University Belfast, Belfast	2017 World Cup
46	11 November 2018	Spain	5	60	Villajoyosa	
47	16 November 2018	Wales	0	65	Cardiff Arms Park, Cardiff	
48	24 May 2019	Fiji	29	10	Churchill Park, Lautoka	2019 Asia Pacific Championship
49	28 May 2019	Samoa	12	34	Churchill Park, Lautoka	2019 Asia Pacific Championship
50	26 November 2019	Netherlands	14	12	Amsterdam	
51	30 November 2019	Netherlands	18	0	Amsterdam	

=== 2020s ===
Test	Date	Opponent	PF	PA	Venue	Event
52	10 December 2022	Kazakhstan	31	17	King's Park, Kowloon	2022 Asia Championship
53	17 December 2022	Kazakhstan	14	12	Hong Kong Jockey Club	2022 Asia Championship
54	1 May 2023	Sweden	22	17	NRCA Stadium, Amsterdam	
55	6 May 2023	Netherlands	17	19	NRCA Stadium, Amsterdam	
56	22 May 2023	Kazakhstan	23	27	Almaty Sports Training Complex, Almaty	2023 Asia Championship
57	22 May 2024	Japan	12	29	Hong Kong	2024 Asia Championship
58	1 June 2024	Kazakhstan	22	0	Hong Kong	2024 Asia Championship
59	28 September 2024	Fiji	3	38	The Sevens Stadium, Dubai	2024 WXV 3
60	4 October 2024	Madagascar	38	7	The Sevens Stadium, Dubai	2024 WXV 3
61	12 October 2024	Netherlands	3	33	The Sevens Stadium, Dubai	2024 WXV 3
62	20 May 2025	Kazakhstan	29	12	Fukuoka, Japan	2025 ARC
63	25 May 2025	Japan	5	63	Fukuoka, Japan	2025 ARC

== Other matches ==
Date	Hong Kong	Score	Opponent	Venue
1 December 2007	Hong Kong	2–5	(South Korea) Korea University XV	Seoul
2 December 2007	Hong Kong	61–0	(South Korea) Korea University XV	Seoul
15 December 2015	Hong Kong XV	12–59	Spain XV	Hortaleza, Spain
16 November 2016	Hong Kong XV	25–22	Kazakhstan XV	King's Park, Hong Kong
20 November 2016	Hong Kong XV	37–10	Kazakhstan XV	King's Park, Hong Kong
30 May 2017	Hong Kong XV	8–19	Spain XV	Estadio Pepe Rojo, Valladolid
