= List of Japan women's national rugby union team matches =

The following is a list of Japan women's national rugby union team international matches.

== Overall ==
Japan's overall international match record against all nations, updated to 7 September 2025, is as follows:

	Games Played	Won	Drawn	Lost	Percentage of wins
Total	95	49	2	44	51.58%

== Full internationals ==
=== Legend ===
Won	Lost	Draw

=== 1990s ===
Test	Date	Opponent	PF	PA	Venue	Tournament
1	6 April 1991	France	0	62	Aberavon	1991 RWC
2	10 April 1991	Sweden	0	20	Llanharan	1991 RWC
3	11 April 1991	Spain	0	30	Cardiff	1991 RWC
4	13 April 1994	Sweden	10	5	Melrose	1994 RWC
5	15 April 1994	United States	0	121	Melrose	1994 RWC
6	17 April 1994	France	0	99	Edinburgh Academicals RFC	1994 RWC
7	20 April 1994	Canada	0	57	Melrose	1994 RWC
8	23 April 1994	Ireland	3	11	Boroughmuir	1994 RWC
9	8 April 1998	Hong Kong	42	12	Kumagaya Rugby Stadium	
10	12 April 1998	Hong Kong	39	0	Kumagaya Rugby Stadium	

=== 2000s ===
Test	Date	Opponent	PF	PA	Venue	Tournament
11	1 September 2000	Samoa	12	10	Apia Park	
12	15 December 2000	Hong Kong	62	0	Aberdeen Park, Hong Kong	2002 RWCQ
13	13 May 2002	Spain	0	62	Barcelona	2002 RWC
14	17 May 2002	Italy	3	30	Barcelona	2002 RWC
15	20 May 2002	Netherlands	37	3	Barcelona	2002 RWC
16	24 May 2002	Ireland	18	0	Barcelona	2002 RWC
17	6 November 2004	Netherlands	7	15	Amsterdam	
18	14 November 2004	Ireland	0	55	Donnybrook	
19	3 June 2005	Hong Kong	78	0	Bangkok	2006 RWCQ
20	5 June 2005	Kazakhstan	3	19	Bangkok	2006 RWCQ
21	2 November 2007	Kazakhstan	6	10	Kunming	2007 ARFU Championship
22	4 November 2007	Singapore	20	7	Kunming	2007 ARFU Championship
23	5 June 2008	Singapore	17	10	Taldykorgan, Kazakhstan	2008 ARFU Championship
24	7 June 2008	Kazakhstan	3	39	Taldykorgan, Kazakhstan	2008 ARFU Championship
25	4 November 2009	Singapore	35	11	Republic Polytechnic, Singapore	2010 RWCQ
26	6 November 2009	Kazakhstan	5	43	Padang, Singapore	2010 RWCQ

=== 2010s ===
Test	Date	Opponent	PF	PA	Venue	Tournament
27	22 May 2010	Hong Kong	17	0	Prince Chichibu Memorial Stadium, Tokyo	2010 ARFU
28	29 April 2011	Hong Kong	15	0	Hong Kong	
29	19 May 2012	Hong Kong	61	15	Chichibunomiya Rugby Stadium, Tokyo	
30	5 July 2012	Hong Kong	41	17	Kunshan, China	2012 ARFU 4N
31	7 July 2012	Kazakhstan	8	17	Kunshan, China	2012 ARFU 4N
32	4 September 2013	Hong Kong	82	0	Almaty Central Stadium, Kazakhstan	2013 ARFU 4N
33	7 September 2013	Kazakhstan	23	25	Almaty Central Stadium, Kazakhstan	2013 ARFU 4N
34	18 May 2014	Singapore	37	5	Aberdeen Sports Ground, Hong Kong	2014 ARFU 4N
35	21 May 2014	Hong Kong	14	15	Aberdeen Sports Ground, Hong Kong	2014 ARFU 4N
36	24 May 2014	Kazakhstan	17	49	Aberdeen Sports Ground, Hong Kong	2014 ARFU 4N
37	9 May 2015	Kazakhstan	27	12	Level-5 Stadium, Fukuoka	2015 ARC
38	23 May 2015	Hong Kong	27	12	Aberdeen Sports Ground, Hong Kong	2015 ARC
39	7 May 2016	Hong Kong	39	3	Hong Kong Football Club Stadium	2016 ARC
40	28 May 2016	Hong Kong	30	3	Chichibunomiya Rugby Stadium	2016 ARC
41	13 December 2016	Fiji	55	0	Hong Kong	2017 RWCQ
42	17 December 2016	Hong Kong	20	8	Hong Kong	2017 RWCQ
43	11 June 2017	Wales	52	10	Ystrad Mynach	
44	8 July 2017	Hong Kong	58	0	Shiroyama	2017 ARC
45	15 July 2017	Hong Kong	60	19	Hong Kong	2017 ARC
46	9 August 2017	France	14	72	Billings Park UCD, Dublin	2017 RWC
47	13 August 2017	Ireland	14	24	UCD Bowl, Dublin	2017 RWC
48	17 August 2017	Australia	15	29	Billings Park UCD, Dublin	2017 RWC
49	22 August 2017	Italy	0	22	Queen's University Belfast	2017 RWC
50	26 August 2017	Hong Kong	44	5	Queen's University Belfast	2017 RWC
51	13 July 2019	Australia	5	34	Sportsground 2, Newcastle	Australian Tour
52	19 July 2019	Australia	3	46	North Sydney Oval, Sydney	Australian Tour
53	16 November 2019	Italy	17	17	Stadio Fattori, L'Aquila	
54	24 November 2019	Scotland	24	20	Scotstoun	

=== 2021–22 ===
Test	Date	Opponent	PF	PA	Venue	Tournament
55	8 November 2021	Wales	5	23	Cardiff Arms Park	
56	15 November 2021	Scotland	12	36	Edinburgh Rugby Stadium	
57	21 November 2021	Ireland	12	15	RDS Arena, Dublin	
58	1 May 2022	Fiji	28	14	Bond University, Gold Coast	Australian Tour
59	10 May 2022	Australia	12	10	Bond University, Gold Coast	Australian Tour
60	24 July 2022	South Africa	15	6	Kamaishi Recovery Memorial Stadium	
61	30 July 2022	South Africa	10	20	Kumagaya Rugby Stadium, Saitama	
62	20 August 2022	Ireland	22	57	Shizuoka Stadium, Ecopa	
63	27 August 2022	Ireland	29	10	Chichibunomiya Rugby Stadium, Tokyo	
64	24 September 2022	New Zealand	12	95	Eden Park, Auckland	
65	9 October 2022	Canada	5	41	Northland Events Centre, Whangārei	2021 RWC
66	15 October 2022	United States	17	30	Northland Events Centre, Whangārei	2021 RWC
67	23 October 2022	Italy	8	21	Waitakere Stadium, Auckland	2021 RWC

=== 2023 ===
Test	Date	Opponent	PF	PA	Venue	Tournament
68	28 May 2023	Kazakhstan	72	0	Almaty Sports Training Complex, Almaty	2023 ARC
69	9 July 2023	Spain	44	12	Campo de Rugby Las Terrazas	
70	15 July 2023	Spain	27	19	Estadio Pedro Escartín	
71	10 September 2023	Fiji	29	24	Japan Base, Fukuoka	
72	16 September 2023	Fiji	41	36	Chichibunomiya Rugby Stadium, Tokyo	
73	30 September 2023	Italy	25	24	Stadio Sergio Lanfranchi, Parma	
74	13 October 2023	Italy	15	28	Danie Craven Stadium, Stellenbosch	2023 WXV 2
75	21 October 2023	Samoa	32	10	Athlone Stadium, Cape Town	2023 WXV 2
76	27 October 2023	Scotland	7	38	Athlone Stadium, Cape Town	2023 WXV 2

=== 2024 ===
Test	Date	Opponent	PF	PA	Venue	Tournament
77	22 May 2024	Hong Kong	29	12	Hong Kong	2024 ARC
78	27 May 2024	Kazakhstan	64	0	Hong Kong	2024 ARC
79	14 June 2024	Fiji	24	15	HFC Bank Stadium, Suva	
80	20 June 2024	Fiji	15	24	Churchill Park, Lautoka	
81	11 August 2024	United States	17	17	Mikuni World Stadium, Kitakyushu	
82	17 August 2024	United States	8	11	Shizuoka Stadium ECOPA, Fukuroi	
83	14 September 2024	Italy	8	24	Stadio Walter Beltrametti, Piacenza	
84	27 September 2024	South Africa	21	34	DHL Stadium, Cape Town	2024 WXV 2
85	5 October 2024	Scotland	13	19	Athlone Stadium, Cape Town	2024 WXV 2
86	11 October 2024	Wales	10	19	Athlone Stadium, Cape Town	2024 WXV 2

=== 2025 ===
Test	Date	Opponent	PF	PA	Venue	Tournament	Ref
87	26 April 2025	United States	39	33	Wallis Annenberg Stadium, Los Angeles	Test	
88	15 May 2025	Kazakhstan	90	0	Fukuoka, Japan	2025 ARC	
89	25 May 2025	Hong Kong	63	5	Fukuoka, Japan	2025 ARC	
90	19 July 2025	Spain	32	19	Mikuni World Stadium, Kitakyushu	2025 World Cup Warm-Ups	
91	26 July 2025	Spain	30	19	Chichibunomiya Rugby Ground, Tokyo	2025 World Cup Warm-Ups	
92	9 August 2025	Italy	15	33	Stadio San Michele, Calvisano	2025 World Cup Warm-Ups	
93	24 August 2025	Ireland	14	42	Franklin's Gardens, Northampton	2025 World Cup	
94	31 August 2025	New Zealand	19	62	Sandy Park, Exeter	2025 World Cup	
95	7 September 2025	Spain	29	21	York Community Stadium, York	2025 World Cup	

== Other matches ==
Date	Japan	Score	Opponents	Venue	Note
23 September 2009	Japan	24–25	Burnaby Lake WRFC	Burnaby Lake	
26 September 2009	Japan	0–38	British Columbia	Brockton Oval, Vancouver	
2 September 2010	Japan	5–27	(England) Richmond	Old Deer Park	
4 September 2010	Japan	34–10	(England) Saracens	Bramley Road, Southgate	
6 May 2022	Japan	24–10	Australian Barbarians	Wests Bulldogs Rugby Memorial Park	Australian Tour
