= List of Kazakhstan women's national rugby union team matches =

The following is a list of Kazakhstan women's national rugby union team international matches.

== Overall ==
Kazakhstan's overall international match record against all nations, updated to 20 May 2025, is as follows:

	Played	Won	Drawn	Lost	Win percentage
Total	81	39	0	42	48.15%

== Full internationals ==
=== Legend ===
Won	Lost	Draw

=== 1990s ===
Test	Date	PF	PA	Opponent	Venue	Note
1	31 October 1993	10	11	Germany	Hanover	
2	13 April 1994	8	29	Wales	Edinburgh Academicals RFC	1994 RWC
3	15 April 1994	0	28	Canada	Edinburgh Academicals RFC	1994 RWC
4	19 April 1994	25	0	Russia	Gala	1994 RWC
5	21 April 1994	31	12	Sweden	Stirling County	1994 RWC
6	23 April 1994	29	12	Sweden	Boroughmuir	1994 RWC
7	28 November 1994	15	3	Germany	Hanover	
8	24 August 1996	53	3	Germany	Hanover	
9	1997	5	7	Russia	Unknown	
10	1997	0	15	Russia	Unknown	
11	1997	12	35	Russia	Unknown	
12	2 May 1998	6	23	France	Amsterdam	1998 RWC
13	5 May 1998	12	6	Ireland	Amsterdam	1998 RWC
14	9 May 1998	47	5	Sweden	Amsterdam	1998 RWC
15	12 May 1998	18	13	Wales	Amsterdam	1998 RWC
16	15 May 1998	26	10	Ireland	Amsterdam	1998 RWC
17	11 April 1999	34	6	Germany	Hanover	
18	19 April 1999	0	28	France	Belluno, Italy	1999 FIRA
19	21 April 1999	24	0	Netherlands	Belluno, Italy	1999 FIRA
20	24 April 1999	18	13	Wales	Belluno, Italy	1999 FIRA

=== 2000s ===
Test #	Date	PF	PA	Opponent	Venue	Note
21	8 May 2000	3	41	England	Vera, Spain	2000 FIRA
22	10 May 2000	31	15	Ireland	Vera, Spain	2000 FIRA
23	13 May 2000	3	6	Wales	Vera, Spain	2000 FIRA
24	6 May 2001	15	29	England	Tourcoing, France	2001 FIRA
25	10 May 2001	20	0	Italy	Lille, France	2001 FIRA
26	12 May 2001	7	17	Wales	Lille, France	2001 FIRA
27	13 May 2002	12	31	France	Barcelona	2002 RWC
28	17 May 2002	37	10	Netherlands	Barcelona	2002 RWC
29	20 May 2002	3	9	Samoa	Barcelona	2002 RWC
30	24 May 2002	20	3	Italy	Barcelona	2002 RWC
31	3 June 2005	67	0	Thailand	Bangkok	RWC Qualifier
32	5 June 2005	19	3	Japan	Bangkok	RWC Qualifier
33	31 August 2006	0	20	Samoa	Ellerslie Rugby Park, Edmonton	2006 RWC
34	4 September 2006	17	32	Scotland	St. Albert Rugby Park, St. Albert	2006 RWC
35	8 September 2006	5	45	Canada	Ellerslie Rugby Park, Edmonton	2006 RWC
36	12 September 2006	12	17	Spain	Ellerslie Rugby Park, Edmonton	2006 RWC
37	16 September 2006	36	0	South Africa	Ellerslie Rugby Park, Edmonton	2006 RWC
38	2 November 2007	10	6	Japan	Kunming	2007 ARFU
39	4 November 2007	34	5	China	Kunming	2007 ARFU
40	5 June 2008	64	3	Uzbekistan	Taldykorgan, Kazakhstan	2008 ARFU
41	7 June 2008	39	3	Japan	Taldykorgan, Kazakhstan	2008 ARFU
42	4 November 2009	58	14	Hong Kong	Republic Polytechnic, Singapore	RWC Qualifier
43	6 November 2009	43	5	Japan	Padang, Singapore	RWC Qualifier

=== 2010s ===
Test #	Date	PF	PA	Opponent	Venue	Note
44	8 April 2010	17	22	South Africa	Al Ain, Dubai	
45	10 April 2010	0	38	South Africa	Al Ain, Dubai	
46	20 August 2010	0	51	United States	Surrey Sports Park, Guildford	2010 RWC
47	24 August 2010	0	82	England	Surrey Sports Park, Guildford	2010 RWC
48	28 August 2010	3	37	Ireland	Surrey Sports Park, Guildford	2010 RWC
49	1 September 2010	10	25	South Africa	Surrey Sports Park, Guildford	2010 RWC
50	5 September 2010	8	12	Sweden	Surrey Sports Park, Guildford	2010 RWC
51	14 May 2011	58	3	Uzbekistan	Kazakh National University	
52	5 July 2012	51	0	China	Kunshan, China	2012 AWFN
53	7 July 2012	17	8	Japan	Kunshan, China	2012 AWFN
54	4 September 2013	91	7	Singapore	Almaty Central Stadium, Kazakhstan	2013 AWFN
55	7 September 2013	25	23	Japan	Almaty Central Stadium, Kazakhstan	2013 AWFN
56	18 May 2014	13	10	Hong Kong	Aberdeen Stadium, Hong Kong	2014 AWFN
57	21 May 2014	68	0	Singapore	Aberdeen Stadium, Hong Kong	2014 AWFN
58	24 May 2014	49	17	Japan	Aberdeen Stadium, Hong Kong	2014 AWFN
59	1 August 2014	5	79	New Zealand	CNR, Marcoussis Pitch 2	2014 RWC
60	5 August 2014	7	47	United States	CNR, Marcoussis Pitch 2	2014 RWC
61	9 August 2014	5	40	Ireland	CNR, Marcoussis Pitch 2	2014 RWC
62	13 August 2014	5	18	Spain	CNR, Marcoussis Pitch 1	2014 RWC
63	17 August 2014	0	31	Samoa	CNR, Marcoussis Pitch 1	2014 RWC
64	25 April 2015	40	0	Hong Kong	Almaty Central Stadium, Kazakhstan	2015 ARWC
65	9 May 2015	12	27	Japan	Level-5 Stadium, Fukuoka	2015 ARWC
66	31 July 2019	8	13	China	Jiujiang Stadium	
67	3 August 2019	15	0	China	Jiujiang Stadium	

=== 2020s ===
Test #	Date	PF	PA	Opponent	Venue	Note
68	19 February 2022	10	18	Colombia	The Sevens Stadium, Dubai	(Note: Kazakhstan lost to Colombia in the 2021 Rugby World Cup Final Qualification Tournament.)
69	10 December 2022	17	31	Hong Kong	King's Park Sports Ground, Hong Kong	
70	17 December 2022	12	14	Hong Kong	Hong Kong Jockey Club	
71	23 May 2023	27	23	Hong Kong	Almaty Sports Training Complex, Almaty	2023 ARWC
72	28 May 2023	0	72	Japan	Almaty Sports Training Complex, Almaty	2023 ARWC
73	13 October 2023	0	109	Ireland	The Sevens Stadium, Dubai	2023 WXV 3
74	20 October 2023	18	12	Kenya	The Sevens Stadium, Dubai	2023 WXV 3
75	27 October 2023	0	118	Fiji	The Sevens Stadium, Dubai	2023 WXV 3
76	27 May 2024	0	64	Japan	Hong Kong	2024 ARWC
77	1 June 2024	0	22	Hong Kong	Hong Kong	2024 ARWC
78	18 April 2025	47	5	Georgia	Aia Arena, Kutaisi, Georgia	
79	24 April 2025	32	0	Georgia	Kutaisi, Georgia	
80	15 May 2025	0	90	Japan	Fukuoka, Japan	2025 ARC
81	20 May 2025	12	29	Hong Kong	Fukuoka, Japan	2025 ARC

== Other matches ==
Date	Kazakhstan	Score	Opponent	Venue	Note	Ref
17 April 1994	Kazakhstan	27–0	(Scotland) Scottish Students	Kirkcaldy	1994 RWC	
16 November 2016	Kazakhstan XV	22–25	Hong Kong XV	King's Park, Hong Kong		
20 November 2016	Kazakhstan XV	10–37	Hong Kong XV	King's Park, Hong Kong		
