= Fabian Juries =

South African rugby union player

- Full name: Fabian Mark Juries
- Born: 28 February 1979 (age 47) Grahamstown, South Africa
- Height: 173 cm (5 ft 8 in)
- Weight: 76 kg (12 st 0 lb; 168 lb)
- School: Mary Waters, Grahamstown
- University: Kingswood College

Rugby union career
- Position: Fullback / Winger
- Current team: grahamstown brumbies
Youth career
- 1998–2000: Eastern Province
Amateur team(s)
Years	Team	Apps	(Points)
2015–present	Port Elizabeth Police	4	(10)
Senior career
Years	Team	Apps	(Points)
2001–2007	Mighty Elephants		
2003	Bulls	7	(15)
2008–2009	Free State Cheetahs	13	(35)
2009	Cheetahs	12	(0)
2009	→ Griffons	6	(20)
2010	Stormers	0	(0)
2010	Western Province	8	(0)
2011	Griquas	8	(10)
2011	Cheetahs	3	(0)
- Correct as of 22 February 2015
International career
Years	Team	Apps	(Points)
1998	South Africa Under-19		
2000	South Africa Under-21		
2000–2010	South Africa Sevens	50	(925)
- Correct as of 22 February 2015
Coaching career
- Years: Team
- 2024–: Kazakhstan 7s (Women)
- 2024-: Kazakhstan XVs (Women)

Medal record

Men's rugby sevens

Representing South Africa

Commonwealth Games
Bronze medal – third place	2002 Manchester	Team competition

Fabian Juries (born 28 February 1979) is a South African rugby union coach and former player.

== Rugby career ==
Juries led the World Series in tries scored in 2004 and again in 2008. He scored his 100th try against Scotland during the 2005 New Zealand Sevens tournament.

In 2008, he joined the Free State Cheetahs, before moving to Western Province at the beginning of the 2010 season. He was nominated for the World Rugby Sevens Player of the Year award, but lost to New Zealand’s DJ Forbes.

In 2020, he was still ranked among World Rugby's Sevens World Series' highest international try-scorers, he was ranked ninth, and was 29th in the highest point-scorer with 925 points.

== Coaching career ==
After his playing career, he was unemployed for six months before he landed a coaching job at Herbert Hurd Primary School in Port Elizabeth, where he spent five years as the Head of Rugby. He also worked part-time with the Kings sevens squad and the Nigeria national rugby sevens team.

Juries coached in Dubai at the Apollo Rugby Skills Academy. He was appointed as the Head Coach of the Kazakhstan women's sevens and fifteens teams in 2024.

== Personal life ==
Juries married his wife, Lucinda, in 2003 and they have two daughters, Kirsten and Keshia.
