= Kyrgyzstan women's national rugby union team =

Kyrgyzstan
- Union: Kyrgyzstan Rugby Union

First international
- Kyrgyzstan 0–38 Singapore (2008)

Largest defeat
- Kyrgyzstan 0–49 Hong Kong (2008)

The Kyrgyzstan women's national rugby union team are a national sporting side of Kyrgyzstan, representing them in Women's rugby union. They played their first international match against Hong Kong in 2008. The team has only played two matches to date.

== History ==
Kyrgyzstan played their first international match against Hong Kong on 3 June 2008 in Kazakhstan. It was part of the ARFU Women's Rugby Championship in Kazakhstan. As Kyrgyzstan are only associate members of World Rugby, they are currently unranked.

== Record ==
(Full internationals only)

Rugby: Kyrgyzstan internationals 2008-
Opponent	First game	Played	Won	Drawn	Lost	Percentage
Hong Kong	2008	1	0	0	1	0.00%
Singapore	2008	1	0	0	1	0.00%
Summary	2008	2	0	0	2	0.00%

=== Full internationals ===
Won	Lost	Draw

Test	Date	Opponent	PF	PA	Venue	Tournament
1	3 June 2008	Singapore	0	38	Taldykorgan, Kazakhstan	2008 ARFU Championship
2	7 June 2008	Hong Kong	10	17	Taldykorgan, Kazakhstan	2008 ARFU Championship

== See also ==
- Rugby union in Kyrgyzstan
