= 2016 Asia Pacific Championship =

Tournament details
- Host: Hong Kong
- Date: 9 – 17 December
- Teams: 3

Final positions
- Champions: Japan
- Runner-up: Hong Kong

Tournament statistics
- Matches played: 3

The 2016 Asia Pacific Women's Championship was a rugby union competition for women's national teams held in Hong Kong from 9 to 17 December 2016. This tournament doubled as the qualification to the 2017 Women's Rugby World Cup, which is why Fiji, by virtue of winning the 2016 Oceania Rugby Women's Championship, is attending. The top two teams directly qualify to the World Cup.

Japan and Hong Kong secured their places for the Rugby World Cup after both teams defeated Fiji.

== Table ==
Pos	Team	Pld	W	D	L	PF	PA	PD	Pts
1	Japan	2	2	0	0	75	8	+67	9
2	Hong Kong	2	1	0	1	53	27	+26	5
3	Fiji	2	0	0	2	7	100	−93	0

== Matches ==
2016-12-09	Hong Kong	45–7	Fiji	Hong Kong

2016-12-13	Japan	55–0	Fiji	Hong Kong

2016-12-17	Hong Kong	8–20	Japan	Hong Kong
