= 2022 Asia Rugby Women's Championship =

11th edition of the Asia Rugby Women's Championship

Tournament details
- Host: Hong Kong
- Date: December 10, 2022 - December 17, 2022
- Countries: Hong Kong; Kazakhstan
- Teams: 2

Final positions
- Champions: Hong Kong (1st title)
- Runner-up: Kazakhstan

Tournament statistics
- Matches played: 2
- Tries scored: 12 (6 per match)
- Website: Asia Rugby

The 2022 Asia Rugby Women's Championship is the 11th edition of the Asia Rugby Women's Championship following the cancellation of the 2021 edition due to COVID-19 related restrictions. Hong Kong hosted Kazakhstan on a 2 match series for the title.

== Standings ==
Pos	Team	Pld	W	D	L	PF	PA	PD	Pts
1	Hong Kong	2	2	0	0	45	29	+16	8
2	Kazakhstan	2	0	0	2	29	45	−16	0

Source: Asia Rugby

== Results ==
2022-12-10	Hong Kong	31-17	Kazakhstan	Siu Sai Wan Sports Ground, Hong Kong
7:00 UTC (15:00 Local)	Try: Jessica Eden (2) 21' m, 55' m Hoi Yan Poon 38' m Natasha Olson-Thorne 44' m Tsz Ching Chan 72' m Pen: Aileen Ryan (2) 4', 79'		Try: Lyudmila Sherer 15' m Galina Krassavina 18' c Amina Tulegenova 57' m Con: Mariya Grishina 19'

2022-12-17	Hong Kong	14-12	Kazakhstan	Hong Kong Football Club Stadium, Hong Kong
10:15 UTC (18:15 Local)	Try: Sin Yi Au Yeung 73' c Zoe Smith 79' c Con: Aileen Ryan (2) 74', 80'		Try: Lyudmila Sherer 39' c Balzhan Koishibayeva 47' m Con: Mariya Grishina 40'
