= 2025 Asia Rugby Women's Championship =

Tournament details
- Host: Japan
- Date: 15–25 May 2025
- Countries: Hong Kong; Japan; Kazakhstan
- Teams: 3

Final positions
- Champions: Japan (7th title)
- Runner-up: Hong Kong

Tournament statistics
- Matches played: 3
- Tries scored: 33 (11 per match)
- Most tries: Natsuki Ouchida (4)

The 2025 Asia Rugby Women's Championship was the 14th edition of the Asia Rugby Women's Championship. The tournament was held in Fukuoka, Japan and took place from 15 to 25 May. Matches were played at Japan Rugby’s high performance national rugby training centre.

Japan won their seventh championship title after defeating Hong Kong in the final match.

== Standings ==
Pos	Team	Pld	W	D	L	PF	PA	PD	TF	TA	TB	LB	Pts
1	Japan	2	2	0	0	153	5	+148	25	1	2	0	10
2	Hong Kong	2	1	0	1	34	75	−41	6	13	1	0	5
3	Kazakhstan	2	0	0	2	12	119	−107	2	19	0	0	0

Source: Asia Rugby

== Fixtures ==
15 May 2025
13:00 JST (UTC+09:00)

(1BP) Japan	90–0	Kazakhstan
Try: Kanako Kobayashi 5' c Mele Yua Havili Kagawa 8' c Mio Nishimura (2) 15' c, 70' c Sakurako Korai (3) 25' m, 66' c, 79' m Hinata Komaki 40' m Ayumu Kokaji 41' c Saya Nakamura 45' c Miho Matsunaga (2) 52' c, 76' c Nao Ando 62' c Kotono Yasuo 73' m Con: Ayasa Otsuka (3/4) 6', 9', 16'; Sora Nishimura (7/10) 42', 46', 53', 63', 67', 70', 77'	report	Cards: Anna Melnikova (yellow card) 40'

Japan Base, Fukuoka
Referee: Sunny Lee (HKCR)

Team details

1	Hinata Komaki
2	Ayumu Kokaji
3	Miharu Machida
4	Saya Nakamura
5	Mio Nishimura
6	Sakurako Korai (c)
7	Kyoko Hosokawa
8	Sakura Mizutani
9	Anan Seo
10	Ayasa Otsuka
11	Nana Tarekado
12	Kanako Kobayashi
13	Nao Ando
14	Mele Yua Havili Kagawa
15	Sora Nishimura
Replacements:
16	Haruna Kojima
17	Nami Yoshida
18	Yuka Sadaka
19	Miho Matsunaga
20	Moe Nagaoka
21	Mio Yamanaka
22	Kotono Yasuo
23	Arisa Nishi
Coach:
(Canada) Lesley McKenzie

1	Yelena Yurova
2	Xeniya Kim
3	Natalya Kamendrovskaya (c)
4	Yuliya Oleinikova
5	Symbat Zhamankulova
6	Anna Chebotar
7	Mariya Grishina
8	Anzhelika Pichugina
9	Alyona Drobovskaya
10	Yekaterina Savina
11	Amina Tulegenova
12	Anna Melnikova
13	Veronika Stepanyuga
14	Oxana Shadrina
15	Tatyana Kruchinkina
Replacements:
16	Darya Simakova
17	Darya Tkachyova
18	Irina Balabina
19	Viktoriya Kuznetsova
20	Svetlana Malezhina
21	Ayaulym Bakytpek
22	Amina Sharip
23	Angelina Kuznetsova
Coach:
(South Africa) Fabian Juries

Assistant referees:
Craig Chan (HKCR)

Television match official:
Just Wang (SRU)

20 May 2025
13:00 JST (UTC+09:00)

Hong Kong China	29–12	Kazakhstan
Try: Tanya Dhar 10' m Kea Marie Herewini 29' c Shanna Forrest 40' m Jessica Eden 59' m Grace Hood 78' c Con: Wing-Yin Lo (1/3) 30'; Tsz Ting Lee (1/2) 79'		Try: Oxana Shadrina 54' m Natalya Kamendrovskaya 63' c Con: Tatyana Kruchinkina (1/2) 64'

Japan Base, Fukuoka
Referee: Ano Kuwai (JRFU)

Team details

1	Lau Nga-wun
2	Tanya Dhar
3	Kea Marie Herewini
4	Chow Mei-Nam
5	Roshini Turner
6	Chloe Baltazar
7	Pun Wai-Yan
8	Shanna Forrest
9	Au King-To
10	Wing-Yin Lo
11	Jessica Eden
12	Qian Jiayu
13	Abigail Chan
14	Chong Ka-Yan
15	Hoi-Yan Poon
Replacements:
16	Iris Lam
17	Ki Sum Ng
18	Wing Yi Vincci Leung
19	Naomi Netanya Emile Peeters
20	Sin Yi Au Yeung
21	Tsz Yau Wan
22	Tsz Ting Lee
23	Grace Hood
Coach:
(England) Lewis Wilson

1	Yelena Yurova
2	Xeniya Kim
3	Natalya Kamendrovskaya (c)
4	Anna Chebotar
5	Symbat Zhamankulova
6	Svetlana Malezhina
7	Mariya Grishina
8	Anzhelika Pichugina
9	Alyona Drobovskaya
10	Yekaterina Savina
11	Amina Tulegenova
12	Anna Melnikova
13	Veronika Stepanyuga
14	Oxana Shadrina
15	Tatyana Kruchinkina
Replacements:
16	Darya Simakova
17	Darya Tkachyova
18	Irina Balabina
19	Viktoriya Kuznetsova
20	Yuliya Oleinikova
21	Ayaulym Bakytpek
22	Liliya Kibisheva
23	Natalya Vlassova
Coach:
(South Africa) Fabian Juries

Assistant referees:
Hibiki Ikeda (JRFU)
Koki Yamamuchi (JRFU)
Television match official:
Tasuku Kawahara (JRFU)

25 May 2025
13:00 JST (UTC+09:00)

Japan	63–5	Hong Kong China
Try: Kanako Kobayashi (3) 9' m, 16' c, 69' c Sakura Mizutani 12' m Natsuki Ouchida (4) 23' m, 26' c, 44' m, 77' m Sakurako Korai 49' c Mele Yua Havili Kagawa 60'm Arisa Nishi 74' m Con: Ayasa Otsuka (2/6) 16', 27'; Sora Nishimura (2/5) 49', 70'	report	Try: Chong Ka-yan 58' m

Japan Base, Fukuoka
Referee: Christabelle Lim (SRU)

Team details

1	Hinata Komaki
2	Ayumu Kokaji
3	Miharu Machida
4	Saya Nakamura
5	Mio Nishimura
6	Sakurako Korai (c)
7	Kyoko Hosokawa
8	Sakura Mizutani
9	Anan Seo
10	Ayasa Otsuka
11	Natsuki Ouchida
12	Kanako Kobayashi
13	Nao Ando
14	Mele Yua Havili Kagawa
15	Sora Nishimura
Replacements:
16	Moe Nagaoka
17	Nami Yoshida
18	Yuka Sadaka
19	Miho Matsunaga
20	Kasumi Murase
21	Mio Yamanaka
22	Nana Tarekado
23	Arisa Nishi
Coach:
(Canada) Lesley McKenzie

1	Lau Nga-wun
2	Iris Lam
3	Lee Ka-Shun
4	Chow Mei-Nam
5	Roshini Turner
6	Pun Wai-Yan
7	Winnie Siu
8	Shanna Forrest
9	Au King-To
10	Wing-Yin Lo
11	Chong Ka-Yan
12	Jessica Eden
13	Grace Hood
14	Zoe Smith
15	Hoi Yan Poon
Replacements:
16	Fion Yuei-Tein Got
17	Ki Sum Ng
18	Kea Herewini
19	Naomi Netanya Emile Peters
20	Sin Yi Au Yeung
21	Tsz Yau Wan
22	Tsz Ting Lee
23	Haruka Uematsu
Coach:
(England) Lewis Wilson

Assistant referees:
Qu Shanggang (CRFA)
Television match official:
Tony Duminy (UAERF)
