= Kumagaya Rugby Ground =

Sports stadium in Saitama Prefecture, Japan

- 熊谷ラグビー場
- Kumagaya Rugby Stadium
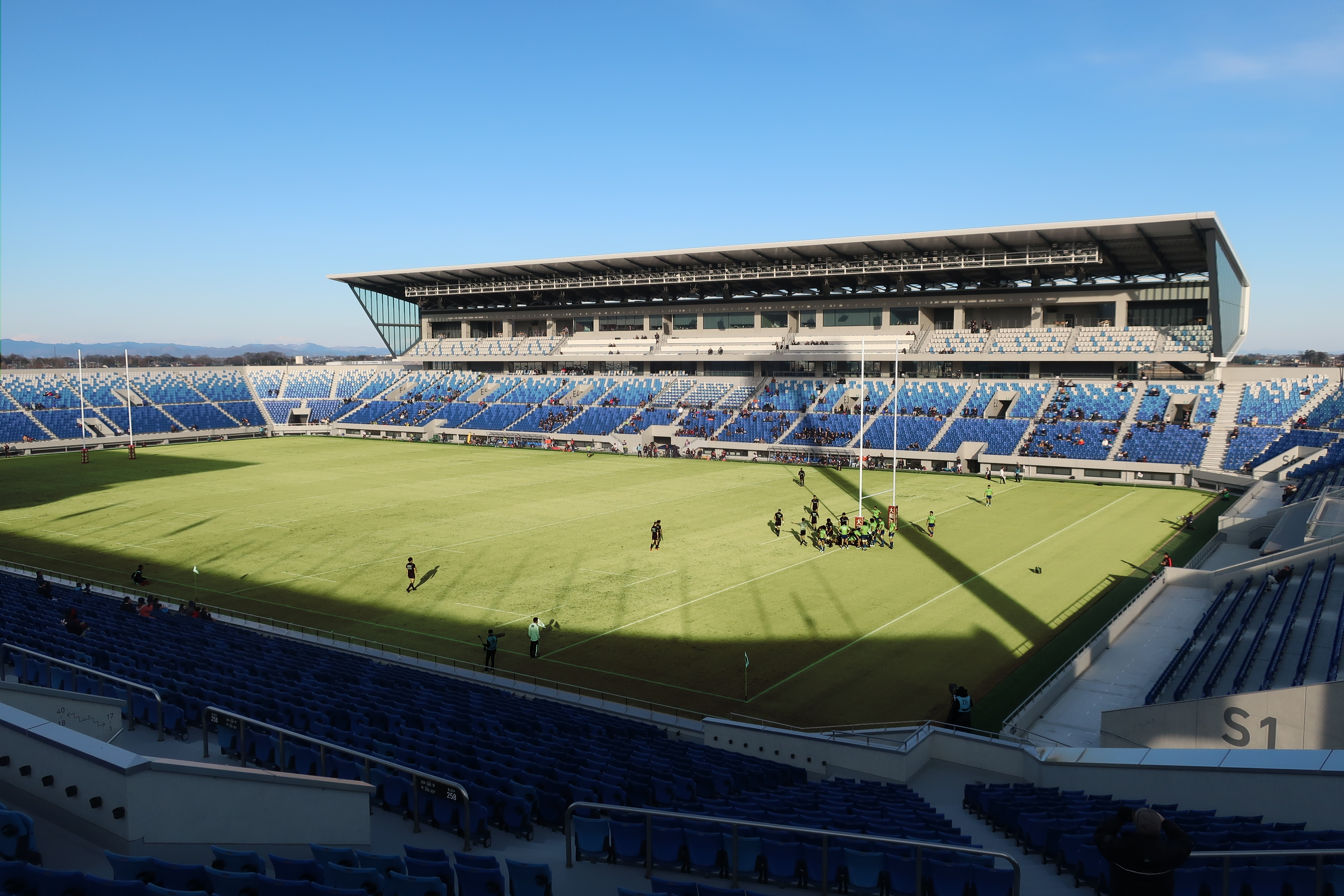
- View of main grandstand, 2019.
- Interactive map of Kumagaya Rugby Ground
- Address: 810 Kamikawakami, Kumagaya, Saitama 360-0004
- Coordinates: 36°10′06″N 139°24′09″E
- Owner: Saitama Prefecture
- Operator: Panasonic
- Capacity: 25,600
- Surface: Grass
- Record attendance: 24,895 (Georgia–Uruguay, 2019 Rugby World Cup)
- Field shape: Rectangular
- Public transit: Kumagaya Station

Construction
- Built: 1991; 35 years ago
- Renovated: 2016–2018
- Expanded: 2018; 8 years ago
- Years active: 1991–present
- Cost: ¥12.4 billion (2018 expansion; US$111.3 million)
- Architects: Shimizu Corporation; MHS Planners, Architects & Engineers Ltd. (2018 expansion)

Tenants
- Japan Rugby League One Saitama Wild Knights (2021–present) Other National High School Rugby Tournament

Kumagaya Rugby Stadium (熊谷ラグビー場), is a rugby stadium in Kumagaya, Saitama Prefecture, Japan. It is currently used mostly for rugby union matches. The stadium was built in 1991 and renovated between 2016 and 2018. Its capacity expanded from 20,000 (10,000 seated) to 24,000 (fully seated). The stadium is part of a larger sports complex which includes the Kumagaya Athletic Stadium, a smaller athletics stadium and a large arena. The complex is located in the Kumagaya Park.

== Uses ==
It is the main stadium for rugby in the Saitama Prefecture, and serves as the home stadium of Japan Rugby League One (JRLO) club Saitama Wild Knights. It is also used for University League games and sometimes also for other Japan Rugby League One matches.

The stadium was one of the venues used for the 2019 Rugby World Cup the first Rugby World Cup (RWC) to be held in Japan and Asia. 6,000 temporary seats were added to increase the stadium capacity.

== Gallery ==
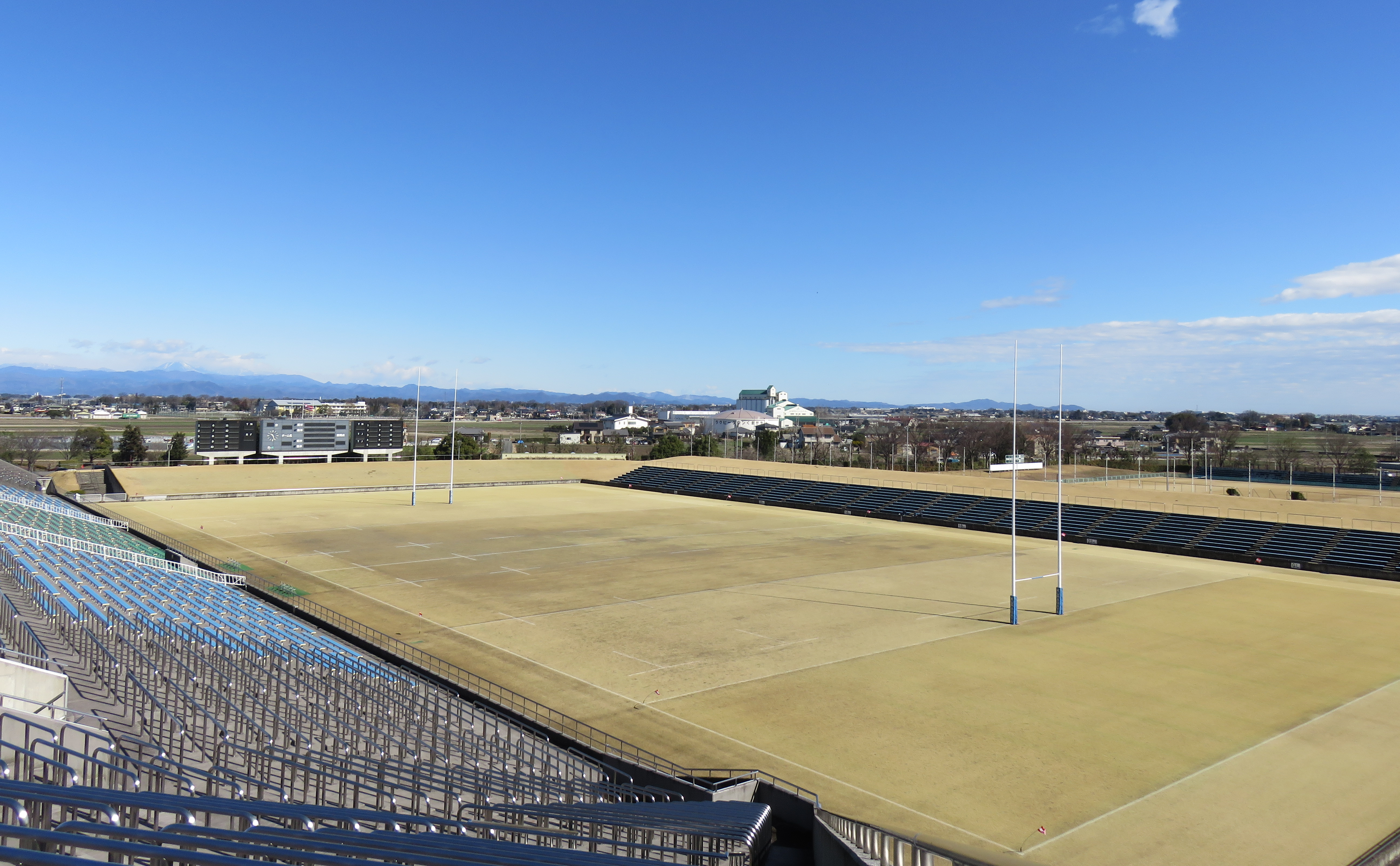
Before renovation, 2016

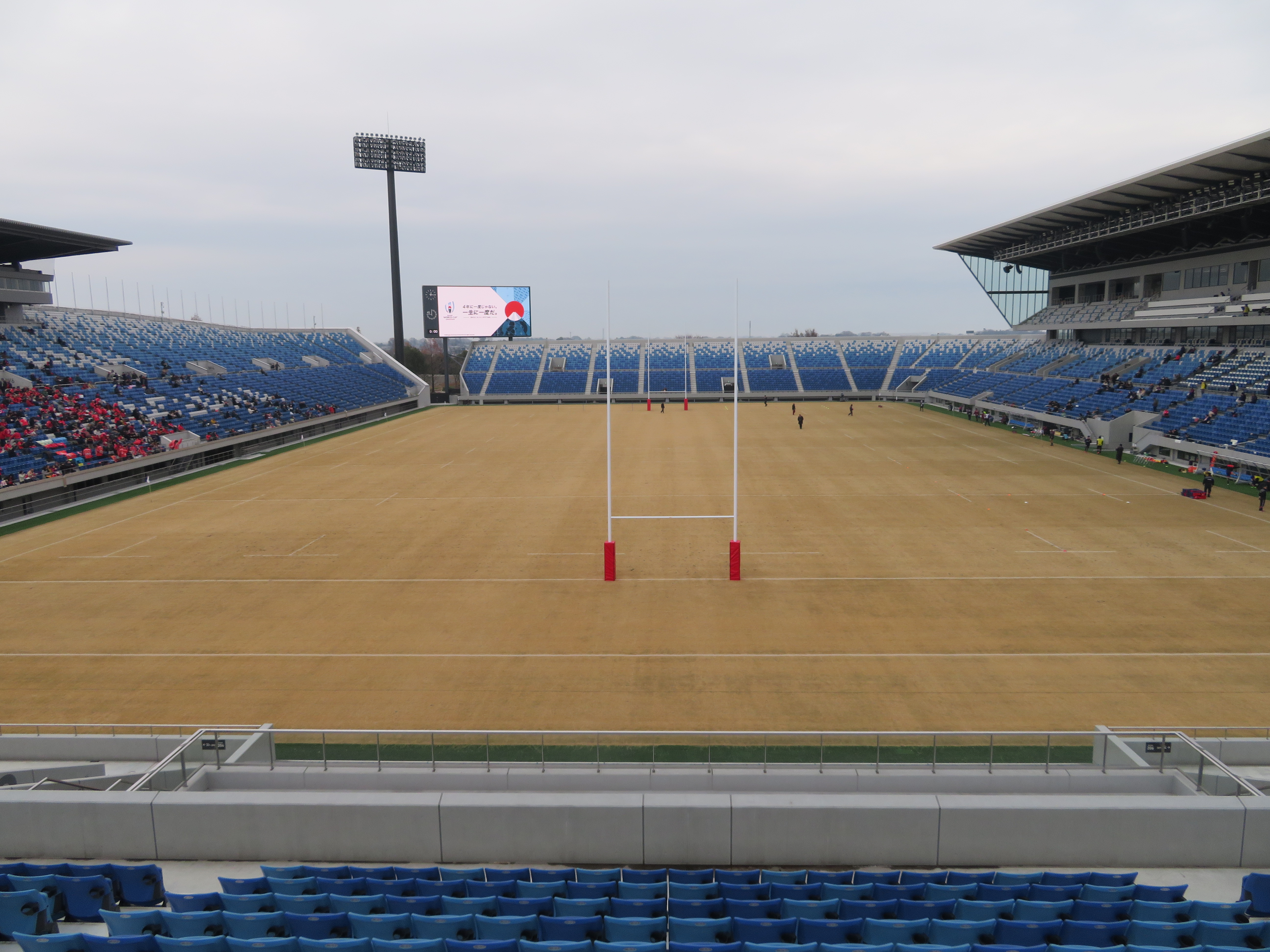
Field view from Southern Stand, 2018

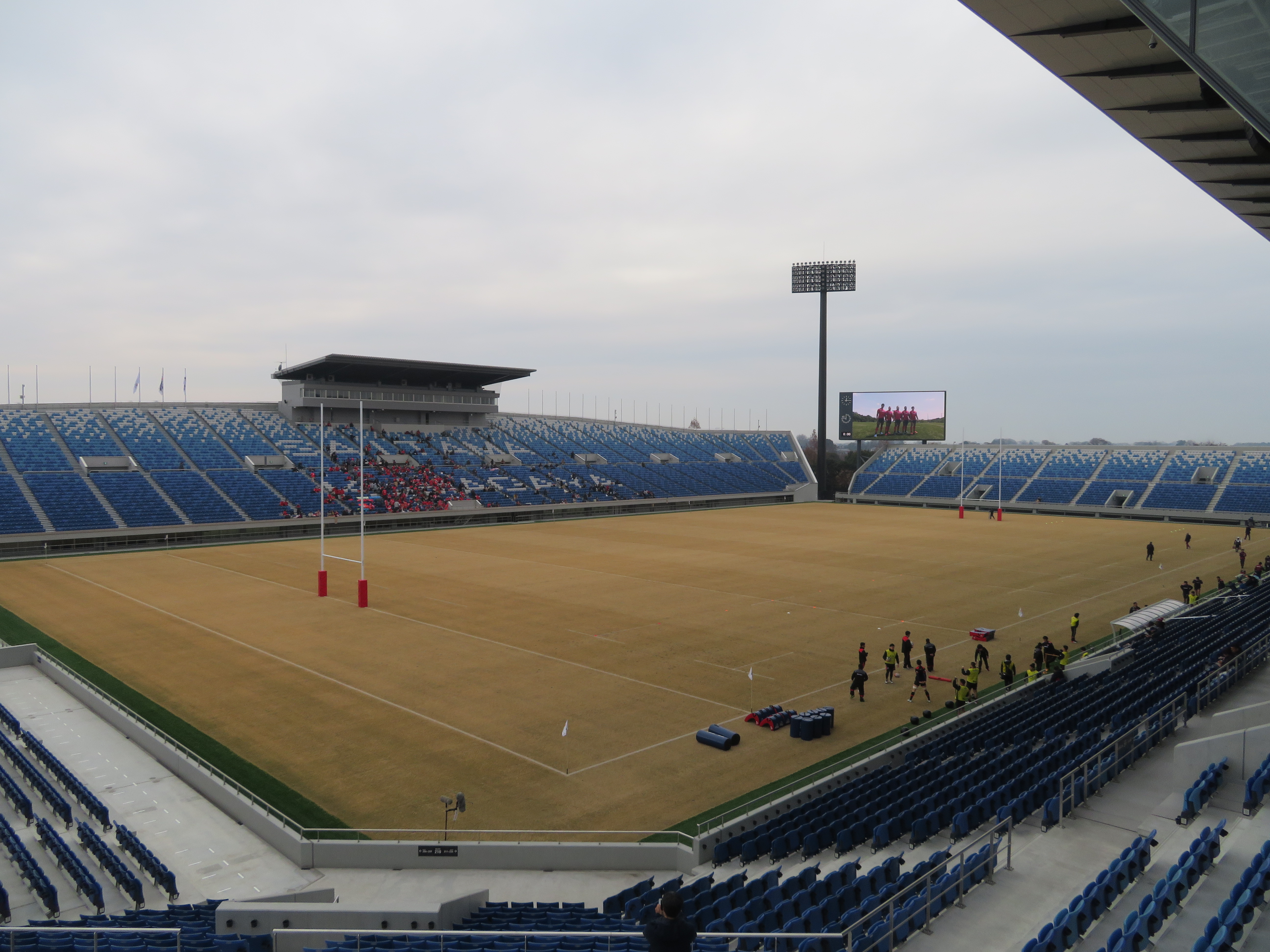
Field view from Eastern Stand, 2018

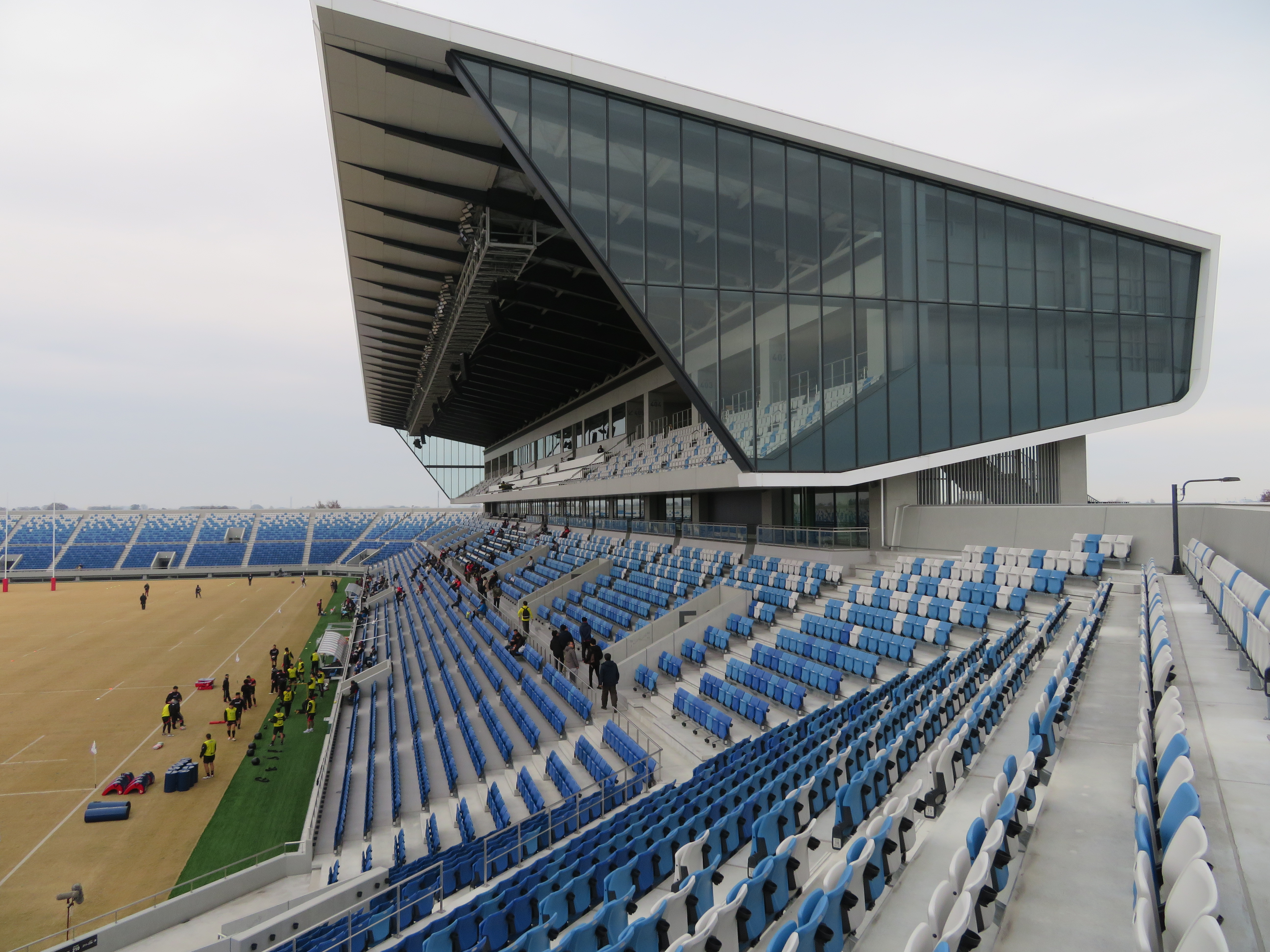
View of main grand stand, 2018
