= 2008 ARFU Women's Rugby Championship =

Tournament details
- Host: Kazakhstan
- Venue: Taldykorgan
- Date: 3–7 June
- Countries: Hong Kong; Japan; Kazakhstan; Kyrgyzstan; Singapore; Uzbekistan
- Teams: 6

Final positions
- Champions: Kazakhstan (2nd title)
- Runner-up: Japan
- Third place: Uzbekistan
- Fourth place: Singapore

Tournament statistics
- Matches played: 7

The 2008 ARFU Women's Rugby Championship was the third edition of the tournament. It was hosted by defending champions Kazakhstan in Taldykorgan from the 3rd to the 7th of June. The tournament saw the addition of two other teams to the typical four competing teams. Kazakhstan were crowned champions again after beating Japan 39–3 in the final.

== Standings ==
Pos	Team	Pld	W	D	L	PF	PA	PD
1	Kazakhstan	2	2	0	0	103	6	+97
2	Japan	2	1	0	1	20	49	–29
3	Uzbekistan	2	1	0	1	11	70	–5
4	Singapore	2	1	0	1	48	17	–31
5	Hong Kong	2	1	0	1	55	8	+47
6	Kyrgyzstan	2	0	0	2	0	87	–87

== Bracket ==
First round
3 June
Hong Kong	6
Uzbekistan	8
3 June
Kyrgyzstan	0
Singapore	38

Semifinals
5 June
Kazakhstan	64
Uzbekistan	3
5 June
Japan	17
Singapore	10

Final
7 June
Kazakhstan	39
Japan	3

== Results ==
=== First round ===
2008-06-03

Kyrgyzstan	0–38	Singapore

Taldykorgan, Kazakhstan

2008-06-03

Hong Kong	6–8	Uzbekistan

Taldykorgan, Kazakhstan

=== Semi-finals ===
2008-06-05

Kazakhstan	64–3	Uzbekistan

Taldykorgan, Kazakhstan

2008-06-05

Japan	17–10	Singapore

Taldykorgan, Kazakhstan

=== 5th–6th ===
2008-06-07

Hong Kong	49–0	Kyrgyzstan

Taldykorgan, Kazakhstan

=== 3rd–4th ===
2008-06-07

Singapore	0–15	Uzbekistan

Taldykorgan, Kazakhstan

=== Final ===
2008-06-07

Kazakhstan	39–3	Japan

Taldykorgan, Kazakhstan
