= 2010 Women's Rugby World Cup qualifying =

2010 Rugby World Cup qualifying
Tournament details
- Dates: 2006 – 2010
- No. of nations: 18

The qualification process for the 2010 Women's Rugby World Cup began on 6 February 2009. A total of 12 teams qualified for the tournament, which was held in England between 20 August – 5 September 2010.

== Qualification process ==
When the winning bid to host the World Cup was announced in September 2008, Bernard Lapasset (Rugby World Cup Limited Board Chairman) promised that:

"These two tournaments [the Sevens and XVs World Cups], in conjunction with a global qualification process and existing tournament structures, will guarantee an unprecedented level of elite Women's competition for around 90 Unions over the next two years. This expanded competition pathway underpinned by the Women's Strategic Plan point to what promises to be the most competitive Women's Rugby World Cup ever in 2010".

However, when details of the qualification process were released in March 2009 it was revealed that most IRB members would not be given an opportunity to compete for a place. Qualification tournaments took place in two regions – Europe and Asia – while in Oceania two nations played off in a single game for one place. Elsewhere the IRB nominated the "qualifying" nation, all other nations in these regions were excluded. Even where qualification tournaments took place the majority of rugby playing countries did not take part.

No official explanation was given by the IRB, but at the time of the Oceania qualifier it was reported that the non-participation of some nations – including Fiji and Papua New Guinea – was due to financial difficulties.

== Regional Qualification ==
Region	Automatic qualifiers	Teams in qualifying process	Qualifying places	Qualified teams	World Cup pools
Africa	1	0	0	South Africa (AQ)	A
Americas	2	0	0	Canada (AQ); United States (AQ)	C B
Asia	0	4	1	Kazakhstan	B
Europe	2	10	4	England (AQ); France (AQ); Wales; Ireland; Scotland; Sweden	B C A B C C
Oceania	1	2	1	Australia; New Zealand (AQ)	A A
TOTAL	6	16	6	-	-

=== European Qualification ===
England and France qualified directly as runner-up and third place in the WRWC 2006. Wales and Ireland qualified for the Tournament as second and third in the 2009 RBS 6 Nations. Scotland and Sweden, qualify as top two teams from the 2009 FIRA-AER Women's European Trophy, held in Sweden from 17 to 23 May 2009. This competition was made up of the 5th and 6th placed six nations teams (Scotland and Italy) as well as Spain, Netherlands, Russia, Sweden, Germany and Belgium

=== Americas Qualification ===
The United States and Canada qualified directly.

=== African Qualification ===
South Africa qualified directly

=== Asian Qualification ===
Kazakhstan won the ARFU Women's XV Tournament, defeating Japan in the final, to qualify as the Asia representative

==== Semi-finals ====
4 November 2009

Singapore	11–35	Japan

Republic Polytechnic, Singapore

4 November 2009

Hong Kong	14–58	Kazakhstan

Republic Polytechnic, Singapore

==== Third place final ====
6 November 2009

Singapore	3–16	Hong Kong

Padang, Singapore

==== Final ====
6 November 2009

Japan	5–43	Kazakhstan

Padang, Singapore

=== Oceanic Qualification ===
New Zealand qualified directly as winner of the WRWC 2006. Australia beat Samoa in a one-off match to determine the second FORU representative at the WRWC 2010. A four team tournament had been planned with Fiji as the proposed host, but Fiji declined invitations to host or enter the tournament, citing the size of the entry fee (A$36,000), though the women's association president, Adi Vela Naucukidi, complained that the Fiji RFU had taken the decision without consulting them, or giving them an opportunity to raise the money. Shortly afterwards Papua New Guinea also withdrew for financial reasons

8 August 2009

Samoa	0–87	Australia

Samoa
