= 2015 Asia Rugby Women's Championship =

2015 Asia Rugby Championship
- Countries: Japan; Hong Kong; Kazakhstan
- Number of teams: 3
- Date: 25 April–23 May
- Champions: Japan
- Runners-up: Kazakhstan
- Matches played: 3

The 2015 Asia Rugby Women's Championship featured a new name and format after ARFU reorganized the competition. Previously known as the Asian Women's Four Nations, the championship was now called the Asia Rugby Women's Championship. It would be played as a round robin competition. Kazakhstan hosted Hong Kong in Alamaty for the first match. The following games were played as curtain-raisers for the men's ARC games in Fukuoka, Japan on 9 May and in Hong Kong on 23 May. Japan won the Championship.

== Table ==
Pos	Team	Pld	W	D	L	PF	PA	PD	Pts
1	Japan	2	2	0	0	54	24	+30	11
2	Kazakhstan	2	1	0	1	52	27	+25	6
3	Hong Kong	2	0	0	2	12	67	−55	0

== Results ==
2015-04-25

Kazakhstan	40–0	Hong Kong

Almaty Central Stadium, Almaty, Kazakhstan

2015-05-09

Japan	27–12	Kazakhstan

Level-5 Stadium, Fukuoka

2015-05-23

Hong Kong	12–27	Japan

Aberdeen Sports Ground, Aberdeen, Hong Kong
