= Uzbekistan women's national rugby union team =

Uzbekistan
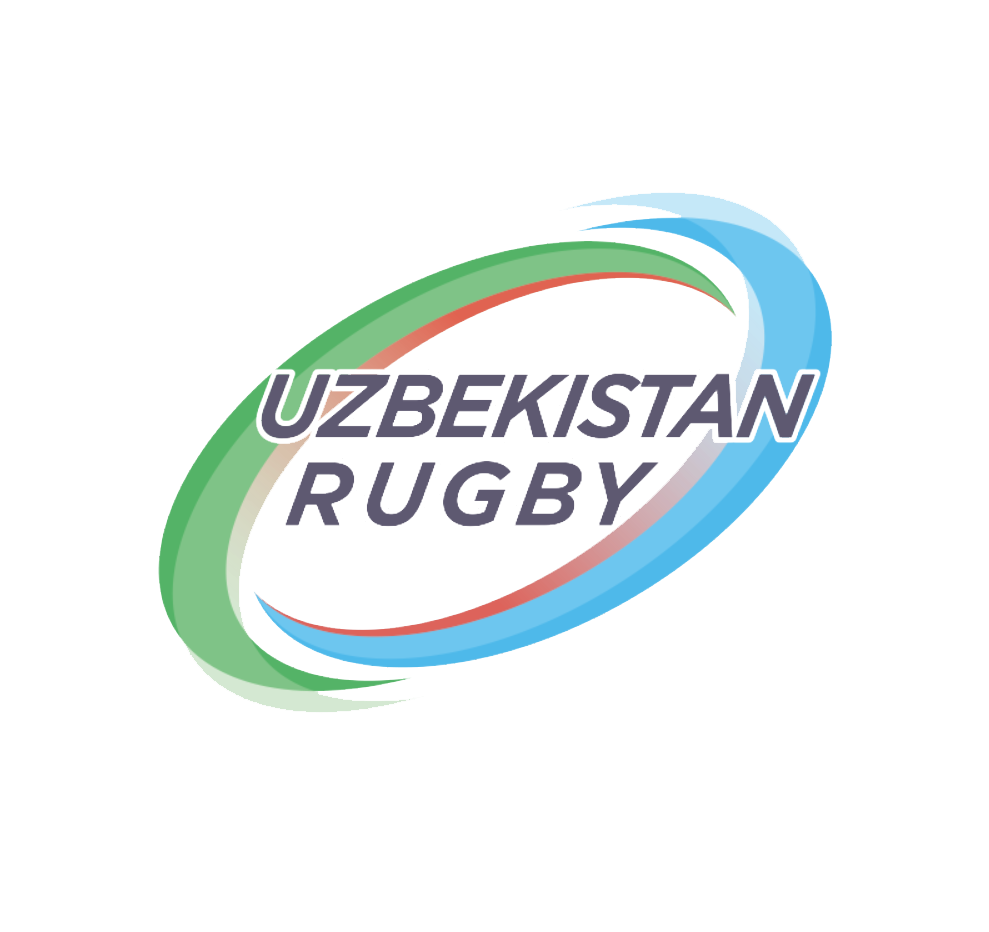
- Union: Uzbekistan Rugby Union

World Rugby ranking
- Current: 60 (as of 2 March 2026)
- Highest: 56
- Lowest: 60 (2026)

First international
- Hong Kong 6–8 Uzbekistan (Taldykorgan; 3 June 2008)

Biggest win
- Singapore 0–15 Uzbekistan (Taldykorgan; 7 June 2008)

Biggest defeat
- Kazakhstan 64–3 Uzbekistan (Taldykorgan; 5 June 2008)

The Uzbekistan women's national rugby union team is a national sporting side that represents Uzbekistan in women's international rugby union. They played their first test match against Hong Kong in 2008.

== History ==
The Uzbekistan women's team was formed in 2008, they made their international debut during that year's Asian Women's Championship and finished in fourth place.

In November 2011, they took to the field again for their most recent international outing.

== Results summary ==
(Full internationals only, updated to 23 April 2023)

Uzbekistan Internationals From 2008
Opponent	First Match	Played	Won	Drawn	Lost	For	Against	Win %
Hong Kong	2008	1	1	0	0	8	6	100.00%
Kazakhstan	2008	2	0	0	2	6	122	0.00%
Singapore	2008	1	1	0	0	15	0	100.00%
Summary	2008	4	2	0	2	29	128	50.00%

== Results ==
=== Full internationals ===
Won	Lost	Draw

Test	Date	PF	PA	Opponent	Venue	Event	Ref
1	3 June 2008	8	6	Hong Kong	Taldykorgan	2008 ARFU Championship	
2	5 June 2008	3	64	Kazakhstan	Taldykorgan	2008 ARFU Championship	
3	7 June 2008	15	0	Singapore	Taldykorgan	2008 ARFU Championship	
4	14 May 2011	3	58	Kazakhstan	Kazakh National University, Almaty	Test	

== Total ==
#	Year	M	W	L	PW	PL	PD
1	2026	3	3	9	13	-5	
2	2025	3	3	9	13	-5	
3	2024	3	3	9	13	-5	
4	2023	3	3	9	13	-5	
5	2022	3	3	9	13	-5	
6	2021	3	3	9	13	-5	
Total		3	9	13	-5		

== Seven Results ==
=== 2026 ===
1. Uzbekistan 0-59 Japan
2. Uzbekistan 7-29 Kazakhstan
3. Uzbekistan 5-22 United Arab Emirates
4. Uzbekistan 0-52 China
5. Uzbekistan 0-22 Kazakhstan
6. Uzbekistan 14-5 Singapore

=== 2025 ===
1. Uzbekistan 0-59 Japan
2. Uzbekistan 7-29 Kazakhstan
3. Uzbekistan 5-22 United Arab Emirates
4. Uzbekistan 0-52 China
5. Uzbekistan 0-22 Kazakhstan
6. Uzbekistan 14-5 Singapore
