= 2014 Asia Women's Four Nations =

Tournament details
- Host: Hong Kong
- Dates: 18 May 2014– 24 May 2014
- Countries: Hong Kong; Kazakhstan; Japan; Singapore
- Teams: 4

Final positions
- Champions: Kazakhstan
- Runner-up: Hong Kong
- Third place: Japan
- Fourth place: Singapore

Tournament statistics
- Matches played: 6

The 2014 Asia Women's Four Nations Championship was hosted in Hong Kong from 18 to 24 May, matches were played as a round robin format. Kazakhstan were undefeated and successfully defended their Asian Four Nations title.

== Table ==
Pos	Team	Pld	W	D	L	PF	PA	PD	Pts
1	Kazakhstan	3	3	0	0	130	27	+103	14
2	Hong Kong	3	2	0	1	78	32	+46	10
3	Japan	3	1	0	2	68	69	−1	6
4	Singapore	3	0	0	3	10	158	−148	0

== Results ==
2014-05-18

Japan	37–5	Singapore

Aberdeen Stadium, Aberdeen, Hong Kong

2014-05-18

Hong Kong	10–13	Kazakhstan

Aberdeen Stadium, Aberdeen, Hong Kong

2014-05-21

Kazakhstan	68–0	Singapore

Aberdeen Stadium, Aberdeen, Hong Kong

2014-05-21

Hong Kong	15–14	Japan

Aberdeen Stadium, Aberdeen, Hong Kong

2014-05-24

Hong Kong	53–5	Singapore

Aberdeen Stadium, Aberdeen, Hong Kong

2014-05-24

Kazakhstan	49–17	Japan

Aberdeen Stadium, Aberdeen, Hong Kong
