= 2013 Asia Women's Four Nations =

Tournament details
- Host: Kazakhstan
- Venue: Almaty Central Stadium, Almaty
- Date: 4 & 7 September
- Countries: Hong Kong; Japan; Kazakhstan; Singapore
- Teams: 4

Final positions
- Champions: Kazakhstan (4th title)
- Runner-up: Japan
- Third place: Singapore
- Fourth place: Hong Kong

Tournament statistics
- Matches played: 4

The 2013 Asia Women's Four Nations was the sixth edition of the competition and was the final qualifying round for the Asia Region to the 2014 Women's Rugby World Cup. It was played as a knockout tournament, and was hosted at Almaty in Kazakhstan on the 4th and 7th of September. Kazakhstan won their fourth title and qualified for the World Cup in France.

== Standings ==
Pos	Team	Pld	W	D	L	PF	PA	PD
1	Kazakhstan	2	2	0	0	116	30	+86
2	Japan	2	1	0	1	105	25	+80
3	Singapore	2	1	0	1	24	106	–82
4	Hong Kong	2	0	0	2	15	99	–84

== Bracket ==
Semi-finals
4 September – Almaty
Kazakhstan	91
Singapore	7
4 September – Almaty
Japan	82
Hong Kong	0

Final
7 September – Almaty
Kazakhstan	25
Japan	23
Third place
7 September - Almaty
Singapore	17
Hong Kong	15

== Results ==
=== Semi-finals ===
2013-09-04

Japan	82–0	Hong Kong

Almaty Central Stadium, Almaty, Kazakhstan

2013-09-04

Kazakhstan	91–7	Singapore

Almaty Central Stadium, Almaty, Kazakhstan

=== Third place ===
2013-09-07

Singapore	17–15	Hong Kong

Almaty Central Stadium, Almaty, Kazakhstan

=== Final ===
2013-09-07

Kazakhstan	25–23	Japan

Almaty Central Stadium, Almaty, Kazakhstan
