= 2012 Asia Women's Four Nations =

Tournament details
- Host: China
- Venue: Kunshan
- Date: 5 & 7 July
- Countries: China; Hong Kong; Japan; Kazakhstan
- Teams: 4

Final positions
- Champions: Kazakhstan (3rd title)
- Runner-up: Japan
- Third place: Hong Kong
- Fourth place: China

Tournament statistics
- Matches played: 4

The 2012 Asia Women's Four Nations was the fifth edition of the tournament. It was hosted by China in Kunshan. The event took place on the 5th and 7th of July. Kazakhstan won their 3rd after defeating Japan 17–8 in the final.

== Standings ==
Pos	Team	Pld	W	D	L	PF	PA	PD
1	Kazakhstan	2	2	0	0	68	8	+60
2	Japan	2	1	0	1	49	34	+15
3	Hong Kong	2	1	0	1	44	44	0
4	China	2	0	0	2	3	78	–75

== Bracket ==
Semi-finals
5 July – Kunshan
Japan	41
Hong Kong	17
5 July – Kunshan
Kazakhstan	51
China	0

Final
7 July – Kunshan
Japan	8
Kazakhstan	17
Third place
7 July - Kunshan
China	3
Hong Kong	27

== Results ==
=== Semi-finals ===
2012-07-05

Japan	41–17	Hong Kong

Kunshan, China

2012-07-05

Kazakhstan	51–0	China

Kunshan, China

=== Third place ===
2012-07-07

China	3–27	Hong Kong

Kunshan, China

=== Final ===
2012-07-07

Japan	8–17	Kazakhstan

Kunshan, China
