= Aberdeen Sports Ground =

Sports ground in Hong Kong

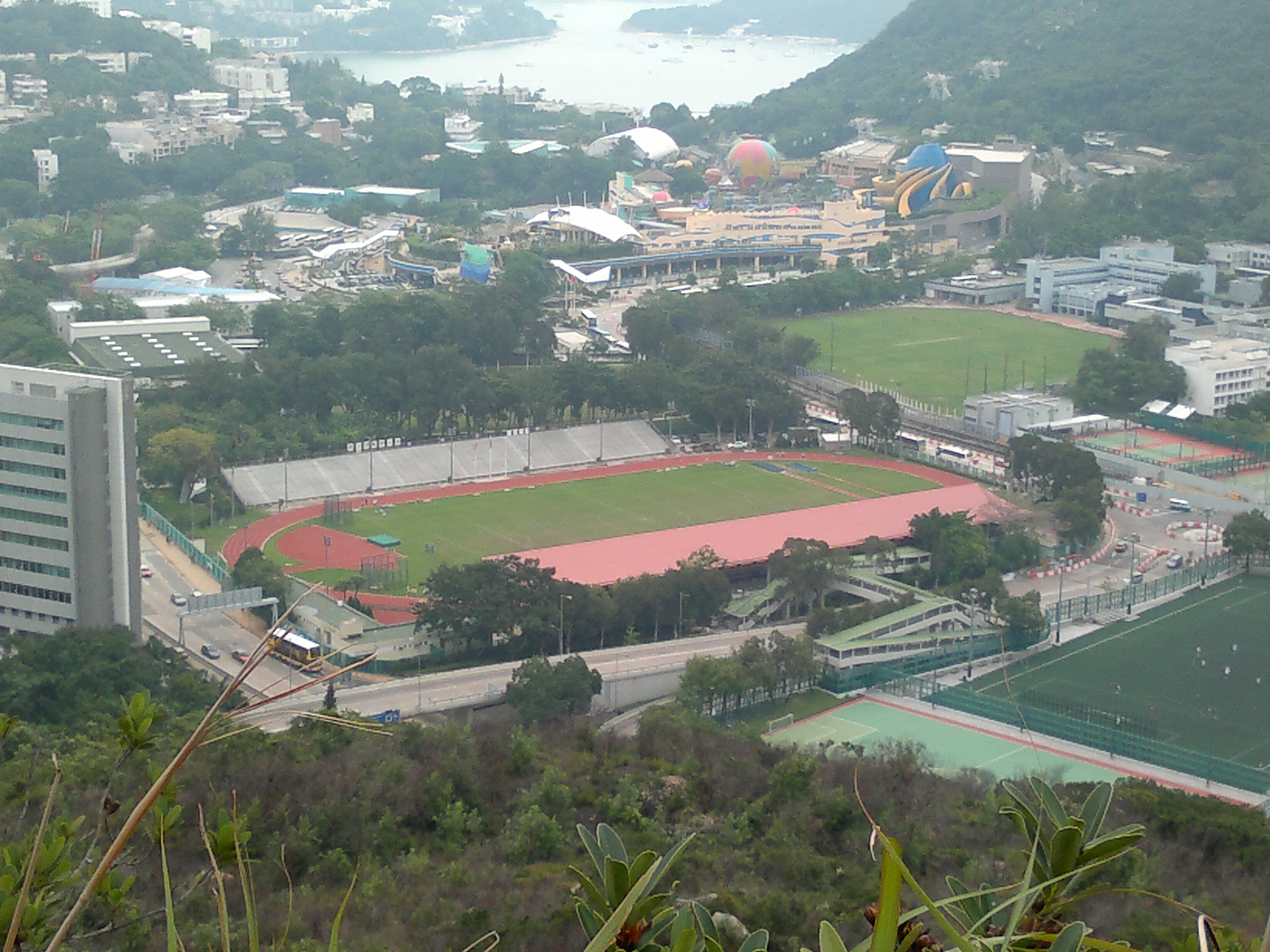
- Aberdeen Sports Ground viewed from Bennet's Hill
- Interactive map of Aberdeen Sports Ground
- Location: 108 Wong Chuk Hang Road, Aberdeen, Hong Kong
- Coordinates: 22.250087°N 114.172398°E
- Owner: Hong Kong Government
- Operator: Leisure and Cultural Services Department
- Capacity: 9,000
- Surface: Grass
- Pitch size: 100 x 64 metres (110 x 70 yards)
- Public transit: Ocean Park station

Construction
- Opened: 1971; 55 years ago

Tenants
- Football; Southern

Aberdeen Sports Ground (Chinese: 香港仔運動場) is a rugby union and football sports ground situated at 108 Wong Chuk Hang Road, Aberdeen, Hong Kong. It is the home stadium of Hong Kong Premier League football club Southern.

Inside the stadium, there is one running track (6 lanes, 400m) and one natural grass pitch.

Aberdeen Sports Ground is also the venue for 30 Hour Famine in Hong Kong.

After successfully promoted to 2012–13 Hong Kong First Division League, Southern to use Aberdeen Sports Ground as their home ground.

As a result of Typhoon Mangkhut in September 2018, Aberdeen Sports Ground's West stand and canopy were damaged and deemed unusable. In November, a temporary canopy was erected over the East stand in order to allow for the remainder of Southern's home matches to be played at the stadium.

On 21 June 2019, the Leisure and Cultural Services Department announced that renovation work had begun on the stadium and that the facility would be closed to the public until 31 March 2020.
