= Kazakhstan women's national rugby union team =

Kazakhstan
- Nickname: Nomads
- Union: Kazakhstan Rugby Union
- Head coach: Fabian Juries
- Captain: Karina Sazontova
First colours	Second colours

World Rugby ranking
- Current: 19 (as of 15 July 2024)
- Highest: 6
- Lowest: 20 (2022)

First international
- Germany 11–10 Kazakhstan (Hanover, Germany; 31 October 1993)

Biggest win
- Kazakhstan 91–7 Singapore (Almaty, Kazakhstan; 4 September 2013)

Biggest defeat
- Kazakhstan 0–118 Fiji (Dubai, United Arab Emirates; 27 October 2023)

World Cup
- Appearances: 6 (first in 1994)
- Best result: 9th place (1994, 1998)

Women's World Rugby Rankings Top 20 rankings as of 2 November 2026
Rank	Change*	Team	Points
1	Steady	England	94.20
2	Steady	New Zealand	93.18
3	Steady	Canada	91.68
4	Steady	France	85.00
5	Steady	Ireland	78.29
6	Steady	United States	77.50
7	Steady	Australia	77.18
8	Steady	Italy	71.99
9	Steady	Scotland	71.25
10	Steady	South Africa	70.76
11	Steady	Wales	70.12
12	Steady	Fiji	66.65
13	Steady	Japan	65.00
14	Steady	Spain	63.22
15	Steady	Samoa	58.31
16	Steady	Netherlands	58.29
17	Steady	Hong Kong	55.72
18	Steady	Russia	55.10
19	Steady	Kazakhstan	53.95
20	Steady	Germany	51.12
*Change from the previous ranking update

The Kazakhstan women's national rugby union team, nicknamed the Nomads, represents Kazakhstan in women's rugby union and is governed by the Kazakhstan Rugby Union. They have competed in six Rugby World Cups, having made their first appearance in 1994 in Scotland. They compete annually in the Asia Rugby Women's Championship and have won five tournaments.

== History ==
Whilst a part of the Soviet Union, players from the Kazakh Soviet Socialist Republic would play for the Soviet Union women's national rugby union team. Following the dissolution of the Soviet Union, Kazakhstan started playing rugby independently internationally. Kazakhstan played their first test in 1993 and has competed in six Rugby World Cups — 1994, 1998, 2002, 2006, 2010 and 2014.

In 1994, they were invited to replace the Soviet Union at the 1994 Women's Rugby World Cup. In order to get to Scotland where it was being held, the women's team took a three day bus ride to get to Edinburgh.

They won the 2014 Asian Four Nations Championship in Hong Kong. Up to 2019, Kazakhstan had only played four international matches since the 2014 World Cup. They defeated China in the 2019 Asia Rugby Women's Championship Division 1 competition and qualified for the 2020 Asia Rugby Women's Championship.

The 2020 Asia Rugby Women's Championship was postponed twice before it was cancelled altogether. The Nomads were left to play Hong Kong who later withdrew due to challenges caused by COVID-19. They qualified for the repechage tournament and met Colombia who saw them off with a 18–10 victory in a semifinal berth.

In December 2022, Kazakhstan fell five places in rankings, from 15th to 20th, after two consecutive losses to Hong Kong.

== Records ==
=== Overall ===
(Full internationals only)

Rugby: Kazakhstan internationals 1993-
Opponent	First game	Played	Won	Drawn	Lost	Win%
Canada	1994	2	0	0	2	0.00%
China	2007	4	3	0	1	75%
Colombia	2022	1	0	0	1	0.00%
England	2000	3	0	0	3	0.00%
Fiji	2023	1	0	0	1	0.00%
France	1998	3	0	0	3	0.00%
Germany	1993	4	3	0	1	75%
Hong Kong	2009	7	4	0	3	57.14%
Ireland	1998	6	3	0	3	50%
Italy	2001	2	2	0	0	100%
Japan	2005	10	7	0	3	70%
Kenya	2023	1	1	0	0	100%
New Zealand	2014	1	0	0	1	0.00%
Netherlands	1999	2	2	0	0	100%
Russia	1994	4	1	0	3	25%
Samoa	2002	3	0	0	3	0.00%
Spain	2006	2	0	0	2	0.00%
Scotland	2006	1	0	0	1	0.00%
Singapore	2013	2	2	0	0	100%
South Africa	2006	4	1	0	3	25%
Sweden	1994	4	3	0	1	75%
Thailand	2005	1	1	0	0	100%
Uzbekistan	2008	2	2	0	0	100%
United States	2010	2	0	0	2	0.00%
Wales	1994	5	2	0	3	40%
Summary		77	37	0	40	48.05%

=== Rugby World Cup ===
Rugby World Cup
Year	Round	Position	Pld	W	D	L	PF	PA	Squad
(Wales) 1991	Did not enter								
(Scotland) 1994	Plate final	9th	5	3	0	2	91	69	Squad
(Netherlands) 1998	Bowl final	9th	5	4	0	1	109	57	Squad
(Spain) 2002	11th place playoff	11th	4	2	0	2	72	58	Squad
(Canada) 2006	11th place playoff	11th	5	1	0	4	70	114	Squad
(England) 2010	11th place playoff	11th	5	1	0	4	25	203	Squad
(France) 2014	11th place playoff	12th	3	0	0	3	22	215	Squad
(Ireland) 2017	Did not enter								
(New Zealand) 2021	Did Not Qualify								
(England) 2025	Did Not Qualify								
(Australia) 2029	TBD								
(United States) 2033	TBD								
Total	6/9	9th^{†}	27	11	0	16	389	716	
Champion Runner-up Third place Fourth place: * Tied placing ^{†} Best placing / Home venue

=== Results ===
==== 2014 Women's Rugby World Cup ====
1. Kazakhstan 5-79 New Zealand
2. Kazakhstan 7-47 United States
3. Kazakhstan 5-40 Ireland
4. Kazakhstan 5-18 Spain
5. Kazakhstan 0-31 Samoa

==== 2021 Rugby World Cup qualifying ====
1. Kazakhstan 8-13 China
2. Kazakhstan 15-0 China
3. Kazakhstan 10-18 Colombia

==== 2023 WXV ====
1. Kazakhstan 0-109 Ireland
2. Kazakhstan 18-12 Kenya
3. Kazakhstan 0-118 Fiji

=== Asian Championship Results ===
#	Year	M	W	D	L	GF	GA	GD
1	2006	Did Not Compete						
2	2007	2	2	0	0	45	11	+34
3	2008	2	2	0	0	103	6	+97
4	2010	Did Not Compete						
5	2012	2	2	0	0	68	8	+60
6	2013	2	2	0	0	116	30	+86
7	2014	3	3	0	0	130	27	+103
8	2015	2	1	0	1	52	27	+25
9	2016	Did Not Compete						
10	2017	Did Not Compete						
11	2022	2	0	0	2	29	45	-16
12	2023	2	1	0	1	27	95	-68
13	2024	2	0	0	2	0	86	-86
14	2025	2	0	0	2	12	119	-107
Total	10/14	21	13	0	8	582	454	+128

== Players ==
=== Recent Squad ===
Kazakhstan named a 26-player squad for the 2025 Asia Rugby Women's Championship in Fukuoka, Japan.

Player	Position	Date of birth (age)	Club
Irina Balabina	Forward	3 July 2005 (aged 19)	Almaty
Anna Chebotar	Forward	3 July 1989 (aged 35)	Almaty
Maria Grishina	Forward	26 December 1998 (aged 26)	Asiasport
Natalya Kamendrovskaya (c)	Forward	17 April 1990 (aged 35)	Almaty
Xeniya Kim	Forward	21 June 2000 (aged 24)	Asiasport
Viktoriya Kuznetsova	Forward	10 May 2006 (aged 19)	Kostanay
Svetlana Malezhina	Forward	21 June 2000 (aged 24)	Asiasport
Yuliya Oleinikova	Forward	23 June 2003 (aged 21)	PRK Olympics
Anzhelika Pichugina	Forward	27 January 2003 (aged 22)	Asiasport
Karina Sazontova	Forward	12 July 2001 (aged 23)	Asiasport
Darya Simakova	Forward	22 November 2001 (aged 23)	Asiasport
Darya Tkachyova	Forward	8 September 1993 (aged 31)	Asiasport
Yelena Yurova	Forward	18 November 1989 (aged 35)	Asiasport
Symbat Zhamankulova	Forward	16 June 1991 (aged 33)	Almaty
Ayaulym Bakytpek	Back	18 June 2007 (aged 17)	PRK Olympics
Alyona Drobovskaya	Back	6 February 2003 (aged 22)	Asiasport
Liliya Kibisheva	Back	30 January 1988 (aged 37)	PRK Olympics
Tatyana Kruchinkina	Back	22 September 2000 (aged 24)	Asiasport
Angelina Kuznetsova	Back	15 June 2005 (aged 19)	SDUSHOR
Anna Melnikova	Back	8 October 2004 (aged 20)	Asiasport
Yekaterina Savina	Back	26 November 2000 (aged 24)	PRK Olympics
Oxana Shadrina	Back	23 March 1991 (aged 34)	Asiasport
Amina Sharip	Back	13 November 2006 (aged 18)	PRK Olympics
Veronika Stepanyuga	Back	12 November 1994 (aged 30)	Asiasport
Amina Tulegenova	Back	6 August 2004 (aged 20)	PRK Olympics
Natalya Vlassova	Back	1 January 1996 (aged 29)	Asiasport

== See also ==
- Rugby union in Kazakhstan
